= 2025 Okolo Slovenska =

2025 UCI Europe Tour

Race details
- Dates: 17–21 September 2025
- Stages: 5
- Distance: 795.4 km (494.2 mi)
- Winning time: 18h 12' 22"

Results
Jersey awarded to the overall winner	Winner	Paul Double (GBR)	(Team Jayco–AlUla)
	Second	Bart Lemmen (NED)	(Visma–Lease a Bike)
	Third	Thomas Gloag (GBR)	(Visma–Lease a Bike)
Jersey awarded to the points classification winner	Points	Paul Magnier (FRA)	(Soudal–Quick-Step)
Jersey awarded to the mountains classification winner	Mountains	Martin Voltr (CZE)	(ATT Investments)
Jersey awarded to the young rider classification winner	Young rider	Cian Uijtdebroeks (BEL)	(Visma–Lease a Bike)
	Team	(Netherlands) Visma–Lease a Bike	

The 2025 Okolo Slovenska (transl. Tour of Slovakia) was the 69th edition of the Okolo Slovenska road cycling stage race. It was held between 17 and 21 September 2025, as a category 2.1 event on the 2025 UCI Europe Tour.

== Teams ==
Three UCI WorldTeams, four UCI ProTeams, and thirteen UCI Continental teams made up the twenty participating teams in the race.

UCI WorldTeams

- Soudal–Quick-Step
- Team Jayco–AlUla
- Visma–Lease a Bike

UCI ProTeams

- Lotto
- Team Novo Nordisk
- Team Solution Tech–Vini Fantini
- Unibet Tietema Rockets

UCI Continental Teams

- Adria Mobil
- ATT Investments
- Biesse–Carrera–Premac
- Diftar Continental Cyclingteam
- Dukla Banská Bystrica
- Elkov–Kasper
- Équipe Continentale Groupama–FDJ
- Illes Balears Arabay
- Karcag Cycling ÉPKAR Team
- Mazowsze Serce Polski
- Pierre Baguette Cycling
- VolkerWessels Cycling Team
- XDS Astana Development Team

== Route ==
Stage characteristics and winners
Stage	Date	Route	Distance	Type	Winner
1	17 September	Bardejov to Bardejov	141.2 km (87.7 mi)	Hilly stage	Paul Magnier (FRA)
2	18 September	Svidník to Košice	169.4 km (105.3 mi)	Hilly stage	Paul Magnier (FRA)
3	19 September	Kežmarok to Banská Bystrica	191.7 km (119.1 mi)	Hilly stage	Paul Magnier (FRA)
4	20 September	Vráble to Sládkovičovo	169.1 km (105.1 mi)	Flat stage	Paul Magnier (FRA)
5	21 September	Nová Dubnica to Kohútka	124 km (77 mi)	Mountain stage	Paul Double (GBR)
Total			795.4 km (494.2 mi)		

== Stages ==
=== Stage 1 ===
17 September 2025 — Bardejov to Bardejov, 141.2 km (87.7 mi)

Stage 1 Result
Rank	Rider	Team	Time
1	Paul Magnier (FRA)	Soudal–Quick-Step	3h 14' 10"
2	Lukáš Kubiš (SVK)	Unibet Tietema Rockets	+ 0"
3	Joppe Heremans (BEL)	VolkerWessels Cycling Team	+ 0"
4	Liam Van Bylen (BEL)	Lotto	+ 0"
5	Alessio Delle Vedove (ITA)	XDS Astana Development Team	+ 0"
6	Niklas Behrens (GER)	Lidl–Trek	+ 0"
7	Blake Agnoletto (AUS)	Équipe Continentale Groupama–FDJ	+ 0"
8	Nicolò Arrighetti (ITA)	Biesse–Carrera–Premac	+ 0"
9	Milan Menten (BEL)	Lotto	+ 0"
10	Timo de Jong (NED)	VolkerWessels Cycling Team	+ 0"

General classification after Stage 1
Rank	Rider	Team	Time
1	Paul Magnier (FRA)	Soudal–Quick-Step	3h 14' 00"
2	Lukáš Kubiš (SVK)	Unibet Tietema Rockets	+ 4"
3	Joppe Heremans (BEL)	VolkerWessels Cycling Team	+ 6"
4	Oscar Nilsson-Julien (FRA)	Équipe Continentale Groupama–FDJ	+ 7"
5	Stijn Daemen (NED)	VolkerWessels Cycling Team	+ 8"
6	Liam Van Bylen (BEL)	Lotto	+ 10"
7	Alessio Delle Vedove (ITA)	XDS Astana Development Team	+ 10"
8	Niklas Behrens (GER)	Lidl–Trek	+ 10"
9	Blake Agnoletto (AUS)	Équipe Continentale Groupama–FDJ	+ 10"
10	Nicolò Arrighetti (ITA)	Biesse–Carrera–Premac	+ 10"

=== Stage 2 ===
18 September 2025 — Svidník to Košice, 169.4 km (105.3 mi)

Stage 2 Result
Rank	Rider	Team	Time
1	Paul Magnier (FRA)	Soudal–Quick-Step	3h 57' 22"
2	Lukáš Kubiš (SVK)	Unibet Tietema Rockets	+ 0"
3	Milan Menten (BEL)	Lotto	+ 0"
4	Matthew Walls (GBR)	Équipe Continentale Groupama–FDJ	+ 0"
5	Nicolò Arrighetti (ITA)	Biesse–Carrera–Premac	+ 0"
6	Dries Van Gestel (BEL)	Soudal–Quick-Step	+ 0"
7	Niklas Behrens (GER)	Visma–Lease a Bike	+ 0"
8	Dominik Neuman (CZE)	ATT Investments	+ 0"
9	Yves Lampaert (BEL)	Soudal–Quick-Step	+ 0"
10	Andrea Peron (ITA)	Team Novo Nordisk	+ 0"

General classification after Stage 2
Rank	Rider	Team	Time
1	Paul Magnier (FRA)	Soudal–Quick-Step	7h 11' 12"
2	Lukáš Kubiš (SVK)	Unibet Tietema Rockets	+ 8"
3	Milan Menten (BEL)	Lotto	+ 16"
4	Matúš Štoček (SVK)	Elkov–Kasper	+ 17"
5	Oscar Nilsson-Julien (FRA)	Équipe Continentale Groupama–FDJ	+ 17"
6	Stijn Daemen (NED)	VolkerWessels Cycling Team	+ 18"
7	Jasper Haest (NED)	VolkerWessels Cycling Team	+ 18"
8	Nicolò Arrighetti (ITA)	Biesse–Carrera–Premac	+ 20"
9	Niklas Behrens (GER)	Lidl–Trek	+ 20"
10	Matthew Walls (GBR)	Équipe Continentale Groupama–FDJ	+ 20"

=== Stage 3 ===
19 September 2025 — Kežmarok to Banská Bystrica, 191.7 km (119.1 mi)

Stage 3 Result
Rank	Rider	Team	Time
1	Paul Magnier (FRA)	Soudal–Quick-Step	4h 32' 13"
2	Lukáš Kubiš (SVK)	Unibet Tietema Rockets	+ 0"
3	Matthew Walls (GBR)	Équipe Continentale Groupama–FDJ	+ 0"
4	Milan Menten (BEL)	Lotto	+ 0"
5	Tilen Finkšt (SLO)	Adria Mobil	+ 0"
6	Eliott Boulet (FRA)	Équipe Continentale Groupama–FDJ	+ 0"
7	Marcin Budziński (POL)	Mazowsze Serce Polski	+ 0"
8	Alessio Delle Vedove (ITA)	XDS Astana Development Team	+ 0"
9	Adam Bittman (CZE)	Elkov–Kasper	+ 0"
10	Dominik Neuman (CZE)	ATT Investments	+ 0"

General classification after Stage 3
Rank	Rider	Team	Time
1	Paul Magnier (FRA)	Soudal–Quick-Step	11h 43' 12"
2	Lukáš Kubiš (SVK)	Unibet Tietema Rockets	+ 15"
3	Thomas Gloag (GBR)	Visma–Lease a Bike	+ 28"
4	Paweł Bernas (POL)	Mazowsze Serce Polski	+ 28"
5	Milan Menten (BEL)	Lotto	+ 29"
6	Matthew Walls (GBR)	Équipe Continentale Groupama–FDJ	+ 29"
7	Matúš Štoček (SVK)	Elkov–Kasper	+ 30"
8	Oscar Nilsson-Julien (FRA)	Équipe Continentale Groupama–FDJ	+ 30"
9	Andrea Raccagni Noviero (ITA)	Soudal–Quick-Step	+ 31"
10	Jasper Haest (NED)	VolkerWessels Cycling Team	+ 31"

=== Stage 4 ===
20 September 2025 — Vráble to Sládkovičovo, 169.1 km (105.1 mi)

Stage 4 Result
Rank	Rider	Team	Time
1	Paul Magnier (FRA)	Soudal–Quick-Step	3h 30' 16"
2	Lukáš Kubiš (SVK)	Unibet Tietema Rockets	+ 0"
3	Milan Menten (BEL)	Lotto	+ 0"
4	Niklas Behrens (GER)	Visma–Lease a Bike	+ 0"
5	Andrea Peron (ITA)	Team Novo Nordisk	+ 0"
6	Nicolò Arrighetti (ITA)	Biesse–Carrera–Premac	+ 0"
7	Dominik Neuman (CZE)	ATT Investments	+ 0"
8	Timo de Jong (NED)	VolkerWessels Cycling Team	+ 0"
9	Adam Bittman (CZE)	Elkov–Kasper	+ 0"
10	Filippo Ridolfo (ITA)	Team Novo Nordisk	+ 0"

General classification after Stage 4
Rank	Rider	Team	Time
1	Paul Magnier (FRA)	Soudal–Quick-Step	15h 13' 18"
2	Lukáš Kubiš (SVK)	Unibet Tietema Rockets	+ 19"
3	Milan Menten (BEL)	Lotto	+ 35"
4	Oscar Nilsson-Julien (FRA)	Équipe Continentale Groupama–FDJ	+ 35"
5	Thomas Gloag (GBR)	Visma–Lease a Bike	+ 38"
6	Paweł Bernas (POL)	Mazowsze Serce Polski	+ 38"
7	Matthew Walls (GBR)	Équipe Continentale Groupama–FDJ	+ 39"
8	Matúš Štoček (SVK)	Elkov–Kasper	+ 40"
9	Andrea Raccagni Noviero (ITA)	Soudal–Quick-Step	+ 41"
10	Jasper Haest (NED)	VolkerWessels Cycling Team	+ 41"

=== Stage 5 ===
21 September 2025 — Nová Dubnica to Kohútka, 124 km (77 mi)

Stage 5 Result
Rank	Rider	Team	Time
1	Paul Double (GBR)	Team Jayco–AlUla	2h 58' 31"
2	Bart Lemmen (NED)	Visma–Lease a Bike	+ 30"
3	Thomas Gloag (GBR)	Visma–Lease a Bike	+ 34"
4	Felix Engelhardt (GER)	Team Jayco–AlUla	+ 41"
5	Cian Uijtdebroeks (BEL)	Visma–Lease a Bike	+ 50"
6	Andrea Raccagni Noviero (ITA)	Soudal–Quick-Step	+ 56"
7	Matteo Fabbro (ITA)	Team Solution Tech–Vini Fantini	+ 1' 03"
8	Tijmen Graat (NED)	Visma–Lease a Bike	+ 1' 03"
9	Piotr Pękala (POL)	ATT Investments	+ 1' 06"
10	Lukáš Kubiš (SVK)	Unibet Tietema Rockets	+ 1' 18"

General classification after Stage 5
Rank	Rider	Team	Time
1	Paul Double (GBR)	Team Jayco–AlUla	18h 12' 22"
2	Bart Lemmen (NED)	Visma–Lease a Bike	+ 33"
3	Thomas Gloag (GBR)	Visma–Lease a Bike	+ 35"
4	Felix Engelhardt (GER)	Team Jayco–AlUla	+ 51"
5	Cian Uijtdebroeks (BEL)	Visma–Lease a Bike	+ 1' 00"
6	Lukáš Kubiš (SVK)	Unibet Tietema Rockets	+ 1' 01"
7	Andrea Raccagni Noviero (ITA)	Soudal–Quick-Step	+ 1' 02"
8	Matteo Fabbro (ITA)	Team Solution Tech–Vini Fantini	+ 1' 13"
9	Tijmen Graat (NED)	Visma–Lease a Bike	+ 1' 13"
10	Piotr Pękala (POL)	ATT Investments	+ 1' 16"

== Classification leadership table ==
Classification leadership by stage
Stage	Winner	General classification	Points classification	Mountains classification	Young rider classification	Team classification
1	Paul Magnier	Paul Magnier	Paul Magnier	Stijn Daemen	Paul Magnier	VolkerWessels Cycling Team
2	Paul Magnier	Paul Magnier	Paul Magnier	Lucas Van Gils	Paul Magnier	Soudal–Quick-Step
3	Paul Magnier	Paul Magnier	Paul Magnier	Martin Voltr	Paul Magnier	Soudal–Quick-Step
4	Paul Magnier	Paul Magnier	Paul Magnier	Martin Voltr	Paul Magnier	Biesse–Carrera–Premac
5	Paul Double	Paul Double	Paul Magnier	Martin Voltr	Cian Uijtdebroeks	Visma–Lease a Bike
Final		Paul Double	Paul Magnier	Martin Voltr	Cian Uijtdebroeks	Visma–Lease a Bike

== Classification standings ==
Legend
Denotes the winner of the general classification	Denotes the winner of the mountains classification
Denotes the winner of the points classification	Denotes the winner of the young rider classification

=== General classification ===
Final general classification (1–10)
Rank	Rider	Team	Time
1	Paul Double (GBR)	Team Jayco–AlUla	18h 12' 22"
2	Bart Lemmen (NED)	Visma–Lease a Bike	+ 33"
3	Thomas Gloag (GBR)	Visma–Lease a Bike	+ 35"
4	Felix Engelhardt (GER)	Team Jayco–AlUla	+ 51"
5	Cian Uijtdebroeks (BEL)	Visma–Lease a Bike	+ 1' 00"
6	Lukáš Kubiš (SVK)	Unibet Tietema Rockets	+ 1' 01"
7	Andrea Raccagni Noviero (ITA)	Soudal–Quick-Step	+ 1' 02"
8	Matteo Fabbro (ITA)	Team Solution Tech–Vini Fantini	+ 1' 13"
9	Tijmen Graat (NED)	Visma–Lease a Bike	+ 1' 13"
10	Piotr Pękala (POL)	ATT Investments	+ 1' 16"

=== Points classification ===
Final points classification (1–10)
Rank	Rider	Team	Points
1	Paul Magnier (FRA)	Soudal–Quick-Step	86
2	Lukáš Kubiš (SVK)	Unibet Tietema Rockets	67
3	Milan Menten (BEL)	Lotto	36
4	Matthew Walls (GBR)	Équipe Continentale Groupama–FDJ	22
5	Niklas Behrens (GER)	Visma–Lease a Bike	21
6	Thomas Gloag (GBR)	Visma–Lease a Bike	18
7	Nicolò Arrighetti (ITA)	Biesse–Carrera–Premac	17
8	Oscar Nilsson-Julien (FRA)	Équipe Continentale Groupama–FDJ	16
9	Andrea Raccagni Noviero (ITA)	Soudal–Quick-Step	13
10	Joppe Heremans (BEL)	VolkerWessels Cycling Team	12

=== Mountains classification ===
Final mountains classification (1–10)
Rank	Rider	Team	Points
1	Martin Voltr (CZE)	ATT Investments	30
2	Paul Double (GBR)	Team Jayco–AlUla	24
3	Thomas Gloag (GBR)	Visma–Lease a Bike	19
4	Rémi Daumas (FRA)	Équipe Continentale Groupama–FDJ	13
5	Lucas Van Gils (BEL)	Lotto	11
6	Timo de Jong (NED)	VolkerWessels Cycling Team	11
7	Bart Lemmen (NED)	Visma–Lease a Bike	11
8	Stijn Daemen (NED)	VolkerWessels Cycling Team	10
9	Oscar Nilsson-Julien (FRA)	Équipe Continentale Groupama–FDJ	7
10	Cian Uijtdebroeks (BEL)	Visma–Lease a Bike	7

=== Young rider classification ===
Final young rider classification (1–10)
Rank	Rider	Team	Time
1	Cian Uijtdebroeks (BEL)	Visma–Lease a Bike	18h 13' 22"
2	Andrea Raccagni Noviero (ITA)	Soudal–Quick-Step	+ 2"
3	Tijmen Graat (NED)	Visma–Lease a Bike	+ 13"
4	Niels Driesen (BEL)	Lotto	+ 1' 28"
5	Adam Rafferty (IRL)	Team Jayco–AlUla	+ 1' 53"
6	Menno Huising (NED)	Visma–Lease a Bike	+ 2' 29"
7	Rémi Daumas (FRA)	Équipe Continentale Groupama–FDJ	+ 2' 55"
8	Baptiste Grégoire (FRA)	Équipe Continentale Groupama–FDJ	+ 6' 50"
9	Michele Bicelli (ITA)	Biesse–Carrera–Premac	+ 6' 52"
10	Mike Bronswijk (NED)	Diftar Continental Cyclingteam	+ 8' 50"

=== Team classification ===
Final team classification (1–10)
Rank	Team	Time
1	(Netherlands) Visma–Lease a Bike	54h 39' 30"
2	(Australia) Team Jayco–AlUla	+ 1' 30"
3	(France) Unibet Tietema Rockets	+ 10' 22"
4	(Belgium) Lotto	+ 11' 33"
5	(Belgium) Soudal–Quick-Step	+ 13' 21"
6	(France) Équipe Continentale Groupama–FDJ	+ 14' 54"
7	(Italy) Team Solution Tech–Vini Fantini	+ 15' 33"
8	(Czech Republic) ATT Investments	+ 17' 29"
9	(Kazakhstan) XDS Astana Development Team	+ 24' 10"
10	(Netherlands) VolkerWessels Cycling Team	+ 24' 51"
