= 2023 Tour de Suisse =

Swiss cycling race

2023 UCI World Tour, race 24 of 35

Race details
- Dates: 11–18 June 2023
- Stages: 8
- Distance: 1,118.2 km (694.8 mi)
- Winning time: 21h 17' 19"

Results
Jersey awarded to the overall winner	Winner	Mattias Skjelmose (DEN)	(Trek–Segafredo)
	Second	Juan Ayuso (ESP)	(UAE Team Emirates)
	Third	Remco Evenepoel (BEL)	(Soudal–Quick-Step)
Jersey awarded to the mountains classification winner	Mountains	Pascal Eenkhoorn (NED)	(Lotto–Dstny)
Jersey awarded to the young rider classification winner	Young rider	Mattias Skjelmose (DEN)	(Trek–Segafredo)
Jersey awarded to the sprints classification winner	Sprints	Wout van Aert (BEL)	(Team Jumbo–Visma)
	Team	(France) AG2R Citroën Team	

The 2023 Tour de Suisse was a road cycling stage race that took place between 11 and 18 June 2023 in Switzerland. It was the 86th edition of the Tour de Suisse and the 24th event of the 2023 UCI World Tour.

On 16 June 2023, Swiss rider Gino Mäder died in hospital in Chur after a heavy crash on the descent of the Albula Pass during stage 5. Stage 6 was neutralised and a short homage to Mäder was completed instead.

== Teams ==
All eighteen UCI WorldTeams were joined by five UCI ProTeams to make up the twenty-three teams that participated in the race.

UCI WorldTeams

- AG2R Citroën Team
- Alpecin–Deceuninck
- Astana Qazaqstan Team
- Bora–Hansgrohe
- Cofidis
- EF Education–EasyPost
- Groupama–FDJ
- INEOS Grenadiers
- Intermarché–Circus–Wanty
- Movistar Team
- Soudal–Quick-Step
- Team Bahrain Victorious
- Team DSM
- Team Jayco–AlUla
- Team Jumbo–Visma
- Trek–Segafredo
- UAE Team Emirates

UCI ProTeams

- Israel–Premier Tech
- Lotto–Dstny
- Q36.5 Pro Cycling Team
- Team TotalEnergies
- Tudor Pro Cycling Team

== Route ==
Stage characteristics and winners
Stage	Date	Route	Distance	Type	Winner
1	11 June	Einsiedeln to Einsiedeln	12.7 km (7.9 mi)	Individual time trial	Stefan Küng (SUI)
2	12 June	Beromünster to Nottwil	173.7 km (107.9 mi)	Hilly stage	Biniam Girmay (ERI)
3	13 June	Tafers to Villars-sur-Ollon	143.8 km (89.4 mi)	Mountain stage	Mattias Skjelmose (DEN)
4	14 June	Monthey to Leukerbad	152.5 km (94.8 mi)	Mountain stage	Felix Gall (AUT)
5	15 June	Fiesch to La Punt	211 km (131 mi)	Mountain stage	Juan Ayuso (ESP)
6	16 June	La Punt to Oberwil-Lieli	215.3 km (133.8 mi)	Hilly stage	Stage neutralised
7	17 June	Tübach to Weinfelden	183.5 km (114.0 mi)	Hilly stage	Remco Evenepoel (BEL)
8	18 June	St. Gallen to Abtwil	25.7 km (16.0 mi)	Individual time trial	Juan Ayuso (ESP)
Total			1,118.2 km (694.8 mi)		

== Stages ==
=== Stage 1 ===
11 June 2023 — Einsiedeln to Einsiedeln, 12.7 km (7.9 mi) (ITT)

Stage 1 Result
Rank	Rider	Team	Time
1	Stefan Küng (SUI)	Groupama–FDJ	13' 31"
2	Remco Evenepoel (BEL)	Soudal–Quick-Step	+ 6"
3	Wout van Aert (BEL)	Team Jumbo–Visma	+ 10"
4	Magnus Sheffield (USA)	INEOS Grenadiers	+ 11"
5	Johan Price-Pejtersen (DEN)	Team Bahrain Victorious	+ 17"
6	Mattias Skjelmose (DEN)	Trek–Segafredo	+ 19"
7	Stefan Bissegger (SUI)	EF Education–EasyPost	+ 20"
8	Matteo Sobrero (ITA)	Team Jayco–AlUla	+ 20"
9	Kasper Asgreen (DEN)	Soudal–Quick-Step	+ 23"
10	Juan Ayuso (ESP)	UAE Team Emirates	+ 25"

General classification after Stage 1
Rank	Rider	Team	Time
1	Stefan Küng (SUI)	Groupama–FDJ	13' 31"
2	Remco Evenepoel (BEL)	Soudal–Quick-Step	+ 6"
3	Wout van Aert (BEL)	Team Jumbo–Visma	+ 10"
4	Magnus Sheffield (USA)	INEOS Grenadiers	+ 11"
5	Johan Price-Pejtersen (DEN)	Team Bahrain Victorious	+ 17"
6	Mattias Skjelmose (DEN)	Trek–Segafredo	+ 19"
7	Stefan Bissegger (SUI)	EF Education–EasyPost	+ 20"
8	Matteo Sobrero (ITA)	Team Jayco–AlUla	+ 20"
9	Kasper Asgreen (DEN)	Soudal–Quick-Step	+ 23"
10	Juan Ayuso (ESP)	UAE Team Emirates	+ 25"

=== Stage 2 ===
12 June 2023 — Beromünster to Nottwil, 173.7 km (107.9 mi)

Stage 2 Result
Rank	Rider	Team	Time
1	Biniam Girmay (ERI)	Intermarché–Circus–Wanty	3h 53' 37"
2	Arnaud Démare (FRA)	Groupama–FDJ	+ 0"
3	Wout van Aert (BEL)	Team Jumbo–Visma	+ 0"
4	Pavel Bittner (CZE)	Team DSM	+ 0"
5	Peter Sagan (SVK)	Team TotalEnergies	+ 0"
6	Jordi Meeus (BEL)	Bora–Hansgrohe	+ 0"
7	Iván García Cortina (ESP)	Movistar Team	+ 0"
8	Alex Aranburu (ESP)	Movistar Team	+ 0"
9	Mike Teunissen (NED)	Intermarché–Circus–Wanty	+ 0"
10	Cédric Beullens (BEL)	Lotto–Dstny	+ 0"

General classification after Stage 2
Rank	Rider	Team	Time
1	Stefan Küng (SUI)	Groupama–FDJ	4h 07' 08"
2	Remco Evenepoel (BEL)	Soudal–Quick-Step	+ 5"
3	Wout van Aert (BEL)	Team Jumbo–Visma	+ 6"
4	Magnus Sheffield (USA)	INEOS Grenadiers	+ 11"
5	Johan Price-Pejtersen (DEN)	Team Bahrain Victorious	+ 17"
6	Mattias Skjelmose (DEN)	Trek–Segafredo	+ 19"
7	Stefan Bissegger (SUI)	EF Education–EasyPost	+ 20"
8	Matteo Sobrero (ITA)	Team Jayco–AlUla	+ 20"
9	Kasper Asgreen (DEN)	Soudal–Quick-Step	+ 23"
10	Juan Ayuso (ESP)	UAE Team Emirates	+ 25"

=== Stage 3 ===
13 June 2023 — Tafers to Villars-sur-Ollon, 143.8 km (89.4 mi)

Stage 3 Result
Rank	Rider	Team	Time
1	Mattias Skjelmose (DEN)	Trek–Segafredo	3h 29' 14"
2	Felix Gall (AUT)	AG2R Citroën Team	+ 3"
3	Juan Ayuso (ESP)	UAE Team Emirates	+ 12"
4	Remco Evenepoel (BEL)	Soudal–Quick-Step	+ 21"
5	Cian Uijtdebroeks (BEL)	Bora–Hansgrohe	+ 21"
6	Pello Bilbao (ESP)	Team Bahrain Victorious	+ 21"
7	Wilco Kelderman (NED)	Team Jumbo–Visma	+ 21"
8	Rigoberto Urán (COL)	EF Education–EasyPost	+ 21"
9	Magnus Sheffield (USA)	INEOS Grenadiers	+ 37"
10	Romain Bardet (FRA)	Team DSM	+ 45"

General classification after Stage 3
Rank	Rider	Team	Time
1	Mattias Skjelmose (DEN)	Trek–Segafredo	7h 36' 31"
2	Remco Evenepoel (BEL)	Soudal–Quick-Step	+ 17"
3	Juan Ayuso (ESP)	UAE Team Emirates	+ 24"
4	Magnus Sheffield (USA)	INEOS Grenadiers	+ 39"
5	Pello Bilbao (ESP)	Team Bahrain Victorious	+ 49"
6	Rigoberto Urán (COL)	EF Education–EasyPost	+ 56"
7	Wilco Kelderman (NED)	Team Jumbo–Visma	+ 1' 04"
8	Ion Izagirre (ESP)	EF Education–EasyPost	+ 1' 05"
9	Felix Gall (AUT)	AG2R Citroën Team	+ 1' 07"
10	Romain Bardet (FRA)	Team DSM	+ 1' 15"

=== Stage 4 ===
14 June 2023 — Monthey to Leukerbad, 152.5 km (94.8 mi)

Stage 4 Result
Rank	Rider	Team	Time
1	Felix Gall (AUT)	AG2R Citroën Team	3h 42' 22"
2	Remco Evenepoel (BEL)	Soudal–Quick-Step	+ 1' 02"
3	Mattias Skjelmose (DEN)	Trek–Segafredo	+ 1' 03"
4	Cian Uijtdebroeks (BEL)	Bora–Hansgrohe	+ 1' 05"
5	Wilco Kelderman (NED)	Team Jumbo–Visma	+ 1' 05"
6	Pello Bilbao (ESP)	Team Bahrain Victorious	+ 1' 05"
7	Romain Bardet (FRA)	Team DSM	+ 1' 07"
8	Sylvain Moniquet (BEL)	Lotto–Dstny	+ 1' 10"
9	Harold Tejada (COL)	Astana Qazaqstan Team	+ 1' 36"
10	Maximilian Schachmann (GER)	Bora–Hansgrohe	+ 1' 49"

General classification after Stage 4
Rank	Rider	Team	Time
1	Felix Gall (AUT)	AG2R Citroën Team	11h 19' 50"
2	Mattias Skjelmose (DEN)	Trek–Segafredo	+ 2"
3	Remco Evenepoel (BEL)	Soudal–Quick-Step	+ 16"
4	Pello Bilbao (ESP)	Team Bahrain Victorious	+ 57"
5	Wilco Kelderman (NED)	Team Jumbo–Visma	+ 1' 12"
6	Juan Ayuso (ESP)	UAE Team Emirates	+ 1' 18"
7	Romain Bardet (FRA)	Team DSM	+ 1' 25"
8	Cian Uijtdebroeks (BEL)	Bora–Hansgrohe	+ 1' 26"
9	Magnus Sheffield (USA)	INEOS Grenadiers	+ 1' 33"
10	Rigoberto Urán (COL)	EF Education–EasyPost	+ 1' 50"

=== Stage 5 ===
15 June 2023 — Fiesch to La Punt, 211 km (131 mi)

Stage 5 Result
Rank	Rider	Team	Time
1	Juan Ayuso (ESP)	UAE Team Emirates	5h 23' 01"
2	Mattias Skjelmose (DEN)	Trek–Segafredo	+ 54"
3	Pello Bilbao (ESP)	Team Bahrain Victorious	+ 54"
4	Rigoberto Urán (COL)	EF Education–EasyPost	+ 54"
5	Romain Bardet (FRA)	Team DSM	+ 54"
6	Wilco Kelderman (NED)	Team Jumbo–Visma	+ 54"
7	Rui Costa (POR)	Intermarché–Circus–Wanty	+ 58"
8	Felix Gall (AUT)	AG2R Citroën Team	+ 58"
9	Antonio Tiberi (ITA)	Team Bahrain Victorious	+ 1' 01"
10	Remco Evenepoel (BEL)	Soudal–Quick-Step	+ 1' 20"

General classification after Stage 5
Rank	Rider	Team	Time
1	Mattias Skjelmose (DEN)	Trek–Segafredo	16h 43' 41"
2	Felix Gall (AUT)	AG2R Citroën Team	+ 8"
3	Juan Ayuso (ESP)	UAE Team Emirates	+ 18"
4	Remco Evenepoel (BEL)	Soudal–Quick-Step	+ 46"
5	Pello Bilbao (ESP)	Team Bahrain Victorious	+ 57"
6	Wilco Kelderman (NED)	Team Jumbo–Visma	+ 1' 16"
7	Romain Bardet (FRA)	Team DSM	+ 1' 29"
8	Rigoberto Urán (COL)	EF Education–EasyPost	+ 1' 54"
9	Cian Uijtdebroeks (BEL)	Bora–Hansgrohe	+ 1' 57"
10	Dylan Teuns (BEL)	Israel–Premier Tech	+ 3' 00"

=== Stage 6 ===
16 June 2023 — La Punt to Oberwil-Lieli, 215.3 km (133.8 mi)

Stage 6 was cancelled after the announcement of Gino Mäder's death. The riders rode the last 20 kilometers of the stage, but without it counting towards any of the classifications.

=== Stage 7 ===
17 June 2023 — Tübach to Weinfelden, 183.5 km (114.0 mi)

Prior to the stage, Team Bahrain Victorious, Tudor Pro Cycling Team and Intermarché–Circus–Wanty withdrew from the race, due to Mäder's death.

Stage 7 Result
Rank	Rider	Team	Time
1	Remco Evenepoel (BEL)	Soudal–Quick-Step	4h 01' 04"
2	Wout van Aert (BEL)	Team Jumbo–Visma	+ 0"
3	Bryan Coquard (FRA)	Cofidis	+ 0"
4	Lorrenzo Manzin (FRA)	Team TotalEnergies	+ 0"
5	Alex Aranburu (ESP)	Movistar Team	+ 0"
6	Kevin Vermaerke (USA)	Team DSM	+ 0"
7	Romain Grégoire (FRA)	Groupama–FDJ	+ 0"
8	Jonas Koch (GER)	Bora–Hansgrohe	+ 0"
9	Gonzalo Serrano (ESP)	Movistar Team	+ 0"
10	Matthew Dinham (AUS)	Team DSM	+ 0"

General classification after Stage 7
Rank	Rider	Team	Time
1	Mattias Skjelmose (DEN)	Trek–Segafredo	20h 44' 45"
2	Felix Gall (AUT)	AG2R Citroën Team	+ 8"
3	Juan Ayuso (ESP)	UAE Team Emirates	+ 18"
4	Remco Evenepoel (BEL)	Soudal–Quick-Step	+ 46"
5	Wilco Kelderman (NED)	Team Jumbo–Visma	+ 1' 16"
6	Romain Bardet (FRA)	Team DSM	+ 1' 29"
7	Rigoberto Urán (COL)	EF Education–EasyPost	+ 1' 54"
8	Cian Uijtdebroeks (BEL)	Bora–Hansgrohe	+ 1' 57"
9	Dylan Teuns (BEL)	Israel–Premier Tech	+ 3' 00"
10	Harold Tejada (COL)	Astana Qazaqstan Team	+ 3' 48"

=== Stage 8 ===
18 June 2023 — St. Gallen to Abtwil, 25.7 km (16.0 mi) (ITT)

Stage 8 Result
Rank	Rider	Team	Time
1	Juan Ayuso (ESP)	UAE Team Emirates	32' 25"
2	Remco Evenepoel (BEL)	Soudal–Quick-Step	+ 8"
3	Mattias Skjelmose (DEN)	Trek–Segafredo	+ 9"
4	Stefan Bissegger (SUI)	EF Education–EasyPost	+ 23"
5	Wout van Aert (BEL)	Team Jumbo–Visma	+ 28"
6	Kasper Asgreen (DEN)	Soudal–Quick-Step	+ 36"
7	Mattia Cattaneo (ITA)	Soudal–Quick-Step	+ 39"
8	Matteo Sobrero (ITA)	Bora–Hansgrohe	+ 40"
9	Finn Fisher-Black (NZL)	UAE Team Emirates	+ 42"
10	Neilson Powless (USA)	EF Education–EasyPost	+ 46"

General classification after Stage 8
Rank	Rider	Team	Time
1	Mattias Skjelmose (DEN)	Trek–Segafredo	21h 17' 19"
2	Juan Ayuso (ESP)	UAE Team Emirates	+ 9"
3	Remco Evenepoel (BEL)	Soudal–Quick-Step	+ 45"
4	Wilco Kelderman (NED)	Team Jumbo–Visma	+ 2' 09"
5	Romain Bardet (FRA)	Team DSM	+ 2' 41"
6	Rigoberto Urán (COL)	EF Education–EasyPost	+ 2' 47"
7	Cian Uijtdebroeks (BEL)	Bora–Hansgrohe	+ 3' 04"
8	Felix Gall (AUT)	AG2R Citroën Team	+ 3' 25"
9	Dylan Teuns (BEL)	Israel–Premier Tech	+ 4' 29"
10	Harold Tejada (COL)	Astana Qazaqstan Team	+ 4' 57"

== Classification leadership table ==
Classification leadership by stage
Stage	Winner	General classification	Sprints classification	Mountains classification	Young rider classification	Team classification	Most active rider award
1	Stefan Küng	Stefan Küng	Stefan Küng	not awarded	Remco Evenepoel	Soudal–Quick-Step	
2	Biniam Girmay	Stefan Küng	Wout van Aert	Nickolas Zukowsky	Remco Evenepoel	Soudal–Quick-Step	Michael Schär
3	Mattias Skjelmose	Mattias Skjelmose	Wout van Aert	Nickolas Zukowsky	Mattias Skjelmose	INEOS Grenadiers	
4	Felix Gall	Felix Gall	Wout van Aert	Lilian Calmejane	Felix Gall	INEOS Grenadiers	
5	Juan Ayuso	Mattias Skjelmose	Wout van Aert	Pascal Eenkhoorn	Mattias Skjelmose	AG2R Citroën Team	
6	Cancelled	Mattias Skjelmose	Wout van Aert	Pascal Eenkhoorn	Mattias Skjelmose	AG2R Citroën Team	
7	Remco Evenepoel	Mattias Skjelmose	Wout van Aert	Pascal Eenkhoorn	Mattias Skjelmose	AG2R Citroën Team	
8	Juan Ayuso	Mattias Skjelmose	Wout van Aert	Pascal Eenkhoorn	Mattias Skjelmose	AG2R Citroën Team	
Final		Mattias Skjelmose	Wout van Aert	Pascal Eenkhoorn	Mattias Skjelmose	AG2R Citroën Team	

== Classification standings ==
Legend
Denotes the winner of the general classification	Denotes the winner of the young rider classification
Denotes the winner of the points classification	Denotes the winner of the team classification
Denotes the winner of the mountains classification	

=== General classification ===
Final general classification (1–10)
Rank	Rider	Team	Time
1	Mattias Skjelmose (DEN)	Trek–Segafredo	21h 17' 19"
2	Juan Ayuso (ESP)	UAE Team Emirates	+ 9"
3	Remco Evenepoel (BEL)	Soudal–Quick-Step	+ 45"
4	Wilco Kelderman (NED)	Team Jumbo–Visma	+ 2' 09"
5	Romain Bardet (FRA)	Team DSM	+ 2' 41"
6	Rigoberto Urán (COL)	EF Education–EasyPost	+ 2' 47"
7	Cian Uijtdebroeks (BEL)	Bora–Hansgrohe	+ 3' 04"
8	Felix Gall (AUT)	AG2R Citroën Team	+ 3' 25"
9	Dylan Teuns (BEL)	Israel–Premier Tech	+ 4' 29"
10	Harold Tejada (COL)	Astana Qazaqstan Team	+ 4' 57"

=== Points classification ===
Final points classification (1–10)
Rank	Rider	Team	Points
1	Wout van Aert (BEL)	Team Jumbo–Visma	52
2	Remco Evenepoel (BEL)	Soudal–Quick-Step	40
3	Mattias Skjelmose (DEN)	Trek–Segafredo	32
4	Juan Ayuso (ESP)	UAE Team Emirates	30
5	Felix Gall (AUT)	AG2R Citroën Team	20
6	Quinten Hermans (BEL)	Alpecin–Deceuninck	10
7	Stan Dewulf (BEL)	AG2R Citroën Team	10
8	Kristian Sbaragli (ITA)	Alpecin–Deceuninck	9
9	Cian Uijtdebroeks (BEL)	Bora–Hansgrohe	6
10	Michael Gogl (AUT)	Alpecin–Deceuninck	6

=== Mountains classification ===
Final mountains classification (1–10)
Rank	Rider	Team	Points
1	Pascal Eenkhoorn (NED)	Lotto–Dstny	44
2	Sergio Higuita (COL)	Bora–Hansgrohe	28
3	Juan Ayuso (ESP)	UAE Team Emirates	26
4	Felix Gall (AUT)	AG2R Citroën Team	24
5	Nickolas Zukowsky (CAN)	Q36.5 Pro Cycling Team	17
6	Wout van Aert (BEL)	Team Jumbo–Visma	16
7	Wilco Kelderman (NED)	Team Jumbo–Visma	14
8	Julien Bernard (FRA)	Trek–Segafredo	13
9	Mattias Skjelmose (DEN)	Trek–Segafredo	12
10	Silvan Dillier (SUI)	Alpecin–Deceuninck	12

=== Young rider classification ===
Final young rider classification (1–10)
Rank	Rider	Team	Time
1	Mattias Skjelmose (DEN)	Trek–Segafredo	21h 17' 19"
2	Juan Ayuso (ESP)	UAE Team Emirates	+ 9"
3	Remco Evenepoel (BEL)	Soudal–Quick-Step	+ 45"
4	Cian Uijtdebroeks (BEL)	Bora–Hansgrohe	+ 3' 04"
5	Felix Gall (AUT)	AG2R Citroën Team	+ 3' 25"
6	Romain Grégoire (FRA)	Groupama–FDJ	+ 8' 42"
7	Welay Berhe (ETH)	Team Jayco–AlUla	+ 11' 22"
8	Tom Pidcock (GBR)	INEOS Grenadiers	+ 21' 32"
9	Kevin Vermaerke (USA)	Team DSM	+ 29' 32"
10	Ewen Costiou (FRA)	Arkéa–Samsic	+ 33' 45"

=== Team classification ===
Final team classification (1–10)
Rank	Team	Time
1	(France) AG2R Citroën Team	64h 28' 19"
2	Israel–Premier Tech	+ 2' 35"
3	(United Kingdom) INEOS Grenadiers	+ 5' 22"
4	(Australia) Team Jayco–AlUla	+ 6' 19"
5	(Germany) Bora–Hansgrohe	+ 9' 35"
6	(France) Groupama–FDJ	+ 11' 04"
7	(United States) EF Education–EasyPost	+ 14' 58"
8	(Belgium) Soudal–Quick-Step	+ 19' 12"
9	(United States) Trek–Segafredo	+ 19' 30"
10	(Netherlands) Team Jumbo–Visma	+ 23' 43"
