= 2026 Étoile de Bessèges =

French multi-day road cycling race

2026 UCI Europe Tour

Race details
- Dates: 4–8 February 2026
- Stages: 5
- Distance: 640.3 km (397.9 mi)
- Winning time: 13h 59' 22"

Results
Jersey awarded to the overall winner	Winner	Ewen Costiou (FRA)	(Groupama–FDJ United)
	Second	Paul Lapeira (FRA)	(Decathlon CMA CGM)
	Third	Maxime Decomble (FRA)	(Groupama–FDJ United)
Jersey awarded to the points classification winner	Points	Lukáš Kubiš (SVK)	(Unibet Rose Rockets)
Jersey awarded to the mountains classification winner	Mountains	Victor Papon (FRA)	(Nice Métropole Côte d'Azur)
Jersey awarded to the youth classification winner	Youth	Maxime Decomble (FRA)	(Groupama–FDJ United)
	Team	(France) Groupama–FDJ United	

The 2026 Étoile de Bessèges – Tour du Gard (transl. Star of Bessèges – Tour of Gard) was a road cycling stage race that took place between 4 and 8 February 2026 almost entirely within the French department of Gard. The race was rated as a category 2.1 event on the 2026 UCI Europe Tour calendar and was the 56th edition of the Étoile de Bessèges.

== Teams ==
Four UCI WorldTeams, seven UCI ProTeams, and five UCI Continental teams make up the sixteen teams that participated in the race.

UCI WorldTeams

- Alpecin–Premier Tech
- Decathlon CMA CGM
- Groupama–FDJ United
- Lotto–Intermarché

UCI ProTeams

- Cofidis
- Pinarello–Q36.5 Pro Cycling Team
- Solution Tech NIPPO Rali
- Team Flanders–Baloise
- Team Polti VisitMalta
- Team TotalEnergies
- Unibet Rose Rockets

UCI Continental Teams

- CIC Pro Cycling Academy
- Elite Fondations Cycling Team
- Nice Métropole Côte d'Azur
- St. Michel–Preference Home–Auber93
- Van Rysel–Roubaix

== Route ==
Stage characteristics and winners
Stage	Date	Course	Distance	Type	Stage winner
1	4 February	Bellegarde to Bellegarde	150.1 km (93.3 mi)	Hilly stage	Tom Crabbe (BEL)
2	5 February	Saint-Gilles to Domessargues	162.8 km (101.2 mi)	Hilly stage	Mathieu Kockelmann (LUX)
3	6 February	Bessèges to Bessèges	162.3 km (100.8 mi)	Hilly stage	Henri Uhlig (GER)
4	7 February	Saint-Christol-lès-Alès to Vauvert	154.8 km (96.2 mi)	Hilly stage	Joppe Heremans (BEL)
5	8 February	Alès to Alès	10.3 km (6.4 mi)	Individual time trial	Ewen Costiou (FRA)
Total			640.3 km (397.9 mi)		

== Stages ==
=== Stage 1 ===
4 February 2026 – Bellegarde to Bellegarde, 150.1 km (93.3 mi)

Stage 1 Result
Rank	Rider	Team	Time
1	Tom Crabbe (BEL)	Team Flanders–Baloise	3h 16' 04"
2	Lukáš Kubiš (SVK)	Unibet Rose Rockets	+ 0"
3	Clément Izquierdo (FRA)	Cofidis	+ 2"
4	Maxime Decomble (FRA)	Groupama–FDJ United	+ 2"
5	Paul Lapeira (FRA)	Decathlon CMA CGM	+ 2"
6	Sandy Dujardin (FRA)	Team TotalEnergies	+ 2"
7	Léandre Lozouet (FRA)	CIC Pro Cycling Academy	+ 2"
8	Louis Hardouin (FRA)	Van Rysel–Roubaix	+ 2"
9	Matys Grisel (FRA)	Lotto–Intermarché	+ 2"
10	Joppe Heremans (BEL)	Van Rysel–Roubaix	+ 2"

General classification after Stage 1
Rank	Rider	Team	Time
1	Tom Crabbe (BEL)	Team Flanders–Baloise	3h 15' 54"
2	Lukáš Kubiš (SVK)	Unibet Rose Rockets	+ 4"
3	Clément Izquierdo (FRA)	Cofidis	+ 8"
4	Maxime Decomble (FRA)	Groupama–FDJ United	+ 12"
5	Paul Lapeira (FRA)	Decathlon CMA CGM	+ 12"
6	Sandy Dujardin (FRA)	Team TotalEnergies	+ 12"
7	Léandre Lozouet (FRA)	CIC Pro Cycling Academy	+ 12"
8	Louis Hardouin (FRA)	Van Rysel–Roubaix	+ 12"
9	Matys Grisel (FRA)	Lotto–Intermarché	+ 12"
10	Joppe Heremans (BEL)	Van Rysel–Roubaix	+ 12"

=== Stage 2 ===
5 February 2026 – Saint-Gilles to Domessargues, 162.8 km (101.2 mi)

Stage 2 Result
Rank	Rider	Team	Time
1	Mathieu Kockelmann (LUX)	Lotto–Intermarché	3h 32' 48"
2	Dylan Groenewegen (NED)	Unibet Rose Rockets	+ 0"
3	Matteo Moschetti (ITA)	Pinarello–Q36.5 Pro Cycling Team	+ 0"
4	Rasmus Søjberg Pedersen (DEN)	Decathlon CMA CGM	+ 0"
5	Henri Uhlig (GER)	Alpecin–Premier Tech	+ 0"
6	Elmar Reinders (NED)	Unibet Rose Rockets	+ 0"
7	Alexis Renard (FRA)	Cofidis	+ 0"
8	Kilian Théot (FRA)	Van Rysel–Roubaix	+ 0"
9	Lukáš Kubiš (SVK)	Unibet Rose Rockets	+ 0"
10	Cyril Barthe (FRA)	Groupama–FDJ United	+ 0"

General classification after Stage 2
Rank	Rider	Team	Time
1	Tom Crabbe (BEL)	Team Flanders–Baloise	6h 48' 42"
2	Lukáš Kubiš (SVK)	Unibet Rose Rockets	+ 4"
3	Clément Izquierdo (FRA)	Cofidis	+ 8"
4	Mathieu Kockelmann (LUX)	Lotto–Intermarché	+ 10"
5	Matys Grisel (FRA)	Lotto–Intermarché	+ 12"
6	Francisco Muñoz (ESP)	Team Polti VisitMalta	+ 12"
7	Sandy Dujardin (FRA)	Team TotalEnergies	+ 12"
8	Louis Hardouin (FRA)	Van Rysel–Roubaix	+ 12"
9	Léandre Lozouet (FRA)	CIC Pro Cycling Academy	+ 12"
10	Paul Lapeira (FRA)	Decathlon CMA CGM	+ 12"

=== Stage 3 ===
6 February 2026 – Bessèges to Bessèges, 162.3 km (100.8 mi)

Stage 3 Result
Rank	Rider	Team	Time
1	Henri Uhlig (GER)	Alpecin–Premier Tech	3h 36' 50"
2	Lukáš Kubiš (SVK)	Unibet Rose Rockets	+ 0"
3	Louis Hardouin (FRA)	Van Rysel–Roubaix	+ 0"
4	Victor Loulergue (FRA)	Groupama–FDJ United	+ 0"
5	Jenthe Biermans (BEL)	Cofidis	+ 0"
6	Léandre Lozouet (FRA)	CIC Pro Cycling Academy	+ 0"
7	Andrea Mifsud (MLT)	Team Polti VisitMalta	+ 0"
8	Andrea Piras (ITA)	Solution Tech NIPPO Rali	+ 0"
9	Noa Isidore (FRA)	Decathlon CMA CGM	+ 0"
10	Matys Grisel (FRA)	Lotto–Intermarché	+ 0"

General classification after Stage 3
Rank	Rider	Team	Time
1	Lukáš Kubiš (SVK)	Unibet Rose Rockets	10h 25' 30"
2	Henri Uhlig (GER)	Alpecin–Premier Tech	+ 7"
3	Louis Hardouin (FRA)	Van Rysel–Roubaix	+ 10"
4	Clément Izquierdo (FRA)	Cofidis	+ 10"
5	Mathieu Kockelmann (LUX)	Lotto–Intermarché	+ 12"
6	Matys Grisel (FRA)	Lotto–Intermarché	+ 14"
7	Sandy Dujardin (FRA)	Team TotalEnergies	+ 14"
8	Léandre Lozouet (FRA)	CIC Pro Cycling Academy	+ 14"
9	Francisco Muñoz (ESP)	Team Polti VisitMalta	+ 14"
10	Ewen Costiou (FRA)	Groupama–FDJ United	+ 14"

=== Stage 4 ===
7 February 2026 – Saint-Christol-lès-Alès to Vauvert, 154.8 km (96.2 mi)

Stage 4 Result
Rank	Rider	Team	Time
1	Joppe Heremans (BEL)	Van Rysel–Roubaix	3h 18' 41"
2	Lukáš Kubiš (SVK)	Unibet Rose Rockets	+ 0"
3	Paul Lapeira (FRA)	Decathlon CMA CGM	+ 0"
4	Matteo Moschetti (ITA)	Pinarello–Q36.5 Pro Cycling Team	+ 0"
5	Louis Hardouin (FRA)	Van Rysel–Roubaix	+ 0"
6	Mathieu Kockelmann (LUX)	Lotto–Intermarché	+ 0"
7	Axel Huens (FRA)	Groupama–FDJ United	+ 0"
8	Léandre Lozouet (FRA)	CIC Pro Cycling Academy	+ 0"
9	Sandy Dujardin (FRA)	Team TotalEnergies	+ 0"
10	Henri Uhlig (GER)	Alpecin–Premier Tech	+ 0"

General classification after Stage 4
Rank	Rider	Team	Time
1	Lukáš Kubiš (SVK)	Unibet Rose Rockets	13h 44' 05"
2	Henri Uhlig (GER)	Alpecin–Premier Tech	+ 13"
3	Louis Hardouin (FRA)	Van Rysel–Roubaix	+ 16"
4	Clément Izquierdo (FRA)	Cofidis	+ 16"
5	Paul Lapeira (FRA)	Decathlon CMA CGM	+ 16"
6	Mathieu Kockelmann (LUX)	Lotto–Intermarché	+ 18"
7	Sandy Dujardin (FRA)	Team TotalEnergies	+ 20"
8	Matys Grisel (FRA)	Lotto–Intermarché	+ 20"
9	Léandre Lozouet (FRA)	CIC Pro Cycling Academy	+ 20"
10	Francisco Muñoz (ESP)	Team Polti VisitMalta	+ 20"

=== Stage 5 ===
8 February 2026 – Alès to Alès, 10.3 km (6.4 mi), (ITT)

Stage 5 Result
Rank	Rider	Team	Time
1	Ewen Costiou (FRA)	Groupama–FDJ United	14' 57"
2	Maxime Decomble (FRA)	Groupama–FDJ United	+ 5"
3	Paul Lapeira (FRA)	Decathlon CMA CGM	+ 6"
4	Niklas Larsen (DEN)	Unibet Rose Rockets	+ 14"
5	Jordan Labrosse (FRA)	Decathlon CMA CGM	+ 19"
6	Sander De Pestel (BEL)	Decathlon CMA CGM	+ 21"
7	Wessel Mouris (NED)	Unibet Rose Rockets	+ 21"
8	Dylan Teuns (BEL)	Cofidis	+ 22"
9	Victor Loulergue (FRA)	Groupama–FDJ United	+ 23"
10	Xabier Azparren (ESP)	Pinarello–Q36.5 Pro Cycling Team	+ 23"

General classification after Stage 5
Rank	Rider	Team	Time
1	Ewen Costiou (FRA)	Groupama–FDJ United	13h 59' 22"
2	Paul Lapeira (FRA)	Decathlon CMA CGM	+ 2"
3	Maxime Decomble (FRA)	Groupama–FDJ United	+ 12"
4	Lukáš Kubiš (SVK)	Unibet Rose Rockets	+ 15"
5	Niklas Larsen (DEN)	Unibet Rose Rockets	+ 17"
6	Dylan Teuns (BEL)	Cofidis	+ 32"
7	Mathieu Kockelmann (LUX)	Lotto–Intermarché	+ 32"
8	Clément Izquierdo (FRA)	Cofidis	+ 36"
9	Xabier Azparren (ESP)	Pinarello–Q36.5 Pro Cycling Team	+ 38"
10	Léandre Lozouet (FRA)	CIC Pro Cycling Academy	+ 39"

== Classification leadership table ==
Classification leadership by stage
Stage	Winner	General classification (Note: The general classification leader's jersey is known as the coral jersey.)	Points classification	Mountains classification	Young rider classification	Team classification
1	Tom Crabbe	Tom Crabbe	Tom Crabbe	Victor Vercouillie	Tom Crabbe	Unibet Rose Rockets
2	Mathieu Kockelmann	Tom Crabbe	Lukáš Kubiš	Maël Guégan	Tom Crabbe	Unibet Rose Rockets
3	Henri Uhlig	Lukáš Kubiš	Lukáš Kubiš	Victor Papon	Mathieu Kockelmann	Unibet Rose Rockets
4	Joppe Heremans	Lukáš Kubiš	Lukáš Kubiš	Victor Papon	Mathieu Kockelmann	Team Polti VisitMalta
5	Ewen Costiou	Ewen Costiou	Lukáš Kubiš	Victor Papon	Maxime Decomble	Groupama–FDJ United
Final		Ewen Costiou	Lukáš Kubiš	Victor Papon	Maxime Decomble	Groupama–FDJ United

== Classification standings ==
Legend
Denotes the winner of the general classification	Denotes the winner of the points classification
Denotes the winner of the mountains classification	Denotes the winner of the young rider classification

=== General classification ===
Final general classification (1–10)
Rank	Rider	Team	Time
1	Ewen Costiou (FRA)	Groupama–FDJ United	13h 59' 22"
2	Paul Lapeira (FRA)	Decathlon CMA CGM	+ 2"
3	Maxime Decomble (FRA)	Groupama–FDJ United	+ 12"
4	Lukáš Kubiš (SVK)	Unibet Rose Rockets	+ 15"
5	Niklas Larsen (DEN)	Unibet Rose Rockets	+ 17"
6	Dylan Teuns (BEL)	Cofidis	+ 32"
7	Mathieu Kockelmann (LUX)	Lotto–Intermarché	+ 32"
8	Clément Izquierdo (FRA)	Cofidis	+ 36"
9	Xabier Azparren (ESP)	Pinarello–Q36.5 Pro Cycling Team	+ 38"
10	Léandre Lozouet (FRA)	CIC Pro Cycling Academy	+ 39"

=== Points classification ===
Final points classification (1–10)
Rank	Rider	Team	Points
1	Lukáš Kubiš (SVK)	Unibet Rose Rockets	68
2	Henri Uhlig (GER)	Alpecin–Premier Tech	46
3	Paul Lapeira (FRA)	Decathlon CMA CGM	44
4	Mathieu Kockelmann (LUX)	Lotto–Intermarché	37
5	Louis Hardouin (FRA)	Van Rysel–Roubaix	36
6	Maxime Decomble (FRA)	Groupama–FDJ United	34
7	Joppe Heremans (BEL)	Van Rysel–Roubaix	31
8	Ewen Costiou (FRA)	Groupama–FDJ United	30
9	Matteo Moschetti (ITA)	Pinarello–Q36.5 Pro Cycling Team	30
10	Léandre Lozouet (FRA)	CIC Pro Cycling Academy	27

=== Mountains classification ===
Final mountains classification (1–10)
Rank	Rider	Team	Points
1	Victor Papon (FRA)	Nice Métropole Côte d'Azur	28
2	Ewen Costiou (FRA)	Groupama–FDJ United	22
3	Paul Lapeira (FRA)	Decathlon CMA CGM	18
4	Maël Guégan (FRA)	CIC Pro Cycling Academy	12
5	Alexys Brunel (FRA)	Team TotalEnergies	12
6	Kasper Haugland (NOR)	Decathlon CMA CGM	12
7	Ramses Debruyne (BEL)	Alpecin–Premier Tech	10
8	Maxime Decomble (FRA)	Groupama–FDJ United	8
9	Arnaud Tendon (SUI)	Van Rysel–Roubaix	7
10	Tommaso Bessega (ITA)	Team Polti VisitMalta	6

=== Young rider classification ===
Final young rider classification (1–10)
Rank	Rider	Team	Time
1	Maxime Decomble (FRA)	Groupama–FDJ United	13h 59' 34"
2	Mathieu Kockelmann (LUX)	Lotto–Intermarché	+ 20"
3	Léandre Lozouet (FRA)	CIC Pro Cycling Academy	+ 27"
4	Matys Grisel (FRA)	Lotto–Intermarché	+ 1' 01"
5	Baptiste Gillet (FRA)	Nice Métropole Côte d'Azur	+ 1' 46"
6	Victor Loulergue (FRA)	Groupama–FDJ United	+ 2' 11"
7	Noa Isidore (FRA)	Decathlon CMA CGM	+ 3' 34"
8	Nils Aebersold (SUI)	Elite Fondations Cycling Team	+ 6' 51"
9	Joppe Heremans (BEL)	Van Rysel–Roubaix	+ 7' 31"
10	Dario Giuliano (FRA)	Team Polti VisitMalta	+ 8' 14"

=== Teams classification ===
Final teams classification (1–10)
Rank	Team	Time
1	(France) Groupama–FDJ United	41h 58' 56"
2	(France) Unibet Rose Rockets	+ 35"
3	(France) Decathlon CMA CGM	+ 53"
4	(Italy) Team Polti VisitMalta	+ 1' 26"
5	(France) Cofidis	+ 2' 02"
6	(Belgium) Lotto–Intermarché	+ 2' 21"
7	(France) Team TotalEnergies	+ 2' 27"
8	(Belgium) Team Flanders–Baloise	+ 2' 53"
9	(France) Nice Métropole Côte d'Azur	+ 3' 36"
10	(Switzerland) Elite Fondations Cycling Team	+ 3' 39"
