= Henri Uhlig =

German cyclist

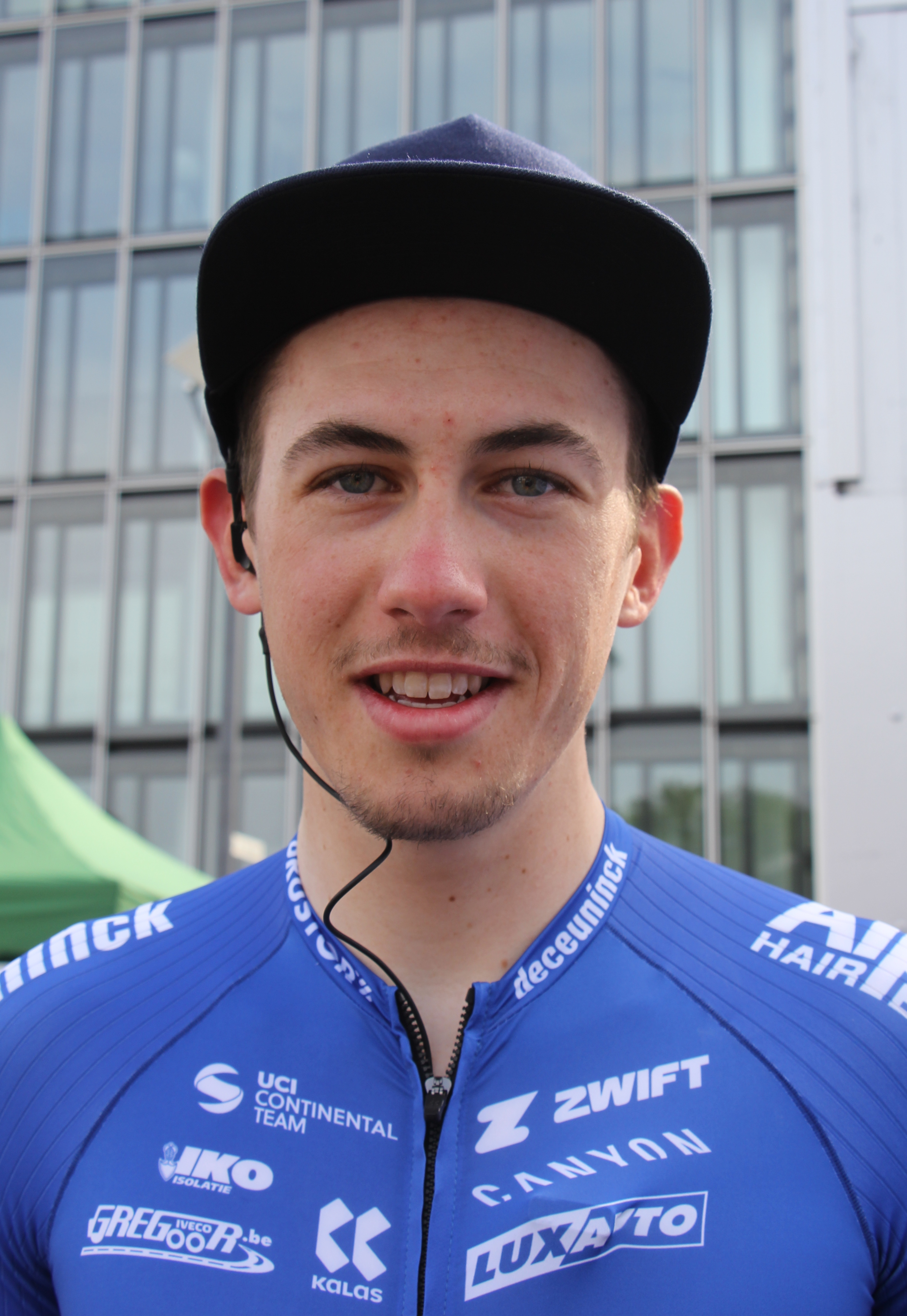
- Uhlig in 2023

Personal information
- Full name: Henri Uhlig
- Born: 1 August 2001 (age 25) Regensburg, Germany
- Height: 1.81 m (5 ft 11 1/2 in)
- Weight: 71 kg (157 lb; 11 st 3 lb)

Cycling career
- Sport: Cycling
- Current team: Alpecin–Premier Tech
- Disciplines: Road; Track; Cyclo-cross
- Role: Rider

Amateur team
- 2019: Team Drinkuth-ABUS-Focus

Professional teams
- 2020–2021: Rad-Net Rose Team
- 2022–2023: Alpecin–Fenix Development Team
- 2024–: Alpecin–Deceuninck

Henri Uhlig (born 1 August 2001) is a German cyclist, who currently rides for UCI WorldTeam Alpecin–Premier Tech.

In November 2021, Uhlig signed a one-year contract with the development team of UCI WorldTeam Alpecin–Deceuninck, to commence from the start of the 2022 season. He stepped up to UCI WorldTeam Alpecin–Deceuninck for the 2024 season.

== Professional career ==
In September 2018, Uhlig started training to become a police officer with the Bavarian Bereitschaftspolizei (English: Riot Police). The training took place in Dachau as part of the Bavarian top sports promotion program. He completed his education in February 2023.

== Major results ==
=== Road ===
2018
1st Sprints classification, Grand Prix Rüebliland
8th Overall Internationale Cottbuser Junioren-Etappenfahrt
2019
9th Overall Sint-Martinusprijs Kontich
2022
1st Stage 1 Alpes Isère Tour
1st Gran Premio della Liberazione
2023
2nd Overall Baltic Chain Tour

1st Points classification
1st Young rider classification
1st Stage 2

3rd Kattekoers
4th Road race, National Under-23 Championships
5th Overall Tour de Bretagne
10th Road race, UEC European Under-23 Championships
2024
3rd Volta NXT Classic
2025
4th Rund um Köln
8th Volta NXT Classic
2026 (1 pro win)
1st Stage 3 Étoile de Bessèges
4th Grand Prix de Denain
5th Hamburg Cyclassics

=== Cyclo-cross ===
2018–2019
3rd National Junior Championships
3rd Herforder Silvester, Deutschland Cup

=== Track ===
2018
1st Omnium, National Junior Championships
2021
1st Derny, National Championships
