= Paris–Tours Espoirs =

French one-day road cycling race

Race details
- Date: October
- Region: France
- English name: Paris–Tours Prospects
- Discipline: Road race
- Competition: UCI Europe Tour
- Type: Single day race
- Web site: www.letour.com/2013/PAE/LIVE/us/le_parcours.html

History
- First edition: 1991
- Editions: 35 (as of 2025)
- First winner: Lars Michaelsen (DEN)
- Most wins: No repeat winners
- Most recent: Maxime Decomble (FRA)

Paris–Tours Espoirs (English: Paris–Tours Prospects) is a French single-day road cycling race held every October from the outskirts of Paris to the cathedral city of Tours. It is organised by the Amaury Sport Organisation.

The race is held as a 1.2U race on the UCI Europe Tour – for riders 23 years old or under – and is held on the same day as the elite Paris–Tours event; although this is held over a longer course than the espoir race.

== Winners ==
Year	Country	Rider	Team
1991	Denmark	Lars Michaelsen	
1992	Latvia	Arvis Piziks	
1993	France	Cyril Saugrain	
1994	France	Nicolas Jalabert	
1995	France	Pascal Giguet	
1996	France	Franck Perque	
1997	Netherlands	Miguel van Kessel	
1998	Norway	Thor Hushovd	
1999	Belgium	Gorik Gardeyn	
2000	Belgium	Tom Boonen	
2001	France	Samuel Dumoulin	VC Lyon-Vaulx-en-Velin
2002	France	Maryan Hary	Vendée U-Pays de la Loire
2003	France	Mathieu Claude	Vendée U-Pays de la Loire
2004	France	Vincent Jérôme	Vendée U-Pays de la Loire
2005	France	Fabien Patanchon	Entente Sud Gascogne
2006	Netherlands	Huub Duyn	Rabobank Continental Team
2007	Belgium	Jürgen Roelandts	Davitamon–Win for Life–Jong Vlaanderen
2008	France	Tony Gallopin	Comité d'Ile de France
2009	France	Mathieu Halleguen	Côtes d'Armor Cyclisme
2010	Belgium	Jelle Wallays	Beveren 2000-Quick Step
2011	France	Fabien Schmidt	Team UC Nantes Atlantique
2012	France	Taruia Krainer	Vendée U-Pays de la Loire
2013	France	Flavien Dassonville	Comité d'Ile de France
2014	Netherlands	Mike Teunissen	Rabobank Development Team
2015	Netherlands	Sam Oomen	Rabobank Development Team
2016	Netherlands	Arvid de Kleijn	Cyclingteam Jo Piels
2017	Belgium	Jasper Philipsen	BMC Development Team
2018	Netherlands	Marten Kooistra	SEG Racing Academy
2019	France	Alexys Brunel	Equipe continentale Groupama–FDJ
2020	Belgium	Rune Herregodts	Home Solution-Soenens
2021	Norway	Jonas Iversby Hvideberg	Uno-X Pro Cycling Team
2022	Norway	Per Strand Hagenes	Jumbo–Visma Development Team
2023	Norway	Sakarias Koller Løland	Uno-X Dare Development Team
2024	France	Antoine L'Hote	Decathlon–AG2R La Mondiale Development Team
2025	France	Maxime Decomble	Equipe continentale Groupama–FDJ
