= Cian Uijtdebroeks =

Belgian road cyclist (born 2003)

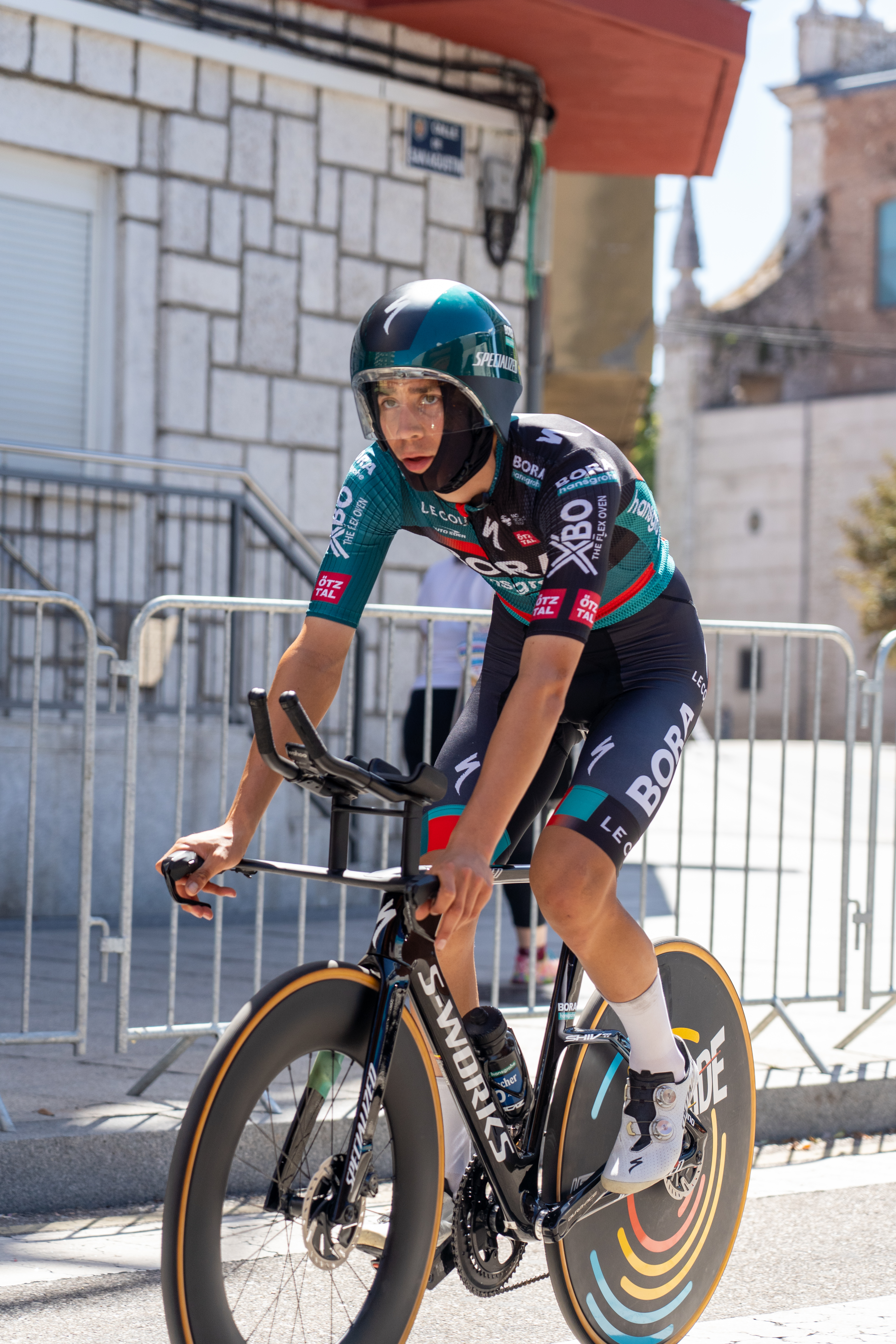
- Uijtdebroeks at the 2023 Vuelta a España

Personal information
- Born: 28 February 2003 (age 23) Abolens, Belgium
- Height: 1.85 m (6 ft 1 in)
- Weight: 68 kg (150 lb)

Cycling career
- Sport: Cycling
- Current team: Movistar Team
- Discipline: Road
- Role: Rider
- Rider type: Climber

Amateur teams
- 2018–2019: Sprint 2000 Charleroi
- 2020: Acrog–Tormans Balen BC
- 2021: Team Auto Eder

Professional teams
- 2022–2023: Bora–Hansgrohe
- 2024–2025: Visma–Lease a Bike
- 2026-: Movistar Team
Medal record
Road cycling
Representing Belgium
European Junior Championships
Silver medal – second place	2021 Trentino	Time trial

Cian Uijtdebroeks (born 28 February 2003) is a Belgian road cyclist, who currently rides for UCI WorldTeam Movistar Team. Uijtdebroeks is considered to be a very promising talent, and has been compared to Remco Evenepoel.

== Career ==
He made his professional debut in 2022 and won the Tour de l'Avenir. He made headlines at the 2023 Vuelta a Espana where he finished eighth overall in his grand tour debut. In December 2023 he signed for Team Jumbo–Visma on a four-year deal until 2027, but his current team, Bora–Hansgrohe, would dispute this, saying that he was contracted through 2024 with the team. Eventually, the parties reached an agreement for Cian to ride with Visma–Lease a Bike in 2024.

Uijtdebroeks missed most of the 2025 season due to injury, first to a back injury and then injuries related to being hit by a car.

== Major results ==
2020
1st Kuurne–Brussels–Kuurne Juniors
9th Time trial, UEC European Junior Road Championships
2021
1st Time trial, National Junior Road Championships
1st Overall Aubel–Thimister–Stavelot

1st Mountains classification
1st Stage 2 (TTT)

1st Grand Prix West Bohemia
1st La Classique des Alpes Juniors
2nd Time trial, UEC European Junior Road Championships
2nd Overall Ain Bugey Valromey Tour

1st Mountains classification
1st Stage 2

2nd Excellenze Valli del Soligo
2nd Trofeo Guido Dorigo–Solighetto
3rd Overall Course de la Paix Juniors

1st Stage 2a (ITT)

6th Time trial, UCI Junior Road World Championships
2022
1st Overall Tour de l'Avenir

1st Mountains classification
1st Young rider classification
1st Stages 7 & 8

3rd Overall Sibiu Cycling Tour

1st Young rider classification

7th Per sempre Alfredo
8th Overall Tour of Norway
2023
6th Overall Tour de Romandie
7th Overall Tour de Suisse
8th Overall Vuelta a España
9th Overall Volta a Catalunya
9th Overall Tour of Oman
2024
5th Overall O Gran Camiño
7th Overall Tirreno–Adriatico
Giro d'Italia

Held after Stages 2–6 & 8–10

2025 (2 pro wins)
1st Overall Tour de l'Ain

1st Mountains classification
1st Young rider classification
1st Stage 3

2nd Overall Czech Tour

1st Young rider classification

5th Overall Tour of Oman
5th Overall Okolo Slovenska

1st Young rider classification

6th Overall Tour of Guangxi
8th Giro dell'Emilia
9th Clásica de San Sebastián
10th Giro di Lombardia
2026
5th Milano–Torino
7th Overall Tour Auvergne-Rhône-Alpes
8th Overall Volta a Catalunya

=== General classification results timeline ===
Grand Tour general classification results
Grand Tour	2023	2024	2025	2026
Giro d'Italia	—	DNF	—	—
Tour de France	—	—	—	DNF
Vuelta a España	8	DNF	—	
Major stage race general classification results
Race	2023	2024	2025	2026
Paris–Nice	—	—	—	—
Tirreno–Adriatico	—	7	DNF	—
Volta a Catalunya	9	DNF	—	8
Tour of the Basque Country	—	—	—	12
Tour de Romandie	6	—	—	—
Tour Auvergne-Rhone Alpes	—	—	—	7
Tour de Suisse	7	35	—	—

Legend
—	Did not compete
DNF	Did not finish
