= Maxime Decomble =

French cyclist

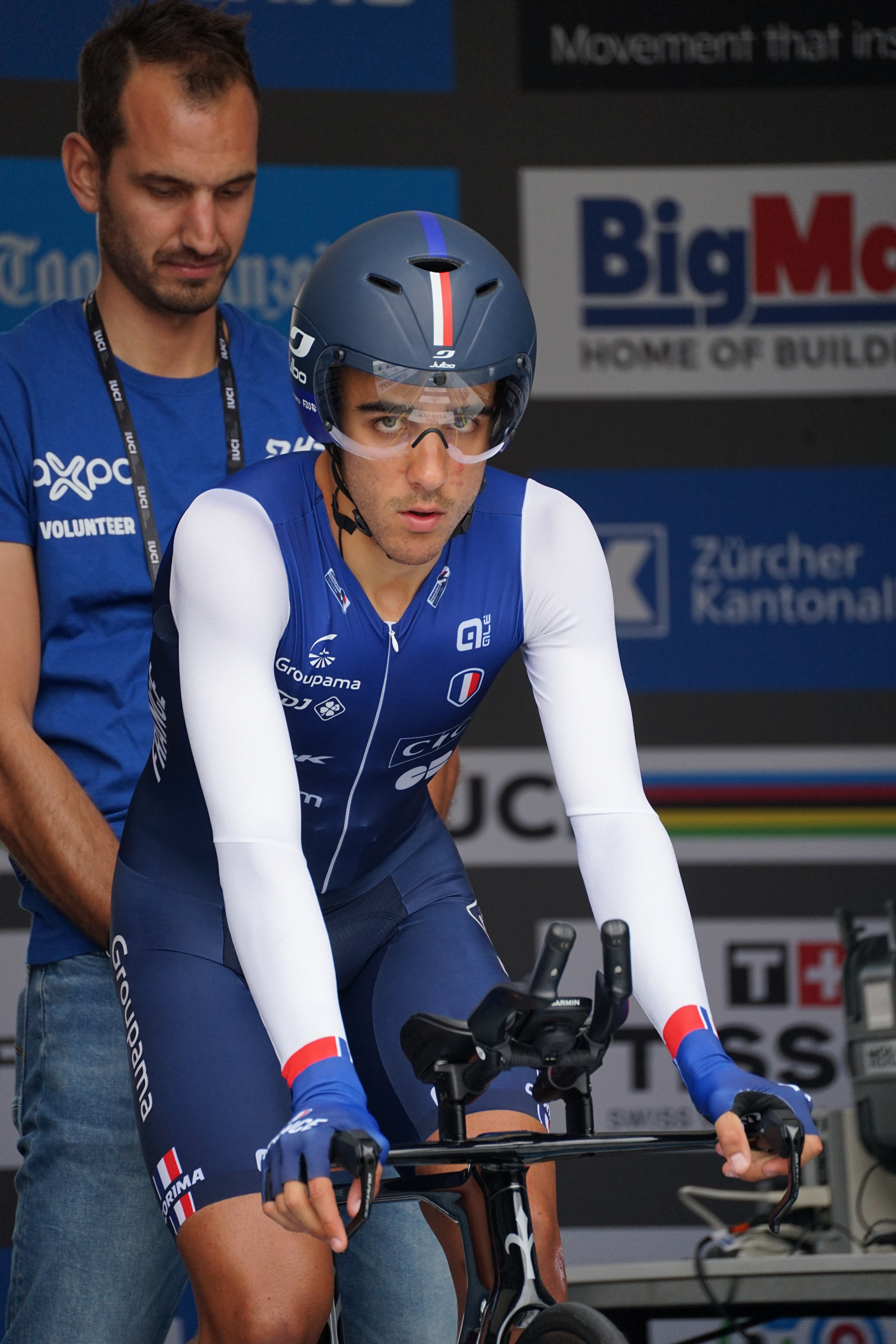
- Decomble at the 2024 UCI Road World Championships

Personal information
- Born: 16 July 2005 (age 21) La Ciotat, France
- Height: 1.74 m (5 ft 9 in)
- Weight: 62 kg (137 lb)

Cycling career
- Sport: Cycling
- Current team: Groupama–FDJ United
- Discipline: Road
- Role: Rider

Amateur team
- 2022–2023: VC La Pomme Marseille U19

Professional teams
- 2024–2025: Équipe Continentale Groupama–FDJ
- 2026–: Groupama–FDJ United
Medal record
Representing France
Men's road bicycle racing
World Championships
Bronze medal – third place	2025 Kigali	Under-23 time trial
European Championships
Silver medal – second place	2025 Guilherand-Granges	Under-23 road race
Bronze medal – third place	2023 Drenthe	Junior team relay
Bronze medal – third place	2026 Ljubljana	Time trial

Maxime Decomble (born 16 July 2005) is a French cyclist, who currently rides for UCI WorldTeam Groupama–FDJ United.

== Major results ==
2022
1st Overall Volta Ciclista al Penedès

1st Points classification
1st Young rider classification
1st Stages 1 & 2 (ITT)

1st Clásica de Navarra
1st Championnat de Region Sud PACA Juniors
1st GP Pontevés
1st Stage 1 (ITT) Grand Prix de la Région Sud
1st Stage 2 (ITT) Tour du Pays d'Olliergues
2nd Overall Tour du Valromey

1st Mountains classification
1st Young rider classification

5th La Classique des Alpes Juniors
2023
1st Overall Tour du Léman Juniors

1st Stage 1 (ITT)

1st Overall Tour des Alpes de Haute Provence

1st Stage 2

1st Overall Les Boucles de l'Oise Juniors
1st Stage 1 (ITT) Tour de la Vallée de la Trambouze
3rd Team relay, UEC European Junior Road Championships
3rd Giro di Primavera
7th Overall Giro della Lunigiana

1st Stage 2

7th Overall Gipuzkoa Klasikoa
2024
1st Time trial, National Under-23 Road Championships
2025
1st Paris–Tours Espoirs
UEC European Under-23 Road Championships

2nd Road race
4th Time trial

2nd Time trial, National Under-23 Road Championships
2nd Overall Alpes Isère Tour
3rd Time trial, UCI Road World Under-23 Championships
4th Liège–Bastogne–Liège Espoirs
5th Overall Tour de l'Avenir
10th Overall Tour Alsace
2026 (2 pro wins)
1st Overall Tour Poitou-Charentes en Nouvelle-Aquitaine

1st Young rider classification
1st Stage 3 (ITT)

3rd Time trial, UEC European Road Championships
3rd Overall Étoile de Bessèges

1st Young rider classification

3rd Overall Okolo Slovenska
4th Time trial, National Road Championships
