= Lorenzo Germani =

Italian cyclist

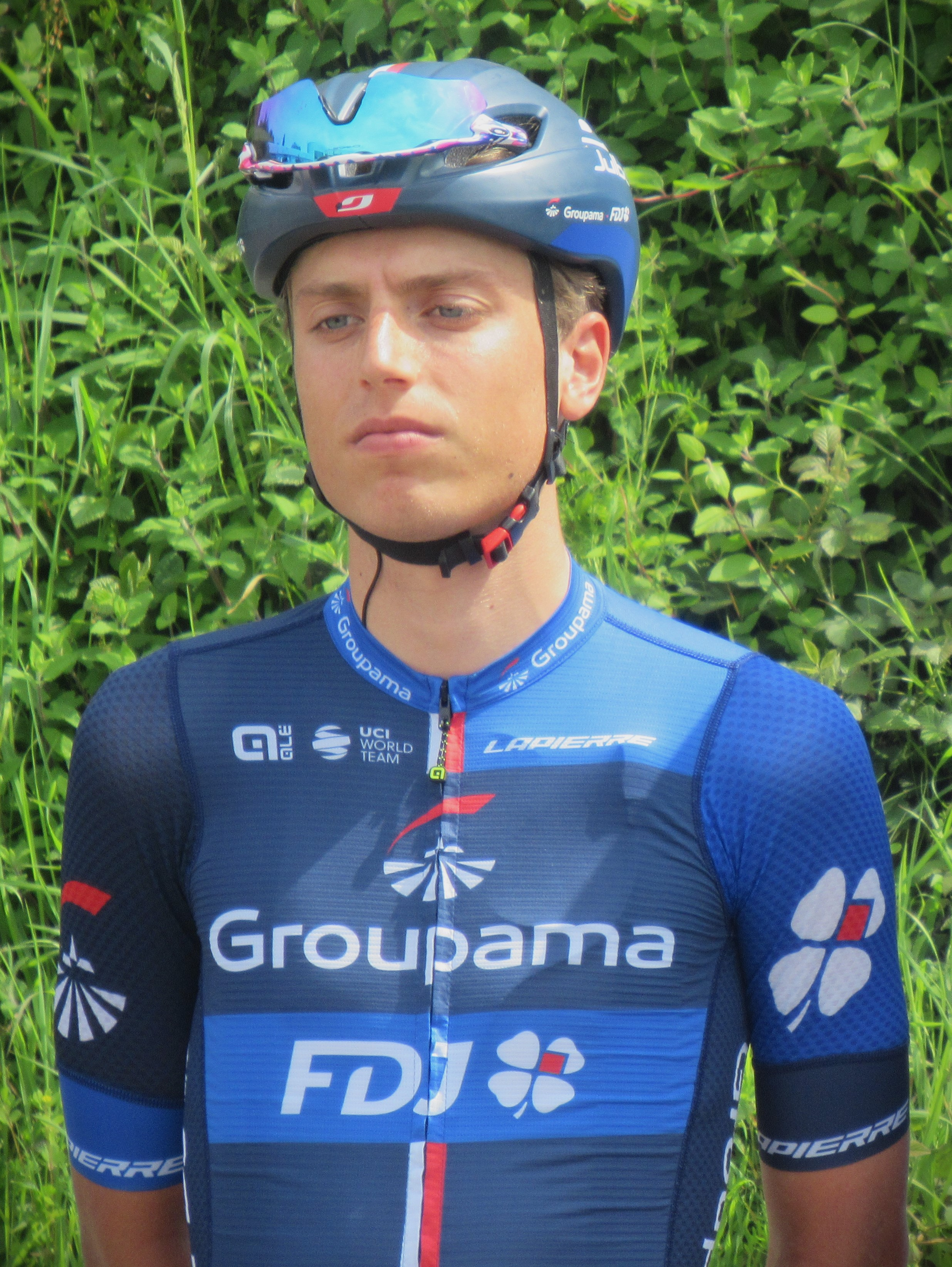

Personal information
- Born: 3 March 2002 (age 24) Sora, Lazio, Italy
- Height: 1.80 m (5 ft 11 in)
- Weight: 62 kg (137 lb)

Cycling career
- Sport: Cycling
- Current team: Groupama–FDJ United
- Discipline: Road
- Role: Rider

Professional teams
- 2021–2022: Équipe Continentale Groupama–FDJ
- 2023–: Groupama–FDJ

Lorenzo Germani (born 3 March 2002) is an Italian road cyclist, who currently rides for UCI WorldTeam Groupama–FDJ United. On 3 August 2022 Groupama–FDJ announced they had signed Germani to their UCI WorldTeam for the 2023 season alongside six other riders on their development team.

== Major results ==
2020
2nd Road race, National Junior Road Championships
2021
2nd Overall Tour du Pays de Montbéliard
2022
1st Road race, National Under-23 Road Championships
1st Stage 2 Giro della Valle d'Aosta
4th Flèche Ardennaise
7th Giro del Belvedere
2025
4th Veneto Classic

=== Grand Tour general classification results timeline ===
| Grand Tour | 2023 | 2024 |
|---|---|---|
| Giro d'Italia | — | 87 |
| Tour de France | — | — |
| Vuelta a España | 85 | — |

Legend
| — | Did not compete |
| DNF | Did not finish |
