= 2026 European Road Championships – Men's time trial =

Men's elite time trial
2026 European Road Championships

Race details
- Dates: 7 October 2026
- Stages: 1
- Distance: 22 km (14 mi)
- Winning time: 28:16.61

Medalists
| | Gold | Primož Roglič (SLO) |
| | Silver | Bruno Armirail (FRA) |
| | Bronze | Maxime Decomble (FRA) |

The men's elite time trial at the 2026 European Road Championships took place on 7 October 2026, in Ljubljana, Slovenia.

== Results ==
| Rank | # | Cyclist | Nation | Time | Diff. |
|---|---|---|---|---|---|
| 1st place, gold medalist(s) | 5 | Primož Roglič | Slovenia | 28:16.61 | |
| 2nd place, silver medalist(s) | 12 | Bruno Armirail | France | 28:23.19 | +00:06.58 |
| 3rd place, bronze medalist(s) | 19 | Maxime Decomble | France | 28:45.03 | +00:28.42 |
| 4 | 15 | Ilan Van Wilder | Belgium | 28:49.97 | +00:33.36 |
| 5 | 2 | Stefan Küng | Switzerland | 28:51.87 | +00:35.26 |
| 6 | 3 | Kasper Asgreen | Denmark | 29:01.52 | +00:44.91 |
| 7 | 26 | Marco Frigo | Italy | 29:11.97 | +00:55.36 |
| 8 | 1 | Jakob Söderqvist | Sweden | 29:12.34 | +00:55.73 |
| 9 | 4 | Callum Thornley | Great Britain | 29:12.77 | +00:56.16 |
| 10 | 7 | Iván Romeo | Spain | 29:14.06 | +00:57.45 |
| 11 | 18 | Aleksandr Vlasov | Individual Neutral Athletes | 29:14.84 | +00:58.23 |
| 12 | 6 | Mikkel Bjerg | Denmark | 29:15.30 | +00:58.69 |
| 13 | 17 | Felix Großschartner | Austria | 29:18.19 | +01:01.58 |
| 14 | 13 | Mauro Schmid | Switzerland | 29:23.61 | +01:07.00 |
| 15 | 10 | Nelson Oliveira | Portugal | 29:24.05 | +01:07.44 |
| 16 | 8 | Mattia Cattaneo | Italy | 29:27.63 | +01:11.02 |
| 17 | 25 | Sander De Pestel | Belgium | 29:29.91 | +01:13.30 |
| 18 | 9 | Jan Tratnik | Slovenia | 29:39.77 | +01:23.16 |
| 19 | 14 | Marco Brenner | Germany | 29:44.07 | +01:27.46 |
| 20 | 33 | Tiago Antunes | Portugal | 29:44.14 | +01:27.53 |
| 21 | 20 | Alex Kirsch | Luxembourg | 29:53.16 | +01:36.55 |
| 22 | 29 | Miguel Heidemann | Germany | 29:53.71 | +01:37.10 |
| 23 | 22 | Sjoerd Bax | Norway | 29:55.66 | +01:39.05 |
| 24 | 11 | Michał Kwiatkowski | Poland | 30:03.71 | +01:47.10 |
| 25 | 32 | Mathieu Kockelmann | Luxembourg | 30:16.23 | +01:59.62 |
| 26 | 36 | Axel Källberg | Finland | 30:55.30 | +02:38.69 |
| 27 | 21 | János Pelikán | Hungary | 31:07.55 | +02:54.94 |
| 28 | 28 | Aivaras Mikutis | Lithuania | 31:08.07 | +02:51.46 |
| 29 | 37 | Dávid Kaško | Slovakia | 31:17.90 | +03:01.29 |
| 30 | 24 | Burak Abay | Turkey | 31:29.52 | +03:12.91 |
| 31 | 30 | Andreas Miltiadis | Cyprus | 31:32.01 | +03:15.40 |
| 32 | 34 | Heorhii Antonenko | Ukraine | 31:44.89 | +03:28.28 |
| 33 | 38 | Catalin Buta | Romania | 32:14.68 | +03:58.07 |
| 34 | 23 | Filip Maciejuk | Poland | 32:26.54 | +04:09.93 |
| 35 | 40 | Ghennadii Morgun | Moldova | 33:24.48 | +05:07.87 |
| 36 | 42 | Samet Bulut | Turkey | 34:23.76 | +06:07.15 |
| 37 | 39 | Borislav Palashev | Bulgaria | 34:54.10 | +06:37.49 |
| 38 | 44 | Albion Kastrati | Kosovo | 35:54.35 | +07:37.74 |
| 39 | 41 | Blerton Nuha | Kosovo | 36:53.23 | +08:36.62 |
| 40 | 41 | Kristinn Jónsson | Iceland | 36:54.90 | +08:38.29 |
| 41 | 35 | Miloš Lazarević | Serbia | 37:51.35 | +09:34.74 |
| 42 | 43 | Nofal Nuriyev | Azerbaijan | 37:56.95 | +9:40.34 |
| | 27 | Rainer Kepplinger | Austria | DNF | |
| | 16 | Mathias Vacek | Czechia | DNS | |
