= 2023 Volta a Catalunya =

Spanish cycling race

2023 UCI World Tour, race 9 of 35

Race details
- Dates: 20–26 March 2023
- Stages: 7
- Distance: 1,185.3 km (736.5 mi)
- Winning time: 28h 19' 10"

Results
Jersey awarded to the overall winner	Winner	Primož Roglič (SLO)	(Team Jumbo–Visma)
	Second	Remco Evenepoel (BEL)	(Soudal–Quick-Step)
	Third	João Almeida (POR)	(UAE Team Emirates)
Jersey awarded to the points classification winner	Points	Primož Roglič (SLO)	(Team Jumbo–Visma)
Jersey awarded to the mountains classification winner	Mountains	Remco Evenepoel (BEL)	(Soudal–Quick-Step)
Jersey awarded to the youth classification winner	Youth	Remco Evenepoel (BEL)	(Soudal–Quick-Step)
Jersey awarded to the team classification winner	Team	(United Arab Emirates) UAE Team Emirates	

The 2023 Volta a Catalunya was a road cycling stage race that took place between 20 and 26 March. It was the 102nd edition of Volta a Catalunya and the 9th race of the 2023 UCI World Tour.

== Teams ==
All 18 UCI WorldTeams and seven UCI ProTeams made up the 25 teams that participated in the race.

UCI WorldTeams

- AG2R Citroën Team
- Alpecin–Deceuninck
- Arkéa–Samsic
- Astana Qazaqstan Team
- Bora–Hansgrohe
- Cofidis
- EF Education–EasyPost
- Groupama–FDJ
- Ineos Grenadiers
- Intermarché–Circus–Wanty
- Movistar Team
- Soudal–Quick-Step
- Team Bahrain Victorious
- Team DSM
- Team Jayco–AlUla
- Team Jumbo–Visma
- Trek–Segafredo
- UAE Team Emirates

UCI ProTeams

- Burgos BH
- Caja Rural–Seguros RGA
- Equipo Kern Pharma
- Euskaltel–Euskadi
- Israel–Premier Tech
- Lotto–Dstny
- Uno-X Pro Cycling Team

== Route ==
Stage characteristics and winners
Stage	Date	Course	Distance	Type	Winner
1	20 March	Sant Feliu de Guíxols to Sant Feliu de Guíxols	164.6 km (102.3 mi)	Medium-mountain stage	Primož Roglič (SLO)
2	21 March	Mataró to Vallter	165.4 km (102.8 mi)	Mountain stage	Giulio Ciccone (ITA)
3	22 March	Olost to La Molina	180.6 km (112.2 mi)	Mountain stage	Remco Evenepoel (BEL)
4	23 March	Llívia to Sabadell	188.2 km (116.9 mi)	Flat stage	Kaden Groves (AUS)
5	24 March	Tortosa (Terres de l'Ebre) to Lo Port (Terres de l'Ebre)	176.6 km (109.7 mi)	Mountain stage	Primož Roglič (SLO)
6	25 March	Martorell to Molins de Rei	174.1 km (108.2 mi)	Flat stage	Kaden Groves (AUS)
7	26 March	Barcelona to Barcelona	135.8 km (84.4 mi)	Medium-mountain stage	Remco Evenepoel (BEL)
Total			1,185.3 km (736.5 mi)		

== Stages ==
=== Stage 1 ===
20 March 2023 — Sant Feliu de Guíxols to Sant Feliu de Guíxols, 164.5 km (102.2 mi)

Stage 1 Result (1–10)
Rank	Rider	Team	Time
1	Primož Roglič (SLO)	Team Jumbo–Visma	3h 48' 17"
2	Remco Evenepoel (BEL)	Soudal–Quick-Step	+ 0"
3	Ide Schelling (NED)	Bora–Hansgrohe	+ 0"
4	Maxim Van Gils (BEL)	Lotto–Dstny	+ 0"
5	Giulio Ciccone (ITA)	Trek–Segafredo	+ 0"
6	Ethan Hayter (GBR)	Ineos Grenadiers	+ 0"
7	Dorian Godon (FRA)	AG2R Citroën Team	+ 0"
8	Ilan Van Wilder (BEL)	Soudal–Quick-Step	+ 0"
9	Milan Menten (BEL)	Lotto–Dstny	+ 0"
10	Bryan Coquard (FRA)	Cofidis	+ 0"

General classification after Stage 1 (1–10)
Rank	Rider	Team	Time
1	Primož Roglič (SLO)	Team Jumbo–Visma	3h 48' 07"
2	Remco Evenepoel (BEL)	Soudal–Quick-Step	+ 4"
3	Ide Schelling (NED)	Bora–Hansgrohe	+ 6"
4	Maxim Van Gils (BEL)	Lotto–Dstny	+ 10"
5	Giulio Ciccone (ITA)	Trek–Segafredo	+ 10"
6	Ethan Hayter (GBR)	Ineos Grenadiers	+ 10"
7	Dorian Godon (FRA)	AG2R Citroën Team	+ 10"
8	Ilan Van Wilder (BEL)	Soudal–Quick-Step	+ 10"
9	Milan Menten (BEL)	Lotto–Dstny	+ 10"
10	Bryan Coquard (FRA)	Cofidis	+ 10"

=== Stage 2 ===
21 March 2023 — Mataró to Vallter, 165.5 km (102.8 mi)

Stage 2 Result (1–10)
Rank	Rider	Team	Time
1	Giulio Ciccone (ITA)	Trek–Segafredo	4h 13' 37"
2	Primož Roglič (SLO)	Team Jumbo–Visma	+ 0"
3	Remco Evenepoel (BEL)	Soudal–Quick-Step	+ 0"
4	Mikel Landa (ESP)	Team Bahrain Victorious	+ 11"
5	Adam Yates (GBR)	UAE Team Emirates	+ 11"
6	João Almeida (POR)	UAE Team Emirates	+ 11"
7	Esteban Chaves (COL)	EF Education–EasyPost	+ 15"
8	Michael Woods (CAN)	Israel–Premier Tech	+ 15"
9	Jai Hindley (AUS)	Bora–Hansgrohe	+ 15"
10	Cian Uijtdebroeks (BEL)	Bora–Hansgrohe	+ 15"

General classification after Stage 2 (1–10)
Rank	Rider	Team	Time
1	Primož Roglič (SLO)	Team Jumbo–Visma	8h 01' 38"
2	Remco Evenepoel (BEL)	Soudal–Quick-Step	+ 6"
3	Giulio Ciccone (ITA)	Trek–Segafredo	+ 6"
4	Mikel Landa (ESP)	Team Bahrain Victorious	+ 27"
5	João Almeida (POR)	UAE Team Emirates	+ 27"
6	Michael Woods (CAN)	Israel–Premier Tech	+ 31"
7	Jai Hindley (AUS)	Bora–Hansgrohe	+ 31"
8	Esteban Chaves (COL)	EF Education–EasyPost	+ 31"
9	Cian Uijtdebroeks (BEL)	Bora–Hansgrohe	+ 41"
10	Marc Soler (ESP)	UAE Team Emirates	+ 46"

=== Stage 3 ===
22 March 2023 — Olost to La Molina, 180.5 km (112.2 mi)

Stage 3 Result (1–10)
Rank	Rider	Team	Time
1	Remco Evenepoel (BEL)	Soudal–Quick-Step	4h 40' 43"
2	Primož Roglič (SLO)	Team Jumbo–Visma	+ 2"
3	Giulio Ciccone (ITA)	Trek–Segafredo	+ 13"
4	Jai Hindley (AUS)	Bora–Hansgrohe	+ 13"
5	João Almeida (POR)	UAE Team Emirates	+ 13"
6	Mikel Landa (ESP)	Team Bahrain Victorious	+ 13"
7	Michael Woods (CAN)	Israel–Premier Tech	+ 13"
8	Cian Uijtdebroeks (BEL)	Bora–Hansgrohe	+ 13"
9	Esteban Chaves (COL)	EF Education–EasyPost	+ 13"
10	Romain Bardet (FRA)	Team DSM	+ 13"

General classification after Stage 3 (1–10)
Rank	Rider	Team	Time
1	Primož Roglič (SLO)	Team Jumbo–Visma	12h 42' 17"
2	Remco Evenepoel (BEL)	Soudal–Quick-Step	+ 0"
3	Giulio Ciccone (ITA)	Trek–Segafredo	+ 19"
4	Mikel Landa (ESP)	Team Bahrain Victorious	+ 44"
5	João Almeida (POR)	UAE Team Emirates	+ 44"
6	Jai Hindley (AUS)	Bora–Hansgrohe	+ 48"
7	Michael Woods (CAN)	Israel–Premier Tech	+ 48"
8	Esteban Chaves (COL)	EF Education–EasyPost	+ 48"
9	Cian Uijtdebroeks (BEL)	Bora–Hansgrohe	+ 58"
10	Marc Soler (ESP)	UAE Team Emirates	+ 1' 12"

=== Stage 4 ===
23 March 2023 — Llívia to Sabadell, 188 km (117 mi)

Stage 4 Result (1–10)
Rank	Rider	Team	Time
1	Kaden Groves (AUS)	Alpecin–Deceuninck	4h 19' 37"
2	Bryan Coquard (FRA)	Cofidis	+ 0"
3	Corbin Strong (NZL)	Israel–Premier Tech	+ 0"
4	Ide Schelling (NED)	Bora–Hansgrohe	+ 0"
5	Clément Venturini (FRA)	AG2R Citroën Team	+ 0"
6	Frederik Wandahl (DEN)	Bora–Hansgrohe	+ 0"
7	Jon Aberasturi (ESP)	Trek–Segafredo	+ 0"
8	Milan Menten (BEL)	Lotto–Dstny	+ 0"
9	Arne Marit (BEL)	Intermarché–Circus–Wanty	+ 0"
10	Simone Velasco (ITA)	Astana Qazaqstan Team	+ 0"

General classification after Stage 4 (1–10)
Rank	Rider	Team	Time
1	Primož Roglič (SLO)	Team Jumbo–Visma	17h 01' 54"
2	Remco Evenepoel (BEL)	Soudal–Quick-Step	+ 0"
3	Giulio Ciccone (ITA)	Trek–Segafredo	+ 19"
4	Mikel Landa (ESP)	Team Bahrain Victorious	+ 44"
5	João Almeida (POR)	UAE Team Emirates	+ 44"
6	Michael Woods (CAN)	Israel–Premier Tech	+ 48"
7	Jai Hindley (AUS)	Bora–Hansgrohe	+ 48"
8	Esteban Chaves (COL)	EF Education–EasyPost	+ 48"
9	Cian Uijtdebroeks (BEL)	Bora–Hansgrohe	+ 58"
10	Marc Soler (ESP)	UAE Team Emirates	+ 1' 12"

=== Stage 5 ===
24 March 2023 — Tortosa (Terres de l'Ebre) to Lo Port (Terres de l'Ebre), 176.5 km (109.7 mi)

Stage 5 Result (1–10)
Rank	Rider	Team	Time
1	Primož Roglič (SLO)	Team Jumbo–Visma	4h 27' 41"
2	Remco Evenepoel (BEL)	Soudal–Quick-Step	+ 6"
3	João Almeida (POR)	UAE Team Emirates	+ 12"
4	Marc Soler (ESP)	UAE Team Emirates	+ 28"
5	Rigoberto Urán (COL)	EF Education–EasyPost	+ 44"
6	Lenny Martinez (FRA)	Groupama–FDJ	+ 47"
7	Mikel Landa (ESP)	Team Bahrain Victorious	+ 56"
8	Michael Woods (CAN)	Israel–Premier Tech	+ 56"
9	Jai Hindley (AUS)	Bora–Hansgrohe	+ 1' 04"
10	Cian Uijtdebroeks (BEL)	Bora–Hansgrohe	+ 1' 15"

General classification after Stage 5 (1–10)
Rank	Rider	Team	Time
1	Primož Roglič (SLO)	Team Jumbo–Visma	21h 29' 25"
2	Remco Evenepoel (BEL)	Soudal–Quick-Step	+ 10"
3	João Almeida (POR)	UAE Team Emirates	+ 1' 02"
4	Mikel Landa (ESP)	Team Bahrain Victorious	+ 1' 50"
5	Marc Soler (ESP)	UAE Team Emirates	+ 1' 50"
6	Michael Woods (CAN)	Israel–Premier Tech	+ 1' 54"
7	Giulio Ciccone (ITA)	Trek–Segafredo	+ 1' 57"
8	Jai Hindley (AUS)	Bora–Hansgrohe	+ 2' 02"
9	Cian Uijtdebroeks (BEL)	Bora–Hansgrohe	+ 2' 23"
10	Rigoberto Urán (COL)	EF Education–EasyPost	+ 2' 44"

=== Stage 6 ===
25 March 2023 — Martorell to Molins de Rei, 183 km (114 mi)

Stage 6 Result (1–10)
Rank	Rider	Team	Time
1	Kaden Groves (AUS)	Alpecin–Deceuninck	3h 50' 32"
2	Bryan Coquard (FRA)	Cofidis	+ 0"
3	Ide Schelling (NED)	Bora–Hansgrohe	+ 0"
4	Maxim Van Gils (BEL)	Lotto–Dstny	+ 0"
5	Remco Evenepoel (BEL)	Soudal–Quick-Step	+ 0"
6	Andreas Kron (DEN)	Lotto–Dstny	+ 0"
7	Dorian Godon (FRA)	AG2R Citroën Team	+ 0"
8	Patrick Konrad (AUT)	Bora–Hansgrohe	+ 0"
9	Primož Roglič (SLO)	Team Jumbo–Visma	+ 0"
10	Finn Fisher-Black (NZL)	UAE Team Emirates	+ 0"

General classification after Stage 6 (1–10)
Rank	Rider	Team	Time
1	Primož Roglič (SLO)	Team Jumbo–Visma	25h 19' 52"
2	Remco Evenepoel (BEL)	Soudal–Quick-Step	+ 10"
3	João Almeida (POR)	UAE Team Emirates	+ 1' 07"
4	Marc Soler (ESP)	UAE Team Emirates	+ 1' 54"
5	Mikel Landa (ESP)	Team Bahrain Victorious	+ 1' 55"
6	Michael Woods (CAN)	Israel–Premier Tech	+ 1' 59"
7	Giulio Ciccone (ITA)	Trek–Segafredo	+ 2' 02"
8	Jai Hindley (AUS)	Bora–Hansgrohe	+ 2' 07"
9	Cian Uijtdebroeks (BEL)	Bora–Hansgrohe	+ 2' 28"
10	Rigoberto Urán (COL)	EF Education–EasyPost	+ 2' 49"

=== Stage 7 ===
26 March 2023 — Barcelona to Barcelona, 136 km (85 mi)

Stage 7 Result (1–10)
Rank	Rider	Team	Time
1	Remco Evenepoel (BEL)	Soudal–Quick-Step	2h 59' 24"
2	Primož Roglič (SLO)	Team Jumbo–Visma	+ 0"
3	Marc Soler (ESP)	UAE Team Emirates	+ 53"
4	Corbin Strong (NZL)	Israel–Premier Tech	+ 58"
5	Giulio Ciccone (ITA)	Trek–Segafredo	+ 58"
6	Andreas Kron (DEN)	Lotto–Dstny	+ 58"
7	Mikel Landa (ESP)	Team Bahrain Victorious	+ 58"
8	David de la Cruz (ESP)	Astana Qazaqstan Team	+ 58"
9	Koen Bouwman (NED)	Team Jumbo–Visma	+ 58"
10	Oscar Onley (GBR)	Team DSM	+ 58"

General classification after Stage 7 (1–10)
Rank	Rider	Team	Time
1	Primož Roglič (SLO)	Team Jumbo–Visma	28h 19' 10"
2	Remco Evenepoel (BEL)	Soudal–Quick-Step	+ 6"
3	João Almeida (POR)	UAE Team Emirates	+ 2' 11"
4	Marc Soler (ESP)	UAE Team Emirates	+ 2' 49"
5	Mikel Landa (ESP)	Team Bahrain Victorious	+ 2' 59"
6	Michael Woods (CAN)	Israel–Premier Tech	+ 3' 03"
7	Giulio Ciccone (ITA)	Trek–Segafredo	+ 3' 06"
8	Jai Hindley (AUS)	Bora–Hansgrohe	+ 3' 11"
9	Cian Uijtdebroeks (BEL)	Bora–Hansgrohe	+ 3' 32"
10	Rigoberto Urán (COL)	EF Education–EasyPost	+ 3' 53"

== Classification leadership table ==
Classification leadership by stage
Stage	Winner	General classification	Points classification	Mountains classification	Young rider classification	Team classification	Combativity award
1	Primož Roglič	Primož Roglič	Primož Roglič	Jetse Bol	Remco Evenepoel	Bora–Hansgrohe	Pau Miquel
2	Giulio Ciccone	Primož Roglič	Primož Roglič	Giulio Ciccone	Remco Evenepoel	UAE Team Emirates	Kiko Galván
3	Remco Evenepoel	Primož Roglič	Primož Roglič	Simone Petilli	Remco Evenepoel	UAE Team Emirates	Richard Carapaz
4	Kaden Groves	Primož Roglič	Primož Roglič	Guillaume Martin	Remco Evenepoel	UAE Team Emirates	Roger Adrià
5	Primož Roglič	Primož Roglič	Primož Roglič	Primož Roglič	Remco Evenepoel	UAE Team Emirates	José Félix Parra
6	Kaden Groves	Primož Roglič	Primož Roglič	Primož Roglič	Remco Evenepoel	UAE Team Emirates	Carlos Verona
7	Remco Evenepoel	Primož Roglič	Primož Roglič	Remco Evenepoel	Remco Evenepoel	UAE Team Emirates	Richard Carapaz
Final		Primož Roglič	Primož Roglič	Remco Evenepoel	Remco Evenepoel	UAE Team Emirates	not awarded

== Classification standings ==
Legend
Denotes the winner of the general classification	Denotes the winner of the young rider classification
Denotes the winner of the points classification	Denotes the winner of the team classification
Denotes the winner of the mountains classification	Denotes the winner of the combativity award

=== General classification ===
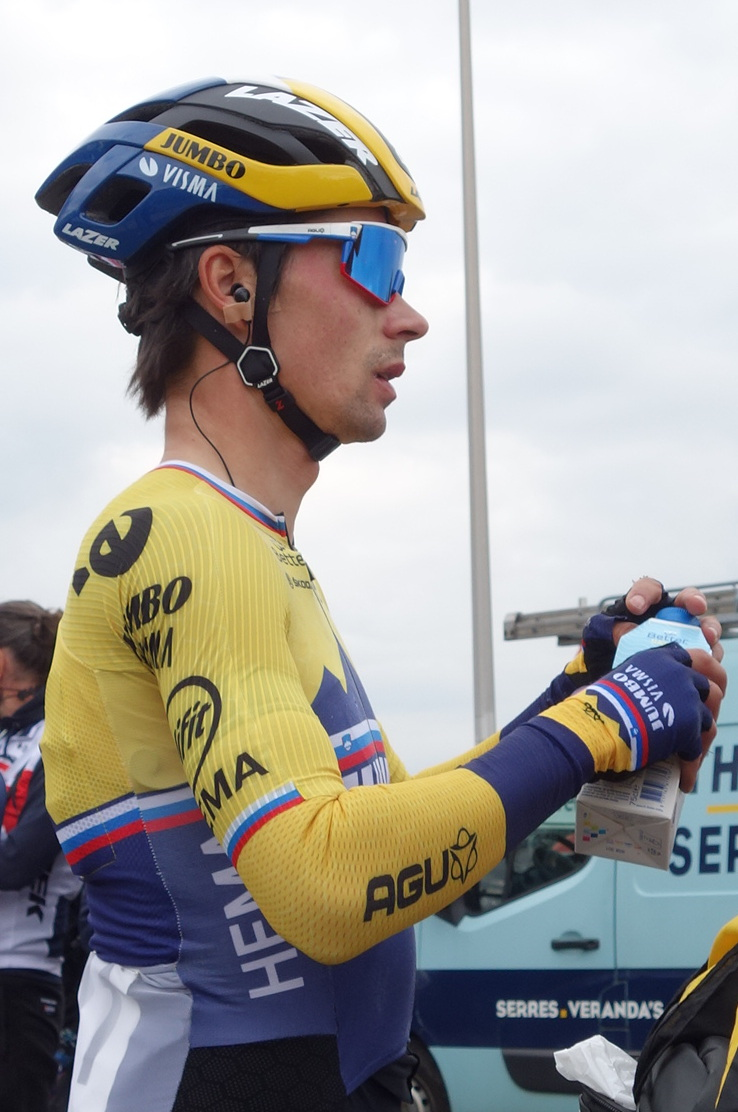
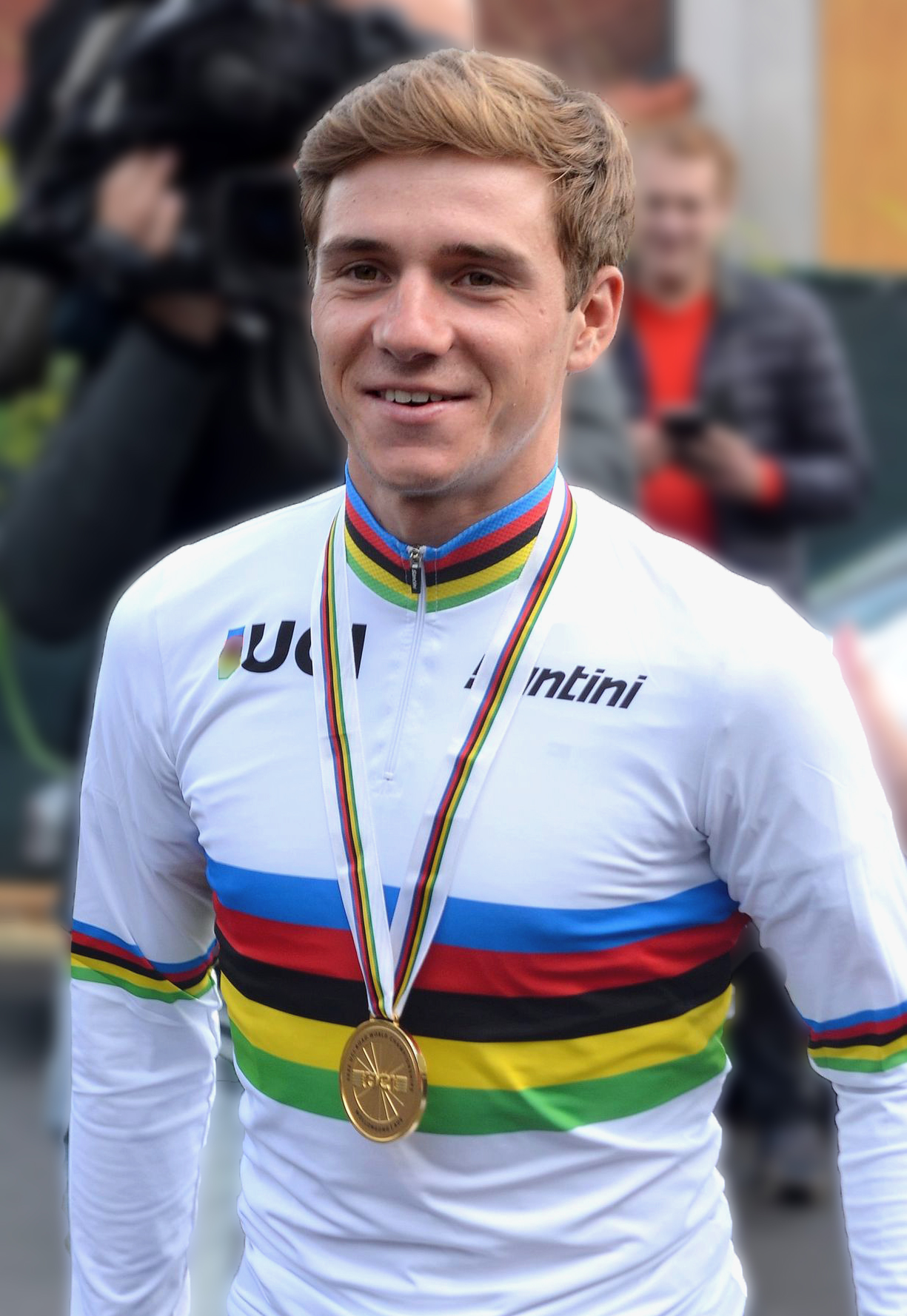
The 2023 Volta turned out to be a duel for the general classification between Primož Roglič and Remco Evenepoel.

Final general classification (1–10)
Rank	Rider	Team	Time
1	Primož Roglič (SLO)	Team Jumbo–Visma	28h 19' 10"
2	Remco Evenepoel (BEL)	Soudal–Quick-Step	+ 6"
3	João Almeida (POR)	UAE Team Emirates	+ 2' 11"
4	Marc Soler (ESP)	UAE Team Emirates	+ 2' 49"
5	Mikel Landa (ESP)	Team Bahrain Victorious	+ 2' 59"
6	Michael Woods (CAN)	Israel–Premier Tech	+ 3' 03"
7	Giulio Ciccone (ITA)	Trek–Segafredo	+ 3' 06"
8	Jai Hindley (AUS)	Bora–Hansgrohe	+ 3' 11"
9	Cian Uijtdebroeks (BEL)	Bora–Hansgrohe	+ 3' 32"
10	Rigoberto Urán (COL)	EF Education–EasyPost	+ 3' 53"

=== Points classification ===
Final points classification (1–10)
Rank	Rider	Team	Time
1	Primož Roglič (SLO)	Team Jumbo–Visma	43
2	Remco Evenepoel (BEL)	Soudal–Quick-Step	41
3	Kaden Groves (AUS)	Alpecin–Deceuninck	20
4	Giulio Ciccone (ITA)	Trek–Segafredo	14
5	Bryan Coquard (FRA)	Cofidis	12
6	Simone Petilli (ITA)	Intermarché–Circus–Wanty	8
7	Ide Schelling (NED)	Bora–Hansgrohe	8
8	Richard Carapaz (ECU)	EF Education–EasyPost	6
9	Héctor Carretero (ESP)	Equipo Kern Pharma	5
10	Marc Soler (ESP)	UAE Team Emirates	5

=== Mountains classification ===
Final mountains classification (1–10)
Rank	Rider	Team	Time
1	Remco Evenepoel (BEL)	Soudal–Quick-Step	69
2	Primož Roglič (SLO)	Team Jumbo–Visma	68
3	Guillaume Martin (FRA)	Cofidis	61
4	Simone Petilli (ITA)	Intermarché–Circus–Wanty	37
5	Giulio Ciccone (ITA)	Trek–Segafredo	32
6	João Almeida (POR)	UAE Team Emirates	29
7	Marc Soler (ESP)	UAE Team Emirates	27
8	Richard Carapaz (ECU)	EF Education–EasyPost	22
9	Maxim Van Gils (BEL)	Lotto–Dstny	20
10	Mikel Landa (ESP)	Team Bahrain Victorious	16

=== Young rider classification ===
Final young rider classification (1–10)
Rank	Rider	Team	Time
1	Remco Evenepoel (BEL)	Soudal–Quick-Step	28h 19' 16"
2	Cian Uijtdebroeks (BEL)	Bora–Hansgrohe	+ 3' 26"
3	Lenny Martinez (FRA)	Groupama–FDJ	+ 4' 19"
4	Lennert Van Eetvelt (BEL)	Lotto–Dstny	+ 6' 21"
5	Oscar Onley (GBR)	Team DSM	+ 25' 45"
6	Ilan Van Wilder (BEL)	Soudal–Quick-Step	+ 29' 19"
7	Hugo Toumire (FRA)	Cofidis	+ 33' 34"
8	Matthew Riccitello (USA)	Israel–Premier Tech	+ 37' 03"
9	Finn Fisher-Black (NZL)	UAE Team Emirates	+ 39' 52"
10	Raúl García Pierna (ESP)	Equipo Kern Pharma	+ 47' 42"

=== Team classification ===
Final team classification (1–10)
Rank	Team	Time
1	(United Arab Emirates) UAE Team Emirates	85h 08' 48"
2	(United States) EF Education–EasyPost	+ 8' 54"
3	(Germany) Bora–Hansgrohe	+ 9' 45"
4	(Spain) Movistar Team	+ 13' 35"
5	Team Bahrain Victorious	+ 15' 59"
6	(France) AG2R Citroën Team	+ 16' 09"
7	(Netherlands) Team Jumbo–Visma	+ 17' 30"
8	(France) Cofidis	+ 32' 43"
9	Israel–Premier Tech	+ 33' 04"
10	(Belgium) Soudal–Quick-Step	+ 40' 36"
