= Léandre Lozouet =

French cyclist

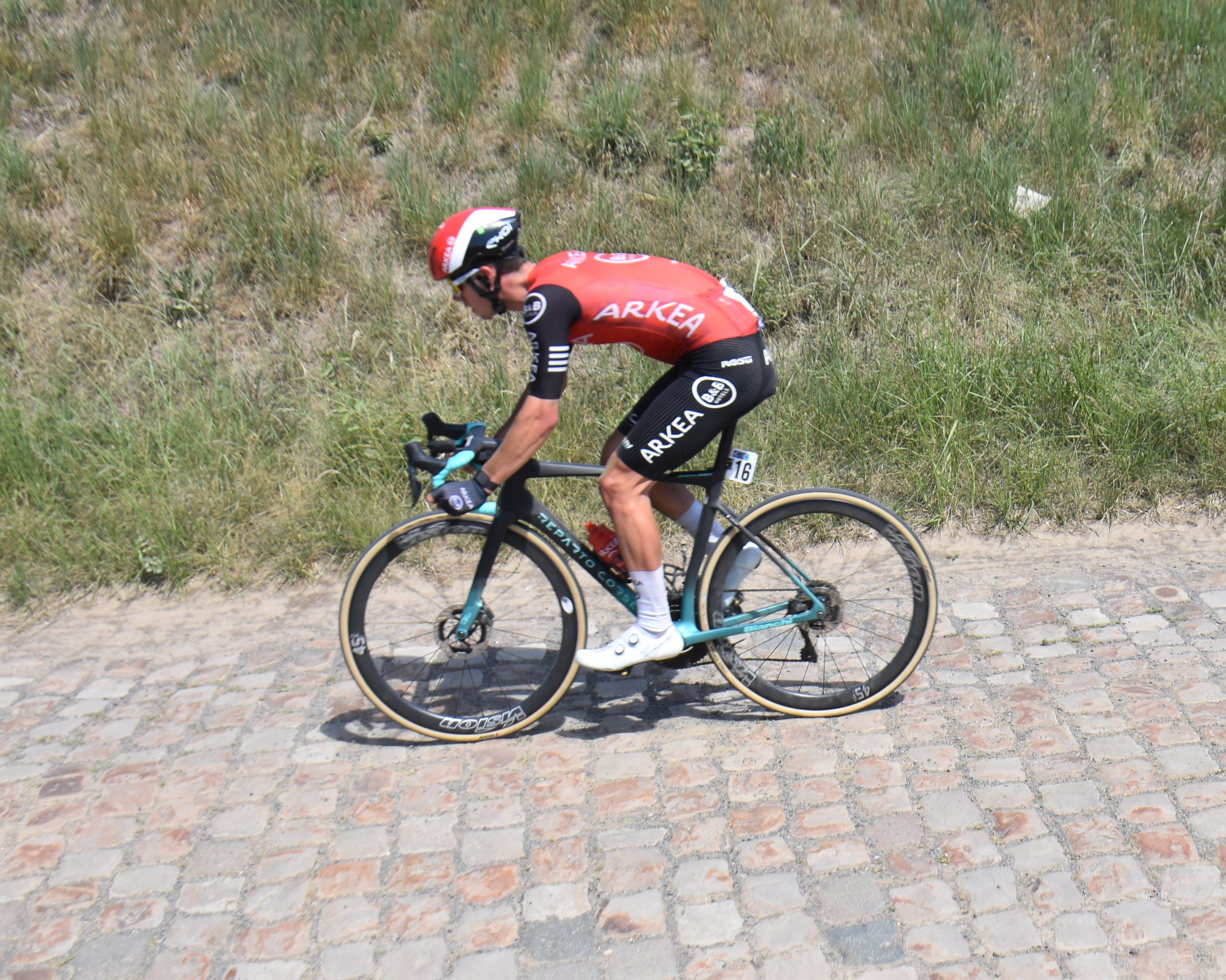
- Lozouet at the 2025 Four Days of Dunkirk

Personal information
- Born: 3 September 2004 (age 22) Cherbourg-Octeville, France
- Height: 1.84 m (6 ft 0 in)

Cycling career
- Sport: Cycling
- Current team: Arkéa–B&B Hotels
- Discipline: Road
- Role: Rider

Amateur teams
- 2021–2022: AG2R Citroën U19 Team
- 2023: VC Rouen 76

Professional teams
- 2024: Arkéa–B&B Hôtels Continentale
- 2025–: Arkéa–B&B Hotels
Medal record
Men's road bicycle racing
Representing France
European Championships
Bronze medal – third place	2024 Limburg	Under-23 road race

Léandre Lozouet (born 3 September 2004) is a French cyclist, who currently rides for UCI WorldTeam Arkéa–B&B Hotels.

== Major results ==
2022
1st Stage 2a (TTT) Aubel–Thimister–Stavelot
3rd Paris–Roubaix Juniors
5th La Route des Géants
7th E3 Saxo Bank Classic Juniors
2023
1st Boucles de l'Austreberthe
2024
3rd Road race, UEC European Under-23 Road Championships
2026
10th Overall Étoile de Bessèges

=== Grand Tour general classification results timeline ===
Grand Tour	2025
Giro d'Italia	—
Tour de France	—
Vuelta a España	120
