= Fabien Schmidt =

French cyclist

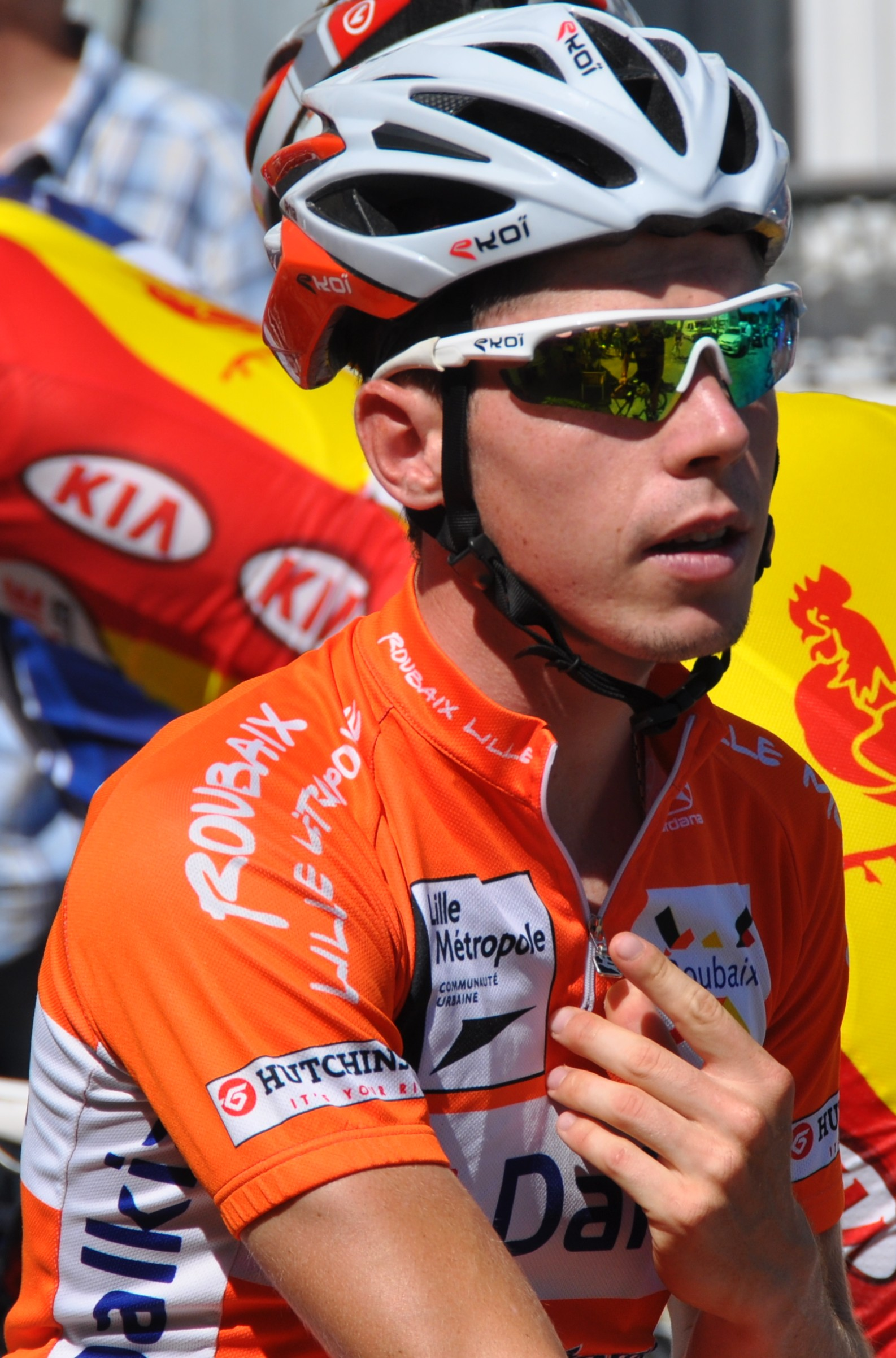
- Schmidt at the 2012 Mi-Août Bretonne.

Personal information
- Full name: Fabien Schmidt
- Born: 23 March 1989 (age 37) Colmar, France

Cycling career
- Sport: Cycling
- Current team: UC Briochine
- Discipline: Road
- Role: Rider

Amateur teams
- 2008–2010: Côtes d'Armor
- 2011: Team UC Nantes Atlantique
- 2011: FDJ (stagiaire)
- 2014: Team UC Nantes Atlantique
- 2015–2018: Côtes d'Armor–Marie Morin
- 2020–: UC Briochine

Professional teams
- 2012: Roubaix–Lille Métropole
- 2013: Sojasun
- 2019: Delko–Marseille Provence

Fabien Schmidt (born 23 March 1989 in Colmar) is a French cyclist, who currently rides for French amateur team UC Briochine. He won the Paris–Tours Espoirs in 2011 and was a stagiaire at FDJ at the end of 2011.

After Sojasun folded at the end of the 2013 season, Schmidt returned to the amateur ranks with Team UC Nantes Atlantique.

== Major results ==
2011
1st Paris–Tours Espoirs
2nd Overall Tour de Gironde
10th Grote Prijs Jef Scherens
2012
3rd Overall Tour du Limousin

1st Young rider classification

5th Grand Prix des Marbriers
7th Overall Mi-Août Bretonne

1st Stage 3

2013
2nd Overall Rhône-Alpes Isère Tour
6th La Roue Tourangelle
9th Clásica de Almería
2014
1st Stage 7 Tour de Bretagne
7th Overall Tour du Loir-et-Cher
2017
7th Overall Tour Alsace
2018
1st Overall Tour de Bretagne
2019
1st Mountains classification Boucles de la Mayenne
2023
8th Grand Prix de Noyal
