= 2025 Veneto Classic =

2025 UCI ProSeries

Race details
- Dates: 19 October 2025
- Stages: 1
- Distance: 178.8 km (111.1 mi)
- Winning time: 4h 04' 37"

Results
	Winner	Sakarias Koller Løland (NOR)	(Uno-X Mobility)
	Second	Florian Vermeersch (BEL)	(UAE Team Emirates XRG)
	Third	Diego Ulissi (ITA)	(XDS Astana Team)

The 2025 Veneto Classic was the 5th edition of the Veneto Classic single-day cycling race. It was held on 19 October 2025, over a distance of 178.8 km, starting in Soave and ending in Bassano del Grappa.

== Teams ==
Six UCI WorldTeams, nine UCI ProTeams, and six UCI Continental teams made up the 21 teams that participated in the race.

UCI WorldTeams

- Alpecin–Deceuninck
- Cofidis
- Groupama–FDJ
- Team Jayco–AlUla
- UAE Team Emirates XRG
- XDS Astana Team

UCI ProTeams

- Burgos Burpellet BH
- Caja Rural–Seguros RGA
- Equipo Kern Pharma
- Lotto
- Q36.5 Pro Cycling Team
- Team Polti VisitMalta
- Tudor Pro Cycling Team
- Uno-X Mobility
- VF Group–Bardiani–CSF–Faizanè

UCI Continental Teams

- Biesse–Carrera–Premac
- General Store–Essegibi–Fratelli Curia
- MBH Bank Ballan CSB
- MG.K Vis Costruzioni e Ambiente
- Petrolike
- S.C. Padovani Polo Cherry Bank

== Results ==
Result
Rank	Rider	Team	Time
1	Sakarias Koller Løland (NOR)	Uno-X Mobility	4h 04' 37"
2	Florian Vermeersch (BEL)	UAE Team Emirates XRG	+ 0"
3	Diego Ulissi (ITA)	XDS Astana Team	+ 0"
4	Lorenzo Germani (ITA)	Groupama–FDJ	+ 11"
5	Davide De Pretto (ITA)	Team Jayco–AlUla	+ 21"
6	Dylan Teuns (BEL)	Cofidis	+ 38"
7	Fredrik Dversnes (NOR)	Uno-X Mobility	+ 43"
8	Eric Fagúndez (URU)	Burgos Burpellet BH	+ 43"
9	Tim Wellens (BEL)	UAE Team Emirates XRG	+ 59"
10	Ramses Debruyne (BEL)	Alpecin–Deceuninck	+ 59"
