= Groupama–FDJ United Continental Team =

French cycling team

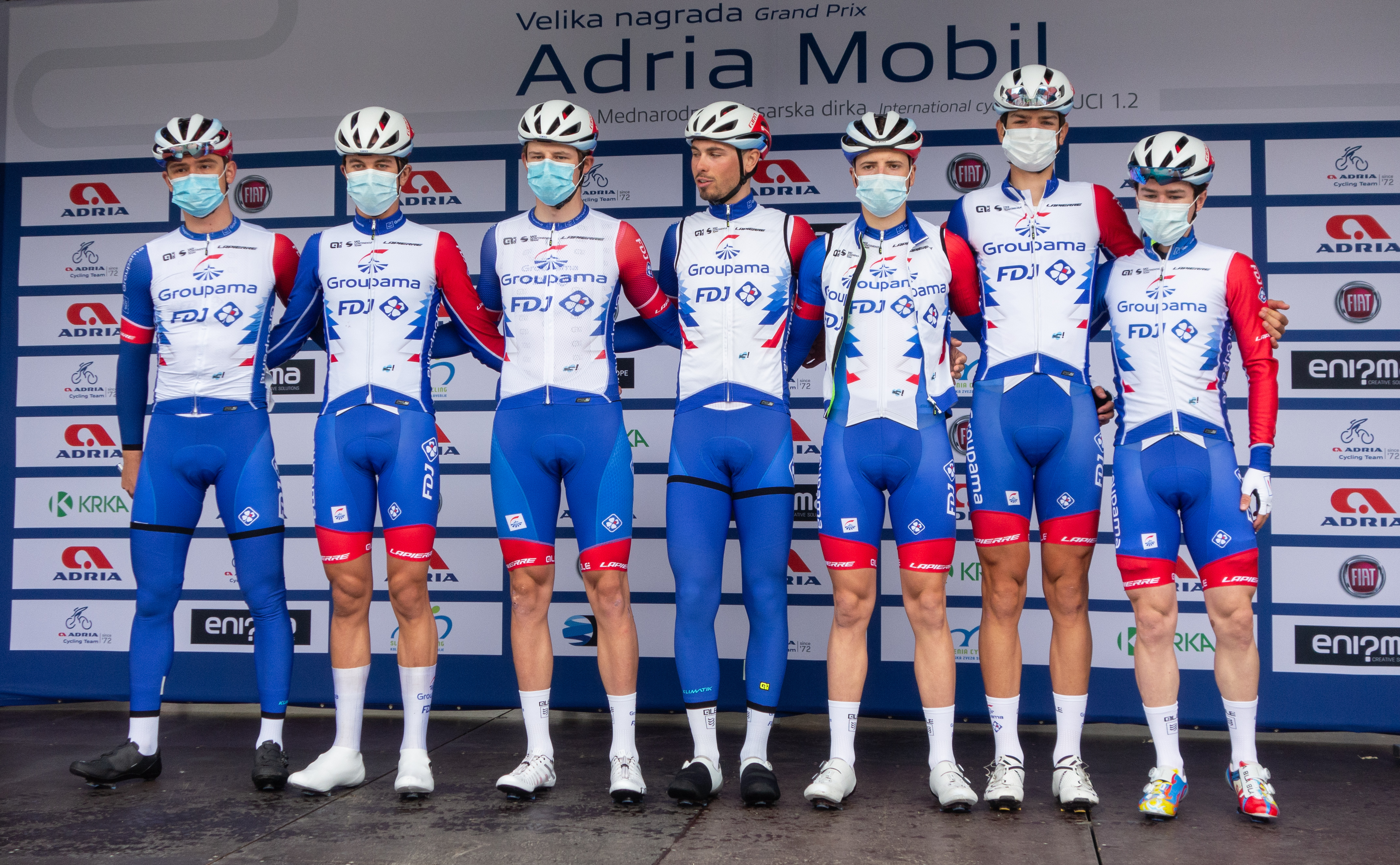

Team information
- UCI code: CGF
- Registered: France
- Founded: 2019
- Status: UCI Continental (2019–)
- Bicycles: Wilier Triestina
- Components: Shimano

Team name history
- 2019–2025 2026–: Groupama–FDJ Continental Team; Groupama–FDJ United Continental Team

Groupama–FDJ United Continental Team is a professional road bicycle racing team which participates in elite races. The team registered with the UCI for the 2019 season.

== Team roster ==
As of 2 July 2025.

Rider	Date of birth
Blake Agnoletto (AUS)	21 October 2002 (age 23)
Max Bock (GER)	10 March 2005 (age 21)
Eliott Boulet (FRA)	7 September 2006 (age 19)
Maximilian Cushway (FRA)	7 June 2004 (age 22)
Rémi Daumas (FRA)	12 March 2006 (age 20)

Rider	Date of birth
Maxime Decomble (FRA)	16 July 2005 (age 21)
Titouan Fontaine (FRA)	20 June 2005 (age 21)
Baptiste Grégoire (FRA)	13 February 2006 (age 20)
Oscar Nilsson-Julien (FRA)	10 January 2002 (age 24)
Reef Roberts (NZL)	20 December 2006 (age 19)

== Major wins ==
2019
Stage 4 Rhône-Alpes Isère Tour, Karl Patrick Lauk
Stage 2 Giro della Valle d'Aosta, Kevin Inkelaar
Paris–Tours Espoirs, Alexys Brunel
2020
Switzerland National Under-23 Time Trial, Alexandre Balmer
2021
GP Adria Mobil, Marijn van den Berg
Overall Tour d'Eure-et-Loir, Paul Penhoët

Stage 3, Paul Penhoët

Stage 1 Alpes Isère Tour, Marijn van den Berg
Estonia National Under-23 Road Race, Rait Ärm
Overall Giro della Valle d'Aosta, Reuben Thompson
Overall Baltic Chain Tour, Laurence Pithie
Stage 2 Ronde de l'Isard, Lewis Askey
2022
Youngster Coast Challenge, Jensen Plowright
Stage 3 Tour de Normandie, Laurence Pithie
Stage 5 Tour de Normandie, Paul Penhoët
Overall Le Triptyque des Monts et Châteaux, Enzo Paleni

Stage 2, Jensen Plowright

Liège–Bastogne–Liège Espoirs, Romain Grégoire
Giro del Belvedere, Romain Grégoire
Gran Premio Palio del Recioto, Romain Grégoire
Flèche Ardennaise, Romain Grégoire
Stage 7 Giro d'Italia Giovani Under 23, Romain Grégoire
Italy National Under-23 Road Race, Lorenzo Germani
Overall Giro della Valle d'Aosta, Lenny Martinez

Stage 2, Lorenzo Germani
Stage 4, Reuben Thompson

Grand Prix de la ville de Pérenchies, Laurence Pithie
Overall Tour Alsace, Finlay Pickering

Stage 3, Finlay Pickering
Stage 5, Samuel Watson

France National Under-23 Time Trial, Eddy Le Huitouze
Stage 3b Flanders Tomorrow Tour, Jensen Plowright
Grand Prix de la Somme, Rait Ärm
Stages 4 & 6 Ronde de l'Isard, Lenny Martinez
2023
Stage 3 Circuit des Ardennes, Thibaud Gruel
Stages 2 & 5 Giro della Valle d'Aosta, Joshua Golliker
France National Under-23 Time Trial, Eddy Le Huitouze
2024
Stage 2 Circuit des Ardennes, Thibaud Gruel
France National Under-23 Time Trial, Maxime Decomble
Stages 1 & 3 Alpes Isère Tour, Noah Hobbs
Stage 1 Ronde de l'Oise, Lewis Bower
Stage 3 Giro della Valle d'Aosta, Joshua Golliker
Stage 5 Tour Alsace, Noah Hobbs
Stages 3 & 5 Tour of Romania, Lewis Bower
Il Piccolo Lombardia, Brieuc Rolland
2025
Boucle de l'Artois, Lewis Bower
Stage 3 Tour de Bretagne, Eliott Boulet
2026
Youngster Coast Challenge, Eliott Boulet
Classic Annemasse Agglo, Rémi Daumas

== National champions ==
2020
Swiss Under-23 Time Trial, Alexandre Balmer
2021
Estonian Under-23 Road Race, Rait Ärm
2022
Italian Under-23 Road Race, Lorenzo Germani
French Under-23 Time Trial, Eddy Le Huitouze
2023
French Under-23 Time Trial, Eddy Le Huitouze
2024
French Under-23 Time Trial, Maxime Decomble
