= Joppe Heremans =

Belgian cyclist

Personal information
- Born: 20 August 2003 (age 23) Edegem, Belgium
- Height: 1.79 m (5 ft 10 in)
- Weight: 68 kg (150 lb)

Cycling career
- Sport: Cycling
- Current team: Van Rysel–Roubaix
- Discipline: Road
- Role: Rider

Amateur teams
- 2020–2021: Avia–Rudyco–Janatrans Cycling Team
- 2022: VDM–Trawobo Cycling Team
- 2023: EFC–L&R–Van Mossel
- 2024: Urbano–Vulsteke Cycling Team

Professional teams
- 2025: VolkerWessels Cycling Team
- 2026–: Roubaix–Lille Métropole

Joppe Heremans (born 20 August 2003) is a Belgian cyclist, who currently rides for UCI Continental team Van Rysel–Roubaix. He took his first pro win in 2026 on stage four of the Étoile de Bessèges.

== Major results ==
2024
1st Grote Prijs John Hannes
2025
3rd Road race, National Under-23 Championships
3rd Overall Flèche du Sud

1st Young rider classification
1st Stage 5

3rd Overall Course Cycliste de Solidarnosc et des Champions Olympiques

1st Stage 2

2026 (1 pro win)
1st Stage 4 Étoile de Bessèges
