= Ewen Costiou =

French cyclist (born 2002)

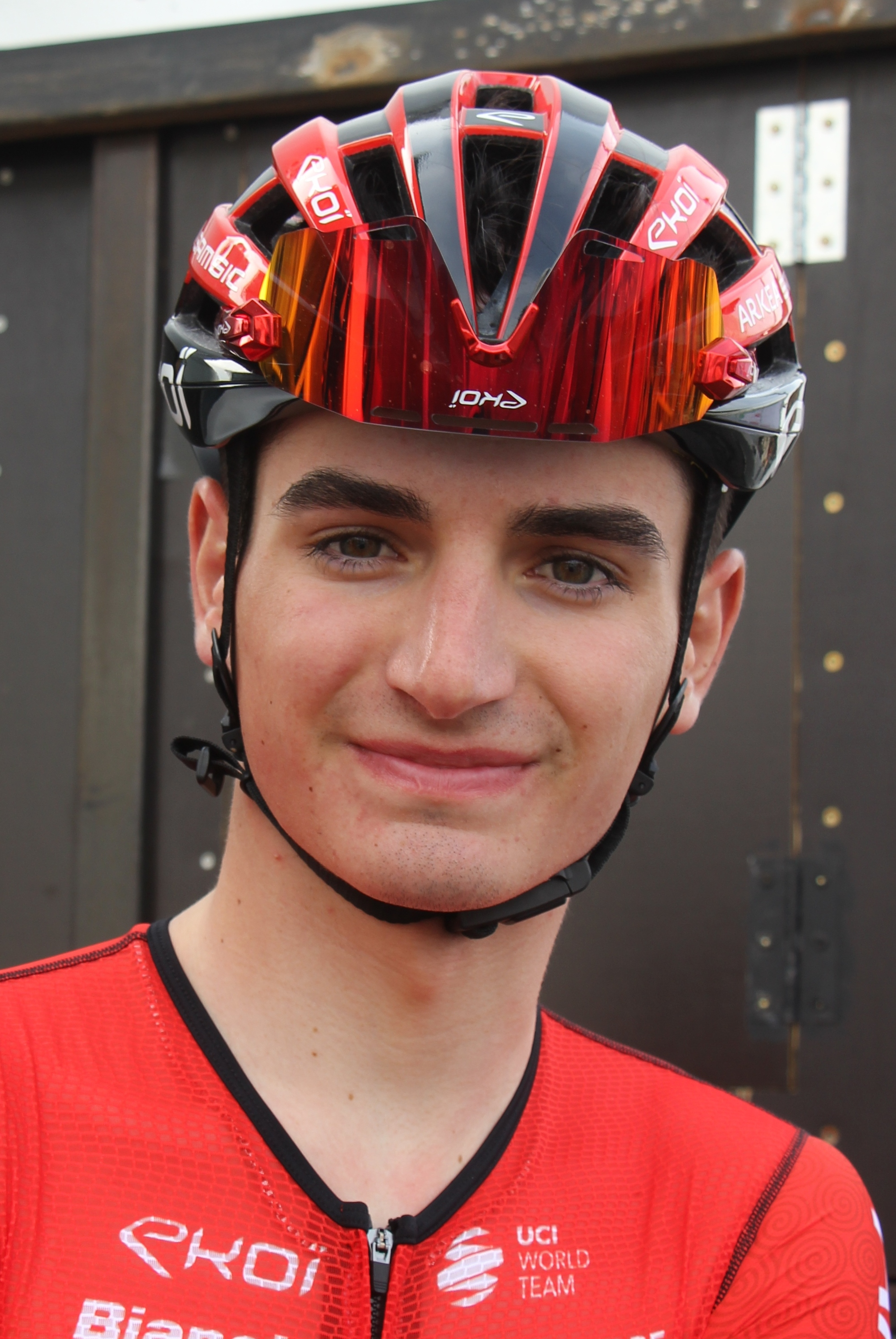
- Ewen Costiou (2023)

Personal information
- Born: 10 November 2002 (age 23) Brest, France

Cycling career
- Sport: Cycling
- Current team: Arkéa–B&B Hotels
- Discipline: Road
- Role: Rider

Amateur teams
- 2017–2020: EC Landerneau
- 2020: Club Bretagne Juniors
- 2021–2022: Côtes d'Armor–Marie Morin

Professional teams
- 2022: Arkéa–Samsic (stagiaire)
- 2023-2025: Arkéa–Samsic
- 2026–: Groupama–FDJ United
Medal record
Men's road cycling
Representing France
Mediterranean Games
Silver medal – second place	2022 Oran	Road race

Ewen Costiou (born 10 November 2002) is a French racing cyclist, who currently rides for UCI WorldTeam Groupama–FDJ United.

== Major results ==
2021
4th Time trial, National Under-23 Road Championships
2022
1st Stage 6 Tour de Bretagne
2nd Overall Tour du Pays de Montbéliard

1st Young rider classification

2nd Road race, Mediterranean Games
2023
2nd Paris–Camembert
8th Classic Grand Besançon Doubs
9th Grand Prix de Wallonie
2024 (1 pro win)
2nd Overall Région Pays de la Loire Tour

1st Young rider classification
1st Stage 2

7th Paris–Camembert
7th Classic Grand Besançon Doubs
9th Overall Tour of Guangxi
2025 (1)
1st Overall Tour du Limousin

1st Young rider classification

4th Paris–Camembert
5th Overall Région Pays de la Loire Tour
5th Time trial, National Road Championships
Combativity award Stage 7 Tour de France
2026 (4)
1st Overall Tour du Limousin

1st Young rider classification
1st Stage 2

1st Overall Étoile de Bessèges

1st Stage 5 (ITT)

3rd Time trial, National Road Championships
6th Tour des Alpes-Maritimes
9th Amstel Gold Race

=== Grand Tour general classification results timeline ===
Grand Tour	2024	2025	2026
Giro d'Italia	90	–	–
Tour de France	–	51	79
Vuelta a España	–	–	–

Legend
—	Did not compete
DNF	Did not finish
