= 2024 Tour of Norway =

Norwegian cycling race

2024 UCI ProSeries

Race details
- Dates: 23–26 May 2024
- Stages: 4
- Distance: 645 km (401 mi)

Results
Jersey awarded to the overall winner	Winner	Axel Laurance (FRA)	(Alpecin–Deceuninck)
	Second	Bart Lemmen (NED)	(Visma–Lease a Bike)
	Third	Ådne Holter (NOR)	(Uno-X Mobility)
Jersey awarded to the mountains classification winner	Mountains	Eirik Vang Aas (NOR)	(Norway)
Jersey awarded to the young rider classification winner	Young rider	Mathias Vacek (CZE)	(Lidl–Trek)
	Team	(Norway) Uno-X Mobility	

The 2024 Tour of Norway was a road cycling stage race that took place between 23 and 26 May 2024 in Norway. The race was rated as a category 2.Pro event on the 2024 UCI ProSeries calendar, and was the 13th edition of the Tour of Norway.

== Teams ==
Seven UCI WorldTeams, six UCI ProTeams, three UCI Continental teams, and the Norwegian national team made up the 17 teams that participated in the race.

UCI WorldTeams

- Alpecin–Deceuninck
- Bora–Hansgrohe
- INEOS Grenadiers
- Intermarché–Wanty
- Lidl–Trek
- Team dsm–firmenich PostNL
- Visma–Lease a Bike

UCI ProTeams

- Bingoal WB
- Q36.5 Pro Cycling Team
- TDT–Unibet Cycling Team
- Team Flanders–Baloise
- Tudor Pro Cycling Team
- Uno-X Mobility

UCI Continental Teams

- ATT Investments
- Project Echelon Racing
- Team Coop–Repsol

National Teams

- Norway

== Route ==
Stage characteristics and winners
Stage	Date	Course	Distance	Type	Stage winner
1	23 May	Vossavangen to Voss Resort	142 km (88 mi)	Hilly stage	Thibau Nys (BEL)
2	24 May	Odda to Gullingen	205 km (127 mi)	Intermediate stage	Axel Laurance (FRA)
3	25 May	Sola to Egersund	173 km (107 mi)	Hilly stage	Jordi Meeus (BEL)
4	26 May	Stavanger to Stavanger	125 km (78 mi)	Hilly stage	Alexander Kristoff (NOR)
Total			645 km (401 mi)		

== Stages ==
=== Stage 1 ===
23 May 2024 – Vossavangen to Voss Resort, 142 km (88 mi)

Stage 1 Result
Rank	Rider	Team	Time
1	Thibau Nys (BEL)	Lidl–Trek	3h 21' 34"
2	Ådne Holter (NOR)	Uno-X Mobility	+ 4"
3	Axel Laurance (FRA)	Alpecin–Deceuninck	+ 4"
4	Bart Lemmen (NED)	Visma–Lease a Bike	+ 6"
5	Mathias Vacek (CZE)	Lidl–Trek	+ 8"
6	Idar Andersen (NOR)	Uno-X Mobility	+ 8"
7	Marco Brenner (GER)	Tudor Pro Cycling Team	+ 18"
8	Adrien Maire (FRA)	TDT–Unibet Cycling Team	+ 18"
9	Óscar Rodríguez (ESP)	INEOS Grenadiers	+ 20"
10	Magnus Cort (DEN)	Uno-X Mobility	+ 20"

General classification after Stage 1
Rank	Rider	Team	Time
1	Thibau Nys (BEL)	Lidl–Trek	3h 21' 24"
2	Ådne Holter (NOR)	Uno-X Mobility	+ 8"
3	Axel Laurance (FRA)	Alpecin–Deceuninck	+ 10"
4	Bart Lemmen (NED)	Visma–Lease a Bike	+ 16"
5	Mathias Vacek (CZE)	Lidl–Trek	+ 16"
6	Idar Andersen (NOR)	Uno-X Mobility	+ 18"
7	Marco Brenner (GER)	Tudor Pro Cycling Team	+ 28"
8	Adrien Maire (FRA)	TDT–Unibet Cycling Team	+ 28"
9	Óscar Rodríguez (ESP)	INEOS Grenadiers	+ 30"
10	Magnus Cort (DEN)	Uno-X Mobility	+ 30"

=== Stage 2 ===
24 May 2024 – Odda to Gullingen, 205 km (127 mi)

Stage 2 Result
Rank	Rider	Team	Time
1	Axel Laurance (FRA)	Alpecin–Deceuninck	5h 01' 09"
2	Ethan Hayter (GBR)	INEOS Grenadiers	+ 0"
3	Bart Lemmen (NED)	Visma–Lease a Bike	+ 0"
4	Mathias Vacek (CZE)	Lidl–Trek	+ 3"
5	Marco Brenner (GER)	Tudor Pro Cycling Team	+ 5"
6	Ådne Holter (NOR)	Uno-X Mobility	+ 5"
7	Kamiel Bonneu (BEL)	Team Flanders–Baloise	+ 5"
8	Carl Fredrik Hagen (NOR)	Q36.5 Pro Cycling Team	+ 5"
9	Óscar Rodríguez (ESP)	INEOS Grenadiers	+ 5"
10	Luca Vergallito (ITA)	Alpecin–Deceuninck	+ 15"

General classification after Stage 2
Rank	Rider	Team	Time
1	Axel Laurance (FRA)	Alpecin–Deceuninck	8h 22' 23"
2	Bart Lemmen (NED)	Visma–Lease a Bike	+ 12"
3	Ådne Holter (NOR)	Uno-X Mobility	+ 13"
4	Mathias Vacek (CZE)	Lidl–Trek	+ 21"
5	Thibau Nys (BEL)	Lidl–Trek	+ 25"
6	Marco Brenner (GER)	Tudor Pro Cycling Team	+ 33"
7	Óscar Rodríguez (ESP)	INEOS Grenadiers	+ 35"
8	Ethan Hayter (GBR)	INEOS Grenadiers	+ 46"
9	Kamiel Bonneu (BEL)	Team Flanders–Baloise	+ 48"
10	Magnus Cort (DEN)	Uno-X Mobility	+ 52"

=== Stage 3 ===
25 May 2024 – Sola to Egersund, 173 km (107 mi)

Stage 3 Result
Rank	Rider	Team	Time
1	Jordi Meeus (BEL)	Bora–Hansgrohe	3h 53' 33"
2	Pavel Bittner (CZE)	Team dsm–firmenich PostNL	+ 0"
3	Alexander Kristoff (NOR)	Uno-X Mobility	+ 0"
4	Wout van Aert (BEL)	Visma–Lease a Bike	+ 0"
5	Elia Viviani (ITA)	INEOS Grenadiers	+ 0"
6	Sasha Weemaes (BEL)	Bingoal WB	+ 0"
7	Huub Artz (NED)	Intermarché–Wanty	+ 0"
8	Mathias Vacek (CZE)	Lidl–Trek	+ 0"
9	Luc Wirtgen (LUX)	Tudor Pro Cycling Team	+ 0"
10	Halvor Utengen Sandstad (NOR)	Team Coop–Repsol	+ 0"

General classification after Stage 3
Rank	Rider	Team	Time
1	Axel Laurance (FRA)	Alpecin–Deceuninck	12h 16' 06"
2	Bart Lemmen (NED)	Visma–Lease a Bike	+ 12"
3	Ådne Holter (NOR)	Uno-X Mobility	+ 13"
4	Mathias Vacek (CZE)	Lidl–Trek	+ 21"
5	Thibau Nys (BEL)	Lidl–Trek	+ 25"
6	Marco Brenner (GER)	Tudor Pro Cycling Team	+ 33"
7	Óscar Rodríguez (ESP)	INEOS Grenadiers	+ 35"
8	Ethan Hayter (GBR)	INEOS Grenadiers	+ 46"
9	Kamiel Bonneu (BEL)	Team Flanders–Baloise	+ 48"
10	Magnus Cort (DEN)	Uno-X Mobility	+ 52"

=== Stage 4 ===
26 May 2024 – Stavanger to Stavanger, 125 km (78 mi)

Stage 4 Result
Rank	Rider	Team	Time
1	Alexander Kristoff (NOR)	Uno-X Mobility	2h 39' 04"
2	Jordi Meeus (BEL)	Bora–Hansgrohe	+ 0"
3	Wout van Aert (BEL)	Visma–Lease a Bike	+ 0"
4	Pavel Bittner (CZE)	Team dsm–firmenich PostNL	+ 0"
5	Lars Craps (BEL)	Team Flanders–Baloise	+ 0"
6	Axel Laurance (FRA)	Alpecin–Deceuninck	+ 0"
7	Marco Brenner (GER)	Tudor Pro Cycling Team	+ 0"
8	Tyler Stites (USA)	Project Echelon Racing	+ 0"
9	Huub Artz (NED)	Intermarché–Wanty	+ 0"
10	Gijs van Hoecke (BEL)	Intermarché–Wanty	+ 0"

General classification after Stage 4
Rank	Rider	Team	Time
1	Axel Laurance (FRA)	Alpecin–Deceuninck	14h 55' 10"
2	Bart Lemmen (NED)	Visma–Lease a Bike	+ 12"
3	Ådne Holter (NOR)	Uno-X Mobility	+ 13"
4	Mathias Vacek (CZE)	Lidl–Trek	+ 21"
5	Marco Brenner (GER)	Tudor Pro Cycling Team	+ 33"
6	Óscar Rodríguez (ESP)	INEOS Grenadiers	+ 35"
7	Ethan Hayter (GBR)	INEOS Grenadiers	+ 46"
8	Magnus Cort (DEN)	Uno-X Mobility	+ 52"
9	Kamiel Bonneu (BEL)	Team Flanders–Baloise	+ 53"
10	Carl Fredrik Hagen (NOR)	Q36.5 Pro Cycling Team	+ 54"

== Classification leadership table ==
Classification leadership by stage
Stage	Winner	General classification	Mountains classification	Young rider classification	Team classification
1	Thibau Nys	Thibau Nys	Eirik Vang Aas	Thibau Nys	Uno-X Mobility
2	Axel Laurance	Axel Laurance	Eirik Vang Aas	Mathias Vacek	Uno-X Mobility
3	Jordi Meeus	Axel Laurance	Eirik Vang Aas	Mathias Vacek	Uno-X Mobility
4	Alexander Kristoff	Axel Laurance	Eirik Vang Aas	Mathias Vacek	Uno-X Mobility
Final		Axel Laurance	Eirik Vang Aas	Mathias Vacek	Uno-X Mobility

== Classification standings ==
Legend
Denotes the leader of the general classification	Denotes the leader of the mountains classification
Denotes the leader of the young rider classification	

=== General classification ===
Final general classification (1–10)
Rank	Rider	Team	Time
1	Axel Laurance (FRA)	Alpecin–Deceuninck	14h 55' 10"
2	Bart Lemmen (NED)	Visma–Lease a Bike	+ 12"
3	Ådne Holter (NOR)	Uno-X Mobility	+ 13"
4	Mathias Vacek (CZE)	Lidl–Trek	+ 21"
5	Marco Brenner (GER)	Tudor Pro Cycling Team	+ 33"
6	Óscar Rodríguez (ESP)	INEOS Grenadiers	+ 35"
7	Ethan Hayter (GBR)	INEOS Grenadiers	+ 46"
8	Magnus Cort (DEN)	Uno-X Mobility	+ 52"
9	Kamiel Bonneu (BEL)	Team Flanders–Baloise	+ 53"
10	Carl Fredrik Hagen (NOR)	Q36.5 Pro Cycling Team	+ 54"

=== Mountains classification ===
Final mountains classification (1–10)
Rank	Rider	Team	Points
1	Eirik Vang Aas (NOR)	Norway	22
2	Filip Řeha (CZE)	ATT Investments	18
3	Ådne Holter (NOR)	Uno-X Mobility	14
4	Hannes Wilksch (GER)	Tudor Pro Cycling Team	12
5	Halvor Utengen Sandstad (NOR)	Team Coop–Repsol	12
6	Axel Laurance (FRA)	Alpecin–Deceuninck	11
7	Bart Lemmen (NED)	Visma–Lease a Bike	11
8	Lennert Teugels (BEL)	Bingoal WB	11
9	Marco Brenner (GER)	Tudor Pro Cycling Team	10
10	Mathias Vacek (CZE)	Lidl–Trek	9

=== Young rider classification ===
Final young rider classification (1–10)
Rank	Rider	Team	Time
1	Mathias Vacek (CZE)	Lidl–Trek	14h 55' 31"
2	Marco Brenner (GER)	Tudor Pro Cycling Team	+ 12"
3	Huub Artz (NED)	Intermarché–Wanty	+ 34"
4	Thibau Nys (BEL)	Lidl–Trek	+ 1' 12"
5	Tijmen Graat (NED)	Visma–Lease a Bike	+ 1' 15"
6	Alexander Hajek (AUT)	Bora–Hansgrohe	+ 1' 33"
7	Andrew August (USA)	INEOS Grenadiers	+ 2' 10"
8	Francesco Busatto (ITA)	Intermarché–Wanty	+ 4' 48"
9	Dylan Vandenstorme (BEL)	Team Flanders–Baloise	+ 5' 03"
10	Trym Brennsæter (NOR)	Norway	+ 5' 59"

=== Team classification ===
Final team classification (1–10)
Rank	Team	Time
1	(Norway) Uno-X Mobility	44h 47' 45"
2	(Netherlands) Visma–Lease a Bike	+ 47"
3	(United Kingdom) INEOS Grenadiers	+ 1' 48"
4	(Belgium) Alpecin–Deceuninck	+ 2' 04"
5	(Belgium) Team Flanders–Baloise	+ 2' 55"
6	(Switzerland) Q36.5 Pro Cycling Team	+ 5' 14"
7	(Belgium) Intermarché–Wanty	+ 5' 23"
8	(United States) Lidl–Trek	+ 6' 54"
9	(Switzerland) Tudor Pro Cycling Team	+ 7' 24"
10	(Germany) Bora–Hansgrohe	+ 8' 31"
