= 2023 Czech Tour =

Czech cycling race

2023 UCI Europe Tour

Race details
- Dates: 27–30 July 2023
- Stages: 4
- Distance: 669.6 km (416.1 mi)
- Winning time: 16h 32' 10"

Results
Jersey awarded to the overall winner	Winner	Florian Lipowitz (GER)	(Bora–Hansgrohe)
	Second	Ben Zwiehoff (GER)	(Bora–Hansgrohe)
	Third	Jakub Otruba (CZE)	(ATT Investments)
Jersey awarded to the points classification winner	Points	Florian Lipowitz (GER)	(Bora–Hansgrohe)
Jersey awarded to the mountains classification winner	Mountains	Samuele Zoccarato (ITA)	(Green Project–Bardiani–CSF–Faizanè)
Jersey awarded to the young rider classification winner	Young rider	Tijmen Graat (NED)	(Team Jumbo–Visma)
	Team	Bora–Hansgrohe	

The 2023 Czech Cycling Tour was a road cycling stage race that took place between 27 and 30 July 2023 in Czech Republic. The race was rated as a category 2.1 event on the 2023 UCI Europe Tour calendar, and was the 13th edition of the Czech Cycling Tour.

== Teams ==
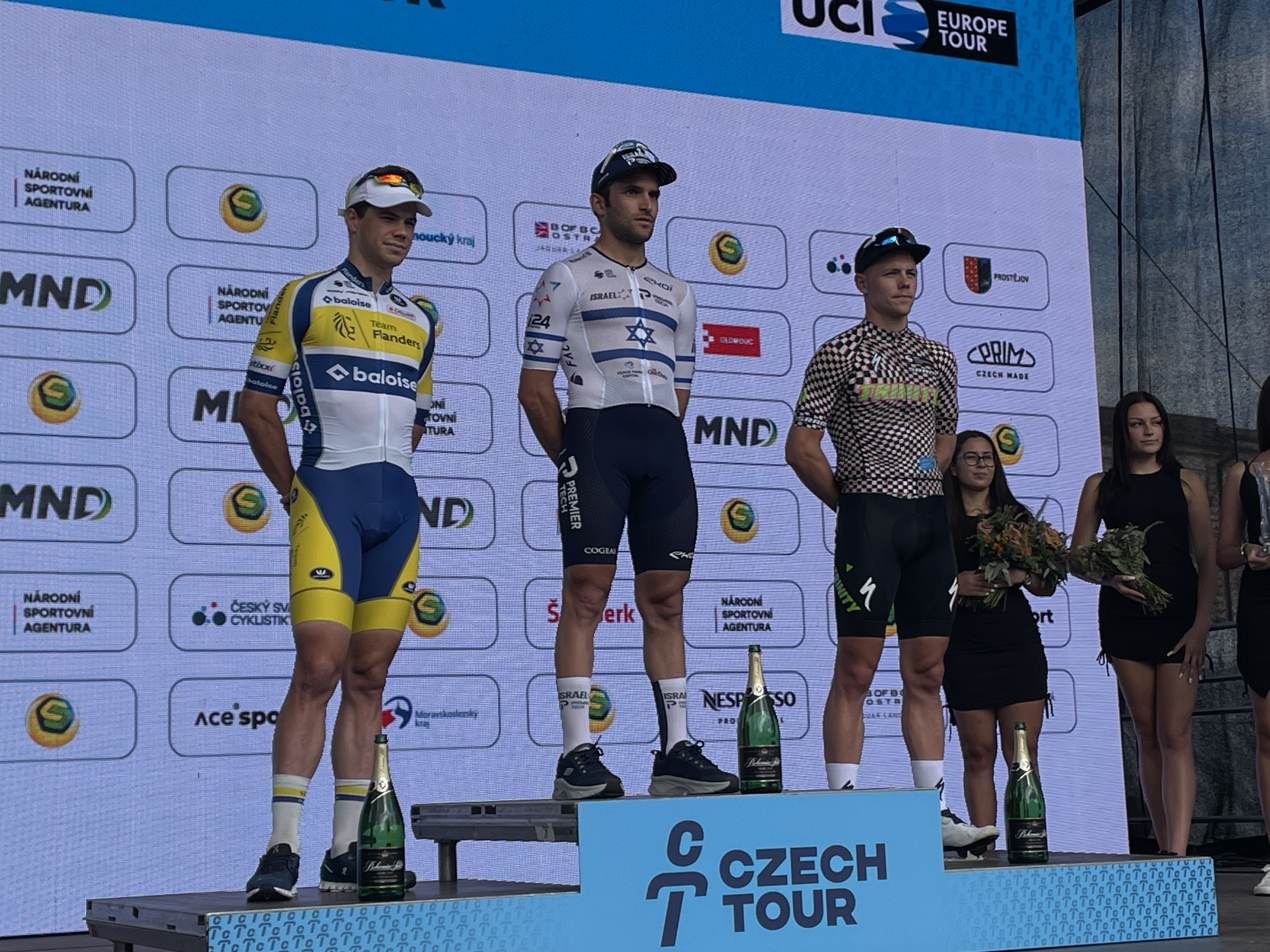
Stage podium after Stage 1, 2023 Czech Tour, Uničov

Three of the 18 UCI WorldTeams, 11 UCI ProTeams, and seven UCI Continental teams made up the 21 teams that participated in the race.

UCI WorldTeams

- Bora–Hansgrohe
- Intermarché–Circus–Wanty
- Team Jumbo–Visma

UCI ProTeams

- Bingoal WB
- Bolton Equities Black Spoke
- Eolo–Kometa
- Equipo Kern Pharma
- Green Project–Bardiani–CSF–Faizanè
- Israel–Premier Tech
- Team Corratec–Selle Italia
- Team Flanders–Baloise
- Team Novo Nordisk
- Tudor Pro Cycling Team
- Uno-X Pro Cycling Team

UCI Continental Teams

- ATT Investments
- EF Education–Nippo Development Team
- Elkov–Kasper
- RRK Group–Pierre Baguette–Benzinol
- Team Felbermayr–Simplon Wels
- Team Lotto–Kern Haus
- Trinity Racing

== Route ==
Stage characteristics and winners
Stage	Date	Course	Distance	Elevation gain	Type	Stage winner
1	27 July	Prostějov to Uničov	165 km (103 mi)	2,217 m (7,274 ft)	Hilly stage	Itamar Einhorn (ISR)
2	28 July	Olomouc to Pustevny	166.9 km (103.7 mi)	2,840 m (9,320 ft)	Intermediate stage	Florian Lipowitz (GER)
3	29 July	Moravská Třebová to Červenohorské sedlo	161.5 km (100.4 mi)	3,404 m (11,168 ft)	Mountain stage	Johannes Staune-Mittet (NOR)
4	30 July	Šumperk to Šternberk	176.5 km (109.7 mi)	2,982 m (9,783 ft)	Intermediate stage	Adam Ťoupalík (CZE)
Total			669.6 km (416.1 mi)	11,443 m (37,543 ft)		

== Stages ==
=== Stage 1 ===
27 July 2023 – Prostějov to Uničov, 165 km (103 mi)

Stage 1 Result (1–10)
Rank	Rider	Team	Time
1	Itamar Einhorn (ISR)	Israel–Premier Tech	3h 48' 15"
2	Milan Fretin (BEL)	Team Flanders–Baloise	+ 0"
3	Luke Lamperti (USA)	Trinity Racing	+ 0"
4	Jonas Koch (GER)	Bora–Hansgrohe	+ 0"
5	Stian Fredheim (NOR)	Uno-X Pro Cycling Team	+ 0"
6	Giovanni Lonardi (ITA)	Eolo–Kometa	+ 0"
7	Tim van Dijke (NED)	Team Jumbo–Visma	+ 0"
8	Taj Jones (AUS)	Israel–Premier Tech	+ 0"
9	Dominik Neuman (CZE)	Elkov–Kasper	+ 0"
10	Karl Patrick Lauk (EST)	Bingoal WB	+ 0"

General classification after Stage 1 (1–10)
Rank	Rider	Team	Time
1	Itamar Einhorn (ISR)	Israel–Premier Tech	3h 48' 05"
2	Milan Fretin (BEL)	Team Flanders–Baloise	+ 4"
3	Luke Lamperti (USA)	Trinity Racing	+ 6"
4	Milan Vader (NED)	Team Jumbo–Visma	+ 7"
5	Anders Halland Johannessen (NOR)	Uno-X Pro Cycling Team	+ 8"
6	Matúš Štoček (SVK)	ATT Investments	+ 9"
7	Jonas Koch (GER)	Bora–Hansgrohe	+ 10"
8	Stian Fredheim (NOR)	Uno-X Pro Cycling Team	+ 10"
9	Giovanni Lonardi (ITA)	Eolo–Kometa	+ 10"
10	Tim van Dijke (NED)	Team Jumbo–Visma	+ 10"

=== Stage 2 ===
28 July 2023 – Olomouc to Pustevny, 166.9 km (103.7 mi)

Stage 2 Result (1–10)
Rank	Rider	Team	Time
1	Florian Lipowitz (GER)	Bora–Hansgrohe	4h 06' 39"
2	Per Strand Hagenes (NOR)	Team Jumbo–Visma	+ 2"
3	Anders Halland Johannessen (NOR)	Uno-X Pro Cycling Team	+ 23"
4	Adam Ťoupalík (CZE)	Elkov–Kasper	+ 25"
5	Ben Zwiehoff (GER)	Bora–Hansgrohe	+ 25"
6	Elias Maris (BEL)	Team Flanders–Baloise	+ 25"
7	Johannes Staune-Mittet (NOR)	Team Jumbo–Visma	+ 25"
8	Jakub Otruba (CZE)	ATT Investments	+ 25"
9	Michel Hessmann (GER)	Team Jumbo–Visma	+ 25"
10	Kamiel Bonneu (BEL)	Team Flanders–Baloise	+ 25"

General classification after Stage 2 (1–10)
Rank	Rider	Team	Time
1	Florian Lipowitz (GER)	Bora–Hansgrohe	7h 54' 44"
2	Per Strand Hagenes (NOR)	Team Jumbo–Visma	+ 6"
3	Anders Halland Johannessen (NOR)	Uno-X Pro Cycling Team	+ 27"
4	Alex Tolio (ITA)	Green Project–Bardiani–CSF–Faizanè	+ 35"
5	Ben Zwiehoff (GER)	Bora–Hansgrohe	+ 35"
6	Floris De Tier (BEL)	Bingoal WB	+ 35"
7	Jakub Otruba (CZE)	ATT Investments	+ 35"
8	Luca Covili (ITA)	Green Project–Bardiani–CSF–Faizanè	+ 35"
9	Mattia Bais (ITA)	Eolo–Kometa	+ 35"
10	Tijmen Graat (NED)	Team Jumbo–Visma	+ 35"

=== Stage 3 ===
29 July 2023 – Moravská Třebová to Červenohorské sedlo, 161.5 km (100.4 mi)

Stage 3 Result (1–10)
Rank	Rider	Team	Time
1	Johannes Staune-Mittet (NOR)	Team Jumbo–Visma	4h 12' 56"
2	Florian Lipowitz (GER)	Bora–Hansgrohe	+ 2"
3	Rein Taaramäe (EST)	Intermarché–Circus–Wanty	+ 10"
4	Samuele Zoccarato (ITA)	Green Project–Bardiani–CSF–Faizanè	+ 44"
5	Lukas Nerurkar (GBR)	Trinity Racing	+ 1' 43"
6	Kamiel Bonneu (BEL)	Team Flanders–Baloise	+ 1' 43"
7	Mason Hollyman (GBR)	Israel–Premier Tech	+ 1' 45"
8	Jakub Otruba (CZE)	ATT Investments	+ 1' 45"
9	Ben Zwiehoff (GER)	Bora–Hansgrohe	+ 1' 45"
10	Tijmen Graat (NED)	Team Jumbo–Visma	+ 1' 51"

General classification after Stage 3 (1–10)
Rank	Rider	Team	Time
1	Florian Lipowitz (GER)	Bora–Hansgrohe	12h 07' 36"
2	Johannes Staune-Mittet (NOR)	Team Jumbo–Visma	+ 29"
3	Kamiel Bonneu (BEL)	Team Flanders–Baloise	+ 2' 22"
4	Ben Zwiehoff (GER)	Bora–Hansgrohe	+ 2' 24"
5	Jakub Otruba (CZE)	ATT Investments	+ 2' 24"
6	Tijmen Graat (NED)	Team Jumbo–Visma	+ 2' 30"
7	Luca Covili (ITA)	Green Project–Bardiani–CSF–Faizanè	+ 2' 39"
8	Mason Hollyman (GBR)	Israel–Premier Tech	+ 3' 02"
9	José Félix Parra (ESP)	Equipo Kern Pharma	+ 3' 16"
10	Michel Hessmann (GER)	Team Jumbo–Visma	+ 3' 26"

=== Stage 4 ===
30 July 2023 – Šumperk to Šternberk, 176.2 km (109.5 mi)

Stage 4 Result (1–10)
Rank	Rider	Team	Time
1	Adam Ťoupalík (CZE)	Elkov–Kasper	4h 24' 32"
2	Ben Zwiehoff (GER)	Bora–Hansgrohe	+ 4"
3	Florian Lipowitz (GER)	Bora–Hansgrohe	+ 6"
4	Jacob Eriksson (SWE)	Tudor Pro Cycling Team	+ 8"
5	Luke Lamperti (USA)	Trinity Racing	+ 16"
6	Francesco Busatto (ITA)	Intermarché–Circus–Wanty	+ 16"
7	Daniel Lima (POR)	Israel–Premier Tech	+ 19"
8	Milan Vader (NED)	Team Jumbo–Visma	+ 22"
9	Jakub Otruba (CZE)	ATT Investments	+ 22"
10	James Oram (NZL)	Bolton Equities Black Spoke	+ 24"

Final general classification (1–10)
Rank	Rider	Team	Time
1	Florian Lipowitz (GER)	Bora–Hansgrohe	16h 32' 10"
2	Ben Zwiehoff (GER)	Bora–Hansgrohe	+ 2' 20"
3	Jakub Otruba (CZE)	ATT Investments	+ 2' 44"
4	Kamiel Bonneu (BEL)	Team Flanders–Baloise	+ 2' 45"
5	Tijmen Graat (NED)	Team Jumbo–Visma	+ 2' 53"
6	Luca Covili (ITA)	Green Project–Bardiani–CSF–Faizanè	+ 3' 02"
7	Mason Hollyman (GBR)	Israel–Premier Tech	+ 3' 25"
8	José Félix Parra (ESP)	Equipo Kern Pharma	+ 4' 02"
9	Lukas Nerurkar (GBR)	Trinity Racing	+ 4' 11"
10	Jon Agirre (ESP)	Equipo Kern Pharma	+ 4' 19"

== Classification leadership table ==
Classification leadership by stage
Stage	Winner	General classification	Points classification	Mountains classification	Young rider classification	Team classification
1	Itamar Einhorn	Itamar Einhorn	Itamar Einhorn	Johannes Staune-Mittet	Milan Fretin	Israel–Premier Tech
2	Florian Lipowitz	Florian Lipowitz	Florian Lipowitz	Matěj Zahálka	Per Strand Hagenes	Team Jumbo–Visma
3	Johannes Staune-Mittet	Florian Lipowitz	Florian Lipowitz	Johannes Staune-Mittet	Johannes Staune-Mittet	Team Jumbo–Visma
4	Adam Ťoupalík	Florian Lipowitz	Florian Lipowitz	Samuele Zoccarato	Tijmen Graat	Bora–Hansgrohe
Final		Florian Lipowitz	Florian Lipowitz	Samuele Zoccarato	Tijmen Graat	Bora–Hansgrohe

== Final classification standings ==
Legend
Denotes the winner of the general classification	Denotes the winner of the mountains classification
Denotes the winner of the points classification	Denotes the winner of the young rider classification

=== General classification ===
Final general classification (1–10)
Rank	Rider	Team	Time
1	Florian Lipowitz (GER)	Bora–Hansgrohe	16h 32' 10"
2	Ben Zwiehoff (GER)	Bora–Hansgrohe	+ 2' 20"
3	Jakub Otruba (CZE)	ATT Investments	+ 2' 44"
4	Kamiel Bonneu (BEL)	Team Flanders–Baloise	+ 2' 45"
5	Tijmen Graat (NED)	Team Jumbo–Visma	+ 2' 53"
6	Luca Covili (ITA)	Green Project–Bardiani–CSF–Faizanè	+ 3' 02"
7	Mason Hollyman (GBR)	Israel–Premier Tech	+ 3' 25"
8	José Félix Parra (ESP)	Equipo Kern Pharma	+ 4' 02"
9	Lukas Nerurkar (GBR)	Trinity Racing	+ 4' 11"
10	Jon Agirre (ESP)	Equipo Kern Pharma	+ 4' 19"

=== Points classification ===
Final general classification (1–10)
Rank	Rider	Team	Points
1	Florian Lipowitz (GER)	Bora–Hansgrohe	61
2	Adam Ťoupalík (CZE)	Elkov–Kasper	39
3	Ben Zwiehoff (GER)	Bora–Hansgrohe	39
4	Luke Lamperti (USA)	Trinity Racing	28
5	Jakub Otruba (CZE)	ATT Investments	23
6	Per Strand Hagenes (NOR)	Team Jumbo–Visma	20
7	Milan Fretin (BEL)	Team Flanders–Baloise	20
8	Milan Vader (NED)	Team Jumbo–Visma	18
9	Stian Fredheim (NOR)	Uno-X Pro Cycling Team	18
10	Kamiel Bonneu (BEL)	Team Flanders–Baloise	16

=== Mountains classification ===
Final general classification (1–10)
Rank	Rider	Team	Points
1	Samuele Zoccarato (ITA)	Green Project–Bardiani–CSF–Faizanè	16
2	Matěj Zahálka (CZE)	Elkov–Kasper	16
3	Michel Hessmann (GER)	Team Jumbo–Visma	14
4	Florian Lipowitz (GER)	Bora–Hansgrohe	10
5	Toby Perry (GBR)	EF Education–Nippo Development Team	10
6	Riccardo Zoidl (AUT)	Team Felbermayr–Simplon Wels	8
7	Stian Fredheim (NOR)	Uno-X Pro Cycling Team	8
8	Fredrik Dversnes (NOR)	Uno-X Pro Cycling Team	6
9	Per Strand Hagenes (NOR)	Team Jumbo–Visma	6
10	Arthur Kluckers (LUX)	Tudor Pro Cycling Team	6

=== Young rider classification ===
Final general classification (1–10)
Rank	Rider	Team	Time
1	Tijmen Graat (NED)	Team Jumbo–Visma	16h 35' 03"
2	Lukas Nerurkar (GBR)	Trinity Racing	+ 1' 18"
3	Francesco Busatto (ITA)	Intermarché–Circus–Wanty	+ 2' 53"
4	Karel Camrda (CZE)	ATT Investments	+ 3' 05"
5	Michel Hessmann (GER)	Team Jumbo–Visma	+ 4' 42"
6	Mathieu Kockelmann (LUX)	Team Lotto–Kern Haus	+ 10' 39"
7	Alessio Nieri (ITA)	Green Project–Bardiani–CSF–Faizanè	+ 10' 42"
8	Daniel Lima (POR)	Israel–Premier Tech	+ 12' 04"
9	Daniel Vysočan (CZE)	RRK Group–Pierre Baguette–Benzinol	+ 12' 11"
10	Tomáš Přidal (CZE)	Elkov–Kasper	+ 14' 38"

=== Teams classification ===
Final general classification (1–10)
Rank	Team	Time
1	Bora–Hansgrohe	49h 44' 33"
2	Team Jumbo–Visma	+ 3' 01"
3	Equipo Kern Pharma	+ 6' 49"
4	Green Project–Bardiani–CSF–Faizanè	+ 7' 48"
5	ATT Investments	+ 17' 25"
6	Elkov–Kasper	+ 17' 31"
7	Israel–Premier Tech	+ 21' 45"
8	Tudor Pro Cycling Team	+ 24' 49"
9	Intermarché–Circus–Wanty	+ 26' 06"
10	Bingoal WB	+ 27' 02"
