= 2024 Arctic Race of Norway =

2024 UCI ProSeries

Race details
- Dates: 4–7 August 2024
- Stages: 4
- Distance: 647.5 km (402.3 mi)
- Winning time: 14h 59' 45"

Results
Jersey awarded to the overall winner	Winner	Magnus Cort (DEN)	(Uno-X Mobility)
	Second	Clément Champoussin (FRA)	(Arkéa–B&B Hotels)
	Third	Kevin Vermaerke (USA)	(Team dsm–firmenich PostNL)
Jersey awarded to the points classification winner	Points	Magnus Cort (DEN)	(Uno-X Mobility)
Jersey awarded to the mountains classification winner	Mountains	Jelle Johannink (NED)	(TDT–Unibet Cycling Team)
Jersey awarded to the youth classification winner	Youth	Kevin Vermaerke (USA)	(Team dsm–firmenich PostNL)
	Team	(Australia) Team Jayco–AlUla	

The 2024 Arctic Race of Norway was a road cycling stage race took place between 4 and 7 August 2024. It was the eleventh edition of the Arctic Race of Norway, which is rated as a 2.Pro event on the 2024 UCI ProSeries calendar.

== Teams ==
Five UCI WorldTeams, twelve UCI ProTeams, and one UCI Continental team made up the eighteen teams that competed in the race.

UCI WorldTeams

- Arkéa–B&B Hotels
- Astana Qazaqstan Team
- Cofidis
- Team dsm–firmenich PostNL
- Team Jayco–AlUla

UCI ProTeams

- Bingoal WB
- Equipo Kern Pharma
- Israel–Premier Tech
- Lotto–Dstny
- Q36.5 Pro Cycling Team
- TDT–Unibet Cycling Team
- Team Flanders–Baloise
- Team Novo Nordisk
- Team TotalEnergies
- Tudor Pro Cycling Team
- Uno-X Mobility
- VF Group–Bardiani–CSF–Faizanè

UCI Continental Teams

- Team Coop–Repsol

== Route ==
Stage characteristics and winners
Stage	Date	Route	Distance	Type	Winner
1	4 August	Bodø to Rognan	155.5 km (96.6 mi)	Flat stage	Alexander Kristoff (NOR)
2	5 August	Beiarn to Fauske	178.5 km (110.9 mi)	Hilly stage	Alexander Kristoff (NOR)
3	6 August	Tverlandet to Jakobsbakken	156 km (97 mi)	Hilly stage	Kamiel Bonneu (BEL)
4	7 August	Glomfjord to Bodø	157.5 km (97.9 mi)	Hilly stage	Magnus Cort (DEN)
Total			647.5 km (402.3 mi)		

== Stages ==
=== Stage 1 ===
4 August — Bodø to Rognan, 155.5 km (96.6 mi)

Stage 1 Result (1–10)
Rank	Rider	Team	Time
1	Alexander Kristoff (NOR)	Uno-X Mobility	3h 43' 32"
2	Milan Fretin (BEL)	Cofidis	+ 0"
3	Tom van Asbroeck (BEL)	Israel–Premier Tech	+ 0"
4	Emilien Jeannière (FRA)	Team TotalEnergies	+ 0"
5	Jenthe Biermans (BEL)	Arkéa–B&B Hotels	+ 0"
6	Max Kanter (GER)	Astana Qazaqstan Team	+ 0"
7	Magnus Cort (DEN)	Uno-X Mobility	+ 0"
8	Fabio Christen (SUI)	Q36.5 Pro Cycling Team	+ 0"
9	Gilles De Wilde (BEL)	Team Flanders–Baloise	+ 0"
10	Matyáš Kopecký (CZE)	Team Novo Nordisk	+ 0"

General classification after Stage 1 (1–10)
Rank	Rider	Team	Time
1	Alexander Kristoff (NOR)	Uno-X Mobility	3h 43' 22"
2	Milan Fretin (BEL)	Cofidis	+ 4"
3	Pascal Eenkhoorn (NED)	Lotto–Dstny	+ 4"
4	Tom van Asbroeck (BEL)	Israel–Premier Tech	+ 6"
5	Mikel Retegi (ESP)	Equipo Kern Pharma	+ 6"
6	Magnus Cort (DEN)	Uno-X Mobility	+ 7"
7	Mauro Schmid (SUI)	Team Jayco–AlUla	+ 8"
8	Kevin Vermaerke (USA)	Team dsm–firmenich PostNL	+ 9"
9	Emilien Jeannière (FRA)	Team TotalEnergies	+ 10"
10	Jenthe Biermans (BEL)	Arkéa–B&B Hotels	+ 10"

=== Stage 2 ===
5 August — Beiarn to Fauske, 178.5 km (110.9 mi)

Stage 2 Result (1–10)
Rank	Rider	Team	Time
1	Alexander Kristoff (NOR)	Uno-X Mobility	4h 05' 38"
2	Tom van Asbroeck (BEL)	Israel–Premier Tech	+ 0"
3	Magnus Cort (DEN)	Uno-X Mobility	+ 0"
4	Emilien Jeannière (FRA)	Team TotalEnergies	+ 0"
5	Max Kanter (GER)	Astana Qazaqstan Team	+ 0"
6	Lionel Taminiaux (BEL)	Lotto–Dstny	+ 0"
7	Fabio Christen (SUI)	Q36.5 Pro Cycling Team	+ 0"
8	Louis Blouwe (BEL)	Bingoal WB	+ 0"
9	Davide De Pretto (ITA)	Team Jayco–AlUla	+ 0"
10	Francisco Galván (ESP)	Equipo Kern Pharma	+ 0"

General classification after Stage 2 (1–10)
Rank	Rider	Team	Time
1	Alexander Kristoff (NOR)	Uno-X Mobility	7h 48' 50"
2	Tom van Asbroeck (BEL)	Israel–Premier Tech	+ 10"
3	Magnus Cort (DEN)	Uno-X Mobility	+ 13"
4	Pascal Eenkhoorn (NED)	Lotto–Dstny	+ 14"
5	Mauro Schmid (SUI)	Team Jayco–AlUla	+ 15"
6	Mikel Retegi (ESP)	Equipo Kern Pharma	+ 16"
7	Kevin Vermaerke (USA)	Team dsm–firmenich PostNL	+ 18"
8	Mathieu Burgaudeau (FRA)	Team TotalEnergies	+ 18"
9	Emilien Jeannière (FRA)	Team TotalEnergies	+ 20"
10	Max Kanter (GER)	Astana Qazaqstan Team	+ 20"

=== Stage 3 ===
6 August — Tverlandet to Jakobsbakken, 156 km (97 mi)

Stage 3 Result (1–10)
Rank	Rider	Team	Time
1	Kamiel Bonneu (BEL)	Team Flanders–Baloise	3h 51' 55"
2	Magnus Cort (DEN)	Uno-X Mobility	+ 2"
3	Kevin Vermaerke (USA)	Team dsm–firmenich PostNL	+ 2"
4	Joseph Blackmore (GBR)	Israel–Premier Tech	+ 2"
5	Clément Champoussin (FRA)	Arkéa–B&B Hotels	+ 2"
6	Nick Schultz (AUS)	Israel–Premier Tech	+ 2"
7	Lars Craps (BEL)	Team Flanders–Baloise	+ 2"
8	Mauro Schmid (SUI)	Team Jayco–AlUla	+ 2"
9	Unai Iribar (ESP)	Equipo Kern Pharma	+ 2"
10	Fabio Christen (SUI)	Q36.5 Pro Cycling Team	+ 2"

General classification after Stage 3 (1–10)
Rank	Rider	Team	Time
1	Magnus Cort (DEN)	Uno-X Mobility	11h 40' 54"
2	Kamiel Bonneu (BEL)	Team Flanders–Baloise	+ 1"
3	Kevin Vermaerke (USA)	Team dsm–firmenich PostNL	+ 7"
4	Mauro Schmid (SUI)	Team Jayco–AlUla	+ 8"
5	Fabio Christen (SUI)	Q36.5 Pro Cycling Team	+ 13"
6	Lander Loockx (BEL)	TDT–Unibet Cycling Team	+ 13"
7	Clément Champoussin (FRA)	Arkéa–B&B Hotels	+ 13"
8	Joseph Blackmore (GBR)	Israel–Premier Tech	+ 13"
9	Floris De Tier (BEL)	Bingoal WB	+ 13"
10	Lars Craps (BEL)	Team Flanders–Baloise	+ 13"

=== Stage 4 ===
7 August — Glomfjord to Bodø, 157.5 km (97.9 mi)

Stage 4 Result (1–10)
Rank	Rider	Team	Time
1	Magnus Cort (DEN)	Uno-X Mobility	3h 19' 01"
2	Clément Champoussin (FRA)	Arkéa–B&B Hotels	+ 0"
3	Fabio Christen (SUI)	Q36.5 Pro Cycling Team	+ 2"
4	Jenno Berckmoes (BEL)	Lotto–Dstny	+ 2"
5	Mauro Schmid (SUI)	Team Jayco–AlUla	+ 2"
6	Kevin Vermaerke (USA)	Team dsm–firmenich PostNL	+ 2"
7	Mathieu Burgaudeau (FRA)	Team TotalEnergies	+ 8"
8	Gianluca Brambilla (ITA)	Q36.5 Pro Cycling Team	+ 8"
9	Floris De Tier (BEL)	Bingoal WB	+ 8"
10	Christian Scaroni (ITA)	Astana Qazaqstan Team	+ 8"

General classification after Stage 4 (1–10)
Rank	Rider	Team	Time
1	Magnus Cort (DEN)	Uno-X Mobility	14h 59' 45"
2	Clément Champoussin (FRA)	Arkéa–B&B Hotels	+ 17"
3	Kevin Vermaerke (USA)	Team dsm–firmenich PostNL	+ 19"
4	Mauro Schmid (SUI)	Team Jayco–AlUla	+ 20"
5	Fabio Christen (SUI)	Q36.5 Pro Cycling Team	+ 21"
6	Kamiel Bonneu (BEL)	Team Flanders–Baloise	+ 22"
7	Jenno Berckmoes (BEL)	Lotto–Dstny	+ 30"
8	Lander Loockx (BEL)	TDT–Unibet Cycling Team	+ 31"
9	Floris De Tier (BEL)	Bingoal WB	+ 31"
10	Joseph Blackmore (GBR)	Israel–Premier Tech	+ 34"

== Classification leadership table ==
Classification leadership by stage
Stage	Winner	General classification	Points classification	Mountains classification	Young rider classification	Team classification	Combativity award
1	Alexander Kristoff	Alexander Kristoff	Alexander Kristoff	Jelle Johannink	Milan Fretin	Uno-X Mobility	Eivind Fougner
2	Alexander Kristoff	Alexander Kristoff	Alexander Kristoff	Jelle Johannink	Mauro Schmid	Uno-X Mobility	Simon Pellaud
3	Kamiel Bonneu	Magnus Cort	Alexander Kristoff	Jelle Johannink	Kamiel Bonneu	Israel–Premier Tech	
4	Magnus Cort	Magnus Cort	Magnus Cort	Jelle Johannink	Kevin Vermaerke	Team Jayco–AlUla	Jonas Wilsly
Final		Magnus Cort	Magnus Cort	Jelle Johannink	Kevin Vermaerke	Team Jayco–AlUla	Not awarded

== Classification standings ==
Legend
Denotes the winner of the general classification	Denotes the winner of the points classification
Denotes the winner of the mountains classification	Denotes the winner of the young rider classification

=== General classification ===
Final general classification (1–10)
Rank	Rider	Team	Time
1	Magnus Cort (DEN)	Uno-X Mobility	14h 59' 45"
2	Clément Champoussin (FRA)	Arkéa–B&B Hotels	+ 17"
3	Kevin Vermaerke (USA)	Team dsm–firmenich PostNL	+ 19"
4	Mauro Schmid (SUI)	Team Jayco–AlUla	+ 20"
5	Fabio Christen (SUI)	Q36.5 Pro Cycling Team	+ 21"
6	Kamiel Bonneu (BEL)	Team Flanders–Baloise	+ 22"
7	Jenno Berckmoes (BEL)	Lotto–Dstny	+ 30"
8	Lander Loockx (BEL)	TDT–Unibet Cycling Team	+ 31"
9	Floris De Tier (BEL)	Bingoal WB	+ 31"
10	Joseph Blackmore (GBR)	Israel–Premier Tech	+ 34"

=== Points classification ===
Final points classification (1–10)
Rank	Rider	Team	Points
1	Magnus Cort (DEN)	Uno-X Mobility	43
2	Alexander Kristoff (NOR)	Uno-X Mobility	30
3	Tom Van Asbroeck (BEL)	Israel–Premier Tech	21
4	Clément Champoussin (FRA)	Arkéa–B&B Hotels	18
5	Fabio Christen (SUI)	Q36.5 Pro Cycling Team	17
6	Kevin Vermaerke (USA)	Team dsm–firmenich PostNL	16
7	Kamiel Bonneu (BEL)	Team Flanders–Baloise	15
8	Mauro Schmid (SUI)	Team Jayco–AlUla	14
9	Emilien Jeannière (FRA)	Team TotalEnergies	14
10	Max Kanter (GER)	Astana Qazaqstan Team	11

=== Mountains classification ===
Final mountains classification (1–10)
Rank	Rider	Team	Points
1	Jelle Johannink (NED)	TDT–Unibet Cycling Team	40
2	Magnus Cort (DEN)	Uno-X Mobility	20
3	Kamiel Bonneu (BEL)	Team Flanders–Baloise	16
4	Simon Pellaud (SUI)	Tudor Pro Cycling Team	13
5	Logan Currie (NZL)	Lotto–Dstny	9
6	Kalle Kvam (NOR)	Team Coop–Repsol	7
7	Clément Champoussin (FRA)	Arkéa–B&B Hotels	6
8	Kevin Vermaerke (USA)	Team dsm–firmenich PostNL	6
9	Alessandro Perracchione (ITA)	Team Novo Nordisk	5
10	Gilles De Wilde (BEL)	Team Flanders–Baloise	5

=== Young rider classification ===
Final young rider classification (1–10)
Rank	Rider	Team	Time
1	Kevin Vermaerke (USA)	Team dsm–firmenich PostNL	15h 00' 04"
2	Mauro Schmid (SUI)	Team Jayco–AlUla	+ 1"
3	Fabio Christen (SUI)	Q36.5 Pro Cycling Team	+ 2"
4	Kamiel Bonneu (BEL)	Team Flanders–Baloise	+ 3"
5	Jenno Berckmoes (BEL)	Lotto–Dstny	+ 11"
6	Joseph Blackmore (GBR)	Israel–Premier Tech	+ 15"
7	Lars Craps (BEL)	Team Flanders–Baloise	+ 20"
8	Anders Foldager (DEN)	Team Jayco–AlUla	+ 23"
9	Harrison Wood (GBR)	Cofidis	+ 26"
10	Mikel Retegi (ESP)	Equipo Kern Pharma	+ 47"

=== Team classification ===
Final team classification (1–10)
Rank	Team	Time
1	(Australia) Team Jayco–AlUla	45h 01' 17"
2	(France) Cofidis	+ 19"
3	Israel–Premier Tech	+ 57"
4	(Switzerland) Q36.5 Pro Cycling Team	+ 1' 34"
5	(Belgium) Lotto–Dstny	+ 1' 57"
6	(Norway) Uno-X Mobility	+ 2' 28"
7	(Switzerland) Tudor Pro Cycling Team	+ 2' 43"
8	(France) Arkéa–B&B Hotels	+ 2' 44"
9	(Spain) Equipo Kern Pharma	+ 2' 59"
10	(Italy) VF Group–Bardiani–CSF–Faizanè	+ 3' 09"
