= 2024 Czech Tour =

Czech cycling race

2024 UCI Europe Tour

Race details
- Dates: 25–28 July 2024
- Stages: 4
- Distance: 587.9 km (365.3 mi)
- Winning time: 14h 13' 22"

Results
Jersey awarded to the overall winner	Winner	Marc Hirschi (SUI)	(UAE Team Emirates)
	Second	Diego Ulissi (ITA)	(UAE Team Emirates)
	Third	Sergio Higuita (COL)	(Bora–Hansgrohe)
Jersey awarded to the points classification winner	Points	Marc Hirschi (SUI)	(UAE Team Emirates)
Jersey awarded to the mountains classification winner	Mountains	Michal Schuran (CZE)	(ATT Investments)
Jersey awarded to the young rider classification winner	Young rider	Marco Brenner (GER)	(Tudor Pro Cycling Team)

The 2024 Czech Tour was a road cycling stage race between 25 and 28 July 2024 in the Czech Republic. The race was rated as a category 2.1 event on the 2024 UCI Europe Tour calendar, and was the 15th edition of the Czech Tour. The route spanned nearly 600 kilometers between four stages, and concluded at the event's traditional finish line in the cobbled historic district of Šternberk.

== Teams ==
Eight UCI WorldTeams, eight UCI ProTeams, and six UCI Continental teams participated in the race. In 2024, the Czech Tour featured the largest number UCI WorldTeams in the event's history. 148 riders began the race in Prostějov, 120 of whom completed all four stages.

UCI WorldTeams

- Bora–Hansgrohe
- INEOS Grenadiers
- Intermarché–Wanty
- Soudal–Quick-Step
- Team Bahrain Victorious
- Team dsm–firmenich PostNL
- Visma–Lease a Bike
- UAE Team Emirates

UCI ProTeams

- Bingoal WB
- Polti–Kometa
- Q36.5 Pro Cycling Team
- TDT–Unibet Cycling Team
- Team Corratec–Vini Fantini
- Team Flanders–Baloise
- Tudor Pro Cycling Team
- Uno-X Mobility

UCI Continental Teams

- ATT Investments
- CCACHE x Par Küp
- Elkov–Kasper
- Israel Premier Tech Academy
- Lidl–Trek Future Racing
- Pierre Baguette Cycling

== Route ==
Stage characteristics and winners
Stage	Date	Course	Distance	Elevation gain	Type	Stage winner
1	25 July	Prostějov to Ostrava	151.2 km (94.0 mi)	1,418 m (4,652 ft)	Hilly stage	Luke Lamperti (USA)
2	28 July	Zlín to Pustevny	172.7 km (107.3 mi)	3,389 m (11,119 ft)	Mountain stage	Marc Hirschi (SUI)
3	29 July	Moravská Třebová to Dlouhé stráně	134 km (83 mi)	2,404 m (7,887 ft)	Mountain stage	Thomas Gloag (GBR)
4	30 July	Šumperk to Šternberk	129.2 km (80.3 mi)	1,945 m (6,381 ft)	Hilly stage	Julian Alaphilippe (FRA)
Total			587.1 km (364.8 mi)	9,156 m (30,039 ft)		

== Stages ==
=== Stage 1 ===
25 July 2024 – Prostějov to Ostrava, 151.2 km (94.0 mi)

Stage 1 Result (1–10)
Rank	Rider	Team	Time
1	Luke Lamperti (USA)	Soudal–Quick-Step	3h 30' 25"
2	Pavel Bittner (CZE)	Team dsm–firmenich PostNL	+ 0"
3	Itamar Einhorn (ISR)	Israel Premier Tech Academy	+ 0"
4	Maikel Zijlaard (NED)	Tudor Pro Cycling Team	+ 0"
5	Juan Sebastián Molano (COL)	UAE Team Emirates	+ 0"
6	Emīls Liepiņš (LAT)	Team dsm–firmenich PostNL	+ 0"
7	Joren Bloem (NED)	TDT–Unibet Cycling Team	+ 0"
8	Ben Swift (GBR)	INEOS Grenadiers	+ 0"
9	Alberto Bruttomesso (ITA)	Team Bahrain Victorious	+ 0"
10	Lukáš Kubiš (SVK)	Elkov–Kasper	+ 0"

General classification after Stage 1 (1–10)
Rank	Rider	Team	Time
1	Luke Lamperti (USA)	Soudal–Quick-Step	3h 30' 25"
2	Pavel Bittner (CZE)	Team dsm–firmenich PostNL	+ 03"
3	Itamar Einhorn (ISR)	Israel Premier Tech Academy	+ 06"
4	Tomáš Kalojiros (CZE)	Pierre Baguette Cycling	+ 07"
5	Filip Řeha (CZE)	ATT Investments	+ 08"
6	Maikel Zijlaard (NED)	Tudor Pro Cycling Team	+ 10"
7	Juan Sebastián Molano (COL)	UAE Team Emirates	+ 10"
8	Emīls Liepiņš (LAT)	Team dsm–firmenich PostNL	+ 10"
9	Joren Bloem (NED)	TDT–Unibet Cycling Team	+ 10"
10	Ben Swift (GBR)	INEOS Grenadiers	+ 10"

=== Stage 2 ===
26 July 2024 – Zlín to Pustevny, 172.7 km (107.3 mi)

Stage 2 Result (1–10)
Rank	Rider	Team	Time
1	Marc Hirschi (SUI)	UAE Team Emirates	4h 17' 42"
2	Diego Ulissi (ITA)	UAE Team Emirates	+ 11"
3	Sergio Higuita (COL)	Bora–Hansgrohe	+ 14"
4	Kevin Vermaerke (USA)	Team dsm–firmenich PostNL	+ 17"
5	Matteo Fabbro (ITA)	Polti–Kometa	+ 17"
6	Julian Alaphilippe (FRA)	Soudal–Quick-Step	+ 17"
7	Marco Brenner (GER)	Tudor Pro Cycling Team	+ 17"
8	Mark Donovan (GBR)	Q36.5 Pro Cycling Team	+ 17"
9	Kamiel Bonneu (BEL)	Team Flanders–Baloise	+ 17"
10	Michael Storer (AUS)	Tudor Pro Cycling Team	+ 17"

General classification after Stage 2 (1–10)
Rank	Rider	Team	Time
1	Marc Hirschi (SUI)	UAE Team Emirates	7h 47' 57"
2	Diego Ulissi (ITA)	UAE Team Emirates	+ 15"
3	Sergio Higuita (COL)	Bora–Hansgrohe	+ 20"
4	Kevin Vermaerke (USA)	Team dsm–firmenich PostNL	+ 27"
5	Marco Brenner (GER)	Tudor Pro Cycling Team	+ 27"
6	Matteo Fabbro (ITA)	Polti–Kometa	+ 27"
7	Julian Alaphilippe (FRA)	Soudal–Quick-Step	+ 27"
8	Mark Donovan (GBR)	Q36.5 Pro Cycling Team	+ 27"
9	Michael Storer (AUS)	Tudor Pro Cycling Team	+ 27"
10	Kamiel Bonneu (BEL)	Team Flanders–Baloise	+ 27"

=== Stage 3 ===
27 July 2024 – Moravská Třebová to Dlouhé stráně, 134 km (83 mi)

Stage 3 Result (1–10)
Rank	Rider	Team	Time
1	Thomas Gloag (GBR)	Visma–Lease a Bike	3h 17' 17"
2	Marc Hirschi (SUI)	UAE Team Emirates	+ 8'
3	Diego Ulissi (ITA)	UAE Team Emirates	+ 13"
4	Kevin Vermaerke (USA)	Team dsm–firmenich PostNL	+ 13"
5	Sergio Higuita (COL)	Bora–Hansgrohe	+ 13"
6	Marco Brenner (GER)	Tudor Pro Cycling Team	+ 13"
7	Andrew August (USA)	INEOS Grenadiers	+ 13"
8	Márton Dina (HUN)	ATT Investments	+ 19"
9	Andreas Leknessund (NOR)	Uno-X Mobility	+ 19"
10	Michael Storer (AUS)	Tudor Pro Cycling Team	+ 25"

General classification after Stage 3 (1–10)
Rank	Rider	Team	Time
1	Marc Hirschi (SUI)	UAE Team Emirates	11h 5' 26"
2	Diego Ulissi (ITA)	UAE Team Emirates	+ 18"
3	Sergio Higuita (COL)	Bora–Hansgrohe	+ 25"
4	Kevin Vermaerke (USA)	Team dsm–firmenich PostNL	+ 28"
5	Marco Brenner (GER)	Tudor Pro Cycling Team	+ 28"
6	Michael Storer (AUS)	Tudor Pro Cycling Team	+ 40"
7	Andrew August (USA)	INEOS Grenadiers	+ 44"
8	Mark Donovan (GBR)	Q36.5 Pro Cycling Team	+ 45"
9	Kamiel Bonneu (BEL)	Team Flanders–Baloise	+ 45"
10	Márton Dina (HUN)	ATT Investments	+ 46"

=== Stage 4 ===
28 July 2024 – Šumperk to Šternberk, 129.2 km (80.3 mi)

Stage 4 Result (1–10)
Rank	Rider	Team	Time
1	Julian Alaphilippe (FRA)	Soudal–Quick-Step	3h 1' 30"
2	Marc Hirschi (SUI)	UAE Team Emirates	+ 0'
3	Sergio Higuita (COL)	Bora–Hansgrohe	+ 0"
4	Mark Donovan (GBR)	Q36.5 Pro Cycling Team	+ 0"
5	Kevin Vermaerke (USA)	Team dsm–firmenich PostNL	+ 0"
6	Diego Ulissi (ITA)	UAE Team Emirates	+ 0"
7	Andrew August (USA)	INEOS Grenadiers	+ 0"
8	Kamiel Bonneu (BEL)	Team Flanders–Baloise	+ 0"
9	Marco Brenner (GER)	Tudor Pro Cycling Team	+ 0"
10	Andreas Leknessund (NOR)	Uno-X Mobility	+ 0"

General classification after Stage 4 (1–10)
Rank	Rider	Team	Time
1	Marc Hirschi (SUI)	UAE Team Emirates	14h 6' 40"
2	Diego Ulissi (ITA)	UAE Team Emirates	+ 28"
3	Sergio Higuita (COL)	Bora–Hansgrohe	+ 33"
4	Kevin Vermaerke (USA)	Team dsm–firmenich PostNL	+ 44"
5	Marco Brenner (GER)	Tudor Pro Cycling Team	+ 44"
6	Michael Storer (AUS)	Tudor Pro Cycling Team	+ 56"
7	Andrew August (USA)	INEOS Grenadiers	+ 1' 00"
8	Mark Donovan (GBR)	Q36.5 Pro Cycling Team	+ 1' 01"
9	Kamiel Bonneu (BEL)	Team Flanders–Baloise	+ 1' 01"
10	Andreas Leknessund (NOR)	Uno-X Mobility	+ 1' 18"

== Classification leadership table ==
Classification leadership by stage
Stage	Winner	General classification	Points classification	Mountains classification	Young rider classification	Czech rider classification	Team classification	Active rider award
1	Luke Lamperti	Luke Lamperti	Luke Lamperti	Tomáš Kalojíros	Luke Lamperti	Pavel Bittner	Team dsm–firmenich PostNL	Tomáš Kalojíros
2	Marc Hirschi	Marc Hirschi	Marc Hirschi	Michal Schuran	Marco Brenner	Martin Voltr	Bora–Hansgrohe	Michal Schuran
3	Thomas Gloag	Marc Hirschi	Marc Hirschi	Marc Hirschi	Marco Brenner	Martin Voltr	Polti–Kometa	Lukáš Kubiš
4	Julian Alaphilippe	Marc Hirschi	Marc Hirschi	Michal Schuran	Marco Brenner	Martin Voltr	Visma–Lease a Bike	not awarded
Final		Marc Hirschi	Marc Hirschi	Michal Schuran	Marco Brenner	Martin Voltr	Visma–Lease a Bike	Lukáš Kubiš

- On stage 2, Luke Lamperti led the general, points, and young rider classifications, and wore the yellow jersey. Pavel Bittner wore the green jersey as the runner-up of the points classification, while Alberto Bruttomesso wore the white jersey as the runner-up of the young rider classification. No riders wore the red jersey of the Czech classification.
- On stage 3, Marc Hirschi led the general and points classifications, and wore the yellow jersey. Luke Lamperti wore the green jersey as the runner-up of the points classification.
- On stage 4, Marc Hirschi led the general, points, and mountain classifications, and wore the yellow jersey. Diego Ulissi wore the green jersey as the runner-up of the points classification, while Michal Schuran wore the polka dot jersey as the runner-up of the mountain classification.

== Final classification standings ==
Legend
Denotes the winner of the general classification	Denotes the winner of the young rider classification
Denotes the winner of the points classification	Denotes the winner of the Czech rider classification
Denotes the winner of the mountain classification	Denotes the winner of the active rider award

=== General classification ===
Final general classification (1–10)
Rank	Rider	Team	Time
1	Marc Hirschi (SUI)	UAE Team Emirates	14h 6' 40"
2	Diego Ulissi (ITA)	UAE Team Emirates	+ 28"
3	Sergio Higuita (COL)	ATT Investments	+ 33"
4	Kevin Vermaerke (USA)	Team dsm–firmenich PostNL	+ 44"
5	Marco Brenner (GER)	Tudor Pro Cycling Team	+ 44"
6	Michael Storer (AUS)	Tudor Pro Cycling Team	+ 56"
7	Andrew August (USA)	INEOS Grenadiers	+ 1' 00"
8	Mark Donovan (GBR)	Q36.5 Pro Cycling Team	+ 1' 01"
9	Kamiel Bonneu (BEL)	Team Flanders–Baloise	+ 1' 01"
10	Andreas Leknessund (NOR)	Uno-X Mobility	+ 1' 18"

=== Points classification ===
Final general classification (1–10)
Rank	Rider	Team	Points
1	Marc Hirschi (SUI)	UAE Team Emirates	65
2	Diego Ulissi (ITA)	UAE Team Emirates	46
3	Sergio Higuita (COL)	ATT Investments	44
4	Kevin Vermaerke (USA)	Team dsm–firmenich PostNL	41
5	Julian Alaphilippe (FRA)	Soudal–Quick-Step	30
6	Luke Lamperti (USA)	Soudal–Quick-Step	28
7	Lukáš Kubiš (SVK)	Elkov–Kasper	26
8	Marco Brenner (GER)	Tudor Pro Cycling Team	26
9	Mark Donovan (GBR)	Q36.5 Pro Cycling Team	26
10	Thomas Gloag (GBR)	Visma–Lease a Bike	26

=== Mountains classification ===
Final general classification (1–10)
Rank	Rider	Team	Points
1	Michal Schuran (CZE)	ATT Investments	20
2	Lukáš Kubiš (SVK)	Elkov–Kasper	16
3	Marc Hirschi (SUI)	UAE Team Emirates	14
4	Diego Ulissi (ITA)	UAE Team Emirates	10
5	Thomas Gloag (GBR)	Visma–Lease a Bike	8
6	Paul Double (GBR)	Polti–Kometa	8
7	Tomáš Kalojiros (CZE)	Pierre Baguette Cycling	6
8	Kevin Vermaerke (USA)	Team dsm–firmenich PostNL	6
9	Mats Wenzel (NED)	Lidl–Trek Future Racing	6
10	Julian Alaphilippe (FRA)	Soudal–Quick-Step	4

=== Young rider classification ===
Final general classification (1–10)
Rank	Rider	Team	Time
1	Marco Brenner (GER)	Tudor Pro Cycling Team	14h 7' 24"
2	Andrew August (USA)	INEOS Grenadiers	+ 16' 00"
3	Johannes Staune-Mittet (NOR)	Visma–Lease a Bike	+ 3' 55"
4	Giacomo Villa (ITA)	Bingoal WB	+ 4' 59"
5	Mats Wenzel (NED)	Lidl–Trek Future Racing	+ 5' 36"
6	Alexander Hajek (AUT)	Bora–Hansgrohe	+ 7' 08"
7	Dario Igor Belletta (ITA)	Visma–Lease a Bike	+ 10' 09"
8	Finlay Pickering (GBR)	Team Bahrain Victorious	+ 11' 13"
9	Andrii Ponomar (UKR)	Team Corratec–Vini Fantini	+ 12' 29"
10	Michael Leonard (CAN)	INEOS Grenadiers	+ 13' 00"

=== Czech rider classification ===
Final general classification (1–10)
Rank	Rider	Team	Time
1	Martin Voltr (CZE)	Pierre Baguette Cycling	14h 11' 20"
2	Michael Boroš (CZE)	Elkov–Kasper	+ 2' 26"
3	Daniel Vysočan (CZE)	Pierre Baguette Cycling	+ 10' 13"
4	Tomáš Kopecký (CZE)	TDT–Unibet Cycling Team	+ 12' 06"
5	Jakub Otruba (CZE)	ATT Investments	+ 19' 15"
6	Daniel Turek (CZE)	ATT Investments	+ 24' 30"
7	Jakub Ťoupalík (CZE)	Elkov–Kasper	+ 25' 16"
8	Pavel Bittner (CZE)	Team dsm–firmenich PostNL	+ 25' 49"
9	Dominik Neuman (CZE)	ATT Investments	+ 29' 04"
10	Matěj Zahálka (CZE)	Elkov–Kasper	+ 30' 05"

=== Teams classification ===
Final general classification (1–10)
Rank	Team	Time
1	Visma–Lease a Bike	42h 31' 57"
2	Bora–Hansgrohe	+ 1' 05"
3	Polti–Kometa	+ 1' 47"
4	UAE Team Emirates	+ 1' 53"
5	Uno-X Mobility	+ 5' 10"
6	Team Corratec–Vini Fantini	+ 6' 06"
7	Tudor Pro Cycling Team	+ 7' 45"
8	Intermarché–Wanty	+ 10' 22"
9	Team Flanders–Baloise	+ 12' 00"
10	INEOS Grenadiers	+ 19' 05"
