= Kevin Vermaerke =

American cyclist (born 2000)

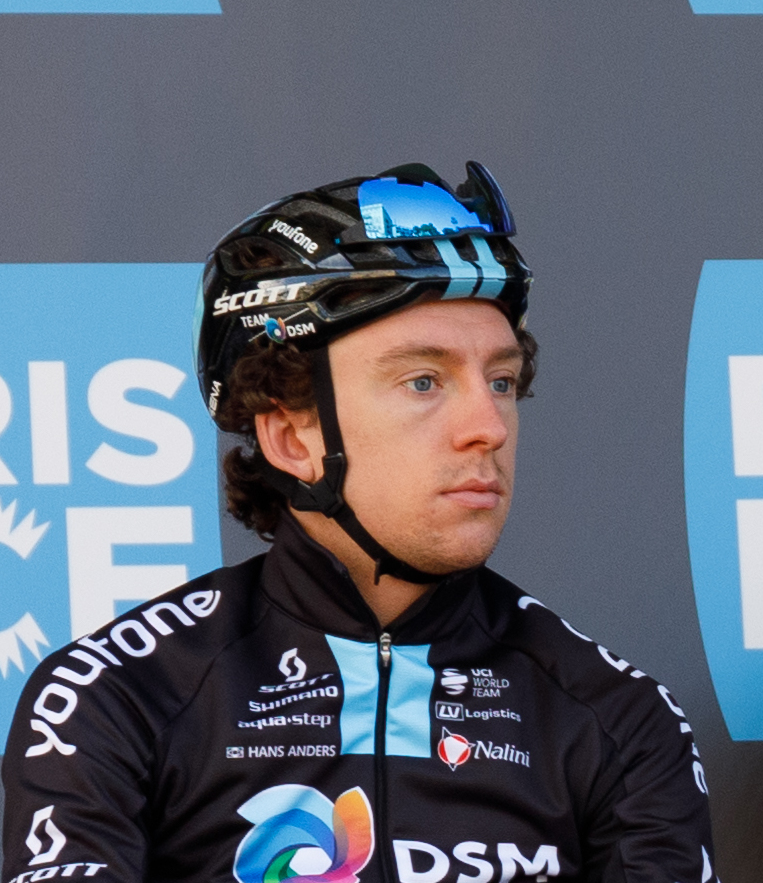
- Vermaerke at the 2023 Paris–Nice

Personal information
- Full name: Kevin Vermaerke
- Born: October 16, 2000 (age 26) Johannesburg, South Africa

Cycling career
- Sport: Cycling
- Current team: UAE Team Emirates XRG
- Discipline: Road
- Role: Rider

Amateur teams
- 2015: Rokform
- 2016: Velosport–Ridebiker Alliance
- 2017–2018: LUX–Stradling–Specialized

Professional teams
- 2019–2020: Hagens Berman Axeon
- 2020: Team Sunweb (stagiaire)
- 2021–2025: Team DSM
- 2026–: UAE Team Emirates XRG

Kevin Vermaerke (born October 16, 2000) is an American cyclist who currently rides for UCI WorldTeam UAE Team Emirates XRG. Vermaerke grew up in Southern California. He turned professional in 2021 signing for Team DSM. He signed with Team UAE in late 2025 for the 2026 season.

== Major results ==
2017
1st Cross-country, National Junior MTB Championships
2nd Road race, National Junior Road Championships
2018
8th Road race, UCI Junior Road World Championships
2019
1st Liège–Bastogne–Liège Espoirs
2nd Overall Redlands Bicycle Classic

1st Stage 2

4th Lillehammer GP
2023
3rd Overall Arctic Race of Norway

1st Young rider classification

6th Overall Deutschland Tour
6th Figueira Champions Classic
8th Overall Vuelta a San Juan
2024
3rd Overall Arctic Race of Norway

1st Young rider classification

4th Overall Czech Tour
4th Clásica de San Sebastián
5th Milano–Torino
6th Overall Tour des Alpes-Maritimes
6th Ardèche Classic
7th Eschborn–Frankfurt
8th Classic Var
10th Overall Deutschland Tour
2025
6th Overall Arctic Race of Norway
2026
2nd Overall Tour of Austria

1st Points classification

Vuelta a España

Combativity award Stages 14 & 16

=== Grand Tour general classification results timeline ===
Grand Tour	2022	2023	2024
Giro d'Italia	—	—	29
Tour de France	DNF	61	
Vuelta a España	—	—	

Legend
—	Did not compete
DNF	Did not finish
