= Jakub Otruba =

Czech cyclist (born 1998)

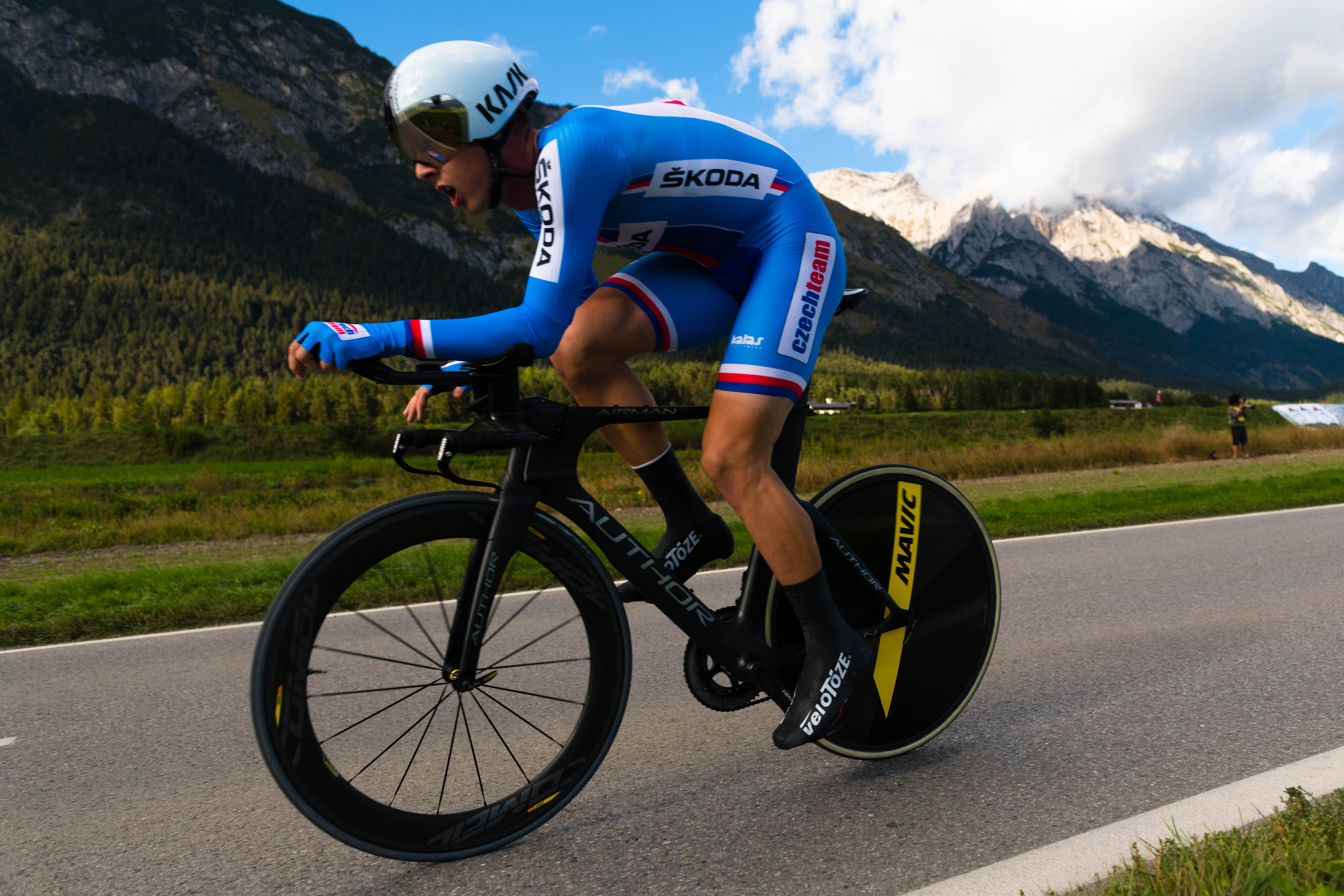
- Otruba in 2018

Personal information
- Born: 30 January 1998 (age 28) Olomouc, Czech Republic
- Height: 1.9 m (6 ft 3 in)
- Weight: 75 kg (165 lb)

Cycling career
- Sport: Cycling
- Current team: Caja Rural–Seguros RGA
- Discipline: Road
- Role: Rider

Professional teams
- 2017: SKC TUFO Prostějov
- 2018–2022: Elkov–Author
- 2023–2024: ATT Investments
- 2025–: Caja Rural–Seguros RGA

Major wins
- One-day races and Classics National Time Trial Championships (2023)

Jakub Otruba (born 30 January 1998) is a Czech racing cyclist, who currently rides for UCI ProTeam Caja Rural–Seguros RGA. He rode for Elkov–Author in the men's team time trial event at the 2018 UCI Road World Championships.

== Major results ==
2015
National Junior Road Championships

1st Time trial
2nd Road race

2016
National Junior Road Championships

1st Road race
2nd Time trial

8th Time trial, UEC European Junior Road Championships
2018
National Under-23 Road Championships

1st Road race
1st Time trial

3rd Road race, National Road Championships
4th Time trial, UEC European Under-23 Road Championships
2019
1st Time trial, National Under-23 Road Championships
7th Overall Czech Cycling Tour

1st Young rider classification

8th Time trial, European Games
8th Time trial, UEC European Under-23 Road Championships
2020
1st Time trial, National Under-23 Road Championships
6th Overall Czech Cycling Tour

1st Young rider classification

9th Time trial, UEC European Under-23 Road Championships
9th Overall Okolo Slovenska
2021
3rd Overall Alpes Isère Tour
4th Time trial, National Road Championships
5th Overall Circuit des Ardennes
5th GP Czech Republic
7th Overall Tour of Malopolska
10th Overall Oberösterreichrundfahrt
2022 (1 pro win)
3rd Time trial, National Road Championships
3rd Overall Tour of Romania

1st Stage 4

3rd Overall Tour of Malopolska
5th Overall Okolo Slovenska
10th Overall Alpes Isère Tour
2023 (1)
1st Time trial, National Road Championships
1st Overall South Aegean Tour
3rd Overall Sibiu Cycling Tour
3rd Overall Czech Tour
4th Overall International Tour of Rhodes
5th Overall International Tour of Hellas
9th Overall Oberösterreich Rundfahrt
9th GP Poland
10th Overall Okolo Slovenska
10th Overall CRO Race
2024
1st Silesian Classic
1st Stage 4 Tour of Bulgaria
3rd Time trial, National Road Championships
5th Overall International Tour of Hellas
2025
1st Stage 1 Troféu Joaquim Agostinho
National Road Championships

3rd Time trial
4th Road race

Combativity award Stage 19 Vuelta a España
2026
National Road Championships

2nd Time trial
3rd Road race

=== Grand Tour general classification results timeline ===
Grand Tour	2025	2026
Giro d'Italia	—	—
Tour de France	—	112
Vuelta a España	90	—

Legend
—	Did not compete
DNF	Did not finish
