= Jelle Johannink =

Dutch cyclist

Personal information
- Born: 22 October 1996 (age 29) Denekamp, Netherlands
- Height: 1.81 m (5 ft 11 in)

Cycling career
- Sport: Cycling
- Current team: Unibet Rose Rockets
- Discipline: Road
- Role: Rider

Amateur teams
- 2015: OWC Oldenzaal
- 2016–2022: Sensa–Kanjers voor Kanjers CT

Professional teams
- 2023: ABLOC CT
- 2024–: TDT–Unibet Cycling Team

Jelle Johannink (born 22 October 1996) is a Dutch professional racing cyclist, who currently rides for UCI ProTeam Unibet Rose Rockets.

== Career ==
Johannink was born into a farming family in Denekamp. After playing football, he turned to cycling at the age of seventeen, beginning his career with OWC Oldenzaal. As an amateur cyclist, he balanced competition with work on his parents' farm.

Between 2017 and 2022, he rode for the Sensa–Kanjers voor Kanjers club. With this team, he excelled mainly in Dutch races and in various editions of the Arden Challenge. He also finished second in the Oder-Rundfahrt in July 2022, while also winning a stage. That same year, he became the Dutch amateur champion.

In 2023, he joined the UCI Continental team ABLOC CT. A strong road sprinter, he won two local races in the Netherlands. He also finished third in a stage of the Tour of Qinghai Lake, fourth in a stage of the Flèche du Sud, tenth in the Arno Wallaard Memorial, and fifteenth in the Dutch National Road Race Championships. Thanks to these performances, he turned professional in 2024 with UCI ProTeam TDT–Unibet Cycling Team.

In early 2026, he finished second in the Visit South Aegean GP behind Bryan Coquard.

== Major results ==
2018
1st Ronde van de Vijver
1st Stage 5 Arden Challenge
2019
2nd Overall Arden Challenge
2022
1st CCM-Dronterland Zuiderzeeronde
2nd Overall Arden Challenge
2nd Oder-Rundfahrt

1st Stage 3 (ITT)

2023
1st Ronde van de Vijver
1st Ton Dolmans Trofee
10th Arno Wallaard Memorial
2024
1st Mountains classification, Arctic Race of Norway
6th Volta Limburg Classic
10th Ster van Zwolle
2025
6th Volta Limburg Classic
2026
2nd Visit South Aegean GP
3rd Region on Dodecanese GP
10th Trofeo Andratx - Pollença
