= Florian Lipowitz =

German cyclist (born 2000)

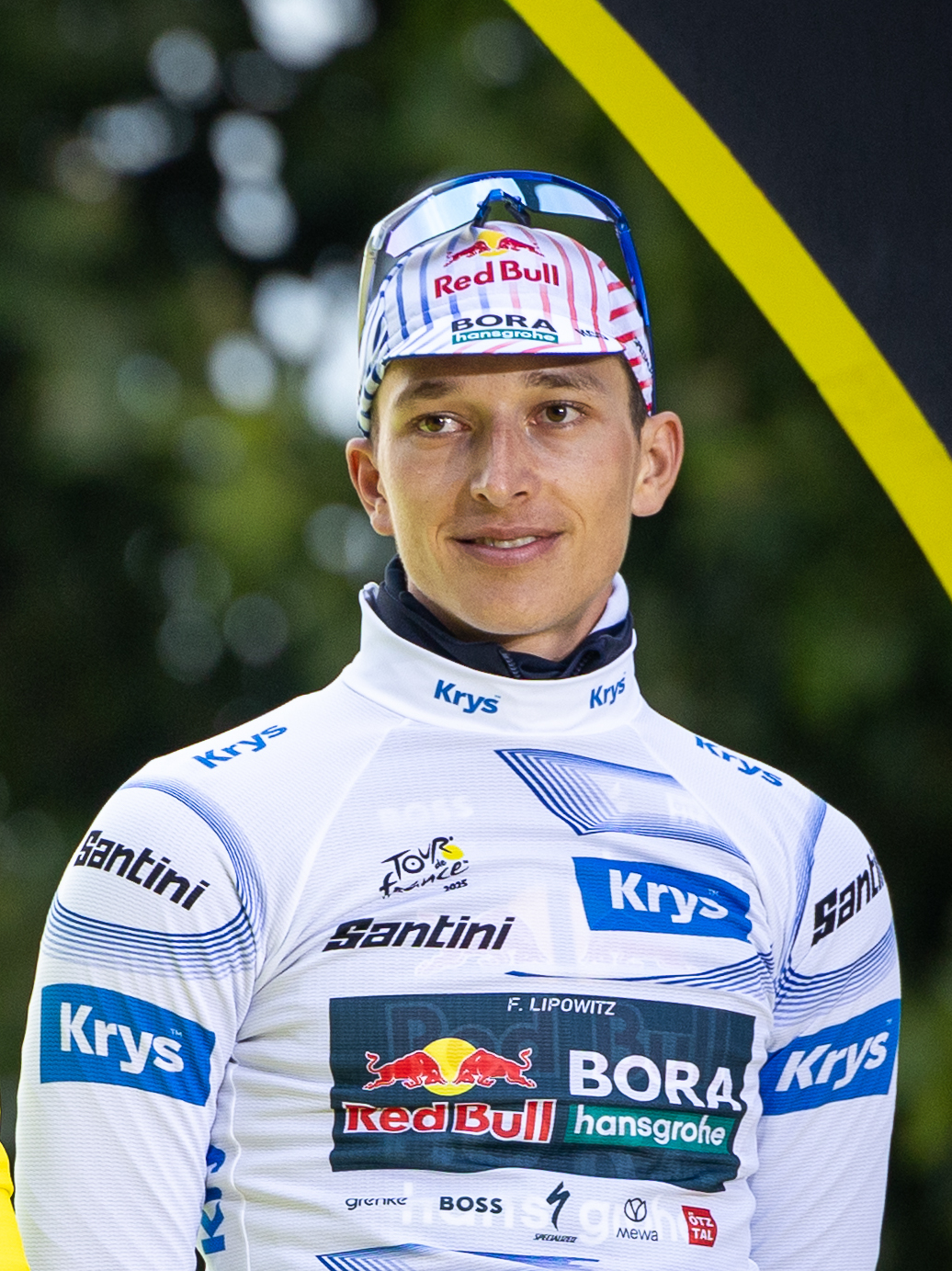
- Lipowitz in the 2025 Tour de France

Personal information
- Born: 21 September 2000 (age 26) Laichingen, Germany
- Height: 1.81 m (5 ft 11 1/2 in)
- Weight: 68 kg (150 lb; 10 st 10 lb)

Cycling career
- Sport: Cycling
- Current team: Red Bull–Bora–Hansgrohe
- Discipline: Road
- Role: Rider
- Rider type: Climbing specialist

Professional teams
- 2020–2022: Tirol KTM Cycling Team
- 2022: Bora–Hansgrohe (stagiaire)
- 2023–: Bora–Hansgrohe

Major wins
- Grand Tours Tour de France Young rider classification (2025) Stage races Tour of Slovenia (2026)

Florian Lipowitz (born 21 September 2000) is a German racing cyclist racing for UCI WorldTeam Red Bull–Bora–Hansgrohe.

== Personal life, transition & education ==
Lipowitz was raised in an athletic family; his father is known for being involved in many endurance sports, while his older brother Philipp became a professional biathlete. In his youth, Lipowitz took part in long-distance bike racing events alongside his father, who occasionally entered the same races, setting the stage for his early interest in road cycling. He subsequently attended the Schigymnasium Stams, an elite sports boarding school in Austria, where he focused on biathlon before graduating with his Matura in 2020. Following a series of injuries in biathlon, he transitioned fully to road bicycle racing, eventually rising to the WorldTour ranks. Alongside his professional cycling career, he has stated in 2021 that he planned to start a degree in computer science at a distance learning university.

== Career ==
Lipowitz originally competed in the biathlon and used cycling as training during the summer. After a knee injury, he had to increase his cycling training and met Dan Lorang, the performance director of Bora–Hansgrohe. In 2020, he switched fully to cycling and joined Austrian UCI Continental team Tirol KTM Cycling Team.

In 2021 Lipowitz was part of the team that Tirol KTM Cycling Team sent to the 2021 Adriatica Ionica Race. After finishing thirteenth in the second stage, 2:03 down on the winner, he held onto his position in the Overall to finish thirteenth Overall and fourth in the youth classification.

Lipowitz joined UCI WorldTeam Bora–Hansgrohe as a Stagiaire from August to the end of 2022 before joining the team on a two-year contract. He took his first professional victory in 2023, winning the overall title as well as stage two and the points classification of the Czech Tour.

In April 2024, Lipowitz claimed his first podium position at an UCI World Tour stage race finishing third at the Tour de Romandie. At the Giro d'Italia he placed fifth on stage two but had to withdraw from his first Grand Tour after stage five. At the German Road Cycling Championships he was only beaten by Marco Brenner and came second. For the 2024 Vuelta a España his job was the support of Primož Roglič in the mountains. While Roglič won the tour Lipowitz was able to finish as seventh overall and second in the young rider classification.

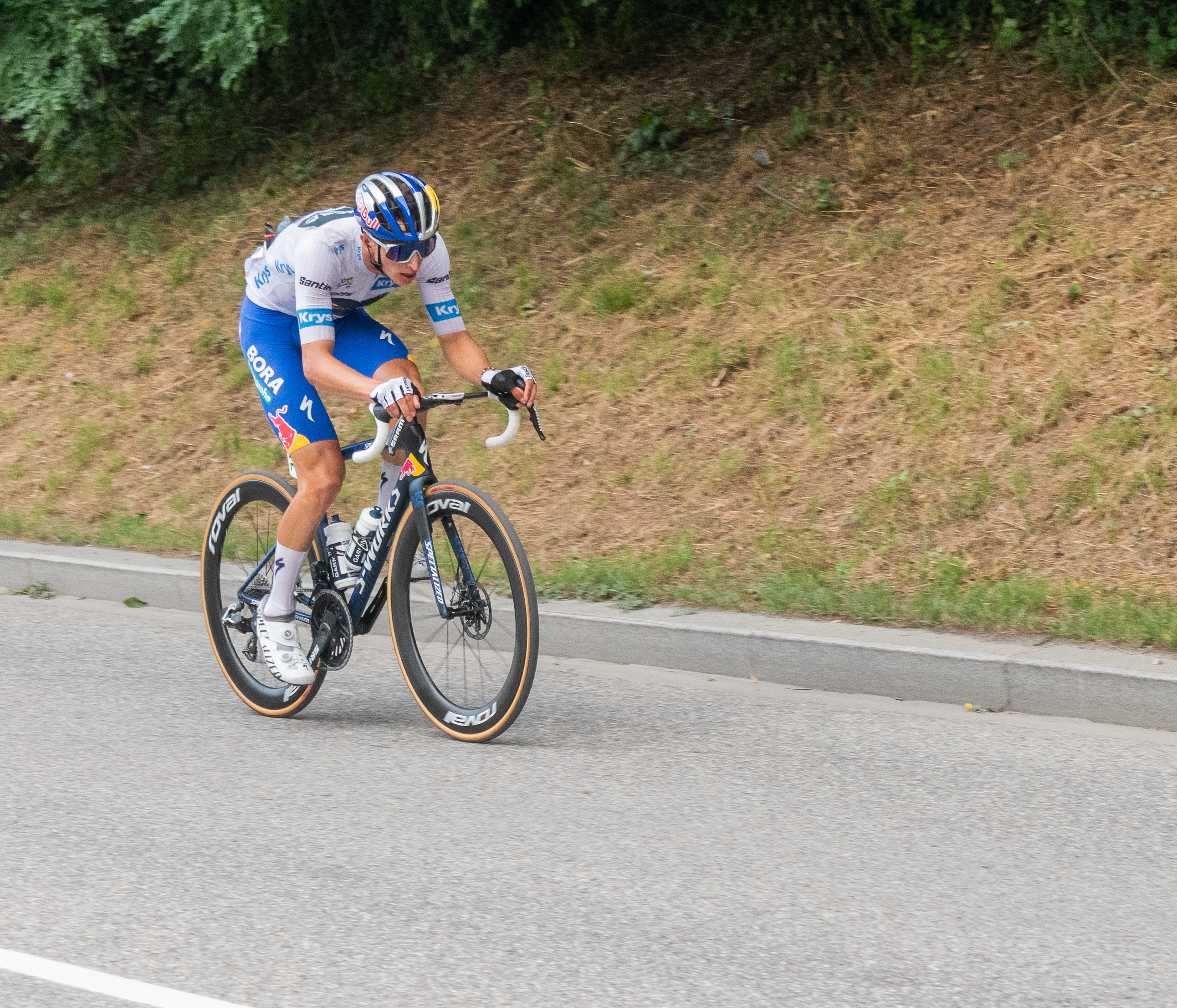
Lipowitz at the 2025 Tour de France

In 2025, Florian Lipowitz came out on top in the young rider classification of Paris-Nice at the age of 24 and was only beaten in the overall standings by Matteo Jorgenson from the United States. A month later, he finished the Tour of the Basque Country in fourth place overall, having appeared set to move up into 2nd before a bad-timed mechanical. At the Critérium du Dauphiné in June, he finished third, beaten only by Tadej Pogačar and Jonas Vingegaard. He also won the young rider classification as best young professional. At the Tour de France, Lipowitz finished in third place overall, again beaten only by Pogačar and Vingegaard, and won the best young rider classification.

Lipowitz was forced to abandon the 2026 Tour de France during the stage 16 time trial after crashing and breaking his collarbone.

== Major results ==
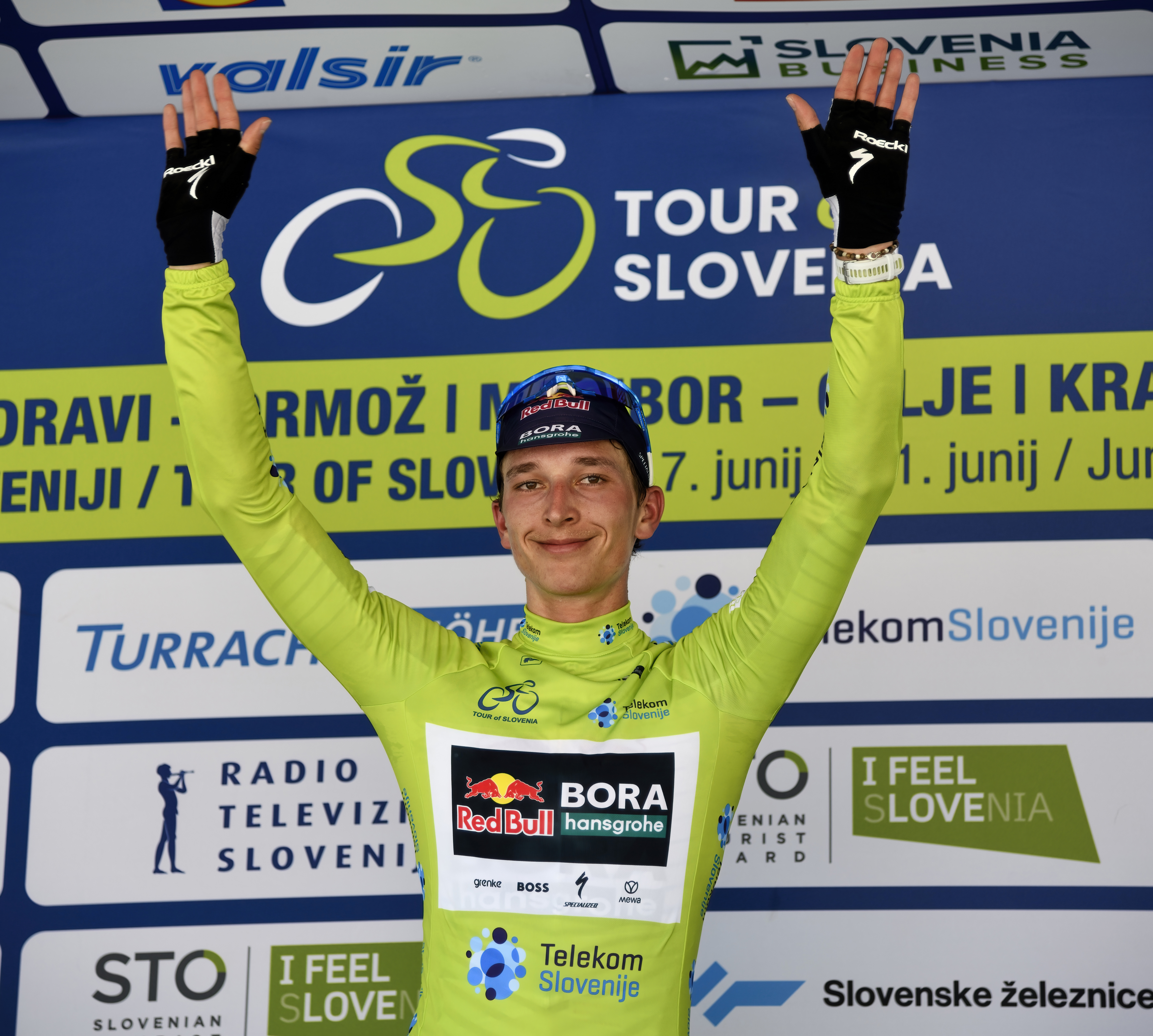
Lipowitz at 2026 Tour of Slovenia, winner of the race

2021
5th Overall Giro della Valle d'Aosta
10th Overall Grand Prix Jeseníky
2022
8th GP Capodarco
2023 (2 pro wins)
1st Overall Czech Tour

1st Points classification
1st Stage 2

4th Overall Tour of Turkey
6th Overall Sibiu Cycling Tour
2024 (1)
1st Overall Sibiu Cycling Tour

1st Mountains classification

2nd Road race, National Road Championships
3rd Overall Tour de Romandie
7th Overall Vuelta a España

Held after Stages 6, 9–10 & 15

2025
2nd Overall Paris–Nice

1st Young rider classification

3rd Overall Tour de France

1st Young rider classification

3rd Overall Critérium du Dauphiné

1st Young rider classification

4th Overall Tour of the Basque Country
2026 (3)
1st Overall Tour of Slovenia

1st Mountains classification
1st Stages 4 & 5

1st (TTT) Trofeo Ses Salines
2nd Overall Tour of the Basque Country
2nd Overall Tour de Romandie
3rd Overall Volta a Catalunya
8th Overall Volta ao Algarve

=== General classification results timeline ===
Grand Tour general classification results
Grand Tour	2023	2024	2025	2026
Giro d'Italia	—	DNF	—	—
Tour de France	—	—	3	DNF
Vuelta a España	—	7	—	
Major stage race general classification results
Race	2023	2024	2025	2026
Paris–Nice	—	—	2	—
Tirreno–Adriatico	—	—	—	—
Volta a Catalunya	—	45	—	3
Tour of the Basque Country	75	—	4	2
Tour de Romandie	—	3	—	2
Critérium du Dauphiné	—	—	3	—
Tour de Suisse	—	—	—	—

Legend
—	Did not compete
DNF	Did not finish
