= Lukas Nerurkar =

British cyclist (born 2003)

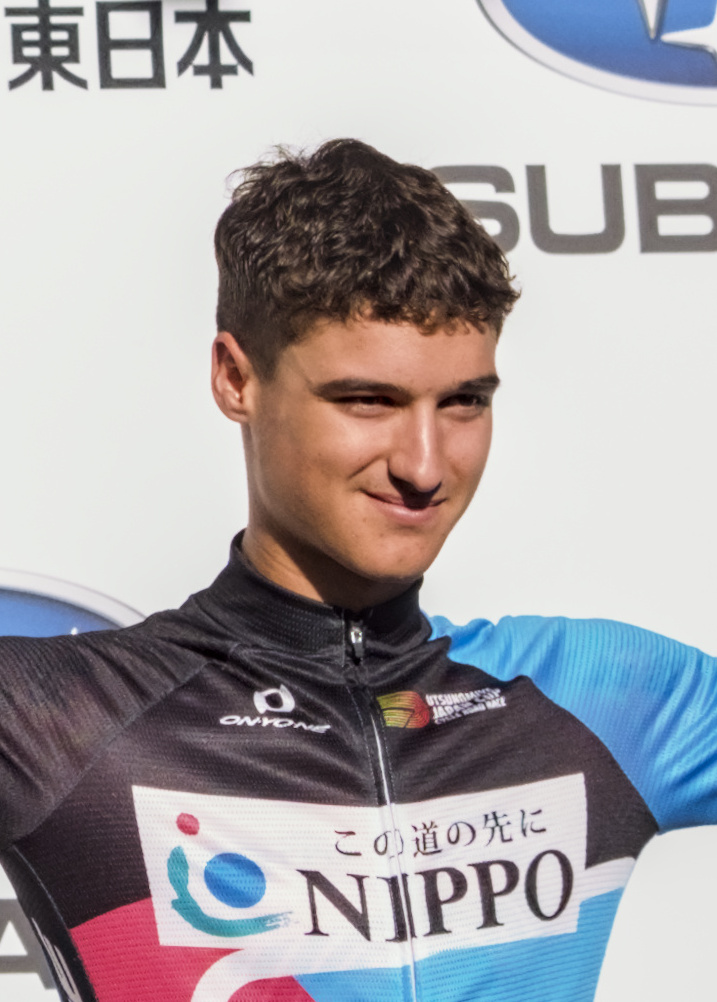
- Nerurkar in 2024

Personal information
- Born: 14 November 2003 (age 22) Truro, England
- Height: 1.77 m (5 ft 10 in)

Cycling career
- Sport: Cycling
- Current team: EF Education–EasyPost
- Discipline: Road
- Role: Rider

Amateur team
- 2021: VC Londres

Professional teams
- 2022–2023: Trinity Racing
- 2024–: EF Education–EasyPost

Lukas Nerurkar (born 14 November 2003) is a British professional cyclist, who rides for UCI WorldTeam EF Education–EasyPost.

== Early life ==
Nerurkar grew up in Ethiopia before moving to Sussex in England. His godfather is Haile Gebrselassie. He took part in long distance running events until he was sixteen years-old. He attended Cardinal Newman Catholic School in Hove. He lives in Brighton, England, and in Andorra.

== Career ==
As a junior rider, Nerurkar finished fourth overall in the Junior Tour of Wales and won a stage of the Junior Tour of Yorkshire. He was announced as joining Trinity Racing in December 2021.

=== Trinity Racing (2022–2023) ===
In February 2023, Nerurkar won the young rider classification as he finished sixth behind winner Jonas Vingegaard at the O Gran Camiño stage race in Spain. In May 2023, Nerurkar triumphed at the Orlen Nations Grand Prix, by winning stage 2. In June 2023, Nerurkar won stage five of the Giro Next Gen.

=== EF Education–EasyPost (2024–) ===
In September 2023, it was announced he signed a two-year contract with UCI WorldTeam EF Education–EasyPost for the following season. As a 20 year old, he finished 3rd on stage 3 of the 2024 Critérium du Dauphiné, having finished 7th the day before. He made his Grand Tour debut at the 2025 Vuelta a España where he finished 104th overall.

In July 2026, Nerurkar was hit by a vehicle whilst training. He had a dislocated and broken collarbone, fractured sternum and vertebra, a broken rib, and a punctured lung.

== Personal life ==
He is the son of British Olympic marathon runner Richard Nerurkar. His mother Gail ran competitively at county level. His sister Almi is a long distance runner.

== Major results ==
2021
1st Circuito Villatuert
4th Overall Junior Tour of Wales
5th Road race, National Junior Road Championships
5th Overall Junior Tour of Yorkshire

1st Stage 2

2023
1st Stage 2 Orlen Nations Grand Prix
1st Stage 5 Giro Next Gen
5th Beaumont Trophy
6th Overall O Gran Camiño

1st Young rider classification

9th Overall Czech Tour
9th Piccolo Giro di Lombardia
2024
2nd Overall Tour de Kyushu

1st Young rider classification

4th Eschborn–Frankfurt
6th Trofeo Serra de Tramuntana
9th Mercan'Tour Classic
9th Japan Cup
2025
3rd Clásica Terres de l'Ebre
6th Andorra MoraBanc Clàssica
10th Overall Tour of Guangxi
2026
4th Gran Piemonte
8th GP Gippingen
9th La Drôme Classic
10th Coppa Sabatini

=== Grand Tour general classification results timeline ===
Grand Tour	2025	2026
Giro d'Italia	—	—
Tour de France	—	—
Vuelta a España	104	—

Legend
—	Did not compete
DNF	Did not finish
