= Kamiel Bonneu =

Belgian cyclist (born 1999)

Personal information
- Born: 1 August 1999 (age 27) Hamont-Achel, Belgium
- Height: 1.78 m (5 ft 10 in)
- Weight: 62 kg (137 lb)

Cycling career
- Sport: Cycling
- Current team: Intermarché–Wanty
- Discipline: Road
- Role: Rider

Amateur teams
- 2016–2017: Davo–Tongeren
- 2018–2019: Home Solution–Soenens
- 2020: GM Recycling Team
- 2021: Basso Team Flanders

Professional teams
- 2022–2024: Sport Vlaanderen–Baloise
- 2025: Intermarché–Wanty
- 2026–: Solution Tech NIPPO Rali

Kamiel Bonneu (born 1 August 1999) is a Belgian racing cyclist, who currently rides for UCI WorldTeam Solution Tech NIPPO Rali.

== Major results ==
2017
5th La Philippe Gilbert Juniors
2021
7th Liège–Bastogne–Liège Espoirs
2022 (2 pro wins)
1st Stage 3 Tour of Britain
1st Stage 3 Sazka Tour
5th Volta Limburg Classic
10th Overall Tour de Hongrie
10th Classic Loire Atlantique
2023
4th Overall Czech Tour
7th Volta Limburg Classic
8th Overall Tour of Britain
9th Overall Arctic Race of Norway
2024 (1)
6th Overall Arctic Race of Norway

1st Stage 3

9th Overall Tour of Norway
9th Overall Czech Tour
2025
7th Overall Tour of Guangxi\
2026
2nd Overall Tour of Japan

1st Stage 4 (TTT)

3rd Overall Tour of Turkiye

=== Grand Tour general classification results timeline ===
Grand Tour	2025
Giro d'Italia	—
Tour de France	—
Vuelta a España	115

Legend
—	Did not compete
DNF	Did not finish
