= Czech Tour =

Czech cycling race

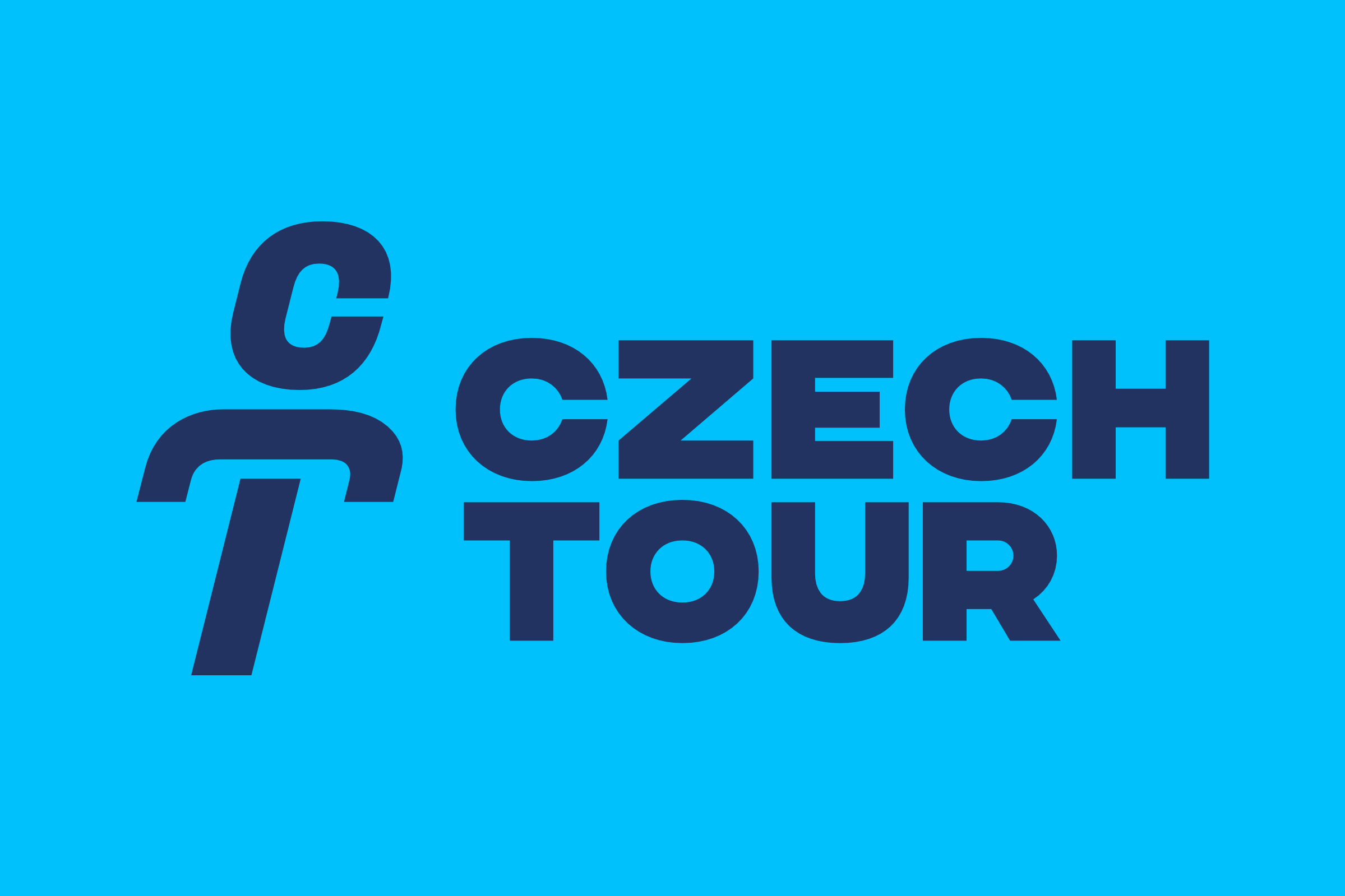

Race details
- Region: Czech Republic
- Discipline: Road race
- Competition: UCI ProSeries
- Type: Stage race
- Race director: Leopold König
- Web site: www.czechtour.com

History
- First edition: 2009
- Editions: 17 (as of 2026)
- First winner: Martin Hebík (CZE)
- Most wins: Leopold König (CZE) (2 wins)
- Most recent: Andrew August (USA)

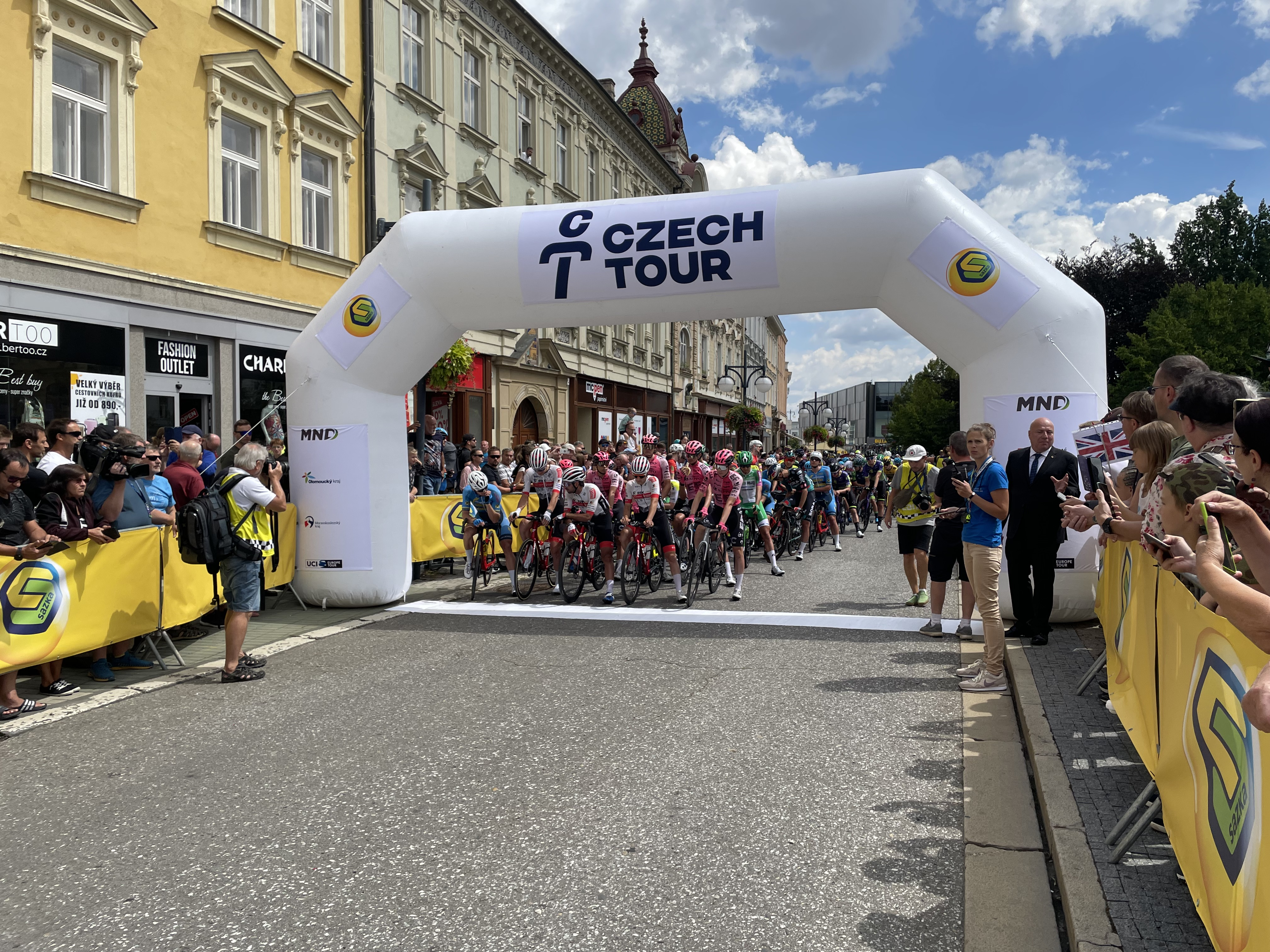
Start line of the 2023 Czech Tour's opening stage in Prostějov.

The Czech Tour is an annual men's professional multiple stage bicycle race held in the Czech Republic. It is the largest race of its kind in the country. From 2015 to 2025, the Czech Tour was included in the UCI Europe Tour as a 2.1 event, before moving up to the UCI ProSeries in 2026.

The tour takes place in the Olomouc, Moravian-Silesian and Pardubice regions, and passes through the Jeseníky and Beskydy mountain ranges. Climbing routes frequently feature Dlouhé stráně mountain, and the Pustevny and Červenohorské saddles. Since 2019, the tour has concluded in Šternberk.

== History ==
The inaugural Czech Tour occurred in 2009 as the Czech Cycling Tour. The following year's race was won by Leopold König, who later became the tour's race director.

Czech lottery company Sazka became the main partner of the tour in 2021, and the event was marketed as the Sazka Tour until 2023. This partnership corresponded with an increased difficulty in the race route by favoring hilly and mountainous stages. In the 2024 edition, the lineup included eight UCI WorldTeams, the most in its history.

Notable cyclists who have participated in the tour include Primož Roglič in 2015, Julian Alaphilippe in 2013 and 2024, and Simon Yates in 2013.

Since 2022, the tour has been accompanied by the Czech Challenge Tour, an amateur race for youth and hobby cyclists. Prize money is provided in Czech koruna.

== Winners ==
=== General classification ===
| Year | Country | Rider | Team |
|---|---|---|---|
| 2009 | Czech Republic | Martin Hebík | PSK Whirlpool–Author |
| 2010 | Czech Republic | Leopold König | PSK Whirlpool–Author |
| 2011 | Czech Republic | Stanislav Kozubek | PSK Whirlpool–Author |
| 2012 | Czech Republic | František Padour | Whirlpool–Author |
| 2013 | Czech Republic | Leopold König | NetApp–Endura |
| 2014 | Denmark | Martin Mortensen | Cult Energy–Vital Water |
| 2015 | Czech Republic | Petr Vakoč | Etixx–Quick-Step |
| 2016 | Italy | Diego Ulissi | Lampre–Merida |
| 2017 | Czech Republic | Josef Černý | Elkov–Author |
| 2018 | Austria | Riccardo Zoidl | Team Felbermayr–Simplon Wels |
| 2019 | South Africa | Daryl Impey | Mitchelton–Scott |
| 2020 | Australia | Damien Howson | Mitchelton–Scott |
| 2021 | Italy | Filippo Zana | Bardiani–CSF–Faizanè |
| 2022 | Italy | Lorenzo Rota | Intermarché–Wanty–Gobert Matériaux |
| 2023 | Germany | Florian Lipowitz | Bora–Hansgrohe |
| 2024 | Switzerland | Marc Hirschi | UAE Team Emirates |
| 2025 | Belgium | Junior Lecerf | Soudal–Quick-Step |
| 2026 | United States | Andrew August | Netcompany INEOS |

== Classifications ==
As of the 2024 edition, the jerseys worn by the leaders of the individual classifications are:
- Yellow Jersey – Worn by the leader of the general classification.
- Green Jersey – Worn by the leader of the points classification.
- Polka Dot Jersey – Worn by the leader of the mountains classification.
- White Jersey – Worn by the leader of the young rider classification, under 23 years of age. In the 2022 edition, the young rider classification was designated by a red jersey.
- Red Jersey – Worn by the leader of the Czech rider classification.
