= AJ August =

American cyclist

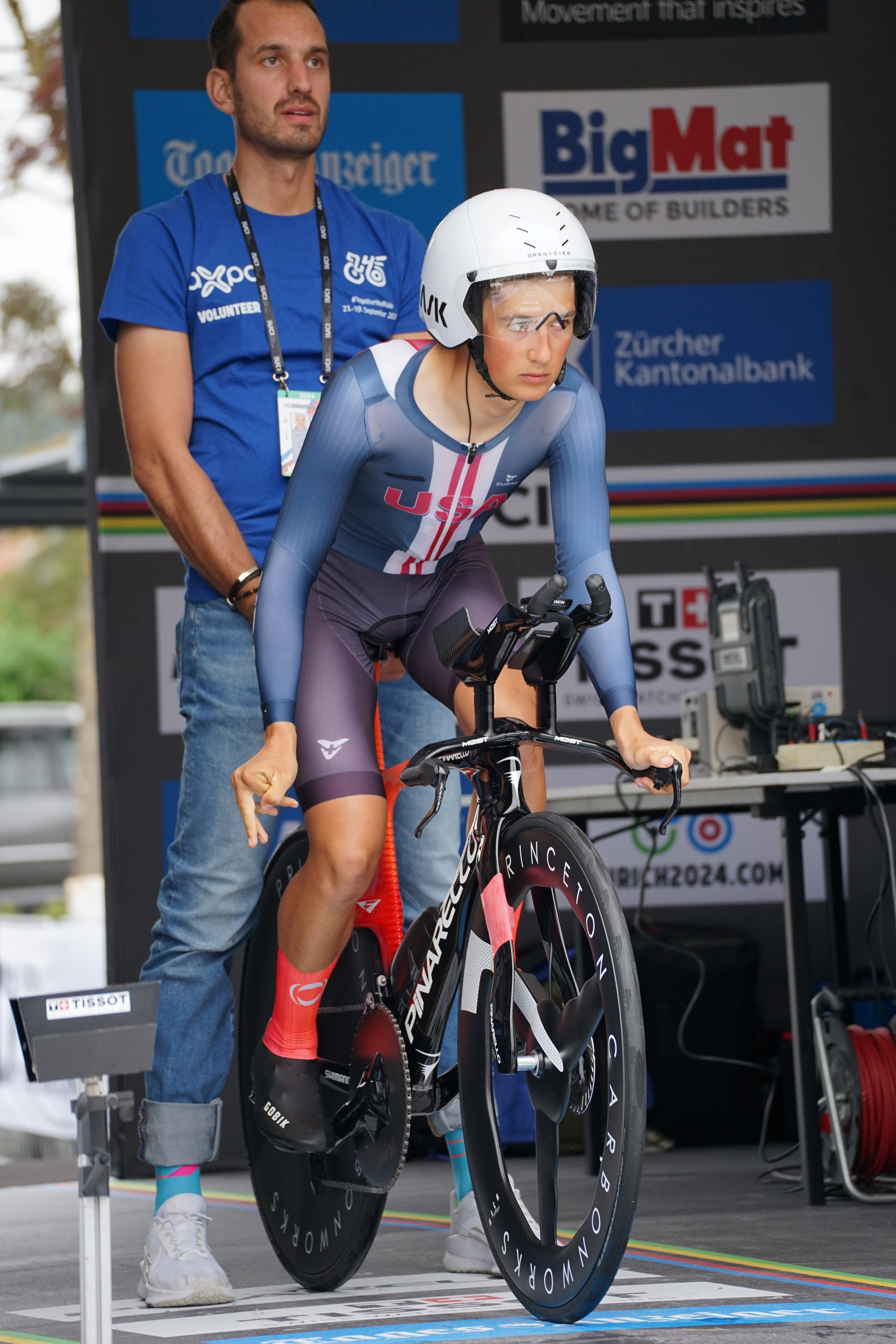
- August during the 2024 World Championships

Personal information
- Born: 12 October 2005 (age 21) Rochester, New York United States

Cycling career
- Sport: Cycling
- Current team: Netcompany–Ineos
- Disciplines: Cyclocross; Road
- Role: Rider
- Rider type: Puncheur

Amateur team
- 2021–2023: Hot Tubes Cycling

Professional team
- 2024–: INEOS Grenadiers

Major wins
- Stage races Czech Tour (2026)

Andrew "AJ" August (born 12 October 2005) is an American racing cyclist, who currently rides for UCI WorldTeam Netcompany–Ineos.

== Career ==
In 2022 August raced the Junior Tour of Ireland, where during stage four he won all but the first KOM points and put 47 seconds into almost all his competitors. He went on to wear the race leader's jersey and take the overall win. He received further recognition in the junior ranks by setting the fastest time up the Brasstown Bald climb, ahead of Phil Gaimon and Magnus Sheffield. August raced for the American under-19 team Hot Tubes Cycling from 2021 until the end of 2023, when he signed a three-year contract with INEOS Grenadiers.

== Major results ==
=== Road ===
2021
1st Overall Green Mountain Stage Race Juniors

1st Stage 1

2022
1st Overall Junior Tour of Ireland

1st Young rider classification
1st Stage 4

1st Stage 3 Watersley Junior Challenge
2nd Overall Ronde des Vallées Juniors

1st Young rider classification

2nd Overall Vuelta Ribera del Duero

1st Young rider classification

6th Overall Valley of the Sun Stage Race
8th Overall Junioren Rundfahrt

1st Young rider classification

9th Overall Driedaagse van Axel
2023
1st Time trial, National Junior Championships
1st Overall Tour du Valromey

1st Stages 4 & 5

2nd Overall Redlands Bicycle Classic

1st Stage 2

2nd Overall Peace Race Juniors
4th Overall Green Mountain Stage Race

1st Stage 1

5th Overall Valley of the Sun Stage Race

1st Stage 1 (ITT)

6th Overall Driedaagse van Axel

1st Stage 2

2024
7th Overall Czech Tour
2025
5th Overall Tour of Austria
2026 (5 pro wins)
1st Overall Czech Tour

1st Points classification
1st Young rider classification
1st Stages 2 & 3

1st Stage 6 Tour of the Basque Country
1st Stage 3 Volta a la Comunitat Valenciana
6th Overall Tour of Austria

1st Young rider classification

7th Overall Settimana Internazionale di Coppi e Bartali

1st Young rider classification

7th Overall Tour de la Provence

=== Cyclo-cross ===
2021–2022
2nd National Junior Championships
2022–2023
1st National Junior Championships
Junior X²O Badkamers Trophy

1st Koppenberg

UCI Junior World Cup

4th Maasmechelen
4th Benidorm
