= Marco Brenner =

German cyclist (born 2002)

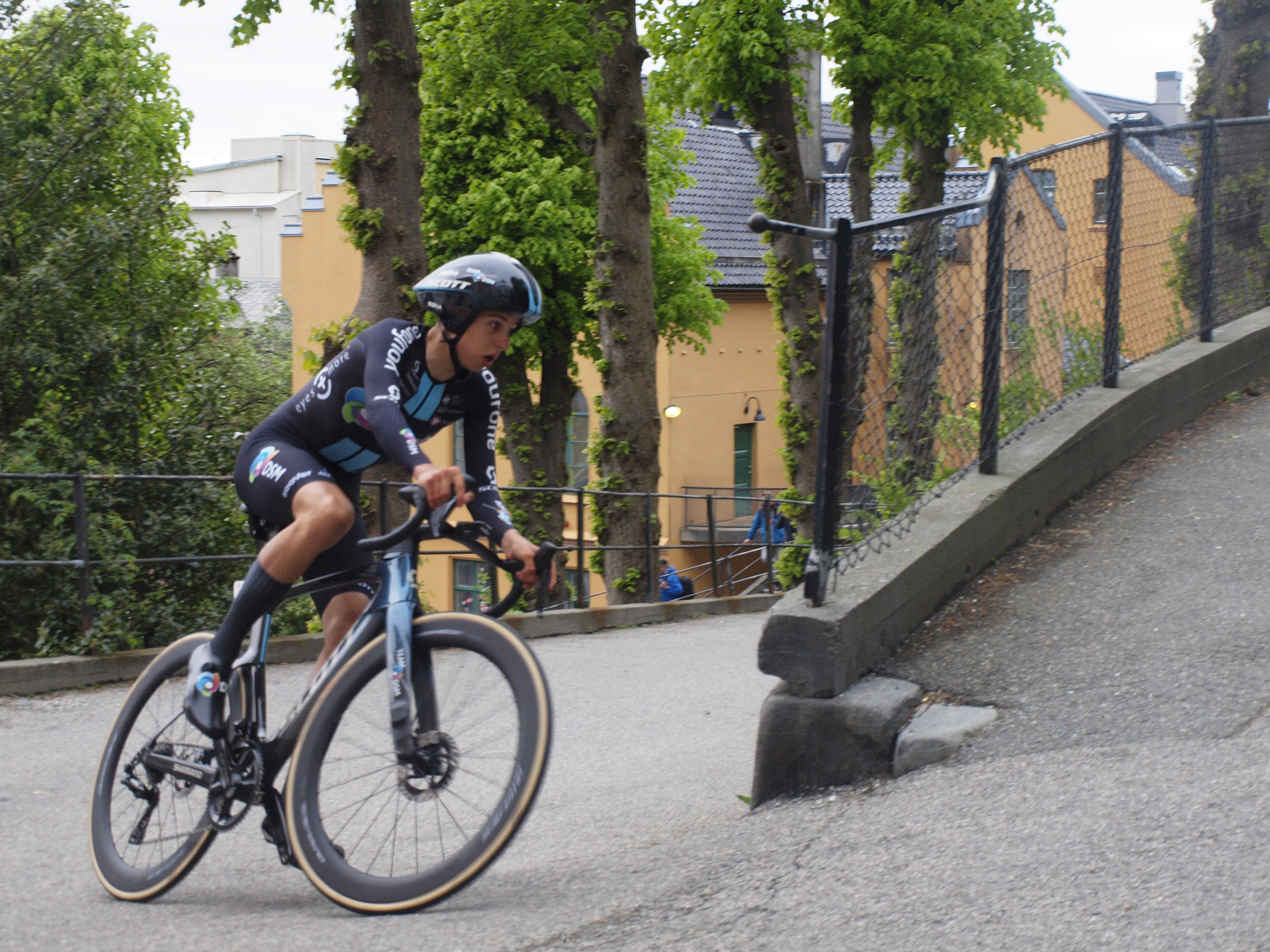
- Brenner at the 2023 Tour of Norway

Personal information
- Born: 27 August 2002 (age 24) Augsburg, Germany
- Height: 1.78 m (5 ft 10 in)
- Weight: 59 kg (130 lb)

Cycling career
- Sport: Cycling
- Current team: Tudor Pro Cycling Team
- Disciplines: Road and cyclocross
- Role: Rider
- Rider type: Stage racer, Time trialist

Amateur team
- 2018–2020: Team Auto Eder Bayern

Professional teams
- 2021–2023: Team DSM
- 2024–: Tudor Pro Cycling Team

Major wins
- Grand Tours Vuelta a España 1 individual stage (2026) Stage races Tour de Pologne (2026) One-day races and Classics National Road Race Championships (2024)
Medal record
Representing Germany
Men's road bicycle racing
World Championships
Silver medal – second place	2024 Zurich	Mixed team relay
Bronze medal – third place	2019 Yorkshire	Junior time trial
European Championships
Silver medal – second place	2020 Plouay	Junior time trial

Marco Brenner (born 27 August 2002) is a German professional racing cyclist, who currently rides for UCI ProTeam Tudor Pro Cycling Team.

== Major results ==
=== Road ===
2019
National Junior Championships

1st Time trial
1st Road race

1st Overall Tour du Pays de Vaud

1st Young rider classification
1st Prologue, Stages 1 & 2a

1st Overall Oberösterreich Juniorenrundfahrt

1st Young rider classification
1st Mountains classification
1st Stage 3

1st GP Général Patton
2nd Overall LVM Saarland Trofeo

1st Young rider classification
1st Stage 3b (TTT)

3rd Time trial, UCI World Junior Championships
3rd Trofeo Emilio Paganessi
5th Road race, UEC European Junior Championships
5th Overall Course de la Paix Juniors

1st Young rider classification

7th GP Luxembourg
8th Overall Giro della Lunigiana

1st Points classification
1st Stages 1, 2b (ITT) & 4

2020
National Junior Championships

1st Time trial
1st Road race

UEC European Junior Championships

2nd Time trial
4th Road race

4th Overall Grand Prix Rüebliland

1st Stage 2b (ITT)

2023
10th Overall Tour of Norway
2024 (2 pro wins)
1st Road race, National Championships
1st Stage 1 Settimana Internazionale di Coppi e Bartali
2nd Team relay, UCI World Championships
4th Giro della Toscana
5th Overall Czech Tour

1st Young rider classification

5th Overall Tour of Norway
8th Overall Giro d'Abruzzo

1st Young rider classification

2025
2nd Ardèche Classic
6th Overall Giro d'Abruzzo
9th Overall Tour of Oman
2026 (2)
1st Overall Tour de Pologne

1st Points classification

1st Stage 14 Vuelta a España
4th Overall Tour Down Under
4th Overall Tour of Guangxi
4th Tour des Alpes-Maritimes

==== Grand Tour general classification results timeline ====
Grand Tour	2022
Giro d'Italia	—
Tour de France	—
Vuelta a España	74

Legend
—	Did not compete
DNF	Did not finish

=== Cyclo-cross ===
2017–2018
2nd National Debutants Championships
2018–2019
2nd National Junior Championships
2019–2020
1st National Junior Championships
