= Luke Lamperti =

American racing cyclist (born 2002)

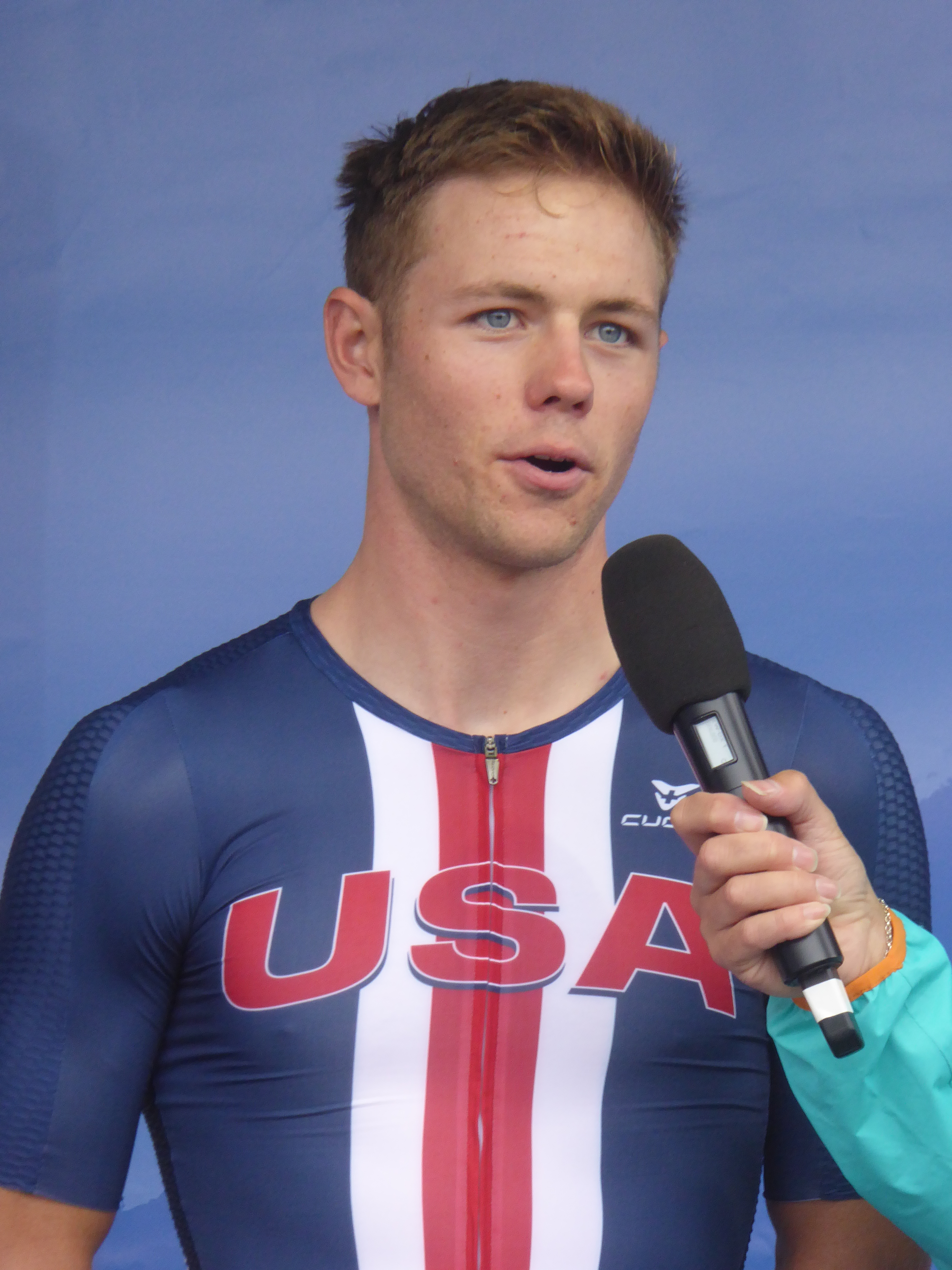
- Lamperti in 2023

Personal information
- Full name: Luciano Glenn Purdy Lamperti
- Born: December 31, 2002 (age 23) Sebastopol, California
- Height: 1.8 m (5 ft 11 in)
- Weight: 74 kg (163 lb)

Cycling career
- Sport: Cycling
- Current team: EF Education–EasyPost
- Discipline: Road
- Role: Rider

Amateur team
- 2018–2020: Lux–Strading p/b Specialized

Professional teams
- 2021–2023: Trinity Racing
- 2024–2025: Soudal–Quick-Step
- 2026–: EF Education–EasyPost

Luciano "Luke" Lamperti (born December 31, 2002) is an American road cyclist who currently rides for UCI WorldTeam EF Education–EasyPost.

On June 18, 2021, at the age of 18, Lamperti avoided several crashes in the final lap to take a surprise victory at the United States National Criterium Championships in Knoxville, Tennessee. In doing so, he became the youngest ever winner of the title. He competed in the under-23 road race at the 2021 UCI Road World Championships, where he originally finished 10th, but was disqualified afterwards by the UCI jury due to causing a Belgian rider to crash earlier in the race.

Lamperti had a successful 2023 season, winning the National Criterium Championships a second time as well as the Rutland–Melton CiCLE Classic and three stages of the Tour of Japan among other races. These results caught the attention of UCI WorldTeam Soudal–Quick-Step, who signed him for the following season on a two-year contract. In his first race with the team, he finished third at the Trofeo Ses Salines-Felanitx, followed up by a second place at the Muscat Classic two weeks later.

Lamperti switched teams to ride for EF Education–EasyPost beginning in 2026.

== Early life ==
Lamperti originally raced motocross before switching to cycling at age 11.

== Personal life ==
Lamperti's older brother, Gianni, is also a road cyclist, who won the 2019 United States National Junior Road Race Championships.

== Major results ==
2019
1st Mountains classification, Tour de l'Abitibi
1st Stage 2a Grand Prix Rüebliland
10th Paris–Roubaix Juniors
2021
1st National Criterium Championships
1st Stage 2 Tour d'Eure-et-Loir
2022 (1 pro win)
National Road Championships

1st Criterium
5th Road race

Tour Series

1st Stranraer

1st Lincoln GP
4th Overall Tour de Taiwan

1st Points classification
1st Stage 3

5th Youngster Coast Challenge
10th Dorpenomloop Rucphen
2023 (3)
1st National Criterium Championships
1st Rutland–Melton CiCLE Classic
Tour of Japan

1st Points classification
1st Stages 1 (ITT), 4 & 7

1st Stage 1 Volta ao Alentejo
1st Stage 3 Giro Next Gen
1st Stage 4 Circuit des Ardennes
3rd Overall Tour de Bretagne

1st Points classification
1st Stage 1

5th Youngster Coast Challenge
10th Clássica da Arrábida
2024 (1)
1st Stage 1 Czech Tour
2nd Muscat Classic
3rd Trofeo Ses Salines-Felanitx
4th Overall Deutschland Tour
6th Binche–Chimay–Binche
6th Tour of Leuven
7th Kuurne–Brussels–Kuurne
9th Münsterland Giro
2025
2nd Bredene Koksijde Classic
3rd Nokere Koerse
2026 (1)
1st Stage 1 Paris–Nice
5th Philadelphia Cycling Classic
9th Tour of Bruges
9th Flandrien 0.0 Classic
9th Kuurne–Brussels–Kuurne
10th Omloop Het Nieuwsblad

=== Grand Tour general classification results timeline ===
Grand Tour	2024
Giro d'Italia	117
Tour de France	–
Vuelta a España	–

Legend
—	Did not compete
DNF	Did not finish
