= Trinity Racing =

British cycling team

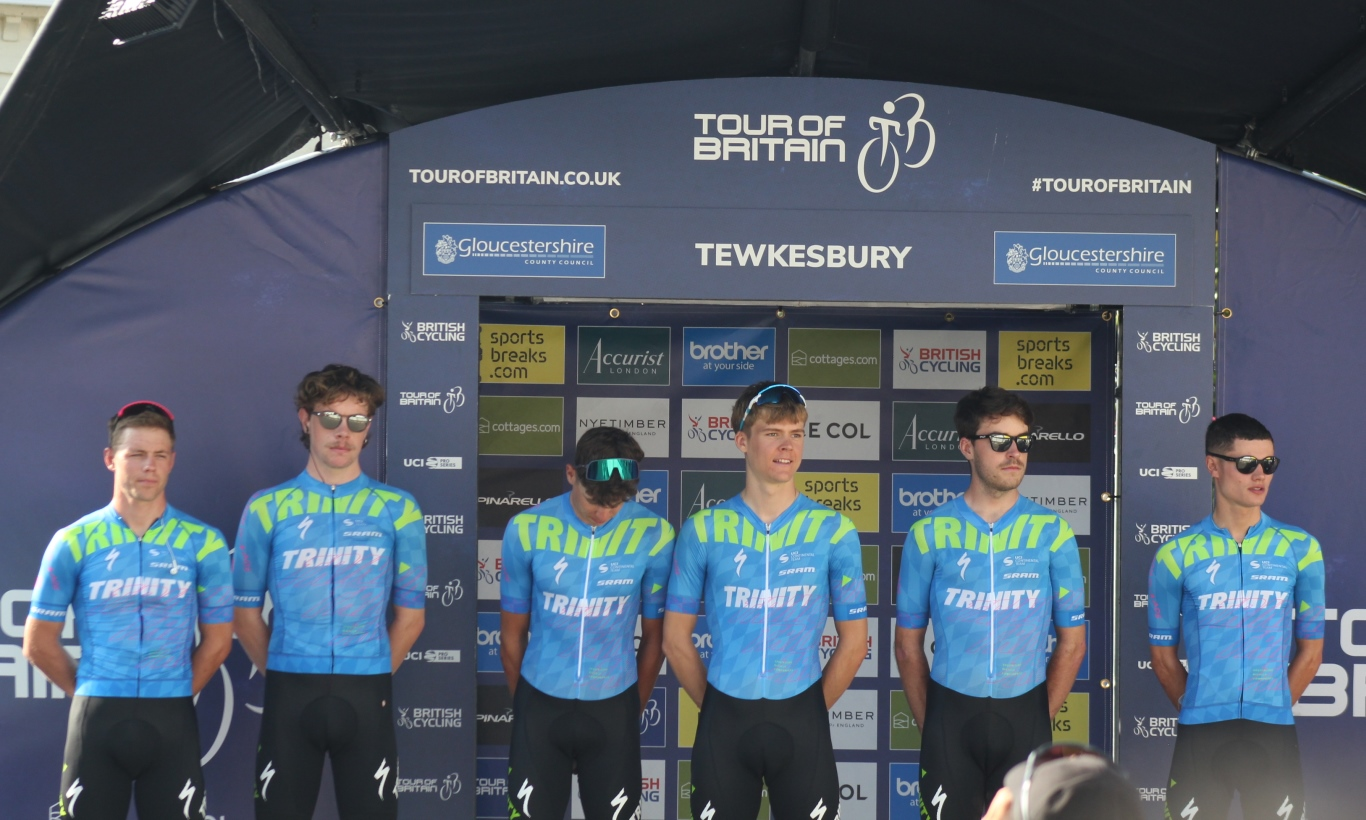

Team information
- UCI code: TRI
- Registered: United Kingdom
- Founded: 2018
- Disciplines: Road; Cyclo-cross; Mountain bike
- Status: UCI Cyclo-cross Team (2018–2023); UCI Continental Team (2021–2024); UCI MTB Team (2021–)
- Website: Team home page

Key personnel
- General manager: Andrew McQuaid

Team name history
- 2018–2020 2020–: TP Racing; Trinity Racing

Trinity Racing is a British multi-discipline cycling team, that has competed in road, cyclo-cross and mountain bike racing. It was founded in 2018 as a cyclo-cross team, before expanding into road cycling in 2020, and mountain biking in 2021. The road team closed down at the end of the 2024 season.

In 2025, a new mountain bike team serving as a development team for Specialized Factory Racing was launched. The six rider squad includes the former UCI junior and under-23 XCO world champion Line Burquier.

== Team roster ==
=== Mountain biking ===
As of 22 February 2025.

Rider	Date of birth
Lauren Aggeler (USA)	4 March 2004 (age 22)
Line Burquier (FRA)	7 May 2003 (age 23)
Coran Carrick-Anderson (GBR)	9 January 2003 (age 23)
Henry Coote (USA)	16 January 2006 (age 20)
Daniel English (USA)	24 February 2005 (age 21)
Vida Lopez de San Roman (USA)	23 January 2006 (age 20)

== Major wins ==
=== Road ===
2020
Overall Giro Ciclistico d'Italia, Tom Pidcock

Stages 4, 7, & 8, Tom Pidcock

Stage 5 Ronde de l'Isard, Ben Healy
2021
Stage 2 Tour d'Eure-et-Loir, Luke Lamperti
Stage 10 Giro Ciclistico d'Italia, Ben Healy
2022
Tour de Taiwan

Points classification, Luke Lamperti
Stage 3, Luke Lamperti

2023
Stage 1 Volta ao Alentejo, Luke Lamperti
Stage 4 Circuit des Ardennes, Luke Lamperti
Rutland–Melton CiCLE Classic, Luke Lamperti
Stage 1 Tour de Bretagne, Luke Lamperti
Tour of Japan

Stages 1, 4, & 7, Luke Lamperti
Points classification, Luke Lamperti
Young rider classification, Liam Johnston

Giro Next Gen

Stage 3, Luke Lamperti
Stage 5, Lukas Nerurkar
Points classification, Luke Lamperti

2024
Stage 5 Ronde de l'Isard, Joe Pidcock
Stage 1 Tour de l’Ain, Fergus Browning

=== Cyclo-cross ===
2020
Superprestige Gavere, Tom Pidcock
2021
National Trophy Clanfield, Cameron Mason
National Trophy Gravesend, Cameron Mason
UCI World Cup Dendermonde U23, Cameron Mason
2022
National Trophy Falkirk, Cameron Mason

=== Mountain biking ===
2021
UCI XCO World Cup Snowshoe, Christopher Blevins
2025
Internacionales Chelva U23, Vida Lopez de San Roman
Santa Susana U23, Vida Lopez de San Roman

== National and world champions ==
2019
Great Britain Cyclo-cross, Tom Pidcock
World Championships Cyclo-cross U23, Tom Pidcock
2020
Great Britain Cyclo-cross, Tom Pidcock
Ireland Road Race, Ben Healy
Ireland Time Trial U23, Ben Healy
2021
United States Criterium, Luke Lamperti
World Championships XCC MTB, Christopher Blevins
2022
United States Criterium, Luke Lamperti
2023
Great Britain Cyclo-cross, Cameron Mason
United States Criterium, Luke Lamperti
2024
Australia U23 Road Race, Fergus Browning
