= Lars Craps =

Belgian cyclist (born 2001)

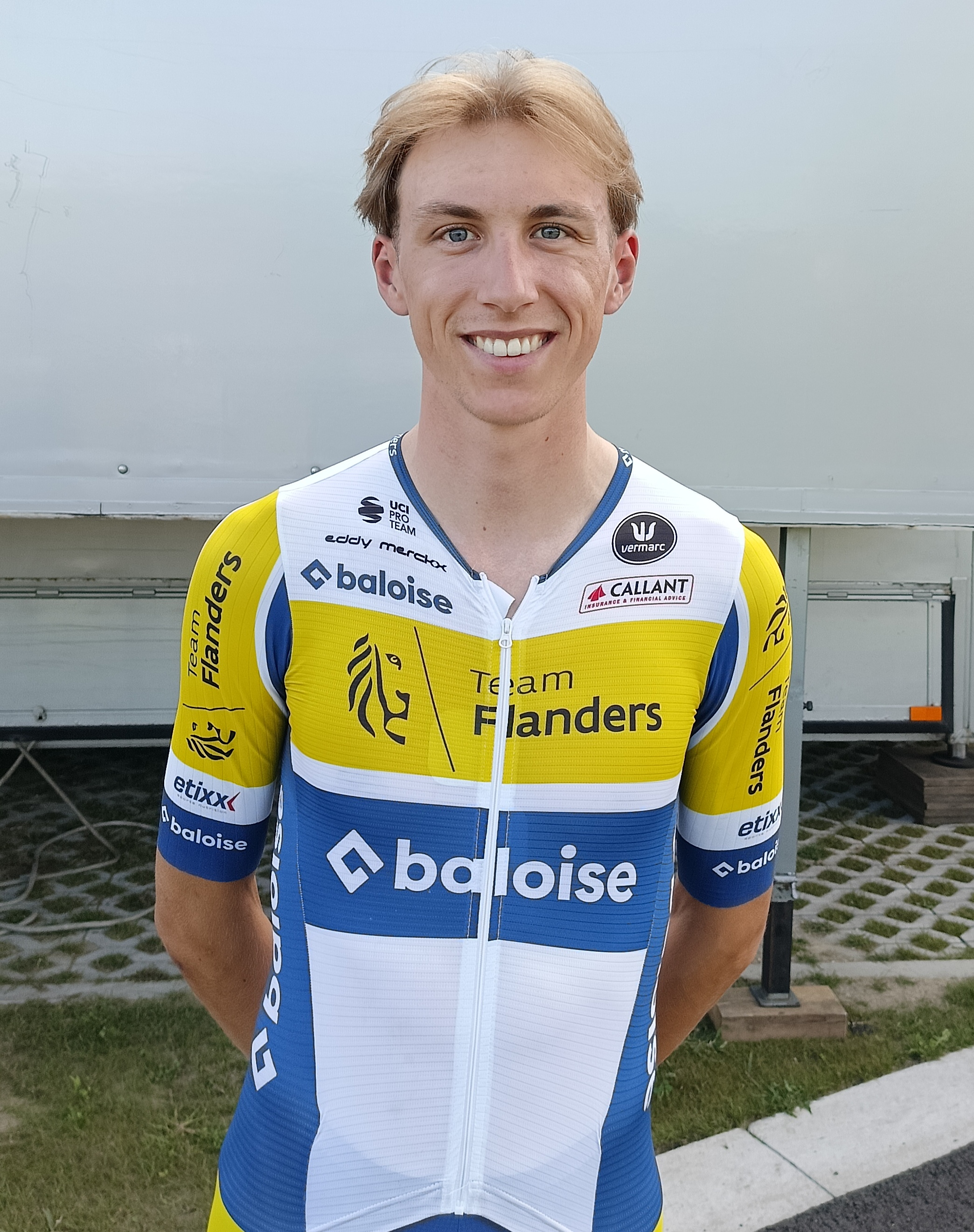
- Lars Craps at Renewi Tour 2024

Personal information
- Born: 17 October 2001 (age 24) Aalst, Belgium
- Height: 1.84 m (6 ft 0 in)
- Weight: 67 kg (148 lb)

Cycling career
- Sport: Cycling
- Current team: Lotto–Intermarché
- Discipline: Road
- Role: Rider

Amateur teams
- 2018: Wim Ruelens Olympia Tienen
- 2019: Brain² Olympia Tienen
- 2020–2022: Urbano Cycling Team

Professional teams
- 2023: Soudal–Quick-Step Devo Team
- 2024: Team Flanders–Baloise
- 2025–: Lotto

Lars Craps (born 17 October 2001) is a Belgian cyclist, who currently rides for UCI WorldTeam Lotto–Intermarché.

== Major results ==
2021
1st GP de Kroon
1st Stage 2 (TTT) Tour de Moselle
3rd Overall Arden Challenge
2022
3rd La Get Up Cup
4th Overall Arden Challenge
8th Overall Tour de Namur
9th Overall Triptyque Ardennais
2023
3rd Grote Prijs Jules Van Hevel
7th Overall Tour Alsace

=== Grand Tour general classification results timeline ===
Grand Tour	2025
Giro d'Italia	—
Tour de France	—
Vuelta a España	57

Legend
—	Did not compete
DNF	Did not finish
