= 2024 UCI Road World Championships – Men's under-23 road race =

Cycling race

Men's under-23 road race
2024 UCI Road World Championships

Race details
- Dates: 27 September 2024
- Stages: 1 in Zurich, Switzerland
- Distance: 173.6 km (107.9 mi)
- Winning time: 3h 57' 24"

Medalists
	Gold	(Germany) Niklas Behrens (GER)
	Silver	(Slovakia) Martin Svrček (SVK)
	Bronze	(Belgium) Alec Segaert (BEL)

The men's under-23 road race of the 2024 UCI Road World Championships was a cycling event that took place on 27 September 2024 in Zurich, Switzerland. German cyclist Niklas Behrens won the race.

== Continental champions ==
Name	Country	Reason
Axel Laurance	France	Incumbent World Champion
Renus Uhiriwe Byiza	Rwanda	African Champion
Abdulla Jasim Al-Ali	United Arab Emirates	Asian Champion
Huub Artz	Netherlands	European Champion
Matthew Greenwood	Australia	Oceanian Champion
Otavio Augusto Gonzeli	Brazil	Panamerican Champion

== Final classification ==
Rank	Rider	Country	Time
1	Niklas Behrens	Germany	3h 57' 24"
2	Martin Svrček	Slovakia	s.t.
3	Alec Segaert	Belgium	+ 28"
4	Jan Christen	Switzerland	+ 39"
5	Joseph Blackmore	Great Britain	+ 46"
6	Isaac del Toro	Mexico	s.t.
7	Jarno Widar	Belgium	+ 50"
8	Tibor Del Grosso	Netherlands	+ 1' 25"
9	Iván Romeo	Spain	+ 2' 27"
10	Igor Arrieta	Spain	+ 2' 45"
11	Giulio Pellizzari	Italy	s.t.
12	Darren Rafferty	Ireland	+ 2' 48"
13	Fabio Christen	Switzerland	+ 4' 43"
14	Arno Wallenborn	Luxembourg	s.t.
15	Emiel Verstrynge	Belgium	s.t.
16	Emil Herzog	Germany	s.t.
17	William Junior Lecerf	Belgium	s.t.
18	Menno Huising	Netherlands	s.t.
19	Simon Dalby	Denmark	+ 4' 46"
20	António Morgado	Portugal	+ 4' 56"
21	Francesco Busatto	Italy	+ 5' 05"
22	Daniel Lima	Portugal	s.t.
23	Nicolas Vinokurov	Kazakhstan	s.t.
24	Johannes Kulset	Norway	s.t.
25	Colby Simmons	United States	s.t.
26	Ewen Costiou	France	s.t.
27	Pablo Torres	Spain	s.t.
28	Embret Svestad-Bårdseng	Norway	+ 5' 15"
29	Robin Orins	Belgium	+ 5' 52"
30	Iker Mintegi	Spain	+ 7' 53"
31	Tim Torn Teutenberg	Germany	+ 10' 54"
32	Rasmus Søjberg Pedersen	Denmark	+ 11' 10"
33	Fabian Weiss	Switzerland	+ 12' 13"
34	Callum Thornley	Great Britain	s.t.
35	Aaron Dockx	Belgium	s.t.
36	Julian Borresch	Germany	s.t.
37	Thibaud Gruel	France	s.t.
38	Darren van Bekkum	Netherlands	s.t.
39	Jørgen Nordhagen	Norway	s.t.
40	Pierre Thierry	France	+ 13' 33"
41	Morten Nørtoft	Denmark	s.t.
42	Eirik Vang Aas	Norway	+ 14' 54"
43	Travis Stedman	South Africa	s.t.
44	Ole Theiler	Germany	s.t.
45	Gal Glivar	Slovenia	+ 15' 43"
46	Lewis Bower	New Zealand	s.t.
47	Axel Källberg	Finland	s.t.
48	Egor Igoshev	Individual Neutral Athletes	s.t.
49	Sebastian Putz	Austria	s.t.
50	Matyáš Kopecký	Czech Republic	s.t.
51	Mateusz Gajdulewicz	Poland	s.t.
52	Andrey Remkhe	Kazakhstan	s.t.
53	Fergus Browning	Australia	s.t.
54	Andrii Ponomar	Ukraine	s.t.
55	Frank Aron Ragilo	Estonia	s.t.
56	Ciro Pérez Álvarez	Uruguay	s.t.
57	Carlos Alfonso Garcia	Mexico	s.t.
58	Cesar Macias	Mexico	s.t.
59	Filip Gruszczynski	Poland	s.t.
60	Richard Riška	Slovakia	s.t.
61	Jose Manuel Aramayo	Bolivia	s.t.
62	Arnaud Tendon	Switzerland	s.t.
63	Lucas Lopes	Portugal	s.t.
64	Kasper Andersen	Denmark	s.t.
65	Mauricio Zapata	Colombia	s.t.
66	Koki Kamada	Japan	s.t.
67	Mathieu Kockelmann	Luxembourg	s.t.
68	Gavin Hlady	United States	s.t.
69	Alejandro Granados Bonilla	Costa Rica	s.t.
70	Gonçalo Tavares	Portugal	s.t.
71	Pedri Crause	South Africa	s.t.
72	Carl Kagevi	Sweden	s.t.
73	Marco Schrettl	Austria	s.t.
74	Philipp Hofbauer	Austria	s.t.
75	Vicente Rojas Naranjo	Chile	s.t.
76	Alexandre Kess	Luxembourg	s.t.
77	Michael Leonard	Canada	s.t.
78	Luke Tuckwell	Australia	s.t.
79	Pietro Mattio	Italy	s.t.
80	William Colorado	Colombia	s.t.
81	Wessel Mouris	Netherlands	+ 17' 40"
82	Noa Isidore	France	+ 18' 01"
83	Henrik Pedersen	Denmark	+ 19' 55"
84	Cole Kessler	United States	s.t.
85	Kiya Rogora	Ethiopia	+ 19' 57"
86	Kristians Belohvosciks	Latvia	+ 20' 24"
87	Jonas Walton	Canada	s.t.
88	Jakob Söderqvist	Sweden	s.t.
89	Edvin Lovidius	Sweden	s.t.
90	Jamie Meehan	Ireland	s.t.
91	Liam O'Brien	Ireland	s.t.
92	Aivaras Mikutis	Lithuania	s.t.
93	Alexander Hajek	Austria	s.t.
94	Jaider Muñoz	Colombia	+ 21' 41"
95	José Ramón Muñiz	Mexico	+ 24' 23"
96	Jonas Kind Høydahl	Norway	+ 24' 50"
97	Emil Iwersen	Denmark	s.t.
98	Samet Bulut	Turkey	+ 25' 13"
99	Jaume Guardeño	Spain	+ 28' 06"
100	Mykhailo Basaraba	Ukraine	s.t.
101	Dylan Roberto Jiménez	Costa Rica	+ 30' 56"
102	Dean Harvey	Ireland	+ 33' 16"
103	Yafiet Mulugeta	Eritrea	s.t.

Rank	Rider	Country	Time
	Jaka Marolt	Slovenia	DNF
	Hector Quintana Vidal	Chile	DNF
	Victor Cesar de Paula	Brazil	DNF
	Otavio Augusto Gonzeli	Brazil	DNF
	Muhammad Syelhan	Indonesia	DNF
	Mattew-Denis Piciu	Romania	DNF
	Paul Lomulia	Uganda	DNF
	Serhii Sydor	Ukraine	DNF
	Adrià Regada Hierro	Andorra	DNF
	Davide De Pretto	Italy	DNF
	Matthew Brennan	Great Britain	DNF
	Artem Shmidt	United States	DNF
	Fran Miholjević	Croatia	DNF
	Robert Donaldson	Great Britain	DNF
	Louis Sutton	Great Britain	DNF
	Anže Ravbar	Slovenia	DNF
	Awet Aman	Eritrea	DNF
	Tomaš Přidal	Czech Republic	DNF
	Andrey Andre	Brazil	DNF
	Matthias Schwarzbacher	Slovakia	DNF
	Donovan Ramirez González	Costa Rica	DNF
	Ali Labib	Iran	DNF
	Kieran Gordge	South Africa	DNF
	Yoshiki Terada	Japan	DNF
	Emir Uzun	Turkey	DNF
	Emanuel Castro Esquivel	Costa Rica	DNF
	Nikiforos Arvanitou	Greece	DNF
	Arlex Jose Mendez Carrero	Venezuela	DNF
	Dominik Dunár	Slovakia	DNF
	Quentin Cowan	Canada	DNF
	Samuel Niyonkuru	Rwanda	DNF
	Brieuc Rolland	France	DNF
	Mats Wenzel	Luxembourg	DNF
	Mil Morang	Luxembourg	DNF
	Jeferson Ruiz	Colombia	DNF
	Oliver Stockwell	Great Britain	DNF
	Clement Izquierdo	France	DNF
	Emry Faingezicht	Israel	DNF
	Alastair Mackellar	Australia	DNF
	David Elias Rico Barraza	Mexico	DNF
	Markus Mäeuibo	Estonia	DNF
	Márkó Tóth	Hungary	DNF
	Noé Ury	Luxembourg	DNF
	Muhammad Andy Royan	Indonesia	DNF
	Aurélien de Comarmond	Mauritius	DNF
	Ilian Alexandre Barhoumi	Switzerland	DNF
	Andrew August	United States	DNF
	Kacper Gieryk	Poland	DNF
	Lawrence Lorot	Uganda	DNF
	Jhoffre Imbaquingo Benavides	Ecuador	DNF
	Maxim Konkin	Kazakhstan	DNF
	Fu Enqi	China	DNF
	Kaan Soylu Özkalbim	Turkey	DNF
	Sun Changsheng	China	DNF
	Anderson Palma Chaucanes	Ecuador	DNF
	Samuel Novak	Slovakia	DNF
	Daniil Yakovlev	Ukraine	DNF
	Josué Hurtado	El Salvador	DNF
	Li Zhen	China	DNF
	Nicholas Narraway	Bermuda	DNF
	Dillon Geary	South Africa	DNF
	Alexandre Montez	Portugal	DNF
	Mohammad Almutaiwei	United Arab Emirates	DNF
	Nasrallah Mohamed Aissa Essemiani	Algeria	DNF
	Daniel Vysočan	Czech Republic	DNF
	Huub Artz	Netherlands	DNF
	Jérémie La Grenade	Canada	DNF
	Mewael Girmay	Eritrea	DNF
	Nahom Araya	Eritrea	DNF
	Pavel Novák	Czech Republic	DNF
	Florian Kajamini	Italy	DNF
	Vainqueur Masengesho	Rwanda	DNF
	Bachir Chennafi	Algeria	DNF
	Mohamed Aziz Dellai	Tunisia	DNF
	Wilson Sanon	Haiti	DNF
	Diego Lei Godoy	Venezuela	DNF
	Rudolf Remkhi	Kazakhstan	DNF
	Abdulla Jasimal-Ali	United Arab Emirates	DNF
	Nikita Tsvetkov	Uzbekistan	DNF
	Aklilu Gebretinsae	Eritrea	DNF
	Etienne Tuyizere	Rwanda	DNS
