= UCI ProSeries =

Series of professional road cycling races

- Current season, competition or edition: 2026 UCI ProSeries
- Sport: Road bicycle racing
- Founded: 2020
- Country: Europe, Asia, Argentina and United States

The UCI ProSeries is the second tier men's elite road cycling tour. It was inaugurated in 2020. The series is placed below the UCI World Tour, but above the various regional UCI Continental Circuits.

== Development ==
In December 2018, the UCI announced various reforms to the structure and organisation of men's professional road racing. One of the major changes is the introduction of a new division of races called the UCI ProSeries. With the introduction of the ProSeries, the UCI .HC road races disappeared from the calendar. In October 2019, the UCI published the 2020 UCI International Road Calendar, including the ProSeries. The inaugural season of the ProSeries was planned to include 57 events, which were formerly World Tour, .HC or .1 events, but many were cancelled due to the worldwide COVID-19 pandemic of 2020–21.

== Team participation ==
In events of the ProSeries, UCI WorldTeams may participate, up to a maximum of 70% in European races and 65% in other races. The rest of the teams participating may be UCI ProTeams, UCI Continental teams, or National teams.

== Events ==
The inaugural UCI ProSeries calendar consisted of 57 events, of which 30 were one-day races (1.Pro) and 27 were stage races (2.Pro). Due to the COVID-19 pandemic, multiple events were cancelled, postponed or introduced in both 2020 and 2021 and the ProSeries calendar has been revised several times. The calendar features events in 21 countries on 4 continents: Australia, Belgium, China, Czech Republic, Denmark, France, Germany, Great Britain, Hungary, Italy, Japan, Luxembourg, Malaysia, Norway, Oman, Portugal, Saudi Arabia, Slovenia, Spain, Turkey and United States.

== Winners by race ==
Year	2020	2021	2022	2023	2024	2025	2026
(Argentina) **Vuelta a San Juan**	(Belgium) Evenepoel (1/13)	Cancelled		(Colombia) MÁ López (2/2)	Not on calendar
(Saudi Arabia) **AlUla Tour**	Part of UCI Asia Tour						(Switzerland) Christen
(Australia) **Surf Coast Classic**	Part of UCI Oceania Tour	Cancelled	Not on calendar		Part of UCI Oceania Tour		Cancelled
(Spain) **Volta a la Comunitat Valenciana**	(Slovenia) Pogačar (1/7)	(Switzerland) Küng	(Russia) Vlasov (2/2)	(Portugal) Costa (1/2)	(United States) McNulty (2/5)	(Colombia) Buitrago (1/2)	(Belgium) Evenepoel (13/13)
(Oman) **Muscat Classic**	Not on calendar			Part of UCI Asia Tour			(Switzerland) Schmid (2/2)
**Tour of Oman**	Cancelled		(Czech Republic) Hirt	(United States) Jorgenson	(United Kingdom) A Yates (2/3)	(United Kingdom) A Yates (3/3)	(Italy) Scaroni
(Portugal) **Figueira Champions Classic**	Not on calendar			Part of UCI Europe Tour	(Belgium) Evenepoel (10/13)	(Portugal) Morgado (1/2)	(Portugal) Morgado (2/2)
(Spain) **Clásica de Almería**	(Germany) Ackermann (1/3)	(Italy) Nizzolo (1/2)	(Norway) Kristoff (1/3)	(Italy) Moschetti	(Netherlands) Kooij (4/5)	(Belgium) Fretin	(Eritrea) Girmay (2/2)
(France) **Tour de la Provence**	(Colombia) Quintana (1/2)	(Colombia) Sosa (1/2)	(Colombia) Quintana (2/2)	Cancelled	Part of UCI Europe Tour
(Portugal) **Volta ao Algarve**	(Belgium) Evenepoel (2/13)	(Portugal) Rodrigues	(Belgium) Evenepoel (8/13)	(Colombia) D Martínez (2/2)	(Belgium) Evenepoel (11/13)	(Denmark) Vingegaard (2/2)	(Spain) Ayuso (4/4)
(Spain) **Vuelta a Andalucía**	(Denmark) Fuglsang	(Colombia) MÁ López (1/2)	(Netherlands) Poels (1/2)	(Slovenia) Pogačar (5/7)	No winner	(France) Sivakov (2/2)	(Spain) Romeo
(France) **Faun-Ardèche Classic**	(France) Cavagna	(France) Gaudu	(United States) McNulty (1/5)	(France) Alaphilippe (2/2)	(Spain) Ayuso (1/4)	(France) Grégoire (2/4)	(France) Seixas
(Belgium) **Kuurne-Brussels-Kuurne**	(Denmark) Asgreen	(Denmark) M Pedersen (1/3)	(Netherlands) Jakobsen (2/2)	(Belgium) Benoot	(Belgium) van Aert (4/5)	(Belgium) Philipsen (5/8)	(United Kingdom) Brennan (3/3)
(France) **Drôme Classic**	(Australia) Clarke	(Italy) Bagioli (1/2)	(Denmark) Vingegaard (1/2)	(France) Perez	(Switzerland) Hirschi (4/6)	(Spain) Ayuso (2/4)	(France) Grégoire (4/4)
(Italy) **Trofeo Laigueglia**	(Italy) Ciccone	(Netherlands) Mollema	(Slovenia) Polanc	(France) Peters	(France) L Martinez (2/3)	(Spain) Ayuso (3/4)	(Colombia) Buitrago (2/2)
(Belgium) **Nokere Koerse**	Cancelled	(Belgium) Robeet	(Belgium) Merlier (3/10)	(Belgium) Merlier (4/10)	(Belgium) Merlier (6/10)	(Netherlands) Eekhoff	(Belgium) Philipsen (7/8)
(Italy) **Milano–Torino**	(France) Démare (1/6)	(Slovenia) Roglič (2/4)	(United Kingdom) Cavendish (2/2)	(Netherlands) de Kleijn (1/3)	(Italy) Bettiol (1/2)	(Mexico) del Toro (1/8)	(United Kingdom) Pidcock (2/3)
(France) **GP de Denain**	Cancelled	(Belgium) Philipsen (2/8)	(Germany) Walscheid	(Colombia) Molano	(Germany) Steimle	(United Kingdom) Brennan (1/3)	(Belgium) Segaert
(Belgium) **Bredene Koksijde Classic**	Cancelled	(Belgium) Merlier (2/10)	(Germany) Ackermann (2/3)	(Belgium) Thijssen	(Italy) Mozzato	(Belgium) Theuns	(Netherlands) Groenewegen
(Spain) **GP Miguel Induráin**	Cancelled	(Spain) Valverde	(France) Barguil	(Spain) I Izagirre (1/2)	(United States) McNulty (3/5)	(Belgium) Nys (2/2)	(Spain) I Izagirre (2/2)
(France) **Région Pays de la Loire Tour**	Part of UCI Europe Tour						(France) L'Hote
(Belgium) **Scheldeprijs**	(Australia) Ewan (1/2)	(Belgium) Philipsen (1/8)	(Norway) Kristoff (2/3)	(Belgium) Philipsen (3/8)	(Belgium) Merlier (7/10)	(Belgium) Merlier (8/10)	(Belgium) Merlier (10/10)
(Belgium) **Brabantse Pijl**	(France) Alaphilippe (1/2)	(United Kingdom) Pidcock (1/3)	(United States) Sheffield	(France) Godon (1/4)	(France) Cosnefroy (1/6)	(Belgium) Evenepoel (12/13)	(Denmark) Foldager
(China) **Tour of Hainan**	Not on calendar			(Spain) Sevilla	(New Zealand) Gate (1/2)	(Ukraine) Tsarenko	(Uruguay) Silva (2/2)
(Italy) **Tour of the Alps**	Cancelled	(United Kingdom) S Yates	(France) Bardet	(United Kingdom) Geoghegan Hart	(Spain) JP López	(Australia) Storer	(Italy) Pellizzari
**Presidential Tour of Turkey**	Cancelled	(Spain) Díaz	(New Zealand) Bevin	Part of UCI Europe Tour	(Netherlands) van den Broek	(Netherlands) Poels (2/2)	(Australia) Berwick
(France) **GP du Morbihan**	Cancelled	(Belgium) Marit	(France) Simon	(Belgium) De Lie (1/6)	(France) Cosnefroy (2/6)	(France) Cosnefroy (3/6)	(France) Cosnefroy (4/6)
(France) **Tro-Bro Léon**	Cancelled	(United Kingdom) Swift	(France) Hofstetter	(Italy) Nizzolo (2/2)	(Belgium) De Lie (3/6)	(France) Tronchon	(Italy) Fiorelli
(France) **Classique Dunkerque**	Not on calendar					(Germany) Ackermann (3/3)	(United States) Shmidt
(Hungary) **Tour de Hongrie**	Part of UCI Europe Tour			(Switzerland) Hirschi (1/6)	(Belgium) Nys (1/2)	(Ecuador) HM López	(Sweden) Söderqvist
(France) **4 Jours de Dunkerque**	Cancelled		(Belgium) Gilbert	(France) Grégoire (1/4)	(Republic of Ireland) S Bennett	(United Kingdom) Watson	(New Zealand) Pithie
**Tour of Norway**	Cancelled	(United Kingdom) Hayter	(Belgium) Evenepoel (9/13)	(United Kingdom) Tulett	(France) Laurance	(United Kingdom) Brennan (2/3)	Cancelled
(France) **Boucles de la Mayenne**	Cancelled	(France) Démare (3/6)	(France) Thomas	(Spain) Lazkano	(Italy) Bettiol (2/2)	(New Zealand) Gate (2/2)	(France) Cosnefroy (5/6)
**Tour of Slovenia**	Cancelled	(Slovenia) Pogačar (2/7)	(Slovenia) Pogačar (3/7)	(Italy) Zana	(Italy) Aleotti	(Norway) Johannessen	(Germany) Lipowitz
(Belgium) **Brussels Cycling Classic**	(Belgium) Merlier (1/10)	(Belgium) Evenepoel (6/13)	(Netherlands) van der Hoorn	(France) Démare (6/6)	(Norway) Abrahamsen (1/2)	(Belgium) Merlier (9/10)	(Belgium) Meeus (2/2)
(Netherlands) **ZLM Tour**	Cancelled		(Netherlands) Kooij (1/5)	(Netherlands) Kooij (3/5)	Part of UCI Europe Tour
(Belgium) **Dwars door het Hageland**	(Belgium) Rickaert	(Norway) Tiller (1/2)	(Netherlands) Riesebeek	(Norway) Tiller (2/2)	(Belgium) Vermeersch	(France) Magnier (1/2)	Part of UCI Europe Tour
(France) **Mont Ventoux Dénivelé Challenge**	Part of UCI Europe Tour			(France) L Martinez (1/3)	Not on calendar	Cancelled	Not on calendar
**Baloise Belgium Tour**	Cancelled	(Belgium) Evenepoel (4/13)	(Switzerland) Schmid (1/2)	(Netherlands) van der Poel (2/3)	(Norway) Wærenskjold (1/2)	(Italy) Baroncini (2/2)	(Belgium) Philipsen (5/8)
(China) **Tour of Qinghai Lake**	Part of UCI Asia Tour			(Eritrea) Mulubrhan (1/2)	(Ecuador) Cepeda	(Eritrea) Mulubrhan (2/2)	(Ecuador) Caicedo
(Belgium) **Tour de Wallonie**	(France) Démare (2/6)	(United States) Simmons (1/2)	(Australia) Stannard	(Italy) Ganna	(Italy) Trentin (1/2)	(New Zealand) Strong (2/4)	(New Zealand) Oliver
(Spain) **Vuelta a Burgos**	(Belgium) Evenepoel (3/13)	(Spain) Landa	(France) Sivakov (1/2)	(Slovenia) Roglič (3/4)	(United States) Kuss	(Mexico) del Toro (2/8)	(Austria) Gall
**Arctic Race of Norway**	Cancelled	(Belgium) Hermans	(Norway) Leknessund	(United Kingdom) Williams (1/2)	(Denmark) Cort (1/2)	(New Zealand) Strong (3/4)	(Uruguay) Silva (2/2)
(Denmark) **Danmark Rundt**	Cancelled	(Belgium) Evenepoel (5/13)	(France) Laporte (2/3)	(Denmark) M Pedersen (2/4)	(Belgium) De Lie (4/6)	(Denmark) M Pedersen (4/4)	(Belgium) van Aert (5/5)
(Belgium) **Circuit Franco-Belge**	Cancelled	(Netherlands) Jakobsen (1/2)	(Norway) Kristoff (3/3)	(Belgium) De Lie (2/6)	(Eritrea) Girmay (1/2)	(Norway) Abrahamsen (2/2)	(New Zealand) Strong (4/4)
(Italy) **Gran Trittico Lombardo**	(Spain) G Izagirre	Not on calendar
(Czech Republic) **Czech Tour**	Part of UCI Europe Tour						(United States) August
(Germany) **Deutschland Tour**	Cancelled	(Germany) Politt	(United Kingdom) A Yates (1/3)	(Belgium) Van Wilder (1/2)	(Denmark) M Pedersen (3/4)	(Norway) Wærenskjold (2/2)	(Mexico) del Toro (8/8)
(United States) **Maryland Cycling Classic**	Cancelled		(Belgium) Vanmarcke	(Denmark) Skjelmose (2/2)	Cancelled	(France) Dujardin	Cancelled
(United Kingdom) **Tour of Britain**	Cancelled	(Belgium) van Aert (1/5)	(Spain) Serrano (1/2)	(Belgium) van Aert (2/5)	(United Kingdom) Williams (2/2)	(France) Grégoire (3/4)	(Belgium) Wellens
(Italy) **GP Industria & Artigianato**	Cancelled	(Belgium) Vansevenant	(Italy) Ulissi (2/2)	(Republic of Ireland) Healy	(Switzerland) Hirschi (5/6)	(Mexico) del Toro (3/8)	(United Kingdom) Pidcock (3/3)
(Italy) **Coppa Sabatini**	(New Zealand) Smith	(Denmark) Valgren	(Colombia) D Martínez (1/2)	(Switzerland) Hirschi (2/6)	(Switzerland) Hirschi (6/6)	(Mexico) del Toro (4/8)	(France) Cosnefroy (6/6)
(France) **GP de Fourmies**	Cancelled	(Italy) Viviani	(Australia) Ewan (2/2)	(Belgium) Merlier (5/10)	(Netherlands) de Kleijn (2/3)	(France) Magnier (2/2)	(Netherlands) de Kleijn (3/3)
(Belgium) **GP de Wallonie**	Cancelled	(France) Laporte (1/3)	(Netherlands) van der Poel (1/3)	(Spain) Serrano (2/2)	(Spain) Adrià	(Belgium) De Lie (5/6)	(France) Sparfel
(Belgium) **Super 8 Classic**	Cancelled	(France) Sénéchal	(Belgium) Meeus (1/2)	(Netherlands) van der Poel (3/3)	(Italy) Baroncini (1/2)	(Belgium) De Lie (6/6)	(Denmark) H Pedersen
**Tour de Luxembourg**	(Italy) Ulissi (1/2)	(Portugal) Almeida	(Denmark) Skjelmose (1/2)	(Switzerland) Hirschi (3/6)	(Italy) Tiberi	(United States) McNulty (4/5)	(Italy) Piganzoli (1/2)
(Germany) **Münsterland Giro**	Cancelled	(United Kingdom) Cavendish (1/2)	(Netherlands) Kooij (2/5)	(Norway) Hagenes (1/2)	(Belgium) Philipsen (4/8)	(Belgium) Philipsen (6/8)	(Netherlands) Kooij (5/5)
(Malaysia) **Tour de Langkawi**	(Italy) Celano	Cancelled	(Colombia) Sosa (2/2)	(United Kingdom) Carr	(United Kingdom) Poole	(France) Delbove	(Germany) Jasch
(Italy) **Giro dell'Emilia**	(Russia) Vlasov (1/2)	(Slovenia) Roglič (1/4)	(Spain) Mas	(Slovenia) Roglič (4/4)	(Slovenia) Pogačar (6/7)	(Mexico) del Toro (5/8)	(Italy) Piganzoli (2/2)
(Italy) **Coppa Bernocchi**	Cancelled	(Belgium) Evenepoel (7/13)	(Italy) Ballerini	(Belgium) van Aert (3/5)	(Belgium) Van Tricht	(France) Godon (3/4)	(France) Isidore
(Italy) **Tre Valli Varesine**	Cancelled	(Italy) De Marchi	(Slovenia) Pogačar (4/7)	(Belgium) Van Wilder (2/2)	Cancelled	(Slovenia) Pogačar (7/7)	(Belgium) Widar
(Italy) **Gran Piemonte**	(New Zealand) G Bennett	(United Kingdom) Walls	(Spain) García Cortina	(Italy) Bagioli (2/2)	(United States) Powless (2/3)	(Mexico) del Toro (6/8)	(France) Godon (4/4)
(China) **Tour of Taihu Lake**	Not on calendar			(New Zealand) Jackson	(Netherlands) Krijnsen	(Italy) Malucelli	Part of UCI Asia Tour
(France) **Paris–Tours**	(Denmark) C Pedersen	(France) Démare (4/6)	(France) Démare (5/6)	(United States) Sheehan	(France) Laporte (3/3)	(Italy) Trentin (2/2)	(Norway) Hagenes (2/2)
(Italy) **Giro del Veneto**	Not on calendar	Part of UCI Europe Tour		(France) Godon (2/4)	(New Zealand) Strong (1/4)	(Mexico) del Toro (7/8)	(Italy) Covi
**Japan Cup**	Cancelled		(United States) Powless (1/3)	(Portugal) Costa (2/2)	(United States) Powless (3/3)	(France) L Martinez (3/3)	(United States) Simmons (2/2)
(Italy) **Veneto Classic**	Not on calendar	Part of UCI Europe Tour		(Italy) Formolo	(Denmark) Cort (2/2)	(Norway) Løland	(United States) McNulty (5/5)

=== Most race wins ===
Riders in bold are still active.

Rank	Cyclist	Total	Stage-race	One-day	Years
1.	(Belgium) **Remco Evenepoel**	13	9	4	2020-2026
2.	(Belgium) **Tim Merlier**	10	0	10	2020-2026
3.	(Mexico) **Isaac del Toro**	8	2	6	2025-2026
3.	(Belgium) **Jasper Philipsen**	8	1	7	2021-2026
5.	(Slovenia) **Tadej Pogačar**	7	4	3	2020-2025
6.	(France) **Benoît Cosnefroy**	6	1	5	2024-2026
6.	(Belgium) **Arnaud De Lie**	6	1	5	2023-2025
6.	(France) Arnaud Démare	6	2	4	2020-2023
6.	(Switzerland) **Marc Hirschi**	6	2	4	2023-2024
10.	(Netherlands) **Olav Kooij**	5	2	3	2022-2026
10.	(United States) **Brandon McNulty**	5	2	3	2022-2026
10.	(Belgium) **Wout van Aert**	5	3	2	2021-2026
13.	(Spain) **Juan Ayuso**	4	1	3	2024-2026
13.	(France) **Godon**	4	4	0	2023-2026
13.	(France) **Romain Grégoire**	4	2	2	2023-2026
13.	(Denmark) **Mads Pedersen**	4	3	1	2021-2025
13.	(Slovenia) **Primož Roglič**	4	1	3	2021-2023
13.	(New Zealand) **Corbin Strong**	4	1	3	2024-2026

=== Race wins by country ===
Rank	Nation	Wins	Riders
1.	Belgium	64	Evenepoel (13), Merlier (10), Philipsen (8), De Lie (6), van Aert (5), Meeus (2), Nys (2), Van Wilder (2), Benoot, Fretin, Gilbert, Hermans, Marit, Rickaert, Robeet, Segaert, Theuns, Thijssen, Van Tricht, Vanmarcke, Vansevenant, Vermeersch, Wellens, Widar
2.	France	49	Cosnefroy (6), Démare (6), Godon (4),Grégoire (4), Laporte (3), L Martinez (3), Alaphilippe (2), Magnier (2), Sivakov (2), Bardet, Barguil, Cavagna, Delbove, Dujardin, Isidore, Gaudu, Hofstetter, Laurance, L'Hote, Perez, Peters, Seixas, Sénéchal, Simon, Sparfel, Thomas, Tronchon
3.	Italy	31	Bagioli (2), Baroncini (2), Bettiol (2), Nizzolo (2), Piganzoli (2), Trentin (2), Ulissi (2), Aleotti, Ballerini, Celano, Ciccone, Covi, De Marchi, Fiorelli, Formolo, Ganna, Malucelli, Moschetti, Mozzato, Pellizzari, Scaroni, Tiberi, Viviani, Zana
4.	Netherlands	22	Kooij (5), de Kleijn (3), van der Poel (3), Jakobsen (2), Poels (2), Eekhoff, Groenewegen, Krijnsen, Mollema, Riesebeek, van den Broek, van der Hoorn
5.	Great Britain	21	Brennan (3), Pidcock (3), A Yates (3), Cavendish (2), Williams (2), Carr, Geoghegan Hart, Hayter, Poole, Swift, Tulett, Walls, Watson, S Yates
6.	Spain	19	Ayuso (4), I Izagirre (2), Serrano (2), Adrià, Díaz, García Cortina, G Izagirre, Landa, Lazkano, JP López, Mas, Romeo, Sevilla, Valverde
7.	Denmark	16	M Pedersen (4), Cort (2), Skjelmose (2), Vingegaard (2), Asgreen, Foldager, Fuglsang, C Pedersen, H Pedersen, Valgren
7.	United States	16	McNulty (5), Powless (3), Simmons (2), August, Jorgenson, Kuss, Sheehan, Sheffield, Shmidt
9.	Norway	14	Kristoff (3), Abrahamsen (2), Hagenes (2), Tiller (2), Wærenskjold (2), Johannessen, Leknessund, Løland
10.	New Zealand	12	Strong (4), Gate (2), G Bennett, Bevin, Jackson, Oliver, Pithie, Smith
10.	Slovenia	12	Pogačar (7), Roglič (4), Polanc
12.	Colombia	11	Buitrago (2), MÁ López (2), D Martínez (2), Quintana (2), Sosa (2), Molano
13.	Switzerland	10	Hirschi (6), Schmid (2), Christen, Küng
14.	Germany	8	Ackermann (3), Jasch, Lipowitz, Politt, Steimle, Walscheid
14.	Mexico	8	del Toro (8)
16.	Portugal	6	Costa (2), Morgado (2), Almeida, Rodrigues
16.	Australia	6	Ewan (2), Berwick, Clarke, Stannard, Storer
18.	Eritrea	4	Girmay (2), Mulubrhan (2)
19.	Ecuador	3	Cepeda, HM López, Caicedo
20.	Ireland	2	S Bennett, Healy
20.	Russia	2	Vlasov (2)
20.	Uruguay	2	Silva (2)
23.	Austria	1	Gall
23.	Czech Republic	1	Hirt
23.	Sweden	1	Söderqvist
23.	Ukraine	1	Tsarenko

=== Race wins by team ===
Teams in italics are no longer active.

Rank	Team	Wins	Riders
1.	UAE Team Emirates XRG	47	del Toro (8), Pogačar (7), Hirschi (6), McNulty (5), Ayuso (3), Cosnefroy (3), Baroncini (2), Morgado (2), Ulissi (2), A Yates (2), Ackermann, Christen, Formolo, Molano, Polanc, Sivakov, Wellens
2.	Soudal–Quick-Step	38	Evenepoel (12), Merlier (7), Alaphilippe (2), Bagioli (2), Cavendish (2), Jakobsen (2), Magnier (2), Van Wilder (2), Almeida, Asgreen, Ballerini, Cavagna, Schmid, Sénéchal, Vansevenant
3.	Visma–Lease a Bike	28	van Aert (5), Kooij (4), Roglič (4), Brennan (3), Hagenes (2), Laporte (2), Piganzoli (2), Vingegaard (2), G Bennett, Benoot, Fiorelli, Kuss
4.	Alpecin–Premier Tech	20	Philipsen (8), Merlier (3), van der Poel (3), Laurance, Rickaert, Riesebeek, Stannard, Van Tricht, Vermeersch
5.	Decathlon CMA CGM Team	15	Cosnefroy (3), Godon (3), S Bennett, Gall, Isidore, Kooij, L'Hote, Peters, Seixas, Sparfel, Tronchon
5.	Netcompany–Ineos	15	D Martínez (2), August, Ganna, Geoghegan Hart, Godon, Hayter, Pidcock, Sheffield, Shmidt, Sivakov, Sosa, Tulett, Watson, A Yates
5.	Lidl–Trek	15	M Pedersen (4), Nys (2), Simmons (2), Skjelmose (2), Ayuso, JP López, Mollema, Söderqvist, Theuns
7.	Groupama–FDJ United	14	Démare (6), Grégoire (4), L Martinez (2), Gaudu, Küng
7.	NSN Cycling Team	14	Strong (4), Williams (2), Ackermann, Bevin, De Marchi, Girmay, Hermans, Nizzolo, Sheehan, Vanmarcke
10.	Red Bull–Bora–Hansgrohe	12	Meeus (2), Ackermann, Adrià, Aleotti, Evenepoel, Lipowitz, Pellizzari, Pithie, Politt, Vlasov, Walls
11.	XDS Astana Team	11	Silva (2), Fuglsang, Gate, G Izagirre, HM López, Malucelli, Mulubrhan, Poels, Scaroni, Vlasov
11.	Uno-X Mobility	11	Abrahamsen (2), Cort (2), Tiller (2), Wærenskjold (2), Johannessen, Løland, H Pedersen
13.	Lotto–Intermarché	10	De Lie (6), Ewan (2), Gilbert, Widar
13.	Movistar Team	10	Serrano (2), García Cortina, Jorgenson, Lazkano, MÁ López, Mas, Romeo, Sosa, Valverde
15.	EF Education–EasyPost	9	Powless (3), Bettiol (2), Carr, Clarke, Healy, Valgren
15.	Intermarché–Wanty	9	Kristoff (3), Costa (2), Girmay, Hirt, Thijssen, van der Hoorn
17.	Cofidis	8	I Izagirre (2), Fretin, Laporte, Perez, Thomas, Viviani, Walscheid
18.	Team Bahrain Victorious	7	Buitrago (2), Landa, L Martinez, Poels, Segaert, Tiberi
18.	Tudor Pro Cycling Team	7	de Kleijn (3), Trentin (2), Jasch, Storer
20.	Arkéa–B&B Hotels	6	Quintana (2), Barguil, Hofstetter, Mozzato, Swift
20.	Team Picnic–PostNL	6	Bardet, Eekhoff, Leknessund, C Pedersen, Poole, van den Broek
20.	Team Jayco–AlUla	6	Covi, Foldager, Schmid, Smith, S Yates, Zana
23.	Pinarello–Q36.5 Pro Cycling Team	4	Pidcock (2), Moschetti, Steimle
24.	Team TotalEnergies	3	Delbove, Dujardin, Simon
25	Caja Rural–Seguros RGA	2	Berwick, Cepeda
25	Team Medellín–EPM	2	MÁ López, Sevilla
27.	Bolton Equities Black Spoke	1	Jackson
27.	Burgos Burpellet BH	1	Gate
27.	Delko	1	Díaz
27.	Italy (national team)	1	Ciccone
27.	Malaysia Pro Cycling	1	Celano
27.	Azerion / Villa Valkenburg	1	Krijnsen
27.	Team Flanders–Baloise	1	Marit
27.	Modern Adventure Pro Cycling	1	Oliver
27.	Team Qhubeka NextHash	1	Nizzolo
27.	Solution Tech NIPPO Rali	1	Tsarenko
27.	Bardiani–CSF 7 Saber	1	Mulubrhan
27.	Unibet Rose Rockets	1	Groenewegen
27.	W52 / FC Porto	1	Rodrigues
27.	Wagner Bazin WB	1	Robeet
27.	Wheeltop Rotor Chengdu Team	1	Caicedo

== See also ==
- UCI race classifications
