= 2023 UCI Road World Championships – Men's under-23 road race =

Cycling race

Men's under-23 road race
2023 UCI Road World Championships

Race details
- Dates: 12 August 2023
- Stages: 1 in Balloch, Great Britain
- Distance: 168.4 km (104.6 mi)
- Winning time: 4h 04' 58"

Medalists
	Gold	(France) Axel Laurance (FRA)
	Silver	(Portugal) António Morgado (POR)
	Bronze	(Slovakia) Martin Svrček (SVK)

The men's under-23 road race of the 2023 UCI Road World Championships was a cycling event that took place on 12 August 2023 in Balloch, Great Britain. French cyclist Axel Laurance won the race.

== Final classification ==
Rank	Rider	Country	Time
1	Axel Laurance	France	4h 04' 58"
2	António Morgado	Portugal	+ 2"
3	Martin Svrček	Slovakia	+ 2"
4	Jack Rootkin-Gray	Great Britain	+ 2"
5	Lorenzo Milesi	Italy	+ 2"
6	Moritz Kretschy	Germany	+ 9"
7	Alec Segaert	Belgium	+ 1' 01"
8	Iván Romeo	Spain	+ 1' 01"
9	Max Walker	Great Britain	+ 1' 03"
10	Pierre Gautherat	France	+ 1' 41"
11	Carlos Canal	Spain	+ 1' 43"
12	Trym Brennsæter	Norway	+ 2' 33"
13	Igor Arrieta	Spain	+ 2' 35"
14	Henri Uhlig	Germany	+ 3' 07"
15	Luke Lamperti	United States	+ 3' 16"
16	Colby Simmons	United States	+ 3' 16"
17	Tim Torn Teutenberg	Germany	+ 3' 16"
18	Robert Donaldson	Great Britain	+ 3' 16"
19	Loe van Belle	Netherlands	+ 3' 16"
20	Mats Wenzel	Luxembourg	+ 3' 16"
21	Davide De Pretto	Italy	+ 3' 16"
22	Gil Gelders	Belgium	+ 3' 16"
20	Pavel Bittner	Czech Republic	+ 3' 16"
24	Kasper Andersen	Denmark	+ 3' 16"
25	Darren Rafferty	Ireland	+ 3' 16"
26	Logan Currie	New Zealand	+ 3' 16"
27	Thibau Nys	Belgium	+ 3' 24"
28	Madis Mihkels	Estonia	+ 3' 28"
29	Aivaras Mikutis	Lithuania	+ 4' 54"
30	Alekss Krasts	Latvia	+ 4' 54"
31	Hamza Amari	Algeria	+ 4' 54"
32	Pierre-Pascal Keup	Germany	+ 4' 54"
33	Fabio Christen	Switzerland	+ 4' 54"
34	Jakub Ťoupalik	Czech Republic	+ 4' 54"
35	Alexander Hajek	Austria	+ 4' 54"
36	Yuhi Todome	Japan	+ 4' 54"
37	Gonçalo Tavares	Portugal	+ 4' 54"
38	Pavel Novák	Czech Republic	+ 4' 57"
39	Nicolò Buratti	Italy	+ 6' 50"
40	Alastair Mackellar	Australia	+ 8' 07"
41	Brody McDonald	United States	+ 8' 07"
42	Casper van Uden	Netherlands	+ 8' 16"
43	Anders Foldager	Germany	+ 8' 16"
44	Gal Glivar	Slovenia	+ 8' 16"
45	Rotem Tene	Israel	+ 8' 16"
46	Andrey Remkhe	Kazakhstan	+ 8' 16"
47	Pepijn Reinderink	Netherlands	+ 8' 16"
48	Riley Pickrell	Canada	+ 8' 16"
49	Diego Pescador Castro	Colombia	+ 8' 16"
44	Alessandro Romele	Italy	+ 8' 16"
45	Lukas Nerurkar	Great Britain	+ 8' 16"
43	Vicente Rojas	Spain	+ 8' 16"
53	Diogo Gonçalves	Portugal	+ 8' 20"
54	Roel van Sintmaartensdijk	Netherlands	+ 8' 27"
55	Ole Theiler	Germany	+ 9' 21"
56	Owen Cole	United States	+ 9' 21"
57	Enzo Paleni	France	+ 9' 56"
58	Philippe Jacob	Canada	+ 10' 01"
59	Milkias Kudus	Eritrea	+ 10' 19"
60	Germán Darío Gómez	Colombia	+ 10' 58"
61	Pablo Bonilla Techera	Uruguay	+ 12' 25"
62	Axel Kallberg	Finland	+ 12' 25"
63	Maksym Bilyi	Ukraine	+ 12' 25"
64	Jesse Kramer	Netherlands	+ 12' 25"
63	José Manuel Aramayo	Bolivia	+ 12' 25"
66	Odhran Doogan	Ireland	+ 12' 25"
67	Michal Pomorski	Poland	+ 12' 25"
68	Hamish McKenzie	Australia	+ 12' 25"
69	Dylan Jiménez	Costa Rica	+ 12' 25"
70	Dean Harvey	Ireland	+ 12' 25"
71	Jamie Meehan	Ireland	+ 12' 25"
72	Jonathan Vervenne	Belgium	+ 12' 25"
73	Frank Aron Ragilo	Estonia	+ 12' 25"
74	Embret Svestad-Bårdseng	Norway	+ 12' 28"
75	Cesar Macias	Mexico	+ 13' 24"
76	Kiya Rogora	Ethiopia	+ 15' 04"
77	Aklilu Arefayne	Eritrea	+ 15' 44"
78	Eddy Le Huitouze	France	+ 17' 26"
79	Carl-Frederik Bevort	Denmark	+ 19' 55"

Rank	Rider	Country	Time
	Jan Christen	Switzerland	DNF
	Santiago Umba	Colombia	DNF
	Raúl García Pierna	Spain	DNF
	Stian Fredheim	Norway	DNF
	Alexandre Montez	Portugal	DNF
	Dylan Hopkins	Australia	DNF
	Yegor Strelnikov	Kazakhstan	DNF
	Noe Ury	Luxembourg	DNF
	Samuel Kovač	Slovakia	DNF
	Abdulla Jasimal-Ali	United Arab Emirates	DNF
	Tomaš Přidal	Czech Republic	DNF
	Andrii Zozulia	Ukraine	DNF
	Kristians Belohvosciks	Latvia	DNF
	Simon Nagy	Slovakia	DNF
	Noa Isidore	France	DNF
	Jakob Soderqvist	Sweden	DNF
	Loic Bettendorff	Luxembourg	DNF
	Gvido Kokle	Latvia	DNF
	Emir Uzun	Turkey	DNF
	Maxim Taraskin	Kazakhstan	DNF
	Joshua Gudnitz	Denmark	DNF
	Tymofii Predko	Ukraine	DNF
	Adam Seeman	Czech Republic	DNF
	Tiano da Silva	South Africa	DNF
	Aaron Aus	Estonia	DNF
	Etienne Tuyizere	Rwanda	DNF
	José Aguilar Garita	Costa Rica	DNF
	Alejandro Granados	Costa Rica	DNF
	Antoine Huby	France	DNF
	Nahom Araya	Eritrea	DNF
	Enekoitz Azparren	Spain	DNF
	Hector Quintana	Mexico	DNF
	Guillermo Thomas Silva	Uruguay	DNF
	Aaron Wade	Ireland	DNF
	Ayoub Ferkous	Algeria	DNF
	Warre Vanghluwe	Belgium	DNF
	Dario Igor Belletta	Italy	DNF
	Arno Wallenborn	Luxembourg	DNF
	Serhii Sydor	Ukraine	DNF
	Nicolas Vinokurov	Kazakhstan	DNF
	Lewis Bower	New Zealand	DNF
	Abdelkrim Ferkous	Algeria	DNF
	Nikolaos Michail Drakos	Greece	DNF
	Gustav Wang	Denmark	DNF
	Artem Shmidt	United States	DNF
	Mathieu Kockelmann	Luxembourg	DNF
	Dillon Geary	South Africa	DNF
	Tahir Yigit	Turkey	DNF
	Paul Lomuria	Uganda	DNF
	Rasmus Søjberg Pedersen	Denmark	DNF
	Derrick Chavarria	Belize	DNF
	Josue Salas	Costa Rica	DNF
	Francesco Busatto	Italy	DNF
	Boštjan Murn	Slovenia	DNF
	Aurélien de Comarmond	Mauritius	DNF
	Romet Pajur	Estonia	DNF
	Tord Gudmestad	Norway	DNF
	Teo Pečnik	Slovenia	DNF
	Renus Byiza Uhiriwe	Rwanda	DNF
	Eric Muhoza	Rwanda	DNF
	Daniel Lima	Portugal	DNF
	Dmytro Polupan	Ukraine	DNF
	Sakarias Koller Løland	Norway	DNF
	Pavol Rovder	Slovakia	DNF
	Michael Leonard	Canada	DNF
	Samet Bulut	Turkey	DNF
	Ali Egin	Turkey	DNF
	Tiancheng Li	China	DNF
	Ruslan Aliyev	Kazakhstan	DNF
	Vinicius Rangel Costa	Brazil	DNF
	Ilkhan Dostiyev	Kazakhstan	DNF
	Natan Gregorčič	Slovenia	DNF
	Oliver Rees	Great Britain	DNF
	Dmitriy Bocharov	Uzbekistan	DNF
	Jinyang Ju	China	DNF
	Changsheng Sun	China	DNF
	Muhammad Andy Royan	Indonesia	DNF
	Wilson Sanon	Haiti	DNF
	Lauri Tamm	Estonia	DNF
	Vainqueur Masengesho	Rwanda	DNF
	Samuel Niyonkuru	Rwanda	DNF
	Mohammed Al-Wahibi	Oman	DNF
	Ivan Pereira del Valle	Indonesia	DNF
	Jacob Schembri	Malta	DNF
	Nelio da Cruz	Cape Verde	DNF
	Kabelo Makatile	Lesotho	DNF
	Kohath Baron	Dominica	DNF
	Brandon Rodriguez	El Salvador	DNF
	Anderson Arboleda	Colombia	DNF
	Jonathan Guatibonza	Colombia	DNF
	Muhammad Ismail Anwar	Pakistan	DNF
	Filip Lohinský	Slovakia	DNF
	Patrick Eddy	Australia	DNF
	Brady Gilmore	Australia	DNF
	Moses Muiruri	Kenya	DNF
	Brian Kipkemboi	Kenya	DNS
