= 2022 UCI Road World Championships – Men's under-23 time trial =

Cycling event

Men's under-23 time trial
2022 UCI Road World Championships

Race details
- Dates: 19 September 2022
- Distance: 28.8 km (17.90 mi)
- Winning time: 34' 13.40"

Medalists
	Gold	Søren Wærenskjold (NOR)
	Silver	Alec Segaert (BEL)
	Bronze	Leo Hayter (GBR)

The Men's under-23 time trial of the 2022 UCI Road World Championships was a cycling event that took place on 19 September 2022 in Wollongong, Australia. It was the 26th edition of the championship. The race was won by Norwegian rider Søren Wærenskjold, finishing sixteen seconds ahead of Alec Segaert of Belgium.

== Final classification ==
Rank	Rider	Time
1st place, gold medalist(s)	(Norway) Søren Wærenskjold (NOR)	34' 13.40"
2nd place, silver medalist(s)	(Belgium) Alec Segaert (BEL)	+ 16.34"
3rd place, bronze medalist(s)	(United Kingdom) Leo Hayter (GBR)	+ 24.16"
4	(New Zealand) Logan Currie (NZL)	+ 33.03"
5	(Germany) Michel Hessmann (GER)	+ 39.03"
6	(Denmark) Carl-Frederik Bévort (DEN)	+ 39.39”
7	(France) Eddy Le Huitouze (FRA)	+ 50.77”
8	(Spain) Raúl García Pierna (ESP)	+ 1' 02.20"
9	(Czech Republic) Mathias Vacek (CZE)	+ 1' 03.40"
10	(Italy) Lorenzo Milesi (ITA)	+ 1' 04.53"
11	(Croatia) Fran Miholjević (CRO)	+ 1' 07.16"
12	(Switzerland) Fabian Weiss (SUI)	+ 1' 15.53"
13	(Bermuda) Kaden Hopkins (BER)	+ 1' 33.29"
14	(Belgium) Lennert van Eetvelt (BEL)	+ 1' 37.08"
15	(Lithuania) Aivaras Mikutis (LTU)	+ 1' 42.07"
16	(Italy) Davide Piganzoli (ITA)	+ 1' 44.24"
17	(Kazakhstan) Andrey Remkhe (KAZ)	+ 1' 49.28"
18	(Netherlands) Mick van Dijke (NED)	+ 1' 53.87"
19	(Canada) Tristan Jussaume (CAN)	+ 2' 09.15"
20	(Germany) Hannes Wilksch (GER)	+ 2' 14.35"
21	(Japan) Yuhi Todome (JPN)	+ 2' 19.77"
22	(Kazakhstan) Gleb Brussenskiy (KAZ)	+ 2' 21.19"
23	(Estonia) Joonas Kurits (EST)	+ 2' 32.08"
24	(Netherlands) Axel van der Tuuk (NED)	+ 2' 32.42"
25	(Switzerland) Alexandre Balmer (SUI)	+ 2' 32.48"
26	(Poland) Kacper Gieryk (POL)	+ 2' 38.76"
27	(Poland) Mateusz Gajdulewicz (POL)	+ 2' 43.63"
28	(United States) Patrick Welch (USA)	+ 2' 57.63"
29	(Canada) Carson Miles (CAN)	+ 3' 05.57"
30	(Denmark) Adam Holm Jørgensen (DEN)	+ 3' 52.41"
31	(Puerto Rico) Christopher Morales Fontan (PUR)	+ 4' 40.36"
32	(Bahrain) Ahmed Madan (BHR)	+ 4' 55.19"
33	(South Africa) Callum Ormiston (RSA)	+ 5' 30.60"
34	(Bahrain) Ahmed Naser (BHR)	+ 5' 35.45"
35	(Algeria) Hamza Amari (ALG)	+ 5' 38.82"
36	(South Africa) Tiano Da Silva (RSA)	+ 5' 43.65"
37	(Hong Kong) Tsun Wai Chu (HKG)	+ 5' 53.29"
38	(United Arab Emirates) Mohammad Almutaiwei (UAE)	+ 6' 01.15"
39	(Eritrea) Amanuel Mehari (ERI)	+ 7' 04.73"
40	(Colombia) Juan Manuel Barboza (COL)	+ 7' 24.59"
41	(Pakistan) Ismail Anwar (PAK)	+ 7' 59.89"
42	(Eritrea) Simon Tesfagaber (ERI)	+ 8' 49.84"
43	(Guam) Blayde Blas (GUM)	+ 10' 03.66"
	(Spain) Ivan Romeo Abad (ESP)	DNF
