= Martin Svrček =

Slovak cyclist

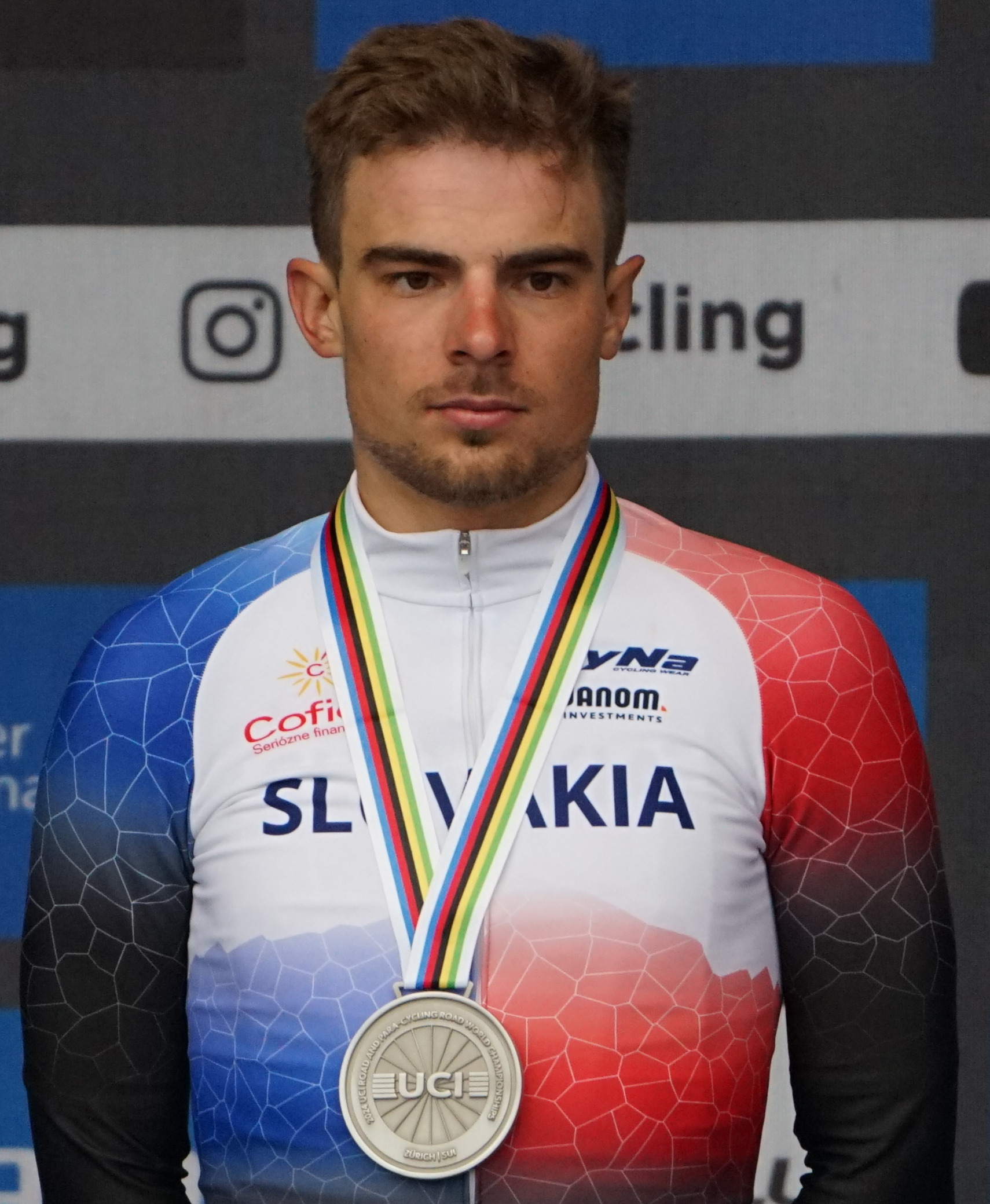
- Svrček at the 2024 UCI Road World Championships

Personal information
- Born: 17 February 2003 (age 23) Nesluša, Slovakia
- Height: 1.75 m (5 ft 9 in)
- Weight: 66 kg (146 lb)

Cycling career
- Sport: Cycling
- Current team: Soudal–Quick-Step
- Discipline: Road
- Role: Rider

Amateur teams
- 2013–2020: Peter Sagan Academy
- 2021: Team Franco Ballerini

Professional teams
- 2022: Biesse–Carrera
- 2022–: Quick-Step Alpha Vinyl Team
Medal record
Men's cycling
Representing Slovakia
World Championships
Silver medal – second place	2024 Zurich	Under-23 road race
Bronze medal – third place	2023 Edinburgh	Under-23 road race
European Youth Summer Olympic Festival
Bronze medal – third place	2019 Baku	Boys' road race

Martin Svrček (born 17 February 2003) is a professional Slovak cyclist, who currently rides for UCI WorldTeam Soudal–Quick-Step.

== Career ==
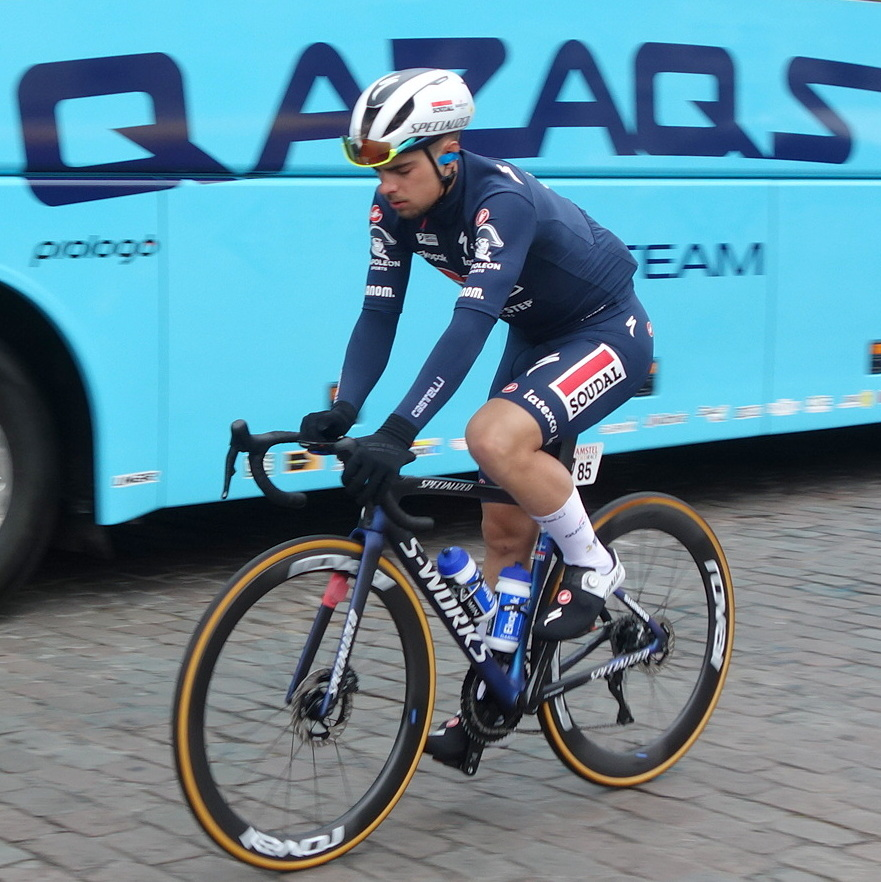
Svrček at the 2023 Amstel Gold Race.

Svrček finished fourth in the 2021 UCI Road World Championships – Junior men's road race missing out on a medal by being beaten in the sprint by Madis Mihkels. Earlier in the year at the UEC European Junior Road Championships Martin finished sixteenth in the time trial 92 seconds down on winner Alec Segaert.

Svrček rode for Biesse–Carrera for the first half of 2022 before joining Quick-Step Alpha Vinyl Team.

== Major results ==
2020
National Junior Road Championships

1st Time trial
3rd Road race

2021
National Junior Road Championships

1st Road race
1st Time trial

4th Road race, UCI Junior Road World Championships
6th Paris–Roubaix Juniors
7th Overall Medzinárodné dni cyklistiky

1st Stage 3

8th Road race, UEC European Junior Road Championships
2022
5th Road race, National Road Championships
2023
3rd Road race, UCI Road World Under-23 Championships
2024
1st Gullegem Koerse
2nd Road race, UCI Road World Under-23 Championships
2nd Road race, National Road Championships
2025
3rd Time trial, National Road Championships
