= 2026 Classique Dunkerque =

2026 UCI ProSeries

Race details
- Dates: 19 May 2026
- Stages: 1
- Distance: 202.7 km (126.0 mi)
- Winning time: 5h 00' 50"

Results
	Winner	Artem Shmidt (USA)	(Netcompany INEOS)
	Second	Pierre Gautherat (FRA)	(Decathlon CMA CGM)
	Third	Jordi Meeus (BEL)	(Red Bull–Bora–Hansgrohe)

The 2026 Classique Dunkerque was the second edition of Classique Dunkerque, a one-day road cycling race that started in Dunkerque and finished in Mont-Saint-Éloi, which took place on 19 May 2026.

== Teams ==
Ten UCI WorldTeams, four UCI ProTeams, and four UCI Continental teams made up the eighteen teams that participated in the race.

UCI WorldTeams

- Decathlon CMA CGM
- EF Education–EasyPost
- Groupama–FDJ United
- Lotto–Intermarché
- Movistar Team
- Netcompany INEOS
- NSN Cycling Team
- Red Bull–Bora–Hansgrohe
- Team Picnic–PostNL
- Uno-X Mobility

UCI ProTeams

- Cofidis
- Team TotalEnergies
- Tudor Pro Cycling Team
- Unibet Rose Rockets

UCI Continental Teams

- CIC Pro Cycling Academy
- Nice Métropole Côte d'Azur
- St. Michel–Preference Home–Auber93
- Van Rysel–Roubaix

== Result ==
Result
Rank	Rider	Team	Time
1	Artem Shmidt (USA)	Netcompany INEOS	5h 00' 50"
2	Pierre Gautherat (FRA)	Decathlon CMA CGM	+ 4"
3	Jordi Meeus (BEL)	Red Bull–Bora–Hansgrohe	+ 4"
4	Alessio Magagnotti (ITA)	Red Bull–Bora–Hansgrohe	+ 4"
5	Tobias Müller (GER)	Unibet Rose Rockets	+ 6"
6	Thibaud Gruel (FRA)	Groupama–FDJ United	+ 6"
7	Kim Heiduk (GER)	Netcompany INEOS	+ 6"
8	Marius Mayrhofer (GER)	Tudor Pro Cycling Team	+ 6"
9	Matys Grisel (FRA)	Lotto–Intermarché	+ 6"
10	Jon Barrenetxea (ESP)	Movistar Team	+ 6"
