= 2024 UCI Road World Championships – Men's under-23 time trial =

Cycling event

Men's under-23 time trial
2024 UCI Road World Championships
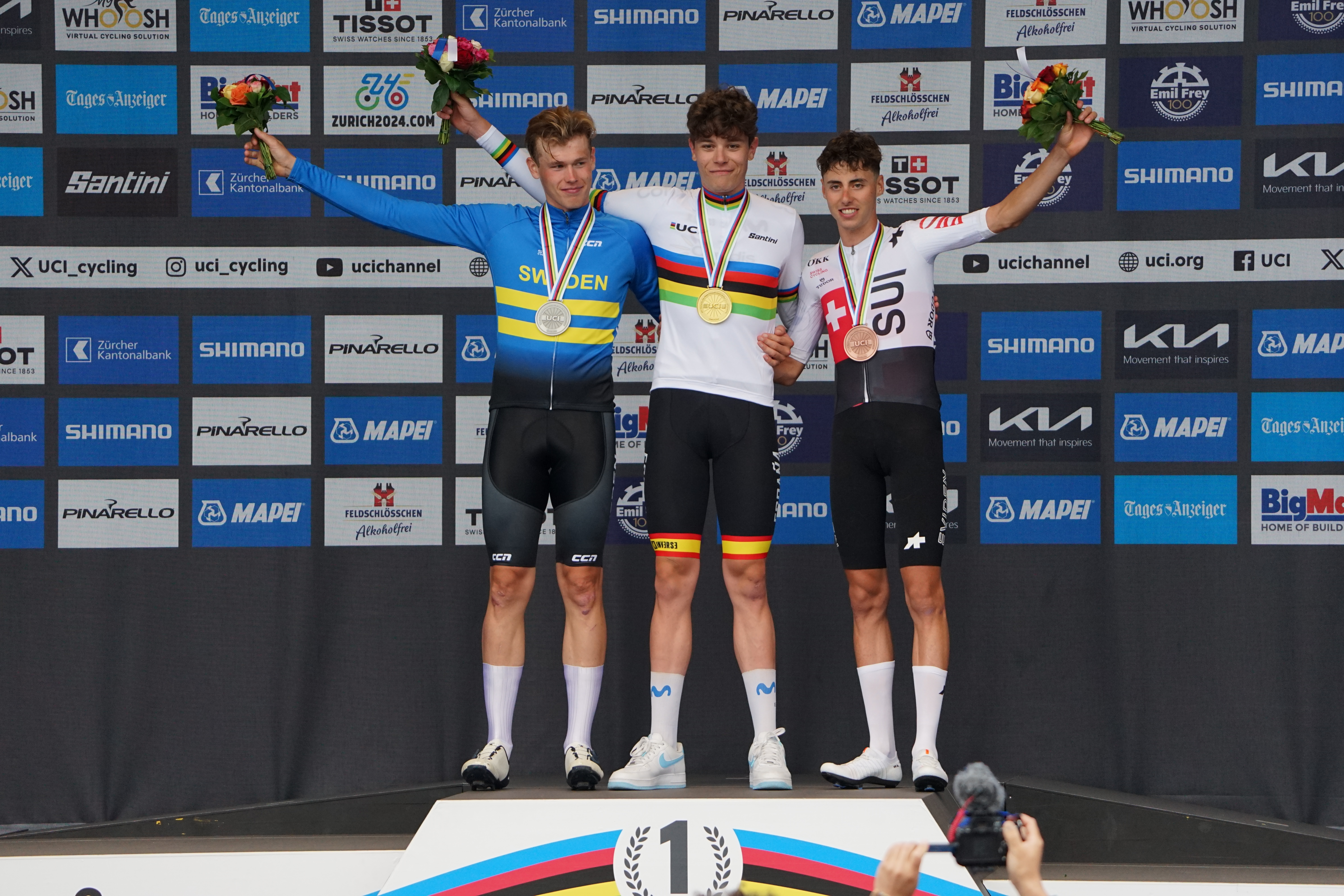
- The podium

Race details
- Dates: 23 September 2024
- Distance: 29.9 km (18.6 mi)
- Winning time: 36:42.70

Medalists
	Gold	(Spain) Iván Romeo (ESP)
	Silver	(Sweden) Jakob Söderqvist (SWE)
	Bronze	(Switzerland) Jan Christen (SUI)

The Men's under-23 time trial of the 2024 UCI Road World Championships was a cycling event that took place on 23 September 2024 in Zurich, Switzerland. It was the 28th edition of the championship, for which Lorenzo Milesi of Italy was the defending champion, having won in 2023.

== Continental champions ==
Name	Country	Reason
Lorenzo Milesi	Italy	Incumbent World Champion
Kiya Rogora	Ethiopia	African Champion
Nicolas Vinokurov	Kazakhstan	Asian Champion
Alec Segaert	Belgium	European Champion
Jackson Medway	Australia	Oceanian Champion
Héctor Quintana	Chile	Panamerican Champion

== Final classification ==
Pos.	Position in the time trial
Time	Time taken to complete the time trial
Diff	Deficit to the winner of the time trial
DNS	Denotes a rider who did not start
DNF	Denotes a rider who did not finish
DSQ	Denotes a rider who was disqualified from the race
OTL	Denotes a rider who finished outside the time limit

Rank	Rider	Country	Time	Diff.
1st place, gold medalist(s)	Iván Romeo	Spain	36:42.70	
2nd place, silver medalist(s)	Jakob Söderqvist	Sweden	37:14.75	+ 32.05
3rd place, bronze medalist(s)	Jan Christen	Switzerland	37:23.38	+ 40.68
4	Alec Segaert	Belgium	37:36.79	+ 54.09
5	Robin Orins	Belgium	37:40.57	+ 57.87
6	Darren Rafferty	Ireland	37:44.22	+ 1:01.52
7	Niklas Behrens	Germany	37:50.93	+ 1:08.23
8	Artem Shmidt	United States	37:52.74	+ 1:10.04
9	Wessel Mouris	Netherlands	37:54.13	+ 1:11.43
10	Adam Rafferty	Ireland	38:00.37	+ 1:17.67
11	Maxime Decomble	France	38:00.57	+ 1:17.87
12	Isaac del Toro	Mexico	38:06.53	+ 1:23.83
13	Andrea Raccagni Noviero	Italy	38:14.76	+ 1:32.06
14	Patrick Eddy	Australia	38:18.11	+ 1:35.41
15	Arthur Blaise	France	38:19.39	+ 1:36.69
16	Rasmus Søjberg Pedersen	Denmark	38:25.18	+ 1:42.48
17	Andrew August	United States	38:26.13	+ 1:43.43
18	Ben Wiggins	Great Britain	38:39.98	+ 1:57.28
19	Fabian Weiss	Switzerland	38:41.88	+ 1:59.18
20	Josh Charlton	Great Britain	38:47.81	+ 2:05.11
21	Bryan Olivo	Italy	38:56.84	+ 2:14.14
22	Aivaras Mikutis	Lithuania	39:04.83	+ 2:22.13
23	António Morgado	Portugal	39:07.26	+ 2:24.56
24	Menno Huising	Netherlands	39:08.28	+ 2:25.58
25	Ole Theiler	Germany	39:11.87	+ 2:29.17
26	Mateusz Gajdulewicz	Poland	39:12.76	+ 2:30.06
27	Adam Holm Jørgensen	Denmark	39:15.67	+ 2:32.97
28	Matthias Schwarzbacher	Slovakia	39:16.80	+ 2:34.10
29	Noah Vandenbranden	Belgium	39:28.76	+ 2:46.06
30	Axel Källberg	Finland	39:32.91	+ 2:50.21
31	Andrey Remkhe	Kazakhstan	39:39.50	+ 2:56.80
32	Nicolas Vinokurov	Kazakhstan	39:46.81	+ 3:04.11
33	Adrian Stieger	Austria	39:47.12	+ 3:04.42
34	Jonas Walton	Canada	39:56.16	+ 3:13.46
35	Markel Beloki	Spain	39:56.23	+ 3:13.53
36	Dillon Geary	South Africa	40:18.85	+ 3:36.15
37	Nicholas Narraway	Bermuda	40:20.59	+ 3:37.89
38	Dominik Dunár	Slovakia	40:29.57	+ 3:46.87
39	Daniil Yakovlev	Ukraine	40:31.25	+ 3:48.55
40	Kacper Gieryk	Poland	40:38.26	+ 3:55.56
41	Tomáš Přidal	Czech Republic	40:45.03	+ 4:02.33
42	Pedri Crause	South Africa	40:49.83	+ 4:07.13
43	Daniel Rubeš	Czech Republic	41:12.08	+ 4:29.38
44	Rudolf Remkhi	Kazakhstan	41:27.36	+ 4:44.66
45	Jeferson Ruiz	Colombia	41:30.36	+ 4:47.66
46	Héctor Quintana	Chile	41:33.00	+ 4:50.30
47	Mohammad Almutaiwei	United Arab Emirates	42:14.22	+ 5:31.52
48	Aurelien de Comarmond	Mauritius	42:16.60	+ 5:33.90
49	Michael Shea	Canada	42:17.20	+ 5:34.50
50	Paul Lomulia	Uganda	42:20.69	+ 5:37.99
51	Muhammad Syelhan Nurahmat	Indonesia	42:24.14	+ 5:41.44
52	Kiya Rogora	Ethiopia	42:31.15	+ 5:48.45
53	Semen Simon	Ukraine	42:33.15	+ 5:50.45
54	Lawrence Lorot	Uganda	42:37.91	+ 5:55.21
55	Li Zhen	China	43:14.90	+ 6:32.20
56	Koki Kamada	Japan	43:30.41	+ 6:47.71
57	Yordan Petrov	Bulgaria	43:36.28	+ 6:53.58
58	Muhammad Andy Royan	Indonesia	43:47.24	+ 7:04.54
59	Constantinos Ioannou	Cyprus	44:17.08	+ 7:34.38
60	Emir Uzun	Turkey	44:29.12	+ 7:46.42
61	Temuulen Khadbaatar	Mongolia	45:02.29	+ 8:19.59
62	Vainqueur Masengesho	Rwanda	45:14.33	+ 8:31.63
63	Nasrallah Mohamed Aissa Essemiani	Algeria	45:15.92	+ 8:33.22
64	Diego Lei Godoy	Venezuela	45:23.86	+ 8:41.16
65	Davaajargal Altangerel	Mongolia	46:08.24	+ 9:25.54
66	Etienne Tuyizere	Rwanda	46:12.80	+ 9:30.10
67	Amir Taha	Ethiopia	46:48.83	+ 10:06.13
68	Slimane Badlis	Algeria	46:55.31	+ 10:12.61
DNF	David Elias Rico Barraza	Mexico		
DNS	Mateo Kalejman Quiroga	Argentina		
