= 2026 Flandrien 0.0 Classic =

2026 UCI ProSeries
- Event poster with previous winner Arnaud De Lie

Race details
- Dates: 19 September 2026
- Stages: 1
- Distance: 199.4 km (123.9 mi)
- Winning time: 4h 18' 14"

Results
	Winner	Henrik Pedersen (DEN)	(Uno-X Mobility)
	Second	Laurence Pithie (NZL)	(Red Bull–Bora–Hansgrohe)
	Third	Florian Vermeersch (BEL)	(UAE Team Emirates XRG)

The 2026 Flandrien 0.0 Classic (also known as the Grand Prix Impanis-Van Petegem) was the 28th edition of the Flandrien 0.0 Classic (formerly known as Super 8 Classic) road cycling one day race, which was held on 19 September 2026 as part of the 2026 UCI ProSeries calendar.

== Teams ==
Fifteen UCI WorldTeams, six UCI ProTeams and one UCI Continental team made up the twenty-two teams that participated in the race.

UCI WorldTeams

- Alpecin–Premier Tech
- EF Education–EasyPost
- Groupama–FDJ United
- Lidl–Trek
- Lotto–Intermarché
- Movistar Team
- NSN Cycling Team
- Red Bull–Bora–Hansgrohe
- Soudal–Quick-Step
- Team Bahrain Victorious
- Team Picnic–PostNL
- Team Jayco–AlUla
- UAE Team Emirates XRG
- Uno-X Mobility
- XDS Astana Team

UCI ProTeams

- Cofidis
- Pinarello–Q36.5 Pro Cycling Team
- Team Flanders–Baloise
- Team TotalEnergies
- Tudor Pro Cycling Team
- Unibet Rose Rockets

UCI Continental Teams

- Tarteletto–Isorex

== Results ==
Result
Rank	Rider	Team	Time
1	Henrik Pedersen (DEN)	Uno-X Mobility	4h 18' 14"
2	Laurence Pithie (NZL)	Red Bull–Bora–Hansgrohe	+ 0"
3	Florian Vermeersch (BEL)	UAE Team Emirates XRG	+ 0"
4	Jenno Berckmoes (BEL)	Lotto–Intermarché	+ 0"
5	Tim Torn Teutenberg (GER)	Lidl–Trek	+ 0"
6	Thibaud Gruel (FRA)	Groupama–FDJ United	+ 0"
7	Lukáš Kubiš (SVK)	Unibet Rose Rockets	+ 0"
8	Aimé De Gendt (BEL)	Pinarello–Q36.5 Pro Cycling Team	+ 0"
9	Luke Lamperti (USA)	EF Education–EasyPost	+ 0"
10	Axel Huens (FRA)	Groupama–FDJ United	+ 0"
