= 2025 Classique Dunkerque =

2025 UCI ProSeries

Race details
- Dates: 13 May 2025
- Stages: 1
- Distance: 193.5 km (120.2 mi)
- Winning time: 4h 14' 55"

Results
	Winner	Pascal Ackermann (GER)	(Israel–Premier Tech)
	Second	Biniam Girmay (ERI)	(Intermarché–Wanty)
	Third	Alberto Dainese (ITA)	(Tudor Pro Cycling Team)

The 2025 Classique Dunkerque was the inaugural edition of Classique Dunkerque, a one-day road cycling race that started in Dunkerque and finished in Lens, which took place on 13 May 2025.

== Teams ==
Eleven of the eighteen UCI WorldTeams, nine UCI ProTeams, and four UCI Continental teams made up the 24 teams that participated in the race.

UCI WorldTeams

- Arkéa–B&B Hotels
- Cofidis
- Decathlon–AG2R La Mondiale
- Groupama–FDJ
- Ineos Grenadiers
- Intermarché–Wanty
- Movistar Team
- Soudal–Quick-Step
- Team Picnic PostNL
- Visma–Lease a Bike
- XDS Astana Team

UCI ProTeams

- Caja Rural–Seguros RGA
- Euskaltel–Euskadi
- Israel–Premier Tech
- Lotto
- Team TotalEnergies
- Tudor Pro Cycling Team
- Unibet Tietema Rockets
- Uno-X Mobility
- Wagner Bazin WB

UCI Continental Teams

- CIC–U–Nantes
- Nice Métropole Côte d'Azur
- St. Michel–Preference Home–Auber93
- Van Rysel–Roubaix

== Result ==
Result
Rank	Rider	Team	Time
1	Pascal Ackermann (GER)	Israel–Premier Tech	4h 14' 55"
2	Biniam Girmay (ERI)	Intermarché–Wanty	+ 0"
3	Alberto Dainese (ITA)	Tudor Pro Cycling Team	+ 0"
4	Arnaud Démare (FRA)	Arkéa–B&B Hotels	+ 0"
5	Bryan Coquard (FRA)	Cofidis	+ 0"
6	Cees Bol (NED)	XDS Astana Team	+ 0"
7	Tobias Lund Andresen (DEN)	Team Picnic PostNL	+ 0"
8	Emilien Jeannière (FRA)	Team TotalEnergies	+ 0"
9	Matthew Walls (GBR)	Groupama–FDJ	+ 0"
10	Jon Aberasturi (ESP)	Euskaltel–Euskadi	+ 0"
