= 2026 Grand Prix de Denain =

French cycling race

2026 UCI ProSeries

Race details
- Dates: 19 March 2026
- Stages: 1
- Distance: 200.4 km (124.5 mi)
- Winning time: 4h 21' 23"

Results
	Winner	Alec Segaert (BEL)	(Team Bahrain Victorious)
	Second	Milan Menten (BEL)	(Lotto–Intermarché)
	Third	Anthony Turgis (FRA)	(Team TotalEnergies)

The 2026 Grand Prix de Denain – Porte du Hainaut was the 67th edition of the Grand Prix de Denain one-day road cycling race. It was held on 19 March 2026 as a category 1.Pro race on the 2026 UCI ProSeries calendar.

== Teams ==
Ten UCI WorldTeams, seven UCI ProTeams, and four UCI Continental teams made up the 21 teams that participated in the race.

UCI WorldTeams

- Alpecin–Premier Tech
- Decathlon CMA CGM
- Groupama–FDJ United
- Lidl–Trek
- Lotto–Intermarché
- Red Bull–Bora–Hansgrohe
- Team Bahrain Victorious
- UAE Team Emirates XRG
- Visma–Lease a Bike
- XDS Astana Team

UCI ProTeams

- Caja Rural–Seguros RGA
- Cofidis
- Modern Adventure Pro Cycling
- Pinarello–Q36.5 Pro Cycling Team
- Team Flanders–Baloise
- Team TotalEnergies
- Unibet Rose Rockets

UCI Continental Teams

- CIC Pro Cycling Academy
- Nice Métropole Côte d'Azur
- St. Michel–Preference Home–Auber93
- Van Rysel–Roubaix

== Result ==
Result (1–10)
Rank	Rider	Team	Time
1	Alec Segaert (BEL)	Team Bahrain Victorious	4h 21' 23"
2	Milan Menten (BEL)	Lotto–Intermarché	+ 2"
3	Anthony Turgis (FRA)	Team TotalEnergies	+ 2"
4	Henri Uhlig (GER)	Alpecin–Premier Tech	+ 2"
5	Axel Zingle (FRA)	Visma–Lease a Bike	+ 2"
6	Arne Marit (BEL)	Red Bull–Bora–Hansgrohe	+ 2"
7	Axel Huens (FRA)	Groupama–FDJ United	+ 2"
8	Jenthe Biermans (BEL)	Cofidis	+ 2"
9	Tibor Del Grosso (NED)	Alpecin–Premier Tech	+ 2"
10	Gianluca Pollefliet (BEL)	Decathlon CMA CGM	+ 2"
