= Niklas Behrens =

German cyclist (born 2003)

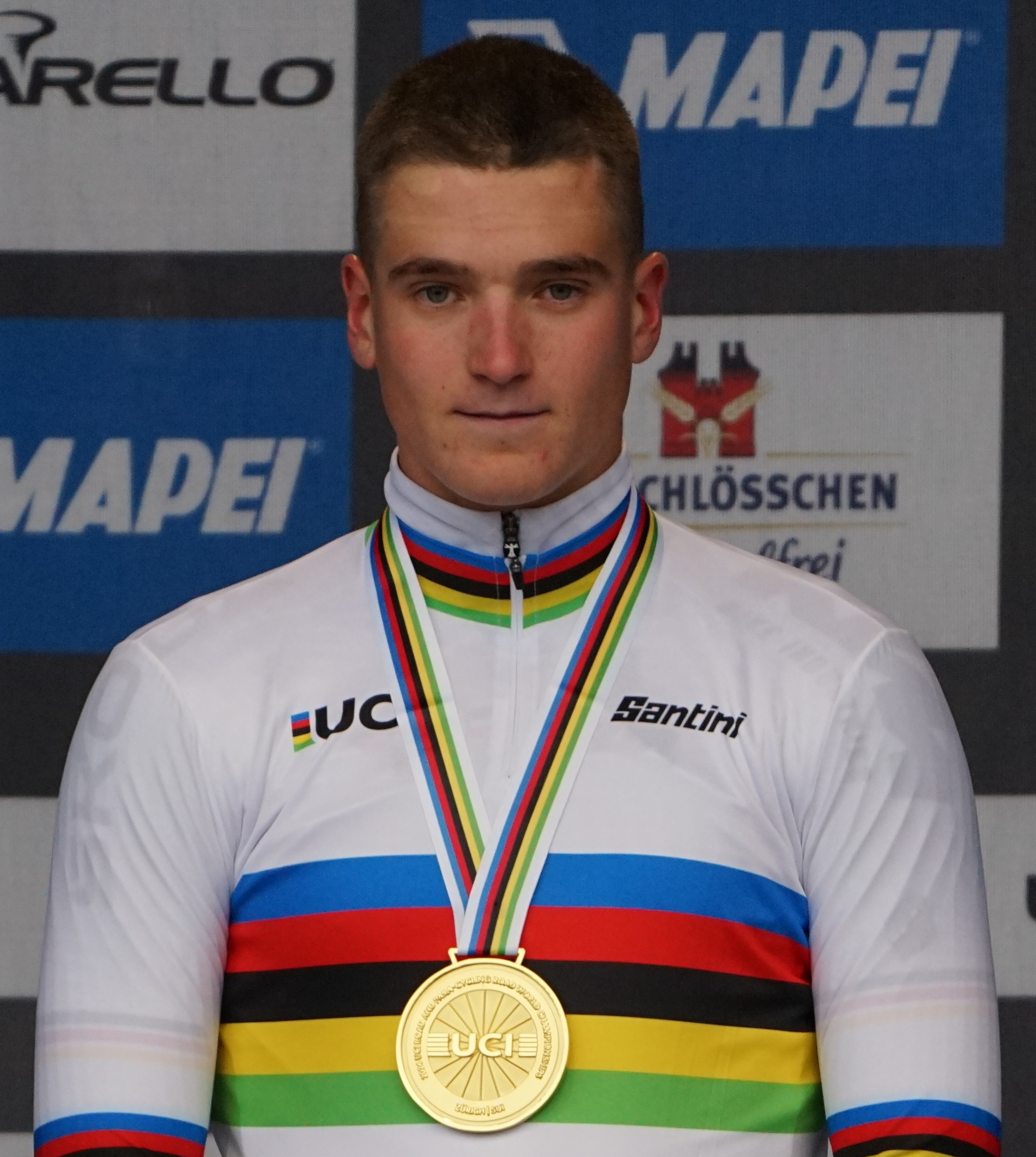
- Behrens at the 2024 World Championships

Personal information
- Born: 6 November 2003 (age 22) Bremen, Germany
- Height: 1.95 m (6 ft 5 in)

Cycling career
- Sport: Cycling
- Current team: Visma–Lease a Bike
- Disciplines: Road; Cyclo-cross
- Role: Rider
- Rider type: Sprinter

Amateur team
- 2022–2023: Stevens Racing Team

Professional teams
- 2023: Team Storck–Metropol Cycling (stagiaire)
- 2024: Lidl–Trek Future Racing
- 2025–: Visma–Lease a Bike
Medal record
Men's road cycling
Representing Germany
World Championships
Gold medal – first place	2024 Zurich	Under-23 road race
European Championships
Silver medal – second place	2024 Limburg	Under-23 Road Race

Niklas Behrens (born 6 November 2003) is a German cyclist, who currently rides for UCI WorldTeam Visma–Lease a Bike. He won the under-23 road race at the 2024 UCI Road World Championships.

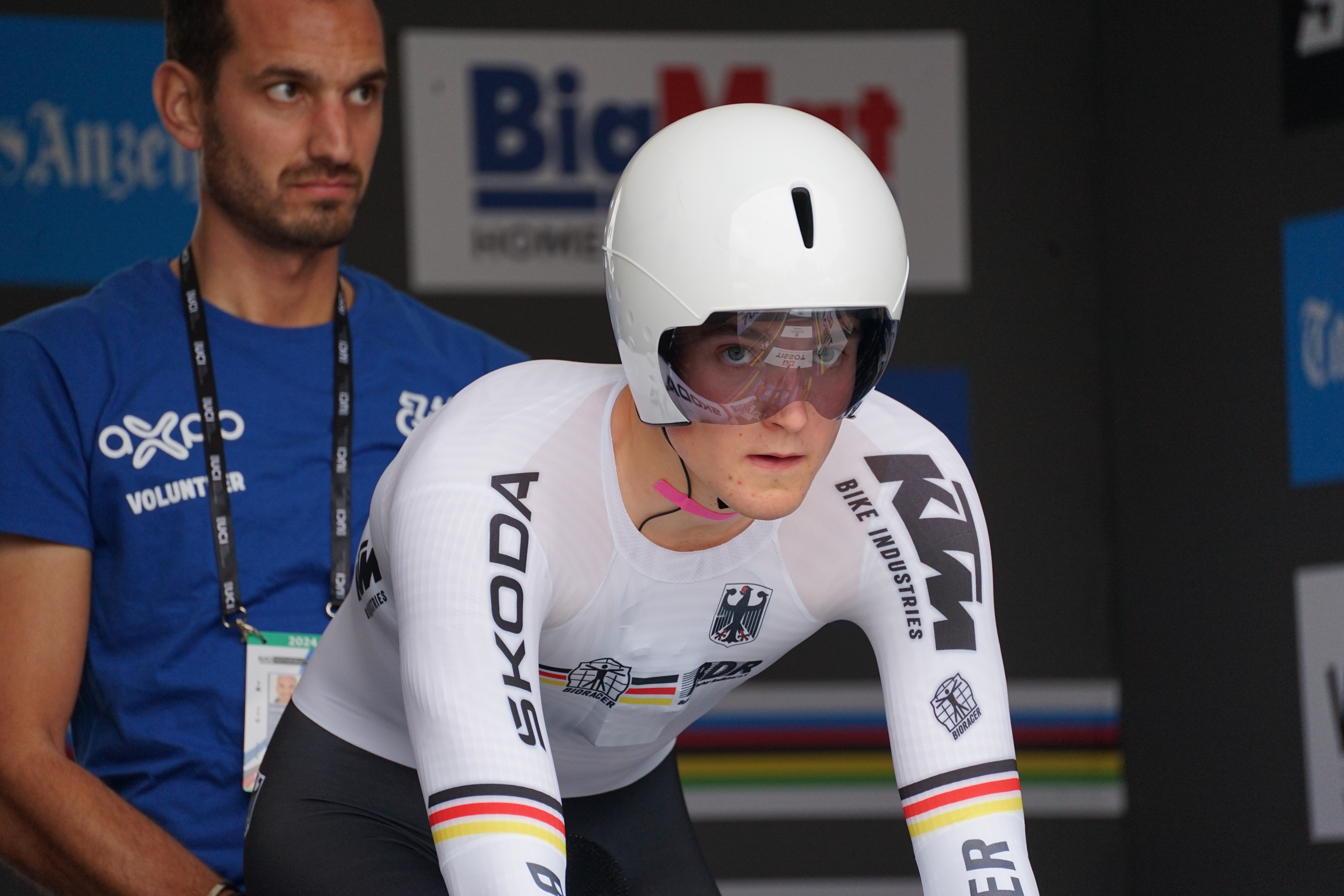
Behrens during the 2024 UCI Road World Championships.

== Major results ==
2023
1st Stage 1 Flanders Tomorrow Tour
2nd Rad am Ring
7th Schaal Sels
2024
UCI Road World Under-23 Championships

1st Road race
7th Time trial

National Under-23 Road Championships

1st Road race
2nd Time trial

1st Youngster Coast Challenge
1st Stage 1 (TTT) Tour Alsace
UEC European Under-23 Road Championships

2nd Road race
8th Time trial

4th Gent–Wevelgem U23
4th Grote Prijs Rik Van Looy
