= Classique Dunkerque =

Cycle road race

Race details
- Date: May
- Region: Hauts-de-France, France
- Discipline: Road
- Competition: UCI ProSeries
- Type: Single-day
- Web site: www.4joursdedunkerque.com

History
- First edition: 2025
- Editions: 2 (as of 2026)
- First winner: Pascal Ackermann (GER)
- Most wins: No repeat winners
- Most recent: Artem Shmidt (USA)

The Classique Dunkerque is a professional road cycling race first held in 2025 in Hauts-de-France. It is organized as a 1.Pro event on the UCI ProSeries calendar.

The race is held by the same organization that manages the Four Days of Dunkirk, and takes place the day before the first stage.

== Winners ==
| Year | Country | Rider | Team |
|---|---|---|---|
| 2025 | Germany | Pascal Ackermann | Israel–Premier Tech |
| 2026 | United States | Artem Shmidt | Netcompany INEOS |
