= Alec Segaert =

Belgian cyclist

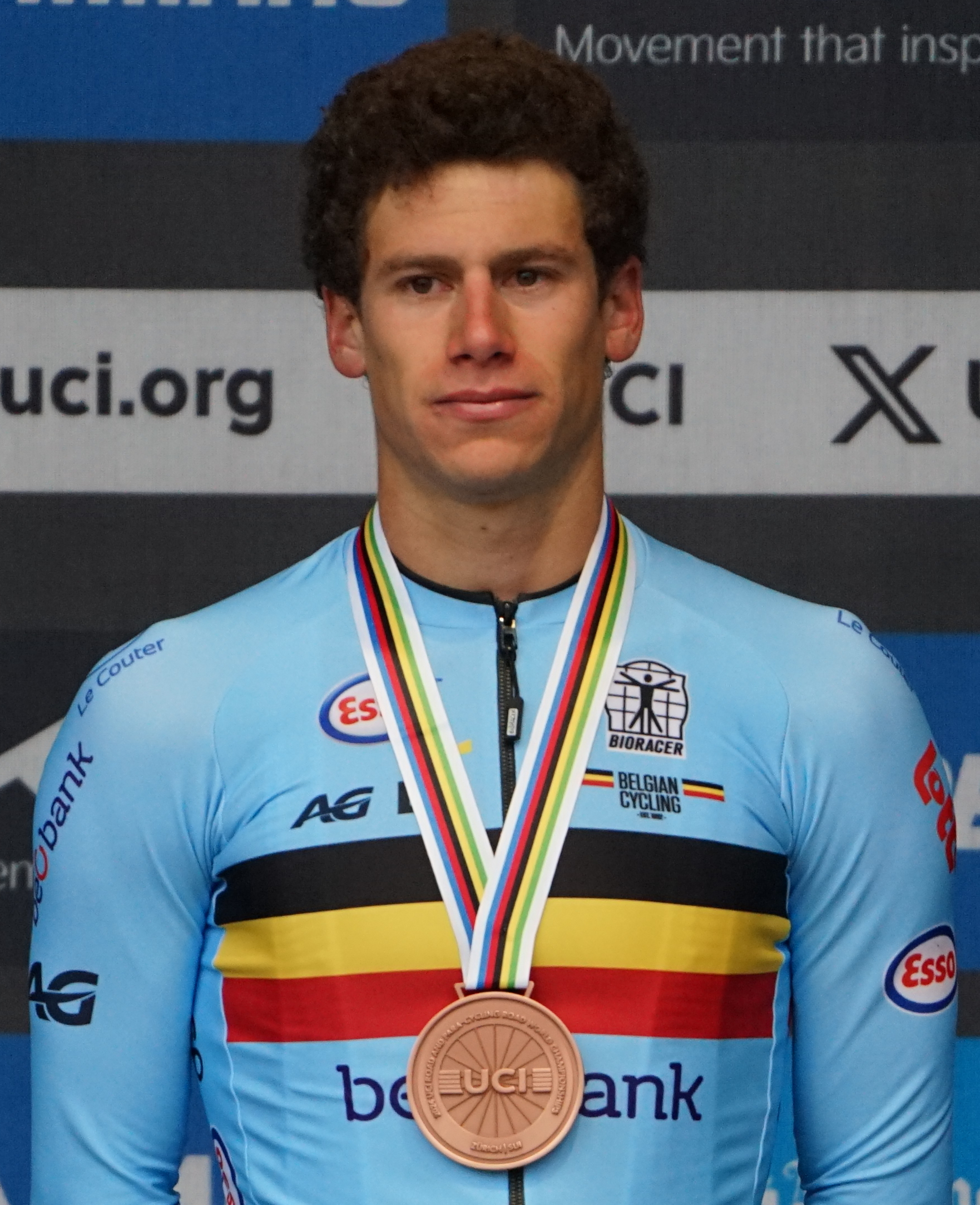
- Segaert at the 2024 UCI Road World Championships

Personal information
- Born: 16 January 2003 (age 23) Roeselare, Belgium
- Height: 1.88 m (6 ft 2 in)
- Weight: 79 kg (174 lb)

Cycling career
- Sport: Cycling
- Current team: Team Bahrain Victorious
- Discipline: Road
- Role: Rider
- Rider type: Time trialist

Amateur teams
- 2020–2021: Gaverzicht–BE Okay
- 2022–2023: Lotto–Soudal U23

Professional teams
- 2023–2025: Lotto–Dstny
- 2026–: Team Bahrain Victorious

Major wins
- Grand Tours Giro d'Italia 1 individual stage (2026) One-day races and Classics National Time Trial Championships (2026) GP de Denain (2026)
Medal record
Men's road bicycle racing
Representing Belgium
World Championships
Silver medal – second place	2022 Wollongong	Under-23 time trial
Silver medal – second place	2023 Glasgow	Under-23 time trial
Bronze medal – third place	2021 Flanders	Junior time trial
Bronze medal – third place	2024 Zurich	Under-23 road race
European Championships
Gold medal – first place	2021 Trentino	Junior time trial
Gold medal – first place	2022 Anadia	Under-23 time trial
Gold medal – first place	2023 Drenthe	Under-23 time trial
Gold medal – first place	2024 Limburg	Under-23 time trial

Alec Segaert (born 16 January 2003) is a Belgian cyclist, who currently rides for UCI ProTeam Team Bahrain Victorious.

Segaert won stage 12 of the 2026 Giro d'Italia; the stage was expected to be a sprint finish, however Segaert attacked from the peloton with three kilometres to go and won.

== Major results ==
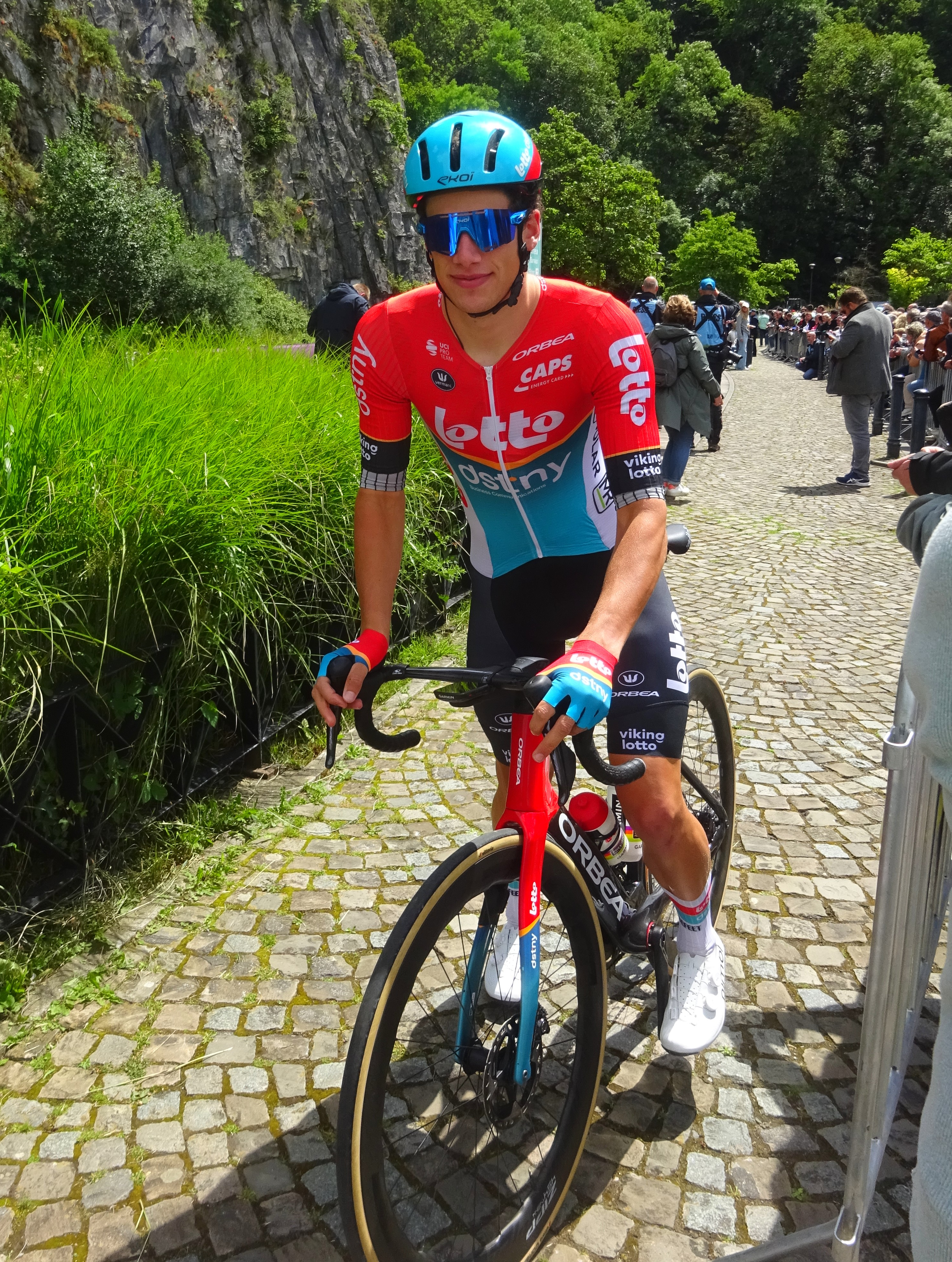
Alec Segaert in Durbuy, 2024 Tour of Belgium

2021
1st Time trial, UEC European Junior Road Championships
1st Overall Internationale Juniorenrundfahrt

1st Stage 1

1st Chrono des Nations Juniors
2nd Paris–Roubaix Juniors
2nd Time trial, National Junior Road Championships
3rd Time trial, UCI Junior Road World Championships
3rd Overall Driedaagse van Axel
9th Overall Aubel–Thimister–Stavelot
2022
1st Time trial, UEC European Under-23 Road Championships
1st Time trial, National Under-23 Road Championships
1st Piccolo Giro di Lombardia
1st Chrono des Nations Under-23
1st Hel van Voerendaal
1st Memorial Igor Decraene
1st Stage 1 (TTT) Tour Alsace
2nd Time trial, UCI Road World Under-23 Championships
4th Overall Le Triptyque des Monts et Châteaux
2023
1st Time trial, UEC European Under-23 Road Championships
1st Stage 1 (ITT) Giro Next Gen
1st Stage 1 (TTT) Tour Alsace
UCI Road World Under-23 Championships

2nd Time trial
7th Road race

National Road Championships

2nd Road race
2nd Time trial

8th Piccolo Giro di Lombardia
2024 (2 pro wins)
1st Time trial, UEC European Under-23 Road Championships
1st Grand Prix Criquielion
2nd Time trial, National Road Championships
2nd Overall Renewi Tour

1st Young rider classification
1st Stage 2 (ITT)

UCI Road World Under-23 Championships

3rd Road race
4th Time trial

7th Overall Tour of Belgium
2025
1st Young rider classification, Tour of Belgium
3rd Time trial, National Road Championships
5th Overall Danmark Rundt
8th Grand Prix de Denain
10th Time trial, UEC European Road Championships
10th Dwars door Vlaanderen
2026 (3)
1st Time trial, National Road Championships
1st Grand Prix de Denain
1st Stage 12 Giro d'Italia
6th Overall Renewi Tour

=== Grand Tour general classification results timeline ===
Grand Tour	2025	2026
Giro d'Italia	—	72
Tour de France	—	—
Vuelta a España	96	
