= Axel Laurance =

French cyclist

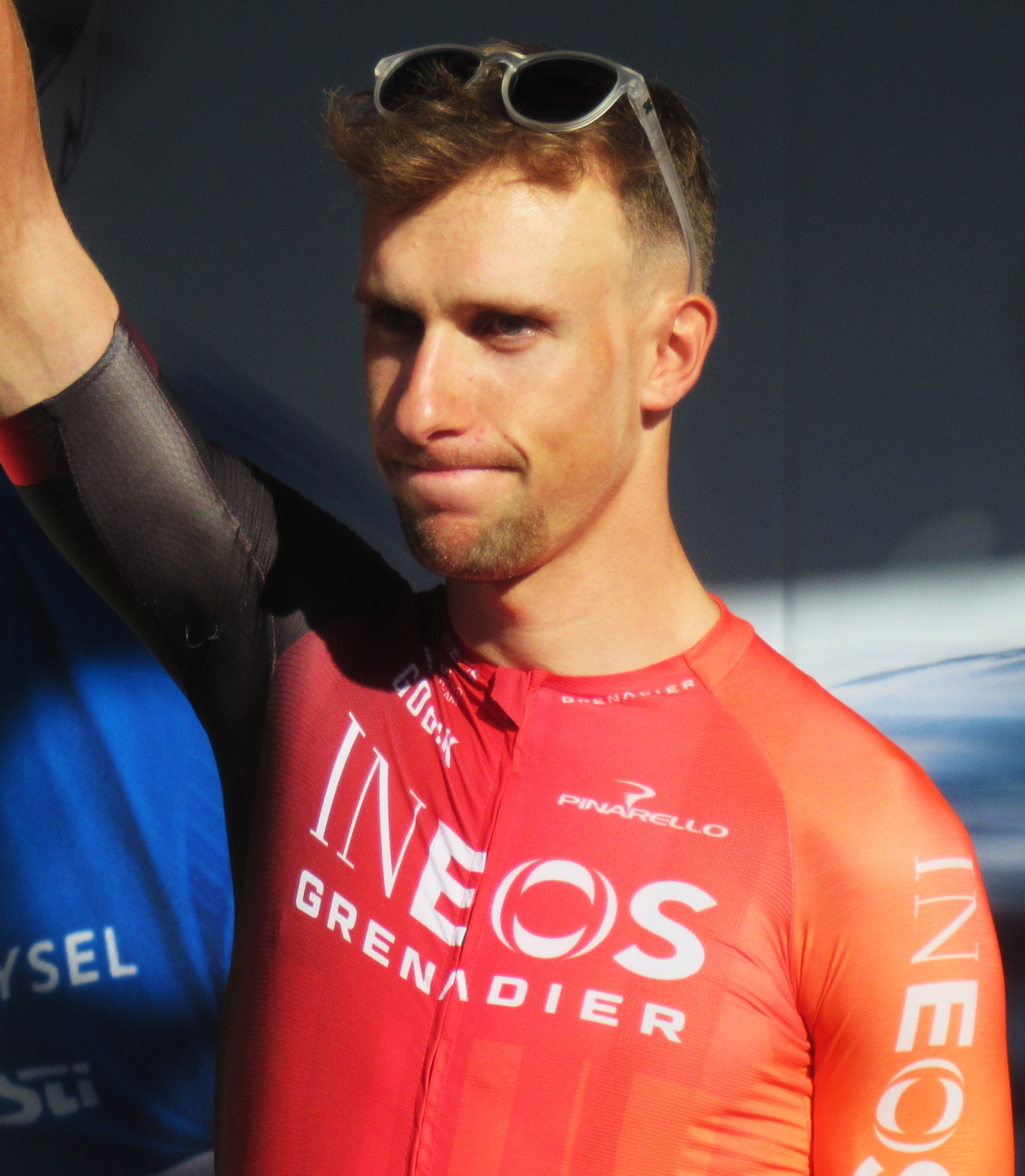
- Laurance in 2025

Personal information
- Born: 13 April 2001 (age 25)
- Height: 1.79 m (5 ft 10 in)
- Weight: 66 kg (146 lb)

Cycling career
- Sport: Cycling
- Current team: Netcompany–Ineos
- Disciplines: Road; Cyclo-cross
- Role: Rider
- Rider type: Puncheur

Amateur teams
- 2017: EC Quéven
- 2018: Véloce Vannetais
- 2019: AC Lanester 56
- 2020–2021: VC Pays de Loudéac
- 2021: B&B Hotels p/b KTM (stagiaire)

Professional teams
- 2022: B&B Hotels–KTM
- 2023: Alpecin–Deceuninck Development Team
- 2024: Alpecin–Deceuninck
- 2025–: INEOS Grenadiers

Major wins
- Stage races Tour of Norway (2024)
Medal record
Representing France
Men's road bicycle racing
World Championships
| Gold medal – first place | 2023 Glasgow | Under-23 road race |

Axel Laurance (born 13 April 2001) is a French cyclist, who currently rides for UCI WorldTeam Netcompany–Ineos.

== Career ==
=== Early career ===
Laurance started cycling at an early age, initially partaking in BMX, before moving to other disciplines including road, track and cyclo-cross. As a junior rider in 2019, he won stages of the Ronde des Vallées and the Grand Prix Rüebliland.

In 2020, he joined the Vélo Club Pays de Loudéac, the development squad for B&B Hotels p/b KTM. In June 2021, he finished third overall in the Under-23 Peace Race with the French national team, having won the last stage in a small group sprint.

=== B&B Hotels–KTM (2022) ===
In August 2021, he joined UCI ProTeam B&B Hotels–KTM as a stagiaire, and signed to ride with the team full time in 2022.

In August 2022, he finished second at the 2022 Bretagne Classic Ouest–France in his first year as a professional. A month later, he took his first pro win, outsprinting Jonathan Milan and Matej Mohorič on stage four of the CRO Race.

=== Alpecin–Deceuninck Development Team (2023) ===
At the end of 2022, B&B Hotels–KTM folded, forcing Laurance to find a new team. He was forced to step down to the UCI Continental level with Alpecin–Deceuninck Development Team, as their World Tour squad had already reached the maximum 30 riders. Laurance took several wins in 2023, most notably culminating with the World Under-23 Road Race Championships, winning after a 26 kilometer solo effort.

=== Alpecin–Deceuninck (2024) ===
In 2024, he officially joined UCI WorldTeam Alpecin–Deceuninck, taking an early season victory on stage two of the Étoile de Bessèges in February. In late March, he won his first UCI WorldTour level race on stage five of the Volta a Catalunya.

== Personal life ==
Laurance comes from a family of cyclists: he is the son of Franck Laurance, who was a professional cyclist in 1995 and 1996, and Manuella Le Cavil, a three-time Brittany regional champion. His sister Typhaine Laurance is also a cyclist.

== Major results ==
2018
1st Overall Penn Ar Bed-Pays d'Iroise
1st Tour du Morbihan Juniors
1st Stage 2a (TTT) Aubel–Thimister–Stavelot
6th Overall Sint-Martinusprijs Kontich
2019
1st Road race, Brittany Junior Championships
1st Tour du Morbihan Juniors
5th Overall Ronde des Vallées

1st Stage 1

7th Overall Aubel–Thimister–Stavelot

1st Stage 2a (TTT)

10th Overall Grand Prix Rüebliland

1st Stage 1

2020
1st Stage 4a Circuit des Plages Vendéennes (TTT)
2021
1st Stage 3 La SportBreizh
8th Overall Course de la Paix U23

1st Stage 3

2022 (1 pro win)
2nd Bretagne Classic
5th Overall CRO Race

1st Stage 4

10th Overall Tour de Bretagne
2023
1st Road race, UCI Road World Under-23 Championships
1st Stage 4 Tour Alsace
3rd Tour of Leuven
5th Overall Circuit des Ardennes

1st Stage 1

9th Veneto Classic
2024 (4)
1st Overall Tour of Norway

1st Stage 2

1st Stage 5 Volta a Catalunya
1st Stage 2 Étoile de Bessèges
2025
5th Road race, National Road Championships
5th Clásica Jaén Paraíso Interior
8th Liège–Bastogne–Liège
8th Grand Prix La Marseillaise
2026 (4)
1st Stage 3 Tour of the Basque Country
1st Stage 3 Tour de la Provence
2nd Overall Settimana Internazionale di Coppi e Bartali

1st Stages 1 & 4
