= 2024 UCI Road World Championships =

Cycling world championships

- Location within Switzerland
- Venue: Zürich, Switzerland
- Date: 22–29 September 2024
- Coordinates: 47°21′55.9″N 8°32′43.7″E
- Events: 13

The 2024 UCI Road World Championships was the 97th edition of the UCI Road World Championships, the annual world championships for road bicycle racing. It was held between 22 and 29 September 2024 in Zürich, Switzerland, alongside the UCI Para-cycling Road World Championships.

A total of thirteen events were held, consisting of six road races, six individual time trials and a team time trial mixed relay (all of them finishing in Zürich in front of Sechseläutenplatz).

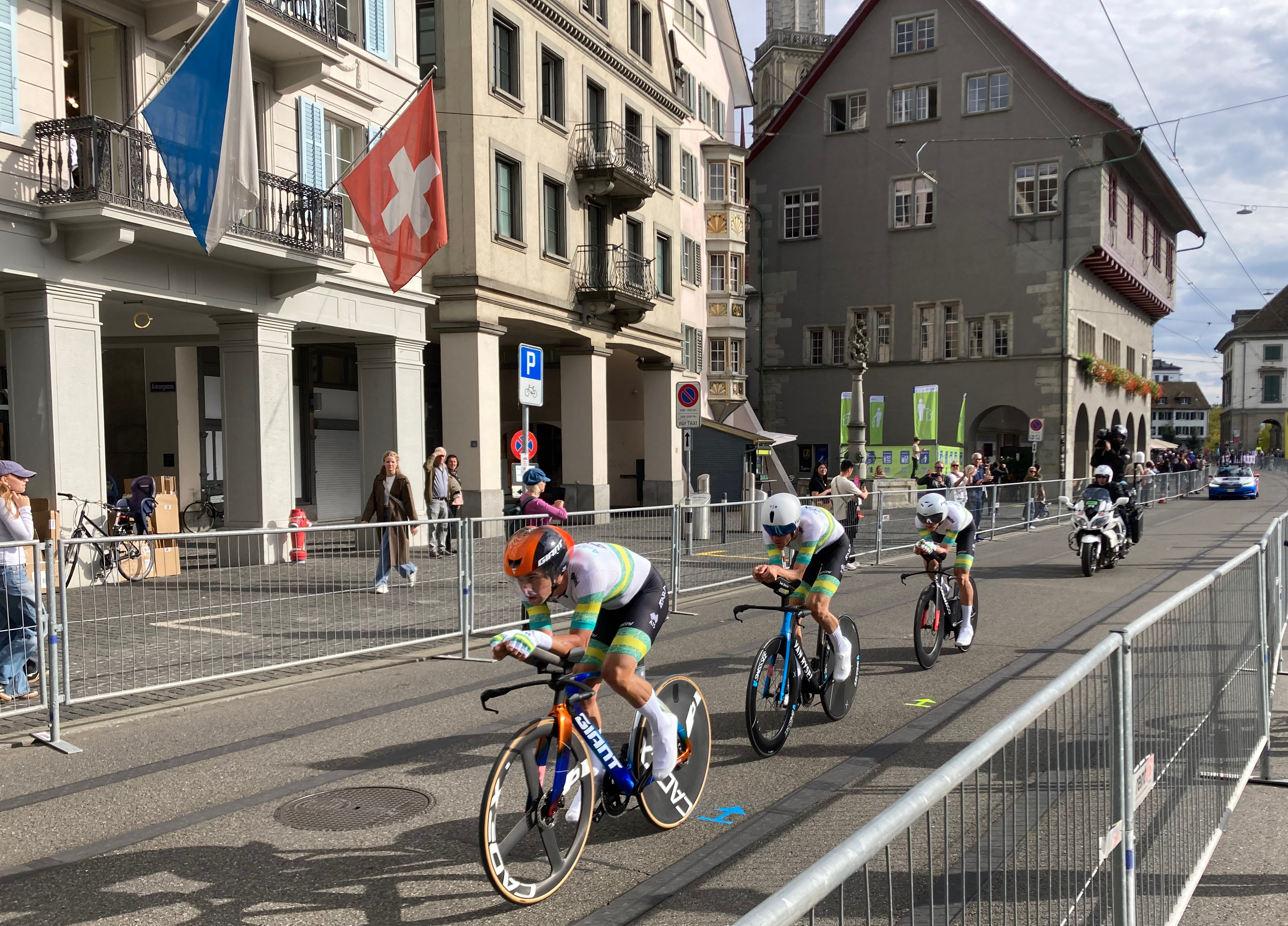
The Australian men cycle down Limmatquai in the mixed relay.

The event was overshadowed by a fatality in competition, as 18-year-old Swiss rider Muriel Furrer died from injuries sustained in a race crash during the junior women's road race. The event was continued at the express request of Muriel Furrer's parents and family, with a series of tributes and memorials.

Tadej Pogačar completed the rare Triple Crown of Cycling, winning the Giro d'Italia and the Tour de France before winning the Men's Road Race, and was only the third cyclist to achieve it following Eddy Merckx in 1974 and Stephen Roche in 1987.

== Schedule ==
All times listed below are for the local time – Central European Summer Time or UTC+02:00.

=== Road races ===
Date	Timings		Event	Location (start)	Location (finish)	Distance	Laps (Note: This denotes the number of full laps completed of the 26.85-kilometre (16.68-mile) Zürich circuit.)
26 September	10:00	12:00	Junior women	Uster	Zürich	73.6 km (45.7 mi)	1
26 September	14:15	17:15	Junior men	Uster	Zürich	127.2 km (79.0 mi)	3
27 September	12:45	16:45	Under-23 men	Uster	Zürich	173.6 km (107.9 mi)	4
28 September	12:45	16:45	Elite women	Uster	Zürich	154.1 km (95.8 mi)	4
28 September	12:45	16:45	Under-23 women (Note: These events are held within the elite women's events.)	Uster	Zürich	154.1 km (95.8 mi)	4
29 September	10:30	17:00	Elite men	Winterthur	Zürich	273.9 km (170.2 mi)	7

=== Mixed event ===
Date	Timings		Event	Location (start)	Location (finish)	Distance	Laps (Note: This denotes the number of laps of the 26.85-kilometre (16.68-mile) circuit; the first lap is completed by three male riders, with the second lap completed by three female riders.)
25 September	14:00	17:30	Mixed team relay	Zürich		53.7 km (33.4 mi)	2

=== Individual time trials ===
Date	Timings		Event	Location (start)	Location (finish)	Distance
22 September	12:00	14:15	Elite women	Gossau	Zürich	29.9 km (18.6 mi)
22 September	12:00	14:15	Under-23 women	Gossau	Zürich	29.9 km (18.6 mi)
22 September	14:45	17:30	Elite men	Zürich (Oerlikon)	Zürich	46.1 km (28.6 mi)
23 September	09:15	11:30	Junior men	Zürich	Zürich	24.9 km (15.5 mi)
23 September	14:45	17:30	Under-23 men	Gossau	Zürich	29.9 km (18.6 mi)
24 September	08:30	10:30	Junior women	Zürich	Zürich	18.8 km (11.7 mi)

== Medal summary ==
=== Elite events ===
Event	Gold		Silver		Bronze	
Men's Events
Men's road race	Tadej Pogačar; Slovenia	6h 27' 30"	Ben O'Connor; Australia	+ 34"	Mathieu van der Poel; Netherlands	+ 58"
Men's time trial	Remco Evenepoel; Belgium	53' 01.98"	Filippo Ganna; Italy	+ 6.43"	Edoardo Affini; Italy	+ 54.44"
Women's Events
Women's road race	Lotte Kopecky; Belgium	4h 05' 26"	Chloé Dygert; United States	s.t.	Elisa Longo Borghini; Italy	s.t.
Women's time trial	Grace Brown; Australia	39' 16.04"	Demi Vollering; Netherlands	+ 16.79"	Chloé Dygert; United States	+ 56.42"
Mixed Event
Mixed relay	Australia; Michael Matthews; Ben O'Connor; Jay Vine; Grace Brown; Brodie Chapman; Ruby Roseman-Gannon	1h 12' 52.28"	Germany; Marco Brenner; Miguel Heidemann; Maximilian Schachmann; Franziska Koch; Liane Lippert; Antonia Niedermaier	+ 0.85"	Italy; Edoardo Affini; Mattia Cattaneo; Filippo Ganna; Elisa Longo Borghini; Soraya Paladin; Gaia Realini	+ 8.25"

=== Under-23 events ===
Event	Gold		Silver		Bronze	
Men's Under-23 Events
Men's under-23 road race	Niklas Behrens; Germany	3h 57' 24"	Martin Svrček; Slovakia	s.t.	Alec Segaert; Belgium	+ 28"
Men's under-23 time trial	Iván Romeo; Spain	36' 42.70"	Jakob Söderqvist; Sweden	+ 32.05"	Jan Christen; Switzerland	+ 40.68"
Women's Under-23 Events
Women's under-23 road race	Puck Pieterse; Netherlands	4h 08' 26"	Neve Bradbury; Australia	s.t.	Antonia Niedermaier; Germany	s.t.
Women's under-23 time trial	Antonia Niedermaier; Germany	40' 21.14"	Jasmin Liechti; Switzerland	+ 2' 11.69"	Julie De Wilde; Belgium	+ 2' 16.75"

=== Junior events ===
Event	Gold		Silver		Bronze	
Men's Juniors Events
Men's junior road race	Lorenzo Finn; Italy	2h 57' 05"	Sebastian Grindley; Great Britain	+ 2' 05"	Senna Remijn; Netherlands	+ 3' 06"
Men's junior time trial	Paul Seixas; France	28' 08.43"	Jasper Schoofs; Belgium	+ 6.31"	Matisse Van Kerckhove; Belgium	+ 7.13"
Women's Juniors Events
Women's junior road race	Cat Ferguson; Great Britain	1h 54' 48"	Paula Ostiz Taco; Spain	s.t.	Viktória Chladoňová; Slovakia	s.t.
Women's junior time trial	Cat Ferguson; Great Britain	23' 49.72"	Viktória Chladoňová; Slovakia	+ 34.30"	Imogen Wolff; Great Britain	+ 36.60"

== Medal table ==
* Host nation (Switzerland)

Rank	Nation	Gold	Silver	Bronze	Total
1	Australia	2	2	0	4
2	Belgium	2	1	3	6
3	Germany	2	1	1	4
3	Great Britain	2	1	1	4
5	Italy	1	1	3	5
6	Netherlands	1	1	2	4
7	Spain	1	1	0	2
8	France	1	0	0	1
8	Slovenia	1	0	0	1
10	Slovakia	0	2	1	3
11	Switzerland*	0	1	1	2
11	United States	0	1	1	2
13	Sweden	0	1	0	1
Totals (13 entries)		13	13	13	39
