= Henrik Pedersen (cyclist) =

Danish cyclist

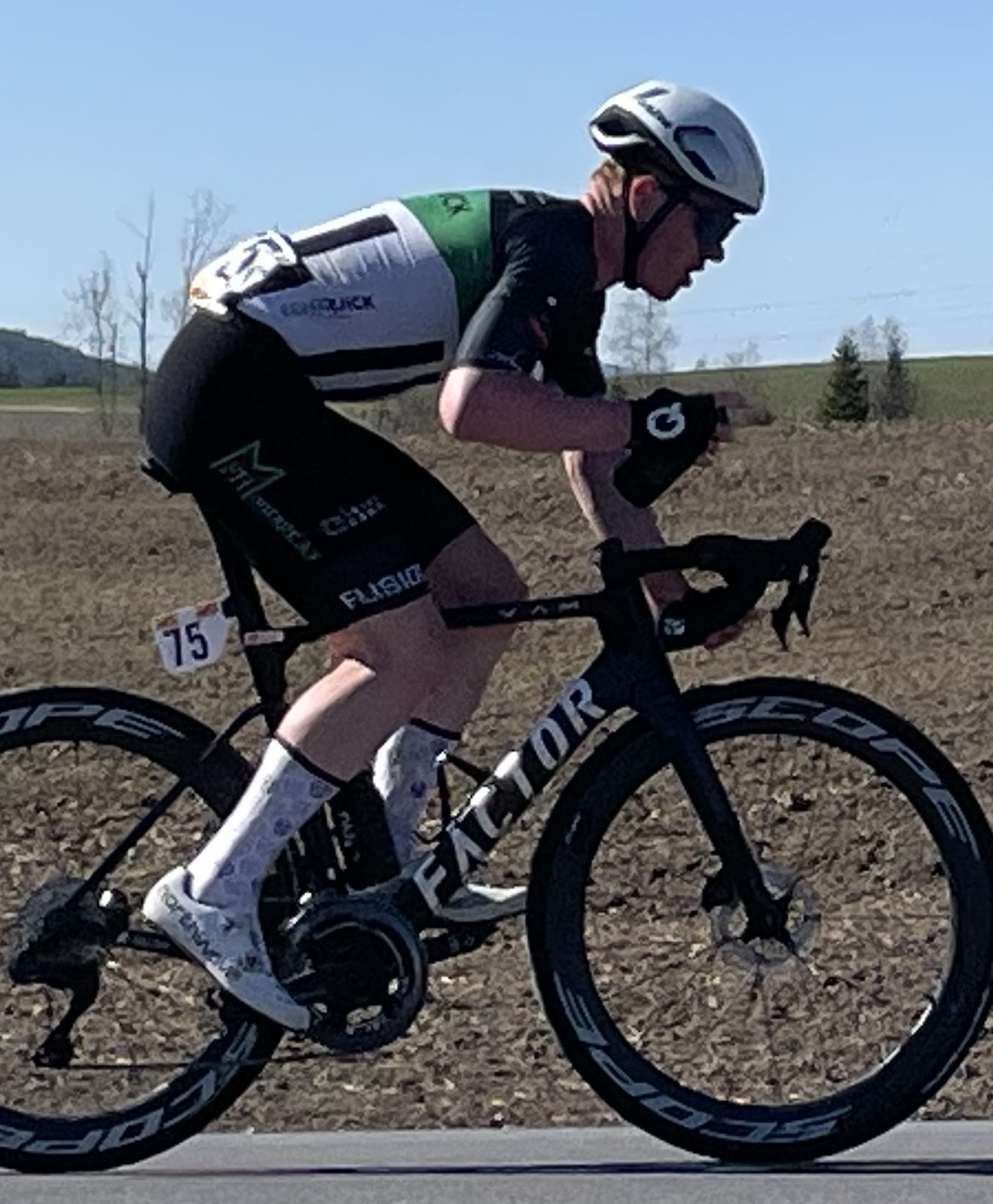
- Pedersen in 2023

Personal information
- Full name: Henrik Breiner Pedersen
- Born: 3 December 2004 (age 21) Sønder Felding, Denmark
- Height: 1.81 m (5 ft 11 in)

Cycling career
- Sport: Cycling
- Current team: Uno-X Mobility
- Discipline: Road
- Role: Rider

Amateur team
- 2021–2022: NPV–Carl Ras Roskilde Junior

Professional teams
- 2023: Team ColoQuick
- 2024: Uno-X Mobility Development Team
- 2025–: Uno-X Mobility

Major wins
- One-day races and Classics Flandrien 0.0 Classic (2026)
Medal record
Representing Denmark
Men's road bicycle racing
European Championships
Gold medal – first place	2023 Drenthe	Under-23 road race

Henrik Breiner Pedersen (born 3 December 2004) is a Danish cyclist, who currently rides for UCI ProTeam Uno-X Mobility. He won the under-23 road race at the 2023 European Road Championships.

== Major results ==
2022
National Junior Road Championships

1st Road race
2nd Time trial

1st Overall SPIE Internationale Juniorendriedaagse

1st Mountains classification
1st Stage 3

1st Omloop van Borsele
1st Points classification, Tour du Pays de Vaud
2023
1st Road race, UEC European Under-23 Road Championships
3rd Road race, National Under-23 Road Championships
2024
1st Stage 2 Tour de l'Avenir
2nd Time trial, National Under-23 Road Championships
3rd Dorpenomloop Rucphen
4th Overall Olympia's Tour
10th GP Herning
2025
5th Road race, National Road Championships
2026 (1 pro win)
1st Flandrien 0.0 Classic
3rd Overall Danmark Rundt

1st Young rider classification
