= Artem Shmidt =

American cyclist

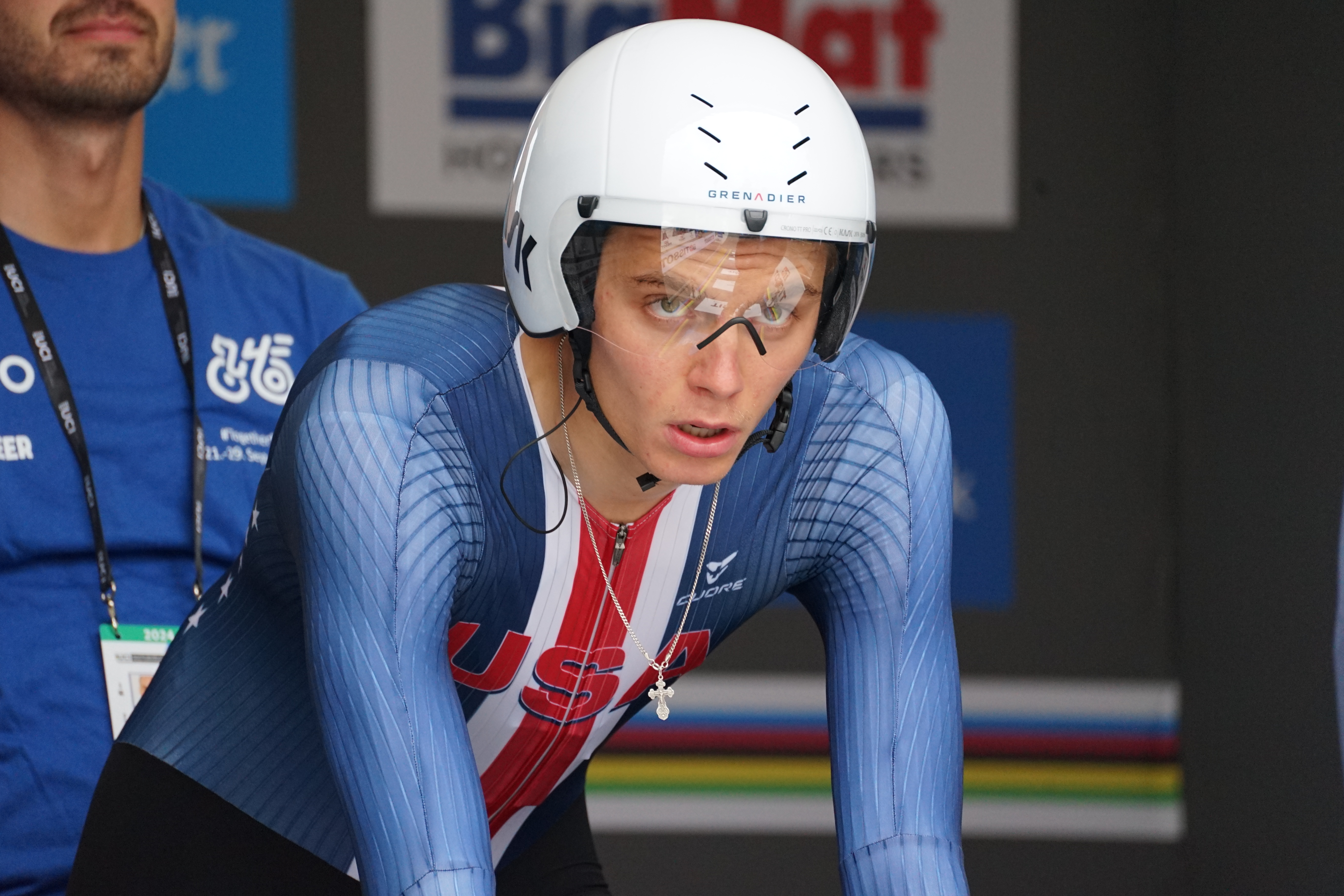
- Shmidt during the 2024 World Championships

Personal information
- Born: January 30, 2004 (age 22)
- Height: 191 cm (6 ft 3 in)
- Weight: 76 kg (168 lb)

Cycling career
- Sport: Cycling
- Current team: Netcompany–Ineos
- Discipline: Road
- Role: Rider

Amateur team
- 2022: Hot Tubes Development Cycling Team

Professional teams
- 2023–2024: Hagens Berman Axeon
- 2024–: INEOS Grenadiers

Major wins
- One-day races and Classics National Time Trial Championships (2025, 2026) Classique Dunkerque (2026)

Artem Shmidt (born 30 January 2004) is an American road racing cyclist, who currently rides for UCI WorldTeam Netcompany–Ineos. In 2025, he won the elite time trial race at the USA Cycling Pro Road National Championships.

== Early life ==
From Cumming, Georgia, he won age-group US amateur road titles on the road, time trial and criterium as a 12 year-old. In 2021, he finished third in the road race at US Men’s Junior National Road Race Championships.

== Career ==
In 2022, he finished in fifth place in the junior road race and sixth place in the junior time trial at the 2022 UCI Road World Championships, held in Wollongong, Australia.

He was signed by Hagens Berman Axeon for the 2023 season. In October 2023, riding for Hagens Berman Axeon, he won his first UCI classified 2.2 race with victory on the first stage of the Istrian Spring Trophy.

In May 2024, he won the U23 time trial at the United States National Road Race Championships. In August 2024, he signed for INEOS Grenadiers, with Schmidt riding the 2024 Tour de l'Avenir for the US national team before joining Ineos full time.

In May 2025, he won the elite time trial race at the USA Cycling Pro Road National Championships.

== Major results ==
2021
1st Overall SPIE Internationale Juniorendriedaagse

1st Young rider classification
1st Stage 1

National Junior Road Championships

3rd Road race
4th Time trial

4th Grand Prix Bob Jungels
2022
National Junior Road Championships

2nd Road race
2nd Time trial

3rd Overall SPIE Internationale Juniorendriedaagse
4th Overall Junioren Rundfahrt

1st Mountains classification
1st Stage 3

UCI Junior Road World Championships

5th Road race
6th Time trial

6th Kuurne–Brussels–Kuurne Junioren
8th Grand Prix Bob Jungels
2023
1st Stage 1 Istrian Spring Trophy
3rd Coppa della Pace
4th Overall Vuelta Junior a la Ribera del Duero

1st Mountains classification

2024
1st Time trial, National Under-23 Road Championships
5th Coppa della Pace
8th Time trial, UCI Road World Under-23 Championships
2025 (1 pro win)
1st Time trial, National Road Championships
2026 (2)
1st Time trial, National Road Championships
1st Classique Dunkerque
9th Overall Four Days of Dunkirk
