= Iván Romeo =

Spanish cyclist (born 2003)

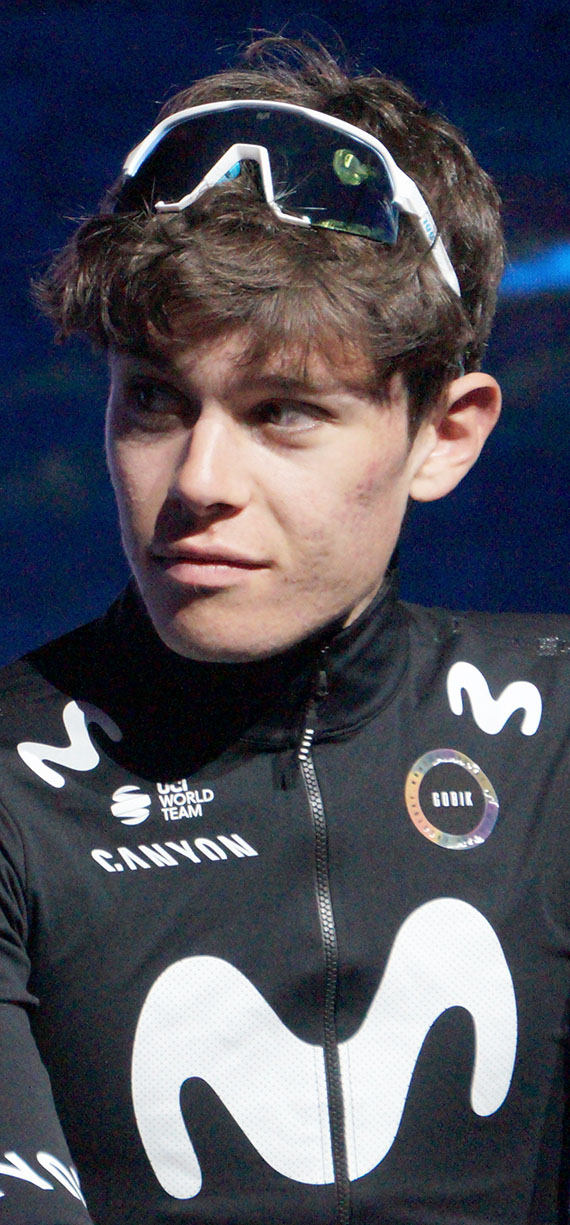
- Romeo in 2023

Personal information
- Born: 16 August 2003 (age 23) Valladolid, Spain
- Height: 1.93 m (6 ft 4 in)
- Weight: 75 kg (165 lb)

Cycling career
- Sport: Cycling
- Current team: Movistar Team
- Discipline: Road
- Role: Rider

Amateur team
- 2020–2021: MMR Cycling Academy

Professional teams
- 2022: Hagens Berman Axeon
- 2023–: Movistar Team

Major wins
- Stage races Vuelta a Andalucía (2026) One-day races and Classics National Road Race Championships (2025)
Medal record
Men's road bicycle racing
Representing Spain
World Championships
Gold medal – first place	2024 Zurich	Under-23 time trial
European Championships
Silver medal – second place	2023 Drenthe	Under-23 road race

Iván Romeo Abad (born 16 August 2003) is a Spanish cyclist, who currently rides for UCI WorldTeam Movistar Team.

== Major results ==
2020
4th Time trial, National Junior Road Championships
2021
National Junior Road Championships

1st Road race
1st Time trial

1st Stage 1 Vuelta al Besaya
2022
7th Overall International Tour of Rhodes

1st Young rider classification

8th Time trial, UEC European Under-23 Road Championships
9th Overall Flanders Tomorrow Tour
2023
1st Stage 5 Tour de l'Avenir
UEC European Under-23 Road Championships

2nd Road race
4th Time trial

8th Road race, UCI Road World Under-23 Championships
2024
UCI Road World Under-23 Championships

1st Time trial
9th Road race

7th Trofeo Serra de Tramuntana
9th Overall AlUla Tour
2025 (3 pro wins)
National Road Championships

1st Road race
4th Time trial

1st Stage 3 Critérium du Dauphiné
4th Overall UAE Tour

1st Young rider classification

8th Overall Volta a la Comunitat Valenciana

1st Stage 3

2026 (3)
1st Overall Vuelta a Andalucía

1st Stage 2

3rd Overall Tour de Pologne
4th Clásica Jaén Paraíso Interior
5th Overall O Gran Camiño

1st Stage 3

UEC European Road Championships

5th Road race
10th Time trial

8th Trofeo Andratx–Pollença
