= Jan Christen =

Swiss cyclist (born 2004)

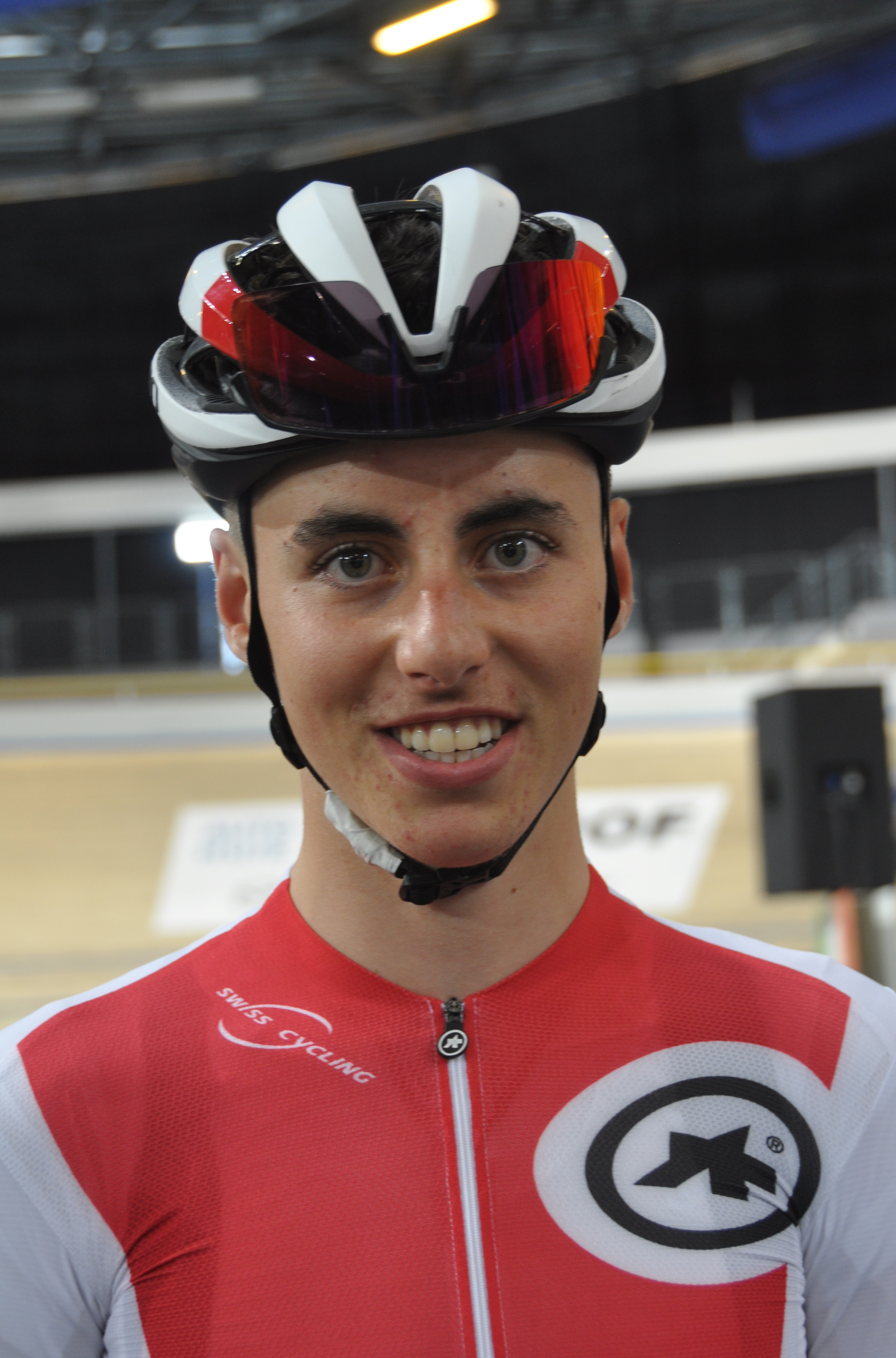
- Christen in 2021

Personal information
- Born: 26 June 2004 (age 22) Gippingen, Switzerland

Cycling career
- Sport: Cycling
- Current team: UAE Team Emirates XRG
- Disciplines: Road; Cyclo-cross; Mountain biking
- Role: Rider
- Rider type: Puncheur

Amateur teams
- 2017–2022: Veloclub Gippingen
- 2022: Pogi Team

Professional teams
- 2023: Hagens Berman Axeon
- 2023–: UAE Team Emirates

Major wins
- Stage races AlUla Tour (2026) One-day races and Classics National Road Race Championships (2026) National Time Trial Championships (2026)
Medal record
Representing Switzerland
Men's road bicycle racing
World Championships
Bronze medal – third place	2024 Zurich	Under-23 time trial
Bronze medal – third place	2025 Kigali	Mixed team relay
European Championships
Gold medal – first place	2022 Anadia	Junior road race
Bronze medal – third place	2025 Guilherand-Granges	Mixed team relay
Men's cyclo-cross
World Championships
Gold medal – first place	2022 Fayetteville	Junior
Men's mountain bike racing
World Championships
Silver medal – second place	2022 Les Gets	Junior cross-country

Jan Christen (born 26 June 2004) is a Swiss racing cyclist, who currently rides for UCI WorldTeam UAE Team Emirates XRG. His older brother Fabio is also a professional cyclist. He joined UAE Team Emirates XRG early on 1 August 2023, having initially been due to ride with them starting in 2024 on a five-year contract.

== Major results ==
=== Cyclo-cross ===
2020–2021
1st National Junior Championships
Junior EKZ CrossTour

2nd Baden

2021–2022
1st UCI World Junior Championships
1st National Junior Championships
1st Junior Pétange
1st Junior Meilen
1st Junior Hittnau
1st Junior Illnau
1st Junior Munich
2022–2023
2nd National Under-23 Championships

=== Mountain bike ===
2021
1st Cross-country, National Junior Championships
Junior Swiss Bike Cup

2nd Savognin

2022
1st Cross-country, National Junior Championships
Junior Swiss Bike Cup

1st Rickenbach
1st Savognin
2nd Basel

2nd Cross-country, UCI World Junior Championships
UCI Junior Series

2nd Albstadt

=== Road ===
2021
1st Time trial, National Junior Championships
1st Stage 1 Tour du Valromey
6th Road race, UEC European Junior Championships
7th Time trial, UCI World Junior Championships
8th Overall Grand Prix Rüebliland
2022
UEC European Junior Championships

1st Road race
5th Time trial

National Junior Championships

1st Time trial
2nd Road race

1st Overall Tour du Pays de Vaud

1st Stage 3

3rd Overall Tour du Valromey
4th Time trial, UCI World Junior Championships
2023
1st Championnats d'Europe des Grimpeurs U23
2nd Trofej Umag
7th Overall Giro Next Gen

1st Stage 7

7th Overall Tour de l'Avenir
8th Liège–Bastogne–Liège Espoirs
9th Time trial, UCI World Under-23 Championships
2024 (3 pro wins)
1st Giro dell'Appennino
1st Prueba Villafranca de Ordizia
1st Stage 2 Giro d'Abruzzo
2nd Milano–Torino
UCI World Under-23 Championships

3rd Time trial
4th Road race

3rd Time trial, National Championships
5th Trofeo Laigueglia
9th Clásica de San Sebastián
2025 (2)
1st Trofeo Calvià
2nd Clásica de San Sebastián
3rd Team relay, UCI World Championships
3rd Overall Tour of Norway
3rd GP Gippingen
4th Overall Tour de Pologne
5th Road race, National Championships
5th Clàssica Comunitat Valenciana 1969
9th Coppa Sabatini
10th Overall Volta ao Algarve

1st Stage 2

2026 (5)
National Championships

1st Road race
1st Time trial

1st Overall AlUla Tour

1st Young rider classification
1st Stage 5

2nd Ardèche Classic
4th Overall Vuelta a Andalucía

1st Young rider classification

6th Overall Tour de Pologne

1st Stage 5

6th Strade Bianche
7th Clásica de San Sebastián
Giro d'Italia

Held after Stage 4

=== Track ===
2021
1st Omnium, National Junior Championships
2022
1st Individual pursuit, National Junior Championships
