= List of 2026 UCI WorldTeams and riders =

This page is a list of 2026 UCI WorldTeams. These 18 teams are competing in the 2026 UCI World Tour.

== Teams overview ==
2026 UCI World Teams
Code	Official Team Name	Country	Continent
APT	Alpecin–Premier Tech	Belgium	Europe
DCT	Decathlon CMA CGM	France	Europe
EFE	EF Education–EasyPost	United States	North America
GFC	Groupama–FDJ United	France	Europe
LTK	Lidl–Trek	Germany	Europe
LOI	Lotto–Intermarché	Belgium	Europe
MOV	Movistar Team	Spain	Europe
NCI	Netcompany INEOS	United Kingdom	Europe
NSN	NSN Cycling Team	Switzerland	Europe
RBH	Red Bull–Bora–Hansgrohe	Germany	Europe
SOQ	Soudal–Quick-Step	Belgium	Europe
TBV	Team Bahrain Victorious	Bahrain	Asia
JAY	Team Jayco–AlUla	Australia	Oceania
TPP	Team Picnic–PostNL	Netherlands	Europe
TVL	Visma–Lease a Bike	Netherlands	Europe
UEX	UAE Team Emirates XRG	United Arab Emirates	Asia
UXM	Uno-X Mobility	Norway	Europe
XAT	XDS Astana Team	Kazakhstan	Asia

== Riders ==
=== Alpecin–Premier Tech ===
As of 24 December 2025

Rider	Date of birth
Maurice Ballerstedt (GER)	16 January 2001 (aged 24)
Tobias Bayer (AUT)	17 November 1999 (aged 26)
Lennert Belmans (BEL)	15 February 2002 (aged 23)
Francesco Busatto (ITA)	1 November 2002 (aged 23)
Lindsay De Vylder (BEL)	30 May 1995 (aged 30)
Ramses Debruyne (BEL)	31 August 2002 (aged 23)
Simon Dehairs (BEL)	4 June 2001 (aged 24)
Tibor Del Grosso (NED)	27 July 2003 (aged 22)
Silvan Dillier (SUI)	3 August 1990 (aged 35)
Aaron Dockx (BEL)	28 June 2004 (aged 21)
Jonas Geens (BEL)	4 January 1999 (aged 26)
Gal Glivar (SLO)	1 May 2002 (aged 23)
Michael Gogl (AUT)	4 November 1993 (aged 32)
Kaden Groves (AUS)	23 December 1998 (aged 27)
Hugo Houle (CAN)	27 September 1990 (aged 35)

Rider	Date of birth
Tim Marsman (NED)	4 October 2000 (aged 25)
Jasper Philipsen (BEL)	2 March 1998 (aged 27)
Edward Planckaert (BEL)	1 February 1995 (aged 30)
Jensen Plowright (AUS)	15 May 2000 (aged 25)
Johan Price-Pejtersen (DEN)	26 May 1999 (aged 26)
Senna Remijn (NED)	22 January 2006 (aged 19)
Jonas Rickaert (BEL)	7 February 1994 (aged 31)
Oscar Riesebeek (NED)	23 December 1992 (aged 33)
Florian Sénéchal (FRA)	10 July 1993 (aged 32)
Sente Sentjens (BEL)	2 September 2005 (aged 20)
Gerben Thijssen (BEL)	21 June 1998 (aged 27)
Henri Uhlig (GER)	1 August 2001 (aged 24)
Mathieu van der Poel (NED)	19 January 1995 (aged 30)
Luca Vergallito (ITA)	14 September 1997 (aged 28)
Emiel Verstrynge (BEL)	4 February 2002 (aged 23)

=== Decathlon–CMA CGM ===
As of 24 December 2025

Rider	Date of birth
Tobias Lund Andresen (DEN)	20 August 2002 (aged 23)
Tiesj Benoot (BEL)	11 March 1994 (aged 31)
Léo Bisiaux (FRA)	14 February 2005 (aged 20)
Stefan Bissegger (SUI)	13 September 1998 (aged 27)
Cees Bol (NED)	27 July 1995 (aged 30)
Oscar Chamberlain (AUS)	15 January 2005 (aged 20)
Sander De Pestel (BEL)	11 October 1998 (aged 27)
Stan Dewulf (BEL)	20 December 1997 (aged 28)
Felix Gall (AUT)	27 February 1998 (aged 27)
Pierre Gautherat (FRA)	16 January 2003 (aged 22)
Robbe Ghys (BEL)	11 January 1997 (aged 28)
Tord Gudmestad (NOR)	8 May 2001 (aged 24)
Daan Hoole (NED)	22 February 1999 (aged 26)
Noa Isidore (FRA)	17 September 2004 (aged 21)

Rider	Date of birth
Olav Kooij (NED)	17 October 2001 (aged 24)
Antoine L'Hote (FRA)	27 May 2005 (aged 20)
Jordan Labrosse (FRA)	15 September 2002 (aged 23)
Paul Lapeira (FRA)	25 May 2000 (aged 25)
Gregor Mühlberger (AUT)	4 April 1994 (aged 31)
Oliver Naesen (BEL)	16 September 1990 (aged 35)
Aurélien Paret-Peintre (FRA)	27 February 1996 (aged 29)
Rasmus Søjberg Pedersen (DEN)	9 July 2002 (aged 23)
Gianluca Pollefliet (BEL)	28 January 2002 (aged 23)
Nicolas Prodhomme (FRA)	1 February 1997 (aged 28)
Matthew Riccitello (USA)	5 March 2002 (aged 23)
Callum Scotson (AUS)	10 August 1996 (aged 29)
Paul Seixas (FRA)	24 September 2006 (aged 19)
Johannes Staune-Mittet (NOR)	18 January 2002 (aged 23)

=== EF Education–EasyPost ===
As of 24 December 2025

Rider	Date of birth
Mattia Agostinacchio (ITA)	13 September 2007 (aged 18)
Vincenzo Albanese (ITA)	12 November 1996 (aged 29)
Kasper Asgreen (DEN)	8 February 1995 (aged 30)
Samuele Battistella (ITA)	14 November 1998 (aged 27)
Alex Baudin (FRA)	25 May 2001 (aged 24)
Markel Beloki (ESP)	27 July 2005 (aged 20)
Richard Carapaz (ECU)	29 May 1993 (aged 32)
Jefferson Alexander Cepeda (ECU)	16 June 1998 (aged 27)
Ben Healy (IRL)	11 September 2000 (aged 25)
Noah Hobbs (GBR)	23 July 2004 (aged 21)
Mikkel Frølich Honoré (DEN)	21 January 1997 (aged 28)
Luke Lamperti (USA)	31 December 2002 (aged 23)
Michael Leonard (CAN)	26 March 2004 (aged 21)
Alastair Mackellar (AUS)	20 January 2002 (aged 23)
Madis Mihkels (EST)	31 May 2003 (aged 22)

Rider	Date of birth
Lukas Nerurkar (GBR)	14 November 2003 (aged 22)
Neilson Powless (USA)	3 September 1996 (aged 29)
Sean Quinn (USA)	10 May 2000 (aged 25)
Darren Rafferty (IRL)	1 July 2003 (aged 22)
Archie Ryan (IRL)	16 November 2001 (aged 24)
Matthias Schwarzbacher (SVK)	22 December 2005 (aged 20)
James Shaw (GBR)	13 June 1996 (aged 29)
Colby Simmons (USA)	16 October 2003 (aged 22)
Georg Steinhauser (GER)	21 October 2001 (aged 24)
Harry Sweeny (AUS)	9 July 1998 (aged 27)
Michael Valgren (DEN)	7 February 1992 (aged 33)
Marijn van den Berg (NED)	19 July 1999 (aged 26)
Jardi Christiaan van der Lee (NED)	6 August 2001 (aged 24)
Max Walker (GBR)	12 July 2001 (aged 24)

=== Groupama–FDJ United ===
As of 25 December 2025

Rider	Date of birth
Cyril Barthe (FRA)	14 February 1996 (aged 29)
Clément Berthet (FRA)	2 August 1997 (aged 28)
Lewis Bower (NZL)	14 October 2004 (aged 21)
Clément Braz Afonso (FRA)	8 November 1999 (aged 26)
Rémi Cavagna (FRA)	10 August 1995 (aged 30)
Ewen Costiou (FRA)	10 November 2002 (aged 23)
Maxime Decomble (FRA)	16 July 2005 (aged 20)
Tom Donnenwirth (FRA)	19 January 1998 (aged 27)
Titouan Fontaine (FRA)	20 June 2005 (aged 20)
David Gaudu (FRA)	10 October 1996 (aged 29)
Kevin Geniets (LUX)	9 January 1997 (aged 28)
Lorenzo Germani (ITA)	3 March 2002 (aged 23)
Romain Grégoire (FRA)	21 January 2003 (aged 22)
Thibaud Gruel (FRA)	1 May 2004 (aged 21)
Axel Huens (FRA)	5 September 2001 (aged 24)

Rider	Date of birth
Johan Jacobs (SUI)	1 March 1997 (aged 28)
Josh Kench (NZL)	6 May 2001 (aged 24)
Olivier Le Gac (FRA)	27 August 1993 (aged 32)
Valentin Madouas (FRA)	12 July 1996 (aged 29)
Guillaume Martin (FRA)	9 June 1993 (aged 32)
Matteo Milan (ITA)	22 January 2003 (aged 22)
Rudy Molard (FRA)	17 September 1989 (aged 36)
Quentin Pacher (FRA)	6 January 1992 (aged 33)
Enzo Paleni (FRA)	30 May 2002 (aged 23)
Paul Penhoët (FRA)	28 December 2001 (aged 24)
Rémy Rochas (FRA)	18 May 1996 (aged 29)
Brieuc Rolland (FRA)	13 August 2003 (aged 22)
Clément Russo (FRA)	20 January 1995 (aged 30)
Bastien Tronchon (FRA)	29 March 2002 (aged 23)

=== Lidl–Trek ===
As of 25 December 2025

Rider	Date of birth
Juan Ayuso (ESP)	16 September 2002 (aged 23)
Andrea Bagioli (ITA)	23 March 1999 (aged 26)
Julien Bernard (FRA)	17 March 1992 (aged 33)
Giulio Ciccone (ITA)	20 December 1994 (aged 31)
Simone Consonni (ITA)	12 September 1994 (aged 31)
Tao Geoghegan Hart (GBR)	30 March 1995 (aged 30)
Amanuel Ghebreigzabhier (ERI)	17 August 1994 (aged 31)
Lennard Kämna (GER)	9 September 1996 (aged 29)
Patrick Konrad (AUT)	13 October 1991 (aged 34)
Søren Kragh Andersen (DEN)	10 August 1994 (aged 31)
Jonathan Milan (ITA)	1 October 2000 (aged 25)
Bauke Mollema (NED)	26 November 1986 (aged 39)
Jacopo Mosca (ITA)	29 August 1993 (aged 32)
Mathias Norsgaard (DEN)	5 May 1997 (aged 28)
Thibau Nys (BEL)	12 November 2002 (aged 23)

Rider	Date of birth
Sam Oomen (NED)	15 August 1995 (aged 30)
Mads Pedersen (DEN)	18 December 1995 (aged 30)
Quinn Simmons (USA)	8 May 2001 (aged 24)
Mattias Skjelmose (DEN)	26 September 2000 (aged 25)
Toms Skujiņš (LAT)	15 June 1991 (aged 34)
Matteo Sobrero (ITA)	14 May 1997 (aged 28)
Jakob Söderqvist (SWE)	31 May 2003 (aged 22)
Tim Torn Teutenberg (GER)	19 June 2002 (aged 23)
Edward Theuns (BEL)	30 April 1991 (aged 34)
Mathias Vacek (CZE)	12 June 2002 (aged 23)
Otto Vergaerde (BEL)	15 July 1994 (aged 31)
Carlos Verona (ESP)	4 November 1992 (aged 33)
Max Walscheid (GER)	13 June 1993 (aged 32)
Albert Withen Philipsen (DEN)	3 September 2006 (aged 19)

=== Lotto–Intermarché ===
As of 25 December 2025

Rider	Date of birth
Toon Aerts (BEL)	19 October 1993 (aged 32)
Huub Artz (NED)	14 May 2002 (aged 23)
Jenno Berckmoes (BEL)	4 February 2001 (aged 24)
Cedric Beullens (BEL)	27 January 1997 (aged 28)
Vito Braet (BEL)	2 November 2000 (aged 25)
Lars Craps (BEL)	17 October 2001 (aged 24)
Jasper De Buyst (BEL)	24 November 1993 (aged 32)
Arnaud De Lie (BEL)	16 March 2002 (aged 23)
Steffen De Schuyteneer (BEL)	24 February 2005 (aged 20)
Matthew Fox (AUS)	28 September 2002 (aged 23)
Joshua Giddings (GBR)	20 July 2003 (aged 22)
Sébastien Grignard (BEL)	29 April 1999 (aged 26)
Matys Grisel (FRA)	14 July 2005 (aged 20)
Simone Gualdi (ITA)	16 April 2005 (aged 20)
Mathieu Kockelmann (LUX)	31 January 2004 (aged 21)

Rider	Date of birth
Milan Menten (BEL)	31 October 1996 (aged 29)
Robin Orins (BEL)	6 March 2002 (aged 23)
Lorenzo Rota (ITA)	23 May 1995 (aged 30)
Jonas Rutsch (GER)	24 January 1998 (aged 27)
Liam Slock (BEL)	18 September 2000 (aged 25)
Lionel Taminiaux (BEL)	21 May 1996 (aged 29)
Reuben Thompson (NZL)	15 February 2001 (aged 24)
Luca Van Boven (BEL)	6 January 2000 (aged 25)
Taco van der Hoorn (NED)	4 December 1993 (aged 32)
Lennert Van Eetvelt (BEL)	17 July 2001 (aged 24)
Roel van Sintmaartensdijk (NED)	8 May 2001 (aged 24)
Baptiste Veistroffer (FRA)	29 May 2000 (aged 25)
Jarno Widar (BEL)	13 November 2005 (aged 20)
Georg Zimmermann (GER)	11 October 1997 (aged 28)
Felix Ørn-Kristoff (NOR)	15 March 2006 (aged 19)

=== Movistar Team ===
As of 25 December 2025

Rider	Date of birth
Roger Adrià (ESP)	18 April 1998 (aged 27)
Jorge Arcas (ESP)	8 July 1992 (aged 33)
Orluis Aular (VEN)	5 November 1996 (aged 29)
Jon Barrenetxea (ESP)	20 April 2000 (aged 25)
Carlos Canal (ESP)	28 June 2001 (aged 24)
Pablo Castrillo (ESP)	2 January 2001 (aged 24)
Jefferson Alveiro Cepeda (ECU)	2 March 1996 (aged 29)
Davide Formolo (ITA)	25 October 1992 (aged 33)
Iván García Cortina (ESP)	20 November 1995 (aged 30)
Raúl García Pierna (ESP)	23 February 2001 (aged 24)
Michel Hessmann (GER)	6 April 2001 (aged 24)
Juan Pedro López (ESP)	31 July 1997 (aged 28)
Enric Mas (ESP)	7 January 1995 (aged 30)
Lorenzo Milesi (ITA)	19 March 2002 (aged 23)

Rider	Date of birth
Manlio Moro (ITA)	17 March 2002 (aged 23)
Pavel Novák (CZE)	3 December 2004 (aged 21)
Nelson Oliveira (POR)	6 March 1989 (aged 36)
Diego Pescador (COL)	21 December 2004 (aged 21)
Nairo Quintana (COL)	4 February 1990 (aged 35)
Iván Romeo (ESP)	16 August 2003 (aged 22)
Javier Romo (ESP)	6 January 1999 (aged 26)
Einer Rubio (COL)	22 February 1998 (aged 27)
Pelayo Sánchez (ESP)	27 March 2000 (aged 25)
Gonzalo Serrano (ESP)	17 August 1994 (aged 31)
Natnael Tesfatsion (ERI)	23 May 1999 (aged 26)
Albert Torres (ESP)	26 April 1990 (aged 35)
Cian Uijtdebroeks (BEL)	28 February 2003 (aged 22)

=== Netcompany INEOS Cycling Team ===
As of 25 December 2025

Rider	Date of birth
Thymen Arensman (NED)	4 December 1999 (aged 26)
Andrew August (USA)	12 October 2005 (aged 20)
Egan Bernal (COL)	13 January 1997 (aged 28)
Laurens De Plus (BEL)	4 September 1995 (aged 30)
Tobias Foss (NOR)	25 May 1997 (aged 28)
Filippo Ganna (ITA)	25 July 1996 (aged 29)
Dorian Godon (FRA)	25 May 1996 (aged 29)
Jack Haig (AUS)	6 September 1993 (aged 32)
Lucas Hamilton (AUS)	12 February 1996 (aged 29)
Kim Heiduk (GER)	3 March 2000 (aged 25)
Bob Jungels (LUX)	22 September 1992 (aged 33)
Michał Kwiatkowski (POL)	2 June 1990 (aged 35)
Victor Langellotti (MON)	7 June 1995 (aged 30)
Axel Laurance (FRA)	13 April 2001 (aged 24)
Oscar Onley (GBR)	13 October 2002 (aged 23)

Rider	Date of birth
Brandon Rivera (COL)	21 March 1996 (aged 29)
Carlos Rodríguez (ESP)	2 February 2001 (aged 24)
Óscar Rodríguez (ESP)	6 May 1995 (aged 30)
Magnus Sheffield (USA)	19 April 2002 (aged 23)
Artem Shmidt (USA)	30 January 2004 (aged 21)
Embret Svestad-Bårdseng (NOR)	1 September 2002 (aged 23)
Ben Swift (GBR)	5 November 1987 (aged 38)
Connor Swift (GBR)	30 October 1995 (aged 30)
Joshua Tarling (GBR)	15 February 2004 (aged 21)
Ben Turner (GBR)	28 May 1999 (aged 26)
Kévin Vauquelin (FRA)	26 April 2001 (aged 24)
Samuel Watson (GBR)	24 September 2001 (aged 24)
Sam Welsford (AUS)	19 January 1996 (aged 29)
Peter Øxenberg (DEN)	23 October 2005 (aged 20)

=== NSN Cycling Team ===
As of 26 December 2025

Rider	Date of birth
Lewis Askey (GBR)	4 May 2001 (aged 24)
George Bennett (NZL)	7 April 1990 (aged 35)
Joseph Blackmore (GBR)	23 February 2003 (aged 22)
Guillaume Boivin (CAN)	25 May 1989 (aged 36)
Simon Clarke (AUS)	18 July 1986 (aged 39)
Pier-André Côté (CAN)	24 April 1997 (aged 28)
Itamar Einhorn (ISR)	20 September 1997 (aged 28)
Marco Frigo (ITA)	2 March 2000 (aged 25)
Brady Gilmore (AUS)	14 April 2001 (aged 24)
Biniam Girmay (ERI)	2 April 2000 (aged 25)
Jan Hirt (CZE)	21 January 1991 (aged 34)
Hugo Hofstetter (FRA)	13 February 1994 (aged 31)
Oded Kogut (ISR)	14 February 2001 (aged 24)
Matis Louvel (FRA)	19 July 1999 (aged 26)

Rider	Date of birth
Alexey Lutsenko (KAZ)	7 September 1992 (aged 33)
Pau Martí (ESP)	24 November 2004 (aged 21)
Ryan Mullen (IRL)	7 August 1994 (aged 31)
Krists Neilands (LAT)	18 August 1994 (aged 31)
Alessandro Pinarello (ITA)	12 July 2003 (aged 22)
Nadav Raisberg (ISR)	29 March 2001 (aged 24)
Nick Schultz (AUS)	13 September 1994 (aged 31)
Riley Sheehan (USA)	16 June 2000 (aged 25)
Jake Stewart (GBR)	2 October 1999 (aged 26)
Corbin Strong (NZL)	30 April 2000 (aged 25)
Tom Van Asbroeck (BEL)	19 April 1990 (aged 35)
Floris Van Tricht (BEL)	23 June 2001 (aged 24)
Ethan Vernon (GBR)	26 August 2000 (aged 25)
Stephen Williams (GBR)	9 June 1996 (aged 29)

=== Red Bull–Bora–Hansgrohe ===
As of 26 December 2025

Rider	Date of birth
Giovanni Aleotti (ITA)	25 May 1999 (aged 26)
Adrien Boichis (FRA)	2 January 2003 (aged 22)
Mattia Cattaneo (ITA)	25 October 1990 (aged 35)
Nico Denz (GER)	15 February 1994 (aged 31)
Jarrad Drizners (AUS)	31 May 1999 (aged 26)
Haimar Etxeberria (ESP)	8 September 2003 (aged 22)
Remco Evenepoel (BEL)	25 January 2000 (aged 25)
Finn Fisher-Black (NZL)	21 December 2001 (aged 24)
Alexander Hajek (AUT)	19 July 2003 (aged 22)
Emil Herzog (GER)	6 October 2004 (aged 21)
Jai Hindley (AUS)	5 May 1996 (aged 29)
Florian Lipowitz (GER)	21 September 2000 (aged 25)
Arne Marit (BEL)	21 January 1999 (aged 26)
Daniel Martínez (COL)	25 April 1996 (aged 29)
Jordi Meeus (BEL)	1 July 1998 (aged 27)

Rider	Date of birth
Gianni Moscon (ITA)	20 April 1994 (aged 31)
Giulio Pellizzari (ITA)	21 November 2003 (aged 22)
Laurence Pithie (NZL)	17 July 2002 (aged 23)
Primož Roglič (SLO)	29 October 1989 (aged 36)
Callum Thornley (GBR)	5 August 2003 (aged 22)
Jan Tratnik (SLO)	23 February 1990 (aged 35)
Luke Tuckwell (AUS)	21 June 2004 (aged 21)
Mick van Dijke (NED)	15 March 2000 (aged 25)
Tim van Dijke (NED)	15 March 2000 (aged 25)
Maxim Van Gils (BEL)	25 November 1999 (aged 26)
Danny van Poppel (NED)	26 July 1993 (aged 32)
Gianni Vermeersch (BEL)	19 November 1992 (aged 33)
Aleksandr Vlasov (RUS)	23 April 1996 (aged 29)
Frederik Wandahl (DEN)	9 May 2001 (aged 24)
Ben Zwiehoff (GER)	22 February 1994 (aged 31)

=== Soudal–Quick-Step ===
As of 26 December 2025

Rider	Date of birth
Ayco Bastiaens (BEL)	3 June 1996 (aged 29)
Steff Cras (BEL)	13 February 1996 (aged 29)
Alberto Dainese (ITA)	25 March 1998 (aged 27)
Pascal Eenkhoorn (NED)	8 February 1997 (aged 28)
Gianmarco Garofoli (ITA)	6 October 2002 (aged 23)
Gil Gelders (BEL)	16 December 2002 (aged 23)
Ethan Hayter (GBR)	18 September 1998 (aged 27)
Yves Lampaert (BEL)	10 April 1991 (aged 34)
Mikel Landa (ESP)	13 December 1989 (aged 36)
Junior Lecerf (BEL)	15 October 2002 (aged 23)
Paul Magnier (FRA)	14 April 2004 (aged 21)
Tim Merlier (BEL)	30 October 1992 (aged 33)
Valentin Paret-Peintre (FRA)	14 January 2001 (aged 24)
Casper Pedersen (DEN)	15 March 1996 (aged 29)
Andrea Raccagni Noviero (ITA)	26 January 2004 (aged 21)

Rider	Date of birth
Pepijn Reinderink (NED)	4 May 2002 (aged 23)
Laurenz Rex (BEL)	15 December 1999 (aged 26)
Maximilian Schachmann (GER)	9 January 1994 (aged 31)
Jasper Stuyven (BEL)	17 April 1992 (aged 33)
Martin Svrček (SVK)	17 February 2003 (aged 22)
Dylan van Baarle (NED)	21 May 1992 (aged 33)
Fabio Van den Bossche (BEL)	21 September 2000 (aged 25)
Dries Van Gestel (BEL)	30 September 1994 (aged 31)
Bert Van Lerberghe (BEL)	29 September 1992 (aged 33)
Ilan Van Wilder (BEL)	14 May 2000 (aged 25)
Warre Vangheluwe (BEL)	23 July 2001 (aged 24)
Mauri Vansevenant (BEL)	1 June 1999 (aged 26)
Louis Vervaeke (BEL)	6 October 1993 (aged 32)
Jonathan Vervenne (BEL)	27 May 2003 (aged 22)
Filippo Zana (ITA)	18 March 1999 (aged 26)

=== Team Bahrain Victorious ===
As of 24 December 2025

Rider	Date of birth
Nikias Arndt (GER)	18 November 1991 (aged 34)
Phil Bauhaus (GER)	8 July 1994 (aged 31)
Pello Bilbao (ESP)	25 February 1990 (aged 35)
Alessandro Borgo (ITA)	6 February 2005 (aged 20)
Alberto Bruttomesso (ITA)	30 October 2003 (aged 22)
Santiago Buitrago (COL)	26 September 1999 (aged 26)
Damiano Caruso (ITA)	12 October 1987 (aged 38)
Roman Ermakov (RUS)	6 October 2004 (aged 21)
Žak Eržen (SLO)	19 October 2005 (aged 20)
Afonso Eulálio (POR)	30 September 2001 (aged 24)
Matevž Govekar (SLO)	17 April 2000 (aged 25)
Kamil Gradek (POL)	17 September 1990 (aged 35)
Rainer Kepplinger (AUT)	19 August 1997 (aged 28)
Lenny Martinez (FRA)	11 July 2003 (aged 22)

Rider	Date of birth
Fran Miholjević (CRO)	2 August 2002 (aged 23)
Pau Miquel (ESP)	20 August 2000 (aged 25)
Matej Mohorič (SLO)	19 October 1994 (aged 31)
Jakob Omrzel (SLO)	21 March 2006 (aged 19)
Mathijs Paasschens (NED)	18 March 1996 (aged 29)
Alec Segaert (BEL)	16 January 2003 (aged 22)
Daniel Skerl (ITA)	21 March 2003 (aged 22)
Robert Stannard (AUS)	16 September 1998 (aged 27)
Oliver Stockwell (GBR)	7 June 2002 (aged 23)
Antonio Tiberi (ITA)	24 June 2001 (aged 24)
Attila Valter (HUN)	12 June 1998 (aged 27)
Max van der Meulen (NED)	13 January 2004 (aged 21)
Vlad Van Mechelen (BEL)	2 June 2004 (aged 21)
Edoardo Zambanini (ITA)	21 April 2001 (aged 24)

=== Team Jayco–AlUla ===
As of 27 December 2025

Rider	Date of birth
Pascal Ackermann (GER)	17 January 1994 (aged 31)
Koen Bouwman (NED)	2 December 1993 (aged 32)
Amaury Capiot (BEL)	25 June 1993 (aged 32)
Filippo Conca (ITA)	22 September 1998 (aged 27)
Alessandro Covi (ITA)	28 September 1998 (aged 27)
Dries De Bondt (BEL)	4 July 1991 (aged 34)
Dries De Pooter (BEL)	8 November 2002 (aged 23)
Davide De Pretto (ITA)	19 April 2002 (aged 23)
Robert Donaldson (GBR)	8 April 2002 (aged 23)
Paul Double (GBR)	25 June 1996 (aged 29)
Luke Durbridge (AUS)	9 April 1991 (aged 34)
Felix Engelhardt (GER)	19 August 2000 (aged 25)
Anders Foldager (DEN)	27 July 2001 (aged 24)
Patrick Gamper (AUT)	18 February 1997 (aged 28)
Alan Hatherly (RSA)	15 March 1996 (aged 29)

Rider	Date of birth
Asbjørn Hellemose (DEN)	15 January 1999 (aged 26)
Christopher Juul-Jensen (DEN)	6 July 1989 (aged 36)
Jelte Krijnsen (NED)	12 May 2001 (aged 24)
Michael Matthews (AUS)	26 September 1990 (aged 35)
Hamish McKenzie (AUS)	13 September 2004 (aged 21)
Luka Mezgec (SLO)	27 June 1988 (aged 37)
Kelland O'Brien (AUS)	22 May 1998 (aged 27)
Ben O'Connor (AUS)	25 November 1995 (aged 30)
Finlay Pickering (GBR)	27 January 2003 (aged 22)
Luke Plapp (AUS)	25 December 2000 (aged 25)
Rudy Porter (AUS)	15 December 2000 (aged 25)
Mauro Schmid (SUI)	4 December 1999 (aged 26)
Jasha Sütterlin (GER)	4 November 1992 (aged 33)
Andrea Vendrame (ITA)	20 July 1994 (aged 31)

=== Team Picnic–PostNL ===
As of 27 December 2025

Rider	Date of birth
Warren Barguil (FRA)	28 October 1991 (aged 34)
Frits Biesterbos (NED)	14 February 2002 (aged 23)
Pavel Bittner (CZE)	29 October 2002 (aged 23)
Dillon Corkery (IRL)	12 February 1999 (aged 26)
Timo de Jong (NED)	28 March 1999 (aged 26)
John Degenkolb (GER)	7 January 1989 (aged 36)
Robbe Dhondt (BEL)	25 June 2004 (aged 21)
Matthew Dinham (AUS)	9 April 2000 (aged 25)
Nils Eekhoff (NED)	23 January 1998 (aged 27)
Alexy Faure Prost (FRA)	22 April 2004 (aged 21)
Sean Flynn (GBR)	2 March 2000 (aged 25)
Mattia Gaffuri (ITA)	4 July 1999 (aged 26)
Chris Hamilton (AUS)	18 May 1995 (aged 30)
Fabio Jakobsen (NED)	31 August 1996 (aged 29)

Rider	Date of birth
James Knox (GBR)	4 November 1995 (aged 30)
Bjoern Koerdt (GBR)	20 July 2004 (aged 21)
Gijs Leemreize (NED)	23 October 1999 (aged 26)
Niklas Märkl (GER)	3 March 1999 (aged 26)
Juan Guillermo Martínez (COL)	21 November 2004 (aged 21)
Tim Naberman (NED)	11 May 1999 (aged 26)
Oliver Peace (GBR)	2 April 2005 (aged 20)
Max Poole (GBR)	1 March 2003 (aged 22)
Henri-François Renard-Haquin (FRA)	12 December 2002 (aged 23)
Timo Roosen (NED)	11 January 1993 (aged 32)
Julius van den Berg (NED)	23 October 1996 (aged 29)
Frank van den Broek (NED)	28 December 2000 (aged 25)
Casper van Uden (NED)	22 July 2001 (aged 24)
Bram Welten (NED)	29 March 1997 (aged 28)

=== Visma–Lease a Bike ===
As of 1 January 2026

Rider	Date of birth
Edoardo Affini (ITA)	24 June 1996 (aged 29)
Bruno Armirail (FRA)	11 April 1994 (aged 31)
Louis Barré (FRA)	6 April 2000 (aged 25)
Niklas Behrens (GER)	6 November 2003 (aged 22)
Matthew Brennan (GBR)	6 August 2005 (aged 20)
Victor Campenaerts (BEL)	28 October 1991 (aged 34)
Owain Doull (GBR)	2 May 1993 (aged 32)
Filippo Fiorelli (ITA)	19 November 1994 (aged 31)
Tijmen Graat (NED)	10 January 2003 (aged 22)
Per Strand Hagenes (NOR)	10 July 2003 (aged 22)
Menno Huising (NED)	8 April 2004 (aged 21)
Matteo Jorgenson (USA)	1 July 1999 (aged 26)
Wilco Kelderman (NED)	25 March 1991 (aged 34)
Timo Kielich (BEL)	5 August 1999 (aged 26)
Steven Kruijswijk (NED)	7 June 1987 (aged 38)

Rider	Date of birth
Sepp Kuss (USA)	13 September 1994 (aged 31)
Christophe Laporte (FRA)	11 December 1992 (aged 33)
Bart Lemmen (NED)	14 October 1995 (aged 30)
Pietro Mattio (ITA)	27 June 2004 (aged 21)
Jørgen Nordhagen (NOR)	10 January 2005 (aged 20)
Davide Piganzoli (ITA)	8 July 2002 (aged 23)
Tim Rex (BEL)	11 April 2004 (aged 21)
Anton Schiffer (GER)	1 September 1999 (aged 26)
Ben Tulett (GBR)	26 August 2001 (aged 24)
Wout van Aert (BEL)	15 September 1994 (aged 31)
Loe van Belle (NED)	24 January 2002 (aged 23)
Jonas Vingegaard (DEN)	10 December 1996 (aged 29)
Axel Zingle (FRA)	18 December 1998 (aged 27)

=== UAE Team Emirates XRG ===
As of 27 December 2025

Rider	Date of birth
João Almeida (POR)	5 August 1998 (aged 27)
Igor Arrieta (ESP)	8 December 2002 (aged 23)
Filippo Baroncini (ITA)	26 August 2000 (aged 25)
Mikkel Bjerg (DEN)	3 November 1998 (aged 27)
Jan Christen (SUI)	26 June 2004 (aged 21)
Benoît Cosnefroy (FRA)	17 October 1995 (aged 30)
Isaac del Toro (MEX)	27 November 2003 (aged 22)
Felix Großschartner (AUT)	23 December 1993 (aged 32)
Rune Herregodts (BEL)	27 July 1998 (aged 27)
Julius Johansen (DEN)	13 September 1999 (aged 26)
Vegard Stake Laengen (NOR)	7 February 1989 (aged 36)
Brandon McNulty (USA)	2 April 1998 (aged 27)
Juan Sebastián Molano (COL)	4 November 1994 (aged 31)
António Morgado (POR)	28 January 2004 (aged 21)
Jhonatan Narváez (ECU)	4 March 1997 (aged 28)

Rider	Date of birth
Domen Novak (SLO)	12 July 1995 (aged 30)
Ivo Oliveira (POR)	5 September 1996 (aged 29)
Rui Oliveira (POR)	5 September 1996 (aged 29)
Adrià Pericas (ESP)	26 May 2006 (aged 19)
Tadej Pogačar (SLO)	21 September 1998 (aged 27)
Nils Politt (GER)	6 March 1994 (aged 31)
Pavel Sivakov (FRA)	11 July 1997 (aged 28)
Marc Soler (ESP)	22 November 1993 (aged 32)
Pablo Torres (ESP)	10 November 2005 (aged 20)
Kevin Vermaerke (USA)	16 October 2000 (aged 25)
Florian Vermeersch (BEL)	12 March 1999 (aged 26)
Jay Vine (AUS)	16 November 1995 (aged 30)
Tim Wellens (BEL)	10 May 1991 (aged 34)
Adam Yates (GBR)	7 August 1992 (aged 33)

=== Uno-X Mobility ===
As of 27 December 2025

Rider	Date of birth
Jonas Abrahamsen (NOR)	20 September 1995 (aged 30)
Carl-Frederik Bévort (DEN)	24 November 2003 (aged 22)
Erlend Blikra (NOR)	11 January 1997 (aged 28)
William Blume Levy (DEN)	14 January 2001 (aged 24)
Sven Erik Bystrøm (NOR)	21 January 1992 (aged 33)
Anthon Charmig (DEN)	25 March 1998 (aged 27)
Magnus Cort (DEN)	16 January 1993 (aged 32)
Simon Dalby (DEN)	29 January 2003 (aged 22)
Fredrik Dversnes (NOR)	20 March 1997 (aged 28)
Stian Fredheim (NOR)	23 March 2003 (aged 22)
Markus Hoelgaard (NOR)	4 October 1994 (aged 31)
Ådne Holter (NOR)	8 July 2000 (aged 25)
Jonas Iversby Hvideberg (NOR)	9 February 1999 (aged 26)
Storm Ingebrigtsen (NOR)	17 February 2005 (aged 20)
Anders Halland Johannessen (NOR)	23 August 1999 (aged 26)

Rider	Date of birth
Tobias Halland Johannessen (NOR)	23 August 1999 (aged 26)
Alexander Kamp (DEN)	14 December 1993 (aged 32)
Andreas Kron (DEN)	1 June 1998 (aged 27)
Johannes Kulset (NOR)	14 April 2004 (aged 21)
Andreas Leknessund (NOR)	21 May 1999 (aged 26)
Sakarias Koller Løland (NOR)	20 September 2001 (aged 24)
Henrik Pedersen (DEN)	3 December 2004 (aged 21)
Erik Nordsæter Resell (NOR)	28 September 1996 (aged 29)
Anders Skaarseth (NOR)	7 May 1995 (aged 30)
Tobias Svarre (DEN)	19 July 2004 (aged 21)
Rasmus Tiller (NOR)	28 July 1996 (aged 29)
Martin Tjøtta (NOR)	27 March 2001 (aged 24)
Torstein Træen (NOR)	16 July 1995 (aged 30)
Martin Urianstad (NOR)	6 February 1999 (aged 26)
Søren Wærenskjold (NOR)	12 March 2000 (aged 25)

=== XDS Astana Team ===
As of 27 December 2025

Rider	Date of birth
Davide Ballerini (ITA)	21 September 1994 (aged 31)
Alberto Bettiol (ITA)	29 October 1993 (aged 32)
Clément Champoussin (FRA)	29 May 1998 (aged 27)
Nicola Conci (ITA)	5 January 1997 (aged 28)
Yevgeniy Fedorov (KAZ)	16 February 2000 (aged 25)
Lorenzo Fortunato (ITA)	9 May 1996 (aged 29)
Aaron Gate (NZL)	26 November 1990 (aged 35)
Lev Gonov (RUS)	6 February 2000 (aged 25)
Sergio Higuita (COL)	1 August 1997 (aged 28)
Florian Samuel Kajamini (ITA)	28 February 2003 (aged 22)
Max Kanter (GER)	22 October 1997 (aged 28)
Anton Kuzmin (KAZ)	20 November 1996 (aged 29)
Arjen Livyns (BEL)	1 September 1994 (aged 31)
Harold Martín López (ECU)	3 December 2000 (aged 25)
Matteo Malucelli (ITA)	20 October 1993 (aged 32)

Rider	Date of birth
Henok Mulubrhan (ERI)	11 November 1999 (aged 26)
Cristián Rodríguez (ESP)	3 March 1995 (aged 30)
Alessandro Romele (ITA)	30 August 2003 (aged 22)
Christian Scaroni (ITA)	16 October 1997 (aged 28)
Marco Schrettl (AUT)	11 September 2003 (aged 22)
Guillermo Thomas Silva (URU)	30 December 2001 (aged 24)
Su Haoyu (CHN)	26 October 2000 (aged 25)
Gleb Syritsa (RUS)	14 April 2000 (aged 25)
Harold Tejada (COL)	27 April 1997 (aged 28)
Mike Teunissen (NED)	25 August 1992 (aged 33)
Davide Toneatti (ITA)	9 April 2001 (aged 24)
Diego Ulissi (ITA)	15 July 1989 (aged 36)
Darren van Bekkum (NED)	20 March 2002 (aged 23)
Simone Velasco (ITA)	2 December 1995 (aged 30)
Nicolas Vinokurov (KAZ)	7 July 2002 (aged 23)

== See also ==
- 2026 in men's road cycling
- List of 2026 UCI ProTeams and Continental teams
- List of 2026 UCI Women's Teams and riders

Preceded by 2025	List of UCI WorldTeams; 2026	Succeeded by 2027
