= 2022 UCI Road World Championships – Men's junior time trial =

Cycling event

Men's junior time trial
2022 UCI Road World Championships

Race details
- Dates: 20 September 2022
- Distance: 28.8 km (17.90 mi)
- Winning time: 34:59.26

Medalists
	Gold	Joshua Tarling (GBR)
	Silver	Hamish McKenzie (AUS)
	Bronze	Emil Herzog (GER)

The men's junior time trial of the 2022 UCI Road World Championships was a cycling event that took place on 20 September 2022 in Wollongong, Australia.

== Final classification ==
Rank	Rider	Time	Behind
1st place, gold medalist(s)	(United Kingdom) Joshua Tarling (GBR)	34:59.26	
2nd place, silver medalist(s)	(Australia) Hamish McKenzie (AUS)	35:18.45	+19.19
3rd place, bronze medalist(s)	(Germany) Emil Herzog (GER)	35:32.71	+33.45
4	(Switzerland) Jan Christen (SUI)	35:58.78	+59.52
5	(Estonia) Romet Pajur (EST)	36:06.30	+1:07.04
6	(United States) Artem Shmidt (USA)	36:36.36	+1:37.10
7	(Estonia) Frank Aron Ragilo (EST)	36:37.72	+1:38.46
8	(Belgium) Duarte Marivoet (BEL)	36:39.89	+1:40.63
9	(Norway) Jørgen Nordhagen (NOR)	36:40.83	+1:41.57
10	(France) Thibaud Gruel (FRA)	36:40.90	+1:41.64
11	(Luxembourg) Mathieu Kockelmann (LUX)	36:43.41	+1:44.15
12	(Germany) Louis Leidert (GER)	36:53.12	+1:53.86
13	(Italy) Nicolas Milesi (ITA)	36:56.86	+1:57.60
14	(Australia) Cameron Rogers (AUS)	36:57.57	+1:58.31
15	(Czech Republic) Pavel Novák (CZE)	37:01.29	+2:02.03
16	(Sweden) Sjors Lugthart (SWE)	37:06.84	+2:07.58
17	(Austria) Benjamin Eckerstorfer (AUT)	37:08.00	+2:08.74
18	(Australia) William Eaves (AUS)	37:10.67	+2:11.41
19	(Portugal) Gonçalo Tavares (POR)	37:22.09	+2:22.83
20	(Portugal) António Morgado (POR)	37:24.56	+2:25.30
21	(Slovenia) Natan Gregorčič (SLO)	37:25.35	+2:26.09
22	(Colombia) William Colorado Osorio (COL)	37:27.01	+2:27.75
23	(Netherlands) Mees Vlot (NED)	37:39.62	+2:40.36
24	(United States) Alexander Gustin (USA)	37:50.46	+2:51.20
25	(Italy) Renato Favero (ITA)	37:53.03	+2:53.77
26	(Belgium) Jens Verbrugghe (BEL)	37:57.50	+2:58.24
27	(Czech Republic) Štěpán Telecký (CZE)	37:58.77	+2:59.51
28	(Canada) Felix Hamel (CAN)	37:59.28	+3:00.02
29	(Poland) Hubert Grygowski (POL)	38:00.84	+3:01.58
30	(Canada) Campbell Parrish (CAN)	38:04.83	+3:05.57
31	(Poland) Dominik Ratajczak (POL)	38:07.22	+3:07.96
32	(Lithuania) Rokas Adomaitis (LTU)	38:10.48	+3:11.22
33	(Switzerland) Tim Rey (SUI)	38:12.93	+3:13.66
34	(Finland) Anton Skutnabb (FIN)	38:22.75	+3:23.49
35	(New Zealand) Tom Stephenson (NZL)	38:32.99	+3:33.73
36	(Serbia) Mihajlo Stolić (SRB)	38:40.31	+3:41.05
37	(Lithuania) Aironas Gerdauskas (LTU)	38:43.01	+3:43.75
38	(Kazakhstan) Maxim Taraskin (KAZ)	39:10.53	+4:11.27
39	(Japan) Kazuma Fujimura (JPN)	39:10.86	+4:11.60
40	(Panama) Felipe Chan (PAN)	39:24.99	+4:25.73
41	(Eritrea) Aklilu Arefayne (ERI)	39:29.23	+4:29.97
42	(Kazakhstan) Maxim Taraskin (KAZ)	39:30.13	+4:30.87
43	(Japan) Kazuma Fujimura (JPN)	39:33.30	+4:34.04
44	(Panama) Felipe Chan (PAN)	39:42.67	+4:43.41
45	(Eritrea) Aklilu Arefayne (ERI)	40:02.13	+5:02.87
46	(Spain) Pau Marti Soriano (ESP)	40:03.22	+5:03.96
47	(New Zealand) Lewis Bower (NZL)	40:07.26	+5:08.00
48	(Indonesia) Muhammad Syelhan (INA)	40:11.18	+5:11.92
49	(Japan) Koki Kamada (JPN)	40:17.72	+5:18.46
50	(Azerbaijan) Kamran Mirzakhanov (AZE)	40:27.46	+5:28.20
51	(South Africa) Jose Kleinsmit (RSA)	40:47.73	+5:48.47
52	(South Africa) Francois Hofmeyr (RSA)	43:18.73	+8:19.47
