= 2022 UCI Road World Championships – Men's junior road race =

Cycling event

Men's junior road race
2022 UCI Road World Championships
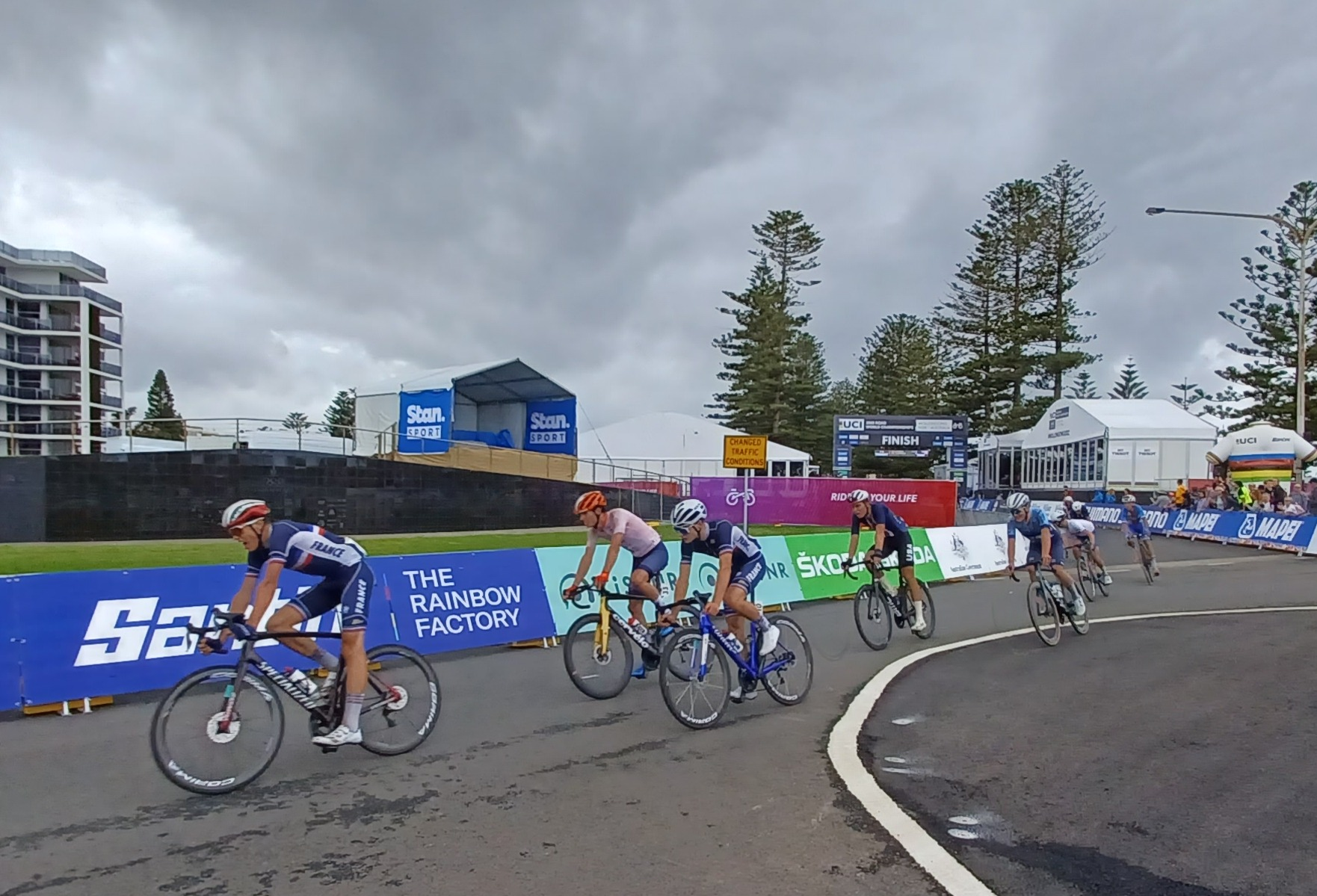
- Riders just after passing the finish line

Race details
- Dates: 23 September 2022
- Distance: 135.6 km (84.26 mi)
- Winning time: 3:11:07

Medalists
	Gold	Emil Herzog (GER)
	Silver	António Morgado (POR)
	Bronze	Vlad Van Mechelen (BEL)

The men's junior road race of the 2022 UCI Road World Championships was a cycling event that took place on 23 September 2022 in Wollongong, Australia.

== Final classification ==
Of the race's 108 entrants, 60 riders completed the full distance of 135.6 kilometres (84.3 mi).

Rank	Rider	Country	Time	Behind
1st place, gold medalist(s)	Emil Herzog	Germany	3:11:07	+0
2nd place, silver medalist(s)	António Morgado	Portugal	3:11:07	+0
3rd place, bronze medalist(s)	Vlad Van Mechelen	Belgium	3:12:02	+0:55
4	Paul Magnier	France	3:12:02	+0:55
5	Artem Shmidt	United States	3:12:02	+0:55
6	Menno Huising	Netherlands	3:12:02	+0:55
7	Thibaud Gruel	France	3:12:02	+0:55
8	Frank Aron Ragilo	Estonia	3:12:02	+0:55
9	Zachary Walker	Great Britain	3:12:02	+0:55
10	Pavel Novák	Czech Republic	3:12:02	+0:55
11	Viggo Moore	United States	3:12:02	+0:55
12	Jan Christen	Switzerland	3:12:02	+0:55
13	Jørgen Nordhagen	Norway	3:12:06	+0:59
14	Matteo Scalco	Italy	3:13:29	+2:22
15	Romet Pajur	Estonia	3:13:55	+2:48
16	Milan Kadlec	Czech Republic	3:13:55	+2:48
17	Benjamin Eckerstorfer	Austria	3:13:55	+2:48
18	Gonçalo Tavares	Portugal	3:13:55	+2:48
19	Oscar Chamberlain	Australia	3:16:37	+5:30
20	Jed Smithson	Great Britain	3:17:34	+6:27
21	Mathieu Kockelmann	Luxembourg	3:18:23	+7:16
22	Cameron Rogers	Australia	3:18:23	+7:16
23	Natan Gregorčič	Slovenia	3:18:23	+7:16
24	Noa Isidore	France	3:18:23	+7:16
25	Martin Bárta	Czech Republic	3:18:23	+7:16
26	Léandre Lozouet	France	3:18:23	+7:16
27	Matys Grise	France	3:18:30	+7:23
28	Yoel Ghebregergish	Eritrea	3:21:12	+10:05
29	Louis Leidert	Germany	3:22:25	+11:18
30	Jérôme Gauthier	Canada	3:22:57	+11:50
31	Nicolas Gojković	Croatia	3:22:57	+11:50
32	Fabian Wünstel	Switzerland	3:22:57	+11:50
33	Hubert Grygowski	Croatia	3:22:57	+11:50
34	Mil Morang	Luxembourg	3:22:57	+11:50
35	Simone Gualdi	Italy	3:22:57	+11:50
36	Pau Marti Soriano	Spain	3:22:57	+11:50
37	Hamish McKenzie	Australia	3:22:57	+11:50
38	Daniel Lima	Portugal	3:22:57	+11:50
39	Aljaž Turk	Slovenia	3:22:57	+11:50
40	Samuel Novák	Slovakia	3:22:57	+11:50
41	Sente Sentjens	Belgium	3:22:57	+11:50
42	Mikal Grimstad Uglehus	Norway	3:22:57	+11:50
43	Joël Tinner	Switzerland	3:22:57	+11:50
44	Anton Skutnabb	Finland	3:22:57	+11:50
45	Max van der Meulen	Netherlands	3:22:57	+11:50
46	Yago Aguirre Subijana	Spain	3:22:57	+11:50
47	William Eaves	Australia	3:22:57	+11:50
48	Maxence Place	Belgium	3:22:57	+11:50
49	Toby Evans	New Zealand	3:22:57	+11:50
50	Mauro Brenner	Germany	3:22:57	+11:50
51	Michael Leonard	Canada	3:22:57	+11:50
52	Mihnea-Alexandru Harasim	Romania	3:22:57	+11:50
53	Felix Hamel	Canada	3:22:57	+11:50
54	Viego Tijssen	Netherlands	3:22:57	+11:50
55	Diego Pescador	Colombia	3:22:57	+11:50
56	Alexander Gustin	United States	3:23:02	+11:55
57	Kazuma Fujimura	Japan	3:23:02	+11:55
58	Tiago Nunes	Portugal	3:24:38	+13:31
59	Jose Kleinsmit	South Africa	3:24:43	+13:36
60	Yonas Abraham	Eritrea	3:24:46	+13:39

Rank	Rider	Country	Time	Behind
	Campbell Parrish	Canada	Did not finish	
	Aklilu Arefayne	Eritrea	Did not finish	
	Kamran Mirzakhanov	Azerbaijan	Did not finish	
	Matvey Ushakov	Ukraine	Did not finish	
	Mihajlo Stolić	Serbia	Did not finish	
	Kasper Haugland	Norway	Did not finish	
	Matteo Groß	Germany	Did not finish	
	Johannes Kulset	Norway	Did not finish	
	Tomáš Sivok	Slovakia	Did not finish	
	Maxim Taraskin	Kazakhstan	Did not finish	
	Michał Żelazowski	Poland	Did not finish	
	Natawat Mongkonwong	Thailand	Did not finish	
	Dario Igor Belletta	Italy	Did not finish	
	Joshua Tarling	Great Britain	Did not finish	
	Tomas-Casimir Niemi	Finland	Did not finish	
	Žak Eržen	Slovenia	Did not finish	
	Mohammed Najib Sanbouli	Morocco	Did not finish	
	Syarif Hidayatullah	Indonesia	Did not finish	
	Koki Kamada	Japan	Did not finish	
	Kamonthacha Inthong	Thailand	Did not finish	
	Lauri Tamm	Estonia	Did not finish	
	Mees Vlot	Netherlands	Did not finish	
	Aaron Aus	Estonia	Did not finish	
	Semen Simon	Ukraine	Did not finish	
	Štěpán Telecký	Czech Republic	Did not finish	
	Alexey Vaganov	Kazakhstan	Did not finish	
	Pablo Lospitao	Spain	Did not finish	
	Giovanni Zordan	Italy	Did not finish	
	William Colorado	Colombia	Did not finish	
	Francois Hofmeyr	South Africa	Did not finish	
	Jesper Stiansen	Norway	Did not finish	
	Jens Verbrugghe	Belgium	Did not finish	
	Felipe Chan	Panama	Did not finish	
	Martin Jurík	Slovakia	Did not finish	
	Tim Rey	Switzerland	Did not finish	
	Jose Bicho	Portugal	Did not finish	
	Sjors Lugthart	Netherlands	Did not finish	
	Rokas Adomaitis	Lithuania	Did not finish	
	Aironas Gerdauskas	Lithuania	Did not finish	
	Ilya Karabutov	Kazakhstan	Did not finish	
	Muhammad Syelhan	Indonesia	Did not finish	
	Achraf El Kurymy	Morocco	Did not finish	
	Dominik Ratajczak	Poland	Did not finish	
	Ilian Alexandre Barhoumi	Switzerland	Did not finish	
	Federico Savino	Italy	Did not finish	
	Duarte Marivoet	Belgium	Did not finish	
	Lewis Bower	New Zealand	Did not start	
	Tom Stephenson	New Zealand	Did not start	
