= 2023 UCI Road World Championships – Men's junior road race =

Cycling event

Men's junior road race
2023 UCI Road World Championships

Race details
- Dates: 23 September 2023
- Distance: 127.2 km (79.0 mi)
- Winning time: 3:06:26

Medalists
	Gold	Albert Philipsen (DEN)
	Silver	Paul Fietzke (GER)
	Bronze	Felix Ørn-Kristoff (NOR)

The men's junior road race of the 2023 UCI Road World Championships was a cycling event that took place on 5 August 2023 in Glasgow, Scotland.

== Final classification ==
Of the race's 154 entrants, 152 started the race and 70 riders completed the full distance of 127.2 kilometres (79.0 mi).

Rank	Name	Nation	Time	Gap
1	Albert Philipsen	Denmark	3:06:26	+0
2	Paul Fietzke	Germany	3:07:45	+1:19
3	Felix Ørn-Kristoff	Norway	s.t.	s.t.
4	Juan David Sierra	Italy	3:07:50	+1:24
5	Theodor Storm	Denmark	3:07:55	+1:29
6	Jørgen Nordhagen	Norway	3:08:09	+1:43
7	Steffen De Schuyteneer	Belgium	3:09:23	+2:57
8	Sebastian Grindley	United Kingdom	3:09:25	+2:59
9	Žak Eržen	Slovenia	3:09:27	+3:01
10	Oscar Chamberlain	Australia	s.t.	s.t.
11	Senna Remijn	Netherlands	s.t.	s.t.
12	Kryštof Kral	Czech Republic	s.t.	s.t.
13	Storm Ingebrigtsen	Norway	s.t.	s.t.
14	Sente Sentjens	Belgium	s.t.	s.t.
15	Kasper Haugland	Norway	s.t.	s.t.
16	Theodor Clemmensen	Denmark	s.t.	s.t.
17	Wil Holmes	Australia	s.t.	s.t.
18	Viego Tijssen	Netherlands	s.t.	s.t.
19	Mikal Grimstad Uglehus	Norway	s.t.	s.t.
20	Matys Grisel	France	s.t.	s.t.
21	Andrea Bessega	Italy	s.t.	s.t.
22	Jakob Omrzel	Slovenia	s.t.	s.t.
23	Tomos Pattinson	United Kingdom	s.t.	s.t.
24	Patryk Goszczurny	Poland	s.t.	s.t.
25	Paul Seixas	France	s.t.	s.t.
26	Adrià Pericas	Spain	s.t.	s.t.
27	Louis Leidert	Germany	s.t.	s.t.
28	Joshua Cranage	Australia	s.t.	s.t.
29	Kasper Borremans	Finland	s.t.	s.t.
30	Héctor Álvarez	Spain	s.t.	s.t.
31	Henry Neff	United States	3:09:32	+3:06
32	Erazem Valjavec	Slovenia	3:09:44	+3:18
33	Matthew Brennan	United Kingdom	3:10:10	+3:44
34	Karst Hayma	Netherlands	3:12:46	+6:20
35	Matthias Schwarzbacher	Slovakia	3:13:00	+6:34
36	Victor Vaneeckhoutte	Belgium	3:16:47	+10:21
37	Maxime Decomble	France	s.t.	s.t.
38	Ian Kings	Germany	s.t.	s.t.
39	Luke Fetzer	United States	3:18:24	+11:58
40	Heede Lars Vanden	Belgium	s.t.	s.t.
41	Sjors Lugthart	Netherlands	3:18:33	+12:07
42	Daniil Yakovlev	Ukraine	s.t.	s.t.
43	Ville Merlov	Sweden	3:18:37	+12:11
44	Kristupas Mikutis	Lithuania	3:18:40	+12:14
45	Zsombor Takacs	Hungary	3:18:47	+12:21
46	Victor Benareau	Switzerland	3:18:55	+12:29
47	Thom van der Werff	Netherlands	s.t.	s.t.
48	Ikki Watanabe	Japan	s.t.	s.t.
49	Charles Bergeron	Canada	s.t.	s.t.
50	Martti Lenzius	Estonia	s.t.	s.t.
51	Bernardo Gaston Cambareri	Argentina	s.t.	s.t.
52	Alvarez Ciro Perez	Uruguay	s.t.	s.t.
53	Balint Feldhoffer	Hungary	s.t.	s.t.
54	Filip Gruszczynski	Poland	s.t.	s.t.
55	Finn Wilson	New Zealand	s.t.	s.t.
56	Martin Barta	Czech Republic	s.t.	s.t.
57	Marcel Skok	Slovenia	s.t.	s.t.
58	Andrey Andre	Brazil	s.t.	s.t.
59	Andrei Carbunarea	Romania	s.t.	s.t.
60	Álvaro García	Spain	s.t.	s.t.
61	Ryno Schutte	South Africa	s.t.	s.t.
62	Nicolas Ginter	Switzerland	s.t.	s.t.
63	Florian Hochuli	Switzerland	s.t.	s.t.
64	Matthew Ney	Canada	s.t.	s.t.
65	Manolo Wrolich	Austria	3:19:07	+12:41
66	Andreas Jensen	Denmark	3:19:08	+12:42
67	Gusts Lapins	Latvia	3:19:14	+12:48
68	Manyu Julian Abi	Indonesia	3:19:17	+12:51
69	Seth Dunwoody	Ireland	3:20:51	+14:25
70	De Almeida Luiz Fernando Bomfim	Brazil	3:25:22	+18:56

Rank	Rider	Country	Time	Behind
	Ethan Powell	Canada	DNF	
	Karl Kurits	Estonia	DNF	
	Szymon Wisniewski	Poland	DNF	
	Cian Hampton	Austria	DNF	
	Oliver Korva	Luxembourg	DNF	
	Karim Mliki	Tunisia	DNF	
	Danylo Chernomortsev	Ukraine	DNF	
	Cano Mateo Duque	Argentina	DNF	
	Muniz Cesar Leonel Cisneros	Mexico	DNF	
	Pavel Šumpik	Czech Republic	DNF	
	Lawrence Lorot	Uganda	DNF	
	Tiago Santos	Portugal	DNF	
	Olivers Jekabs Skrapcis	Latvia	DNF	
	Radostin Zlatev	Bulgaria	DNF	
	Catalin-Luca Campean	Romania	DNF	
	Jose Moreira	Portugal	DNF	
	Quijano Robinson Rincon	Colombia	DNF	
	Filippo Cettolin	Italy	DNF	
	Caro Juan Urian	Colombia	DNF	
	Darren Parham	United States	DNF	
	Paredes Kevin Navas	Ecuador	DNF	
	Gustav Magnusson	Sweden	DNF	
	Gabriel Alonso Valerio Rodrigo	Dominican Republic	DNF	
	Eli Tregidga	New Zealand	DNF	
	Matvey Ushakov	Ukraine	DNF	
	Patrick Frydkjaer	Denmark	DNF	
	David John Thompson	United States	DNF	
	Simone Gualdi	Italy	DNF	
	Luca Giaimi	Italy	DNF	
	Cohen Jessen	Australia	DNF	
	Aubin Sparfel	France	DNF	
	Bruno Kessler	Germany	DNF	
	Bachir Chennafi	Algeria	DNF	
	Jan Bittner	Czech Republic	DNF	
	Fynn Ury	Luxembourg	DNF	
	Michal Strzelecki	Poland	DNF	
	Kurymy Achraf El	Morocco	DNF	
	Jehad Alhassan	Saudi Arabia	DNF	
	Felipe Chan	Panama	DNF	
	Karl-Nicolas Gronlund	Finland	DNF	
	Muhammad Syelhan Nurahmat	Indonesia	DNF	
	Carter Guichard	New Zealand	DNF	
	Kazuma Fujimura	Japan	DNF	
	Mats Berns	Luxembourg	DNF	
	Ben Wiggins	United Kingdom	DNF	
	Arthur Blaise	France	DNF	
	Jose Kleinsmit	South Africa	DNF	
	Sanchez Gabriel Ulcuango	Ecuador	DNF	
	Muhammad Aflah	Indonesia	DNF	
	Veselin Georgiev	Bulgaria	DNF	
	Kamya Richard Bukenya	Uganda	DNF	
	Riad Bakhti	Algeria	DNF	
	Angel David Rodriguez	Dominican Republic	DNF	
	Jaka Marolt	Slovenia	DNF	
	Brien Liam O	Ireland	DNF	
	Samuel Novak	Slovakia	DNF	
	Aarbaoui El Mahdi El	Morocco	DNF	
	Chavez Facundo Arias	Chile	DNF	
	Jonas Reibsch	Germany	DNF	
	Konstantinos Berdempes	Greece	DNF	
	Mounir Laloui	Algeria	DNF	
	Yahya Bourkila	Morocco	DNF	
	Tinnapat Muangdet	Thailand	DNF	
	Castillo Jose Maria Alcocer	Mexico	DNF	
	De Oca Monzon Carlos Montes	Cuba	DNF	
	Mohammed Majrashi	Saudi Arabia	DNF	
	Jarno Widar	Belgium	DNF	
	Janvier Shyaka	Rwanda	DNF	
	Arruti Felipe Emanuel Reyes	Uruguay	DNF	
	Serdar Gedik	Turkey	DNF	
	Djaoued Chams Eddine Nhari	Algeria	DNF	
	Nuntakorn Nontakeaw	Thailand	DNF	
	Jed Smithson	United Kingdom	DNF	
	Markel Beloki	Spain	DNF	
	Markus Maeuibo	Estonia	DNF	
	Degaga Jeno	Ethiopia	DNF	
	Anes Riahi	Algeria	DNF	
	Lovemore Ntini	Zimbabwe	DNF	
	Qodirov Komron	Tajikistan	DNF	
	George Ascott	Zimbabwe	DNF	
	Drissa Bamba	Mali	DNF	
	Ilian Alexandre Barhoumi	Switzerland	DNF	
	Andrew August	United States	DNS	
	Kevin Nshutiraguma	Rwanda	DNS	
