= 2023 UCI Road World Championships – Men's under-23 time trial =

Cycling race

Men's under-23 time trial
2023 UCI Road World Championships

Race details
- Dates: 9 August 2023
- Stages: 1 in Stirling, Great Britain
- Distance: 36.4 km (22.6 mi)
- Winning time: 43' 00.46"

Medalists
	Gold	(Italy) Lorenzo Milesi (ITA)
	Silver	(Belgium) Alec Segaert (BEL)
	Bronze	(Australia) Hamish McKenzie (AUS)

The men's under-23 time trial of the 2023 UCI Road World Championships was a cycling event that took place on 9 August 2023 in Stirling, Great Britain.

== Final classification ==
Rank	Rider	Country	Time
1	Lorenzo Milesi	Italy	49' 27.26"
2	Alec Segaert	Belgium	+11.27"
3	Hamish McKenzie	Australia	+ 50.79"
4	Raúl García Pierna	Spain	+ 53.59"
5	Darren Rafferty	Ireland	+ 56.01"
6	Josh Charlton	Great Britain	+ 1' 11.57"
7	Jakob Söderqvist	Sweden	+ 1' 18.12"
8	Logan Currie	New Zealand	+ 1' 18.69"
9	Jan Christen	Switzerland	+ 1' 21.49"
10	Michael Leonard	Canada	+ 1' 29.25"
11	Jonathan Vervenne	Belgium	+ 1' 42.05"
12	Alastair Mackellar	Australia	+ 1' 42.42"
13	Carl-Frederik Bevort	Denmark	+ 1' 42.74"
14	Callum Thornley	Great Britain	+ 1' 45.76"
15	Ivan Romeo Abad	Spain	+ 1' 51.58"
16	Eddy Le Huitouze	France	+ 1' 57.09"
17	Aivaras Mikutis	Lithuania	+ 1' 57.80"
18	Loe van Belle	Netherlands	+ 2' 02.75"
19	Dean Harvey	Ireland	+ 2' 07.67"
20	Gustav Wang	Denmark	+ 2' 07.77"
21	Roel van Sintmaartensdijk	Netherlands	+ 2' 13.75"
22	Enzo Paleni	France	+ 2' 18.80"
23	Yuhi Todome	Japan	+ 2' 24.24"
24	Fabian Weiss	Switzerland	+ 2' 26.64"
25	Evan Boyle	United States	+ 2' 45.41"
26	Tristan Jussaume	Canada	+ 2' 46.32"
27	António Morgado	Portugal	+ 2' 56.07"
28	Moritz Kretschy	Germany	+ 2' 56.90"
29	Mateusz Gajdulewicz	Poland	+ 3' 08.56"
30	Andrey Remkhe	Kazakhstan	+ 3' 12.26"
31	Viggo Moore	United States	+ 3' 22.46"
32	Adrian Stieger	Austria	+ 3' 24.24"
33	Alekss Krasts	Latvia	+ 3' 27.31"
34	Brady Gilmore	Australia	+ 3' 29.21"
35	Truls Nordhagen	Norway	+ 3' 29.80"
36	Mats Wenzel	Luxembourg	+ 3' 32.57"
37	Hector Quintana	Chile	+ 3' 38.93"
36	Gonçalo Tavares	Portugal	+ 3' 43.41"
36	Kacper Gieryk	Poland	+ 3' 46.30"
40	Ole Theiler	Germany	+ 3' 47.54"
41	Filip Řeha	Czech Republic	+ 3' 53.57"
42	Maxim Taraskin	Kazakhstan	+ 4' 06.51"
43	Kiya Rogora	Ethiopia	+ 4' 09.32"
44	Martin Jurik	Slovakia	+ 4' 13.54"
45	Germán Darío Gómez	Colombia	+ 4' 13.86"
46	Bryan Olivo	Italy	+ 4' 16.19"
47	Natan Gregorčič	Slovenia	+ 4' 33.75"
48	Dillon Geary	South Africa	+ 4' 40.57"
49	Mateo Kalejman	Argentina	+ 4' 49.42"
50	Štěpán Telecký	Czech Republic	+ 4' 53.42"
51	Filip Lohinský	Slovakia	+ 4' 57.96"
52	Dylan Jiménez	Costa Rica	+ 5' 00.06"
53	Anderson Arboleda	Colombia	+ 5' 01.30"
54	José Ramon Muñiz	Mexico	+ 5' 05.88"
55	José Prieto De Luna	Mexico	+ 5' 12.18"
56	Dmitriy Bocharov	Uzbekistan	+ 5' 25.40"
57	Ju Jinyang	China	+ 6' 00.51"
58	Muhammad Royan	Indonesia	+ 6' 15.65"
59	Davíð Jónsson	Iceland	+ 6' 19.79"
60	Paul Lomuria	Uganda	+ 6' 20.06"
61	Byiza Uhiriwe	Rwanda	+ 6' 22.13"
62	Etienne Tuyizere	Rwanda	+ 6' 44.98"
63	Bilal Alsaadi	Qatar	+ 7' 03.45"
64	Dmytro Polupan	Ukraine	+ 7' 06.14"
65	Samet Bulut	Turkey	+ 7' 07.76"
66	Tymofii Predko	Ukraine	+ 8' 03.69"
67	Ali Egin	Turkey	+ 8' 05.43"
68	Muhammad Anwar	Pakistan	+ 8' 35.03"
69	Li Tiancheng	China	+ 8' 35.88"
70	Aurelien de Comarmond	Mauritius	+ 10' 10.38"
71	Jacob Schembri	Malta	+ 10' 10.38"
72	Nayef Al Mesallam	Qatar	+ 10' 10.38"
73	Mahmoud Bakr	Egypt	+ 10' 10.38"
74	Borg Luke	Malta	+ 10' 10.38"
75	Claude Harold Fotsing	Cameroon	+ 10' 10.38"
76	Kohath Baron	Dominica	+ 10' 10.38"
77	Ruben Lopes	Cape Verde	+ 10' 10.38"
78	Leonardo Cosmo	Cape Verde	+ 10' 10.38"
	Axel Kallberg	Finland	DNS
