= Wanty–Nippo–ReUz =

Belgian cycling team

Team information
- UCI code: WNR
- Registered: Belgium
- Founded: 2023
- Discipline: Road
- Status: UCI Continental

Key personnel
- Team managers: Kévin Van Melsen; Christophe Prémont; Dimitri Claeys

Team name history
- 2023 2024 2025–: Circus–ReUz–Technord; Wanty–ReUz–Technord; Wanty–Nippo–ReUz

Wanty–Nippo–ReUz is a Belgian UCI Continental road cycling team founded in 2023 that acts as the development program for UCI WorldTeam Intermarché–Wanty.

== Team roster ==
As of 2 July 2025.

Rider	Date of birth
Elmar Abma (NED)	26 April 2004 (age 22)
Nicolas Aernouts (BEL)	12 February 2006 (age 20)
Gilles Dockx (BEL)	7 March 2005 (age 21)
Halvor Dolven (NOR)	13 April 2004 (age 22)
Kazuma Fujimura (JPN)	30 August 2005 (age 21)
Wout Geerinckx (BEL)	2 November 2003 (age 22)
Mewael Girmay (ERI)	15 April 2005 (age 21)
William Graff (BEL)	6 November 2005 (age 20)
Simone Gualdi (ITA)	16 April 2005 (age 21)
Victor Hannes (BEL)	30 January 2004 (age 22)

Rider	Date of birth
Shunsuke Imamura (JPN)	14 February 1998 (age 28)
Zeno Moonen (BEL)	3 July 2003 (age 23)
Tobias Müller (GER)	31 March 2004 (age 22)
Maxence Place (BEL)	18 January 2004 (age 22)
Masao Shimazaki (JPN)	27 October 2005 (age 20)
Keije Solen (NED)	27 March 2006 (age 20)
Wouter Toussaint (NED)	23 March 2004 (age 22)
Axel Van den Broek (BEL)	3 May 2006 (age 20)
Felix Ørn-Kristoff (NOR)	15 March 2006 (age 20)

== Major wins ==
2023
Dorpenomloop Rucphen, Laurenz Rex
Liège–Bastogne–Liège U23, Francesco Busatto
Stage 5 Tour du Loir et Cher, Jasper Dejaegher
Stage 7 Tour de Bretagne, Roel van Sintmaartensdijk
Stage 3 Tour d'Eure-et-Loir, Jasper Dejaegher
Eritrea National Under-23 Time Trial, Aklilu Arefayne
Italy National Under-23 Road Race, Francesco Busatto
Stage 1 Giro della Valle d'Aosta, Dylan Vandenstorme
France National Under-23 Road Race, Alexy Faure Prost
Stage 2 Flanders Tomorrow Tour, Alessio Delle Vedove
2024
Gent–Wevelgem U23, Huub Artz
Stage 7 Giro Next Gen, Huub Artz
2025
Overall Tour de Bretagne, Felix Ørn-Kristoff

Stage 4, Felix Ørn-Kristoff

Stage 2 Tour de Kumano, Shunsuke Imamura
Eritrea National Under-23 Time Trial, Mewael Girmay
Japan National Time Trial, Shunsuke Imamura

== National and continental champions ==
2023
Eritrean Under-23 Time Trial, Aklilu Arefayne
Italian Under-23 Road Race, Francesco Busatto
French Under-23 Road Race, Alexy Faure Prost
2024
European Under-23 Road race, Huub Artz
2025
Eritrean Under-23 Time Trial, Mewael Girmay
Japanese Time Trial, Shunsuke Imamura
