= Menno Huising =

Dutch cyclist

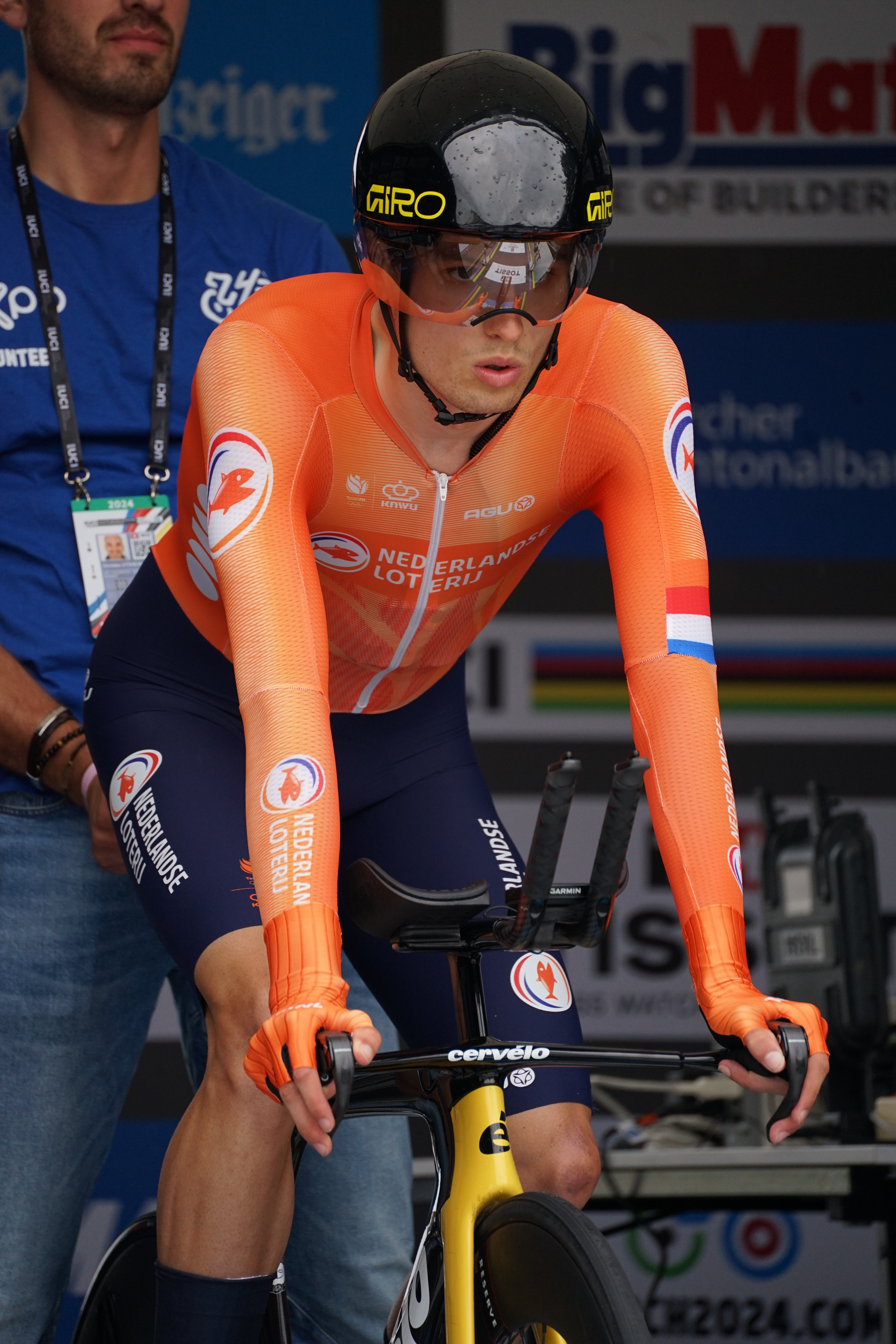
- Huising at the 2024 World Championships

Personal information
- Born: 8 April 2004 (age 22)
- Height: 1.85 m (6 ft 1 in)

Cycling career
- Sport: Cycling
- Current team: Visma–Lease a Bike
- Discipline: Road
- Role: Rider

Amateur team
- 2022: Willebrord Wil Vooruit

Professional teams
- 2023–2024: Jumbo–Visma Development Team
- 2025–: Visma–Lease a Bike

Menno Huising (born 8 April 2004) is a Dutch professional racing cyclist, who rides for UCI WorldTeam Visma–Lease a Bike.

== Major results ==
2021
3rd Road race, National Junior Road Championships
6th Overall Aubel–Thimister–Stavelot
2022
1st Overall Gipuzkoa Klasikoa

1st Stage 1

1st Bernaudeau Junior
1st Stage 3 Course de la Paix Juniors
2nd Overall Tour de DMZ

1st Mountains classification
1st Stages 4 & 5

2nd Overall Watersley Junior Challenge
2nd Ronde van Vlaanderen Juniores
3rd Overall Tour du Pays de Vaud
4th Road race, National Junior Road Championships
4th Chrono des Nations Junior
5th Overall La Philippe Gilbert Junior
6th Road race, UCI Road World Junior Championships
2023
1st Flèche Ardennaise
1st Mountains classification, Istrian Spring Trophy
10th Eurode Omloop
2024
3rd Overall Ronde de l'Isard
8th Flèche Ardennaise
