= Felix Ørn-Kristoff =

Norwegian cyclist

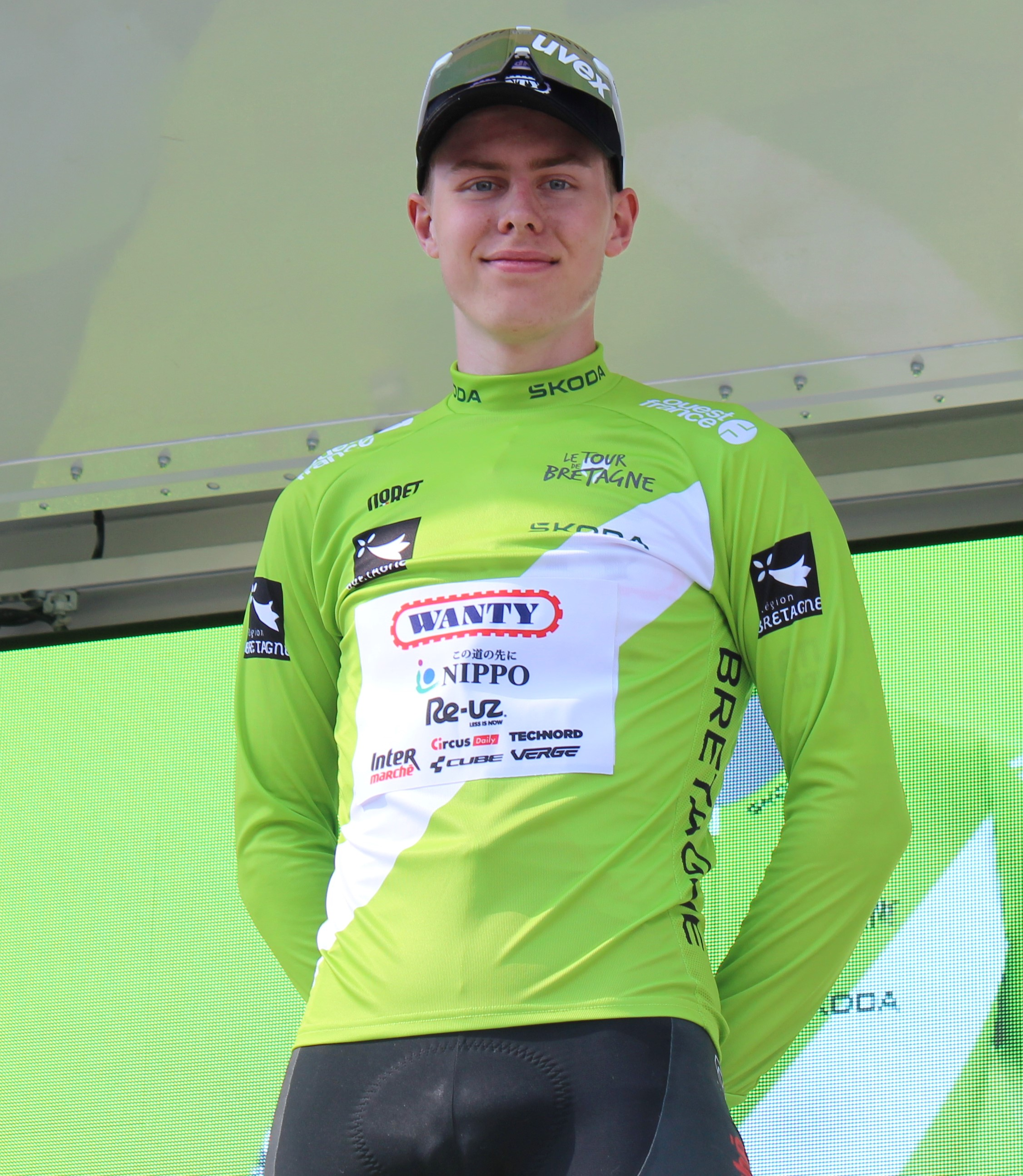
- Ørn-Kristoff at the 2025 Tour de Bretagne

Personal information
- Born: 15 March 2006 (age 20) Stavanger, Norway
- Height: 1.83 m (6 ft 0 in)
- Weight: 76 kg (168 lb)

Cycling career
- Sport: Cycling
- Current team: Lotto–Intermarché
- Discipline: Road
- Role: Rider

Amateur teams
- 2023: Stavanger SK Junior
- 2024: Avia–Rudyco Cycling Team

Professional teams
- 2025: Wanty–Nippo–ReUz
- 2026–: Lotto–Intermarché
Medal record
Representing Norway
Men's road bicycle racing
World Championships
Bronze medal – third place	2023 Glasgow	Junior road race
European Championships
Gold medal – first place	2024 Limburg	Junior road race

Felix Ørn-Kristoff (born 15 March 2006) is a Norwegian professional racing cyclist, who currently rides for UCI WorldTeam Lotto–Intermarché. He is the half-brother of Alexander Kristoff.

== Career ==
Ørn-Kristoff had a successful junior career, winning a bronze medal in the junior road race at the 2023 UCI Road World Championships and a gold medal in the same event at the 2024 European Road Championships. In 2025, he joined UCI Continental team Wanty–Nippo–ReUz, the development squad for UCI WorldTeam Intermarché–Wanty, for his first under-23 season. He signed a two year contract with the World Tour team beginning in 2026, before taking his first elite level victory at the Tour de Bretagne, winning stage four and the overall classification.

== Major results ==
2023
1st Overall Nation's Cup Hungary

1st Young rider classification
1st Stages 1, 2a & 2b (ITT)

1st Stage 2 Triptyque Ardennais Juniors
National Junior Road Championships

2nd Road race
5th Time trial

3rd Road race, UCI World Junior Road Championships
9th Road race, UEC European Junior Road Championships
2024
UEC European Junior Road Championships

1st Road race
3rd Team relay
9th Time trial

1st Time trial, National Junior Road Championships
Eroica Juniores

1st Stages 2 & 4

1st Stage 3 Ster van Zuid-Limburg
3rd Overall Saarland Trofeo

1st Stage 3a (ITT)

4th Overall Course de la Paix Juniors
5th Overall Nation's Cup Hungary
2025
1st Overall Tour de Bretagne

1st Young rider classification
1st Stage 4
