= Albert Philipsen =

Danish cyclist (born 2006)

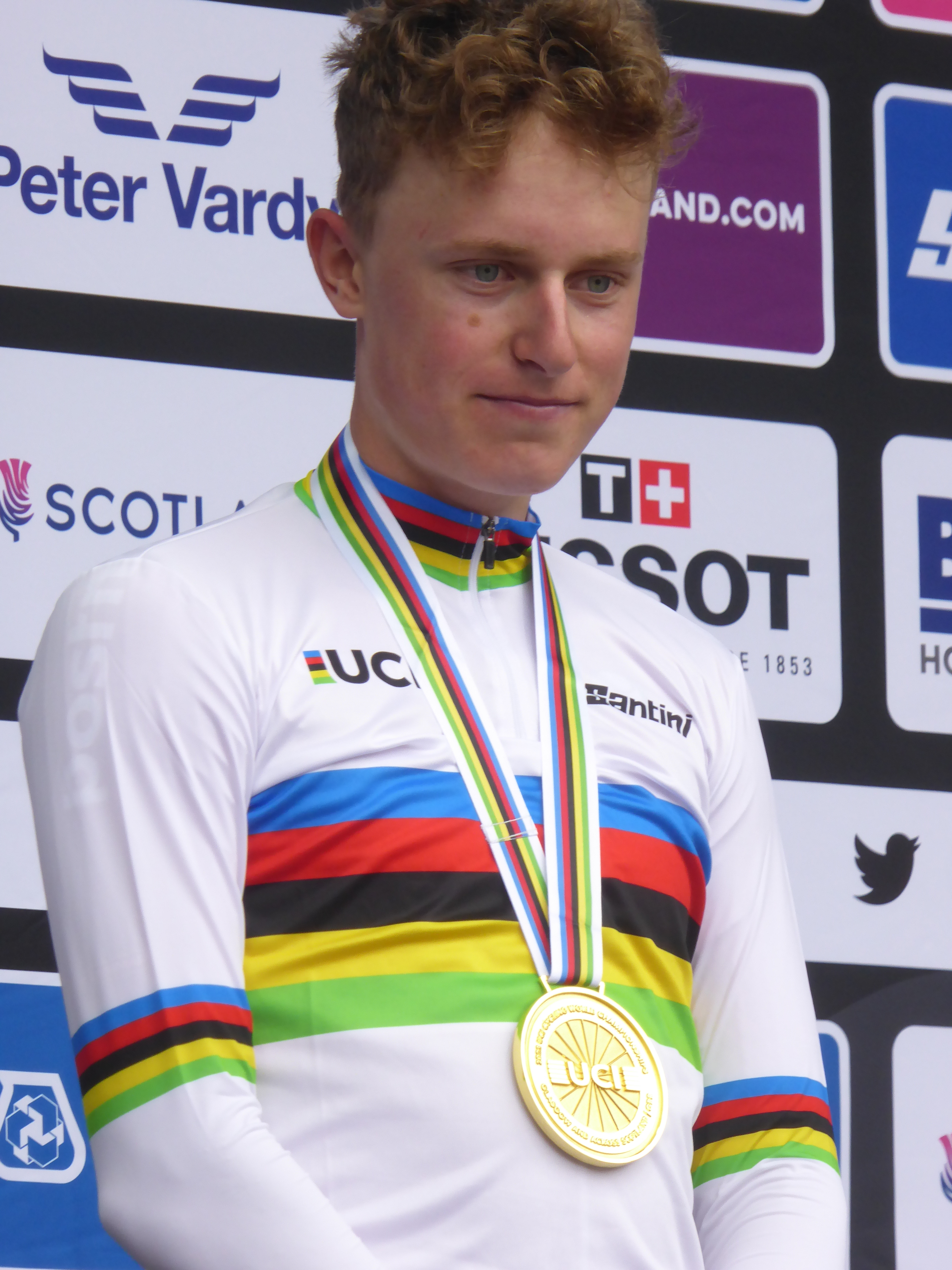

Personal information
- Full name: Albert Withen Philipsen
- Born: 3 September 2006 (age 20) Holte, Denmark
- Height: 1.84 m (6 ft 0 in)

Cycling career
- Sport: Cycling
- Current team: Lidl–Trek
- Disciplines: Road; Cyclo-cross; Mountain biking
- Role: Rider

Amateur teams
- 2013–2022: Holte MTB Klub
- 2023: Canyon CLLCTV (MTB/Cyclo-cross)
- 2023–2024: Tscherning Cycling Academy (road)

Professional team
- 2025–: Lidl–Trek
Medal record
Representing Denmark
Men's road bicycle racing
World Championships
Gold medal – first place	2023 Glasgow	Junior road race
European Championships
Gold medal – first place	2023 Drenthe	Junior time trial
Men's mountain bike racing
World Championships
Gold medal – first place	2023 Glasgow	Junior cross-country
Gold medal – first place	2024 Vallnord	Junior cross-country
Bronze medal – third place	2023 Glasgow	Team relay
European Championships
Gold medal – first place	2023 Anadia	Junior cross-country
Gold medal – first place	2023 Anadia	Team relay

Albert Withen Philipsen (born 3 September 2006) is a Danish cyclist, who competes in road racing, cyclo-cross and mountain biking. In 2023, he won the junior world road race and cross-country championships. This made him the youngest rider ever to win the junior world road race title. In December 2023, he signed a four-year contract with UCI WorldTeam Lidl–Trek beginning in 2025.

== Major results ==
=== Cyclo-cross ===
2022–2023
1st National Junior Championships
2023–2024
1st National Junior Championships
Junior X²O Badkamers Trophy

1st Hamme

1st Junior Aarhus I
1st Junior Aarhus II
5th UCI World Junior Championships

=== Mountain bike ===
2023
UCI World Championships

1st Junior cross-country
3rd Team relay

UEC European Championships

1st Junior cross-country
1st Team relay

1st Cross-country, National Junior Championships
1st Junior Randers
2024
1st Cross-country, UCI World Junior Championships
1st Cross-country, National Junior Championships
UCI Junior Series

1st Chelva
1st Banyoles
1st Nové Město

2025
2nd Cross-country, UEC European Under-23 Championships
2nd Cross-country, National Championships

=== Road ===
2023
1st Road race, UCI World Junior Championships
1st Time trial, UEC European Junior Championships
National Junior Championships

1st Road race
1st Time trial

4th Overall Course de la Paix Juniors

1st Points classification
1st Sprints classification

2024
1st Time trial, National Junior Championships
1st Overall Ain Bugey Valromey Tour

1st Points classification
1st Stages 1 & 3

1st Overall Course de la Paix Juniors

1st Stage 2a (ITT)

4th Paris–Roubaix Juniors
6th Time trial, UCI World Junior Championships
2025
1st Paris–Roubaix Espoirs
1st Young rider classification, Tour Down Under
2nd Tre Valli Varesine
3rd Overall Tour de Hongrie
3rd Paris–Tours
National Championships

4th Road race
4th Time trial

6th Eschborn–Frankfurt
10th Giro dell'Emilia
2026
8th Overall Tour de Romandie
8th Amstel Gold Race

==== Classics results timeline ====
Monument	2025	2026
Milan–San Remo	—	—
Tour of Flanders	—	—
Paris–Roubaix	—	—
Liège–Bastogne–Liège	—	
Giro di Lombardia	—	
Classic	2025	2026
Omloop Het Nieuwsblad	—	112
Strade Bianche	25	DNF
Amstel Gold Race	—	8
Eschborn–Frankfurt	6	
Giro dell'Emilia	10	
Tre Valli Varesine	2	
Paris–Tours	3	

Legend
—	Did not compete
DNF	Did not finish
