= Pavel Novák =

Czech cyclist (born 2004)

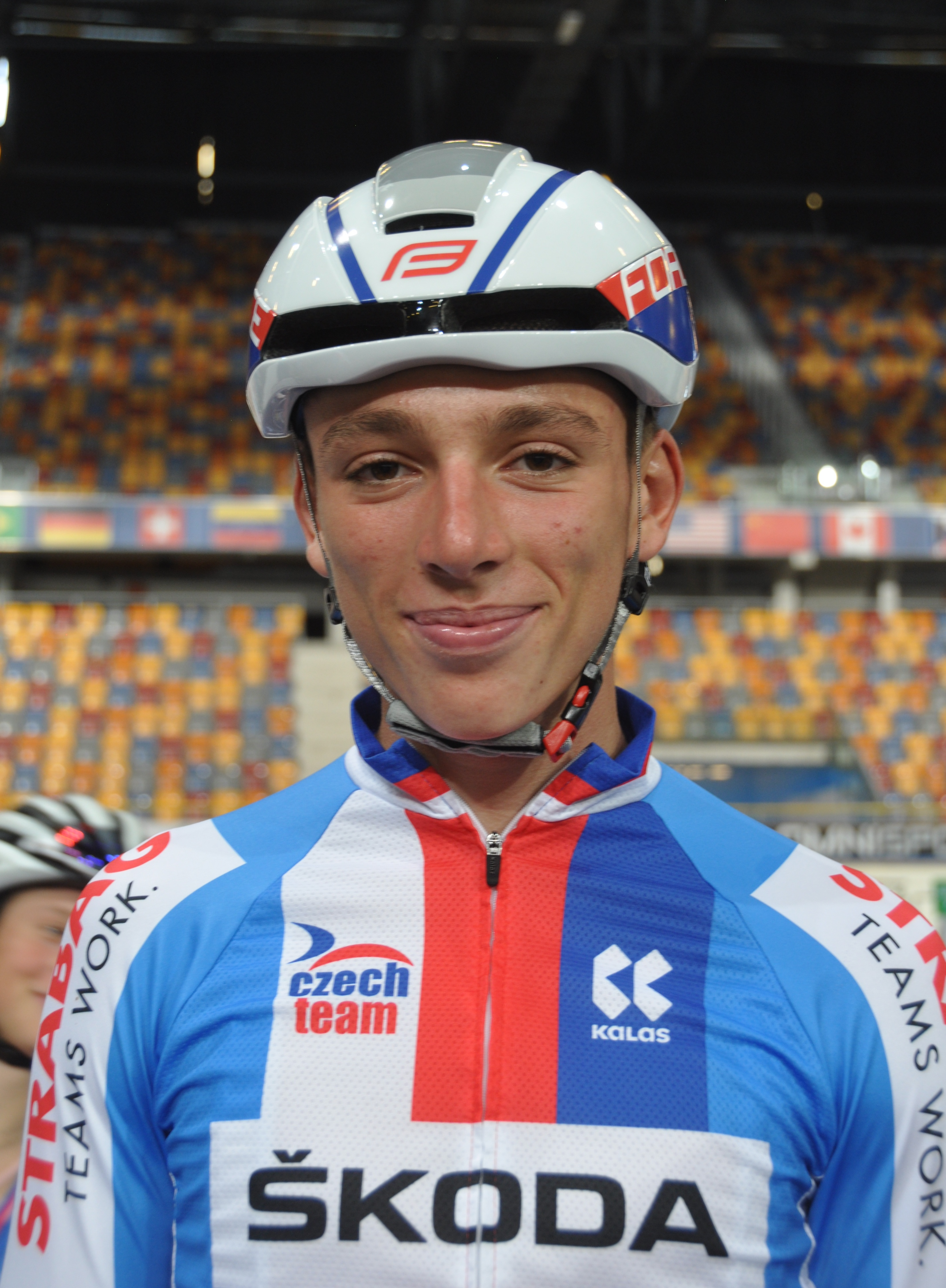
- Novák in 2021

Personal information
- Born: 3 December 2004 (age 21) Jindřichův Hradec, Czech Republic
- Height: 1.81 m (5 ft 11 in)
- Weight: 64 kg (141 lb)

Cycling career
- Sport: Cycling
- Current team: MBH Bank CSB Telecom Fort
- Discipline: Road
- Role: Rider
- Rider type: Climber

Amateur teams
- 2020: RBB Invest Force
- 2021: Tufo–Pardus Prostějov Juniors
- 2022: Ciclistica Trevigliese

Professional teams
- 2023–: Team Colpack–Ballan–CSB
- 2023: Q36.5 Pro Cycling Team (stagiaire)
- 2024: Team Jayco–AlUla (stagiaire)

Pavel Novák (born 3 December 2004) is a Czech racing cyclist, who currently rides for UCI Continental team MBH Bank CSB Telecom Fort.

== Major results ==
2021
2nd Overall Medzinárodné dni cyklistiky Dubnica nad Váhom
2022
National Junior Road Championships

1st Time trial
2nd Road race

6th Overall Course de la Paix Juniors
7th Trofeo Buffoni
8th Time trial, UEC European Junior Road Championships
8th Overall Grand Prix Rüebliland
10th Road race, UCI Road World Junior Championships
10th Giro di Primavera
2023
2nd Bassano–Montegrappa
5th Sulle strade di Marco Pantani
6th Giro della Valle d'Aosta
8th Astico–Brenta
2024
1st Trofeo Piva
5th Overall Giro Next Gen
6th GP Palio del Recioto
7th Trofeo Città di San Vendemiano
2025
1st Bassano–Montegrappa
2nd GP Capodarco
3rd Overall Giro Next Gen

1st Stage 7

6th Overall Tour de Hongrie
7th Memorial Daniele Tortoli
10th GP Palio del Recioto
