= Lorenzo Milesi =

Italian cyclist

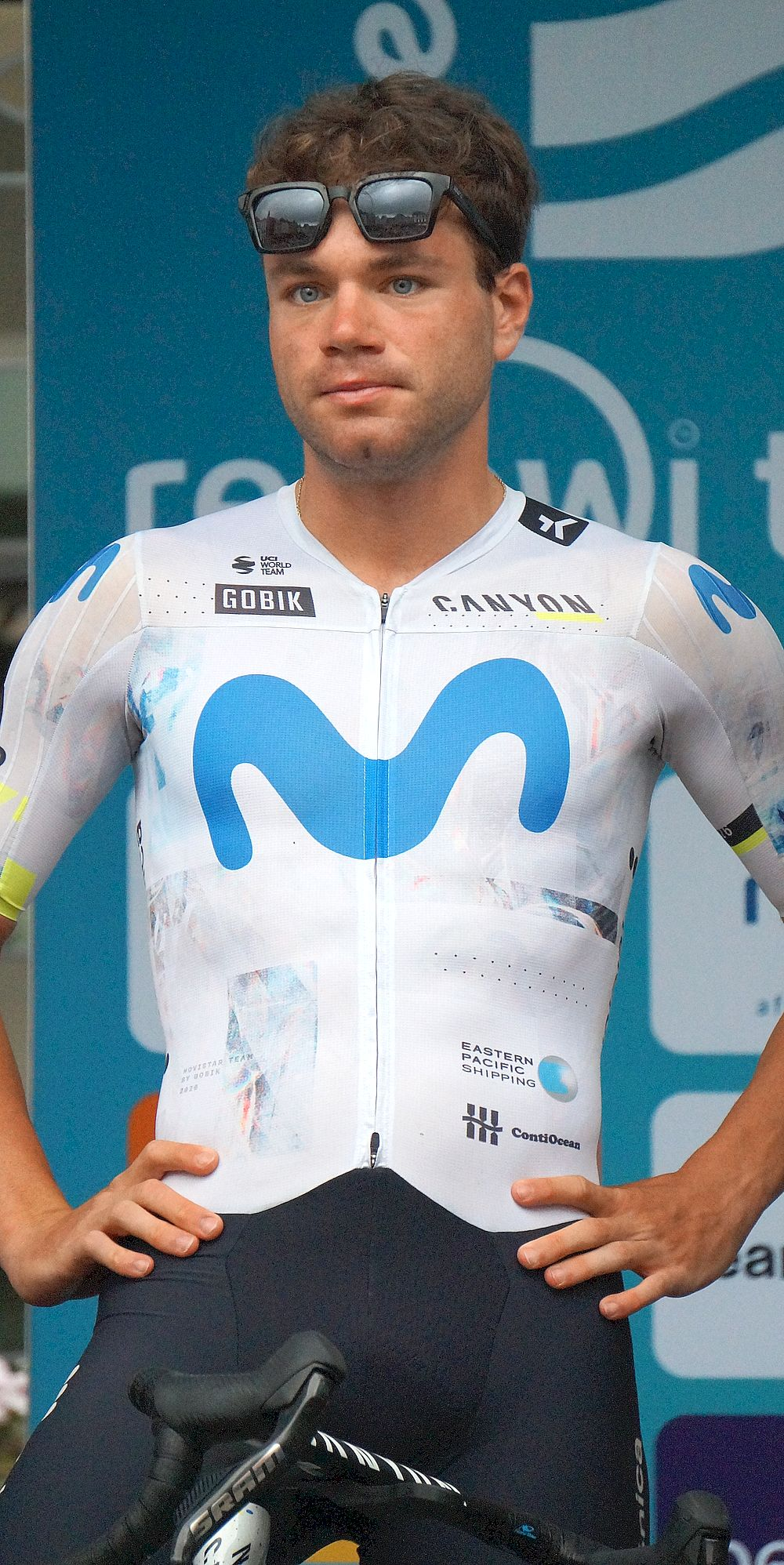
- Lorenzo Milesi in 2026

Personal information
- Born: 19 March 2002 (age 24) San Giovanni Bianco, Italy
- Height: 1.80 m (5 ft 11 in)
- Weight: 70 kg (154 lb)

Cycling career
- Sport: Cycling
- Current team: Movistar Team
- Discipline: Road
- Role: Rider

Amateur teams
- 2019: Pedale Brembillese
- 2019–2020: Ciclistica Trevigliese

Professional teams
- 2021: Beltrami TSA–Tre Colli
- 2022: Development Team DSM
- 2023: Team dsm–firmenich
- 2024–: Movistar Team

Major wins
- Grand Tours Vuelta a España 1 TTT stage (2023)
Medal record
Representing Italy
Men's road bicycle racing
World Championships
Gold medal – first place	2023 Glasgow	Under-23 time trial
European Championships
Silver medal – second place	2025 Guilherand-Granges	Mixed team relay
Bronze medal – third place	2020 Plouay	Junior time trial

Lorenzo Milesi (born 19 March 2002) is an Italian professional cyclist who rides for UCI WorldTeam Movistar Team.

== Major results ==
2019
2nd Time trial, National Junior Road Championships
2020
1st Time trial, National Junior Road Championships
3rd Time trial, UEC European Junior Road Championships
3rd Trofeo Buffoni
2022
Le Triptyque des Monts et Châteaux

1st Mountains classification
1st Stages 1 & 3a (ITT)

1st Stage 9 Tour de l'Avenir
7th Time trial, UEC European Under-23 Road Championships
10th Time trial, UCI Road World Under-23 Championships
2023
UCI Road World Under-23 Championships

1st Time trial
5th Road race

Vuelta a España

1st Stage 1 (TTT)
Held & after Stage 1

2024
2nd Memorial Marco Pantani
2025
5th Memorial Marco Pantani
5th Coppa Agostoni

=== Grand Tour general classification results timeline ===
Grand Tour	2023	2024	2025	2026
Giro d'Italia	—	85	88	49
Tour de France	—	—	—	
Vuelta a España	DNF	—	—	

Legend
—	Did not compete
DNF	Did not finish
