= Peace Race Juniors =

Czech Republic cycling race

Race details
- Date: May
- Region: Czech Republic
- Local name: Course de la Paix Juniors
- Discipline: Road race
- Competition: UCI Junior Nations' Cup
- Type: Stage race
- Web site: www.zmj.cz

History
- First edition: 1965
- Editions: 52 (as of 2024)
- First winner: Fritz Germin (AUT)
- Most wins: Peter Velits (SVK); Michał Kwiatkowski (POL); (2 wins)
- Most recent: Albert Philipsen (DEN)

The Peace Race Juniors, officially known as the Course de la Paix Juniors, is a junior (ages 17-18) multi-day cycling race held annually in the Czech Republic. It is part of the UCI Junior Nations' Cup, and is the junior version of the Peace Race, which was contested between 1948 and 2006.

== Winners ==
Year	Winner	Second	Third
1965	(Austria) Fritz Germin		
1966	(Czechoslovakia) Petr Hladík		
1967-1973	No race		
1974	(Soviet Union) Vladimir Chapovalov		
1975	(Soviet Union) Ivan Romanov		
1976	(Czechoslovakia) Jiří Korous		
1977	(Italy) Alessandro Paganessi		
1978	(East Germany) Falk Boden		
1979	(Italy) Alberto Molinari		
1980	(Czechoslovakia) Vladimír Kozárek		
1981	(East Germany) Berndt Pfister		
1982	(East Germany) Christian Jager		
1983	(Czechoslovakia) Roman Kreuziger		
1984	(Czechoslovakia) Ondřej Glajza		
1985	(Soviet Union) Leonid Lebedëv		
1986	(Czechoslovakia) Miroslav Lipták		
1987	(Czechoslovakia) Luboš Pekárek		
1988	(Czechoslovakia) František Trkal		
1989	(Czechoslovakia) Petr Cirkl		
1990	(Germany) Danilo Klaar		
1991	(Czechoslovakia) Jiří Pospíšil		
1992	(Czechoslovakia) Petr Herman		
1993	(Estonia) Janek Ermal		
1994	(Russia) Dmitri Parfimovitch		
1995	(Russia) Denis Menchov		
1996	(Russia) Denis Bondarenko		
1997	(Germany) Christian Werner		
1998	(Czech Republic) Michal Moureček		
1999	(Switzerland) Fabian Cancellara		
2000	(Poland) Piotr Mazur		
2001	(Germany) Sven Krauss		
2002	(Slovakia) Peter Velits	(Russia) Dmitry Kozontchuk	(Poland) Igor Klak
2003	(Slovakia) Peter Velits	(Russia) Maxim Belkov	(Czech Republic) Zdeněk Štybar
2004	(Czech Republic) Roman Kreuziger	(Slovenia) Simon Špilak	(Denmark) Anders Berendt Hansen
2005	(Estonia) Tanel Kangert	(Denmark) André Steensen	(Estonia) Rein Taaramäe
2006	(Czech Republic) Martin Hačecký	(Slovakia) Róbert Gavenda	(Czech Republic) Jakob Kratochvíla
2007	(Poland) Michał Kwiatkowski	(Austria) Matthias Brändle	(Germany) Fabian Schaar
2008	(Poland) Michał Kwiatkowski	(Slovakia) Peter Sagan	(Belgium) Eliot Lietaer
2009	(Poland) Łukasz Wiśniowski	(Germany) Nikias Arndt	(Netherlands) Wilco Kelderman
2010	(Russia) Evgeny Shalunov	(Denmark) Asbjørn Kragh Andersen	(Czech Republic) Petr Vakoč
2011	(Denmark) Magnus Cort Nielsen	(Russia) Alexey Rybalkin	(France) Olivier Le Gac
2012	(Denmark) Niklas Eg	(Denmark) Søren Kragh Andersen	(Russia) Ildar Arslanov
2013	(Denmark) Mads Pedersen	(United States) Logan Owen	(Netherlands) Mathieu van der Poel
2014	(Denmark) Magnus Bak Klaris	(France) Rayane Bouhanni	(United States) William Barta
2015	(United States) Brandon McNulty	(United States) Adrien Costa	(Russia) Nikolai Ilichev
2016	(United States) Christopher Blevins	(Russia) Evgenii Kazanov	(Slovenia) Jaka Primožič
2017	(Norway) Idar Andersen	(Norway) Andreas Leknessund	(Italy) Andrea Bagioli
2018	(Belgium) Remco Evenepoel	(Denmark) Mattias Skjelmose Jensen	(Norway) Ludvig Aasheim
2019	(France) Hugo Toumire	(Germany) Maurice Ballerstedt	(Italy) Andrea Piccolo
2020	Cancelled		
2021	(Norway) Per Strand Hagenes	(Germany) Emil Herzog	(Belgium) Cian Uijtdebroeks
2022	(Germany) Emil Herzog	(Portugal) António Morgado	(Norway) Jørgen Nordhagen
2023	(Norway) Jørgen Nordhagen	(United States) Andrew August	(Netherlands) Senna Remijn
2024	(Denmark) Albert Philipsen	(Netherlands) Senna Remijn	(Czech Republic) Pavel Šumpík
