= Oscar Chamberlain =

Australian cyclist (born 2005)

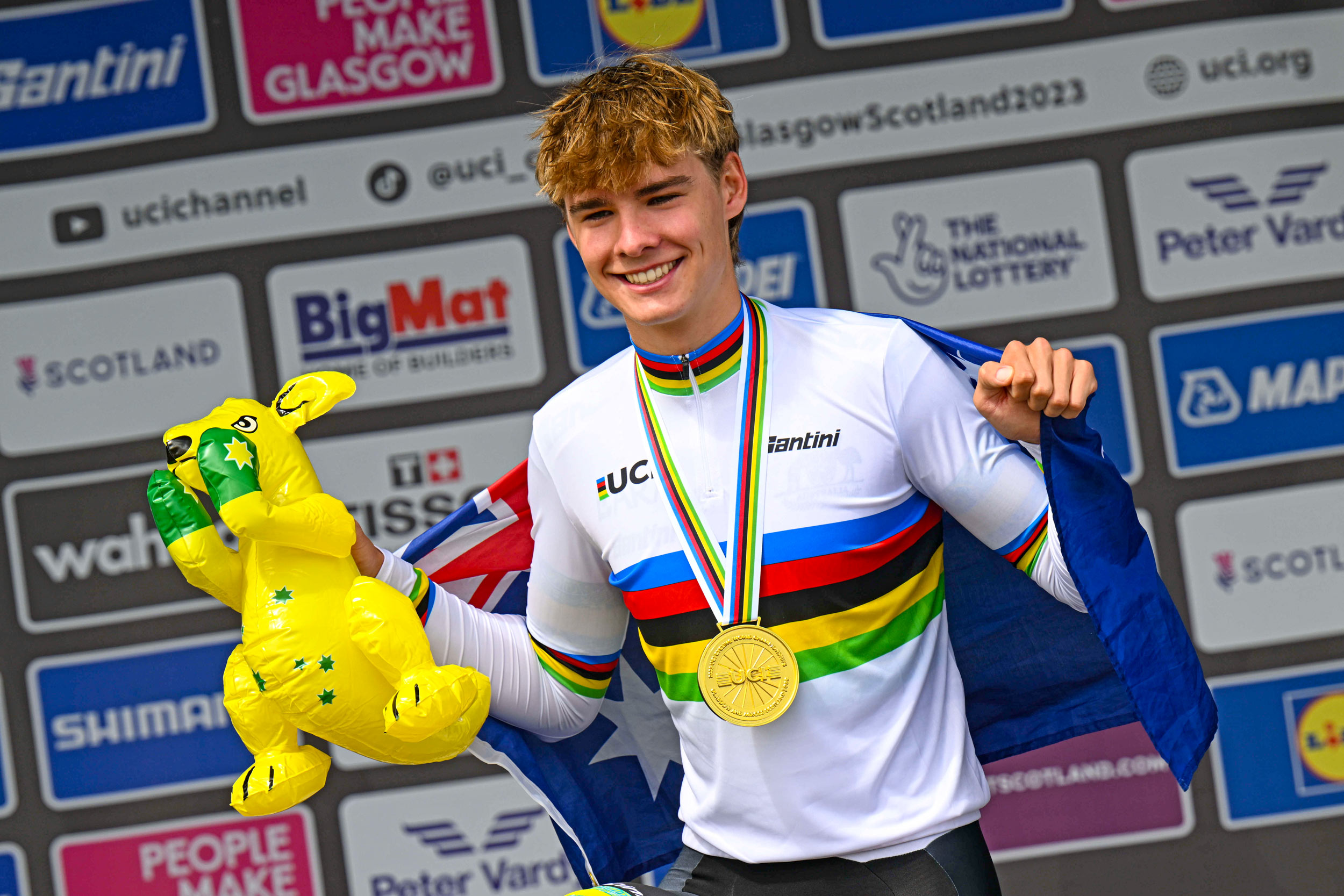
- Chamberlain in 2025

Personal information
- Born: 15 January 2005 (age 21) Canberra, Australia
- Height: 1.94 m (6 ft 4 in)
- Weight: 74 kg (163 lb)

Cycling career
- Sport: Cycling
- Current team: Decathlon CMA CGM Team
- Discipline: Road
- Role: Rider
- Rider type: Time trialist

Amateur teams
- 2022: Cannibal Team
- 2023: AG2R Citroën U19 Team

Professional teams
- 2024: Decathlon–AG2R La Mondiale Development Team
- 2025–: Decathlon–AG2R La Mondiale
Medal record
Representing Australia
Men's road bicycle racing
World Championships
Gold medal – first place	2023 Stirling	Junior time trial

Oscar Chamberlain (born 15 January 2005) is an Australian road cyclist, who rides for UCI WorldTeam Decathlon CMA CGM Team. He won the junior time trial at the 2023 UCI Road World Championships.

== Major results ==
2022
Oceania Junior Road Championships

1st Road race
3rd Time trial

1st E3 Saxo Bank Classic Juniors
2nd Road race, National Junior Road Championships
9th Overall Watersley Junior Challenge

1st Young riders classification

2023
UCI Road World Junior Championships

1st Time trial
10th Road race

National Junior Championships

1st Time trial
4th Road race

1st Overall Watersley Junior Challenge

1st Stage 1 (ITT)

2nd Overall Guido Reybrouck Classic
2nd Paris–Roubaix Juniors
3rd Overall Sint-Martinusprijs Kontich
6th Overall LVM Saarland Trofeo
7th Overall Driedaagse van Axel

1st Points classification

2024
National Under-23 Road Championships

3rd Time trial
4th Road race

2026
3rd Road race, National Road Championships
