= António Morgado =

Portuguese cyclist

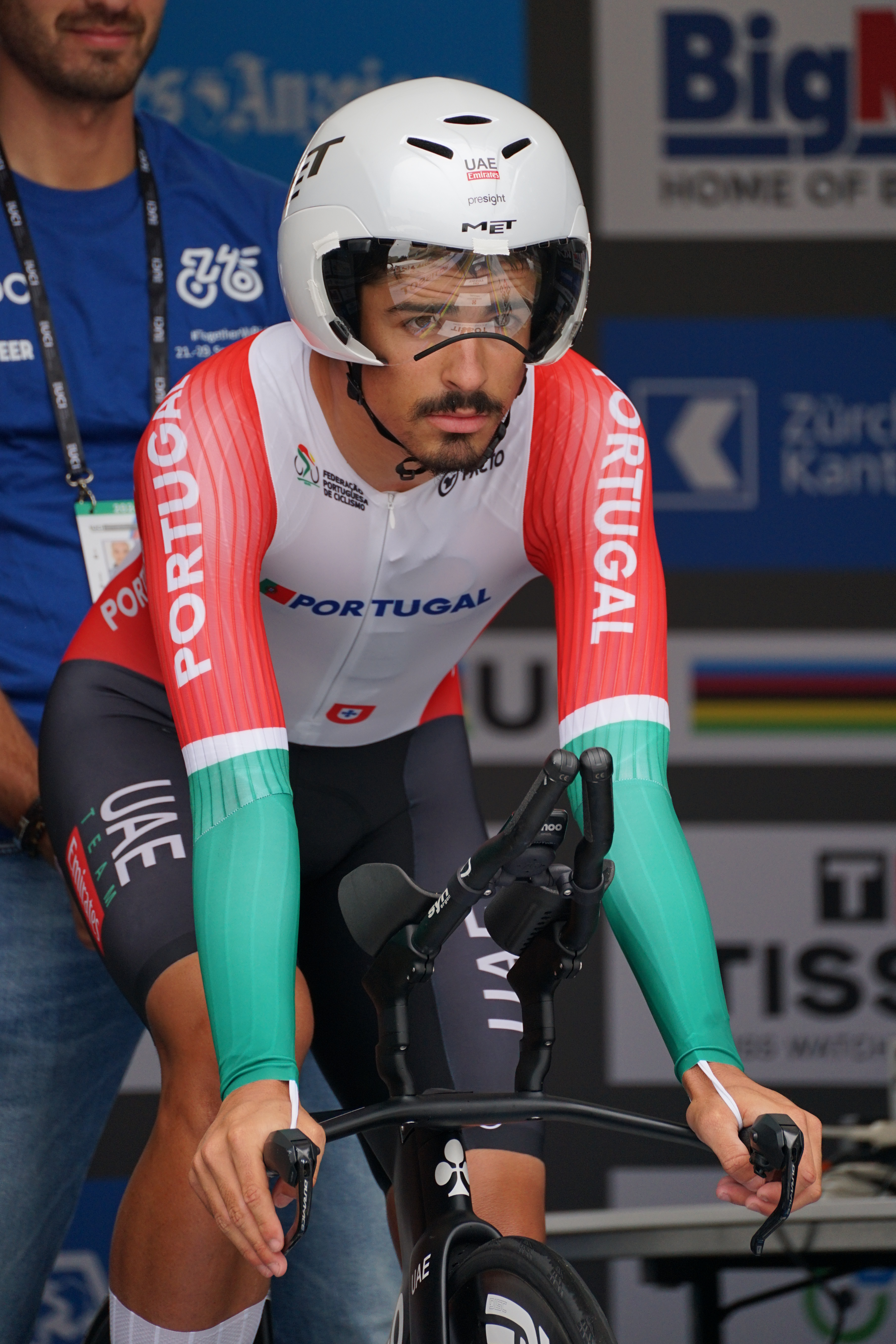
- Morgado at the 2024 World Championships

Personal information
- Born: January 28, 2004 (age 22) Caldas da Rainha, Portugal
- Height: 1.80 m (5 ft 11 in)
- Weight: 71 kg (157 lb; 11 st 3 lb)

Cycling career
- Sport: Cycling
- Current team: UAE Team Emirates XRG
- Discipline: Road
- Role: Rider

Amateur team
- 2021–2022: Bairrada Cycling Team

Professional teams
- 2023: Hagens Berman Axeon
- 2024–: UAE Team Emirates

Major wins
- One-day races and Classics National Time Trial Championships (2024, 2025, 2026) Figueira Champions Classic (2025, 2026)
Medal record
Men's road cycling
Representing Portugal
World Championships
Silver medal – second place	2023 Glasgow	Under-23 road race
Silver medal – second place	2022 Wollongong	Junior road race

António Tomas Morgado (born 28 January 2004) is a Portuguese road cyclist, who currently rides for UCI WorldTeam UAE Team Emirates XRG.

== Career ==
At the 2022 UCI Road World Championships held in Wollongong, Australia, Morgado won a silver medal in the men's junior road race after he was outsprinted by Emil Herzog at the line.

After a highly successful two years as a junior, Morgado was recruited by UCI Continental team Hagens Berman Axeon for 2023. That season, he won the International Tour of Rhodes and repeated his performance at the World Championships, winning another silver medal, this time in the under-23 road race.

The following season, he joined UCI WorldTeam UAE Team Emirates on a four-year contract. After finishing fifth in the Tour of Flanders in late March, he took his first pro win at the newly revived Giro della Romagna three weeks later.

== Major results ==
António Morgado wearing the National jersey in 2026

2021
National Junior Road Championships

1st Time trial
2nd Road race

1st Overall Volta a Portugal Juniores

1st Points classification
1st Mountains classification
1st Young rider classification
1st Stages 1 & 3 (ITT)

1st Overall Vuelta al Besaya

1st Points classification
1st Young rider classification
1st Stages 3 & 4

1st Overall Volta ao Concelho de Loulé

1st Points classification
1st Young rider classification
1st Stage 2

1st Overall Ruta do Albariño

1st Prologue

1st Gipuzkoa Klasika
2nd Overall Bizkaiko Itzulia

1st Points classification
1st Stages 2 & 4 (ITT)

2nd Overall Vuelta a Valladolid
6th Road race, UCI Junior Road World Championships
2022
National Junior Road Championships

1st Road race
1st Time trial

1st Overall Volta ao Concelho de Loulé

1st Points classification
1st Mountains classification
1st Stage 2 & 3 (TTT)

1st Overall Vuelta al Besaya

1st Points classification
1st Mountains classification
1st Stages 1 & 3

1st Overall Volta a Portugal Juniores

1st Mountains classification
1st Stages 3 (ITT) & 5

1st Overall Grande Prémio do Minho

1st Points classification
1st Stage 3

1st Overall Ruta do Albariño

1st Prologue & Stage 1

1st Overall Vuelta a Valladolid

1st Stages 1 & 2 (ITT)

1st Overall Vuelta Ribera del Duero

1st Stages 1 & 3

1st Overall Giro della Lunigiana

1st Mountains classification

2nd Road race, UCI Junior Road World Championships
2nd Overall Course de la Paix Juniors

1st Mountains classification

2nd Overall Gipuzkoa Klasikoa
2nd Overall Trophée Centre Morbihan
4th Overall Tour du Pays de Vaud
9th Time trial, UEC European Junior Road Championships
2023
1st Time trial, National Under-23 Road Championships
1st Overall International Tour of Rhodes

1st Young rider classification

2nd Road race, UCI Road World Under-23 Championships
4th Overall Circuit des Ardennes
4th Piccolo Giro di Lombardia
6th Overall Orlen Nations Grand Prix

1st Stage 5

8th Coppa Città di San Daniele
2024 (3 pro wins)
1st Time trial, National Road Championships
1st Giro della Romagna
1st Stage 2 Vuelta a Asturias
2nd Le Samyn
5th Tour of Flanders
10th Overall Volta ao Algarve

1st Young rider classification

2025 (3)
1st Time trial, National Road Championships
1st Figueira Champions Classic
1st Gran Premio Castellón
3rd Brabantse Pijl
3rd Clàssica Comunitat Valenciana 1969
3rd Prueba Villafranca de Ordizia
3rd Trofeo Calvià
6th Trofeo Serra Tramuntana
7th Hamburg Cyclassics
10th Vuelta a Castilla y León
2026 (3)
1st Time trial, National Road Championships
1st Figueira Champions Classic
1st Trofeo Calvià
2nd Trofeo Serra Tramuntana
4th Trofeo Andratx–Pollença
7th Trofeo Laigueglia
10th Nokere Koerse
