= Hamish McKenzie (cyclist) =

Australian cyclist (born 2004)

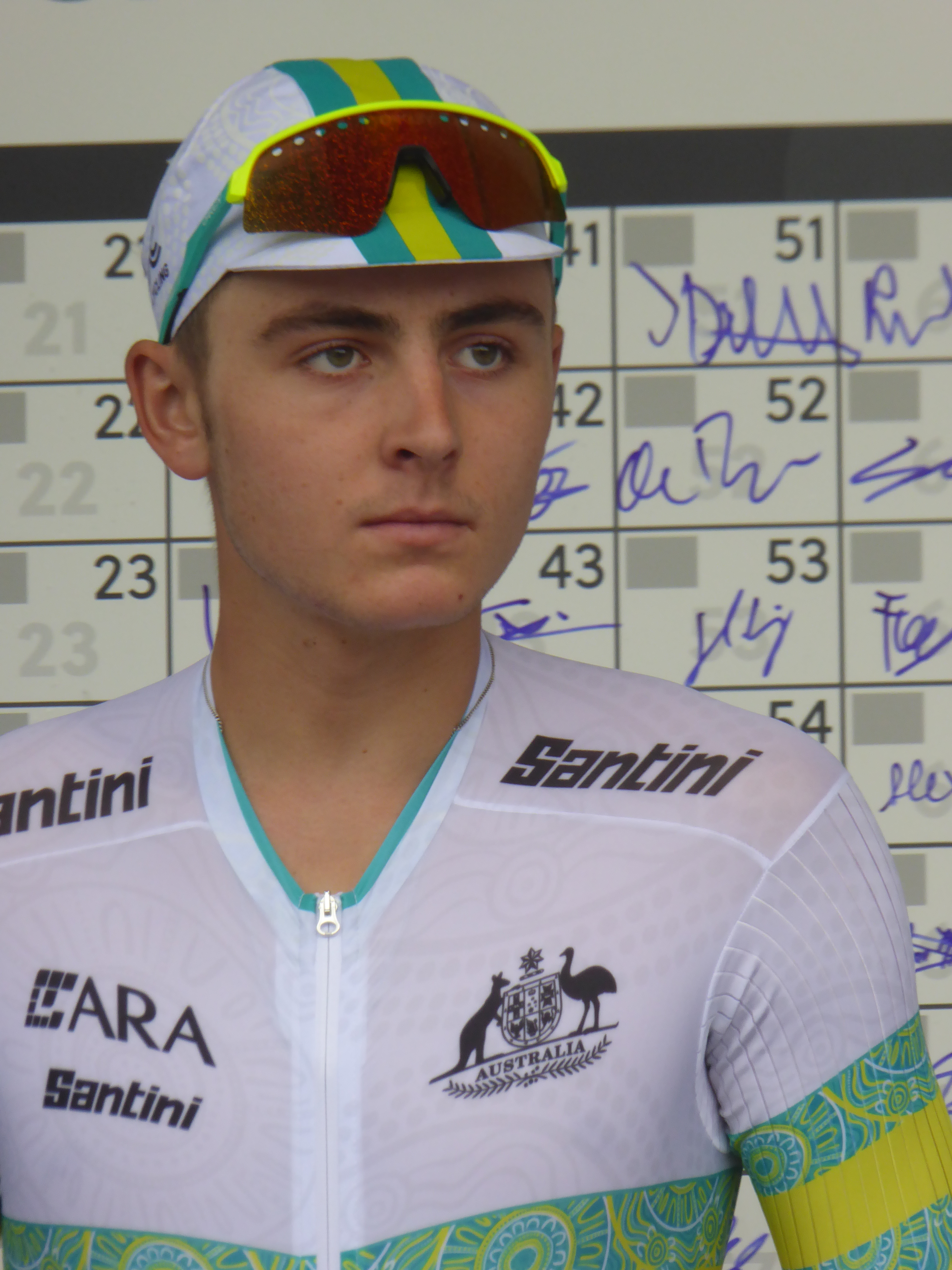
- McKenzie in 2023

Personal information
- Born: 13 September 2004 (age 22) Launceston, Tasmania, Australia
- Height: 1.76 m (5 ft 9 in)
- Weight: 70 kg (154 lb)

Cycling career
- Sport: Cycling
- Current team: Team Jayco–AlUla
- Discipline: Road
- Role: Rider
- Rider type: Time trialist

Amateur team
- 2018: Nero–KOM Financial Advice Racing

Professional teams
- 2023: ARA Skip Capital
- 2023: Team Jayco–AlUla (stagiaire)
- 2024–2025: Hagens Berman Jayco
- 2026–: Team Jayco–AlUla
Medal record
Representing Australia
Men's road bicycle racing
World Championships
Silver medal – second place	2022 Wollongong	Junior time trial
Bronze medal – third place	2023 Glasgow	Under-23 time trial

Hamish McKenzie (born 13 September 2004) is an Australian cyclist, who currently rides for UCI WorldTeam Team Jayco–AlUla.

== Career ==
McKenzie progressed through the Australian Cycling Academy (ARA) set-up, riding for ARA Skip Capital in 2023 before joining Hagens Berman Jayco for 2024–25. He will step up to the UCI WorldTeam level with Team Jayco–AlUla on a two-year contract beginning in 2026, as part of a development pathway agreed between the Australian Cycling Academy and GreenEDGE Cycling.

As a junior he won silver in the men’s junior individual time trial at the 2022 UCI Road World Championships in Wollongong. In the under-23 category he later took bronze in the time trial at the 2023 UCI Road World Championships in Glasgow, and placed 10th in the under-23 individual time trial in 2025.

== Major results ==
2022
National Junior Road Championships

1st Time trial
1st Criterium

2nd Time trial, UCI Junior Road World Championships
2nd Overall Tour of Gippsland Juniors

1st Stage 3

2023
2nd Time trial, Oceania Under-23 Road Championships
3rd Time trial, UCI Road World Under-23 Championships
5th Road race, Oceania Road Championships
2024
2nd Time trial, National Under-23 Road Championships
2025
10th Time trial, UCI Road World Under-23 Championships
