= Senna Remijn =

Dutch cyclist

Personal information
- Born: 22 January 2006 (age 20) Wolphaartsdijk, the Netherlands
- Height: 1.87 m (6 ft 2 in)
- Weight: 68 kg (150 lb)

Cycling career
- Sport: Cycling
- Current team: Alpecin–Premier Tech
- Disciplines: Cyclo-cross; Road
- Role: Rider

Amateur team
- 2023–2024: Acrog–Tormans

Professional teams
- 2025: Alpecin–Deceuninck Development Team
- 2026–: Alpecin–Premier Tech
Medal record
Representing Netherlands
Men's road bicycle racing
World Championships
Bronze medal – third place	2024 Zurich	Junior road race
Men's cyclo-cross
World Championships
Silver medal – second place	2023 Hoogerheide	Junior race

Senna Remijn (born 22 January 2006) is a Dutch cyclo-cross and road cyclist, who from 1 January 2026 on rides for UCI WorldTeam Alpecin–Premier Tech.

In 2023, he won the silver medal in the junior race at the UCI Cyclo-cross World Championships, and in 2024 the bronze medal in the junior road race at the UCI Road World Championships. He finished third in the Peace Race Juniors in 2023, and second in 2024. He was the 2024 junior Dutch cyclocross champion.

As member of the Alpecin development team, he rode the professional stage race 2025 Tour de Luxembourg, and finished third in the final stage. In the U23 category in 2025, he finished 2nd in the Liège–Bastogne–Liège U23 race, and 3rd in Paris–Roubaix Espoirs. In November 2025, he received the Gerrie Knetemann trophy for the most promising young Dutch cyclist.

== Major results ==
=== Road ===
2023
1st Tour du Condroz
1st Pévèle Classics
1st Stage 3 Tour du Valromey
3rd Overall Course de la Paix Juniors

1st Young rider classification
1st Stage 4

5th Time trial, National Junior Championships
9th E3 Saxo Bank Classic Juniors
10th Overall Watersley Junior Challenge
2024
2nd Time trial, National Junior Championships
2nd Overall Course de la Paix Juniors
2nd Overall Vuelta al Besaya

1st Stages 1 & 2

2nd Pévèle Classics
3rd Road race, UCI World Junior Championships
6th Overall Aubel–Thimister–Stavelot

1st Stages 1 & 2a (TTT)

7th Overall Eroica Juniores – Nations' Cup

1st Stage 1b

8th E3 Saxo Classic Juniors
10th Overall Tour du Pays de Vaud
2025
2nd Liège–Bastogne–Liège U23
3rd Paris–Roubaix Espoirs
5th Road race, European Under-23 Championships
7th Flèche Ardennaise
2026
8th NXT Classic

=== Cyclo-cross ===
2022–2023
2nd UCI World Junior Championships
2nd National Junior Championships
2023–2024
1st National Junior Championships
5th Overall UCI Junior World Cup

2nd Hoogerheide
