= Lewis Bower =

British cyclist

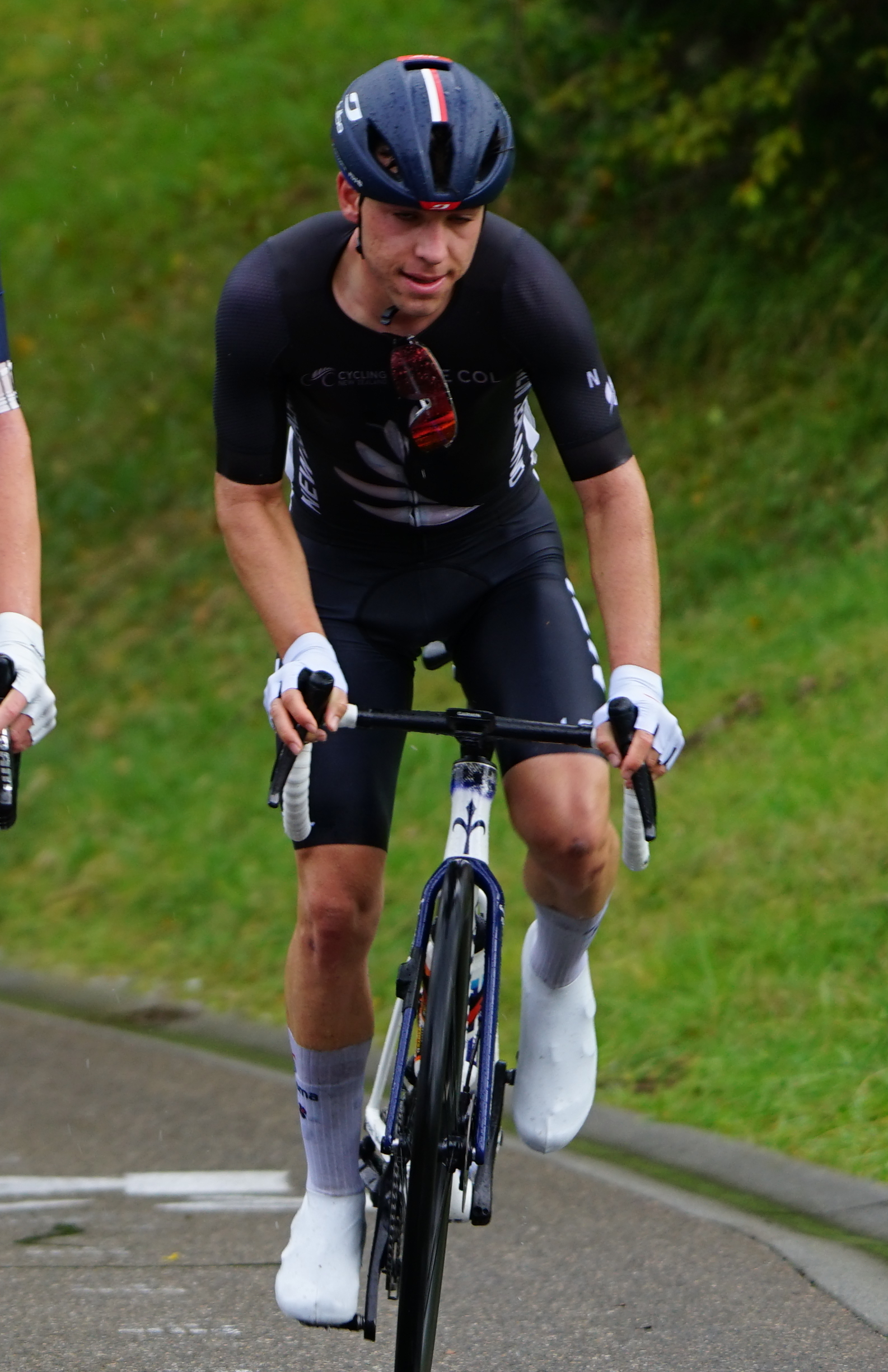
- Bower at the 2024 UCI Road World Championships

Personal information
- Born: 14 October 2004 (age 22) Auckland, New Zealand
- Height: 1.72 m (5 ft 8 in)
- Weight: 63 kg (139 lb)

Cycling career
- Sport: Cycling
- Current team: Groupama–FDJ United
- Discipline: Road
- Role: Rider

Amateur teams
- 2021: Gaverzicht–Be Okay Juniors
- 2022: EFC–L&R–AGS Juniors

Professional teams
- 2023–2025: Équipe Continentale Groupama–FDJ
- 2025–: Groupama–FDJ

Lewis Bower (born 14 October 2004) is a New Zealand cyclist, who currently rides for UCI WorldTeam Groupama–FDJ United.

== Major results ==
2021
1st Time trial, National Junior Road Championships
2022
1st Time trial, National Junior Road Championships
Oceania Junior Road Championships

4th Road race
4th Time trial

8th Overall SPIE Internationale Juniorendriedaagse
2023
1st Paris–Chalette–Vierzon
4th Time trial, National Under-23 Road Championships
5th Lake Taupo Cycle Challenge
10th Grand Prix de la ville de Pérenchies
2024
1st Stages 3 & 5 Turul Romaniei
1st Stage 1 Ronde de l'Oise
3rd Time trial, National Under-23 Road Championships
9th Gent–Wevelgem U23
2025
1st Boucle de l'Artois
4th Time trial, National Under-23 Road Championships
5th Le Tour des 100 Communes
