= Emil Herzog =

German cyclist (born 2004)

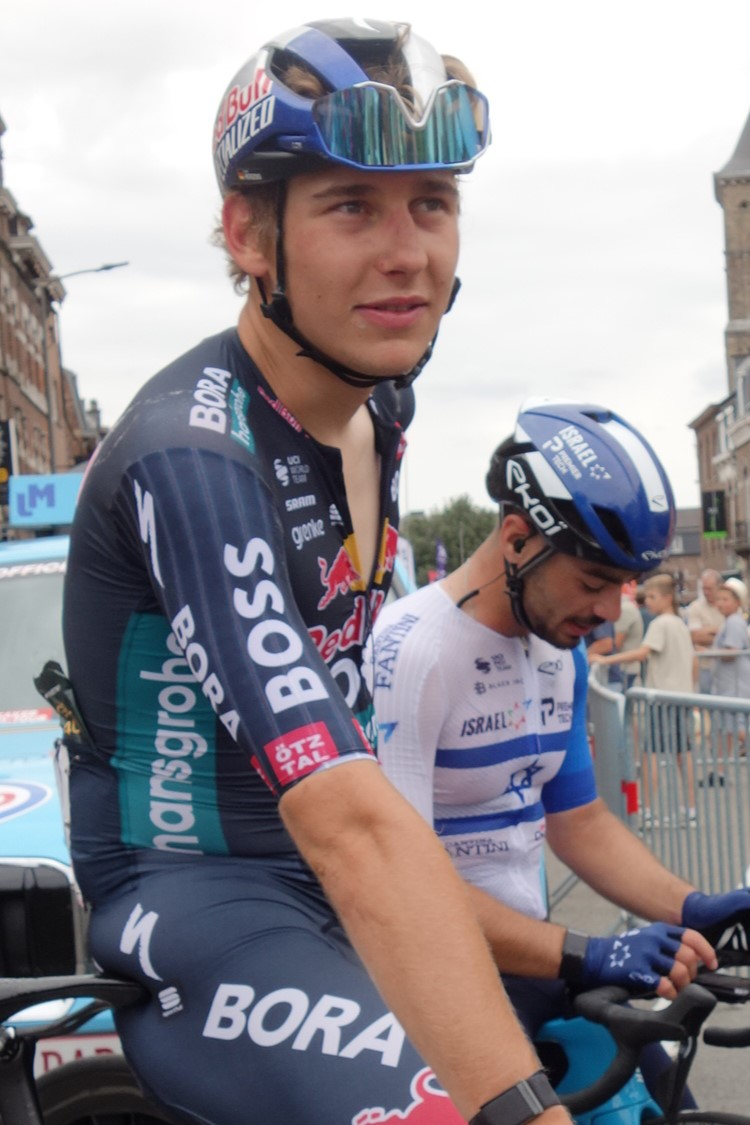
- Herzog in 2024

Personal information
- Born: 6 October 2004 (age 22) Weiler-Simmerberg, Germany
- Height: 1.83 m (6 ft 0 in)
- Weight: 74 kg (163 lb)

Cycling career
- Sport: Cycling
- Current team: Red Bull–Bora–Hansgrohe
- Discipline: Road
- Role: Rider

Amateur teams
- 2017–2020: Rad-Union 1913 Wangen
- 2021–2022: Team Auto Eder

Professional teams
- 2023: Hagens Berman Axeon
- 2024–: Bora–Hansgrohe
Medal record
Men's road cycling
Representing Germany
World Championships
Gold medal – first place	2022 Wollongong	Junior road race
Bronze medal – third place	2022 Wollongong	Junior time trial
European Championships
Bronze medal – third place	2022 Anadia	Junior time trial

Emil Herzog (born 6 October 2004) is a German road cyclist, who currently rides for UCI WorldTeam Red Bull–Bora–Hansgrohe. He won the junior road race at the 2022 UCI Road World Championships.

== Major results ==
2021
1st Time trial, National Junior Road Championships
2nd Overall Course de la Paix Juniors

1st Young rider classification

3rd Overall Aubel–Thimister–Stavelot

1st Young rider classification
1st Stage 2a (TTT)

4th Overall Internationale Juniorenrundfahrt

1st Young rider classification

8th Time trial, UEC European Junior Road Championships
2022
UCI Junior Road World Championships

1st Road race
3rd Time trial

National Junior Road Championships

1st Road race
2nd Time trial

1st Overall Grand Prix Rüebliland

1st Stage 1

1st Overall Course de la Paix Juniors
1st Overall Internationale Cottbuser Junioren-Etappenfahrt

1st Stage 1

1st Grand Prix West Bohemia
1st Giro di Primavera
3rd Time trial, UEC European Junior Road Championships
5th Paris–Roubaix Juniors
2023
7th G.P. Palio del Recioto
2024
7th Milano–Torino
2025
8th Overall Settimana Internazionale di Coppi e Bartali
2026
4th Bretagne Classic
7th Road race, UEC European Road Championships
