= 2025 Tour de Luxembourg =

2025 UCI ProSeries

Race details
- Dates: 17–21 September 2025
- Stages: 5
- Distance: 694.4 km (431.5 mi)
- Winning time: 16h 17' 34"

Results
Jersey awarded to the overall winner	Winner	Brandon McNulty (USA)	(UAE Team Emirates XRG)
	Second	Mattias Skjelmose (DEN)	(Lidl–Trek)
	Third	Richard Carapaz (ECU)	(EF Education–EasyPost)
Jersey awarded to the points classification winner	Points	Romain Grégoire (FRA)	(Groupama–FDJ)
Jersey awarded to the mountains classification winner	Mountains	Mil Morang (LUX)	(Luxembourg)
Jersey awarded to the young rider classification winner	Young rider	Mattias Skjelmose (DEN)	(Lidl–Trek)
	Team	(United Arab Emirates) UAE Team Emirates XRG	

The 2025 Tour de Luxembourg (officially Škoda Tour de Luxembourg 2025 for sponsorships reasons) was the 85th edition of the Tour de Luxembourg road cycling stage race, which is the part of the 2025 UCI ProSeries. It began on the 17th of September in Luxembourg and finished on the 21st of September also in Luxembourg.

== Teams ==
Eight UCI WorldTeams, seven UCI ProTeams, four UCI Continental teams and Luxembourg national team made up the twenty teams that participated in the race.

UCI WorldTeams

- Alpecin–Deceuninck
- Arkéa–B&B Hotels
- Decathlon–AG2R La Mondiale
- EF Education–EasyPost
- Groupama–FDJ
- Lidl–Trek
- Soudal–Quick-Step
- UAE Team Emirates XRG

UCI ProTeams

- Equipo Kern Pharma
- Team Flanders–Baloise
- Team Polti VisitMalta
- Team TotalEnergies
- Tudor Pro Cycling Team
- Uno-X Mobility
- Wagner Bazin WB

UCI Continental Teams

- Efapel Cycling
- Hrinkow Advarics
- Rembe / Rad-Net
- Team ColoQuick

National Teams

- Luxembourg

== Route ==
Stage characteristics and winners
Stage	Date	Course	Distance	Type	Stage winner
1	17 September	Luxembourg to Luxembourg	152.8 km (94.9 mi)	Hilly stage	Romain Grégoire (FRA)
2	18 September	Remich to Mamer	168.4 km (104.6 mi)	Hilly stage	Mathieu Kockelmann (LUX)
3	19 September	Mertert to Vianden	170.5 km (105.9 mi)	Hilly stage	Mattias Skjelmose (DEN)
4	20 September	Niederanven to Niederanven	26.3 km (16.3 mi)	Individual time trial	Ethan Hayter (GBR)
5	21 September	Mersch to Luxembourg	176.4 km (109.6 mi)	Hilly stage	Romain Grégoire (FRA)
Total			694.4 km (431.5 mi)		

== Stages ==
=== Stage 1 ===
17 September 2025 — Luxembourg to Luxembourg, 152.8 km (94.9 mi)

Stage 1 Result
Rank	Rider	Team	Time
1	Romain Grégoire (FRA)	Groupama–FDJ	3h 40' 45"
2	Marijn van den Berg (NED)	EF Education–EasyPost	+ 0"
3	Marc Hirschi (SUI)	Tudor Pro Cycling Team	+ 0"
4	Andrea Vendrame (ITA)	Decathlon–AG2R La Mondiale	+ 0"
5	Tibor Del Grosso (NED)	Alpecin–Deceuninck	+ 0"
6	Søren Kragh Andersen (DEN)	Lidl–Trek	+ 0"
7	Giacomo Ballabio (ITA)	Hrinkow Advarics	+ 0"
8	Jhonatan Narváez (ECU)	UAE Team Emirates XRG	+ 0"
9	Mathieu Burgaudeau (FRA)	Team TotalEnergies	+ 0"
10	Pepijn Reinderink (NED)	Soudal–Quick-Step	+ 0"

General classification after Stage 1
Rank	Rider	Team	Time
1	Romain Grégoire (FRA)	Groupama–FDJ	3h 40' 35"
2	Marijn van den Berg (NED)	EF Education–EasyPost	+ 4"
3	Marc Hirschi (SUI)	Tudor Pro Cycling Team	+ 6"
4	Andrea Vendrame (ITA)	Decathlon–AG2R La Mondiale	+ 10"
5	Tibor Del Grosso (NED)	Alpecin–Deceuninck	+ 10"
6	Søren Kragh Andersen (DEN)	Lidl–Trek	+ 10"
7	Giacomo Ballabio (ITA)	Hrinkow Advarics	+ 10"
8	Jhonatan Narváez (ECU)	UAE Team Emirates XRG	+ 10"
9	Mathieu Burgaudeau (FRA)	Team TotalEnergies	+ 10"
10	Pepijn Reinderink (NED)	Soudal–Quick-Step	+ 10"

=== Stage 2 ===
18 September 2025 — Remich to Mamer, 168.4 km (104.6 mi)

Stage 2 Result
Rank	Rider	Team	Time
1	Mathieu Kockelmann (LUX)	Luxembourg	3h 48' 47"
2	Andrea Vendrame (ITA)	Decathlon–AG2R La Mondiale	+ 0"
3	Tom Donnenwirth (FRA)	Groupama–FDJ	+ 0"
4	Tibor Del Grosso (NED)	EF Education–EasyPost	+ 0"
5	Marijn van den Berg (NED)	EF Education–EasyPost	+ 0"
6	Giacomo Villa (ITA)	Wagner Bazin WB	+ 0"
7	Carl-Frederik Bévort (DEN)	Uno-X Mobility	+ 0"
8	Søren Kragh Andersen (DEN)	Lidl–Trek	+ 0"
9	Pepijn Reinderink (NED)	Soudal–Quick-Step	+ 0"
10	Mathieu Burgaudeau (FRA)	Team TotalEnergies	+ 0"

General classification after Stage 2
Rank	Rider	Team	Time
1	Romain Grégoire (FRA)	Groupama–FDJ	7h 29' 22"
2	Andrea Vendrame (ITA)	Decathlon–AG2R La Mondiale	+ 4"
3	Marijn van den Berg (NED)	EF Education–EasyPost	+ 4"
4	Marc Hirschi (SUI)	Tudor Pro Cycling Team	+ 6"
5	Tibor Del Grosso (NED)	Alpecin–Deceuninck	+ 10"
6	Søren Kragh Andersen (DEN)	Lidl–Trek	+ 10"
7	Pepijn Reinderink (NED)	Soudal–Quick-Step	+ 10"
8	Mathieu Burgaudeau (FRA)	Team TotalEnergies	+ 10"
9	Carl-Frederik Bévort (DEN)	Uno-X Mobility	+ 10"
10	Mats Wenzel (LUX)	Equipo Kern Pharma	+ 10"

=== Stage 3 ===
19 September 2025 — Mertert to Vianden, 170.5 km (105.9 mi)

Stage 3 Result
Rank	Rider	Team	Time
1	Mattias Skjelmose (DEN)	Lidl–Trek	4h 05' 07"
2	Jordan Jegat (FRA)	Team TotalEnergies	+ 0"
3	Brandon McNulty (USA)	UAE Team Emirates XRG	+ 2"
4	Jhonatan Narváez (ECU)	UAE Team Emirates XRG	+ 2"
5	Marco Brenner (GER)	Tudor Pro Cycling Team	+ 2"
6	Marc Hirschi (SUI)	Tudor Pro Cycling Team	+ 6"
7	Nicolas Prodhomme (FRA)	Decathlon–AG2R La Mondiale	+ 10"
8	Toms Skujiņš (LAT)	Lidl–Trek	+ 10"
9	Richard Carapaz (ECU)	EF Education–EasyPost	+ 10"
10	Mathys Rondel (FRA)	Tudor Pro Cycling Team	+ 13"

General classification after Stage 3
Rank	Rider	Team	Time
1	Mattias Skjelmose (DEN)	Lidl–Trek	11h 34' 29"
2	Jordan Jegat (FRA)	Team TotalEnergies	+ 4"
3	Brandon McNulty (USA)	UAE Team Emirates XRG	+ 8"
4	Marc Hirschi (SUI)	Tudor Pro Cycling Team	+ 12"
5	Marco Brenner (GER)	Tudor Pro Cycling Team	+ 12"
6	Jhonatan Narváez (ECU)	UAE Team Emirates XRG	+ 12"
7	Richard Carapaz (ECU)	EF Education–EasyPost	+ 20"
8	Nicolas Prodhomme (FRA)	Decathlon–AG2R La Mondiale	+ 20"
9	Toms Skujiņš (LAT)	Lidl–Trek	+ 20"
10	Mathys Rondel (FRA)	Tudor Pro Cycling Team	+ 23"

=== Stage 4 ===
20 September 2025 — Niederanven to Niederanven, 26.3 km (16.3 mi) (ITT)

Stage 4 Result
Rank	Rider	Team	Time
1	Ethan Hayter (GBR)	Soudal–Quick-Step	30' 38"
2	Brandon McNulty (USA)	UAE Team Emirates XRG	+ 28"
3	Ben Healy (IRL)	EF Education–EasyPost	+ 58"
4	Thibault Guernalec (FRA)	Arkéa–B&B Hotels	+ 1' 01"
5	Oscar Chamberlain (AUS)	Decathlon–AG2R La Mondiale	+ 1' 02"
6	Aurélien Paret-Peintre (FRA)	Decathlon–AG2R La Mondiale	+ 1' 10"
7	Nils Politt (GER)	UAE Team Emirates XRG	+ 1' 16"
8	Richard Carapaz (ECU)	EF Education–EasyPost	+ 1' 20"
9	Thomas Gachignard (FRA)	Team TotalEnergies	+ 1' 22"
10	Mattias Skjelmose (DEN)	Lidl–Trek	+ 1' 23"

General classification after Stage 4
Rank	Rider	Team	Time
1	Brandon McNulty (USA)	UAE Team Emirates XRG	12h 05' 43"
2	Mattias Skjelmose (DEN)	Lidl–Trek	+ 47"
3	Richard Carapaz (ECU)	EF Education–EasyPost	+ 1' 04"
4	Mathys Rondel (FRA)	Tudor Pro Cycling Team	+ 1' 12"
5	Toms Skujiņš (LAT)	Lidl–Trek	+ 1' 19"
6	Marc Hirschi (SUI)	Tudor Pro Cycling Team	+ 1' 19"
7	Marco Brenner (GER)	Tudor Pro Cycling Team	+ 1' 35"
8	Aurélien Paret-Peintre (FRA)	Decathlon–AG2R La Mondiale	+ 1' 35"
9	Jhonatan Narváez (ECU)	UAE Team Emirates XRG	+ 1' 37"
10	Urko Berrade (ESP)	Equipo Kern Pharma	+ 1' 40"

=== Stage 5 ===
21 September 2025 — Mersch to Luxembourg, 176.4 km (109.6 mi)

Stage 5 Result
Rank	Rider	Team	Time
1	Romain Grégoire (FRA)	Groupama–FDJ	4h 10' 56"
2	Ben Healy (IRL)	EF Education–EasyPost	+ 1"
3	Senna Remijn (NED)	Alpecin–Deceuninck	+ 55"
4	Brandon McNulty (USA)	UAE Team Emirates XRG	+ 55"
5	Richard Carapaz (ECU)	EF Education–EasyPost	+ 55"
6	Aurélien Paret-Peintre (FRA)	Decathlon–AG2R La Mondiale	+ 55"
7	Marc Hirschi (SUI)	Tudor Pro Cycling Team	+ 55"
8	Mattias Skjelmose (DEN)	Lidl–Trek	+ 55"
9	Mathys Rondel (FRA)	Tudor Pro Cycling Team	+ 57"
10	Johannes Adamietz (GER)	Rembe / Rad-Net	+ 59"

General classification after Stage 5
Rank	Rider	Team	Time
1	Brandon McNulty (USA)	UAE Team Emirates XRG	16h 17' 34"
2	Mattias Skjelmose (DEN)	Lidl–Trek	+ 47"
3	Richard Carapaz (ECU)	EF Education–EasyPost	+ 1' 04"
4	Mathys Rondel (FRA)	Tudor Pro Cycling Team	+ 1' 14"
5	Marc Hirschi (SUI)	Tudor Pro Cycling Team	+ 1' 19"
6	Ben Healy (IRL)	EF Education–EasyPost	+ 1' 20"
7	Toms Skujiņš (LAT)	Lidl–Trek	+ 1' 30"
8	Aurélien Paret-Peintre (FRA)	Decathlon–AG2R La Mondiale	+ 1' 35"
9	Jhonatan Narváez (ECU)	UAE Team Emirates XRG	+ 1' 37"
10	Urko Berrade (ESP)	Equipo Kern Pharma	+ 1' 48"

== Classification leadership table ==
Classification leadership by stage
Stage	Winner	General classification	Points classification	Mountains classification	Young rider classification	Team classification
1	Romain Grégoire	Romain Grégoire	Romain Grégoire	Malte Hellerup	Romain Grégoire	EF Education–EasyPost
2	Mathieu Kockelmann	Romain Grégoire	Andrea Vendrame	Mil Morang	Romain Grégoire	EF Education–EasyPost
3	Mattias Skjelmose	Mattias Skjelmose	Andrea Vendrame	Mil Morang	Mattias Skjelmose	Tudor Pro Cycling Team
4	Ethan Hayter	Brandon McNulty	Brandon McNulty	Mil Morang	Mattias Skjelmose	UAE Team Emirates XRG
5	Romain Grégoire	Brandon McNulty	Romain Grégoire	Mil Morang	Mattias Skjelmose	UAE Team Emirates XRG
Final		Brandon McNulty	Romain Grégoire	Mil Morang	Mattias Skjelmose	UAE Team Emirates XRG

== Classification standings ==
Legend
Denotes the winner of the general classification	Denotes the winner of the young rider classification
Denotes the winner of the points classification	Denotes the winner of the mountains classification

=== General classification ===
Final general classification (1–10)
Rank	Rider	Team	Time
1	Brandon McNulty (USA)	UAE Team Emirates XRG	16h 17' 34"
2	Mattias Skjelmose (DEN)	Lidl–Trek	+ 47"
3	Richard Carapaz (ECU)	EF Education–EasyPost	+ 1' 04"
4	Mathys Rondel (FRA)	Tudor Pro Cycling Team	+ 1' 14"
5	Marc Hirschi (SUI)	Tudor Pro Cycling Team	+ 1' 19"
6	Ben Healy (IRL)	EF Education–EasyPost	+ 1' 20"
7	Toms Skujiņš (LAT)	Lidl–Trek	+ 1' 30"
8	Aurélien Paret-Peintre (FRA)	Decathlon–AG2R La Mondiale	+ 1' 35"
9	Jhonatan Narváez (ECU)	UAE Team Emirates XRG	+ 1' 37"
10	Urko Berrade (ESP)	Equipo Kern Pharma	+ 1' 48"

=== Points classification ===
Final points classification (1–10)
Rank	Rider	Team	Points
1	Romain Grégoire (FRA)	Groupama–FDJ	43
2	Brandon McNulty (USA)	UAE Team Emirates XRG	40
3	Ben Healy (IRL)	EF Education–EasyPost	35
4	Andrea Vendrame (ITA)	Decathlon–AG2R La Mondiale	27
5	Marc Hirschi (SUI)	Tudor Pro Cycling Team	25
6	Marijn van den Berg (NED)	EF Education–EasyPost	25
7	Mattias Skjelmose (DEN)	Lidl–Trek	24
8	Ethan Hayter (GBR)	Soudal–Quick-Step	20
9	Mathieu Kockelmann (LUX)	Luxembourg	20
10	Tibor Del Grosso (NED)	Alpecin–Deceuninck	20

=== Mountains classification ===
Final mountains classification (1–10)
Rank	Rider	Team	Points
1	Mil Morang (LUX)	Luxembourg	22
2	Malte Hellerup (DEN)	Team ColoQuick	21
3	Henri-François Renard-Haquin (FRA)	Wagner Bazin WB	12
4	Ådne Holter (NOR)	Uno-X Mobility	12
5	Diego Uriarte (ESP)	Equipo Kern Pharma	10
6	Joshua Gudnitz (DEN)	Team ColoQuick	10
7	Casper Pedersen (DEN)	Soudal–Quick-Step	9
8	Loic Bettendorff (LUX)	Hrinkow Advarics	7
9	Thomas Gachignard (FRA)	Team TotalEnergies	6
10	Quentin Bezza (FRA)	Wagner Bazin WB	6

=== Young rider classification ===
Final young rider classification (1–10)
Rank	Rider	Team	Time
1	Mattias Skjelmose (DEN)	Lidl–Trek	16h 18' 21"
2	Mathys Rondel (FRA)	Tudor Pro Cycling Team	+ 27"
3	Ben Healy (IRL)	EF Education–EasyPost	+ 33"
4	Johannes Kulset (NOR)	Uno-X Mobility	+ 1' 56"
5	Pepijn Reinderink (NED)	Soudal–Quick-Step	+ 2' 03"
6	Milan Lanhove (BEL)	Team Flanders–Baloise	+ 2' 21"
7	Arno Wallenborn (LUX)	Luxembourg	+ 2' 33"
8	Romain Grégoire (FRA)	Groupama–FDJ	+ 2' 47"
9	Mats Wenzel (LUX)	Equipo Kern Pharma	+ 3' 53"
10	Thomas Gachignard (FRA)	Team TotalEnergies	+ 4' 27"

=== Team classification ===
Final team classification (1–10)
Rank	Team	Time
1	(United Arab Emirates) UAE Team Emirates XRG	48h 56' 20"
2	(France) Decathlon–AG2R La Mondiale	+ 2' 50"
3	(Switzerland) Tudor Pro Cycling Team	+ 7' 16"
4	(United States) Lidl–Trek	+ 8' 09"
5	(Spain) Equipo Kern Pharma	+ 13' 28"
6	(Belgium) Soudal–Quick-Step	+ 13' 50"
7	(France) Team TotalEnergies	+ 17' 03"
8	(United States) EF Education–EasyPost	+ 21' 33"
9	(France) Groupama–FDJ	+ 23' 34"
10	(Norway) Uno-X Mobility	+ 25' 46"
