= 2026 Tour de Luxembourg =

2026 UCI ProSeries

Race details
- Dates: 16–20 September 2026
- Stages: 5
- Distance: 701.3 km (435.8 mi)
- Winning time: 16h 22' 17"

Results
Jersey awarded to the overall winner	Winner	Davide Piganzoli (ITA)	(Visma–Lease a Bike)
	Second	Mattéo Vercher (FRA)	(Team TotalEnergies)
	Third	Thomas Gachignard (FRA)	(Team TotalEnergies)
Jersey awarded to the points classification winner	Points	Mathieu van der Poel (NED)	(Alpecin–Premier Tech)
Jersey awarded to the mountains classification winner	Mountains	Mathieu van der Poel (NED)	(Alpecin–Premier Tech)
Jersey awarded to the young rider classification winner	Young rider	Davide Piganzoli (ITA)	(Visma–Lease a Bike)
	Team	(France) Team TotalEnergies	

The 2026 Tour de Luxembourg (officially Škoda Tour de Luxembourg 2026 for sponsorships reasons) was the 86th edition of the Tour de Luxembourg road cycling stage race, which is the part of the 2026 UCI ProSeries. It began on the 16th of September in Luxembourg and finished on the 20th of September also in Luxembourg.

== Teams ==
Seven UCI WorldTeams, three UCI ProTeams, six UCI Continental teams and Luxembourg national team made up the seventeen teams that participated in the race.

UCI WorldTeams

- Alpecin–Premier Tech
- Decathlon CMA CGM
- EF Education–EasyPost
- Lidl–Trek
- Soudal–Quick-Step
- UAE Team Emirates XRG
- Visma–Lease a Bike

UCI ProTeams

- Modern Adventure Pro Cycling
- Team Flanders–Baloise
- Team TotalEnergies

UCI Continental Teams

- CIC Pro Cycling Academy
- Feira dos Sofás–Boavista
- Metec–Solarwatt p/b Mantel
- Rembe / Rad-Net
- Team ColoQuick
- Team Lotto–Kern Haus Outlet Montabaur

National Teams

- Luxembourg

== Route ==
Stage characteristics and winners
Stage	Date	Course	Distance	Type	Stage winner
1	16 September	Luxembourg-Knuedler to Luxembourg-Fëschmaart	157.5 km (97.9 mi)	Hilly stage	Mathieu van der Poel (NED)
2	17 September	Niederkorn to Junglinster	166.8 km (103.6 mi)	Hilly stage	Marijn van den Berg (NED)
3	18 September	Wiltz to Diekirch	179.6 km (111.6 mi)	Hilly stage	Pepijn Reinderink (NED)
4	19 September	Ettelbruck to Ettelbruck	20.4 km (12.7 mi)	Individual time trial	Davide Piganzoli (ITA)
5	20 September	Mersch to Luxembourg-Limpertsberg	176.4 km (109.6 mi)	Hilly stage	Mathieu van der Poel (NED)
Total			701.3 km (435.8 mi)		

== Stages ==
=== Stage 1 ===
16 September 2026 — Luxembourg-Knuedler to Luxembourg-Fëschmaart, 157.5 km (97.9 mi)

Stage 1 Result
Rank	Rider	Team	Time
1	Mathieu van der Poel (NED)	Alpecin–Premier Tech	3h 45' 42"
2	Pierre Gautherat (FRA)	Decathlon CMA CGM	+ 0"
3	Marijn van den Berg (NED)	EF Education–EasyPost	+ 0"
4	Per Strand Hagenes (NOR)	Visma–Lease a Bike	+ 2"
5	Jasper Stuyven (BEL)	Soudal–Quick-Step	+ 2"
6	Axel Mariault (FRA)	CIC Pro Cycling Academy	+ 2"
7	Andrea Raccagni Noviero (ITA)	Soudal–Quick-Step	+ 2"
8	Mattéo Vercher (FRA)	Team TotalEnergies	+ 2"
9	Nicolas Breuillard (FRA)	Team TotalEnergies	+ 2"
10	Davide Piganzoli (ITA)	Visma–Lease a Bike	+ 2"

General classification after Stage 1
Rank	Rider	Team	Time
1	Mathieu van der Poel (NED)	Alpecin–Premier Tech	3h 45' 32"
2	Pierre Gautherat (FRA)	Decathlon CMA CGM	+ 4"
3	Marijn van den Berg (NED)	EF Education–EasyPost	+ 6"
4	Per Strand Hagenes (NOR)	Visma–Lease a Bike	+ 12"
5	Jasper Stuyven (BEL)	Soudal–Quick-Step	+ 12"
6	Axel Mariault (FRA)	CIC Pro Cycling Academy	+ 12"
7	Andrea Raccagni Noviero (ITA)	Soudal–Quick-Step	+ 12"
8	Mattéo Vercher (FRA)	Team TotalEnergies	+ 12"
9	Nicolas Breuillard (FRA)	Team TotalEnergies	+ 12"
10	Davide Piganzoli (ITA)	Visma–Lease a Bike	+ 12"

=== Stage 2 ===
17 September 2026 — Niederkorn to Junglinster, 166.8 km (103.6 mi)

Stage 2 Result
Rank	Rider	Team	Time
1	Marijn van den Berg (NED)	EF Education–EasyPost	3h 50' 12"
2	Timo Kielich (BEL)	Visma–Lease a Bike	+ 0"
3	Pierre Gautherat (FRA)	Decathlon CMA CGM	+ 0"
4	Jasper Stuyven (BEL)	Soudal–Quick-Step	+ 0"
5	Mathieu van der Poel (NED)	Alpecin–Premier Tech	+ 0"
6	Andrea Bagioli (ITA)	Lidl–Trek	+ 0"
7	Elias Maris (BEL)	Team Flanders–Baloise	+ 0"
8	Eike Behrens (GER)	Team Lotto–Kern Haus Outlet Montabaur	+ 0"
9	Léandre Lozouet (FRA)	CIC Pro Cycling Academy	+ 0"
10	Mathieu Kockelmann (LUX)	Luxembourg	+ 0"

General classification after Stage 2
Rank	Rider	Team	Time
1	Marijn van den Berg (NED)	EF Education–EasyPost	7h 35' 40"
2	Pierre Gautherat (FRA)	Decathlon CMA CGM	+ 4"
3	Mathieu van der Poel (NED)	Alpecin–Premier Tech	+ 4"
4	Jasper Stuyven (BEL)	Soudal–Quick-Step	+ 16"
5	Davide Piganzoli (ITA)	Visma–Lease a Bike	+ 16"
6	Nicolas Breuillard (FRA)	Team TotalEnergies	+ 16"
7	Axel Mariault (FRA)	CIC Pro Cycling Academy	+ 16"
8	Mattéo Vercher (FRA)	Team TotalEnergies	+ 16"
9	Andrea Raccagni Noviero (ITA)	Soudal–Quick-Step	+ 16"
10	Per Strand Hagenes (NOR)	Visma–Lease a Bike	+ 16"

=== Stage 3 ===
18 September 2026 — Wiltz to Diekirch, 179.6 km (111.6 mi)

Stage 3 Result
Rank	Rider	Team	Time
1	Pepijn Reinderink (NED)	Soudal–Quick-Step	4h 07' 30"
2	Davide Piganzoli (ITA)	Visma–Lease a Bike	+ 1"
3	Thomas Gachignard (FRA)	Team TotalEnergies	+ 1"
4	Mattéo Vercher (FRA)	Team TotalEnergies	+ 4"
5	Igor Arrieta (ESP)	UAE Team Emirates XRG	+ 11"
6	Sam Oomen (NED)	Lidl–Trek	+ 17"
7	Eike Behrens (GER)	Team Lotto–Kern Haus Outlet Montabaur	+ 23"
8	Aurélien Paret-Peintre (FRA)	Decathlon CMA CGM	+ 23"
9	Tijmen Graat (NED)	Visma–Lease a Bike	+ 38"
10	Lukas Nerurkar (GBR)	EF Education–EasyPost	+ 38"

General classification after Stage 3
Rank	Rider	Team	Time
1	Davide Piganzoli (ITA)	Visma–Lease a Bike	11h 43' 21"
2	Thomas Gachignard (FRA)	Team TotalEnergies	+ 6"
3	Mattéo Vercher (FRA)	Team TotalEnergies	+ 9"
4	Igor Arrieta (ESP)	UAE Team Emirates XRG	+ 18"
5	Aurélien Paret-Peintre (FRA)	Decathlon CMA CGM	+ 32"
6	Sam Oomen (NED)	Lidl–Trek	+ 46"
7	Tijmen Graat (NED)	Visma–Lease a Bike	+ 47"
8	Eike Behrens (GER)	Team Lotto–Kern Haus Outlet Montabaur	+ 58"
9	Pepijn Reinderink (NED)	Soudal–Quick-Step	+ 1' 17"
10	Lukas Nerurkar (GBR)	EF Education–EasyPost	+ 1' 44"

=== Stage 4 ===
19 September 2026 — Ettelbruck to Ettelbruck, 20.4 km (12.7 mi) (ITT)

Stage 4 Result
Rank	Rider	Team	Time
1	Davide Piganzoli (ITA)	Visma–Lease a Bike	26' 49"
2	Andrea Raccagni Noviero (ITA)	Soudal–Quick-Step	+ 3"
3	Leo Hayter (GBR)	Modern Adventure Pro Cycling	+ 19"
4	Julius Johansen (DEN)	UAE Team Emirates XRG	+ 19"
5	Søren Kragh Andersen (DEN)	Lidl–Trek	+ 20"
6	Aurélien Paret-Peintre (FRA)	Decathlon CMA CGM	+ 22"
7	Emiel Verstrynge (BEL)	Alpecin–Premier Tech	+ 25"
8	Dylan van Baarle (NED)	Soudal–Quick-Step	+ 25"
9	Miguel Heidemann (GER)	Rembe / Rad-Net	+ 26"
10	Thibault Guernalec (FRA)	Team TotalEnergies	+ 31"

General classification after Stage 4
Rank	Rider	Team	Time
1	Davide Piganzoli (ITA)	Visma–Lease a Bike	12h 10' 10"
2	Mattéo Vercher (FRA)	Team TotalEnergies	+ 47"
3	Thomas Gachignard (FRA)	Team TotalEnergies	+ 49"
4	Aurélien Paret-Peintre (FRA)	Decathlon CMA CGM	+ 54"
5	Igor Arrieta (ESP)	UAE Team Emirates XRG	+ 1' 16"
6	Tijmen Graat (NED)	Visma–Lease a Bike	+ 1' 57"
7	Sam Oomen (NED)	Lidl–Trek	+ 2' 03"
8	Eike Behrens (GER)	Team Lotto–Kern Haus Outlet Montabaur	+ 2' 03"
9	Søren Kragh Andersen (DEN)	Lidl–Trek	+ 2' 12"
10	Pepijn Reinderink (NED)	Soudal–Quick-Step	+ 2' 30"

=== Stage 5 ===
20 September 2026 — Mersch to Luxembourg-Limpertsberg, 177 km (110 mi)

Stage 5 Result
Rank	Rider	Team	Time
1	Mathieu van der Poel (NED)	Alpecin–Premier Tech	4h 10' 58"
2	Mikkel Frølich Honoré (DEN)	EF Education–EasyPost	+ 1' 04"
3	Pepijn Reinderink (NED)	Soudal–Quick-Step	+ 1' 09"
4	Davide Piganzoli (ITA)	Visma–Lease a Bike	+ 1' 09"
5	Lukas Nerurkar (GBR)	EF Education–EasyPost	+ 1' 09"
6	Mattéo Vercher (FRA)	Team TotalEnergies	+ 1' 14"
7	Søren Kragh Andersen (DEN)	Lidl–Trek	+ 1' 14"
8	Thomas Gachignard (FRA)	Team TotalEnergies	+ 1' 14"
9	Antoine L'Hote (FRA)	Decathlon CMA CGM	+ 1' 18"
10	Aurélien Paret-Peintre (FRA)	Decathlon CMA CGM	+ 1' 18"

General classification after Stage 5
Rank	Rider	Team	Time
1	Davide Piganzoli (ITA)	Visma–Lease a Bike	16h 22' 17"
2	Mattéo Vercher (FRA)	Team TotalEnergies	+ 52"
3	Thomas Gachignard (FRA)	Team TotalEnergies	+ 54"
4	Aurélien Paret-Peintre (FRA)	Decathlon CMA CGM	+ 1' 03"
5	Igor Arrieta (ESP)	UAE Team Emirates XRG	+ 1' 25"
6	Tijmen Graat (NED)	Visma–Lease a Bike	+ 2' 10"
7	Søren Kragh Andersen (DEN)	Lidl–Trek	+ 2' 16"
8	Sam Oomen (NED)	Lidl–Trek	+ 2' 16"
9	Pepijn Reinderink (NED)	Soudal–Quick-Step	+ 2' 24"
10	Eike Behrens (GER)	Team Lotto–Kern Haus Outlet Montabaur	+ 2' 33"

== Classification leadership table ==
Classification leadership by stage
Stage	Winner	General classification	Points classification	Mountains classification	Young rider classification	Team classification
1	Mathieu van der Poel	Mathieu van der Poel	Mathieu van der Poel	Malte Hellerup	Pierre Gautherat	Visma–Lease a Bike
2	Marijn van den Berg	Marijn van den Berg	Marijn van den Berg	Conrad Haugsted	Pierre Gautherat	Visma–Lease a Bike
3	Pepijn Reinderink	Davide Piganzoli	Marijn van den Berg	Pepijn Reinderink	Davide Piganzoli	Team TotalEnergies
4	Davide Piganzoli	Davide Piganzoli	Davide Piganzoli	Pepijn Reinderink	Davide Piganzoli	Team TotalEnergies
5	Mathieu van der Poel	Davide Piganzoli	Mathieu van der Poel	Mathieu van der Poel	Davide Piganzoli	Team TotalEnergies
Final		Davide Piganzoli	Mathieu van der Poel	Mathieu van der Poel	Davide Piganzoli	Team TotalEnergies

== Classification standings ==
Legend
Denotes the winner of the general classification	Denotes the winner of the young rider classification
Denotes the winner of the points classification	Denotes the winner of the mountains classification

=== General classification ===
Final general classification (1–10)
Rank	Rider	Team	Time
1	Davide Piganzoli (ITA)	Visma–Lease a Bike	16h 22' 17"
2	Mattéo Vercher (FRA)	Team TotalEnergies	+ 52"
3	Thomas Gachignard (FRA)	Team TotalEnergies	+ 54"
4	Aurélien Paret-Peintre (FRA)	Decathlon CMA CGM	+ 1' 03"
5	Igor Arrieta (ESP)	UAE Team Emirates XRG	+ 1' 25"
6	Tijmen Graat (NED)	Visma–Lease a Bike	+ 2' 10"
7	Søren Kragh Andersen (DEN)	Lidl–Trek	+ 2' 16"
8	Sam Oomen (NED)	Lidl–Trek	+ 2' 16"
9	Pepijn Reinderink (NED)	Soudal–Quick-Step	+ 2' 24"
10	Eike Behrens (GER)	Team Lotto–Kern Haus Outlet Montabaur	+ 2' 33"

=== Points classification ===
Final points classification (1–10)
Rank	Rider	Team	Points
1	Mathieu van der Poel (NED)	Alpecin–Premier Tech	54
2	Davide Piganzoli (ITA)	Visma–Lease a Bike	48
3	Marijn van den Berg (NED)	EF Education–EasyPost	36
4	Pepijn Reinderink (NED)	Soudal–Quick-Step	33
5	Pierre Gautherat (FRA)	Decathlon CMA CGM	29
6	Mattéo Vercher (FRA)	Team TotalEnergies	21
7	Andrea Raccagni Noviero (ITA)	Soudal–Quick-Step	21
8	Jasper Stuyven (BEL)	Soudal–Quick-Step	20
9	Thomas Gachignard (FRA)	Team TotalEnergies	16
10	Søren Kragh Andersen (DEN)	Lidl–Trek	16

=== Mountains classification ===
Final mountains classification (1–10)
Rank	Rider	Team	Points
1	Mathieu van der Poel (NED)	Alpecin–Premier Tech	28
2	Pepijn Reinderink (NED)	Soudal–Quick-Step	21
3	Nils Politt (GER)	UAE Team Emirates XRG	15
4	Malte Hellerup (DEN)	Team ColoQuick	15
5	Conrad Haugsted (DEN)	Team ColoQuick	13
6	Jonathan Malte Rottmann (GER)	Team Lotto–Kern Haus Outlet Montabaur	7
7	Eike Behrens (GER)	Team Lotto–Kern Haus Outlet Montabaur	7
8	Maël Guégan (FRA)	CIC Pro Cycling Academy	7
9	Davide Piganzoli (ITA)	Visma–Lease a Bike	5
10	Timo Kielich (BEL)	Visma–Lease a Bike	5

=== Young rider classification ===
Final young rider classification (1–10)
Rank	Rider	Team	Time
1	Davide Piganzoli (ITA)	Visma–Lease a Bike	16h 22' 17"
2	Mattéo Vercher (FRA)	Team TotalEnergies	+ 52"
3	Igor Arrieta (ESP)	UAE Team Emirates XRG	+ 1' 25"
4	Tijmen Graat (NED)	Visma–Lease a Bike	+ 2' 10"
5	Pepijn Reinderink (NED)	Soudal–Quick-Step	+ 2' 24"
6	Eike Behrens (GER)	Team Lotto–Kern Haus Outlet Montabaur	+ 2' 33"
7	Lukas Nerurkar (GBR)	EF Education–EasyPost	+ 3' 23"
8	Senne Thonnon (BEL)	Team Flanders–Baloise	+ 6' 09"
9	Pierre Thierry (FRA)	Team TotalEnergies	+ 6' 46"
10	Maxime Vezie (FRA)	CIC Pro Cycling Academy	+ 6' 47"

=== Team classification ===
Final team classification (1–10)
Rank	Team	Time
1	(France) Team TotalEnergies	49h 13' 27"
2	(Netherlands) Visma–Lease a Bike	+ 46"
3	(Belgium) Soudal–Quick-Step	+ 2' 45"
4	(France) Decathlon CMA CGM	+ 6' 49"
5	(Germany) Lidl–Trek	+ 10' 20"
6	(United Arab Emirates) UAE Team Emirates XRG	+ 12' 18"
7	(United States) EF Education–EasyPost	+ 14' 36"
8	(Germany) Team Lotto–Kern Haus Outlet Montabaur	+ 18' 43"
9	(Belgium) Team Flanders–Baloise	+ 19' 01"
10	(Belgium) Alpecin–Premier Tech	+ 19' 24"
