= 2019 Tour de Luxembourg =

2019 UCI Europe Tour

Race details
- Dates: 5 – 9 June 2019
- Stages: 5
- Distance: 716.7 km (445.3 mi)
- Winning time: 17h 41' 49"

Results
Jersey awarded to the overall winner	Winner	Jesús Herrada (ESP)	(Cofidis)
	Second	Maurits Lammertink (NED)	(Roompot–Charles)
	Third	Andrea Pasqualon (ITA)	(Wanty–Gobert)
Jersey awarded to the points classification winner	Points	Jesús Herrada (ESP)	(Cofidis)
Jersey awarded to the mountains classification winner	Mountains	Robin Carpenter (USA)	(Rally UHC Cycling)
Jersey awarded to the youth classification winner	Youth	Anthony Turgis (FRA)	(Total Direct Énergie)
	Team	Roompot–Charles	

The 2019 Tour de Luxembourg was the 79th edition of the Tour de Luxembourg road cycling stage race. It was held between 5 and 9 June, as a 2.HC event as part of the 2019 UCI Europe Tour.

== Schedule ==
Stage characteristics and winners
Stage	Date	Route	Distance	Type	Winner
P	5 June	Luxembourg City to Luxembourg City	2.1 km (1.3 mi)	Individual time trial	Christophe Laporte (FRA)
1	6 June	Luxembourg City to Bascharage	191.3 km (118.9 mi)	Flat stage	Christophe Laporte (FRA)
2	7 June	Steinfort to Rosport	168.6 km (104.8 mi)	Flat stage	Pieter Weening (NED)
3	8 June	Mondorf to Diekirch	178.7 km (111.0 mi)	Hilly stage	Jesús Herrada (ESP)
4	9 June	Mersch to Luxembourg City	176 km (109 mi)	Hilly stage	Jesús Herrada (ESP)
Total		716.7 km (445.3 mi)			

== Teams ==
Thirteen UCI Professional Continental teams, three UCI Continental teams, and the Luxembourg national team made up the seventeen teams that participated the race. Each team entered seven riders, except for Bardiani–CSF, W52 / FC Porto, and the Luxembourg national team, which each entered six, for a starting peloton of 116 riders. Of these riders, only 90 finished the race.

UCI Professional Continental Teams

- Bardiani–CSF
- Cofidis
- Corendon–Circus
- Delko–Marseille Provence
- Euskadi–Murias
- Rally UHC Cycling
- Riwal Readynez
- Roompot–Charles
- Sport Vlaanderen–Baloise
- Total Direct Énergie
- W52 / FC Porto
- Wallonie Bruxelles
- Wanty–Gobert

UCI Continental Teams

- Leopard Pro Cycling
- Team Differdange–Geba
- Team Lotto–Kern Haus

National Teams

- Luxembourg

== Stages ==
=== Prologue ===
5 June 2019 — Luxembourg City to Luxembourg City, 2.1 km (1.3 mi) (ITT)

Prologue Result
Rank	Rider	Team	Time
1	Christophe Laporte (FRA)	Cofidis	3' 13"
2	Marcel Meisen (GER)	Corendon–Circus	+ 1"
3	Piet Allegaert (BEL)	Sport Vlaanderen–Baloise	+ 1"
4	Damien Gaudin (FRA)	Total Direct Énergie	+ 3"
5	Aimé De Gendt (BEL)	Wanty–Gobert	+ 3"
6	Alexander Krieger (GER)	Leopard Pro Cycling	+ 3"
7	Jonathan Hivert (FRA)	Total Direct Énergie	+ 5"
8	Kevin Geniets (LUX)	Luxembourg	+ 6"
9	Anthony Perez (FRA)	Cofidis	+ 6"
10	Benjamin Declercq (BEL)	Sport Vlaanderen–Baloise	+ 6"

General classification after Prologue
Rank	Rider	Team	Time
1	Christophe Laporte (FRA)	Cofidis	3' 13"
2	Marcel Meisen (GER)	Corendon–Circus	+ 1"
3	Piet Allegaert (BEL)	Sport Vlaanderen–Baloise	+ 1"
4	Damien Gaudin (FRA)	Total Direct Énergie	+ 3"
5	Aimé De Gendt (BEL)	Wanty–Gobert	+ 3"
6	Alexander Krieger (GER)	Leopard Pro Cycling	+ 3"
7	Jonathan Hivert (FRA)	Total Direct Énergie	+ 5"
8	Kevin Geniets (LUX)	Luxembourg	+ 6"
9	Anthony Perez (FRA)	Cofidis	+ 6"
10	Benjamin Declercq (BEL)	Sport Vlaanderen–Baloise	+ 6"

=== Stage 1 ===
6 June 2019 — Luxembourg City to Bascharage, 191.3 km (118.9 mi)

Stage 1 Result
Rank	Rider	Team	Time
1	Christophe Laporte (FRA)	Cofidis	4h 48' 31"
2	Justin Jules (FRA)	Wallonie Bruxelles	+ 0"
3	Eduard-Michael Grosu (ROU)	Delko–Marseille Provence	+ 0"
4	Adrien Petit (FRA)	Total Direct Énergie	+ 0"
5	Kenneth Van Rooy (BEL)	Sport Vlaanderen–Baloise	+ 0"
6	Sjoerd van Ginneken (NED)	Roompot–Charles	+ 0"
7	Loïc Vliegen (BEL)	Wanty–Gobert	+ 0"
8	Aksel Nõmmela (EST)	Wallonie Bruxelles	+ 0"
9	Andrea Pasqualon (ITA)	Wanty–Gobert	+ 0"
10	Edward Planckaert (BEL)	Sport Vlaanderen–Baloise	+ 0"

General classification after Stage 1
Rank	Rider	Team	Time
1	Christophe Laporte (FRA)	Cofidis	4h 51' 34"
2	Marcel Meisen (GER)	Corendon–Circus	+ 11"
3	Piet Allegaert (BEL)	Sport Vlaanderen–Baloise	+ 11"
4	Aimé De Gendt (BEL)	Wanty–Gobert	+ 13"
5	Alexander Krieger (GER)	Leopard Pro Cycling	+ 13"
6	Anthony Perez (FRA)	Cofidis	+ 15"
7	Jonathan Hivert (FRA)	Total Direct Énergie	+ 15"
8	Kevin Geniets (LUX)	Luxembourg	+ 16"
9	Benjamin Declercq (BEL)	Sport Vlaanderen–Baloise	+ 16"
10	Jesús Herrada (ESP)	Cofidis	+ 17"

=== Stage 2 ===
7 June 2019 — Steinfort to Rosport, 168.6 km (104.8 mi)

Stage 2 Result
Rank	Rider	Team	Time
1	Pieter Weening (NED)	Roompot–Charles	4h 00' 23"
2	Eduard-Michael Grosu (ROU)	Delko–Marseille Provence	+ 2"
3	Andrea Pasqualon (ITA)	Wanty–Gobert	+ 2"
4	Baptiste Planckaert (BEL)	Wallonie Bruxelles	+ 2"
5	Vincenzo Albanese (ITA)	Bardiani–CSF	+ 2"
6	Nicolai Brøchner (DEN)	Riwal Readynez	+ 2"
7	Alexander Krieger (GER)	Leopard Pro Cycling	+ 2"
8	Joaquim Silva (POR)	W52 / FC Porto	+ 2"
9	Christophe Laporte (FRA)	Cofidis	+ 2"
10	Pit Leyder (LUX)	Leopard Pro Cycling	+ 2"

General classification after Stage 2
Rank	Rider	Team	Time
1	Christophe Laporte (FRA)	Cofidis	8h 51' 59"
2	Marcel Meisen (GER)	Corendon–Circus	+ 10"
3	Aimé De Gendt (BEL)	Wanty–Gobert	+ 10"
4	Piet Allegaert (BEL)	Sport Vlaanderen–Baloise	+ 11"
5	Alexander Krieger (GER)	Leopard Pro Cycling	+ 13"
6	Andrea Pasqualon (ITA)	Wanty–Gobert	+ 14"
7	Anthony Perez (FRA)	Cofidis	+ 15"
8	Jonathan Hivert (FRA)	Total Direct Énergie	+ 15"
9	Kevin Geniets (LUX)	Luxembourg	+ 16"
10	Benjamin Declercq (BEL)	Sport Vlaanderen–Baloise	+ 16"

=== Stage 3 ===
8 June 2019 — Mondorf to Diekirch, 178.7 km (111.0 mi)

Stage 3 Result
Rank	Rider	Team	Time
1	Jesús Herrada (ESP)	Cofidis	4h 30' 47"
2	Maurits Lammertink (NED)	Roompot–Charles	+ 3"
3	Anthony Turgis (FRA)	Total Direct Énergie	+ 7"
4	Julien El Fares (FRA)	Delko–Marseille Provence	+ 10"
5	Baptiste Planckaert (BEL)	Wallonie Bruxelles	+ 13"
6	Rasmus Quaade (DEN)	Riwal Readynez	+ 13"
7	Szymon Rekita (POL)	Leopard Pro Cycling	+ 13"
8	Pieter Weening (NED)	Roompot–Charles	+ 13"
9	Jonas Rutsch (GER)	Team Lotto–Kern Haus	+ 13"
10	Joaquim Silva (POR)	W52 / FC Porto	+ 13"

General classification after Stage 3
Rank	Rider	Team	Time
1	Jesús Herrada (ESP)	Cofidis	13h 22' 53"
2	Maurits Lammertink (NED)	Roompot–Charles	+ 9"
3	Anthony Turgis (FRA)	Total Direct Énergie	+ 18"
4	Pieter Weening (NED)	Roompot–Charles	+ 23"
5	Andrea Pasqualon (ITA)	Wanty–Gobert	+ 24"
6	Szymon Rekita (POL)	Leopard Pro Cycling	+ 25"
7	Baptiste Planckaert (BEL)	Wallonie Bruxelles	+ 28"
8	Jonas Rutsch (GER)	Team Lotto–Kern Haus	+ 29"
9	Luca Wackermann (ITA)	Bardiani–CSF	+ 35"
10	Julien El Fares (FRA)	Delko–Marseille Provence	+ 36"

=== Stage 4 ===
9 June 2019 — Mersch to Luxembourg City, 176 km (109 mi)

Stage 4 Result
Rank	Rider	Team	Time
1	Jesús Herrada (ESP)	Cofidis	4h 19' 06"
2	Jonathan Hivert (FRA)	Total Direct Énergie	+ 2"
3	Pit Leyder (LUX)	Leopard Pro Cycling	+ 2"
4	Andrea Pasqualon (ITA)	Wanty–Gobert	+ 2"
5	Maurits Lammertink (NED)	Roompot–Charles	+ 6"
6	Julien El Fares (FRA)	Delko–Marseille Provence	+ 8"
7	Huub Duijn (NED)	Roompot–Charles	+ 9"
8	Baptiste Planckaert (BEL)	Wallonie Bruxelles	+ 9"
9	Benjamin Declercq (BEL)	Sport Vlaanderen–Baloise	+ 9"
10	Anthony Turgis (FRA)	Total Direct Énergie	+ 9"

General classification after Stage 4
Rank	Rider	Team	Time
1	Jesús Herrada (ESP)	Cofidis	17h 41' 49"
2	Maurits Lammertink (NED)	Roompot–Charles	+ 25"
3	Andrea Pasqualon (ITA)	Wanty–Gobert	+ 36"
4	Anthony Turgis (FRA)	Total Direct Énergie	+ 37"
5	Szymon Rekita (POL)	Leopard Pro Cycling	+ 44"
6	Baptiste Planckaert (BEL)	Wallonie Bruxelles	+ 47"
7	Julien El Fares (FRA)	Delko–Marseille Provence	+ 54"
8	Jonas Rutsch (GER)	Team Lotto–Kern Haus	+ 54"
9	Luca Wackermann (ITA)	Bardiani–CSF	+ 58"
10	Joaquim Silva (POR)	W52 / FC Porto	+ 59"

== Classification leadership table ==
Stage	Winner	General classification	Points classification	Mountains classification	Young rider classification	Teams classification
P	Christophe Laporte	Christophe Laporte	Christophe Laporte	not awarded	Piet Allegaert	Cofidis
1	Christophe Laporte	Christophe Laporte	Christophe Laporte	Robin Carpenter	Piet Allegaert	Cofidis
2	Pieter Weening	Christophe Laporte	Christophe Laporte	Robin Carpenter	Aimé De Gendt	Cofidis
3	Jesús Herrada	Jesús Herrada	Eduard-Michael Grosu	Robin Carpenter	Anthony Turgis	Roompot–Charles
4	Jesús Herrada	Jesús Herrada	Jesús Herrada	Robin Carpenter	Anthony Turgis	Roompot–Charles
Final		Jesús Herrada	Jesús Herrada	Robin Carpenter	Anthony Turgis	Roompot–Charles

== Final classification standings ==
Legend
Denotes the winner of the general classification	Denotes the winner of the mountains classification
Denotes the winner of the points classification	Denotes the winner of the young rider classification

=== General classification ===
Final general classification (1–10)
Rank	Rider	Team	Time
1	Jesús Herrada (ESP)	Cofidis	17h 41' 49"
2	Maurits Lammertink (NED)	Roompot–Charles	+ 25"
3	Andrea Pasqualon (ITA)	Wanty–Gobert	+ 36"
4	Anthony Turgis (FRA)	Total Direct Énergie	+ 37"
5	Szymon Rekita (POL)	Leopard Pro Cycling	+ 44"
6	Baptiste Planckaert (BEL)	Wallonie Bruxelles	+ 47"
7	Julien El Fares (FRA)	Delko–Marseille Provence	+ 54"
8	Jonas Rutsch (GER)	Team Lotto–Kern Haus	+ 54"
9	Luca Wackermann (ITA)	Bardiani–CSF	+ 58"
10	Joaquim Silva (POR)	W52 / FC Porto	+ 59"

=== Points classification ===
Final points classification (1–10)
Rank	Rider	Team	Points
1	Jesús Herrada (ESP)	Cofidis	40
2	Eduard-Michael Grosu (ROU)	Delko–Marseille Provence	29
3	Andrea Pasqualon (ITA)	Wanty–Gobert	26
4	Maurits Lammertink (NED)	Roompot–Charles	25
5	Pieter Weening (NED)	Roompot–Charles	23
6	Baptiste Planckaert (BEL)	Wallonie Bruxelles	23
7	Jonathan Hivert (FRA)	Total Direct Énergie	21
8	Julien El Fares (FRA)	Delko–Marseille Provence	18
9	Marcel Meisen (GER)	Corendon–Circus	16
10	Anthony Turgis (FRA)	Total Direct Énergie	14

=== Mountains classification ===
Final mountains classification (1–10)
Rank	Rider	Team	Points
1	Robin Carpenter (USA)	Rally UHC Cycling	36
2	Alessandro Tonelli (ITA)	Bardiani–CSF	17
3	Delio Fernández (ESP)	Delko–Marseille Provence	15
4	Dries De Bondt (BEL)	Corendon–Circus	13
5	Joaquim Silva (POR)	W52 / FC Porto	8
6	Pieter Weening (NED)	Roompot–Charles	8
7	Mauro Finetto (ITA)	Delko–Marseille Provence	7
8	Loïc Vliegen (BEL)	Wanty–Gobert	6
9	Szymon Rekita (POL)	Leopard Pro Cycling	5
10	Anthony Perez (FRA)	Cofidis	5

=== Young rider classification ===
Final young rider classification (1–10)
Rank	Rider	Team	Time
1	Anthony Turgis (FRA)	Total Direct Énergie	17h 42' 26"
2	Szymon Rekita (POL)	Leopard Pro Cycling	+ 7"
3	Jonas Rutsch (GER)	Team Lotto–Kern Haus	+ 17"
4	Pit Leyder (LUX)	Leopard Pro Cycling	+ 43"
5	Kevin Geniets (LUX)	Luxembourg	+ 57"
6	Benjamin Declercq (BEL)	Sport Vlaanderen–Baloise	+ 57"
7	Otto Vergaerde (BEL)	Corendon–Circus	+ 1' 04"
8	Rémy Rochas (FRA)	Delko–Marseille Provence	+ 1' 10"
9	Vincenzo Albanese (ITA)	Bardiani–CSF	+ 1' 34"
10	Piet Allegaert (BEL)	Sport Vlaanderen–Baloise	+ 1' 42"

=== Teams classification ===
Final teams classification (1–10)
Rank	Team	Time
1	Roompot–Charles	53h 08' 45"
2	Delko–Marseille Provence	+ 47"
3	Sport Vlaanderen–Baloise	+ 1' 39"
4	Leopard Pro Cycling	+ 1' 45"
5	Cofidis	+ 3' 09"
6	Wallonie Bruxelles	+ 3' 38"
7	Total Direct Énergie	+ 4' 05"
8	Wanty–Gobert	+ 4' 31"
9	Bardiani–CSF	+ 5' 32"
10	Corendon–Circus	+ 5' 44"
