= Julien El Fares =

French road bicycle racer

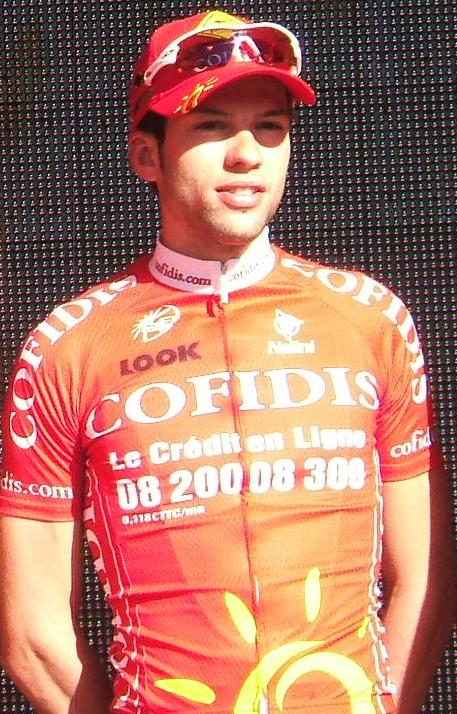

Personal information
- Full name: Julien El Fares
- Born: 1 June 1985 (age 41) Manosque, France
- Height: 1.73 m (5 ft 8 in)
- Weight: 63 kg (139 lb; 9.9 st)

Cycling career
- Sport: Cycling
- Current team: Retired
- Discipline: Road
- Role: Rider
- Rider type: Climber

Amateur teams
- 2005: Vélo-Club La Pomme Marseille
- 2006–2007: AVC Aix-en-Provence
- 2006: Cofidis (stagiaire)
- 2007: Cofidis (stagiaire)

Professional teams
- 2008–2011: Cofidis
- 2012: Team Type 1–Sanofi
- 2013: Sojasun
- 2014–2020: Team La Pomme Marseille 13
- 2021: EF Education–Nippo

Julien El Fares (born 1 June 1985) is a French former professional road racing cyclist, who rode professionally between 2008 and 2021 for the Cofidis, Team Type 1–Sanofi, Sojasun, Nippo–Delko–One Provence and EF Education–Nippo teams. During his career, he took three professional wins: the first stage of the 2009 Tirreno–Adriatico, the general classification at the 2009 Tour de Wallonie and the fourth stage of the 2010 Tour Méditerranéen.

== Major results ==
2006
5th Overall Ronde de l'Isard
8th Overall Tour des Pyrénées

1st Stage 1

2007
6th Liège–Bastogne–Liège U23
7th Overall La Tropicale Amissa Bongo Ondimbo
9th Overall Grand Prix du Portugal
2008
7th Overall GP CTT Correios de Portugal
2009
1st Overall Tour de Wallonie
1st Stage 1 Tirreno–Adriatico
4th Overall Circuit de la Sarthe
5th Polynormande
2010
3rd Overall Tour du Haut Var
10th Overall Tour Méditerranéen

1st Stage 4

10th Gran Premio dell'Insubria-Lugano
2011
2nd Polynormande
8th Overall Tour de Luxembourg
9th Boucles de l'Aulne
10th Grand Prix d'Ouverture La Marseillaise
10th Grand Prix de Plumelec-Morbihan
2012
2nd Overall Tour du Haut Var
7th Route Adélie
8th Boucles de l'Aulne
2013
4th Overall Four Days of Dunkirk
6th Classic Loire Atlantique
7th Overall Tour de Luxembourg
7th La Roue Tourangelle
8th Klasika Primavera
8th Paris–Camembert
2014
5th Overall Tour of Hainan
2015
2nd Paris–Troyes
3rd Overall Tour of Hainan

1st Mountains classification

5th Classic Loire Atlantique
6th Overall Boucles de la Mayenne
7th Overall Tour du Haut Var
7th Overall Tour of Yancheng Coastal Wetlands
7th Boucles de l'Aulne
2016
10th Overall Tour du Limousin
2017
4th Grand Prix d'Ouverture La Marseillaise
6th Overall Tour La Provence
6th Boucles de l'Aulne
10th Overall Tour du Haut Var
2018
3rd Overall Tour of Hainan
2019
3rd Boucles de l'Aulne
4th Mont Ventoux Dénivelé Challenge
5th Paris–Camembert
7th Overall Tour du Haut Var
7th Overall Tour de Luxembourg
8th Grand Prix de Plumelec-Morbihan
10th Overall Tour of Fuzhou
2020
8th Overall Tour des Alpes-Maritimes et du Var
2021
9th Grand Prix La Marseillaise
