= 2025 Settimana Internazionale di Coppi e Bartali =

Italian cycling race

2025 UCI Europe Tour

Race details
- Dates: 25–29 March 2025
- Stages: 5
- Distance: 763.4 km (474.4 mi)
- Winning time: 18h 40' 04"

Results
Jersey awarded to the overall winner	Winner	Ben Tulett (GBR)	(Visma–Lease a Bike)
	Second	Mark Donovan (GBR)	(Q36.5 Pro Cycling Team)
	Third	Igor Arrieta (ESP)	(UAE Team Emirates XRG)
Jersey awarded to the points classification winner	Points	Jay Vine (AUS)	(UAE Team Emirates XRG)
Jersey awarded to the mountains classification winner	Mountains	Marc Cabedo (ESP)	(JCL Team Ukyo)
Jersey awarded to the youth classification winner	Youth	Igor Arrieta (ESP)	(UAE Team Emirates XRG)
	Team	(United Arab Emirates) UAE Team Emirates XRG	

The 2025 Settimana Internazionale di Coppi e Bartali is a road cycling stage race that took place between 25 and 29 March 2025 in the Italian region of Emilia-Romagna. The race is rated as a category 2.1 event on the 2025 UCI Europe Tour calendar, and will be the 40th edition of the Settimana Internazionale di Coppi e Bartali.

== Teams ==
Seven of the 18 UCI WorldTeams, eight UCI ProTeams, and ten UCI Continental teams make up the 25 teams that will participate in the race.

UCI WorldTeams

- EF Education–EasyPost
- Ineos Grenadiers
- Soudal–Quick-Step
- Team Jayco–AlUla
- UAE Team Emirates XRG
- Visma–Lease a Bike
- XDS Astana Team

UCI ProTeams

- Israel–Premier Tech
- Team Polti VisitMalta
- Q36.5 Pro Cycling Team
- Team TotalEnergies
- Team Solution Tech–Vini Fantini
- Unibet Tietema Rockets
- VF Group–Bardiani–CSF–Faizanè
- Wagner Bazin WB

UCI Continental Teams

- General Store–Essegibi–Fratelli Curia
- JCL Team Ukyo
- Lotto Development Team
- MBH Bank Ballan CSB
- Petrolike
- Red Bull–Bora–Hansgrohe Rookies
- Sam–Vitalcare–Dynatek
- S.C. Padovani Polo Cherry Bank
- Team Technipes #inEmiliaRomagna
- Team Vorarlberg

== Route ==
Stage characteristics and winners
Stage	Date	Course	Distance	Type	Winner
1	25 March	Ferrara to Bondeno	174.5 km (108.4 mi)	Flat stage	Caleb Ewan (AUS)
2	26 March	Riccione to Sogliano al Rubicone	163.9 km (101.8 mi)	Medium-mountain stage	Paul Double (GBR)
3	27 March	Riccione to Cesena	142.1 km (88.3 mi)	Hilly stage	Jay Vine (AUS)
4	28 March	Brisighella to Brisighella	150.4 km (93.5 mi)	Medium-mountain stage	Ben Tulett (GBR)
5	29 March	Brisighella to Forlì	132.5 km (82.3 mi)	Hilly stage	Jay Vine (AUS)
Total			763.4 km (474.4 mi)		

== Stages ==
=== Stage 1 ===
25 March 2025 — Ferrara to Bondeno, 174.5 km (108.4 mi)

Stage 1 Result (1–10)
Rank	Rider	Team	Time
1	Caleb Ewan (AUS)	Ineos Grenadiers	3h 47' 29"
2	Oded Kogut (ISR)	Israel–Premier Tech	+ 0"
3	Jason Tesson (FRA)	Team TotalEnergies	+ 0"
4	Davide Donati (ITA)	Red Bull–Bora–Hansgrohe Rookies	+ 0"
5	Ben Swift (GBR)	Ineos Grenadiers	+ 0"
6	Alessio Menghini (ITA)	General Store–Essegibi–Fratelli Curia	+ 0"
7	Andrea Raccagni Noviero (ITA)	Soudal–Quick-Step	+ 0"
8	Emīls Liepiņš (LAT)	Q36.5 Pro Cycling Team	+ 0"
9	Colby Simmons (USA)	EF Education–EasyPost	+ 0"
10	Alexander Konychev (ITA)	Team Vorarlberg	+ 0"

General classification after Stage 1 (1–10)
Rank	Rider	Team	Time
1	Caleb Ewan (AUS)	Ineos Grenadiers	3h 47' 19"
2	Oded Kogut (ISR)	Israel–Premier Tech	+ 4"
3	Jason Tesson (FRA)	Team TotalEnergies	+ 6"
4	Davide Donati (ITA)	Red Bull–Bora–Hansgrohe Rookies	+ 10"
5	Ben Swift (GBR)	Ineos Grenadiers	+ 10"
6	Alessio Menghini (ITA)	General Store–Essegibi–Fratelli Curia	+ 10"
7	Andrea Raccagni Noviero (ITA)	Soudal–Quick-Step	+ 10"
8	Emīls Liepiņš (LAT)	Q36.5 Pro Cycling Team	+ 10"
9	Colby Simmons (USA)	EF Education–EasyPost	+ 10"
10	Alexander Konychev (ITA)	Team Vorarlberg	+ 10"

=== Stage 2 ===
26 March 2025 — Riccione to Sogliano al Rubicone, 163.9 km (101.8 mi)

Stage 2 Result (1–10)
Rank	Rider	Team	Time
1	Paul Double (GBR)	Team Jayco–AlUla	4h 18' 23"
2	Jarno Widar (BEL)	Lotto Development Team	+ 0"
3	Diego Ulissi (ITA)	UAE Team Emirates XRG	+ 0"
4	Ben Tulett (GBR)	Visma–Lease a Bike	+ 0"
5	Magnus Sheffield (USA)	Ineos Grenadiers	+ 3"
6	Davide De Pretto (ITA)	Team Jayco–AlUla	+ 3"
7	Alexey Lutsenko (KAZ)	Israel–Premier Tech	+ 5"
8	Alessandro Covi (ITA)	UAE Team Emirates XRG	+ 5"
9	Simone Velasco (ITA)	XDS Astana Team	+ 5"
10	Brandon Rivera (COL)	Ineos Grenadiers	+ 5"

General classification after Stage 2 (1–10)
Rank	Rider	Team	Time
1	Paul Double (GBR)	Team Jayco–AlUla	8h 05' 42"
2	Jarno Widar (BEL)	Lotto Development Team	+ 4"
3	Diego Ulissi (ITA)	UAE Team Emirates XRG	+ 6"
4	Ben Tulett (GBR)	Visma–Lease a Bike	+ 10"
5	Davide De Pretto (ITA)	Team Jayco–AlUla	+ 13"
6	Magnus Sheffield (USA)	Ineos Grenadiers	+ 13"
7	Brandon Rivera (COL)	Ineos Grenadiers	+ 15"
8	Alexey Lutsenko (KAZ)	XDS Astana Team	+ 15"
9	Mark Donovan (GBR)	Q36.5 Pro Cycling Team	+ 15"
10	Alessandro Covi (ITA)	UAE Team Emirates XRG	+ 15"

=== Stage 3 ===
27 March 2025 — Riccione to Cesena, 142.1 km (88.3 mi)

Stage 3 Result (1–10)
Rank	Rider	Team	Time
1	Jay Vine (AUS)	UAE Team Emirates XRG	3h 40' 58"
2	Magnus Sheffield (USA)	Ineos Grenadiers	+ 26"
3	Simone Velasco (ITA)	XDS Astana Team	+ 26"
4	Alessandro Pinarello (ITA)	VF Group–Bardiani–CSF–Faizanè	+ 26"
5	Giovanni Carboni (ITA)	Unibet Tietema Rockets	+ 26"
6	Davide De Pretto (ITA)	Team Jayco–AlUla	+ 26"
7	Mattéo Vercher (FRA)	Team TotalEnergies	+ 26"
8	Ben Tulett (GBR)	Visma–Lease a Bike	+ 26"
9	Andrea Raccagni Noviero (ITA)	Soudal–Quick-Step	+ 26"
10	Mark Donovan (GBR)	Q36.5 Pro Cycling Team	+ 26"

General classification after Stage 3 (1–10)
Rank	Rider	Team	Time
1	Magnus Sheffield (USA)	Ineos Grenadiers	11h 47' 13"
2	Ben Tulett (GBR)	Visma–Lease a Bike	+ 3"
3	Simone Velasco (ITA)	XDS Astana Team	+ 4"
4	Davide De Pretto (ITA)	Team Jayco–AlUla	+ 6"
5	Alexey Lutsenko (KAZ)	XDS Astana Team	+ 8"
6	Mark Donovan (GBR)	Q36.5 Pro Cycling Team	+ 8"
7	Alessandro Covi (ITA)	UAE Team Emirates XRG	+ 8"
8	Alessandro Pinarello (ITA)	VF Group–Bardiani–CSF–Faizanè	+ 11"
9	Mattéo Vercher (FRA)	Team TotalEnergies	+ 13"
10	Giovanni Carboni (ITA)	Unibet Tietema Rockets	+ 16"

=== Stage 4 ===
28 March 2025 — Brisighella to Brisighella, 150.4 km (93.5 mi)

Stage 4 Result (1–10)
Rank	Rider	Team	Time
1	Ben Tulett (GBR)	Visma–Lease a Bike	3h 41' 21"
2	Igor Arrieta (ESP)	UAE Team Emirates XRG	+ 6"
3	Mark Donovan (GBR)	Q36.5 Pro Cycling Team	+ 7"
4	Simone Velasco (ITA)	XDS Astana Team	+ 15"
5	Emil Herzog (GER)	Red Bull–Bora–Hansgrohe Rookies	+ 15"
6	Mattéo Vercher (FRA)	Team TotalEnergies	+ 15"
7	Giovanni Carboni (ITA)	Unibet Tietema Rockets	+ 15"
8	Alexey Lutsenko (KAZ)	Israel–Premier Tech	+ 15"
9	Viktor Soenens (BEL)	Soudal–Quick-Step	+ 15"
10	Thomas Pesenti (ITA)	Soudal–Quick-Step	+ 15"

General classification after Stage 4 (1–10)
Rank	Rider	Team	Time
1	Ben Tulett (GBR)	Visma–Lease a Bike	15h 28' 27"
2	Mark Donovan (GBR)	Q36.5 Pro Cycling Team	+ 18"
3	Igor Arrieta (ESP)	UAE Team Emirates XRG	+ 23"
4	Simone Velasco (ITA)	XDS Astana Team	+ 26"
5	Davide De Pretto (ITA)	Team Jayco–AlUla	+ 28"
6	Alexey Lutsenko (KAZ)	Israel–Premier Tech	+ 30"
7	Alessandro Covi (ITA)	UAE Team Emirates XRG	+ 30"
8	Mattéo Vercher (FRA)	Team TotalEnergies	+ 35"
9	Giovanni Carboni (ITA)	Unibet Tietema Rockets	+ 38"
10	Emil Herzog (GER)	Red Bull–Bora–Hansgrohe Rookies	+ 42"

=== Stage 5 ===
29 March 2025 — Brisighella to Forlì, 132.5 km (82.3 mi)

Stage 5 Result (1–10)
Rank	Rider	Team	Time
1	Jay Vine (AUS)	UAE Team Emirates XRG	3h 11' 04"
2	Davide Donati (ITA)	Red Bull–Bora–Hansgrohe Rookies	+ 33"
3	Alexey Lutsenko (KAZ)	Israel–Premier Tech	+ 33"
4	Magnus Sheffield (USA)	Ineos Grenadiers	+ 33"
5	Mark Donovan (GBR)	Q36.5 Pro Cycling Team	+ 33"
6	Mattéo Vercher (FRA)	Team TotalEnergies	+ 33"
7	Emil Herzog (GER)	Red Bull–Bora–Hansgrohe Rookies	+ 33"
8	Lorenzo Nespoli (ITA)	MBH Bank Ballan CSB	+ 33"
9	Giovanni Carboni (ITA)	Unibet Tietema Rockets	+ 33"
10	Alessandro Fancellu (ITA)	JCL Team Ukyo	+ 33"

General classification after Stage 5 (1–10)
Rank	Rider	Team	Time
1	Ben Tulett (GBR)	Visma–Lease a Bike	18h 40' 04"
2	Mark Donovan (GBR)	Q36.5 Pro Cycling Team	+ 18"
3	Igor Arrieta (ESP)	UAE Team Emirates XRG	+ 23"
4	Alexey Lutsenko (KAZ)	Israel–Premier Tech	+ 26"
5	Simone Velasco (ITA)	XDS Astana Team	+ 26"
6	Mattéo Vercher (FRA)	Team TotalEnergies	+ 35"
7	Giovanni Carboni (ITA)	Unibet Tietema Rockets	+ 38"
8	Emil Herzog (GER)	Red Bull–Bora–Hansgrohe Rookies	+ 42"
9	Alessandro Pinarello (ITA)	VF Group–Bardiani–CSF–Faizanè	+ 45"
10	Magnus Sheffield (USA)	Ineos Grenadiers	+ 47"

== Classification leadership table ==
Classification leadership by stage
Stage	Winner	General classification	Points classification	Mountains classification	Young rider classification	Team classification
1	Caleb Ewan	Caleb Ewan	Caleb Ewan	Kevin Pezzo Rosola	Davide Donati	Ineos Grenadiers
2	Paul Double	Paul Double	Paul Double	Marc Cabedo	Jarno Widar	UAE Team Emirates XRG
3	Jay Vine	Magnus Sheffield	Magnus Sheffield	Marc Cabedo	Magnus Sheffield	UAE Team Emirates XRG
4	Ben Tulett	Ben Tulett	Ben Tulett	Marc Cabedo	Igor Arrieta	UAE Team Emirates XRG
5	Jay Vine	Ben Tulett	Jay Vine	Marc Cabedo	Igor Arrieta	UAE Team Emirates XRG
Final		Ben Tulett	Jay Vine	Marc Cabedo	Igor Arrieta	UAE Team Emirates XRG

== Classification standings ==
Legend
Denotes the leader of the general classification	Denotes the leader of the mountains classification
Denotes the leader of the points classification	Denotes the leader of the young rider classification

=== General classification ===
Final General classification (1-10)
Rank	Rider	Team	Time
1	Ben Tulett (GBR)	Visma–Lease a Bike	18h 40' 04"
2	Mark Donovan (GBR)	Q36.5 Pro Cycling Team	+ 18"
3	Igor Arrieta (ESP)	UAE Team Emirates XRG	+ 23"
4	Alexey Lutsenko (KAZ)	Israel–Premier Tech	+ 26"
5	Simone Velasco (ITA)	XDS Astana Team	+ 26"
6	Mattéo Vercher (FRA)	Team TotalEnergies	+ 35"
7	Giovanni Carboni (ITA)	Unibet Tietema Rockets	+ 38"
8	Emil Herzog (GER)	Red Bull–Bora–Hansgrohe Rookies	+ 42"
9	Alessandro Pinarello (ITA)	VF Group–Bardiani–CSF–Faizanè	+ 45"
10	Magnus Sheffield (USA)	Ineos Grenadiers	+ 47"

=== Points classification ===
Final points classification (1-10)
Rank	Rider	Team	Points
1	Jay Vine (AUS)	UAE Team Emirates XRG	20
2	Magnus Sheffield (USA)	Ineos Grenadiers	17
3	Ben Tulett (GBR)	Visma–Lease a Bike	16
4	Davide Donati (ITA)	Red Bull–Bora–Hansgrohe Rookies	13
5	Simone Velasco (ITA)	XDS Astana Team	11
6	Paul Double (GBR)	Team Jayco–AlUla	10
7	Mark Donovan (GBR)	Q36.5 Pro Cycling Team	10
8	Alexey Lutsenko (KAZ)	XDS Astana Team	9
9	Igor Arrieta (ESP)	UAE Team Emirates XRG	8
10	Mattéo Vercher (FRA)	Team TotalEnergies	8

=== Mountains classification ===
Final mountains classification (1-10)
Rank	Rider	Team	Points
1	Marc Cabedo (ESP)	JCL Team Ukyo	26
2	Jay Vine (AUS)	UAE Team Emirates XRG	26
3	Pascal Eenkhoorn (NED)	Soudal–Quick-Step	21
4	Magnus Sheffield (USA)	Ineos Grenadiers	19
5	Paul Double (GBR)	Team Jayco–AlUla	15
6	Ben Tulett (GBR)	Visma–Lease a Bike	10
7	Marcel Camprubí (ESP)	Q36.5 Pro Cycling Team	10
8	Mathieu Burgaudeau (FRA)	Team TotalEnergies	9
9	Walter Calzoni (ITA)	Q36.5 Pro Cycling Team	8
10	Enea Sambinello (ITA)	UAE Team Emirates XRG	8

=== Young rider classification ===
Final young rider classification (1-10)
Rank	Rider	Team	Time
1	Igor Arrieta (ESP)	UAE Team Emirates XRG	+ 18h 40' 27"
2	Emil Herzog (GER)	Red Bull–Bora–Hansgrohe Rookies	+ 19"
3	Alessandro Pinarello (ITA)	VF Group–Bardiani–CSF–Faizanè	+ 22"
4	Magnus Sheffield (USA)	Ineos Grenadiers	+ 24"
5	Viktor Soenens (BEL)	Soudal–Quick-Step	+ 30"
6	Davide De Pretto (ITA)	Team Jayco–AlUla	+ 2' 16"
7	Florian Samuel Kajamini (ITA)	XDS Astana Team	+ 6' 12"
8	Jarno Widar (BEL)	Lotto Development Team	+ 9' 43"
9	Jørgen Nordhagen (NOR)	Visma–Lease a Bike	+ 15' 50"
10	Tijmen Graat (NED)	Visma–Lease a Bike	+ 15' 58"

=== Team classification ===
Final teams classification (1-10)
Rank	Team	Time
1	(United Arab Emirates) UAE Team Emirates XRG	56h 00' 50"
2	(Kazakhstan) XDS Astana Team	+ 9' 46"
3	(Belgium) Soudal–Quick-Step	+ 10' 02"
4	(Germany) Red Bull–Bora–Hansgrohe Rookies	+ 15' 24"
5	(Switzerland) Q36.5 Pro Cycling Team	+ 21' 06"
6	(France) Team TotalEnergies	+ 23' 00"
7	(France) Unibet Tietema Rockets	+ 26' 10"
8	(Netherlands) Visma–Lease a Bike	+ 30' 04"
9	(Italy) VF Group–Bardiani–CSF–Faizanè	+ 31' 58"
10	(United Kingdom) Ineos Grenadiers	+ 32' 30"
