= 2024 Tour de Luxembourg =

2024 UCI ProSeries

Race details
- Dates: 18–22 September 2024
- Stages: 5
- Distance: 706.7 km (439.1 mi)
- Winning time: 16h 47' 34"

Results
Jersey awarded to the overall winner	Winner	Antonio Tiberi (ITA)	(Team Bahrain Victorious)
	Second	Mathieu van der Poel (NED)	(Alpecin–Deceuninck)
	Third	David Gaudu (FRA)	(Groupama–FDJ)
Jersey awarded to the points classification winner	Points	Mathieu van der Poel (NED)	(Alpecin–Deceuninck)
Jersey awarded to the mountains classification winner	Mountains	Pepijn Reinderink (NED)	(Soudal–Quick-Step)
Jersey awarded to the youth classification winner	Youth	Antonio Tiberi (ITA)	(Team Bahrain Victorious)
	Team	(United Arab Emirates) UAE Team Emirates	

The 2024 Tour de Luxembourg (officially Škoda Tour de Luxembourg 2024 for sponsorships reasons) was the 84th edition of the Tour de Luxembourg road cycling stage race, which is the part of the 2024 UCI ProSeries. It began on the 18th of September in Luxembourg City and finished on the 22nd of September also in Luxembourg City.

== Teams ==
Ten UCI WorldTeams, eight UCI ProTeams, and Luxembourg national team made up the nineteen teams that participated in the race.

UCI WorldTeams

- Alpecin–Deceuninck
- Decathlon–AG2R La Mondiale
- EF Education–EasyPost
- Groupama–FDJ
- Lidl–Trek
- Movistar Team
- Soudal–Quick-Step
- Team Bahrain Victorious
- UAE Team Emirates
- Visma–Lease a Bike

UCI ProTeams

- Lotto–Dstny
- Polti–Kometa
- Q36.5 Pro Cycling Team
- TDT–Unibet Cycling Team
- Team Flanders–Baloise
- Team TotalEnergies
- Tudor Pro Cycling Team
- Uno-X Mobility

National Teams

- Luxembourg

== Route ==
Stage characteristics and winners
Stage	Date	Course	Distance	Type	Stage winner
1	18 September	Luxembourg City to Luxembourg City	158 km (98 mi)	Hilly stage	Mathieu van der Poel (NED)
2	19 September	Junglinster to Schifflange	155 km (96 mi)	Hilly stage	Mads Pedersen (DEN)
3	20 September	Rosport to Diekirch	201.3 km (125.1 mi)	Hilly stage	Mauri Vansevenant (BEL)
4	21 September	Differdange to Differdange	15.5 km (9.6 mi)	Individual time trial	Juan Ayuso (ESP)
5	22 September	Mersch to Luxembourg City	176.9 km (109.9 mi)	Hilly stage	David Gaudu (FRA)
Total			706.7 km (439.1 mi)		

== Stages ==
=== Stage 1 ===
18 September — Luxembourg City to Luxembourg City, 158 km (98 mi)

Stage 1 Result
Rank	Rider	Team	Time
1	Mathieu van der Poel (NED)	Alpecin–Deceuninck	3h 46' 28"
2	Christophe Laporte (FRA)	Visma–Lease a Bike	+ 0"
3	Andreas Kron (DEN)	Lotto–Dstny	+ 0"
4	Bart Lemmen (NED)	Visma–Lease a Bike	+ 0"
5	Finn Fisher-Black (NZL)	UAE Team Emirates	+ 0"
6	Antonio Tiberi (ITA)	Team Bahrain Victorious	+ 0"
7	Wilco Kelderman (NED)	Visma–Lease a Bike	+ 0"
8	Ruben Guerreiro (POR)	Movistar Team	+ 0"
9	Jon Barrenetxea (ESP)	Movistar Team	+ 0"
10	Jordan Labrosse (FRA)	Decathlon–AG2R La Mondiale	+ 0"

General classification after Stage 1
Rank	Rider	Team	Time
1	Mathieu van der Poel (NED)	Alpecin–Deceuninck	3h 46' 18"
2	Christophe Laporte (FRA)	Visma–Lease a Bike	+ 4"
3	Andreas Kron (DEN)	Lotto–Dstny	+ 6"
4	Marc Hirschi (SUI)	UAE Team Emirates	+ 9"
5	Bart Lemmen (NED)	Visma–Lease a Bike	+ 10"
6	Finn Fisher-Black (NZL)	UAE Team Emirates	+ 10"
7	Antonio Tiberi (ITA)	Team Bahrain Victorious	+ 10"
8	Wilco Kelderman (NED)	Visma–Lease a Bike	+ 10"
9	Ruben Guerreiro (POR)	Movistar Team	+ 10"
10	Jon Barrenetxea (ESP)	Movistar Team	+ 10"

=== Stage 2 ===
19 September — Junglinster to Schifflange, 155 km (96 mi)

Stage 2 Result
Rank	Rider	Team	Time
1	Mads Pedersen (DEN)	Lidl–Trek	3h 41' 27"
2	Mathieu van der Poel (NED)	Alpecin–Deceuninck	+ 0"
3	Robin Froidevaux (SUI)	Tudor Pro Cycling Team	+ 0"
4	Christophe Laporte (FRA)	Visma–Lease a Bike	+ 0"
5	Fred Wright (GBR)	Team Bahrain Victorious	+ 0"
6	Mirco Maestri (ITA)	Polti–Kometa	+ 0"
7	Ivo Oliveira (POR)	UAE Team Emirates	+ 0"
8	Laurence Pithie (NZL)	Groupama–FDJ	+ 0"
9	Lorenzo Milesi (ITA)	Movistar Team	+ 0"
10	Antonio Tiberi (ITA)	Team Bahrain Victorious	+ 0"

General classification after Stage 2
Rank	Rider	Team	Time
1	Mathieu van der Poel (NED)	Alpecin–Deceuninck	7h 27' 39"
2	Christophe Laporte (FRA)	Visma–Lease a Bike	+ 10"
3	Andreas Kron (DEN)	Lotto–Dstny	+ 12"
4	Marc Hirschi (SUI)	UAE Team Emirates	+ 12"
5	Carl Fredrik Hagen (NOR)	Q36.5 Pro Cycling Team	+ 13"
6	Idar Andersen (NOR)	Uno-X Mobility	+ 15"
7	Harry Sweeny (AUS)	EF Education–EasyPost	+ 15"
8	Antonio Tiberi (ITA)	Team Bahrain Victorious	+ 16"
9	Mirco Maestri (ITA)	Polti–Kometa	+ 16"
10	Jon Barrenetxea (ESP)	Movistar Team	+ 16"

=== Stage 3 ===
20 September — Rosport to Diekirch, 201.3 km (125.1 mi)

Stage 3 Result
Rank	Rider	Team	Time
1	Mauri Vansevenant (BEL)	Soudal–Quick-Step	4h 53' 34"
2	Mathieu van der Poel (NED)	Alpecin–Deceuninck	+ 41"
3	Marc Hirschi (SUI)	UAE Team Emirates	+ 41"
4	David Gaudu (FRA)	Groupama–FDJ	+ 41"
5	Bart Lemmen (NED)	Visma–Lease a Bike	+ 41"
6	Nicolas Prodhomme (FRA)	Decathlon–AG2R La Mondiale	+ 41"
7	Andreas Kron (DEN)	Lotto–Dstny	+ 41"
8	Wilco Kelderman (NED)	Visma–Lease a Bike	+ 41"
9	Juan Ayuso (ESP)	UAE Team Emirates	+ 41"
10	Antonio Tiberi (ITA)	Team Bahrain Victorious	+ 41"

General classification after Stage 3
Rank	Rider	Team	Time
1	Mauri Vansevenant (BEL)	Soudal–Quick-Step	12h 21' 16"
2	Mathieu van der Poel (NED)	Alpecin–Deceuninck	+ 32"
3	Marc Hirschi (SUI)	UAE Team Emirates	+ 45"
4	Andreas Kron (DEN)	Lotto–Dstny	+ 50"
5	Harry Sweeny (AUS)	EF Education–EasyPost	+ 53"
6	Antonio Tiberi (ITA)	Team Bahrain Victorious	+ 54"
7	Davide Piganzoli (ITA)	Polti–Kometa	+ 54"
8	Bart Lemmen (NED)	Visma–Lease a Bike	+ 54"
9	Wilco Kelderman (NED)	Visma–Lease a Bike	+ 54"
10	David Gaudu (FRA)	Groupama–FDJ	+ 54"

=== Stage 4 ===
21 September — Differdange to Differdange, 15.5 km (9.6 mi) (ITT)

Stage 4 Result
Rank	Rider	Team	Time
1	Juan Ayuso (ESP)	UAE Team Emirates	19' 11"
2	Antonio Tiberi (ITA)	Team Bahrain Victorious	+ 7"
3	Mads Pedersen (DEN)	Lidl–Trek	+ 11"
4	Marc Hirschi (SUI)	UAE Team Emirates	+ 14"
5	Mathieu van der Poel (NED)	Alpecin–Deceuninck	+ 19"
6	Felix Großschartner (AUT)	UAE Team Emirates	+ 20"
7	Lorenzo Milesi (ITA)	Movistar Team	+ 20"
8	Quinn Simmons (USA)	Lidl–Trek	+ 26"
9	Harry Sweeny (AUS)	EF Education–EasyPost	+ 26"
10	Alex Kirsch (LUX)	Lidl–Trek	+ 31"

General classification after Stage 4
Rank	Rider	Team	Time
1	Mathieu van der Poel (NED)	Alpecin–Deceuninck	12h 41' 18"
2	Juan Ayuso (ESP)	UAE Team Emirates	+ 3"
3	Mauri Vansevenant (BEL)	Soudal–Quick-Step	+ 3"
4	Marc Hirschi (SUI)	UAE Team Emirates	+ 8"
5	Antonio Tiberi (ITA)	Team Bahrain Victorious	+ 10"
6	Harry Sweeny (AUS)	EF Education–EasyPost	+ 28"
7	David Gaudu (FRA)	Groupama–FDJ	+ 39"
8	Davide Piganzoli (ITA)	Polti–Kometa	+ 46"
9	Mats Wenzel (LUX)	Luxembourg	+ 57"
10	Wilco Kelderman (NED)	Visma–Lease a Bike	+ 1' 02"

=== Stage 5 ===
22 September — Mersch to Luxembourg City, 176.9 km (109.9 mi)

Stage 5 Result
Rank	Rider	Team	Time
1	David Gaudu (FRA)	Groupama–FDJ	4h 06' 03"
2	Quinn Simmons (USA)	Lidl–Trek	+ 3"
3	Jordan Jegat (FRA)	Team TotalEnergies	+ 3"
4	Antonio Tiberi (ITA)	Team Bahrain Victorious	+ 3"
5	Mads Pedersen (DEN)	Lidl–Trek	+ 29"
6	Mathieu van der Poel (NED)	Alpecin–Deceuninck	+ 29"
7	Juan Ayuso (ESP)	UAE Team Emirates	+ 31"
8	Bastien Tronchon (FRA)	Decathlon–AG2R La Mondiale	+ 31"
9	Mauri Vansevenant (BEL)	Soudal–Quick-Step	+ 31"
10	Marc Hirschi (SUI)	UAE Team Emirates	+ 31"

General classification after Stage 5
Rank	Rider	Team	Time
1	Antonio Tiberi (ITA)	Team Bahrain Victorious	12h 41' 18"
2	Mathieu van der Poel (NED)	Alpecin–Deceuninck	+ 15"
3	David Gaudu (FRA)	Groupama–FDJ	+ 16"
4	Mauri Vansevenant (BEL)	Soudal–Quick-Step	+ 19"
5	Juan Ayuso (ESP)	UAE Team Emirates	+ 21"
6	Marc Hirschi (SUI)	UAE Team Emirates	+ 26"
7	Harry Sweeny (AUS)	EF Education–EasyPost	+ 46"
8	Jordan Jegat (FRA)	Team TotalEnergies	+ 54"
9	Davide Piganzoli (ITA)	Polti–Kometa	+ 1' 04"
10	Mats Wenzel (LUX)	Luxembourg	+ 1' 15"

== Classification leadership table ==
Classification leadership by stage
Stage	Winner	General classification	Points classification	Mountains classification	Young rider classification	Team classification
1	Mathieu van der Poel	Mathieu van der Poel	Mathieu van der Poel	Pepijn Reinderink	Finn Fisher-Black	Visma–Lease a Bike
2	Mads Pedersen	Mathieu van der Poel	Mathieu van der Poel	Pepijn Reinderink	Idar Andersen	Visma–Lease a Bike
3	Mauri Vansevenant	Mauri Vansevenant	Mathieu van der Poel	Pepijn Reinderink	Mauri Vansevenant	Movistar Team
4	Juan Ayuso	Mathieu van der Poel	Mathieu van der Poel	Pepijn Reinderink	Juan Ayuso	UAE Team Emirates
5	David Gaudu	Antonio Tiberi	Mathieu van der Poel	Pepijn Reinderink	Antonio Tiberi	UAE Team Emirates
Final		Antonio Tiberi	Mathieu van der Poel	Pepijn Reinderink	Antonio Tiberi	UAE Team Emirates

== Classification standings ==
Legend
Denotes the winner of the general classification	Denotes the winner of the young rider classification
Denotes the winner of the points classification	Denotes the winner of the mountains classification

=== General classification ===
Final general classification (1–10)
Rank	Rider	Team	Time
1	Antonio Tiberi (ITA)	Team Bahrain Victorious	16h 47' 34"
2	Mathieu van der Poel (NED)	Alpecin–Deceuninck	+ 15"
3	David Gaudu (FRA)	Groupama–FDJ	+ 16"
4	Mauri Vansevenant (BEL)	Soudal–Quick-Step	+ 19"
5	Juan Ayuso (ESP)	UAE Team Emirates	+ 21"
6	Marc Hirschi (SUI)	UAE Team Emirates	+ 26"
7	Harry Sweeny (AUS)	EF Education–EasyPost	+ 46"
8	Jordan Jegat (FRA)	Team TotalEnergies	+ 54"
9	Davide Piganzoli (ITA)	Polti–Kometa	+ 1' 04"
10	Mats Wenzel (LUX)	Luxembourg	+ 1' 15"

=== Points classification ===
Final points classification (1–10)
Rank	Rider	Team	Points
1	Mathieu van der Poel (NED)	Alpecin–Deceuninck	70
2	Mads Pedersen (DEN)	Lidl–Trek	42
3	Antonio Tiberi (ITA)	Team Bahrain Victorious	37
4	Marc Hirschi (SUI)	UAE Team Emirates	34
5	David Gaudu (FRA)	Groupama–FDJ	31
6	Mauri Vansevenant (BEL)	Soudal–Quick-Step	30
7	Juan Ayuso (ESP)	UAE Team Emirates	27
8	Quinn Simmons (USA)	Lidl–Trek	20
9	Wilco Kelderman (NED)	Visma–Lease a Bike	13
10	Jordan Jegat (FRA)	Team TotalEnergies	13

=== Mountains classification ===
Final mountains classification (1–10)
Rank	Rider	Team	Points
1	Pepijn Reinderink (NED)	Soudal–Quick-Step	26
2	Mauri Vansevenant (BEL)	Soudal–Quick-Step	20
3	Louis Vervaeke (BEL)	Soudal–Quick-Step	16
4	Johannes Kulset (NOR)	Uno-X Mobility	11
5	Johannes Staune-Mittet (NOR)	Visma–Lease a Bike	10
6	Mattia Bais (ITA)	Polti–Kometa	10
7	Alexandre Kess (LUX)	Luxembourg	9
8	Archie Ryan (IRL)	EF Education–EasyPost	8
9	Davide Piganzoli (ITA)	Polti–Kometa	5
10	Bastien Tronchon (FRA)	Decathlon–AG2R La Mondiale	5

=== Young rider classification ===
Final young rider classification (1–10)
Rank	Rider	Team	Time
1	Antonio Tiberi (ITA)	Team Bahrain Victorious	16h 47' 34"
2	Mauri Vansevenant (BEL)	Soudal–Quick-Step	+ 19"
3	Juan Ayuso (ESP)	UAE Team Emirates	+ 21"
4	Jordan Jegat (FRA)	Team TotalEnergies	+ 54"
5	Davide Piganzoli (ITA)	Polti–Kometa	+ 1' 04"
6	Mats Wenzel (LUX)	Luxembourg	+ 1' 15"
7	Quinn Simmons (USA)	Lidl–Trek	+ 1' 36"
8	Pelayo Sánchez (ESP)	Movistar Team	+ 1' 44"
9	Jon Barrenetxea (ESP)	Movistar Team	+ 2' 16"
10	Idar Andersen (NOR)	Uno-X Mobility	+ 2' 36"

=== Team classification ===
Final team classification (1–10)
Rank	Team	Time
1	(United Arab Emirates) UAE Team Emirates	50h 27' 05"
2	(Spain) Movistar Team	+ 30"
3	(Netherlands) Visma–Lease a Bike	+ 1' 33"
4	(France) Groupama–FDJ	+ 1' 57"
5	(United States) EF Education–EasyPost	+ 3' 14"
6	(Italy) Polti–Kometa	+ 3' 31"
7	Team Bahrain Victorious	+ 9' 48"
8	(France) Team TotalEnergies	+ 10' 40"
9	(Norway) Uno-X Mobility	+ 13' 08"
10	(Belgium) Lotto–Dstny	+ 13' 29"
