= Mattéo Vercher =

French bicycle racer

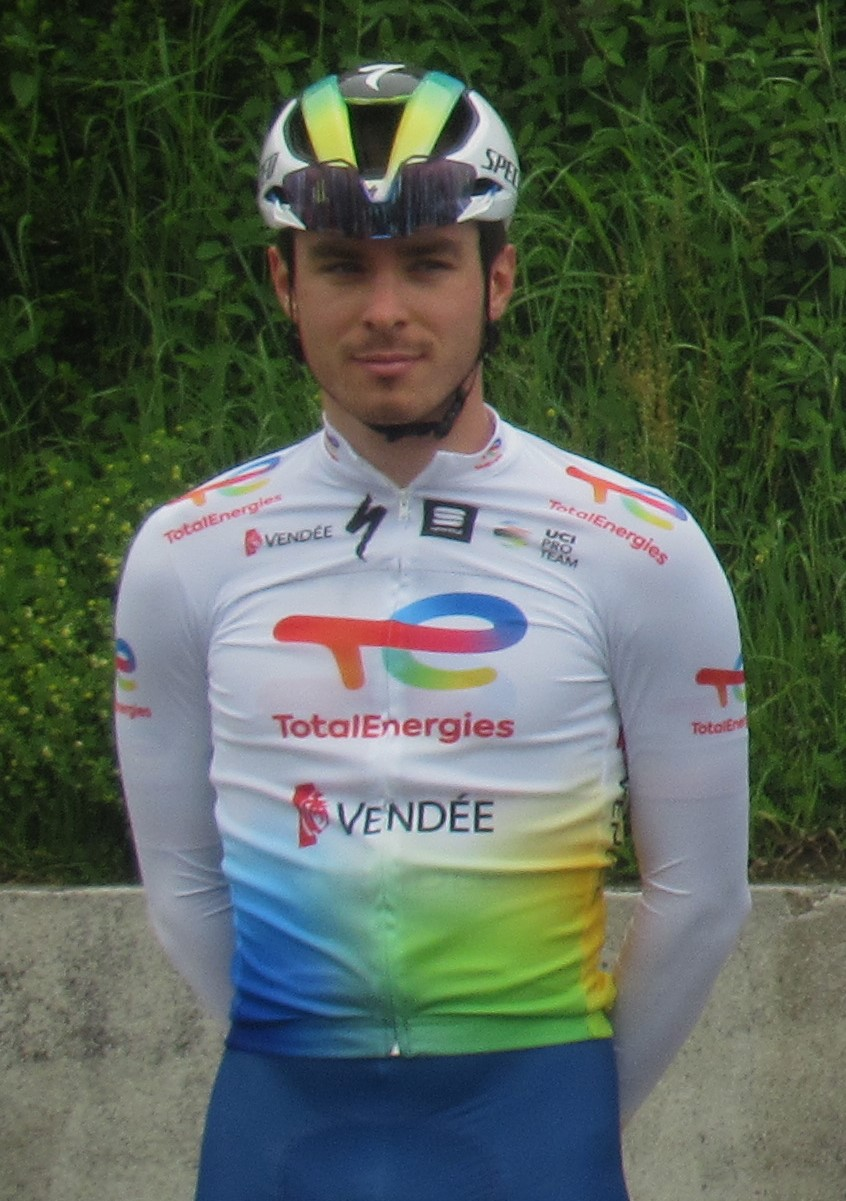

Personal information
- Born: 26 January 2001 (age 25) Lyon, France
- Height: 1.71 m (5 ft 7 in)

Cycling career
- Sport: Cycling
- Current team: Team TotalEnergies
- Disciplines: Road; Cyclo-cross
- Role: Rider

Amateur teams
- 2017: UC Belleville
- 2018–2019: Matériel-velo.com–VC Vaulx-en-Velin Junior
- 2020–2021: Matériel-velo.com–VC Vaulx-en-Velin
- 2021: Vendée U

Professional teams
- 2022: Team TotalEnergies (stagiaire)
- 2023–: Team TotalEnergies

Mattéo Vercher (born 26 January 2001) is a French cyclist, who currently rides for UCI ProTeam Team TotalEnergies.

== Major results ==
=== Road ===
2022
1st Road race, National Amateur Championships
1st Overall Trois Jours de Cherbourg

1st Young rider classification
1st Stage 2

1st Manche-Atlantique
1st Châtillon-Dijon
1st Jard-Les Herbiers
2nd Tour du Jura
3rd Giro del Veneto
10th Overall Tour du Pays de Montbéliard

1st Points classification

2024
1st Mountains classification, Tour des Alpes-Maritimes
7th GP Industria & Artigianato di Larciano
2025 (1 pro win)
1st Tour du Doubs
6th Overall Settimana Internazionale di Coppi e Bartali
8th Overall Tour de Kyushu
9th Trofeo Laigueglia
Tour de France

Combativity award Stages 1 & 8 Tour de France

2026
2nd Overall Tour de Luxembourg
3rd Overall Tour du Limousin
9th Trofeo Laigueglia
10th Ardèche Classic

==== Grand Tour general classification results timeline ====
| Grand Tour | 2024 |
|---|---|
| Giro d'Italia | — |
| Tour de France | 103 |
| Vuelta a España | — |

Legend
| — | Did not compete |
| DNF | Did not finish |

=== Cyclo-cross ===
2019–2020
1st Jablines Juniors
2020–2021
3rd Valencia
