= 2026 Giro dell'Emilia =

2026 UCI ProSeries

Race details
- Dates: 3 October 2026
- Stages: 1
- Distance: 197.9 km (123.0 mi)
- Winning time: 4h 33' 19"

Results
	Winner	Davide Piganzoli (ITA)	(Visma–Lease a Bike)
	Second	Tom Pidcock (GBR)	(Pinarello–Q36.5 Pro Cycling Team)
	Third	Oscar Onley (GBR)	(Netcompany INEOS)

The 2026 Giro dell'Emilia was the 109th edition of the Giro dell'Emilia road cycling one day race, which was held on 3 October 2026 as part of the 2026 UCI ProSeries calendar.

== Teams ==
Seventeen UCI WorldTeams, seven UCI ProTeams and one UCI Continental team made up the twenty-five teams that participated in the race.

UCI WorldTeams

- Alpecin–Premier Tech
- Decathlon CMA CGM
- EF Education–EasyPost
- Groupama–FDJ United
- Lidl–Trek
- Lotto–Intermarché
- Movistar Team
- Netcompany INEOS
- NSN Cycling Team
- Red Bull–Bora–Hansgrohe
- Soudal–Quick-Step
- Team Bahrain Victorious
- Team Jayco–AlUla
- UAE Team Emirates XRG
- Uno-X Mobility
- Visma–Lease a Bike
- XDS Astana Team

UCI ProTeams

- Bardiani–CSF 7 Saber
- Caja Rural–Seguros RGA
- MBH Bank CSB Telecom Fort
- Pinarello–Q36.5 Pro Cycling Team
- Solution Tech NIPPO Rali
- Team Polti VisitMalta
- Tudor Pro Cycling Team

UCI Continental Teams

- General Store–Essegibi–Fratelli Curia

== Results ==
Result
Rank	Rider	Team	Time
1	Davide Piganzoli (ITA)	Visma–Lease a Bike	4h 33' 19"
2	Tom Pidcock (GBR)	Pinarello–Q36.5 Pro Cycling Team	+ 2"
3	Oscar Onley (GBR)	Netcompany INEOS	+ 2"
4	Ben Tulett (GBR)	Visma–Lease a Bike	+ 5"
5	Matteo Jorgenson (USA)	Visma–Lease a Bike	+ 12"
6	Ben Healy (IRL)	EF Education–EasyPost	+ 22"
7	Lorenzo Fortunato (ITA)	XDS Astana Team	+ 29"
8	Adam Yates (GBR)	UAE Team Emirates XRG	+ 37"
9	Michael Storer (AUS)	Tudor Pro Cycling Team	+ 45"
10	Brandon McNulty (USA)	UAE Team Emirates XRG	+ 45"
