= 2009 Tour de Wallonie =

Race details
- Dates: 25–29 July 2009
- Stages: 5
- Distance: 961.7 km (597.6 mi)
- Winning time: 23h 04' 10"

Results
	Winner	Julien El Fares (FRA)
	Second	Pavel Brutt (RUS)
	Third	Alexandr Kolobnev (RUS)

The 2009 Tour de Wallonie was the 36th edition of the Tour de Wallonie cycle race and was held from 25 to 29 July 2009. The race started in Waremme and finished in Tournai. The race was won by Julien El Fares.

== General classification ==
Final general classification

Rank	Rider	Time
1	Julien El Fares (FRA)	23h 04' 10"
2	Pavel Brutt (RUS)	+ 31"
3	Alexandr Kolobnev (RUS)	+ 49"
4	Mathieu Ladagnous (FRA)	+ 58"
5	Yoann Offredo (FRA)	+ 1' 24"
6	Nicolas Jalabert (FRA)	+ 1' 24"
7	Dries Devenyns (BEL)	+ 1' 24"
8	Mathias Frank (SUI)	+ 1' 24"
9	Vincent Jérôme (FRA)	+ 1' 26"
10	Thomas De Gendt (BEL)	+ 1' 26"
