= Igor Arrieta =

Spanish cyclist

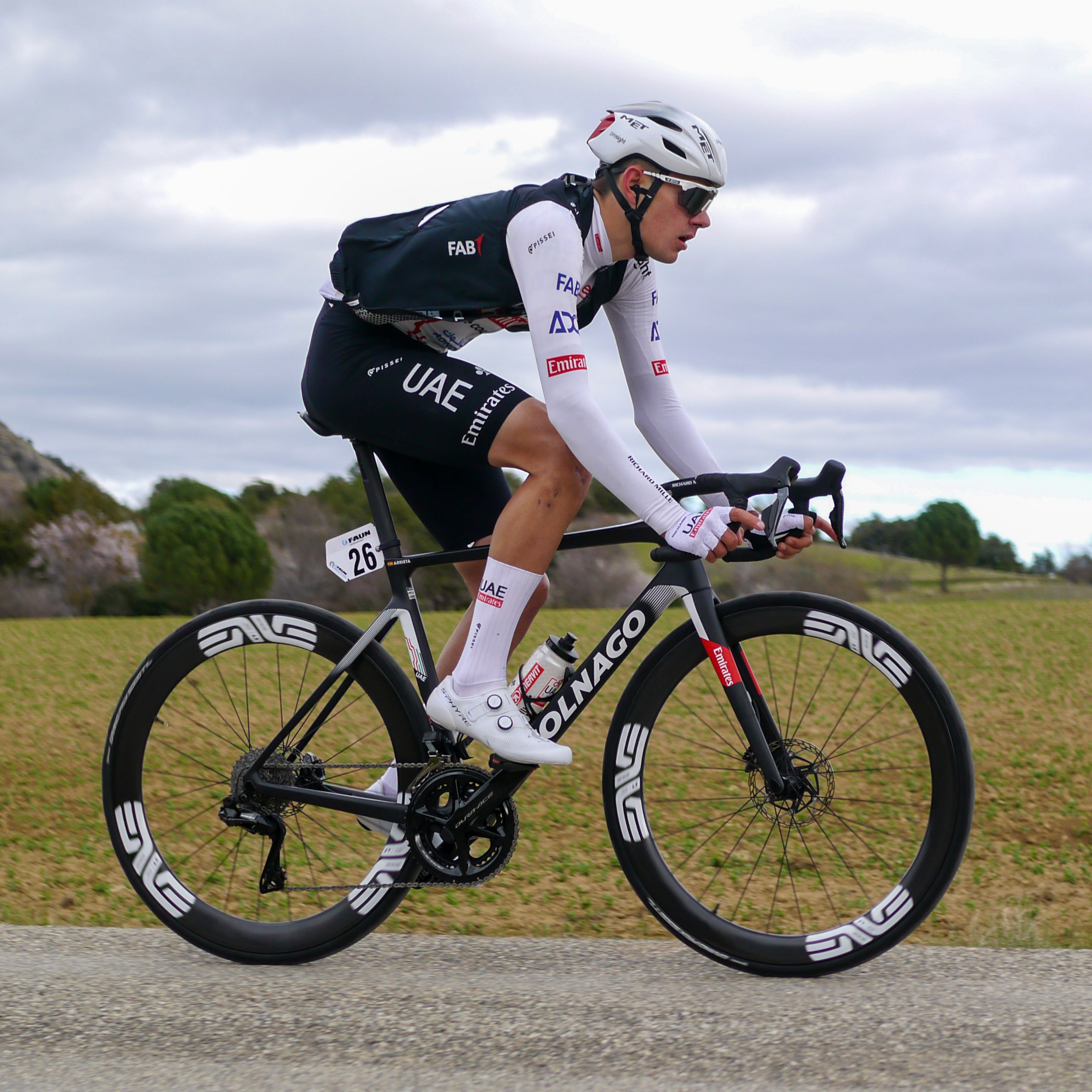
- Arrieta in 2024

Personal information
- Full name: Igor Arrieta Lizarraga
- Born: 8 December 2002 (age 23) Uharte-Arakil, Spain
- Height: 1.82 m (6 ft 0 in)
- Weight: 64 kg (141 lb)

Cycling career
- Sport: Cycling
- Current team: UAE Team Emirates
- Disciplines: Road; Cyclo-cross
- Role: Rider
- Rider type: Climber

Amateur team
- 2021: Lizarte

Professional teams
- 2021–2023: Equipo Kern Pharma
- 2024–: UAE Team Emirates

Major wins
- Grand Tours Giro d'Italia 1 individual stage (2026)

Igor Arrieta Lizarraga (born 8 December 2002) is a Spanish cyclist who currently rides for UCI WorldTeam UAE Team Emirates. He is the son of former professional cyclist José Luis Arrieta.

Arrieta turned professional in August 2021 with UCI ProTeam Equipo Kern Pharma after winning the national under-23 time trial championships earlier that year. In February 2022, he won the young rider classification and finished 7th overall at the O Gran Camiño.

He joined UCI WorldTeam LIDL TREK in 2027 on a three-year contract.

== Major results ==
=== Road ===
2019
National Junior Championships

2nd Road race
2nd Time trial

8th Gipuzkoa Klasika
10th Gent–Wevelgem Juniors
2020
2nd Time trial, National Junior Championships
5th Gipuzkoa Klasika
10th Time trial, UEC European Junior Championships
2021
1st Time trial, National Under-23 Championships
1st Overall Volta a Castelló

1st Stages 2 & 3

2nd Memorial Valenciaga
3rd Santikutz Klasika
2022
6th Overall Vuelta a Asturias
7th Overall O Gran Camiño

1st Young rider classification

2023
8th Tour du Jura
2024
9th Trofeo Serra de Tramuntana
10th Road race, UCI World Under-23 Championships
10th Ardèche Classic
2025 (1 pro win)
1st Prueba Villafranca de Ordizia
3rd Overall Settimana Internazionale di Coppi e Bartali

1st Young rider classification

2026 (1)
1st Stage 5 Giro d'Italia
3rd Overall AlUla Tour
5th Road race, National Championships
5th Overall Tour de Luxembourg
7th Clásica Jaén Paraíso Interior
8th Overall Tour of the Basque Country
9th Ardèche Classic

=== Cyclo-cross ===
2018–2019
3rd Junior Vic Junior
3rd Junior Manlleu
2019–2020
1st National Junior Championships
1st Junior Igorre
1st Junior Karrantza
1st Junior Valencia
1st Junior Xativa
1st Junior Pontevedra
1st Junior Trofeo San Andres
