= Davide Piganzoli =

Italian racing cyclist (born 2002)

Personal information
- Born: 8 July 2002 (age 24) Morbegno, Italy
- Height: 1.74 m (5 ft 9 in)
- Weight: 61 kg (134 lb)

Cycling career
- Sport: Cycling
- Current team: Visma–Lease a Bike
- Discipline: Road
- Role: Rider

Amateur teams
- 2010–2016: Pedale Morbegnese
- 2017–2020: Ciclistica Trevigliese
- 2021–2022: Kometa U23

Professional teams
- 2021: Eolo–Kometa (stagiaire)
- 2023–2025: Eolo–Kometa
- 2026–: Visma–Lease a Bike

Major wins
- Grand Tours Tour de France 1 TTT stage (2026) Stage races Tour de Luxembourg (2026) One-day races and Classics Giro dell'Emilia (2026)

Davide Piganzoli (born 8 July 2002) is an Italian cyclist who currently rides for UCI WorldTeam Visma–Lease a Bike. He rode his first Grand Tour in 2024, riding in the 2024 Giro d'Italia. Team Visma signed Piganzoli in September 2025. He finished eighth in the 2026 Giro d'Italia riding for Team Visma in support of overall Visma team leader Jonas Vingegaard.

== Major results ==
2020
3rd Time trial, National Junior Road Championships
2021
3rd Time trial, National Under-23 Road Championships
10th Overall Giro Ciclistico d'Italia
2022
1st Time trial, National Under-23 Road Championships
1st Overall Vuelta al Bidasoa
2nd La Maurienne
2nd Santikutz Klasika
2nd Memorial Valenciaga
5th Overall Tour de l'Avenir
7th Trofeo Piva
9th Overall Grand Prix Jeseníky
10th Overall Giro d'Italia Giovani Under 23
2023
2nd Overall Orlen Nations Grand Prix
3rd Overall Tour de l'Avenir
6th Overall Istrian Spring Trophy
9th Overall Tour de Hongrie
2024 (2 pro wins)
1st Overall Tour of Antalya

1st Mountains classification
1st Stage 3

3rd Giro dell'Emilia
7th Memorial Marco Pantani
9th Overall Tour de Luxembourg
10th Overall Tour of the Alps
2025
2nd Overall Route d'Occitanie

1st Young rider classification

2nd Overall O Gran Camiño
3rd GP Industria & Artigianato di Larciano
8th Giro della Toscana
8th Memorial Marco Pantani
10th Coppa Sabatini
10th Clàssica Comunitat Valenciana 1969
2026 (5)
1st Overall Tour de Luxembourg

1st Young rider classification
1st Stage 4 (ITT)

1st Overall Route d'Occitanie

1st Young rider classification
1st Stage 3

1st Giro dell'Emilia
1st Stage 1 (TTT) Tour de France
6th Ardèche Classic
8th Overall Giro d'Italia

=== Grand Tour general classification results timeline ===
Grand Tour	2024	2025	2026
Giro d'Italia	13	14	8
Tour de France	—	—	14
Vuelta a España	—	—	
