= 2026 Ardèche Classic =

2026 Faun-Ardèche Classic
2026 UCI ProSeries

Race details
- Dates: 28 February 2026
- Stages: 1
- Distance: 187.6 km (116.6 mi)
- Winning time: 4h 37' 22"

Results
	Winner	Paul Seixas (FRA)	(Decathlon CMA CGM)
	Second	Jan Christen (SUI)	(UAE Team Emirates XRG)
	Third	Lenny Martinez (FRA)	(Team Bahrain Victorious)

The 2026 Faun-Ardèche Classic was the 26th edition of the Classic Sud-Ardèche cycle race. It was held on 28 February 2026 as a category 1.Pro race on the 2026 UCI ProSeries calendar. The race started and finished in Guilherand-Granges.

== Teams ==
Twenty-one teams of up to seven riders participated in the race, which included twelve UCI WorldTeams, six UCI ProTeams, and three UCI Continental teams.

UCI WorldTeams

- Decathlon CMA CGM
- EF Education–EasyPost
- Groupama–FDJ United
- INEOS Grenadiers
- Lidl–Trek
- Lotto–Intermarché
- Movistar Team
- Team Bahrain Victorious
- Team Picnic–PostNL
- UAE Team Emirates XRG
- Visma–Lease a Bike
- XDS Astana Team

UCI ProTeams

- Caja Rural–Seguros RGA
- Cofidis
- Pinarello–Q36.5 Pro Cycling Team
- Team TotalEnergies
- Tudor Pro Cycling Team
- Unibet Rose Rockets

UCI Continental Teams

- CIC Pro Cycling Academy
- Nice Métropole Côte d'Azur
- Van Rysel–Roubaix

== Result ==
Result
Rank	Rider	Team	Time
1	Paul Seixas (FRA)	Decathlon CMA CGM	4h 37' 22"
2	Jan Christen (SUI)	UAE Team Emirates XRG	+ 1' 48"
3	Lenny Martinez (FRA)	Team Bahrain Victorious	+ 1' 48"
4	Matteo Jorgenson (USA)	Visma–Lease a Bike	+ 1' 48"
5	Mattias Skjelmose (DEN)	Lidl–Trek	+ 2' 07"
6	Davide Piganzoli (ITA)	Visma–Lease a Bike	+ 2' 18"
7	Egan Bernal (COL)	INEOS Grenadiers	+ 2' 34"
8	Jefferson Alveiro Cepeda (ECU)	Movistar Team	+ 3' 46"
9	Igor Arrieta (ESP)	UAE Team Emirates XRG	+ 4' 16"
10	Mattéo Vercher (FRA)	Team TotalEnergies	+ 4' 21"
