= Aurélien Paret-Peintre =

French cyclist

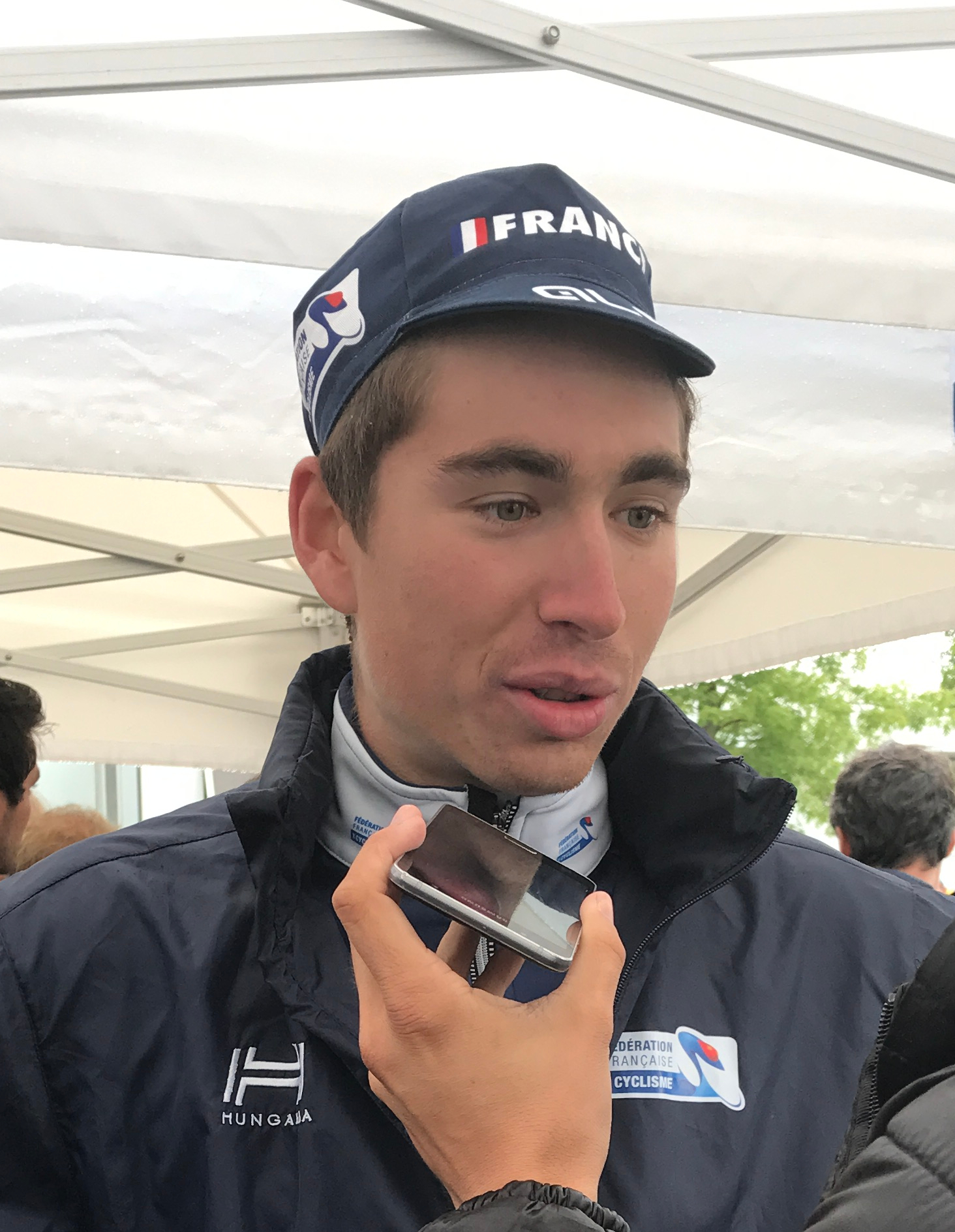
- Paret-Peintre in 2017.

Personal information
- Born: 27 February 1996 (age 30) Annemasse, France
- Height: 1.85 m (6 ft 1 in)
- Weight: 64 kg (141 lb)

Cycling career
- Sport: Cycling
- Current team: Decathlon CMA CGM Team
- Discipline: Road
- Role: Rider
- Rider type: Climber

Amateur teams
- 2013–2014: VC Annemasse Junior
- 2015–2018: Chambéry CF

Professional team
- 2018–: AG2R La Mondiale

Major wins
- Grand Tours Giro d'Italia 1 individual stage (2023)

Aurélien Paret-Peintre (French pronunciation: [ɔʁeljɛ̃ paʁɛ pɛ̃tʁ]; born 27 February 1996 in Annemasse) is a French cyclist, who currently rides for UCI WorldTeam Decathlon CMA CGM Team. Professional since 2018, he has most notably won the fourth stage of the 2023 Giro d'Italia from the breakaway. His first professional win was the 2021 Grand Prix La Marseillaise. His younger brother Valentin is also a professional cyclist.

== Major results ==
2013
1st Overall Giro di Basilicata

1st Points classification
1st Stage 1

2014
1st Overall Tour of Istria

1st Stage 1

2015
4th Road race, National Under-23 Road Championships
4th Overall Kreiz Breizh Elites
6th Overall Ronde de l'Isard
2016
8th Liège–Bastogne–Liège Espoirs
2017
4th Piccolo Giro di Lombardia
5th Trofeo Edil C
10th Liège–Bastogne–Liège Espoirs
2018
2nd Overall Ronde de l'Isard
7th Overall Grand Prix Priessnitz spa
2019
4th Boucles de l'Aulne
5th Polynormande
10th Overall Tour de Wallonie
2020
3rd Tour du Doubs
6th Overall Étoile de Bessèges
10th Overall Tour de Luxembourg
2021 (1 pro win)
1st Grand Prix La Marseillaise
2nd Mercan'Tour Classic Alpes-Maritimes
7th Ardèche Classic
9th Overall Paris–Nice
10th Overall Tour Poitou-Charentes en Nouvelle-Aquitaine
10th Tre Valli Varesine
2022
8th Overall Tour de la Provence
10th Overall Paris–Nice
10th Overall Tour Poitou-Charentes en Nouvelle-Aquitaine
2023 (2)
1st Stage 4 Giro d'Italia
2nd Overall Tour des Alpes-Maritimes et du Var

1st Stage 3

2024 (1)
1st Stage 5 Tour of the Alps
3rd Overall Tour des Alpes-Maritimes
5th Liège–Bastogne–Liège
5th Classic Var
6th Overall Étoile de Bessèges
7th Coppa Agostoni
9th Ardèche Classic
2025
2nd Vuelta a Murcia
5th Overall Tour of Britain
7th Overall Tour Poitou-Charentes en Nouvelle-Aquitaine
8th Overall Tour de Luxembourg
8th Overall Tour des Alpes-Maritimes
2026
4th Overall Tour de la Provence
4th Overall Tour de Luxembourg

=== Grand Tour general classification results timeline ===
| Grand Tour | 2020 | 2021 | 2022 | 2023 | 2024 | 2025 |
|---|---|---|---|---|---|---|
| Giro d'Italia | 16 | — | — | 15 | 26 | — |
| Tour de France | — | 15 | DNF | 55 | — | 25 |
| Vuelta a España | — | — | — | — | — | |

Legend
| — | Did not compete |
| DNF | Did not finish |
