= 2021 Grand Prix La Marseillaise =

2021 UCI Europe Tour

Race details
- Dates: 31 January 2021
- Stages: 1
- Distance: 171 km (106.3 mi)
- Winning time: 4h 24' 29"

Results
	Winner	Aurélien Paret-Peintre (FRA)	(AG2R Citroën Team)
	Second	Thomas Boudat (FRA)	(Arkéa–Samsic)
	Third	Bryan Coquard (FRA)	(B&B Hotels p/b KTM)

The 2021 Grand Prix La Marseillaise was the 42nd edition of the Grand Prix La Marseillaise cycle race. It was held on 31 January 2021 as a category 1.1 race on the 2021 UCI Europe Tour and the first event of the 2021 French Road Cycling Cup. The 171-kilometer route started and finished in Marseille and featured several climbs, notably the Route des Crêtes and the Col de la Gineste in the last 30 kilometers.

Defending champion Benoît Cosnefroy of AG2R Citroën Team suffered a knee injury in training in mid-January and was forced to miss the race, but his teammate and French compatriot Aurélien Paret-Peintre won the race. The peloton was reduced to a small group of around 30 riders at the finish, and in the ensuing bunch sprint, Paret-Peintre, not generally known for his sprinting prowess, narrowly beat sprinters Thomas Boudat and Bryan Coquard in a photo finish.

== Teams ==
Seven UCI WorldTeams, eight UCI ProTeams, and two UCI Continental teams make up the seventeen teams that were invited to the race. Each team entered with seven riders, making up a 119-rider peloton. Of these riders, there were 110 finishers. Four riders finished over the time limit, while a further four did not finish the race. The only non-starter, Jonas Rutsch of EF Education–Nippo, was a late scratch after receiving a positive result from a routine COVID-19 test.

UCI WorldTeams

- AG2R Citroën Team
- Cofidis
- EF Education–Nippo
- Groupama–FDJ
- Intermarché–Wanty–Gobert Matériaux
- Lotto–Soudal
- UAE Team Emirates

UCI ProTeams

- Arkéa–Samsic
- B&B Hotels p/b KTM
- Bingoal WB
- Caja Rural–Seguros RGA
- Delko
- Equipo Kern Pharma
- Sport Vlaanderen–Baloise
- Total Direct Énergie

UCI Continental Teams

- St. Michel–Auber93
- Xelliss–Roubaix–Lille Métropole

== Result ==
Result
Rank	Rider	Team	Time
1	Aurélien Paret-Peintre (FRA)	AG2R Citroën Team	4h 24' 29"
2	Thomas Boudat (FRA)	Arkéa–Samsic	+ 0"
3	Bryan Coquard (FRA)	B&B Hotels p/b KTM	+ 0"
4	Kiko Galván (ESP)	Equipo Kern Pharma	+ 0"
5	Arjen Livyns (BEL)	Bingoal WB	+ 0"
6	Tim Wellens (BEL)	Lotto–Soudal	+ 0"
7	Matteo Trentin (ITA)	UAE Team Emirates	+ 0"
8	Lilian Calmejane (FRA)	AG2R Citroën Team	+ 0"
9	Julien El Fares (FRA)	EF Education–Nippo	+ 0"
10	Odd Christian Eiking (NOR)	Intermarché–Wanty–Gobert Matériaux	+ 0"
