= Pepijn Reinderink =

Dutch cyclist (born 2002)

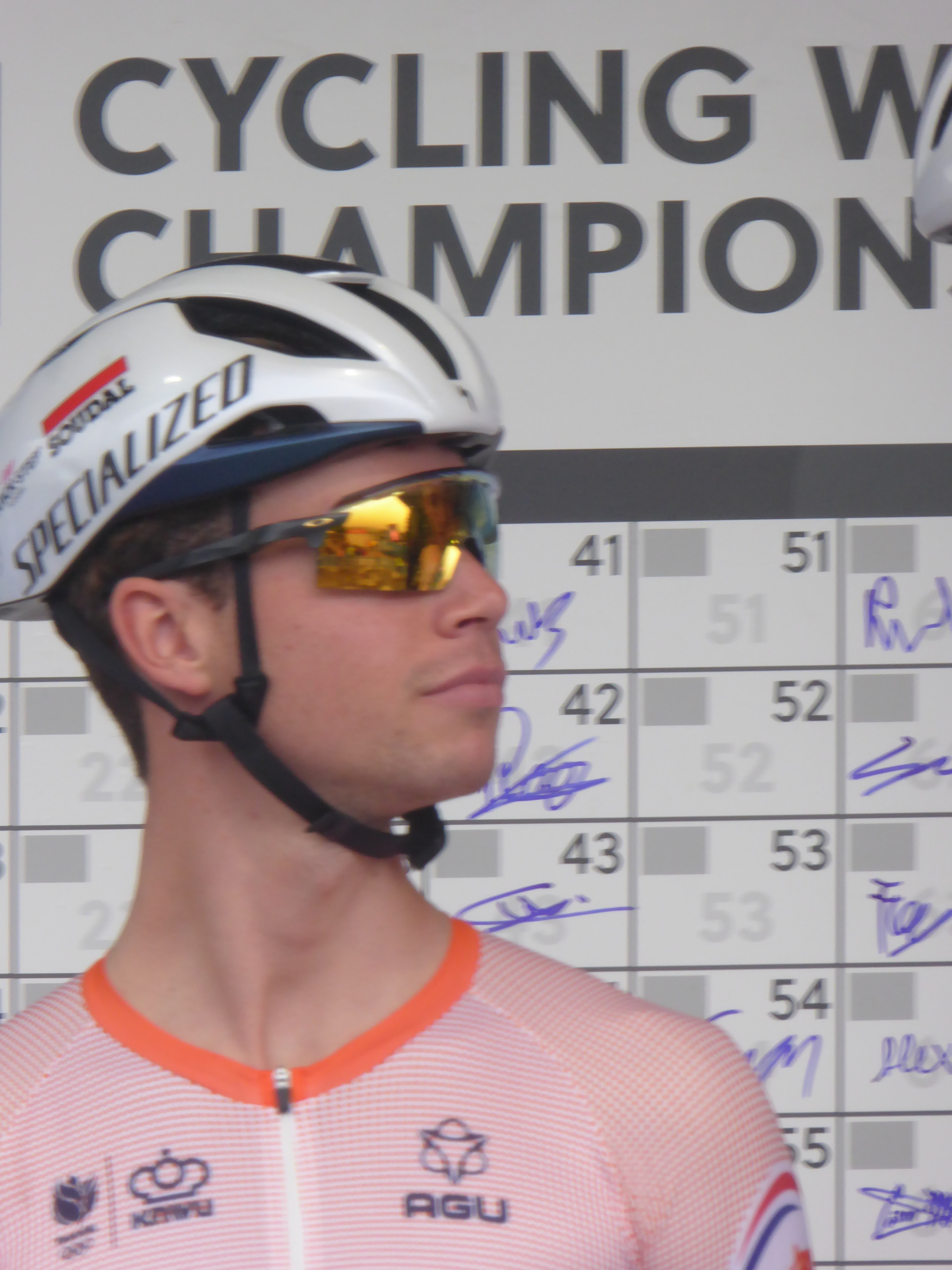
- Reinderink in 2023

Personal information
- Born: 4 May 2002 (age 24) Almelo, Netherlands
- Height: 1.81 m (5 ft 11 in)
- Weight: 67 kg (148 lb)

Cycling career
- Sport: Cycling
- Current team: Soudal–Quick-Step
- Discipline: Road
- Role: Rider

Amateur teams
- 2019: Acrog–Pauwels Sauzen–Balen BC
- 2020: Acrog–Tormans BC U19
- 2021–2022: Development Team DSM

Professional teams
- 2023: Soudal–Quick-Step Devo Team
- 2024–: Soudal–Quick-Step

Pepijn Reinderink (born 4 May 2002) is a Dutch cyclist, who currently rides for UCI WorldTeam Soudal–Quick-Step.

== Career ==
Reinderink rode as a junior for the Belgian Royal Balen BC team. He also spent for two seasons with Development Team DSM–Firmenich and made his professional debut for Team DSM at the 2022 Tour of the Alps. Ahead of the 2023 season he signed for the Soudal–Quick-Step Devo Team.

In 2023, he won the Dutch under-23 road race title in Sittard with a solo breakaway. He won the opening stage, the youth jersey and the mountain jersey, and finished third in the final overall classification of the Triptyque Ardennais. He rode to two top 10 finishes in the Giro Next Gen. He was also third in the Wim Hendriks Trophy and the Hel van Voerendaal. He raced at the 2023 U23 European Championships and 2023 UCI World Championships. He was promoted to UCI WorldTeam Soudal–Quick-Step for the 2024 season on a two-year contract.

== Personal life ==
Born in Almelo, his brother Joris rode with him for Development Team DSM in 2022. He played football as a youngster in his home town of Ruurlo for VV Ruurlo, but started cycling aged 12 years-old with RTC de Stofwolk in Eibergen.

== Major results ==
2019
1st Stage 1 Tour du Valromey
3rd La Philippe Gilbert Juniors
5th Overall Oberösterreich Juniorenrundfahrt
2020
2nd Kuurne–Brussels–Kuurne Juniors
2022
10th Flèche Ardennaise
2023
1st Road race, National Under-23 Road Championships
3rd Overall Triptyque Ardennais

1st Mountains classification
1st Young rider classification
1st Stage 1

3rd Wim Hendriks Trofee
3rd Hel van Voerendaal
2024
1st Mountains classification, Tour of Guangxi
1st Mountains classification, Tour de Luxembourg
2026 (1 pro win)
6th Coppa Bernocchi
9th Overall Tour de Luxembourg

1st Stage 3

10th Coppa Agostoni
