= Tour de Luxembourg =

Luxembourgish multi-day road cycling race

Race details
- Date: Early June (until 2019); September (since 2020)
- Region: Luxembourg
- English name: Tour of Luxembourg
- Discipline: Road
- Competition: UCI ProSeries
- Type: Stage-race
- Web site: www.skodatour.lu

History
- First edition: 1935
- Editions: 86 (as of 2026)
- First winner: Mathias Clemens (LUX)
- Most wins: Mathias Clemens (LUX) (5 wins)
- Most recent: Davide Piganzoli (ITA)

The Tour de Luxembourg is an annual stage race in professional road bicycle racing held in Luxembourg. The Tour de Luxembourg is classified as a 2.Pro race, the highest rating below the World Tour, by the Union Cycliste Internationale (UCI), the sport's governing body. In 2006, the Tour became part of the UCI Europe Tour, and became part of the UCI ProSeries in 2020. Primarily held in late May to early June, the event was sometimes used by riders as a preparation race for the Tour de France.

In his 2021 autobiography Væddeløber, the 2014 winner Matti Breschel revealed that his victory was partially facilitated by offering riders of another team €1000 each if they succeeding in keeping contact with the breakaway.

== Winners ==
| Year | Country | Rider | Team |
|---|---|---|---|
| 1935 | Luxembourg | Mathias Clemens | |
| 1936 | Luxembourg | Mathias Clemens | |
| 1937 | Luxembourg | Mathias Clemens | |
| 1938 | Belgium | Lucien Vlaemynck | |
| 1939 | Luxembourg | Mathias Clemens | |
| 1940 | No race due to World War II | | |
| 1941 | Luxembourg | Christophe Didier | |
| 1942 | Luxembourg | François Neuens | |
| 1943 | Luxembourg | François Neuens | |
| 1944 | No race due to World War II | | |
| 1945 | Luxembourg | Jean Goldschmit | |
| 1946 | Belgium | Briek Schotte | |
| 1947 | Luxembourg | Mathias Clemens | |
| 1948 | Luxembourg | Jean Goldschmit | |
| 1949 | Luxembourg | Bim Diederich | |
| 1950 | Belgium | Isidoor De Ryck | |
| 1951 | Luxembourg | Marcel Ernzer | |
| 1952 | Luxembourg | Jeng Kirchen | |
| 1953 | Belgium | Robert Vanderstockt | |
| 1954 | Luxembourg | Jean-Pierre Schmitz | |
| 1955 | France | Louison Bobet | |
| 1956 | Luxembourg | Charly Gaul | |
| 1957 | France | Gérard Saint | |
| 1958 | Luxembourg | Jean-Pierre Schmitz | |
| 1959 | Luxembourg | Charly Gaul | |
| 1960 | Luxembourg | Marcel Ernzer | |
| 1961 | Luxembourg | Charly Gaul | |
| 1962 | Belgium | Jef Planckaert | |
| 1963 | Belgium | Yvo Molenaers | |
| 1964 | Netherlands | Arie den Hartog | |
| 1965 | Great Britain | Vin Denson | |
| 1966 | Luxembourg | Edy Schütz | |
| 1967 | Belgium | Frans Brands | |
| 1968 | Luxembourg | Edy Schütz | |
| 1969 | Italy | Davide Boifava | |
| 1970 | Luxembourg | Edy Schütz | |
| 1971 | Belgium | André Dierickx | |
| 1972 | Belgium | Roger Rosiers | |
| 1973 | France | Sylvain Vasseur | |
| 1974 | Belgium | Freddy Maertens | |
| 1975 | Belgium | Frans Verbeeck | |
| 1976 | Belgium | Frans Verbeeck | |
| 1977 | Netherlands | Bert Pronk | |
| 1978 | Belgium | Ludo Peeters | |
| 1979 | Luxembourg | Lucien Didier | |
| 1980 | Netherlands | Bert Oosterbosch | |
| 1981 | Soviet Union | Yuri Barinov | |
| 1982 | France | Bernard Hinault | |
| 1983 | Luxembourg | Lucien Didier | |
| 1984 | France | Christophe Lavainne | |
| 1985 | Netherlands | Jelle Nijdam | |
| 1986 | Netherlands | Steven Rooks | |
| 1987 | Denmark | Søren Lilholt | |
| 1988 | Switzerland | Richard Trinkler | |
| 1989 | Netherlands | Michel Cornelisse | |
| 1990 | France | Christophe Lavainne | |
| 1991 | Netherlands | Gert-Jan Theunisse | |
| 1992 | France | Jean-Philippe Dojwa | |
| 1993 | Italy | Max Sciandri | |
| 1994 | Netherlands | Frans Maassen | |
| 1995 | Switzerland | Rolf Järmann | |
| 1996 | Italy | Alberto Elli | |
| 1997 | Belgium | Frank Vandenbroucke | |
| 1998 | United States | Lance Armstrong | U.S. Postal Service |
| 1999 | Belgium | Marc Wauters | Rabobank |
| 2000 | Italy | Alberto Elli | Team Telekom |
| 2001 | Denmark | Jørgen Bo Petersen | Team Fakta |
| 2002 | Sweden | Marcus Ljungqvist | EDS–Fakta |
| 2003 | France | Thomas Voeckler | Brioches La Boulangère |
| 2004 | Belgium | Maxime Monfort | Landbouwkrediet–Colnago |
| 2005 | Hungary | László Bodrogi | Crédit Agricole |
| 2006 | United States | Christian Vande Velde | Team CSC |
| 2007 | Switzerland | Grégory Rast | Astana |
| 2008 | Netherlands | Joost Posthuma | Rabobank |
| 2009 | Luxembourg | Fränk Schleck | Team Saxo Bank |
| 2010 | Italy | Matteo Carrara | Vacansoleil |
| 2011 | Germany | Linus Gerdemann | Leopard Trek |
| 2012 | Denmark | Jakob Fuglsang | RadioShack–Nissan |
| 2013 | Germany | Paul Martens | Blanco Pro Cycling |
| 2014 | Denmark | Matti Breschel | Tinkoff–Saxo |
| 2015 | Germany | Linus Gerdemann | Cult Energy Pro Cycling |
| 2016 | Netherlands | Maurits Lammertink | Roompot–Oranje Peloton |
| 2017 | Belgium | Greg Van Avermaet | BMC Racing Team |
| 2018 | Italy | Andrea Pasqualon | Wanty–Groupe Gobert |
| 2019 | Spain | Jesús Herrada | Cofidis |
| 2020 | Italy | Diego Ulissi | UAE Team Emirates |
| 2021 | Portugal | João Almeida | Deceuninck–Quick-Step |
| 2022 | Denmark | Mattias Skjelmose | Trek–Segafredo |
| 2023 | Switzerland | Marc Hirschi | UAE Team Emirates |
| 2024 | Italy | Antonio Tiberi | Team Bahrain Victorious |
| 2025 | United States | Brandon McNulty | UAE Team Emirates XRG |
| 2026 | Italy | Davide Piganzoli | Visma–Lease a Bike |
