= Mathieu Kockelmann =

Luxembourgish cyclist (born 2004)

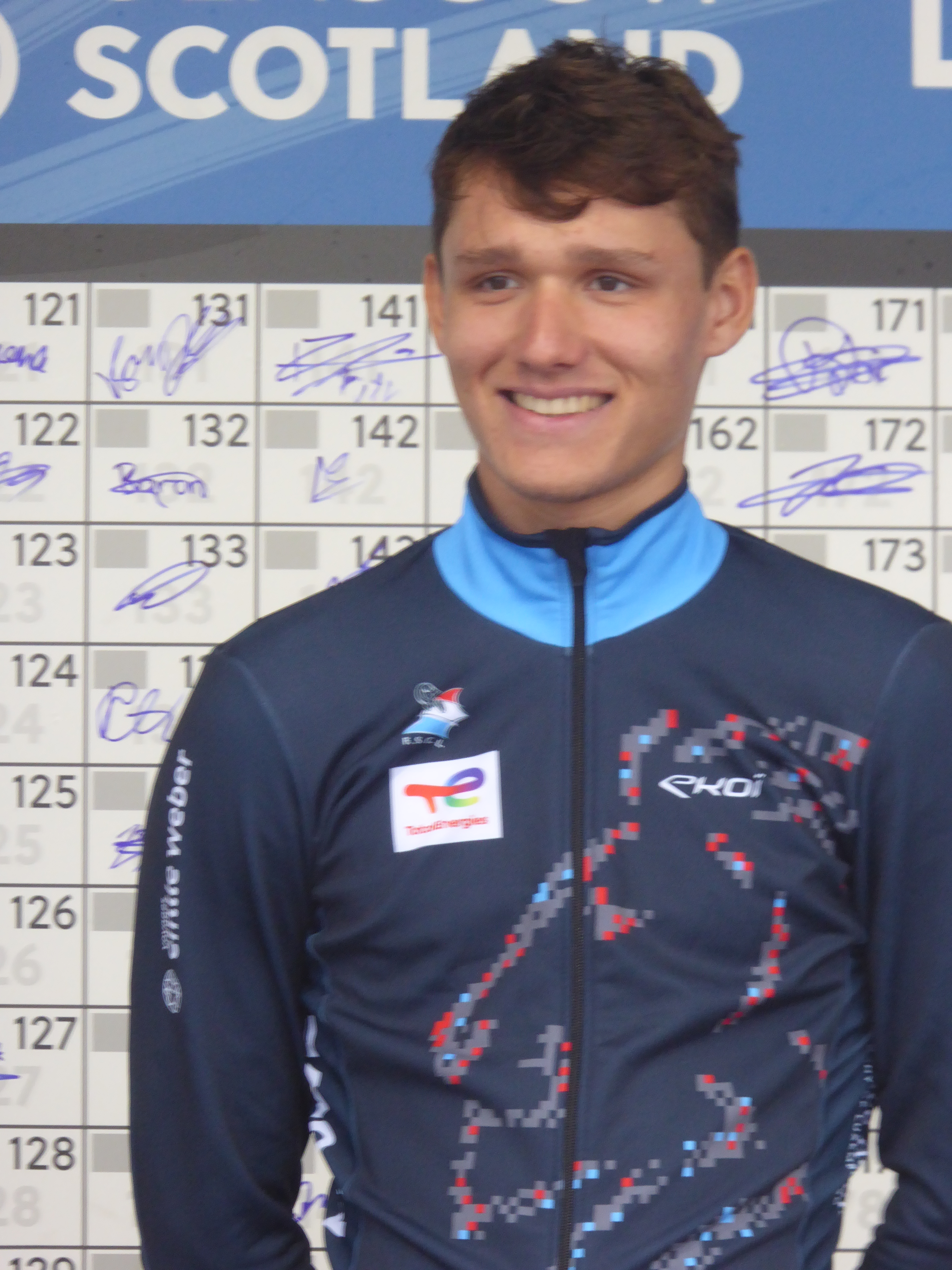
- Kockelmann in 2023

Personal information
- Born: 31 January 2004 (age 22) Schouweiler, Luxembourg
- Height: 1.83 m (6 ft 0 in)
- Weight: 70 kg (154 lb)

Cycling career
- Sport: Cycling
- Current team: Lotto–Intermarché
- Discipline: Road
- Role: Rider

Amateur teams
- 2021: Crabbé Toitures–CC Chevigny Junior
- 2022: Team Auto Eder

Professional teams
- 2023–2024: Team Lotto–Kern Haus
- 2025: Lotto Development Team
- 2026–: Lotto–Intermarché
Medal record
Men's road cycling
Representing Luxembourg
European Championships
Gold medal – first place	2022 Anadia	Junior time trial

Mathieu Kockelmann (born 31 January 2004) is a Luxembourgish professional cyclist, who currently rides for UCI WorldTeam Lotto–Intermarché.

He took his first professional win in September 2025, winning from a bunch sprint on stage two of the Tour de Luxembourg.

== Major results ==
2021
1st Road race, National Junior Road Championships
6th Grand Prix Bob Jungels
2022
1st Time trial, UEC European Junior Championships
National Junior Road Championships

1st Time trial
2nd Road race

1st Overall Saarland Trofeo

1st Stage 3b

4th Overall Course de la Paix Juniors

1st Points classification
1st Stages 1 & 2a (ITT)

5th Overall Grand Prix Rüebliland

1st Points classification
1st Stage 2b

6th Gent–Wevelgem Junioren
6th Giro di Primavera
10th Trofeo Comune di Vertova
2023
National Under-23 Road Championships

1st Time trial
2nd Road race

2024
1st Stage 3 Orlen Nations Grand Prix
2nd Time trial, National Under-23 Road Championships
4th Road race, National Road Championships
2025 (1 pro win)
1st Time trial, National Under-23 Road Championships
1st Stage 2 Tour de Luxembourg
1st Stage 4 Tour de l'Avenir
1st Stage 3 Ronde van Vlaams-Brabant
9th Boucle de l'Artois
2026 (1)
7th Overall Étoile de Bessèges

1st Stage 2
