= Tijmen Graat =

Dutch cyclist (born 2003)

Personal information
- Born: 10 January 2003 (age 23) Boxmeer, Netherlands
- Height: 1.76 m (5 ft 9 in)

Cycling career
- Sport: Cycling
- Current team: Visma–Lease a Bike
- Discipline: Road
- Role: Rider

Amateur teams
- 2019: TWC Noord-Limburg
- 2020: Cycling Team Limburg
- 2021: Streetjump–Forte Development

Professional teams
- 2022–2024: Jumbo–Visma Development Team
- 2025–: Visma–Lease a Bike

Tijmen Graat (born 10 January 2003) is a Dutch professional racing cyclist, who rides for UCI WorldTeam Visma–Lease a Bike.

== Major results ==
2022
1st Stage 2a (TTT) Ronde de l'Isard
2023
1st Overall Istrian Spring Trophy

1st Stage 2

1st G.P. Palio del Recioto
2nd Coppa Città di San Daniele
4th Giro del Belvedere
5th Overall Czech Tour

1st Young rider classification

5th Piccolo Giro di Lombardia
9th Overall Giro Next Gen
2024
3rd Overall Tour de l'Avenir

1st Mountains classification

3rd Overall Circuit des Ardennes
6th Liège–Bastogne–Liège Espoirs
2025
9th Overall Okolo Slovenska
10th Overall Czech Tour
2026
6th Overall Tour de Luxembourg
