= Thomas Gachignard =

French cyclist (born 2000)

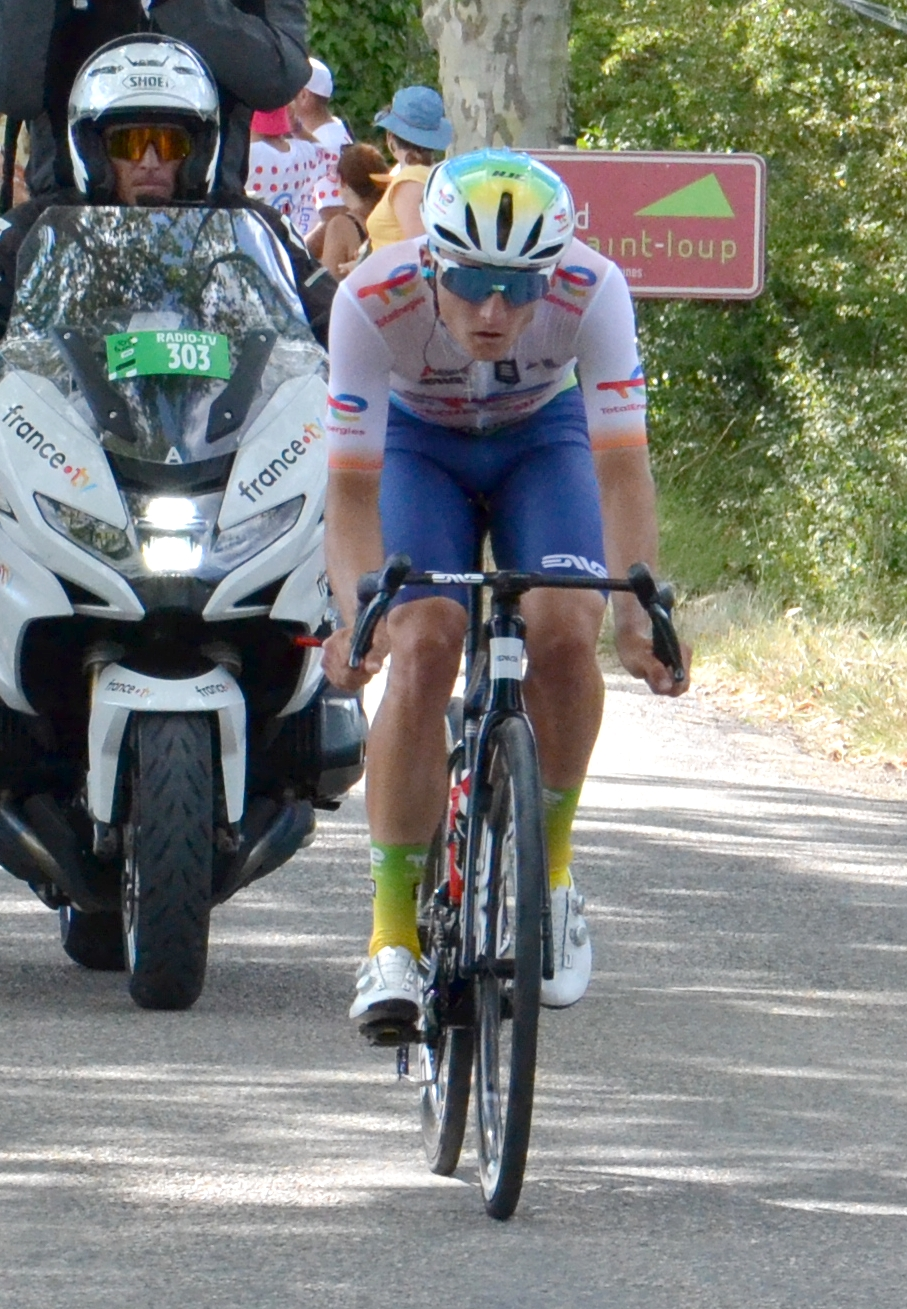
- Gachignard at the 2024 Tour de France

Personal information
- Born: 17 August 2000 (age 26) Niort, France

Cycling career
- Sport: Cycling
- Current team: Team TotalEnergies
- Disciplines: Road; Cyclo-cross
- Role: Rider

Amateur teams
- 2020: Océane Top 16
- 2021: Dinan Sport Cycling
- 2022: Sojasun Espoir–ACNC

Professional teams
- 2021: Swiss Racing Academy (stagiaire)
- 2022: St. Michel–Auber93 (stagiaire)
- 2023: St. Michel–Mavic–Auber93
- 2024–: Team TotalEnergies

Thomas Gachignard (born 17 August 2000) is a French cyclist, who currently rides for UCI ProTeam Team TotalEnergies.

== Major results ==
2021
Tour de la Manche

1st Stages 1 & 2 (ITT)

6th Chrono des Nations Espoirs
2022
7th Overall Tour de la Mirabelle
8th Overall Tour de Bretagne
2023
4th Overall Ronde de l'Oise

1st Points classification

9th Tro-Bro Léon
9th Grand Prix de Denain
2024
3rd Road race, National Road Championships
4th Overall Tour Poitou-Charentes en Nouvelle-Aquitaine
8th Tro-Bro Léon
9th Overall Four Days of Dunkirk
10th Dwars door Vlaanderen
Combativity award Stage 16 Tour de France
2025 (1 pro win)
1st Stage 1 Tour du Limousin
1st Mountains classification, Paris–Nice
2026
3rd Overall Tour de Luxembourg
7th GP Industria & Artigianato di Larciano

=== Grand Tour general classification results timeline ===
Grand Tour	2024
Giro d'Italia	—
Tour de France	92
Vuelta a España	—

Legend
—	Did not compete
DNF	Did not finish
