= Luxembourg Cycling Federation =

National governing body of cycle racing in Luxembourg

Fédération du Sport Cycliste Luxembourgeois
- Abbreviation: FSCL
- Formation: 1917
- Headquarters: Strassen, Luxembourg
- Region served: Luxembourg
- Members: Union Cycliste Internationale
- President: Camille Dahm
- Website: www.fscl.lu

The Luxembourg Cycling Federation (French: Fédération du Sport Cycliste Luxembourgeois), abbreviated to FSCL, is the national governing body of cycle racing in Luxembourg.

The FSCL is a member of the UCI, the UEC and the COSL.
