= 2024 La Drôme Classic =

2024 UCI ProSeries

Race details
- Dates: 25 February 2024
- Stages: 1
- Distance: 189 km (117.4 mi)
- Winning time: 4h 41' 28"

Results
	Winner	Marc Hirschi (SUI)	(UAE Team Emirates)
	Second	Juan Ayuso (ESP)	(UAE Team Emirates)
	Third	Maxim Van Gils (BEL)	(Lotto–Dstny)

The 2024 La Drôme Classic, officially the Faun Drôme Classic due to sponsorships, was the 11th edition of the Drôme Classic cycle race. It was held on 25 February 2024 as a category 1.Pro race on the 2024 UCI ProSeries. The race started and finished in Étoile-sur-Rhône and featured several climbs throughout. It formed a pair of races on the same weekend with the 2024 Faun-Ardèche Classic, held on the previous day.

== Teams ==
Nine of the eighteen UCI WorldTeams, six UCI ProTeams, and three UCI Continental teams made up the eighteen teams that participated in the race, with a total of 120 riders.

UCI WorldTeams

- Arkéa–B&B Hotels
- Cofidis
- Decathlon–AG2R La Mondiale
- Groupama–FDJ
- Intermarché–Wanty
- Lidl–Trek
- Soudal–Quick-Step
- Team dsm–firmenich PostNL
- UAE Team Emirates

UCI ProTeams

- Bingoal WB
- Israel–Premier Tech
- Lotto–Dstny
- Team TotalEnergies
- Tudor Pro Cycling Team
- Uno-X Mobility

UCI Continental Teams

- CIC U Nantes Atlantique
- Nice Métropole Côte d'Azur
- Van Rysel–Roubaix

== Result ==
Result
Rank	Rider	Team	Time
1	Marc Hirschi (SUI)	UAE Team Emirates	4h 41' 28"
2	Juan Ayuso (ESP)	UAE Team Emirates	+ 5"
3	Maxim Van Gils (BEL)	Lotto–Dstny	+ 8"
4	Warren Barguil (FRA)	Team dsm–firmenich PostNL	+ 12"
5	Mattias Skjelmose (DEN)	Lidl–Trek	+ 15"
6	Bastien Tronchon (FRA)	Decathlon–AG2R La Mondiale	+ 25"
7	Paul Lapeira (FRA)	Decathlon–AG2R La Mondiale	+ 1' 05"
8	Corbin Strong (NZL)	Israel–Premier Tech	+ 1' 07"
9	Benoît Cosnefroy (FRA)	Decathlon–AG2R La Mondiale	+ 1' 07"
10	Dorian Godon (FRA)	Decathlon–AG2R La Mondiale	+ 1' 21"
