= 2025 La Drôme Classic =

2025 UCI ProSeries

Race details
- Dates: 2 March 2025
- Stages: 1
- Distance: 189 km (117.4 mi)
- Winning time: 4h 31' 48"

Results
	Winner	Juan Ayuso (ESP)	(UAE Team Emirates XRG)
	Second	Mattias Skjelmose (DEN)	(Lidl–Trek)
	Third	Ben Tulett (GBR)	(Visma–Lease a Bike)

The 2025 La Drôme Classic, officially the Faun Drôme Classic due to sponsorships, was the 12th edition of the Drôme Classic cycle race. It was held on 2 March 2025 as a category 1.Pro race on the 2025 UCI ProSeries. The race started and finished in Étoile-sur-Rhône and will feature several climbs throughout. It forms a pair of races on the same weekend with the 2025 Faun-Ardèche Classic, held on the previous day.

== Teams ==
Twenty-three teams of up to seven riders will start the race, which will include thirteen UCI WorldTeams, six UCI ProTeams, and four UCI Continental teams.

UCI WorldTeams

- Arkéa–B&B Hotels
- Cofidis
- Decathlon–AG2R La Mondiale
- Groupama–FDJ
- EF Education–EasyPost
- Intermarché–Wanty
- Lidl–Trek
- Movistar Team
- Soudal–Quick-Step
- Team Picnic–PostNL
- UAE Team Emirates XRG
- Visma–Lease a Bike
- XDS Astana Team

UCI ProTeams

- Israel–Premier Tech
- Lotto
- Q36.5 Pro Cycling Team
- Unibet Tietema Rockets
- Team TotalEnergies
- Tudor Pro Cycling Team

UCI Continental Teams

- CIC–U–Nantes
- Nice Métropole Côte d'Azur
- St. Michel–Preference Home–Auber93
- Van Rysel–Roubaix

== Result ==
Result
Rank	Rider	Team	Time
1	Juan Ayuso (ESP)	UAE Team Emirates XRG	4h 31' 48"
2	Mattias Skjelmose (DEN)	Lidl–Trek	+ 23"
3	Ben Tulett (GBR)	Visma–Lease a Bike	+ 1' 15"
4	Marc Hirschi (SUI)	Tudor Pro Cycling Team	+ 1' 15"
5	Andrea Bagioli (ITA)	Lidl–Trek	+ 1' 15"
6	Dorian Godon (FRA)	Decathlon–AG2R La Mondiale	+ 1' 15"
7	Clément Champoussin (FRA)	XDS Astana Team	+ 1' 15"
8	Quinn Simmons (USA)	Lidl–Trek	+ 1' 15"
9	Warren Barguil (FRA)	Team Picnic–PostNL	+ 1' 15"
10	Lorenzo Fortunato (ITA)	XDS Astana Team	+ 1' 15"
