= 2022 La Drôme Classic =

2022 UCI ProSeries
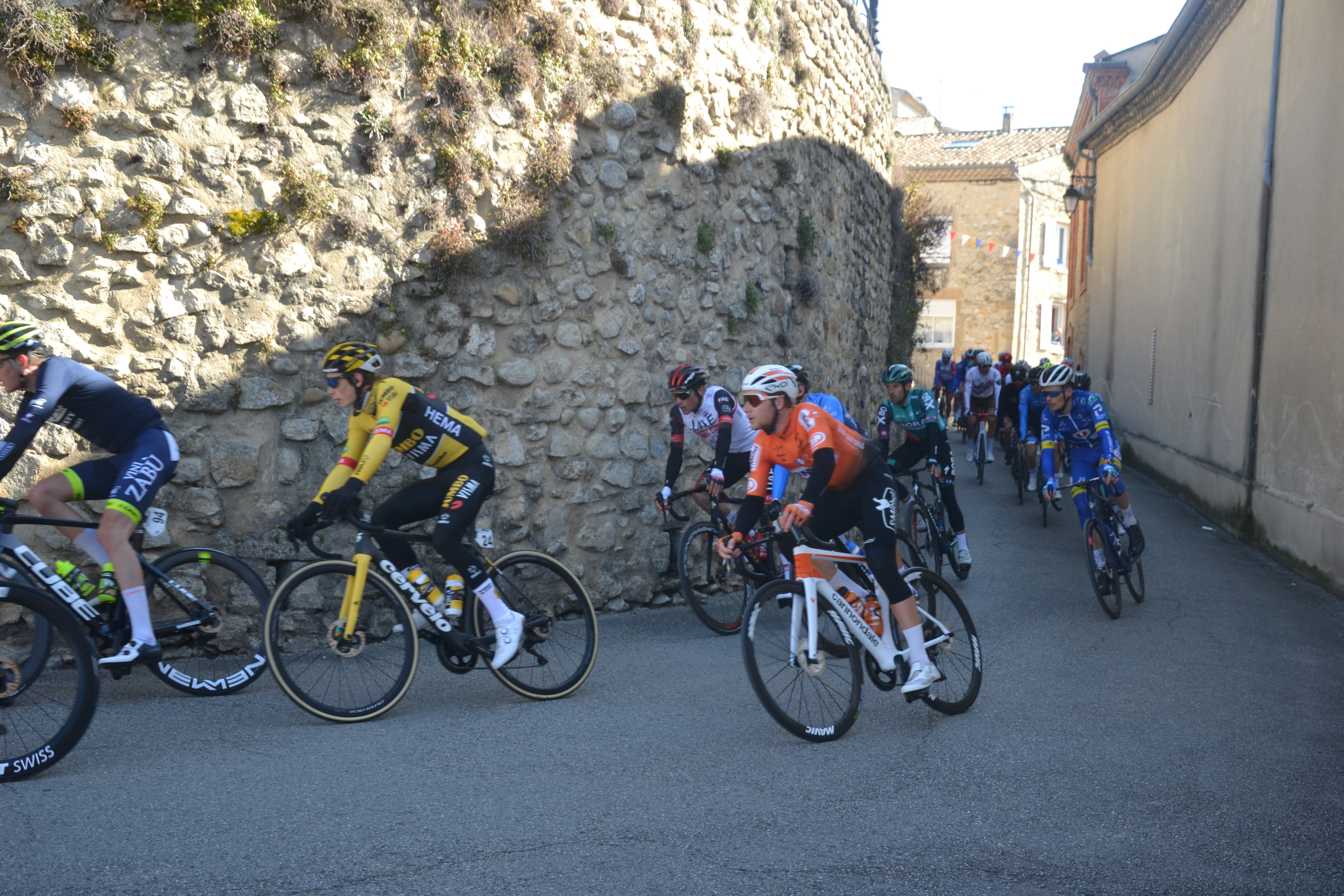

Race details
- Dates: 27 February 2022
- Stages: 1
- Distance: 191.5 km (119.0 mi)
- Winning time: 4h 37' 05"

Results
	Winner	Jonas Vingegaard (DEN)	(Team Jumbo–Visma)
	Second	Guillaume Martin (FRA)	(Cofidis)
	Third	Benoît Cosnefroy (FRA)	(AG2R Citroën Team)

The 2022 La Drôme Classic, officially the Faun Drôme Classic due to sponsorships, was the ninth edition of the Drôme Classic cycle race. It was held on 27 February 2022 as a category 1.Pro race on the 2022 UCI ProSeries. The race started and finished in Étoile-sur-Rhône and featured several climbs throughout. It formed a pair of races on the same weekend with the 2022 Faun-Ardèche Classic, held on the previous day.

== Teams ==
Eleven of the eighteen UCI WorldTeams, six UCI ProTeams, and five UCI Continental teams made up the twenty-two teams that participated in the race, with a total of 146 riders. 113 riders finished.

UCI WorldTeams

- AG2R Citroën Team
- Astana Qazaqstan Team
- Bora–Hansgrohe
- Cofidis
- Groupama–FDJ
- Intermarché–Wanty–Gobert Matériaux
- Lotto–Soudal
- Team Jumbo–Visma
- Trek–Segafredo
- Quick-Step Alpha Vinyl Team
- UAE Team Emirates

UCI ProTeams

- Alpecin–Fenix
- Arkéa–Samsic
- B&B Hotels–KTM
- Bingoal Pauwels Sauces WB
- Team TotalEnergies
- Uno-X Pro Cycling Team

UCI Continental Teams

- Go Sport–Roubaix–Lille Métropole
- Nice Métropole Côte d'Azur
- Riwal Cycling Team
- St. Michel–Auber93
- Team UC Nantes Atlantique

== Result ==
Result
Rank	Rider	Team	Time
1	Jonas Vingegaard (DEN)	Team Jumbo–Visma	4h 37' 05"
2	Guillaume Martin (FRA)	Cofidis	+ 3"
3	Benoît Cosnefroy (FRA)	AG2R Citroën Team	+ 3"
4	Juan Ayuso (ESP)	UAE Team Emirates	+ 21"
5	Julian Alaphilippe (FRA)	Quick-Step Alpha Vinyl Team	+ 29"
6	Alexis Vuillermoz (FRA)	Team TotalEnergies	+ 34"
7	Biniam Girmay (ERI)	Intermarché–Wanty–Gobert Matériaux	+ 36"
8	Stefano Oldani (ITA)	Alpecin–Fenix	+ 36"
9	Warren Barguil (FRA)	Arkéa–Samsic	+ 36"
10	Mathieu Burgaudeau (FRA)	Team TotalEnergies	+ 38"
