= 2023 La Flèche Wallonne =

Cycling race

2023 UCI World Tour, race 18 of 35
- Event poster

Race details
- Dates: 19 April 2023
- Stages: 1
- Distance: 194.2 km (120.7 mi)
- Winning time: 4h 27' 53"

Results
	Winner	Tadej Pogačar (SLO)	(UAE Team Emirates)
	Second	Mattias Skjelmose Jensen (DEN)	(Trek–Segafredo)
	Third	Mikel Landa (ESP)	(Team Bahrain Victorious)

The 2023 La Flèche Wallonne was a road cycling one-day race that took place on 19 April 2023 from the Belgian city of Herve to the municipality of Huy. It was the 87th edition of La Flèche Wallonne and the 18th event of the 2023 UCI World Tour. It was won by Tadej Pogačar.

== Teams ==
Twenty-five teams participated in the race, including all eighteen UCI WorldTeams and seven UCI ProTeams.

UCI WorldTeams

- AG2R Citroën Team
- Alpecin–Deceuninck
- Arkéa–Samsic
- Astana Qazaqstan Team
- Bora–Hansgrohe
- Cofidis
- EF Education–EasyPost
- Groupama–FDJ
- INEOS Grenadiers
- Intermarché–Circus–Wanty
- Movistar Team
- Soudal–Quick-Step
- Team Bahrain Victorious
- Team DSM
- Team Jayco–AlUla
- Team Jumbo–Visma
- Trek–Segafredo
- UAE Team Emirates

UCI ProTeams

- Bingoal WB
- Burgos BH
- Equipo Kern Pharma
- Israel–Premier Tech
- Lotto–Dstny
- Team TotalEnergies
- Uno-X Pro Cycling Team

== Result ==
Result
Rank	Rider	Team	Time
1	Tadej Pogačar (SLO)	UAE Team Emirates	4h 27' 53"
2	Mattias Skjelmose Jensen (DEN)	Trek–Segafredo	+ 0"
3	Mikel Landa (ESP)	Team Bahrain Victorious	+ 0"
4	Michael Woods (CAN)	Israel–Premier Tech	+ 3"
5	Giulio Ciccone (ITA)	Trek–Segafredo	+ 3"
6	Victor Lafay (FRA)	Cofidis	+ 3"
7	Tiesj Benoot (BEL)	Team Jumbo–Visma	+ 3"
8	Maxim Van Gils (BEL)	Lotto–Dstny	+ 3"
9	Romain Bardet (FRA)	Team DSM	+ 3"
10	Warren Barguil (FRA)	Arkéa–Samsic	+ 3"
