= Juan Ayuso =

Spanish racing cyclist (born 2002)

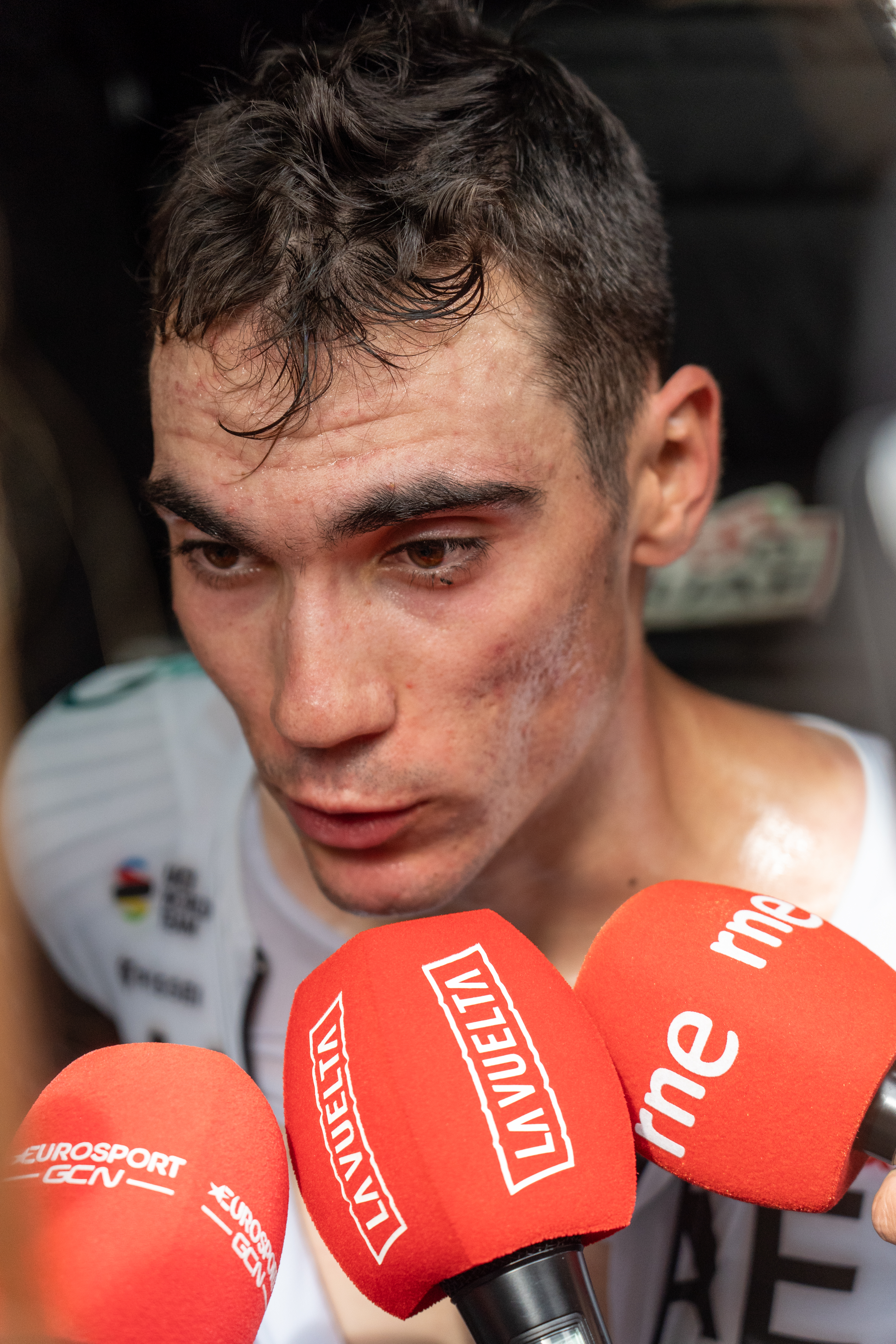
- Ayuso at the 2023 Vuelta a España

Personal information
- Full name: Juan Ayuso Pesquera
- Born: 16 September 2002 (age 24) Barcelona, Catalonia, Spain
- Height: 1.83 m (6 ft 0 in)
- Weight: 65 kg (143 lb)

Cycling career
- Sport: Cycling
- Current team: Lidl–Trek
- Discipline: Road
- Role: Rider
- Rider type: All-rounder; Climber

Amateur team
- 2019–2020: Bathco Cycling Team

Professional teams
- 2021: Team Colpack–Ballan
- 2021–2025: UAE Team Emirates
- 2026–: Lidl–Trek

Major wins
- Grand Tours Giro d'Italia 1 individual stage (2025) Vuelta a España Young rider classification (2023) 2 individual stages (2025) 1 TTT stage (2025) Stage races Tour of the Basque Country (2024) Tirreno–Adriatico (2025) Volta ao Algarve (2026) One-day races and Classics Ardèche Classic (2024) La Drôme Classic (2025) Trofeo Laigueglia (2025)
Medal record
Representing Spain
Men's road bicycle racing
European Championships
Bronze medal – third place	2021 Trentino	Under-23 road race

Juan Ayuso Pesquera (born 16 September 2002) is a Spanish road cyclist, who currently rides for UCI WorldTeam Lidl–Trek. He has twice finished in the top five at the Vuelta a España.

== Career ==
=== Early years ===
Ayuso started cycling when he was seven or eight years old, and looked up to Alberto Contador.

In 2017, he won the gold medal in the road race and the time trial at the Spanish Cadet Road Championships (15 to 16 years old), and defended his time trial title the following year. Moving up to the junior category, he immediately made an impact, winning the national junior road race title in 2019, and both the road race and time trial the following year. In 2020, he dominated the national junior racing circuit, winning the Vuelta al Besaya in addition to several other stage races.

=== Under-23 (2021) ===
In 2021, Ayuso joined UCI Continental team Team Colpack–Ballan, planning to compete at the under-23 level for a year before joining UCI WorldTeam UAE Team Emirates the following year. He quickly found success at this level, winning the overall title of the Giro Ciclistico d'Italia, the under-23 edition of the Giro d'Italia as well as the Giro del Belvedere and Trofeo Piva one-day races. Only several days after his win at the Giro Ciclistico d'Italia, he joined UAE Team Emirates early, on an initial contract lasting through 2025.

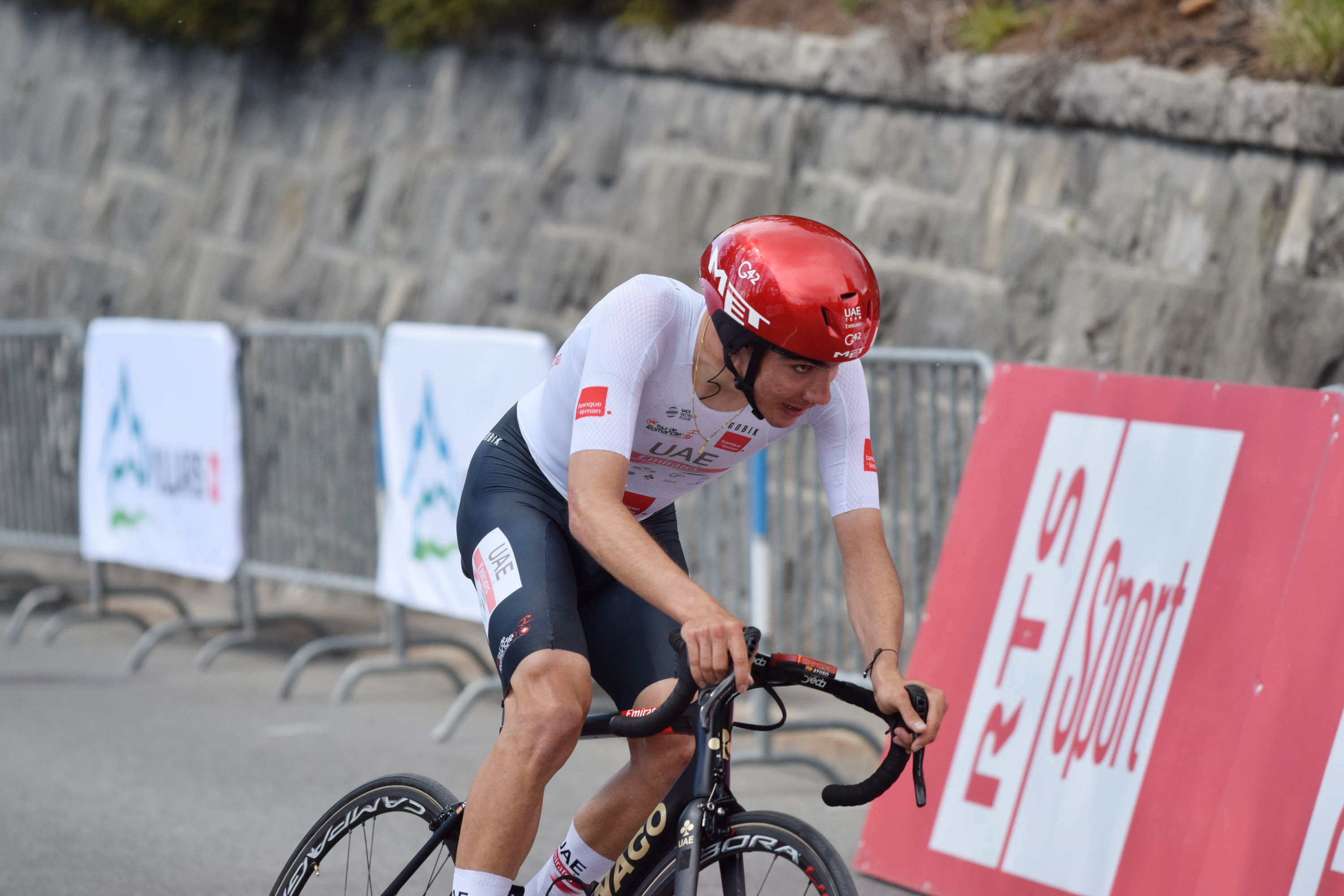
Ayuso at the 2022 Tour de Romandie

=== UAE Team Emirates (2021–2025) ===
Ayuso officially joined UAE Team Emirates on 15 June 2021. On 25 July in his third race with the team, he placed second in the Prueba Villafranca de Ordizia behind Luis León Sánchez. He then returned to the under-23 stage to race the Tour de l'Avenir, where he was considered the top favorite to win. However, he abandoned the race on stage four after crashing. He then competed in the road race at the UEC European Under-23 Road Championships, where he won the bronze medal in a seven-man sprint.

Ayuso showed strong form at the start of the 2022 season, with a fourth-place finish at the La Drôme Classic, then second in the Trofeo Laigueglia, finishing between his teammates Jan Polanc and Alessandro Covi. He then competed in the Volta a Catalunya, his first UCI World Tour stage race, where he finished fifth overall. At the beginning of May, he held second place in the Tour de Romandie going into the final time trial, where he lost time and fell to fourth place. However, he still took home the young rider classification award. He took his first professional victory in the Circuito de Getxo at the end of July in a four-man sprint. He was then selected for his first Grand Tour: the Vuelta a España, where he was the youngest rider in the race. He showed promise for the general classification early on, finishing fourth in the first mountain stage, 55 seconds behind the winner Jay Vine. This put him in fifth place overall. Ultimately, he managed to move up to third by the end of the race, behind Remco Evenepoel and Enric Mas. With this result five days before his 20th birthday, he became the second youngest rider in history to finish on the podium of a Grand Tour, behind Henri Cornet, the winner of the 1904 Tour de France.

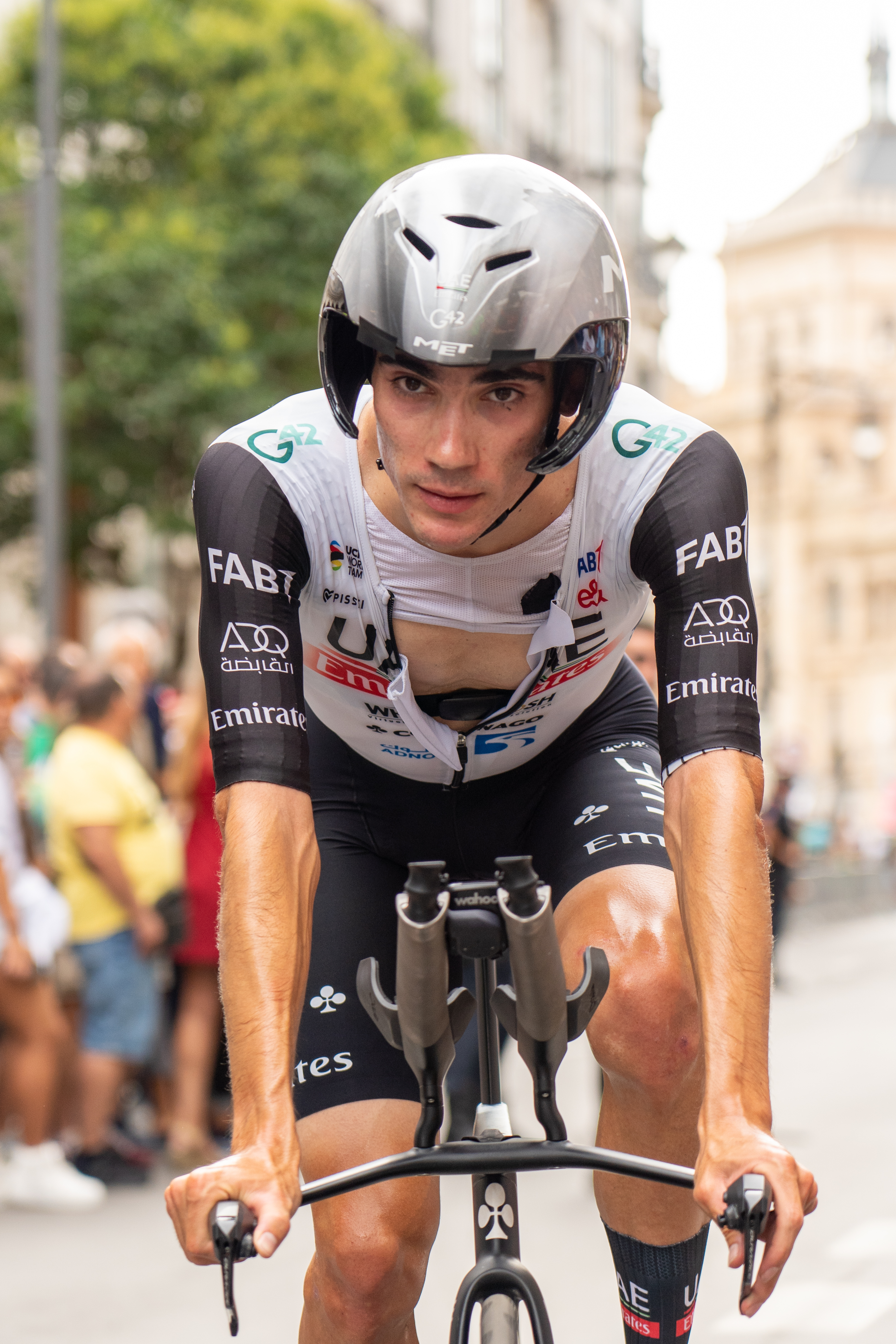
Ayuso at the 2023 Vuelta a España

Ayuso had a slow start to the 2023 season due to tendinitis in his right Achilles, and did not make his debut until the Tour de Romandie in April. He took the race lead after winning the stage three time trial, but fell back to 16th the following day. His next race was the Tour de Suisse. After having been in difficulty the stage before, he won the fifth stage solo on the day marred by the death of Gino Mäder. He then won the time trial on the eighth and final day, ultimately finishing second overall, nine seconds behind winner Mattias Skjelmose. In August, he entered his second Vuelta a España, where he took third-place finishes in stages three and eight, and finished fourth overall, winning the young rider classification in the process.

In February 2024, he won the Ardèche Classic in a four-way sprint ahead of Romain Grégoire, Mattias Skjelmose and Felix Gall. The following month, he competed in Tirreno–Adriatico, where he won the opening time trial. However, he lost the race lead to Jonas Vingegaard, taking home second. In April, he took part in the Tour of the Basque Country, which saw several of the main favorites abandon following a large crash during the fourth stage. Sitting in third overall going into the final stage, Ayuso was able to drop race leader Mattias Skjelmose on the last climb, securing the overall victory by a margin of 42 seconds to compatriot Carlos Rodríguez. This marked Ayuso's first major stage race win. He rode in the 2024 Tour de France, but had to abandon the race after testing positive for COVID.

Ayuso's breakout success continued at pace in March 2025 with victories in both the Faun Ardèche and Faun Drôme classics, the Trofeo Laigueglia, and an overall victory at the Tirreno–Adriatico. He entered the Giro d'Italia as a pre-race favorite, alongside Primož Roglič. However, Ayuso's race was marred by difficulties, including inter-team leadership battles and bad luck, of which included multiple crashes, and a bee sting which caused swelling in his right eye. Ayuso remained in the race despite losing over 50 minutes on stages 16 and 17, but abandoned after being dropped early on stage 18 while riding against doctor's advice.

In September 2025, midway through that year's Vuelta a España, the UAE Team Emirates-XRG announced Ayuso's early contract termination, saying that his exit was due to differences in vision regarding development plans and alignment with the team's sporting philosophy. Responding strongly, Ayuso revealed that his departure has been planned for the end of the season but was made public earlier than what he agreed upon without his consent. He accused the UAE management of acting like a "dictatorship" and attempting to damage his image. Prior to the announcement, strong rumours had linked Ayuso to Lidl-Trek.

=== Lidl-Trek (2026–present) ===
Ayuso signed a contract to ride for Team Lidl-Trek.

== Major results ==
2019
National Junior Road Championships

1st Road race
3rd Time trial

1st Stage 2 Bizkaiko Itzulia
2nd VII Trofeo Victor Cabedo
3rd Gipuzkoa Klasika
5th Overall Trophée Centre Morbihan
2020
National Junior Road Championships

1st Road race
1st Time trial

1st Overall Vuelta al Besaya

1st Points classification
1st Stages 1, 2 & 3

1st Overall Vuelta a Talavera Junior

1st Stages 1, 2, 3 (ITT) & 4

1st Overall Vuelta a la Subbética

1st Stages 1, 2 & 3

1st Overall Circuito del Guadiana Junior

1st Stages 1 & 2 (ITT)

1st Overall Trofeo Victor Cabedo

1st Stages 4 & 5

1st Gipuzkoa Klasika
UEC European Junior Road Championships

5th Time trial
7th Road race

2021
1st Overall Giro Ciclistico d'Italia

1st Points classification
1st Mountains classification
1st Young rider classification
1st Stages 2, 5 & 7

1st Overall Giro di Romagna

1st Mountains classification
1st Stages 2 & 3

1st Trofeo Piva
1st Giro del Belvedere
2nd Prueba Villafranca de Ordizia
3rd Road race, UEC European Under-23 Road Championships
2022 (1 pro win)
1st Circuito de Getxo
2nd Trofeo Laigueglia
3rd Overall Vuelta a España
4th Road race, National Road Championships
4th Overall Tour de Romandie

1st Young rider classification

4th La Drôme Classic
4th Prueba Villafranca de Ordizia
5th Overall Volta a Catalunya
2023 (3)
1st Stage 3 (ITT) Tour de Romandie
National Road Championships

2nd Road race
4th Time trial

2nd Overall Tour de Suisse

1st Stages 5 & 8 (ITT)

3rd Prueba Villafranca de Ordizia
4th Overall Vuelta a España

1st Young rider classification

2024 (4)
1st Overall Tour of the Basque Country

1st Young rider classification

1st Ardèche Classic
2nd Overall Tirreno–Adriatico

1st Young rider classification
1st Stage 1 (ITT)

2nd La Drôme Classic
3rd Trofeo Laigueglia
5th Overall Tour de Luxembourg

1st Stage 4 (ITT)

5th Overall Tour de Romandie
2025 (8)
1st Overall Tirreno–Adriatico

1st Young rider classification
1st Stage 6

1st La Drôme Classic
1st Trofeo Laigueglia
Giro d'Italia

1st Stage 7
Held after Stages 7–8

Vuelta a España

1st Stages 5 (TTT), 7 & 12
Held after Stages 2–5
Combativity award Stage 7

2nd Overall Volta a Catalunya

1st Young rider classification
1st Stage 3

2nd Circuito de Getxo
6th Road race, UEC European Road Championships
8th Road race, UCI Road World Championships
10th Ardèche Classic
2026 (2)
1st Overall Volta ao Algarve

1st Stage 5

3rd Overall Tour Auvergne-Rhône-Alpes
6th Overall Tour of Guangxi
7th Overall Tour de France

Held after Stages 1 & 10–13

=== General classification results timeline ===
Grand Tour general classification results
Grand Tour	2022	2023	2024	2025	2026
Giro d'Italia	—	—	—	DNF	—
Tour de France	—	—	DNF	—	7
Vuelta a España	3	4	—	68	
Major stage race general classification results
Major stage race	2022	2023	2024	2025	2026
Paris–Nice	—	—	—	—	DNF
Tirreno–Adriatico	—	—	2	1	—
Volta a Catalunya	5	—	—	2	—
Tour of the Basque Country	—	—	1	—	DNF
Tour de Romandie	4	16	5	—	—
Critérium du Dauphiné	DNF	—	DNF	—	3
Tour de Suisse	—	2	—	—	—

Legend
—	Did not compete
DNF	Did not finish
