= La Drôme Classic =

French one-day road cycling race

Race details
- Date: March
- Region: Drôme, France
- English name: The Drôme Classic
- Discipline: Road race
- Competition: UCI ProSeries
- Type: Single-day race
- Organiser: Ruoms Cyclisme Organisation
- Race director: Guillaume Delpech
- Web site: www.boucles-drome-ardeche.fr

History
- First edition: 2013 (cancelled); First held in 2014
- Editions: 12 (as of 2025)
- First winner: Romain Bardet (FRA)
- Most wins: No repeat winners
- Most recent: Juan Ayuso (ESP)

La Drôme Classic (English: The Drôme Classic) is an elite men's road bicycle racing event held annually in the Drôme region of France, held by the Ruoms Cyclisme Organisation. It is run as part of a weekend of racing in the south Ardèche, known as the Boucles du Sud Ardèche, along with the Classic Sud-Ardèche.

From 2013 to 2019, the men's event was held as a 1.1 rated event on the UCI Europe Tour. The first edition of the race, due to be held on 23 February 2013, was cancelled due to snow.

Beginning in 2020, the race was renamed as the Royal Bernard Drôme Classic and joined the UCI ProSeries.

== Winners ==
Year	Country	Rider	Team
2013	No race due to snow		
2014	France	Romain Bardet	Ag2r–La Mondiale
2015	France	Samuel Dumoulin	AG2R La Mondiale
2016	Czech Republic	Petr Vakoč	Etixx–Quick-Step
2017	Belgium	Sébastien Delfosse	WB Veranclassic Aqua Protect
2018	France	Lilian Calmejane	Direct Énergie
2019	France	Alexis Vuillermoz	AG2R La Mondiale
2020	Australia	Simon Clarke	EF Pro Cycling
2021	Italy	Andrea Bagioli	Deceuninck–Quick-Step
2022	Denmark	Jonas Vingegaard	Team Jumbo–Visma
2023	France	Anthony Perez	Cofidis
2024	Switzerland	Marc Hirschi	UAE Team Emirates
2025	Spain	Juan Ayuso	UAE Team Emirates XRG

=== Wins per country ===
Wins	Country
5	France
1	Australia; Belgium; Czech Republic; Denmark; Italy; Spain; Switzerland
