= 2022 Tour de Luxembourg =

2022 UCI Europe Tour 2022 UCI ProSeries

Race details
- Dates: 13 – 17 September 2022
- Stages: 5
- Distance: 178.4 km (110.9 mi)

Results
| Jersey awarded to the overall winner | Winner | Mattias Skjelmose Jensen (DEN) | (Trek–Segafredo) |
| | Second | Kévin Vauquelin (FRA) | (Arkéa–Samsic) |
| | Third | Valentin Madouas (FRA) | (Groupama–FDJ) |
| Jersey awarded to the points classification winner | Points | Matteo Trentin (ITA) | (UAE Team Emirates) |
| Jersey awarded to the mountains classification winner | Mountains | Joel Nicolau (ESP) | (Caja Rural–Seguros RGA) |
| Jersey awarded to the youth classification winner | Youth | Mattias Skjelmose Jensen (DEN) | (Trek–Segafredo) |
| | Team | UAE Team Emirates | |

The 2022 Tour de Luxembourg was the 82nd edition of the Tour de Luxembourg road cycling stage race. It started on 13 September and finished on 17 September, as part of the 2022 UCI ProSeries.

== Teams ==
Six UCI WorldTeams, nine UCI ProTeams, and four UCI Continental team made up the nineteen teams that participated in the race. Quick-Step Alpha Vinyl Team and Geofco–Doltcini Matériel-vélo.com were the only two teams not to have entered a full squad of six riders.

UCI WorldTeams

- AG2R Citroën Team
- Cofidis
- Groupama–FDJ
- Quick-Step Alpha Vinyl Team
- Trek–Segafredo
- UAE Team Emirates

UCI ProTeams

- Alpecin–Deceuninck
- Arkéa–Samsic
- B&B Hotels–KTM
- Bingoal Pauwels Sauces WB
- Burgos BH
- Caja Rural–Seguros RGA
- Euskaltel–Euskadi
- Sport Vlaanderen–Baloise
- Uno-X Pro Cycling Team

UCI Continental Teams

- Bolton Equities Black Spoke Pro Cycling
- Geofco–Doltcini Matériel-vélo.com
- Leopard Pro Cycling
- Riwal Cycling Team

== Route ==
Stage characteristics and winners
| Stage | Date | Course | Distance | Type | Winner |
|---|---|---|---|---|---|
| 1 | 13 September | Stade de Luxembourg to Luxembourg City (Kirchberg) | 163.8 km (101.8 mi) | Hilly stage | Valentin Madouas (FRA) |
| 2 | 14 September | Junglinster to Schifflange | 163.4 km (101.5 mi) | Hilly stage | Matteo Trentin (ITA) |
| 3 | 15 September | Rosport to Diekirch | 188.4 km (117.1 mi) | Mountain stage | Aaron Gate (NZL) |
| 4 | 16 September | Remich to Remich | 26.1 km (16.2 mi) | Individual time trial | Mattias Skjelmose Jensen (DEN) |
| 5 | 17 September | Mersch to Luxembourg City | 178.4 km (110.9 mi) | Hilly stage | Valentin Madouas (FRA) |
| Total | | | 720.1 km (447.4 mi) | | |

== Stages ==
=== Stage 1 ===
13 September 2022 — Stade de Luxembourg to Luxembourg City (Kirchberg), 163.8 km (101.8 mi)

Stage 1 Result
| Rank | Rider | Team | Time |
|---|---|---|---|
| 1 | Valentin Madouas (FRA) | Groupama–FDJ | 4h 00' 25" |
| 2 | Sjoerd Bax (NED) | Alpecin–Deceuninck | + 3" |
| 3 | Dorian Godon (FRA) | AG2R Citroën Team | + 7" |
| 4 | Matteo Trentin (ITA) | UAE Team Emirates | + 8" |
| 5 | Florian Sénéchal (FRA) | Quick-Step Alpha Vinyl Team | + 8" |
| 6 | Benjamin Thomas (FRA) | Cofidis | + 8" |
| 7 | Maxime Bouet (FRA) | Arkéa–Samsic | + 8" |
| 8 | Victor Koretzky (FRA) | B&B Hotels–KTM | + 8" |
| 9 | Franck Bonnamour (FRA) | B&B Hotels–KTM | + 8" |
| 10 | Rune Herregodts (BEL) | Sport Vlaanderen–Baloise | + 8" |

General classification after Stage 1
| Rank | Rider | Team | Time |
|---|---|---|---|
| 1 | Valentin Madouas (FRA) | Groupama–FDJ | 4h 00' 15" |
| 2 | Sjoerd Bax (NED) | Alpecin–Deceuninck | + 7" |
| 3 | Clément Berthet (FRA) | AG2R Citroën Team | + 13" |
| 4 | Matteo Trentin (ITA) | UAE Team Emirates | + 18" |
| 5 | Florian Sénéchal (FRA) | Quick-Step Alpha Vinyl Team | + 18" |
| 6 | Benjamin Thomas (FRA) | Cofidis | + 18" |
| 7 | Maxime Bouet (FRA) | Arkéa–Samsic | + 18" |
| 8 | Victor Koretzky (FRA) | B&B Hotels–KTM | + 18" |
| 9 | Franck Bonnamour (FRA) | B&B Hotels–KTM | + 18" |
| 10 | Rune Herregodts (BEL) | Sport Vlaanderen–Baloise | + 18" |

=== Stage 2 ===
14 September 2022 — Junglinster to Schifflange, 163.4 km (101.5 mi)

Stage 2 Result
| Rank | Rider | Team | Time |
|---|---|---|---|
| 1 | Matteo Trentin (ITA) | UAE Team Emirates | 3h 51' 51" |
| 2 | Florian Sénéchal (FRA) | Quick-Step Alpha Vinyl Team | + 0" |
| 3 | Davide Ballerini (ITA) | Quick-Step Alpha Vinyl Team | + 0" |
| 4 | Axel Laurance (FRA) | B&B Hotels–KTM | + 0" |
| 5 | Mattias Skjelmose Jensen (DEN) | Trek–Segafredo | + 0" |
| 6 | Jon Barrenetxea (ESP) | Caja Rural–Seguros RGA | + 0" |
| 7 | Tobias Bayer (AUT) | Alpecin–Deceuninck | + 0" |
| 8 | Benjamin Thomas (FRA) | Cofidis | + 0" |
| 9 | Victor Koretzky (FRA) | B&B Hotels–KTM | + 0" |
| 10 | Rui Oliveira (POR) | UAE Team Emirates | + 0" |

General classification after Stage 2
| Rank | Rider | Team | Time |
|---|---|---|---|
| 1 | Valentin Madouas (FRA) | Groupama–FDJ | 7h 52' 06" |
| 2 | Sjoerd Bax (NED) | Alpecin–Deceuninck | + 7" |
| 3 | Matteo Trentin (ITA) | UAE Team Emirates | + 8" |
| 4 | Bastien Tronchon (FRA) | AG2R Citroën Team | + 9" |
| 5 | Florian Sénéchal (FRA) | Quick-Step Alpha Vinyl Team | + 12" |
| 6 | Clément Berthet (FRA) | AG2R Citroën Team | + 13" |
| 7 | Benjamin Thomas (FRA) | Cofidis | + 18" |
| 8 | Victor Koretzky (FRA) | B&B Hotels–KTM | + 18" |
| 9 | Mattias Skjelmose Jensen (DEN) | Trek–Segafredo | + 18" |
| 10 | Jonas Gregaard (DEN) | Uno-X Pro Cycling Team | + 18" |

=== Stage 3 ===
15 September 2022 — Rosport to Diekirch, 188.4 km (117.1 mi)

Stage 3 Result
| Rank | Rider | Team | Time |
|---|---|---|---|
| 1 | Aaron Gate (NZL) | Bolton Equities Black Spoke Pro Cycling | 4h 40' 58" |
| 2 | Benjamin Thomas (FRA) | Cofidis | + 0" |
| 3 | Davide Ballerini (ITA) | Quick-Step Alpha Vinyl Team | + 0" |
| 4 | Matteo Trentin (ITA) | UAE Team Emirates | + 0" |
| 5 | Florian Sénéchal (FRA) | Quick-Step Alpha Vinyl Team | + 0" |
| 6 | Axel Laurance (FRA) | B&B Hotels–KTM | + 0" |
| 7 | Kristian Sbaragli (ITA) | Alpecin–Deceuninck | + 0" |
| 8 | Dorian Godon (FRA) | AG2R Citroën Team | + 0" |
| 9 | Valentin Madouas (FRA) | Groupama–FDJ | + 0" |
| 10 | Rémy Mertz (BEL) | Bingoal Pauwels Sauces WB | + 0" |

General classification after Stage 3
| Rank | Rider | Team | Time |
|---|---|---|---|
| 1 | Valentin Madouas (FRA) | Groupama–FDJ | 12h 33' 04" |
| 2 | Sjoerd Bax (NED) | Alpecin–Deceuninck | + 7" |
| 3 | Matteo Trentin (ITA) | UAE Team Emirates | + 8" |
| 4 | Aaron Gate (NZL) | Bolton Equities Black Spoke Pro Cycling | + 8" |
| 5 | Bastien Tronchon (FRA) | AG2R Citroën Team | + 9" |
| 6 | Florian Sénéchal (FRA) | Quick-Step Alpha Vinyl Team | + 12" |
| 7 | Benjamin Thomas (FRA) | Cofidis | + 12" |
| 8 | Clément Berthet (FRA) | AG2R Citroën Team | + 13" |
| 9 | Mattias Skjelmose Jensen (DEN) | Trek–Segafredo | + 18" |
| 10 | Rune Herregodts (BEL) | Sport Vlaanderen–Baloise | + 18" |

=== Stage 4 ===
16 September 2022 — Remich to Remich, 26.1 km (16.2 mi) (ITT)

Stage 4 Result
| Rank | Rider | Team | Time |
|---|---|---|---|
| 1 | Mattias Skjelmose Jensen (DEN) | Trek–Segafredo | 34' 05" |
| 2 | Kévin Vauquelin (FRA) | Arkéa–Samsic | + 3" |
| 3 | Morten Hulgaard (DEN) | Uno-X Pro Cycling Team | + 13" |
| 4 | Thibault Guernalec (FRA) | Arkéa–Samsic | + 15" |
| 5 | Sjoerd Bax (NED) | Alpecin–Deceuninck | + 25" |
| 6 | Kevin Geniets (LUX) | Groupama–FDJ | + 25" |
| 7 | Jason Osborne (GER) | Alpecin–Deceuninck | + 26" |
| 8 | Rune Herregodts (BEL) | Sport Vlaanderen–Baloise | + 27" |
| 9 | Jonas Gregaard (DEN) | Uno-X Pro Cycling Team | + 37" |
| 10 | Valentin Madouas (FRA) | Groupama–FDJ | + 39" |

General classification after Stage 4
| Rank | Rider | Team | Time |
|---|---|---|---|
| 1 | Mattias Skjelmose Jensen (DEN) | Trek–Segafredo | 13h 07' 27" |
| 2 | Kévin Vauquelin (FRA) | Arkéa–Samsic | + 3" |
| 3 | Sjoerd Bax (NED) | Alpecin–Deceuninck | + 14" |
| 4 | Valentin Madouas (FRA) | Groupama–FDJ | + 21" |
| 5 | Kevin Geniets (LUX) | Groupama–FDJ | + 25" |
| 6 | Jason Osborne (GER) | Alpecin–Deceuninck | + 26" |
| 7 | Rune Herregodts (BEL) | Sport Vlaanderen–Baloise | + 27" |
| 8 | Matteo Trentin (ITA) | UAE Team Emirates | + 31" |
| 9 | Jonas Gregaard (DEN) | Uno-X Pro Cycling Team | + 37" |
| 10 | Benjamin Thomas (FRA) | Cofidis | + 39" |

=== Stage 5 ===
17 September 2022 — Mersch to Luxembourg City (Limpertsberg), 178.4 km (110.9 mi)

Stage 5 Result
| Rank | Rider | Team | Time |
|---|---|---|---|
| 1 | Valentin Madouas (FRA) | Groupama–FDJ | 4h 36' 08" |
| 2 | Mattias Skjelmose Jensen (DEN) | Trek–Segafredo | + 0" |
| 3 | Kévin Vauquelin (FRA) | Arkéa–Samsic | + 0" |
| 4 | Kevin Geniets (LUX) | Groupama–FDJ | + 0" |
| 5 | Matteo Trentin (ITA) | UAE Team Emirates | + 3" |
| 6 | Axel Laurance (FRA) | B&B Hotels–KTM | + 3" |
| 7 | Rémy Mertz (BEL) | Bingoal Pauwels Sauces WB | + 3" |
| 8 | Dorian Godon (FRA) | AG2R Citroën Team | + 3" |
| 9 | Marco Tizza (ITA) | Bingoal Pauwels Sauces WB | + 3" |
| 10 | Sjoerd Bax (NED) | Alpecin–Deceuninck | + 3" |

General classification after Stage 5
| Rank | Rider | Team | Time |
|---|---|---|---|
| 1 | Mattias Skjelmose Jensen (DEN) | Trek–Segafredo | 17h 43' 29" |
| 2 | Kévin Vauquelin (FRA) | Arkéa–Samsic | + 5" |
| 3 | Valentin Madouas (FRA) | Groupama–FDJ | + 17" |
| 4 | Sjoerd Bax (NED) | Alpecin–Deceuninck | + 23" |
| 5 | Kevin Geniets (LUX) | Groupama–FDJ | + 31" |
| 6 | Matteo Trentin (ITA) | UAE Team Emirates | + 40" |
| 7 | Jonas Gregaard (DEN) | Uno-X Pro Cycling Team | + 53" |
| 8 | Benjamin Thomas (FRA) | Cofidis | + 55" |
| 9 | Aaron Gate (NZL) | Bolton Equities Black Spoke Pro Cycling | + 56" |
| 10 | Rune Herregodts (BEL) | Sport Vlaanderen–Baloise | + 57" |

== Classification leadership table ==
Classification leadership by stage
| Stage | Winner | General classification | Points classification | Mountains classification | Young rider classification | Team classification |
|---|---|---|---|---|---|---|
| 1 | Valentin Madouas | Valentin Madouas | Valentin Madouas | Gil Gelders | Clément Berthet | Alpecin–Deceuninck |
| 2 | Matteo Trentin | Valentin Madouas | Matteo Trentin | Joel Nicolau | Bastien Tronchon | Alpecin–Deceuninck |
| 3 | Aaron Gate | Valentin Madouas | Matteo Trentin | Joel Nicolau | Bastien Tronchon | Alpecin–Deceuninck |
| 4 | Mattias Skjelmose Jensen | Mattias Skjelmose Jensen | Matteo Trentin | Joel Nicolau | Mattias Skjelmose Jensen | Arkéa–Samsic |
| 5 | Valentin Madouas | Mattias Skjelmose Jensen | Matteo Trentin | Joel Nicolau | Mattias Skjelmose Jensen | UAE Team Emirates |
| Final | | Mattias Skjelmose Jensen | Matteo Trentin | Joel Nicolau | Mattias Skjelmose Jensen | UAE Team Emirates |

== Final classification standings ==
Legend
| Denotes the winner of the general classification | Denotes the winner of the mountains classification |
| Denotes the winner of the points classification | Denotes the winner of the young rider classification |

=== General classification ===
Final general classification (1–10)
| Rank | Rider | Team | Time |
|---|---|---|---|
| 1 | Mattias Skjelmose Jensen (DEN) | Trek–Segafredo | 17h 43' 29" |
| 2 | Kévin Vauquelin (FRA) | Arkéa–Samsic | + 5" |
| 3 | Valentin Madouas (FRA) | Groupama–FDJ | + 17" |
| 4 | Sjoerd Bax (NED) | Alpecin–Deceuninck | + 23" |
| 5 | Kevin Geniets (LUX) | Groupama–FDJ | + 31" |
| 6 | Matteo Trentin (ITA) | UAE Team Emirates | + 40" |
| 7 | Jonas Gregaard (DEN) | Uno-X Pro Cycling Team | + 53" |
| 8 | Benjamin Thomas (FRA) | Cofidis | + 55" |
| 9 | Aaron Gate (NZL) | Bolton Equities Black Spoke Pro Cycling | + 56" |
| 10 | Rune Herregodts (BEL) | Sport Vlaanderen–Baloise | + 57" |

=== Points classification ===
Final points classification (1–10)
| Rank | Rider | Team | Points |
|---|---|---|---|
| 1 | Matteo Trentin (ITA) | UAE Team Emirates | 51 |
| 2 | Mattias Skjelmose Jensen (DEN) | Trek–Segafredo | 45 |
| 3 | Valentin Madouas (FRA) | Groupama–FDJ | 43 |
| 4 | Florian Sénéchal (FRA) | Quick-Step Alpha Vinyl Team | 34 |
| 5 | Kévin Vauquelin (FRA) | Arkéa–Samsic | 29 |
| 6 | Sjoerd Bax (NED) | Alpecin–Deceuninck | 26 |
| 7 | Benjamin Thomas (FRA) | Cofidis | 26 |
| 8 | Davide Ballerini (ITA) | Quick-Step Alpha Vinyl Team | 26 |
| 9 | Axel Laurence (FRA) | B&B Hotels–KTM | 25 |
| 10 | Aaron Gate (NZL) | Bolton Equities Black Spoke Pro Cycling | 20 |

=== Mountains classification ===
Final mountains classification (1–10)
| Rank | Rider | Team | Points |
|---|---|---|---|
| 1 | Joel Nicolau (ESP) | Caja Rural–Seguros RGA | 35 |
| 2 | Gil Gelders (BEL) | Bingoal Pauwels Sauces WB | 12 |
| 3 | Felix Gall (AUT) | AG2R Citroën Team | 9 |
| 4 | Morten Hulgaard (DEN) | Uno-X Pro Cycling Team | 7 |
| 5 | Joel Suter (SUI) | UAE Team Emirates | 6 |
| 6 | Sander Armée (BEL) | Cofidis | 6 |
| 7 | Victor Koretzky (FRA) | B&B Hotels–KTM | 5 |
| 8 | Kasper Viberg Søgaard (DEN) | Riwal Cycling Team | 5 |
| 9 | Pierre Rolland (FRA) | B&B Hotels–KTM | 5 |
| 10 | Antonio Jesús Soto (ESP) | Euskaltel–Euskadi | 5 |

=== Young rider classification ===
Final young rider classification (1–10)
| Rank | Rider | Team | Time |
|---|---|---|---|
| 1 | Mattias Skjelmose Jensen (DEN) | Trek–Segafredo | 17h 43' 29" |
| 2 | Kévin Vauquelin (FRA) | Arkéa–Samsic | + 5" |
| 3 | Kevin Geniets (LUX) | Groupama–FDJ | + 31" |
| 4 | Rune Herregodts (BEL) | Sport Vlaanderen–Baloise | + 57" |
| 5 | Joel Suter (SUI) | UAE Team Emirates | + 59" |
| 6 | Clément Berthet (FRA) | AG2R Citroën Team | + 1' 02" |
| 7 | Bastien Tronchon (FRA) | AG2R Citroën Team | + 1' 23" |
| 8 | Felix Gall (AUT) | AG2R Citroën Team | + 2' 54" |
| 9 | Michel Ries (LUX) | Arkéa–Samsic | + 3' 03" |
| 10 | Jon Barrenetxea (ESP) | Caja Rural–Seguros RGA | + 3' 33" |

=== Team classification ===
Final team classification (1–10)
| Rank | Team | Time |
|---|---|---|
| 1 | UAE Team Emirates | 53h 13' 52" |
| 2 | Alpecin–Deceuninck | + 1" |
| 3 | AG2R Citroën Team | + 33" |
| 4 | Arkéa–Samsic | + 1' 16" |
| 5 | Groupama–FDJ | + 1' 58" |
| 6 | Cofidis | + 2' 15" |
| 7 | B&B Hotels–KTM | + 4' 07" |
| 8 | Bolton Equities Black Spoke Pro Cycling | + 4' 53" |
| 9 | Uno-X Pro Cycling Team | + 9' 38" |
| 10 | Quick-Step Alpha Vinyl Team | + 10' 26" |
