= Mattias Skjelmose =

Danish cyclist (born 2000)

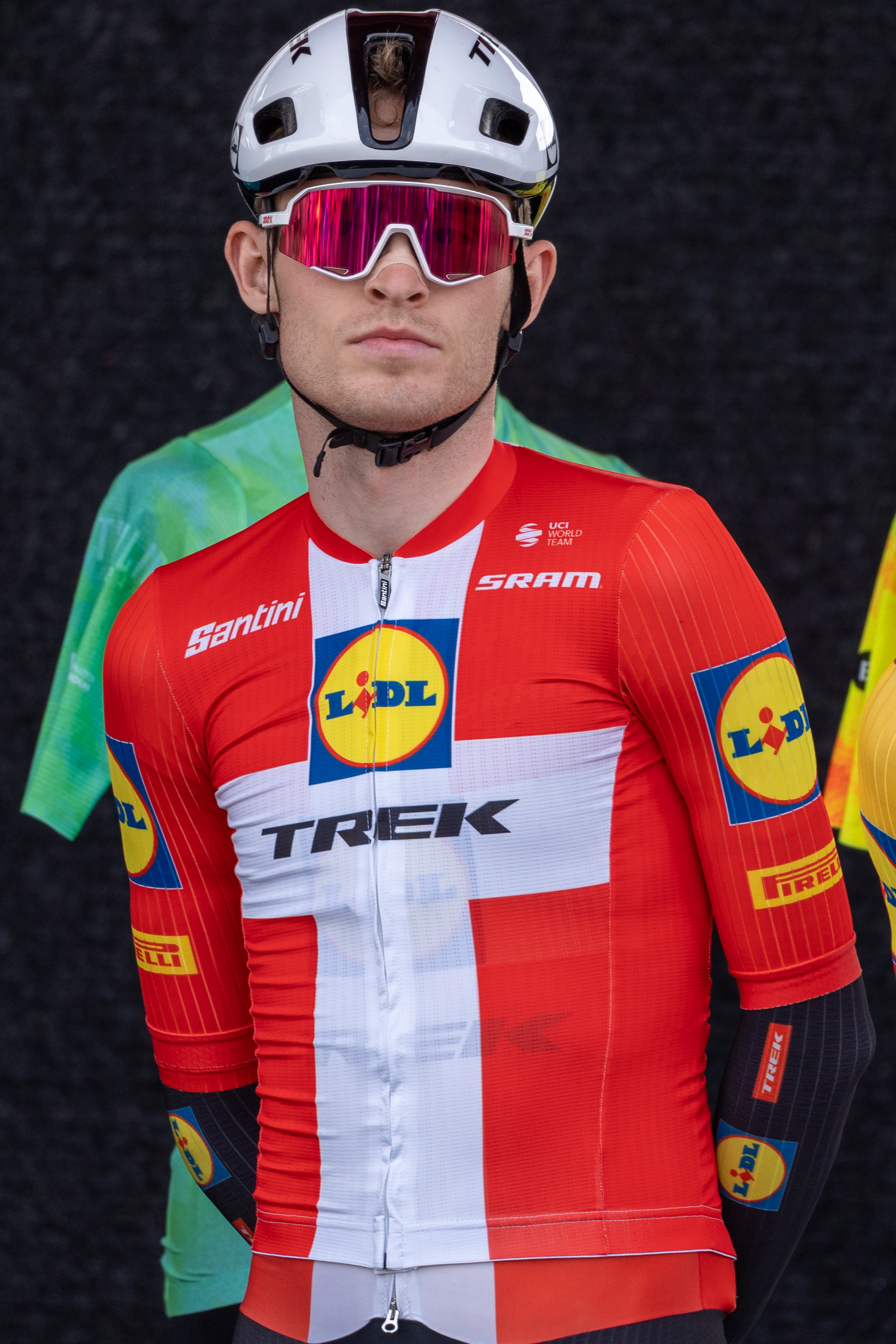
- Skjelmose in Espelette, 2024 Itzulia.

Personal information
- Full name: Mattias Skjelmose Jensen
- Nickname: Missen fra Amager (The Kitty from Amager)
- Born: 26 September 2000 (age 26) Copenhagen, Denmark
- Height: 1.80 m (5 ft 11 in)
- Weight: 65 kg (143 lb)

Cycling career
- Sport: Cycling
- Current team: Lidl–Trek
- Discipline: Road
- Role: Rider
- Rider type: All-rounder

Amateur teams
- 2012–2016: Amager Cykle Ring
- 2017–2018: Team Børkop Cykler; Carl Ras Roskilde Junior
- 2019: IBT-Ridley Carl Ras-Sydkysten

Professional teams
- 2020: Leopard Pro Cycling
- 2020: Trek–Segafredo (stagiaire)
- 2021–: Trek–Segafredo

Major wins
- Grand Tours Vuelta a España Young rider classification (2024) Stage races Tour de Suisse (2023) Tour de Luxembourg (2022) One-day races and Classics National Road Race Championships (2023) National Time Trial Championships (2024) Amstel Gold Race (2025) Maryland Cycling Classic (2023)

Mattias Skjelmose Jensen (born 26 September 2000) is a Danish professional cyclist who rides for UCI WorldTeam Lidl–Trek.

A promising youth rider, Skjelmose finished in top positions in junior categories of major races, and won the Tour du Pays de Vaud in 2018. Shortly after, he had a setback after receiving a ten-month suspension due to a doping test revealing traces of the performance-enhancing drugs originating from dietary supplements. He returned to racing in 2019, and initially joined UCI Continental team Leopard TOGT Pro Cycling before turning professional in 2021 with UCI WorldTeam Trek-Segafredo, after riding for the latter as a stagiare since 2020. He experienced a major breakthrough in 2023, finishing second behind Tadej Pogačar in La Flèche Wallonne, and winning the Tour de Suisse. In 2025, he won the Amstel Gold Race.

== Career ==
=== Junior career ===
Skjelmose was born in Copenhagen, Denmark, and grew up on Amager. He started cycling at local club Amager Cykle Ring, where he rode between 2012 and 2016.

Skjelmose finished second at the 2017 Danish National Road Race Championships junior category. At the Peace Race Juniors in 2018, he finished second behind Remco Evenepoel. The same year he finished third at the Paris–Roubaix Juniors. On 26 May 2018, Skjelmose won an individual time trial in the Tour du Pays de Vaud, and later that same day, he also finished 22nd in a regular road stage. The following day, he concluded by winning the overall classification of the Swiss junior stage race.

==== 2018 doping case ====
On 26 May 2018, during the Tour du Pays de Vaud, a doping test conducted on Skjelmose revealed traces of the substance methylhexanamine, a performance-enhancing drug prohibited during competitions. He claims that it originated from one of the dietary supplements he had taken. After the case was processed by the Cycling Anti-Doping Foundation (CADF), he was sentenced to a ten-month suspension by the Union Cycliste Internationale (UCI) for violating anti-doping regulations. He initiated the suspension on 7 July 2018, and the suspension lasted until 6 May 2019. Skjelmose was only 17 years old at the time of the positive doping test. Therefore, the Danish Cycling Federation (DCU) did not expect to see his name or the verdict in the media, as they had previously been informed by the UCI that the verdict would not be made public.

=== Professional career ===
In 2020, Skjelmose initially joined the UCI Continental team Leopard TOGT Pro Cycling in the senior category and later became a trainee for the UCI WorldTeam Trek-Segafredo towards the end of the season. He was subsequently offered a professional contract for the seasons starting in 2021. In his first season with Trek, he finished sixth overall in the UAE Tour, a UCI World Tour stage race. In the Tour of Norway, he finished seventh in the general classification and won the young rider classification. At the beginning of the 2022 season, he finished second on the final stage of the Tour de la Provence, a mountain finish, which propelled him to third place overall and earned him the title of the best young rider. That same season, he selected for his first Grand Tour, as he was named in the startlist for the Giro d'Italia. He achieved his first pro victories in the Tour de Luxembourg, where he won a stage and the overall classification.

==== 2023 ====
On 19 April 2023, Skjelmose finished in second place at La Flèche Wallonne, at the top of the Mur de Huy, just behind Tadej Pogačar. In June 2023, he achieved his first victories in a UCI World Tour event by winning stage 3 in Villars-sur-Ollon, as well as the overall classification of the Tour de Suisse, in front of Juan Ayuso and world champion Remco Evenepoel.

In June 2023, he was named in Trek-Lidl's startlist for the Tour de France, and was seen as a wildcard for the overall classification. His performances in the 2023 season were praised by Lance Armstrong: "If you're talking all day long about Vingegaard and Pogačar, who's number three... boy, I feel like he's gonna start trickling into the top."

==== 2024 ====
In 2024, Skjelmose finished fourth in the 2024 Paris–Nice; he won Stage 6 after outsprinting two other riders who were part of a three-man breakaway. In April, he placed third overall in the Tour of the Basque Country.

==== 2025 ====
On 20 April 2025, he beat pre-race favourites Tadej Pogacar and Remco Evenepoel in a sprint finish to win the 2025 Amstel Gold Race.

== Major results ==
2017
1st Mountains classification, Course de la Paix Juniors
2nd Road race, National Junior Road Championships
5th Overall Internationale Niedersachsen-Rundfahrt der Junioren
2018
1st Overall Tour du Pays de Vaud

1st Stage 3b (ITT)

2nd Overall Course de la Paix Juniors
3rd Paris–Roubaix Juniors
2019
3rd Fyen Rundt
4th Time trial, National Under-23 Road Championships
2021
5th Overall Tour de l'Ain
6th Overall UAE Tour
7th Overall Tour of Norway

1st Young rider classification

8th Overall Danmark Rundt
2022 (2 pro wins)
1st Overall Tour de Luxembourg

1st Young rider classification
1st Stage 4 (ITT)

2nd Overall Tour de l'Ain

1st Points classification
1st Young rider classification

3rd Time trial, National Road Championships
3rd Overall Tour de la Provence

1st Young rider classification

3rd Overall Danmark Rundt
3rd Overall Tour de Wallonie
5th Overall Route d'Occitanie
8th Clásica de San Sebastián
10th Road race, UCI Road World Championships
2023 (7)
National Road Championships

1st Road race
2nd Time trial

1st Overall Tour de Suisse

1st Young rider classification
1st Stage 3

1st Maryland Cycling Classic
2nd Overall Étoile de Bessèges

1st Young rider classification
1st Stage 4

2nd Overall Danmark Rundt

1st Stage 3

2nd La Flèche Wallonne
3rd Ardèche Classic
3rd GP Miguel Induráin
5th Overall Tour des Alpes-Maritimes et du Var

1st Points classification
1st Stage 2

6th La Drôme Classic
8th Amstel Gold Race
9th Liège–Bastogne–Liège
9th Grand Prix Cycliste de Montréal
10th Grand Prix Cycliste de Québec
2024 (2)
1st Time trial, National Road Championships
3rd Overall Tour de Suisse

1st Young rider classification

3rd Overall Tour of the Basque Country
3rd Ardèche Classic
4th Overall Paris–Nice

1st Stage 6

5th Overall Vuelta a España

1st Young rider classification

5th La Drôme Classic
2025 (3)
1st Amstel Gold Race
1st Andorra MoraBanc Clàssica
2nd Overall Tour de Luxembourg

1st Young rider classification
1st Stage 3

2nd La Drôme Classic
4th Road race, UCI Road World Championships
4th Grand Prix Cycliste de Québec
5th Overall Tour of the Basque Country
6th Ardèche Classic
7th Road race, UEC European Road Championships
8th Overall Danmark Rundt
2026
2nd Amstel Gold Race
5th La Flèche Wallonne
5th Ardèche Classic
6th Overall Tour de France
6th Overall Tour Auvergne-Rhône-Alpes
7th Overall Volta a Catalunya

=== General classification results timeline ===
Grand Tour general classification results
Grand Tour	2021	2022	2023	2024	2025	2026
Giro d'Italia	—	40	—	—	—	—
Tour de France	—	—	29	—	DNF	6
Vuelta a España	—	—	—	5	—	
Major stage race general classification results
Major stage race	2021	2022	2023	2024	2025	2026
Paris–Nice	—	—	DNF	4	DNF	—
Tirreno–Adriatico	—	—	—	—	—	—
Volta a Catalunya	83	16	—	—	—	7
Tour of the Basque Country	—	—	17	3	5	14
Tour de Romandie	15	—	—	—	—	—
Critérium du Dauphiné	21	—	—	—	—	6
Tour de Suisse	—	—	1	3	—	—

=== Classics results timeline ===
Monument	2021	2022	2023	2024	2025	2026
Milan–San Remo	—	—	—	—	—	—
Tour of Flanders	—	—	—	—	—	—
Paris–Roubaix	—	—	—	—	—	—
Liège–Bastogne–Liège	—	66	9	28	39	17
Giro di Lombardia	—	DNF	—	—	DNF	
Classic	2021	2022	2023	2024	2025	2026
Amstel Gold Race	—	—	8	17	1	2
La Flèche Wallonne	—	18	2	DNF	DNF	5
Clásica de San Sebastián	—	8	—	—	—	
Bretagne Classic	41	—	—	—	—	
Grand Prix Cycliste de Québec	—	—	10	—	4	
Grand Prix Cycliste de Montréal	—	—	9	—	17	

Legend
—	Did not compete
DNF	Did not finish
