= 2023 Maryland Cycling Classic =

2023 UCI ProSeries

Race details
- Dates: 3 September 2023
- Stages: 1
- Distance: 196 km (121.8 mi)
- Winning time: 4h 26' 05"

Results
	Winner	Mattias Skjelmose (DEN)	(Lidl–Trek)
	Second	Neilson Powless (USA)	(EF Education–EasyPost)
	Third	Hugo Houle (CAN)	(Israel–Premier Tech)

The 2023 Maryland Cycling Classic (known as the Maryland Cycling Classic, presented by UnitedHealthcare for sponsorship reasons) was the second edition of the Maryland Cycling Classic. It was held on 3 September 2023 as part of the 2023 UCI ProSeries calendar.

== Teams ==
Five UCI WorldTeams, four UCI ProTeams, six UCI Continental teams and the American national team made up the sixteen teams that participated in the race.

UCI WorldTeams

- Astana Qazaqstan Team
- Cofidis
- EF Education–EasyPost
- Lidl–Trek
- Team Jayco–AlUla

UCI ProTeams

- Human Powered Health
- Israel–Premier Tech
- Team Corratec–Selle Italia
- Team Novo Nordisk

UCI Continental Teams

- Hagens Berman Axeon
- L39ION of Los Angeles
- Team Medellín–EPM
- Project Echelon Racing
- Team Skyline
- Toronto Hustle

National Teams

- United States

== Result ==
Result
Rank	Rider	Team	Time
1	Mattias Skjelmose (DEN)	Lidl–Trek	4h 26' 05"
2	Neilson Powless (USA)	EF Education–EasyPost	+ 2' 20"
3	Hugo Houle (CAN)	Israel–Premier Tech	+ 2' 20"
4	Lucas Hamilton (AUS)	Team Jayco–AlUla	+ 2' 20"
5	Toms Skujiņš (LAT)	Lidl–Trek	+ 2' 56"
6	Mikkel Frølich Honoré (DEN)	EF Education–EasyPost	+ 4' 54"
7	Scott McGill (USA)	Human Powered Health	+ 4' 56"
8	Alexandre Balmer (SUI)	Team Jayco–AlUla	+ 5' 00"
9	Riley Sheehan (USA)	Israel–Premier Tech	+ 5' 04"
10	Eder Frayre (MEX)	L39ION of Los Angeles	+ 5' 04"
