= Romain Bardet =

French cyclist (born 1990)

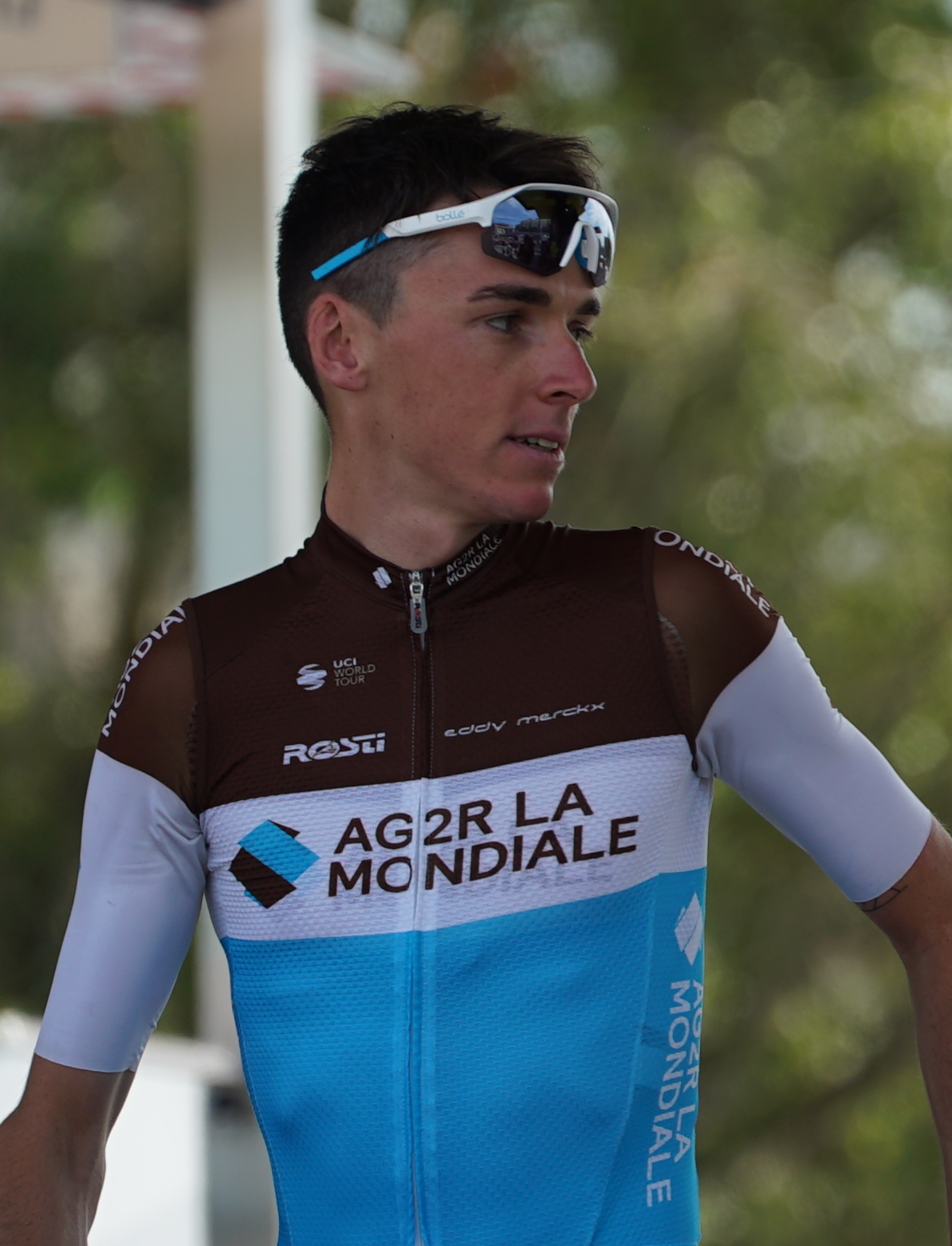
- Bardet at the 2019 Tour de France

Personal information
- Full name: Romain Bardet
- Nickname: L'Empereur Romain (The Roman Emperor)
- Born: 9 November 1990 (age 35) Brioude, France
- Height: 1.84 m (6 ft 1/2 in)
- Weight: 65 kg (143 lb; 10 st 3 lb)

Cycling career
- Sport: Cycling
- Discipline: Road
- Role: Rider
- Rider type: Climber

Amateur teams
- 2000–2008: Vélo Sport Brivadois
- 2009: CR4C Roanne
- 2010–2011: Chambéry CF

Professional teams
- 2012–2020: Ag2r–La Mondiale
- 2021–2025: Team DSM

Major wins
- Grand Tours Tour de France Mountains classification (2019) 4 individual stages (2015, 2016, 2017, 2024) Combativity award (2015) Vuelta a España 1 individual stage (2021) 1 TTT stage (2023) Stage races Tour of the Alps (2022)
Medal record
Representing France
Men's road bicycle racing
World Championships
Silver medal – second place	2018 Innsbruck	Road race

Romain Bardet (French pronunciation: [ʁɔmɛ̃ baʁdɛ]; born 9 November 1990) is a French former professional racing cyclist. Bardet is known for his climbing and descending abilities, which make him one of the top general classification contenders in Grand Tours. After retiring from the road in the wake of the 2025 Critérium du Dauphiné he turned to professional gravel racing.

So far in his career, his best results have primarily come on home soil. He has won a total of four stages in the Tour de France in four separate years, running from 2015 to 2017 and then in 2024; he placed in the top ten overall for five consecutive years (from 2014 to 2018) and finished on the podium twice: second overall in 2016 and third overall in 2017. He has also worn the Young rider classification jersey, and won the Mountains classification jersey in 2019 as well as the overall Combativity Award in 2015. Outside of France, he won a stage at the 2021 Vuelta a España, and won the general classification at the 2022 Tour of the Alps.

== Professional career ==
=== AG2R La Mondiale (2012–2020) ===
==== 2012–2013 ====
Bardet turned professional in 2012. He distinguished himself in that year's Tour of Turkey especially in the 3rd stage, which was a mountain affair, where he attacked relentlessly to finally take fifth place. He also finished fifth overall in the race.

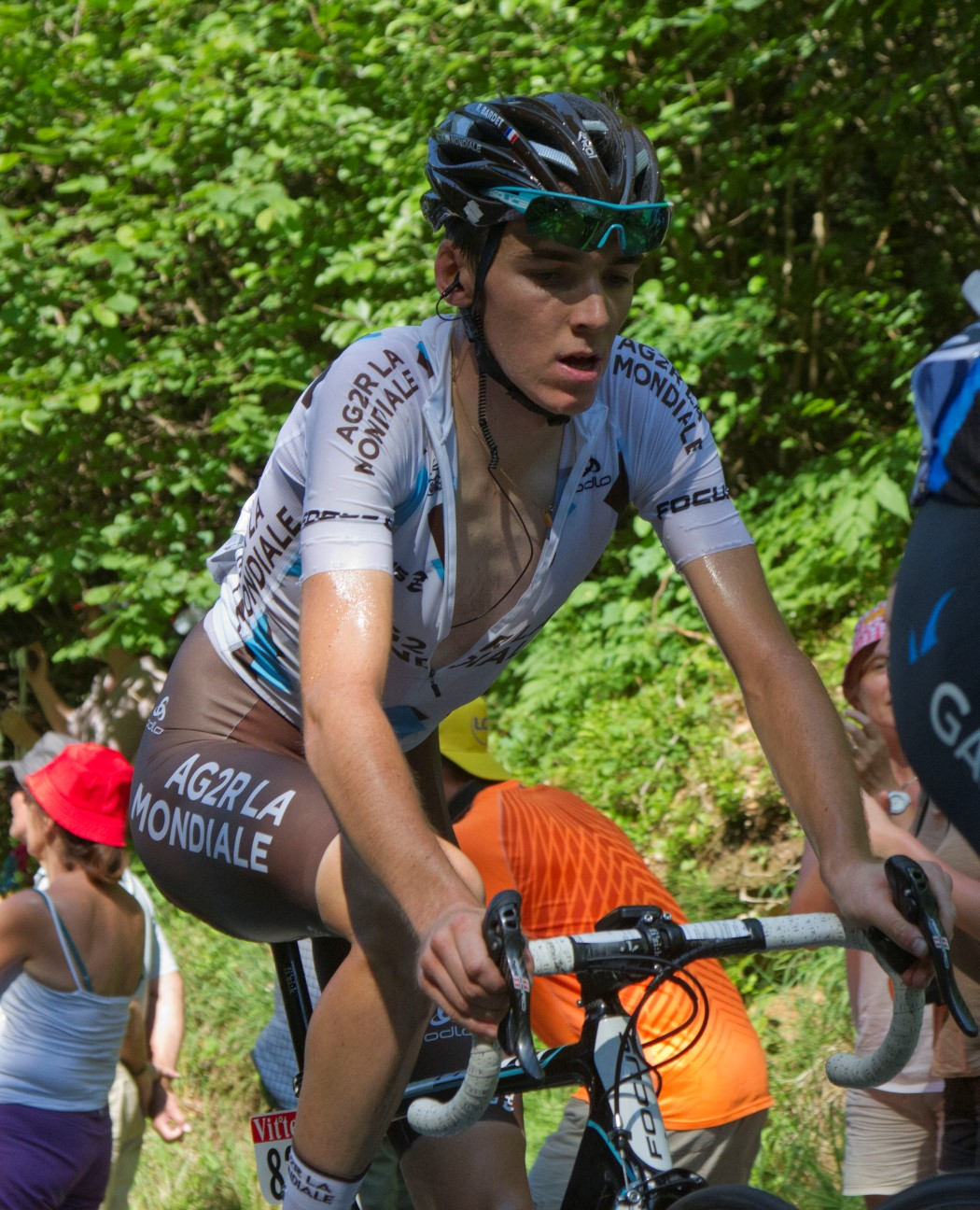
Bardet at the 2013 Tour de France

The following season, Bardet rode his first Tour de France and took his first professional victory at the Tour de l'Ain.

==== 2014 ====
His next victory came the following year when he won La Drôme Classic, his first single-day race win. Bardet finished 4th overall at the Volta a Catalunya and also rode his first Critérium du Dauphiné where he finished 5th overall. Going into the Tour de France, Bardet was team leader together with Jean-Christophe Péraud. Bardet climbed to 3rd place overall at the end of the second week, and even had a short stint in the white jersey. Despite losing his podium place in the final week, Bardet still attacked on downhill sections to potentially gain seconds on his rivals. In the end, Bardet finished 6th overall and Péraud finished 2nd overall. Thibaut Pinot (FDJ.fr) took the win in the white jersey standings, in front of Bardet in 2nd place.

==== 2015 ====
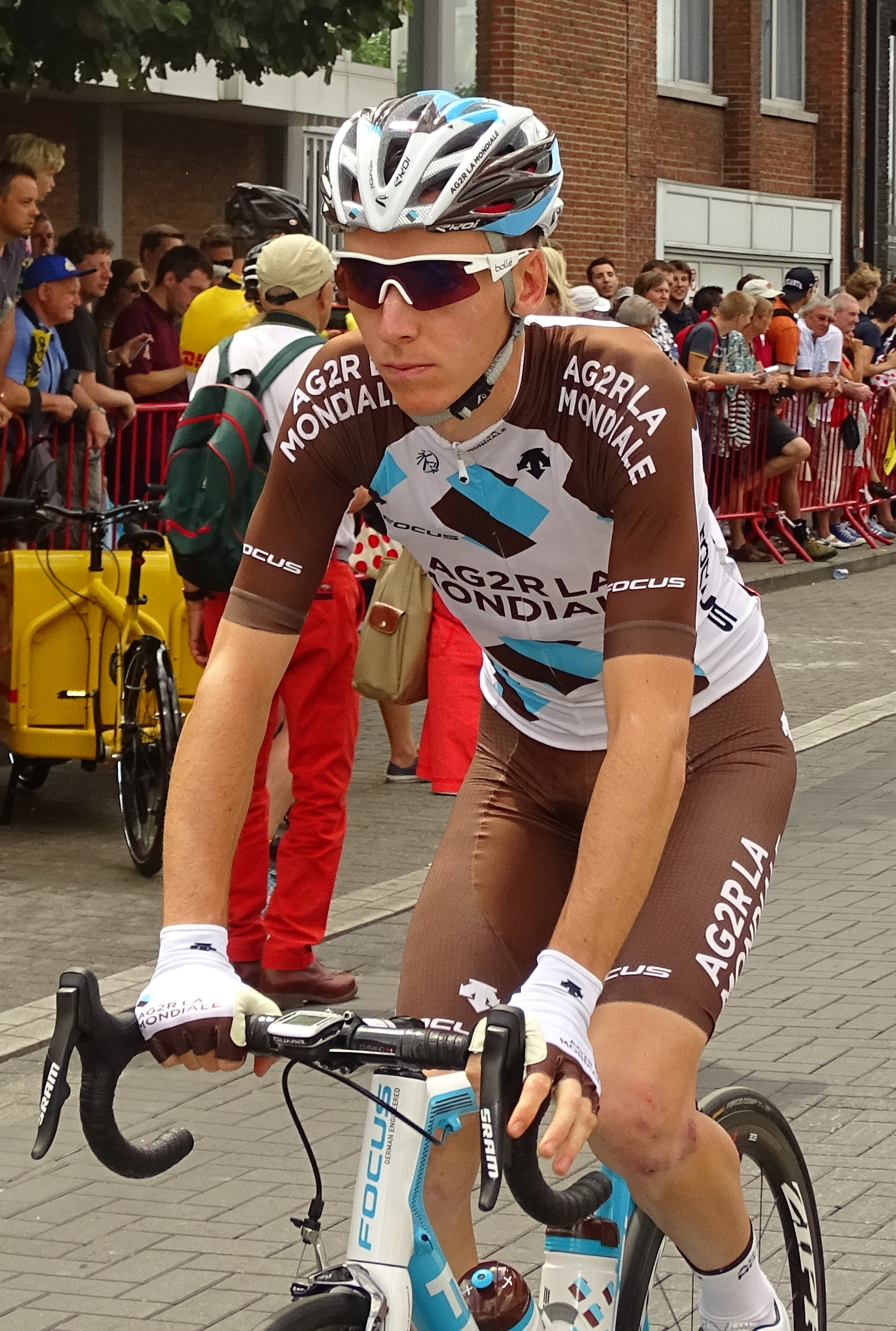
Bardet at the 2015 Tour de France

After a spring campaign which included a 6th place at Liège–Bastogne–Liège and 9th overall at the Tour de Romandie, Bardet was regarded as one of the outsiders for a podium spot in the Tour de France. In his final stage race before the Tour, the Critérium du Dauphiné, Bardet went on the attack on the downhill section before the last climb on stage 5. He gained a minute on the technical descent, then climbed up to the ski resort of Pra-Loup to win the stage solo, 36 seconds ahead of second-placed Tejay van Garderen. He went on to finish 6th overall at the race.

At the Tour de France, Bardet lost time in the crosswinds in the Netherlands and the team time trial in the first week. When the mountains finally arrived, Bardet lost even more time and with almost half of the race done, out of general classification contention. On the last day in the Pyrenees, he went into the breakaway and finished third in the stage to Plateau de Beille. Bardet and Thibaut Pinot were part of a breakaway and led over the top of the final Côte de la Croix Neuve climb of Stage 14. However, the pair were caught and overtaken by Steve Cummings (MTN–Qhubeka) on the short descent to the finish at Mende Aerodrome, and Bardet finished third in the stage. On 23 July 2015, after a solo breakaway, Bardet won Stage 18, a mountain stage for his first Tour de France stage victory. The next day, he claimed the polka dot jersey for the first time, after finishing fifth in Stage 19, another mountain stage. However, he lost the polka dot jersey to Chris Froome on Stage 20. Bardet finished in ninth place in the final general classification and won the combativity award of the Tour.

==== 2016 ====
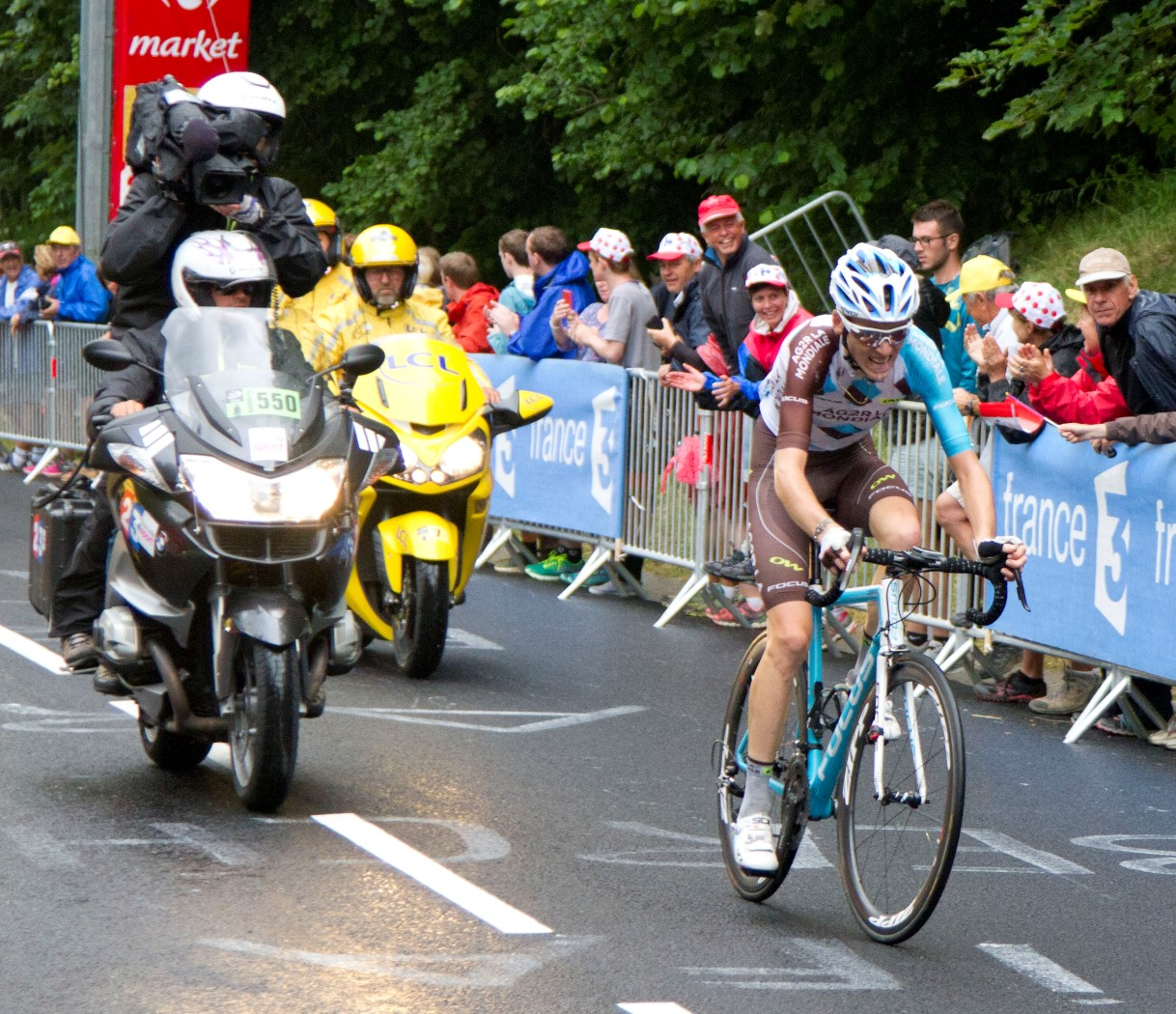
Bardet on his way to winning Stage 19 of the 2016 Tour de France

In February 2016, Bardet repeatedly attacked Vincenzo Nibali (Astana) during Stage 4 of the Tour of Oman and ultimately finished the stage in second position, 9 seconds behind him. Bardet finished the Tour of Oman second overall, 15 seconds behind Nibali. In June, Bardet attacked during Stage 6 of Critérium du Dauphiné and ultimately finished second in the stage after being outsprinted by Thibaut Pinot to the finish line in Méribel. After Stage 6, Bardet rose to third overall in the general classification, 21 seconds behind the leader Chris Froome. Bardet finished second overall in the Critérium du Dauphiné final general classification, 12 seconds behind Froome.

On Stage 19 of the Tour de France, Bardet and his team mate Mikaël Cherel attacked together on a wet descent before the penultimate climb. Bardet escaped the yellow jersey group on the lower slopes of Mont Blanc with 10 kilometres (6.2 miles) to go. Bardet caught the breakaway survivor Rui Costa with 7 kilometres (4.3 miles) to go, dropped him on the steepest pitches of the final climb with 3.2 kilometres (2.0 miles) remaining and won the stage by 23 seconds over second-placed Joaquim Rodríguez; ultimately, he was the only Frenchman to win a stage in the 2016 Tour de France. After winning Stage 19, Bardet rose from fifth to second overall in the general classification. He finished the Tour in second position in the final general classification, 4:05 behind Chris Froome, becoming the sixth Frenchman to finish in the top three in the final general classification over the previous 30 editions; the other five were Pinot and Jean-Christophe Péraud (both 2014), Richard Virenque (1996, 1997), Laurent Fignon (1989) and Jean-François Bernard (1987).

Bardet was selected to represent France at the Summer Olympics in the individual road race, finishing 24th.

==== 2017 ====
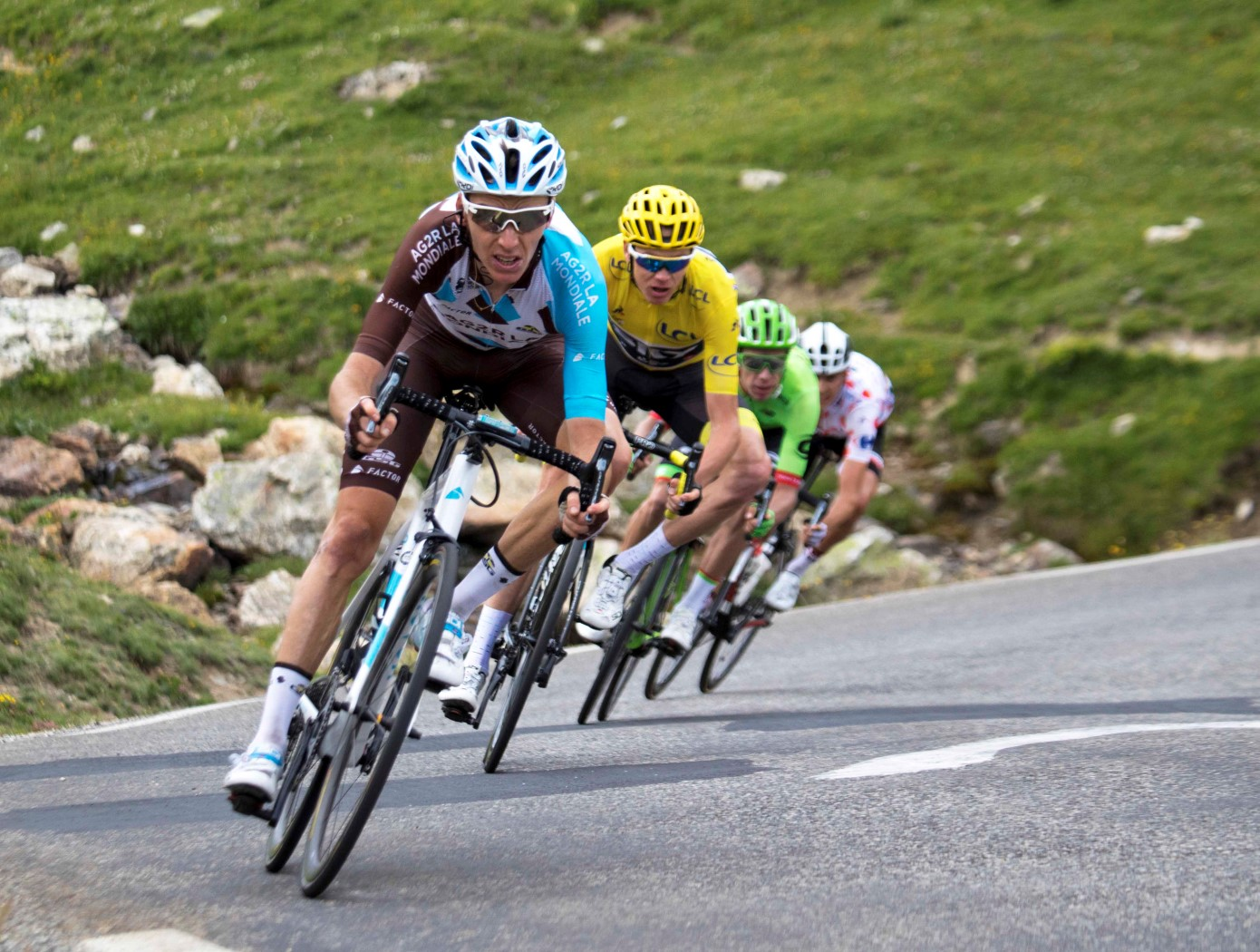
Bardet leading Chris Froome, Rigoberto Urán and Warren Barguil during a descent at the 2017 Tour de France

After crashing on stage 1 of Paris–Nice, Bardet was thrown out of the race after he had been towed by his team car. Bardet won stage 12 of the Tour de France, with an acceleration near the finishing line in Peyragudes in the French Pyrenees, going clear with less than 500 metres (1,600 feet) to go to take his third stage win in as many years. Bardet struggled throughout the penultimate stage, a 22.5-kilometre (14.0-mile) individual time trial, that started and finished in Marseille; he finished in 52nd position, 2 minutes 3 seconds behind its winner Maciej Bodnar. Bardet dropped from second to third in the general classification going into the final stage, with a one-second lead over fourth-placed Mikel Landa. Bardet managed to hold on to his advantage, completing the podium behind Chris Froome and Rigoberto Urán.

==== 2018 ====
Bardet missed the Vuelta a Andalucía after injuring his right arm in a domestic accident. He returned to action with a victory in the Classic Sud-Ardèche in February. In March, Bardet rode the Strade Bianche one day classic, held partly on gravel roads in torrential rain. He broke away with the world cyclocross champion Wout van Aert and the pair led the race for much of the final 40 kilometres (25 miles) before Tiesj Benoot (Lotto–Soudal) attacked from a chasing group to catch and then drop them in the final sector of dirt roads. Benoot soloed to victory by 39 seconds ahead of Bardet, who dropped van Aert in the final kilometre. At Liège–Bastogne–Liège, Bardet finished 3rd – his first podium at a Cycling monument – after losing the 2nd place sprint to Michael Woods. When riding the Critérium du Dauphiné, Bardet never challenged for the overall win and only entered the top 3 inside the last two days.

When he arrived at the start of the Tour de France, Bardet had a troubled first week with mechanicals and punctures. He lost time on multiple occasions during the first week and was almost two minutes behind when they started the 10th stage. On stage 12 to Alpe d'Huez, Bardet attacked and rode away from the other contenders. He was later joined by Chris Froome, Geraint Thomas and Tom Dumoulin, but decided to test the contenders with numerous accelerations. He ended the stage in 3rd place and rose to 6th place in the general classification. With Bardet only being 8th in the general classification before stage 19, he and several other contenders attacked on the Col du Tourmalet with almost 100 kilometres (62 miles) to the finish line. Despite being caught on the last climb, Bardet finished third in the sprint to the finish line. He moved up to a final placing of sixth overall after the penultimate stage, an individual time trial – his fifth consecutive top-ten finish at the race.

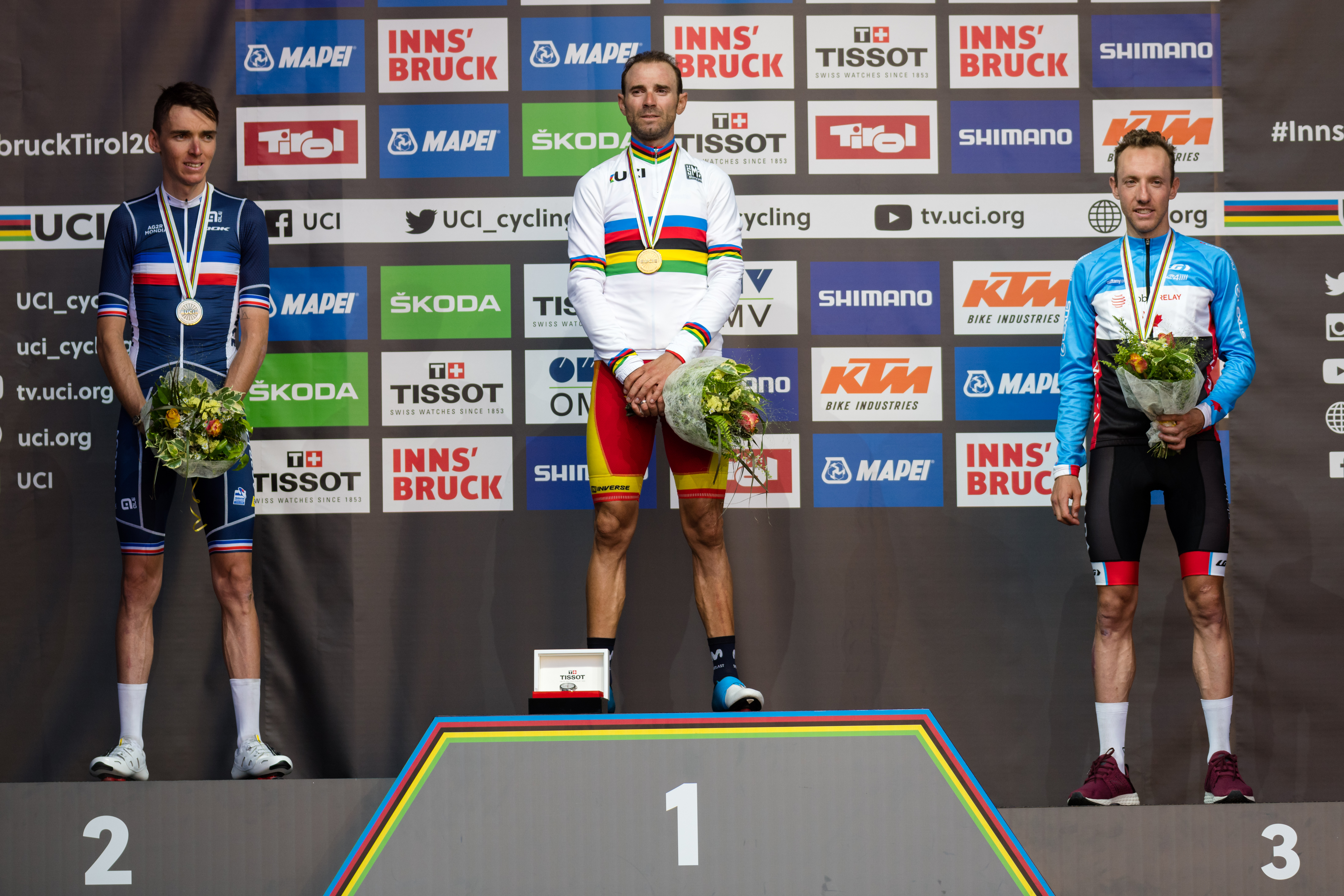
Bardet (left) on the podium at the 2018 UCI Road World Championships

In September, Bardet finished 2nd in the road race at the UCI Road World Championships, after having attacked with Alejandro Valverde (Spain) and Canada's Woods. The group was later joined by Tom Dumoulin (Netherlands) inside the last kilometres. Valverde started the sprint with almost 200 metres (660 feet) to the finish line but Bardet never looked like a serious challenge and had to settle with 2nd place.

==== 2019 ====
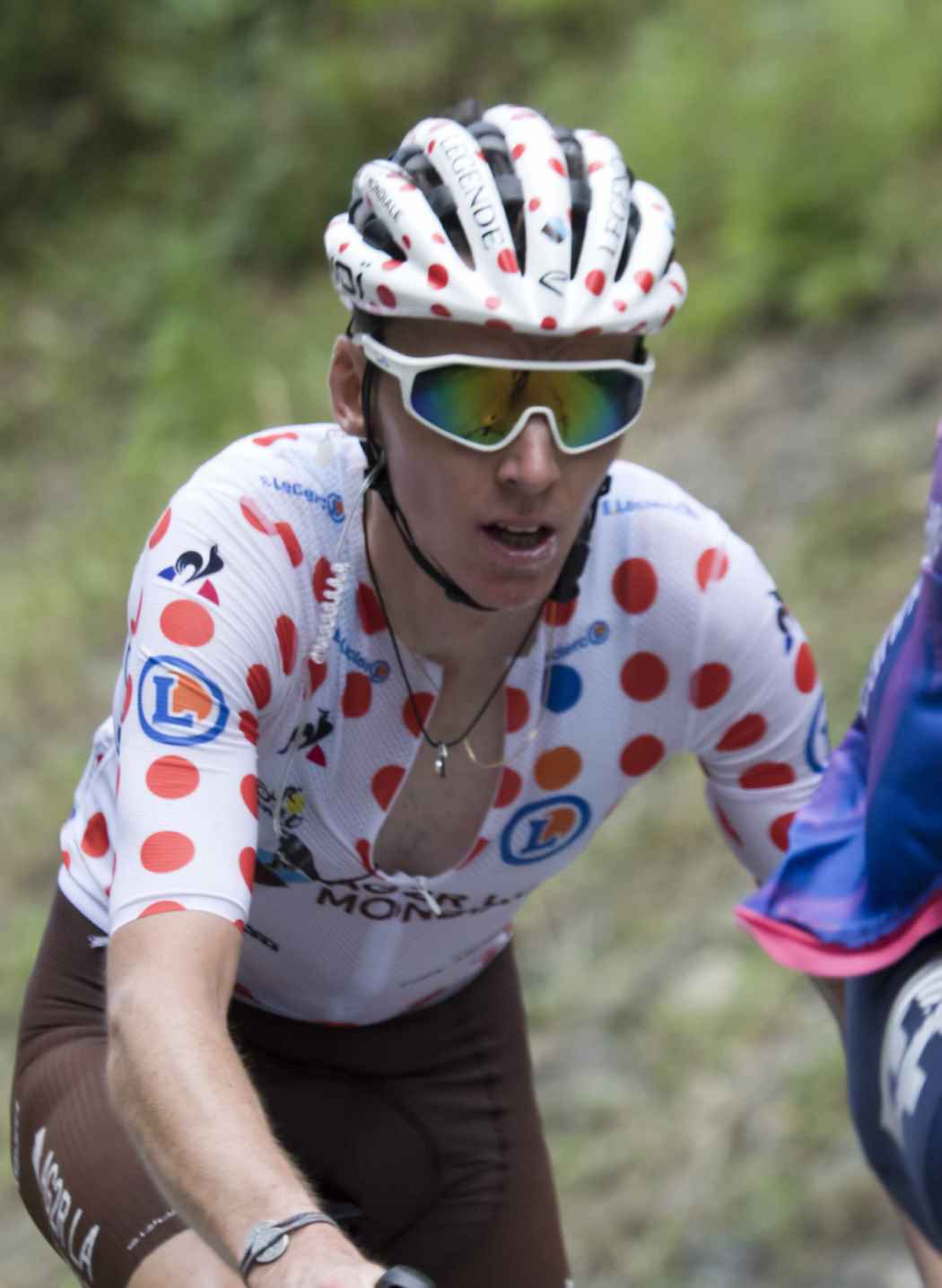
Bardet at the 2019 Tour de France wearing the Polka dot jersey

Bardet started his 2019 season with a block of racing in France, finishing second overall at the Tour du Haut Var, losing out to Thibaut Pinot on the final stage, which ended with a summit finish at Mont Faron. He then finished fourth in the Classic Sud-Ardèche, seventh at La Drôme Classic and fifth overall at Paris–Nice. In preparation for the Tour de France, Bardet contested the Critérium du Dauphiné, finishing in tenth place overall, and was second to Jesús Herrada in the inaugural Mont Ventoux Dénivelé Challenge, which finished atop Mont Ventoux. At the Tour de France, Bardet lost more than 20 minutes on stage 14 – which finished at the Col du Tourmalet – which removed him from overall contention. He then shifted his focus to attempting to winning stages from the breakaway, but his best result was a second-place finish on stage eighteen, won by Nairo Quintana. However, Bardet did take the lead of the mountains classification, holding the polka-dot jersey for the remainder of the race. He ended his season following the Tour de France, stating that he needed to "regenerate".

==== 2020 ====
Bardet contested four races in the early part of 2020, prior to the COVID-19 pandemic-enforced suspension of racing, with his best result being second overall at the Tour des Alpes-Maritimes et du Var. Following the resumption of racing, Bardet contested only races in France for the remainder of the season, with the exception of Brabantse Pijl and the Tour of Flanders held in Belgium in October. He ran as high as fourth overall in the Tour de France, but withdrew ahead of the fourteenth stage following a crash, which left him with a concussion and a "small haemorrhage".

=== Team DSM (2021–present) ===
In August 2020, Bardet signed an initial two-year contract with Team Sunweb, later renamed Team DSM, from the 2021 season, and team dsm-firmenich, from the 2023 season.

==== 2021 ====
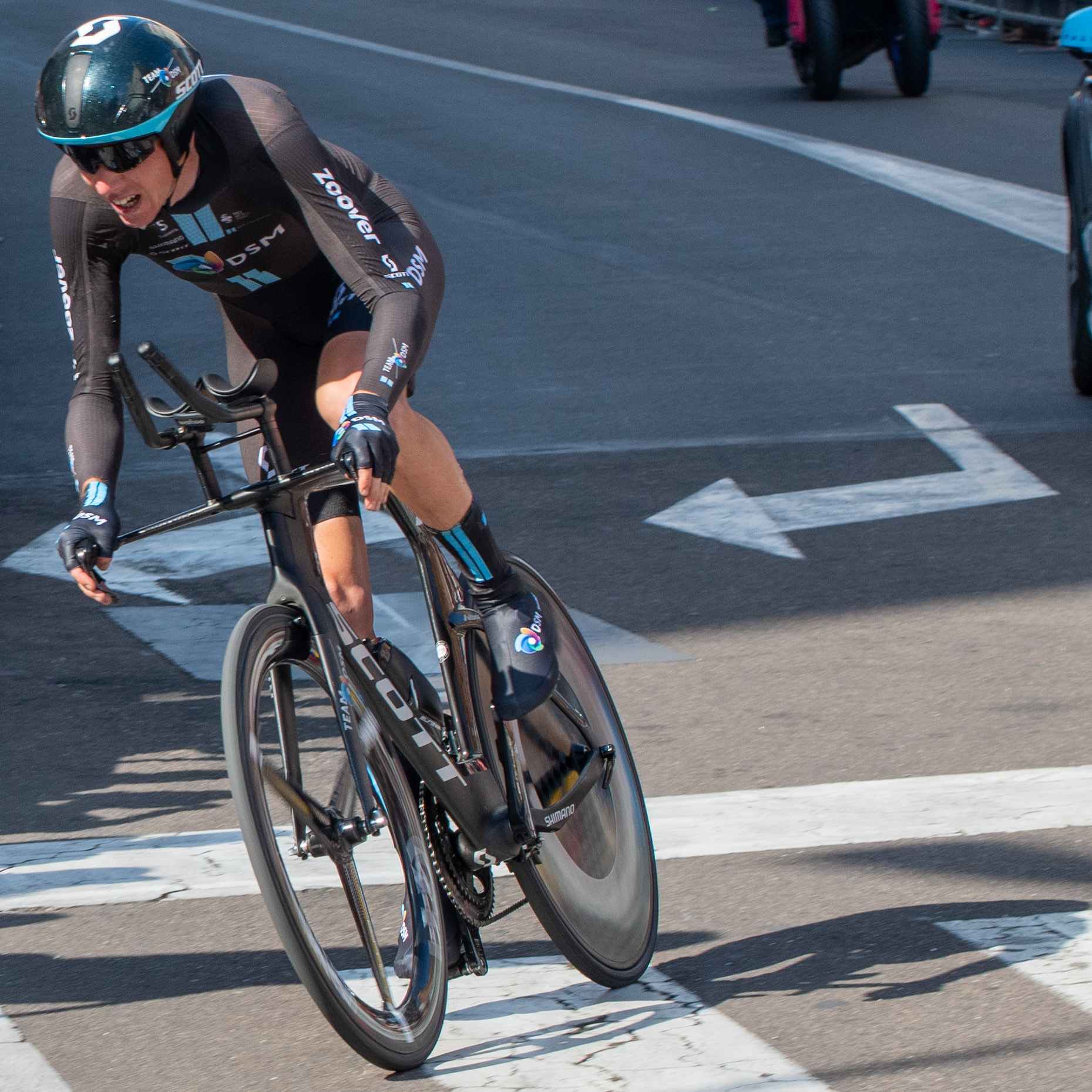
Bardet made his first start at the Giro d'Italia in 2021, finishing seventh overall

Bardet made his first start at the Giro d'Italia, sharing team leadership with Jai Hindley, the 2020 runner-up. Bardet made his way up the general classification, moving into the top ten overall after stage 14, finishing at the Monte Zoncolan. He finished second to Egan Bernal on stage 16, and moved up to fifth place overall on the penultimate stage, following a fourth-place stage finish. However, he fell to seventh in the general classification during the final-day individual time trial, dropping behind Daniel Martínez and João Almeida. Bardet also rode into the leader's jersey at the Vuelta a Burgos, a preparation race for the Vuelta a España. In spite of his crash on the descent of the Picón Blanco climb, he won the third stage solo to Espinosa de los Monteros, his first in over three years. He held a 45-second lead over Mikel Landa heading into the final stage, but he lost the race lead to Landa after cracking in the final 3 kilometres (1.9 miles) of the stage; he ultimately finished sixth overall, and won the mountains classification.

On stage 5 of the Vuelta a España, Bardet crashed and lost over twelve minutes; he lost a further thirteen minutes the following day, removing him from overall contention. On stage 14, he was involved in the breakaway; he chased down several counter-attacks, and went clear with 6 kilometres (3.7 miles) to go. He then rode solo to the summit finish at Pico Villuercas to claim the stage win, 44 seconds ahead of Jesús Herrada. Bardet held the mountains classification for four days, before the lead passed to his teammate Michael Storer. Bardet and Storer also made it into the breakaway on the penultimate stage; Storer mathematically sealed the mountains jersey ahead of the final time trial, while Bardet finished second in the standings.

==== 2022 ====
Prior to the Giro d'Italia, Bardet took the overall victory at the Tour of the Alps, his first general classification win since the 2013 Tour de l'Ain. With Jai Hindley having moved to Bora–Hansgrohe, Bardet had outright team leadership at Team DSM for the Giro d'Italia, and during the race, he signed a two-year contract extension with the team. In the ninth stage, Bardet finished second to Hindley on a summit finish at Blockhaus, moving up to third place overall. He lost a place to Richard Carapaz a couple of stages later, and was out of the race altogether by the end of stage thirteen, abandoning the race due to sickness.

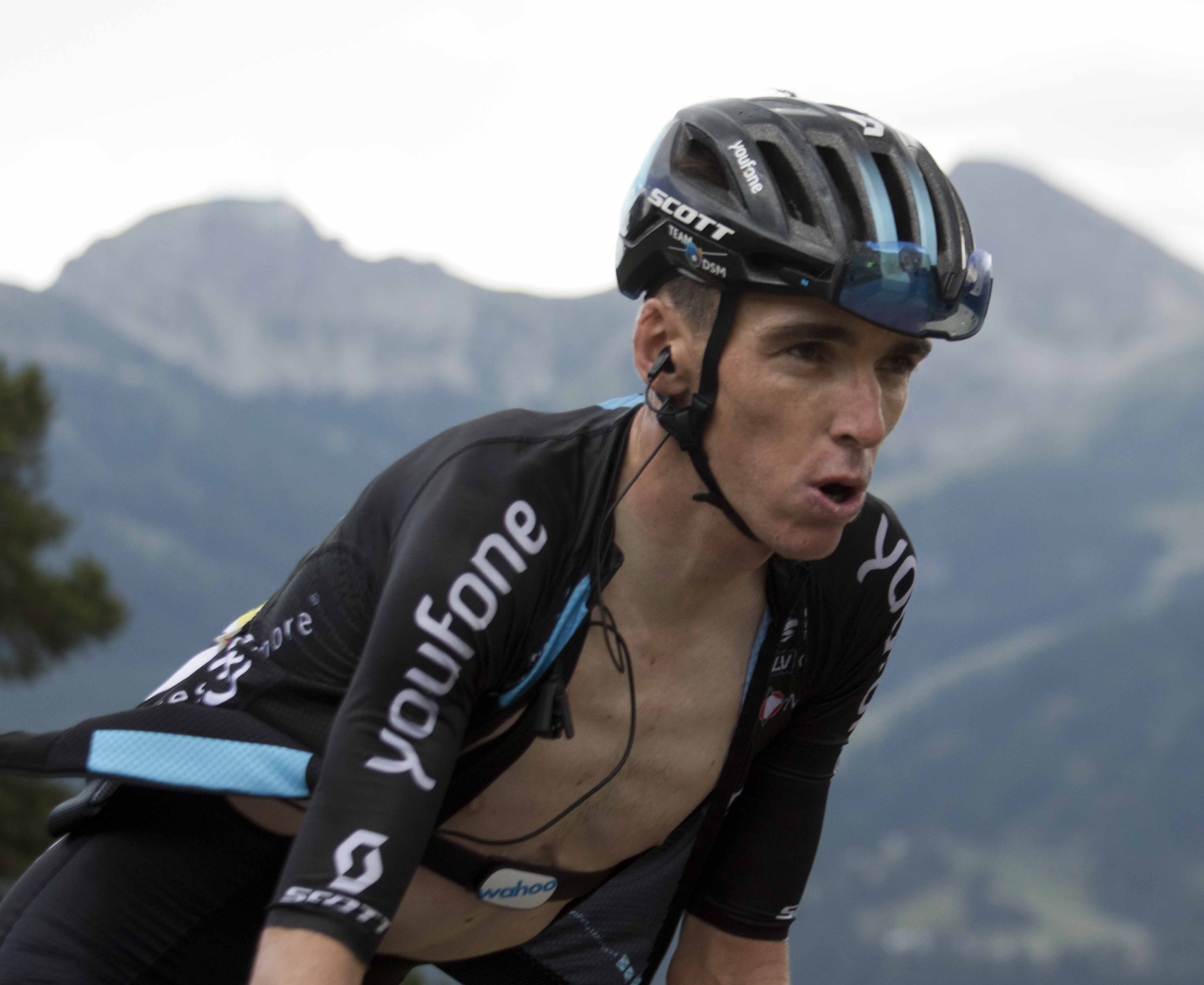
Bardet at the 2022 Tour de France

His next start was at the Tour de France, where he finished in the top-three on the eleventh stage, which finished at the Col du Granon; he moved up to second overall behind Jonas Vingegaard following the stage. He lost almost 20 seconds to Vingegaard, Geraint Thomas and Tadej Pogačar the following day, as he dropped from second to fourth on Bastille Day. He lost more than three minutes on stage sixteen, dropping to ninth overall; he yo-yoed around the lower half of the top-ten placings for the remainder of the race, finishing seventh overall on the road, before being promoted to sixth with Nairo Quintana's disqualification.

==== 2023 ====
Bardet started his season with top-ten overall finishes at the Tour des Alpes-Maritimes et du Var and Paris–Nice stage races – finishing eighth and seventh respectively – and also finished in ninth place at La Flèche Wallonne. At the Tour de Romandie, Bardet finished third on a hilly second stage, and ultimately finished in seventh overall. He contested the Tour de Suisse for the first time, where he recorded three top-ten stage finishes, and finished fifth overall.

==== 2024 ====
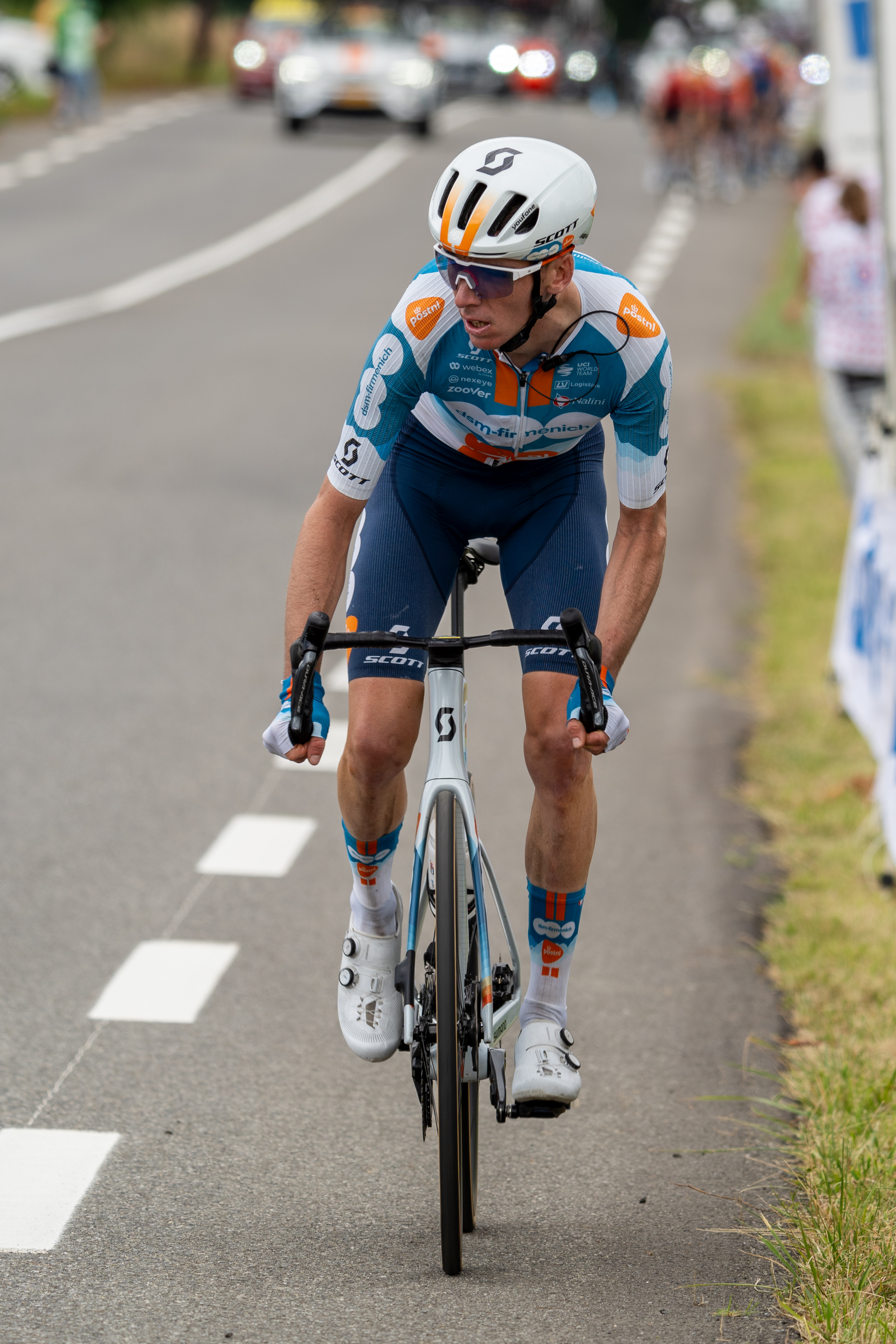
Bardet at the 2024 Tour de France

Bardet opened the 2024 season with a third place in the Classic Var in February. In late April, he finished second to Tadej Pogačar in Liège–Bastogne–Liège. He next competed in the Giro d'Italia, finishing second on stage 10 and 9th overall.

In late June, Bardet won his fourth career Tour de France stage on the first day of the race, holding off the chasing peloton by five seconds with teammate Frank van den Broek. This also marked the only time in his career that he would hold the Tour de France Yellow Jersey.

=== 2025 ===
Following the conclusion of the 2025 Critérium du Dauphiné, Bardet retired from professional road cycling.

After retiring from road cycling, Bardet extended his contract with Team Picnic–PostNL and announced that he intends to race the remainder of the 2025 season and the 2026 season on gravel.

== Personal life ==
Bardet lives in Clermont-Ferrand. Alongside his professional cycling career, he began business studies in 2011, in the grande école program adapted to high-level athletes in Grenoble School of Management.

== Career achievements ==
=== Major results ===
2009
5th Overall Tour des Pays de Savoie
2010
6th Overall Tour de l'Avenir
8th Overall Tour des Pays de Savoie
8th Overall Giro delle Regioni
9th Overall Ronde de l'Isard

1st Stage 4

10th Piccolo Giro di Lombardia
2011
1st Stage 5 Tour de l'Avenir
2nd Overall Tour des Pays de Savoie

1st Stages 2 & 3

2nd Liège–Bastogne–Liège Espoirs
4th UCI Under 23 Nations' Cup
4th Overall Ronde de l'Isard
6th Overall Giro della Regione Friuli Venezia Giulia
9th Gran Premio Palio del Recioto
2012
5th Overall Tour of Turkey
2013 (1 pro win)
1st Overall Tour de l'Ain

1st Points classification

3rd Les Boucles du Sud Ardèche
4th Overall Route du Sud
5th Overall Tour of Beijing

1st Young rider classification

7th Overall Étoile de Bessèges
Combativity award Stage 9 Tour de France
2014 (1)
1st La Drôme Classic
1st Young rider classification, Tour of Oman
2nd Overall Tour de l'Ain
4th Overall Volta a Catalunya
4th Classic Sud-Ardèche
5th Overall Critérium du Dauphiné
5th Grand Prix Cycliste de Montréal
6th Overall Tour de France

Held after Stages 10–15
Combativity award Stage 17

10th Grand Prix d'Ouverture La Marseillaise
10th Paris–Camembert
10th Liège–Bastogne–Liège
2015 (2)
3rd International Road Cycling Challenge
5th Overall Vuelta a Andalucía
6th Overall Critérium du Dauphiné

1st Stage 5

6th Liège–Bastogne–Liège
7th Grand Prix Cycliste de Montréal
9th Overall Giro del Trentino
9th Overall Tour de Romandie
9th Overall Tour de France

1st Stage 18
Combativity award Stage 18 & Overall
Held after Stage 19

2016 (1)
2nd Overall Tour de France

1st Stage 19

2nd Overall Tour of Oman
2nd Overall Critérium du Dauphiné
2nd Giro dell'Emilia
4th Giro di Lombardia
5th Classic Sud-Ardèche
6th Overall Volta a Catalunya
6th Overall Giro del Trentino
8th UCI World Tour
8th La Drôme Classic
9th Overall Paris–Nice
9th Milano–Torino
2017 (1)
3rd Overall Tour de France

1st Stage 12

6th Overall Critérium du Dauphiné
6th Liège–Bastogne–Liège
10th Overall Volta a Catalunya
Combativity award Stage 11 Vuelta a España
2018 (1)
1st Classic de l'Ardèche
2nd Road race, UCI Road World Championships
2nd Strade Bianche
2nd Tour du Finistère
2nd Giro della Toscana
3rd Overall Critérium du Dauphiné
3rd Liège–Bastogne–Liège
6th Overall Tour de France
6th Giro dell'Emilia
8th Overall Deutschland Tour
8th La Drôme Classic
8th Grand Prix La Marseillaise
9th La Flèche Wallonne
2019
1st Mountains classification, Tour de France
2nd Overall Tour du Haut Var
2nd Mont Ventoux Dénivelé Challenge
4th Classic Sud-Ardèche
5th Overall Paris–Nice
7th La Drôme Classic
9th Amstel Gold Race
10th Overall Critérium du Dauphiné
2020
2nd Overall Tour des Alpes-Maritimes et du Var
6th Overall Critérium du Dauphiné
7th Paris–Tours
8th Overall Route d'Occitanie
2021 (2)
Vuelta a España

1st Stage 14
Held after Stage 14–17

5th Overall Giro di Sicilia
6th Overall Vuelta a Burgos

1st Mountains classification
1st Stage 3

7th Overall Giro d'Italia
8th Overall Tirreno–Adriatico
8th Giro di Lombardia
9th Overall Tour of the Alps
2022 (1)
1st Overall Tour of the Alps
6th Overall Tour de France
8th Grand Prix Cycliste de Montréal
9th Overall UAE Tour
9th Giro di Lombardia
2023
1st Stage 1 (TTT) Vuelta a España
5th Overall Tour de Suisse
7th Overall Paris–Nice
7th Overall Tour de Romandie
8th Overall Tour des Alpes-Maritimes et du Var
9th La Flèche Wallonne
2024 (1)
Tour de France

1st Stage 1
Held after Stage 1

2nd Liège–Bastogne–Liège
3rd Classic Var
5th Overall Tour of the Alps
9th Overall Giro d'Italia

Combativity award Stage 8

10th Road race, UCI Road World Championships
Gravel
2025
UCI World Series

1st Fubine
1st Les Angles

10th Overall Tour of the Alps
2026
UCI World Series

1st Lucena del Cid
1st Monaco

1st McLaren Vale
2nd Overall Santa Vall

==== General classification results timeline ====
Grand Tour general classification results
Grand Tour	2012	2013	2014	2015	2016	2017	2018	2019	2020	2021	2022	2023	2024	2025
Giro d'Italia	—	—	—	—	—	—	—	—	—	7	DNF	—	9	26
Tour de France	—	15	6	9	2	3	6	15	DNF	—	6	DNF	30	—
Vuelta a España	—	—	—	—	—	17	—	—	—	25	—	21	—	—
Major stage race general classification results
Race	2012	2013	2014	2015	2016	2017	2018	2019	2020	2021	2022	2023	2024	2025
Paris–Nice	—	27	36	14	9	DSQ	—	5	19	—	—	7	—	—
Tirreno–Adriatico	—	—	—	—	—	—	13	—	—	8	12	—	DNF	—
Volta a Catalunya	40	—	4	DNF	6	10	—	DNF	NH	—	—	DNF	—	—
Tour of the Basque Country	—	53	—	—	—	15	13	—	NH	—	—	—	—	—
Tour de Romandie	—	—	—	9	27	—	—	—	NH	—	—	7	—	—
Critérium du Dauphiné	—	—	5	6	2	6	3	10	6	—	—	—	—	26
Tour de Suisse	—	—	—	—	—	—	—	—	NH	—	—	5	—	—

==== Classics results timeline ====
Monument	2012	2013	2014	2015	2016	2017	2018	2019	2020	2021	2022	2023	2024	2025
Milan–San Remo	—	17	—	—	—	—	—	50	—	27	—	—	—	—
Tour of Flanders	—	—	—	—	—	—	—	—	25	—	—	—	—	—
Paris–Roubaix	Did not contest during his career													
Liège–Bastogne–Liège	—	13	10	6	13	6	3	21	—	—	DNF	15	2	82
Giro di Lombardia	29	—	11	17	4	—	DNF	—	—	8	9	11	—	—
Classic	2012	2013	2014	2015	2016	2017	2018	2019	2020	2021	2022	2023	2024	2025
Strade Bianche	—	—	—	—	—	—	2	—	—	20	—	—	17	—
Brabantse Pijl	—	—	—	20	—	—	—	—	27	—	—	—	—	—
Amstel Gold Race	25	48	33	—	—	—	—	9	NH	—	—	—	—	—
La Flèche Wallonne	29	111	35	—	—	13	9	13	—	—	—	9	—	—
Clásica de San Sebastián	33	20	18	84	—	—	—	—	NH	—	—	38	DNF	—
Grand Prix Cycliste de Québec	56	107	24	35	22	—	—	—	Not held		20	—	90	—
Grand Prix Cycliste de Montréal	22	16	5	7	20	—	—	—	Not held		8	—	11	—
Milano–Torino	43	—	—	11	9	—	—	—	—	—	—	—	—	—
Paris–Tours	—	—	—	—	—	—	—	—	7	—	—	—	—	—

==== Major championships timeline ====
Event		2012	2013	2014	2015	2016	2017	2018	2019	2020	2021	2022	2023	2024
Olympic Games	Road race	—	Not held			24	Not held				—	Not held		—
World Championships	Road race	—	28	62	—	—	—	2	—	—	—	22	—	10
National Championships	Road race	74	34	37	11	10	—	—	—	10	—	—	—	—

Legend
—	Did not compete
DNF	Did not finish
DSQ	Disqualified
IP	In progress
NH	Not held

=== Awards ===
- Vélo d'Or français: 2016, 2017
