= 2024 Ardèche Classic =

2024 Faun-Ardèche Classic
2024 UCI ProSeries
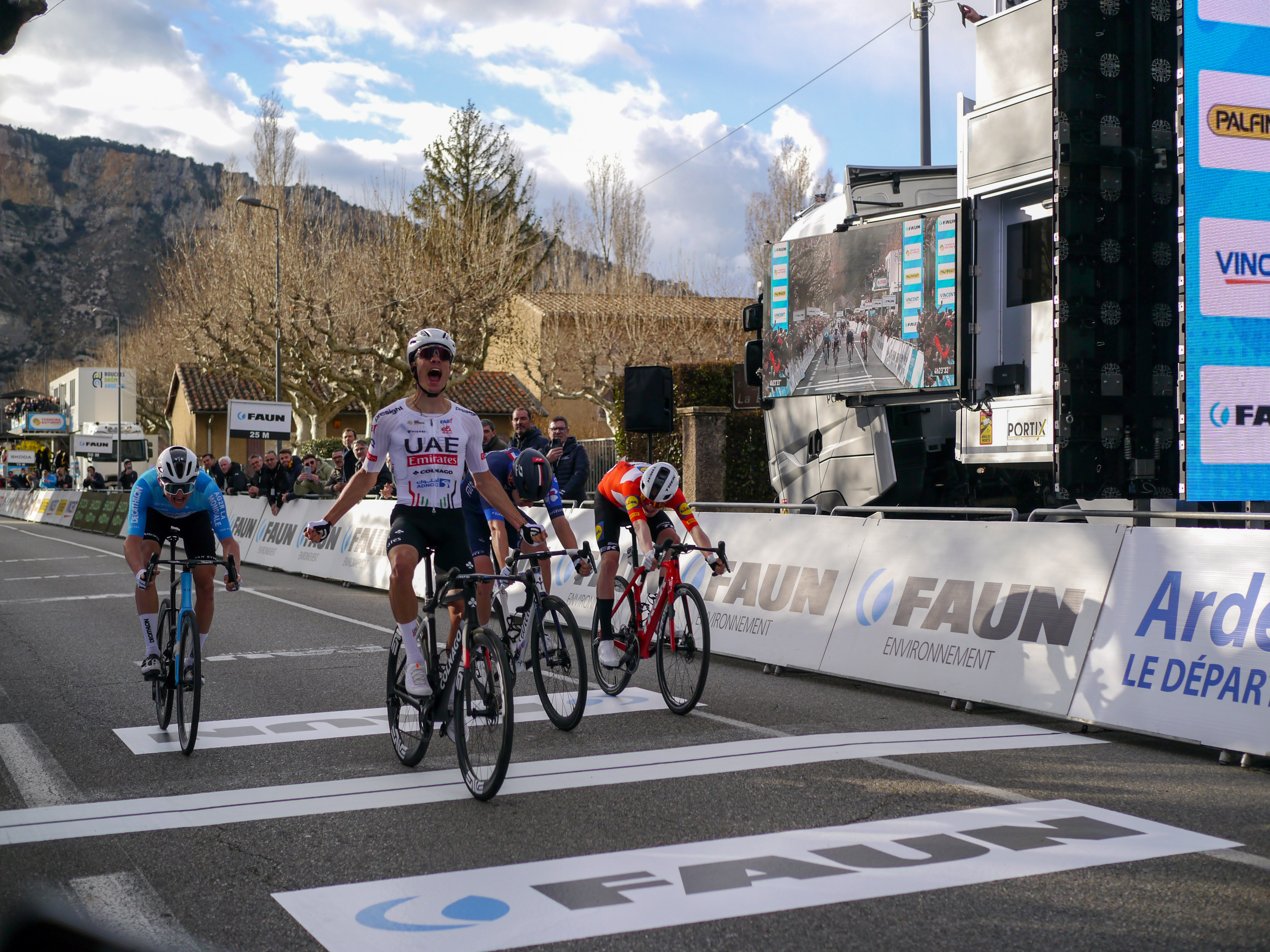
- Ayuso winning the four-man sprint to take victory

Race details
- Dates: 24 February 2024
- Stages: 1
- Distance: 168.6 km (104.8 mi)
- Winning time: 4h 23' 34"

Results
	Winner	Juan Ayuso (ESP)	(UAE Team Emirates)
	Second	Romain Grégoire (FRA)	(Groupama–FDJ)
	Third	Mattias Skjelmose (DEN)	(Lidl–Trek)

The 2024 Faun-Ardèche Classic was the 24th edition of the Classic Sud-Ardèche cycle race. It was held on 24 February 2024 as a category 1.Pro race on the 2024 UCI ProSeries calendar. The race started and finished in Guilherand-Granges. The race was won by Juan Ayuso of UAE Team Emirates in a four-man sprint.

== Teams ==
Eighteen teams of up to seven riders started the race, which included nine UCI WorldTeams, six UCI ProTeams, and three UCI Continental teams. 93 riders finished out of the 120 who entered the race.

UCI WorldTeams

- Arkéa–B&B Hotels
- Cofidis
- Decathlon–AG2R La Mondiale
- Groupama–FDJ
- Intermarché–Wanty
- Lidl–Trek
- Soudal–Quick-Step
- Team dsm–firmenich PostNL
- UAE Team Emirates

UCI ProTeams

- Bingoal WB
- Israel–Premier Tech
- Lotto–Dstny
- Team TotalEnergies
- Tudor Pro Cycling Team
- Uno-X Mobility

UCI Continental Teams

- CIC U Nantes Atlantique
- Nice Métropole Côte d'Azur
- Van Rysel–Roubaix

== Result ==
Result
Rank	Rider	Team	Time
1	Juan Ayuso (ESP)	UAE Team Emirates	4h 23' 34"
2	Romain Grégoire (FRA)	Groupama–FDJ	+ 0"
3	Mattias Skjelmose (DEN)	Lidl–Trek	+ 0"
4	Felix Gall (AUT)	Decathlon–AG2R La Mondiale	+ 0"
5	Maxim Van Gils (BEL)	Lotto–Dstny	+ 4"
6	Kevin Vermaerke (USA)	Team dsm–firmenich PostNL	+ 4"
7	Lorenzo Rota (ITA)	Intermarché–Wanty	+ 4"
8	Jordan Jegat (FRA)	Team TotalEnergies	+ 4"
9	Aurélien Paret-Peintre (FRA)	Decathlon–AG2R La Mondiale	+ 4"
10	Igor Arrieta (ESP)	UAE Team Emirates	+ 4"
