= 2025 Ardèche Classic =

Faun-Ardèche Classic 2025

2025 Faun-Ardèche Classic
2025 UCI ProSeries

Race details
- Dates: 1 March 2025
- Stages: 1
- Distance: 165.9 km (103.1 mi)
- Winning time: 4h 13' 22"

Results
	Winner	Romain Grégoire (FRA)	(Groupama–FDJ)
	Second	Marco Brenner (GER)	(Tudor Pro Cycling Team)
	Third	Lorenzo Fortunato (ITA)	(XDS Astana Team)

The 2025 Faun-Ardèche Classic was the 25th edition of the Classic Sud-Ardèche cycle race. It was held on 1 March 2025 as a category 1.Pro race on the 2025 UCI ProSeries calendar. The race started and finished in Guilherand-Granges.

== Teams ==
Twenty-three teams of up to seven riders started the race, which included thirteen UCI WorldTeams, six UCI ProTeams, and four UCI Continental teams.

UCI WorldTeams

- Arkéa–B&B Hotels
- Cofidis
- Decathlon–AG2R La Mondiale
- Groupama–FDJ
- EF Education–EasyPost
- Intermarché–Wanty
- Lidl–Trek
- Movistar Team
- Soudal–Quick-Step
- Team Picnic–PostNL
- UAE Team Emirates XRG
- Visma–Lease a Bike
- XDS Astana Team

UCI ProTeams

- Israel–Premier Tech
- Lotto
- Q36.5 Pro Cycling Team
- Unibet Tietema Rockets
- Team TotalEnergies
- Tudor Pro Cycling Team

UCI Continental Teams

- CIC–U–Nantes
- Nice Métropole Côte d'Azur
- St. Michel–Preference Home–Auber93
- Van Rysel–Roubaix

== Result ==
Result
Rank	Rider	Team	Time
1	Romain Grégoire (FRA)	Groupama–FDJ	4h 13' 22"
2	Marco Brenner (GER)	Tudor Pro Cycling Team	+ 3"
3	Lorenzo Fortunato (ITA)	XDS Astana Team	+ 3"
4	Clément Champoussin (FRA)	XDS Astana Team	+ 7"
5	Christian Scaroni (ITA)	XDS Astana Team	+ 7"
6	Mattias Skjelmose (DEN)	Lidl–Trek	+ 10"
7	Javier Romo (ESP)	Movistar Team	+ 22"
8	Brandon McNulty (USA)	UAE Team Emirates XRG	+ 22"
9	Enric Mas (ESP)	Movistar Team	+ 31"
10	Juan Ayuso (ESP)	UAE Team Emirates XRG	+ 41"
