= Étoile-sur-Rhône =

- Commune
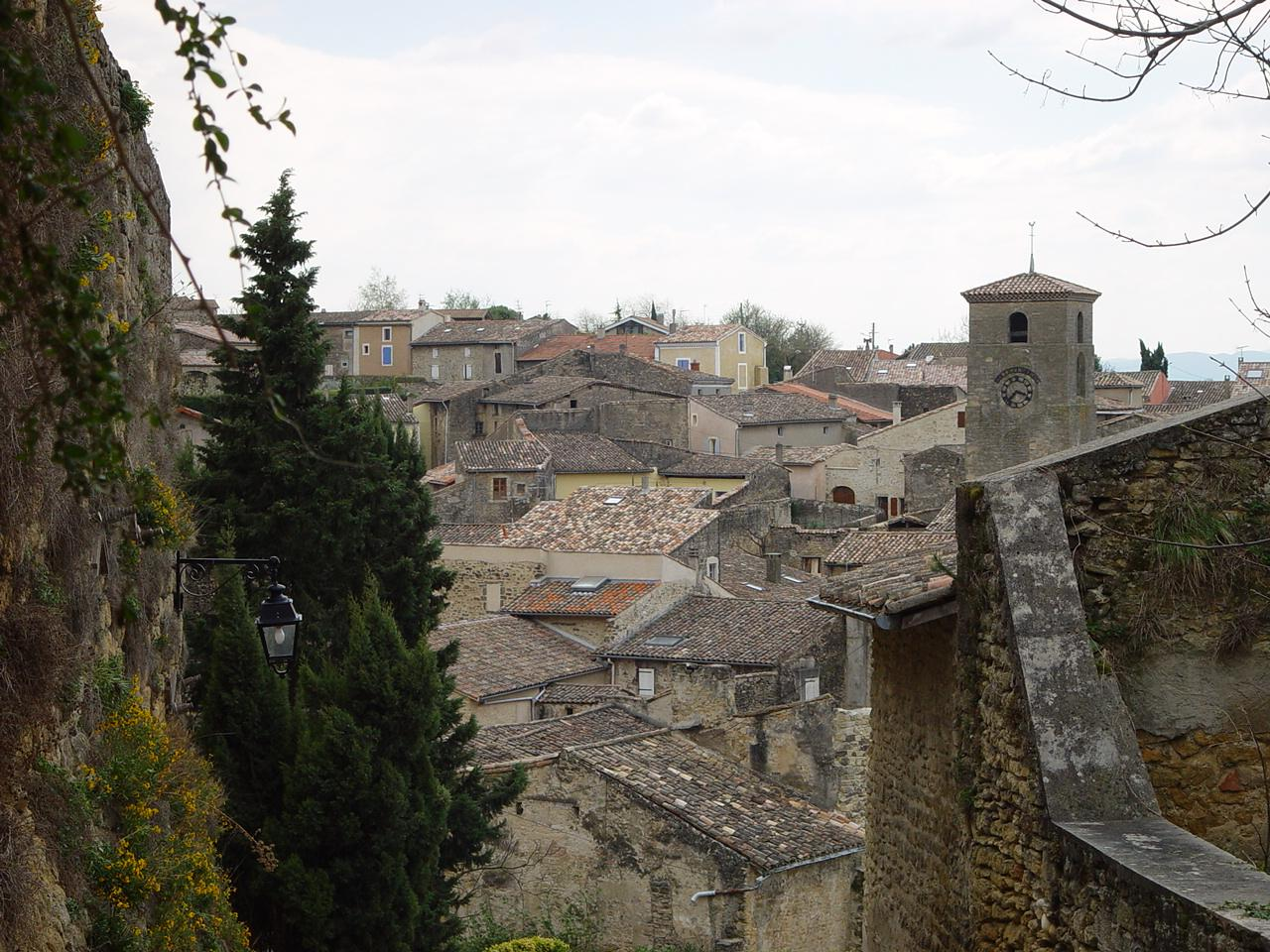
- A general view of Étoile-sur-Rhône

- Coat of arms
- Location of Étoile-sur-Rhône
- Location within France Location within Auvergne-Rhône-Alpes
- Coordinates: 44°50′16″N 4°53′40″E
- Country: France
- Region: Auvergne-Rhône-Alpes
- Department: Drôme
- Arrondissement: Valence
- Canton: Loriol-sur-Drôme
- Intercommunality: CA Valence Romans Agglo

Government
  - Mayor (2020–2026): Françoise Chazal
- Area^{1}: 42.79 km^{2} (16.52 sq mi)
- Elevation: 172 m (564 ft)
- Highest elevation: 241 m (791 ft)
- Lowest elevation: 93 m (305 ft)
- Population (2023): 5,468
  - Density: 127.8/km^{2} (331.0/sq mi)
- Time zone: UTC+01:00 (CET)
  - Summer (DST): UTC+02:00 (CEST)
- INSEE/Postal code: 26124 /26800
- ^{1} French Land Register data, which excludes lakes, ponds, glaciers > 1 km^{2} (0.386 sq mi or 247 acres) and river estuaries.

Étoile-sur-Rhône (pronounced [etwal syʁ ʁon]; Occitan: Estiala) is a commune in the Drôme department in the Auvergne-Rhône-Alpes region in southeastern France.

== Population ==
Historical population

Year	Pop.	±% p.a.
1911	2,567	—
1962	2,133	−0.36%
1968	2,268	+1.03%
1975	2,559	+1.74%
1982	2,897	+1.79%
1990	3,504	+2.41%

Year	Pop.	±% p.a.
1999	4,054	+1.63%
2007	4,471	+1.23%
2012	5,024	+2.36%
2017	5,478	+1.75%
2023	5,468	−0.03%

Source: EHESS and INSEE (1968-2023)

== See also ==
- Communes of the Drôme department
