= Ardèche Classic =

French one-day road cycling race

Race details
- Date: Late-February
- Region: Ardèche, France
- English name: Ardèche Classic
- Local name: Ardèche Classic (in French)
- Discipline: Road race
- Competition: UCI ProSeries
- Type: Single-day
- Web site: boucles-drome-ardeche.fr/index.php/faun-ardeche-classic/

History
- First edition: 2001
- Editions: 26 (as of 2026)
- First winner: Thomas Bernabeu (FRA)
- Most wins: no repeat winners
- Most recent: Paul Seixas (FRA)

Ardèche Classic (also known as the Souvenir Francis Delpech) is a road bicycle race held annually in late-February in the Ardèche department of France. The race was a National Event from its inception in 2001 until 2007, before joining the UCI Europe Tour in 2008 as a 1.2 category race and becoming a professional 1.1 race in 2010. In 2020, the race was upgraded to the UCI ProSeries calendar.

Until 2013, the race was known as Les Boucles du Sud-Ardèche, before a secondary race was added by the Ruoms Cyclisme Organisation – La Drôme Classic – to be held on the same weekend as the Classic Sud-Ardèche.

== Winners ==
Year	Country	Rider	Team
2001	France	Thomas Bernabeu	
2002	France	Tom Colas	
2003	Algeria	Hicham Menad	
2004	Moldova	Alexandre Sabalin	
2005	France	Fabien Fraissignes	
2006	France	Jean-Christophe Péraud	
2007	Russia	Evgeny Sokolov	Vendée U
2008	Latvia	Gatis Smukulis	VC La Pomme Marseille
2009	France	Freddy Bichot	Agritubel
2010	France	Christophe Riblon	Ag2r–La Mondiale
2011	France	Arthur Vichot	FDJ
2012	France	Rémi Pauriol	FDJ–BigMat
2013	France	Mathieu Drujon	BigMat–Auber 93
2014	France	Florian Vachon	Bretagne–Séché Environnement
2015	Argentina	Eduardo Sepúlveda	Bretagne–Séché Environnement
2016	Czech Republic	Petr Vakoč	Etixx–Quick-Step
2017	Italy	Mauro Finetto	Delko–Marseille Provence KTM
2018	France	Romain Bardet	AG2R La Mondiale
2019	France	Lilian Calmejane	Direct Énergie
2020	France	Rémi Cavagna	Deceuninck–Quick-Step
2021	France	David Gaudu	Groupama–FDJ
2022	United States	Brandon McNulty	UAE Team Emirates
2023	France	Julian Alaphilippe	Soudal–Quick-Step
2024	Spain	Juan Ayuso	UAE Team Emirates
2025	France	Romain Grégoire	Groupama–FDJ
2026	France	Paul Seixas	Decathlon CMA CGM

=== Wins per country ===
Wins	Country
17	France
1	Algeria; Argentina; Moldova; Czech Republic; Italy; Latvia; Russia; United States; Spain
