= 2017 UCI Cyclo-cross World Championships – Men's junior race =

Men's Junior Cyclo-cross Race
2017 UCI Cyclo-cross World Championships
- Rainbow jersey

Race details
- Dates: 28 January 2017
- Stages: 1
- Distance: 22.54 km (14.01 mi)
- Winning time: 41' 24"

Medalists
	Gold	Tom Pidcock (Great Britain)
	Silver	Dan Tulett (Great Britain)
	Bronze	Ben Turner (Great Britain)

The Men's junior race at the 2017 UCI Cyclo-cross World Championships was held on 28 January 2017 in Bieles, Luxembourg. Contenders had to be male and born in 1999 or 2000. It was won by one of the race favourites Tom Pidcock of Great Britain ahead of two compatriots.

== Race report ==
The weeks before the race temperatures had been below zero causing the soil to be frozen and slight rain the night and morning before the race caused the track to be extremely icy and slippery. This was evident right at the start as several riders took a tumble in the first turn, holding up about half the pack.

The first lap saw Maxime Bonsergent of France take an early lead, chased by a small group involving Jelle Camps, Toon Vandebosch, Ben Turner, Antoine Benoist and pre-race favorite Tom Pidcock. Pidcock was the only one succeeding to bridge the gap to Bonsergent and together they built up a lead while the rest of the pack quickly spread out and most riders were cycling alone. Already at the end of the second lap, Pidcock had broken away and built up a gap of more than 20 seconds over Bonsergent who had been caught by Ben Turner. Timo Kielich was also in the chasing group but fell hard and dropped outside the top 10. This left the group of Antoine Benoist, Loris Rouiller and Dan Tulett racing for fourth place, another 20 seconds behind Turner and Bonsergent.

Pidcock maintained and extended his lead during the race, never coming in real trouble an easily taking the victory. In the battle for the medals, Bonsergent dropped out as he fell several times and eventually after breaking his derailleur gears and losing a shoe he had to run back to the pits and would eventually finish in 20th place. Tulett caught Turner by the end of lap three and they battled it out for the remaining two medals with Tulett taking the silver in the end. Louis Rouiller came close to both British riders on the final lap but finally came eight seconds short of bronze.

== Results ==
Rank	Cyclist	Time
Gold medal	Tom Pidcock (GBR)	41' 24"
Silver medal	Dan Tulett (GBR)	+ 38"
Bronze medal	Ben Turner (GBR)	+ 44"
4	Louis Rouiller (SUI)	+ 52"
5	Antoine Benoist (FRA)	+ 1' 23"
6	Jelle Camps (BEL)	+ 1' 37"
7	Timo Kielich (BEL)	+ 1' 55"
8	Toon Vandebosch (BEL)	+ 1' 56"
9	Denzel Stephenson (USA)	+ 2' 07"
10	Niklas Markl (GER)	+ 2' 10"
11	Ryan Kamp (NED)	+ 2' 10"
12	Mauro Schmid (SUI)	+ 2' 45"
13	Erwann Kerraud (FRA)	+ 3' 11"
14	Yentl Bekaert (BEL)	+ 3' 20"
15	Jofre Cullell Estape (ESP)	+ 3' 21"
16	Jeremy Montauban (FRA)	+ 3' 30"
17	Lane Maher (USA)	+ 3' 41"
18	Tim Wollenberg (GER)	+ 3' 59"
19	Thymen Arensman (NED)	+ 4' 03"
20	Maxime Bonsergent (FRA)	+ 4' 04"
21	Jan Gavenda (CZE)	+ 4' 13"
22	Gunnar Holmgren (CAN)	+ 4' 15"
23	Wojciech Ceniuch (POL)	+ 4' 38"
24	Bart Hazekamp (NED)	+ 4' 47"
25	Brody Sanderson (CAN)	+ 4' 47"
26	Bart Artz (NED)	+ 4' 48"
27	Simon Vanicek (CZE)	+ 5' 06"
28	Mikkel Bertelsen (DEN)	+ 5' 07"
29	Erik Fetter (HUN)	+ 5' 13"
30	Kotaro Murakami (JPN)	+ 5' 18"
31	Thomas Mein (GBR)	+ 5' 43"
32	Caleb Schwartz (USA)	+ 5' 47"
33	Calder Wood (USA)	+ 6' 05"
34	Tomas Kopecky (CZE)	+ 6' 07"
35	Leonardo Cover (ITA)	+ 6' 08"
36	Ross Ellwood (USA)	+ 6' 09"
37	Radoslaw Roclawski (POL)	+ 6' 11"
38	Niklas Patino (DEN)	+ 6' 22"
39	Nicola Taffarel (ITA)	+ 6' 24"
40	Felix Schreiber (LUX)	+ 6' 30"
41	David Honzak (CZE)	+ 6' 35"
42	Ken Conter (LUX)	+ 6' 40"
43	Sam Noel (USA)	+ 7' 00"
44	Ivan Feijoo Alberte (ESP)	+ 7' 05"
45	Filippo Fontana (ITA)	+ 7' 08"
46	Noah Simms (CAN)	+ 7' 11"
47	Alberto Brancati (ITA)	+ 7' 15"
48	Misch Leyder (LUX)	+ 7' 28"
49	Bruno Marchetti (ITA)	+ 9' 30"
50	Mees Hendrikx (NED)	+ 1 lap
51	Adam Blazevic (AUS)	+ 1 lap
52	Jack Bernard Murphy (IRL)	+ 1 lap
53	Nicolas Guillemin (FRA)	+ 1 lap
54	Oliver Errebo (DEN)	+ 1 lap
55	Nicolas Kess (LUX)	+ 1 lap
56	Gustaf Darrasson (ISL)	+ 1 lap
57	Luca Bockelmann (GER)	+ 1 lap
58	Lukas Markl (GER)	+ 2 laps
59	Jakub Schierl (CZE)	+ 2 laps
60	Tristan Parrotta (LUX)	+ 2 laps
61	David Westhoff-Wittwer (GER)	+ 2 laps
62	Jakub Varhanovsky (SVK)	+ 2 laps
63	Florian Vermeersch (BEL)	+ 3 laps
	Lucas Wulff (DEN)	DNF2
	Anders Lilliendal (DEN)	DNF2
	Xabier Marias Garcia (ESP)	DNF1
	Andreas Goeman (BEL)	DNF1
