= List of mayors of Sanem =

This is a list of mayors of the Luxembourgish commune of Sanem.

== List of Mayors of Sanem ==
Name	Start	End
Dominique Charpentier	1799	1807
Nicolas Hilbert	1808	1812
Pierre Krantz	1813	1814
Philippe Krier	1815	1818
Charles Baron de Tornaco	1818	1827
Egide van Dyke	1827	1848
Jean Pretemer	1849	1861
Pierre Kremer	1861	1867
Jean Pretemer	1867	1870
Jean-Pierre Pretemer	1870	1879
Jean-Pierre Schambourg	1879	1882
Jean-Pierre Meyer	1882	1893
Nicolas Knepper	1894	1914
Jacques Batting	1915	1924
Edouard Thill	1925	1932
Pierre Greisch	1932	1934
Jean Donnersbach	1935	1937
Pierre Greisch	1937	1966
Roger Krier	1966	1980
Mathias Greisch	1980	1997
Fred Sunnen	1997	2005
Georges Engel	2005	2020
Simone Asselborn-Bintz	2020	present
