= 2024 Tour de Suisse =

Swiss cycling race

2024 UCI World Tour, race 24 of 35
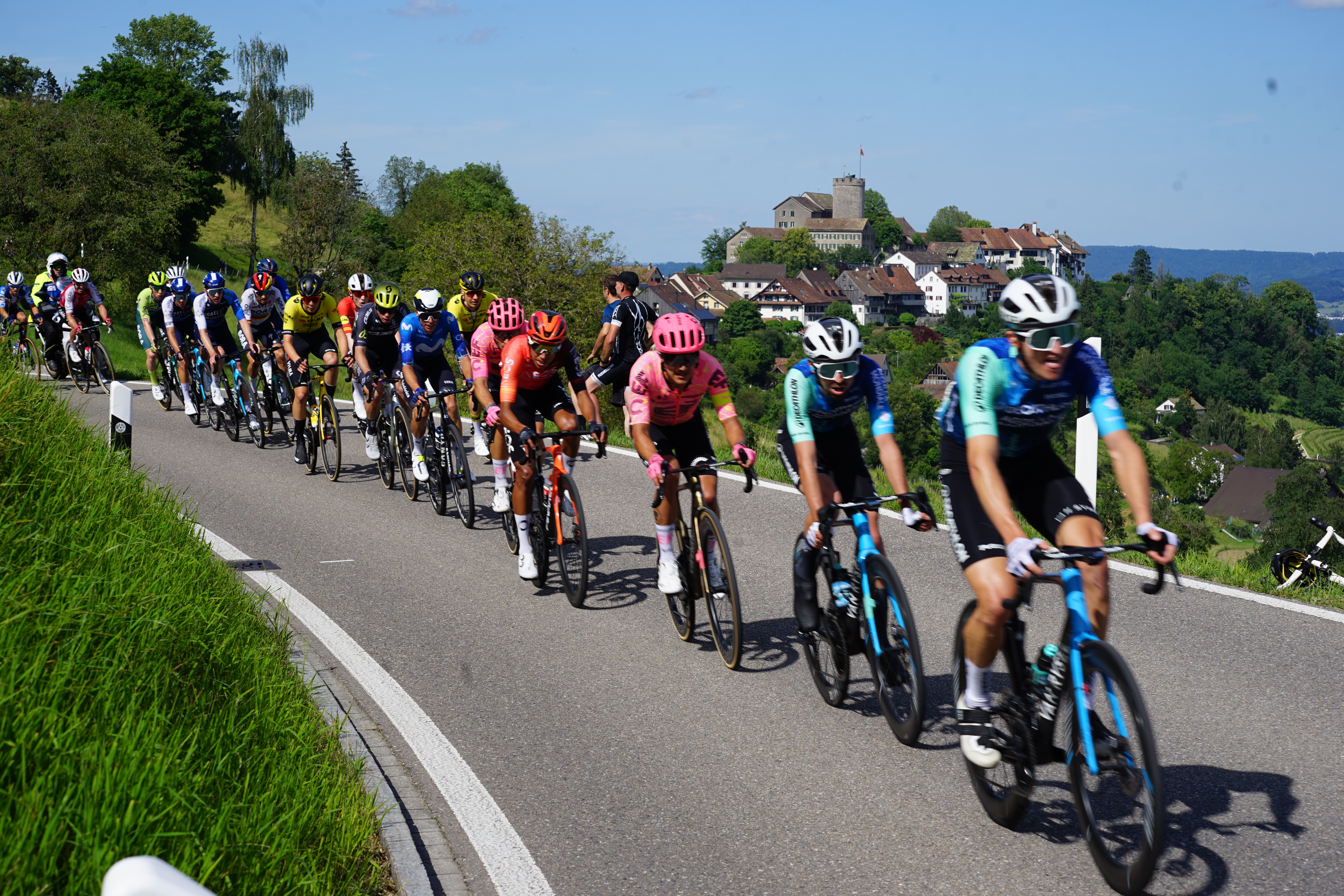
- The peloton during stage 2

Race details
- Dates: 9–16 June 2024
- Stages: 8
- Distance: 839.8 km (521.8 mi)
- Winning time: 20h 18' 49"

Results
Jersey awarded to the overall winner	Winner	Adam Yates (GBR)	(UAE Team Emirates)
	Second	João Almeida (POR)	(UAE Team Emirates)
	Third	Mattias Skjelmose (DEN)	(Lidl–Trek)
Jersey awarded to the points classification winner	Points	Adam Yates (GBR)	(UAE Team Emirates)
Jersey awarded to the mountains classification winner	Mountains	Adam Yates (GBR)	(UAE Team Emirates)
Jersey awarded to the youth classification winner	Youth	Mattias Skjelmose (DEN)	(Lidl–Trek)
	Team	(United Arab Emirates) UAE Team Emirates	

The 2024 Tour de Suisse was a road cycling stage race that took place between 9 and 16 June in Switzerland. It was the 87th edition of the Tour de Suisse and the 24th event of the 2024 UCI World Tour.

== Teams ==
All eighteen UCI WorldTeams were joined by five UCI ProTeams and the Swiss national team to make up the 24 teams that participated in the race.

UCI WorldTeams

- Alpecin–Deceuninck
- Arkéa–B&B Hotels
- Astana Qazaqstan Team
- Bora–Hansgrohe
- Cofidis
- Decathlon–AG2R La Mondiale
- EF Education–EasyPost
- Groupama–FDJ
- Ineos Grenadiers
- Intermarché–Wanty
- Lidl–Trek
- Movistar Team
- Soudal–Quick-Step
- Team Bahrain Victorious
- Team dsm–firmenich PostNL
- Team Jayco–AlUla
- UAE Team Emirates
- Visma–Lease a Bike

UCI ProTeams

- Israel–Premier Tech
- Lotto–Dstny
- Q36.5 Pro Cycling Team
- Team Corratec–Vini Fantini
- Tudor Pro Cycling Team

National Teams

- Switzerland

== Route ==
Stage characteristics and winners
Stage	Date	Route	Distance	Type	Winner
1	9 June	Vaduz (Liechtenstein)	4.8 km (3.0 mi)	Individual time trial	Yves Lampaert (BEL)
2	10 June	Vaduz (Liechtenstein) to Regensdorf	177.3 km (110.2 mi)	Hilly stage	Bryan Coquard (FRA)
3	11 June	Steinmaur to Rüschlikon	161.7 km (100.5 mi)	Hilly stage	Thibau Nys (BEL)
4	12 June	Rüschlikon to Gotthard Pass	171 km (106 mi)	Mountain stage	Torstein Træen (NOR)
5	13 June	Ambrì to Carì	148.6 km (92.3 mi)	Mountain stage	Adam Yates (GBR)
6	14 June	~~Locarno~~ Ulrichen to Blatten (Note: Distance originally was 151.4 km. Before the start of the stage, the distance was shortened to 42.5 km due to bad weather conditions.)	42.5 km (26.4 mi)	Mountain stage	João Almeida (POR)
7	15 June	Villars-sur-Ollon to Villars-sur-Ollon	118.2 km (73.4 mi)	Mountain stage	Adam Yates (GBR)
8	16 June	Aigle to Villars-sur-Ollon	15.7 km (9.8 mi)	Individual time trial	João Almeida (POR)
Total			839.8 km (521.8 mi) (Note: Distance originally was 948.7 km. Before the start of stage 6, the distance was shortened by 108.9 km due to bad weather conditions.)		

== Stages ==
=== Stage 1 ===
9 June 2024 — Vaduz (Liechtenstein), 4.8 km (3.0 mi) (ITT)

Stage 1 Result
Rank	Rider	Team	Time
1	Yves Lampaert (BEL)	Soudal–Quick-Step	5' 05"
2	Stefan Bissegger (SUI)	EF Education–EasyPost	+ 3"
3	Ethan Hayter (GBR)	Ineos Grenadiers	+ 4"
4	João Almeida (POR)	UAE Team Emirates	+ 7"
5	Finn Fisher-Black (NZL)	UAE Team Emirates	+ 7"
6	Samuel Watson (GBR)	Groupama–FDJ	+ 9"
7	Alberto Bettiol (ITA)	EF Education–EasyPost	+ 9"
8	Stefan Küng (SUI)	Groupama–FDJ	+ 11"
9	Mauro Schmid (SUI)	Team Jayco–AlUla	+ 11"
10	Søren Kragh Andersen (DEN)	Alpecin–Deceuninck	+ 11"

General classification after Stage 1
Rank	Rider	Team	Time
1	Yves Lampaert (BEL)	Soudal–Quick-Step	5' 05"
2	Stefan Bissegger (SUI)	EF Education–EasyPost	+ 3"
3	Ethan Hayter (GBR)	Ineos Grenadiers	+ 4"
4	João Almeida (POR)	UAE Team Emirates	+ 7"
5	Finn Fisher-Black (NZL)	UAE Team Emirates	+ 7"
6	Samuel Watson (GBR)	Groupama–FDJ	+ 9"
7	Alberto Bettiol (ITA)	EF Education–EasyPost	+ 9"
8	Stefan Küng (SUI)	Groupama–FDJ	+ 11"
9	Mauro Schmid (SUI)	Team Jayco–AlUla	+ 11"
10	Søren Kragh Andersen (DEN)	Alpecin–Deceuninck	+ 11"

=== Stage 2 ===
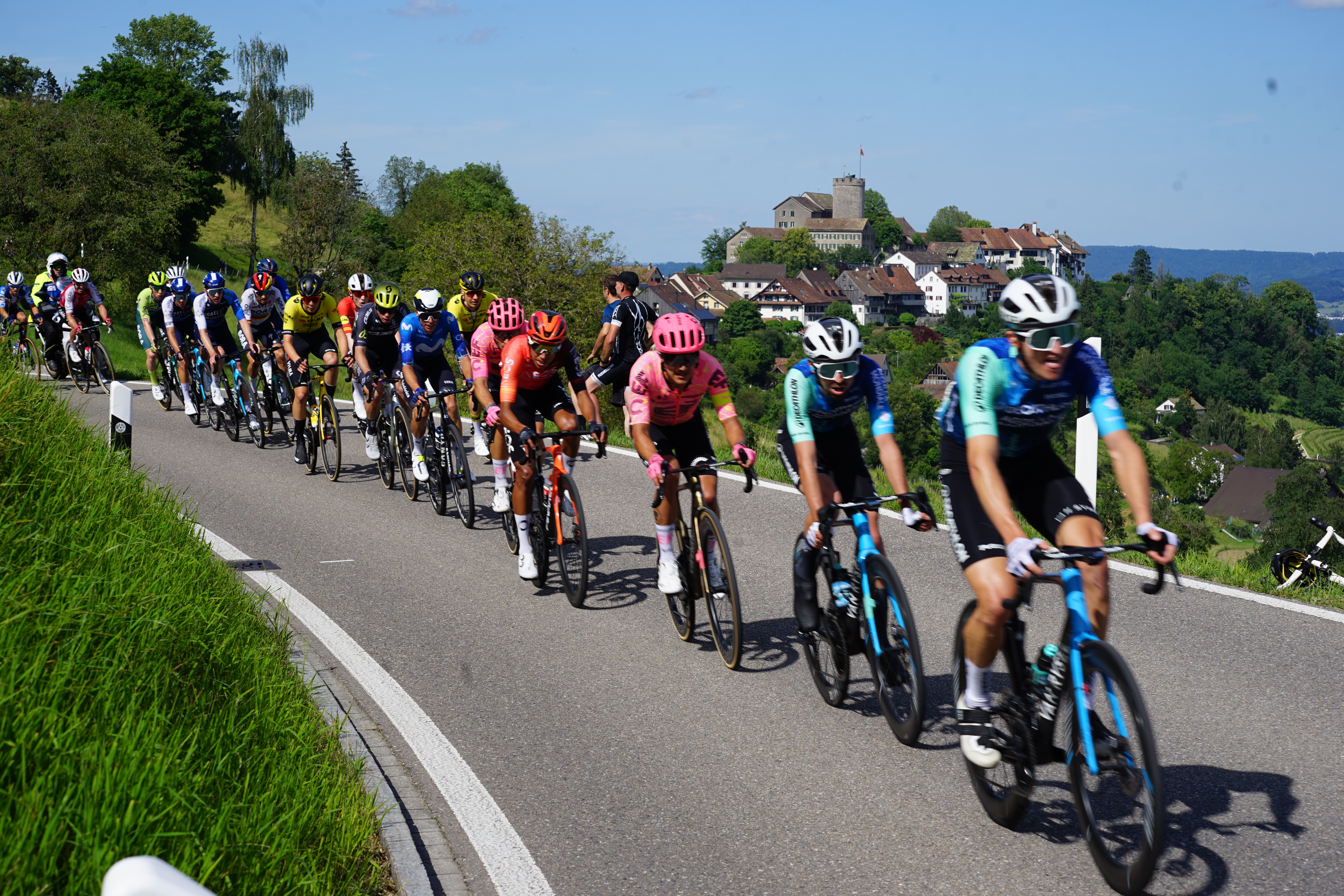
The peloton at Regensberg (mountain prize)

10 June 2024 — Vaduz (Liechtenstein) to Regensdorf, 177.3 km (110.2 mi)

Stage 2 Result
Rank	Rider	Team	Time
1	Bryan Coquard (FRA)	Cofidis	4h 06' 39"
2	Michael Matthews (AUS)	Team Jayco–AlUla	+ 0"
3	Arnaud de Lie (BEL)	Lotto–Dstny	+ 0"
4	Brandon Rivera (COL)	Ineos Grenadiers	+ 0"
5	Rui Costa (POR)	EF Education–EasyPost	+ 0"
6	Axel Laurance (FRA)	Alpecin–Deceuninck	+ 0"
7	Tom Pidcock (GBR)	Ineos Grenadiers	+ 0"
8	Roger Adrià (ESP)	Bora–Hansgrohe	+ 0"
9	Francesco Busatto (ITA)	Intermarché–Wanty	+ 0"
10	Stephen Williams (GBR)	Israel–Premier Tech	+ 0"

General classification after Stage 2
Rank	Rider	Team	Time
1	Yves Lampaert (BEL)	Soudal–Quick-Step	4h 11' 44"
2	Ethan Hayter (GBR)	Ineos Grenadiers	+ 4"
3	João Almeida (POR)	UAE Team Emirates	+ 7"
4	Finn Fisher-Black (NZL)	UAE Team Emirates	+ 7"
5	Michael Matthews (AUS)	Team Jayco–AlUla	+ 7"
6	Samuel Watson (GBR)	Groupama–FDJ	+ 9"
7	Alberto Bettiol (ITA)	EF Education–EasyPost	+ 9"
8	Stefan Küng (SUI)	Groupama–FDJ	+ 11"
9	Mauro Schmid (SUI)	Team Jayco–AlUla	+ 11"
10	Søren Kragh Andersen (DEN)	Alpecin–Deceuninck	+ 11"

=== Stage 3 ===
11 June 2024 — Steinmaur to Rüschlikon, 161.7 km (100.5 mi)

Stage 3 Result
Rank	Rider	Team	Time
1	Thibau Nys (BEL)	Lidl–Trek	3h 27' 31"
2	Stephen Williams (GBR)	Israel–Premier Tech	+ 0"
3	Alberto Bettiol (ITA)	EF Education–EasyPost	+ 0"
4	Roger Adrià (ESP)	Bora–Hansgrohe	+ 0"
5	Paul Lapeira (FRA)	Decathlon–AG2R La Mondiale	+ 0"
6	Wilco Kelderman (NED)	Visma–Lease a Bike	+ 0"
7	Adam Yates (GBR)	UAE Team Emirates	+ 0"
8	Mattias Skjelmose (DEN)	Lidl–Trek	+ 3"
9	Ben Tulett (GBR)	Visma–Lease a Bike	+ 3"
10	Richard Carapaz (ECU)	EF Education–EasyPost	+ 3"

General classification after Stage 3
Rank	Rider	Team	Time
1	Alberto Bettiol (ITA)	EF Education–EasyPost	7h 39' 20"
2	Ethan Hayter (GBR)	Ineos Grenadiers	+ 2"
3	João Almeida (POR)	UAE Team Emirates	+ 5"
4	Finn Fisher-Black (NZL)	UAE Team Emirates	+ 5"
5	Wilco Kelderman (NED)	Visma–Lease a Bike	+ 6"
6	Stephen Williams (GBR)	Israel–Premier Tech	+ 6"
7	Mattias Skjelmose (DEN)	Lidl–Trek	+ 9"
8	Adam Yates (GBR)	UAE Team Emirates	+ 10"
9	Jan Christen (SUI)	UAE Team Emirates	+ 11"
10	Roger Adrià (ESP)	Bora–Hansgrohe	+ 13"

=== Stage 4 ===
12 June 2024 — Rüschlikon to Gotthard Pass, 171 km (106 mi)

Stage 4 Result
Rank	Rider	Team	Time
1	Torstein Træen (NOR)	Team Bahrain Victorious	4h 10' 21"
2	Adam Yates (GBR)	UAE Team Emirates	+ 23"
3	Mattias Skjelmose (DEN)	Lidl–Trek	+ 48"
4	João Almeida (POR)	UAE Team Emirates	+ 48"
5	Egan Bernal (COL)	Ineos Grenadiers	+ 1' 00"
6	Oscar Onley (GBR)	Team dsm–firmenich PostNL	+ 1' 27"
7	Enric Mas (ESP)	Movistar Team	+ 1' 27"
8	Felix Gall (AUT)	Decathlon–AG2R La Mondiale	+ 1' 27"
9	Cian Uijtdebroeks (BEL)	Visma–Lease a Bike	+ 1' 27"
10	Matthew Riccitello (USA)	Israel–Premier Tech	+ 1' 27"

General classification after Stage 4
Rank	Rider	Team	Time
1	Adam Yates (GBR)	UAE Team Emirates	11h 50' 08"
2	João Almeida (POR)	UAE Team Emirates	+ 26"
3	Mattias Skjelmose (DEN)	Lidl–Trek	+ 26"
4	Egan Bernal (COL)	Ineos Grenadiers	+ 49"
5	Wilco Kelderman (NED)	Visma–Lease a Bike	+ 1' 15"
6	Oscar Onley (GBR)	Team dsm–firmenich PostNL	+ 1' 17"
7	Enric Mas (ESP)	Movistar Team	+ 1' 17"
8	Cian Uijtdebroeks (BEL)	Visma–Lease a Bike	+ 1' 21"
9	Matthew Riccitello (USA)	Israel–Premier Tech	+ 1' 25"
10	Felix Gall (AUT)	Decathlon–AG2R La Mondiale	+ 1' 42"

=== Stage 5 ===
13 June 2024 — Ambrì to Carì, 148.6 km (92.3 mi)

Stage 4 Result
Rank	Rider	Team	Time
1	Adam Yates (GBR)	UAE Team Emirates	3h 54' 37"
2	João Almeida (POR)	UAE Team Emirates	+ 5"
3	Egan Bernal (COL)	Ineos Grenadiers	+ 16"
4	Matthew Riccitello (USA)	Israel–Premier Tech	+ 18"
5	Enric Mas (ESP)	Movistar Team	+ 22"
6	Oscar Onley (GBR)	Team dsm–firmenich PostNL	+ 54"
7	Tom Pidcock (GBR)	Ineos Grenadiers	+ 54"
8	Sergio Higuita (COL)	Bora–Hansgrohe	+ 1' 03"
8	Felix Gall (AUT)	Decathlon–AG2R La Mondiale	+ 1' 13"
10	Cian Uijtdebroeks (BEL)	Visma–Lease a Bike	+ 1' 20"

General classification after Stage 5
Rank	Rider	Team	Time
1	Adam Yates (GBR)	UAE Team Emirates	15h 44' 35"
2	João Almeida (POR)	UAE Team Emirates	+ 35"
3	Egan Bernal (COL)	Ineos Grenadiers	+ 1' 11"
4	Enric Mas (ESP)	Movistar Team	+ 1' 49"
5	Matthew Riccitello (USA)	Israel–Premier Tech	+ 1' 53"
6	Mattias Skjelmose (DEN)	Lidl–Trek	+ 2' 17"
7	Oscar Onley (GBR)	Team dsm–firmenich PostNL	+ 2' 21"
8	Tom Pidcock (GBR)	Ineos Grenadiers	+ 2' 46"
9	Cian Uijtdebroeks (BEL)	Visma–Lease a Bike	+ 2' 51"
10	Sergio Higuita (COL)	Bora–Hansgrohe	+ 3' 01"

=== Stage 6 ===
14 June 2024 — ~~Locarno~~ Ulrichen to Blatten, 42.5 km (26.4 mi)

Stage 6 Result
Rank	Rider	Team	Time
1	João Almeida (POR)	UAE Team Emirates	55' 13"
2	Adam Yates (GBR)	UAE Team Emirates	+ 4"
3	Mattias Skjelmose (DEN)	Lidl–Trek	+ 9"
4	Egan Bernal (COL)	Ineos Grenadiers	+ 15"
5	Lenny Martinez (FRA)	Groupama–FDJ	+ 35"
6	Tom Pidcock (GBR)	Ineos Grenadiers	+ 40"
7	Enric Mas (ESP)	Movistar Team	+ 47"
8	Matthew Riccitello (USA)	Israel–Premier Tech	+ 47"
9	Pelayo Sánchez (ESP)	Movistar Team	+ 54"
10	Felix Gall (AUT)	Decathlon–AG2R La Mondiale	+ 54"

General classification after Stage 6
Rank	Rider	Team	Time
1	Adam Yates (GBR)	UAE Team Emirates	16h 39' 46"
2	João Almeida (POR)	UAE Team Emirates	+ 27"
3	Egan Bernal (COL)	Ineos Grenadiers	+ 1' 28"
4	Mattias Skjelmose (DEN)	Lidl–Trek	+ 2' 24"
5	Enric Mas (ESP)	Movistar Team	+ 2' 38"
6	Matthew Riccitello (USA)	Israel–Premier Tech	+ 2' 42"
7	Tom Pidcock (GBR)	Ineos Grenadiers	+ 3' 28"
8	Oscar Onley (GBR)	Team dsm–firmenich PostNL	+ 3' 37"
9	Felix Gall (AUT)	Decathlon–AG2R La Mondiale	+ 4' 01"
10	Pelayo Sánchez (ESP)	Movistar Team	+ 4' 28"

=== Stage 7 ===
15 June 2024 — Villars-sur-Ollon to Villars-sur-Ollon, 118.2 km (73.4 mi)

Stage 7 Result
Rank	Rider	Team	Time
1	Adam Yates (GBR)	UAE Team Emirates	3h 05' 41"
2	João Almeida (POR)	UAE Team Emirates	+ 0"
3	Matthew Riccitello (USA)	Israel–Premier Tech	+ 14"
4	Wilco Kelderman (NED)	Visma–Lease a Bike	+ 16"
5	Mattias Skjelmose (DEN)	Lidl–Trek	+ 16"
6	Egan Bernal (COL)	Ineos Grenadiers	+ 16"
7	Oscar Onley (GBR)	Team dsm–firmenich PostNL	+ 16"
8	Tom Pidcock (GBR)	Ineos Grenadiers	+ 16"
9	Felix Gall (AUT)	Decathlon–AG2R La Mondiale	+ 32"
10	Enric Mas (ESP)	Movistar Team	+ 35"

General classification after Stage 7
Rank	Rider	Team	Time
1	Adam Yates (GBR)	UAE Team Emirates	19h 45' 17"
2	João Almeida (POR)	UAE Team Emirates	+ 31"
3	Egan Bernal (COL)	Ineos Grenadiers	+ 1' 51"
4	Mattias Skjelmose (DEN)	Lidl–Trek	+ 2' 50"
5	Matthew Riccitello (USA)	Israel–Premier Tech	+ 3' 02"
6	Enric Mas (ESP)	Movistar Team	+ 3' 23"
7	Tom Pidcock (GBR)	Ineos Grenadiers	+ 3' 54"
8	Oscar Onley (GBR)	Team dsm–firmenich PostNL	+ 4' 03"
9	Felix Gall (AUT)	Decathlon–AG2R La Mondiale	+ 4' 41"
10	Wilco Kelderman (NED)	Visma–Lease a Bike	+ 4' 59"

=== Stage 8 ===
16 June 2024 — Aigle to Villars-sur-Ollon, 15.7 km (9.8 mi) (ITT)

Stage 8 Result
Rank	Rider	Team	Time
1	João Almeida (POR)	UAE Team Emirates	33' 23"
2	Adam Yates (GBR)	UAE Team Emirates	+ 8"
3	Mattias Skjelmose (DEN)	Lidl–Trek	+ 20"
4	Matthew Riccitello (USA)	Israel–Premier Tech	+ 37"
5	Tom Pidcock (GBR)	Ineos Grenadiers	+ 50"
6	Lenny Martinez (FRA)	Groupama–FDJ	+ 55"
7	Pelayo Sánchez (ESP)	Movistar Team	+ 1' 21"
8	David de la Cruz (ESP)	Q36.5 Pro Cycling Team	+ 1' 25"
9	Egan Bernal (COL)	Ineos Grenadiers	+ 1' 30"
10	Wilco Kelderman (NED)	Visma–Lease a Bike	+ 1' 40"

General classification after Stage 8
Rank	Rider	Team	Time
1	Adam Yates (GBR)	UAE Team Emirates	20h 18' 49"
2	João Almeida (POR)	UAE Team Emirates	+ 22"
3	Mattias Skjelmose (DEN)	Lidl–Trek	+ 3' 02"
4	Egan Bernal (COL)	Ineos Grenadiers	+ 3' 12"
5	Matthew Riccitello (USA)	Israel–Premier Tech	+ 3' 31"
6	Tom Pidcock (GBR)	Ineos Grenadiers	+ 4' 36"
7	Enric Mas (ESP)	Movistar Team	+ 5' 01"
8	Oscar Onley (GBR)	Team dsm–firmenich PostNL	+ 5' 40"
9	Wilco Kelderman (NED)	Visma–Lease a Bike	+ 6' 31"
10	Felix Gall (AUT)	Decathlon–AG2R La Mondiale	+ 6' 35"

== Classification leadership table ==
Classification leadership by stage
Stage	Winner	General classification	Points classification	Mountains classification	Young rider classification	Team classification
1	Yves Lampaert	Yves Lampaert	Yves Lampaert	not awarded	Finn Fisher-Black	UAE Team Emirates
2	Bryan Coquard	Yves Lampaert	Yves Lampaert	Gerben Kuypers	Finn Fisher-Black	UAE Team Emirates
3	Thibau Nys	Alberto Bettiol	Yves Lampaert	Luca Jenni	Finn Fisher-Black	UAE Team Emirates
4	Torstein Træen	Adam Yates	Bryan Coquard	Torstein Træen	Mattias Skjelmose	UAE Team Emirates
5	Adam Yates	Adam Yates	Adam Yates	Adam Yates	Matthew Riccitello	UAE Team Emirates
6	João Almeida	Adam Yates	Adam Yates	Adam Yates	Mattias Skjelmose	UAE Team Emirates
7	Adam Yates	Adam Yates	Adam Yates	Adam Yates	Mattias Skjelmose	UAE Team Emirates
8	João Almeida	Adam Yates	Adam Yates	Adam Yates	Mattias Skjelmose	UAE Team Emirates
Final		Adam Yates	Adam Yates	Adam Yates	Mattias Skjelmose	UAE Team Emirates

== Classification standings ==
Legend
Denotes the winner of the general classification	Denotes the winner of the young rider classification
Denotes the winner of the points classification	Denotes the winner of the mountains classification

=== General classification ===
Final general classification (1–10)
Rank	Rider	Team	Time
1	Adam Yates (GBR)	UAE Team Emirates	20h 18' 49"
2	João Almeida (POR)	UAE Team Emirates	+ 22"
3	Mattias Skjelmose (DEN)	Lidl–Trek	+ 3' 02"
4	Egan Bernal (COL)	Ineos Grenadiers	+ 3' 12"
5	Matthew Riccitello (USA)	Israel–Premier Tech	+ 3' 31"
6	Tom Pidcock (GBR)	Ineos Grenadiers	+ 4' 36"
7	Enric Mas (ESP)	Movistar Team	+ 5' 01"
8	Oscar Onley (GBR)	Team dsm–firmenich PostNL	+ 5' 40"
9	Wilco Kelderman (NED)	Visma–Lease a Bike	+ 6' 31"
10	Felix Gall (AUT)	Decathlon–AG2R La Mondiale	+ 6' 35"

=== Points classification ===
Final points classification (1–10)
Rank	Rider	Team	Points
1	Adam Yates (GBR)	UAE Team Emirates	48
2	João Almeida (POR)	UAE Team Emirates	48
3	Johannes Staune-Mittet (NOR)	Visma–Lease a Bike	20
4	Mattias Skjelmose (DEN)	Lidl–Trek	20
5	Michael Matthews (AUS)	Team Jayco–AlUla	18
6	Stefan Bissegger (SUI)	EF Education–EasyPost	18
7	Matthew Riccitello (USA)	Israel–Premier Tech	14
8	Torstein Træen (NOR)	Team Bahrain Victorious	12
9	Thibau Nys (BEL)	Lidl–Trek	12
10	Yves Lampaert (BEL)	Soudal–Quick-Step	12

=== Mountains classification ===
Final mountains classification (1–10)
Rank	Rider	Team	Points
1	Adam Yates (GBR)	UAE Team Emirates	47
2	Egan Bernal (COL)	Ineos Grenadiers	27
3	João Almeida (POR)	UAE Team Emirates	23
4	Alexey Lutsenko (KAZ)	Astana Qazaqstan Team	19
5	Torstein Træen (NOR)	Team Bahrain Victorious	18
6	Maxim Van Gils (BEL)	Lotto–Dstny	16
7	Johannes Staune-Mittet (NOR)	Visma–Lease a Bike	10
8	Gerben Kuypers (BEL)	Intermarché–Wanty	10
9	Luca Jenni (SUI)	Switzerland	10
10	Mattias Skjelmose (DEN)	Lidl–Trek	10

=== Young rider classification ===
Final young rider classification (1–10)
Rank	Rider	Team	Time
1	Mattias Skjelmose (DEN)	Lidl–Trek	20h 21' 51"
2	Matthew Riccitello (USA)	Israel–Premier Tech	+ 29"
3	Tom Pidcock (GBR)	Ineos Grenadiers	+ 1' 34"
4	Oscar Onley (GBR)	Team dsm–firmenich PostNL	+ 2' 38"
5	Pelayo Sánchez (ESP)	Movistar Team	+ 3' 40"
6	Isaac del Toro (MEX)	UAE Team Emirates	+ 6' 08"
7	Harold Martín López (ECU)	Astana Qazaqstan Team	+ 9' 08"
8	Marco Brenner (GER)	Tudor Pro Cycling Team	+ 9' 24"
9	Finlay Pickering (GBR)	Team Bahrain Victorious	+ 9' 29"
10	William Junior Lecerf (BEL)	Soudal–Quick-Step	+ 10' 26"

=== Team classification ===
Final team classification (1–10)
Rank	Team	Time
1	(United Arab Emirates) UAE Team Emirates	61h 06' 02"
2	(United Kingdom) Ineos Grenadiers	+ 10' 41"
3	(Spain) Movistar Team	+ 21' 28"
4	(Netherlands) Visma–Lease a Bike	+ 24' 50"
5	Israel–Premier Tech	+ 37' 39"
6	(United States) Lidl–Trek	+ 43' 59"
7	(France) Decathlon–AG2R La Mondiale	+ 45' 30"
8	(Switzerland) Q36.5 Pro Cycling Team	+ 46' 24"
9	Team Bahrain Victorious	+ 48' 43"
10	(Netherlands) Team dsm–firmenich PostNL	+ 52' 44"
