= Sanem =

Sanem Suessem (Luxembourgish) Sassenheim (German)
- Commune
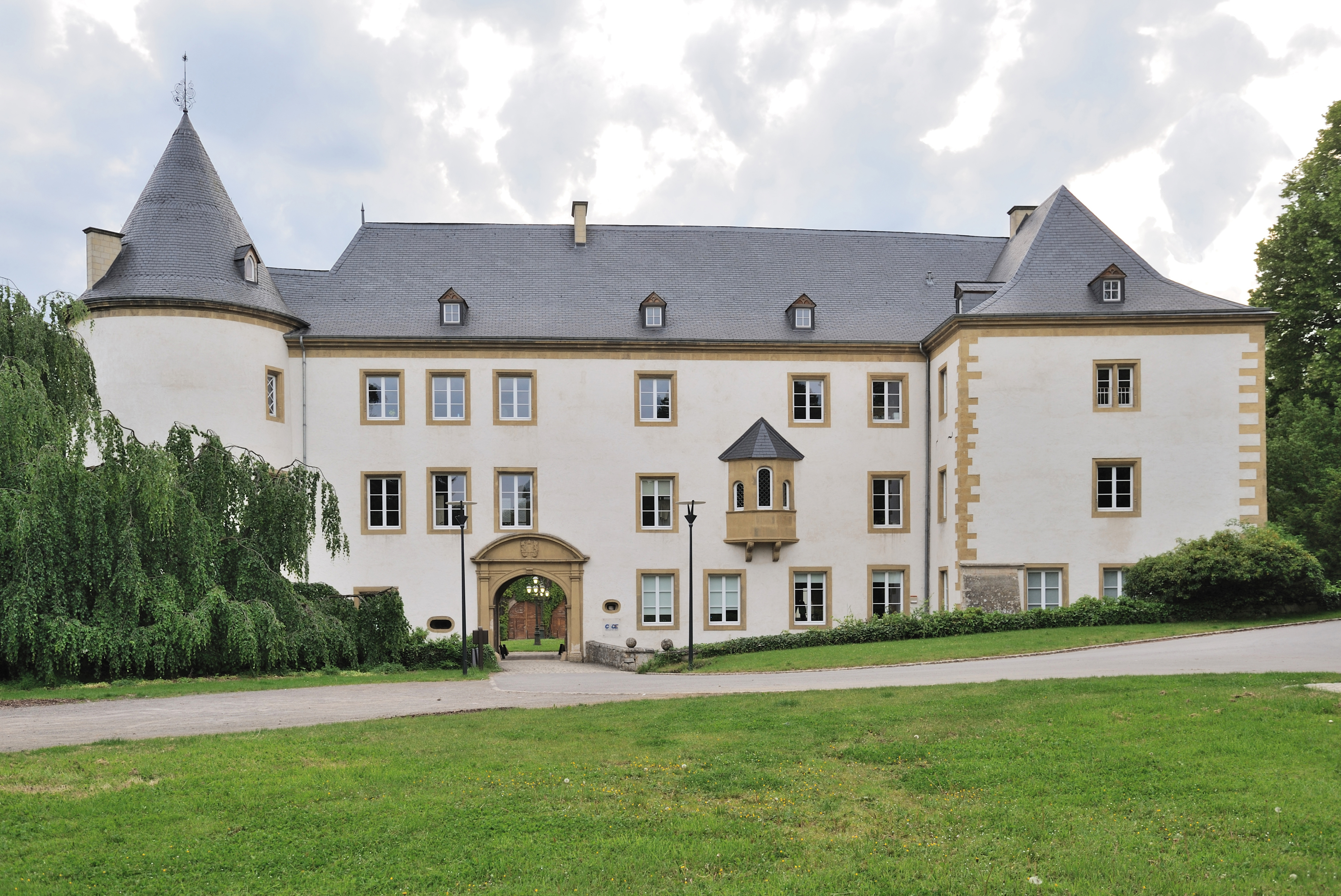
- The castle

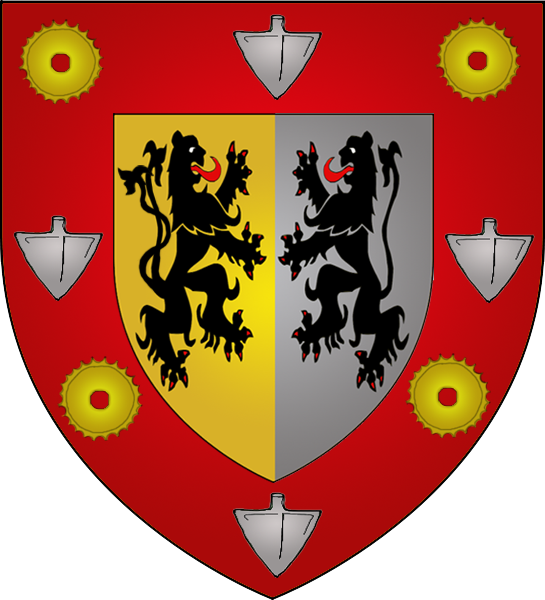
- Coat of arms

- Map of Luxembourg with Sanem highlighted in orange, and the canton in dark red
- Coordinates: 49.5472°N 5.9278°E
- Country: Luxembourg
- Canton: Esch-sur-Alzette

Government
  - Mayor: Simone Asselborn-Bintz (LSAP)

Area
  - Total: 24.42 km^{2} (9.43 sq mi)
  - Rank: 36th of 100
- Highest elevation: 422 m (1,385 ft)
  - Rank: 34th of 100
- Lowest elevation: 277 m (909 ft)
  - Rank: 79th of 100

Population (2026)
  - Total: 19,778
  - Rank: 6th of 100
  - Density: 809.9/km^{2} (2,098/sq mi)
  - Rank: 10th of 100
- Time zone: UTC+1 (CET)
  - Summer (DST): UTC+2 (CEST)
- LAU 2: LU0000213
- Website: sanem.lu

Sanem (Luxembourgish: Suessem [ˈzu̯əsəm]; German: Sassenheim [ˈzasn̩ˌhaɪm]) is a commune and town in south-western Luxembourg. It is part of the canton of Esch-sur-Alzette. The administrative centre and largest town is Belvaux.

As of September 2026, the town of Sanem, which lies in the north of the commune, has a population of 2,888. Other towns within the commune include Belvaux, Ehlerange, and Soleuvre.

== Notable people ==
- Albert Simon (1901–1956), a Luxembourgish painter.
- Niki Bettendorf (1936–2018), a Luxembourgish politician; Mayor of Bertrange, 1982 to 2001.
- Jean-Claude Juncker (born 1954), prime minister of Luxembourg (1995-2013) and president of the European Commission (2014-2019), grew up in Belvaux.

== Population ==
Historical population

| Year | Pop. | ±% |
|---|---|---|
| 1821 | 1,096 | — |
| 1851 | 1,275 | +16.3% |
| 1900 | 1,877 | +47.2% |
| 1910 | 2,339 | +24.6% |
| 1922 | 2,356 | +0.7% |
| 1935 | 4,700 | +99.5% |

| Year | Pop. | ±% |
|---|---|---|
| 1947 | 4,468 | −4.9% |
| 1960 | 7,021 | +57.1% |
| 1970 | 10,078 | +43.5% |
| 1981 | 11,162 | +10.8% |
| 1990 | 11,287 | +1.1% |
| 2000 | 12,859 | +13.9% |

| Year | Pop. | ±% |
|---|---|---|
| 2005 | 13,898 | +8.1% |
| 2010 | 14,421 | +3.8% |
| 2015 | 15,415 | +6.9% |
| 2020 | 17,550 | +13.9% |
| 2021 | 17,895 | +2.0% |

Source data

== Sanem Castle ==
Sanem Castle has a history dating back to the 13th century. Today's building was completed in 1557 after the medieval castle had been partly destroyed. The castle still maintains much of its original character.

== Twin towns — sister cities ==
Sanem is twinned with:

- Chauffailles, France

== See also ==
- List of mayors of Sanem
