= Tom Pidcock =

British cyclist (born 1999)

Tom Pidcock OBE
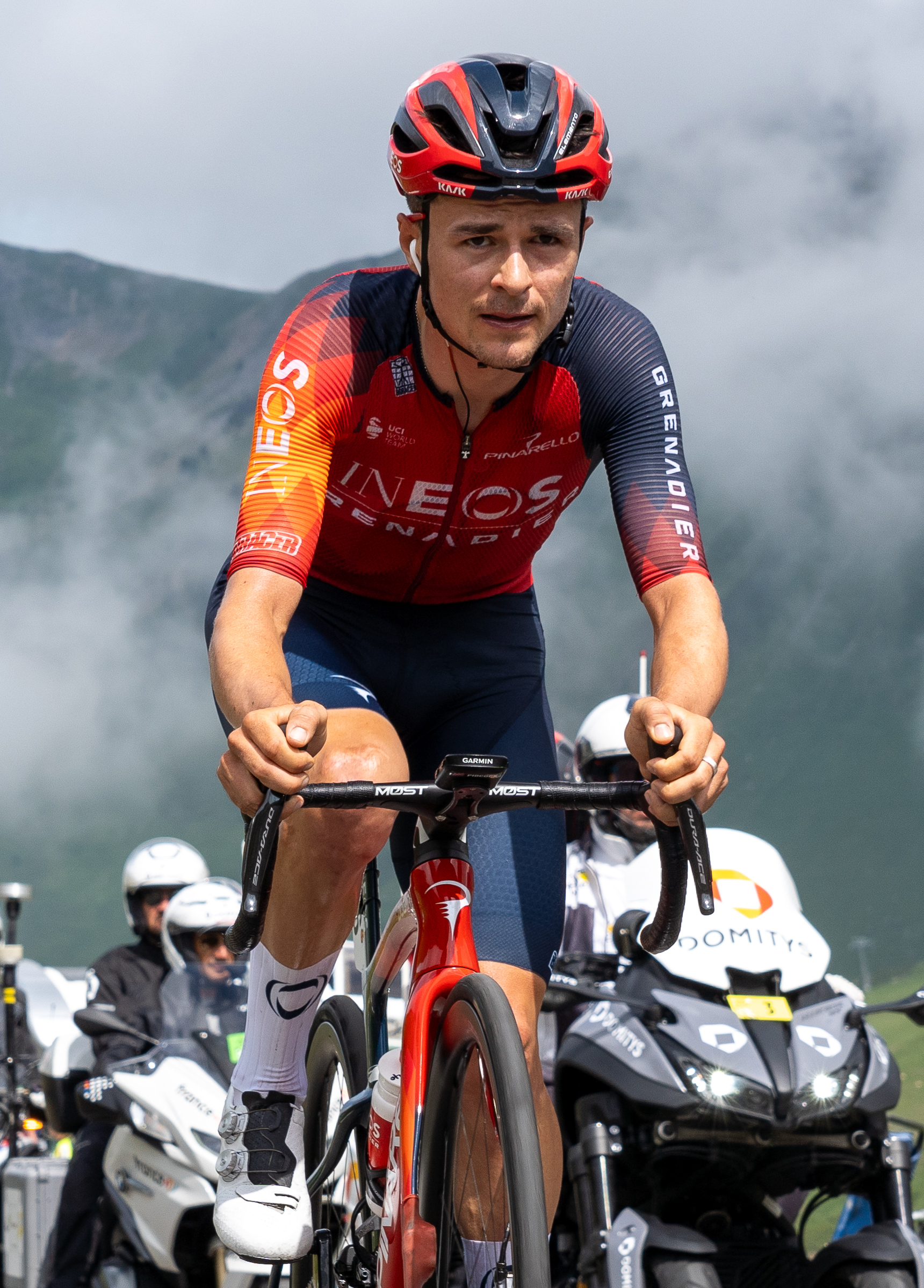
- Pidcock at the 2023 Tour de France

Personal information
- Full name: Thomas Pidcock
- Nickname: Pidders
- Born: 30 July 1999 (age 27) Leeds, England
- Height: 1.70 m (5 ft 7 in)
- Weight: 58 kg (128 lb)

Cycling career
- Sport: Cycling
- Current team: Pinarello–Q36.5 Pro Cycling Team
- Disciplines: Cyclo-cross; Mountain biking; Road
- Role: Rider
- Rider type: Cross-country (MTB); Classics specialist (Road); Puncheur (Road)

Amateur teams
- 2015–2017: Great Britain Junior Academy
- 2015–2017: PH-MAS Oldfield/Paul Milnes Cycles
- 2018–2021: TP Racing

Professional teams
- 2017–2018: Telenet–Fidea Lions (CX)
- 2018–2019: WIGGINS (Road)
- 2021–2024: INEOS Grenadiers
- 2025–: Q36.5 Pro Cycling Team

Major wins
- Cyclo-cross World Championships (2022) National Championships (2019, 2020) World Cup 3 individual wins (2021–22, 2023–24) Mountain bike Olympic Games XC (2020, 2024) World XC Championships (2023, 2026) European XC Championships (2022, 2025) XC World Cup 9 individual wins (2021–2026) Road Grand Tours Tour de France 1 individual stage (2022) One-day races and Classics Amstel Gold Race (2024) Strade Bianche (2023) Brabantse Pijl (2021) GP Industria & Artigianato (2026) Milano–Torino (2026)
Medal record
Representing Great Britain
Men's cyclo-cross
World Championships
Gold medal – first place	2022 Fayetteville	Elite
Gold medal – first place	2019 Bogense	Under-23
Gold medal – first place	2017 Bieles	Junior
Silver medal – second place	2020 Dübendorf	Elite
European Championships
Gold medal – first place	2018 Rosmalen	Under-23
Gold medal – first place	2016 Pontchâteau	Junior
Silver medal – second place	2017 Tábor	Under-23
Men's mountain bike
Olympic Games
Gold medal – first place	2020 Tokyo	Cross-country
Gold medal – first place	2024 Paris	Cross-country
World Championships
Gold medal – first place	2023 Glasgow	Cross-country
Gold medal – first place	2026 Val di Sole	Cross-country
Gold medal – first place	2020 Leogang	E-MTB Cross-country
Gold medal – first place	2020 Leogang	Under-23 Cross-country
Bronze medal – third place	2023 Glasgow	Short track
Bronze medal – third place	2024 Vallnord	Cross-country
European Championships
Gold medal – first place	2022 Munich	Cross-country
Gold medal – first place	2025 Melgaço	Cross-country
Men's road cycling
World Championships
Gold medal – first place	2017 Bergen	Junior time trial
Bronze medal – third place	2019 Yorkshire	Under-23 road race

Thomas Pidcock (born 30 July 1999) is a British cyclist who competes in the cyclo-cross, mountain bike and road bicycle racing disciplines of the sport for the Swiss Pinarello–Q36.5 Pro Cycling Team. Prior to his release in December 2024, he rode for UCI WorldTeam Netcompany–Ineos.

After his junior and under-23 career with World Championship victories in all three of these disciplines, Pidcock turned professional in 2021. Since then his biggest victories have been the cross-country mountain bike title at the 2020 Summer Olympics, and retaining the Olympic title in 2024, becoming only the second man to win back to back Olympic titles, the 2023 World Championships cross-country and again in 2026, and the 2022 and 2025 European Championships cross-country titles; in the cyclo-cross discipline, winning the 2022 Cyclo-cross World Championships, to back up world titles at Junior and Under-23 level, while on the road he has won the spring road classics, Strade Bianche in 2023 and the Amstel Gold Race in 2024. His best Monument finishes have been 2nd in Liège–Bastogne–Liège in 2023 and Milan–San Remo in 2026, while his best grand tour result was his third place finish overall at the 2025 Vuelta a España.

Across all three disciplines, he has won numerous other races, with his biggest victory on the road in his first season being the 2021 Brabantse Pijl road classic. While his early successes on the road have been in classics, in his second season, riding his first Tour de France in 2022, he took his first Grand Tour stage, winning solo on the climb of Alpe d'Huez, the youngest rider ever to do so. He is also known for his aggressive descending skills. In 2025, he achieved his first overall GC podium in a grand tour, with a third place finish at the 2025 Vuelta a España, before achieving a top ten finish in the general classification of the 2026 Tour de France.

== Career ==
=== Junior career ===
After several high-ranking results during the 2015–2016 cyclo-cross season, including a top-five result in the junior race at the 2016 UCI Cyclo-cross World Championships at Circuit Zolder, Pidcock came to prominence in the junior ranks during 2016. In September, Pidcock took a road victory, winning the La Philippe Gilbert Juniors race by 21 seconds from his closest competitor. Thereafter, Pidcock concentrated on the 2016–2017 cyclo-cross season; in October, Pidcock took a victory in the Superprestige at Zonhoven, just before the UEC European Cyclo-cross Championships at Pontchâteau, France. In the race, Pidcock was able to work his way into the lead on the third of eight laps, and was able to create a gap to the rest of the field, eventually taking the gold medal by 14 seconds clear of France's Nicolas Guillemin.

Thereafter in November, Pidcock was able to claim victories at the Grand Prix van Hasselt, and the Bollekescross DVV Trophy event, as well as a first podium finish in the UCI Junior Cyclo-cross World Cup, with a third in Zeven, Germany. Pidcock took his first win in the competition the following month in Namur, taking the victory around the city's citadel by almost a minute ahead of France's Antoine Benoist; he echoed previous celebrations of Peter Sagan and Mathieu van der Poel by wheelieing across the finish line. The performances had caught the eye of Telenet–Fidea Lions team manager and former world champion Sven Nys, who was looking to sign Pidcock to his team. In the run up to the 2017 UCI Cyclo-cross World Championships, Pidcock won his first British National Junior Cyclo-cross Championships title in Bradford, and won a second World Cup race in the Grand Prix Adrie van der Poel at Hoogerheide, leading teammate Ben Turner home in a 1–2 finish.

With his form, Pidcock entered the World Championships as one of the junior race favourites. On an icy course in Bieles, Luxembourg, Pidcock took the lead from France's Maxime Bonsergent on the second lap of the five-lap race, and held onto the lead for the remainder of the race to take the rainbow jersey, the first British junior to do so since Roger Hammond in 1992. Pidcock's teammates Dan Tulett and Ben Turner completed the top-three placings, for a British clean sweep of the podium. Such was his performance, that Belgian media referred to him as a "mini-Sagan", in reference to Peter Sagan.

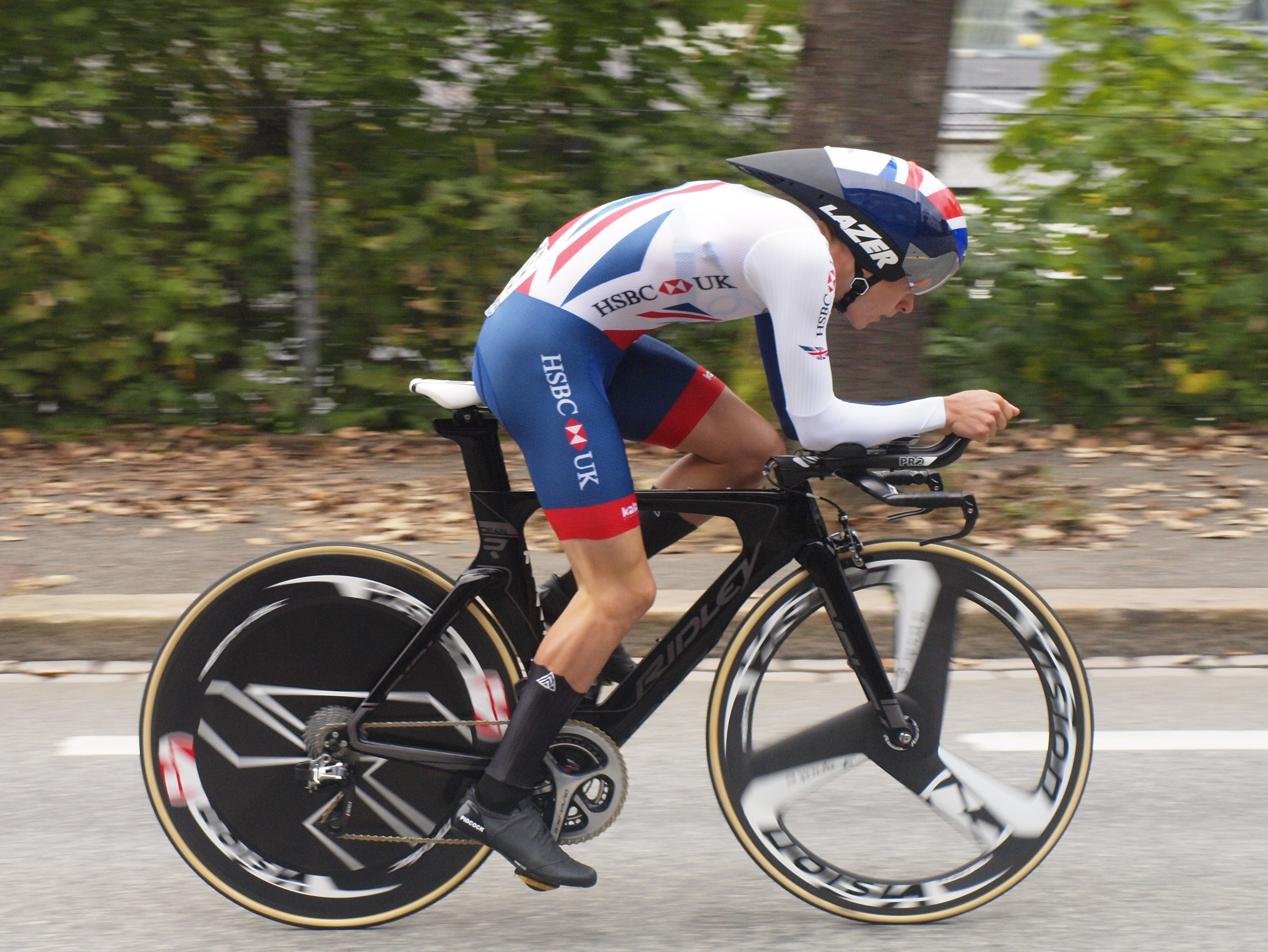
Pidcock won the junior time trial at the 2017 UCI Road World Championships.

In April 2017, two and a half months after his win at the Junior World Cyclo-cross Championships, Pidcock won Paris–Roubaix Juniors, breaking clear with a solo attack on the Carrefour de l'Arbre 15 km (9.3 mi) from the finish. In May 2017, while riding for the PH Mas–Paul Milnes–Oldfield team, Pidcock became the first guesting rider to win an individual round of the Tour Series criterium competition, soloing to victory in Durham. In July he went on to win the elite race of the British National Circuit Race Championships in Sheffield, at only 17 years of age, attacking on the final climb on the final lap and taking the title ahead of Harry Tanfield and Jon Mould. In addition to his success in cyclo-cross, criteriums and road racing, in August he took honours on the track when he won the junior British National Scratch Championships. On 19 September 2017, he won the junior time trial at the UCI Road World Championships in Norway.

=== Telenet–Fidea Lions ===
At the start of June 2017, Pidcock announced that he would join the Telenet–Fidea Lions team from October, on a two-year contract. Pidcock made his début with the team at the Polderscross Brico Cross race on 14 October 2017, where he finished as part of a five-rider group – including the likes of Laurens Sweeck and Kevin Pauwels – in ninth place, 77 seconds down on race winner Mathieu van der Poel. The following weekend, he took his first win for the team; on 21 October, he took victory in the under-23 race at the Niels Albert CX, held in Boom, as part of the Superprestige competition. Pidcock finished eight seconds clear of his closest competitor, Adam Ťoupalík. On 22 October, Pidcock again got the better of Ťoupalík in the first under-23 World Cup race of the season, at Koksijde. In November, Pidcock took the silver medal in the under-23 race at the European Championships, in Tábor, Czech Republic; Belgium's Eli Iserbyt out-sprinted him to the finish line in a two-up sprint but Pidcock raised his arm in protest, claiming that Iserbyt had made an irregular sprint, boxing him in at the barriers. In December, it was announced that Pidcock would ride for WIGGINS in road races in 2018. On 26 December 2017, Pidcock won his fourth World Cup race in as many starts, at the Grand Prix Eric De Vlaeminck held at Circuit Zolder. With the victory, it gave him an unassailable lead in the World Cup standings, as a rider's best four scores (from seven races) count towards the classification.

In the run up to the 2018 UCI Cyclo-cross World Championships, Pidcock won his first British National Under-23 Cyclo-cross Championships title in Hetton-le-Hole, winning the race by over a minute from his next closest competitor. However, despite being considered the favourite for the Under-23 title at the Worlds, he could only finish 15th after enduring a poor start to the race when he lost his footing on the pedals.

=== TP Racing, WIGGINS and Trinity ===
In August 2018, it was announced that Pidcock and Telenet–Fidea Lions had mutually agreed to end their contract to allow Pidcock to join new British cyclo-cross team TP Racing. The team was established by rider agency Trinity Sports Management, and a spokesperson for Trinity indicated that the new team would be built around Pidcock. The team made their debut in October 2018. During the 2018–19 season, Pidcock won a second Under-23 Cyclo-cross World Cup, the Under-23 Superprestige, the Under-23 European Championship, and the Under-23 World Championship, as well as the senior British National Championship.

After the cyclo-cross season, Pidcock added to his success at Paris–Roubaix Juniors two years previously by winning Paris–Roubaix Espoirs in June 2019 in the colours of Wiggins Le Col. Pidcock and Johan Jacobs attacked off the front of a nine-man leading group with 25 km (16 mi) to go: Pidcock attacked again and left Jacobs behind with less than 20 km (12 mi) to go and rode solo to the finish to take the win, making him the first British rider to win the Under-23 version of the race. He made a successful transition to another discipline the following month, when he won the Under-23 British National Mountain Biking Championship in Cannock Chase with a sprint from a three-man group at the finish of the race. At the 2019 UCI Road World Championships, held on home roads in Yorkshire, Pidcock crossed the finish line of the Under-23 road race in fourth, although this was subsequently promoted to third as the initial apparent winner Nils Eekhoff was subsequently disqualified.

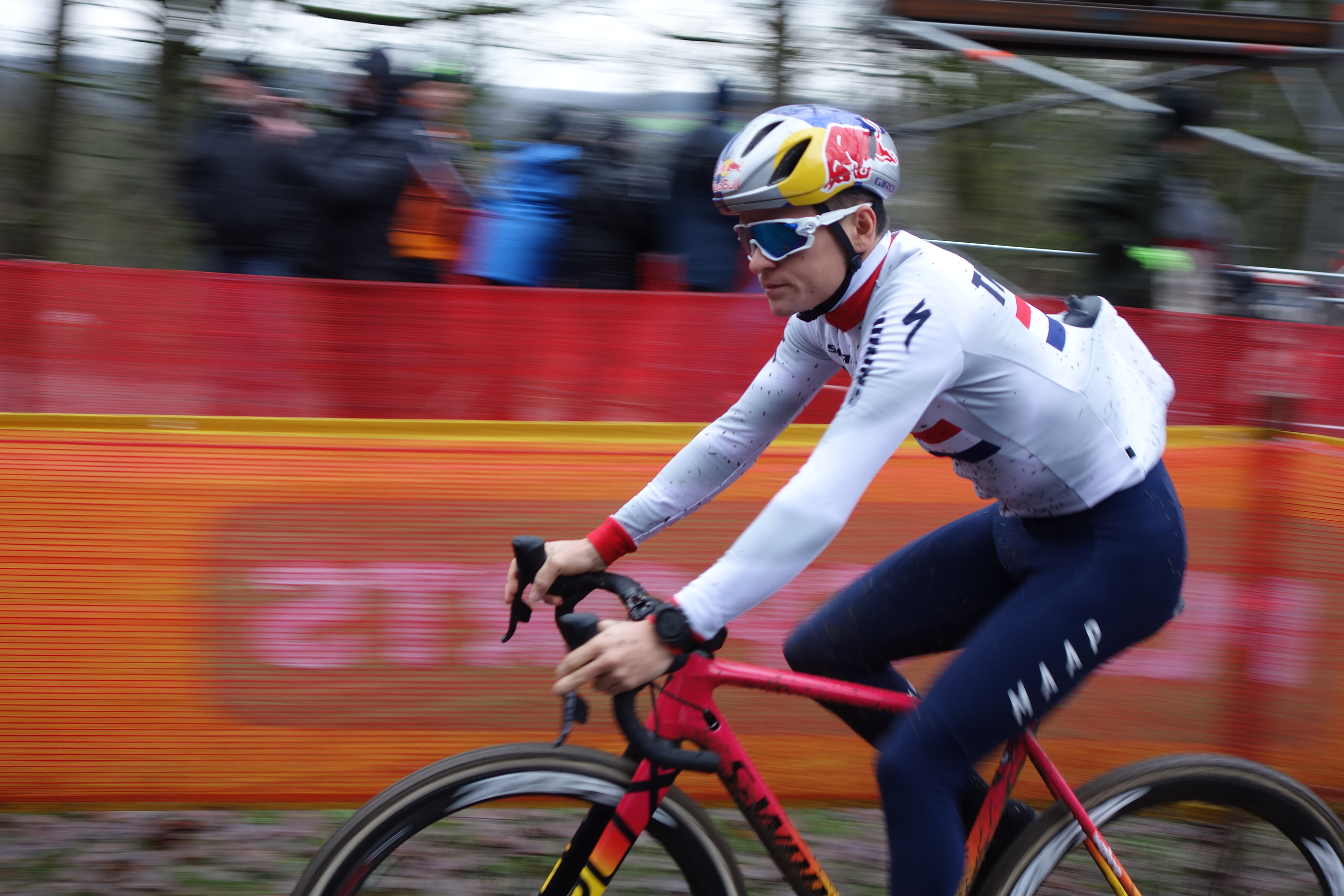
Pidcock racing cyclo-cross at the Citadelcross in 2019.

TP Racing were rebranded to Trinity Racing for the 2019–20 cyclo-cross season, with Pidcock stepping up to a full season of senior elite competition for the first time. He scored four top ten finishes in the Cyclo-cross World Cup, before claiming the silver medal at the World Championships behind Van der Poel, as well as retaining his British national title. In February 2020 it was announced that Pidcock would also ride for Trinity Racing on the road as the team would branch out into road racing for the 2020 season, after Wiggins Le Col folded part way through 2019. After racing in 2020 was interrupted by the COVID-19 pandemic, Pidcock returned to competition in August, making his debut in international mountain biking competition at the French Cup cross-country race at Alpe d'Huez, where he finished ninth, before competing at the Transmaurienne Vanoise, where he finished fourth overall, won three of the five stages and placed on the podium in the other two. On the road, he finished fourth in the Under-23 time trial at the 2020 European Road Championships, before heading to the Giro Ciclistico d'Italia: after losing time on the first stage in hot conditions, he won stage 4 in a breakaway to take the leader's pink jersey, and went on to win stages 7 and 8 to secure the overall race win.

In September, Pidcock rode at the Road World Championships in Imola, where he made his debut in the elite road race as leader of the British team, having been given dispensation to step up after the championships' under-23 and junior races were cancelled due to the Coronavirus pandemic. He finished the 258 km (160 mi) race – the longest one-day race of his career so far – in 42nd place, staying near the front of the peloton for most of the race before fading on the final lap. He stated that he was pleased with his performance and received plaudits from the Team GB's road captain Luke Rowe. The following month he rounded off his season by switching back to mountain biking, making his debut in the Mountain Bike World Cup at Nové Město na Moravě where he won the two under-23 races at the meeting, despite starting from the back of the grid in both races. His fastest lap in each of the races was seven seconds quicker than the fastest riders in the elite races. He then went to the Mountain Bike World Championships in Leogang where he picked up two rainbow jerseys, winning the e-mountain bike world title with a 35-second lead over the second-placed rider before going on to be crowned under-23 world champion by almost two minutes.

Pidock started his 2020–21 cyclo-cross season in November 2020 at Cyklokros Tábor, the first round of that season's World Cup, where he finished 17th after enduring a poor start and crashing midway through the race. The following month he won Cyclo-cross Gavere, his first major senior international win in cyclo-cross. He finished ahead of Mathieu van der Poel, Toon Aerts and Eli Iserbyt, who were the only riders to finish within a minute of Pidcock: the latter described his performance as a "(coming) of age". At the 2021 UCI Cyclo-cross World Championships in Ostend in January, Pidcock narrowly missed out on a medal, finishing fourth, despite closing the gap to the third placed Aerts in the closing stages. Pidcock competed in 13 races in the 2020–21 cyclo-cross season, taking a total of nine podiums.

=== Ineos Grenadiers (2021–2024) ===
In September 2020 INEOS Grenadiers announced that Pidcock would join them from the 2021 season. He was initially scheduled to join the team from 1 March, following the conclusion of the 2020–21 cyclo-cross season. In January 2021, it was announced that Pidcock was to join the team on 1 February.

==== 2021 ====
Pidcock enjoyed a successful start with the team in the spring classics, finishing third in Kuurne–Brussels–Kuurne, fifth in Strade Bianche, and 15th at Milan–San Remo, where he attacked from the leading group on the descent of the Poggio. On 14 April 2021 Pidcock won the Brabanste Pijl, beating Wout van Aert and Matteo Trentin in a three-man sprint to take his first professional win, and in the Amstel Gold Race Pidcock came second after a photo finish behind Wout van Aert. He went on to take another top ten finish at Flèche Wallonne, placing sixth despite crashing 28 km (17 mi) from the finish.

After the spring classics, Pidcock switched to mountain bike racing as part of his preparation for competing in the discipline at the 2020 Summer Olympics. In his first appearance in the elite category of the Mountain Bike World Cup in Albstadt, Pidcock moved forward from his starting position of 76th in the field to lead the race at the start of the third lap before eventually crossing the finish line in fifth. At the second round of the 2021 Mountain Bike World Cup in Nové Město in May, Pidcock took the win, being the only rider who could keep pace with Mathieu van der Poel for the first two laps, before attacking the Dutch rider on the third and crossing the finish line a minute ahead of Van der Poel. At the end of May Pidcock broke his collarbone in a training crash that prevented him from returning to the road in the Tour de Suisse the following month, however following surgery he was able to return to training on the road after just over a week. At the Olympics in July, Pidcock took the gold medal in the cross-country mountain bike competition, taking the lead midway through the race and crossing the finish line 20 seconds ahead of second placed Mathias Flückiger. This was the first ever Olympic medal for a British rider in mountain biking, and Pidcock also became the youngest rider to win an Olympic mountain bike title, being 79 days younger than Jenny Rissveds when she was crowned Olympic champion at the 2016 Summer Olympics.

Pidcock was named in the Ineos Grenadiers squad for the 2021 Vuelta a España, which he finished 67th on GC.

==== 2022 ====
Pidcock was appointed Member of the Order of the British Empire (MBE) in the 2022 New Year Honours for services to cycling.

Pidcock started his cyclo-cross season in early December at Cyclo-cross Boom, and competed in 12 races leading up to the world championships. He won his first elite World Cup in Rupchen and took another world cup win in Hulst. Overall he finished 11th in the world cup standings; despite only participating in 5 out of 15 rounds. In January he skipped defending his British championship to attend the Ineos Grenadiers training camp. After the training camp he returned to compete in the X20 trofee in Hamme and the World Cup in Hoogerheide. At the World Championships Pidcock entered as a top favourite with Eli Iserbyt. Pidcock was outnumbered by the Belgian team at the front of the race, but rode away to take the win, posing as Superman across the finish line.

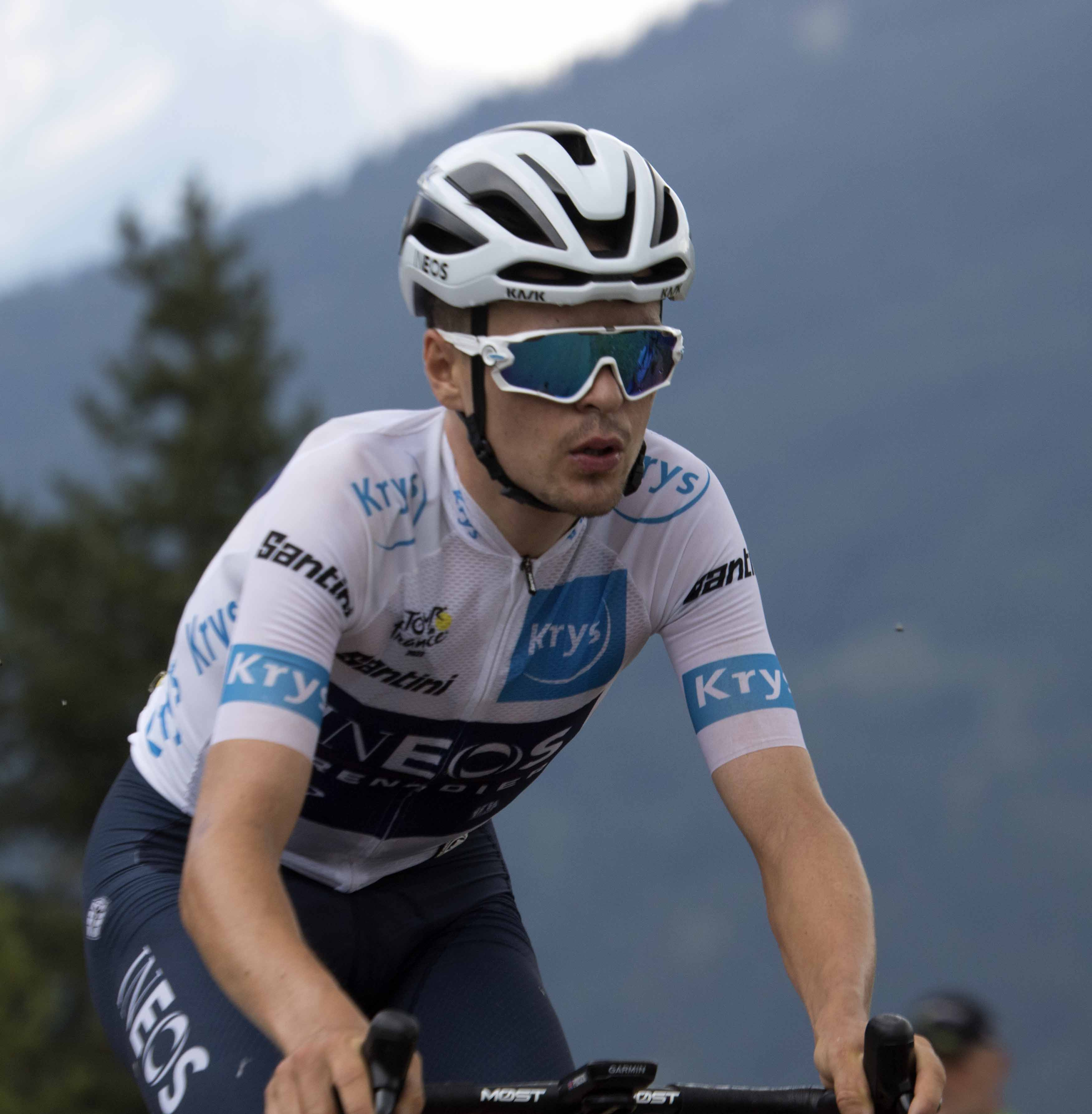
Pidcock wearing the white jersey (on behalf of Tadej Pogačar) during Stage 13 of the Tour de France in 2022.

During the 2022 road cycling season Pidcock entered seven classic races as well as three out of the four early season Monuments and had what could best be described as average results all the way around. In the Monuments he finished at the back of the group in Liège–Bastogne–Liège, he finished outside the top 10 in the Tour of Flanders and abandoned Milan–San Remo where he began to feel sick as the race progressed. In the Flanders Classics he did not fare much better finishing in the middle of the pack in Kuurne–Brussels–Kuurne and Gent–Wevelgem and then finishing outside the top 10 in the 2022 Omloop Het Nieuwsblad and Amstel Gold Race. His best results were a podium finish in 2022 Dwars door Vlaanderen behind Benoot and van der Poel, after which he stated that he doesn't fully understand the cycling classics just yet. He also recorded a top 5 in Brabantse Pijl, where he had to stay back as his teammate Magnus Sheffield was up the road on a solo attack going for the win.

He was named to the Ineos Grenadiers start list for the 2022 Tour de France. During the Tour he survived the cobbles of stage 5 and by the end of the first week was in the top 10 overall. After the first major high mountain stage, which culminated on the Col du Granon, he fell out of the top 10, but was riding well enough to seem like he would be instrumental in supporting Geraint Thomas, who was seemingly riding strong enough to be in contention for a podium finish. On stage 12, which was Bastille Day in France and included a mountain top finish on Alpe d'Huez, he joined the veteran four-time former Tour champion Chris Froome and bridged up to the breakaway. The escape group included several strong and veteran riders with Giulio Ciccone, Louis Meintjes and Neilson Powless being among them. About halfway up the final climb he attacked in an effort to go for the solo stage win. His attack succeeded and he claimed what is arguably the biggest stage victory in all of cycling and his name will be added to the permanent memorial of stage winners on one of the signs lining the 21 hairpin turns of the route. This victory made him the youngest rider to ever win on Alpe d'Huez and moved him back up to 8th place overall. Into the third week his position in the overall standings became less important with two teammates ahead of him in Yates and Thomas, who rode stronger as the race progressed. By the final time trial he was still 2nd in the young rider classification to Tadej Pogačar, but not in contention for the winning of the jersey.

==== 2023 ====
On 4 March 2023 Pidcock won Strade Bianche following a solo attack from 20 kilometres out. Pidcock was the first British rider to win the event.

==== 2024 ====
In July 2024, at the Paris Olympics, Pidcock was the favourite to win the cross-country mountain bike event despite withdrawing from Tour de France due to Covid 16 days earlier. He was leading in the fourth lap when he suffered a puncture, which left him trailing Victor Koretzky of France by 39 seconds in 9th place. Pidcock managed to make up the deficit, and the lead changed a few times between Pidcock and Koretzky towards the end. Koretzky was leading with 400m to go, and Pidcock took a chance to move ahead of Koretzky by taking the inside line past a tree, but the two collided causing Koretzky to unclip from his pedal. This allowed Pidcock to race ahead to the finishing line, to the displeasure of the French crowd. The consensus was that there had been no wrongdoing by anyone, and Pidcock won the Olympic gold medal for the second time. As with his previous Olympic victory, Pidcock prepared for the event with Belgian coach Kurt Bogaerts with whom he had been working since 2018. Bogaerts had joined Ineos in 2021 to work more closely with Pidcock across all disciplines, and would later follow Pidcock to Q36.5 Pro Cycling Team in 2025.

In October, Pidcock competed in the Giro dell'Emilia and finished on the podium in second place. He finished 15th at the Gran Piemonte five days later. It was anticipated that he would also race in Il Lombardia two days later, on 12 October, but he described on social media that he had been "deselected" from the Ineos Grenadiers line-up. This fuelled ongoing speculation that Pidcock would be parting ways with the team. On 4 December, it was announced that Pidcock would be leaving Ineos at the end of the season, despite having signed a five-year deal with the team in 2022. It was later announced that Pidcock had signed a three-year contract with Q36.5 Pro Cycling Team.

Pidcock was appointed Officer of the Order of the British Empire (OBE) in the 2025 New Year Honours for services to cycling.

=== Q36.5 Pro Cycling Team (2025–) ===
==== 2025 ====
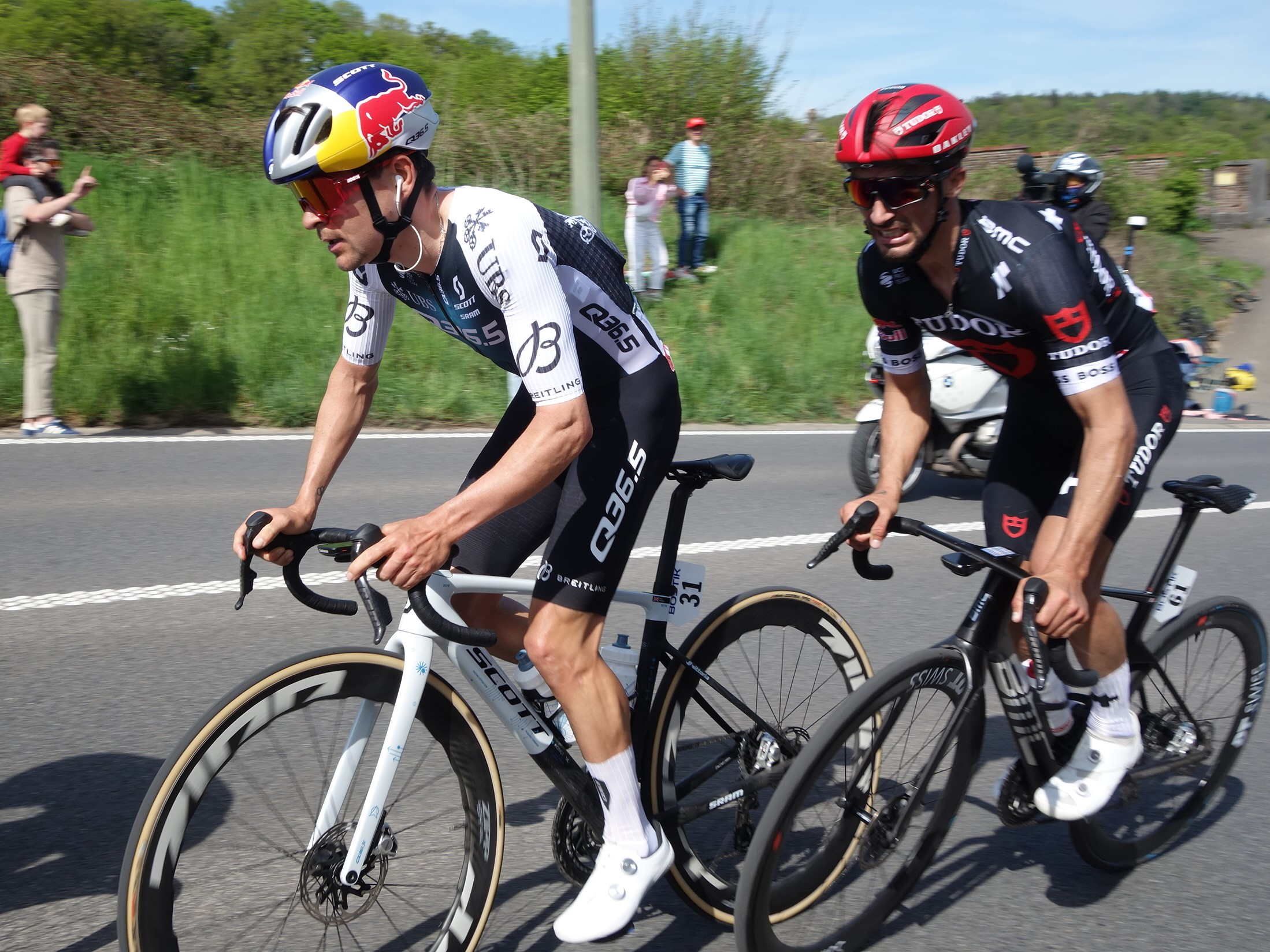
Pidcock (left) at the 2025 Liège–Bastogne–Liège

On 22 January, the Q36.5 team announced that Pidcock's first race for the squad would be at the 2025 AlUla Tour. He won stages two and four on the way to his first elite general classification victory. He took the lead after stage two and held it until the end of the race, also winning the points classification.

On 20 February, Pidcock won stage two of the Vuelta a Andalucía in an uphill sprint ahead of former Ineos teammate Brandon Rivera and would finish third in the general classification. He finished second to reigning World Champion Tadej Pogačar at Strade Bianche on 8 March, a race the pair had dominated in recent years. After Pogačar misjudged a corner and slid along the road before tumbling into a field, Pidcock slowed to wait for the scraped and bloodied Slovenian who would later ride away to a solo victory.

Pidcock finished third overall at the 2025 Vuelta a España behind Jonas Vingegaard and João Almeida, taking his first podium finish on a Grand Tour. He performed consistently in the mountains and held off the challenge from Jai Hindley in the final two weeks.

==== 2026 ====
On 18 March 2026, Pidcock won Milano–Torino. Four days later Pidcock rode Milan–San Remo. Pidcock along with Mathieu van der Poel were able to follow an attack by Tadej Pogačar made his move with 24 km (15 mi) to go and 2.5 km (1.6 mi) from the top of the Cipressa. The trio worked together to keep the peloton at bay before reaching the foot of the Poggio with an advantage of 10 seconds. On the climb, Pogačar successfully dropped van der Poel with his first attack. He attacked a few more times to shake off Pidcock but to no avail, with the duo reaching the top of the Poggio with a lead of around 20 seconds. On the Via Roma, Pogačar started his sprint with 200 m (660 ft) left, managing to hold off Pidcock by half a wheel to win the race.

== Personal life ==
He is the son of cycling team manager Giles Pidcock and brother of fellow cyclist Joe Pidcock.

Pidcock lives in Andorra with his partner Bethany and their dogs Chestnut and Acorn. During the winter cyclocross season, he resides in Belgium.

== Career achievements ==
=== Major championships timeline ===
Event		2018	2019	2020	2021	2022	2023	2024	2025	2026
Olympic Games	MTB XC	Not held			1	Not held		1	Not held	
Olympic Games	Road race	Not held			—	Not held		13	Not held	
World Championships	Cyclo-cross	—	—	2	4	1	—	—	—	—
World Championships	MTB XC	—	—	—	—	4	1	3	—	1
World Championships	Road race	—	—	42	6	—	—	57	10	7
European Championships	Cyclo-cross	—	8	—	—	—	—	—	—	—
European Championships	MTB XC	—	—	—	—	1	—	—	1	—
European Championships	Road race	—	—	55	—	—	—	—	—	—
National Championships	Cyclo-cross	—	1	1	NH	—	—	—	—	—
National Championships	MTB XC	—	—	NH	—	—	—	—	—	—
National Championships	Road race	38	43	NH	—	—	—	—	—	—

=== Cyclo-cross ===
2015–2016
Junior National Trophy Series

1st Derby
1st Durham
1st Ipswich
1st Bradford

UCI Junior World Cup

2nd Hoogerheide

5th UCI World Junior Championships
2016–2017
1st UCI World Junior Championships
1st UEC European Junior Championships
1st National Junior Championships
3rd Overall UCI Junior World Cup

1st Namur
1st Hoogerheide
3rd Zeven

Junior Superprestige

1st Zonhoven

Junior DVV Trophy

1st Hamme

Junior Brico Cross

1st Hulst
1st Kruibeke

Junior Soudal Classics

1st Hasselt

Junior National Trophy Series

1st Derby
1st Houghton-Le-Spring

2017–2018 (1 pro win)
1st National Under-23 Championships
1st Overall UCI Under-23 World Cup

1st Koksijde
1st Bogense
1st Namur
1st Heusden-Zolder
2nd Hoogerheide

Under-23 Superprestige

1st Boom
1st Gavere
1st Diegem
1st Middelkerke

Under-23 DVV Trophy

1st Koppenberg
2nd Loenhout
3rd Baal

National Trophy Series

1st Abergavenny

2nd UEC European Under-23 Championships
2018–2019 (1)
1st UCI World Under-23 Championships
1st UEC European Under-23 Championships
1st National Championships
1st Overall UCI Under-23 World Cup

1st Tábor
1st Koksijde
1st Namur
1st Pontchâteau

Under-23 DVV Trophy

1st Lille

Superprestige

1st Under-23 classification

2nd Zonnebeke
Brico Cross

3rd Hulst

2019–2020 (1)
1st National Championships
2nd UCI World Championships
DVV Trophy

2nd Koppenberg
3rd Baal

Ethias Cross

2nd Hulst
3rd Beringen
3rd Essen

2nd Ardooie
2nd Overijse
Superprestige

1st Under-23 classification
3rd Boom

Rectavit Series

3rd Sint-Niklaas

UCI World Cup

4th Namur
5th Nommay

2020–2021 (1)
Superprestige

1st Gavere

2nd Gullegem
UCI World Cup

3rd Namur
3rd Hulst
3rd Overijse

X²O Badkamers Trophy

3rd Antwerpen
3rd Baal

Ethias Cross

3rd Essen

4th UCI World Championships
2021–2022 (4)
1st UCI World Championships
UCI World Cup

1st Rucphen
1st Hulst
2nd Namur
3rd Val di Sole
3rd Hoogerheide

1st Gullegem
X²O Badkamers Trophy

2nd Baal
2nd Herentals

Superprestige

2nd Heusden-Zolder

2022–2023 (2)
Superprestige

1st Boom
2nd Diegem

X²O Badkamers Trophy

1st Kortrijk
3rd Baal

UCI World Cup

2nd Overijse
3rd Dublin
3rd Gavere
5th Benidorm

Exact Cross

3rd Mol
3rd Loenhout

2023–2024 (1)
UCI World Cup

1st Namur
3rd Gavere

Superprestige

2nd Diegem

X²O Badkamers Trophy

2nd Herentals

==== UCI World Cup results ====
Season	1	2	3	4	5	6	7	8	9	10	11	12	13	14	15	16	Rank	Points
2019–2020	IOW —	WAT —	BER —	TAB; 14	KOK; 10	NAM; 4	ZOL —	NOM; 5	HOO; 7								20	242
2020–2021	WAT; NH	DUB; NH	ZON; NH	KOK; NH	BES; NH	TAB; 17	ANT; NH	NAM; 3	DIE; NH	DEN; DNF	HUL; 3	VIL; NH	HOO; NH	OVE; 3			7	84
2021–2022	WAT —	FAY —	IOW —	ZON —	OVE —	TAB —	KOK —	ANT; NH	BES —	VAL; 3	RUC; 1	NAM; 2	DEN; 8	HUL; 1	FLA —	HOO; 3	11	178
2022–2023	WAT —	FAY —	TAB —	MAA —	BER —	OVE; 2	HUL; DNF	ANT; 8	DUB; 3	VAL —	GAV; 3	ZON —	BEN; 5	BES —			13	119
2023–2024	WAT —	MAA —	DEN —	TRO —	DUB —	FLA —	VAL —	NAM; 1	ANT; 8	GAV; 3	HUL; 25	ZON —	BEN; 9	HOO —			18	101

=== Gravel ===
2025
1st Stage 5 Nedbank Gravel Burn
6th UCI World Championships

=== Mountain bike ===
2019
1st Cross-country, National Under-23 Championships
2020
1st Cross-country, UCI World E-MTB Championships
1st Cross-country, UCI World Under-23 Championships
UCI Under-23 XCO World Cup

1st Nové Město I
1st Nové Město II

Under-23 French Cup

1st Alpe d'Huez

4th Overall Transmaurienne Vanoise

1st Under-23 classification
1st Stages 3, 4 & 5

2021 (3 pro wins)
1st Cross-country, Olympic Games
UCI XCO World Cup

1st Nové Město
5th Albstadt

Swiss Bike Cup

1st Leukerbad

UCI XCC World Cup

2nd Nové Město

2022 (3)
1st Cross-country, UEC European Championships
UCI XCO World Cup

1st Albstadt
1st Nové Město

UCI XCC World Cup

2nd Nové Město

4th Cross-country, UCI World Championships
2023 (5)
UCI World Championships

1st Cross-country
3rd Short track

UCI XCO World Cup

1st Nové Město
1st Mont-Sainte-Anne
3rd Pal–Arinsal
5th Snowshoe

UCI XCC World Cup

1st Nové Město

Ökk Bike Revolution

1st Chur

XCC French Cup

3rd Guéret

2024 (5)
1st Cross-country, Olympic Games
UCI XCO World Cup

1st Nové Město
1st Crans-Montana

UCI XCC World Cup

1st Crans-Montana

Shimano Super Cup

1st La Nucia

3rd Cross-country, UCI World Championships
2025 (2)
1st Cross-country, UEC European Championships
UCI XCO World Cup

1st Pal–Arinsal

2026 (2)
1st Cross-country, UCI World Championships
UCI XCO World Cup

1st Nové Město

UCI XCC World Cup

2nd Nové Město

==== UCI World Cup results ====
Season	1	2	3	4	5	6	7	8	9	10	Rank	Points
2021	ALB; 5	NOV; 1	LEO —	LES; DNF	LEN —	SNO —					18	517
2022	PET —	ALB; 1	NOV; 1	LEO —	LEN —	AND —	SNO —	MON —	VAL —		24	600
2023	NOV; 1	LEN —	LEO —	VAL —	AND; 3	LES —	SNO; 5	MON; 1			9	976
2024	MAI —	ARA —	NOV; 1	VAL —	CRA; 1	LES —	LAK —	MON —			25	616
2025	ARA —	ARA —	NOV —	LEO —	VAL —	AND; 1	LES —	LEN —	LAK —	MON —	57	250
2026	KOR —	NOV; 1	LEO —	LEN —	THU —	AND —	LES —	SLC —	LAK —		42	315

=== Road ===
2016
1st La Philippe Gilbert Juniors
10th Overall Trofeo Karlsberg
2017
1st Time trial, UCI World Junior Championships
1st Overall Grand Prix Rüebliland

1st Points classification
1st Stage 3 (ITT)

1st Paris–Roubaix Juniors
2nd Road race, National Junior Championships
2nd Overall Aubel–Thimister–La Gleize

1st Stage 2a (TTT)

4th Overall Driedaagse van Axel
5th Guido Reybrouck Classic
2018
3rd Time trial, National Under-23 Championships
6th Heistse Pijl
9th Rutland–Melton CiCLE Classic
2019
1st Overall Tour Alsace

1st Young rider classification
1st Stage 2

1st Paris–Roubaix Espoirs
3rd Road race, UCI World Under-23 Championships
3rd Overall Le Triptyque des Monts et Châteaux

1st Points classification
1st Stage 2b

5th Rutland–Melton CiCLE Classic
9th Overall Paris–Arras Tour
2020
1st Overall Giro Ciclistico d'Italia

1st Mountains classification
1st Stages 4, 7 & 8

4th Time trial, UEC European Under-23 Championships
2021 (1 pro win)
1st Brabantse Pijl
2nd Amstel Gold Race
3rd Kuurne–Brussels–Kuurne
5th Strade Bianche
6th Road race, UCI World Championships
6th La Flèche Wallonne
2022 (1)
Tour de France

1st Stage 12
Combativity award Stage 12

2nd Overall Tour of Britain

1st Points classification

3rd Dwars door Vlaanderen
5th Brabantse Pijl
2023 (2)
1st Strade Bianche
2nd Liège–Bastogne–Liège
3rd Amstel Gold Race
5th Omloop Het Nieuwsblad
7th Overall Volta ao Algarve

1st Stage 4

2024 (1)
1st Amstel Gold Race
2nd Giro dell'Emilia
4th Strade Bianche
6th Overall Tour de Suisse
6th Overall Volta ao Algarve
8th Omloop Het Nieuwsblad
9th Overall Tirreno–Adriatico
10th Liège–Bastogne–Liège
2025 (5)
1st Overall AlUla Tour

1st Points classification
1st Stages 2 & 4

2nd Overall Arctic Race of Norway

1st Stage 3

2nd Strade Bianche
2nd Giro dell'Emilia
3rd Overall Vuelta a España

Combativity award Stage 11

3rd Overall Vuelta a Andalucía

1st Stage 2

3rd La Flèche Wallonne
6th Overall Tirreno–Adriatico
6th Giro di Lombardia
9th Liège–Bastogne–Liège
9th Amstel Gold Race
10th Road race, UCI World Championships
10th Andorra MoraBanc Clàssica
2026 (5)
1st Milano–Torino
1st GP Industria & Artigianato di Larciano
1st Andorra MoraBanc Clàssica
1st Stage 3 Tour of the Alps
2nd Overall Tour of Guangxi
2nd Milan–San Remo
2nd Eschborn–Frankfurt
2nd Giro dell'Emilia
2nd Tre Valli Varesine
2nd Clásica Jaén Paraíso Interior
3rd Overall Vuelta a Andalucía

1st Stage 5

4th Grand Prix Cycliste de Québec
6th Giro di Lombardia
6th Grand Prix Cycliste de Montréal
7th Road race, UCI World Championships
7th Strade Bianche
9th Overall Tour de France

Combativity award Stage 13

==== General classification results timeline ====
Grand Tour general classification results
Grand Tour	2021	2022	2023	2024	2025	2026
Giro d'Italia	—	—	—	—	16	—
Tour de France	—	16	13	DNF	—	9
Vuelta a España	67	—	—	—	3	—
Major stage race general classification results
Major stage race	2021	2022	2023	2024	2025	2026
Paris–Nice	—	—	—	—	—	—
Tirreno–Adriatico	—	—	DNF	9	6	—
Volta a Catalunya	—	—	—	—	—	DNF
Tour of the Basque Country	—	—	—	—	—	—
Tour de Romandie	—	—	—	—	—	—
Critérium du Dauphiné	—	—	—	—	—	—
Tour de Suisse	—	DNF	22	6	—	—

==== Classics results timeline ====
Monument	2021	2022	2023	2024	2025	2026
Milan–San Remo	15	DNF	—	11	40	2
Tour of Flanders	41	14	52	—	—	—
Paris–Roubaix	—	—	—	17	—	—
Liège–Bastogne–Liège	—	103	2	10	9	101
Giro di Lombardia	—	—	—	—	6	6
Classic	2021	2022	2023	2024	2025	2026
Omloop Het Nieuwsblad	55	18	5	8	38	48
Kuurne–Brussels–Kuurne	3	70	—	—	—	—
Strade Bianche	5	—	1	4	2	7
Milano–Torino	—	—	—	—	—	1
Dwars door Vlaanderen	43	3	11	—	—	—
Brabantse Pijl	1	5	—	—	11	—
Amstel Gold Race	2	11	3	1	9	—
La Flèche Wallonne	6	DNF	18	DNF	3	—
Eschborn–Frankfurt	—	—	—	—	—	2
Grand Prix Cycliste de Québec	NH	—	—	—	—	4
Grand Prix Cycliste de Montréal	NH	—	—	—	—	6
Giro dell'Emilia	—	—	—	2	2	2
Tre Valli Varesine	—	—	—	NR	40	2

Legend
—	Did not compete
DNF	Did not finish
NH	Not held
NR	No result

Criterium and National races

2016
1st Bath Junior Road Race
Junior Tour of Wales

1st Stages 3 & 5

2nd Overall Acht van Bladel Juniors
4th Overall Isle of Man Junior Tour
4th Ilkley GP
4th Capernwray
4th Herzele-Borsbeke Juniors
5th Overall Bizkaiko Itzulia
6th Sheffield GP
7th Overall Kingdom Junior Classic
2017
1st National Championships
1st Overall Junior Tour of Wales

1st Stages 1 (ITT) & 5

1st Durham, Tour Series
1st Barnsley
1st Lincoln
1st Cadence Junior Road Race
2nd Overall Isle of Man Junior Tour

1st Stage 2

3rd Overall Acht van Bladel Juniors

1st Stage 4

4th Eddie Soens Memorial
4th Junior CiCLE Classic
2018
Tour Series

1st Wembley Park
2nd Salisbury

National Circuit Series

1st Barnsley
2nd Skipton

1st East Cleveland–Klondike GP
1st Doncaster
2nd National Championships
2nd London Nocturne
6th Overall Tour of the Reservoir
2019
National Road Series

2nd Lincoln GP
3rd Stockton

2nd Otley GP
2022
3rd Roeselare

=== Track ===
2017
1st Scratch, National Junior Championships

=== Honours and awards ===
- Laureus World Sports Awards
  - Action Sportsperson of the Year (Winner): 2025
  - Action Sportsperson of the Year (Nominated): 2026
