= 2017 UCI Cyclo-cross World Championships =

Cyclo-cross championship

- Location within Luxembourg
- Venue: Bieles, Luxembourg
- Date: 28–29 January 2017
- Coordinates: 49°31′N 5°56′E
- Events: 5

The 2017 UCI Cyclo-cross World Championships were the World Championship for cyclo-cross for the season 2016–17. It was held in Bieles in Luxembourg on Saturday 28 and Sunday 29 January 2017. The championships featured five events; men's races for elite, under-23 and junior riders, and women's races for elite and under-23 riders.

== Schedule ==
Saturday 28 January 2017

- 11:00 Men's Junior
- 13:00 Women's Under 23
- 15:00 Women's Elite

Sunday 29 January 2017

- 11:00 Men's Under 23
- 15:00 Men's Elite

All times in local time (UTC+1).

== Medal summary ==
=== Medalists ===
Event	Gold		Silver		Bronze	
Men's events
Men's elite race	Wout van Aert; Belgium	1h 02' 08"	Mathieu van der Poel; Netherlands	+ 44"	Kevin Pauwels; Belgium	+ 2' 09"
Men's under-23 race	Joris Nieuwenhuis; Netherlands	53' 58"	Felipe Orts; Spain	+ 1' 23"	Sieben Wouters; Netherlands	+ 1' 29"
Men's junior race	Tom Pidcock; Great Britain	41' 24"	Dan Tulett; Great Britain	+ 38"	Ben Turner; Great Britain	+ 44"
Women's events
Women's elite race	Sanne Cant; Belgium	43' 06"	Marianne Vos; Netherlands	+ 1"	Kateřina Nash; Czech Republic	+ 21"
Women's under-23 race	Annemarie Worst; Netherlands	43' 47"	Ellen Noble; United States	+ 10"	Evie Richards; Great Britain	+ 26"

=== Medal table ===
* Host nation (Luxembourg)

Rank	Nation	Gold	Silver	Bronze	Total
1	Netherlands (NED)	2	2	1	5
2	Belgium (BEL)	2	0	1	3
3	Great Britain (GBR)	1	1	2	4
4	Spain (ESP)	0	1	0	1
4	United States (USA)	0	1	0	1
6	Czech Republic (CZE)	0	0	1	1
Totals (6 entries)		5	5	5	15
