= 2023 Strade Bianche =

2023 UCI World Tour, race 5 of 35
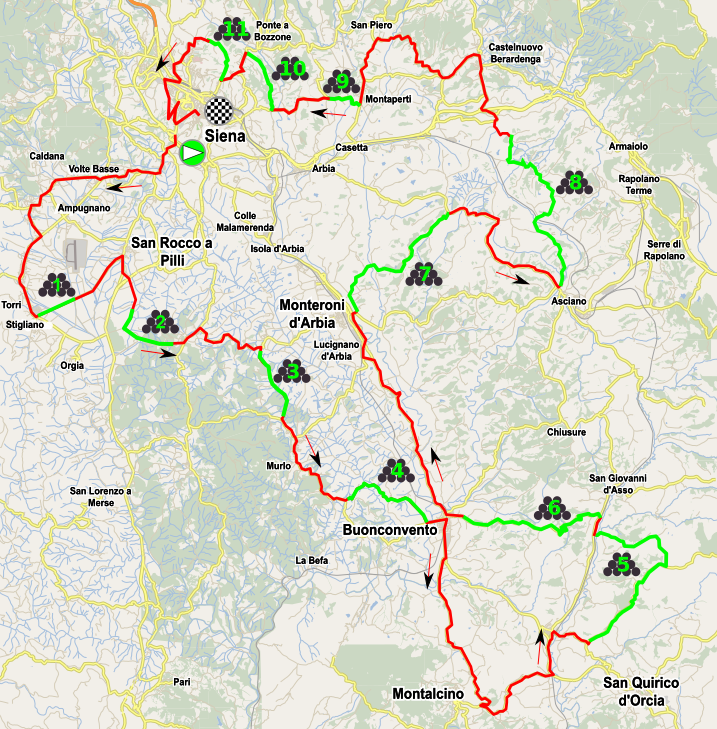

Race details
- Dates: 4 March 2023
- Stages: 1
- Distance: 184 km (114 mi)
- Winning time: 4h 31' 41"

Results
| | Winner | Tom Pidcock (GBR) | (INEOS Grenadiers) |
| | Second | Valentin Madouas (FRA) | (Groupama–FDJ) |
| | Third | Tiesj Benoot (BEL) | (Team Jumbo–Visma) |

The 17th edition of Strade Bianche was held on 4 March 2023. It was the fifth event of the 2023 UCI World Tour. The race was won by British rider Tom Pidcock riding for INEOS Grenadiers following a solo attack from 20 kilometres out. Pidcock was the first British rider to win the event.

== Teams ==
Twenty-five teams participated in the race, all eighteen UCI WorldTeams and seven UCI ProTeams.

UCI WorldTeams

- AG2R Citroën Team
- Alpecin–Deceuninck
- Arkéa–Samsic
- Astana Qazaqstan Team
- Bora–Hansgrohe
- Cofidis
- EF Education–EasyPost
- Groupama–FDJ
- INEOS Grenadiers
- Intermarché–Circus–Wanty
- Movistar Team
- Soudal–Quick-Step
- Team Bahrain Victorious
- Team Jayco–AlUla
- Team DSM
- Team Jumbo–Visma
- Trek–Segafredo
- UAE Team Emirates

UCI ProTeams

- Green Project–Bardiani–CSF–Faizanè
- Eolo–Kometa
- Israel–Premier Tech
- Lotto–Dstny
- Q36.5 Pro Cycling Team
- Team TotalEnergies
- Tudor Pro Cycling Team

== Result ==
Result (1–10)
| Rank | Rider | Team | Time |
|---|---|---|---|
| 1 | Tom Pidcock (GBR) | INEOS Grenadiers | 4h 31' 41" |
| 2 | Valentin Madouas (FRA) | Groupama–FDJ | + 20" |
| 3 | Tiesj Benoot (BEL) | Team Jumbo–Visma | + 22" |
| 4 | Rui Costa (POR) | Intermarché–Circus–Wanty | + 23" |
| 5 | Attila Valter (HUN) | Team Jumbo–Visma | + 23" |
| 6 | Matej Mohorič (SLO) | Team Bahrain Victorious | + 34" |
| 7 | Pello Bilbao (ESP) | Team Bahrain Victorious | + 1' 04" |
| 8 | Romain Grégoire (FRA) | Groupama–FDJ | + 1' 18" |
| 9 | Davide Formolo (ITA) | UAE Team Emirates | + 1' 23" |
| 10 | Andreas Kron (DEN) | Lotto–Dstny | + 1' 35" |
