= Lycée Hubert Clément =

Location
- Esch-sur-Alzette; Luxembourg
- Coordinates: 49°30′10″N 05°58′39″E

Information
- Type: Classical secondary school
- Established: 24 April 1955
- Principal: Jean Theis
- Enrollment: 1030
- Website: www.lhce.lu

Lycée Hubert Clément (English: Hubert Clément High School), abbreviated to LHCE, is a high school in Esch-sur-Alzette, in south-western Luxembourg. It was founded as a single-sex girls school in 1955, paralleling Esch's all-boys school, Lycée de Garçons Esch-sur-Alzette, and was named Lycée de Jeunes Filles à Esch-sur-Alzette. Since the school became coeducational in 1970 and renamed the following year, the gender balance has been steadily eroded, particularly in mathematics (in which the majority of students are now boys).

== Namaste (theater group) ==
The youth theater group of the Lycée Hubert Clément was created in its present form in 1973. In 1991, the group was established, under the name "Namasté", as a separate theater group and community non-profit organisation. Although the group has still its official seat in the school, it is open to all young theater enthusiasts.

== Notable alumni ==
- Viviane Reding – member of the European Commission and member of the European Parliament
- Lydia Mutsch – Luxembourgish Minister of Health and Minister for Equal Opportunities (Bettel Administration), previously deputy mayor of Esch-sur-Alzette
- Désirée Nosbusch - actress
- Simone Asselborn-Bintz - educator and politician
