= Andorra MoraBanc Clàssica =

Cycling race in Andorra

Race details
- Date: June
- Region: Andorra
- Local name: Andorra MoraBanc Clàssica (Spanish)
- Discipline: Road
- Competition: UCI Europe Tour
- Type: One-day race
- Web site: andorramorabancclassica.com/en/

History
- First edition: 2025
- Editions: 2 (as of 2026)
- First winner: Mattias Skjelmose (DEN)
- Most recent: Tom Pidcock (GBR)

The Andorra MoraBanc Clàssica is a one-day road cycling race held annually in Andorra. It is categorized as a 1.1 race as part of the UCI Europe Tour.

The first edition was held in 2025, won by Danish rider Mattias Skjelmose in a small group sprint.

== Winners ==
Year	Country	Rider	Team
2025	Denmark	Mattias Skjelmose	Lidl–Trek
2026	Great Britain	Tom Pidcock	Pinarello–Q36.5 Pro Cycling Team
