= 2024 Amstel Gold Race =

Cycling race

2024 UCI World Tour, race 17 of 35

Race details
- Dates: 14 April 2024
- Stages: 1
- Distance: 253.6 km (157.6 mi)
- Winning time: 5h 58' 17"

Results
	Winner	Tom Pidcock (GBR)	(Ineos Grenadiers)
	Second	Marc Hirschi (SUI)	(UAE Team Emirates)
	Third	Tiesj Benoot (BEL)	(Visma–Lease a Bike)

The 2024 Amstel Gold Race was a road cycling one-day race that took place on 14 April in the Netherlands. It was the 58th edition of the Amstel Gold Race and the 17th event of the 2024 UCI World Tour.

== Teams ==
All eighteen UCI WorldTeams and seven UCI ProTeams took part in the race.

UCI WorldTeams

- Alpecin–Deceuninck
- Arkéa–B&B Hotels
- Astana Qazaqstan Team
- Bora–Hansgrohe
- Cofidis
- Decathlon–AG2R La Mondiale
- EF Education–EasyPost
- Groupama–FDJ
- Ineos Grenadiers
- Intermarché–Wanty
- Lidl–Trek
- Movistar Team
- Soudal–Quick-Step
- Team Bahrain Victorious
- Team dsm–firmenich PostNL
- Team Jayco–AlUla
- UAE Team Emirates
- Visma–Lease a Bike

UCI ProTeams

- Israel–Premier Tech
- Lotto–Dstny
- Q36.5 Pro Cycling Team
- TDT–Unibet Cycling Team
- Team Flanders–Baloise
- Tudor Pro Cycling Team
- Uno-X Mobility

== Result ==
Result
Rank	Rider	Team	Time
1	Thomas Pidcock (GBR)	Ineos Grenadiers	5h 58' 17"
2	Marc Hirschi (SUI)	UAE Team Emirates	+ 0"
3	Tiesj Benoot (BEL)	Visma–Lease a Bike	+ 0"
4	Mauri Vansevenant (BEL)	Soudal–Quick-Step	+ 0"
5	Paul Lapeira (FRA)	Decathlon–AG2R La Mondiale	+ 0"
6	Valentin Madouas (FRA)	Groupama–FDJ	+ 0"
7	Bauke Mollema (NED)	Lidl–Trek	+ 0"
8	Quentin Pacher (FRA)	Groupama–FDJ	+ 0"
9	Pello Bilbao (ESP)	Team Bahrain Victorious	+ 0"
10	Michael Matthews (AUS)	Team Jayco–AlUla	+ 11"
