= Fred Sunnen =

Luxembourgish politician (1939–2014)

Fred Sunnen (11 April 1939 in Differdange – 22 February 2014) was a Luxembourgish politician for the Christian Social People's Party (CSV). He was a member of the national legislature, the Chamber of Deputies, having been first elected in the 1999 election to represent the Sud constituency.

Sunnen was the Mayor of Sanem from 14 May 1997 until 30 November 2005, when he was replaced by Georges Engel of the Luxembourg Socialist Workers' Party. He was a member of the communal council, in which the CSV forms the joint-largest contingent. In the most recent elections, on 9 October 2005, Sunnen won the greatest number of votes of all candidates.

== Footnotes ==
Political offices
Preceded by Mathias Greisch	Mayor of Sanem; 1997 – 2005	Succeeded by Georges Engel
