= 2024 Strade Bianche =

2024 UCI World Tour, race 5 of 35
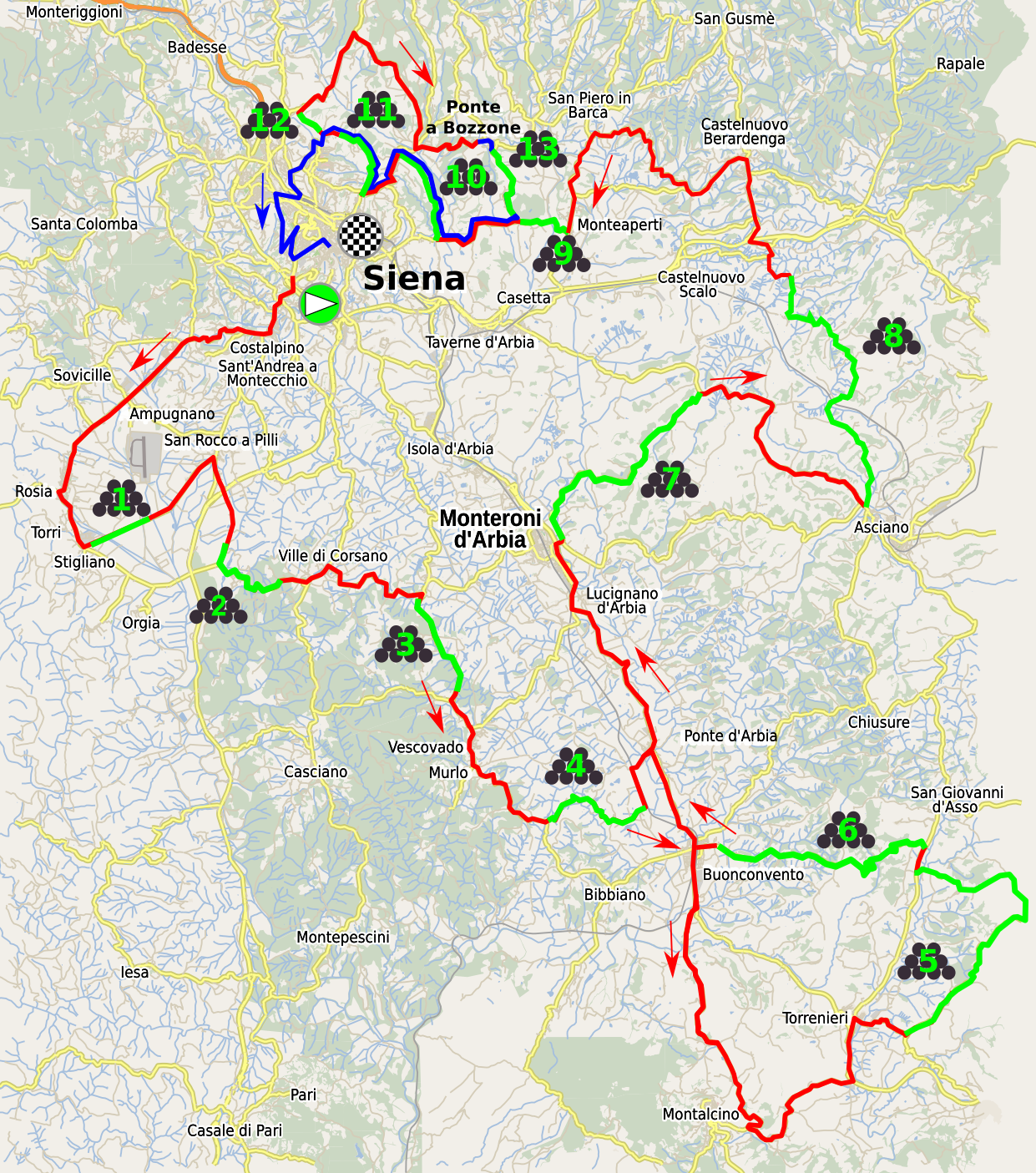
- The race route

Race details
- Dates: 2 March 2024
- Stages: 1
- Distance: 215 km (134 mi)
- Winning time: 5h 19' 45"

Results
	Winner	Tadej Pogačar (SLO)	(UAE Team Emirates)
	Second	Toms Skujiņš (LAT)	(Lidl–Trek)
	Third	Maxim Van Gils (BEL)	(Lotto–Dstny)

The 2024 Strade Bianche was a road cycling one-day race that took place on 2 March in Tuscany, Italy. It was the 18th edition of Strade Bianche and the fifth event of the 2024 UCI World Tour. It was won for the second time by Slovenian Tadej Pogačar following a solo escape of 81 kilometres (50 miles).

== Route ==
The 2024 edition of the race saw significant modifications to its route, incorporating an additional loop and an increased number of gravel sectors, thereby extending the course to cover a total distance of 215 kilometres (134 miles). This edition featured 15 gravel sectors, highlighting the event's characteristic challenge through the 'strade bianche' — the gravel roads of Tuscany.

== Teams ==
Twenty-five teams participated in the race, all eighteen UCI WorldTeams and seven UCI ProTeams.

UCI WorldTeams

- Alpecin–Deceuninck
- Arkéa–B&B Hotels
- Astana Qazaqstan Team
- Bora–Hansgrohe
- Cofidis
- Decathlon–AG2R La Mondiale
- EF Education–EasyPost
- Groupama–FDJ
- INEOS Grenadiers
- Intermarché–Wanty
- Lidl–Trek
- Movistar Team
- Soudal–Quick-Step
- Team Bahrain Victorious
- Team dsm–firmenich PostNL
- Team Jayco–AlUla
- Visma–Lease a Bike
- UAE Team Emirates

UCI ProSeries Teams

- Israel–Premier Tech
- Lotto–Dstny
- Q36.5 Pro Cycling Team
- Team Corratec–Vini Fantini
- Polti–Kometa
- Tudor Pro Cycling Team
- Uno-X Mobility

== Summary ==
The 2024 edition faced uncertain weather, with potential rain affecting the gravel roads. Initially, there were attempts to break away, and a group successfully did so 176km into the race. Despite the extended distance and challenging weather, the main group of cyclists became smaller.

Tadej Pogačar's team, UAE Team Emirates, took charge and set a fast pace. With over two hours remaining, Pogačar made a significant move, establishing a substantial lead. Other teams struggled to catch up due to a lack of coordinated effort and the demanding conditions.

While Pogačar secured an unbeatable lead, the competition for second place was noteworthy. Maxim Van Gils and Toms Skujiņš distinguished themselves from the chasing group. Pogačar claimed victory on his own, and Skujiņš secured second place.

== Result ==
Result (1–10)
Rank	Rider	Team	Time
1	Tadej Pogačar (SLO)	UAE Team Emirates	5h 19' 45"
2	Toms Skujiņš (LAT)	Lidl–Trek	+ 2' 44"
3	Maxim Van Gils (BEL)	Lotto–Dstny	+ 2' 47"
4	Tom Pidcock (GBR)	INEOS Grenadiers	+ 3' 50"
5	Matej Mohorič (SLO)	Team Bahrain Victorious	+ 4' 26"
6	Benoît Cosnefroy (FRA)	Decathlon–AG2R La Mondiale	+ 4' 39"
7	Davide Formolo (ITA)	Movistar Team	+ 4' 41"
8	Lenny Martinez (FRA)	Groupama–FDJ	+ 4' 48"
9	Filippo Zana (ITA)	Team Jayco–AlUla	+ 4' 49"
10	Christophe Laporte (FRA)	Visma–Lease a Bike	+ 5' 17"
