= 2026 GP Industria & Artigianato di Larciano =

- 2026 UCI ProSeries

Race details
- Dates: 7 September 2025
- Stages: 1
- Distance: 196.5 km (122.1 mi)
- Winning time: 4h 33' 08"

Results
	Winner	Tom Pidcock (GBR)	(Pinarello–Q36.5 Pro Cycling Team)
	Second	Christian Scaroni (ITA)	(XDS Astana Team)
	Third	Anthon Charmig (DEN)	(Uno-X Mobility)

The 2026 GP Industria & Artigianato di Larciano (transl. GP Industry & Handicraft of Larciano) was the 57th edition of the GP Industria & Artigianato di Larciano road cycling one-day race that was held on 6 September 2026. It was held as a 1.Pro event on the 2026 UCI ProSeries calendar.

== Teams ==
Eight UCI WorldTeams, eleven UCI ProTeams and four UCI Continental teams made up the twenty-three teams that participated in the race.

UCI WorldTeams

- EF Education–EasyPost
- Groupama–FDJ United
- Movistar Team
- Team Bahrain Victorious
- Team Jayco–AlUla
- UAE Team Emirates XRG
- Uno-X Mobility
- XDS Astana Team

UCI ProTeams

- Bardiani–CSF 7 Saber
- Burgos Burpellet BH
- Caja Rural–Seguros RGA
- Cofidis
- Euskaltel–Euskadi
- Pinarello–Q36.5 Pro Cycling Team
- Solution Tech NIPPO Rali
- Team Polti VisitMalta
- Team TotalEnergies
- Tudor Pro Cycling Team
- Unibet Rose Rockets

UCI Continental Teams

- General Store–Essegibi–Fratelli Curia
- Gragnano Sporting Club
- MBH Bank CSB Telecom Fort
- MG.K Vis Costruzioni e Ambiente

== Result ==
Result
Rank	Rider	Team	Time
1	Tom Pidcock (GBR)	Pinarello–Q36.5 Pro Cycling Team	4h 32' 47"
2	Christian Scaroni (ITA)	XDS Astana Team	+ 12"
3	Anthon Charmig (DEN)	Uno-X Mobility	+ 12"
4	Roger Adrià (ESP)	Movistar Team	+ 12"
5	Alessandro Fancellu (ITA)	MBH Bank CSB Telecom Fort	+ 12"
6	Antonio Tiberi (ITA)	Team Bahrain Victorious	+ 12"
7	Thomas Gachignard (FRA)	Team TotalEnergies	+ 12"
8	Mathys Rondel (FRA)	Tudor Pro Cycling Team	+ 18"
9	Ben O'Connor (AUS)	Team Jayco–AlUla	+ 28"
10	Romain Grégoire (FRA)	Groupama–FDJ United	+ 40'"
