= Ehlerange =

Town in Luxembourg

Coordinates: 49°31′N 5°58′E

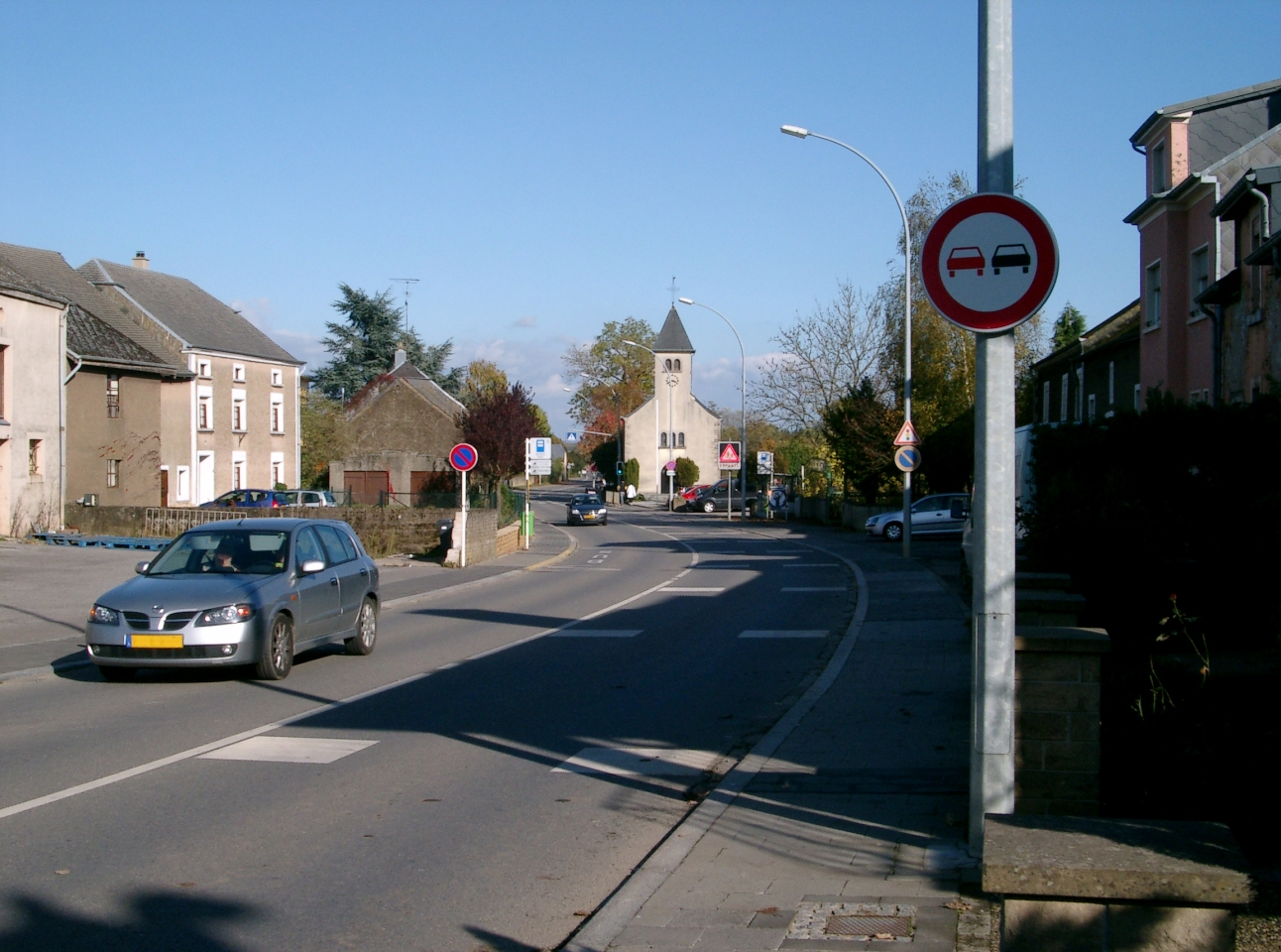

Ehlerange (Luxembourgish: Éilereng, German: Ehleringen) is a small town in the commune of Sanem, in south-western Luxembourg. As of September 2026, the town has a population of 1,011.
