= 2026 Milano–Torino =

- 2026 UCI ProSeries

Race details
- Dates: 18 March 2026
- Stages: 1
- Distance: 174 km (108 mi)
- Winning time: 3h 48' 45"

Results
	Winner	Tom Pidcock (GBR)	(Pinarello–Q36.5 Pro Cycling Team)
	Second	Tobias Halland Johannessen (NOR)	(Uno-X Mobility)
	Third	Primož Roglič (SLO)	(Red Bull–Bora–Hansgrohe)

The 2026 Milano–Torino was the 106th edition of the Milano–Torino cycling classic. It was held on 18 March 2026 as a category 1.Pro race on the 2026 UCI ProSeries calendar.

The race was won by British rider Tom Pidcock of Pinarello–Q36.5 Pro Cycling Team.

== Teams ==
Nine of the 18 UCI WorldTeams, ten UCI ProTeams, and two UCI Continental teams made up the 21 teams that participated in the race.

UCI WorldTeams

- EF Education–EasyPost
- Lidl–Trek
- Lotto–Intermarché
- Movistar Team
- Red Bull–Bora–Hansgrohe
- Team Jayco–AlUla
- UAE Team Emirates XRG
- Uno-X Mobility
- XDS Astana Team

UCI ProTeams

- Bardiani–CSF 7 Saber
- Caja Rural–Seguros RGA
- Cofidis
- MBH Bank CSB Telecom Fort
- Pinarello–Q36.5 Pro Cycling Team
- Solution Tech NIPPO Rali
- Team Polti VisitMalta
- Team TotalEnergies
- Tudor Pro Cycling Team
- Unibet Rose Rockets

UCI Continental Teams

- Biesse–Carrera–Premac
- Team Ukyo

== Result ==
Result (1–10)
Rank	Rider	Team	Time
1	Tom Pidcock (GBR)	Pinarello–Q36.5 Pro Cycling Team	3h 48' 45"
2	Tobias Halland Johannessen (NOR)	Uno-X Mobility	+ 4"
3	Primož Roglič (SLO)	Red Bull–Bora–Hansgrohe	+ 5"
4	Giulio Pellizzari (ITA)	Red Bull–Bora–Hansgrohe	+ 11"
5	Cian Uijtdebroeks (BEL)	Movistar Team	+ 13"
6	Jefferson Alexander Cepeda (ECU)	EF Education–EasyPost	+ 15"
7	Sebastian Berwick (AUS)	Caja Rural–Seguros RGA	+ 18"
8	Lorenzo Fortunato (ITA)	XDS Astana Team	+ 25"
9	Alessandro Fancellu (ITA)	MBH Bank CSB Telecom Fort	+ 36"
10	Michael Storer (AUS)	Tudor Pro Cycling Team	+ 41"
