= 2024 Giro dell'Emilia =

2024 UCI ProSeries

Race details
- Dates: 5 October 2024
- Stages: 1
- Distance: 215.3 km (133.8 mi)
- Winning time: 5h 14' 44"

Results
| | Winner | Tadej Pogačar (SLO) | (UAE Team Emirates) |
| | Second | Tom Pidcock (GBR) | (Ineos Grenadiers) |
| | Third | Davide Piganzoli (ITA) | (Polti–Kometa) |

The 2024 Giro dell'Emilia was the 107th edition of the Giro dell'Emilia road cycling one day race, which was held on 5 October 2024 as part of the 2024 UCI ProSeries calendar.

== Teams ==
Fifteen UCI WorldTeams, eight UCI ProTeams and one UCI Continental team made up the twenty-four teams that participated in the race.

UCI WorldTeams

- Alpecin–Deceuninck
- Astana Qazaqstan Team
- Cofidis
- Decathlon–AG2R La Mondiale
- EF Education–EasyPost
- Groupama–FDJ
- Ineos Grenadiers
- Lidl–Trek
- Movistar Team
- Red Bull–Bora–Hansgrohe
- Soudal–Quick-Step
- Team Bahrain Victorious
- Team Jayco–AlUla
- UAE Team Emirates
- Visma–Lease a Bike

UCI ProTeams

- Bingoal WB
- Team Corratec–Vini Fantini
- Euskaltel–Euskadi
- Israel–Premier Tech
- Q36.5 Pro Cycling Team
- Polti–Kometa
- Tudor Pro Cycling Team
- VF Group–Bardiani–CSF–Faizanè

UCI Continental Teams

- Petrolike

== Results ==
Result
| Rank | Rider | Team | Time |
|---|---|---|---|
| 1 | Tadej Pogačar (SLO) | UAE Team Emirates | 5h 14' 44" |
| 2 | Tom Pidcock (GBR) | Ineos Grenadiers | + 1' 54" |
| 3 | Davide Piganzoli (ITA) | Polti–Kometa | + 1' 54" |
| 4 | Michael Woods (CAN) | Israel–Premier Tech | + 1' 54" |
| 5 | Simon Yates (GBR) | Team Jayco–AlUla | + 2' 02" |
| 6 | Roger Adrià (ESP) | Red Bull–Bora–Hansgrohe | + 2' 04" |
| 7 | Wilco Kelderman (NED) | Visma–Lease a Bike | + 2' 04" |
| 8 | Enric Mas (ESP) | Movistar Team | + 2' 08" |
| 9 | Archie Ryan (IRL) | EF Education–EasyPost | + 2' 13" |
| 10 | Lorenzo Fortunato (ITA) | Astana Qazaqstan Team | + 2' 15" |
