= 2021 Brabantse Pijl =

2021 UCI Europe Tour 2021 UCI ProSeries
- Event poster with previous winners Grace Brown and Julian Alaphilippe

Race details
- Dates: 14 April 2021
- Stages: 1
- Distance: 201.7 km (125.3 mi)
- Winning time: 4h 36' 27"

Results
	Winner	Tom Pidcock (GBR)	(INEOS Grenadiers)
	Second	Wout van Aert (BEL)	(Team Jumbo–Visma)
	Third	Matteo Trentin (ITA)	(UAE Team Emirates)

The 2021 Brabantse Pijl was the 61st edition of the Brabantse Pijl cycle race and was held on 14 April 2021. The race covered 201.7 km (125.3 mi), starting in Leuven and finishing in Overijse.

The top two finishers of the two previous editions, last year's winner Julian Alaphilippe and 2019 winner Mathieu van der Poel were absent.

== Teams ==
Seventeen of the nineteen UCI WorldTeams and six UCI ProTeams made up the twenty-three teams that participated in the race. B&B Hotels p/b KTM, Team Bahrain Victorious, and Trek–Segafredo were the only teams to not have the maximum of seven riders, as they fielded six riders each. There were 112 finishers from the field of 158 riders.

UCI WorldTeams

- AG2R Citroën Team
- Bora–Hansgrohe
- Cofidis
- Deceuninck–Quick-Step
- EF Education–Nippo
- Groupama–FDJ
- INEOS Grenadiers
- Intermarché–Wanty–Gobert Matériaux
- Israel Start-Up Nation
- Lotto–Soudal
- Team Bahrain Victorious
- Team BikeExchange
- Team DSM
- Team Jumbo–Visma
- Team Qhubeka Assos
- Trek–Segafredo
- UAE Team Emirates

UCI ProTeams

- Alpecin–Fenix
- B&B Hotels p/b KTM
- Bingoal Pauwels Sauces WB
- Sport Vlaanderen–Baloise
- Total Direct Énergie
- Uno-X Pro Cycling Team

== Result ==
Result
Rank	Rider	Team	Time
1	Tom Pidcock (GBR)	INEOS Grenadiers	4h 36' 27"
2	Wout van Aert (BEL)	Team Jumbo–Visma	+ 0"
3	Matteo Trentin (ITA)	UAE Team Emirates	+ 2"
4	Ide Schelling (NED)	Bora–Hansgrohe	+ 7"
5	Toms Skujiņš (LAT)	Trek–Segafredo	+ 7"
6	Robert Stannard (AUS)	Team BikeExchange	+ 7"
7	Dylan Teuns (BEL)	Team Bahrain Victorious	+ 7"
8	Benoît Cosnefroy (FRA)	AG2R Citroën Team	+ 7"
9	Oscar Riesebeek (NED)	Alpecin–Fenix	+ 7"
10	Andreas Leknessund (NOR)	Team DSM	+ 12"
