= Roger Adrià =

Spanish competitive cyclist

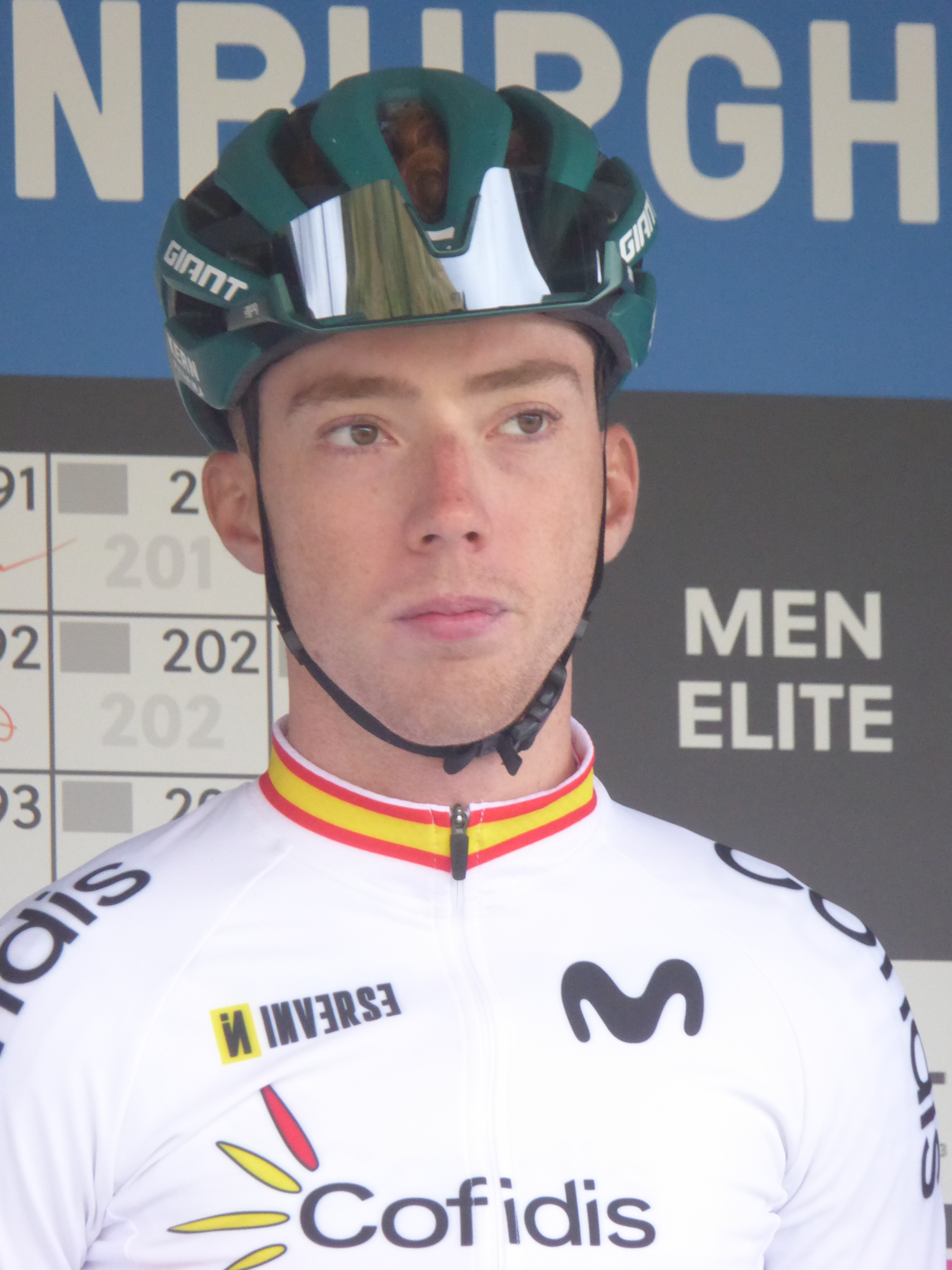
- Adrià in 2023

Personal information
- Full name: Roger Adrià Oliveras
- Born: 18 April 1998 (age 28) Barcelona, Spain
- Height: 1.78 m (5 ft 10 in)
- Weight: 65 kg (143 lb)

Cycling career
- Sport: Cycling
- Current team: Movistar Team
- Discipline: Road
- Role: Rider
- Rider type: Puncheur

Amateur teams
- –2016: Huesca La Magia
- 2017–2019: Lizarte

Professional teams
- 2020–2023: Equipo Kern Pharma
- 2024–2025: Bora–Hansgrohe
- 2026-: Movistar Team

Major wins
- One-day races and Classics GP de Wallonie (2024)

Roger Adrià Oliveras (born 18 April 1998) is a Spanish cyclist, who currently rides for UCI WorldTeam Movistar Team.

In August 2020, on stage 3 of the Vuelta a Burgos, Adrià was part of the stage's main breakaway of nine riders. Late into the stage, he dropped his fellow breakaway riders and nearly stayed away for the surprise win, but he was caught on the slopes of Picón Blanco with several kilometers left by the general classification contenders. Nevertheless, Adrià was noted for his solo effort and won the stage's combativity award.

== Major results ==
2017
7th Overall Volta a Portugal do Futuro

1st Young rider classification

2018
2nd Time trial, National Under-23 Road Championships
2019
1st Gran Premio San Lorenzo
1st Memorial Pascual Momparler
National Under-23 Road Championships

4th Road race
5th Time trial

2020
1st Young rider classification, Tour de Serbie
3rd Overall Giro del Friuli-Venezia Giulia
2021
3rd Prueba Villafranca de Ordizia
4th Overall Okolo Slovenska
5th Road race, National Road Championships
7th Overall Vuelta Asturias
2022 (1 pro win)
1st Stage 2 Route d'Occitanie
5th Road race, National Road Championships
9th Mont Ventoux Dénivelé Challenge
2023
3rd Classic Grand Besançon Doubs
5th GP Miguel Induráin
5th Trofeo Andratx–Mirador D'es Colomer
6th Overall Vuelta a Asturias
6th Tour du Doubs
7th Muscat Classic
8th Overall Arctic Race of Norway
8th Prueba Villafranca de Ordizia
2024 (1)
1st Grand Prix de Wallonie
3rd Coppa Bernocchi
3rd Grand Prix of Aargau Canton
5th Eschborn–Frankfurt
5th Super 8 Classic
6th Giro dell'Emilia
2025 (1)
1st Stage 1 Vuelta a Burgos
3rd Road race, National Road Championships
4th Grand Prix de Wallonie
10th Strade Bianche
10th Trofeo Calvià
2026
4th GP Industria & Artigianato di Larciano
7th Grand Prix de Wallonie
7th Giro del Veneto

=== Grand Tour general classification results timeline ===
Grand Tour	2022	2023	2024
Giro d'Italia	—	—	—
Tour de France	—	—	—
Vuelta a España	DNF	—	43

Legend
—	Did not compete
DNF	Did not finish
