= Simone Asselborn-Bintz =

Luxembourgish educator and politician

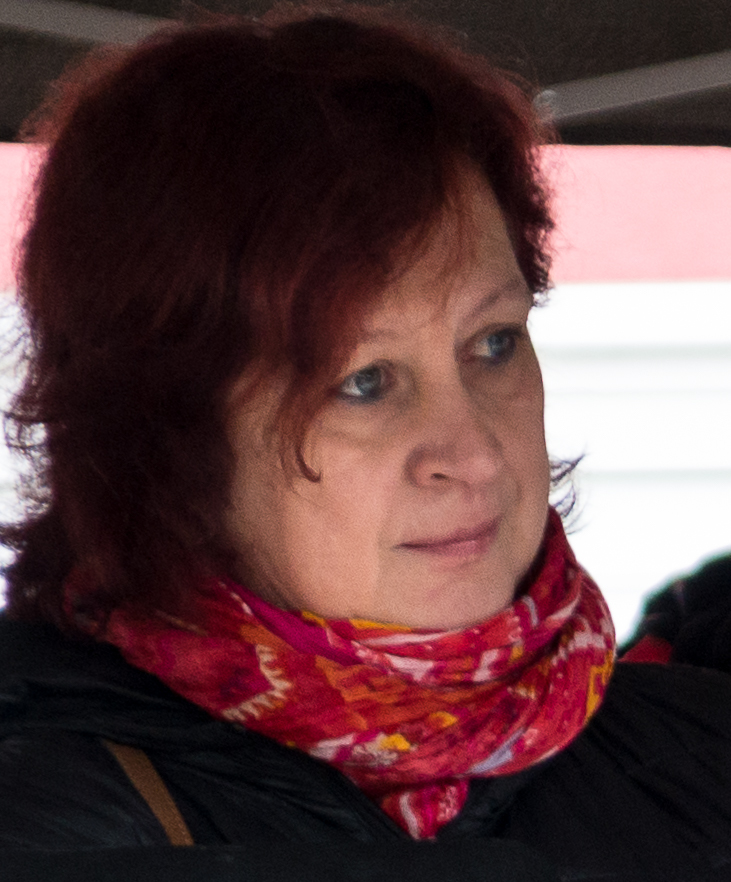

Member of the Chamber of Deputies of Luxembourg
- In office 21 January 2020 – 24 October 2023
- Preceded by: Alex Bodry
- Constituency: Sud
- In office 17 April 2018 – 30 October 2018
- Preceded by: Roger Negri
- Constituency: Sud

Personal details
- Born: Simone Bintz; 24 January 1966 (age 60) Esch-sur-Alzette
- Party: Luxembourg Socialist Workers' Party
- Education: Lycée Hubert Clément
- Occupation: Educator

Simone Asselborn-Bintz (born 24 January 1966 in Esch-sur-Alzette) is a Luxembourgish educator and politician affiliated with the Luxembourg Socialist Workers' Party. She sat in the Chamber of Deputies in 2018 and from 2020 to 2023.

== Biography ==
Simone Bintz is the daughter of Aly Bintz and Micky Erpelding.

Asselborn-Bintz joined the Luxembourg Socialist Workers' Party in 2002. She was elected to the Sanem communal council in 2005, then became an échevine of Sanem in 2011 and was re-elected in 2017.

From 17 April 2018 to 30 October 2018 Asselborn-Bintz replaced Roger Negri as a deputy of the Sud constituency. She was a member of the Public Accounts, National Education, Children and Youth and Environment Committees of the Chamber of Deputies.
