= Belvaux =

Town in the commune of Sanem in Luxembourg

Coordinates: 49°31′N 5°56′E

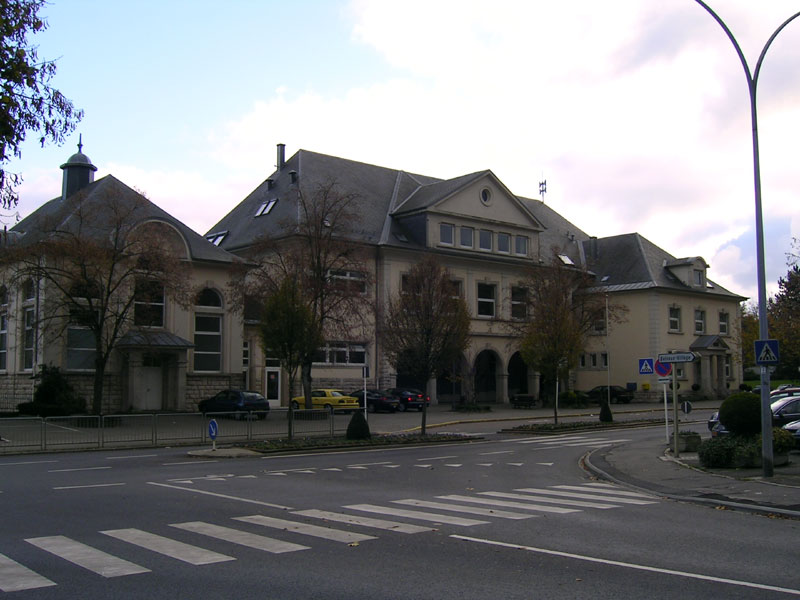
Bieles Primary School in 2004

Belvaux (French pronunciation: [bɛlvo]; Luxembourgish: Bieles [ˈbi̯ələs]; German: Beles [ˈbeːləs]) is a town in the commune of Sanem, in south-western Luxembourg. As of September 2026, the town has a population of 9,419. It lies close to the town of Belval.
