= 2025 Tour de Suisse =

Swiss cycling race

2025 UCI World Tour, race 24 of 36

Race details
- Dates: 15–22 June 2025
- Stages: 8
- Distance: 1,283 km (797 mi)
- Winning time: 29h 29' 01"

Results
Jersey awarded to the overall winner	Winner	João Almeida (POR)	(UAE Team Emirates XRG)
	Second	Kévin Vauquelin (FRA)	(Arkéa–B&B Hotels)
	Third	Oscar Onley (GBR)	(Team Picnic–PostNL)
Jersey awarded to the points classification winner	Points	João Almeida (POR)	(UAE Team Emirates XRG)
Jersey awarded to the mountains classification winner	Mountains	Aleksandr Vlasov	(Red Bull–Bora–Hansgrohe)
Jersey awarded to the young rider classification winner	Young rider	Kévin Vauquelin (FRA)	(Arkéa–B&B Hotels)
	Team	Israel–Premier Tech	

The 2025 Tour de Suisse was a road cycling stage race that took place between 15 and 22 June 2025 in Switzerland. It was the 88th edition of the Tour de Suisse and the 24th event of the 2025 UCI World Tour. The race is took place following the women's edition, with both races sharing a 129.4 km (80.4 mi) stage in Küssnacht.

== Teams ==
All eighteen UCI WorldTeams were joined by four UCI ProTeams to make up the 22 teams that participated in the race.

UCI WorldTeams

- Alpecin–Deceuninck
- Arkéa–B&B Hotels
- Cofidis
- Decathlon–AG2R La Mondiale
- EF Education–EasyPost
- Groupama–FDJ
- INEOS Grenadiers
- Intermarché–Wanty
- Lidl–Trek
- Movistar Team
- Red Bull–Bora–Hansgrohe
- Soudal–Quick-Step
- Team Bahrain Victorious
- Team Picnic–PostNL
- Team Jayco–AlUla
- UAE Team Emirates XRG
- Visma–Lease a Bike
- XDS Astana Team

UCI ProTeams

- Israel–Premier Tech
- Lotto
- Q36.5 Pro Cycling Team
- Tudor Pro Cycling Team

== Route ==
Stage characteristics and winners
Stage	Date	Route	Distance	Type	Winner
1	15 June	Küssnacht to Küssnacht	129.4 km (80.4 mi)	Hilly stage	Romain Grégoire (FRA)
2	16 June	Aarau to Schwarzsee	177 km (110 mi)	Hilly stage	Vincenzo Albanese (ITA)
3	17 June	Aarau to Heiden	195.6 km (121.5 mi)	Hilly stage	Quinn Simmons (USA)
4	18 June	Heiden to Piuro (Italy)	193.2 km (120.0 mi)	Mountain stage	João Almeida (POR)
5	19 June	La Punt to Santa Maria in Calanca	183.8 km (114.2 mi)	Mountain stage	Oscar Onley (GBR)
6	20 June	Chur to Neuhausen am Rheinfall	186.7 km (116.0 mi)	Hilly stage	Jordi Meeus (BEL)
7	21 June	Neuhausen am Rheinfall to Emmetten	207.3 km (128.8 mi)	Mountain stage	João Almeida (POR)
8	22 June	Beckenried to Stockhütte	10 km (6.2 mi)	Mountain time trial	João Almeida (POR)
Total			1,283 km (797 mi)		

== Stages ==
=== Stage 1 ===
15 June 2025 — Küssnacht to Küssnacht, 129.4 km (80.4 mi)

Stage 1 Result
Rank	Rider	Team	Time
1	Romain Grégoire (FRA)	Groupama–FDJ	2h 50' 15"
2	Kévin Vauquelin (FRA)	Arkéa–B&B Hotels	+ 20"
3	Bart Lemmen (NED)	Visma–Lease a Bike	+ 20"
4	Julian Alaphilippe (FRA)	Tudor Pro Cycling Team	+ 20"
5	Ben O'Connor (AUS)	Team Jayco–AlUla	+ 1' 07"
6	Felix Großschartner (AUT)	UAE Team Emirates XRG	+ 1' 07"
7	Pablo Castrillo (ESP)	Movistar Team	+ 1' 07"
8	Lennard Kämna (GER)	Lidl–Trek	+ 1' 07"
9	Rainer Kepplinger (AUT)	Team Bahrain Victorious	+ 1' 07"
10	Nicola Conci (ITA)	XDS Astana Team	+ 1' 26"

General classification after Stage 1
Rank	Rider	Team	Time
1	Romain Grégoire (FRA)	Groupama–FDJ	2h 50' 05"
2	Kévin Vauquelin (FRA)	Arkéa–B&B Hotels	+ 24"
3	Bart Lemmen (NED)	Visma–Lease a Bike	+ 26"
4	Julian Alaphilippe (FRA)	Tudor Pro Cycling Team	+ 26"
5	Ben O'Connor (AUS)	Team Jayco–AlUla	+ 1' 17"
6	Felix Großschartner (AUT)	UAE Team Emirates XRG	+ 1' 17"
7	Pablo Castrillo (ESP)	Movistar Team	+ 1' 17"
8	Lennard Kämna (GER)	Lidl–Trek	+ 1' 17"
9	Rainer Kepplinger (AUT)	Team Bahrain Victorious	+ 1' 17"
10	Ben Swift (GBR)	INEOS Grenadiers	+ 1' 32"

=== Stage 2 ===
16 June 2025 — Aarau to Schwarzsee, 177 km (110 mi)

Stage 2 Result
Rank	Rider	Team	Time
1	Vincenzo Albanese (ITA)	EF Education–EasyPost	3h 55' 57"
2	Fabio Christen (SUI)	Q36.5 Pro Cycling Team	+ 0"
3	Lewis Askey (GBR)	Groupama–FDJ	+ 0"
4	Quinn Simmons (USA)	Lidl–Trek	+ 0"
5	Danny van Poppel (NED)	Red Bull–Bora–Hansgrohe	+ 0"
6	Paul Lapeira (FRA)	Decathlon–AG2R La Mondiale	+ 0"
7	Pello Bilbao (ESP)	Team Bahrain Victorious	+ 0"
8	Nicolò Buratti (ITA)	Team Bahrain Victorious	+ 0"
9	Gal Glivar (SLO)	Alpecin–Deceuninck	+ 0"
10	Fabio Van den Bossche (BEL)	Alpecin–Deceuninck	+ 0"

General classification after Stage 2
Rank	Rider	Team	Time
1	Romain Grégoire (FRA)	Groupama–FDJ	6h 46' 01"
2	Kévin Vauquelin (FRA)	Arkéa–B&B Hotels	+ 25"
3	Bart Lemmen (NED)	Visma–Lease a Bike	+ 27"
4	Julian Alaphilippe (FRA)	Tudor Pro Cycling Team	+ 27"
5	Ben O'Connor (AUS)	Team Jayco–AlUla	+ 1' 18"
6	Felix Großschartner (AUT)	UAE Team Emirates XRG	+ 1' 18"
7	Lennard Kämna (GER)	Lidl–Trek	+ 1' 18"
8	Pablo Castrillo (ESP)	Movistar Team	+ 1' 18"
9	Rainer Kepplinger (AUT)	Team Bahrain Victorious	+ 1' 18"
10	Ben Swift (GBR)	INEOS Grenadiers	+ 1' 33"

=== Stage 3 ===
17 June 2025 — Aarau to Heiden, 195.6 km (121.5 mi)

Stage 3 Result
Rank	Rider	Team	Time
1	Quinn Simmons (USA)	Lidl–Trek	4h 39' 42"
2	João Almeida (POR)	UAE Team Emirates XRG	+ 18"
3	Oscar Onley (GBR)	Team Picnic–PostNL	+ 18"
4	Romain Grégoire (FRA)	Groupama–FDJ	+ 18"
5	Kévin Vauquelin (FRA)	Arkéa–B&B Hotels	+ 18"
6	Jan Christen (SUI)	UAE Team Emirates XRG	+ 18"
7	Fabio Christen (SUI)	Q36.5 Pro Cycling Team	+ 18"
8	Pello Bilbao (ESP)	Team Bahrain Victorious	+ 18"
9	Felix Gall (AUT)	Decathlon–AG2R La Mondiale	+ 18"
10	Clément Champoussin (FRA)	XDS Astana Team	+ 18"

General classification after Stage 3
Rank	Rider	Team	Time
1	Romain Grégoire (FRA)	Groupama–FDJ	11h 26' 01"
2	Kévin Vauquelin (FRA)	Arkéa–B&B Hotels	+ 25"
3	Bart Lemmen (NED)	Visma–Lease a Bike	+ 27"
4	Julian Alaphilippe (FRA)	Tudor Pro Cycling Team	+ 27"
5	Ben O'Connor (AUS)	Team Jayco–AlUla	+ 1' 18"
6	Felix Großschartner (AUT)	UAE Team Emirates XRG	+ 1' 18"
7	Lennard Kämna (GER)	Lidl–Trek	+ 1' 18"
8	Pablo Castrillo (ESP)	Movistar Team	+ 1' 18"
9	Will Barta (USA)	Movistar Team	+ 1' 37"
10	Lorenzo Fortunato (ITA)	XDS Astana Team	+ 1' 37"

=== Stage 4 ===
18 June 2025 — Heiden to Piuro (Italy), 193.2 km (120.0 mi)

Stage 4 Result
Rank	Rider	Team	Time
1	João Almeida (POR)	UAE Team Emirates XRG	4h 10' 19"
2	Oscar Onley (GBR)	Team Picnic–PostNL	+ 40"
3	Ben O'Connor (AUS)	Team Jayco–AlUla	+ 42"
4	Kévin Vauquelin (FRA)	Arkéa–B&B Hotels	+ 1' 00"
5	Romain Grégoire (FRA)	Groupama–FDJ	+ 1' 00"
6	Felix Gall (AUT)	Decathlon–AG2R La Mondiale	+ 1' 00"
7	Ilan Van Wilder (BEL)	Soudal–Quick-Step	+ 1' 02"
8	Clément Champoussin (FRA)	XDS Astana Team	+ 1' 02"
9	Julian Alaphilippe (FRA)	Tudor Pro Cycling Team	+ 1' 02"
10	Lennard Kämna (GER)	Lidl–Trek	+ 1' 02"

General classification after Stage 4
Rank	Rider	Team	Time
1	Romain Grégoire (FRA)	Groupama–FDJ	15h 37' 20"
2	Kévin Vauquelin (FRA)	Arkéa–B&B Hotels	+ 25"
3	Julian Alaphilippe (FRA)	Tudor Pro Cycling Team	+ 29"
4	Ben O'Connor (AUS)	Team Jayco–AlUla	+ 56"
5	Lennard Kämna (GER)	Lidl–Trek	+ 1' 20"
6	Pablo Castrillo (ESP)	Movistar Team	+ 1' 20"
7	João Almeida (POR)	UAE Team Emirates XRG	+ 2' 07"
8	Oscar Onley (GBR)	Team Picnic–PostNL	+ 2' 53"
9	Felix Gall (AUT)	Decathlon–AG2R La Mondiale	+ 3' 23"
10	Clément Champoussin (FRA)	XDS Astana Team	+ 3' 25"

=== Stage 5 ===
19 June 2025 — La Punt to Santa Maria in Calanca, 183.8 km (114.2 mi)

Stage 5 Result
Rank	Rider	Team	Time
1	Oscar Onley (GBR)	Team Picnic–PostNL	4h 33' 28"
2	João Almeida (POR)	UAE Team Emirates XRG	+ 0"
3	Felix Gall (AUT)	Decathlon–AG2R La Mondiale	+ 23"
4	Kévin Vauquelin (FRA)	Arkéa–B&B Hotels	+ 57"
5	Matthew Riccitello (USA)	Israel–Premier Tech	+ 1' 05"
6	Ilan Van Wilder (BEL)	Soudal–Quick-Step	+ 1' 14"
7	Julian Alaphilippe (FRA)	Tudor Pro Cycling Team	+ 1' 22"
8	Lennard Kämna (GER)	Lidl–Trek	+ 1' 46"
9	Felix Großschartner (AUT)	UAE Team Emirates XRG	+ 2' 25"
10	George Bennett (NZL)	Israel–Premier Tech	+ 2' 38"

General classification after Stage 5
Rank	Rider	Team	Time
1	Kévin Vauquelin (FRA)	Arkéa–B&B Hotels	20h 12' 10"
2	Julian Alaphilippe (FRA)	Tudor Pro Cycling Team	+ 29"
3	João Almeida (POR)	UAE Team Emirates XRG	+ 39"
4	Oscar Onley (GBR)	Team Picnic–PostNL	+ 1' 21"
5	Lennard Kämna (GER)	Lidl–Trek	+ 1' 44"
6	Ben O'Connor (AUS)	Team Jayco–AlUla	+ 2' 16"
7	Felix Gall (AUT)	Decathlon–AG2R La Mondiale	+ 2' 20"
8	Pablo Castrillo (ESP)	Movistar Team	+ 2' 40"
9	Matthew Riccitello (USA)	Israel–Premier Tech	+ 3' 08"
10	Ilan Van Wilder (BEL)	Soudal–Quick-Step	+ 3' 17"

=== Stage 6 ===
20 June 2025 — Chur to Neuhausen am Rheinfall, 186.7 km (116.0 mi)

Stage 6 Result
Rank	Rider	Team	Time
1	Jordi Meeus (BEL)	Red Bull–Bora–Hansgrohe	4h 10' 24"
2	Davide Ballerini (ITA)	XDS Astana Team	+ 0"
3	Lewis Askey (GBR)	Groupama–FDJ	+ 0"
4	Madis Mihkels (EST)	EF Education–EasyPost	+ 0"
5	Nicolò Buratti (ITA)	Team Bahrain Victorious	+ 0"
6	Danny van Poppel (NED)	Red Bull–Bora–Hansgrohe	+ 0"
7	Pavel Bittner (CZE)	Team Picnic–PostNL	+ 0"
8	Paul Lapeira (FRA)	Decathlon–AG2R La Mondiale	+ 0"
9	Marius Mayrhofer (GER)	Tudor Pro Cycling Team	+ 0"
10	Stefano Oldani (ITA)	Cofidis	+ 0"

General classification after Stage 6
Rank	Rider	Team	Time
1	Kévin Vauquelin (FRA)	Arkéa–B&B Hotels	24h 22' 34"
2	Julian Alaphilippe (FRA)	Tudor Pro Cycling Team	+ 29"
3	João Almeida (POR)	UAE Team Emirates XRG	+ 39"
4	Oscar Onley (GBR)	Team Picnic–PostNL	+ 1' 21"
5	Lennard Kämna (GER)	Lidl–Trek	+ 1' 44"
6	Ben O'Connor (AUS)	Team Jayco–AlUla	+ 2' 16"
7	Felix Gall (AUT)	Decathlon–AG2R La Mondiale	+ 2' 20"
8	Pablo Castrillo (ESP)	Movistar Team	+ 2' 40"
9	Matthew Riccitello (USA)	Israel–Premier Tech	+ 3' 08"
10	Ilan Van Wilder (BEL)	Soudal–Quick-Step	+ 3' 17"

=== Stage 7 ===
21 June 2025 — Neuhausen am Rheinfall to Emmetten, 207.3 km (128.8 mi)

Stage 7 Result
Rank	Rider	Team	Time
1	João Almeida (POR)	UAE Team Emirates XRG	4h 38' 25"
2	Oscar Onley (GBR)	Team Picnic–PostNL	+ 0"
3	Kévin Vauquelin (FRA)	Arkéa–B&B Hotels	+ 0"
4	Felix Gall (AUT)	Decathlon–AG2R La Mondiale	+ 4"
5	Julian Alaphilippe (FRA)	Tudor Pro Cycling Team	+ 8"
6	Felix Großschartner (AUT)	UAE Team Emirates XRG	+ 1' 07"
7	Joseph Blackmore (GBR)	Israel–Premier Tech	+ 1' 07"
8	Ilan Van Wilder (BEL)	Soudal–Quick-Step	+ 1' 07"
9	Clément Champoussin (FRA)	XDS Astana Team	+ 1' 07"
10	Lennard Kämna (GER)	Lidl–Trek	+ 1' 07"

General classification after Stage 7
Rank	Rider	Team	Time
1	Kévin Vauquelin (FRA)	Arkéa–B&B Hotels	29h 00' 55"
2	João Almeida (POR)	UAE Team Emirates XRG	+ 33"
3	Julian Alaphilippe (FRA)	Tudor Pro Cycling Team	+ 41"
4	Oscar Onley (GBR)	Team Picnic–PostNL	+ 1' 19"
5	Felix Gall (AUT)	Decathlon–AG2R La Mondiale	+ 2' 28"
6	Lennard Kämna (GER)	Lidl–Trek	+ 2' 55"
7	Ben O'Connor (AUS)	Team Jayco–AlUla	+ 3' 27"
8	Pablo Castrillo (ESP)	Movistar Team	+ 4' 25"
9	Ilan Van Wilder (BEL)	Soudal–Quick-Step	+ 4' 28"
10	Clément Champoussin (FRA)	XDS Astana Team	+ 6' 05"

=== Stage 8 ===
22 June 2025 — Beckenried to Stockhütte, 10 km (6.2 mi) (ITT)

Stage 8 Result
Rank	Rider	Team	Time
1	João Almeida (POR)	UAE Team Emirates XRG	27' 33"
2	Felix Gall (AUT)	Decathlon–AG2R La Mondiale	+ 25"
3	Oscar Onley (GBR)	Team Picnic–PostNL	+ 1' 12"
4	Kévin Vauquelin (FRA)	Arkéa–B&B Hotels	+ 1' 40"
5	Harry Sweeny (AUS)	EF Education–EasyPost	+ 1' 54"
6	Aleksandr Vlasov	Red Bull–Bora–Hansgrohe	+ 2' 04"
7	Ben O'Connor (AUS)	Team Jayco–AlUla	+ 2' 07"
8	Will Barta (USA)	Movistar Team	+ 2' 13"
9	Finlay Pickering (GBR)	Team Bahrain Victorious	+ 2' 14"
10	Ilan Van Wilder (BEL)	Soudal–Quick-Step	+ 2' 19"

General classification after Stage 8
Rank	Rider	Team	Time
1	João Almeida (POR)	UAE Team Emirates XRG	29h 29' 01"
2	Kévin Vauquelin (FRA)	Arkéa–B&B Hotels	+ 1' 07"
3	Oscar Onley (GBR)	Team Picnic–PostNL	+ 1' 58"
4	Felix Gall (AUT)	Decathlon–AG2R La Mondiale	+ 2' 20"
5	Julian Alaphilippe (FRA)	Tudor Pro Cycling Team	+ 3' 57"
6	Lennard Kämna (GER)	Lidl–Trek	+ 4' 52"
7	Ben O'Connor (AUS)	Team Jayco–AlUla	+ 5' 08"
8	Ilan Van Wilder (BEL)	Soudal–Quick-Step	+ 6' 16"
9	Pablo Castrillo (ESP)	Movistar Team	+ 6' 41"
10	Clément Champoussin (FRA)	XDS Astana Team	+ 8' 30"

== Classification leadership table ==
Classification leadership by stage
Stage	Winner	General classification	Points classification	Mountains classification	Young rider classification	Team classification	Combativity award
1	Romain Grégoire	Romain Grégoire	Romain Grégoire	Felix Engelhardt	Romain Grégoire	Visma–Lease a Bike	Julian Alaphilippe
2	Vincenzo Albanese	Romain Grégoire	Romain Grégoire	Felix Engelhardt	Romain Grégoire	Visma–Lease a Bike	Mauro Schmid
3	Quinn Simmons	Romain Grégoire	Romain Grégoire	Felix Engelhardt	Romain Grégoire	Movistar Team	Quinn Simmons
4	João Almeida	Romain Grégoire	João Almeida	Felix Engelhardt	Romain Grégoire	Israel–Premier Tech	Quinn Simmons
5	Oscar Onley	Kévin Vauquelin	João Almeida	Aleksandr Vlasov	Kévin Vauquelin	Israel–Premier Tech	Pello Bilbao
6	Jordi Meeus	Kévin Vauquelin	João Almeida	Aleksandr Vlasov	Kévin Vauquelin	Israel–Premier Tech	Stefan Küng
7	João Almeida	Kévin Vauquelin	João Almeida	Aleksandr Vlasov	Kévin Vauquelin	Israel–Premier Tech	Quinn Simmons
8	João Almeida	João Almeida	João Almeida	Aleksandr Vlasov	Kévin Vauquelin	Israel–Premier Tech	no award
Final		João Almeida	João Almeida	Aleksandr Vlasov	Kévin Vauquelin	Israel–Premier Tech	Quinn Simmons

== Classification standings ==
Legend
Denotes the leader of the general classification	Denotes the leader of the young rider classification
Denotes the leader of the points classification	Denotes the leader of the team classification
Denotes the leader of the mountains classification	Denotes the winner of the combativity award

=== General classification ===
Final General classification (1–10)
Rank	Rider	Team	Time
1	João Almeida (POR)	UAE Team Emirates XRG	29h 29' 01"
2	Kévin Vauquelin (FRA)	Arkéa–B&B Hotels	+ 1' 07"
3	Oscar Onley (GBR)	Team Picnic–PostNL	+ 1' 58"
4	Felix Gall (AUT)	Decathlon–AG2R La Mondiale	+ 2' 20"
5	Julian Alaphilippe (FRA)	Tudor Pro Cycling Team	+ 3' 57"
6	Lennard Kämna (GER)	Lidl–Trek	+ 4' 52"
7	Ben O'Connor (AUS)	Team Jayco–AlUla	+ 5' 08"
8	Ilan Van Wilder (BEL)	Soudal–Quick-Step	+ 6' 16"
9	Pablo Castrillo (ESP)	Movistar Team	+ 6' 41"
10	Clément Champoussin (FRA)	XDS Astana Team	+ 8' 30"

=== Points classification ===
Final Points classification (1–10)
Rank	Rider	Team	Points
1	João Almeida (POR)	UAE Team Emirates XRG	58
2	Oscar Onley (GBR)	Team Picnic–PostNL	44
3	Kévin Vauquelin (FRA)	Arkéa–B&B Hotels	28
4	Romain Grégoire (FRA)	Groupama–FDJ	22
4	Felix Gall (AUT)	Decathlon–AG2R La Mondiale	10
5	Quinn Simmons (USA)	Lidl–Trek	16
6	Vincenzo Albanese (ITA)	EF Education–EasyPost	12
7	Lewis Askey (GBR)	Groupama–FDJ	12
8	Aleksandr Vlasov	Red Bull–Bora–Hansgrohe	12
10	Ben O'Connor (AUS)	Team Jayco–AlUla	8

=== Mountains classification ===
Final mountains classification (1–10)
Rank	Rider	Team	Points
1	Aleksandr Vlasov	Red Bull–Bora–Hansgrohe	45
2	João Almeida (POR)	UAE Team Emirates XRG	29
3	Mauro Schmid (SUI)	Team Jayco–AlUla	24
4	Oscar Onley (GBR)	Team Picnic–PostNL	23
5	Pello Bilbao (ESP)	Team Bahrain Victorious	23
6	Kévin Vauquelin (FRA)	Arkéa–B&B Hotels	17
7	Felix Engelhardt (GER)	Team Jayco–AlUla	15
8	Quinn Simmons (USA)	Lidl–Trek	13
9	Felix Gall (AUT)	Decathlon–AG2R La Mondiale	13
10	Neilson Powless (USA)	EF Education–EasyPost	12

=== Young rider classification ===
Final young rider classification (1–10)
Rank	Rider	Team	Time
1	Kévin Vauquelin (FRA)	Arkéa–B&B Hotels	29h 30' 08"
2	Oscar Onley (GBR)	Team Picnic–PostNL	+ 51"
3	Ilan Van Wilder (BEL)	Soudal–Quick-Step	+ 5' 09"
4	Pablo Castrillo (ESP)	Movistar Team	+ 5' 34"
5	Finlay Pickering (GBR)	Team Bahrain Victorious	+ 11' 51"
6	Romain Grégoire (FRA)	Groupama–FDJ	+ 15' 34"
7	Joseph Blackmore (GBR)	Israel–Premier Tech	+ 18' 53"
8	Ewen Costiou (FRA)	Arkéa–B&B Hotels	+ 29' 25"
9	Tijmen Graat (NED)	Visma–Lease a Bike	+ 33' 45"
10	Sam Maisonobe (FRA)	Cofidis	+ 39' 13"

=== Team classification ===
Final team classification (1–10)
Rank	Team	Time
1	Israel–Premier Tech	89h 05' 10"
2	(United Arab Emirates) UAE Team Emirates XRG	+ 11' 41"
3	(United States) Lidl–Trek	+ 20' 03"
4	(Spain) Movistar Team	+ 27' 27"
5	(Netherlands) Team Picnic–PostNL	+ 27' 52"
6	(Kazakhstan) XDS Astana Team	+ 48' 39"
7	(Netherlands) Visma–Lease a Bike	+ 50' 36"
8	(France) Decathlon–AG2R La Mondiale	+ 52' 34"
9	Team Bahrain Victorious	+ 58' 20"
10	(Belgium) Soudal–Quick-Step	+ 1h 11' 47"
