= 2023 Tour des Alpes-Maritimes et du Var =

2023 UCI Europe Tour
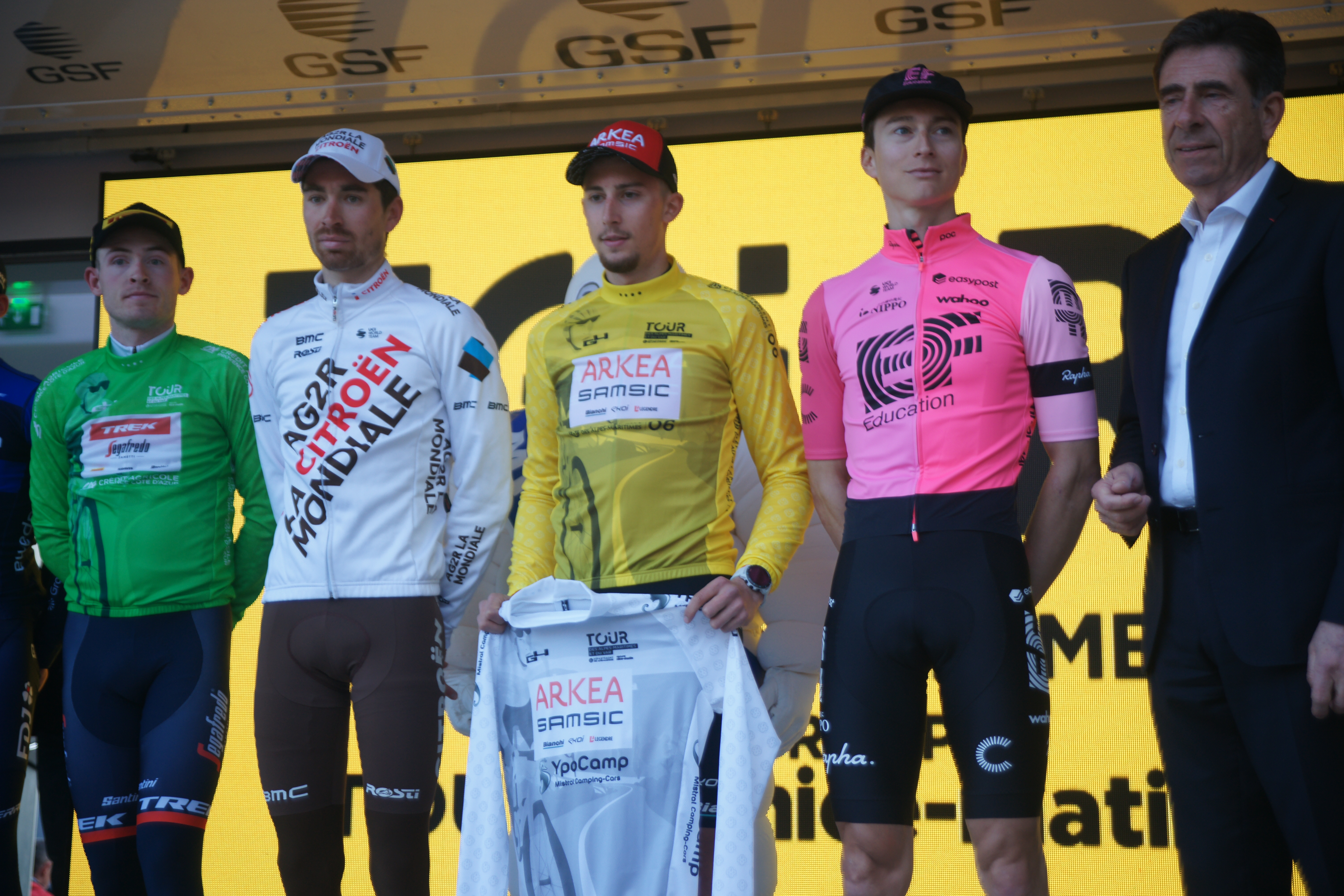
- The final podium of the race

Race details
- Dates: 17–19 February 2023
- Stages: 3
- Distance: 497.24 km (309.0 mi)
- Winning time: 11h 37' 58"

Results
Jersey awarded to the overall winner	Winner	Kévin Vauquelin (FRA)	(Arkéa–Samsic)
	Second	Aurélien Paret-Peintre (FRA)	(AG2R Citroën Team)
	Third	Neilson Powless (USA)	(EF Education–EasyPost)
Jersey awarded to the points classification winner	Points	Mattias Skjelmose Jensen (DEN)	(Trek–Segafredo)
Jersey awarded to the mountains classification winner	Mountains	David Gaudu (FRA)	(Groupama–FDJ)
Jersey awarded to the youth classification winner	Youth	Kévin Vauquelin (FRA)	(Arkéa–Samsic)
	Team	Groupama–FDJ	

The 2023 Tour des Alpes-Maritimes et du Var was a road cycling stage race that took place between 17 and 19 February 2023 in the departments of Alpes-Maritimes and Var in southeastern France. The race is rated as a category 2.1 event on the 2023 UCI Europe Tour calendar, and is the 55th edition of the Tour des Alpes-Maritimes et du Var.

== Teams ==
Seven of the 18 UCI WorldTeams, four UCI ProTeams, and seven UCI Continental teams make up the 18 teams that are participating in the race. Each team entered a full squad of seven riders, for a total of 140 riders who started the race.

UCI WorldTeams

- AG2R Citroën Team
- Arkéa–Samsic
- Cofidis
- EF Education–EasyPost
- Groupama–FDJ
- Team DSM
- Trek–Segafredo

UCI ProTeams

- Bingoal WB
- Q36.5 Pro Cycling Team
- Team TotalEnergies
- Uno-X Pro Cycling Team

UCI Continental Teams

- Astana Qazaqstan Development Team
- Go Sport–Roubaix–Lille Métropole
- Leopard TOGT Pro Cycling
- Lotto–Dstny Development Team
- Nice Métropole Côte d'Azur
- St. Michel–Mavic–Auber93
- CIC U Nantes Atlantique

== Route ==
Stage characteristics and winners
Stage	Date	Course	Distance	Type	Stage winner
1	17 February	Saint-Raphaël to Ramatuelle	187.04 km (116.22 mi)	Hilly stage	Kévin Vauquelin (FRA)
2	18 February	Mandelieu to Azur Arena Antibes	178.9 km (111.2 mi)	Intermediate stage	Mattias Skjelmose (DEN)
3	19 February	Villefranche-sur-Mer to Vence	131.3 km (81.6 mi)	Mountain stage	Aurélien Paret-Peintre (FRA)
Total			497.24 km (308.97 mi)		

== Stages ==
=== Stage 1 ===
17 February 2023 – Saint-Raphaël to Ramatuelle, 187.04 km (116.22 mi)

Stage 1 Result (1–10)
Rank	Rider	Team	Time
1	Kévin Vauquelin (FRA)	Arkéa–Samsic	4h 23' 07"
2	Neilson Powless (USA)	EF Education–EasyPost	+ 5"
3	Kevin Geniets (LUX)	Groupama–FDJ	+ 5"
4	Aurélien Paret-Peintre (FRA)	AG2R Citroën Team	+ 9"
5	Bryan Coquard (FRA)	Cofidis	+ 25"
6	Anthony Turgis (FRA)	Team TotalEnergies	+ 25"
7	Nacer Bouhanni (FRA)	Arkéa–Samsic	+ 25"
8	Anthony Perez (FRA)	Cofidis	+ 25"
9	Marco Tizza (ITA)	Bingoal WB	+ 25"
10	Clément Russo (FRA)	Arkéa–Samsic	+ 25"

General classification after Stage 1 (1–10)
Rank	Rider	Team	Time
1	Kévin Vauquelin (FRA)	Arkéa–Samsic	4h 22' 57"
2	Neilson Powless (USA)	EF Education–EasyPost	+ 9"
3	Kevin Geniets (LUX)	Groupama–FDJ	+ 11"
4	Aurélien Paret-Peintre (FRA)	AG2R Citroën Team	+ 19"
5	Julien Bernard (FRA)	Trek–Segafredo	+ 31"
6	Bryan Coquard (FRA)	Cofidis	+ 35"
7	Anthony Turgis (FRA)	Team TotalEnergies	+ 35"
8	Nacer Bouhanni (FRA)	Arkéa–Samsic	+ 35"
9	Anthony Perez (FRA)	Cofidis	+ 35"
10	Marco Tizza (ITA)	Bingoal WB	+ 35"

=== Stage 2 ===
18 February 2023 – Mandelieu to Azur Arena Antibes, 178.9 km (111.2 mi)

Stage 2 Result (1–10)
Rank	Rider	Team	Time
1	Mattias Skjelmose Jensen (DEN)	Trek–Segafredo	4h 06' 20"
2	Neilson Powless (USA)	EF Education–EasyPost	+ 0"
3	Kévin Vauquelin (FRA)	Arkéa–Samsic	+ 0"
4	Anthony Turgis (FRA)	Team TotalEnergies	+ 0"
5	Benjamin Thomas (FRA)	Cofidis	+ 0"
6	David Gaudu (FRA)	Groupama–FDJ	+ 0"
7	Clément Venturini (FRA)	AG2R Citroën Team	+ 0"
8	Sam Watson (GBR)	Groupama–FDJ	+ 0"
9	Romain Bardet (FRA)	Team DSM	+ 0"
10	Andrea Piccolo (ITA)	EF Education–EasyPost	+ 0"

General classification after Stage 2 (1–10)
Rank	Rider	Team	Time
1	Kévin Vauquelin (FRA)	Arkéa–Samsic	8h 29' 13"
2	Neilson Powless (USA)	EF Education–EasyPost	+ 7"
3	Kevin Geniets (LUX)	Groupama–FDJ	+ 14"
4	Aurélien Paret-Peintre (FRA)	AG2R Citroën Team	+ 23"
5	Mattias Skjelmose Jensen (DEN)	Trek–Segafredo	+ 27"
6	Anthony Turgis (FRA)	Team TotalEnergies	+ 39"
7	Marco Tizza (ITA)	Bingoal WB	+ 39"
8	Romain Bardet (FRA)	Team DSM	+ 39"
9	Andrea Piccolo (ITA)	EF Education–EasyPost	+ 39"
10	Sam Watson (GBR)	Groupama–FDJ	+ 39"

=== Stage 3 ===
19 February 2023 – Villefranche-sur-Mer to Vence, 131.3 km (81.6 mi)

Stage 3 Result (1–10)
Rank	Rider	Team	Time
1	Aurélien Paret-Peintre (FRA)	AG2R Citroën Team	3h 08' 45"
2	Mattias Skjelmose Jensen (DEN)	Trek–Segafredo	+ 5"
3	Kévin Vauquelin (FRA)	Arkéa–Samsic	+ 5"
4	Romain Bardet (FRA)	Team DSM	+ 5"
5	Anthony Perez (FRA)	Cofidis	+ 5"
6	Kevin Geniets (LUX)	Groupama–FDJ	+ 5"
7	Mathias Bregnhøj (DEN)	Leopard TOGT Pro Cycling	+ 5"
8	Torstein Træen (NOR)	Uno-X Pro Cycling Team	+ 5"
9	Neilson Powless (USA)	EF Education–EasyPost	+ 5"
10	Felix Gall (AUT)	AG2R Citroën Team	+ 5"

General classification after Stage 3 (1–10)
Rank	Rider	Team	Time
1	Kévin Vauquelin (FRA)	Arkéa–Samsic	11h 36' 58"
2	Aurélien Paret-Peintre (FRA)	AG2R Citroën Team	+ 7"
3	Neilson Powless (USA)	EF Education–EasyPost	+ 10"
4	Kevin Geniets (LUX)	Groupama–FDJ	+ 19"
5	Mattias Skjelmose Jensen (DEN)	Trek–Segafredo	+ 26"
6	Felix Gall (AUT)	AG2R Citroën Team	+ 42"
7	David Gaudu (FRA)	Groupama–FDJ	+ 43"
8	Romain Bardet (FRA)	Team DSM	+ 44"
9	Anthony Perez (FRA)	Cofidis	+ 44"
10	Torstein Træen (NOR)	Uno-X Pro Cycling Team	+ 44"

== Classification leadership table ==
Classification leadership by stage
Stage	Winner	General classification	Points classification	Mountains classification	Young rider classification	Team classification	Combativity award
1	Kévin Vauquelin	Kévin Vauquelin	Kévin Vauquelin	Julien Bernard	Kévin Vauquelin	Arkéa–Samsic	Maël Guégan
2	Mattias Skjelmose Jensen	Kévin Vauquelin	Mattias Skjelmose Jensen	Mathieu Burgaudeau	Kévin Vauquelin	Groupama–FDJ	
3	Aurélien Paret-Peintre	Kévin Vauquelin	Mattias Skjelmose Jensen	David Gaudu	Kévin Vauquelin	Groupama–FDJ	
Final		Kévin Vauquelin	Mattias Skjelmose Jensen	David Gaudu	Kévin Vauquelin	Groupama–FDJ	

== Current classification standings ==
Legend
Denotes the leader of the general classification	Denotes the leader of the mountains classification
Denotes the leader of the points classification	Denotes the leader of the young rider classification

=== General classification ===
Final general classification (1–10)
Rank	Rider	Team	Time
1	Kévin Vauquelin (FRA)	Arkéa–Samsic	11h 36' 58"
2	Aurélien Paret-Peintre (FRA)	AG2R Citroën Team	+ 7"
3	Neilson Powless (USA)	EF Education–EasyPost	+ 10"
4	Kevin Geniets (LUX)	Groupama–FDJ	+ 19"
5	Mattias Skjelmose Jensen (DEN)	Trek–Segafredo	+ 26"
6	Felix Gall (AUT)	AG2R Citroën Team	+ 42"
7	David Gaudu (FRA)	Groupama–FDJ	+ 43"
8	Romain Bardet (FRA)	Team DSM	+ 44"
9	Anthony Perez (FRA)	Cofidis	+ 44"
10	Torstein Træen (NOR)	Uno-X Pro Cycling Team	+ 44"

=== Points classification ===
Final points classification (1–10)
Rank	Rider	Team	Points
1	Mattias Skjelmose Jensen (DEN)	Trek–Segafredo	30
2	Aurélien Paret-Peintre (FRA)	AG2R Citroën Team	24
3	Kévin Vauquelin (FRA)	Arkéa–Samsic	24
4	Neilson Powless (USA)	EF Education–EasyPost	22
5	Jean-Louis Le Ny (FRA)	Nice Métropole Côte d'Azur	10
6	Julien Bernard (FRA)	Trek–Segafredo	8
7	Bryan Coquard (FRA)	Cofidis	6
8	Kevin Geniets (LUX)	Groupama–FDJ	6
9	Mads Østergaard Kristensen (DEN)	Leopard TOGT Pro Cycling	6
10	Felix Gall (AUT)	AG2R Citroën Team	4

=== Mountains classification ===
Final mountains classification (1–10)
Rank	Rider	Team	Points
1	David Gaudu (FRA)	Groupama–FDJ	34
2	Romain Bardet (FRA)	Team DSM	18
3	Romain Grégoire (FRA)	Groupama–FDJ	16
4	Aurélien Paret-Peintre (FRA)	AG2R Citroën Team	16
5	Mathieu Burgaudeau (FRA)	Team TotalEnergies	12
6	Marco Brenner (GER)	Team DSM	12
7	Julien Bernard (FRA)	Trek–Segafredo	10
8	Hugh Carthy (GBR)	EF Education–EasyPost	10
9	Alexander Cepeda (ECU)	EF Education–EasyPost	10
10	Victor Lafay (FRA)	Cofidis	8

=== Young rider classification ===
Final young rider classification (1–10)
Rank	Rider	Team	Time
1	Kévin Vauquelin (FRA)	Arkéa–Samsic	11h 37' 58"
2	Mattias Skjelmose Jensen (DEN)	Trek–Segafredo	+ 26"
3	Romain Grégoire (FRA)	Groupama–FDJ	+ 1' 29"
4	Lennert Van Eetvelt (BEL)	Lotto–Dstny	+ 1' 29"
5	Thomas Gachignard (FRA)	St. Michel–Mavic–Auber93	+ 1' 38"
6	Max Poole (GBR)	Team DSM	+ 8' 30"
7	Jordan Jegat (FRA)	CIC U Nantes Atlantique	+ 10' 00"
8	Harold Martín López (ECU)	Astana Qazaqstan Team	+ 10' 00"
9	Bastien Tronchon (FRA)	AG2R Citroën Team	+ 11' 41"
10	Martin Urianstad (NOR)	Uno-X Pro Cycling Team	+ 12' 24"

=== Team classification ===
Final team classification (1–10)
Rank	Team	Time
1	Groupama–FDJ	34h 55' 49"
2	AG2R Citroën Team	+ 50"
3	Trek–Segafredo	+ 2' 55"
4	EF Education–EasyPost	+ 7' 25"
5	Cofidis	+ 9' 29"
6	Uno-X Pro Cycling Team	+ 13' 30"
7	Arkéa–Samsic	+ 14' 57"
8	Team DSM	+ 16' 51"
9	Team TotalEnergies	+ 19' 20"
10	Bingoal WB	+ 19' 34"
