= Felix Gall =

Austrian cyclist (born 1998)

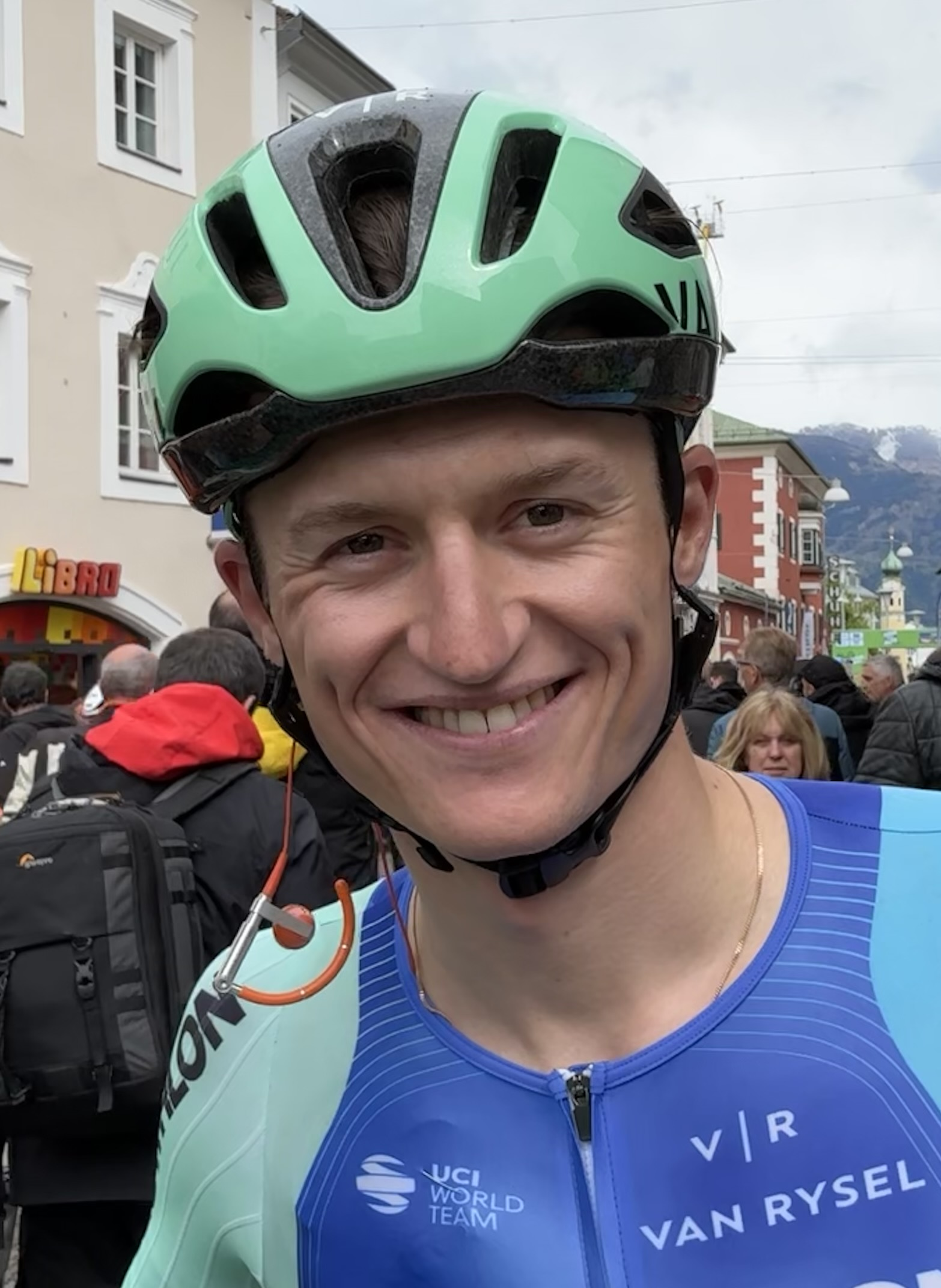
- Gall at the 2025 Tour of the Alps

Personal information
- Born: 27 February 1998 (age 28) Nußdorf-Debant, Tyrol, Austria
- Height: 1.78 m (5 ft 10 in)
- Weight: 66 kg (146 lb)

Cycling career
- Sport: Cycling
- Current team: Decathlon CMA CGM Team
- Discipline: Road
- Role: Climber

Amateur team
- 2012–2016: RC ARBÖ Tom Tailor RBK Wörgl

Professional teams
- 2017–2019: Development Team Sunweb
- 2020–2021: Team Sunweb
- 2022–: AG2R Citroën Team

Major wins
- Grand Tours Tour de France 1 individual stage (2023) Stage races Vuelta a Burgos (2026)
Medal record
Representing Austria
World Championships
Gold medal – first place	2015 Richmond	Junior road race

Felix Gall (born 27 February 1998) is an Austrian professional cyclist who rides for the UCI WorldTeam Decathlon CMA CGM Team. Gall is regarded as one of Austria's best cyclists ever and achieved international prominence after winning Stage 17 of the 2023 Tour de France, finishing fifth overall in the 2025 Tour de France and finishing 2nd overall at the 2026 Giro d'Italia. In this year he was the only one who achieved two podium finishes in the general classifications of the Grand Tours.

== Career ==
=== Junior career ===
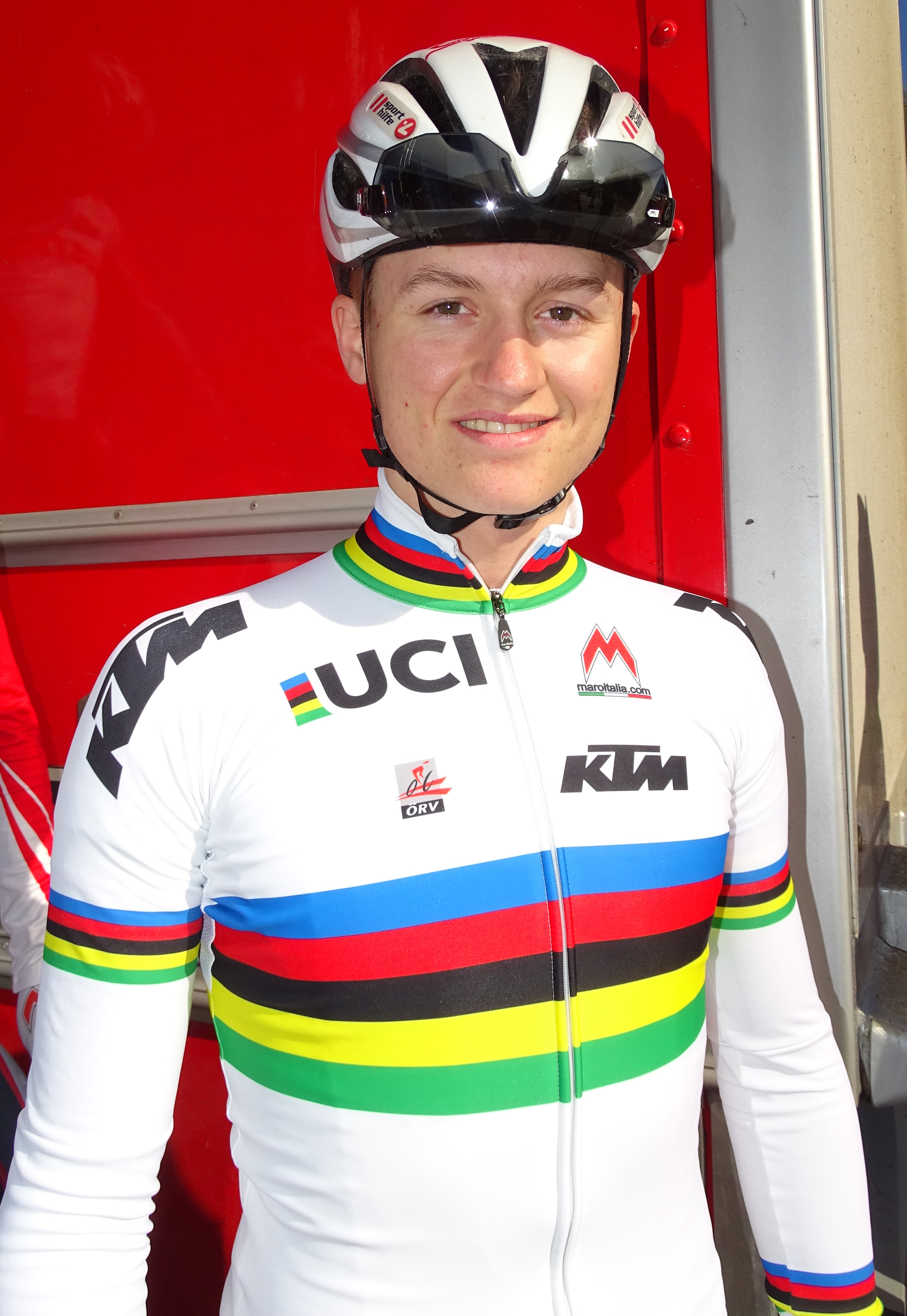
Gall in 2016

Gall was born in Nußdorf-Debant, Tyrol, Austria. During his childhood, he practiced several sports including climbing, tennis, skiing, and taekwondo before becoming interested in cycling through school friends involved in triathlon.

In 2015, Gall won the Austrian National Junior Road Race Championships. Later that year, he achieved international recognition by winning the junior road race at the 2015 UCI Road World Championships in Richmond, Virginia. Following his victory, he received a public welcome in his hometown attended by around 1,000 people and was awarded a cycling scholarship, a driving course, and a new racing bicycle.

In 2016, Gall won the junior Trofeo Dorigo Porte. The following season, he joined the Development Team Sunweb. In 2018, he won the Austrian National Under 23 Road Race Championships. In 2019, he claimed his first elite stage race victory by winning both Stage 2 and the overall classification of the Istrian Spring Trophy.

Gall progressed through the development structure of Team Sunweb and later joined the WorldTour squad. During his time with the team, he developed into a promising climber and stage racer. In 2021, after two seasons with the WorldTour team, he announced that he would leave Team DSM to join the AG2R Citroën Team for the 2022 season. Although his contract with DSM was initially due to run through 2022, Gall and the team agreed to terminate it early amid reported tensions between several riders and team management.

==== 2022 ====
In his first season with the AG2R Citroën Team, Gall finished sixth overall at the Tour of the Alps. He was subsequently selected for the 2022 Giro d'Italia, marking his debut appearance in a Grand Tour.

==== 2023 ====
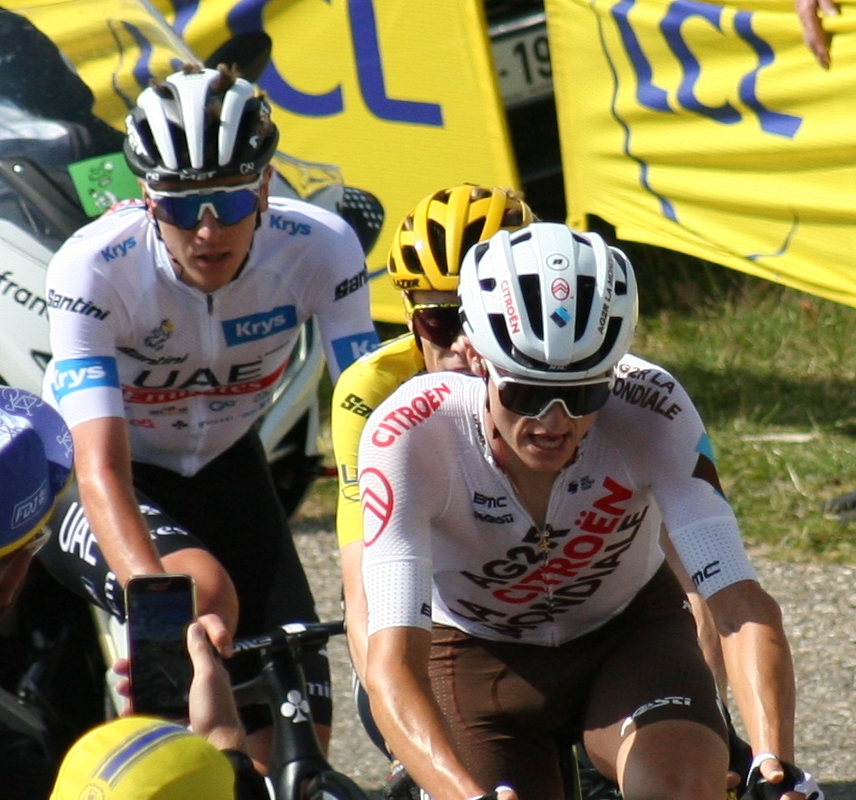
Gall (right) riding with Jonas Vingegaard and Tadej Pogačar at the 2023 Tour de France

Gall made a significant breakthrough during the 2023 season. Early results included sixth place at the Ardèche Classic, 16th overall at Tirreno–Adriatico, ninth at GP Miguel Induráin, and tenth overall at the Tour of the Basque Country, where he recorded four top 10 stage finishes. He also finished second on the opening stage of the Tour of the Alpes before crashing later in the race, and later took second place at the Mercan'Tour Classic.

At the 2023 Tour de Suisse, Gall secured his first professional victory by winning Stage 4. He also finished second on Stage 3, eighth overall in the general classification, and fourth in the mountains classification.

Gall was selected for his first 2023 Tour de France in 2023. During Stage 5, he joined the breakaway and became to wear the polka dot jersey after taking the lead in the mountains classification by cresting the Col du Soudet first. On 17 July 2023, Gall achieved the biggest victory of his career by winning Stage 17 of the Tour de France, the race's Queen Stage, after a solo attack in the Alps. He ultimately finished eighth overall and third in the young rider classification among riders under 25.

==== 2024 ====
Gall rode the 2024 Tour de France and finished 14th overall. Later that season, he competed in the 2024 Vuelta a España, primarily working in support of teammate Ben O'Connor, who finished second overall. Gall remained inside the top 10 of the general classification through Stage 14 before losing time in the final mountain stages and eventually finishing 29th overall.

==== 2025 ====
In 2025, Gall entered the 2025 Tour de France as team leader for the Decathlon AG2R La Mondiale Team. He prepared for the race with an altitude training camp and a fourth place overall finish at the Tour de Suisse.

Gall moved into the top 10 of the Tour de France general classification on Stage 12 and climbed to sixth overall after Stage 18. On Stage 19, strong teamwork from Decathlon AG2R La Mondiale helped Gall overtake Primož Roglič in the standings after Roglič's unsuccessful attack earlier in the stage. Gall ultimately finished fifth overall, the best Grand Tour result of his career and achieved the best result by an Austrian rider since Peter Luttenberger in 1996. He later also finished eighth overall at the 2025 Vuelta a España, securing another top 10 Grand Tour result.

==== 2026 ====
Gall earned his first Grand Tour podium at the 2026 Giro d'Italia; despite struggling on the race's sole time trial, he was consistently the strongest climber behind eventual winner Jonas Vingegaard and finished in second place.

== Major results ==
2015
1st Road race, UCI Junior Road World Championships
National Junior Road Championships

1st Road race
2nd Time trial

4th Time trial, UEC European Junior Road Championships
4th Overall Oberösterreich Juniorenrundfahrt
8th Overall GP Général Patton
2016
1st Trofeo Guido Dorigo
3rd Overall Tour du Pays de Vaud
6th G.P. Sportivi Sovilla
9th Overall Course de la Paix Juniors
2018
1st Road race, National Under-23 Road Championships
4th Overall Tour de Savoie Mont Blanc

1st Young rider classification

6th Overall Grand Prix Priessnitz spa
2019
1st Overall Istrian Spring Trophy

1st Stage 2

9th Overall Circuit des Ardennes
2022
5th Trofeo Pollença–Port d'Andratx
6th Overall Tour of the Alps
10th Trofeo Serra de Tramuntana
2023 (2 pro wins)
2nd Mercan'Tour Classic
6th Overall Tour des Alpes-Maritimes et du Var
6th Ardèche Classic
8th Overall Tour de France

1st Stage 17
Held after Stage 5
Combativity award Stage 17

8th Overall Tour de Suisse

1st Stage 4

9th Overall Tour of the Alps
9th GP Miguel Induráin
10th Overall Tour of the Basque Country
2024
4th Ardèche Classic
4th Tour du Jura
5th Classic Grand Besançon Doubs
9th Overall Paris–Nice
10th Overall Tour de Suisse
2025
4th Overall Tour de Suisse
5th Overall Tour de France
5th Overall Tour of the Alps
8th Overall Vuelta a España
2026 (2)
1st Overall Vuelta a Burgos

1st Stage 3

2nd Overall Giro d'Italia
3rd Overall Vuelta a España
5th Overall UAE Tour
6th Overall Volta a Catalunya

=== General classification results timeline ===
Grand Tour general classification results
Grand Tour	2021	2022	2023	2024	2025	2026
Giro d'Italia	—	50	—	—	—	2
Tour de France	—	—	8	14	5	—
Vuelta a España	—	—	—	29	8	3
Major stage race general classification results
Race	2021	2022	2023	2024	2025	2026
Paris–Nice	—	—	—	9	18	—
Tirreno–Adriatico	—	—	16	—	—	—
Volta a Catalunya	—	—	—	—	DNF	6
Tour of the Basque Country	85	12	10	DNF	—	—
Tour de Romandie	32	—	—	—	—	—
Critérium du Dauphiné	22	—	—	—	—	—
Tour de Suisse	—	—	8	10	4	—

Legend
—	Did not compete
DNF	Did not finish
IP	Race in Progress
