= Paul Lapeira =

French bicycle racer

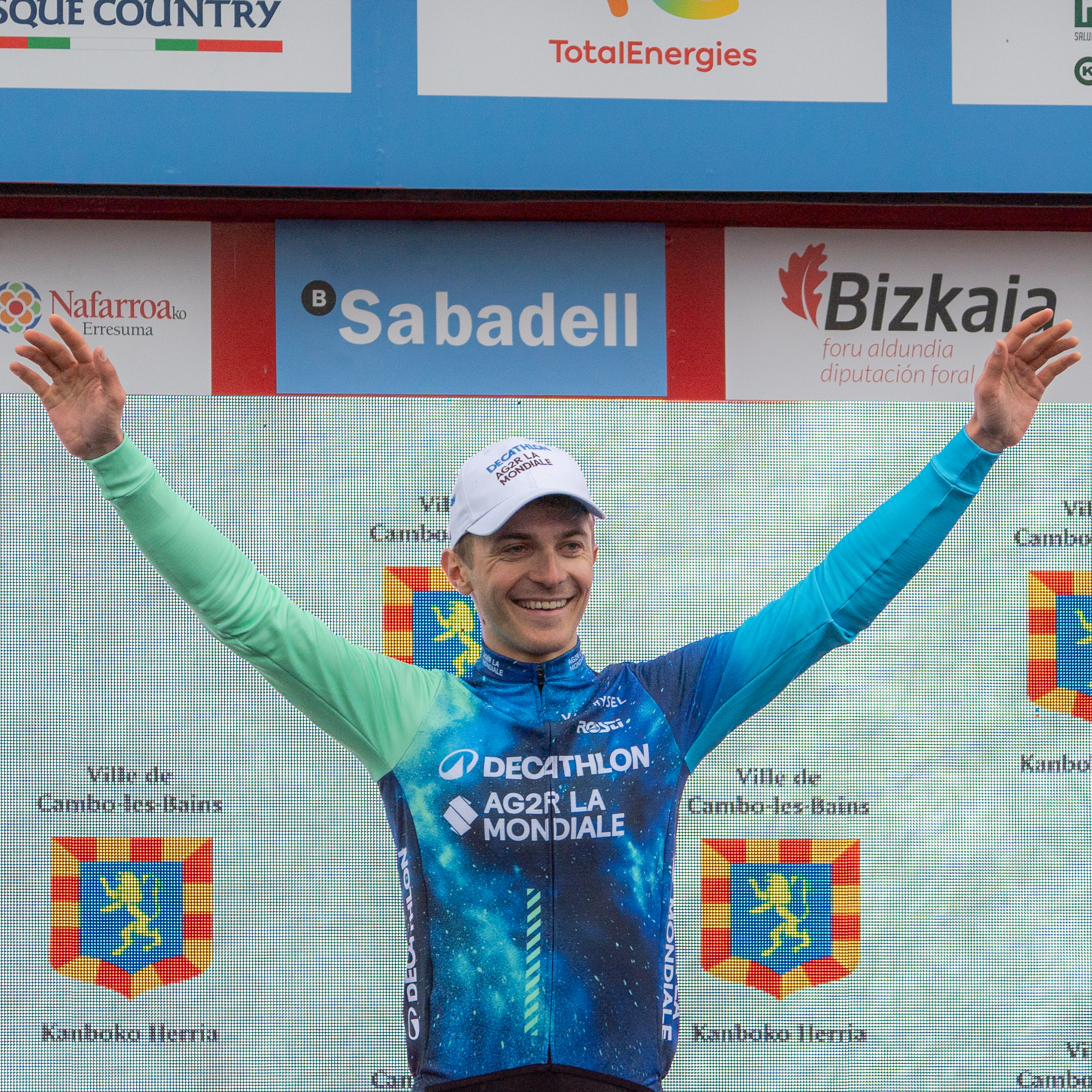
- Lapeira in 2024

Personal information
- Born: 28 May 2000 (age 26) Fougères, France
- Height: 1.76 m (5 ft 9 in)
- Weight: 64 kg (141 lb)

Cycling career
- Sport: Cycling
- Current team: Decathlon CMA CGM Team
- Discipline: Road
- Role: Rider

Amateur teams
- 2007–2018: VC Saint-Hilaire-du-Harcouët
- 2019–2021: Chambéry CF

Professional teams
- 2021: AG2R Citroën Team (stagiaire)
- 2022–: AG2R Citroën Team

Major wins
- One-day races and Classics National Road Race Championships (2024) Coppa Agostoni (2026)

Paul Lapeira (born 28 May 2000) is a French cyclist, who currently rides for UCI WorldTeam Decathlon CMA CGM Team.

== Major results ==
2018
1st Stage 2a (TTT) Aubel–Thimister–Stavelot
2nd Overall Tour des Portes du Pays d'Othe

1st Stage 2 (TTT)

2019
1st Stage 1 (TTT) Giro della Regione Friuli Venezia Giulia
2021
1st Il Piccolo Lombardia
1st Trofeo Città di San Vendemiano
10th Overall L'Etoile d'Or
2022
4th Classic Loire Atlantique
2023
4th Polynormande
10th Grand Prix de Denain
Giro d'Italia

Held after Stage 2
Combativity award Stage 2

2024 (5 pro wins)
1st Road race, National Road Championships
1st Classic Loire Atlantique
1st Cholet-Pays de la Loire
1st Polynormande
1st Stage 2 Tour of the Basque Country
3rd Coppa Agostoni
5th Amstel Gold Race
7th La Drôme Classic
9th Trofeo Laigueglia
2025 (2)
1st Stage 2 Tour de Pologne
1st Stage 3 Tour du Limousin
2nd Classic Var
4th Overall Boucles de la Mayenne
4th Overall Tour du Limousin
4th Tre Valli Varesine
4th Paris–Tours
4th Coppa Agostoni
9th Polynormande
10th Grand Prix de Wallonie
2026 (2)
1st Coppa Agostoni
1st Tour des Alpes-Maritimes
2nd Overall Étoile de Bessèges
2nd Road race, National Road Championships
5th Grand Prix de Wallonie
5th La Drôme Classic
6th Bretagne Classic
6th Paris–Tours
7th Grand Prix Cycliste de Québec

=== Grand Tour general classification results timeline ===
Grand Tour	2023	2024
Giro d'Italia	DNF	—
Tour de France	—	88
Vuelta a España	109	—
