= Kévin Vauquelin =

French cyclist (born 2001)

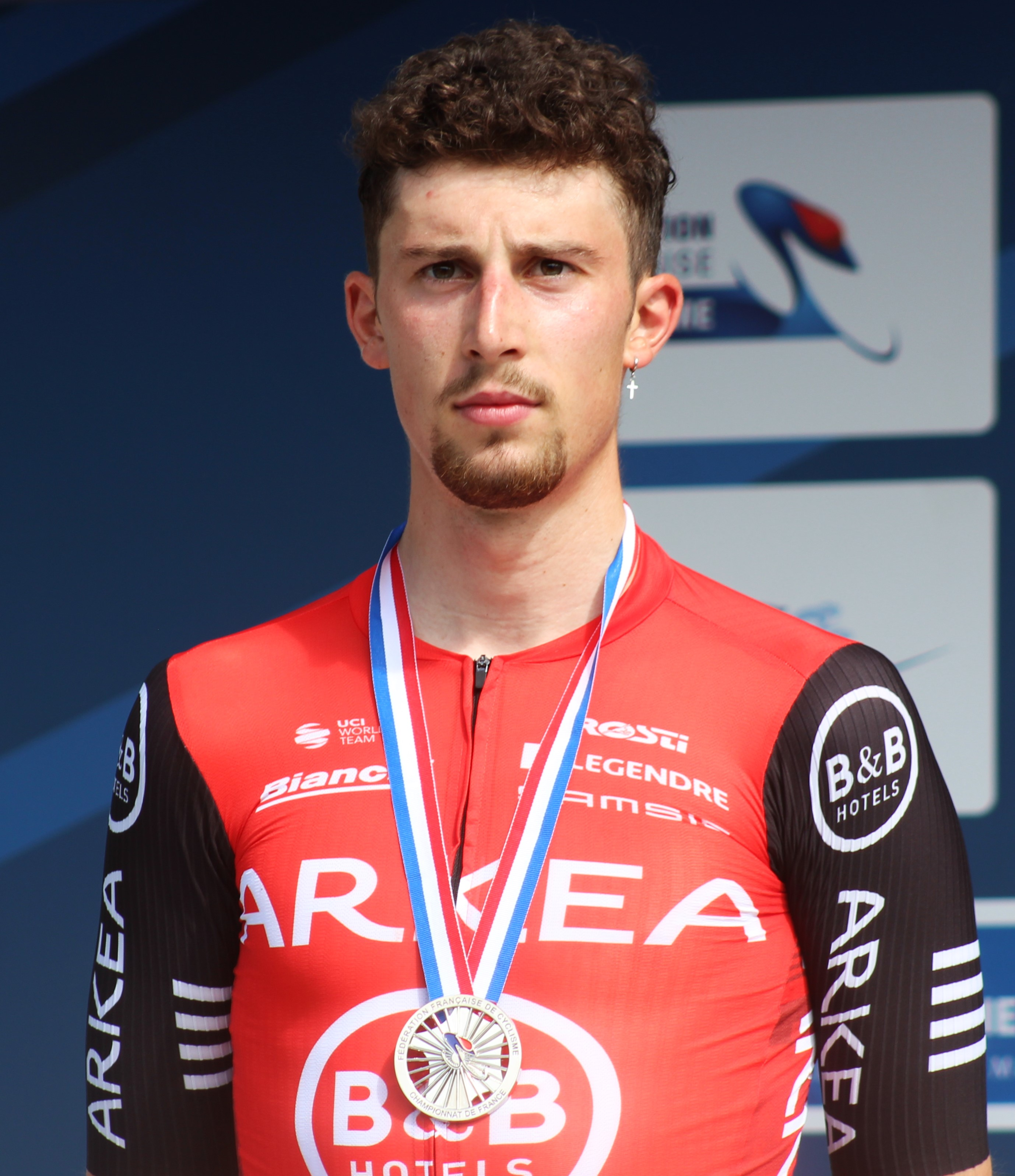
- Vauquelin in 2025

Personal information
- Born: 26 April 2001 (age 25) Bayeux, France
- Height: 1.76 m (5 ft 9 in)
- Weight: 69 kg (152 lb)

Cycling career
- Sport: Cycling
- Current team: Netcompany–Ineos
- Disciplines: Road; Track
- Role: Rider
- Rider type: Puncheur; Time trialist

Amateur teams
- 2020–2021: VC Rouen 76
- 2020: Arkéa–Samsic (stagiaire)
- 2021: Arkéa–Samsic (stagiaire)

Professional teams
- 2022–2025: Arkéa–Samsic
- 2026–: Netcompany INEOS

Major wins
- Grand Tours Tour de France 1 individual stage (2024)
Medal record
Men's track cycling
Representing France
UCI Junior Track World Championships
Silver medal – second place	2018 Aigle	Team pursuit
Silver medal – second place	2019 Frankfurt	Points race
Silver medal – second place	2019 Frankfurt	Team pursuit
Bronze medal – third place	2019 Frankfurt	Madison

Kévin Vauquelin (born 26 April 2001) is a French professional racing cyclist who rides for UCI WorldTeam Netcompany–Ineos. Professional since 2022, Vauquelin has most notably won a stage of the 2024 Tour de France.

== Career ==
=== Arkéa ===
His first professional win was a stage of and the overall title of the 2023 Tour des Alpes-Maritimes et du Var.

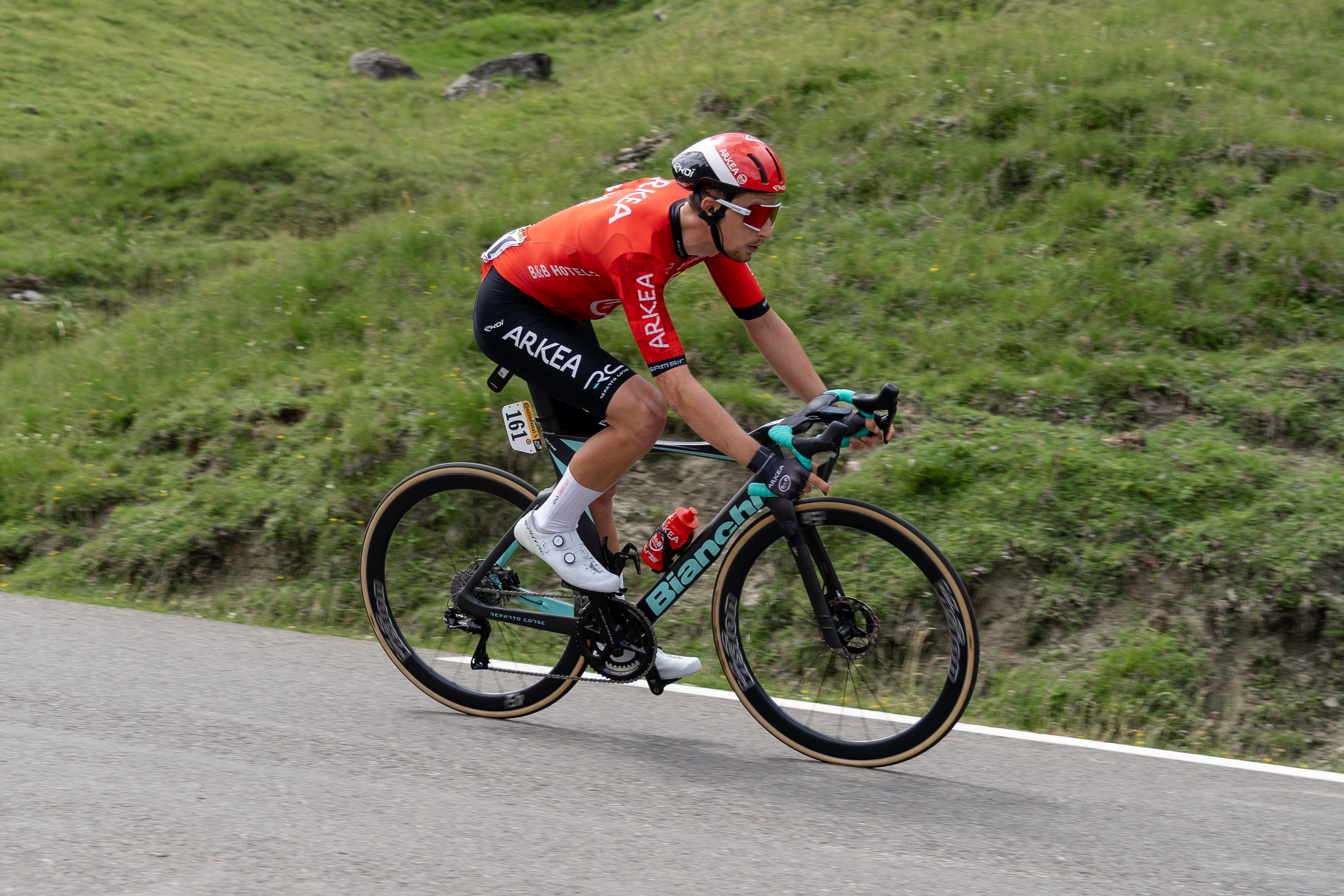
Vauquelin at the 2024 Tour de France

In February 2024, he won the stage five time trial and finished second overall in the Étoile de Bessèges. Two months later, he placed second to Stephen Williams at the La Flèche Wallonne. In late June, Vauquelin took his biggest success to date, winning stage two of the Tour de France via a solo win from the breakaway. This also marked Arkéa–B&B Hotels's first ever stage win in the race.

Vauquelin took part in the 2025 Tour de Suisse, taking the overall race lead on Stage 5 and holding onto the lead until the final stage, when he was overtaken by João Almeida to finish second overall. In the 2025 Tour de France, Vauquelin took the white jersey after Stage 2. In the Time Trial on Stage 5, he lost the jersey to Remco Evenepoel but moved into third position overall as a result of finishing ahead of Jonas Vingegaard and Matteo Jorgenson. He lost time on Stage 10, falling to sixth in the General Classification, and finished the Tour in seventh place overall.

=== Ineos Grenadiers ===
In October 2025 INEOS Grenadiers announced that Vauquelin would join them from the 2026 season.

== Major results ==
=== Road ===
2018
1st Time trial, National Junior Championships
4th Chrono des Nations Juniors
4th Classique des Alpes Juniors
2019
National Junior Championships

1st Road race
3rd Time trial

6th Overall Grand Prix Rüebliland
6th Classique des Alpes Juniors
2020
2nd Trio Normand
National Under-23 Championships

3rd Time trial
4th Road race

2021
1st Time trial, National Under-23 Championships
2nd Overall Etoile d'Or
3rd Annemasse-Bellegarde et retour
9th Overall Tour d'Eure-et-Loir
2022
1st Young rider classification, Tour of Belgium
2nd Overall Tour de Luxembourg
2nd Overall Tour Poitou-Charentes en Nouvelle-Aquitaine

1st Young rider classification

4th Route Adélie
6th Overall Tour of Oman
6th Overall Arctic Race of Norway
7th Time trial, UEC European Championships
7th Overall Vuelta a Asturias
7th Ronde van Drenthe
2023 (3 pro wins)
1st Overall Tour des Alpes-Maritimes et du Var

1st Young rider classification
1st Stage 1

1st Tour du Jura
2nd Route Adélie de Vitré
4th Overall Étoile de Bessèges
5th Overall Tour du Limousin
6th Overall Région Pays de la Loire Tour
9th Tour du Doubs
2024 (2)
1st Stage 2 Tour de France
2nd Time trial, National Championships
2nd Overall Étoile de Bessèges

1st Young rider classification
1st Stage 5 (ITT)

2nd La Flèche Wallonne
3rd Grand Prix La Marseillaise
8th Overall Tour of the Basque Country
10th Overall Tirreno–Adriatico
2025 (5)
1st Overall Étoile de Bessèges

1st Points classification
1st Stages 4 & 5 (ITT)

1st Overall Région Pays de la Loire Tour

1st Stage 4

National Championships

2nd Time trial
3rd Road race

2nd Overall Tour de Suisse

1st Young rider classification

2nd La Flèche Wallonne
2nd Grand Prix du Morbihan
4th Classic Var
7th Overall Tour de France

Held after Stages 2–4

10th Tro-Bro Léon
2026 (2)
1st Overall Giro d'Abruzzo

1st Young rider classification
1st Stage 4

4th Overall Paris–Nice

1st Stage 3 (TTT)

5th Overall Volta ao Algarve
10th Overall Tour of the Basque Country

==== General classification results timeline ====
Grand Tour general classification results
Grand Tour	2023	2024	2025	2026
Giro d'Italia	—	—	—	—
Tour de France	—	91	7	36
Vuelta a España	DNF	—	—	
Major stage race general classification results
Race	2023	2024	2025	2026
Paris–Nice	18	—	—	4
Tirreno–Adriatico	—	10	12	—
Volta a Catalunya	—	—	—	
Tour of the Basque Country	—	8	—	10
Tour de Romandie	DNF	—	—	
Critérium du Dauphiné	—	—	—	15
Tour de Suisse	—	42	2	

Legend
—	Did not compete
DNF	Did not finish

=== Track ===
2018
2nd Team pursuit, UCI World Junior Championships
2019
UCI World Cup

1st Team pursuit, Milton
3rd Madison, Brisbane (with Morgan Kneisky)

UCI World Junior Championships

2nd Points race
2nd Team pursuit
3rd Madison (with Clément Petit)
