= 2024 Tour of the Basque Country =

Spanish cycling race

2024 UCI World Tour, race 15 of 35
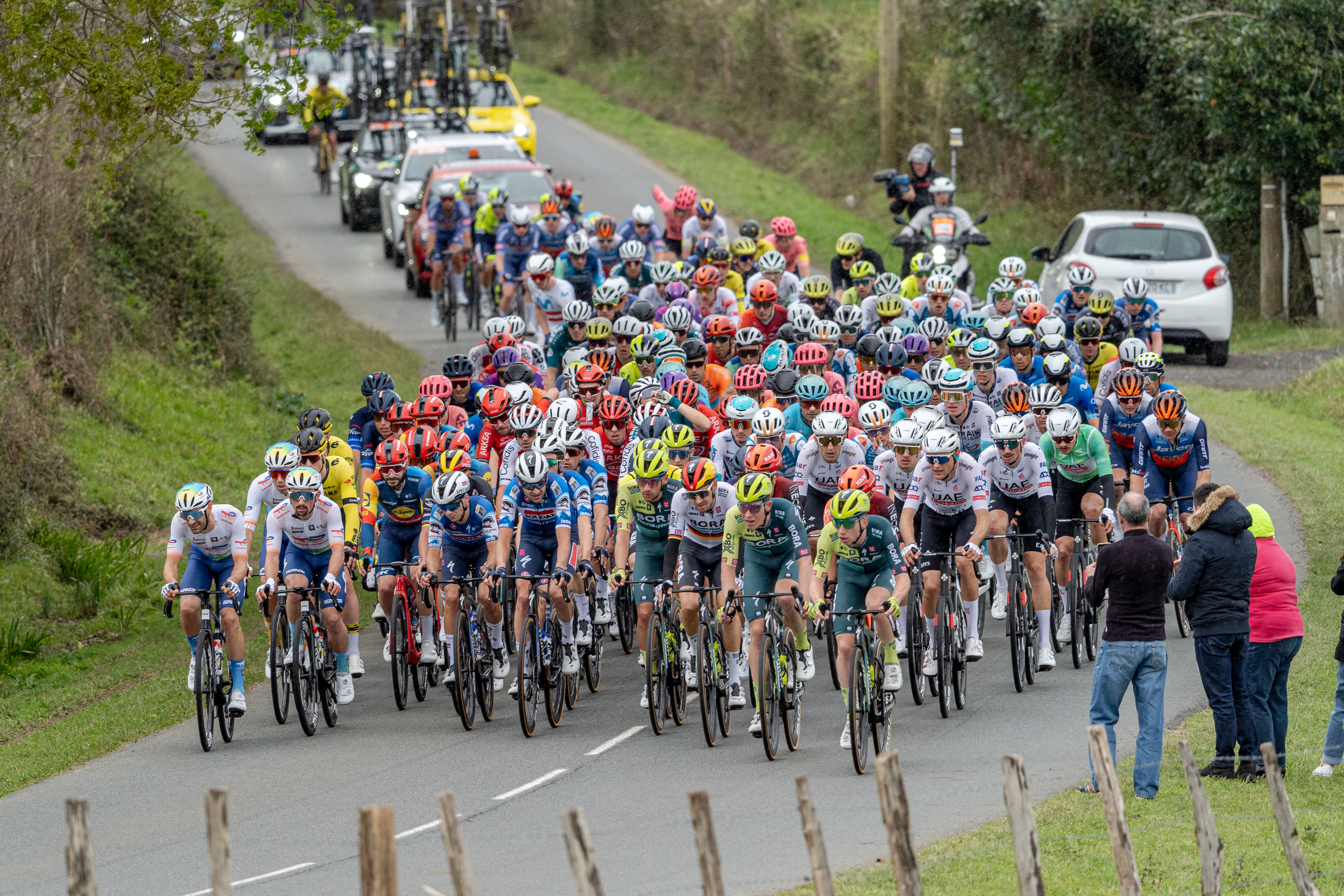
- The peloton during stage 2

Race details
- Dates: 1–6 April 2024
- Stages: 6
- Distance: 832.1 km (517.0 mi)
- Winning time: 15h 56' 50"

Results
Jersey awarded to the overall winner	Winner	Juan Ayuso (ESP)	(UAE Team Emirates)
	Second	Carlos Rodríguez (ESP)	(Ineos Grenadiers)
	Third	Mattias Skjelmose (DEN)	(Lidl–Trek)
Jersey awarded to the points classification winner	Points	Alex Aranburu (ESP)	(Movistar Team)
Jersey awarded to the mountains classification winner	Mountains	Sepp Kuss (USA)	(Visma–Lease a Bike)
Jersey awarded to the youth classification winner	Youth	Juan Ayuso (ESP)	(UAE Team Emirates)
Jersey awarded to the team classification winner	Team	(United Arab Emirates) UAE Team Emirates	

The 2024 Tour of the Basque Country (officially known as Itzulia Basque Country 2024) was a road cycling stage race that took place between 1 and 6 April in the Basque region in northern Spain and southern France. It was the 63rd edition of the Tour of the Basque Country and the 15th race of the 2024 UCI World Tour.

== Teams ==
All 18 UCI WorldTeams and six UCI ProTeams made up the 24 teams that participated in the race. All teams entered a full squad of seven riders, making a total of 168 competitors.

UCI WorldTeams

- Alpecin–Deceuninck
- Arkéa–B&B Hotels
- Astana Qazaqstan Team
- Bora–Hansgrohe
- Cofidis
- Decathlon–AG2R La Mondiale
- EF Education–EasyPost
- Groupama–FDJ
- Ineos Grenadiers
- Intermarché–Wanty
- Lidl–Trek
- Movistar Team
- Soudal–Quick-Step
- Team Bahrain Victorious
- Team dsm–firmenich PostNL
- Team Jayco–AlUla
- UAE Team Emirates
- Visma–Lease a Bike

UCI ProTeams

- Burgos BH
- Caja Rural–Seguros RGA
- Equipo Kern Pharma
- Euskaltel–Euskadi
- Q36.5 Pro Cycling Team
- Team TotalEnergies

== Route ==
Stage characteristics and winners
Stage	Date	Course	Distance	Type	Winner
1	1 April	Irun to Irun	10 km (6.2 mi)	Individual time trial	Primož Roglič (SLO)
2	2 April	Irun to Kanbo (France)	160 km (99 mi)	Hilly stage	Paul Lapeira (FRA)
3	3 April	Ezpeleta (France) to Altsasu	190.9 km (118.6 mi)	Medium mountain stage	Quinten Hermans (BEL)
4	4 April	Etxarri-Aranatz to Legutio	157.5 km (97.9 mi)	Medium mountain stage	Louis Meintjes (RSA)
5	5 April	Vitoria-Gasteiz to Amorebieta-Etxano	175.9 km (109.3 mi)	Medium mountain stage	Romain Grégoire (FRA)
6	6 April	Eibar to Eibar	137.8 km (85.6 mi)	Mountain stage	Carlos Rodríguez (ESP)
Total			832.1 km (517.0 mi)		

== Stages ==
=== Stage 1 ===
1 April 2024 — Irun to Irun, 10 km (6.2 mi) (ITT)

Stage 1 Result
Rank	Rider	Team	Time
1	Primož Roglič (SLO)	Bora–Hansgrohe	12' 34"
2	Jay Vine (AUS)	UAE Team Emirates	+ 7"
3	Mattias Skjelmose (DEN)	Lidl–Trek	+ 10"
4	Remco Evenepoel (BEL)	Soudal–Quick-Step	+ 11"
5	Jonas Vingegaard (DEN)	Visma–Lease a Bike	+ 15"
6	Kévin Vauquelin (FRA)	Arkéa–B&B Hotels	+ 16"
7	Juan Ayuso (ESP)	UAE Team Emirates	+ 16"
8	Maximilian Schachmann (GER)	Bora–Hansgrohe	+ 16"
9	Ethan Hayter (GBR)	Ineos Grenadiers	+ 19"
10	Ion Izagirre (ESP)	Cofidis	+ 21"

General classification after Stage 1
Rank	Rider	Team	Time
1	Primož Roglič (SLO)	Bora–Hansgrohe	12' 34"
2	Jay Vine (AUS)	UAE Team Emirates	+ 7"
3	Mattias Skjelmose (DEN)	Lidl–Trek	+ 10"
4	Remco Evenepoel (BEL)	Soudal–Quick-Step	+ 11"
5	Jonas Vingegaard (DEN)	Visma–Lease a Bike	+ 15"
6	Kévin Vauquelin (FRA)	Arkéa–B&B Hotels	+ 16"
7	Juan Ayuso (ESP)	UAE Team Emirates	+ 16"
8	Maximilian Schachmann (GER)	Bora–Hansgrohe	+ 16"
9	Ethan Hayter (GBR)	Ineos Grenadiers	+ 19"
10	Ion Izagirre (ESP)	Cofidis	+ 21"

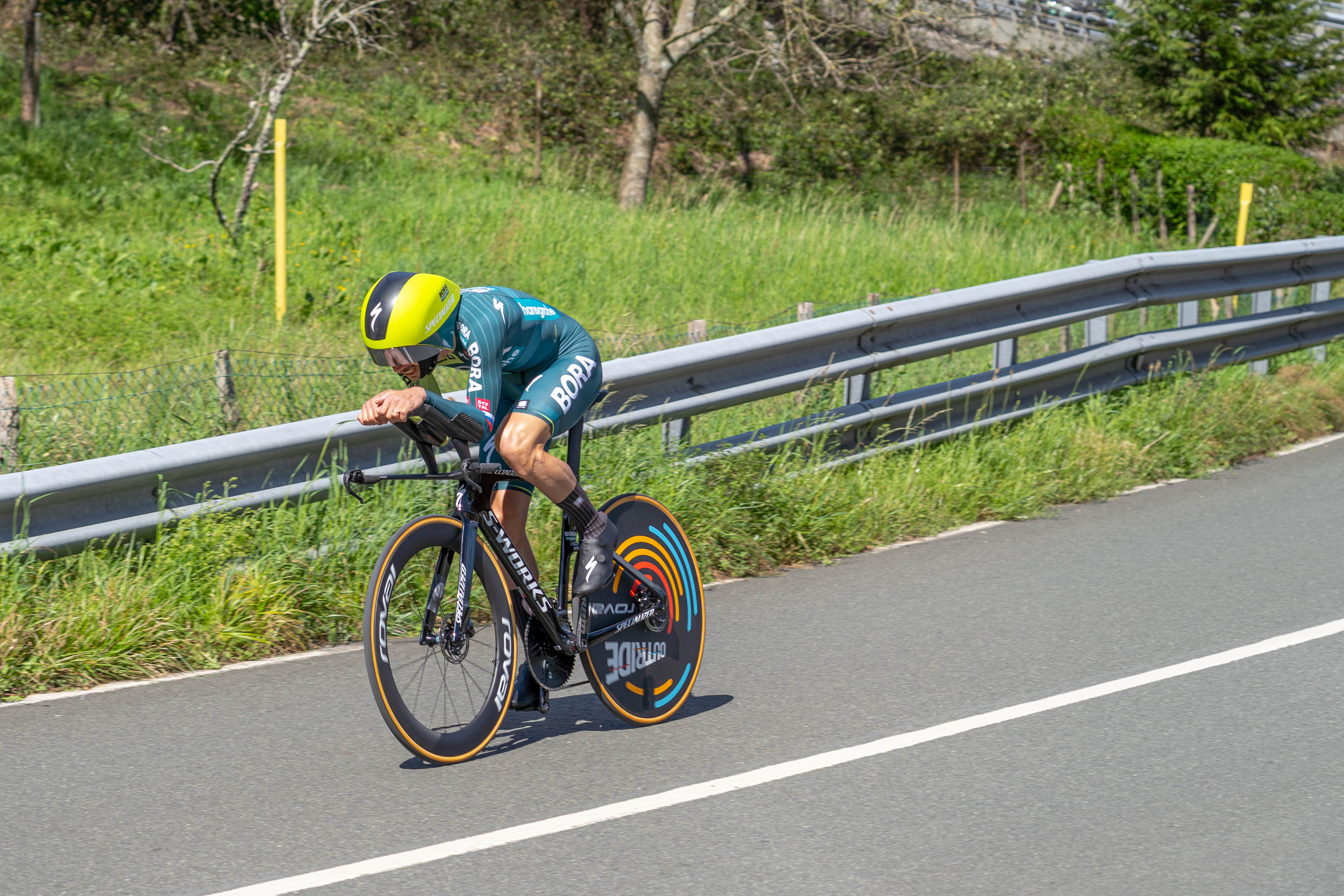
Primož Roglič.

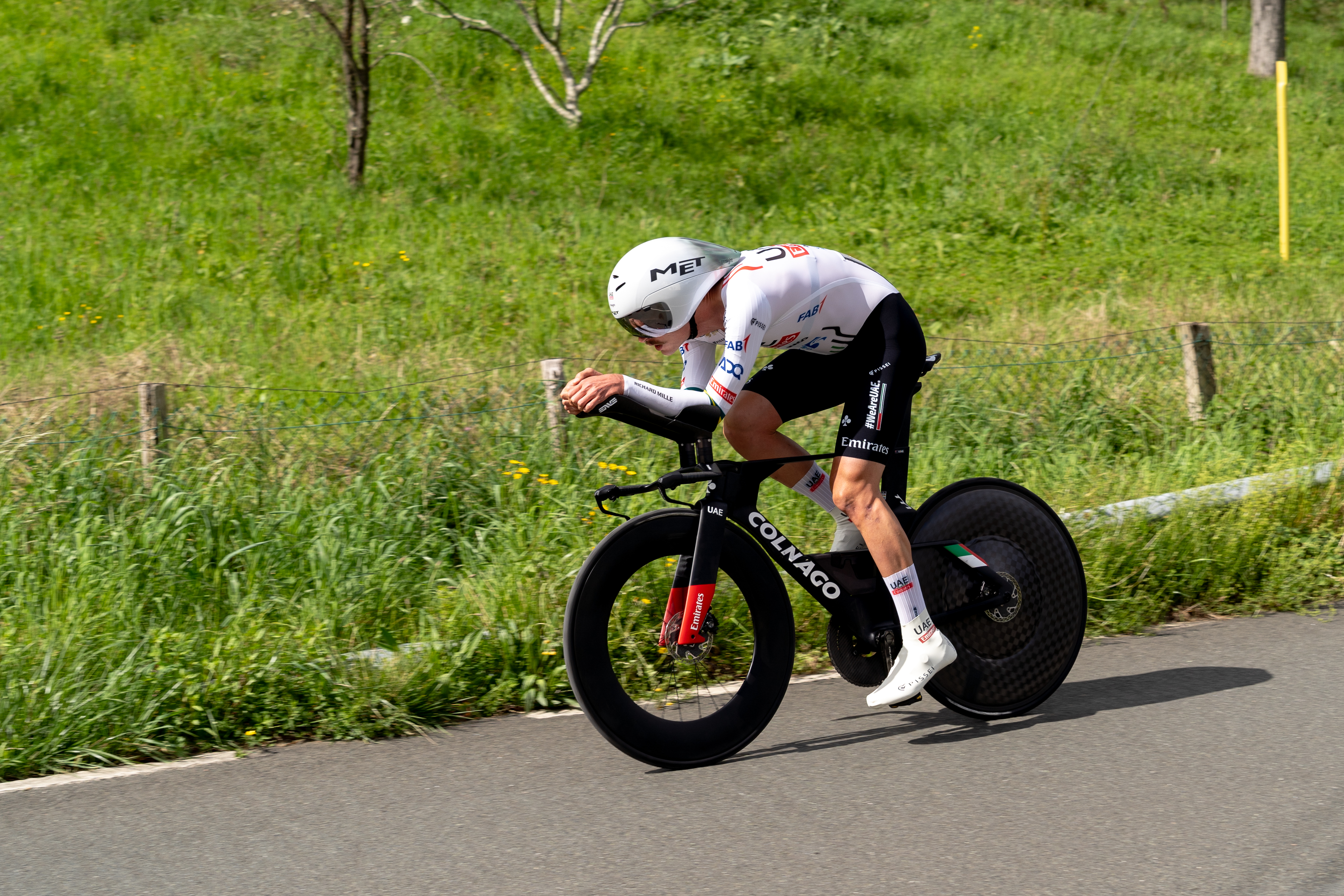
Jay Vine.

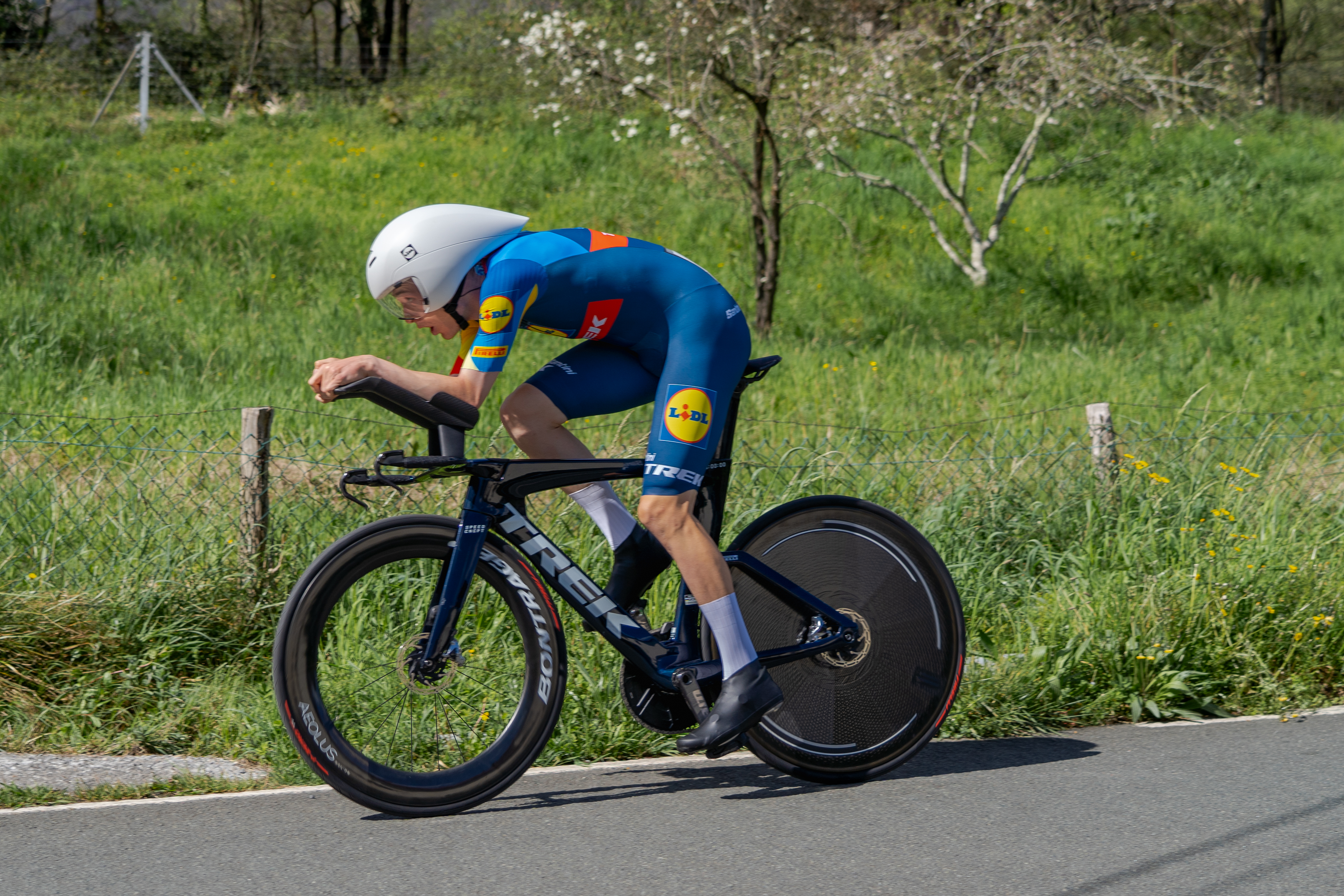
Mattias Skjelmose.

=== Stage 2 ===
2 April 2024 — Irun to Kanbo (France), 160 km (99 mi)

Stage 2 Result
Rank	Rider	Team	Time
1	Paul Lapeira (FRA)	Decathlon–AG2R La Mondiale	3h 42' 28"
2	Samuele Battistella (ITA)	Astana Qazaqstan Team	+ 0"
3	Louis Vervaeke (BEL)	Soudal–Quick-Step	+ 0"
4	Pau Miquel (ESP)	Equipo Kern Pharma	+ 0"
5	Alex Aranburu (ESP)	Movistar Team	+ 0"
6	Guillermo Thomas Silva (URU)	Caja Rural–Seguros RGA	+ 0"
7	Valentin Retailleau (FRA)	Decathlon–AG2R La Mondiale	+ 0"
8	Gonzalo Serrano (ESP)	Movistar Team	+ 0"
9	Brandon McNulty (USA)	UAE Team Emirates	+ 0"
10	Quinten Hermans (BEL)	Alpecin–Deceuninck	+ 0"

General classification after Stage 2
Rank	Rider	Team	Time
1	Primož Roglič (SLO)	Bora–Hansgrohe	3h 55' 02"
2	Mattias Skjelmose (DEN)	Lidl–Trek	+ 10"
3	Remco Evenepoel (BEL)	Soudal–Quick-Step	+ 10"
4	Juan Ayuso (ESP)	UAE Team Emirates	+ 14"
5	Jonas Vingegaard (DEN)	Visma–Lease a Bike	+ 15"
6	Kévin Vauquelin (FRA)	Arkéa–B&B Hotels	+ 16"
7	Maximilian Schachmann (GER)	Bora–Hansgrohe	+ 16"
8	Brandon McNulty (USA)	UAE Team Emirates	+ 23"
9	Bruno Armirail (FRA)	Groupama–FDJ	+ 24"
10	Pello Bilbao (ESP)	Team Bahrain Victorious	+ 25"

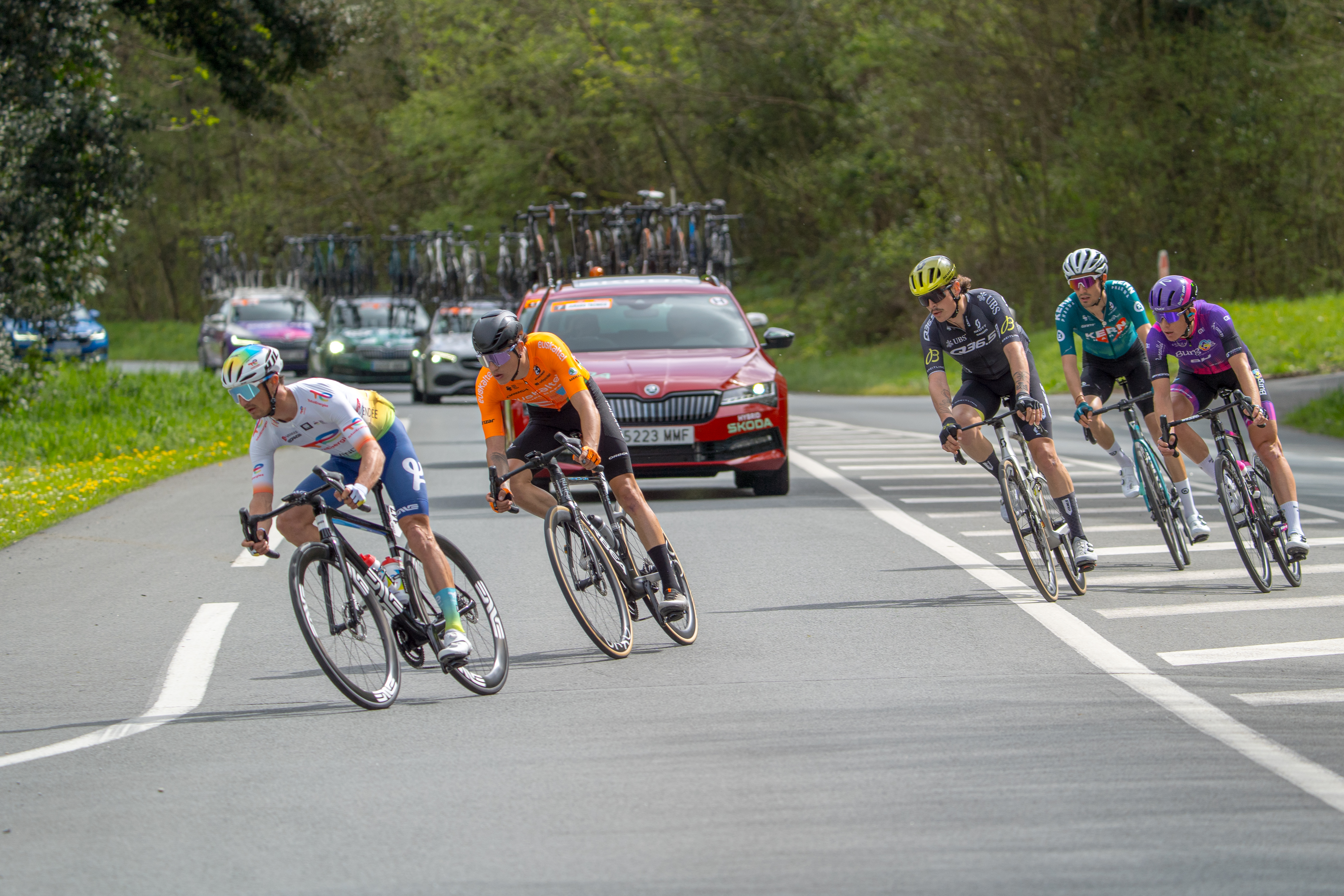
Breakaway before Cambo-les-Bains.

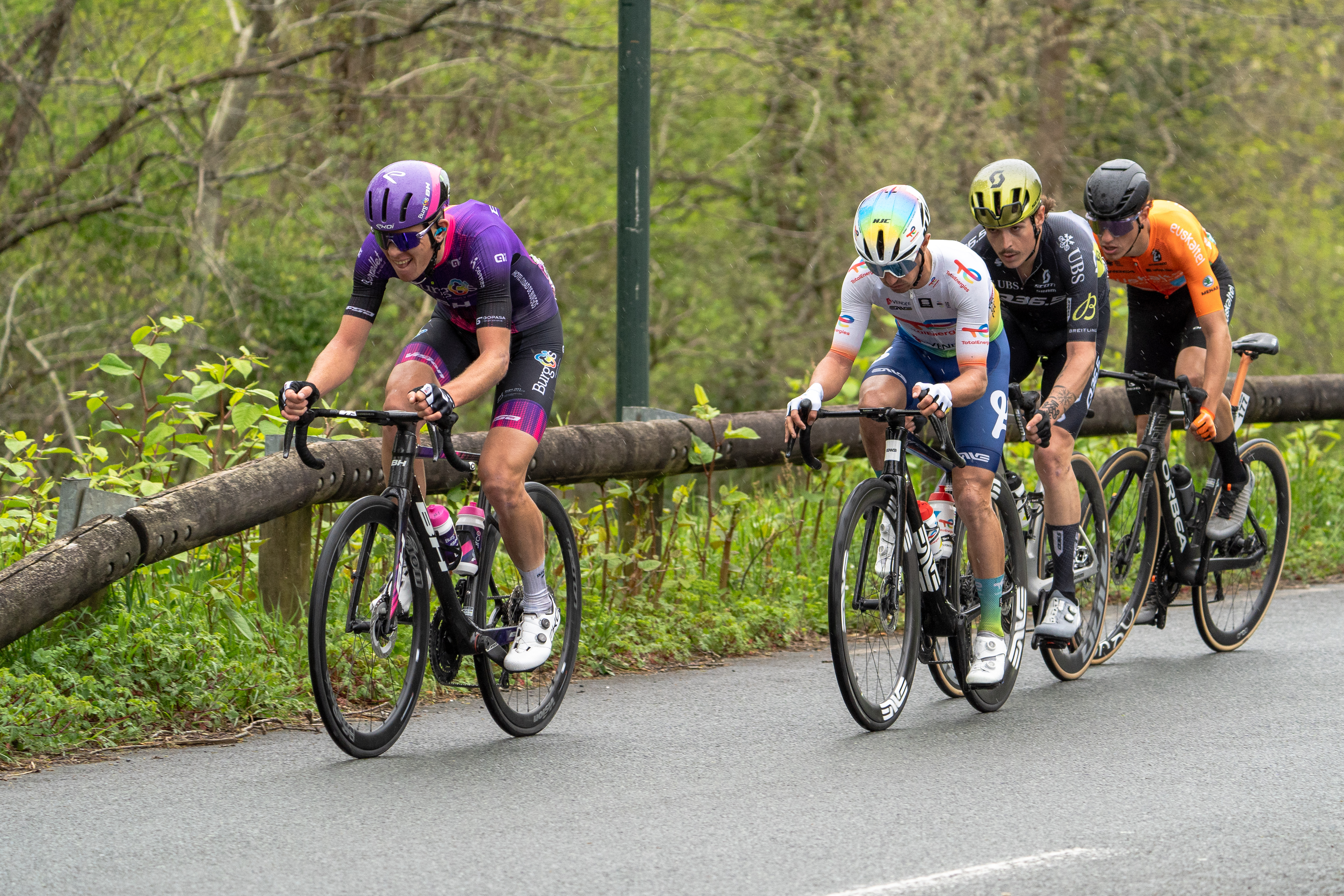
Breakaway after Ustaritz.

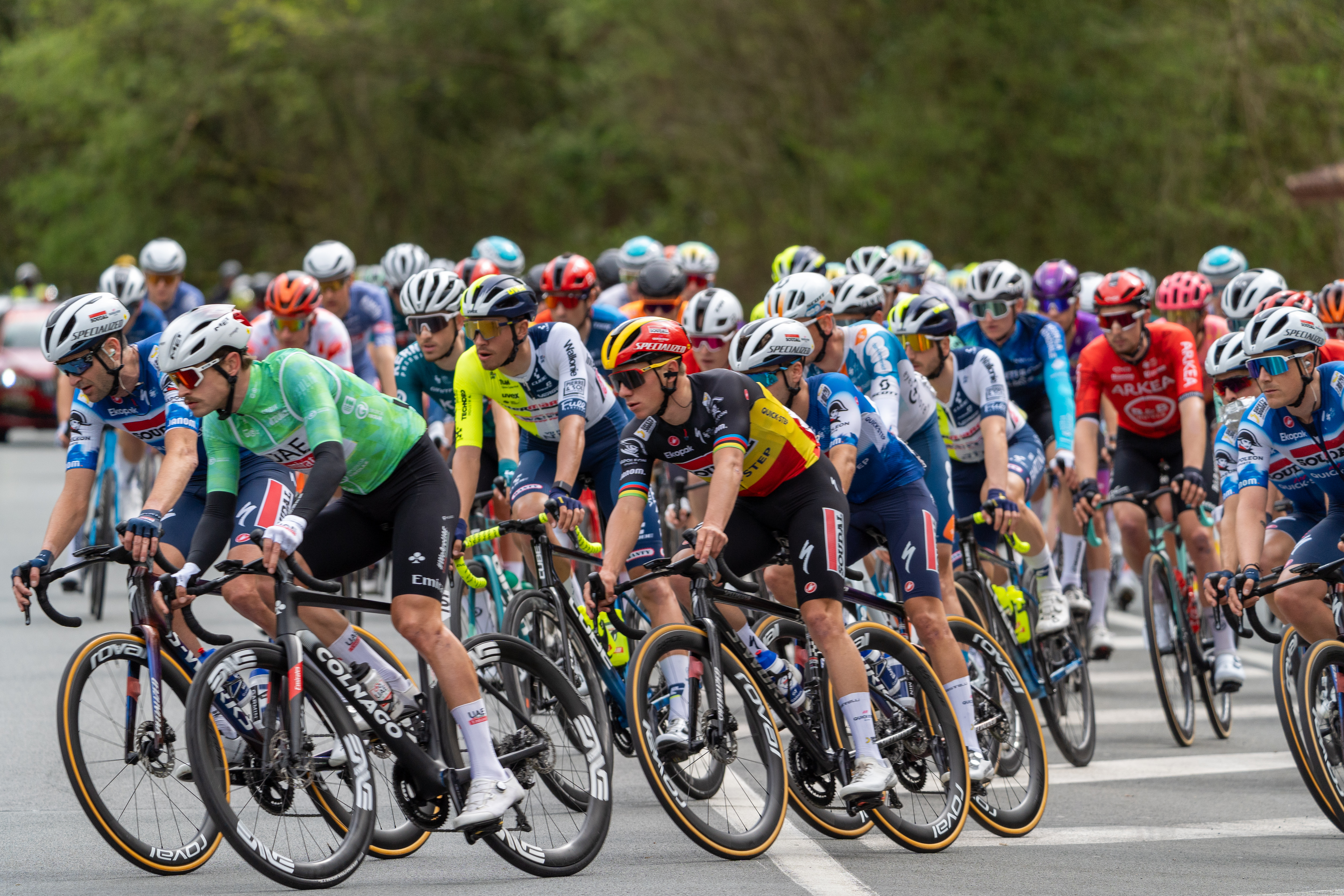
Peloton.

=== Stage 3 ===
3 April 2024 — Ezpeleta (France) to Altsasu, 190.9 km (118.6 mi)

Stage 3 Result
Rank	Rider	Team	Time
1	Quinten Hermans (BEL)	Alpecin–Deceuninck	4h 40' 59"
2	Edoardo Zambanini (ITA)	Team Bahrain Victorious	+ 0"
3	Alex Aranburu (ESP)	Movistar Team	+ 0"
4	Davide De Pretto (ITA)	Team Jayco–AlUla	+ 0"
5	Nikias Arndt (GER)	Team Bahrain Victorious	+ 0"
6	Ethan Hayter (GBR)	Ineos Grenadiers	+ 0"
7	Romain Grégoire (FRA)	Groupama–FDJ	+ 0"
8	Kévin Vauquelin (FRA)	Arkéa–B&B Hotels	+ 0"
9	Vito Braet (BEL)	Intermarché–Wanty	+ 0"
10	Valentin Retailleau (FRA)	Decathlon–AG2R La Mondiale	+ 0"

General classification after Stage 3
Rank	Rider	Team	Time
1	Primož Roglič (SLO)	Bora–Hansgrohe	8h 36' 01"
2	Remco Evenepoel (BEL)	Soudal–Quick-Step	+ 7"
3	Mattias Skjelmose (DEN)	Lidl–Trek	+ 10"
4	Juan Ayuso (ESP)	UAE Team Emirates	+ 14"
5	Jonas Vingegaard (DEN)	Visma–Lease a Bike	+ 14"
6	Kévin Vauquelin (FRA)	Arkéa–B&B Hotels	+ 16"
7	Maximilian Schachmann (GER)	Bora–Hansgrohe	+ 16"
8	Brandon McNulty (USA)	UAE Team Emirates	+ 23"
9	Bruno Armirail (FRA)	Groupama–FDJ	+ 24"
10	Pello Bilbao (ESP)	Team Bahrain Victorious	+ 25"

=== Stage 4 ===
4 April 2024 — Etxarri-Aranatz to Legutio, 157.5 km (97.9 mi)

Stage 4 was marred by a large crash on a descent 35 kilometers from the finish, which took out race favorites Primož Roglič, Jonas Vingegaard and Remco Evenepoel among others. Due to this, the peloton was neutralized for the remainder of the stage, and GC times were not taken at the finish. However, the breakaway of six riders were permitted to continue on and contest the stage win.

Stage 4 Result
Rank	Rider	Team	Time
1	Louis Meintjes (RSA)	Intermarché–Wanty	4h 21' 15"
2	Reuben Thompson (NZL)	Groupama–FDJ	+ 0"
3	Karel Vacek (CZE)	Burgos BH	+ 0"
4	Mikel Retegi (ESP)	Equipo Kern Pharma	+ 0"
5	Mathieu Burgaudeau (FRA)	Team TotalEnergies	+ 0"
6	Joseba López (ESP)	Caja Rural–Seguros RGA	+ 0"
7	Lorenzo Rota (ITA)	Intermarché–Wanty	+ 0"
8	Kevin Colleoni (ITA)	Intermarché–Wanty	+ 0"
9	Iván Cobo (ESP)	Equipo Kern Pharma	+ 0"
10	José Manuel Díaz (ESP)	Burgos BH	+ 0"

General classification after Stage 4
Rank	Rider	Team	Time
1	Mattias Skjelmose (DEN)	Lidl–Trek	8h 36' 11"
2	Juan Ayuso (ESP)	UAE Team Emirates	+ 4"
3	Kévin Vauquelin (FRA)	Arkéa–B&B Hotels	+ 6"
4	Maximilian Schachmann (GER)	Bora–Hansgrohe	+ 6"
5	Brandon McNulty (USA)	UAE Team Emirates	+ 13"
6	Bruno Armirail (FRA)	Groupama–FDJ	+ 14"
7	Pello Bilbao (ESP)	Team Bahrain Victorious	+ 15"
8	Paul Lapeira (FRA)	Decathlon–AG2R La Mondiale	+ 16"
9	Nelson Oliveira (POR)	Movistar Team	+ 18"
10	Romain Grégoire (FRA)	Groupama–FDJ	+ 18"

=== Stage 5 ===
5 April 2024 — Vitoria-Gasteiz to Amorebieta-Etxano, 175.9 km (109.3 mi)

Stage 5 Result
Rank	Rider	Team	Time
1	Romain Grégoire (FRA)	Groupama–FDJ	3h 43' 28"
2	Orluis Aular (VEN)	Caja Rural–Seguros RGA	+ 0"
3	Maximilian Schachmann (GER)	Bora–Hansgrohe	+ 0"
4	Quentin Pacher (FRA)	Groupama–FDJ	+ 0"
5	Alex Aranburu (ESP)	Movistar Team	+ 0"
6	Santiago Buitrago (COL)	Team Bahrain Victorious	+ 0"
7	Pello Bilbao (ESP)	Team Bahrain Victorious	+ 0"
8	Damien Howson (AUS)	Q36.5 Pro Cycling Team	+ 0"
9	Samuele Battistella (ITA)	Astana Qazaqstan Team	+ 0"
10	Carlos Rodríguez (ESP)	Ineos Grenadiers	+ 0"

General classification after Stage 5
Rank	Rider	Team	Time
1	Mattias Skjelmose (DEN)	Lidl–Trek	12h 19' 39"
2	Maximilian Schachmann (GER)	Bora–Hansgrohe	+ 2"
3	Juan Ayuso (ESP)	UAE Team Emirates	+ 4"
4	Kévin Vauquelin (FRA)	Arkéa–B&B Hotels	+ 6"
5	Romain Grégoire (FRA)	Groupama–FDJ	+ 8"
6	Brandon McNulty (USA)	UAE Team Emirates	+ 13"
7	Bruno Armirail (FRA)	Groupama–FDJ	+ 14"
8	Pello Bilbao (ESP)	Team Bahrain Victorious	+ 15"
9	Alex Aranburu (ESP)	Movistar Team	+ 23"
10	Jordan Jegat (FRA)	Team TotalEnergies	+ 30"

=== Stage 6 ===
6 April 2024 — Eibar to Eibar, 137.8 km (85.6 mi)

Stage 6 Result
Rank	Rider	Team	Time
1	Carlos Rodríguez (ESP)	Ineos Grenadiers	3h 37' 13"
2	Juan Ayuso (ESP)	UAE Team Emirates	+ 0"
3	Marc Soler (ESP)	UAE Team Emirates	+ 41"
4	Mattias Skjelmose (DEN)	Lidl–Trek	+ 41"
5	Oscar Onley (GBR)	Team dsm–firmenich PostNL	+ 41"
6	Bauke Mollema (NED)	Lidl–Trek	+ 1' 31"
7	Brandon McNulty (USA)	UAE Team Emirates	+ 1' 31"
8	Pello Bilbao (ESP)	Team Bahrain Victorious	+ 1' 31"
9	Esteban Chaves (COL)	EF Education–EasyPost	+ 1' 31"
10	Isaac del Toro (MEX)	UAE Team Emirates	+ 1' 41"

General classification after Stage 6
Rank	Rider	Team	Time
1	Juan Ayuso (ESP)	UAE Team Emirates	15h 56' 50"
2	Carlos Rodríguez (ESP)	Ineos Grenadiers	+ 42"
3	Mattias Skjelmose (DEN)	Lidl–Trek	+ 43"
4	Marc Soler (ESP)	UAE Team Emirates	+ 1' 23"
5	Brandon McNulty (USA)	UAE Team Emirates	+ 1' 46"
6	Pello Bilbao (ESP)	Team Bahrain Victorious	+ 1' 48"
7	Isaac del Toro (MEX)	UAE Team Emirates	+ 2' 15"
8	Kévin Vauquelin (FRA)	Arkéa–B&B Hotels	+ 2' 38"
9	Ion Izagirre (ESP)	Cofidis	+ 3' 06"
10	Alex Baudin (FRA)	Decathlon–AG2R La Mondiale	+ 3' 07"

== Classification leadership table ==
Classification leadership by stage
Stage	Winner	General classification	Points classification	Mountains classification	Young rider classification	Basque rider classification	Team classification	Combativity award
1	Primož Roglič	Primož Roglič	Primož Roglič	Primož Roglič	Juan Ayuso	Ion Izagirre	UAE Team Emirates	Primož Roglič
2	Paul Lapeira	Primož Roglič	Primož Roglič	Primož Roglič	Juan Ayuso	Pello Bilbao	Bora–Hansgrohe	Alexis Vuillermoz
3	Quinten Hermans	Primož Roglič	Quinten Hermans	Louis Meintjes	Juan Ayuso	Pello Bilbao	Bora–Hansgrohe	Primož Roglič
4	Louis Meintjes	Mattias Skjelmose	Quinten Hermans	Louis Meintjes	Juan Ayuso	Pello Bilbao	Bora–Hansgrohe	Louis Meintjes
5	Romain Grégoire	Mattias Skjelmose	Alex Aranburu	Louis Meintjes	Juan Ayuso	Pello Bilbao	UAE Team Emirates	Isaac del Toro
6	Carlos Rodríguez	Juan Ayuso	Alex Aranburu	Sepp Kuss	Juan Ayuso	Pello Bilbao	UAE Team Emirates	Marc Soler
Final		Juan Ayuso	Alex Aranburu	Sepp Kuss	Juan Ayuso	Pello Bilbao	UAE Team Emirates	Not awarded

== Classification standings ==
Legend
Denotes the winner of the general classification	Denotes the winner of the young rider classification
Denotes the winner of the points classification	Denotes the winner of the team classification
Denotes the winner of the mountains classification	Denotes the winner of the combativity award

=== General classification ===
Final general classification (1–10)
Rank	Rider	Team	Time
1	Juan Ayuso (ESP)	UAE Team Emirates	15h 56' 50"
2	Carlos Rodríguez (ESP)	Ineos Grenadiers	+ 42"
3	Mattias Skjelmose (DEN)	Lidl–Trek	+ 43"
4	Marc Soler (ESP)	UAE Team Emirates	+ 1' 23"
5	Brandon McNulty (USA)	UAE Team Emirates	+ 1' 46"
6	Pello Bilbao (ESP)	Team Bahrain Victorious	+ 1' 48"
7	Isaac del Toro (MEX)	UAE Team Emirates	+ 2' 15"
8	Kévin Vauquelin (FRA)	Arkéa–B&B Hotels	+ 2' 38"
9	Ion Izagirre (ESP)	Cofidis	+ 3' 06"
10	Alex Baudin (FRA)	Decathlon–AG2R La Mondiale	+ 3' 07"

=== Points classification ===
Final points classification (1–10)
Rank	Rider	Team	Time
1	Alex Aranburu (ESP)	Movistar Team	40
2	Juan Ayuso (ESP)	UAE Team Emirates	35
3	Romain Grégoire (FRA)	Groupama–FDJ	34
4	Quinten Hermans (BEL)	Alpecin–Deceuninck	31
5	Carlos Rodríguez (ESP)	Ineos Grenadiers	31
6	Mattias Skjelmose (DEN)	Lidl–Trek	30
7	Isaac del Toro (MEX)	UAE Team Emirates	28
8	Samuele Battistella (ITA)	Astana Qazaqstan Team	27
9	Marc Soler (ESP)	UAE Team Emirates	26
10	Paul Lapeira (FRA)	Decathlon–AG2R La Mondiale	25

=== Mountains classification ===
Final mountains classification (1–10)
Rank	Rider	Team	Time
1	Sepp Kuss (USA)	Visma–Lease a Bike	35
2	Louis Meintjes (RSA)	Intermarché–Wanty	20
3	Isaac del Toro (MEX)	UAE Team Emirates	15
4	Rein Taaramäe (EST)	Intermarché–Wanty	15
5	Igor Arrieta (ESP)	UAE Team Emirates	15
6	Oscar Onley (GBR)	Team dsm–firmenich PostNL	14
7	Marc Soler (ESP)	UAE Team Emirates	14
8	Esteban Chaves (COL)	EF Education–EasyPost	12
9	Alan Jousseaume (FRA)	Team TotalEnergies	11
10	Eric Antonio Fagúndez (URU)	Burgos BH	11

=== Young rider classification ===
Final young rider classification (1–10)
Rank	Rider	Team	Time
1	Juan Ayuso (ESP)	UAE Team Emirates	15h 56' 50"
2	Isaac del Toro (MEX)	UAE Team Emirates	+ 2' 15"
3	Oscar Onley (GBR)	Team dsm–firmenich PostNL	+ 4' 48"
4	William Junior Lecerf (BEL)	Soudal–Quick-Step	+ 6' 31"
5	Romain Grégoire (FRA)	Groupama–FDJ	+ 9' 39"
6	Gianmarco Garofoli (ITA)	Astana Qazaqstan Team	+ 12' 42"
7	Johannes Staune-Mittet (DEN)	Visma–Lease a Bike	+ 13' 52"
8	Igor Arrieta (ESP)	UAE Team Emirates	+ 17' 14"
9	Alexy Faure Prost (FRA)	Intermarché–Wanty	+ 25' 07"
10	Iker Mintegi (ESP)	Euskaltel–Euskadi	+ 28' 11"

=== Basque rider classification ===
Final Basque rider classification (1–10)
Rank	Rider	Team	Time
1	Pello Bilbao (ESP)	Team Bahrain Victorious	15h 58' 38"
2	Ion Izagirre (ESP)	Cofidis	+ 1' 18"
3	Alex Aranburu (ESP)	Movistar Team	+ 2' 13"
4	Víctor de la Parte (ESP)	Euskaltel–Euskadi	+ 4' 30"
5	Ibon Ruiz (ESP)	Equipo Kern Pharma	+ 5' 22"
6	Jonathan Castroviejo (ESP)	Ineos Grenadiers	+ 13' 49"
7	Igor Arrieta (ESP)	UAE Team Emirates	+ 15' 26"
8	Txomin Juaristi (ESP)	Euskaltel–Euskadi	+ 15' 50"
9	Jon Barrenetxea (ESP)	Movistar Team	+ 17' 37"
10	Unai Iribar (ESP)	Equipo Kern Pharma	+ 20' 58"

=== Team classification ===
Final team classification (1–10)
Rank	Team	Time
1	(United Arab Emirates) UAE Team Emirates	47h 53' 27"
2	Team Bahrain Victorious	+ 8' 30"
3	(United Kingdom) Ineos Grenadiers	+ 8' 36"
4	(United States) EF Education–EasyPost	+ 9' 47"
5	(Germany) Bora–Hansgrohe	+ 9' 53"
6	(United States) Lidl–Trek	+ 10' 00"
7	(Spain) Movistar Team	+ 13' 49"
8	(Netherlands) Visma–Lease a Bike	+ 17' 02"
9	(France) Decathlon–AG2R La Mondiale	+ 17' 59"
10	(Netherlands) Team dsm–firmenich PostNL	+ 18' 48"
