= Combativity award =

Road bicycle racing award

The combativity award is a prize given in road bicycle racing to a stage's or the overall race's most aggressive rider. Usually this award is given by the race organizers special jury, to the rider who shows the consistency and effort in attacks, most time spent in breakaway, and positive sportsmanship, among others.
