= List of career achievements by Tadej Pogačar =

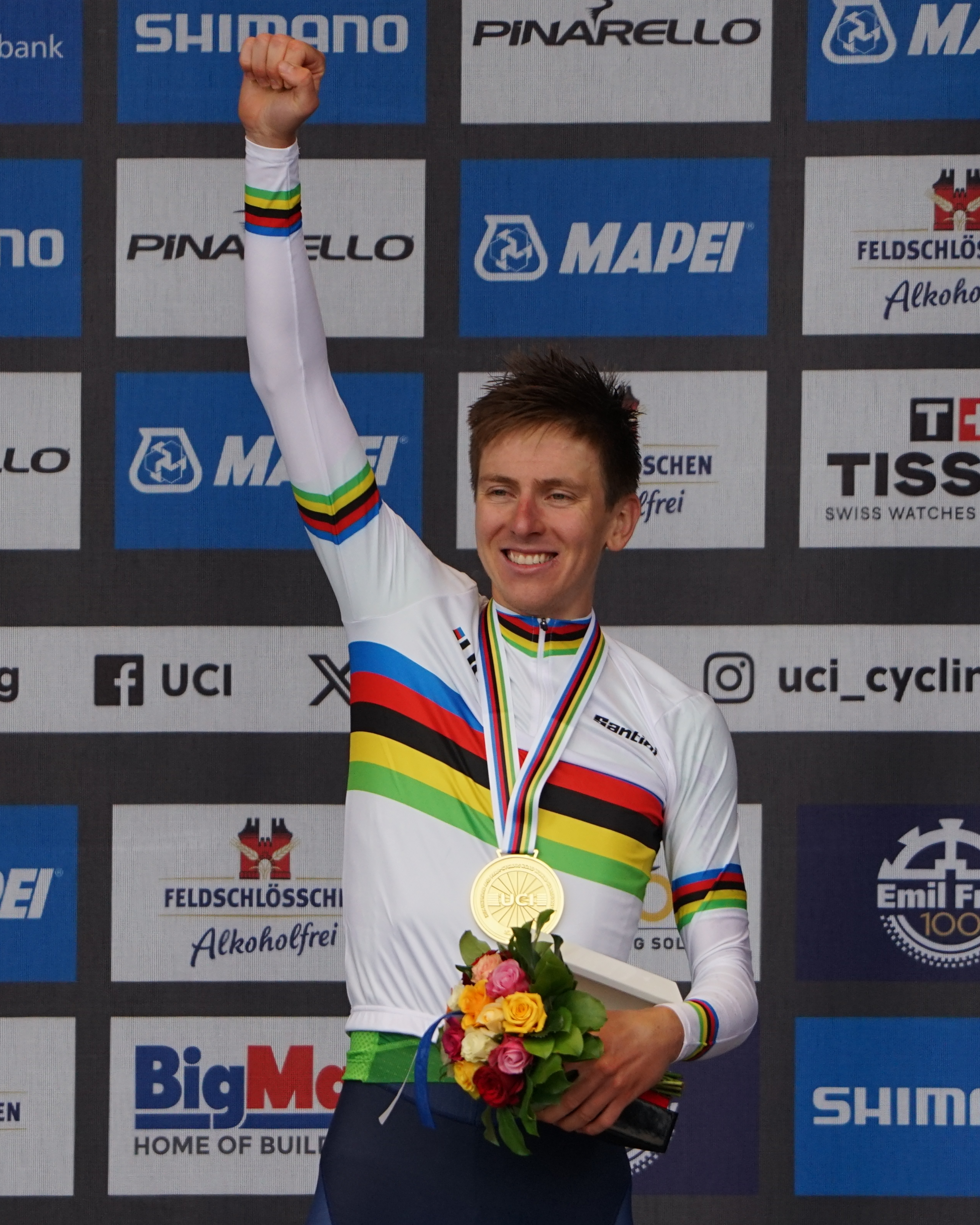
- Pogačar at the 2024 UCI Road World Championships

Cycling career
- Sport: Cycling

Major wins
- Grand Tours Tour de France General classification (2020, 2021, 2024, 2025, 2026) Mountains classification (2020, 2021, 2025) Young rider classification (2020–2023) 26 individual stages (2020–2026) Giro d'Italia General classification (2024) Mountains classification (2024) 6 individual stages (2024) Vuelta a España Young rider classification (2019) 6 individual stages (2019, 2026) Stage races Tirreno–Adriatico (2021, 2022) Paris–Nice (2023) Volta a Catalunya (2024) Critérium du Dauphiné (2025) Tour de Romandie (2026) Tour de Suisse (2026) UAE Tour (2021, 2022, 2025) Tour of California (2019) Tour of Slovenia (2021, 2022) Volta ao Algarve (2019) Volta a la Comunitat Valenciana (2020) Vuelta a Andalucía (2023) One-day races and Classics World Road Race Championships (2024, 2025) European Road Race Championships (2025) National Road Race Championships (2023) National Time Trial Championships (2019, 2020, 2023) Milan–San Remo (2026) Tour of Flanders (2023, 2025, 2026) Liège–Bastogne–Liège (2021, 2024, 2025, 2026) Giro di Lombardia (2021, 2022, 2023, 2024, 2025) Strade Bianche (2022, 2024, 2025, 2026) GP de Montréal (2022, 2024) La Flèche Wallonne (2023, 2025) Amstel Gold Race (2023) Tre Valli Varesine (2022, 2025) Giro dell'Emilia (2024) Other UCI World Ranking (2021, 2022, 2023, 2024, 2025) UCI Europe Tour (2021, 2022, 2023, 2024, 2025) Vélo d'Or (2021, 2024, 2025)
Medal record
Men's road cycling
Representing Slovenia
Olympic Games
Bronze medal – third place	2020 Tokyo	Road race
World Championships
Gold medal – first place	2024 Zürich	Road race
Gold medal – first place	2025 Kigali	Road race
Bronze medal – third place	2023 Glasgow	Road race

This is a list of career achievements by Tadej Pogačar, a Slovenian professional racing cyclist for UCI WorldTeam UAE Team Emirates XRG.

After a successful junior career, which included winning the 2018 Tour de l'Avenir, Pogačar debuted as a professional with UAE Team Emirates XRG in 2019. Pogačar won the 2020 Tour de France, also taking the young rider and mountains classification, an unprecedented combination; he repeated this feat in 2021. He won further Tours in 2021, 2024, 2025 & 2026 as well as the 2024 Giro d'Italia and 2024 UCI Road World Championships road race to complete the Triple Crown of Cycling.

== Career highlights ==
2019

- Wins his first National Cyclo-cross Championship title.
- Wins his first National Time Trial Championship title.
- Wins his first Grand Tour stage, Vuelta a España Stage 9.

2020

- Wins his second National Time Trial Championship title.
- Wins his first Grand Tour, Tour de France.

2021

- Wins his first Monument, Liège–Bastogne–Liège.
- Wins his second Grand Tour, Tour de France for the second time.
- Claimed his first Olympic medal, winning the bronze in the Road race at the Olympics in Tokyo.
- Wins his second Monument, Giro di Lombardia.

2022

- Wins his third Monument, Giro di Lombardia for the second time.

2023

- Wins his fourth Monument, Tour of Flanders.
- Wins his third National Time Trial Championship title.
- Wins his first National Road Race Championship title.
- Wins his fifth Monument, Giro di Lombardia for the third time.

2024

- Wins his sixth Monument, Liège–Bastogne–Liège for the second time.
- Wins his third Grand Tour, Giro d'Italia.
- Wins his fourth Grand Tour, Tour de France for the third time.
- Wins his first UCI Road World Championships title, winning the Triple Crown of Cycling in the process.
- Wins his seventh Monument, Giro di Lombardia for the fourth time.

2025

- Wins his eighth Monument, Tour of Flanders for the second time.
- Wins his ninth Monument, Liège–Bastogne–Liège for the third time.
- Achieved 100 professional wins with victory on Stage 4 of the 2025 Tour de France.
- Wins his fifth Grand Tour, Tour de France for the fourth time.
- Wins his second UCI Road World Championships title.
- Wins his first European Road Cycling Championships.
- Wins his tenth Monument, Giro di Lombardia for the fifth time becoming the first rider to win a monument 5 consecutive times.
- Becomes the first rider to stand on the podium in all 5 monuments in the same season.

2026

- Wins his eleventh Monument, Milan–San Remo for the first time.
- Wins his twelfth Monument, Tour of Flanders for the third time.
- Wins his thirteeth Monument, Liège–Bastogne–Liège for the fourth time.
- Becomes the first rider to win 2 separate monuments 3 consecutive times.
- Becomes the first rider to finish on the podium of all ten major stage races.
- Wins his sixth Grand Tour, Tour de France for the fifth time.

== Career achievements ==
=== Major championships timeline ===
Event		2017	2018	2019	2020	2021	2022	2023	2024	2025	2026
Olympic Games	Road race	Not held				3	Not held		—	Not held	
Olympic Games	Time trial	Not held				—	Not held		—	Not held	
World Championships	Road race	—	—	18	33	37	19	3	1	1	—
World Championships	Time trial	—	—	—	—	10	6	21	—	4	—
European Championships	Road race	—	—	—	—	5	—	—	—	1	
European Championships	Time trial	—	—	—	—	12	—	—	—	—	
National Championships	Cyclo-cross	—	—	1	—	—	—	—	—	—	—
National Championships	Road race	—	6	7	2	5	—	1	—	—	—
National Championships	Time trial	5	2	1	1	3	—	1	—	—	—

=== Cyclo-cross ===
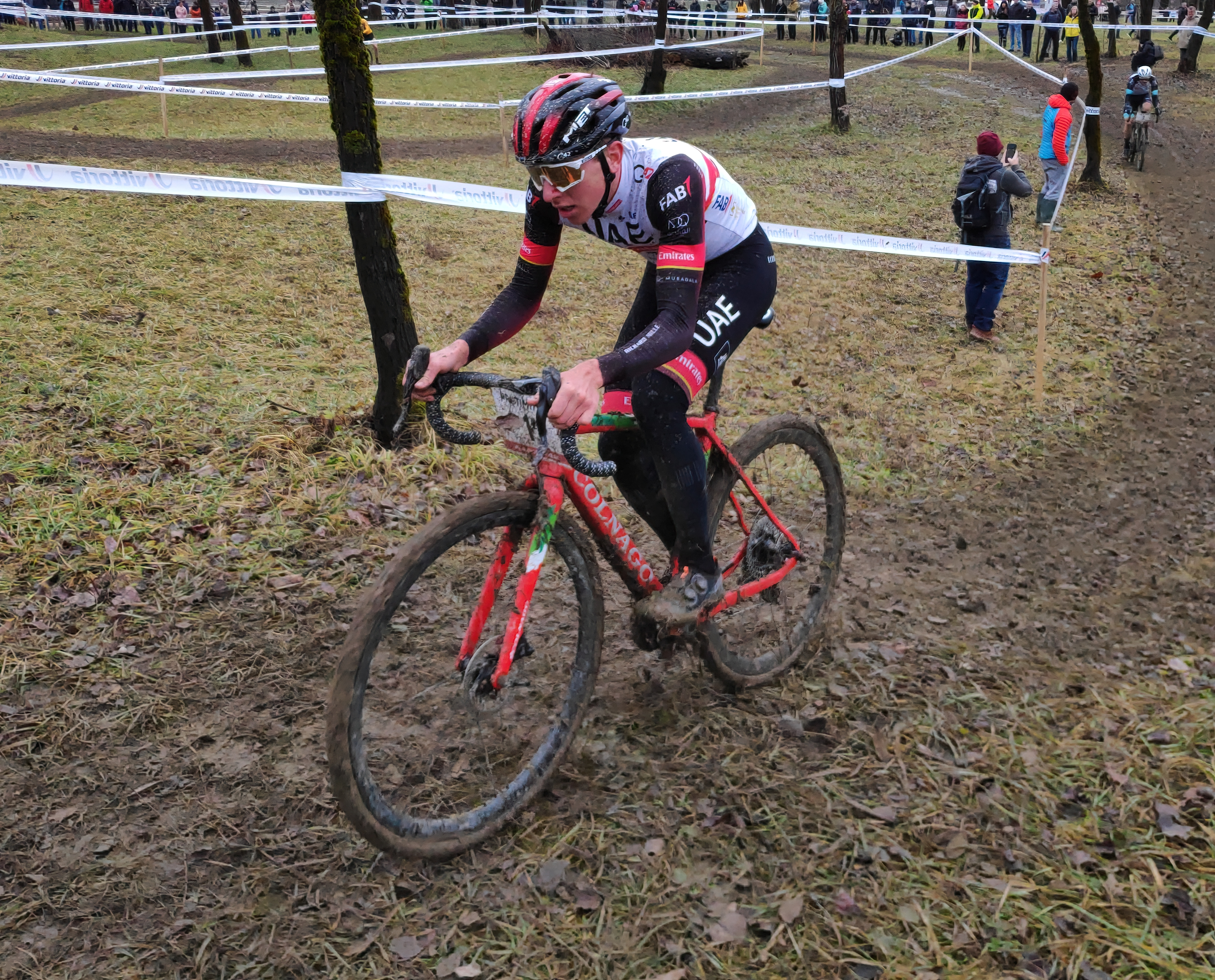
Pogačar winning a Slovenian cyclo-cross race in Ljubljana (2021)

2018–2019
1st National Championships
2021–2022
Slovenian Cup

1st Ljubljana

2022–2023
Slovenian Cup

2nd Ljubljana

=== Road ===
2015
8th Overall Course de la Paix Juniors
2016
1st Time trial, National Junior Championships
1st Overall Giro della Lunigiana

1st Points classification
1st Stage 3

1st Stage 2b Course de la Paix Juniors
3rd Road race, UEC European Junior Championships
3rd Tf GD Dorigo
3rd Montichiari–Roncone
6th Overall Tour du Pays de Vaud
7th G.P. Sportivi Sovilla-La Piccola SanRemo
7th Trofeo Emilio Paganessi
2017
2nd Raiffeisen Grand Prix
3rd Time trial, National Under-23 Championships
3rd Overall Tour de Hongrie
4th Overall Istrian Spring Trophy
5th Time trial, National Championships
5th Overall Tour of Slovenia

1st Young rider classification

5th Overall Carpathian Couriers Race

1st Young rider classification

7th Piccolo Giro di Lombardia
8th GP Laguna
9th GP Capodarco
9th Croatia–Slovenia
10th Giro del Belvedere
2018
National Under-23 Championships

1st Road race
1st Time trial

1st Overall Tour de l'Avenir
1st Overall Grand Prix Priessnitz spa

1st Mountains classification
1st Young rider classification
1st Stage 3

1st Overall Giro del Friuli-Venezia Giulia

1st Young rider classification

1st Trofeo Gianfranco Bianchin
2nd Time trial, National Championships
2nd Gran Premio Palio del Recioto
3rd Overall Istrian Spring Trophy
4th Overall Tour of Slovenia

1st Young rider classification

4th Poreč Trophy
4th Raiffeisen Grand Prix
5th GP Laguna
7th Road race, UCI World Under-23 Championships
8th Giro del Belvedere
2019 (8 pro wins)
1st Time trial, National Championships
1st Overall Tour of California

1st Young rider classification
1st Stage 6

1st Overall Volta ao Algarve

1st Young rider classification
1st Stage 2

3rd Overall Vuelta a España

1st Young rider classification
1st Stages 9, 13 & 20

4th Overall Tour of Slovenia

1st Young rider classification

6th Overall Tour of the Basque Country

1st Young rider classification

6th GP Miguel Induráin
7th Gran Premio di Lugano
2020 (9)
National Championships

1st Time trial
2nd Road race

1st Overall Tour de France

1st Mountains classification
1st Young rider classification
1st Stages 9, 15 & 20 (ITT)

1st Overall Volta a la Comunitat Valenciana

1st Young rider classification
1st Stages 2 & 4

2nd Overall UAE Tour

1st Young rider classification
1st Stage 5

3rd Liège–Bastogne–Liège
4th Overall Critérium du Dauphiné
9th La Flèche Wallonne
2021 (13)
1st Overall Tour de France

1st Mountains classification
1st Young rider classification
1st Stages 5 (ITT), 17 & 18

1st Overall Tirreno–Adriatico

1st Mountains classification
1st Young rider classification
1st Stage 4

1st Overall UAE Tour

1st Young rider classification
1st Stage 3

1st Overall Tour of Slovenia

1st Mountains classification
1st Stage 2

1st Liège–Bastogne–Liège
1st Giro di Lombardia
3rd Road race, Olympic Games
National Championships

3rd Time trial
5th Road race

3rd Overall Tour of the Basque Country

1st Stage 3

3rd Tre Valli Varesine
4th Milano–Torino
5th Road race, UEC European Championships
7th Strade Bianche
10th Time trial, UCI World Championships
2022 (16)
1st Overall Tirreno–Adriatico

1st Points classification
1st Young rider classification
1st Stages 4 & 6

1st Overall UAE Tour

1st Young rider classification
1st Stages 4 & 7

1st Overall Tour of Slovenia

1st Points classification
1st Stages 3 & 5

1st Giro di Lombardia
1st Strade Bianche
1st Grand Prix Cycliste de Montréal
1st Tre Valli Varesine
2nd Overall Tour de France

1st Young rider classification
1st Stages 6, 7 & 17
Held after Stages 6–10

2nd Giro dell'Emilia
4th Tour of Flanders
5th Milan–San Remo
6th Time trial, UCI World Championships
10th Dwars door Vlaanderen
2023 (17)
National Championships

1st Road race
1st Time trial

1st Overall Paris–Nice

1st Points classification
1st Young rider classification
1st Stages 4, 7 & 8

1st Overall Vuelta a Andalucía

1st Points classification
1st Stages 1, 2 & 4

1st Tour of Flanders
1st Giro di Lombardia
1st Amstel Gold Race
1st La Flèche Wallonne
1st Clásica Jaén Paraíso Interior
2nd Overall Tour de France

1st Young rider classification
1st Stages 6 & 20

2nd Giro dell'Emilia
3rd Road race, UCI World Championships
3rd E3 Saxo Classic
3rd Coppa Sabatini
4th Milan–San Remo
4th Giro della Toscana
5th Tre Valli Varesine
2024 (25)
1st Road race, UCI World Championships
1st Overall Tour de France

1st Stages 4, 14, 15, 19, 20 & 21 (ITT)
Held after Stages 11–18
Combativity award Stage 11

1st Overall Giro d'Italia

1st Mountains classification
1st Stages 2, 7 (ITT), 8, 15, 16 & 20

1st Overall Volta a Catalunya

1st Points classification
1st Mountains classification
1st Stages 2, 3, 6 & 7

1st Liège–Bastogne–Liège
1st Giro di Lombardia
1st Strade Bianche
1st Grand Prix Cycliste de Montréal
1st Giro dell'Emilia
3rd Milan–San Remo
7th Grand Prix Cycliste de Québec
2025 (20)
UCI World Championships

1st Road race
4th Time trial

1st Road race, UEC European Championships
1st Overall Tour de France

1st Mountains classification
1st Stages 4, 7, 12 & 13 (ITT)
Held after Stages 5 & 7

1st Overall Critérium du Dauphiné

1st Points classification
1st Stages 1, 6 & 7

1st Overall UAE Tour

1st Stages 3 & 7

1st Tour of Flanders
1st Liège–Bastogne–Liège
1st Giro di Lombardia
1st Strade Bianche
1st La Flèche Wallonne
1st Tre Valli Varesine
2nd Paris–Roubaix
2nd Amstel Gold Race
2nd Grand Prix Cycliste de Montréal
3rd Milan–San Remo
2026 (22)
1st Overall Tour de France

1st Stages 3, 6, 10, 14 & 19
Held after Stage 3
Held after Stages 1 & 6–18
Combativity award Stage 6

1st Overall Tour de Romandie

1st Points classification
1st Stages 1, 2, 4 & 5

1st Overall Tour de Suisse

1st Points classification
1st Stages 1, 4 (ITT) & 5

1st Milan–San Remo
1st Tour of Flanders
1st Liège–Bastogne–Liège
1st Strade Bianche
Vuelta a España

1st Stages 1 (ITT), 4 & 6
Held after Stages 1–7
Held after Stages 1–6
Held after Stages 4–7
Combativity award Stages 4 & 6

2nd Paris–Roubaix

==== General classification results timeline ====
Grand Tour general classification results
Grand Tour	2019	2020	2021	2022	2023	2024	2025	2026
Giro d'Italia	—	—	—	—	—	1	—	—
Tour de France	—	1	1	2	2	1	1	1
Vuelta a España	3	—	—	—	—	—	—	DNF
Major stage race general classification results
Major stage race	2019	2020	2021	2022	2023	2024	2025	2026
Paris–Nice	—	—	—	—	1	—	—	—
Tirreno–Adriatico	—	—	1	1	—	—	—	—
Volta a Catalunya	—	NH	—	—	—	1	—	—
Tour of the Basque Country	6	NH	3	—	—	—	—	—
Tour de Romandie	—	NH	—	—	—	—	—	1
Critérium du Dauphiné	—	4	—	—	—	—	1	—
Tour de Suisse	—	NH	—	—	—	—	—	1

==== Classics results timeline ====
Monument	2019	2020	2021	2022	2023	2024	2025	2026
Milan–San Remo	—	12	—	5	4	3	3	1
Tour of Flanders	—	—	—	4	1	—	1	1
Paris–Roubaix	—	NH	—	—	—	—	2	2
Liège–Bastogne–Liège	18	3	1	—	DNF	1	1	1
Giro di Lombardia	—	—	1	1	1	1	1	—
Classic	2019	2020	2021	2022	2023	2024	2025	2026
Strade Bianche	30	13	7	1	—	1	1	1
Milano–Torino	—	—	4	—	—	—	—	—
E3 Saxo Bank Classic	—	NH	—	—	3	—	—	—
Dwars door Vlaanderen	—	NH	—	10	—	—	—	—
Amstel Gold Race	DNF	NH	—	—	1	—	2	—
La Flèche Wallonne	53	9	—	12	1	—	1	—
Clásica de San Sebastián	DNF	NH	—	DNF	—	—	—	—
Bretagne Classic	—	—	DNF	89	—	—	—	—
Grand Prix Cycliste de Québec	—	Not held		24	—	7	29	—
Grand Prix Cycliste de Montréal	—	Not held		1	—	1	2	—
Giro dell'Emilia	—	—	DNF	2	2	1	—	—
Tre Valli Varesine	—	NH	3	1	5	NR	1	—

Legend
—	Did not compete
DNF	Did not finish
NH	Not Held
NR	No result
IP	In progress

=== Grand Tour record ===
	2019	2020	2021	2022	2023	2024	2025	2026
Giro d'Italia	DNE	DNE	DNE	DNE	DNE	1	DNE	DNE
Stages won	—	—	—	—	—	6	—	—
Points classification	—	—	—	—	—	5	—	—
Mountains classification	—	—	—	—	—	1	—	—
Tour de France	DNE	1	1	2	2	1	1	1
Stages won	—	3	3	3	2	6	4	5
Points classification	—	8	8	3	4	4	2	6
Mountains classification	—	1	1	4	5	2	1	2
Young rider classification	—	1	1	1	1	—	—	—
Vuelta a España	3	DNE	DNE	DNE	DNE	DNE	DNE	DNF-8
Stages won	3	—	—	—	—	—	—	3
Points classification	2	—	—	—	—	—	—	—
Mountains classification	4	—	—	—	—	—	—	—
Young rider classification	1	—	—	—	—	—	—	—

Legend
1	Winner
2–3	Top three-finish
4–10	Top ten-finish
11–	Other finish
DNE	Did not enter
DNF-x	Did not finish (retired on stage x)
DNS-x	Did not start (not started on stage x)
HD-x	Finished outside time limit (occurred on stage x)
DSQ	Disqualified
N/A	Race/classification not held
NR	Not ranked in this classification

=== Awards and nominations ===
- Vélo d'Or: 2021, 2024, 2025
- Eddy Merckx Trophy: 2024, 2025
- International Flandrien of the Year: 2021, 2022
- Laureus World Sportsman Award (nomination): 2025, 2026
- L'Équipe Champion of Champions: 2025
