= List of wins by Bahrain–Merida and its successors =

This is a comprehensive list of victories of the Team Bahrain Victorious cycling team. The races are categorized according to the UCI Continental Circuits rules.

== 2017 – Bahrain–Merida ==
Stage 3 (ITT) Vuelta a San Juan, Ramūnas Navardauskas
Stage 2 Paris–Nice, Sonny Colbrelli
Brabantse Pijl, Sonny Colbrelli
Overall Tour of Croatia, Vincenzo Nibali
Stage 16 Giro d'Italia, Vincenzo Nibali
Stage 8 Tour of Japan, Jon Ander Insausti
Ethiopia National Time Trial Championships, Tsgabu Grmay
Stage 3 Vuelta a España, Vincenzo Nibali
Giro dell'Emilia, Giovanni Visconti
Giro di Lombardia, Vincenzo Nibali

== 2018 – Bahrain–Merida ==
Stage 4 Dubai Tour, Sonny Colbrelli
GP Industria & Artigianato, Matej Mohorič
Milan–San Remo, Vincenzo Nibali
Overall Tour of Croatia, Kanstantsin Siutsou

Stage 1, Niccolò Bonifazio
Stage 3, Kanstantsin Siutsou
Stage 5, Manuele Boaro

Stage 5 Tour of the Alps, Mark Padun
Stage 10 Giro d'Italia, Matej Mohorič
Stages 3 & 7 Tour of Japan, Grega Bole
Stage 1 Hammer Sportzone Limburg
Gran Premio di Lugano, Hermann Pernsteiner
Stage 3 Tour de Suisse, Sonny Colbrelli
Spain National Road Race Championships, Gorka Izagirre
Slovenia National Road Race Championships, Matej Mohorič
Stage 1 Tour of Austria, Matej Mohorič
Stages 2, 4 & 8 Tour of Austria, Giovanni Visconti
Stage 7 Tour of Austria, Antonio Nibali
Overall BinckBank Tour, Matej Mohorič
Overall Deutschland Tour, Matej Mohorič

Stage 3, Matej Mohorič

Coppa Bernocchi, Sonny Colbrelli
Gran Piemonte, Sonny Colbrelli

== 2019 – Bahrain–Merida ==
Stage 4 Tour of Oman, Sonny Colbrelli
Prologue Tour de Romandie, Jan Tratnik
Stage 5 Tour of California, Iván García Cortina
Stage 2 Critérium du Dauphiné, Dylan Teuns
Stage 1 (ITT) Tour de Suisse, Rohan Dennis
Taiwan National Time Trial Championships, Chun Kai Feng
Ukraine National Time Trial Championships, Mark Padun
Slovenia National Road Race Championships, Domen Novak
Stage 6 Tour de France, Dylan Teuns
Stage 20 Tour de France, Vincenzo Nibali
Overall Adriatica Ionica Race, Mark Padun

Stage 2, Mark Padun

Stage 7 Tour de Pologne, Matej Mohorič
Stage 4 Deutschland Tour, Sonny Colbrelli
Coppa Bernocchi, Phil Bauhaus
Gran Premio Bruno Beghelli, Sonny Colbrelli

== 2020 – Bahrain–McLaren ==
Overall Saudi Tour, Phil Bauhaus

Stages 3 & 5, Phil Bauhaus

Stage 5 (ITT) Vuelta a Andalucía, Dylan Teuns
Stage 3 Paris–Nice, Iván García Cortina
Circuito de Getxo, Damiano Caruso
Stage 2 Route d'Occitanie, Sonny Colbrelli
Spain National Time Trial Championships, Pello Bilbao
Stage 16 Giro d'Italia, Jan Tratnik

== 2021 – Team Bahrain Victorious ==
Stage 4 Tour de la Provence, Phil Bauhaus
Stage 4 Tour of the Alps, Pello Bilbao
Stage 2 Tour de Romandie, Sonny Colbrelli
Stages 1 & 3 Tour de Hongrie, Phil Bauhaus
Stage 6 Giro d'Italia, Gino Mäder
Stage 20 Giro d'Italia, Damiano Caruso
Stage 3 Critérium du Dauphiné, Sonny Colbrelli
Stages 7 & 8 Critérium du Dauphiné, Mark Padun
Stages 1 & 5 Tour of Slovenia, Phil Bauhaus
Stage 8 Tour de Suisse, Gino Mäder
Slovenia National Time Trial Championships, Jan Tratnik
Italy National Road Race Championships, Sonny Colbrelli
Slovenia National Road Race Championships, Matej Mohorič
Stages 7 & 19 Tour de France, Matej Mohorič
Stage 8 Tour de France, Dylan Teuns
Overall Vuelta a Burgos, Mikel Landa
Stage 1 Tour de Pologne, Phil Bauhaus
Young rider classification Vuelta a España, Gino Mäder

Stage 9, Damiano Caruso

Overall Benelux Tour, Sonny Colbrelli

Stage 6, Sonny Colbrelli
Stage 7, Matej Mohorič

UEC European Road Championships, Sonny Colbrelli
Memorial Marco Pantani, Sonny Colbrelli
Overall CRO Race

Stage 1, Phil Bauhaus
Stage 5, Stephen Williams

Paris–Roubaix, Sonny Colbrelli

== 2022 – Team Bahrain Victorious ==
Stage 2 Saudi Tour, Santiago Buitrago
Overall Vuelta a Andalucía, Wout Poels

Stage 4, Wout Poels

Stage 7 Tirreno–Adriatico, Phil Bauhaus
Milan–San Remo, Matej Mohorič
Stage 3 Tour of the Basque Country, Pello Bilbao
Stage 2 Tour of the Alps, Pello Bilbao
La Flèche Wallonne, Dylan Teuns
Stage 1 Tour de Romandie, Dylan Teuns
Stage 17 Giro d'Italia, Santiago Buitrago
Stage 1 Tour de Suisse, Stephen Williams
Slovenia National Time Trial Championships, Jan Tratnik
Japan National Road Race Championships, Yukiya Arashiro
Stage 1 Vuelta a Burgos, Santiago Buitrago
Stage 5 Tour de Pologne, Phil Bauhaus
Stage 4 Vuelta a Burgos, Matevž Govekar
Stage 4 Deutschland Tour, Pello Bilbao
Overall CRO Race, Matej Mohorič

Stages 1 & 2, Jonathan Milan

== 2023 – Team Bahrain Victorious ==
Stage 1 Tour Down Under, Phil Bauhaus
Stage 3 Tour Down Under, Pello Bilbao
Stage 2 Saudi Tour, Jonathan Milan
Points classification Giro d'Italia, Jonathan Milan

Stage 2, Jonathan Milan
Stage 19, Santiago Buitrago

Stage 5 Tour of Slovenia, Matej Mohorič
Croatia National Time Trial Championships, Fran Miholjević
Serbia National Road Race Championships, Dušan Rajović
United Kingdom National Road Race Championships, Fred Wright
Stage 10 Tour de France, Pello Bilbao
Stage 15 Tour de France, Wout Poels
Stage 19 Tour de France, Matej Mohorič
Overall Tour de Pologne, Matej Mohorič

Stage 2, Matej Mohorič

Stage 5 Renewi Tour, Matej Mohorič

== 2024 – Team Bahrain Victorious ==
Stage 2 Volta a la Comunitat Valenciana, Matej Mohorič
Stage 2 Tour of Antalya, Matevž Govekar
Stage 4 Paris–Nice, Santiago Buitrago
Stage 3 Tirreno–Adriatico, Phil Bauhaus
Stage 5 Tour de Hongrie, Wout Poels
Stage 4 Tour de Suisse, Torstein Træen
Stage 2 Tour of Slovenia, Phil Bauhaus
Stage 4 Tour of Slovenia, Pello Bilbao
Slovenia National Time Trial Championships, Matej Mohorič
Serbia National Time Trial Championships, Dušan Rajović

== 2025 – Team Bahrain Victorious ==
Overall Volta a la Comunitat Valenciana, Santiago Buitrago

Stages 2 & 4, Santiago Buitrago

== 2026 – Team Bahrain Victorious ==
1st Trofeo Laigueglia, Santiago Buitrago
1st Grand Prix de Denain, Alec Segaert

== Supplementary statistics ==
Grand Tours by highest finishing position
| Race | 2017 | 2018 | 2019 | 2020 | 2021 | 2022 | 2023 | 2024 | 2025 | 2026 |
| Giro d'Italia | 3 | 5 | 2 | 5 | 2 | 3 | 4 | 5 | 5 | 6 |
| Tour de France | 45 | 18 | 39 | 4 | 9 | 14 | 6 | 10 | 40 | 5 |
| Vuelta a España | 2 | 9 | 12 | 6 | 3 | 15 | 5 | 22 | 15 | |
Major week-long stage races by highest finishing position
| Race | 2017 | 2018 | 2019 | 2020 | 2021 | 2022 | 2023 | 2024 | 2025 | 2026 |
| Tour Down Under | 20 | 7 | 5 | 10 | NH | | 3 | 10 | 15 | 18 |
| UAE Tour | Race did not Exist | | 35 | 21 | 7 | 3 | 4 | 3 | 3 | 2 |
| Paris–Nice | 7 | 3 | 17 | – | 7 | 6 | 5 | 23 | 24 | 5 |
| Tirreno–Adriatico | 25 | 11 | 15 | 20 | 3 | 3 | 7 | 11 | 3 | 7 |
| Volta a Catalunya | 17 | 20 | 14 | NH | 18 | 12 | 5 | 8 | 5 | 2 |
| Tour of the Basque Country | 3 | 3 | 24 | NH | 6 | 5 | 2 | 6 | 13 | 6 |
| Tour of the Alps | – | 2 | 3 | NH | 2 | 4 | 3 | 3 | 6 | 6 |
| Tour de Romandie | 5 | 11 | 35 | NH | 9 | 2 | 3 | 37 | 2 | 3 |
| Critérium du Dauphiné | 24 | 24 | 6 | 18 | 5 | 4 | 5 | 11 | 25 | 59 |
| Tour de Suisse | 6 | 15 | 2 | NH | 18 | DNF (Note: The team did not start Stage 6 due to a positive Covid test.) | DNF (Note: Following the death of Gino Mäder the team pulled out before stage 7 of the race.) | 16 | 13 | 29 |
| Tour de Pologne | 9 | 11 | 12 | 35 | 2 | 3 | 1 | 6 | 2 | 6 |
| Benelux Tour | 29 | 1 | 7 | 6 | 1 | NH (Note: The race was cancelled due to an overcrowded calendar.) | 7 | 8 | 4 | 6 |
Monument races by highest finishing position
| Monument | 2017 | 2018 | 2019 | 2020 | 2021 | 2022 | 2023 | 2024 | 2025 | 2026 |
| Milan–San Remo | 13 | 1 | 5 | 10 | 8 | 1 | 8 | 6 | 10 | 10 |
| Tour of Flanders | 10 | 23 | 24 | 11 | 20 | 6 | 8 | 50 | 21 | 8 |
| Paris–Roubaix | 89 | 20 | 14 | NH | 1 | 5 | 29 | 12 | 9 | 16 |
| Liège–Bastogne–Liège | 5 | 5 | 8 | 4 | 10 | 6 | 3 | 9 | 29 | 6 |
| Giro di Lombardia | 1 | 2 | 49 | 37 | 37 | 3 | 21 | 22 | 12 | |
Classics by highest finishing position
| Classic | 2017 | 2018 | 2019 | 2020 | 2021 | 2022 | 2023 | 2024 | 2025 | 2026 |
| Cadel Evans Great Ocean Road Race | – | – | – | 8 | NH (Note: Not held due to the COVID-19 pandemic.) | | – | – | – | 18 |
| Omloop Het Nieuwsblad | 35 | 8 | 5 | 18 | 4 | 2 | 8 | 24 | 39 | 39 |
| Kuurne–Brussels–Kuurne | 52 | 3 | 13 | 7 | 6 | 13 | 3 | 21 | 18 | 4 |
| Strade Bianche | 18 | 5 | 31 | 19 | 10 | 5 | 6 | 5 | 5 | 18 |
| E3 Harelbeke | 7 | 19 | 13 | NH | 10 | 4 | 7 | 15 | 35 | 23 |
| Gent–Wevelgem | 13 | 49 | 9 | 10 | 4 | 9 | 19 | 13 | 56 | 32 |
| Amstel Gold Race | 7 | 3 | 38 | NH | 9 | 10 | 22 | 9 | 25 | 15 |
| La Flèche Wallonne | 12 | 27 | 14 | 16 | 19 | 1 | 3 | 5 | 4 | 8 |
| Clásica de San Sebastián | 24 | 7 | 18 | NH | 2 | 29 | 2 | 30 | 40 | 5 |

Legend
| — | Did not compete |
| DNF | Did not finish |
| DNS | Did not start |
| NH | Not held |
