= Pello Bilbao =

Spanish racing cyclist

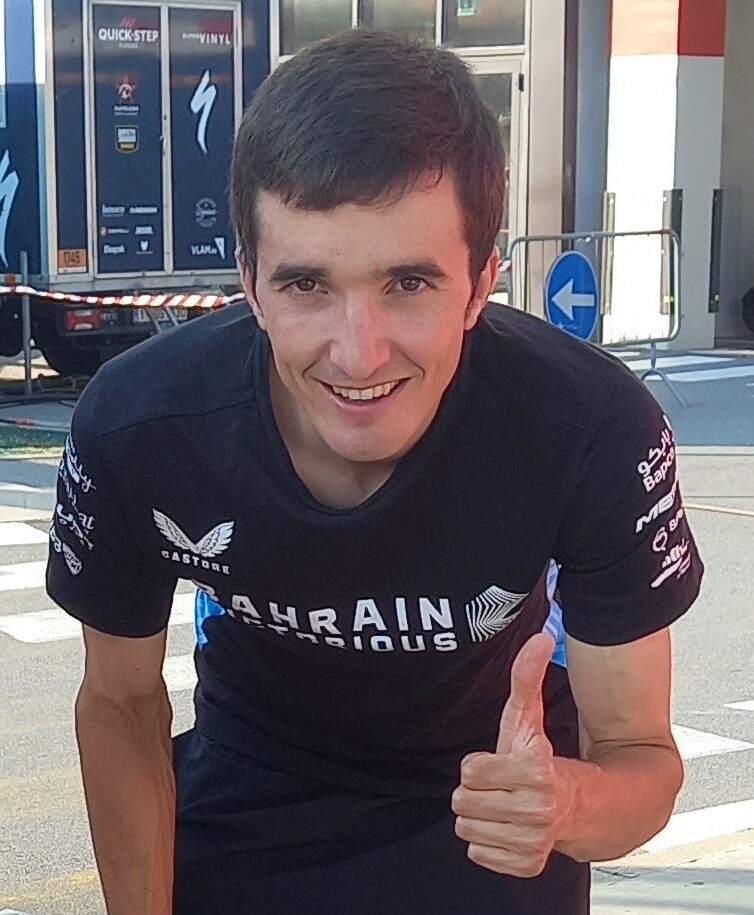
- Bilbao in 2022

Personal information
- Full name: Pello Bilbao López de Armentia
- Nickname: The Puppy of Guernica
- Born: 25 February 1990 (age 36) Guernica, Spain
- Height: 1.69 m (5 ft 6 1/2 in)
- Weight: 60 kg (132 lb; 9 st 6 lb)

Cycling career
- Sport: Cycling
- Current team: Team Bahrain Victorious
- Discipline: Road
- Role: Rider
- Rider type: All-rounder

Amateur team
- 2009–2010: Naturgas Energía

Professional teams
- 2011: Orbea
- 2011–2013: Euskaltel–Euskadi
- 2014–2016: Caja Rural–Seguros RGA
- 2017–2019: Astana
- 2020–: Bahrain–McLaren

Major wins
- Grand Tours Tour de France 1 individual stage (2023) Giro d'Italia 2 individual stages (2019) One-day races and Classics National Time Trial Championships (2020)

Pello Bilbao López de Armentia (born 25 February 1990) is a Spanish cyclist who currently rides for UCI WorldTeam Team Bahrain Victorious. He has finished in the top ten five times in Grand Tours — twice in the Tour de France (2021, 2023); and three times in the Giro d'Italia (2018, 2020, 2022).

== Career ==
=== Caja Rural–Seguros RGA (2014–16) ===
Bilbao joined Caja Rural–Seguros RGA for the 2014 season, after his previous team – Euskaltel–Euskadi – folded at the end of the 2013 season. In 2015, Bilbao won the sixth stage of the Tour of Turkey, concluding his effort atop a steep climb.

=== Astana (2017–2019) ===
He was named in the start list for the 2017 Giro d'Italia. He finished 10th overall in the Tour de Suisse, which was his first general classification top 10 in a major stage race.

Bilbao finished 7th overall at the 2018 Volta a la Comunitat Valenciana. Months later he finished 8th overall at the Tour of the Basque Country. He won stage 1 of the Tour of the Alps, therefore riding stage 2 in the leader's jersey. He continued this form at the Giro d'Italia, supporting Miguel Ángel López, and finishing 6th overall. He took his first World Tour victory on stage 6 of the Critérium du Dauphiné.

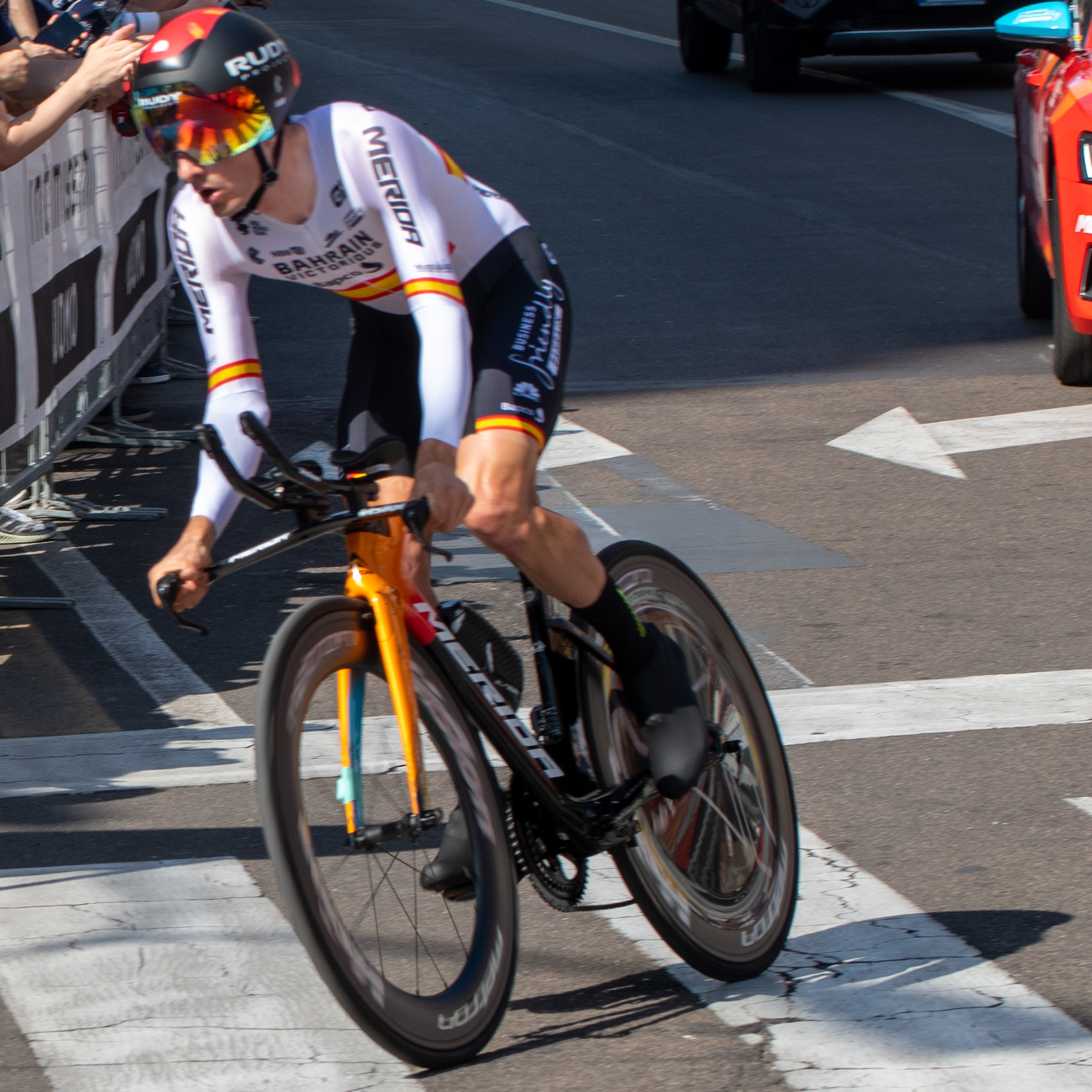
Bilbao at the 2021 Giro d'Italia

In July 2019, he was named in the startlist for the Tour de France.

=== Bahrain–McLaren (2020–present) ===
In October 2019, it was announced that Bilbao was joining Bahrain–Merida, later renamed as Bahrain–McLaren for the 2020 season. He finished sixteenth at the 2020 Tour de France, before recording his best Grand Tour result to that point, placing fifth overall at the 2020 Giro d'Italia. He entered the 2021 Giro d'Italia as a domestique – initially for team leader Mikel Landa, before Landa had to withdraw from the race after a crash on the fifth stage. Damiano Caruso then took over as team leader, and following teamwork by Bilbao won the penultimate stage of the race on his way to second overall; Bilbao finished 13th overall.

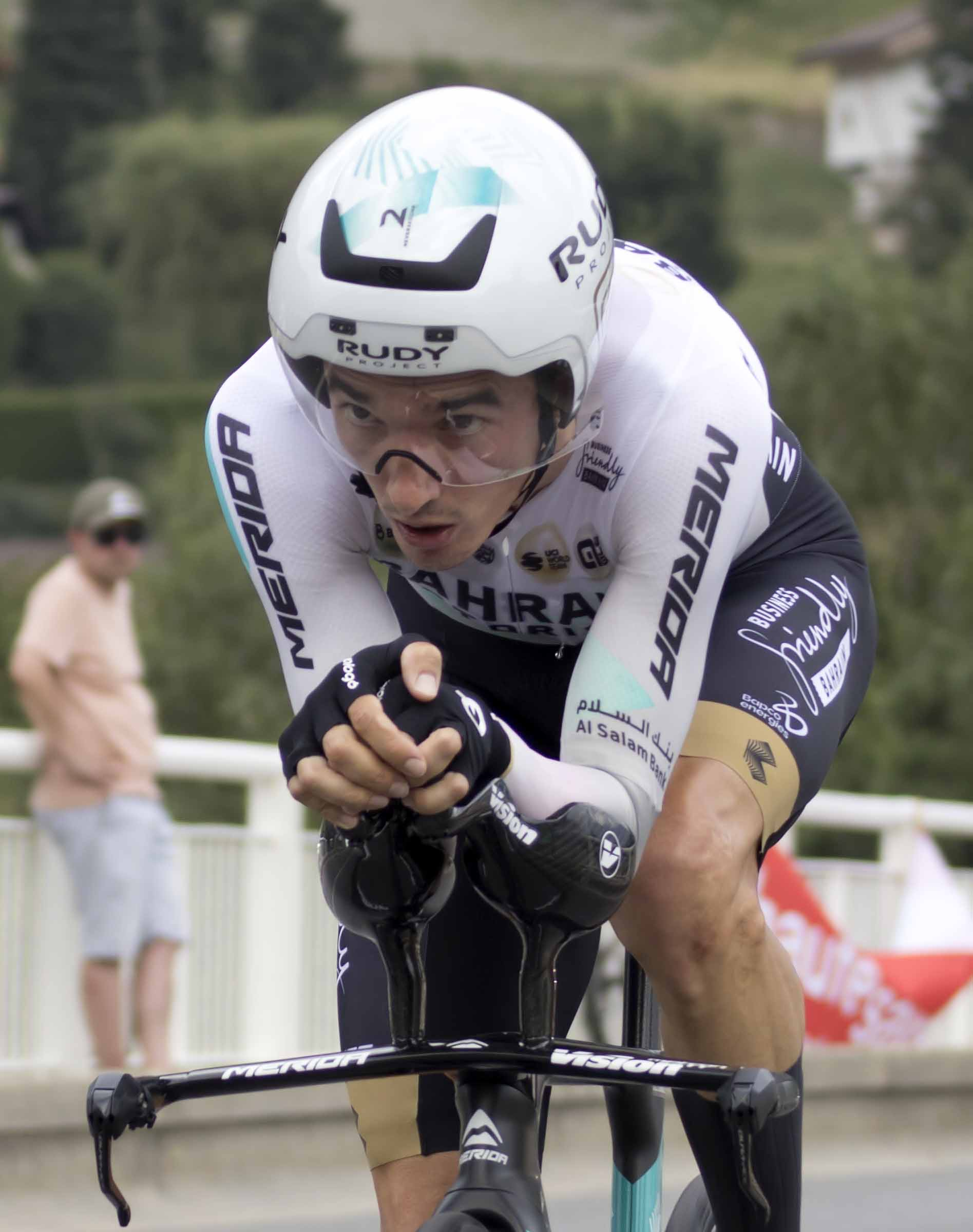
Bilbao at the 2023 Tour de France

Bilbao finished on the overall podium at the 2022 UAE Tour, taking a third-place stage finish at Jebel Hafeet on the final day. At the Tour of the Basque Country, Bilbao won a small group sprint on the third stage into Amurrio; he finished the race in fifth overall. His next start was at the Tour of the Alps, where he again won a small group sprint, winning the second stage into Lana. Having finished second on the first stage, Bilbao assumed the race lead – which he would hold until the final day, when he lost forty seconds to three riders who moved ahead of him in the general classification. At the Giro d'Italia, Bilbao finished in third place on the opening stage in Hungary, behind Mathieu van der Poel and Biniam Girmay. Bilbao held a top-ten position in the general classification for the duration of the race, finishing fifth overall for the second time in three editions.

Bilbao took an early season win on stage three of the 2023 Tour Down Under, going on to finish third overall. In July he won his first Tour de France stage on stage 10 from the breakaway. He dedicated his victory to teammate Gino Mäder following his death at the Tour de Suisse earlier that year.

Bilbao is taking part in the 2024 Tour de France.

== Major results ==
2011
2nd Tour de Vendée
7th Prueba Villafranca de Ordizia
2012
10th Overall Vuelta a Asturias
2013
7th Overall Vuelta a Asturias
2014 (1 pro win)
1st Klasika Primavera
3rd Circuito de Getxo
6th Overall Vuelta a Burgos
7th Overall Tour of Norway
7th Overall Tour du Gévaudan Languedoc-Roussillon
8th Grand Prix d'Ouverture La Marseillaise
2015 (2)
1st Overall Tour de Beauce
1st Mountains classification, Vuelta a Andalucía
1st Stage 6 Tour of Turkey
4th Overall Vuelta a Castilla y León

1st Points classification
1st Stage 1

7th Overall Tour du Gévaudan Languedoc-Roussillon
10th GP Miguel Induráin
2016 (1)
1st Stage 2 Tour of Turkey
2nd Overall Vuelta a Castilla y León
5th Circuito de Getxo
6th GP Miguel Induráin
7th Milano–Torino
8th Klasika Primavera
9th Overall Tour of Norway
9th Prueba Villafranca de Ordizia
2017
10th Overall Tour de Suisse
2018 (2)
1st Stage 6 Critérium du Dauphiné
1st Stage 1 Tour of the Alps
6th Overall Giro d'Italia
7th Overall Volta a la Comunitat Valenciana
8th Overall Tour of the Basque Country
2019 (3)
Giro d'Italia

1st Stages 7 & 20

2nd Time trial, National Road Championships
3rd Overall Vuelta a Murcia

1st Stage 1

3rd Overall Volta a la Comunitat Valenciana
4th Overall Vuelta a Andalucía
2020 (1)
1st Time trial, National Road Championships
5th Overall Giro d'Italia
6th Overall Vuelta a Andalucía
6th Circuito de Getxo
2021 (1)
2nd Overall Tour of the Alps

1st Stage 4

4th GP Miguel Induráin
5th Time trial, National Road Championships
6th Overall Tour of the Basque Country
9th Overall Tour de France
10th Strade Bianche
2022 (3)
2nd Overall Deutschland Tour

1st Points classification
1st Stage 4

3rd Overall Tour de Pologne
3rd Overall UAE Tour
4th Overall Tour of the Alps

1st Stage 2

5th Overall Giro d'Italia
5th Overall Tour of the Basque Country

1st Stage 3

5th Strade Bianche
9th Overall Tirreno–Adriatico
9th Grand Prix Cycliste de Montréal
2023 (2)
2nd Clásica de San Sebastián
3rd Overall Tour Down Under

1st Stage 3

4th Overall UAE Tour
4th Overall Volta a la Comunitat Valenciana
6th Overall Tour de France

1st Stage 10

7th Strade Bianche
2024 (1)
2nd Overall Tour of Slovenia

1st Stage 4

2nd Grand Prix Cycliste de Montréal
3rd Overall UAE Tour
6th Overall Tour of the Basque Country
6th Overall Volta a la Comunitat Valenciana
9th Liège–Bastogne–Liège
9th Amstel Gold Race
9th Grand Prix Cycliste de Québec
2025
3rd Overall UAE Tour
3rd Overall Volta a la Comunitat Valenciana
5th Strade Bianche
8th Overall Tour of Guangxi
9th Overall Tirreno–Adriatico
9th Overall Tour de Pologne
9th Overall Tour of Britain
2026
4th Eschborn–Frankfurt
5th Clásica de San Sebastián
6th Overall Tour of the Basque Country
6th Liège–Bastogne–Liège
6th Tre Valli Varesine
6th Clásica Jaén Paraíso Interior
7th Giro di Lombardia

=== General classification results timeline ===
Grand Tour general classification results
Grand Tour	2011	2012	2013	2014	2015	2016	2017	2018	2019	2020	2021	2022	2023	2024	2025	2026
Giro d'Italia	—	—	—	—	—	—	66	6	31	5	13	5	—	—	30	—
Tour de France	—	—	—	—	—	—	—	—	54	16	9	—	6	DNF	—	—
Vuelta a España	—	—	—	60	97	78	23	27	—	—	—	—	—	—	—	33
Major stage race general classification results
Race	2011	2012	2013	2014	2015	2016	2017	2018	2019	2020	2021	2022	2023	2024	2025	2026
Paris–Nice	—	DNF	—	—	—	—	—	—	—	DNF	—	—	—	23	—	—
Tirreno–Adriatico	—	—	—	—	—	89	—	—	—	—	61	9	—	—	9	24
Volta a Catalunya	—	—	—	—	—	—	DNF	48	28	NH	—	—	—	—	—	—
Tour of the Basque Country	—	—	—	—	56	17	110	8	53	NH	6	5	DNF	6	83	6
Tour de Romandie	—	—	103	—	—	—	24	—	—	NH	—	—	—	—	—	—
Critérium du Dauphiné	92	146	73	—	—	—	—	27	—	33	—	—	—	—	—	64
Tour de Suisse	—	—	—	—	—	—	10	—	—	NH	—	—	DNF	—	57	—

=== Classics results timeline ===
Monument	2011	2012	2013	2014	2015	2016	2017	2018	2019	2020	2021	2022	2023	2024	2025	2026
Milan–San Remo	—	—	—	—	—	—	—	—	—	—	—	—	43	—	—	—
Tour of Flanders	—	90	DNF	—	—	—	—	—	—	—	—	—	—	—	—	—
Paris–Roubaix	—	—	DNF	—	—	—	—	—	—	—	—	—	—	—	—	—
Liège–Bastogne–Liège	—	—	—	—	—	—	58	—	—	—	—	—	43	9	29	6
Giro di Lombardia	—	54	—	—	—	—	29	—	—	—	—	—	—	—	68	7
Classic	2011	2012	2013	2014	2015	2016	2017	2018	2019	2020	2021	2022	2023	2024	2025	2026
Strade Bianche	—	—	—	—	—	—	—	—	—	—	10	5	7	—	5	18
Amstel Gold Race	—	137	—	—	—	—	—	—	—	—	—	—	—	9	25	15
La Flèche Wallonne	—	44	—	—	—	—	57	—	—	—	—	—	91	DNF	57	18
Eschborn–Frankfurt	—	—	—	—	—	—	—	—	—	—	—	—	—	—	—	4
Clásica de San Sebastián	—	—	—	38	93	46	DNF	18	19	NH	—	—	2	—	DNF	5
Grand Prix Cycliste de Québec	—	DNF	DNF	—	—	—	—	—	64	Not held		12	80	9	22	—
Grand Prix Cycliste de Montréal	—	39	38	—	—	—	—	—	DNF	Not held		9	29	2	28	—
Milano–Torino	—	—	—	—	—	7	15	—	—	—	—	—	—	—	—	—
Tre Valli Varesine	—	—	—	—	—	30	—	—	—	—	—	—	—	—	—	6

Legend
—	Did not compete
DNF	Did not finish
IP	In progress
NH	Not held
