= 2026 UCI World Tour =

Road cycling competitions

- Sixteenth edition of the UCI WorldTour

Details
- Dates: 20 January – 18 October
- Location: Australia; Canada; China; Europe; United Arab Emirates
- Races: 36

The 2026 UCI World Tour was a series of races that included thirty-six events throughout the 2026 men's cycling season. The tour started with the Tour Down Under on 20 January, and concluded with the Tour of Guangxi on 18 October.

At the end of the season, Slovenian rider Tadej Pogačar (UAE Team Emirates XRG) led the overall road world rankings for the sixth year in a row, having won seven World Tour events during the season, including the Tour de France. Second was Belgian rider Remco Evenepoel (Red Bull–Bora–Hansgrohe) and third was Mexican rider Isaac del Toro (UAE Team Emirates XRG).

== Events ==
The race calendar for the 2026 season was announced in June 2025, with thirty-six races scheduled. The calendar was similar to 2025.

Races in the 2026 UCI World Tour
Race	Date	Winner	Second	Third
(Australia) Tour Down Under	20–25 January	Jay Vine (AUS)	Mauro Schmid (SUI)	Harry Sweeny (AUS)
(Australia) Cadel Evans Great Ocean Road Race	1 February	Tobias Lund Andresen (DEN)	Matthew Brennan (GBR)	Brady Gilmore (AUS)
(United Arab Emirates) UAE Tour	16–22 February	Isaac del Toro (MEX)	Antonio Tiberi (ITA)	Luke Plapp (AUS)
(Belgium) Omloop Het Nieuwsblad	28 February	Mathieu van der Poel (NED)	Tim van Dijke (NED)	Florian Vermeersch (BEL)
(Italy) Strade Bianche	7 March	Tadej Pogačar (SLO)	Paul Seixas (FRA)	Isaac del Toro (MEX)
(France) Paris–Nice	8–15 March	Jonas Vingegaard (DEN)	Daniel Martínez (COL)	Georg Steinhauser (GER)
(Italy) Tirreno–Adriatico	9–15 March	Isaac del Toro (MEX)	Matteo Jorgenson (USA)	Giulio Pellizzari (ITA)
(Italy) Milan–San Remo	21 March	Tadej Pogačar (SLO)	Tom Pidcock (GBR)	Wout van Aert (BEL)
(Spain) Volta a Catalunya	23–29 March	Jonas Vingegaard (DEN)	Lenny Martinez (FRA)	Florian Lipowitz (GER)
(Belgium) Tour of Bruges	25 March	Dylan Groenewegen (NED)	Jasper Philipsen (BEL)	Max Kanter (GER)
(Belgium) E3 Saxo Classic	27 March	Mathieu van der Poel (NED)	Per Strand Hagenes (NOR)	Florian Vermeersch (BEL)
(Belgium) Gent–Wevelgem	29 March	Jasper Philipsen (BEL)	Tobias Lund Andresen (DEN)	Christophe Laporte (FRA)
(Belgium) Dwars door Vlaanderen	1 April	Filippo Ganna (ITA)	Wout van Aert (BEL)	Søren Wærenskjold (NOR)
(Belgium) Tour of Flanders	5 April	Tadej Pogačar (SLO)	Mathieu van der Poel (NED)	Remco Evenepoel (BEL)
(Spain) Tour of the Basque Country	6–11 April	Paul Seixas (FRA)	Florian Lipowitz (GER)	Tobias Halland Johannessen (NOR)
(France) Paris–Roubaix	12 April	Wout van Aert (BEL)	Tadej Pogačar (SLO)	Jasper Stuyven (BEL)
(Netherlands) Amstel Gold Race	19 April	Remco Evenepoel (BEL)	Mattias Skjelmose (DEN)	Benoît Cosnefroy (FRA)
(Belgium) La Flèche Wallonne	22 April	Paul Seixas (FRA)	Mauro Schmid (SUI)	Ben Tulett (GBR)
(Belgium) Liège–Bastogne–Liège	26 April	Tadej Pogačar (SLO)	Paul Seixas (FRA)	Remco Evenepoel (BEL)
(Switzerland) Tour de Romandie	28 April – 3 May	Tadej Pogačar (SLO)	Florian Lipowitz (GER)	Lenny Martinez (FRA)
(Germany) Eschborn–Frankfurt	1 May	Georg Zimmermann (GER)	Tom Pidcock (GBR)	Ben Tulett (GBR)
(Italy) Giro d'Italia	8–31 May	Jonas Vingegaard (DEN)	Felix Gall (AUT)	Jai Hindley (AUS)
(France) Tour Auvergne-Rhône-Alpes	7–14 June	Isaac del Toro (MEX)	Luke Tuckwell (AUS)	Juan Ayuso (ESP)
(Denmark) Copenhagen Sprint	14 June	Jasper Philipsen (BEL)	Tobias Lund Andresen (DEN)	Sam Welsford (AUS)
(Switzerland) Tour de Suisse	17–21 June	Tadej Pogačar (SLO)	Richard Carapaz (ECU)	Mathias Vacek (CZE)
Tour de France	4–26 July	Tadej Pogačar (SLO)	Remco Evenepoel (BEL)	Isaac del Toro (MEX)
(Spain) Clásica de San Sebastián	1 August	Remco Evenepoel (BEL)	Richard Carapaz (ECU)	Ben Tulett (GBR)
(Poland) Tour de Pologne	3–9 August	Marco Brenner (GER)	Finn Fisher-Black (NZL)	Iván Romeo (ESP)
(Germany) Hamburg Cyclassics	16 August	Paul Magnier (FRA)	Mike Teunissen (NED)	Laurence Pithie (NZL)
(Belgium) / (Netherlands) Renewi Tour	19–23 August	Jasper Philipsen (BEL)	Jenno Berckmoes (BEL)	Olav Kooij (NED)
(Spain) Vuelta a España	22 August – 13 September	Enric Mas (ESP)	Primož Roglič (SLO)	Felix Gall (AUT)
(France) Bretagne Classic	30 August	Alex Aranburu (ESP)	Alexander Kamp (DEN)	Alessandro Borgo (ITA)
(Canada) Grand Prix Cycliste de Québec	11 September	Remco Evenepoel (BEL)	Giulio Ciccone (ITA)	Anthon Charmig (DEN)
(Canada) Grand Prix Cycliste de Montréal	13 September	Isaac del Toro (MEX)	Paul Seixas (FRA)	Brandon McNulty (USA)
(Italy) Il Lombardia	10 October	Paul Seixas (FRA)	Enric Mas (ESP)	Giulio Ciccone (ITA)
(China) Tour of Guangxi	13–18 October	Jarno Widar (BEL)	Tom Pidcock (GBR)	Louis Barré (FRA)

== Teams ==
The eighteen WorldTeams were automatically invited to compete in events based on the results of the previous three year ranking (from 2023–2025).

- Alpecin–Premier Tech
- Decathlon CMA CGM
- EF Education–EasyPost
- Groupama–FDJ United
- Lidl–Trek
- Lotto–Intermarché
- Movistar Team
- Netcompany INEOS
- NSN Cycling Team
- Red Bull–Bora–Hansgrohe
- Soudal–Quick-Step
- Team Bahrain Victorious
- Team Jayco–AlUla
- Team Picnic–PostNL
- UAE Team Emirates XRG
- Uno-X Mobility
- Visma–Lease a Bike
- XDS Astana Team

Additionally, three ProTeams were invited to all the UCI World Tour races based on the ranking of the 2025 season.

- Cofidis
- Pinarello–Q36.5 Pro Cycling Team
- Tudor Pro Cycling Team
