= Romain Grégoire =

French cyclist (born 2003)

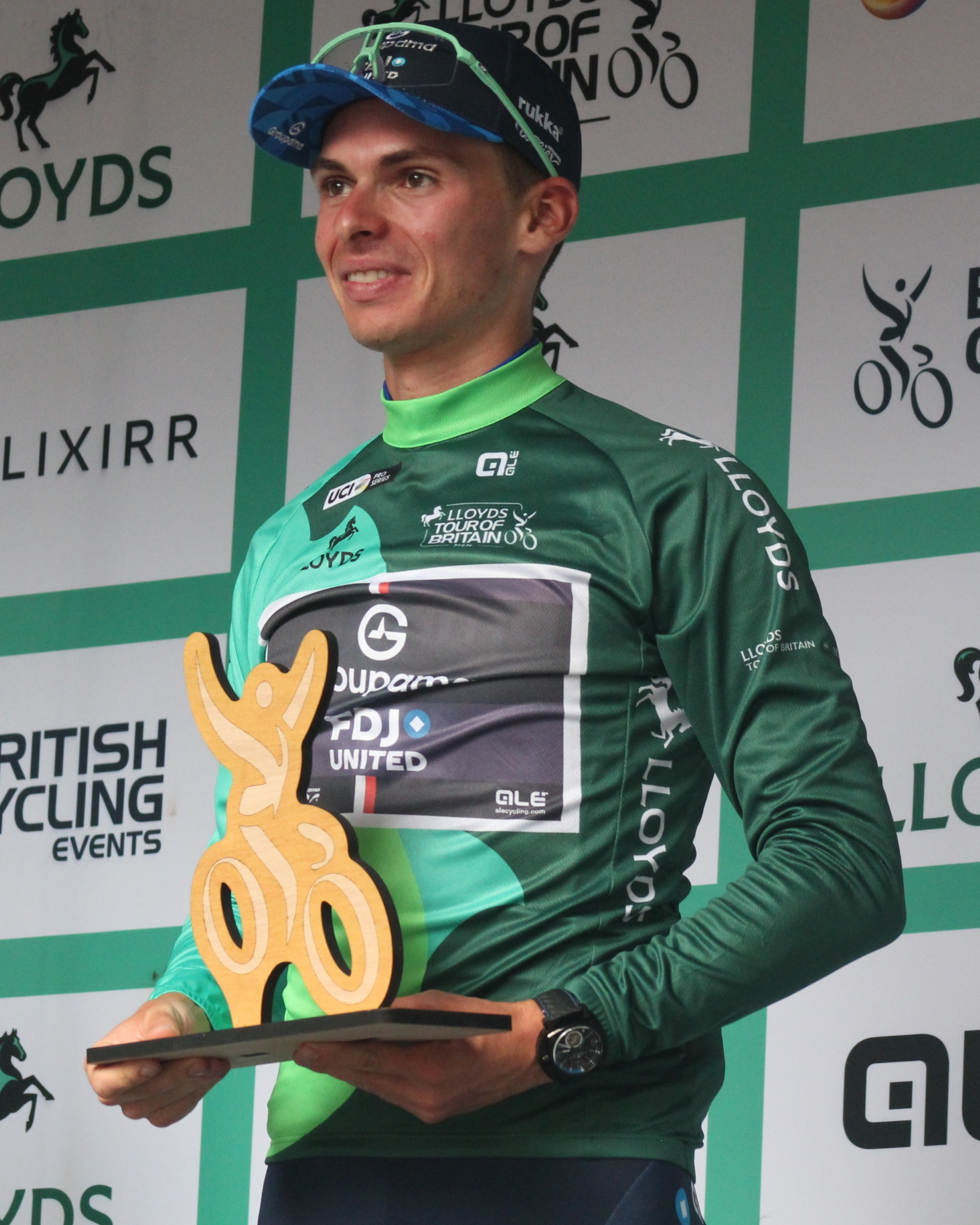
- Grégoire as winner of the 2025 Tour of Britain

Personal information
- Born: 21 January 2003 (age 23) Besançon, France
- Height: 1.77 m (5 ft 10 in)
- Weight: 64 kg (141 lb)

Cycling career
- Sport: Cycling
- Current team: Groupama–FDJ United
- Disciplines: Road; Cyclo-cross
- Role: Rider
- Rider type: Puncheur

Amateur team
- 2020–2021: AC Bisontine

Professional teams
- 2022: Équipe Continentale Groupama–FDJ
- 2023–: Groupama–FDJ

Major wins
- Stage races Four Days of Dunkirk (2023) Tour of Britain (2025) One-day races and Classics National Road Race Championships (2026) Ardèche Classic (2025) La Drôme Classic (2026)
Medal record
Road cycling
Representing France
World Championships
Silver medal – second place	2021 Flanders	Junior road race
European Championships
Gold medal – first place	2021 Trentino	Junior road race

Romain Grégoire (born 21 January 2003) is a French road cyclist, who currently rides for UCI WorldTeam Groupama–FDJ United.

== Career ==
Grégoire had a successful junior career, being crowned both the national and European junior road race champion. He also won the silver medal in the road race at the 2021 UCI World Junior Championships. He also competed in cyclo-cross until 2022, winning the 2022 national under-23 championships.

In 2022, Grégoire joined UCI Continental team Équipe Continentale Groupama–FDJ for his first year in the under-23 category. He took six UCI victories that season, including the Liège–Bastogne–Liège Espoirs, the G.P. Palio del Recioto, the Flèche Ardennaise and a stage of the Tour de l'Avenir.

In 2023 he was promoted to the World Tour squad, taking five professional wins, including the overall wins of the Four Days of Dunkirk and the Tour du Limousin. he also finished eighth in his first UCI WorldTour event: Strade Bianche. In August, he entered his first Grand Tour: the Vuelta a España, where he finished second on stage 11 from the breakaway.

In April 2024, he won the fifth stage of the Tour of the Basque Country.

== Major results ==
=== Road ===
2020
1st Road race, National Junior Championships
2nd Overall La Philippe Gilbert Juniors
2021
1st Road race, UEC European Junior Championships
National Junior Championships

1st Road race
1st Time trial

1st Overall Ain Bugey Valromey Tour

1st Stage 5

1st Trofeo Guido Dorigo
1st Gran Premio Eccellenze Valli del Soligo
2nd Road race, UCI World Junior Championships
4th Overall Driedaagse van Axel

1st Stage 3

4th Overall Course de la Paix Juniors
5th Overall Aubel–Thimister–Stavelot

1st Stage 3

5th Paris–Roubaix Juniors
2022
1st Liège–Bastogne–Liège Espoirs
1st G.P. Palio del Recioto
1st Giro del Belvedere
1st Flèche Ardennaise
Giro Ciclistico d'Italia

1st Points classification
1st Stage 7

1st Stage 6 Tour de l'Avenir
National Under-23 Championships

2nd Time trial
3rd Road race

2nd Overall Alpes Isère Tour

1st Young rider classification

2023 (5 pro wins)
1st Overall Four Days of Dunkirk

1st Young rider classification
1st Stage 2

1st Overall Tour du Limousin

1st Young rider classification
1st Stages 1 & 3

2nd Grand Prix du Morbihan
5th Ardèche Classic
6th Trofeo Laigueglia
8th Strade Bianche
9th Boucles de l'Aulne
10th Tour du Finistère
2024 (1)
1st Stage 5 Tour of the Basque Country
2nd Ardèche Classic
2nd Veneto Classic
2nd Coppa Agostoni
3rd Giro del Veneto
4th Overall Tour de Pologne
7th Overall Tour des Alpes-Maritimes
7th La Flèche Wallonne
10th Classic Var
Combativity award Stage 17 Tour de France
2025 (6)
1st Overall Tour of Britain

1st Young rider classification
1st Stage 4

1st Ardèche Classic
Tour de Luxembourg

1st Points classification
1st Stages 1 & 5

1st Stage 1 Tour de Suisse
2nd Road race, National Championships
4th Overall Volta ao Algarve

1st Young rider classification

7th Amstel Gold Race
7th La Flèche Wallonne
10th Road race, UEC European Championships
2026 (3)
1st Road race, National Championships
1st La Drôme Classic
1st Stage 2 Tour de Suisse
2nd Grand Prix de Wallonie
2nd Trofeo Laigueglia
3rd Coppa Sabatini
4th Strade Bianche
4th Amstel Gold Race
4th Brabantse Pijl
5th Overall Vuelta a Andalucía
7th Liège–Bastogne–Liège
7th Bretagne Classic
9th La Flèche Wallonne
10th GP Industria & Artigianato di Larciano

==== Grand Tour general classification results timeline ====
Grand Tour	2023	2024	2025	2026
Giro d'Italia	—	—	—	—
Tour de France	—	41	34	57
Vuelta a España	42	—	—	—

==== Classics results timeline ====
Monument	2023	2024	2025	2026
Milan–San Remo	—	—	30	18
Tour of Flanders	—	—	—	22
Paris–Roubaix	—	—	—	—
Liège–Bastogne–Liège	—	24	19	7
Giro di Lombardia	91	32	83	
Classic	2023	2024	2025	2026
Strade Bianche	8	39	52	4
Brabantse Pijl	—	—	—	4
Amstel Gold Race	DNF	12	7	4
La Flèche Wallonne	—	7	7	9
Bretagne Classic	—	37	19	7
Grand Prix Cycliste de Québec	—	19	—	
Grand Prix Cycliste de Montréal	—	29	—	

Legend
—	Did not compete
DNF	Did not finish

=== Cyclo-cross ===
2019–2020
Junior EKZ CrossTour

1st Hittnau
3rd Meilen

3rd Junior Madiswil
2020–2021
2nd Junior Steinmaur
2021–2022
1st National Under-23 Championships
