= Ben Tulett =

British cyclist

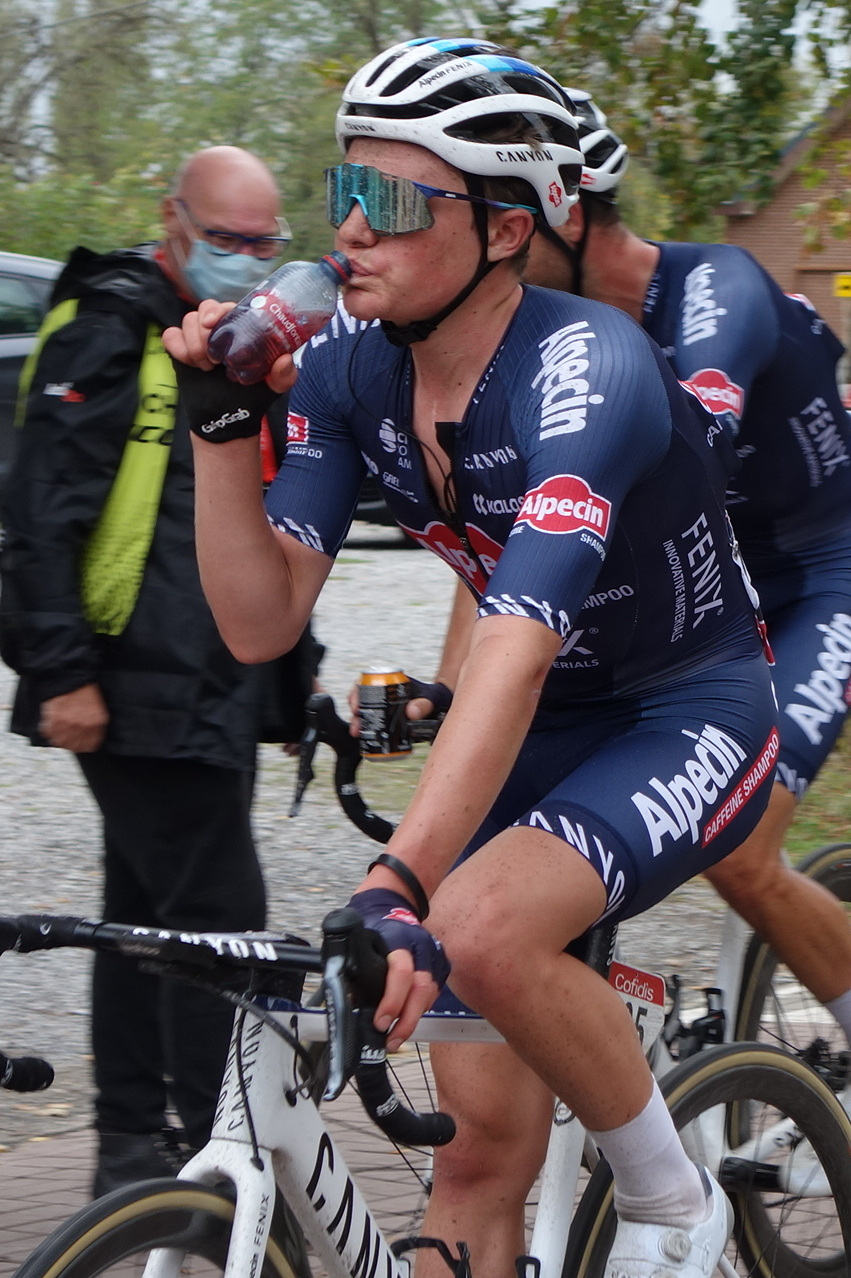
- Ben Tulett at the 2020 La Flèche Wallonne

Personal information
- Full name: Ben Samuel Tulett
- Born: 26 August 2001 (age 25) Sevenoaks, England
- Height: 1.69 m (5 ft 7 in)
- Weight: 56 kg (123 lb)

Cycling career
- Sport: Cycling
- Current team: Visma–Lease a Bike
- Disciplines: Cyclo-cross; Road
- Role: Rider
- Rider type: Puncheur

Amateur team
- 2019: Willebrord Wil Vooruit

Professional teams
- 2019–2021: Corendon–Circus
- 2022–2023: INEOS Grenadiers
- 2024–: Visma–Lease a Bike

Major wins
- Stage races Tour of Norway (2023)
Medal record
Representing Great Britain
Men's cyclo-cross
World Championships
Gold medal – first place	2018 Valkenburg	Junior
Gold medal – first place	2019 Bogense	Junior

Ben Samuel Tulett (born 26 August 2001) is a British cyclo-cross and road cyclist, who currently rides for UCI WorldTeam Visma–Lease a Bike.

== Career ==
=== Early career ===
In 2018, he won the Junior World Cyclo-cross Championships in Valkenburg and repeated the feat 12 months later in Bogense. In 2018, he also won the British junior road race championships.

=== Professional career ===
Tulett shifted his focus solely to road racing in 2020, joining UCI ProTeam Alpecin–Fenix. He finished fifth overall in the Tour of Antalya that year, his first race with the team. In October, he became at 19 years old the youngest rider in 100 years to complete Liège–Bastogne–Liège. The following year, he further showed his promise as a classics rider with top 20 finishes at the Amstel Gold Race and the La Flèche Wallonne. In August, he finished ninth overall at the Tour de Pologne.

In 2022, he signed with UCI WorldTeam INEOS Grenadiers, taking his first pro win on stage three of the Settimana Internazionale di Coppi e Bartali in March. He ultimately finished second overall in the race, nine seconds down on winner Eddie Dunbar. The following season, he took his biggest victory yet, winning the first stage and overall title of the Tour of Norway.

He again moved teams in 2024, signing a two-year contract with Visma–Lease a Bike.

== Major results ==
=== Cyclo-cross ===
2017–2018
1st UCI World Junior Championships
1st Junior Overijse
1st Junior Sint-Niklaas
Junior DVV Trophy

1st Koppenberg
3rd Hamme

Junior National Trophy Series

1st Derby
1st Shrewsbury
3rd Abergavenny

2nd National Junior Championships
Junior Brico Cross

2nd Kruibeke

3rd UEC European Junior Championships
UCI Junior World Cup

3rd Namur

2018–2019
1st UCI World Junior Championships
1st National Junior Championships
Junior National Trophy Series

1st Derby

UCI Junior World Cup

2nd Namur

Junior Superprestige

2nd Zonhoven
2nd Diegem

Junior DVV Trophy

2nd Loenhout

2nd Junior Overijse
2019–2020
1st National Under-23 Championships
2nd National Championships

=== Road ===
2018
1st Road race, National Junior Championships
1st Overall Junior Tour of Wales
1st Stage 4 (ITT) Acht van Bladel Juniors
3rd Overall Ronde des Vallées

1st Young rider classification

2019
4th Gent–Wevelgem Junioren
2020
5th Overall Tour of Antalya
2021
8th Coppa Ugo Agostoni
9th Overall Tour de Pologne
2022 (1 pro win)
2nd Overall Settimana Internazionale di Coppi e Bartali

1st Young rider classification
1st Stage 3

5th Overall Tour de Pologne
2023 (2)
1st Overall Tour of Norway

1st Young rider classification
1st Prologue

2nd Overall Tour de Hongrie
6th Clásica Jaén Paraíso Interior
2025 (2)
1st Overall Settimana Internazionale di Coppi e Bartali

1st Stage 4

2nd Milano–Torino
3rd Overall Tour de l'Ain
3rd La Drôme Classic
6th Giro dell'Emilia
9th Clásica Jaén Paraíso Interior
2026
1st Stage 3 (TTT) Tour Auvergne-Rhône-Alpes
3rd La Flèche Wallonne
3rd Clásica de San Sebastián
3rd Eschborn–Frankfurt
4th Giro dell'Emilia
5th Andorra MoraBanc Clàssica

==== Grand Tour general classification results timeline ====
Grand Tour	2022	2023	2024	2025
Giro d'Italia	38	—	—	—
Tour de France	—	—	—	—
Vuelta a España	—	—	—	24

==== Classics results timeline ====
Monument	2020	2021	2022	2023	2024	2025	2026
Milan–San Remo	—	—	—	—	—	16	—
Tour of Flanders	—	—	—	—	—	—	—
Paris–Roubaix	NH	—	—	—	—	—	—
Liège–Bastogne–Liège	53	54	—	—	DNF	20	13
Giro di Lombardia	—	21	DNF	—	—	14	
Classic	2020	2021	2022	2023	2024	2025	2026
Strade Bianche	—	—	—	31	95	61	—
Milano–Torino	—	—	—	—	—	2	—
Brabantse Pijl	—	61	—	—	—	—	—
Amstel Gold Race	NH	17	—	—	—	21	—
La Flèche Wallonne	35	12	—	—	—	19	3
Eschborn–Frankfurt	—	—	—	—	—	—	3
Clásica de San Sebastián	—	—	—	DNF	—	—	3
Giro dell'Emilia	—	—	—	—	—	6	4

Legend
—	Did not compete
DNF	Did not finish
IP	Race in Progress
