= Christian Scaroni =

Italian cyclist (born 1997)

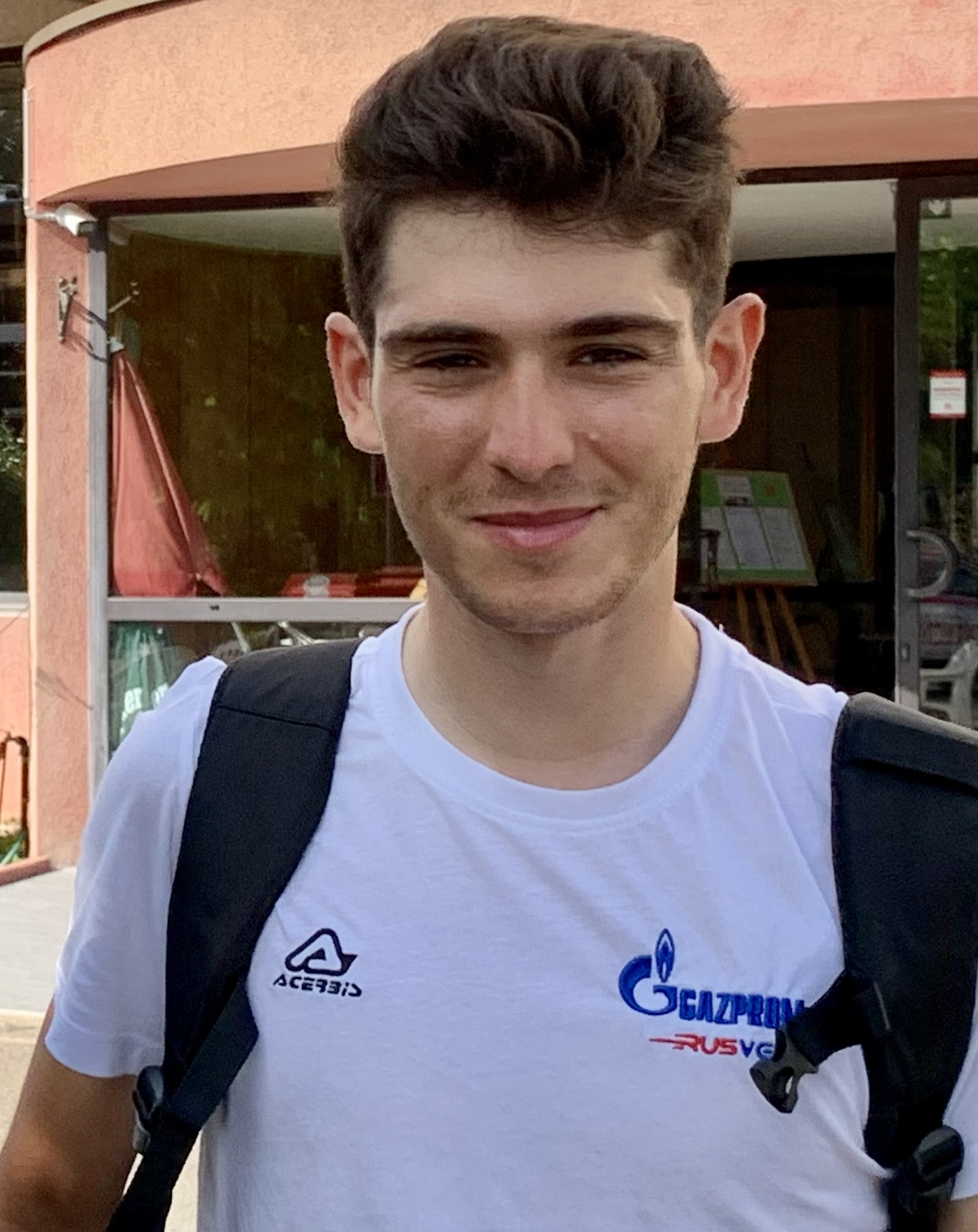

Personal information
- Full name: Christian Scaroni
- Born: 16 October 1997 (age 29) Brescia, Italy
- Height: 1.75 m (5 ft 9 in)
- Weight: 63 kg (139 lb)

Cycling career
- Sport: Cycling
- Current team: XDS Astana Team
- Discipline: Road
- Role: Rider
- Rider type: Puncheur

Amateur teams
- 2016–2017: General Store Bottoli Zardini
- 2018: Petroli Firenze–Maserati–Hopplà
- 2018: Sangemini–MG.K Vis Vega (stagiaire)

Professional teams
- 2019: Équipe Continentale Groupama–FDJ
- 2020–2022: Gazprom–RusVelo
- 2022–: Astana Qazaqstan Team

Major wins
- Grand Tours Giro d’Italia 1 individual stage (2025) Stage races Tour of Oman (2026)

Christian Scaroni (born 16 October 1997) is an Italian cyclist, who currently rides for UCI WorldTeam XDS Astana Team.

== Major results ==
2015
1st Road race, National Junior Road Championships
2018
2nd Giro del Belvedere
3rd Overall Toscana-Terra di Ciclismo
3rd Gran Premio Industrie del Marmo
4th Road race, UEC European Under-23 Road Championships
2019
1st Mountains classification, Tour de Normandie
2nd Overall Tour du Jura Cycliste

1st Young rider classification

2021
1st Mountains classification, Giro di Sicilia
9th Trofeo Serra de Tramuntana
10th Veneto Classic
2022 (2 pro wins)
Adriatica Ionica Race

1st Points classification
1st Stages 1 & 5

7th Coppa Bernocchi
2023
2nd Overall Arctic Race of Norway
7th Coppa Bernocchi
9th GP Industria & Artigianato di Larciano
10th GP Miguel Induráin
2024
4th Trofeo Laigueglia
8th Cadel Evans Great Ocean Road Race
8th Figueira Champions Classic
2025 (5)
1st Overall Tour des Alpes-Maritimes

1st Stage 1

1st Classic Var
1st Giro della Romagna
1st Stage 16 Giro d'Italia
2nd Trofeo Laigueglia
2nd GP Industria & Artigianato di Larciano
2nd Clàssica Comunitat Valenciana 1969
2nd Clásica Terres de l'Ebre
2nd Trofeo Calvià
3rd Overall Arctic Race of Norway
3rd Vuelta a Murcia
3rd Vuelta a Castilla y León
4th Road race, UEC European Road Championships
4th Coppa Sabatini
4th Trofeo Tessile & Moda
5th Ardèche Classic
5th Gran Premio Castellón
6th Giro della Toscana
8th Clásica de San Sebastián
10th Prueba Villafranca de Ordizia
2026 (3)
1st Overall Tour of Oman

1st Points classification
1st Stage 5

1st Classica Camp de Morvedre
2nd GP Industria & Artigianato di Larciano
2nd Tour des Alpes-Maritimes
3rd Road race, UEC European Road Championships
3rd Trofeo Serra Tramuntana
3rd Giro della Toscana
4th Clásica de San Sebastián
4th Coppa Sabatini
4th Muscat Classic
5th Giro del Veneto
5th Trofeo Andratx–Pollença
6th GP Miguel Induráin
6th Trofeo Laigueglia
6th Veneto Classic
7th Overall Tour de Pologne
7th La Drôme Classic
7th Tre Valli Varesine
8th Liège–Bastogne–Liège
8th Giro di Lombardia

=== Grand Tour general classification results timeline ===
Grand Tour	2023	2024	2025
Giro d'Italia	58	DNF	40
Tour de France	—	—	—
Vuelta a España	—	—	—

Legend
—	Did not compete
DNF	Did not finish
