= 2026 La Drôme Classic =

2026 UCI ProSeries

Race details
- Dates: 1 March 2026
- Stages: 1
- Distance: 189 km (117 mi)
- Winning time: 4h 14' 11"

Results
	Winner	Romain Grégoire (FRA)	(Groupama–FDJ United)
	Second	Matteo Jorgenson (USA)	(Visma–Lease a Bike)
	Third	Lenny Martinez (FRA)	(Team Bahrain Victorious)

The 2026 La Drôme Classic, officially the Faun Drôme Classic due to sponsorships, was the 13th edition of the Drôme Classic cycle race. It was being held on 1 March 2026 as a category 1.Pro race on the 2026 UCI ProSeries calendar. The race started and finished in Étoile-sur-Rhône.

== Teams ==
Twenty-one teams of up to seven riders participated in the race, which included twelve UCI WorldTeams, six UCI ProTeams, and three UCI Continental teams.

UCI WorldTeams

- Decathlon CMA CGM
- EF Education–EasyPost
- Groupama–FDJ United
- INEOS Grenadiers
- Lidl–Trek
- Lotto–Intermarché
- Movistar Team
- Team Bahrain Victorious
- Team Picnic–PostNL
- UAE Team Emirates XRG
- Visma–Lease a Bike
- XDS Astana Team

UCI ProTeams

- Caja Rural–Seguros RGA
- Cofidis
- Pinarello–Q36.5 Pro Cycling Team
- Team TotalEnergies
- Tudor Pro Cycling Team
- Unibet Rose Rockets

UCI Continental Teams

- CIC Pro Cycling Academy
- Nice Métropole Côte d'Azur
- Van Rysel–Roubaix

== Result ==
Result
Rank	Rider	Team	Time
1	Romain Grégoire (FRA)	Groupama–FDJ United	4h 14' 11"
2	Matteo Jorgenson (USA)	Visma–Lease a Bike	+ 0"
3	Lenny Martinez (FRA)	Team Bahrain Victorious	+ 2"
4	Quinten Hermans (BEL)	Pinarello–Q36.5 Pro Cycling Team	+ 2"
5	Paul Lapeira (FRA)	Decathlon CMA CGM	+ 2"
6	Dorian Godon (FRA)	INEOS Grenadiers	+ 2"
7	Christian Scaroni (ITA)	XDS Astana Team	+ 2"
8	Alex Aranburu (ESP)	Cofidis	+ 2"
9	Lukas Nerurkar (GBR)	EF Education–EasyPost	+ 2"
10	Clément Venturini (FRA)	Unibet Rose Rockets	+ 10"
