= 2025 UCI Road World Championships – Mixed team relay =

Cycling event

Mixed team relay
2025 UCI Road World Championships

Race details
- Dates: 24 September 2025
- Distance: 41.8 km (26.0 mi)
- Winning time: 54:30.47

Medalists
	Gold	Australia
	Silver	France
	Bronze	Switzerland

The mixed team relay of the 2025 UCI Road World Championships was a cycling event that took place on 24 September 2025 in Kigali, Rwanda. It was won by Australia.

== Final classification ==
Rank	Riders	Team	Time	Behind
1st place, gold medalist(s)	Michael Matthews; Lucas Plapp; Jay Vine; Brodie Chapman; Amanda Spratt; Felicity Wilson-Haffenden	Australia	54:30.47	–
2nd place, silver medalist(s)	Bruno Armirail; Paul Seixas; Pavel Sivakov; Cédrine Kerbaol; Juliette Labous; Maeva Squiban	France	54:35.71	+5.24
3rd place, bronze medalist(s)	Jan Christen; Stefan Küng; Mauro Schmid; Jasmin Liechti; Marlen Reusser; Noemi Rüegg	Switzerland	54:40.47	+10.00
4	Mattia Cattaneo; Marco Frigo; Matteo Sobrero; Soraya Paladin; Monica Trinca Colonel; Federica Venturelli	Italy	55:45.03	+1:14.56
5	Miguel Heidemann; Louis Leidert; Jonas Rutsch; Franziska Koch; Justyna Czapla; Antonia Niedermaier	Germany	56:04.05	+1:33.58
6	Héctor Álvarez; Raúl García Pierna; Iván Romeo; Mireia Benito; Paula Blasi; Usoa Ostolaza	Spain	56:25.99	+1:55.52
7	Victor Campenaerts; Florian Vermeersch; Jonathan Vervenne; Marieke Meert; Tess Moerman; Julie van de Velde	Belgium	58:50.14	+4:19.67
8	Heorhii Chyzhykov; Danylo Kozoriz; Semen Simon; Yuliia Biriukova; Yelyzaveta Holod; Olha Kulynych	Ukraine	1:00:33.83	+6:03.36
9	Li You; Liu Jiankun; Su Haoyu; Zeng Luyao; Zhang Hao; Zhao Qing	China	1:01:08.72	+6:38.25
10	Tekle Alemayo; Geremedhin Hailemaryam; Bizay Redae; Brhan Abrha; Haftu Reda; Serkalem Watango	Ethiopia	1:02:22.60	+7:52.13
11	Patrick Byukusenge; Eric Nkundabera; Mike Uwiduhaye; Diane Ingabire; Xaveline Nirere; Claudette Nyirarukundo	Rwanda	1:03:08.97	+8:38.50
12	Aurélien de Comarmond; Alexandre Mayer; William Piat; Lucie de Marigny-Lagesse; Aurelie Halbwachs; Kimberley Le Court	Mauritius	1:03:28.23	+8:57.76
13	Mohamed Aziz Dellai (TUN); Yafiet Mulufeta (ETH); Ahmad Wais; Alaliaa Darwish (EGY); Fariba Hashimi (AFG); Yulduz Hashimi (AFG)	World Cycling Centre	1:03:34.14	+9:03.67
14	Kimuli Arafat; Lawrence Lorot; Shafik Mugalu; Mary Aleper; Nantume Miria; Florence Nakagwa	Uganda	1:05:58.19	+11:27.72
15	Glorad Saizonou; Ricardo Sodjèdé; Jeroff Ted Yao Tossavi; Hermione Ahouissou; Rainatou Kpovihouede; Charlotte Metoevi	Benin	1:12:14.74	+17:44.27
