= 2026 Eschborn–Frankfurt =

One-day cycling race in Germany

2026 UCI World Tour, race 21 of 36

Race details
- Dates: 1 May 2026
- Stages: 1
- Distance: 211.4 km (131.4 mi)
- Winning time: 4h 59' 34"

Results
	Winner	Georg Zimmermann (GER)	(Lotto–Intermarché)
	Second	Tom Pidcock (GBR)	(Pinarello–Q36.5 Pro Cycling Team)
	Third	Ben Tulett (GBR)	(Visma–Lease a Bike)

The 2026 Eschborn–Frankfurt was a road cycling one-day race that took place on 1 May in Germany. It was the 63rd edition of Eschborn–Frankfurt and the 21st event of the 2026 UCI World Tour.

== Teams ==
Sixteen UCI WorldTeams and five UCI ProTeams participated in the race.

UCI WorldTeams

- Alpecin–Premier Tech
- Decathlon CMA CGM
- EF Education–EasyPost
- INEOS Grenadiers
- Lidl–Trek
- Lotto–Intermarché
- Movistar Team
- NSN Cycling Team
- Red Bull–Bora–Hansgrohe
- Soudal–Quick-Step
- Team Bahrain Victorious
- Team Jayco–AlUla
- Team Picnic–PostNL
- UAE Team Emirates XRG
- Uno-X Mobility
- Visma–Lease a Bike

UCI ProTeams

- Cofidis
- Pinarello–Q36.5 Pro Cycling Team
- Team TotalEnergies
- Tudor Pro Cycling Team
- Unibet Rose Rockets

== Result ==
Result
Rank	Rider	Team	Time
1	Georg Zimmermann (GER)	Lotto–Intermarché	4h 59' 34"
2	Tom Pidcock (GBR)	Pinarello–Q36.5 Pro Cycling Team	+ 0"
3	Ben Tulett (GBR)	Visma–Lease a Bike	+ 0"
4	Pello Bilbao (ESP)	Team Bahrain Victorious	+ 0"
5	Simone Gualdi (ITA)	Lotto–Intermarché	+ 0"
6	Ion Izagirre (ESP)	Cofidis	+ 0"
7	Natnael Tesfatsion (ERI)	Movistar Team	+ 0"
8	Alex Baudin (FRA)	EF Education–EasyPost	+ 0"
9	Florian Stork (GER)	Tudor Pro Cycling Team	+ 0"
10	Adrià Pericas (ESP)	UAE Team Emirates XRG	+ 0"
