= Paul Seixas =

French road cyclist (born 2006)

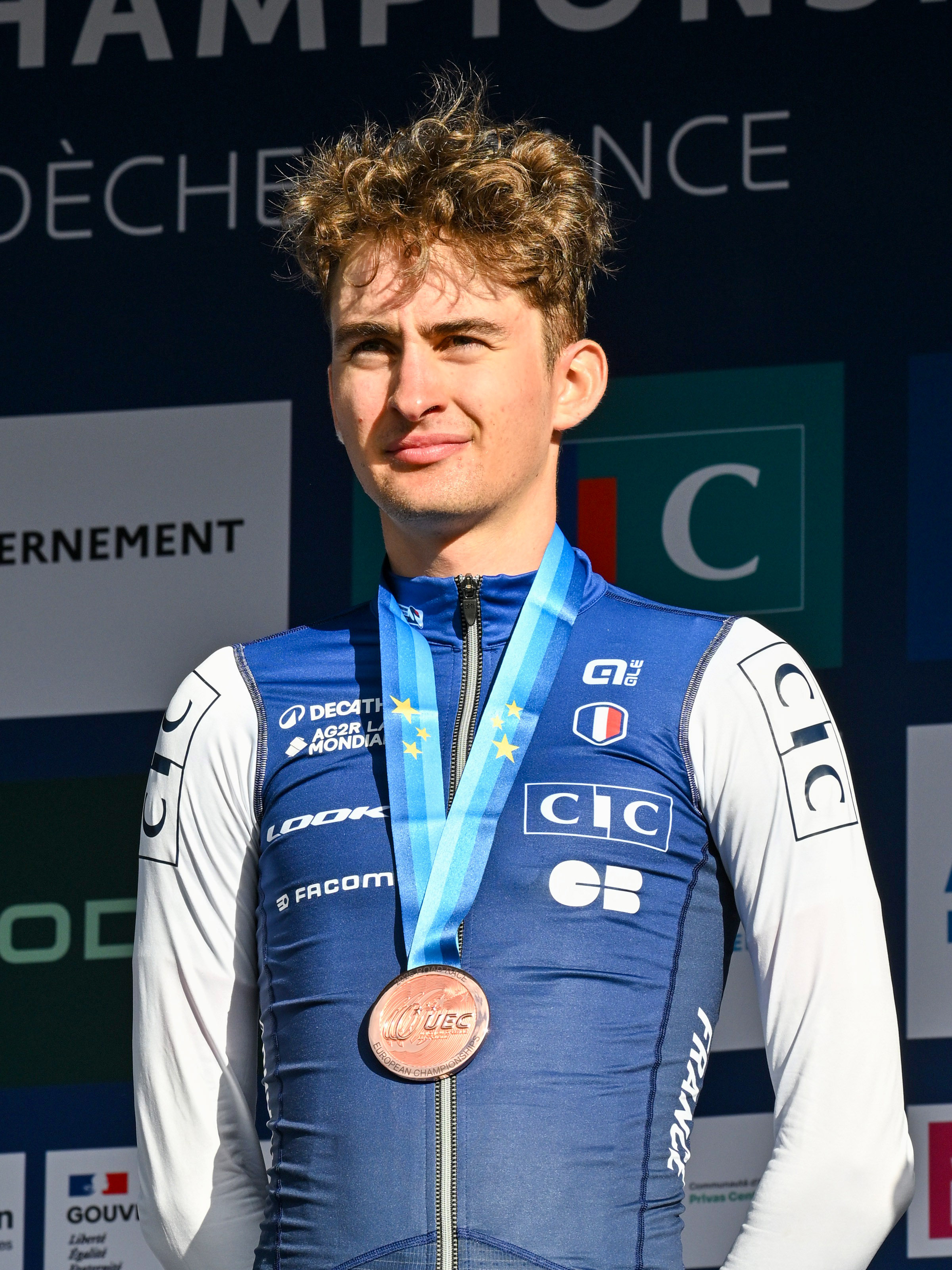
- Seixas in 2025

Personal information
- Born: 24 September 2006 (age 20) Lyon, France
- Height: 1.86 m (6 ft 1 in)
- Weight: 64 kg (141 lb; 10 st 1 lb)

Cycling career
- Sport: Cycling
- Current team: Decathlon CMA CGM Team
- Disciplines: Road; Cyclo-cross
- Role: Rider
- Rider type: All-rounder

Amateur teams
- 2021–2023: VC Villefranche Beaujolais
- 2023–2024: AG2R Citroën U19 Team
- 2024: La Motte–Servolex Cyclisme U19

Professional team
- 2025–: Decathlon–AG2R La Mondiale

Major wins
- Stage races Tour of the Basque Country (2026) One-day races and Classics Giro di Lombardia (2026) La Flèche Wallonne (2026) Ardèche Classic (2026)
Medal record
Men's road cycling
Representing France
World Championships
Gold medal – first place	2024 Zurich	Junior time trial
Silver medal – second place	2025 Kigali	Mixed team relay
Bronze medal – third place	2026 Montreal	Elite time trial
European Championships
Bronze medal – third place	2024 Limburg	Junior road race
Bronze medal – third place	2025 Guilherand-Granges	Elite road race

Paul Seixas (born 24 September 2006) is a French road cyclist who rides for UCI WorldTeam Decathlon CMA CGM Team. He won the junior time trial at the 2024 UCI Road World Championships. Subsequent victories as a Junior, including the 2025 Tour de l'Avenir, and performances in his first two years as a professional cyclist, including being the youngest rider ever to finish in the top 10 of a UCI World Tour stage race at 2025 Critérium du Dauphiné have led him to be described as "the next great talent" of professional cycling.

== Early years ==
Born in Lyon, both of his parents, Emmanuel and Emmanuelle Seixas, were competitive karate athletes, his father having been runner-up in the French national championships. Seixas became interested in cycling watching it with his grandfather on French television. His great-grandfather was Portuguese married to a Czechoslovak wife.

Paul began riding aged 8 with a local cycling club, Lyon Sprint Évolution (LSE). He was described as absent-minded and shy by his teachers, but he quickly succeeded in cycling, winning numerous age-range categories between 9 and 14 with LSE. He then moved to Anse in 2021 and joined the Vélo Club Villefranche Beaujolais (VCVB).

== Cycling career ==
=== Junior career ===
Paul Seixas was French national Cadets (under-17) champion in both the road (2021) and Cyclo-cross (2022) disciplines.

In 2023, aged 16, he joined the AG2R Citroën U19 and competed in the Junior category for the first time. He won four races, including sixth in the Junior European Cyclo-Cross championships. Subsequently in 2024, still aged just 17, he won a notable number of junior titles and races: Liege-Bastogne-Liege Juniors, the French national Junior titles in Cyclo-Cross and Time-Trial, and taking third in the European Junior Time-Trial. At the 2024 UCI Road World Championships he won gold in the time-trial, and finished seventh in the road-race. The Worlds win brought him to global attention for the first time, and he subsequently turned professional with Decathlon–AG2R La Mondiale.

=== 2025: Debut season ===
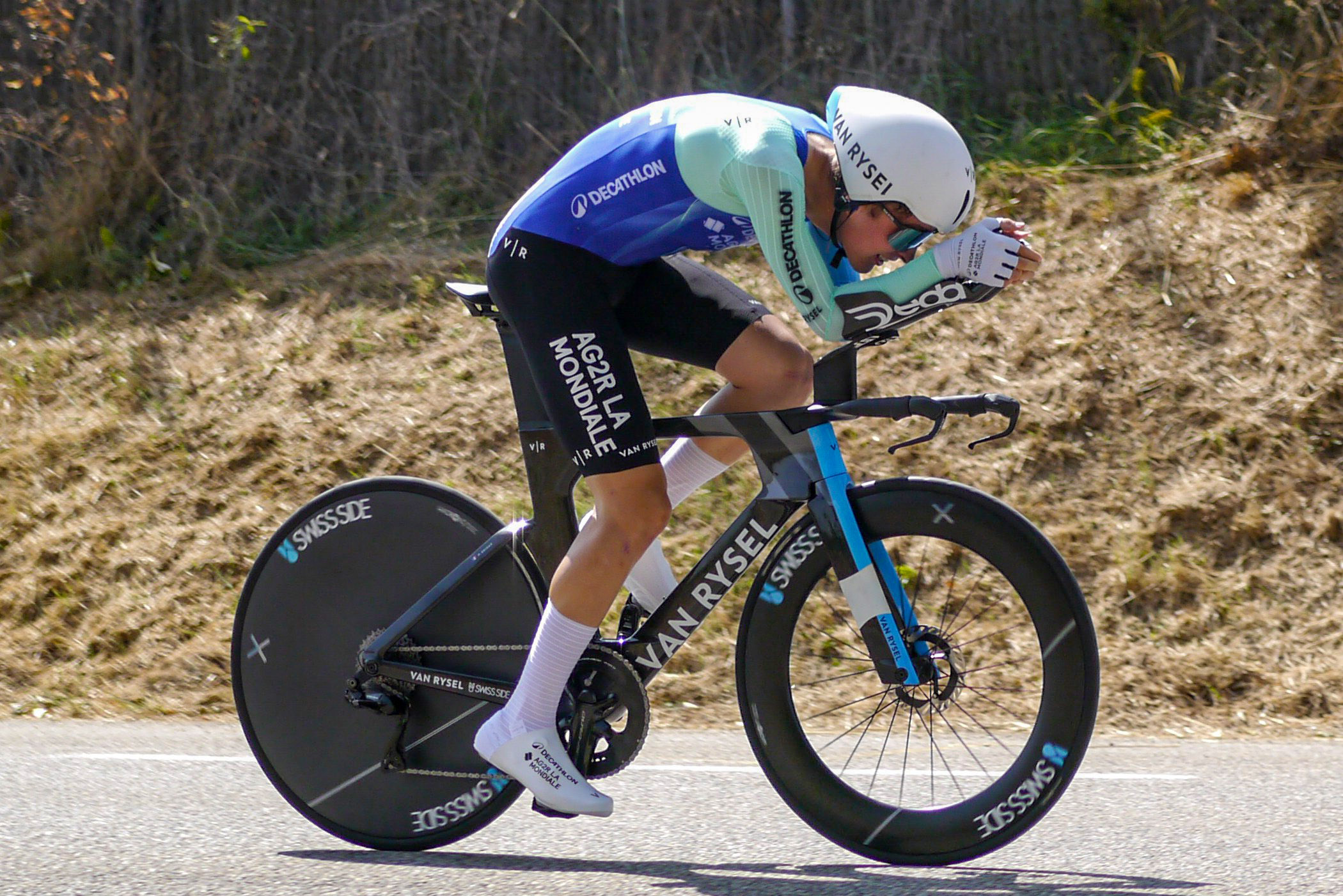
Seixas at the 2025 Critérium du Dauphiné

Seixas made his professional debut at the 2025 Grand Prix La Marseillaise, and his UCI World Tour debut subsequently at the 2025 UAE Tour. He took his first professional podium with second at Paris-Camembert, and the points jersey at the Tour of the Alps. It was his performance at the 2025 Critérium du Dauphiné which raised further the hype around Seixas' potential, with him taking an eighth place in the prestigious week-long stage race. He went on to win the 2025 Tour de l'Avenir, the under-23 equivalent of the Tour de France, raising further his profile as a potential Tour winner. Skipping the Junior category, he won medals at the 2025 UCI Road World Championships and 2025 European Road Championships: a silver in the Mixed team relay at the former, and a bronze in the Men's road race at the latter. He finished the season taking seventh in Il Lombardia, making him the youngest rider in over 100 years to finish in the top 10 of a Monument. It was at this point that commentators started noting that, in France in particular, the hype around Seixas was building dramatically, with warnings about rising expectations.

=== 2026: First successes ===
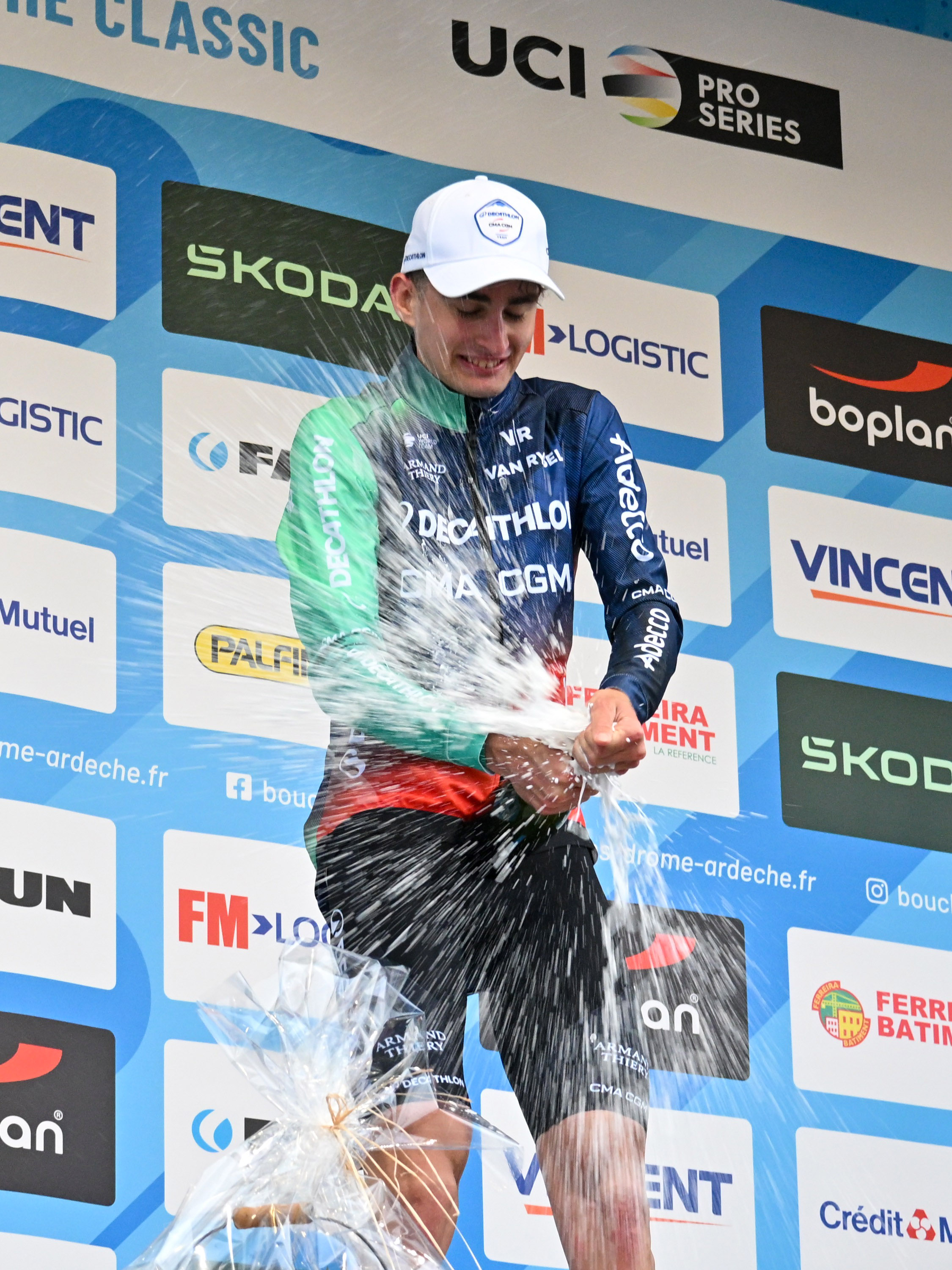
Seixas celebrating victory at the 2026 Faun Ardèche Classic

The 2026 season marked Seixas's definitive breakthrough on the world professional cycling stage. His early-season programme was built around a gradual progression towards the main objectives in the spring: Strade Bianche and Liège–Bastogne–Liège. On 19 February, Seixas claimed his first professional victory on stage 2 of the Volta ao Algarve, winning atop the Alto da Fóia ahead of João Almeida and Juan Ayuso. He finished the Portuguese race in second place overall.

Just ten days later, on 28 February, he won the Faun-Ardèche Classic with a solo breakaway of over 40 km, in a style commentators immediately likened to that of Tadej Pogačar. At Strade Bianche on 7 March, Seixas was the only rider to attempt to follow Pogačar's attack 79 km from the finish; he was eventually dropped but managed to distance Isaac del Toro in the final kilometre, to finish second. By this point, Seixas was being described as "the next great talent" after the dominant Pogačar. April 2026 brought Seixas' first World Tour stage race win with the overall and three stages at the Tour of the Basque Country, and his first World Tour one day race win at La Flèche Wallonne. On 10 October, he won the Giro di Lombardia at the age of 20, becoming the youngest winner in the history of the race.

== Major results ==
=== Road ===
2023
1st Overall Tour du Pays d'Olliergues

1st Mountains classification
1st Young rider classification
1st Stages 1 & 3

1st Trofeo Guido Dorigo
2nd Overall Tour du Valromey

1st Points classification
1st Young rider classification

2nd Overall Watersley Junior Challenge

1st Young rider classification

2nd La Classique des Alpes Juniors
3rd Overall Eroica Juniores

1st Young rider classification

4th Overall Saarland Trofeo

1st Young rider classification

5th Coppa Andrea Meneghelli
6th Overall Tour de Gironde

1st Young rider classification

8th E3 Saxo Classic Juniors
2024
UCI World Junior Championships

1st Time trial
7th Road race

National Junior Championships

1st Time trial
1st Team relay
3rd Road race

1st Overall Giro della Lunigiana

1st Points classification
1st Mountains classification
1st Stage 1

1st Overall Tour du Pays de Vaud

1st Stage 3

1st Liège–Bastogne–Liège Juniors
1st La Classique des Alpes Juniors
1st La Classic Région Sud Juniors
2nd Overall Tour du Valromey

1st Mountains classification
1st Stage 5

3rd Road race, UEC European Junior Championships
3rd Overall Trophée Centre Morbihan
6th Overall Eroica Juniores

1st Mountains classification

2025
1st Overall Tour de l'Avenir

1st Young rider classification
1st Prologue & Stage 6b (ITT)

1st Points classification, Tour of the Alps
2nd Team relay, UCI World Championships
2nd Paris–Camembert
3rd Road race, UEC European Championships
3rd Time trial, National Championships
5th Grand Prix La Marseillaise
7th Giro di Lombardia
8th Overall Critérium du Dauphiné
2026 (8 pro wins)
1st Overall Tour of the Basque Country

1st Points classification
1st Mountains classification
1st Young rider classification
1st Stages 1 (ITT), 2 & 5

1st Giro di Lombardia
1st La Flèche Wallonne
1st Ardèche Classic
2nd Overall Volta ao Algarve

1st Young rider classification
1st Stage 2

2nd Liège–Bastogne–Liège
2nd Strade Bianche
2nd Grand Prix Cycliste de Montréal
3rd Time trial, UCI World Championships
4th Overall Tour de France

Held after Stage 14

==== General classification results timeline ====
Grand Tour general classification results
Grand Tour	2025	2026
Giro d'Italia	—	—
Tour de France	—	4
Vuelta a España	—	—
Major stage race general classification results
Major stage race	2025	2026
Paris–Nice	—	—
Tirreno–Adriatico	—	—
Volta a Catalunya	—	—
Tour of the Basque Country	—	1
Tour de Romandie	—	—
Critérium du Dauphiné	8	DNF
Tour de Suisse	—	—

==== Classics results timeline ====
Monument	2025	2026
Milan–San Remo	—	—
Tour of Flanders	—	—
Paris–Roubaix	—	—
Liège–Bastogne–Liège	—	2
Giro di Lombardia	7	1
Classic	2025	2026
Strade Bianche	—	2
La Flèche Wallonne	—	1
Grand Prix Cycliste de Québec	—	17
Grand Prix Cycliste de Montréal	—	2

Legend
—	Did not compete
DNF	Did not finish

=== Cyclo-cross ===
2022–2023
1st Overall Swiss Junior Cup

1st Steinmaur
1st Hittnau
3rd Mettmenstetten

1st Junior Bulle
1st Junior Orée d'Anjou
1st Junior Dijon
Junior Coupe de France

2nd Troyes I

2023–2024
1st National Junior Championships
Swiss Junior Cup

1st Mettmenstetten
3rd Steinmaur

1st Junior Brionne
2nd Junior Illnau
Junior Coupe de France

3rd Quelneuc I
3rd Albi I
3rd Albi II

UCI Junior World Cup

3rd Namur
