= 2026 Bretagne Classic =

One-day cycling race in France

2026 Bretagne Classic CIC
2026 UCI World Tour, race 32 of 36

Race details
- Dates: 30 August 2026
- Stages: 1
- Distance: 228 km (142 mi)
- Winning time: 5h 21' 13"

Results
	Winner	Alex Aranburu (ESP)	(Cofidis)
	Second	Alexander Kamp (DEN)	(Uno-X Mobility)
	Third	Alessandro Borgo (ITA)	(Team Bahrain Victorious)

The 2026 Bretagne Classic CIC was a road cycling one-day race that took place on 30 August in the region of Brittany in northwestern France. It was the 90th edition of the Bretagne Classic and the 32nd event of the 2026 UCI World Tour.

== Teams ==
All eighteen UCI WorldTeams and six UCI ProTeams made up the twenty-four teams that participated in the race.

UCI WorldTeams

- Alpecin–Premier Tech
- Decathlon CMA CGM
- EF Education–EasyPost
- Groupama–FDJ United
- Lidl–Trek
- Lotto–Intermarché
- Movistar Team
- Netcompany INEOS
- NSN Cycling Team
- Red Bull–Bora–Hansgrohe
- Soudal–Quick-Step
- Team Bahrain Victorious
- Team Jayco–AlUla
- Team Picnic–PostNL
- Visma–Lease a Bike
- UAE Team Emirates XRG
- Uno-X Mobility
- XDS Astana Team

UCI ProTeams

- Cofidis
- Euskaltel–Euskadi
- Pinarello–Q36.5 Pro Cycling Team
- Team TotalEnergies
- Tudor Pro Cycling Team
- Unibet Rose Rockets

== Result ==
Result
Rank	Rider	Team	Time
1	Alex Aranburu (ESP)	Cofidis	5h 21' 13"
2	Alexander Kamp (DEN)	Uno-X Mobility	+ 4"
3	Alessandro Borgo (ITA)	Team Bahrain Victorious	+ 10"
4	Emil Herzog (GER)	Red Bull–Bora–Hansgrohe	+ 10"
5	Jenno Berckmoes (BEL)	Lotto–Intermarché	+ 10"
6	Paul Lapeira (FRA)	Decathlon CMA CGM	+ 10"
7	Romain Grégoire (FRA)	Groupama–FDJ United	+ 10"
8	Rick Pluimers (NED)	Tudor Pro Cycling Team	+ 10"
9	Alexandre Delettre (FRA)	Team TotalEnergies	+ 10"
10	Andrea Vendrame (ITA)	Team Jayco–AlUla	+ 10"
