= 2026 Trofeo Laigueglia =

2026 UCI ProSeries

Race details
- Dates: 4 March 2026
- Stages: 1
- Distance: 192 km (119.3 mi)
- Winning time: 4h 38' 50"

Results
	Winner	Santiago Buitrago (COL)	(Team Bahrain Victorious)
	Second	Romain Grégoire (FRA)	(Groupama–FDJ United)
	Third	Antonio Tiberi (ITA)	(Team Bahrain Victorious)

The 2026 Trofeo Laigueglia was a one-day road cycling race that took place on 4 March 2026 in and around Laigueglia. It was the 63rd edition of the Trofeo Laigueglia and was rated as a 1.Pro event as part the 2026 UCI ProSeries.

== Teams ==
Twenty-four teams were invited to the race, consisting of nine UCI WorldTour teams, ten UCI ProTeams, and five UCI Continental teams.

UCI WorldTeams

- EF Education–EasyPost
- Groupama–FDJ United
- Lotto–Intermarché
- NSN Cycling Team
- Soudal–Quick-Step
- Team Bahrain Victorious
- Team Jayco–AlUla
- UAE Team Emirates XRG
- XDS Astana Team

UCI ProTeams

- Bardiani–CSF 7 Saber
- Caja Rural–Seguros RGA
- Cofidis
- MBH Bank CSB Telecom Fort
- Pinarello–Q36.5 Pro Cycling Team
- Solution Tech NIPPO Rali
- Team Polti VisitMalta
- Team TotalEnergies
- Tudor Pro Cycling Team
- Unibet Rose Rockets

UCI Continental teams

- Beltrami TSA–Tre Colli
- Biesse–Carrera–Premac
- General Store–Essegibi–Fratelli Curia
- Red Bull–Bora–Hansgrohe Rookies
- Petrolike

== Result ==
Result
Rank	Rider	Team	Time
1	Santiago Buitrago (COL)	Team Bahrain Victorious	4h 38' 50"
2	Romain Grégoire (FRA)	Groupama–FDJ United	+ 25"
3	Antonio Tiberi (ITA)	Team Bahrain Victorious	+ 25"
4	Diego Ulissi (ITA)	XDS Astana Team	+ 40"
5	Andrea Vendrame (ITA)	Team Jayco–AlUla	+ 44"
6	Christian Scaroni (ITA)	XDS Astana Team	+ 44"
7	António Morgado (POR)	UAE Team Emirates XRG	+ 44"
8	Simone Gualdi (ITA)	Lotto–Intermarché	+ 44"
9	Mattéo Vercher (FRA)	Team TotalEnergies	+ 44"
10	Mauri Vansevenant (BEL)	Soudal–Quick-Step	+ 44"
