= 2026 Tre Valli Varesine =

- 2026 UCI ProSeries

Race details
- Dates: 6 October 2026
- Stages: 1
- Distance: 196.1 km (121.9 mi)
- Winning time: 4h 34' 32"

Results
| | Winner | Jarno Widar (BEL) | (Lotto–Intermarché) |
| | Second | Tom Pidcock (GBR) | (Pinarello–Q36.5 Pro Cycling Team) |
| | Third | Matteo Jorgenson (USA) | (Visma–Lease a Bike) |

The 2026 Tre Valli Varesine was the 105th edition of the Tre Valli Varesine road cycling one day race, which was held from Busto Arsizio to Varese, Italy, on 6 October 2026.

== Teams ==
Seventeen UCI WorldTeams and eight UCI ProTeams made up the twenty-five teams that participated in the race.

UCI WorldTeams

- Alpecin–Premier Tech
- Decathlon CMA CGM
- EF Education–EasyPost
- Groupama–FDJ United
- Lotto–Intermarché
- Lidl–Trek
- Movistar Team
- Netcompany INEOS
- NSN Cycling Team
- Red Bull–Bora–Hansgrohe
- Soudal–Quick-Step
- Team Bahrain Victorious
- Team Jayco–AlUla
- UAE Team Emirates XRG
- Uno-X Mobility
- Visma–Lease a Bike
- XDS Astana Team

UCI ProTeams

- Bardiani–CSF 7 Saber
- Caja Rural–Seguros RGA
- Cofidis
- MBH Bank CSB Telecom Fort
- Pinarello–Q36.5 Pro Cycling Team
- Team Polti VisitMalta
- Tudor Pro Cycling Team
- Solution Tech NIPPO Rali

== Results ==
Result
| Rank | Rider | Team | Time |
|---|---|---|---|
| 1 | Jarno Widar (BEL) | Lotto–Intermarché | 4h 34' 25" |
| 2 | Tom Pidcock (GBR) | Pinarello–Q36.5 Pro Cycling Team | + 0" |
| 3 | Matteo Jorgenson (USA) | Visma–Lease a Bike | + 0" |
| 4 | Quinn Simmons (USA) | Lidl–Trek | + 3" |
| 5 | Marc Hirschi (SUI) | Tudor Pro Cycling Team | + 3" |
| 6 | Pello Bilbao (ESP) | Team Bahrain Victorious | + 3" |
| 7 | Christian Scaroni (ITA) | XDS Astana Team | + 3" |
| 8 | Ludovico Crescioli (ITA) | Team Polti VisitMalta | + 3" |
| 9 | Jhonatan Narváez (ECU) | UAE Team Emirates XRG | + 3" |
| 10 | Simone Gualdi (ITA) | Lotto–Intermarché | + 3" |
