= 2026 Liège–Bastogne–Liège =

Cycling race

2026 UCI World Tour, race 19 of 36
- Official event poster

Race details
- Dates: 26 April 2026
- Stages: 1
- Distance: 259.5 km (161.2 mi)
- Winning time: 5h 50' 28"

Results
	Winner	Tadej Pogačar (SLO)	(UAE Team Emirates XRG)
	Second	Paul Seixas (FRA)	(Decathlon CMA CGM)
	Third	Remco Evenepoel (BEL)	(Red Bull–Bora–Hansgrohe)

The 2026 Liège–Bastogne–Liège was a Belgian road cycling one-day race that took place on 26 April. It was the 112th edition of Liège–Bastogne–Liège and the 19th event of the 2026 UCI World Tour. It was the finale of the Ardennes classics, following the Amstel Gold Race and La Flèche Wallonne. The route was 259.5 kilometres (161.2 mi) long, slightly longer than the previous edition, and featured eleven classified climbs, starting and ending in Liège.

The race was won by Slovenian rider Tadej Pogačar of UAE Team Emirates XRG for the fourth time.

== Pre-race favorites ==
Defending champion Tadej Pogačar, a three-time winner of the race (2021, 2024, 2025), was widely considered the top favourite, having already won Strade Bianche, Milan–San Remo and the Tour of Flanders earlier in the spring. The other top contenders were Remco Evenepoel, a two-time champion (2022, 2023), who arrived in strong form after winning the Amstel Gold Race, and nineteen-year-old Paul Seixas, making his debut at the race after winning the La Flèche Wallonne earlier in the week. Tom Pidcock, Kévin Vauquelin, Mattias Skjelmose, and Giulio Ciccone were also mentioned as contenders in pre-race analysis.

== Teams ==
25 teams took part in the race, including all eighteen UCI WorldTeams and seven UCI ProTeams.

UCI WorldTeams

- Alpecin–Premier Tech
- Decathlon CMA CGM
- EF Education–EasyPost
- Groupama–FDJ United
- INEOS Grenadiers
- Lidl–Trek
- Lotto–Intermarché
- Movistar Team
- NSN Cycling Team
- Red Bull–Bora–Hansgrohe
- Soudal–Quick-Step
- Team Bahrain Victorious
- Team Jayco–AlUla
- Team Picnic–PostNL
- Visma–Lease a Bike
- UAE Team Emirates XRG
- Uno-X Mobility
- XDS Astana Team

UCI ProTeams

- Burgos Burpellet BH
- Caja Rural–Seguros RGA
- Cofidis
- Equipo Kern Pharma
- Pinarello–Q36.5 Pro Cycling Team
- Team TotalEnergies
- Tudor Pro Cycling Team

== Result ==
Result
Rank	Rider	Team	Time
1	Tadej Pogačar (SLO)	UAE Team Emirates XRG	5h 50' 28"
2	Paul Seixas (FRA)	Decathlon CMA CGM	+ 45"
3	Remco Evenepoel (BEL)	Red Bull–Bora–Hansgrohe	+ 1' 42"
4	Emiel Verstrynge (BEL)	Alpecin–Premier Tech	+ 1' 42"
5	Egan Bernal (COL)	INEOS Grenadiers	+ 1' 42"
6	Pello Bilbao (ESP)	Team Bahrain Victorious	+ 1' 42"
7	Romain Grégoire (FRA)	Groupama–FDJ United	+ 1' 42"
8	Christian Scaroni (ITA)	XDS Astana Team	+ 1' 42"
9	Tobias Halland Johannessen (NOR)	Uno-X Mobility	+ 1' 42"
10	Filippo Zana (ITA)	Soudal–Quick-Step	+ 1' 42"
