= 2025 European Road Championships – Men's road race =

Men's road race
2025 European Road Championships
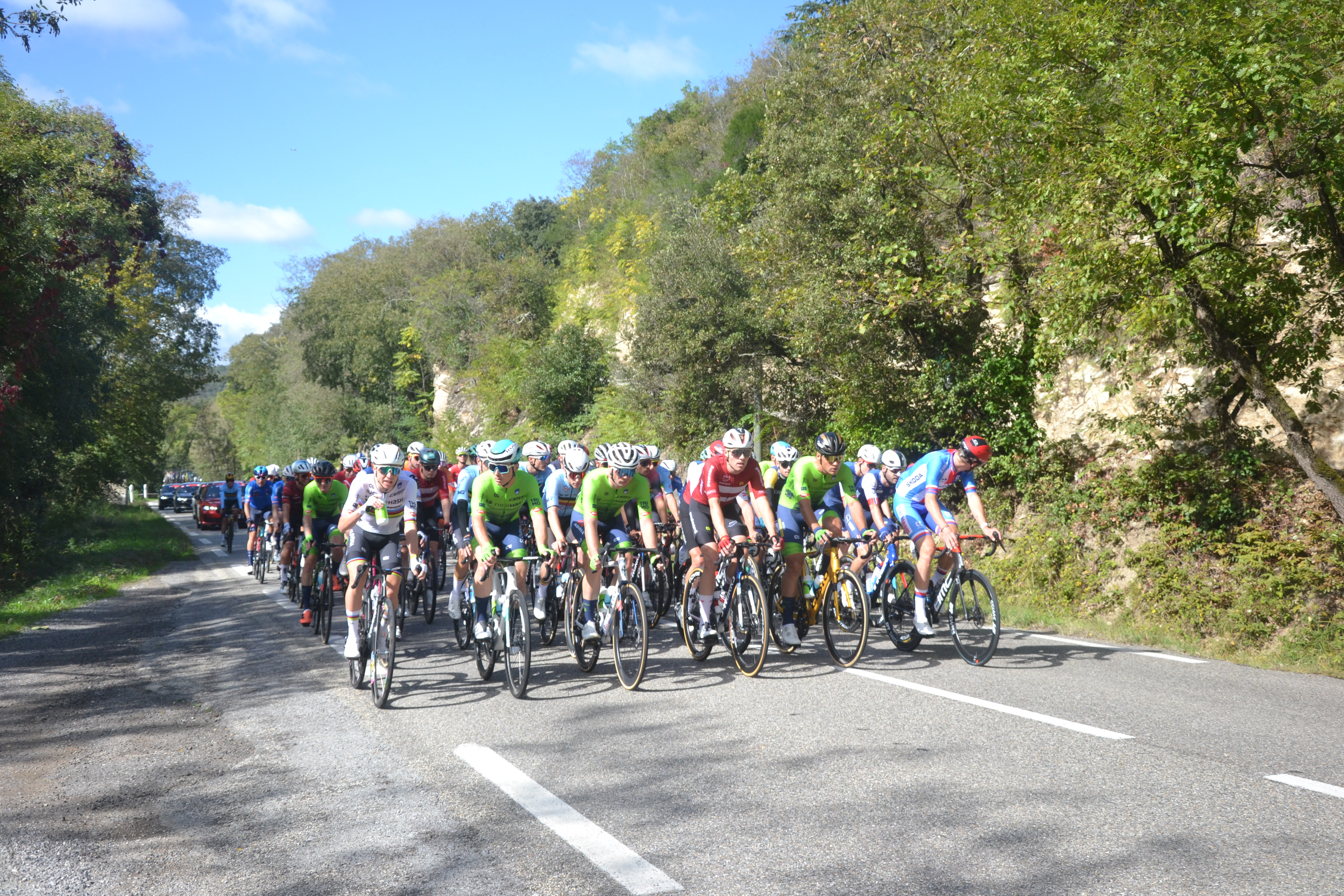

Race details
- Dates: 5 October 2025
- Stages: 1
- Distance: 202.5 km (125.8 mi)
- Winning time: 4:59:29

Medalists
	Gold	Tadej Pogačar (SLO)
	Silver	Remco Evenepoel (BEL)
	Bronze	Paul Seixas (FRA)

The men's elite road race at the 2025 European Road Championships took place on 5 October 2025, in Guilherand-Granges, France.

== Results ==
Rank	#	Cyclist	Nation	Time / Diff.
1st place, gold medalist(s)	1	Tadej Pogačar	Slovenia	4h 59' 29"
2nd place, silver medalist(s)	12	Remco Evenepoel	Belgium	+ 31"
3rd place, bronze medalist(s)	36	Paul Seixas	France	+ 3' 41"
4	28	Christian Scaroni	Italy	+ 4' 04"
5	78	Toms Skujiņš	Latvia	+ 4' 16"
6	45	Juan Ayuso	Spain	+ 4' 21"
7	23	Mattias Skjelmose	Denmark	+ 5' 01"
8	37	Pavel Sivakov	France	+ 5' 55"
9	27	Gianmarco Garofoli	Italy	+ 5' 59"
10	32	Romain Gregoire	France	+ 6' 52"
11	26	Marco Frigo	Italy	+ 6' 55"
12	35	Nicolas Prodhomme	France	+ 7' 18"
13	9	Tiesj Benoot	Belgium	s.t.
14	16	Louis Vervaeke	Belgium	s.t.
15	66	Felix Großschartner	Austria	+ 7' 33"
16	34	Aurélien Paret-Peintre	France	+ 8' 20"
17	81	Mats Wenzel	Luxembourg	+ 12' 32"
DNF	2	Tilen Finkšt	Slovenia	
DNF	29	Diego Ulissi	Italy	
DNF	30	Alex Baudin	France	
DNF	31	Julien Bernard	France	
DNF	33	Valentin Paret-Peintre	France	
DNF	38	Huub Artz	Netherlands	
DNF	39	Tibor del Grosso	Netherlands	
DNF	3	Matevž Govekar	Slovenia	
DNF	4	Matej Mohorič	Slovenia	
DNF	40	Daan Hoole	Netherlands	
DNF	41	Menno Huising	Netherlands	
DNF	42	Mathijs Paasschens	Netherlands	
DNF	44	Igor Arrieta	Spain	
DNF	46	Abel Balderstone	Spain	
DNF	49	Pablo Torres	Spain	
DNF	50	João Almeida	Portugal	
DNF	51	Rui Costa	Portugal	
DNF	53	Tiago Antunes	Portugal	
DNF	54	Johannes Adamietz	Germany	
DNF	55	Miguel Heidemann	Germany	
DNF	60	Nils Brun	Switzerland	
DNF	61	Jan Christen	Switzerland	
DNF	62	Valentin Darbellay	Switzerland	
DNF	63	Marc Hirschi	Switzerland	
DNF	65	Arnaud Tendon	Switzerland	
DNF	68	Mathias Vacek	Czechia	
DNF	69	Jakub Ťoupalík	Czechia	
DNF	70	Jakub Kaczmarek	Poland	
DNF	71	Danny van der Tuuk	Poland	
DNF	72	Markus Pajur	Estonia	
DNF	73	Lukáš Kubiš	Slovakia	
DNF	74	Martin Svrček	Slovakia	
DNF	75	Kristiāns Belohvoščiks	Latvia	
DNF	76	Emīls Liepiņš	Latvia	
DNF	79	Kévin Geniets	Luxembourg	
DNF	7	Anže Skok	Slovenia	
DNF	8	Mihael Štajnar	Slovenia	
DNF	80	Arthur Kluckers	Luxembourg	
DNF	82	Miltiadis Giannoutsos	Greece	
DNF	83	Emiliano Vila	Greece	
DNF	84	Anatolii Budiak	Ukraine	
DNF	85	Kyrylo Tsarenko	Ukraine	
DNF	86	Attila Valter	Hungary	
DNF	87	Mattew-Denis Piciu	Romania	
DNF	10	Jenno Berckmoes	Belgium	
DNF	88	Iustin-Ioan Văidian	Romania	
DNF	89	Ognjen Ilić	Serbia	
DNF	11	Steff Cras	Belgium	
DNF	90	Antoine Berlin	Monaco	
DNF	91	Victor Langellotti	Monaco	
DNF	14	Xandro Meurisse	Belgium	
DNF	15	Maxim Van Gils	Belgium	
DNF	92	Andréa Mifsud	Malta	
DNF	93	Ahmet Örken	Turkey	
DNF	94	Ahmet Can Akpınar	Turkey	
DNF	95	Tahir Yiğit	Turkey	
DNF	96	Borislav Palashev	Bulgaria	
DNF	17	Anthon Charmig	Denmark	
DNF	18	Alexander Kamp	Denmark	
DNF	19	Niklas Larsen	Denmark	
DNF	97	Jaakko Hänninen	Finland	
DNF	98	Lukas Sulaj Kloppenborg	Albania	
DNF	99	Vedad Karić	Bosnia	
DNF	100	Ilie Seremet	Moldova	
DNF	21	Casper Pedersen	Denmark	
DNF	101	Artem Nych	Individual Neutral Athletes	
DNF	22	Rasmus Søjberg Pedersen	Denmark	
DNF	24	Jonas Vingegaard	Denmark	
DNF	25	Alberto Bettiol	Italy	
DNF	13	Junior Lecerf	Belgium	
DNF	67	Petr Kelemen	Czechia	
DNF	56	Lennard Kämna	Germany	
DNF	57	Oliver Mattheis	Germany	
DNF	58	Anton Schiffer	Germany	
DNF	59	Georg Zimmermann	Germany	
DNF	5	Domen Novak	Slovenia	
DNF	6	Jaka Primožič	Slovenia	
DNF	47	Markel Beloki	Spain	
DNF	48	Urko Berrade	Spain	
DNF	64	Jan Stöckli	Switzerland	
DNS	43	Dylan Van Baarle	Belgium	
DNS	52	António Morgado	Portugal	
DNS	77	Krists Neilands	Latvia	
DNS	20	Mads Pedersen	Denmark	
