= 2026 Il Lombardia =

Cycling race

2026 UCI World Tour, race 35 of 36

Race details
- Dates: 10 October 2026
- Stages: 1
- Distance: 239 km (149 mi)
- Winning time: 5h 49' 28"

Results
	Winner	Paul Seixas (FRA)	(Decathlon CMA CGM)
	Second	Enric Mas (ESP)	(Movistar Team)
	Third	Giulio Ciccone (ITA)	(Lidl–Trek)

The 2026 Il Lombardia was the 120th edition of the Giro di Lombardia one-day road cycling race. The event, organized on 10 October 2026, is the 35th race of the 2026 UCI World Tour. Starting from Bergamo, the 239 km race finishes in Como near the lakefront.

The race was won by Paul Seixas, who is currently the youngest winner of the Giro di Lombardia, at the age of 20 years and 16 days old.

== Teams ==
Twenty-five teams participated in the race.

== Results ==
Result
Rank	Rider	Team	Time
1	Paul Seixas (FRA)	Decathlon CMA CGM	5h 49' 28"
2	Enric Mas (ESP)	Movistar Team	+ 48"
3	Giulio Ciccone (ITA)	Lidl–Trek	+ 1' 05"
4	Remco Evenepoel (BEL)	Red Bull–Bora–Hansgrohe	+ 1' 20"
5	Brandon McNulty (USA)	UAE Team Emirates XRG	+ 1' 20"
6	Thomas Pidcock (GBR)	Pinarello–Q36.5 Pro Cycling Team	+ 1' 20"
7	Pello Bilbao (ESP)	Team Bahrain Victorious	+ 1' 20"
8	Christian Scaroni (ITA)	XDS Astana Team	+ 1' 20"
9	Filippo Zana (ITA)	Soudal–Quick-Step	+ 1' 20"
10	Mathys Rondel (FRA)	Tudor Pro Cycling Team	+ 1' 20"
