= 2024 Liège–Bastogne–Liège =

Cycling race

2024 UCI World Tour, race 19 of 35

Race details
- Dates: 21 April 2024
- Stages: 1
- Distance: 259 km (161 mi)
- Winning time: 6h 13' 48"

Results
	Winner	Tadej Pogačar (SLO)	(UAE Team Emirates)
	Second	Romain Bardet (FRA)	(Team dsm–firmenich PostNL)
	Third	Mathieu van der Poel (NED)	(Alpecin–Deceuninck)

The 2024 Liège–Bastogne–Liège was a Belgian road cycling one-day race that took place on 21 April. It was the 110th edition of Liège–Bastogne–Liège and the 19th event of the 2024 UCI World Tour. It was won for the second time by Tadej Pogačar (UAE Team Emirates), after a solo attack with around 30 kilometres remaining.

== Teams ==
All eighteen UCI WorldTeams and seven UCI ProTeams took part in the race.

UCI WorldTeams

- Alpecin–Deceuninck
- Arkéa–B&B Hotels
- Astana Qazaqstan Team
- Bora–Hansgrohe
- Cofidis
- Decathlon–AG2R La Mondiale
- EF Education–EasyPost
- Groupama–FDJ
- INEOS Grenadiers
- Intermarché–Wanty
- Lidl–Trek
- Movistar Team
- Soudal–Quick-Step
- Team Bahrain Victorious
- Team dsm–firmenich PostNL
- Team Jayco–AlUla
- UAE Team Emirates
- Visma–Lease a Bike

UCI ProTeams

- Bingoal WB
- Equipo Kern Pharma
- Israel–Premier Tech
- Lotto–Dstny
- Team Flanders–Baloise
- Team TotalEnergies
- Uno-X Mobility

== Result ==
Result
Rank	Rider	Team	Time
1	Tadej Pogačar (SLO)	UAE Team Emirates	6h 13' 48"
2	Romain Bardet (FRA)	Team dsm–firmenich PostNL	+ 1' 39"
3	Mathieu van der Poel (NED)	Alpecin–Deceuninck	+ 2' 02"
4	Maxim Van Gils (BEL)	Lotto–Dstny	+ 2' 02"
5	Aurélien Paret-Peintre (FRA)	Decathlon–AG2R La Mondiale	+ 2' 02"
6	Mauri Vansevenant (BEL)	Soudal–Quick-Step	+ 2' 02"
7	Valentin Madouas (FRA)	Groupama–FDJ	+ 2' 02"
8	Alexey Lutsenko (KAZ)	Astana Qazaqstan Team	+ 2' 02"
9	Pello Bilbao (ESP)	Team Bahrain Victorious	+ 2' 02"
10	Tom Pidcock (GBR)	INEOS Grenadiers	+ 2' 02"
