= 2026 La Flèche Wallonne =

Cycling race

2026 UCI World Tour, race 18 of 36
- Event poster

Race details
- Dates: 22 April 2026
- Stages: 1
- Distance: 200 km (120 mi)
- Winning time: 4h 35' 29"

Results
	Winner	Paul Seixas (FRA)	(Decathlon CMA CGM)
	Second	Mauro Schmid (SUI)	(Team Jayco–AlUla)
	Third	Ben Tulett (GBR)	(Visma–Lease a Bike)

The 2026 La Flèche Wallonne was a road cycling one-day race that took place on 22 April from the Belgian city of Herstal to the municipality of Huy. It was the 90th edition of La Flèche Wallonne and the 18th event of the 2026 UCI World Tour.

The race was won by French rider Paul Seixas of Decathlon CMA CGM for the first time, his first World Tour one-day race victory. Seixas also became the youngest ever winner of La Flèche Wallonne.

== Course ==
The 200 kilometres (120 mi) course started in Herstal and finished in Huy, with the finish line on the top of the final ascent of the Mur de Huy. The final half of the course was three laps of a circuit (identical to the women's race), taking the ascents of Ereffe, Cherave and Huy three times.

The race featured 11 categorised climbs:

- 31.4 km: Côte de Trasenster – 3.3 km climb at 8.4%
- 40 km: Côte de Forges – 1.3 km climb at 7.8%
- 107.2 km: Côte d'Ereffe – 2.1 km climb at 5%
- 120 km: Côte de Cherave – 1.5 km climb at 8.1%
- 125.6 km: Mur de Huy – 1.3 km climb at 9.6%
- 144.4 km: Côte d'Ereffe – 2.1 km climb at 5%
- 157.2 km: Côte de Cherave – 1.5 km climb at 8.1%
- 162.8 km: Mur de Huy – 1.3 km climb at 9.6%
- 181.6 km: Côte d'Ereffe – 2.1 km climb at 5%
- 194.4 km: Côte de Cherave – 1.5 km climb at 8.1%
- 200 km: Mur de Huy – 1.3 km climb at 9.6%

== Teams ==
25 teams took part in the race, including all eighteen UCI WorldTeams and seven UCI ProTeams.

UCI WorldTeams

- Alpecin–Premier Tech
- Decathlon CMA CGM
- EF Education–EasyPost
- Groupama–FDJ United
- INEOS Grenadiers
- Lotto–Intermarché
- Lidl–Trek
- Movistar Team
- NSN Cycling Team
- Red Bull–Bora–Hansgrohe
- Soudal–Quick-Step
- Team Bahrain Victorious
- Team Jayco–AlUla
- Team Picnic–PostNL
- UAE Team Emirates XRG
- Uno-X Mobility
- Visma–Lease a Bike
- XDS Astana Team

UCI ProTeams

- Caja Rural–Seguros RGA
- Cofidis
- Pinarello–Q36.5 Pro Cycling Team
- Team Flanders–Baloise
- Team TotalEnergies
- Tudor Pro Cycling Team
- Unibet Rose Rockets

== Result ==
Result
Rank	Rider	Team	Time
1	Paul Seixas (FRA)	Decathlon CMA CGM	4h 35' 29"
2	Mauro Schmid (SUI)	Team Jayco–AlUla	+ 3"
3	Ben Tulett (GBR)	Visma–Lease a Bike	+ 3"
4	Benoît Cosnefroy (FRA)	UAE Team Emirates XRG	+ 3"
5	Mattias Skjelmose (DEN)	Lidl–Trek	+ 8"
6	Alex Baudin (FRA)	EF Education–EasyPost	+ 8"
7	Ion Izagirre (ESP)	Cofidis	+ 10"
8	Lenny Martinez (FRA)	Team Bahrain Victorious	+ 10"
9	Romain Grégoire (FRA)	Groupama–FDJ United	+ 10"
10	Andreas Kron (DEN)	Uno-X Mobility	+ 10"
