= 2026 Strade Bianche =

Bicycle race

2026 UCI World Tour, race 5 of 36

Race details
- Dates: 7 March 2026
- Stages: 1
- Distance: 201 km (125 mi)
- Winning time: 4h 45' 15"

Results
	Winner	Tadej Pogačar (SLO)	(UAE Team Emirates XRG)
	Second	Paul Seixas (FRA)	(Decathlon CMA CGM)
	Third	Isaac del Toro (MEX)	(UAE Team Emirates XRG)

The 2026 Strade Bianche was a road cycling one-day race that took place on 7 March 2026 in Tuscany, Italy. It was the 20th edition of the Strade Bianche and the fifth event of the 2026 UCI World Tour.

The race was won by Slovenian rider Tadej Pogačar of UAE Team Emirates XRG for a record fourth time, and for the third year in succession. Pogačar won the race following a solo attack with around 78 km (48 mi) remaining.

== Route ==
The race started and finished in Siena, Italy. Taking place over 201 kilometres (125 mi), the course included 64 km (40 mi) of 'strade bianche' gravel roads spread over fourteen sectors. The route had 17.7 km (11.0 mi) fewer gravel roads than the 2025 edition, and was around 15 km (9.3 mi) shorter in overall distance – organisers reversing changes from 2024 onwards that made the race significantly longer. The race finished on the Piazza del Campo, after a steep climb up Via Santa Caterina with a maximum gradient of 16%.

Prior to the race, the Colle Pinzuto sector was dedicated to Pogačar, following his third victory at the race in 2025.

== Teams ==
Twenty-five teams participated in the race, including all eighteen UCI WorldTeams and seven UCI ProTeams.

UCI WorldTeams

- Alpecin–Premier Tech
- Decathlon CMA CGM
- EF Education–EasyPost
- Groupama–FDJ United
- INEOS Grenadiers
- Lidl–Trek
- Lotto–Intermarché
- Movistar Team
- NSN Cycling Team
- Red Bull–Bora–Hansgrohe
- Soudal–Quick-Step
- Team Bahrain Victorious
- Team Jayco–AlUla
- Team Picnic–PostNL
- Visma–Lease a Bike
- UAE Team Emirates XRG
- Uno-X Mobility
- XDS Astana Team

UCI ProTeams

- Bardiani–CSF 7 Saber
- MBH Bank CSB Telecom Fort
- Pinarello–Q36.5 Pro Cycling Team
- Solution Tech NIPPO Rali
- Team Polti VisitMalta
- Tudor Pro Cycling Team
- Unibet Rose Rockets

== Result ==
Result
Rank	Rider	Team	Time
1	Tadej Pogačar (SLO)	UAE Team Emirates XRG	4h 45' 15"
2	Paul Seixas (FRA)	Decathlon CMA CGM	+ 1' 00"
3	Isaac del Toro (MEX)	UAE Team Emirates XRG	+ 1' 09"
4	Romain Grégoire (FRA)	Groupama–FDJ United	+ 2' 04"
5	Gianni Vermeersch (BEL)	Red Bull–Bora–Hansgrohe	+ 2' 04"
6	Jan Christen (SUI)	UAE Team Emirates XRG	+ 2' 07"
7	Tom Pidcock (GBR)	Pinarello–Q36.5 Pro Cycling Team	+ 2' 14"
8	Matteo Jorgenson (USA)	Visma–Lease a Bike	+ 2' 20"
9	Andreas Kron (DEN)	Uno-X Mobility	+ 3' 46"
10	Wout van Aert (BEL)	Visma–Lease a Bike	+ 3' 46"
