= 2025 Il Lombardia =

Cycling race

2025 UCI World Tour, race 35 of 36

Race details
- Dates: 11 October 2025
- Stages: 1
- Distance: 238 km (148 mi)
- Winning time: 5h 45' 53"

Results
	Winner	Tadej Pogačar (SLO)	(UAE Team Emirates XRG)
	Second	Remco Evenepoel (BEL)	(Soudal–Quick-Step)
	Third	Michael Storer (AUS)	(Tudor Pro Cycling Team)

The 2025 Il Lombardia was the 119th edition of the Giro di Lombardia one-day road cycling race. The event took place on 11 October 2025, and was the 35th race of the 2025 UCI World Tour. Starting from Como, the 238 km race finishes in Bergamo's Upper Town.

The race was won by Tadej Pogačar, who attacked with 36 km to go and rode solo to the finish. It was also Pogačar's fifth consecutive victory at the race, equalling the record of Fausto Coppi.

== Teams ==
Twenty-four teams participated in the race.

== Results ==
Result
Rank	Rider	Team	Time
1	Tadej Pogačar (SLO)	UAE Team Emirates XRG	5h 45' 53"
2	Remco Evenepoel (BEL)	Soudal–Quick-Step	+ 1' 48"
3	Michael Storer (AUS)	Tudor Pro Cycling Team	+ 3' 14"
4	Quinn Simmons (USA)	Lidl–Trek	+ 3' 39"
5	Isaac del Toro (MEX)	UAE Team Emirates XRG	+ 4' 16"
6	Thomas Pidcock (GBR)	Q36.5 Pro Cycling Team	+ 4' 16"
7	Paul Seixas (FRA)	Decathlon–AG2R La Mondiale	+ 4' 16"
8	Egan Bernal (COL)	INEOS Grenadiers	+ 4' 16"
9	Jay Vine (AUS)	UAE Team Emirates XRG	+ 4' 18"
10	Cian Uijtdebroeks (BEL)	Visma–Lease a Bike	+ 4' 30"
