= 2026 Tour Auvergne-Rhône-Alpes =

French cycling race

2026 UCI World Tour, race 23 of 36

Race details
- Dates: 7–14 June 2026
- Stages: 8
- Distance: 1,208.1 km (750.7 mi)
- Winning time: 29h 35' 05"

Results
Jersey awarded to the overall winner	Winner	Isaac del Toro (MEX)	(UAE Team Emirates XRG)
	Second	Luke Tuckwell (AUS)	(Red Bull–Bora–Hansgrohe)
	Third	Juan Ayuso (ESP)	(Lidl–Trek)
Jersey awarded to the points classification winner	Points	Nadav Raisberg (ISR)	(NSN Cycling Team)
Jersey awarded to the mountains classification winner	Mountains	Clément Braz Afonso (FRA)	(Groupama–FDJ United)
Jersey awarded to the young rider classification winner	Young rider	Isaac del Toro (MEX)	(UAE Team Emirates XRG)
	Team	(Netherlands) Visma–Lease a Bike	

The 2026 Tour Auvergne-Rhône-Alpes was a road cycling stage race that took place between 7 and 14 June in the Auvergne-Rhône-Alpes region of southeastern France. It was the 78th edition of Tour Auvergne-Rhône-Alpes (the first edition after renaming from Critérium du Dauphiné) and the 23rd race of the 2026 UCI World Tour. The general classification of the race was won by Isaac del Toro of UAE Team Emirates XRG.

== Teams ==
All 18 UCI WorldTeams and four UCI ProTeams made up the 22 teams that participated in the race.

UCI WorldTeams

- Alpecin–Premier Tech
- Decathlon CMA CGM
- EF Education–EasyPost
- Groupama–FDJ United
- Lidl–Trek
- Lotto–Intermarché
- Movistar Team
- Netcompany INEOS
- NSN Cycling Team
- Red Bull–Bora–Hansgrohe
- Soudal–Quick-Step
- Team Bahrain Victorious
- Team Jayco–AlUla
- Team Picnic–PostNL
- Visma–Lease a Bike
- UAE Team Emirates XRG
- Uno-X Mobility
- XDS Astana Team

UCI ProTeams

- Caja Rural–Seguros RGA
- Cofidis
- Team TotalEnergies
- Tudor Pro Cycling Team

== Route ==
Stage characteristics and winners
Stage	Date	Course	Distance	Type	Stage winner
1	7 June	Vizille to Saint-Ismier	146.2 km (90.8 mi)	Medium-mountain stage	Alex Baudin (FRA)
2	8 June	Saint-Martin-le-Vinoux to Le Puy-en-Velay	234.3 km (145.6 mi)	Hilly stage	Anthon Charmig (DEN)
3	9 June	Perreux to Perreux	28.4 km (17.6 mi)	Team time trial	(Netherlands) Visma–Lease a Bike
4	10 June	Le Puy-en-Velay to Montrond-les-Bains	167.4 km (104.0 mi)	Hilly stage	Quinn Simmons (USA)
5	11 June	Saint-Chamond to Parc des Oiseaux - Villard-les-Dombes	195.8 km (121.7 mi)	Hilly stage	Wout Van Aert (BEL)
6	12 June	Saint-Vulbas to Crest-Voland	182.3 km (113.3 mi)	Mountain stage	Maxim Van Gils (BEL)
7	13 June	La Bridoire to Grand Colombier	133.6 km (83.0 mi)	Mountain stage	Isaac del Toro (MEX)
8	14 June	Beaufort to Plateau de Solaison - Brison	120.1 km (74.6 mi)	Mountain stage	Isaac del Toro (MEX)
Total			1,208.1 km (750.7 mi)		

== Stages ==
=== Stage 1 ===
7 June 2026 — Vizille to Saint-Ismier, 146.2 km (90.8 mi)

Stage 1 Result
Rank	Rider	Team	Time
1	Alex Baudin (FRA)	EF Education–EasyPost	3h 43' 58"
2	Ramses Debruyne (BEL)	Alpecin–Premier Tech	+ 32"
3	Léo Bisiaux (FRA)	Decathlon CMA CGM	+ 32"
4	Kevin Vermaerke (USA)	UAE Team Emirates XRG	+ 32"
5	Rudy Molard (FRA)	Groupama–FDJ United	+ 32"
6	Ben Tulett (GBR)	Visma–Lease a Bike	+ 32"
7	Luke Plapp (AUS)	Team Jayco–AlUla	+ 32"
8	Luke Tuckwell (AUS)	Red Bull–Bora–Hansgrohe	+ 32"
9	Kévin Vauquelin (FRA)	Netcompany INEOS	+ 32"
10	Oscar Onley (GBR)	Netcompany INEOS	+ 32"

General classification after Stage 1
Rank	Rider	Team	Time
1	Alex Baudin (FRA)	EF Education–EasyPost	3h 43' 58"
2	Ramses Debruyne (BEL)	Alpecin–Premier Tech	+ 32"
3	Léo Bisiaux (FRA)	Decathlon CMA CGM	+ 32"
4	Kevin Vermaerke (USA)	UAE Team Emirates XRG	+ 32"
5	Rudy Molard (FRA)	Groupama–FDJ United	+ 32"
6	Ben Tulett (GBR)	Visma–Lease a Bike	+ 32"
7	Luke Plapp (AUS)	Team Jayco–AlUla	+ 32"
8	Luke Tuckwell (AUS)	Red Bull–Bora–Hansgrohe	+ 32"
9	Kévin Vauquelin (FRA)	Netcompany INEOS	+ 32"
10	Oscar Onley (GBR)	Netcompany INEOS	+ 32"

=== Stage 2 ===
8 June 2026 – Saint-Martin-le-Vinoux to Le Puy-en-Velay, 234.3 km (145.6 mi)

Stage 2 Result
Rank	Rider	Team	Time
1	Anthon Charmig (DEN)	Uno-X Mobility	5h 40' 29"
2	Henri-François Renard-Haquin (FRA)	Team Picnic–PostNL	+ 41"
3	Vlad Van Mechelen (BEL)	Team Bahrain Victorious	+ 41"
4	Raúl García Pierna (ESP)	Movistar Team	+ 43"
5	Clément Braz Afonso (FRA)	Groupama–FDJ United	+ 44"
6	Benjamin Thomas (FRA)	Cofidis	+ 1' 56"
7	Jordan Jegat (FRA)	Team TotalEnergies	+ 1' 59"
8	Nadav Raisberg (ISR)	NSN Cycling Team	+ 2' 10"
9	Finn Fisher-Black (NZL)	Red Bull–Bora–Hansgrohe	+ 3' 13"
10	Maxim Van Gils (BEL)	Red Bull–Bora–Hansgrohe	+ 3' 13"

General classification after Stage 2
Rank	Rider	Team	Time
1	Alex Baudin (FRA)	EF Education–EasyPost	9h 27' 40"
2	Ramses Debruyne (BEL)	Alpecin–Premier Tech	+ 32"
3	Kevin Vermaerke (USA)	UAE Team Emirates XRG	+ 32"
4	Léo Bisiaux (FRA)	Decathlon CMA CGM	+ 32"
5	Ben Tulett (GBR)	Visma–Lease a Bike	+ 32"
6	Luke Tuckwell (AUS)	Red Bull–Bora–Hansgrohe	+ 32"
7	Kévin Vauquelin (FRA)	Netcompany INEOS	+ 32"
8	Oscar Onley (GBR)	Netcompany INEOS	+ 32"
9	Rudy Molard (FRA)	Groupama–FDJ United	+ 32"
10	Luke Plapp (AUS)	Team Jayco–AlUla	+ 32"

=== Stage 3 ===
9 June 2026 – Perreux to Perreux (TTT), 28.4 km (17.6 mi)

Stage 3 Result
Rank	Team	Time
1	(Netherlands) Visma–Lease a Bike	32' 52"
2	(United Kingdom) Netcompany INEOS	+ 9"
3	(United States) EF Education–EasyPost	+ 29"
4	(Germany) Lidl–Trek	+ 32"
5	(Germany) Red Bull–Bora–Hansgrohe	+ 41"
6	(France) Decathlon CMA CGM	+ 45"
7	(Spain) Movistar Team	+ 52"
8	(Australia) Team Jayco–AlUla	+ 54"
9	(United Arab Emirates) UAE Team Emirates XRG	+ 1' 01"
10	Team Bahrain Victorious	+ 1' 06"

General classification after Stage 3
Rank	Rider	Team	Time
1	Alex Baudin (FRA)	EF Education–EasyPost	10h 01' 01"
2	Kévin Vauquelin (FRA)	Netcompany INEOS	+ 12"
3	Oscar Onley (GBR)	Netcompany INEOS	+ 12"
4	Matteo Jorgenson (USA)	Visma–Lease a Bike	+ 15"
5	Juan Ayuso (ESP)	Lidl–Trek	+ 47"
6	Mattias Skjelmose (DEN)	Lidl–Trek	+ 47"
7	Jørgen Nordhagen (NOR)	Visma–Lease a Bike	+ 50"
8	Maxim Van Gils (BEL)	Red Bull–Bora–Hansgrohe	+ 56"
9	Bruno Armirail (FRA)	Visma–Lease a Bike	+ 57"
10	Carlos Rodríguez (ESP)	Netcompany INEOS	+ 57"

=== Stage 4 ===
10 June 2026 – Le Puy-en-Velay to Montrond-les-Bains, 167.4 km (104.0 mi)

Stage 4 Result
Rank	Rider	Team	Time
1	Quinn Simmons (USA)	Lidl–Trek	3h 34' 08"
2	Finn Fisher-Black (NZL)	Red Bull–Bora–Hansgrohe	+ 0"
3	Mattéo Vercher (FRA)	Team TotalEnergies	+ 0"
4	Marco Frigo (ITA)	NSN Cycling Team	+ 0"
5	Raúl García Pierna (ESP)	Movistar Team	+ 0"
6	Andreas Kron (DEN)	Uno-X Mobility	+ 0"
7	Jordan Jegat (FRA)	Team TotalEnergies	+ 0"
8	Lars Craps (BEL)	Lotto–Intermarché	+ 0"
9	Jan Castellon (ESP)	Caja Rural–Seguros RGA	+ 0"
10	Pablo Castrillo (ESP)	Movistar Team	+ 4"

General classification after Stage 4
Rank	Rider	Team	Time
1	Alex Baudin (FRA)	EF Education–EasyPost	13h 35' 13"
2	Kévin Vauquelin (FRA)	Netcompany INEOS	+ 12"
3	Oscar Onley (GBR)	Netcompany INEOS	+ 12"
4	Matteo Jorgenson (USA)	Visma–Lease a Bike	+ 15"
5	Juan Ayuso (ESP)	Lidl–Trek	+ 47"
6	Mattias Skjelmose (DEN)	Lidl–Trek	+ 47"
7	Jørgen Nordhagen (NOR)	Visma–Lease a Bike	+ 50"
8	Carlos Rodríguez (ESP)	Netcompany INEOS	+ 57"
9	Léo Bisiaux (FRA)	Decathlon CMA CGM	+ 59"
10	Paul Seixas (FRA)	Decathlon CMA CGM	+ 1' 00"

=== Stage 5 ===
11 June 2026 – Saint-Chamond to Parc des Oiseaux - Villard-les-Dombes, 195.8 km (121.7 mi)

Stage 5 Result
Rank	Rider	Team	Time
1	Wout van Aert (BEL)	Visma–Lease a Bike	4h 31' 59"
2	Hugo Hofstetter (FRA)	NSN Cycling Team	+ 0"
3	Phil Bauhaus (GER)	Team Bahrain Victorious	+ 0"
4	Vito Braet (BEL)	Lotto–Intermarché	+ 0"
5	Henri-François Renard-Haquin (FRA)	Team Picnic–PostNL	+ 0"
6	Dorian Godon (FRA)	Netcompany INEOS	+ 0"
7	Nadav Raisberg (ISR)	NSN Cycling Team	+ 0"
8	Henri Uhlig (GER)	Alpecin–Premier Tech	+ 0"
9	Bryan Coquard (FRA)	Cofidis	+ 0"
10	Matteo Trentin (ITA)	Tudor Pro Cycling Team	+ 0"

General classification after Stage 5
Rank	Rider	Team	Time
1	Alex Baudin (FRA)	EF Education–EasyPost	18h 07' 12"
2	Kévin Vauquelin (FRA)	Netcompany INEOS	+ 12"
3	Oscar Onley (GBR)	Netcompany INEOS	+ 12"
4	Matteo Jorgenson (USA)	Visma–Lease a Bike	+ 15"
5	Juan Ayuso (ESP)	Lidl–Trek	+ 47"
6	Mattias Skjelmose (DEN)	Lidl–Trek	+ 47"
7	Jørgen Nordhagen (NOR)	Visma–Lease a Bike	+ 50"
8	Carlos Rodríguez (ESP)	Netcompany INEOS	+ 57"
9	Léo Bisiaux (FRA)	Decathlon CMA CGM	+ 59"
10	Paul Seixas (FRA)	Decathlon CMA CGM	+ 1' 00"

=== Stage 6 ===
12 June 2026 – Saint-Vulbas to Crest-Voland, 182.3 km (113.3 mi)

Stage 6 Result
Rank	Rider	Team	Time
1	Maxim Van Gils (BEL)	Red Bull–Bora–Hansgrohe	4h 06' 34"
2	Tobias Halland Johannessen (NOR)	Uno-X Mobility	+ 0"
3	Luke Tuckwell (AUS)	Red Bull–Bora–Hansgrohe	+ 6"
4	Pablo Torres (ESP)	UAE Team Emirates XRG	+ 13"
5	Raúl García Pierna (ESP)	Movistar Team	+ 33"
6	Yannis Voisard (SUI)	Tudor Pro Cycling Team	+ 33"
7	Jordan Jegat (FRA)	Team TotalEnergies	+ 33"
8	Cristián Rodríguez (ESP)	XDS Astana Team	+ 33"
9	Clément Braz Afonso (FRA)	Groupama–FDJ United	+ 33"
10	Lennart Jasch (GER)	Tudor Pro Cycling Team	+ 33"

General classification after Stage 6
Rank	Rider	Team	Time
1	Luke Tuckwell (AUS)	Red Bull–Bora–Hansgrohe	22h 14' 55"
2	Bruno Armirail (FRA)	Visma–Lease a Bike	+ 1' 12"
3	Guillaume Martin (FRA)	Groupama–FDJ United	+ 2' 00"
4	Matteo Jorgenson (USA)	Visma–Lease a Bike	+ 2' 34"
5	Cristián Rodríguez (ESP)	XDS Astana Team	+ 2' 37"
6	José Félix Parra (ESP)	Caja Rural–Seguros RGA	+ 3' 04"
7	Paul Seixas (FRA)	Decathlon CMA CGM	+ 3' 06"
8	Juan Ayuso (ESP)	Lidl–Trek	+ 3' 15"
9	Mattias Skjelmose (DEN)	Lidl–Trek	+ 3' 15"
10	Isaac del Toro (MEX)	UAE Team Emirates XRG	+ 3' 22"

=== Stage 7 ===
13 June 2026 – La Bridoire to Grand Colombier, 133.6 km (83.0 mi)

Stage 7 Result
Rank	Rider	Team	Time
1	Isaac del Toro (MEX)	UAE Team Emirates XRG	3h 41' 41"
2	Juan Ayuso (ESP)	Lidl–Trek	+ 24"
3	Tobias Halland Johannessen (NOR)	Uno-X Mobility	+ 38"
4	Matteo Jorgenson (USA)	Visma–Lease a Bike	+ 41"
5	Cian Uijtdebroeks (BEL)	Movistar Team	+ 41"
6	Mattias Skjelmose (DEN)	Lidl–Trek	+ 1' 17"
7	Paul Seixas (FRA)	Decathlon CMA CGM	+ 1' 21"
8	Cristián Rodríguez (ESP)	XDS Astana Team	+ 2' 29"
9	José Félix Parra (ESP)	Caja Rural–Seguros RGA	+ 2' 31"
10	Jan Castellon (ESP)	Caja Rural–Seguros RGA	+ 2' 33"

General classification after Stage 7
Rank	Rider	Team	Time
1	Luke Tuckwell (AUS)	Red Bull–Bora–Hansgrohe	25h 59' 09"
2	Matteo Jorgenson (USA)	Visma–Lease a Bike	+ 42"
3	Isaac del Toro (MEX)	UAE Team Emirates XRG	+ 49"
4	Juan Ayuso (ESP)	Lidl–Trek	+ 1' 06"
5	Tobias Halland Johannessen (NOR)	Uno-X Mobility	+ 1' 33"
6	Paul Seixas (FRA)	Decathlon CMA CGM	+ 1' 54"
7	Mattias Skjelmose (DEN)	Lidl–Trek	+ 1' 59"
8	Cian Uijtdebroeks (BEL)	Movistar Team	+ 2' 17"
9	Cristián Rodríguez (ESP)	XDS Astana Team	+ 2' 33"
10	José Félix Parra (ESP)	Caja Rural–Seguros RGA	+ 3' 02"

=== Stage 8 ===
14 June 2026 – Beaufort to Plateau de Solaison - Brison, 120.1 km (74.6 mi)

Stage 8 Result
Rank	Rider	Team	Time
1	Isaac del Toro (MEX)	UAE Team Emirates XRG	3h 35' 07"
2	Juan Ayuso (ESP)	Lidl–Trek	+ 1' 00"
3	Tobias Halland Johannessen (NOR)	Uno-X Mobility	+ 1' 02"
4	Mattias Skjelmose (DEN)	Lidl–Trek	+ 1' 31"
5	Cristián Rodríguez (ESP)	XDS Astana Team	+ 1' 31"
6	Carlos Rodríguez (ESP)	Netcompany INEOS	+ 1' 36"
7	Maxim Van Gils (BEL)	Red Bull–Bora–Hansgrohe	+ 1' 43"
8	Luke Tuckwell (AUS)	Red Bull–Bora–Hansgrohe	+ 1' 43"
9	Cian Uijtdebroeks (BEL)	Movistar Team	+ 1' 43"
10	Matteo Jorgenson (USA)	Visma–Lease a Bike	+ 1' 43"

Final general classification
Rank	Rider	Team	Time
1	Isaac del Toro (MEX)	UAE Team Emirates XRG	29h 35' 05"
2	Luke Tuckwell (AUS)	Red Bull–Bora–Hansgrohe	+ 54"
3	Juan Ayuso (ESP)	Lidl–Trek	+ 1' 17"
4	Matteo Jorgenson (USA)	Visma–Lease a Bike	+ 1' 36"
5	Tobias Halland Johannessen (NOR)	Uno-X Mobility	+ 1' 46"
6	Mattias Skjelmose (DEN)	Lidl–Trek	+ 2' 41"
7	Cian Uijtdebroeks (BEL)	Movistar Team	+ 3' 11"
8	Cristián Rodríguez (ESP)	XDS Astana Team	+ 3' 15"
9	José Félix Parra (ESP)	Caja Rural–Seguros RGA	+ 6' 25"
10	Guillaume Martin (FRA)	Groupama–FDJ United	+ 7' 21"

== Classification leadership table ==
Classification leadership by stage
Stage	Winner	General classification	Points classification	Mountains classification	Young rider classification	Team classification	Combativity award
1	Alex Baudin	Alex Baudin	Alex Baudin (Note: On stage 2, Ramses Debruyne, who was second in the points classification, wore the green jersey, because first placed Alex Baudin wore the yellow jersey as leader of the general classification.)	Alex Baudin (Note: On stage 2, Sergio Samitier, who was second in the mountains classification, wore the polkadot jersey, because first placed Alex Baudin wore the yellow jersey as leader of the general classification.)	Alex Baudin (Note: On stage 2, Léo Bisiaux, who was third in the young rider classification, wore the white jersey, because first placed Alex Baudin wore the yellow jersey as leader of the general classification and second placed Ramses Debruyne wore the green jersey.) (Note: On stage 3, Ramses Debruyne, who was second in the young rider classification, wore the white jersey, because first placed Alex Baudin wore the yellow jersey as leader of the general classification. On stages 4–6, Kévin Vauquelin wore the white jersey for the same reason.)	Visma–Lease a Bike	Alex Baudin
2	Anthon Charmig	Alex Baudin	Nadav Raisberg	Clément Braz Afonso	Alex Baudin	Groupama–FDJ United	Clément Braz Afonso
3	Visma–Lease a Bike	Alex Baudin	Nadav Raisberg	Clément Braz Afonso	Alex Baudin	Groupama–FDJ United	not awarded
4	Quinn Simmons	Alex Baudin	Nadav Raisberg	Clément Braz Afonso	Alex Baudin	Groupama–FDJ United	Jordan Jegat
5	Wout van Aert	Alex Baudin	Nadav Raisberg	Clément Braz Afonso	Alex Baudin	Groupama–FDJ United	Pepijn Reinderink
6	Maxim Van Gils	Luke Tuckwell	Nadav Raisberg	Clément Braz Afonso	Luke Tuckwell (Note: On stage 7, Paul Seixas, who was second in the young rider classification, wore the white jersey, because first placed Luke Tuckwell wore the yellow jersey as leader of the general classification.) (Note: On stage 8, Juan Ayuso, who was third in the young rider classification, wore the white jersey, because first placed Luke Tuckwell wore the yellow jersey as leader of the general classification and second placed Isaac del Toro wore the Mexican champion jersey.)	Groupama–FDJ United	Anders Skaarseth
7	Isaac del Toro	Luke Tuckwell	Nadav Raisberg	Clément Braz Afonso	Luke Tuckwell	Lidl–Trek	Paul Seixas
8	Isaac del Toro	Isaac del Toro	Nadav Raisberg	Clément Braz Afonso	Isaac del Toro	Visma–Lease a Bike	Valentin Paret-Peintre
Final		Isaac del Toro	Nadav Raisberg	Clément Braz Afonso	Isaac del Toro	Visma–Lease a Bike	

== Classification standings ==
Legend
Denotes the winner of the general classification	Denotes the winner of the young rider classification
Denotes the winner of the points classification	Denotes the winner of the team classification
Denotes the winner of the mountains classification	Denotes the winner of the combativity award

=== General classification ===
FInal general classification (1–10)
Rank	Rider	Team	Time
1	Isaac del Toro (MEX)	UAE Team Emirates XRG	29h 35' 05"
2	Luke Tuckwell (AUS)	Red Bull–Bora–Hansgrohe	+ 54"
3	Juan Ayuso (ESP)	Lidl–Trek	+ 1' 17"
4	Matteo Jorgenson (USA)	Visma–Lease a Bike	+ 1' 36"
5	Tobias Halland Johannessen (NOR)	Uno-X Mobility	+ 1' 46"
6	Mattias Skjelmose (DEN)	Lidl–Trek	+ 2' 41"
7	Cian Uijtdebroeks (BEL)	Movistar Team	+ 3' 11"
8	Cristián Rodríguez (ESP)	XDS Astana Team	+ 3' 15"
9	José Félix Parra (ESP)	Caja Rural–Seguros RGA	+ 6' 25"
10	Guillaume Martin (FRA)	Groupama–FDJ United	+ 7' 21"

=== Points classification ===
Final points classification (1–10)
Rank	Rider	Team	Points
1	Nadav Raisberg (ISR)	NSN Cycling Team	62
2	Raúl García Pierna (ESP)	Movistar Team	46
3	Henri-François Renard-Haquin (FRA)	Team Picnic–PostNL	38
4	Jordan Jegat (FRA)	Team TotalEnergies	34
5	Tobias Halland Johannessen (NOR)	Uno-X Mobility	32
6	Isaac del Toro (MEX)	UAE Team Emirates XRG	30
7	Maxim Van Gils (BEL)	Red Bull–Bora–Hansgrohe	25
8	Quinn Simmons (USA)	Lidl–Trek	25
9	Anthon Charmig (DEN)	Uno-X Mobility	25
10	Juan Ayuso (ESP)	Lidl–Trek	24

=== Mountains classification ===
Final mountains classification (1–10)
Rank	Rider	Team	Points
1	Clément Braz Afonso (FRA)	Groupama–FDJ United	71
2	Isaac del Toro (MEX)	UAE Team Emirates XRG	36
3	Carlos Rodríguez (ESP)	Netcompany INEOS	32
4	Tobias Halland Johannessen (NOR)	Uno-X Mobility	31
5	Laurens De Plus (BEL)	Netcompany INEOS	30
6	Valentin Paret-Peintre (FRA)	Soudal–Quick-Step	27
7	Juan Ayuso (ESP)	Lidl–Trek	25
8	Clément Berthet (FRA)	Groupama–FDJ United	20
9	Harold Tejada (COL)	XDS Astana Team	16
10	Alex Baudin (FRA)	EF Education–EasyPost	14

=== Young rider classification ===
Final young rider classification (1–10)
Rank	Rider	Team	Time
1	Isaac del Toro (MEX)	UAE Team Emirates XRG	29h 35' 05"
2	Luke Tuckwell (AUS)	Red Bull–Bora–Hansgrohe	+ 54"
3	Juan Ayuso (ESP)	Lidl–Trek	+ 1' 17"
4	Cian Uijtdebroeks (BEL)	Movistar Team	+ 3' 11"
5	Jan Castellon (ESP)	Caja Rural–Seguros RGA	+ 9' 46"
6	Alex Baudin (FRA)	EF Education–EasyPost	+ 11' 07"
7	Ramses Debruyne (BEL)	Alpecin–Premier Tech	+ 11' 51"
8	Lars Craps (BEL)	Lotto–Intermarché	+ 12' 27"
9	Kévin Vauquelin (FRA)	Netcompany INEOS	+ 12' 43"
10	Ben Tulett (GBR)	Visma–Lease a Bike	+ 14' 28"

=== Team classification ===
Final team classification (1–10)
Rank	Team	Time
1	(Netherlands) Visma–Lease a Bike	89h 17' 24"
2	(Germany) Lidl–Trek	+ 29"
3	(France) Groupama–FDJ United	+ 2' 20"
4	(United Arab Emirates) UAE Team Emirates XRG	+ 16' 14"
5	(Kazakhstan) XDS Astana Team	+ 20' 35"
6	(Norway) Uno-X Mobility	+ 37' 11"
7	(United Kingdom) Netcompany INEOS	+ 37' 30"
8	(Germany) Red Bull–Bora–Hansgrohe	+ 46' 24"
9	(United States) EF Education–EasyPost	+ 47' 44"
10	(France) Decathlon CMA CGM	+ 50' 48"
