= 2026 European Road Championships – Men's road race =

Men's road race
2026 European Road Championships

Race details
- Dates: 4 October 2026
- Stages: 1
- Distance: 196.2 km (121.9 mi)
- Winning time: 4:16:37

Medalists
	Gold	Remco Evenepoel (BEL)
	Silver	Giulio Ciccone (ITA)
	Bronze	Christian Scaroni (ITA)

The men's elite road race at the 2026 European Road Championships took place on 4 October 2026, in Ljubljana, Slovenia.

== Results ==
Rank	#	Cyclist	Nation	Time / Diff.
1st place, gold medalist(s)	4	Remco Evenepoel	Belgium	4:16:37
2nd place, silver medalist(s)	33	Giulio Ciccone	Italy	s.t.
3rd place, bronze medalist(s)	39	Christian Scaroni	Italy	+0:59
4	86	Toms Skujiņš	Latvia	+1:13
5	46	Iván Romeo	Spain	+1:16
6	3	Ramses Debruyne	Belgium	s.t.
7	63	Emil Herzog	Germany	s.t.
8	6	Maxim Van Gils	Belgium	s.t.
9	11	Léo Bisiaux	France	+1:18
10	23	Primož Roglič	Slovenia	+1:19
11	14	Mathys Rondel	France	+1:27
12	13	Romain Grégoire	France	+2:08
13	22	Jakob Omrzel	Slovenia	s.t.
14	16	Kévin Vauquelin	France	s.t.
15	58	Marc Hirschi	Switzerland	s.t.
16	29	Mikkel Frølich Honoré	Denmark	s.t.
17	9	Alex Baudin	France	s.t.
18	15	Pavel Sivakov	France	+2:15
19	24	Jan Tratnik	Slovenia	+2:47
20	67	Michael Gogl	Austria	s.t.
21	83	Aleksandr Vlasov	Individual Neutral Athletes	s.t.
22	43	Pau Miquel	Spain	s.t.
23	65	Max Schachmann	Germany	s.t.
24	48	Tijmen Graat	Netherlands	s.t.
25	42	Urko Berrade	Spain	+2:50
26	40	Diego Ulissi	Italy	+3:07
27	73	Nelson Oliveira	Portugal	s.t.
28	56	Jan Christen	Switzerland	s.t.
29	70	Marco Schrettl	Austria	+4:47
30	53	Senna Remijn	Netherlands	s.t.
31	37	Giulio Pellizzari	Italy	+6:49
32	12	Clément Braz Afonso	France	s.t.
33	20	Matej Mohorič	Slovenia	+8:13
34	79	Mateusz Gajdulewicz	Poland	s.t.
35	28	Peter Øxenberg	Denmark	+8:14
36	31	Mads Pedersen	Denmark	s.t.
37	61	Marco Brenner	Germany	s.t.
38	115	Victor Langellotti	Monaco	+12:14
39	10	Julien Bernard	France	+12:19
40	54	Jardi van der Lee	Netherlands	s.t.
41	36	Marco Frigo	Italy	s.t.
42	69	Philipp Hofbauer	Austria	+13:30
43	68	Alexander Hajek	Austria	s.t.
44	50	Gijs Leemreize	Netherlands	s.t.
45	59	Fabian Weiss	Switzerland	+14:09
46	32	Frederik Wandahl	Denmark	s.t.
47	72	Tiago Antunes	Portugal	s.t.
48	34	Ludovico Crescioli	Italy	s.t.
49	27	Anthon Charmig	Denmark	s.t.
50	80	Jakub Kaczmarek	Poland	+16:53
51	77	Dominik Neuman	Czechia	+18:03
52	66	Tobias Bayer	Austria	s.t.
53	93	Márk Valent	Hungary	s.t.
54	92	János Pelikán	Hungary	s.t.
55	109	Axel Källberg	Finland	s.t.
56	60	Johannes Adamietz	Germany	s.t.
57	57	Valentin Darbellay	Switzerland	s.t.
58	81	Filip Maciejuk	Poland	s.t.
59	103	Burak Abay	Turkey	s.t.
60	51	Alex Molenaar	Netherlands	s.t.
61	98	Emiliano Vila	Italy	s.t.
62	71	Emanuel Zangerle	Austria	+18:08
63	47	Sjoerd Bax	Netherlands	s.t.
64	49	Jochem Kerckaert	Netherlands	s.t.
65	101	Mathieu Kockelmann	Luxembourg	s.t.
66	102	Mats Wenzel	Luxembourg	s.t.
DNF	1	Jenno Berckmoes	Belgium	
DNF	2	Sander De Pestel	Belgium	
DNF	5	Quinten Hermans	Belgium	
DNF	7	Ilan Van Wilder	Belgium	
DNF	8	Louis Vervaeke	Belgium	
DNF	17	Gal Glivar	Slovenia	
DNF	18	Matevž Govekar	Slovenia	
DNF	19	Luka Mezgec	Slovenia	
DNF	21	Domen Novak	Slovenia	
DNF	25	Kasper Asgreen	Denmark	
DNF	26	Mikkel Bjerg	Denmark	
DNF	30	Andreas Kron	Denmark	
DNF	35	Alessandro Fancellu	Italy	
DNF	38	Alessandro Pinarello	Italy	
DNF	41	Juan Ayuso	Spain	
DNF	44	Joel Nicolau	Spain	
DNF	45	Cristián Rodríguez	Spain	
DNF	52	Wouter Poels	Netherlands	
DNF	55	Fabio Christen	Switzerland	
DNF	62	John Degenkolb	Germany	
DNF	64	Miguel Heidemann	Germany	
DNF	74	Afonso Silva	Portugal	
DNF	75	Pedro Silva	Portugal	
DNF	76	Josef Černý	Czechia	
DNF	82	Piotr Pękala	Poland	
DNF	84	Kristiāns Belohvoščiks	Latvia	
DNF	85	Māris Bogdanovičs	Latvia	
DNF	87	Jovan Divnić	Serbia	
DNF	88	Marko Stanković	Serbia	
DNF	89	Heorhii Antonenko	Ukraine	
DNF	90	Jakob Söderqvist	Sweden	
DNF	91	Zsombor Palumby	Hungary	
DNF	94	Catalin Buta	Romania	
DNF	95	Gerhard-Cristin Moldansky	Romania	
DNF	96	Mattew-Denis Piciu	Romania	
DNF	97	Miltiadis Giannoutsos	Greece	
DNF	99	Kévin Geniets	Luxembourg	
DNF	100	Alex Kirsch	Luxembourg	
DNF	104	Ahmet Akpinar	Turkey	
DNF	105	Samet Bulut	Turkey	
DNF	106	Serdar Anıl Depe	Turkey	
DNF	107	Mustafa Tekin	Turkey	
DNF	108	Andreas Miltiadis	Cyprus	
DNF	110	Borislav Palashev	Bulgaria	
DNF	111	Shahin Eyvazov	Azerbaijan	
DNF	112	Nofal Nuriyev	Azerbaijan	
DNF	113	Kristinn Jónsson	Iceland	
DNF	114	Ghennadii Morgun	Moldova	
DNS	78	Mathias Vacek	Czechia	
