= 2026 Tour of the Basque Country =

Spanish cycling race

2026 UCI World Tour, race 15 of 36

Race details
- Dates: 6–11 April 2026
- Stages: 6
- Distance: 810.1 km (503.4 mi)
- Winning time: 20h 07' 35"

Results
Jersey awarded to the overall winner	Winner	Paul Seixas (FRA)	(Decathlon CMA CGM)
	Second	Florian Lipowitz (GER)	(Red Bull–Bora–Hansgrohe)
	Third	Tobias Halland Johannessen (NOR)	(Uno-X Mobility)
Jersey awarded to the points classification winner	Points	Paul Seixas (FRA)	(Decathlon CMA CGM)
Jersey awarded to the mountains classification winner	Mountains	Paul Seixas (FRA)	(Decathlon CMA CGM)
Jersey awarded to the young rider classification winner	Young rider	Paul Seixas (FRA)	(Decathlon CMA CGM)
Jersey awarded to the team classification winner	Team	(Spain) Movistar Team	

The 2026 Tour of the Basque Country (officially known as Itzulia Basque Country 2026) was a road cycling stage race that took place between 6 and 11 April in the Basque region in northern Spain. It was the 65th edition of the Tour of the Basque Country and the 15th race of the 2026 UCI World Tour.

== Teams ==
Sixteen UCI WorldTeams and six UCI ProTeams made up the 22 teams that participated in the race.

UCI WorldTeams

- Alpecin–Premier Tech
- Decathlon CMA CGM
- EF Education–EasyPost
- Groupama–FDJ United
- INEOS Grenadiers
- Lotto–Intermarché
- Lidl–Trek
- Movistar Team
- Red Bull–Bora–Hansgrohe
- Soudal–Quick-Step
- Team Bahrain Victorious
- Team Picnic–PostNL
- UAE Team Emirates XRG
- Uno-X Mobility
- Visma–Lease a Bike
- XDS Astana Team

UCI ProTeams

- Burgos Burpellet BH
- Caja Rural–Seguros RGA
- Cofidis
- Equipo Kern Pharma
- Euskaltel–Euskadi
- Tudor Pro Cycling Team

== Route ==
Stage characteristics and winners
Stage	Date	Course	Distance	Type	Winner
1	6 April	Bilbao to Bilbao	13.8 km (8.6 mi)	Individual time trial	Paul Seixas (FRA)
2	7 April	Pamplona-Iruña to Cuevas de Mendukilo	164.1 km (102.0 mi)	Mountain stage	Paul Seixas (FRA)
3	8 April	Basauri to Basauri	152.8 km (94.9 mi)	Hilly stage	Axel Laurance (FRA)
4	9 April	Galdakao to Galdakao	167.2 km (103.9 mi)	Hilly stage	Alex Aranburu (ESP)
5	10 April	Eibar to Eibar	176.2 km (109.5 mi)	Medium mountain stage	Paul Seixas (FRA)
6	11 April	Goizper-Antzuola to Bergara	135.4 km (84.1 mi)	Medium mountain stage	Andrew August (USA)
Total			810.1 km (503.4 mi)		

== Stages ==
=== Stage 1 ===
6 April 2026 — Bilbao to Bilbao, 13.8 km (8.6 mi) (ITT)

Stage 1 Result
Rank	Rider	Team	Time
1	Paul Seixas (FRA)	Decathlon CMA CGM	17' 09"
2	Kévin Vauquelin (FRA)	INEOS Grenadiers	+ 23"
3	Felix Großschartner (AUT)	UAE Team Emirates XRG	+ 27"
4	Primož Roglič (SLO)	Red Bull–Bora–Hansgrohe	+ 28"
5	Ilan Van Wilder (BEL)	Soudal–Quick-Step	+ 29"
6	Florian Lipowitz (GER)	Red Bull–Bora–Hansgrohe	+ 33"
7	Andrew August (USA)	INEOS Grenadiers	+ 40"
8	Brandon McNulty (USA)	UAE Team Emirates XRG	+ 43"
9	Mattias Skjelmose (DEN)	Lidl–Trek	+ 45"
10	Michael Leonard (CAN)	EF Education–EasyPost	+ 46"

General classification after Stage 1
Rank	Rider	Team	Time
1	Paul Seixas (FRA)	Decathlon CMA CGM	17' 09"
2	Kévin Vauquelin (FRA)	INEOS Grenadiers	+ 23"
3	Felix Großschartner (AUT)	UAE Team Emirates XRG	+ 27"
4	Primož Roglič (SLO)	Red Bull–Bora–Hansgrohe	+ 28"
5	Ilan Van Wilder (BEL)	Soudal–Quick-Step	+ 29"
6	Florian Lipowitz (GER)	Red Bull–Bora–Hansgrohe	+ 33"
7	Andrew August (USA)	INEOS Grenadiers	+ 40"
8	Brandon McNulty (USA)	UAE Team Emirates XRG	+ 43"
9	Mattias Skjelmose (DEN)	Lidl–Trek	+ 45"
10	Michael Leonard (CAN)	EF Education–EasyPost	+ 46"

=== Stage 2 ===
7 April 2026 — Pamplona-Iruña to Cuevas de Mendukilo, 164.1 km (102.0 mi)

Stage 2 Result
Rank	Rider	Team	Time
1	Paul Seixas (FRA)	Decathlon CMA CGM	4h 11' 48"
2	Mattias Skjelmose (DEN)	Lidl–Trek	+ 1' 25"
3	Primož Roglič (SLO)	Red Bull–Bora–Hansgrohe	+ 1' 25"
4	Cian Uijtdebroeks (BEL)	Movistar Team	+ 1' 25"
5	Ben Tulett (GBR)	Visma–Lease a Bike	+ 1' 25"
6	Alex Baudin (FRA)	EF Education–EasyPost	+ 1' 25"
7	Ion Izagirre (ESP)	Cofidis	+ 1' 25"
8	Florian Lipowitz (GER)	Red Bull–Bora–Hansgrohe	+ 1' 25"
9	Clément Champoussin (FRA)	XDS Astana Team	+ 1' 31"
10	Harold Tejada (COL)	XDS Astana Team	+ 1' 43"

General classification after Stage 2
Rank	Rider	Team	Time
1	Paul Seixas (FRA)	Decathlon CMA CGM	4h 27' 48"
2	Primož Roglič (SLO)	Red Bull–Bora–Hansgrohe	+ 1' 59"
3	Florian Lipowitz (GER)	Red Bull–Bora–Hansgrohe	+ 2' 08"
4	Mattias Skjelmose (DEN)	Lidl–Trek	+ 2' 14"
5	Ben Tulett (GBR)	Visma–Lease a Bike	+ 2' 27"
6	Alex Baudin (FRA)	EF Education–EasyPost	+ 2' 31"
7	Ion Izagirre (ESP)	Cofidis	+ 2' 36"
8	Isaac Del Toro (MEX)	UAE Team Emirates XRG	+ 2' 44"
9	Harold Tejada (COL)	XDS Astana Team	+ 2' 48"
10	Cian Uijtdebroeks (BEL)	Movistar Team	+ 3' 01"

=== Stage 3 ===
8 April 2026 — Basauri to Basauri, 152.8 km (94.9 mi)

Stage 3 Result
Rank	Rider	Team	Time
1	Axel Laurance (FRA)	INEOS Grenadiers	3h 38' 33"
2	Igor Arrieta (ESP)	UAE Team Emirates XRG	+ 2"
3	Natnael Tesfatsion (ERI)	Movistar Team	+ 14"
4	Ilan Van Wilder (BEL)	Soudal–Quick-Step	+ 14"
5	Tobias Halland Johannessen (NOR)	Uno-X Mobility	+ 18"
6	James Shaw (GBR)	EF Education–EasyPost	+ 21"
7	Clément Braz Afonso (FRA)	Groupama–FDJ United	+ 24"
8	Lorenzo Fortunato (ITA)	XDS Astana Team	+ 24"
9	Guillaume Martin (FRA)	Groupama–FDJ United	+ 24"
10	Reuben Thompson (NZL)	Lotto–Intermarché	+ 34"

General classification after Stage 3
Rank	Rider	Team	Time
1	Paul Seixas (FRA)	Decathlon CMA CGM	8h 08' 24"
2	Primož Roglič (SLO)	Red Bull–Bora–Hansgrohe	+ 1' 59"
3	Florian Lipowitz (GER)	Red Bull–Bora–Hansgrohe	+ 2' 08"
4	Mattias Skjelmose (DEN)	Lidl–Trek	+ 2' 14"
5	Ben Tulett (GBR)	Visma–Lease a Bike	+ 2' 27"
6	Alex Baudin (FRA)	EF Education–EasyPost	+ 2' 31"
7	Ion Izagirre (ESP)	Cofidis	+ 2' 36"
8	Harold Tejada (COL)	XDS Astana Team	+ 2' 48"
9	Cian Uijtdebroeks (BEL)	Movistar Team	+ 3' 01"
10	Clément Champoussin (FRA)	XDS Astana Team	+ 3' 02"

=== Stage 4 ===
9 April 2026 — Galdakao to Galdakao, 167.2 km (103.9 mi)

Stage 4 Result
Rank	Rider	Team	Time
1	Alex Aranburu (ESP)	Cofidis	3h 55' 15"
2	Tobias Halland Johannessen (NOR)	Uno-X Mobility	+ 4"
3	Christian Scaroni (ITA)	XDS Astana Team	+ 6"
4	Ion Izagirre (ESP)	Cofidis	+ 7"
5	Guillaume Martin (FRA)	Groupama–FDJ United	+ 13"
6	Pello Bilbao (ESP)	Team Bahrain Victorious	+ 14"
7	Juan Pedro López (ESP)	Movistar Team	+ 14"
8	Paul Seixas (FRA)	Decathlon CMA CGM	+ 14"
9	Lorenzo Fortunato (ITA)	XDS Astana Team	+ 17"
10	Igor Arrieta (ESP)	UAE Team Emirates XRG	+ 24"

General classification after Stage 4
Rank	Rider	Team	Time
1	Paul Seixas (FRA)	Decathlon CMA CGM	12h 03' 53"
2	Primož Roglič (SLO)	Red Bull–Bora–Hansgrohe	+ 2' 19"
3	Florian Lipowitz (GER)	Red Bull–Bora–Hansgrohe	+ 2' 28"
4	Ion Izagirre (ESP)	Cofidis	+ 2' 29"
5	Mattias Skjelmose (DEN)	Lidl–Trek	+ 2' 34"
6	Ben Tulett (GBR)	Visma–Lease a Bike	+ 2' 47"
7	Alex Baudin (FRA)	EF Education–EasyPost	+ 2' 51"
8	Harold Tejada (COL)	XDS Astana Team	+ 3' 08"
9	Cian Uijtdebroeks (BEL)	Movistar Team	+ 3' 21"
10	Clément Champoussin (FRA)	XDS Astana Team	+ 3' 22"

=== Stage 5 ===
10 April 2026 — Eibar to Eibar, 176.2 km (109.5 mi)

Stage 5 Result
Rank	Rider	Team	Time
1	Paul Seixas (FRA)	Decathlon CMA CGM	4h 30' 02"
2	Florian Lipowitz (GER)	Red Bull–Bora–Hansgrohe	+ 0"
3	Javier Romo (ESP)	Movistar Team	+ 1' 03"
4	Kévin Vauquelin (FRA)	INEOS Grenadiers	+ 1' 11"
5	Ion Izagirre (ESP)	Cofidis	+ 1' 11"
6	Harold Tejada (COL)	XDS Astana Team	+ 1' 11"
7	Tobias Halland Johannessen (NOR)	Uno-X Mobility	+ 1' 11"
8	Clément Champoussin (FRA)	XDS Astana Team	+ 1' 11"
9	Pello Bilbao (ESP)	Team Bahrain Victorious	+ 1' 11"
10	Alex Baudin (FRA)	EF Education–EasyPost	+ 1' 11"

General classification after Stage 5
Rank	Rider	Team	Time
1	Paul Seixas (FRA)	Decathlon CMA CGM	16h 33' 45"
2	Florian Lipowitz (GER)	Red Bull–Bora–Hansgrohe	+ 2' 30"
3	Primož Roglič (SLO)	Red Bull–Bora–Hansgrohe	+ 3' 40"
4	Ion Izagirre (ESP)	Cofidis	+ 3' 50"
5	Alex Baudin (FRA)	EF Education–EasyPost	+ 4' 12"
6	Harold Tejada (COL)	XDS Astana Team	+ 4' 29"
7	Cian Uijtdebroeks (BEL)	Movistar Team	+ 4' 42"
8	Clément Champoussin (FRA)	XDS Astana Team	+ 4' 43"
9	Pello Bilbao (ESP)	Team Bahrain Victorious	+ 5' 03"
10	Javier Romo (ESP)	Movistar Team	+ 5' 05"

=== Stage 6 ===
11 April 2026 — Goizper-Antzuola to Bergara, 135.4 km (84.1 mi)

Stage 6 Result
Rank	Rider	Team	Time
1	Andrew August (USA)	INEOS Grenadiers	3h 29' 35"
2	Raúl García Pierna (ESP)	Movistar Team	+ 16"
3	Frank van den Broek (NED)	Team Picnic–PostNL	+ 34"
4	Gal Glivar (SLO)	Alpecin–Premier Tech	+ 34"
5	Filippo Fiorelli (ITA)	Visma–Lease a Bike	+ 1' 07"
6	Emiel Verstrynge (BEL)	Alpecin–Premier Tech	+ 1' 07"
7	Simone Velasco (ITA)	XDS Astana Team	+ 1' 07"
8	Tobias Halland Johannessen (NOR)	Uno-X Mobility	+ 1' 09"
9	Ramses Debruyne (BEL)	Alpecin–Premier Tech	+ 1' 26"
10	Guillaume Martin (FRA)	Groupama–FDJ United	+ 1' 33"

General classification after Stage 6
Rank	Rider	Team	Time
1	Paul Seixas (FRA)	Decathlon CMA CGM	20h 07' 35"
2	Florian Lipowitz (GER)	Red Bull–Bora–Hansgrohe	+ 2' 30"
3	Tobias Halland Johannessen (NOR)	Uno-X Mobility	+ 2' 33"
4	Ion Izagirre (ESP)	Cofidis	+ 3' 50"
5	Clément Champoussin (FRA)	XDS Astana Team	+ 4' 43"
6	Pello Bilbao (ESP)	Team Bahrain Victorious	+ 5' 03"
7	Javier Romo (ESP)	Movistar Team	+ 5' 05"
8	Igor Arrieta (ESP)	UAE Team Emirates XRG	+ 5' 25"
9	Alex Baudin (FRA)	EF Education–EasyPost	+ 5' 41"
10	Kévin Vauquelin (FRA)	INEOS Grenadiers	+ 7' 33"

== Classification leadership table ==
Classification leadership by stage
Stage	Winner	General classification	Points classification	Mountains classification	Young rider classification	Basque rider classification	Team classification	Combativity award
1	Paul Seixas	Paul Seixas	Paul Seixas	Paul Seixas	Paul Seixas	Pello Bilbao	INEOS Grenadiers	Paul Seixas
2	Paul Seixas	Paul Seixas	Paul Seixas	Paul Seixas	Paul Seixas	Ion Izagirre	XDS Astana Team	Joan Bou
3	Axel Laurance	Paul Seixas	Paul Seixas	Joan Bou	Paul Seixas	Ion Izagirre	XDS Astana Team	Igor Arrieta
4	Alex Aranburu	Paul Seixas	Paul Seixas	Joan Bou	Paul Seixas	Ion Izagirre	XDS Astana Team	Anders Halland Johannessen
5	Paul Seixas	Paul Seixas	Paul Seixas	Paul Seixas	Paul Seixas	Ion Izagirre	XDS Astana Team	Ben Healy
6	Andrew August	Paul Seixas	Paul Seixas	Paul Seixas	Paul Seixas	Ion Izagirre	Movistar Team	Mattias Skjelmose
Final		Paul Seixas	Paul Seixas	Paul Seixas	Paul Seixas	Ion Izagirre	Movistar Team	Not awarded

== Classification standings ==
Legend
Denotes the winner of the general classification	Denotes the winner of the young rider classification
Denotes the winner of the points classification	Denotes the winner of the team classification
Denotes the winner of the mountains classification	Denotes the winner of the combativity award

=== General classification ===
Final general classification (1–10)
Rank	Rider	Team	Time
1	Paul Seixas (FRA)	Decathlon CMA CGM	20h 07' 35"
2	Florian Lipowitz (GER)	Red Bull–Bora–Hansgrohe	+ 2' 30"
3	Tobias Halland Johannessen (NOR)	Uno-X Mobility	+ 2' 33"
4	Ion Izagirre (ESP)	Cofidis	+ 3' 50"
5	Clément Champoussin (FRA)	XDS Astana Team	+ 4' 43"
6	Pello Bilbao (ESP)	Team Bahrain Victorious	+ 5' 03"
7	Javier Romo (ESP)	Movistar Team	+ 5' 05"
8	Igor Arrieta (ESP)	UAE Team Emirates XRG	+ 5' 25"
9	Alex Baudin (FRA)	EF Education–EasyPost	+ 5' 41"
10	Kévin Vauquelin (FRA)	INEOS Grenadiers	+ 7' 33"

=== Points classification ===
Final points classification (1–10)
Rank	Rider	Team	Points
1	Paul Seixas (FRA)	Decathlon CMA CGM	87
2	Tobias Halland Johannessen (NOR)	Uno-X Mobility	49
3	Florian Lipowitz (GER)	Red Bull–Bora–Hansgrohe	38
4	Igor Arrieta (ESP)	UAE Team Emirates XRG	36
5	Ion Izagirre (ESP)	Cofidis	35
6	Mattias Skjelmose (DEN)	Lidl–Trek	35
7	Andrew August (USA)	INEOS Grenadiers	34
8	Kévin Vauquelin (FRA)	INEOS Grenadiers	34
9	Primož Roglič (SLO)	Red Bull–Bora–Hansgrohe	34
10	Guillaume Martin (FRA)	Groupama–FDJ United	25

=== Mountains classification ===
Final mountains classification (1–10)
Rank	Rider	Team	Points
1	Paul Seixas (FRA)	Decathlon CMA CGM	32
2	Marc Soler (ESP)	UAE Team Emirates XRG	31
3	Anders Halland Johannessen (NOR)	Uno-X Mobility	19
4	Mattias Skjelmose (DEN)	Lidl–Trek	18
5	Florian Lipowitz (GER)	Red Bull–Bora–Hansgrohe	18
6	Ben Healy (IRL)	EF Education–EasyPost	17
7	Igor Arrieta (ESP)	UAE Team Emirates XRG	13
8	Kévin Vauquelin (FRA)	INEOS Grenadiers	11
9	Tobias Halland Johannessen (NOR)	Uno-X Mobility	10
10	Javier Romo (ESP)	Movistar Team	9

=== Young rider classification ===
Final young rider classification (1–10)
Rank	Rider	Team	Time
1	Paul Seixas (FRA)	Decathlon CMA CGM	20h 07' 35"
2	Markel Beloki (ESP)	EF Education–EasyPost	+ 18' 39"
3	Adrià Pericas (ESP)	UAE Team Emirates XRG	+ 46' 40"
4	Johannes Kulset (NOR)	Uno-X Mobility	+ 50' 47"
5	Michael Leonard (CAN)	EF Education–EasyPost	+ 54' 34"
6	Peter Øxenberg (DEN)	INEOS Grenadiers	+ 55' 16"
7	Tim Rex (BEL)	Visma–Lease a Bike	+ 1h 00' 43"
8	Andrew August (USA)	INEOS Grenadiers	+ 1h 06' 07"
9	Maxime Decomble (FRA)	Groupama–FDJ United	+ 1h 11' 56"
10	Bjoern Koerdt (GBR)	Team Picnic–PostNL	+ 1h 17' 24"

=== Team classification ===
Final team classification (1–10)
Rank	Team	Time
1	(Spain) Movistar Team	60h 49' 51"
2	(Kazakhstan) XDS Astana Team	+ 8' 21"
3	(United States) EF Education–EasyPost	+ 14' 08"
4	(United Arab Emirates) UAE Team Emirates XRG	+ 31' 41"
5	(France) Decathlon CMA CGM	+ 36' 56"
6	(Netherlands) Visma–Lease a Bike	+ 49' 13"
7	(France) Cofidis	+ 58' 03"
8	(Norway) Uno-X Mobility	+ 1h 00' 27"
9	(United Kingdom) INEOS Grenadiers	+ 1h 13' 30"
10	(Spain) Caja Rural–Seguros RGA	+ 1h 14' 15"
