= 2026 Vuelta a Andalucía =

Spanish cycling race

2026 UCI ProSeries

Race details
- Dates: 18–22 February 2026
- Stages: 5
- Distance: 803.4 km (499.2 mi)
- Winning time: 18h 47' 10"

Results
Jersey awarded to the overall winner	Winner	Iván Romeo (ESP)	(Movistar Team)
	Second	Andreas Leknessund (NOR)	(Uno-X Mobility)
	Third	Tom Pidcock (GBR)	(Pinarello–Q36.5 Pro Cycling Team)
Jersey awarded to the points classification winner	Points	Alex Aranburu (ESP)	(Cofidis)
Jersey awarded to the mountains classification winner	Mountains	Josh Burnett (NZL)	(Burgos Burpellet BH)
Jersey awarded to the youth classification winner	Youth	Jan Christen (SUI)	(UAE Team Emirates XRG)
	Team	(Spain) Movistar Team	

The 2026 Vuelta a Andalucía Ruta del Sol (English: Tour of Andalucia Route of the Sun) was a road cycling stage race that took place between 18 and 22 February 2026 in the autonomous community of Andalusia in southern Spain. The race was rated as a category 2.Pro event on the 2026 UCI ProSeries calendar, and was the 72nd edition of the Vuelta a Andalucía.

== Teams ==
Six UCI WorldTeams ten, UCI ProTeams, and one UCI Continental team made up the seventeen teams that participated in the race.

UCI WorldTeams

- Groupama–FDJ United
- Movistar Team
- Red Bull–Bora–Hansgrohe
- UAE Team Emirates XRG
- Uno-X Mobility
- Visma–Lease a Bike

UCI ProTeams

- Burgos Burpellet BH
- Caja Rural–Seguros RGA
- Cofidis
- Equipo Kern Pharma
- Euskaltel–Euskadi
- MBH Bank CSB Telecom Fort
- Modern Adventure Pro Cycling
- Pinarello–Q36.5 Pro Cycling Team
- Team Flanders–Baloise
- Team TotalEnergies

UCI Continental Teams

- Petrolike

== Route ==
Stage characteristics and winners
Stage	Date	Course	Distance	Type	Stage winner
1	18 February	Benahavís to Pizarra	150.1 km (93.3 mi)	Hilly stage	Christophe Laporte (FRA)
2	19 February	Torrox to Otura	138.6 km (86.1 mi)	Hilly stage	Iván Romeo (ESP)
3	20 February	Jaén to Lopera	180.9 km (112.4 mi)	Hilly stage	Milan Fretin (BEL)
4	21 February	Montoro to Pozoblanco	166 km (103 mi)	Hilly stage	Tom Crabbe (BEL)
5	22 February	La Roda de Andalucía to Lucena	167.8 km (104.3 mi)	Hilly stage	Tom Pidcock (GBR)
Total			803.4 km (499.2 mi)		

== Stages ==
=== Stage 1 ===
18 February 2026 – Benahavís to Pizarra, 150.1 km (93.3 mi)

Stage 1 Result
Rank	Rider	Team	Time
1	Christophe Laporte (FRA)	Visma–Lease a Bike	3h 34' 39"
2	Bastien Tronchon (FRA)	Groupama–FDJ United	+ 0"
3	Ben Oliver (NZL)	Modern Adventure Pro Cycling	+ 0"
4	Søren Wærenskjold (NOR)	Uno-X Mobility	+ 0"
5	Fred Wright (GBR)	Pinarello–Q36.5 Pro Cycling Team	+ 0"
6	Nicolò Buratti (ITA)	MBH Bank CSB Telecom Fort	+ 0"
7	Michiel Lambrecht (BEL)	Team Flanders–Baloise	+ 0"
8	Sandy Dujardin (FRA)	Team TotalEnergies	+ 0"
9	Jon Barrenetxea (ESP)	Movistar Team	+ 0"
10	José María Martín (ESP)	Equipo Kern Pharma	+ 0"

General classification after Stage 1
Rank	Rider	Team	Time
1	Christophe Laporte (FRA)	Visma–Lease a Bike	3h 34' 39"
2	Bastien Tronchon (FRA)	Groupama–FDJ United	+ 0"
3	Ben Oliver (NZL)	Modern Adventure Pro Cycling	+ 0"
4	Søren Wærenskjold (NOR)	Uno-X Mobility	+ 0"
5	Fred Wright (GBR)	Pinarello–Q36.5 Pro Cycling Team	+ 0"
6	Nicolò Buratti (ITA)	MBH Bank CSB Telecom Fort	+ 0"
7	Michiel Lambrecht (BEL)	Team Flanders–Baloise	+ 0"
8	Sandy Dujardin (FRA)	Team TotalEnergies	+ 0"
9	Jon Barrenetxea (ESP)	Movistar Team	+ 0"
10	José María Martín (ESP)	Equipo Kern Pharma	+ 0"

=== Stage 2 ===
19 February 2026 – Torrox to Otura, 138.6 km (86.1 mi)

Stage 2 Result
Rank	Rider	Team	Time
1	Iván Romeo (ESP)	Movistar Team	3h 27' 12"
2	Andreas Leknessund (NOR)	Uno-X Mobility	+ 7"
3	Alex Aranburu (ESP)	Cofidis	+ 54"
4	Jan Christen (SUI)	UAE Team Emirates XRG	+ 54"
5	Iván Cobo (ESP)	Equipo Kern Pharma	+ 54"
6	Alessandro Fancellu (ITA)	MBH Bank CSB Telecom Fort	+ 54"
7	Aleksandr Vlasov	Red Bull–Bora–Hansgrohe	+ 54"
8	Adrien Boichis (FRA)	Red Bull–Bora–Hansgrohe	+ 54"
9	Tim Wellens (BEL)	UAE Team Emirates XRG	+ 54"
10	Romain Grégoire (FRA)	Groupama–FDJ United	+ 54"

General classification after Stage 2
Rank	Rider	Team	Time
1	Iván Romeo (ESP)	Movistar Team	7h 01' 51"
2	Andreas Leknessund (NOR)	Uno-X Mobility	+ 7"
3	Fred Wright (GBR)	Pinarello–Q36.5 Pro Cycling Team	+ 54"
4	Bastien Tronchon (FRA)	Groupama–FDJ United	+ 54"
5	Alex Aranburu (ESP)	Cofidis	+ 54"
6	Christophe Laporte (FRA)	Visma–Lease a Bike	+ 54"
7	Aleksandr Vlasov	Red Bull–Bora–Hansgrohe	+ 54"
8	Alessandro Fancellu (ITA)	MBH Bank CSB Telecom Fort	+ 54"
9	Jon Barrenetxea (ESP)	Movistar Team	+ 54"
10	Adrien Boichis (FRA)	Red Bull–Bora–Hansgrohe	+ 54"

=== Stage 3 ===
20 February 2026 – Jaén to Lopera, 180.9 km (112.4 mi)

Stage 3 Result
Rank	Rider	Team	Time
1	Milan Fretin (BEL)	Cofidis	4h 11' 13"
2	Paul Penhoët (FRA)	Groupama–FDJ United	+ 0"
3	Christophe Laporte (FRA)	Visma–Lease a Bike	+ 0"
4	Sandy Dujardin (FRA)	Team TotalEnergies	+ 0"
5	Tom Crabbe (BEL)	Team Flanders–Baloise	+ 0"
6	Alex Aranburu (ESP)	Cofidis	+ 0"
7	Nicolò Buratti (ITA)	MBH Bank CSB Telecom Fort	+ 0"
8	Tom Pidcock (GBR)	Pinarello–Q36.5 Pro Cycling Team	+ 0"
9	Jon Barrenetxea (ESP)	Movistar Team	+ 0"
10	Fernando Gaviria (COL)	Caja Rural–Seguros RGA	+ 0"

General classification after Stage 3
Rank	Rider	Team	Time
1	Iván Romeo (ESP)	Movistar Team	11h 13' 04"
2	Andreas Leknessund (NOR)	Uno-X Mobility	+ 7"
3	Christophe Laporte (FRA)	Visma–Lease a Bike	+ 50"
4	Alex Aranburu (ESP)	Cofidis	+ 54"
5	Fred Wright (GBR)	Pinarello–Q36.5 Pro Cycling Team	+ 54"
6	Jon Barrenetxea (ESP)	Movistar Team	+ 54"
7	Alessandro Fancellu (ITA)	MBH Bank CSB Telecom Fort	+ 54"
8	Bastien Tronchon (FRA)	Groupama–FDJ United	+ 54"
9	Aleksandr Vlasov	Red Bull–Bora–Hansgrohe	+ 54"
10	Gotzon Martín (ESP)	Euskaltel–Euskadi	+ 54"

=== Stage 4 ===
21 February 2026 – Montoro to Pozoblanco, 166 km (103 mi)

Stage 4 Result
Rank	Rider	Team	Time
1	Tom Crabbe (BEL)	Team Flanders–Baloise	3h 50' 02"
2	Søren Wærenskjold (NOR)	Uno-X Mobility	+ 0"
3	Sandy Dujardin (FRA)	Team TotalEnergies	+ 0"
4	Alex Aranburu (ESP)	Cofidis	+ 0"
5	Christophe Laporte (FRA)	Visma–Lease a Bike	+ 0"
6	Axel Zingle (FRA)	Visma–Lease a Bike	+ 0"
7	Nicolò Buratti (ITA)	MBH Bank CSB Telecom Fort	+ 0"
8	Orluis Aular (VEN)	Movistar Team	+ 0"
9	Fred Wright (GBR)	Pinarello–Q36.5 Pro Cycling Team	+ 0"
10	Paul Penhoët (FRA)	Groupama–FDJ United	+ 0"

General classification after Stage 4
Rank	Rider	Team	Time
1	Iván Romeo (ESP)	Movistar Team	15h 03' 06"
2	Andreas Leknessund (NOR)	Uno-X Mobility	+ 7"
3	Romain Grégoire (FRA)	Groupama–FDJ United	+ 49"
4	Christophe Laporte (FRA)	Visma–Lease a Bike	+ 50"
5	Jon Barrenetxea (ESP)	Movistar Team	+ 51"
6	Tom Pidcock (GBR)	Pinarello–Q36.5 Pro Cycling Team	+ 52"
7	Johannes Kulset (NOR)	Uno-X Mobility	+ 52"
8	Torstein Træen (NOR)	Uno-X Mobility	+ 52"
9	Fred Wright (GBR)	Pinarello–Q36.5 Pro Cycling Team	+ 53"
10	Alex Aranburu (ESP)	Cofidis	+ 54"

=== Stage 5 ===
22 February 2026 – La Roda de Andalucía to Lucena, 167.8 km (104.3 mi)

Stage 5 Result
Rank	Rider	Team	Time
1	Tom Pidcock (GBR)	Pinarello–Q36.5 Pro Cycling Team	3h 43' 52"
2	Jan Christen (SUI)	UAE Team Emirates XRG	+ 10"
3	Romain Grégoire (FRA)	Groupama–FDJ United	+ 12"
4	Alex Aranburu (ESP)	Cofidis	+ 12"
5	Aleksandr Vlasov	Red Bull–Bora–Hansgrohe	+ 12"
6	Iván Romeo (ESP)	Movistar Team	+ 12"
7	Andreas Leknessund (NOR)	Uno-X Mobility	+ 12"
8	Clément Braz Afonso (FRA)	Groupama–FDJ United	+ 14"
9	Tim Wellens (BEL)	UAE Team Emirates XRG	+ 21"
10	Axel Zingle (FRA)	Visma–Lease a Bike	+ 31"

General classification after Stage <5ref name="CN-5" />
Rank	Rider	Team	Time
1	Iván Romeo (ESP)	Movistar Team	18h 47' 10"
2	Andreas Leknessund (NOR)	Uno-X Mobility	+ 7"
3	Tom Pidcock (GBR)	Pinarello–Q36.5 Pro Cycling Team	+ 27"
4	Jan Christen (SUI)	UAE Team Emirates XRG	+ 44"
5	Romain Grégoire (FRA)	Groupama–FDJ United	+ 44"
6	Alex Aranburu (ESP)	Cofidis	+ 51"
7	Aleksandr Vlasov	Red Bull–Bora–Hansgrohe	+ 54"
8	Clément Braz Afonso (FRA)	Groupama–FDJ United	+ 56"
9	Tim Wellens (BEL)	UAE Team Emirates XRG	+ 1' 03"
10	Jon Barrenetxea (ESP)	Movistar Team	+ 1' 11"

== Classification leadership table ==
Classification leadership by stage
Stage	Winner	General classification	Points classification	Mountains classification	Spanish rider classification	Andalusian rider classification	Young rider classification	Team classification
1	Christophe Laporte	Christophe Laporte	Christophe Laporte	Victor Campenaerts	Jon Barrenetxea	José María Martín	Rayan Boulahoite	Team TotalEnergies
2	Iván Romeo	Iván Romeo	Iván Romeo	Iván Romeo	Iván Romeo	José Manuel Díaz	Rayan Boulahoite	Movistar Team
3	Milan Fretin	Iván Romeo	Christophe Laporte	Josh Burnett	Iván Romeo	José Manuel Díaz	Jan Christen	Movistar Team
4	Tom Crabbe	Iván Romeo	Christophe Laporte	Josh Burnett	Iván Romeo	José Manuel Díaz	Johannes Kulset	Movistar Team
5	Tom Pidcock	Iván Romeo	Alex Aranburu	Josh Burnett	Iván Romeo	José Manuel Díaz	Jan Christen	Movistar Team
Final		Iván Romeo	Alex Aranburu	Josh Burnett	Iván Romeo	José Manuel Díaz	Jan Christen	Movistar Team

== Classification standings ==
Legend
Denotes the winner of the general classification	Denotes the winner of the young rider classification
Denotes the winner of the points classification	Denotes the winner of the Spanish rider classification
Denotes the winner of the mountains classification	Denotes the winner of the Andalusian rider classification

=== General classification ===
Final general classification (1–10)
Rank	Rider	Team	Time
1	Iván Romeo (ESP)	Movistar Team	18h 47' 10"
2	Andreas Leknessund (NOR)	Uno-X Mobility	+ 7"
3	Tom Pidcock (GBR)	Pinarello–Q36.5 Pro Cycling Team	+ 27"
4	Jan Christen (SUI)	UAE Team Emirates XRG	+ 44"
5	Romain Grégoire (FRA)	Groupama–FDJ United	+ 44"
6	Alex Aranburu (ESP)	Cofidis	+ 51"
7	Aleksandr Vlasov	Red Bull–Bora–Hansgrohe	+ 54"
8	Clément Braz Afonso (FRA)	Groupama–FDJ United	+ 56"
9	Tim Wellens (BEL)	UAE Team Emirates XRG	+ 1' 03"
10	Jon Barrenetxea (ESP)	Movistar Team	+ 1' 11"

=== Points classification ===
Final points classification (1–10)
Rank	Rider	Team	Points
1	Alex Aranburu (ESP)	Cofidis	54
2	Sandy Dujardin (FRA)	Team TotalEnergies	38
3	Tom Crabbe (BEL)	Team Flanders–Baloise	37
4	Iván Romeo (ESP)	Movistar Team	35
5	Jan Christen (SUI)	UAE Team Emirates XRG	34
6	Søren Wærenskjold (NOR)	Uno-X Mobility	34
7	Tom Pidcock (GBR)	Pinarello–Q36.5 Pro Cycling Team	33
8	Andreas Leknessund (NOR)	Uno-X Mobility	29
9	Nicolò Buratti (ITA)	MBH Bank CSB Telecom Fort	28
10	Paul Penhoët (FRA)	Groupama–FDJ United	26

=== Mountains classification ===
Final mountains classification (1–10)
Rank	Rider	Team	Points
1	Josh Burnett (NZL)	Burgos Burpellet BH	18
2	Iván Romeo (ESP)	Movistar Team	12
3	Andreas Leknessund (NOR)	Uno-X Mobility	11
4	Victor Campenaerts (BEL)	Visma–Lease a Bike	10
5	Jesús Herrada (ESP)	Burgos Burpellet BH	8
6	Tom Pidcock (GBR)	Pinarello–Q36.5 Pro Cycling Team	7
7	Geoffrey Bouchard (FRA)	Team TotalEnergies	6
8	Juan Pedro López (ESP)	Movistar Team	6
9	Aleksandr Vlasov	Red Bull–Bora–Hansgrohe	4
10	Samuel Flórez (COL)	Modern Adventure Pro Cycling	4

=== Spanish rider classification ===
Final Spanish rider classification (1–10)
Rank	Rider	Team	Time
1	Iván Romeo (ESP)	Movistar Team	18h 47' 10"
2	Alex Aranburu (ESP)	Cofidis	+ 51"
3	Jon Barrenetxea (ESP)	Movistar Team	+ 1' 11"
4	Gotzon Martín (ESP)	Euskaltel–Euskadi	+ 1' 14"
5	Jesús Herrada (ESP)	Burgos Burpellet BH	+ 1' 14"
6	Ander Okamika (ESP)	Burgos Burpellet BH	+ 1' 14"
7	José Manuel Díaz (ESP)	Burgos Burpellet BH	+ 1' 25"
8	Iván Cobo (ESP)	Equipo Kern Pharma	+ 1' 27"
9	Ion Izagirre (ESP)	Cofidis	+ 1' 27"
10	Juan Pedro López (ESP)	Movistar Team	+ 1' 27"

=== Andalusian rider classification ===
Final Andalusian rider classification (1–3)
Rank	Rider	Team	Time
1	José Manuel Díaz (ESP)	Burgos Burpellet BH	18h 48' 35"
2	Juan Pedro López (ESP)	Movistar Team	+ 2"
3	José María Martín (ESP)	Equipo Kern Pharma	+ 26' 00"

=== Young rider classification ===
Final young rider classification (1–10)
Rank	Rider	Team	Time
1	Jan Christen (SUI)	UAE Team Emirates XRG	18h 47' 54"
2	Johannes Kulset (NOR)	Uno-X Mobility	+ 28"
3	Lorenzo Nespoli (ITA)	MBH Bank CSB Telecom Fort	+ 30"
4	Rayan Boulahoite (FRA)	Team TotalEnergies	+ 42"
5	Juan Diego Quintero (COL)	Petrolike	+ 2' 50"
6	Matisse Van Kerckhove (BEL)	Visma–Lease a Bike	+ 8' 55"
7	Luke Tuckwell (AUS)	Red Bull–Bora–Hansgrohe	+ 10' 49"
8	Ibai Azanza (ESP)	Equipo Kern Pharma	+ 23' 08"
9	William Smith (GBR)	Visma–Lease a Bike	+ 26' 23"
10	Maxime Decomble (FRA)	Groupama–FDJ United	+ 29' 46"

=== Teams classification ===
Final teams classification (1–10)
Rank	Team	Time
1	(Spain) Movistar Team	56h 23' 58"
2	(Norway) Uno-X Mobility	+ 7"
3	(France) Groupama–FDJ United	+ 36"
4	(Spain) Burgos Burpellet BH	+ 1' 14"
5	(Hungary) MBH Bank CSB Telecom Fort	+ 1' 26"
6	(France) Team TotalEnergies	+ 1' 41"
7	(Germany) Red Bull–Bora–Hansgrohe	+ 2' 42"
8	(United Arab Emirates) UAE Team Emirates XRG	+ 3' 26"
9	(France) Cofidis	+ 3' 46"
10	(Switzerland) Pinarello–Q36.5 Pro Cycling Team	+ 6' 54"
