= Alex Baudin =

French cyclist (born 2001)

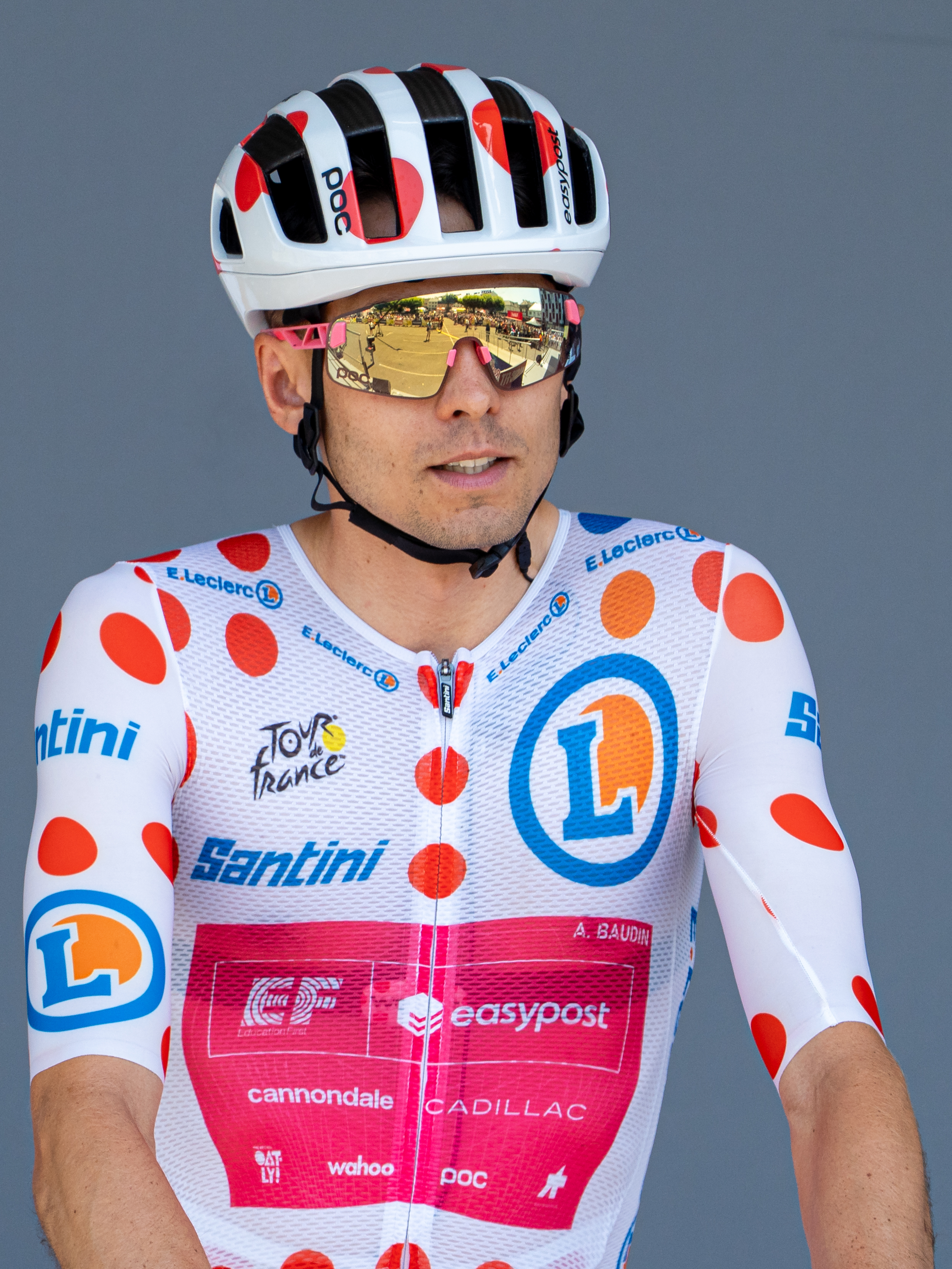
- Baudin at the 2026 Tour de France

Personal information
- Nickname: Baudinou
- Born: 25 May 2001 (age 25) Albertville, France
- Height: 1.83 m (6 ft 0 in)
- Weight: 67 kg (148 lb)

Cycling career
- Sport: Cycling
- Current team: EF Education–EasyPost
- Discipline: Road
- Role: Rider

Amateur teams
- 2019–2020: Chambéry Cyclisme Formation
- 2021: AG2R Citroën U23 Team

Professional teams
- 2022: Tudor Pro Cycling Team
- 2023–2024: AG2R Citroën Team
- 2025–: EF Education–EasyPost

Alex Camille Baudin (born 25 May 2001) is a French racing cyclist, who currently rides for UCI WorldTeam EF Education–EasyPost.

== Career ==
In 2022 during the Tour de Bretagne Baudin won stage 3 putting himself into the leaders jersey. Baudin lost the lead in the following stage after Johan Le Bon launched a long range attack winning the stage by 59 seconds and taking the lead. In the Giro della Valle d'Aosta, on stage 3, Baudin placed himself in the breakaway and managed to stay away to give himself the stage win.

Baudin rode for UCI WorldTeam AG2R Citroën Team in 2023. During the 2023 Giro d'Italia, Baudin tested positive for tramadol, leading to his 73rd overall finish being disqualified.

At the 2026 Tour Auvergne-Rhône-Alpes, Baudin won the first stage from the breakaway. He went clear from the remaining riders in the group, George Bennett and Clément Braz Afonso, on the last climb, and kept ahead of the chasers and the peloton for the last 20 kilometres. Baudin's victory meant he led the general classification, the points classification, the mountain classification, and the young rider's classification.

At the 2026 Tour de France, Baudin made it into the breakaway on stage three, and ended the day leading the mountain classification. He wore the polka dot jersey until stage five, where he ceded it to Tadej Pogačar.

Baudin signed a long-term contract with EF Education–EasyPost in 2026.

== Major results ==
2018
1st Stage 4 Tour du Pays de Vaud
5th Overall Ain Bugey Valromey Tour

1st Young rider classification
1st Stages 2 & 3

8th Overall Giro del Nordest d'Italia
2019
3rd Chrono des Nations Juniors
4th GP Général Patton
8th Overall Tour du Pays de Vaud

1st Stage 3

2021
1st Overall Tour de Côte d'Or
1st Grand Prix du Val de Villé
2022
1st Stage 3 Giro della Valle d'Aosta
2nd Overall Istrian Spring Trophy

1st Stage 2

2nd Overall Tour de Bretagne

1st Young rider classification
1st Stage 3

2024 (2 pro wins)
1st Overall Tour du Limousin

1st Young rider classification
1st Stage 2

2nd Coppa Bernocchi
2nd Grand Prix La Marseillaise
3rd Overall Tour of Guangxi
7th Overall Étoile de Bessèges
10th Overall Tour of the Basque Country
Giro d'Italia

Held after Stage 1

2025
2nd Japan Cup
9th GP Miguel Induráin
2026 (1)
1st Stage 1 Tour Auvergne-Rhône-Alpes
3rd GP Miguel Induráin
6th La Flèche Wallonne
8th Eschborn–Frankfurt
9th Overall Paris–Nice
9th Overall Tour of the Basque Country
Tour de France

Held after Stages 3–5
Combativity award Stage 3

=== Grand Tour general classification results timeline ===
Grand Tour	2023	2024
Giro d'Italia	~~73~~ (Note: Baudin result was scrubbed after testing positive for tramadol.)	21
Tour de France	—	
Vuelta a España	—	

Legend
—	Did not compete
DNF	Did not finish
