= 2026 Tour de Romandie =

2026 UCI World Tour, race 20 of 36

Race details
- Dates: 28 April – 3 May 2026
- Stages: 5 + Prologue
- Distance: 851.9 km (529.3 mi)
- Winning time: 20h 05' 42"

Results
Jersey awarded to the overall winner	Winner	Tadej Pogačar (SLO)	(UAE Team Emirates XRG)
	Second	Florian Lipowitz (GER)	(Red Bull–Bora–Hansgrohe)
	Third	Lenny Martinez (FRA)	(Team Bahrain Victorious)
Jersey awarded to the points classification winner	Points	Tadej Pogačar (SLO)	(UAE Team Emirates XRG)
Jersey awarded to the mountains classification winner	Mountains	Roland Thalmann (SUI)	(Tudor Pro Cycling Team)
Jersey awarded to the young rider classification winner	Young rider	Lenny Martinez (FRA)	(Team Bahrain Victorious)
	Team	(Germany) Red Bull–Bora–Hansgrohe	

The 2026 Tour de Romandie was a road cycling stage race that took place between 28 April and 3 May in Romandy, the French-speaking part of western Switzerland. It was the 79th edition of the Tour de Romandie and the 20th race of the 2026 UCI World Tour.

== Teams ==
Fourteen UCI WorldTeams and one UCI ProTeam participated in the race.

UCI WorldTeams

- EF Education–EasyPost
- Groupama–FDJ United
- INEOS Grenadiers
- Lidl–Trek
- Movistar Team
- NSN Cycling Team
- Red Bull–Bora–Hansgrohe
- Soudal–Quick-Step
- Team Bahrain Victorious
- Team Jayco–AlUla
- Team Picnic–PostNL
- UAE Team Emirates XRG
- Visma–Lease a Bike
- XDS Astana Team

UCI ProTeams

- Tudor Pro Cycling Team

== Pre-race favourites ==
Tadej Pogačar (UAE Team Emirates XRG) was the favourite for the race, making his debut in the race. Primary challengers included Primoz Roglič and Florian Lipowitz (Red Bull–Bora–Hansgrohe), and young talents Lenny Martinez (Team Bahrain Victorious) and Oscar Onley (INEOS Grenadiers).

== Route ==
Stage characteristics and winners
Stage	Date	Route	Distance	Type	Winner
P	28 April	Villars-sur-Glâne	3.2 km (2.0 mi)	Individual time trial	Dorian Godon (FRA)
1	29 April	Martigny to Martigny	171.2 km (106.4 mi)	Mountain stage	Tadej Pogačar (SLO)
2	30 April	Rue to Vucherens	173.1 km (107.6 mi)	Hilly stage	Tadej Pogačar (SLO)
3	1 May	Orbe to Orbe	176.6 km (109.7 mi)	Mountain stage	Dorian Godon (FRA)
4	2 May	Broc to Charmey	149.6 km (93.0 mi)	Mountain stage	Tadej Pogačar (SLO)
5	3 May	Lucens to Leysin	178.2 km (110.7 mi)	Mountain stage	Tadej Pogačar (SLO)
Total			851.9 km (529.3 mi)		

The last stage ended with a Category 1 mountain finish where the riders climbed from 381m above sea level to 1,314m on Leysin.

== Stages ==
=== Prologue ===
28 April 2026 — Villars-sur-Glâne, 3.2 kilometres (2.0 mi) (ITT)

Prologue result
Rank	Rider	Team	Time
1	Dorian Godon (FRA)	INEOS Grenadiers	3' 35"
2	Jakob Söderqvist (SWE)	Lidl–Trek	+ 6"
3	Ivo Oliveira (POR)	UAE Team Emirates XRG	+ 6"
4	Mauro Schmid (SUI)	Team Jayco–AlUla	+ 7"
5	Axel Zingle (FRA)	Visma–Lease a Bike	+ 7"
6	Tadej Pogačar (SLO)	UAE Team Emirates XRG	+ 7"
7	Albert Withen Philipsen (DEN)	Lidl–Trek	+ 7"
8	Primož Roglič (SLO)	Red Bull–Bora–Hansgrohe	+ 8"
9	Finn Fisher-Black (NZL)	Red Bull–Bora–Hansgrohe	+ 8"
10	Florian Lipowitz (GER)	Red Bull–Bora–Hansgrohe	+ 10"

General classification after prologue
Rank	Rider	Team	Time
1	Dorian Godon (FRA)	INEOS Grenadiers	3' 35"
2	Jakob Söderqvist (SWE)	Lidl–Trek	+ 6"
3	Ivo Oliveira (POR)	UAE Team Emirates XRG	+ 6"
4	Mauro Schmid (SUI)	Team Jayco–AlUla	+ 7"
5	Axel Zingle (FRA)	Visma–Lease a Bike	+ 7"
6	Tadej Pogačar (SLO)	UAE Team Emirates XRG	+ 7"
7	Albert Withen Philipsen (DEN)	Lidl–Trek	+ 7"
8	Primož Roglič (SLO)	Red Bull–Bora–Hansgrohe	+ 8"
9	Finn Fisher-Black (NZL)	Red Bull–Bora–Hansgrohe	+ 8"
10	Florian Lipowitz (GER)	Red Bull–Bora–Hansgrohe	+ 10"

=== Stage 1 ===
29 April 2026 — Martigny to Martigny, 171.2 kilometres (106.4 mi)

Stage 1 result
Rank	Rider	Team	Time
1	Tadej Pogačar (SLO)	UAE Team Emirates XRG	3h 56' 55"
2	Florian Lipowitz (GER)	Red Bull–Bora–Hansgrohe	+ 0"
3	Lenny Martinez (FRA)	Team Bahrain Victorious	+ 0"
4	Jørgen Nordhagen (NOR)	Visma–Lease a Bike	+ 0"
5	Albert Withen Philipsen (DEN)	Lidl–Trek	+ 21"
6	Sergio Higuita (COL)	XDS Astana Team	+ 21"
7	Antonio Tiberi (ITA)	Team Bahrain Victorious	+ 21"
8	Junior Lecerf (BEL)	Soudal–Quick-Step	+ 21"
9	Luke Plapp (AUS)	Team Jayco–AlUla	+ 21"
10	Jefferson Alveiro Cepeda (ECU)	Movistar Team	+ 21"

General classification after stage 1
Rank	Rider	Team	Time
1	Tadej Pogačar (SLO)	UAE Team Emirates XRG	4h 00' 27"
2	Florian Lipowitz (GER)	Red Bull–Bora–Hansgrohe	+ 7"
3	Lenny Martinez (FRA)	Team Bahrain Victorious	+ 16"
4	Jørgen Nordhagen (NOR)	Visma–Lease a Bike	+ 23"
5	Albert Withen Philipsen (DEN)	Lidl–Trek	+ 31"
6	Primož Roglič (SLO)	Red Bull–Bora–Hansgrohe	+ 32"
7	Antonio Tiberi (ITA)	Team Bahrain Victorious	+ 41"
8	Carlos Rodríguez (ESP)	INEOS Grenadiers	+ 41"
9	Luke Plapp (AUS)	Team Jayco–AlUla	+ 41"
10	Luke Tuckwell (AUS)	Red Bull–Bora–Hansgrohe	+ 42"

=== Stage 2 ===
30 April 2026 — Rue to Vucherens, 173.1 kilometres (107.6 mi)

Stage 2 result
Rank	Rider	Team	Time
1	Tadej Pogačar (SLO)	UAE Team Emirates XRG	4h 08' 11"
2	Dorian Godon (FRA)	INEOS Grenadiers	+ 0"
3	Finn Fisher-Black (NZL)	Red Bull–Bora–Hansgrohe	+ 0"
4	Clément Champoussin (FRA)	XDS Astana Team	+ 0"
5	Valentin Paret-Peintre (FRA)	Soudal–Quick-Step	+ 0"
6	Albert Withen Philipsen (DEN)	Lidl–Trek	+ 0"
7	Davide Toneatti (ITA)	XDS Astana Team	+ 0"
8	Yannis Voisard (SUI)	Tudor Pro Cycling Team	+ 0"
9	Georg Steinhauser (GER)	EF Education–EasyPost	+ 0"
10	Nairo Quintana (COL)	Movistar Team	+ 0"

General classification after stage 2
Rank	Rider	Team	Time
1	Tadej Pogačar (SLO)	UAE Team Emirates XRG	8h 08' 28"
2	Florian Lipowitz (GER)	Red Bull–Bora–Hansgrohe	+ 17"
3	Lenny Martinez (FRA)	Team Bahrain Victorious	+ 26"
4	Jørgen Nordhagen (NOR)	Visma–Lease a Bike	+ 33"
5	Albert Withen Philipsen (DEN)	Lidl–Trek	+ 41"
6	Antonio Tiberi (ITA)	Team Bahrain Victorious	+ 51"
7	Carlos Rodríguez (ESP)	INEOS Grenadiers	+ 51"
8	Luke Plapp (AUS)	Team Jayco–AlUla	+ 51"
9	Luke Tuckwell (AUS)	Red Bull–Bora–Hansgrohe	+ 52"
10	Jefferson Alveiro Cepeda (ECU)	Movistar Team	+ 52"

=== Stage 3 ===
1 May 2026 — Orbe to Orbe, 176.6 kilometres (109.7 mi)

Stage 3 result
Rank	Rider	Team	Time
1	Dorian Godon (FRA)	INEOS Grenadiers	3h 58' 18"
2	Finn Fisher-Black (NZL)	Red Bull–Bora–Hansgrohe	+ 0"
3	Valentin Paret-Peintre (FRA)	Soudal–Quick-Step	+ 0"
4	Tadej Pogačar (SLO)	UAE Team Emirates XRG	+ 0"
5	Sergio Higuita (COL)	XDS Astana Team	+ 0"
6	Albert Withen Philipsen (DEN)	Lidl–Trek	+ 0"
7	Junior Lecerf (BEL)	Soudal–Quick-Step	+ 0"
8	Clément Champoussin (FRA)	XDS Astana Team	+ 0"
9	Clément Berthet (FRA)	Groupama–FDJ United	+ 0"
10	Luke Plapp (AUS)	Team Jayco–AlUla	+ 0"

General classification after stage 3
Rank	Rider	Team	Time
1	Tadej Pogačar (SLO)	UAE Team Emirates XRG	12h 06' 46"
2	Florian Lipowitz (GER)	Red Bull–Bora–Hansgrohe	+ 17"
3	Lenny Martinez (FRA)	Team Bahrain Victorious	+ 26"
4	Jørgen Nordhagen (NOR)	Visma–Lease a Bike	+ 33"
5	Albert Withen Philipsen (DEN)	Lidl–Trek	+ 41"
6	Carlos Rodríguez (ESP)	INEOS Grenadiers	+ 51"
7	Luke Plapp (AUS)	Team Jayco–AlUla	+ 51"
8	Luke Tuckwell (AUS)	Red Bull–Bora–Hansgrohe	+ 52"
9	Jefferson Alveiro Cepeda (ECU)	Movistar Team	+ 52"
10	Clément Berthet (FRA)	Groupama–FDJ United	+ 57"

=== Stage 4 ===
2 May 2026 — Broc to Charmey, 149.6 kilometres (93.0 mi)

Stage 4 result
Rank	Rider	Team	Time
1	Tadej Pogačar (SLO)	UAE Team Emirates XRG	3h 40' 24"
2	Florian Lipowitz (GER)	Red Bull–Bora–Hansgrohe	+ 14"
3	Pablo Castrillo (ESP)	Movistar Team	+ 1' 42"
4	Lorenzo Fortunato (ITA)	XDS Astana Team	+ 1' 42"
5	Sergio Higuita (COL)	XDS Astana Team	+ 1' 47"
6	Yannis Voisard (SUI)	Tudor Pro Cycling Team	+ 1' 47"
7	Luke Tuckwell (AUS)	Red Bull–Bora–Hansgrohe	+ 1' 47"
8	Junior Lecerf (BEL)	Soudal–Quick-Step	+ 1' 47"
9	Jefferson Alveiro Cepeda (ECU)	Movistar Team	+ 1' 47"
10	Jefferson Alexander Cepeda (ECU)	EF Education–EasyPost	+ 1' 47"

General classification after stage 4
Rank	Rider	Team	Time
1	Tadej Pogačar (SLO)	UAE Team Emirates XRG	15h 47' 00"
2	Florian Lipowitz (GER)	Red Bull–Bora–Hansgrohe	+ 35"
3	Lenny Martinez (FRA)	Team Bahrain Victorious	+ 2' 23"
4	Jørgen Nordhagen (NOR)	Visma–Lease a Bike	+ 2' 30"
5	Luke Plapp (AUS)	Team Jayco–AlUla	+ 2' 48"
6	Luke Tuckwell (AUS)	Red Bull–Bora–Hansgrohe	+ 2' 49"
7	Jefferson Alveiro Cepeda (ECU)	Movistar Team	+ 2' 49"
8	Junior Lecerf (BEL)	Soudal–Quick-Step	+ 2' 54"
9	Albert Withen Philipsen (DEN)	Lidl–Trek	+ 2' 56"
10	Lorenzo Fortunato (ITA)	XDS Astana Team	+ 3' 03"

=== Stage 5 ===
3 May 2026 — Lucens to Leysin, 178.2 km (110.7 mi)

Stage 5 result
Rank	Rider	Team	Time
1	Tadej Pogačar (SLO)	UAE Team Emirates XRG	4h 18' 52"
2	Florian Lipowitz (GER)	Red Bull–Bora–Hansgrohe	+ 3"
3	Primož Roglič (SLO)	Red Bull–Bora–Hansgrohe	+ 7"
4	Lorenzo Fortunato (ITA)	XDS Astana Team	+ 11"
5	Jørgen Nordhagen (NOR)	Visma–Lease a Bike	+ 11"
6	Lenny Martinez (FRA)	Team Bahrain Victorious	+ 11"
7	Albert Philipsen (DEN)	Lidl–Trek	+ 14"
8	Yannis Voisard (SUI)	Tudor Pro Cycling Team	+ 17"
9	Luke Tuckwell (AUS)	Red Bull–Bora–Hansgrohe	+ 17"
10	Luke Plapp (AUS)	Team Jayco–AlUla	+ 17"

General classification after stage 5
Rank	Rider	Team	Time
1	Tadej Pogačar (SLO)	UAE Team Emirates XRG	20h 05' 42"
2	Florian Lipowitz (GER)	Red Bull–Bora–Hansgrohe	+ 42"
3	Lenny Martinez (FRA)	Team Bahrain Victorious	+ 2' 44"
4	Jørgen Nordhagen (NOR)	Visma–Lease a Bike	+ 2' 51"
5	Luke Plapp (AUS)	Team Jayco–AlUla	+ 3' 15"
6	Luke Tuckwell (AUS)	Red Bull–Bora–Hansgrohe	+ 3' 16"
7	Jefferson Alveiro Cepeda (ECU)	Movistar Team	+ 3' 18"
8	Albert Withen Philipsen (DEN)	Lidl–Trek	+ 3' 20"
9	Lorenzo Fortunato (ITA)	XDS Astana Team	+ 3' 24"
10	Junior Lecerf (BEL)	Soudal–Quick-Step	+ 3' 32"

== Classification leadership table ==
Classification leadership by stage
Stage	Winner	General classification	Points classification	Mountains classification	Young rider classification	Team classification
P	Dorian Godon	Dorian Godon	Dorian Godon	Dorian Godon	Jakob Söderqvist	UAE Team Emirates XRG
1	Tadej Pogačar	Tadej Pogačar	Tadej Pogačar	Lenny Martinez	Lenny Martinez	Red Bull–Bora–Hansgrohe
2	Tadej Pogačar	Tadej Pogačar	Tadej Pogačar	Roland Thalmann	Lenny Martinez	Red Bull–Bora–Hansgrohe
3	Dorian Godon	Tadej Pogačar	Tadej Pogačar	Roland Thalmann	Lenny Martinez	Red Bull–Bora–Hansgrohe
4	Tadej Pogačar	Tadej Pogačar	Tadej Pogačar	Roland Thalmann	Lenny Martinez	Red Bull–Bora–Hansgrohe
5	Tadej Pogačar	Tadej Pogačar	Tadej Pogačar	Roland Thalmann	Lenny Martinez	Red Bull–Bora–Hansgrohe
Final		Tadej Pogačar	Tadej Pogačar	Roland Thalmann	Lenny Martinez	Red Bull–Bora–Hansgrohe

== Classification standings ==
Legend
Denotes the winner of the general classification	Denotes the winner of the mountains classification
Denotes the winner of the points classification	Denotes the winner of the young rider classification

=== General classification ===
Final general classification (1–10)
Rank	Rider	Team	Time
1	Tadej Pogačar (SLO)	UAE Team Emirates XRG	20h 05' 42"
2	Florian Lipowitz (GER)	Red Bull–Bora–Hansgrohe	+ 42"
3	Lenny Martinez (FRA)	Team Bahrain Victorious	+ 2' 44"
4	Jørgen Nordhagen (NOR)	Visma–Lease a Bike	+ 2' 51"
5	Luke Plapp (AUS)	Team Jayco–AlUla	+ 3' 15"
6	Luke Tuckwell (AUS)	Red Bull–Bora–Hansgrohe	+ 3' 16"
7	Jefferson Alveiro Cepeda (ECU)	Movistar Team	+ 3' 18"
8	Albert Withen Philipsen (DEN)	Lidl–Trek	+ 3' 20"
9	Lorenzo Fortunato (ITA)	XDS Astana Team	+ 3' 24"
10	Junior Lecerf (BEL)	Soudal–Quick-Step	+ 3' 32"

=== Points classification ===
Final points classification (1–10)
Rank	Rider	Team	Points
1	Tadej Pogačar (SLO)	UAE Team Emirates XRG	203
2	Dorian Godon (FRA)	INEOS Grenadiers	110
3	Florian Lipowitz (GER)	Red Bull–Bora–Hansgrohe	87
4	Albert Withen Philipsen (DEN)	Lidl–Trek	70
5	Finn Fisher-Black (NZL)	Red Bull–Bora–Hansgrohe	69
6	Lenny Martinez (FRA)	Team Bahrain Victorious	58
7	Valentin Paret-Peintre (FRA)	Soudal–Quick-Step	55
8	Sergio Higuita (COL)	XDS Astana Team	53
9	Jakob Söderqvist (SWE)	Lidl–Trek	50
10	Primož Roglič (SLO)	Red Bull–Bora–Hansgrohe	49

=== Mountains classification ===
Final mountains classification (1–10)
Rank	Rider	Team	Points
1	Roland Thalmann (SWI)	Tudor Pro Cycling Team	51
2	Tadej Pogačar (SLO)	UAE Team Emirates XRG	43
3	Florian Lipowitz (GER)	Red Bull–Bora–Hansgrohe	26
4	Lenny Martinez (FRA)	Team Bahrain Victorious	21
5	Louis Vervaeke (BEL)	Soudal–Quick-Step	21
6	Jørgen Nordhagen (NOR)	Visma–Lease a Bike	16
7	Georg Steinhauser (GER)	EF Education–EasyPost	12
8	Damiano Caruso (ITA)	Team Bahrain Victorious	10
9	Jan Tratnik (SLO)	Red Bull–Bora–Hansgrohe	10
10	Valentin Paret-Peintre (FRA)	Soudal–Quick-Step	10

=== Young rider classification ===
Final young rider classification (1–10)
Rank	Rider	Team	Time
1	Lenny Martinez (FRA)	Team Bahrain Victorious	20h 08' 26"
2	Jørgen Nordhagen (NOR)	Visma–Lease a Bike	+ 7"
3	Luke Tuckwell (AUS)	Red Bull–Bora–Hansgrohe	+ 32"
4	Albert Withen Philipsen (DEN)	Lidl–Trek	+ 36"
5	Junior Lecerf (BEL)	Soudal–Quick-Step	+ 48"
6	Michael Leonard (CAN)	EF Education–EasyPost	+ 5' 03"
7	Andrew August (USA)	INEOS Grenadiers	+ 10' 27"
8	Tijmen Graat (NED)	Visma–Lease a Bike	+ 17' 26"
9	Robbe Dhondt (BEL)	Team Picnic–PostNL	+ 20' 55"
10	Maxime Decomble (FRA)	Groupama–FDJ United	+ 25' 27"

=== Team classification ===
Final team classification (1–10)
Rank	Team	Time
1	(Germany) Red Bull–Bora–Hansgrohe	60h 24' 21"
2	(Kazakhstan) XDS Astana Team	+ 5' 38"
3	(Spain) Movistar Team	+ 11' 06"
4	(United States) EF Education–EasyPost	+ 13' 54"
5	(Netherlands) Visma–Lease a Bike	+ 20' 40"
6	(United Kingdom) INEOS Grenadiers	+ 22' 05"
7	(United Arab Emirates) UAE Team Emirates XRG	+ 23' 46"
8	Team Bahrain Victorious	+ 26' 41"
9	(Belgium) Soudal–Quick-Step	+ 29' 28"
10	(France) Groupama–FDJ United	+ 34' 27"
