= Jørgen Nordhagen =

Norwegian cyclist (born 2005)

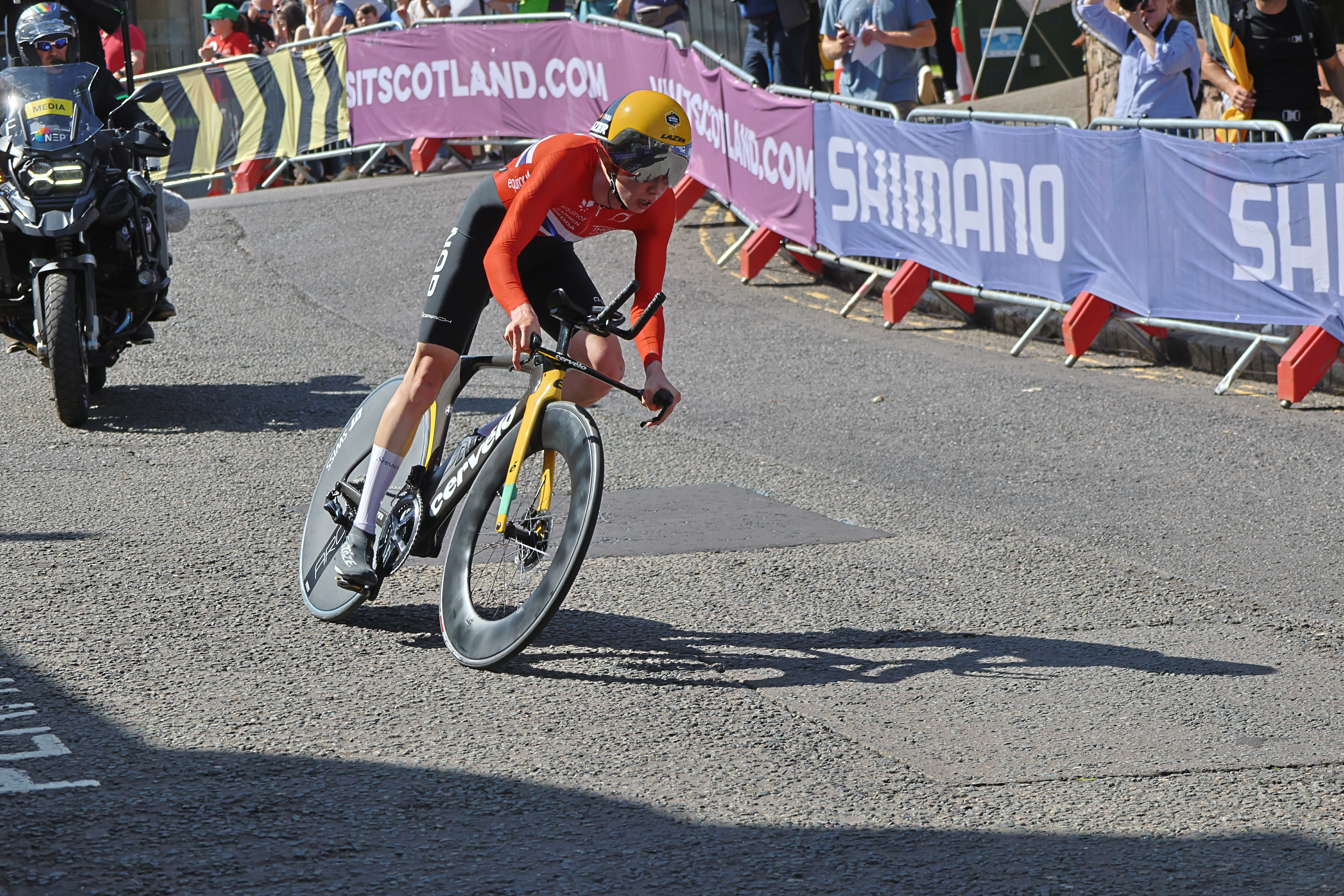
- Nordhagen in 2023

Personal information
- Born: 10 January 2005 (age 21) Tranby, Norway
- Height: 1.77 m (5 ft 10 in)
- Weight: 59 kg (130 lb)

Cycling career
- Sport: Cycling
- Current team: Visma–Lease a Bike
- Discipline: Road
- Role: Rider

Amateur teams
- 2021: Asker Cykleklubb
- 2022–2023: Lillehammer Cykleklubb

Professional teams
- 2024: Visma–Lease a Bike Development
- 2025–: Visma–Lease a Bike
Medal record
Representing Norway
Men's road bicycle racing
European Championships
Silver medal – second place	2022 Anadia	Junior road race
Silver medal – second place	2023 Drenthe	Junior time trial
Men's cross-country skiing
Junior World Championships
Gold medal – first place	2024 Planica	20 km mass start freestyle

Jørgen Nordhagen (born 10 January 2005) is a Norwegian professional racing cyclist, who rides for UCI WorldTeam Visma–Lease a Bike. He also competed in cross-country skiing, having won the mass start freestyle race at the 2024 Nordic Junior World Ski Championships. He announced he would retire from the sport after the 2023–24 season to focus fully on cycling.

At the 2026 UAE Tour he finished eighth overall. At the 2026 Volta a Catalunya he rode in support of Visma team leader Jonas Vingegaard. He finished fourth in the 2026 Tour de Romandie.

== Major results ==
2022
1st Time trial, National Junior Road Championships
UEC European Junior Championships

2nd Road race
10th Time trial

2nd Overall Grand Prix Rüebliland

1st Young rider classification
1st Stage 3

3rd Overall Saarland Trofeo

1st Young rider classification

3rd Overall Course de la Paix Juniors

1st Young rider classification

5th Overall Ain Bugey Valromey Tour
9th Time trial, UCI World Junior Road Championships
9th Overall Trophée Centre Morbihan
2023
National Junior Road Championships

1st Time trial
5th Road race

1st Overall Course de la Paix Juniors

1st Stages 1 & 2a (ITT)

1st Overall Eroica Juniores

1st Stage 2

1st Stage 3b (ITT) Saarland Trofeo
2nd Time trial, UEC European Junior Championships
2nd Overall Tour te Fjells

1st Stage 1 (ITT)

3rd Overall Côte d'Or Classic Juniors
UCI World Junior Road Championships

4th Time trial
6th Road race

4th Overall Giro della Lunigiana
7th Coppa Andrea Meneghelli
8th Overall Tour de Himmelfart

1st Stages 2 & 4

2024
1st Overall Giro della Regione Friuli Venezia Giulia

1st Points classification
1st Mountains classification
1st Young rider classification
1st Stage 3

1st Gran Premio Sportivi di Poggiana
1st Coppa Città di San Daniele
3rd Overall Tour Alsace

1st Stage 3

3rd Liège–Bastogne–Liège Espoirs
7th Overall Deutschland Tour

1st Mountains classification

9th G.P. Palio del Recioto
2025
3rd Overall Tour de l'Avenir
4th Overall Giro Next Gen

1st Stage 8

5th Overall Tour of Guangxi

1st Young rider classification

5th Time trial, National Road Championships
10th Tour du Jura
2026
1st Stage 3 (TTT) Tour Auvergne-Rhône-Alpes
2nd Overall O Gran Camiño

1st Young rider classification

4th Overall Tour de Romandie
8th Overall UAE Tour
