= Jon Barrenetxea =

Spanish cyclist (born 2000)

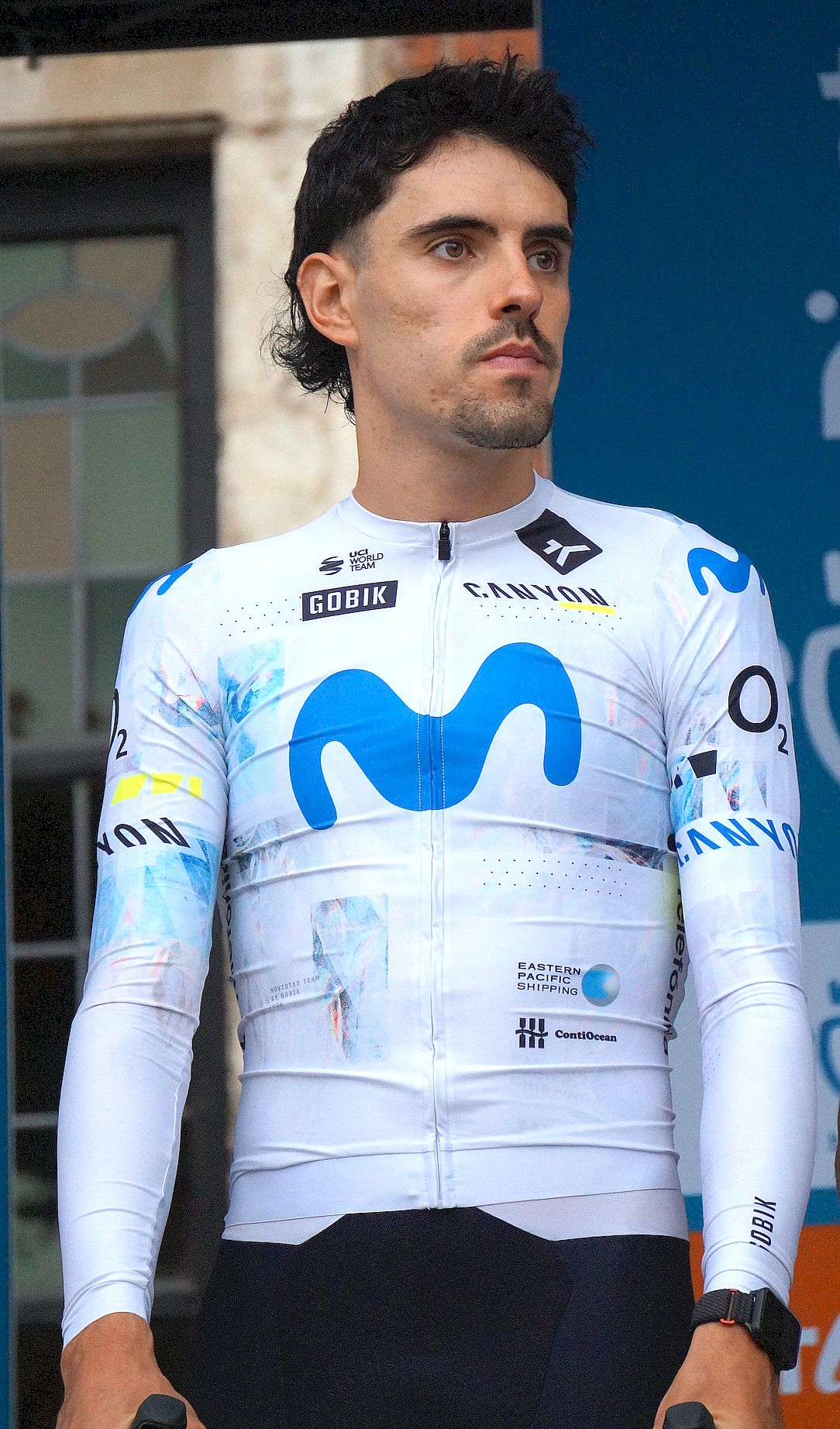
- Barrenetxea in 2026

Personal information
- Full name: Jon Barrenetxea Golzarri
- Born: 20 April 2000 (age 26) Gamiz-Fika, Spain
- Height: 1.88 m (6 ft 2 in)
- Weight: 74 kg (163 lb)

Cycling career
- Sport: Cycling
- Current team: Movistar Team
- Discipline: Road
- Role: Rider
- Rider type: All-rounder, puncheur

Amateur teams
- 2018: Gastronomía Baska–Avia–Liftra
- 2019–2020: Baqué–Ideus–BH

Professional teams
- 2021–2023: Caja Rural–Seguros RGA
- 2024–: Movistar Team

Jon Barrenetxea (born 20 April 2000) is a Spanish cyclist, who currently rides for UCI WorldTeam Movistar Team.

== Major results ==
2018
National Junior Road Championships

1st Road race
4th Time trial

2022
1st Mountains classification Vuelta a Andalucía
1st Young rider classification International Tour of Hellas
2023
1st Mountains classification, Tour of the Basque Country
3rd Boucles de l'Aulne
6th Classica da Arrabida
9th Overall Volta ao Alentejo
Combativity award Stage 9 Vuelta a España
2024 (1 pro win)
1st Circuito de Getxo
2025 (1)
1st Stage 5 Vuelta a Andalucía
3rd Eschborn–Frankfurt
4th Trofeo Serra Tramuntana
6th Trofeo Calvià
7th Circuito de Getxo
2026 (2)
1st Tour du Finistère
1st Boucles de l'Aulne
10th Overall Vuelta a Andalucía
10th Classique Dunkerque

=== Grand Tour general classification results timeline ===
Grand Tour	2023
Giro d'Italia	—
Tour de France	—
Vuelta a España	74

Legend
—	Did not compete
DNF	Did not finish
