= La Bridoire =

- Commune
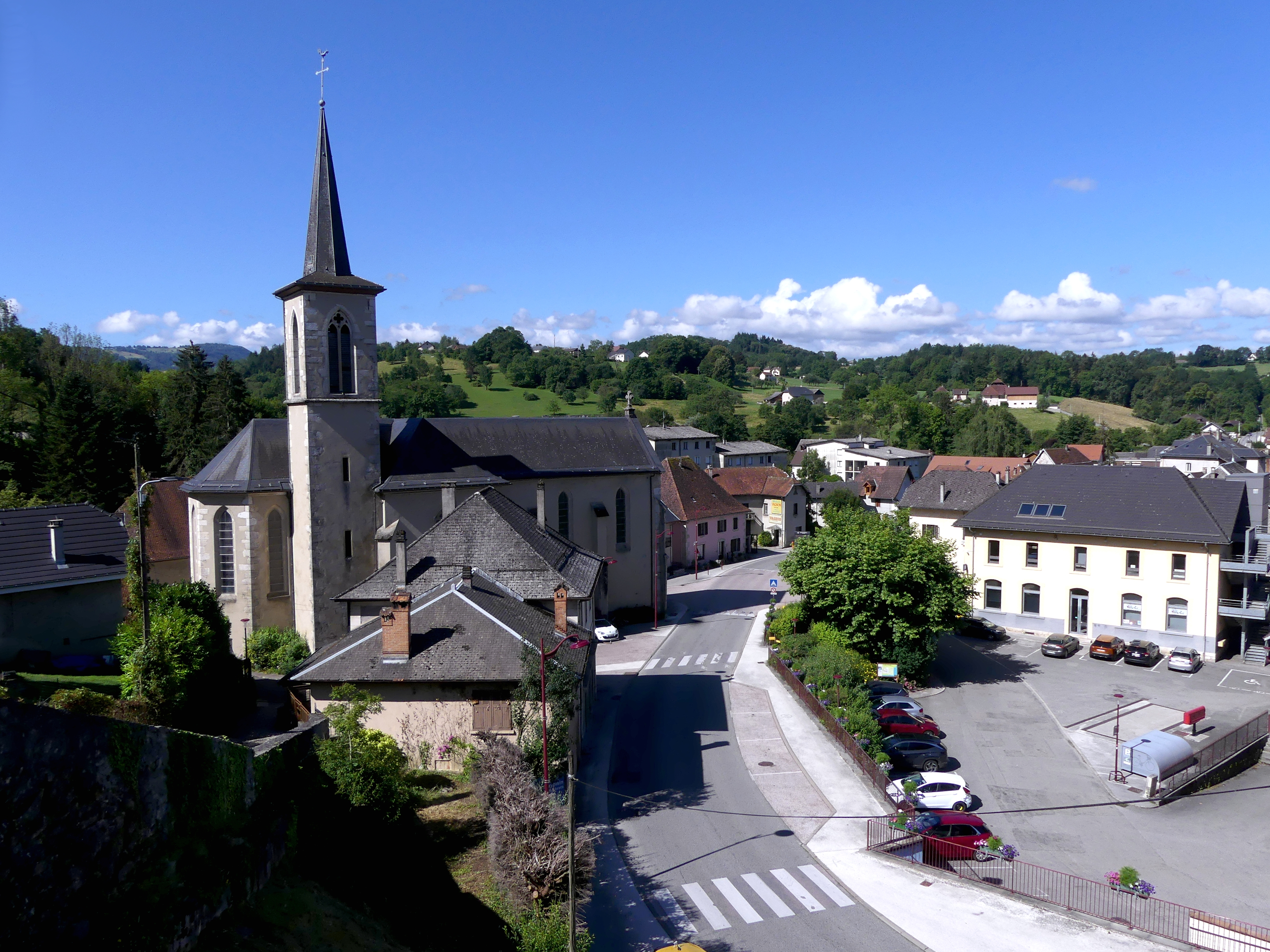
- A general view of La Bridoire

- Coat of arms
- Location of La Bridoire
- Location within France Location within Auvergne-Rhône-Alpes
- Coordinates: 45°31′37″N 5°44′36″E
- Country: France
- Region: Auvergne-Rhône-Alpes
- Department: Savoie
- Arrondissement: Chambéry
- Canton: Le Pont-de-Beauvoisin
- Intercommunality: Val Guiers

Government
  - Mayor (2020–2026): Yves Berthier
- Area^{1}: 6.18 km^{2} (2.39 sq mi)
- Highest elevation: 527 m (1,729 ft)
- Lowest elevation: 250 m (820 ft)
- Population (2023): 1,202
  - Density: 194/km^{2} (504/sq mi)
- Time zone: UTC+01:00 (CET)
  - Summer (DST): UTC+02:00 (CEST)
- INSEE/Postal code: 73058 /73520
- ^{1} French Land Register data, which excludes lakes, ponds, glaciers > 1 km^{2} (0.386 sq mi or 247 acres) and river estuaries.

La Bridoire (French pronunciation: [la bʁidwaʁ]; Arpitan: La Barduire) is a commune in the Savoie department in the Auvergne-Rhône-Alpes region in south-eastern France.

== Geography ==
=== Climate ===
According to a 2010 study by the French National Centre for Scientific Research, the commune is situated in a "mountain margins climate". In 2020, Météo-France published its own typology of French climates in which it categorized the commune's climate as a mountain climate or mountain margins climate within the Northern Alps climate region.

From 1971 to 2000, the average annual temperature was 10.9 °C (51.6 °F), with an annual range of 19.2 °C (66.6 °F). The average annual rainfall was 1,263 millimetres (49.7 in), with 9.9 days of rainfall in January and 7.8 days of rainfall in July.

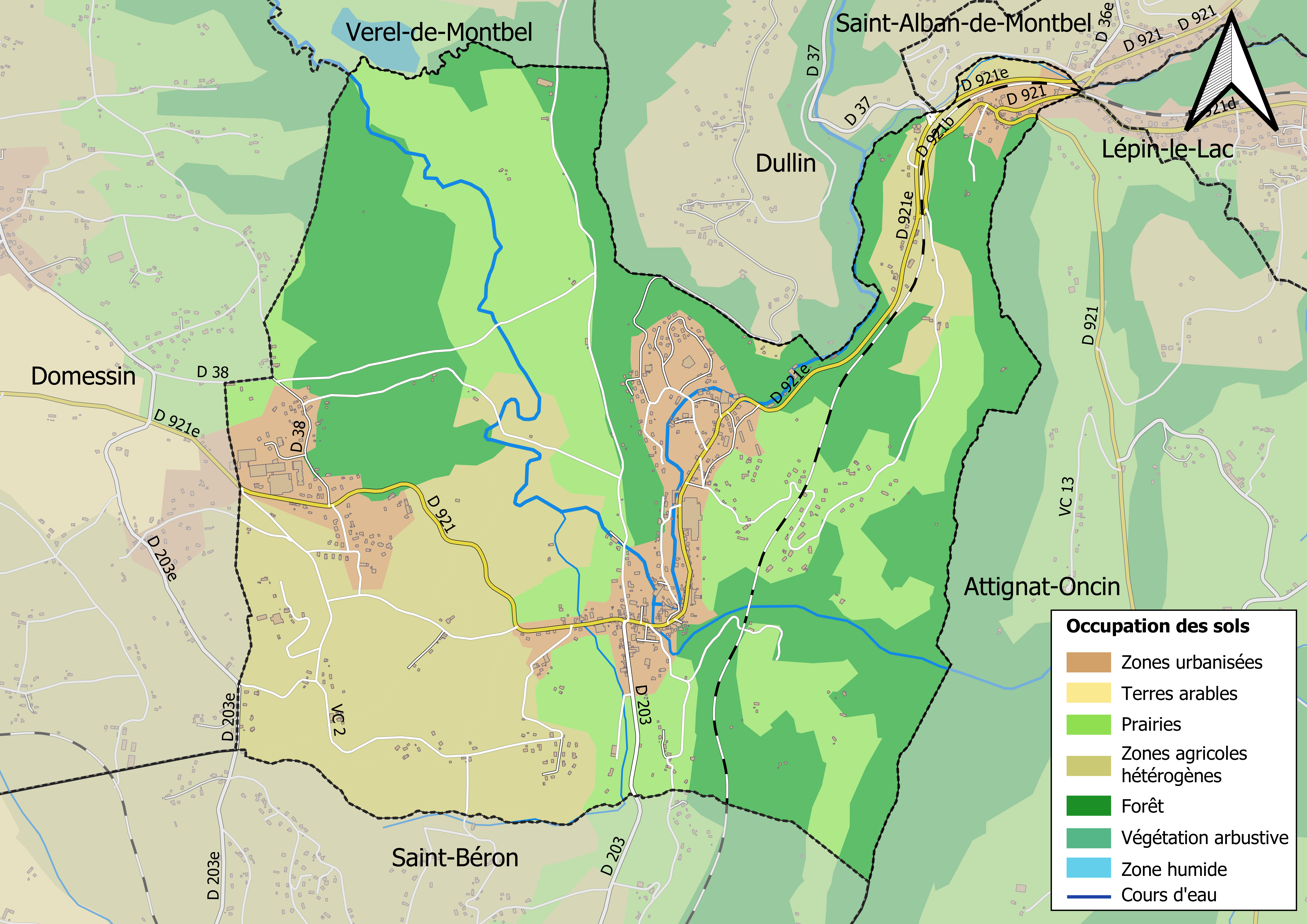
Map of the commune's infrastructure and land use in 2018

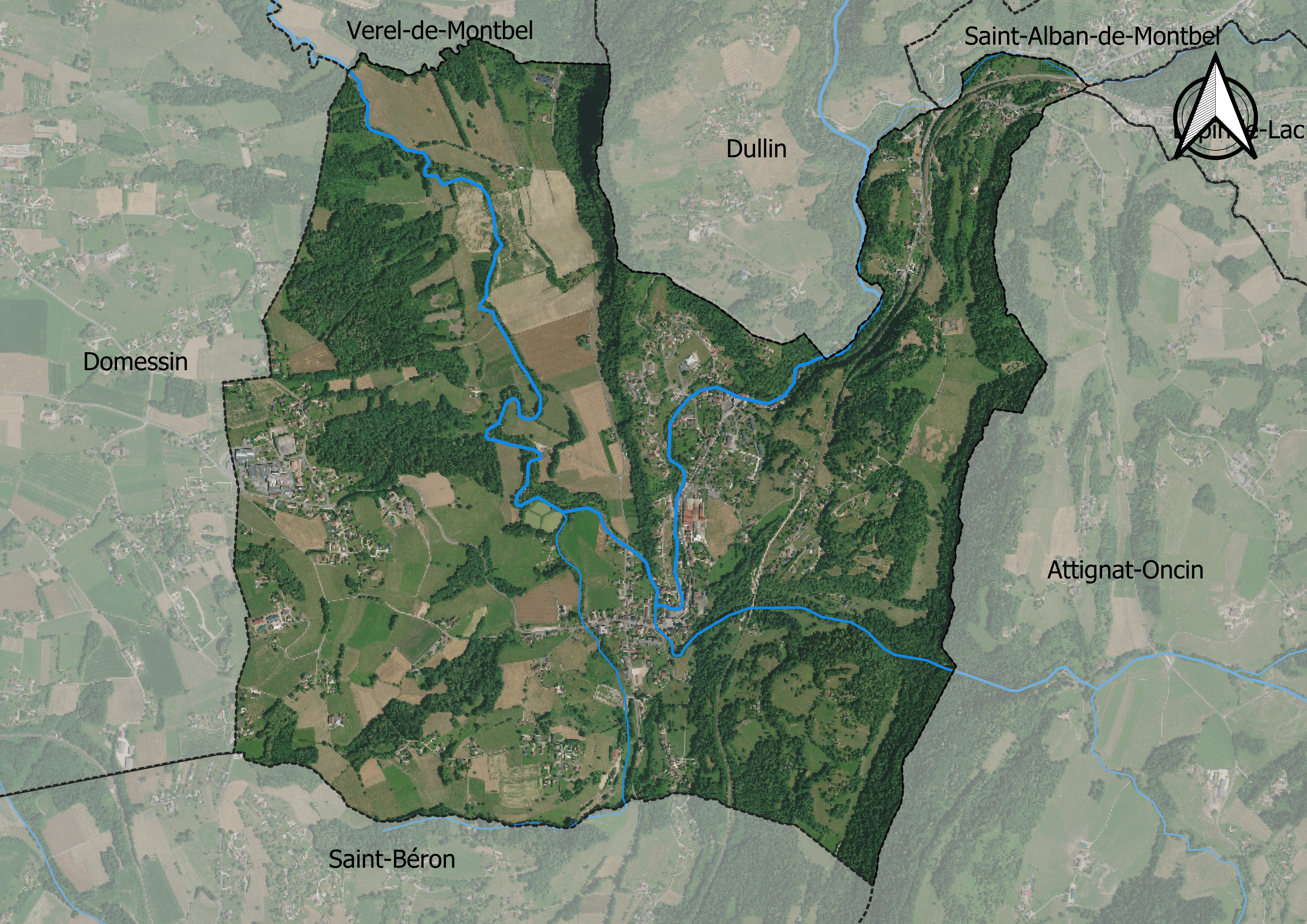
Satellite image of the commune

== See also ==
- Communes of the Savoie department
