= Luke Tuckwell =

Australian cyclist

Personal information
- Born: 21 June 2004 (age 22) Orange, New South Wales, Australia
- Height: 1.82 m (6 ft 0 in)
- Weight: 66 kg (146 lb)

Cycling career
- Sport: Cycling
- Current team: Red Bull–Bora–Hansgrohe
- Discipline: Road
- Role: Rider
- Rider type: Climber

Amateur team
- 2022: InForm TMX MAKE

Professional teams
- 2023: Trinity Racing (stagiaire)
- 2024: Trinity Racing
- 2025: Red Bull–Bora–Hansgrohe Rookies
- 2026–: Red Bull–Bora–Hansgrohe

Luke Tuckwell (born 21 June 2004) is an Australian cyclist, who currently rides for UCI WorldTeam Red Bull–Bora–Hansgrohe.

== Major results ==
2024
1st Overall Rás Mumhan

1st Points classification
1st Young rider classification

5th Flèche Ardennaise
6th Overall Ronde de l'Isard
10th Overall Giro Next Gen
2025
2nd Overall Giro Next Gen
8th Liège–Bastogne–Liège Espoirs
10th Overall Tour de l'Avenir
2026
2nd Overall Tour Auvergne-Rhône-Alpes
6th Overall Tour de Romandie
