= Léo Bisiaux =

French cyclist (born 2005)

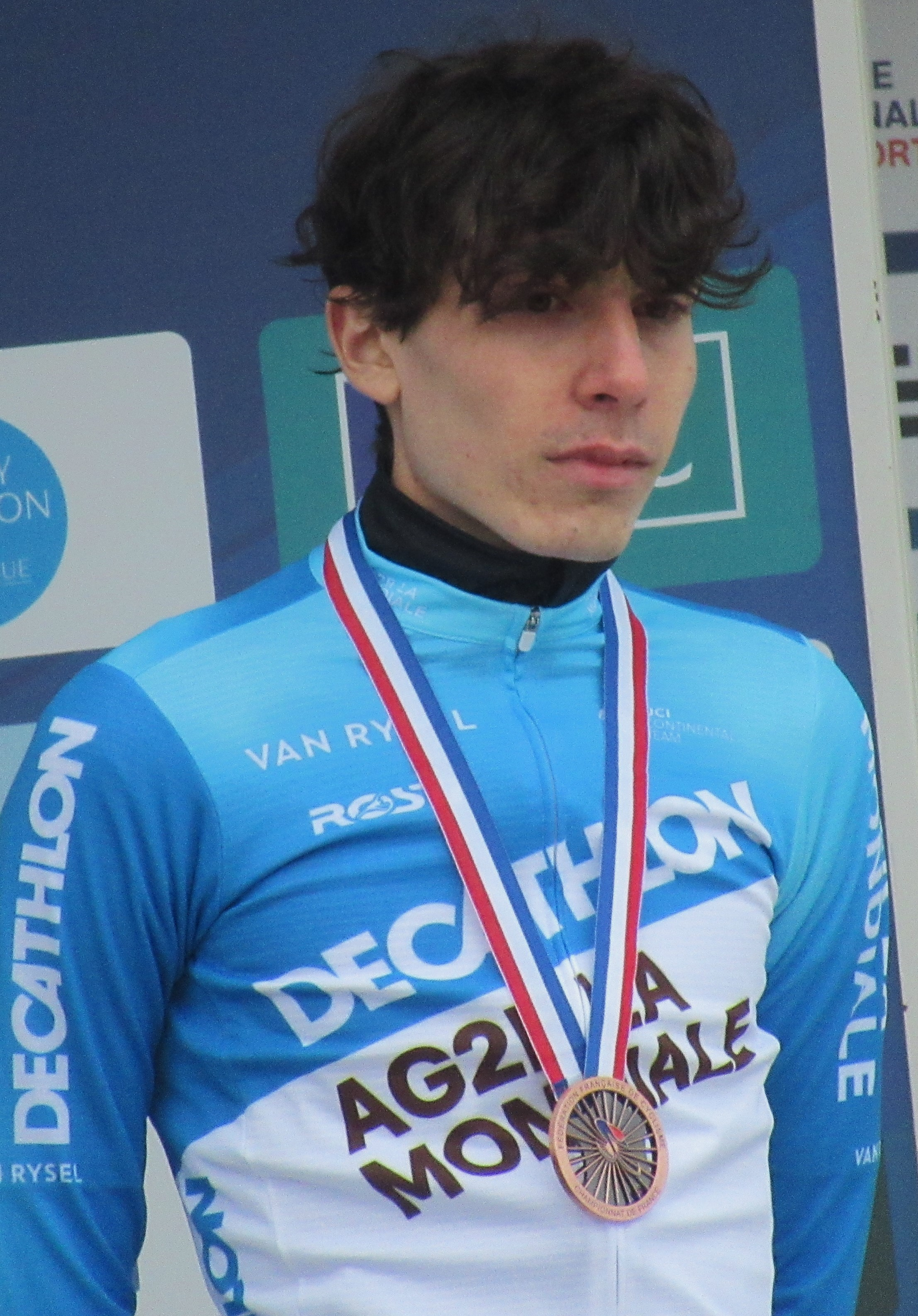
- Bisiaux in 2024

Personal information
- Born: 14 February 2005 (age 21) Fontainebleau, France
- Height: 1.78 m (5 ft 10 in)
- Weight: 52 kg (115 lb)

Cycling career
- Sport: Cycling
- Current team: Decathlon CMA CGM Team
- Disciplines: Road; Cyclo-cross
- Role: Rider

Amateur team
- 2022–2023: AG2R Citroën U19 Team

Professional teams
- 2024: Decathlon–AG2R La Mondiale Development Team
- 2025–: Decathlon–AG2R La Mondiale
Medal record
Representing France
Men's road bicycle racing
European Championships
Bronze medal – third place	2022 Anadia	Junior road race
Bronze medal – third place	2023 Drenthe	Junior team relay
Men's cyclo-cross
World Championships
Gold medal – first place	2023 Hoogerheide	Junior race
European Championships
Gold medal – first place	2022 Namur	Junior race

Léo Bisiaux (born 14 February 2005) is a French road cyclist, who rides for UCI WorldTeam Decathlon CMA CGM Team. In February 2023, he won the UCI Junior Cyclo-cross World Championships.

== Major results ==
=== Cyclo-cross ===
2021–2022
2nd National Junior Championships
2022–2023
1st UCI World Junior Championships
1st UEC European Junior Championships
1st National Junior Championships
UCI Junior World Cup

1st Tábor
1st Zonhoven
2nd Maasmechelen

Junior Coupe de France

1st Camors I
1st Camors II
1st Troyes I
1st Troyes II

Junior Swiss Cup

1st Mettmenstetten

1st Junior Illnau
1st Junior Lützelbach
1st Junior Brumath
2nd Junior Orée-d'Anjou
2023–2024
Under-23 Coupe de France

1st Albi II
1st Flamanville II
3rd Flamanville I
3rd Albi I
3rd Quelneuc II

UCI Under-23 World Cup

3rd Namur
5th Benidorm

3rd National Under-23 Championships
4th UCI World Under-23 Championships
2024–2025
1st National Under-23 Championships
UCI Under-23 World Cup

4th Hulst
5th Dublin

=== Road ===
2022
2nd La Classique des Alpes Juniors
3rd Road race, UEC European Junior Championships
3rd Gran Premio Eccellenze Valli del Soligo
4th Overall Tour du Valromey
2023
1st Overall Grand Prix Rüebliland

1st Mountains classification
1st Stage 4

1st Overall Driedaagse van Axel

1st Stage 4

1st Overall Giro della Lunigiana
3rd Team relay, UEC European Junior Championships
3rd Time trial, National Junior Championships
6th Overall Keizer der Juniores
7th Overall Eroica Juniores
2024
3rd Overall Grand Prix Jeseníky
4th Overall Tour de l'Avenir
6th Overall Giro Next Gen
2025 (1 pro win)
3rd Overall Vuelta a Burgos

1st Stage 3

5th Paris–Camembert
2026
2nd Tour du Jura
3rd Classic Grand Besançon Doubs
5th Road race, National Championships
7th Overall Vuelta a Burgos

1st Young rider classification

9th Road race, UEC European Championships
10th Clásica de San Sebastián

==== Grand Tour general classification results timeline ====
Grand Tour	2025
Giro d'Italia	—
Tour de France	—
Vuelta a España	52
