= Ramses Debruyne =

Belgian cyclist

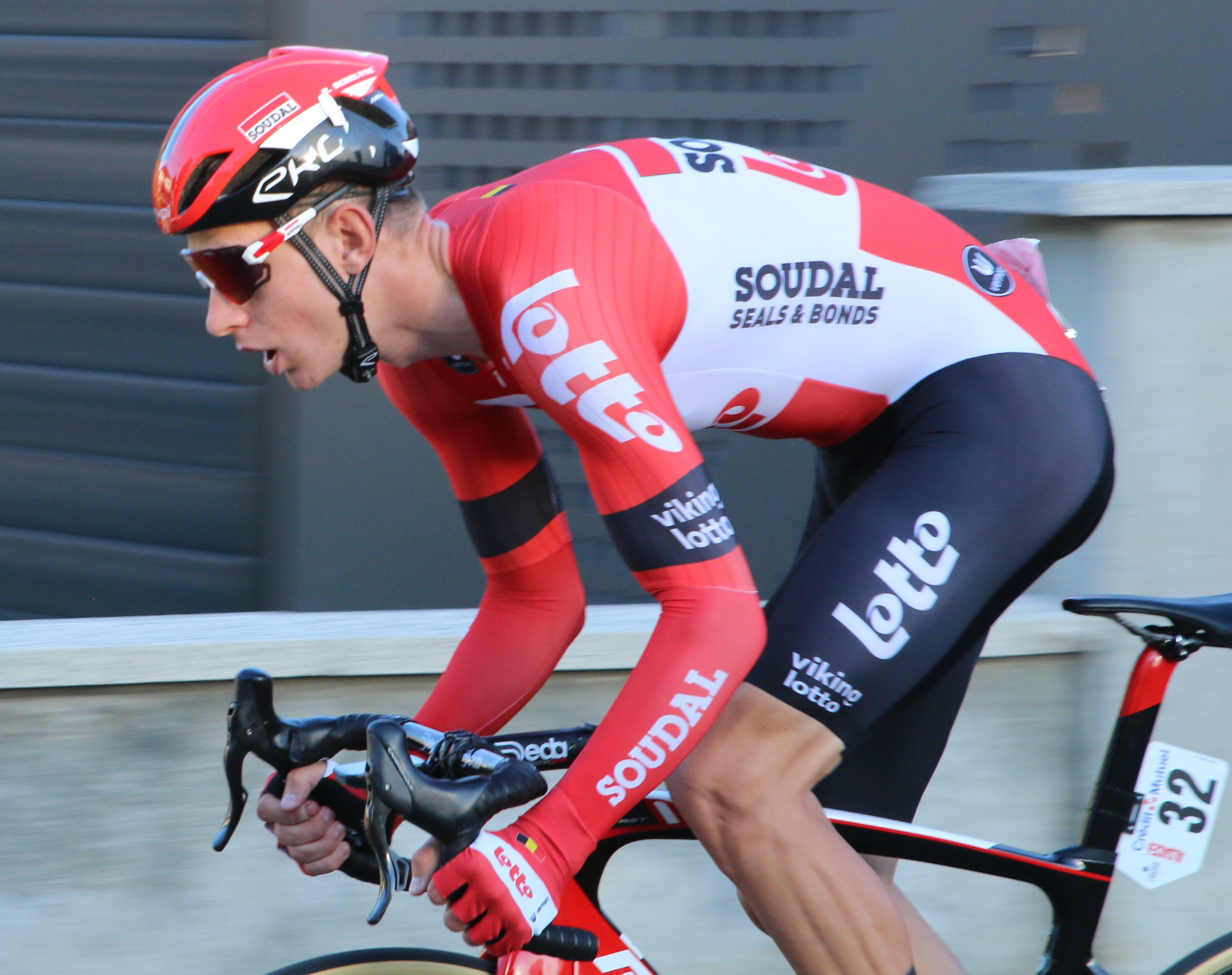
- Debruyne in 2022

Personal information
- Born: 31 August 2002 (age 24) Rollegem, Belgium
- Height: 1.79 m (5 ft 10 in)
- Weight: 66 kg (146 lb)

Cycling career
- Sport: Cycling
- Current team: Alpecin–Premier Tech
- Discipline: Road
- Role: Rider

Amateur teams
- 2018–2020: Acrog–Pauwels-Sauzen–Balen BC
- 2021–2022: Lotto–Soudal U23

Professional teams
- 2023: Lotto–Dstny Development Team
- 2024: Alpecin–Deceuninck Development Team
- 2025–: Alpecin–Deceuninck

Ramses Debruyne (born 31 August 2002) is a Belgian cyclist, who currently rides for UCI WorldTeam Alpecin–Premier Tech.

== Major results ==
2019
2nd Overall Aubel–Thimister–Stavelot
3rd Time trial, National Junior Road Championships
5th Ronde van Vlaanderen Juniores
6th Guido Reybrouck Classic
9th Overall Course de la Paix Juniors
2020
2nd Road race, National Junior Road Championships
3rd Ster Van Zuid Limburg
2022
1st Stage 1 (TTT) Tour Alsace
2nd Coppa Zappi
4th Trofeo Città di Meldola
5th Paris–Tours Espoirs
6th Strade Bianche di Romagna
8th Grand Prix de la ville de Pérenchies
2023
1st Grand Prix Albert Fauville
3rd La Get Up Cup
3rd Piccolo Giro di Lombardia
4th Liège–Bastogne–Liège U23
2024
2nd Youngster Coast Challenge
2025
10th Veneto Classic
2026
6th Road race, UEC European Road Championships
