= Clément Braz Afonso =

French cyclist

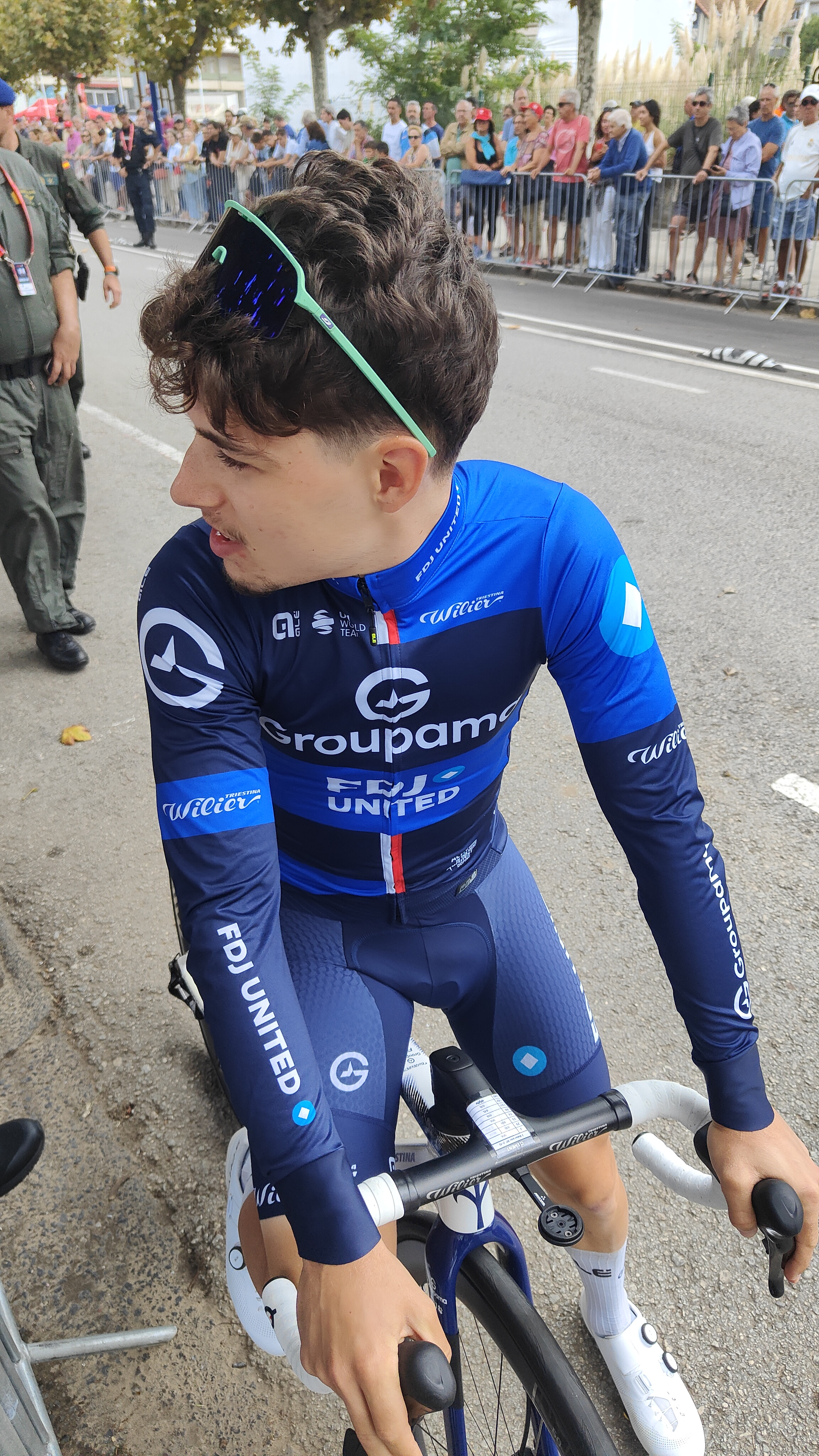
- Braz Afonso at 2025 Vuelta a España

Personal information
- Born: 8 November 1999 (age 26) Brive-la-Gaillarde, France
- Height: 1.63 m (5 ft 4 in)
- Weight: 50 kg (110 lb)

Cycling career
- Sport: Cycling
- Current team: Groupama–FDJ United
- Discipline: Road
- Role: Rider
- Rider type: Climber, puncheur

Amateur teams
- 2018: UC Aube
- 2019: Team Macadam's Cowboys
- 2020–2021: CC Étupes
- 2022–2023: Philippe Wagner Cycling

Professional teams
- 2024: CIC U Nantes Atlantique
- 2025–: Groupama–FDJ

Clément Braz Afonso (born 8 November 1999) is a French cyclist, who currently rides for UCI WorldTeam Groupama–FDJ United.

== Major results ==
2019
9th Overall Tour de la Mirabelle
2021
3rd Overall Tour de la Guadeloupe

1st Young rider classification
1st Stage 8 (ITT)

7th Overall Ronde de l'Isard
7th Overall Tour Alsace
2023
2nd Overall Tour de la Mirabelle

1st Mountains classification

2nd Overall Tour de Moselle
2nd Paris–Troyes
3rd Overall Tour de la Manche

1st Stage 1

2024
2nd Grand Prix de Plouay
8th Tour du Doubs
9th Overall Tour Alsace
9th Route Adélie
2025
4th Tour du Doubs
2026
1st Mountains classification, Tour Auvergne-Rhône-Alpes
7th Classic Grand Besançon Doubs
7th Tour du Jura
8th Overall Vuelta a Andalucía
9th Overall Tour of Guangxi

=== Grand Tour general classification results timeline ===
Grand Tour	2025
Giro d'Italia	—
Tour de France	—
Vuelta a España	35

Legend
—	Did not compete
DNF	Did not finish
