= 2025 Liège–Bastogne–Liège =

Cycling race

2025 UCI World Tour, race 19 of 36

Race details
- Dates: 27 April 2025
- Stages: 1
- Distance: 252 km (157 mi)
- Winning time: 6h 00' 09"

Results
	Winner	Tadej Pogačar (SLO)	(UAE Team Emirates XRG)
	Second	Giulio Ciccone (ITA)	(Lidl–Trek)
	Third	Ben Healy (IRL)	(EF Education–EasyPost)

The 2025 Liège–Bastogne–Liège was a Belgian road cycling one-day race that took place on 27 April. It was the 111th edition of Liège–Bastogne–Liège and the 19th event of the 2025 UCI World Tour. It was the finale of the Ardennes classics, following the Amstel Gold Race and La Flèche Wallonne. The route was 252 kilometres (157 mi) long, slightly shorter than previous editions, and featured eleven classified climbs, starting and ending in Liège.

The race was won by defending champion Tadej Pogačar (UAE Team Emirates XRG) after a solo attack, winning by over a minute ahead of Giulio Ciccone (Lidl–Trek) and Ben Healy (EF Education–EasyPost). Pogačar became the first rider to finish on the podium in six successive monuments.

== Pre-race favorites ==
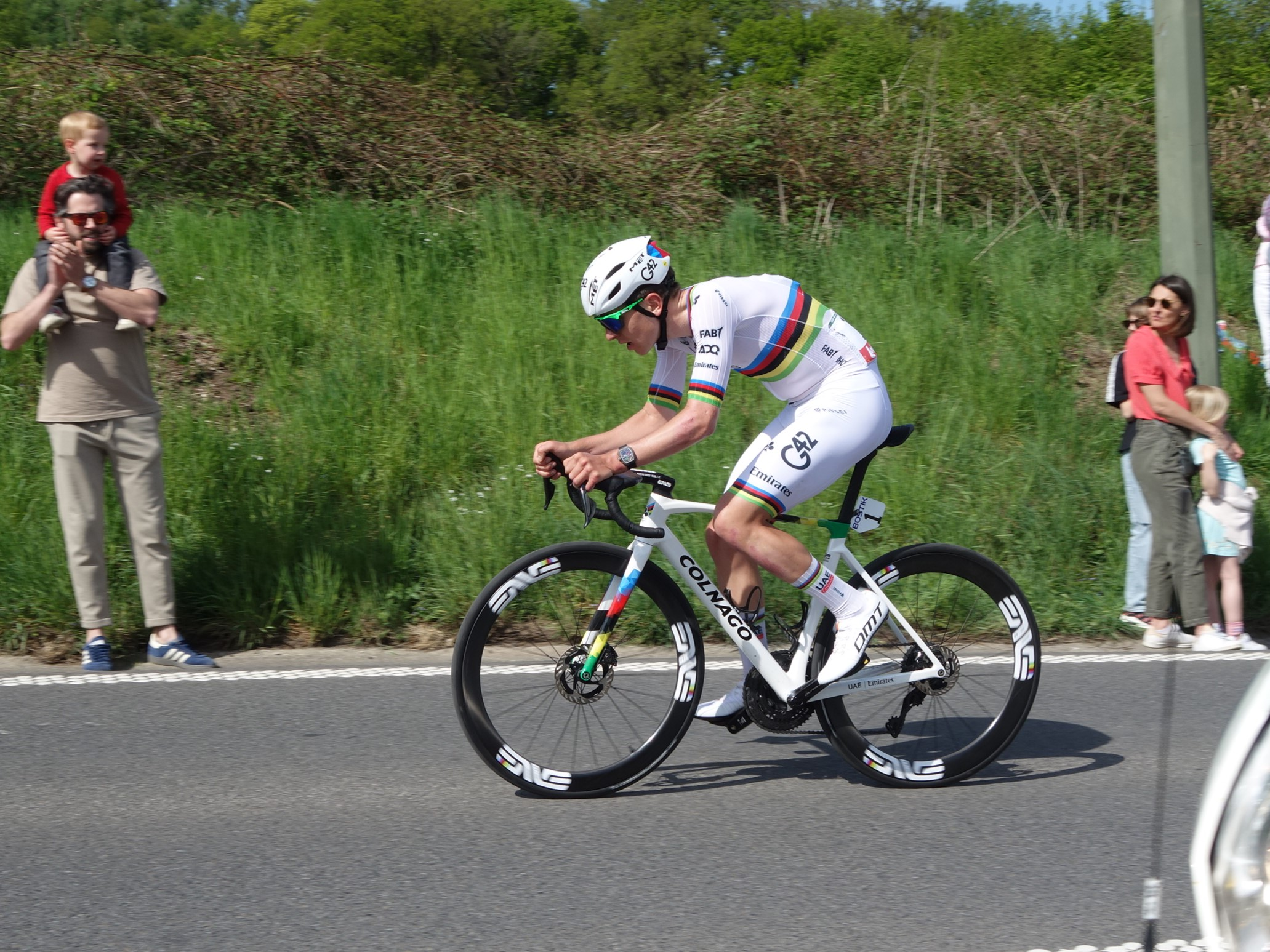
Pogačar solo at the Côte des Forges.

Defending champion Tadej Pogačar was widely considered by analysts to be the top favorite, having won the race twice before in 2021 and 2024, and coming into the race showing strong form by winning the Tour of Flanders and La Flèche Wallonne. Remco Evenepoel, also a two-time champion, was another top contender, alongside Mattias Skjelmose, who out-sprinted Pogačar and Evenepoel a week earlier to win the Amstel Gold Race. Other riders mentioned in pre-race analysis included Tom Pidcock, Kevin Vauquelin, Ben Healy, Lennert Van Eetvelt, Santiago Buitrago, and Romain Bardet.

== Teams ==
25 teams took part in the race, including all eighteen UCI WorldTeams and seven UCI ProTeams. The Uno-X Mobility team wore retro 7-Eleven jerseys for the race, a callback to the 7-Eleven sponsored-team that raced in the 1980s. The jerseys, worn only for this single race, were intended to celebrate the 40th anniversary of the former team's debut at the race, and highlight sponsor Reitan's relationship with 7-Eleven in Scandinavia.

UCI WorldTeams

- Alpecin–Deceuninck
- Arkéa–B&B Hotels
- Cofidis
- Decathlon–AG2R La Mondiale
- EF Education–EasyPost
- Groupama–FDJ
- INEOS Grenadiers
- Intermarché–Wanty
- Lidl–Trek
- Movistar Team
- Red Bull–Bora–Hansgrohe
- Soudal–Quick-Step
- Team Bahrain Victorious
- Team Jayco–AlUla
- Team Picnic–PostNL
- UAE Team Emirates XRG
- Visma–Lease a Bike
- XDS Astana Team

UCI ProTeams

- Israel–Premier Tech
- Lotto
- Q36.5 Pro Cycling Team
- Team TotalEnergies
- Tudor Pro Cycling Team
- Uno-X Mobility
- Wagner Bazin WB

== Result ==
Result
Rank	Rider	Team	Time
1	Tadej Pogačar (SLO)	UAE Team Emirates XRG	6h 00' 09"
2	Giulio Ciccone (ITA)	Lidl–Trek	+ 1' 03"
3	Ben Healy (IRL)	EF Education–EasyPost	+ 1' 03"
4	Simone Velasco (ITA)	XDS Astana Team	+ 1' 10"
5	Thibau Nys (BEL)	Lidl–Trek	+ 1' 10"
6	Andrea Bagioli (ITA)	Lidl–Trek	+ 1' 10"
7	Daniel Martínez (COL)	Red Bull–Bora–Hansgrohe	+ 1' 10"
8	Axel Laurance (FRA)	INEOS Grenadiers	+ 1' 10"
9	Tom Pidcock (GBR)	Q36.5 Pro Cycling Team	+ 1' 10"
10	Neilson Powless (USA)	EF Education–EasyPost	+ 1' 10"
