= 2023 Liège–Bastogne–Liège =

Cycling race

2023 UCI World Tour, race 19 of 35

Race details
- Dates: 23 April 2023
- Stages: 1
- Distance: 258.1 km (160.4 mi)
- Winning time: 6h 15' 49"

Results
	Winner	Remco Evenepoel (BEL)	(Soudal–Quick-Step)
	Second	Tom Pidcock (GBR)	(INEOS Grenadiers)
	Third	Santiago Buitrago (COL)	(Team Bahrain Victorious)

The 2023 Liège–Bastogne–Liège was a Belgian road cycling one-day race that took place on 23 April 2023. It was the 109th edition of Liège–Bastogne–Liège and the 19th event of the 2023 UCI World Tour. It was won by Remco Evenepoel of Soudal Quick-Step for the second year in succession, after a solo attack in the last 40 kilometres.

== Teams ==
Twenty-five teams participated in the race, including all eighteen UCI WorldTeams and seven UCI ProTeams.

UCI WorldTeams

- AG2R Citroën Team
- Alpecin–Deceuninck
- Arkéa–Samsic
- Astana Qazaqstan Team
- Bora–Hansgrohe
- Cofidis
- EF Education–EasyPost
- Groupama–FDJ
- INEOS Grenadiers
- Intermarché–Circus–Wanty
- Movistar Team
- Soudal–Quick-Step
- Team Bahrain Victorious
- Team DSM
- Team Jayco–AlUla
- Team Jumbo–Visma
- Trek–Segafredo
- UAE Team Emirates

UCI ProTeams

- Bingoal WB
- Equipo Kern Pharma
- Israel–Premier Tech
- Lotto–Dstny
- Team Flanders–Baloise
- Team TotalEnergies
- Uno-X Pro Cycling Team

== Summary ==
The highly anticipated duel between the World champion, Remco Evenepoel of Belgium and Slovenia's Tadej Pogačar, winner of the Amstel Gold and La Fleche, failed to materialise after Pogačar suffered a serious crash early in the race, a broken wrist forcing his abandonment. Pogačar had surgery later that day on the fracture.

In Pogačar's absence, Evenepoel immediately became the overwhelming favourite with young Briton and 2023 Strade Bianche winner Tom Pidcock and on-form Irish rider Ben Healy his most likely rivals.

On Côte de La Redoute, Evenepoel attacked in the saddle, moving away from the peloton and only Pidcock was able to follow him. A few kilometres later, Evenepoel pushed on the accelerator again and left Pidcock trailing, soloing 30 kilometres to retain the title. Pidcock refueled, readjusted and linked up with Healy and Santiago Buitrago, holding off the rest of the peloton for the remainder of the race, Pidcock and Buitrago holding off Healy to complete the podium.

== Result ==
Result
Rank	Rider	Team	Time
1	Remco Evenepoel (BEL)	Soudal–Quick-Step	6h 15' 49"
2	Tom Pidcock (GBR)	INEOS Grenadiers	+ 1' 06"
3	Santiago Buitrago (COL)	Team Bahrain Victorious	+ 1' 06"
4	Ben Healy (IRL)	EF Education–EasyPost	+ 1' 08"
5	Valentin Madouas (FRA)	Groupama–FDJ	+ 1' 24"
6	Guillaume Martin (FRA)	Cofidis	+ 1' 25"
7	Tiesj Benoot (BEL)	Team Jumbo–Visma	+ 1' 37"
8	Patrick Konrad (AUT)	Bora–Hansgrohe	+ 1' 48"
9	Mattias Skjelmose (DEN)	Trek–Segafredo	+ 1' 48"
10	Marc Hirschi (SUI)	UAE Team Emirates	+ 1' 48"
