= Ben Healy (cyclist) =

Irish cyclist (born 2000)

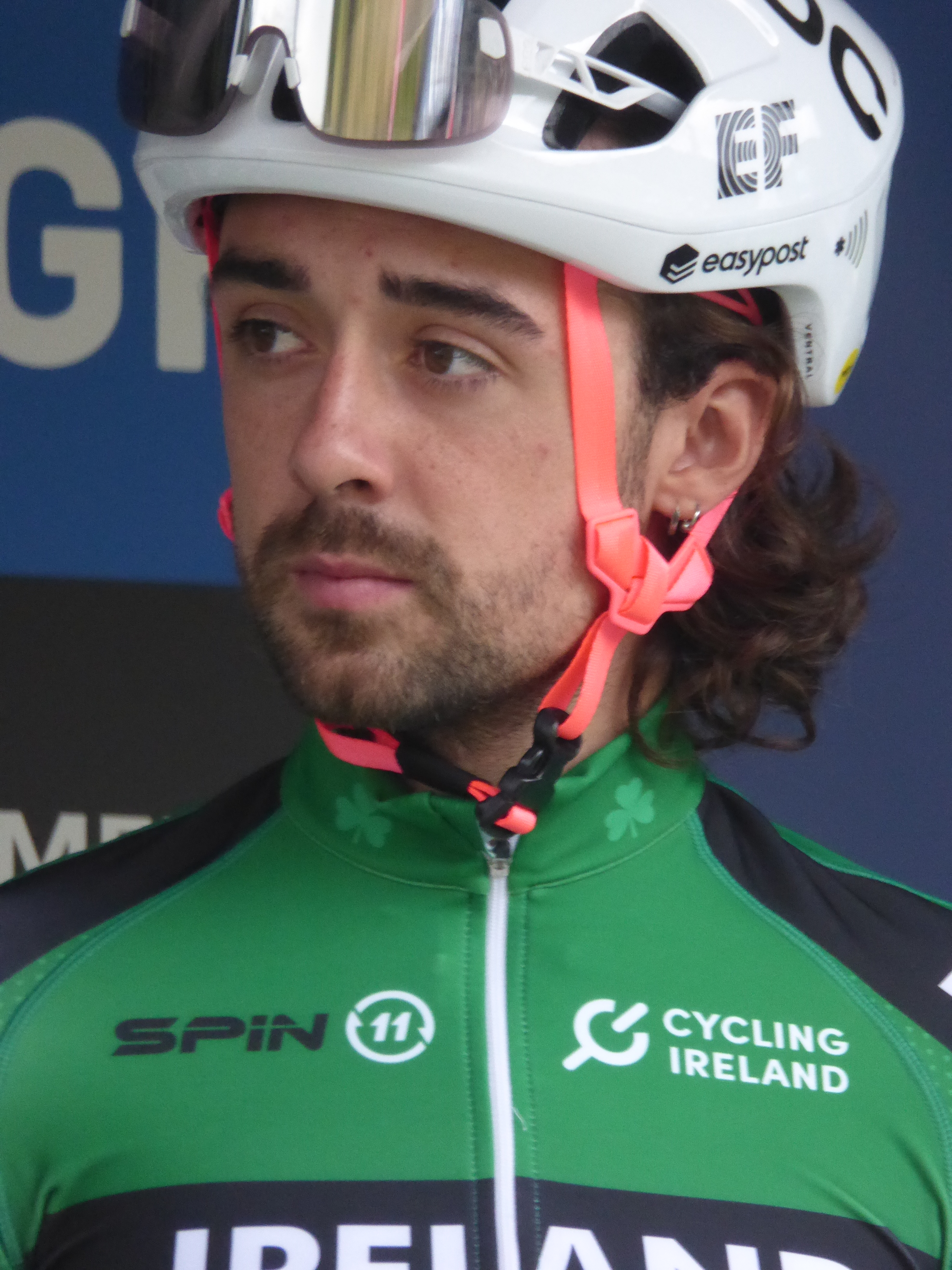
- Healy at the 2023 UCI Road World Championships – Men's road race

Personal information
- Born: 11 September 2000 (age 26) Wordsley, England
- Height: 1.75 m (5 ft 9 in)
- Weight: 65 kg (143 lb)

Cycling career
- Sport: Cycling
- Current team: EF Education–EasyPost
- Discipline: Road
- Role: Rider
- Rider type: Puncheur; Breakaway specialist; Rouleur

Amateur teams
- 2017–2018: Zappi Racing
- 2020: Trinity Racing

Professional teams
- 2019: Team Wiggins Le Col
- 2021: Trinity Racing
- 2022–: EF Education–EasyPost

Major wins
- Grand Tours Tour de France 1 individual stage (2025) Combativity award (2025) Giro d'Italia 1 individual stage (2023) One-day races and Classics National Road Race Championships (2020, 2023) National Time Trial Championships (2022) GP Industria & Artigianato (2023)
Medal record
Representing Ireland
Men's road bicycle racing
World Championships
Bronze medal – third place	2025 Kigali	Road race

Benjamin Maxton Healy (born 11 September 2000) is an Irish professional cyclist, who currently rides for UCI WorldTeam EF Education–EasyPost. He has won stages at the 2023 Giro d'Italia and the 2025 Tour de France, and achieved a podium finish at Liege-Bastogne-Liege. In July 2025, he became the first Irish rider since Stephen Roche to wear the yellow jersey at the Tour de France.

== Early life ==
Healy was born and raised in Wordsley, Dudley, West Midlands, in England's Black Country. Although English by birth he has Irish heritage through his paternal grandparents and as a teenager for the purposes of competitive cycling he pledged his allegiance to Ireland. His dad, Bryan, is the youngest of three siblings and the only one to be born in England after his Cork- and Waterford-born parents moved to London in the 1960s. Bryan had some racing experience and introduced his son to cycling without pressuring him to compete prematurely.

== Career ==
Healy took early career stage wins in both the 2019 Tour de l'Avenir and the 2021 Giro Next Gen.

Healy was selected to compete in the road race at the 2020 UCI Road World Championships, although he did not finish.

He came to international prominence in 2023 after a strong spring classics season. His results included winning the GP Industria & Artigianato di Larciano, and podium finishes in the Amstel Gold Race, between Tadej Pogačar and Tom Pidcock, and Brabantse Pijl. He finished fourth at Liège–Bastogne–Liège.

Healy made his Grand Tour debut in the 2023 Giro d'Italia and, a week later, won his first Grand Tour stage after a solo break of 50 kilometres on stage eight.

The following season, he competed in his first Tour de France, where he was part of the breakaway on multiple stages, finishing fifth on stage nine. He won the combativity award on stage fourteen.

Healy competed at the 2024 Olympic Games in the road race, where he placed tenth.

At the 2025 Tour de France, Healy claimed a stage win on stage six, the first of his career. Healy was part of an eight-man breakaway, and he attacked and went solo with 42.6 km left. He won with 2 minutes and 44 seconds to the next rider, Quinn Simmons. Healy finished third on stage ten, which meant he led the general classification, making him the first Irishman to wear yellow since Stephen Roche in 1987. He became only the fourth Irishman to wear the yellow jersey following Roche. Healy lost the yellow jersey on stage twelve, finishing thirteen minutes behind stage winner Tadej Pogačar, and falling to eleventh in the general classification. He climbed back up to ninth position on stage fourteen. He finished ninth overall in the general classification. He won the Super Combativity award for the Tour de France.

On 28 September 2025, Healy won a bronze medal in the 2025 UCI Road World Championships road race. It was Ireland's first medal in the event since Sean Kelly won the bronze medal in 1989.

In 2026, Healy crashed whilst re-conning the time trial stage of Itzulia Basque Country, fracturing his sacrum. Despite the injury, he continued to race, and finished the sixth overall in the mountain classification. However, the injury led him to miss the Ardennes classics.

Healy returned at the Tour Auvergne-Rhône-Alpes, after almost two months away from racing. He did not start stage seven due to illness.

Healy was selected for the 2026 Tour de France. He was instrumental in helping Richard Carapaz secure the polka dot jersey on stage twenty, working for his teammate to distance themselves from the peloton over the Col du Galibier.

== Personal life ==
Healy is known for his fashion sense. He has a dog called Olive.

== Major results ==
2017
1st Overall Bizkaiko Itzulia

1st Stage 4

2nd Overall Junior Tour of Wales

1st Young rider classification

3rd Overall Giro di Basilicata

1st Mountains classification
1st Young rider classification

4th Overall Ronde des Vallées

1st Young rider classification

10th La Philippe Gilbert juniors
2018
National Junior Road Championships

1st Time trial
2nd Road race

5th Overall Ronde des Vallées
7th Overall Driedaagse van Axel

1st Stage 3

9th Guido Reybrouck Classic
2019
1st Stage 5 Tour de l'Avenir
2nd Time trial, National Under-23 Road Championships
2020 (1 pro win)
1st Road race, National Road Championships
1st Time trial, National Under-23 Road Championships
1st Stage 4 Ronde de l'Isard
2021
1st Stage 10 Giro Ciclistico d'Italia
4th Time trial, National Road Championships
2022 (1)
National Road Championships

1st Time trial
3rd Road race

6th Time trial, UEC European Road Championships
2023 (5)
National Road Championships

1st Road race
2nd Time trial

1st GP Industria & Artigianato di Larciano
Giro d'Italia

1st Stage 8
Held after Stages 16–17
Combativity award Stages 8 & 15

2nd Amstel Gold Race
2nd Brabantse Pijl
2nd Prueba Villafranca de Ordizia
3rd Overall Tour de Luxembourg

1st Stage 3

3rd Overall Settimana Internazionale di Coppi e Bartali

1st Young rider classification
1st Stage 3

3rd Trofeo Calvia
4th Liège–Bastogne–Liège
5th Overall Région Pays de la Loire Tour

1st Young rider classification

2024 (1)
4th Overall Volta ao Algarve
4th Overall Étoile de Bessèges
7th Road race, UCI Road World Championships
7th Overall Tour of Slovenia

1st Stage 5

7th Overall Région Pays de la Loire Tour
10th Road race, Olympic Games
Combativity award Stage 14 Tour de France
2025 (2)
1st Stage 5 Tour of the Basque Country
3rd Road race, UCI Road World Championships
3rd Liège–Bastogne–Liège
4th Strade Bianche
5th La Flèche Wallonne
6th Overall Tour de Luxembourg
9th Overall Tour de France

1st Stage 6
Held & after Stages 10–11
Combativity award Stages 6, 10, 16 & Overall

10th Amstel Gold Race
2026
2nd Japan Cup
6th Giro dell'Emilia
8th Overall Tirreno–Adriatico
8th Grand Prix Cycliste de Montréal
10th Road race, UCI Road World Championships

=== Grand Tour general classification results timeline ===
Grand Tour	2023	2024	2025	2026
Giro d'Italia	55	—	—	—
Tour de France	—	27	9	59
Vuelta a España	—	—	—	—

=== Classics results timeline ===
Monument	2022	2023	2024	2025	2026
Milan–San Remo	—	—	—	—	—
Tour of Flanders	—	—	—	—	—
Paris–Roubaix	—	—	—	—	—
Liège–Bastogne–Liège	DNF	4	27	3	—
Giro di Lombardia	—	30	49	DNF	
Classic	2022	2023	2024	2025	2026
Strade Bianche	DNF	—	12	4	12
Brabantse Pijl	37	2	—	—	—
Amstel Gold Race	—	2	45	10	—
La Flèche Wallonne	130	32	34	5	—
Clásica de San Sebastián	—	45	—	—	85
Grand Prix Cycliste de Québec	—	84	DNF	—	26
Grand Prix Cycliste de Montréal	—	25	22	—	8
Giro dell'Emilia	—	—	25	—	6

Legend
—	Did not compete
DNF	Did not finish
