= 2025 La Flèche Wallonne =

Cycling race

2025 UCI World Tour, race 18 of 36
- Event poster

Race details
- Dates: 23 April 2025
- Stages: 1
- Distance: 205.2 km (127.5 mi)

Results
	Winner	Tadej Pogačar (SLO)	(UAE Team Emirates XRG)
	Second	Kévin Vauquelin (FRA)	(Arkéa–B&B Hotels)
	Third	Tom Pidcock (GBR)	(Q36.5 Pro Cycling Team)

The 2025 La Flèche Wallonne was a road cycling one-day race that took place on 23 April from the Belgian city of Ciney to the municipality of Huy. It was the 89th edition of La Flèche Wallonne and the 18th event of the 2025 UCI World Tour.

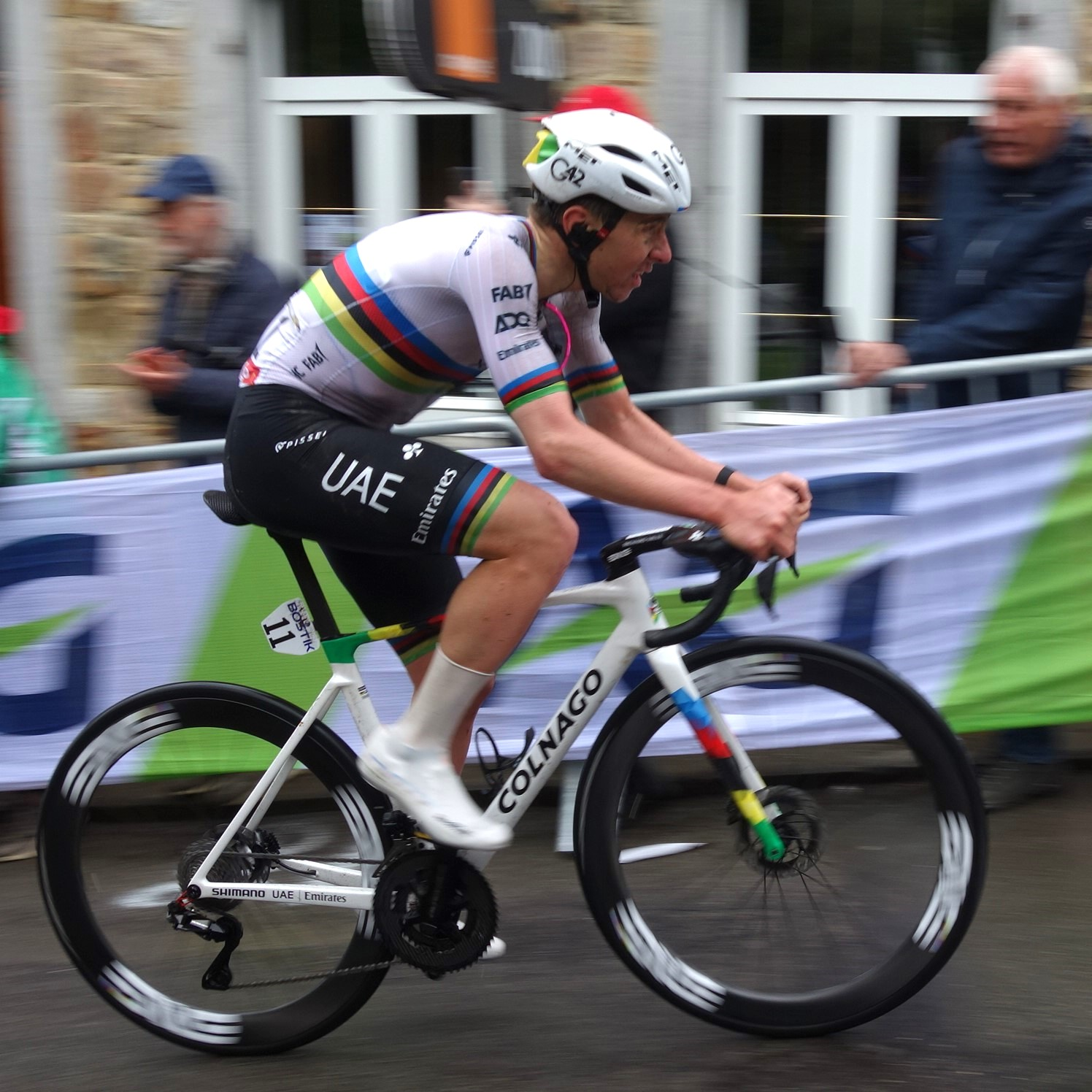
World champion Tadej Pogačar sprinting to the finish on the Mur de Huy.

The winner was Slovenian rider Tadej Pogačar of UAE Team Emirates XRG, who attacked on the final climb of the Mur de Huy and finished 10 seconds ahead of runner-up Kévin Vauquelin. It was the largest winning margin since 2003 and marked Pogačar's second victory at the race.

== Pre-race favorites ==
La Flèche Wallonne is known for its steep final climb up the Mur de Huy, featuring gradients over 20%, which typically favors puncheurs. In pre-race analysis, Tadej Pogačar was considered the leading favorite, having won the race in 2023 and coming off a strong classics season where he won the Tour of Flanders. Also among the top contenders were Mattias Skjelmose, who defeated Pogačar in a sprint at the Amstel Gold Race days earlier, and Olympic champion Remco Evenepoel, coming off his win at the Brabantse Pijl. Defending champion Stephen Williams returned to the race, but was not considered among the main favorites due to poor results in early 2025. Other notable riders mentioned in pre-race coverage included Thibau Nys, Tom Pidcock, Romain Grégoire, Maxim Van Gils, and three-time champion Julian Alaphilippe.

== Teams ==
26 teams took part in the race, including all eighteen UCI WorldTeams and eight UCI ProTeams.

UCI WorldTeams

- Alpecin–Deceuninck
- Arkéa–B&B Hotels
- Cofidis
- Decathlon–AG2R La Mondiale
- EF Education–EasyPost
- Groupama–FDJ
- INEOS Grenadiers
- Intermarché–Wanty
- Lidl–Trek
- Movistar Team
- Red Bull–Bora–Hansgrohe
- Soudal–Quick-Step
- Team Bahrain Victorious
- Team Jayco–AlUla
- Team Picnic–PostNL
- UAE Team Emirates XRG
- Visma–Lease a Bike
- XDS Astana Team

UCI ProTeams

- Israel–Premier Tech
- Lotto
- Q36.5 Pro Cycling Team
- Team Flanders–Baloise
- Team TotalEnergies
- Tudor Pro Cycling Team
- Uno-X Mobility
- Wagner Bazin WB

== Result ==
Result
Rank	Rider	Team	Time
1	Tadej Pogačar (SLO)	UAE Team Emirates XRG	4h 50' 15"
2	Kévin Vauquelin (FRA)	Arkéa–B&B Hotels	+ 10"
3	Tom Pidcock (GBR)	Q36.5 Pro Cycling Team	+ 12"
4	Lenny Martinez (FRA)	Team Bahrain Victorious	+ 13"
5	Ben Healy (IRL)	EF Education–EasyPost	+ 13"
6	Santiago Buitrago (COL)	Team Bahrain Victorious	+ 16"
7	Romain Grégoire (FRA)	Groupama–FDJ	+ 16"
8	Thibau Nys (BEL)	Lidl–Trek	+ 16"
9	Remco Evenepoel (BEL)	Soudal–Quick-Step	+ 16"
10	Mauro Schmid (SUI)	Team Jayco–AlUla	+ 19"
