= 2025 Tour de France =

Cycling race

2025 UCI World Tour, race 26 of 36
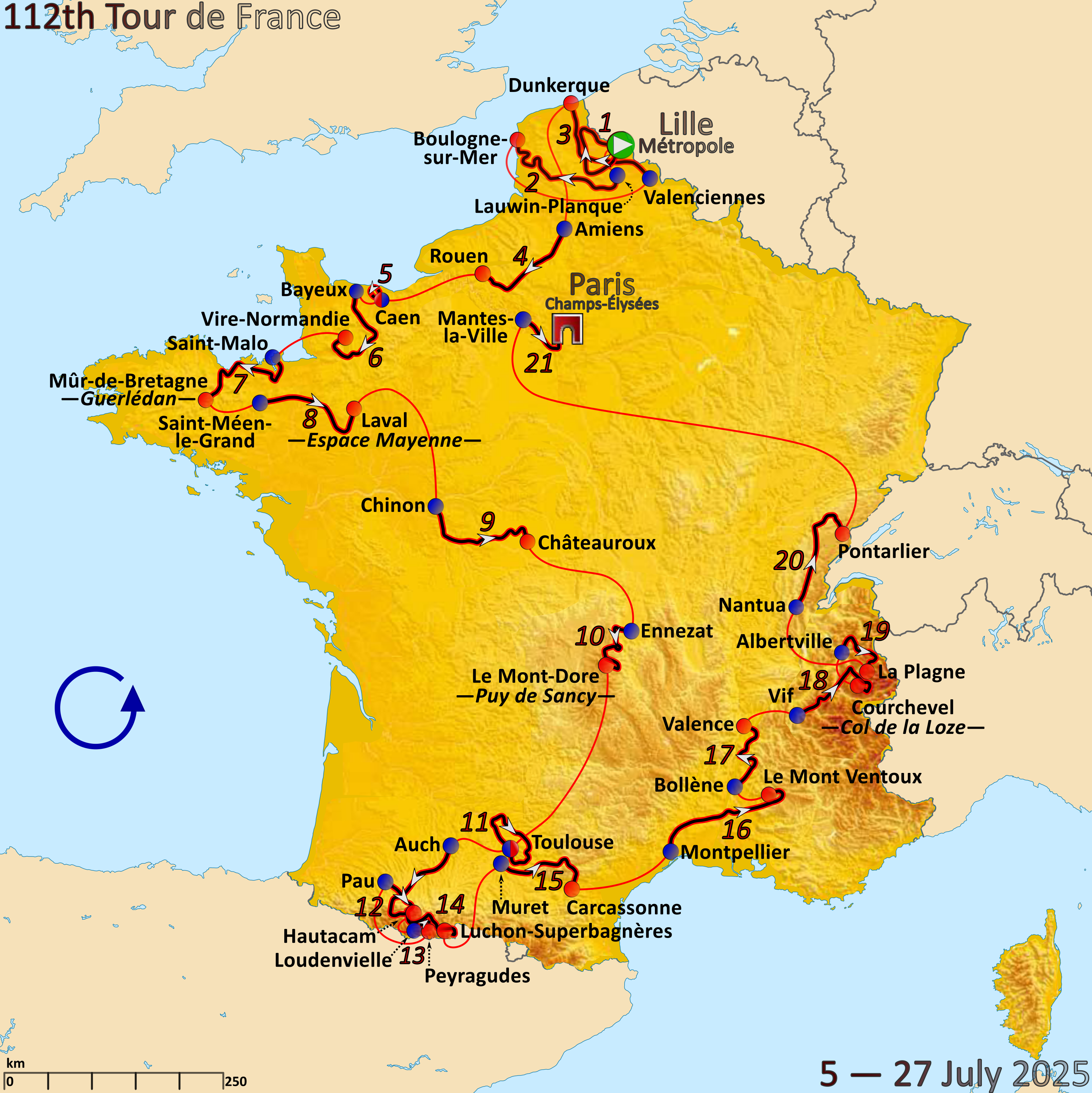
- Route of the 2025 Tour de France

Race details
- Dates: 5–27 July 2025
- Stages: 21
- Distance: 3,301.9 km (2,051.7 mi)
- Winning time: 76h 00' 32"

Results
Jersey awarded to the overall winner	Winner	Tadej Pogačar (SLO)	(UAE Team Emirates XRG)
	Second	Jonas Vingegaard (DEN)	(Visma–Lease a Bike)
	Third	Florian Lipowitz (GER)	(Red Bull–Bora–Hansgrohe)
Jersey awarded to the points classification winner	Points	Jonathan Milan (ITA)	(Lidl–Trek)
Jersey awarded to the mountains classification winner	Mountains	Tadej Pogačar (SLO)	(UAE Team Emirates XRG)
Jersey awarded to the young rider classification winner	Young rider	Florian Lipowitz (GER)	(Red Bull–Bora–Hansgrohe)
Jersey awarded to the combativity classification winner	Combativity	Ben Healy (IRL)	(EF Education–EasyPost)
Jersey awarded to the team classification winner	Team	(Netherlands) Visma–Lease a Bike	

The 2025 Tour de France was the 112th edition of the Tour de France. It started in Lille on 5 July, and finished with the final stage at Champs-Élysées, Paris, on 27 July.

Tadej Pogačar of UAE Team Emirates XRG won the general classification, marking his fourth victory in the race in the past six editions. His advantage began to grow after winning the fourth stage to Rouen and placing second in the first individual time trial. After winning the seventh stage to Mûr-de-Bretagne, Pogačar solidified his advantage in the Pyrenees, dominating the first mountain stage to Hautacam and the mountain time trial to Peyragudes the following day. He held off attacks from other general classification (GC) contenders in the final week to win the race by almost four and a half minutes. Second place overall went to Jonas Vingegaard of Visma–Lease a Bike. He was consistently the second-best climber in the race but he lost a total of more than three minutes to Pogačar in the first individual time trial and the mountain stage to Hautacam. The last step on the podium was occupied by Florian Lipowitz of Red Bull–Bora–Hansgrohe. He gradually built his advantage over fourth place in the first two weeks before holding off the challenge of Oscar Onley of Team Picnic–PostNL in the final week. Lipowitz became the first German to finish on the podium of the Tour since Andreas Klöden in 2006.

The points classification was won by Jonathan Milan of Lidl–Trek. He won two sprint stages while also placing consistently in the intermediate sprints. In addition to placing third in the GC, Lipowitz also took the white jersey as the best rider under the age of 26 while the mountains classification went to Pogačar in addition to winning the general classification. The teams classification was won by Visma–Lease a Bike. The award for the race's most combative rider went to Ben Healy of EF Education–EasyPost, who won a hilly stage during the first week, and wore the yellow jersey for two days before placing ninth overall.

== Teams ==
Twenty-three teams took part in the race. All 18 UCI WorldTeams were automatically invited. They were joined by five UCI ProTeams: the two highest ranked UCI ProTeams in 2024 (Lotto and Israel–Premier Tech), along with three teams (Team TotalEnergies, Tudor Pro Cycling Team and Uno-X Mobility) selected by Amaury Sport Organisation (ASO), the organisers of the Tour.

Union Cycliste Internationale (UCI) rules allow 22 teams to enter a Grand Tour – 18 UCI WorldTeams, the two highest ranked UCI ProTeams from the previous season and two teams invited by the organisers. Grand Tour race organisers ASO and RCS Sport asked the UCI to allow an additional wildcard team to be invited to Grand Tour events, after lobbying from smaller teams competing for the wildcard slots. Larger teams were reported to not support the request, with Visma–Lease a Bike noting that an additional team would decrease safety. In March 2025, the UCI announced that 23 teams would be permitted in 2025, allowing an additional ProTeam to be invited. ASO subsequently announced the teams on 31 March 2025. A total of 184 riders from 27 nationalities started the race, with France having the largest contingent (38 riders).

=== UCI WorldTeams ===
- Alpecin–Deceuninck
- Arkéa–B&B Hotels
- Cofidis
- Decathlon–AG2R La Mondiale
- EF Education–EasyPost
- Groupama–FDJ
- INEOS Grenadiers
- Intermarché–Wanty
- Lidl–Trek
- Movistar Team
- Red Bull–Bora–Hansgrohe
- Soudal–Quick-Step
- Team Bahrain Victorious
- Team Picnic–PostNL
- Team Jayco–AlUla
- UAE Team Emirates XRG
- Visma–Lease a Bike
- XDS Astana Team

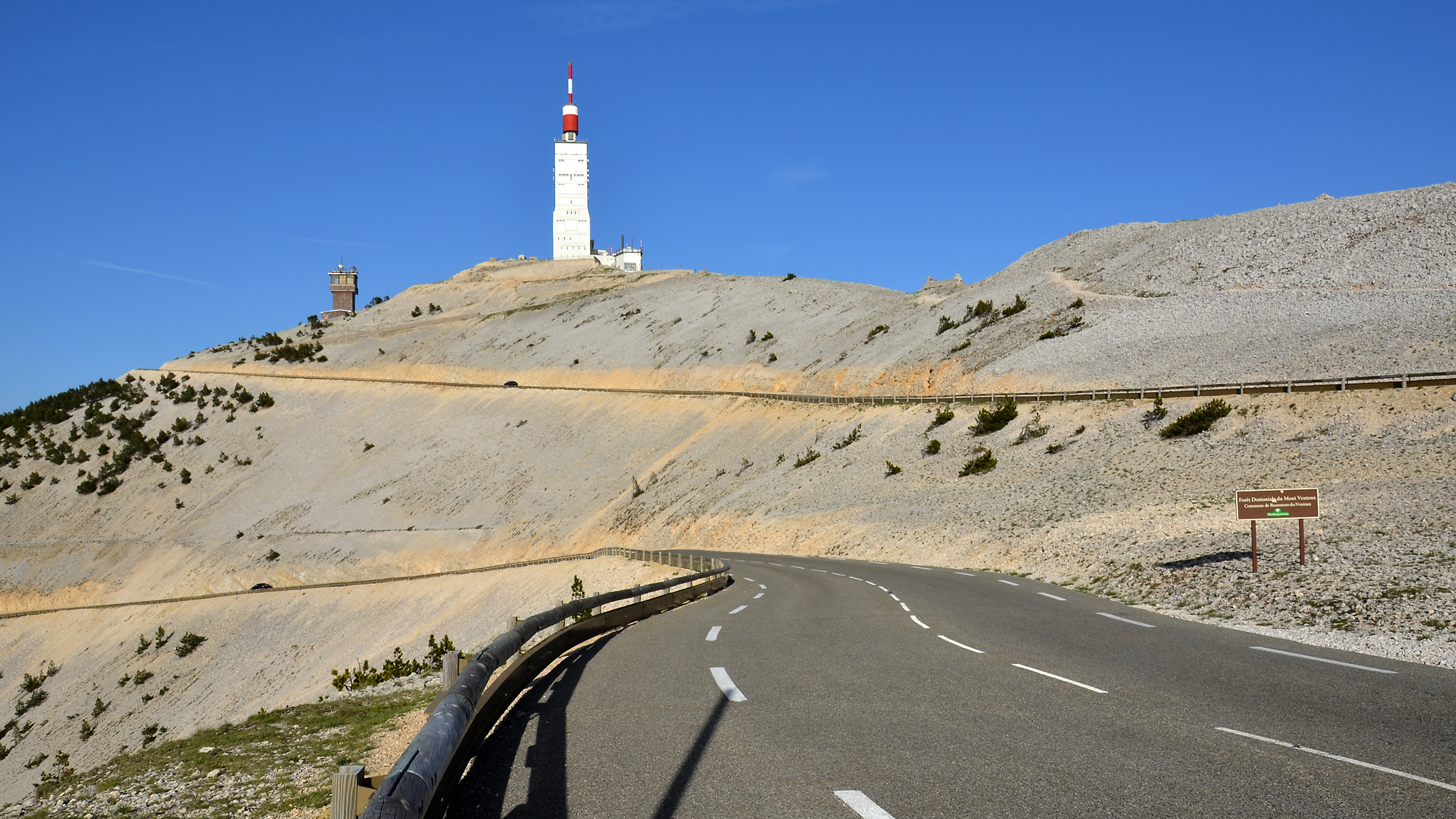
On stage 16, the Tour had a summit finish at Mont Ventoux (elevation of 1,910 m (6,270 ft)) for the first time since 2013

=== UCI ProTeams ===
- Israel–Premier Tech
- Lotto
- Team TotalEnergies
- Tudor Pro Cycling Team
- Uno-X Mobility

== Route and stages ==
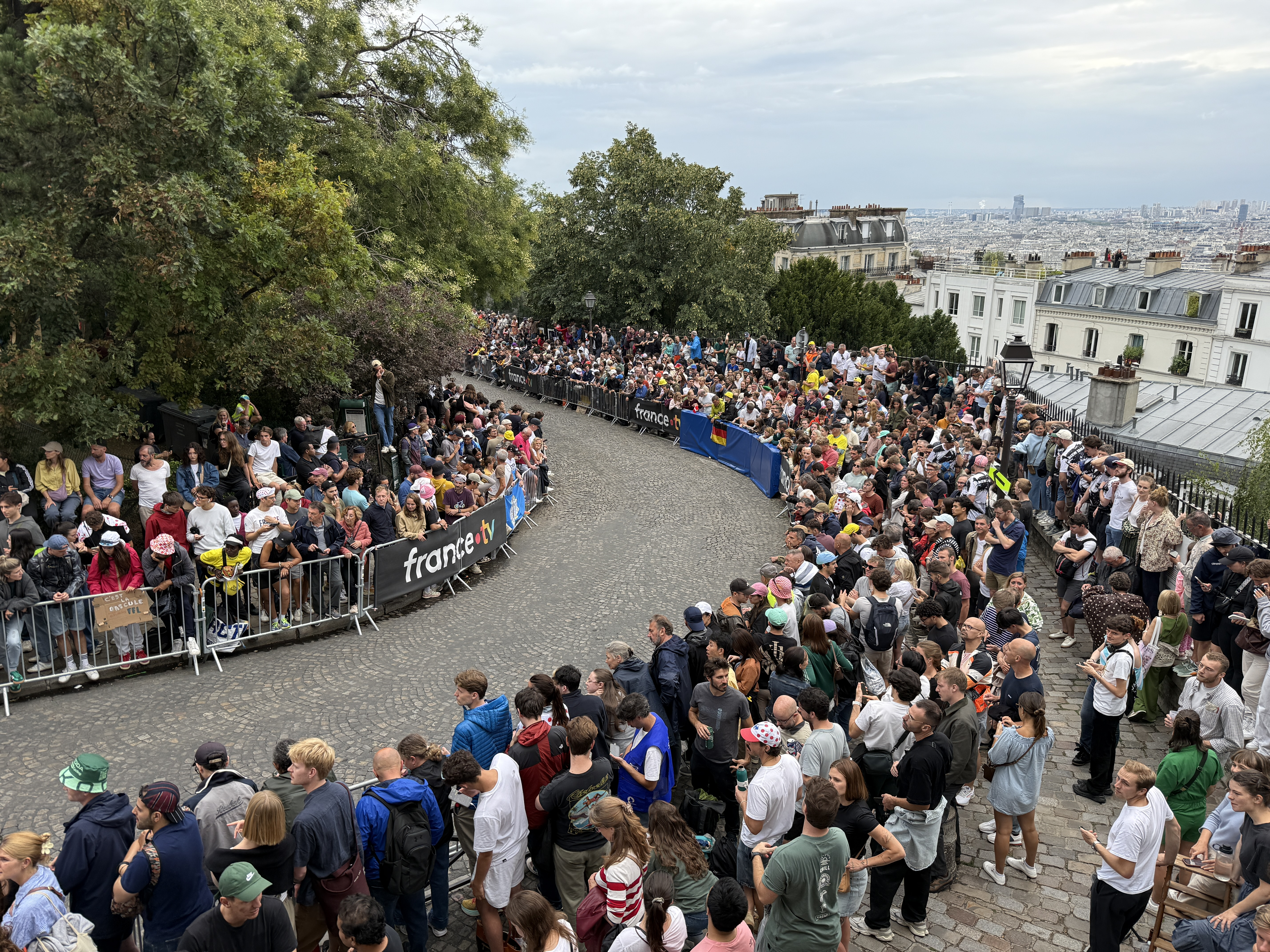
Large crowds attended the final stage of the race in Montmartre in Paris

On 30 November 2023, it was announced that the Grand Départ would take place in Lille. The full route was announced on 29 October 2024 by Christian Prudhomme. The route was considered to be in two halves, with flat and hilly stages for the first 10 stages, followed by mountainous stages in the Pyrenees and Alps before a return to the traditional finish on the Champs-Élysées in Paris. The race featured five summit finishes, including at Col de la Loze and Mont Ventoux. The race featured just 44 km (27 mi) of individual time trial, with a 11 km (6.8 mi) mountain time trial to the Peyragudes altiport on stage 13. The race was the first to take place wholly in France since the 2020 edition.

Reacting to the route, Rouleur stated that "the climbing in the second half of the race is relentless" and Vélo Magazine predicted "plenty of drama" from a route "heavy on uphill finals and explosive breakaway stages". Defending champion Tadej Pogačar called the route "brutal", expressing his interest in the uphill time trial to Peyragudes.

In May 2025, it was announced that the final stage in Paris would include laps of a circuit inspired by the road races at the Paris 2024 Summer Olympics, with climbs of Montmartre before the traditional finish on the Champs-Élysées. Some riders criticised the change, with Remco Evenepoel stating that he didn't like the idea, Wout van Aert, who would go on to win the stage, called it "dangerous", and Jasper Philipsen said it was "a shame to see this stage change".

Stage characteristics
Stage	Date	Course	Distance	Type	Winner
1	5 July	Lille to Lille	184.9 km (114.9 mi)	Flat stage	Jasper Philipsen (BEL)
2	6 July	Lauwin-Planque to Boulogne-sur-Mer	209.1 km (129.9 mi)	Hilly stage	Mathieu van der Poel (NED)
3	7 July	Valenciennes to Dunkirk	178.3 km (110.8 mi)	Flat stage	Tim Merlier (BEL)
4	8 July	Amiens to Rouen	174.2 km (108.2 mi)	Hilly stage	Tadej Pogačar (SLO)
5	9 July	Caen to Caen	33 km (21 mi)	Individual time trial	Remco Evenepoel (BEL)
6	10 July	Bayeux to Vire Normandie	201.5 km (125.2 mi)	Hilly stage	Ben Healy (IRL)
7	11 July	Saint-Malo to Guerlédan (Mûr-de-Bretagne)	197 km (122 mi)	Hilly stage	Tadej Pogačar (SLO)
8	12 July	Saint-Méen-le-Grand to Laval	171.4 km (106.5 mi)	Flat stage	Jonathan Milan (ITA)
9	13 July	Chinon to Châteauroux	174.1 km (108.2 mi)	Flat stage	Tim Merlier (BEL)
10	14 July	Ennezat to Mont-Dore (Puy de Sancy)	165.3 km (102.7 mi)	Mountain stage	Simon Yates (GBR)
	15 July	Toulouse	Rest day		
11	16 July	Toulouse to Toulouse	156.8 km (97.4 mi)	Flat stage	Jonas Abrahamsen (NOR)
12	17 July	Auch to Hautacam	180.6 km (112.2 mi)	Mountain stage	Tadej Pogačar (SLO)
13	18 July	Loudenvielle to Peyragudes	10.9 km (6.8 mi)	Mountain time trial	Tadej Pogačar (SLO)
14	19 July	Pau to Superbagnères	182.6 km (113.5 mi)	Mountain stage	Thymen Arensman (NED)
15	20 July	Muret to Carcassonne	169.3 km (105.2 mi)	Hilly stage	Tim Wellens (BEL)
	21 July	Montpellier	Rest day		
16	22 July	Montpellier to Mont Ventoux	171.5 km (106.6 mi)	Mountain stage	Valentin Paret-Peintre (FRA)
17	23 July	Bollène to Valence	160.4 km (99.7 mi)	Flat stage	Jonathan Milan (ITA)
18	24 July	Vif to Courchevel (Col de la Loze)	171.5 km (106.6 mi)	Mountain stage	Ben O'Connor (AUS)
19	25 July	Albertville to La Plagne	93.1 km (57.8 mi) (Note: The route of stage 19 was modified the day before due to an outbreak of contagious nodular dermatitis among cattle on the Col des Saisies. The new route by-passed the categorized climbs of the Col des Saisies and Le Cote d'Héry sur Ugine before rejoining the originally scheduled route just before Beaufort, reducing the stage distance from 129.9 km (81 mi) to 93.1 km (58 mi).)	Mountain stage	Thymen Arensman (NED)
20	26 July	Nantua to Pontarlier	184.2 km (114.5 mi)	Hilly stage	Kaden Groves (AUS)
21	27 July	Mantes-la-Ville to Paris (Champs-Élysées)	132.3 km (82.2 mi)	Flat stage	Wout van Aert (BEL)
Total			3,301.9 km (2,051.7 mi)		

== Pre-race favourites ==
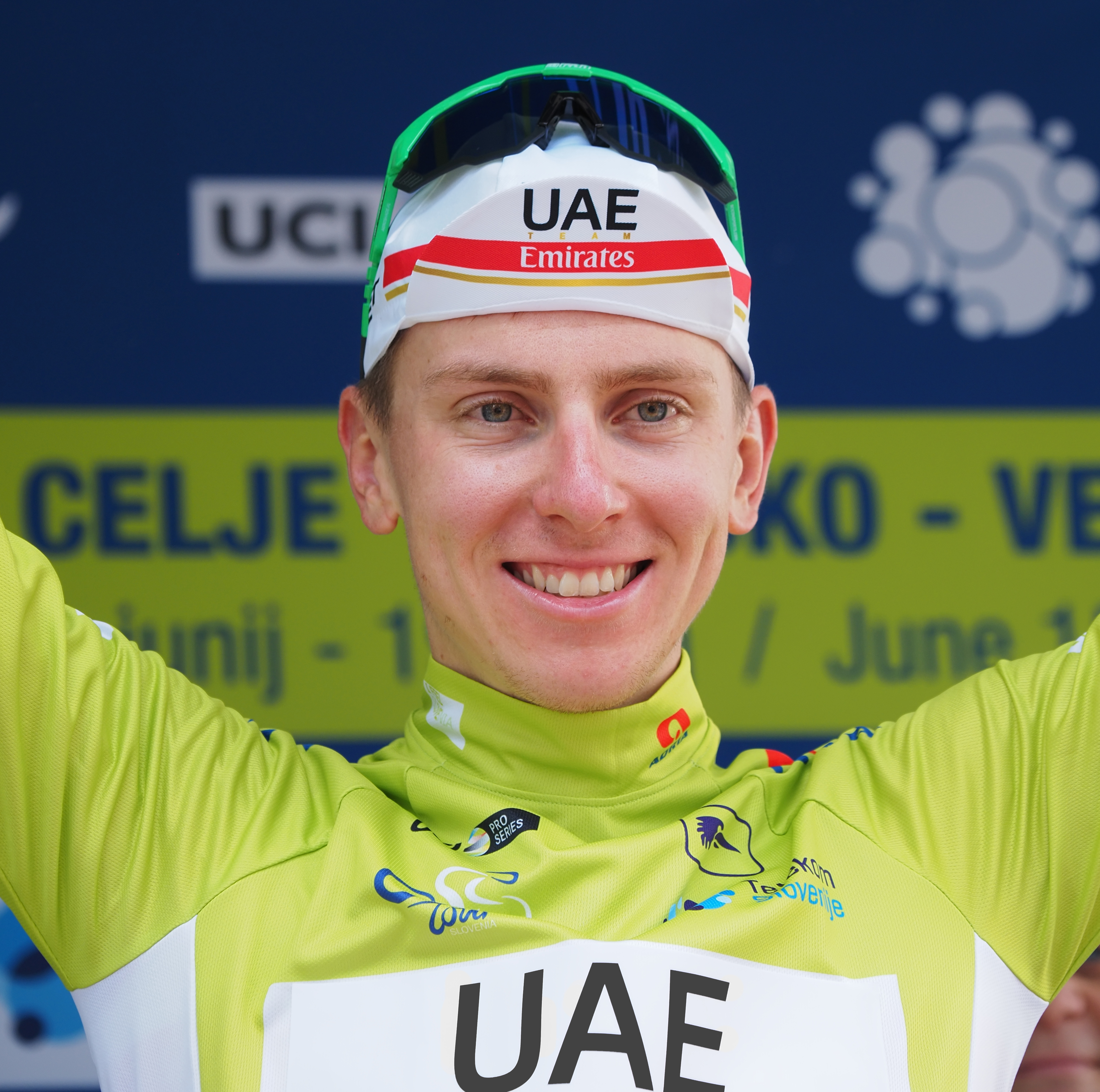
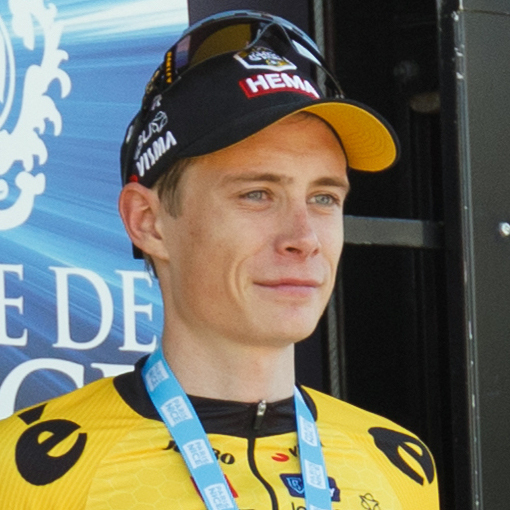
Tadej Pogačar (left) and Jonas Vingegaard (right) were considered favourites for the general classification (GC)

Prior to the race, Tadej Pogačar, Jonas Vingegaard, and Remco Evenepoel were widely considered to be the major contenders for the overall general classification (GC), with defending champion Pogačar considered favourite following his win at the Critérium du Dauphiné. Top competitors for the green jersey of the points classification were considered to be former winner Jasper Philipsen, Tim Merlier, Jonathan Milan, and defending winner Biniam Girmay. Riders considered outside contenders for the green jersey included Mathieu van der Poel, former winner Wout van Aert, and Pogačar. Evenepoel was widely considered to be the favourite for the white jersey of the young rider classification, with some expecting a strong challenge from Florian Lipowitz and Mattias Skjelmose.

== Race overview ==
=== Week one ===
The first week of the Tour was in the north of France, with the first stage of the Tour around Lille featuring a flat course that offered an opportunity for the sprinters to take the first yellow jersey. With 17 kilometres (11 mi) to go, Visma–Lease a Bike split the peloton in the crosswinds. In the reduced bunch sprint, Jasper Philipsen (Alpecin–Deceuninck) won the stage ahead of last year's green jersey winner, Biniam Girmay (Intermarché–Wanty). GC contenders who made the front split such as Tadej Pogačar (UAE Team Emirates XRG) and Jonas Vingegaard (Visma–Lease a Bike) gained 39 seconds on some GCcontenders, including Remco Evenepoel (Soudal–Quick-Step).

The second stage to Boulogne-sur-Mer featured a hilly parcours that favored the puncheurs, with three climbs occurring in the last 30 kilometres (19 mi). In the finale of the stage, riders such as Vingegaard, Matteo Jorgenson (Visma–Lease a Bike), Kévin Vauquelin (Arkéa–B&B Hotels), and Florian Lipowitz (Red Bull–Bora–Hansgrohe) attempted some attacks but the stage was decided by a small bunch sprint, where Mathieu van der Poel (Alpecin–Deceuninck) held off Pogačar to win the stage and take the yellow jersey in the process.

The third stage to Dunkirk was another flat route with only one late fourth-category climb. Because of this, no riders attempted to form a breakaway. In the intermediate sprint, Philipsen went down heavily, forcing him to abandon the race. There were two more crashes in the final 5 kilometres (3.1 mi), causing some riders to suffer abrasions. In the sprint, Tim Merlier (Soudal–Quick-Step) narrowly beat Jonathan Milan (Lidl–Trek) in a photo-finish. No rider was awarded the combativity award, with media noting that "nothing noteworthy occurred during 99% of the [stage]".

Much like stage 2, the fourth stage to Rouen was another hilly parcours. It featured the Rampe Saint-Hilaire in the city of Rouen, an 800-metre (2,600 ft) long climb with an average gradient of 10.6%, which topped with 5 kilometres (3.1 mi) to go. On that climb, Pogačar launched a big attack, with Vingegaard the only rider able to follow despite being briefly dropped. They were caught by a small chase group led by Evenepoel on the descent. Evenepoel and Jorgenson attempted some counter-attacks but they were not able to get a significant gap. In the sprint, Pogačar managed to come around van der Poel to win the stage, taking his 100th career victory in the process. Van der Poel kept the yellow jersey.

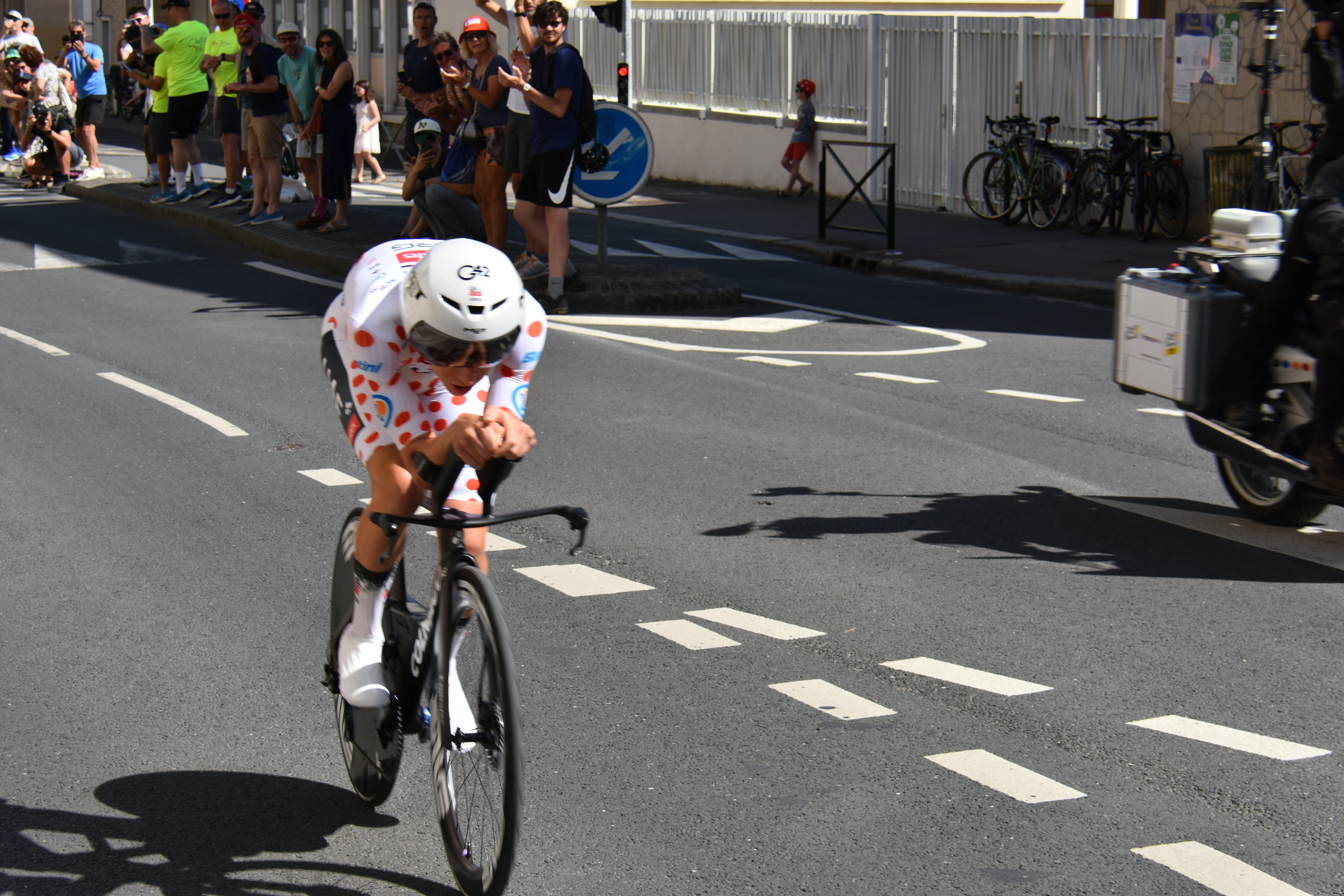
Tadej Pogačar riding the stage 5 time trial in the polka-dot jersey of the mountains classification

The fifth stage featured the first individual time trial of the race in Caen, contested over a 33-kilometre (21 mi) flat parcours. Evenepoel, the current World and Olympic time trial champion, won the stage by 16 seconds over Pogačar. Vingegaard lost significant time to his main GC rivals, more than a minute behind Evenepoel and Pogačar. In the GC, Pogačar took over the yellow jersey, 42 seconds ahead of Evenepoel. Vingegaard sat in fourth at 1' 13" down.

The following stage was contested on a hilly parcours in "Norman Switzerland" with six small categorized climbs. The finish in Vire Normandie featured a 700-metre (2,300 ft) climb with an average gradient of over 10%. A long fight to enter the break ensued until an eight-man group formed, including van der Poel. With around 42 kilometres (26 mi) remaining in the stage, Ben Healy (EF Education–EasyPost) made the stage-winning move, gradually extending his lead all the way to the finish to win his first Tour stage. The GC group was led by Pogačar across the line at almost five and a half minutes down. Van der Poel took back the yellow jersey by one second after gaining 1' 29" on the GC favourites.

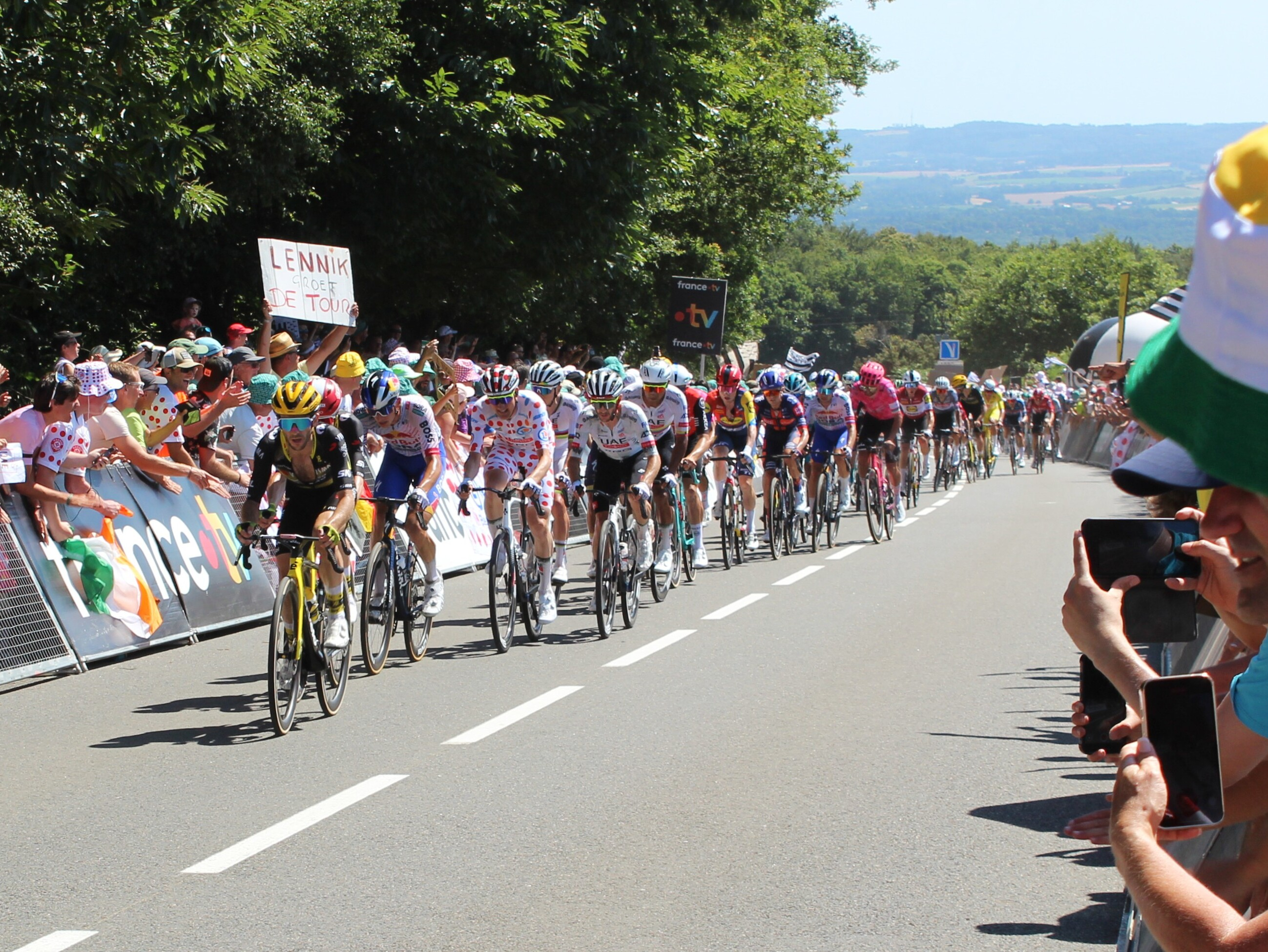
Peloton climbing the Mûr-de-Bretagne on stage 7

Stage seven in Brittany featured a double ascent of the Mûr-de-Bretagne in the final 20 kilometres (12 mi). With 6.5 kilometres (4.0 mi) remaining, there was a high-speed crash that involved several riders, most notably Pogačar's teammate João Almeida who suffered a broken rib but continued in the race. Almeida ended up losing 10 minutes on the day to drop out of GC contention. In the uphill sprint to the finish, Pogačar held off Vingegaard to take his second stage win of the race. Pogačar retook the yellow jersey after van der Poel was dropped on the climb.

The next two stages took place on flat parcours that offered two more chances for the sprinters to go for the win. On stage 8, Milan won the intermediate sprint and beat Wout van Aert (Visma–Lease a Bike) and Kaden Groves (Alpecin–Deceuninck) in a sprint at the finish, thereby regaining the lead in the points classification. On stage 9, Merlier outsprinted Milan and Arnaud De Lie to take his second stage of the race after the peloton chased down an all-day breakaway by van der Poel and his Alpecin–Deceuninck teammate, Jonas Rickaert, that was only caught inside the final kilometre. During stage 9, Almeida abandoned the race due to his injuries from his crash on stage 7. Stage 9 was the second-fastest in Tour history at 50.013 km/h (31.077 mph), owing to the tailwind and the chase for the Alpecin–Deceuninck breakaway.

The last stage before the first rest day featured the first mountain stage of the race in the Massif Central with eight categorized climbs and a finish on Puy de Sancy (3.3 km at 8%). A group of 29 riders broke free on the first climb of the day with UAE Team Emirates XRG content to let them fight for the stage win. On the final climb, Simon Yates (Visma–Lease a Bike) attacked twice, dropping the four survivors in the breakaway to win the stage. Healy finished third on the stage, taking the yellow jersey and the lead of the young rider classification. In the peloton, Visma–Lease a Bike attacked multiple times in the last 30 kilometres (19 mi) with Jorgenson but Pogačar quickly responded each time. Pogačar himself attacked on the final climb with Vingegaard the only rider able to respond. Both riders finished with a small gap on the other main GC contenders.

=== Week two ===
The second week began with a mostly flat stage around Toulouse with a sting in the tail as there were four short categorized climbs in the final 50 kilometres (31 mi). The final climb, the Côte de Pech David, (800 m at 12.4%) topped with just 8.8 kilometres (5.5 mi) to go. A big fight for the break ensued for most of the stage until five riders clipped off the front. A five-man chase group, including van der Poel and van Aert, was also allowed to go in pursuit of the main break. In the end, two riders from the break, Jonas Abrahamsen (Uno-X Mobility) and Mauro Schmid (Team Jayco–AlUla), sprinted for the win with Abrahamsen taking his and his team's first Grand Tour stage. In the peloton, there was a crash involving Pogačar in the final 10 kilometres (6.2 mi) but he was not seriously hurt. The GC group waited for Pogačar and he didn't lose any time.

The race entered the Pyrenees mountains, with stage 12 being the first high mountain stage of the Tour – finishing at the top of the Hautacam (13.5 km at 7.8%). A 52-man break went away but their maximum advantage was only around two minutes as the GC group fought for the win. On Hautacam, UAE Team Emirates XRG set a hard tempo from the bottom of the climb, starting with Tim Wellens followed by Jhonatan Narváez. With 12 kilometres (7.5 mi) left on the climb, Pogačar attacked and immediately distanced Vingegaard, extending his advantage all the way to the top and winning by just over two minutes over Vingegaard. Lipowitz emerged as the strongest of the rest, finishing only 11 seconds down on Vingegaard. Healy lost 13 minutes, falling to 11th overall as Pogačar regained the yellow jersey with an advantage of over three and a half minutes over Vingegaard. Evenepoel, who struggled for much of the day, kept his podium position at almost five minutes down – but regained the white jersey of the young rider classification.

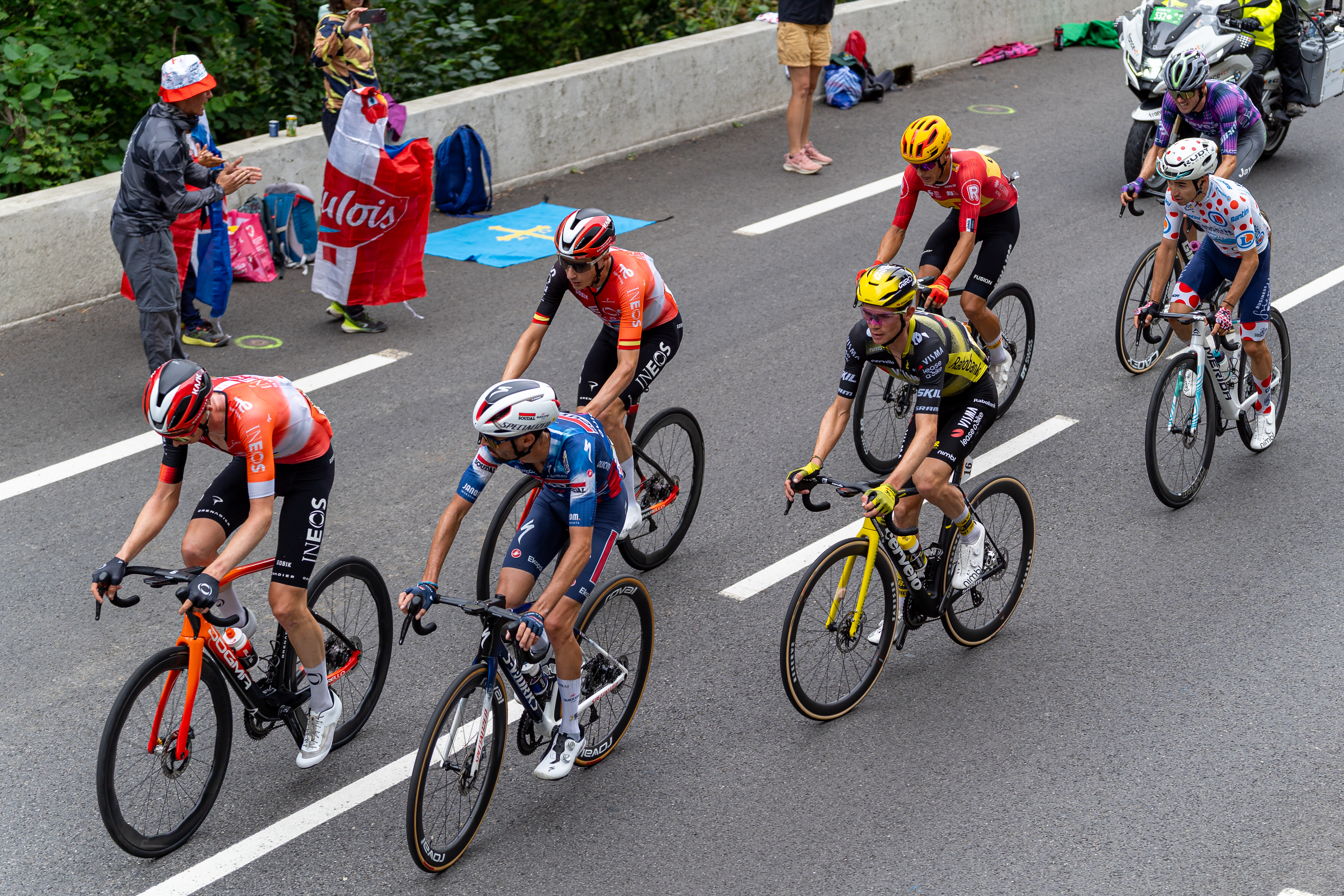
Breakaway on stage 14, including eventual stage winner Thymen Arensman

The following day, the riders tackled the second individual time trial of the race, featuring a 10.9-kilometre (6.8 mi) mountain time trial on the slopes of Peyragudes. Luke Plapp (Team Jayco–AlUla) set the early benchmark time of 24' 58", a time that stood until Primož Roglič (Red Bull–Bora–Hansgrohe) went 38 seconds quicker. Roglič was in the hot seat until Vingegaard beat Roglič's time by 44 seconds after overtaking Evenepoel near the finish. However, his time was immediately bested by Pogačar, who extended his GC advantage to over four minutes after winning the stage by 36 seconds over Vingegaard. It marked his fourth stage win in this race and his 21st overall in the Tour.

Stage 14 was the last day in the Pyrenees – with the Col du Tourmalet, Col d'Aspin, and the Col de Peyresourde before a summit finish at the Superbagnères ski station. On the slopes of the Tourmalet, Evenepoel began to slow behind the peloton and he would eventually abandon the race from 3rd place overall. Evenepoel's team subsequently reported that he left the race to "preserve the rest of his season". Thymen Arensman (INEOS Grenadiers) was the strongest rider in the 17-man break, attacking on the Peyresourde and winning the stage by a minute. In the peloton, Vingegaard attacked multiple times on the final climb but Pogačar was able to respond. Pogačar surged past Vingegaard in the final metres to gain four seconds on the road and finish second on the day. With Evenepoel's abandon, Lipowitz took over the third place on GC as well as the white jersey of the young rider classification.

Stage 15 to Carcassonne was the last stage before the second rest day – with a parcours that was expected to suit the breakaway. At the start of the stage, there was a crash that split the peloton and involved riders such as Vingegaard and Lipowitz. The peloton eventually reformed after a 15-man break went. More riders joined the break on the first climb of the day, where a group of eight attacked off the front. With 43.5 kilometres (27.0 mi) left, Wellens made the stage-winning move, soloing to the finish line by more than a minute and completing his collection of winning a stage at all three Grand Tours. The peloton finished more than six minutes down.

=== Week three ===
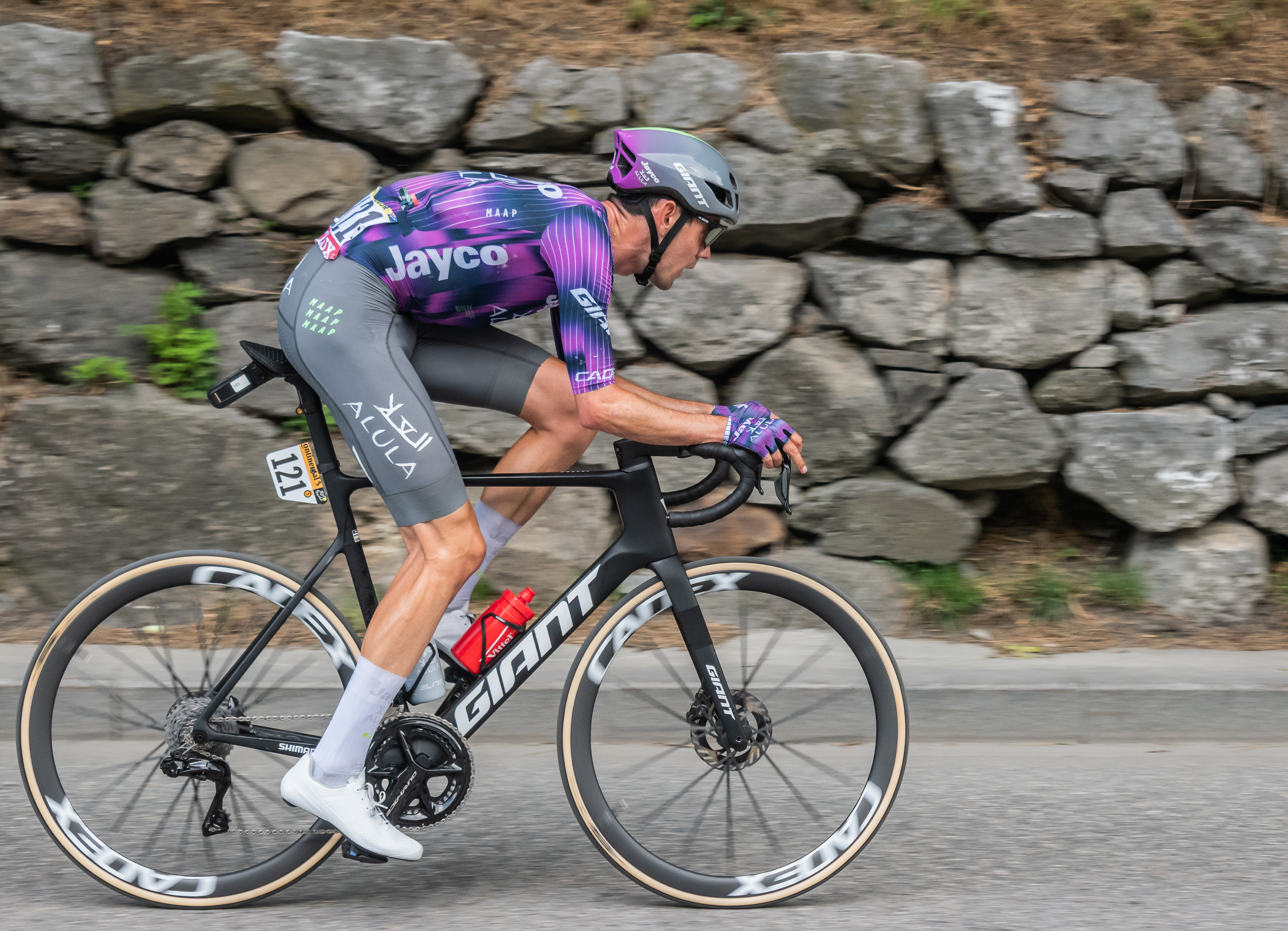
Ben O'Connor, winner of stage 18

After the last rest day, the riders were faced with a mountain stage finishing atop Mont Ventoux. A 36-man group escaped from the peloton inside the final 100 kilometres (62 mi), staying away until the finish. On the final climb to Mont Ventoux, Valentin Paret-Peintre (Soudal–Quick-Step), Santiago Buitrago (Team Bahrain Victorious), and Healy emerged as the strongest from the break. Paret-Peintre outsprinted Healy at the line to become the first Frenchman to win a stage in this year's Tour. In the peloton, Vingegaard attacked Pogačar several times but Pogačar was able to respond each time. At the finish, Pogačar gapped Vingegaard by two seconds to add to his overall lead.

Stage 17 to Valence offered the first sprint opportunity since stage nine. The race headed to the expected bunch sprint but a crash in the peloton just before the flamme rouge caused a small group to contest for the win. Milan held off Jordi Meeus (Red Bull–Bora–Hansgrohe) in the final sprint to win his second stage of the race. By gaining 61 points on the day, Milan extended his lead in the points classification to 72 points over Pogačar.

The eighteenth stage was the first of two stages in the Alps. Considered the queen stage of the race, it featured three hors categorie climbs with a summit finish on Col de la Loze. A 14-man break including Roglič and Felix Gall (Decathlon–AG2R La Mondiale) was able to break away on Col du Glandon. On the Col de la Madeleine, Visma–Lease a Bike set a furious pace before Vingegaard launched an attack that was only answered by Pogačar. The duo reached the front group near the summit of the climb. On the valley section before Col de la Loze, Ben O'Connor (Team Jayco–AlUla), Einer Rubio (Movistar Team), and Jorgenson attacked off the front, gaining more than three minutes on the group containing Pogačar and Vingegaard. O'Connor turned out to be the strongest of the three and won the stage solo. Inside the final kilometre, Pogačar dropped Vingegaard, increasing his GC advantage to almost four and a half minutes over Vingegaard. The fight for the last podium spot also intensified as Onley gained more than a minute and a half on Lipowitz, closing in to within 22 seconds of him.

Stage 19 was the final mountain stage, originally planned to include five climbs with a summit finish on La Plagne. However, an outbreak of contagious nodular dermatitis among cattle on the Col des Saisies forced organizers to reroute the stage, removing the two classified climbs and shortening the overall length of the stage to 93.1 kilometres (57.8 mi). On the final climb to La Plagne, Arensman made several attacks to go clear of the GC group. He held off Vingegaard and Pogačar by a mere two seconds to win his second stage of the race. Lipowitz solidified his third place on GC after gaining 41 seconds on Onley.

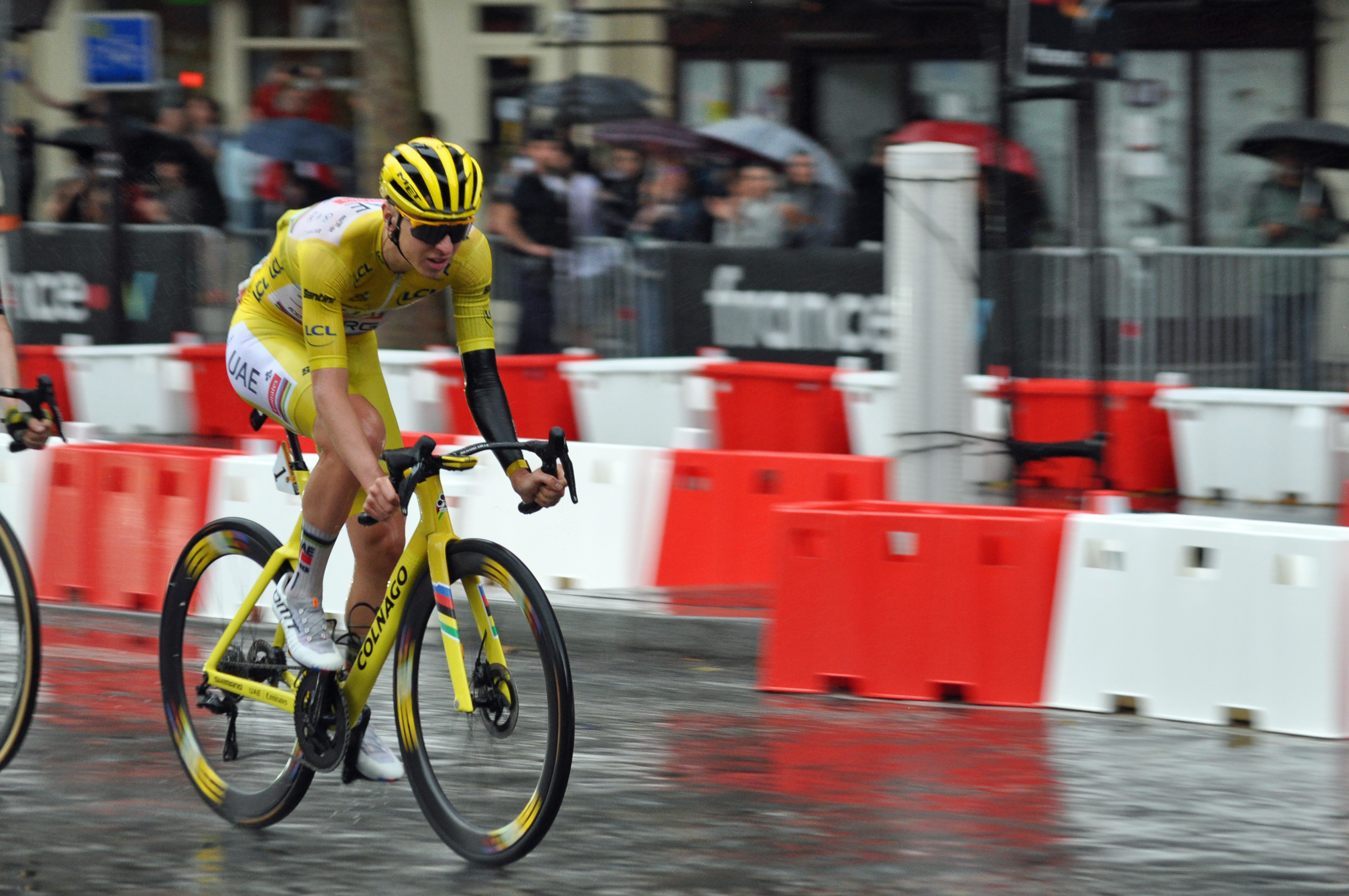
Tadej Pogačar on stage 21 in Paris

The penultimate stage of the race featured a hilly parcours from Nantua to Pontarlier. The stage was expected to suit riders from the break. A 13-man group escaped after a long fight to create the break. The group included Jordan Jegat (Team TotalEnergies), who was 11th overall and just four minutes behind O'Connor in tenth place overall. Towards the finish, Kaden Groves (Alpecin–Deceuninck) emerged as the strongest rider from the break, soloing off the front with 16.5 kilometres (10.3 mi) to go. He won the stage by almost a minute to complete his collection of stage wins at all three Grand Tours. Jegat gained six minutes on O'Connor to move into the top ten on GC.

The final stage of the race returned to Paris with the traditional final stage to Champs-Élysées. However, unlike previous editions of the Tour, the stage included climbs of Côte de la Butte Montmartre before the finish on the Champs-Élysées, inspired by the road races at the Paris 2024 Summer Olympics. Before the race reached the final circuit, the GC was neutralized after rain began to fall. Pogačar animated the race on the climbs, pulling a group of six clear during the second ascent of the Montmartre. During the final time up Montmartre, van Aert managed to drop Pogačar to solo to the victory. Pogačar finished fourth to confirm his fourth Tour victory. Milan and Lipowitz also finished the stage safely to confirm their victories in the points and young rider classifications respectively.

=== Results ===
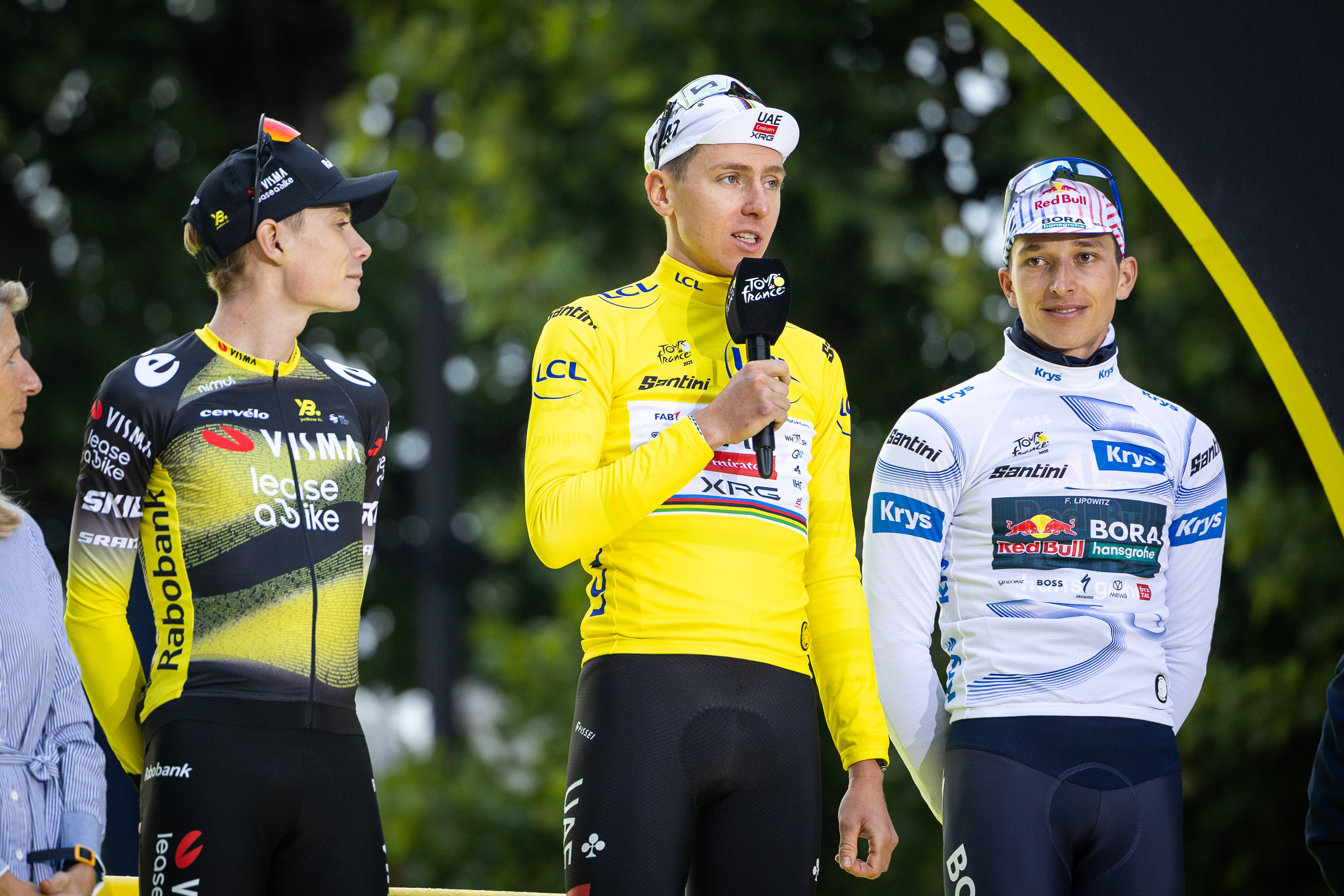
The final general classification podium, from left to right: Jonas Vingegaard, Tadej Pogačar, Florian Lipowitz

In the general classification, Pogačar won the Tour for the fourth time, with Vingegaard in second 4 minutes 24 seconds behind. Lipowitz was third, 11 minutes behind Pogačar. Lipowitz was the first German to finish on the podium of the Tour since Andreas Klöden in 2006. The points classification was won by Milan with 372 points, ahead of Pogačar and Girmay. Pogačar also won the mountains classification, ahead of Vingegaard and Lenny Martinez (Team Bahrain Victorious). The young rider classification was won by Lipowitz. The team of second place Vingegaard, Visma–Lease a Bike, won the team classification. Healy was chosen as the most combative rider. Simone Consonni was the Lanterne rouge, with his overall time around 5 hours and 50 minutes behind Pogačar. Of the 184 riders who started the race, 160 reached the finish in Paris, one of the lowest drop out rates in the 21st century.

During the race, The Athletic's Jacob Whitehead called Pogačar "a possible equal of Eddy Merckx — or more" in light of his "crushing dominance" at the Tour. Following the race, organisers ASO stated that the final stage in Montmartre "exceeded our expectations" and that the stage would likely return in future editions of the Tour.

In the autumn of 2025, Pogačar revealed had developed a knee injury in the final week of the race, with his teammate Wellens revealing that Pogačar had considered abandoning.

== Classification leadership ==
Classification leadership by stage
Stage	Winner	General classification	Points classification	Mountains classification	Young rider classification	Team classification	Combativity award
1	Jasper Philipsen	Jasper Philipsen	Jasper Philipsen (Note: On stage 2, Anthony Turgis, who was third in the points classification, wore the green jersey, because first placed Jasper Philipsen wore the yellow jersey as the leader of the general classification and second place Biniam Girmay wore the white jersey as leader of the young rider classification.)	Benjamin Thomas	Biniam Girmay	Tudor Pro Cycling Team	Mattéo Vercher
2	Mathieu van der Poel	Mathieu van der Poel	Jasper Philipsen	Tadej Pogačar	Kévin Vauquelin	Groupama–FDJ	Bruno Armirail
3	Tim Merlier	Mathieu van der Poel	Jonathan Milan	Tim Wellens	Kévin Vauquelin	Groupama–FDJ	not awarded (Note: On stage 3, it was originally planned to present the combativity award, but after there were no significant attempts to form a breakaway group, it was decided not to present the award.)
4	Tadej Pogačar	Mathieu van der Poel	Jonathan Milan	Tadej Pogačar (Note: On stage 6, Jonas Vingegaard, who was third in the mountains classification, wore the polkadot jersey, because first placed Tadej Pogačar wore the yellow jersey as the leader of the general classification and second placed Tim Wellens was obligated to wear the Belgian national champion's jersey.)	Kévin Vauquelin	Visma–Lease a Bike	Lenny Martinez
5	Remco Evenepoel	Tadej Pogačar	Tadej Pogačar (Note: On stages 6 and 8, Jonathan Milan, who was second in the points classification, wore the green jersey, because first placed Tadej Pogačar wore the yellow jersey as the leader of the general classification.)	Tadej Pogačar	Remco Evenepoel	Visma–Lease a Bike	no award
6	Ben Healy	Mathieu van der Poel	Jonathan Milan	Tim Wellens	Remco Evenepoel	Visma–Lease a Bike	Ben Healy
7	Tadej Pogačar	Tadej Pogačar	Tadej Pogačar	Tim Wellens	Remco Evenepoel	Visma–Lease a Bike	Ewen Costiou
8	Jonathan Milan	Tadej Pogačar	Jonathan Milan	Tim Wellens	Remco Evenepoel	Visma–Lease a Bike	Mathieu Burgaudeau & Mattéo Vercher
9	Tim Merlier	Tadej Pogačar	Jonathan Milan	Tim Wellens	Remco Evenepoel	Visma–Lease a Bike	Jonas Rickaert
10	Simon Yates	Ben Healy	Jonathan Milan	Lenny Martinez	Ben Healy (Note: On stages 11 and 12, Remco Evenepoel, who was second in the youth classification, wore the white jersey, because first placed Ben Healy wore the yellow jersey as the leader of the general classification.)	Visma–Lease a Bike	Ben Healy
11	Jonas Abrahamsen	Ben Healy	Jonathan Milan	Lenny Martinez	Ben Healy	Visma–Lease a Bike	Jonas Abrahamsen
12	Tadej Pogačar	Tadej Pogačar	Jonathan Milan	Tadej Pogačar (Note: On stages 13–14 and 17–18 Lenny Martinez, who was second in the mountains classification, wore the polkadot jersey, because first placed Tadej Pogačar wore the yellow jersey as the leader of the general classification.)	Remco Evenepoel	Visma–Lease a Bike	Bruno Armirail
13	Tadej Pogačar	Tadej Pogačar	Jonathan Milan	Tadej Pogačar	Remco Evenepoel	Visma–Lease a Bike	no award
14	Thymen Arensman	Tadej Pogačar	Jonathan Milan	Lenny Martinez	Florian Lipowitz	Visma–Lease a Bike	Lenny Martinez
15	Tim Wellens	Tadej Pogačar	Jonathan Milan	Lenny Martinez	Florian Lipowitz	Visma–Lease a Bike	Michael Storer
16	Valentin Paret-Peintre	Tadej Pogačar	Jonathan Milan	Tadej Pogačar (Note: On stages 19–21, Jonas Vingegaard, who was second in the mountains classification, wore the polkadot jersey, because first placed Tadej Pogačar wore the yellow jersey as the leader of the general classification.)	Florian Lipowitz	Visma–Lease a Bike	Ben Healy
17	Jonathan Milan	Tadej Pogačar	Jonathan Milan	Tadej Pogačar	Florian Lipowitz	Visma–Lease a Bike	Quentin Pacher
18	Ben O'Connor	Tadej Pogačar	Jonathan Milan	Tadej Pogačar	Florian Lipowitz	Visma–Lease a Bike	Ben O'Connor
19	Thymen Arensman	Tadej Pogačar	Jonathan Milan	Tadej Pogačar	Florian Lipowitz	Visma–Lease a Bike	Thymen Arensman
20	Kaden Groves	Tadej Pogačar	Jonathan Milan	Tadej Pogačar	Florian Lipowitz	Visma–Lease a Bike	Harry Sweeny
21	Wout van Aert	Tadej Pogačar	Jonathan Milan	Tadej Pogačar	Florian Lipowitz	Visma–Lease a Bike	no award
Final		Tadej Pogačar	Jonathan Milan	Tadej Pogačar	Florian Lipowitz	Visma–Lease a Bike	Ben Healy

== Classification standings ==
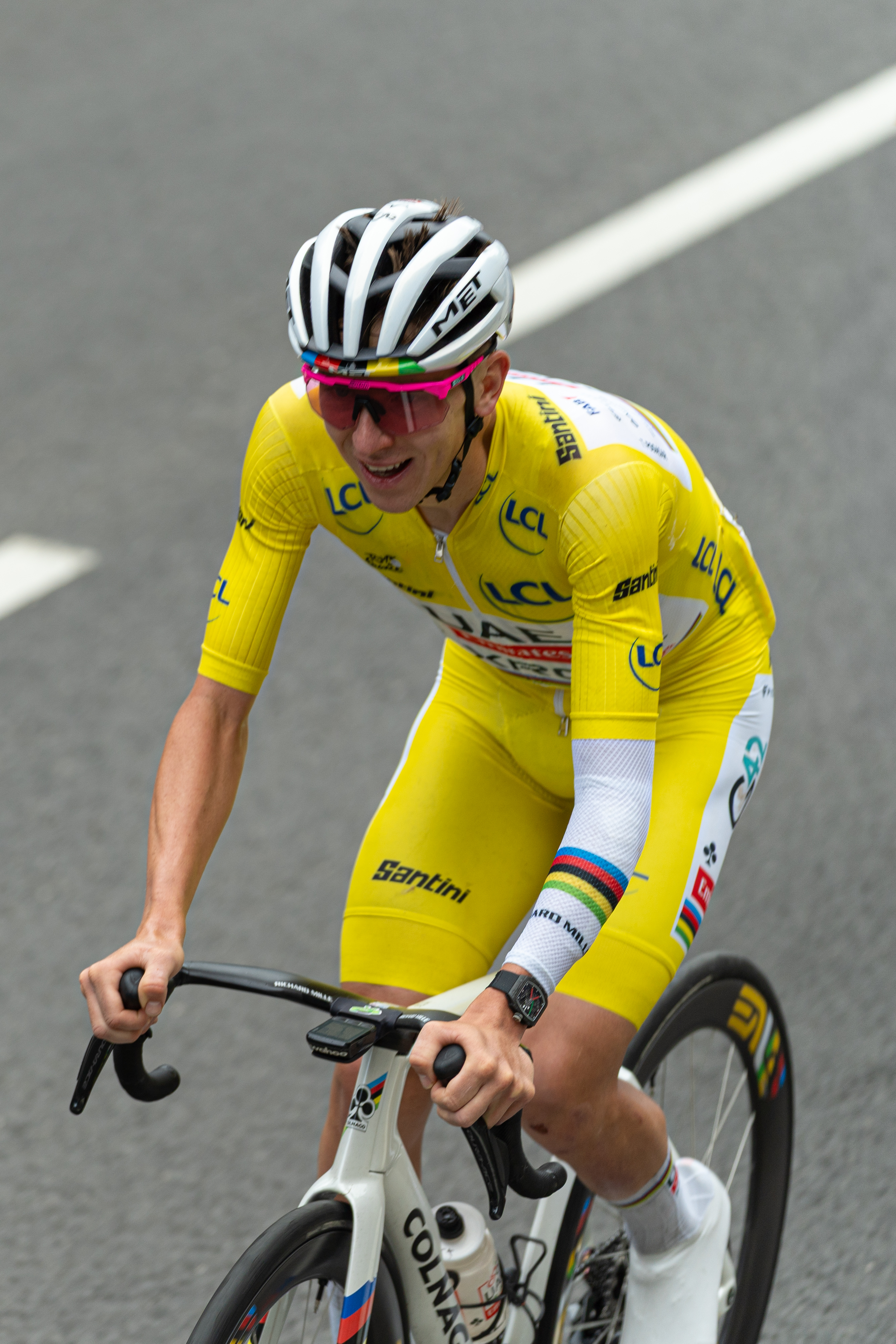
Tadej Pogačar, winner of the general classification and the mountains classification, wearing the yellow jersey

Legend
Denotes the winner of the general classification	Denotes the winner of the mountains classification
Denotes the winner of the points classification	Denotes the winner of the young rider classification
Denotes the winner of the team classification	Denotes the winner of the combativity award

=== General classification ===
Final general classification (1–10)
Rank	Rider	Team	Time
1	Tadej Pogačar (SLO)	UAE Team Emirates XRG	76h 00' 32"
2	Jonas Vingegaard (DEN)	Visma–Lease a Bike	+ 4' 24"
3	Florian Lipowitz (GER)	Red Bull–Bora–Hansgrohe	+ 11' 00"
4	Oscar Onley (GBR)	Team Picnic–PostNL	+ 12' 12"
5	Felix Gall (AUT)	Decathlon–AG2R La Mondiale	+ 17' 12"
6	Tobias Halland Johannessen (NOR)	Uno-X Mobility	+ 20' 14"
7	Kévin Vauquelin (FRA)	Arkéa–B&B Hotels	+ 22' 35"
8	Primož Roglič (SLO)	Red Bull–Bora–Hansgrohe	+ 25' 30"
9	Ben Healy (IRL)	EF Education–EasyPost	+ 28' 02"
10	Jordan Jegat (FRA)	Team TotalEnergies	+ 32' 42"

Final general classification (11–160)
Rank	Rider	Team	Time
11	Ben O'Connor (AUS)	Team Jayco–AlUla	+ 34' 34"
12	Thymen Arensman (NED)	INEOS Grenadiers	+ 52' 41"
13	Jhonatan Narváez (ECU)	UAE Team Emirates XRG	+ 1h 04' 36"
14	Sergio Higuita (COL)	XDS Astana Team	+ 1h 08' 19"
15	Simon Yates (GBR)	Visma–Lease a Bike	+ 1h 17' 30"
16	Guillaume Martin (FRA)	Groupama–FDJ	+ 1h 18' 07"
17	Sepp Kuss (USA)	Visma–Lease a Bike	+ 1h 20' 24"
18	Gregor Mühlberger (AUT)	Movistar Team	+ 1h 28' 17"
19	Matteo Jorgenson (USA)	Visma–Lease a Bike	+ 1h 29' 28"
20	Cristián Rodríguez (ESP)	Arkéa–B&B Hotels	+ 1h 36' 15"
21	Valentin Madouas (FRA)	Groupama–FDJ	+ 1h 39' 46"
22	Xandro Meurisse (BEL)	Alpecin–Deceuninck	+ 1h 43' 46"
23	Warren Barguil (FRA)	Team Picnic–PostNL	+ 1h 48' 09"
24	Adam Yates (GBR)	UAE Team Emirates XRG	+ 1h 48' 41"
25	Aurélien Paret-Peintre (FRA)	Decathlon–AG2R La Mondiale	+ 2h 12' 52"
26	Raúl García Pierna (ESP)	Arkéa–B&B Hotels	+ 2h 15' 58"
27	Aleksandr Vlasov	Red Bull–Bora–Hansgrohe	+ 2h 16' 15"
28	Victor Campenaerts (BEL)	Visma–Lease a Bike	+ 2h 20' 36"
29	Marc Soler (ESP)	UAE Team Emirates XRG	+ 2h 21' 01"
30	Emanuel Buchmann (GER)	Cofidis	+ 2h 21' 34"
31	Einer Rubio (COL)	Movistar Team	+ 2h 21' 56"
32	Ilan Van Wilder (BEL)	Soudal–Quick-Step	+ 2h 23' 14"
33	Callum Scotson (AUS)	Decathlon–AG2R La Mondiale	+ 2h 25' 40"
34	Romain Grégoire (FRA)	Groupama–FDJ	+ 2h 25' 58"
35	Harry Sweeny (AUS)	EF Education–EasyPost	+ 2h 27' 58"
36	Clément Berthet (FRA)	Decathlon–AG2R La Mondiale	+ 2h 32' 50"
37	Tim Wellens (BEL)	UAE Team Emirates XRG	+ 2h 38' 24"
38	Simone Velasco (ITA)	XDS Astana Team	+ 2h 41' 31"
39	Frank van den Broek (NED)	Team Picnic–PostNL	+ 2h 45' 44"
40	Santiago Buitrago (COL)	Team Bahrain Victorious	+ 2h 45' 48"
41	Valentin Paret-Peintre (FRA)	Soudal–Quick-Step	+ 2h 47' 05"
42	Michael Storer (AUS)	Tudor Pro Cycling Team	+ 2h 50' 51"
43	Clément Venturini (FRA)	Arkéa–B&B Hotels	+ 2h 52' 39"
44	Harold Tejada (COL)	XDS Astana Team	+ 2h 54' 34"
45	Quentin Pacher (FRA)	Groupama–FDJ	+ 2h 56' 00"
46	Alex Baudin (FRA)	EF Education–EasyPost	+ 2h 56' 15"
47	Neilson Powless (USA)	EF Education–EasyPost	+ 2h 58' 52"
48	Joseph Blackmore (GBR)	Israel–Premier Tech	+ 2h 59' 04"
49	Pascal Eenkhoorn (NED)	Soudal–Quick-Step	+ 3h 00' 25"
50	Bruno Armirail (FRA)	Decathlon–AG2R La Mondiale	+ 3h 03' 12"
51	Ewen Costiou (FRA)	Arkéa–B&B Hotels	+ 3h 06' 35"
52	Michael Woods (CAN)	Israel–Premier Tech	+ 3h 06' 59"
53	Axel Laurance (FRA)	INEOS Grenadiers	+ 3h 10' 10"
54	Tiesj Benoot (BEL)	Visma–Lease a Bike	+ 3h 10' 19"
55	Alexandre Delettre (FRA)	Team TotalEnergies	+ 3h 12' 28"
56	Julian Alaphilippe (FRA)	Tudor Pro Cycling Team	+ 3h 13' 20"
57	Andreas Leknessund (NOR)	Uno-X Mobility	+ 3h 14' 44"
58	Geraint Thomas (GBR)	INEOS Grenadiers	+ 3h 14' 57"
59	Quinn Simmons (USA)	Lidl–Trek	+ 3h 17' 36"
60	Thomas Gachignard (FRA)	Team TotalEnergies	+ 3h 23' 14"
61	Mathis Le Berre (FRA)	Arkéa–B&B Hotels	+ 3h 25' 28"
62	Jasper Stuyven (BEL)	Lidl–Trek	+ 3h 26' 11"
63	Mathieu Burgaudeau (FRA)	Team TotalEnergies	+ 3h 26' 18"
64	Markus Hoelgaard (NOR)	Uno-X Mobility	+ 3h 26' 29"
65	Emiel Verstrynge (BEL)	Alpecin–Deceuninck	+ 3h 28' 01"
66	Jenno Berckmoes (BEL)	Lotto	+ 3h 33' 12"
67	Wout van Aert (BEL)	Visma–Lease a Bike	+ 3h 33' 56"
68	Maximilian Schachmann (GER)	Soudal–Quick-Step	+ 3h 35' 01"
69	Ion Izagirre (ESP)	Cofidis	+ 3h 35' 02"
70	Tobias Foss (NOR)	INEOS Grenadiers	+ 3h 35' 15"
71	Jonas Abrahamsen (NOR)	Uno-X Mobility	+ 3h 36' 21"
72	Michael Valgren (DEN)	EF Education–EasyPost	+ 3h 37' 01"
73	Oliver Naesen (BEL)	Decathlon–AG2R La Mondiale	+ 3h 39' 28"
74	Nelson Oliveira (POR)	Movistar Team	+ 3h 41' 03"
75	Nils Politt (GER)	UAE Team Emirates XRG	+ 3h 44' 45"
76	Anders Halland Johannessen (NOR)	Uno-X Mobility	+ 3h 46' 02"
77	Bastien Tronchon (FRA)	Decathlon–AG2R La Mondiale	+ 3h 46' 36"
78	Marc Hirschi (SUI)	Tudor Pro Cycling Team	+ 3h 48' 37"
79	Lenny Martinez (FRA)	Team Bahrain Victorious	+ 3h 49' 05"
80	Mike Teunissen (NED)	XDS Astana Team	+ 3h 49' 28"
81	Alex Aranburu (ESP)	Cofidis	+ 3h 49' 29"
82	Louis Barré (FRA)	Intermarché–Wanty	+ 3h 51' 34"
83	Marius Mayrhofer (GER)	Tudor Pro Cycling Team	+ 3h 53' 18"
84	Brent Van Moer (BEL)	Lotto	+ 3h 53' 19"
85	Clément Champoussin (FRA)	XDS Astana Team	+ 3h 53' 27"
86	Kaden Groves (AUS)	Alpecin–Deceuninck	+ 3h 53' 29"
87	Pavel Sivakov (FRA)	UAE Team Emirates XRG	+ 3h 54' 19"
88	Krists Neilands (LAT)	Israel–Premier Tech	+ 3h 54' 25"
89	Laurence Pithie (NZL)	Red Bull–Bora–Hansgrohe	+ 3h 54' 44"
90	Dylan Teuns (BEL)	Cofidis	+ 3h 55' 48"
91	Kasper Asgreen (DEN)	EF Education–EasyPost	+ 3h 58' 25"
92	Alexey Lutsenko (KAZ)	Israel–Premier Tech	+ 3h 59' 52"
93	Clément Russo (FRA)	Groupama–FDJ	+ 4h 01' 44"
94	Damien Touzé (FRA)	Cofidis	+ 4h 01' 48"
95	Toms Skujiņš (LAT)	Lidl–Trek	+ 4h 04' 16"
96	Tobias Lund Andresen (DEN)	Team Picnic–PostNL	+ 4h 06' 51"
97	Marco Haller (AUT)	Tudor Pro Cycling Team	+ 4h 09' 24"
98	Jonas Rickaert (BEL)	Alpecin–Deceuninck	+ 4h 11' 17"
99	Matteo Trentin (ITA)	Tudor Pro Cycling Team	+ 4h 12' 31"
100	Matis Louvel (FRA)	Israel–Premier Tech	+ 4h 13' 01"
101	Mauro Schmid (SUI)	Team Jayco–AlUla	+ 4h 14' 00"
102	Will Barta (USA)	Movistar Team	+ 4h 20' 07"
103	Gianni Vermeersch (BEL)	Alpecin–Deceuninck	+ 4h 22' 29"
104	Fred Wright (GBR)	Team Bahrain Victorious	+ 4h 22' 52"
105	Gianni Moscon (ITA)	Red Bull–Bora–Hansgrohe	+ 4h 30' 56"
106	Anthony Turgis (FRA)	Team TotalEnergies	+ 4h 31' 58"
107	Iván Romeo (ESP)	Movistar Team	+ 4h 33' 49"
108	Jake Stewart (GBR)	Israel–Premier Tech	+ 4h 36' 37"
109	Connor Swift (GBR)	INEOS Grenadiers	+ 4h 40' 30"
110	Pablo Castrillo (ESP)	Movistar Team	+ 4h 42' 51"
111	Paul Penhoët (FRA)	Groupama–FDJ	+ 4h 44' 44"
112	Niklas Märkl (GER)	Team Picnic–PostNL	+ 4h 46' 23"
113	Mick van Dijke (NED)	Red Bull–Bora–Hansgrohe	+ 4h 46' 50"
114	Vincenzo Albanese (ITA)	EF Education–EasyPost	+ 4h 48' 20"
115	Samuel Watson (GBR)	INEOS Grenadiers	+ 4h 50' 14"
116	Thibau Nys (BEL)	Lidl–Trek	+ 4h 50' 42"
117	Iván García Cortina (ESP)	Movistar Team	+ 4h 53' 18"
118	Edoardo Affini (ITA)	Visma–Lease a Bike	+ 4h 54' 53"
119	Alberto Dainese (ITA)	Tudor Pro Cycling Team	+ 4h 56' 31"
120	Tim Naberman (NED)	Team Picnic–PostNL	+ 5h 00' 03"
121	Luke Plapp (AUS)	Team Jayco–AlUla	+ 5h 02' 34"
122	Eduardo Sepúlveda (ARG)	Lotto	+ 5h 02' 54"
123	Robert Stannard (AUS)	Team Bahrain Victorious	+ 5h 03' 30"
124	Mattéo Vercher (FRA)	Team TotalEnergies	+ 5h 06' 33"
125	Pascal Ackermann (GER)	Israel–Premier Tech	+ 5h 09' 57"
126	Matej Mohorič (SLO)	Team Bahrain Victorious	+ 5h 10' 13"
127	Lewis Askey (GBR)	Groupama–FDJ	+ 5h 10' 40"
128	Jonas Rutsch (GER)	Intermarché–Wanty	+ 5h 11' 07"
129	Jarrad Drizners (AUS)	Lotto	+ 5h 11' 17"
130	Magnus Cort (DEN)	Uno-X Mobility	+ 5h 11' 51"
131	Silvan Dillier (SUI)	Alpecin–Deceuninck	+ 5h 14' 12"
132	Biniam Girmay (ERI)	Intermarché–Wanty	+ 5h 14' 55"
133	Pavel Bittner (CZE)	Team Picnic–PostNL	+ 5h 17' 44"
134	Sean Flynn (GBR)	Team Picnic–PostNL	+ 5h 18' 13"
135	Davide Ballerini (ITA)	XDS Astana Team	+ 5h 20' 22"
136	Amaury Capiot (BEL)	Arkéa–B&B Hotels	+ 5h 22' 38"
137	Luke Durbridge (AUS)	Team Jayco–AlUla	+ 5h 23' 21"
138	Hugo Page (FRA)	Intermarché–Wanty	+ 5h 24' 23"
139	Stian Fredheim (NOR)	Uno-X Mobility	+ 5h 26' 41"
140	Elmar Reinders (NED)	Team Jayco–AlUla	+ 5h 28' 50"
141	Laurenz Rex (BEL)	Intermarché–Wanty	+ 5h 29' 16"
142	Arnaud De Lie (BEL)	Lotto	+ 5h 29' 35"
143	Vito Braet (BEL)	Intermarché–Wanty	+ 5h 32' 04"
144	Sébastien Grignard (BEL)	Lotto	+ 5h 33' 48"
145	Alexis Renard (FRA)	Cofidis	+ 5h 34' 56"
146	Jonathan Milan (ITA)	Lidl–Trek	+ 5h 35' 35"
147	Bert Van Lerberghe (BEL)	Soudal–Quick-Step	+ 5h 36' 47"
148	Tim Merlier (BEL)	Soudal–Quick-Step	+ 5h 37' 19"
149	Guillaume Boivin (CAN)	Israel–Premier Tech	+ 5h 37' 44"
150	Dylan Groenewegen (NED)	Team Jayco–AlUla	+ 5h 38' 24"
151	Phil Bauhaus (GER)	Team Bahrain Victorious	+ 5h 39' 29"
152	Luka Mezgec (SLO)	Team Jayco–AlUla	+ 5h 40' 08"
153	Arnaud Démare (FRA)	Arkéa–B&B Hotels	+ 5h 40' 35"
154	Benjamin Thomas (FRA)	Cofidis	+ 5h 41' 16"
155	Kamil Gradek (POL)	Team Bahrain Victorious	+ 5h 43' 51"
156	Roel van Sintmaartensdijk (NED)	Intermarché–Wanty	+ 5h 44' 11"
157	Fabian Lienhard (SUI)	Tudor Pro Cycling Team	+ 5h 46' 00"
158	Jordi Meeus (BEL)	Red Bull–Bora–Hansgrohe	+ 5h 48' 25"
159	Edward Theuns (BEL)	Lidl–Trek	+ 5h 51' 25"
160	Simone Consonni (ITA)	Lidl–Trek	+ 5h 51' 40"

=== Points classification ===
Final points classification (1–10)
Rank	Rider	Team	Points
1	Jonathan Milan (ITA)	Lidl–Trek	372
2	Tadej Pogačar (SLO)	UAE Team Emirates XRG	294
3	Biniam Girmay (ERI)	Intermarché–Wanty	232
4	Jonas Vingegaard (DEN)	Visma–Lease a Bike	182
5	Anthony Turgis (FRA)	Team TotalEnergies	182
6	Jonas Abrahamsen (NOR)	Uno-X Mobility	173
7	Tim Merlier (BEL)	Soudal–Quick-Step	156
8	Wout van Aert (BEL)	Visma–Lease a Bike	138
9	Kaden Groves (AUS)	Alpecin–Deceuninck	125
10	Quinn Simmons (USA)	Lidl–Trek	123

=== Mountains classification ===
Final mountains classification (1–10)
Rank	Rider	Team	Points
1	Tadej Pogačar (SLO)	UAE Team Emirates XRG	119
2	Jonas Vingegaard (DEN)	Visma–Lease a Bike	104
3	Lenny Martinez (FRA)	Team Bahrain Victorious	97
4	Thymen Arensman (NED)	INEOS Grenadiers	85
5	Ben O'Connor (AUS)	Team Jayco–AlUla	51
6	Valentin Paret-Peintre (FRA)	Soudal–Quick-Step	51
7	Felix Gall (AUT)	Decathlon–AG2R La Mondiale	46
8	Primož Roglič (SLO)	Red Bull–Bora–Hansgrohe	43
9	Oscar Onley (GBR)	Team Picnic–PostNL	42
10	Michael Woods (CAN)	Israel–Premier Tech	38

=== Young rider classification ===
Final young rider classification (1–10)
Rank	Rider	Team	Time
1	Florian Lipowitz (GER)	Red Bull–Bora–Hansgrohe	76h 11' 32"
2	Oscar Onley (GBR)	Team Picnic–PostNL	+ 1' 12"
3	Kévin Vauquelin (FRA)	Arkéa–B&B Hotels	+ 11' 35"
4	Ben Healy (IRL)	EF Education–EasyPost	+ 17' 02"
5	Raúl García Pierna (ESP)	Arkéa–B&B Hotels	+ 2h 04' 58"
6	Ilan Van Wilder (BEL)	Soudal–Quick-Step	+ 2h 12' 14"
7	Romain Grégoire (FRA)	Groupama–FDJ	+ 2h 14' 58"
8	Frank van den Broek (NED)	Team Picnic–PostNL	+ 2h 34' 44"
9	Valentin Paret-Peintre (FRA)	Soudal–Quick-Step	+ 2h 36' 05"
10	Alex Baudin (FRA)	EF Education–EasyPost	+ 2h 45' 15"

=== Team classification ===
Final team classification (1–10)
Rank	Team	Time
1	(Netherlands) Visma–Lease a Bike	232h 01' 32"
2	(United Arab Emirates) UAE Team Emirates XRG	+ 24' 26"
3	(Germany) Red Bull–Bora–Hansgrohe	+ 1h 24' 47"
4	(France) Arkéa–B&B Hotels	+ 2h 10' 52"
5	(France) Decathlon–AG2R La Mondiale	+ 2h 14' 15"
6	(United Kingdom) INEOS Grenadiers	+ 3h 22' 52"
7	(Spain) Movistar Team	+ 3h 23' 25"
8	(Kazakhstan) XDS Astana Team	+ 3h 23' 59"
9	(Netherlands) Team Picnic–PostNL	+ 3h 26' 06"
10	(United States) EF Education–EasyPost	+ 3h 43' 35"

== Broadcasting ==
As with previous editions, live television coverage was provided by France Télévisions in conjunction with the European Broadcasting Union. Media reported that an average of 3.8 million people in France watched the Tour each day, a 9% increase on 2024. The most watched stage was stage 10 on Bastille Day, with 5.4 million viewers in France, an audience share of 49.8%. A peak of 8.7 million viewers watched the final stage in Paris, the highest French viewing figures for the Tour in 20 years.
