= 2023 GP Industria & Artigianato di Larciano =

- 2023 UCI ProSeries

Race details
- Dates: 26 March 2023
- Stages: 1
- Distance: 199.8 km (124.1 mi)
- Winning time: 4h 33' 09"

Results
	Winner	Ben Healy (IRL)	(EF Education–EasyPost)
	Second	Amanuel Ghebreigzabhier (ERI)	(Trek–Segafredo)
	Third	Mark Stewart (GBR)	(Bolton Equities Black Spoke)

The 2023 GP Industria & Artigianato di Larciano (transl. GP Industry & Handicraft of Larciano) was the 54th edition of the GP Industria & Artigianato di Larciano road cycling one-day race that was held on 26 March 2023. It was held as a 1.Pro event on the 2023 UCI ProSeries.

== Teams ==
Four UCI WorldTeams, six UCI ProTeams and eight UCI Continental teams made up the eighteen teams that participated in the race. Of these teams, 12 entered a full squad of seven riders. Four teams (Astana Qazaqstan Team, EF Education–EasyPost, Eolo–Kometa and UAE Team Emirates) each entered six riders and two teams (Team Colpack–Ballan–CSB and Trek–Segafredo) each entered five riders. Of the 117 riders in the race, there were only 46 finishers.

UCI WorldTeams

- Astana Qazaqstan Team
- EF Education–EasyPost
- Trek–Segafredo
- UAE Team Emirates

UCI ProTeams

- Green Project–Bardiani–CSF–Faizanè
- Bingoal WB
- Bolton Equities Black Spoke
- Eolo–Kometa
- Q36.5 Pro Cycling Team
- Team Corratec

UCI Continental Teams

- Beltrami TSA–Tre Colli
- Biesse–Carrera
- General Store–Essegibi–Fratelli Curia
- MG.K Vis Colors for Peace VPM
- Team Colpack–Ballan
- Team Novo Nordisk
- Team Technipes #inEmiliaRomagna
- Work Service–Vitalcare–Vega

== Result ==
Result
Rank	Rider	Team	Time
1	Ben Healy (IRL)	EF Education–EasyPost	4h 33' 09"
2	Amanuel Ghebreigzabhier (ERI)	Trek–Segafredo	+ 27"
3	Mark Stewart (GBR)	Bolton Equities Black Spoke	+ 47"
4	Natnael Tesfatsion (ERI)	Trek–Segafredo	+ 47"
5	Diego Ulissi (ITA)	UAE Team Emirates	+ 47"
6	Felix Großschartner (AUT)	UAE Team Emirates	+ 47"
7	Marco Tizza (ITA)	Bingoal WB	+ 47"
8	Tony Gallopin (FRA)	Trek–Segafredo	+ 47"
9	Christian Scaroni (ITA)	Astana Qazaqstan Team	+ 47"
10	Georg Steinhauser (GER)	EF Education–EasyPost	+ 47"
