= 2023 Amstel Gold Race =

Cycling race

2023 UCI World Tour, race 17 of 35

Race details
- Dates: 16 April 2023
- Stages: 1
- Distance: 253.6 km (157.6 mi)
- Winning time: 6h 02' 02"

Results
	Winner	Tadej Pogačar (SLO)	(UAE Team Emirates)
	Second	Ben Healy (IRL)	(EF Education–EasyPost)
	Third	Thomas Pidcock (GBR)	(Ineos Grenadiers)

The 2023 Amstel Gold Race was a road cycling one-day race that took place on 16 April 2023 in the Netherlands. It was the 57th edition of the Amstel Gold Race and the 17th event of the 2023 UCI World Tour.

The race was won by Slovenian rider Tadej Pogačar of UAE Team Emirates after a solo attack.

== Teams ==
Twenty-five teams participated in the race, including all eighteen UCI WorldTeams and seven UCI ProTeams.

UCI WorldTeams

- AG2R Citroën Team
- Alpecin–Deceuninck
- Arkéa–Samsic
- Astana Qazaqstan Team
- Bora–Hansgrohe
- Cofidis
- EF Education–EasyPost
- Groupama–FDJ
- Ineos Grenadiers
- Intermarché–Circus–Wanty
- Movistar Team
- Soudal–Quick-Step
- Team Bahrain Victorious
- Team DSM
- Team Jayco–AlUla
- Team Jumbo–Visma
- Trek–Segafredo
- UAE Team Emirates

UCI ProTeams

- Israel–Premier Tech
- Lotto–Dstny
- Q36.5 Pro Cycling Team
- Team Flanders–Baloise
- Team TotalEnergies
- Tudor Pro Cycling Team
- Uno-X Pro Cycling Team

== Result ==
Result
Rank	Rider	Team	Time
1	Tadej Pogačar (SLO)	UAE Team Emirates	6h 02' 02"
2	Ben Healy (IRL)	EF Education–EasyPost	+ 38"
3	Tom Pidcock (GBR)	Ineos Grenadiers	+ 2' 14"
4	Andreas Kron (DEN)	Lotto–Dstny	+ 2' 14"
5	Alexey Lutsenko (KAZ)	Astana Qazaqstan Team	+ 2' 14"
6	Andrea Bagioli (ITA)	Soudal–Quick-Step	+ 3' 14"
7	Maxim Van Gils (BEL)	Lotto–Dstny	+ 3' 14"
8	Mattias Skjelmose Jensen (DEN)	Trek–Segafredo	+ 3' 14"
9	Alexander Kamp (DEN)	Tudor Pro Cycling Team	+ 3' 14"
10	Axel Zingle (FRA)	Cofidis	+ 3' 14"
