= 2025 Amstel Gold Race =

Cycling race

2025 UCI World Tour, race 17 of 36

Race details
- Dates: 20 April 2025
- Stages: 1
- Distance: 255.9 km (159.0 mi)
- Winning time: 5h 49' 58"

Results
	Winner	Mattias Skjelmose (DEN)	(Lidl–Trek)
	Second	Tadej Pogačar (SLO)	(UAE Team Emirates XRG)
	Third	Remco Evenepoel (BEL)	(Soudal–Quick-Step)

The 2025 Amstel Gold Race was a road cycling one-day race that took place on 20 April in the Netherlands. It was the 59th edition of the Amstel Gold Race and the 17th event of the 2025 UCI World Tour.

The race was won by Danish rider Mattias Skjelmose of Lidl–Trek, who out-sprinted Tadej Pogačar and Remco Evenepoel to take what multiple cycling journalists called the biggest victory of his career.

== Pre-race favorites ==
The Amstel Gold Race marks the beginning of the Ardennes classics, which typically favor puncheur riders who excel on short steep climbs. Tadej Pogačar was seen as the top favorite for the 2025 edition, having won the race in 2023 and having shown strong form by winning the 2025 Tour of Flanders. The other top contenders were Tom Pidcock, the reigning champion from 2024, and Remco Evenepoel, who was racing the Amstel Gold Race for the first time but had won other hilly classics like Liège–Bastogne–Liège in previous years. Other riders mentioned in pre-race analysis were Wout van Aert, Michael Matthews, Ben Healy, Romain Grégoire, Tiesj Benoot, Neilson Powless, Thibau Nys, Maxim Van Gils and Alex Aranburu.

== Teams ==
All eighteen UCI WorldTeams and seven UCI ProTeams participated in the race.

UCI WorldTeams

- Alpecin–Deceuninck
- Arkéa–B&B Hotels
- Cofidis
- Decathlon–AG2R La Mondiale
- EF Education–EasyPost
- Groupama–FDJ
- Ineos Grenadiers
- Intermarché–Wanty
- Lidl–Trek
- Movistar Team
- Red Bull–Bora–Hansgrohe
- Soudal–Quick-Step
- Team Bahrain Victorious
- Team Jayco–AlUla
- Team Picnic–PostNL
- UAE Team Emirates XRG
- Visma–Lease a Bike
- XDS Astana Team

UCI ProTeams

- Israel–Premier Tech
- Lotto
- Q36.5 Pro Cycling Team
- Team TotalEnergies
- Tudor Pro Cycling Team
- Unibet Tietema Rockets
- Uno-X Mobility

== Race summary ==
The 2025 race course was 255.9 kilometres (159.0 mi) and featured 34 climbs. An eight-rider breakaway went in the opening 40 km (25 mi), and gained a gap of over four minutes from the main peloton. The gap was slowly reduced over the next 100 km (62 mi), with the final member of the breakaway being caught with 69 km remaining.

The first major action from a top contender came with 47 km (29 mi) to go when Julian Alaphilippe attacked off the front, only followed by Tadej Pogačar. The pair built a 13 second gap before Pogačar dropped Alaphilippe to go solo. Remco Evenepoel attacked multiple times from the peloton, eventually forming a chase group with Mattias Skjelmose. With 8 km to the finish, Evenepoel and Skjelmose caught Pogačar, forming a group of three with a single climb remaining. Evenepoel started the sprint, with Pogačar coming around him before Skjelmose accelerated and beat Pogačar on the line in a photo finish.

The result was widely seen as an upset, with CyclingNews calling Skjelmose's sprint "a true David and Goliath performance". Skjelmose himself admitted after the race that he didn't believe he could win, and was only riding for a podium place, saying "I really didn't believe it" when he crossed the line ahead of Pogačar.

== Result ==
Result
Rank	Rider	Team	Time
1	Mattias Skjelmose (DEN)	Lidl–Trek	5h 49' 58"
2	Tadej Pogačar (SLO)	UAE Team Emirates XRG	+ 0"
3	Remco Evenepoel (BEL)	Soudal–Quick-Step	+ 0"
4	Wout van Aert (BEL)	Visma–Lease a Bike	+ 34"
5	Michael Matthews (AUS)	Team Jayco–AlUla	+ 34"
6	Louis Barré (FRA)	Intermarché–Wanty	+ 34"
7	Romain Grégoire (FRA)	Groupama–FDJ	+ 34"
8	Tiesj Benoot (BEL)	Visma–Lease a Bike	+ 34"
9	Tom Pidcock (GBR)	Q36.5 Pro Cycling Team	+ 34"
10	Ben Healy (IRL)	EF Education–EasyPost	+ 34"
