= Klanec =

Klanec is a Slovene place name that may refer to:

- Klanec, Komenda, a village in the Municipality of Komenda, northern Slovenia
- Klanec pri Gabrovki, a village in the Municipality of Litija, southeastern Slovenia
- Klanec pri Komnu, a village in the Municipality of Komen, southwestern Slovenia
- Klanec pri Kozini, a village in the Municipality of Hrpelje–Kozina, southwestern Slovenia
