= Tadej Pogačar =

Slovenian cyclist (born 1998)

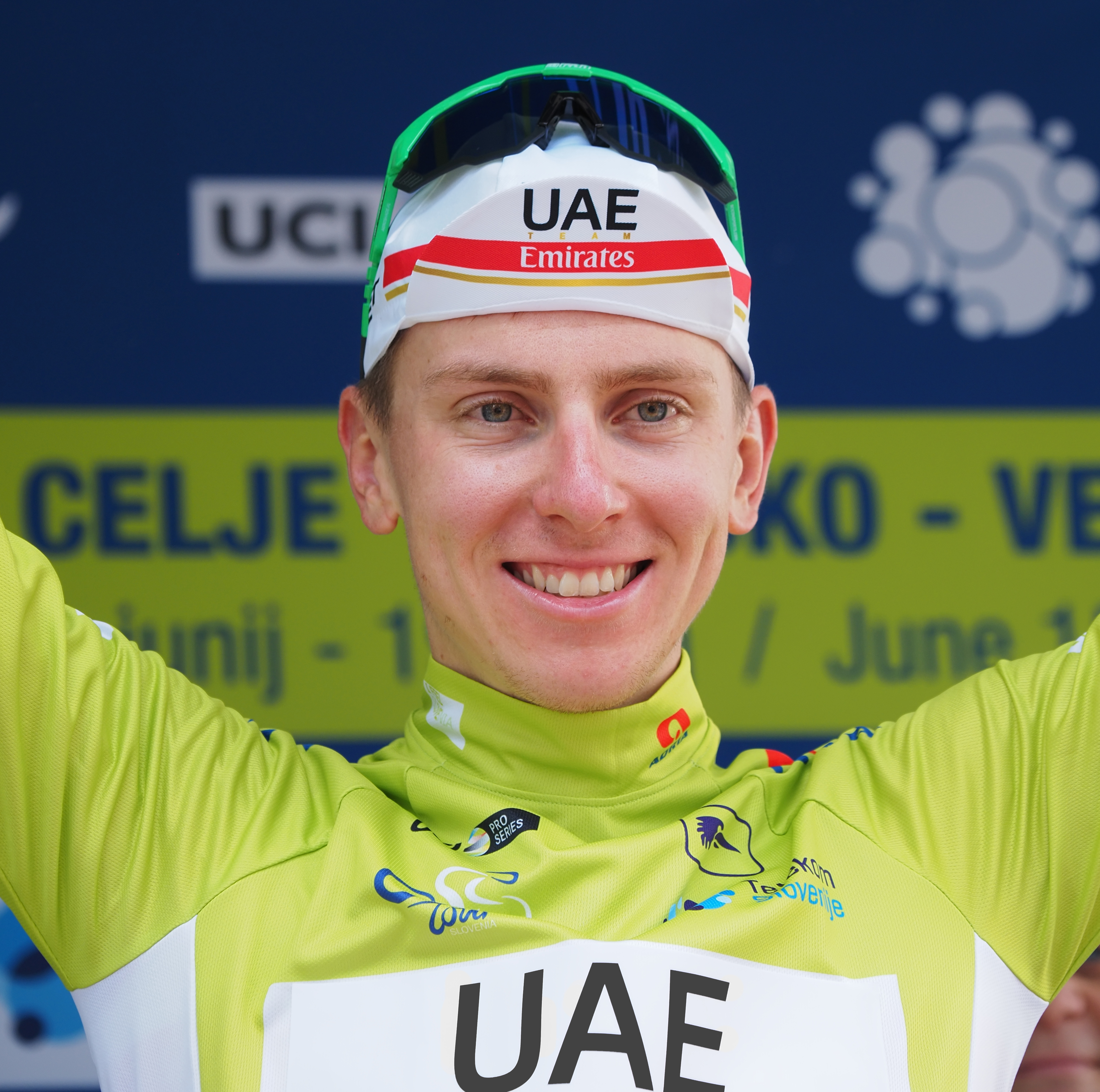
- Pogačar at the 2022 Tour of Slovenia (current UCI world No.1 – record 279 weeks in total)

Personal information
- Nickname: Pogi
- Born: 21 September 1998 (age 28) Klanec, Slovenia
- Height: 1.76 m (5 ft 9 1/2 in)
- Weight: 66 kg (146 lb; 10 st 6 lb)

Cycling career
- Sport: Cycling
- Current team: UAE Team Emirates XRG
- Discipline: Road
- Role: Rider
- Rider type: All-rounder

Professional teams
- 2017–2018: Rog–Ljubljana
- 2019–: UAE Team Emirates

Major wins
- Grand Tours Tour de France General classification (2020, 2021, 2024, 2025, 2026) Mountains classification (2020, 2021, 2025) Young rider classification (2020, 2021, 2022, 2023) 26 individual stages (2020–2026) Giro d'Italia General classification (2024) Mountains classification (2024) 6 individual stages (2024) Vuelta a España Young rider classification (2019) 6 individual stages (2019, 2026) Stage races Tirreno–Adriatico (2021, 2022) Paris–Nice (2023) Volta a Catalunya (2024) Critérium du Dauphiné (2025) Tour de Romandie (2026) Tour de Suisse (2026) Tour of California (2019) Volta ao Algarve (2019) Volta a la Comunitat Valenciana (2020) Tour of Slovenia (2021, 2022) UAE Tour (2021, 2022, 2025) Vuelta a Andalucía (2023) One-day races and Classics World Road Race Championships (2024, 2025) European Road Race Championships (2025) National Road Race Championships (2023) National Time Trial Champ (2019, 2020, 2023) Milan–San Remo (2026) Tour of Flanders (2023, 2025, 2026) Liège–Bastogne–Liège (2021, 2024, 2025, 2026) Giro di Lombardia (2021, 2022, 2023, 2024, 2025) Strade Bianche (2022, 2024, 2025, 2026) Tre Valli Varesine (2022, 2025) GP de Montréal (2022, 2024) Amstel Gold Race (2023) La Flèche Wallonne (2023, 2025) Giro dell'Emilia (2024) Other Laureus nominee (2025, 2026) Vélo d'Or (2021, 2024, 2025) UCI World Ranking (2021–2026) UCI Europe Tour (2021–2026)
Medal record
Men's road cycling
Representing Slovenia
Olympic Games
Bronze medal – third place	2020 Tokyo	Road race
World Championships
Gold medal – first place	2024 Zürich	Road race
Gold medal – first place	2025 Kigali	Road race
Bronze medal – third place	2023 Glasgow	Road race
European Championships
Gold medal – first place	2025 Guilherand-Granges	Road race

Tadej Pogačar (Slovene: [taˈdɛ́ːj pɔˈɡáːtʃaɾ]; born 21 September 1998), nicknamed "Pogi", is a Slovenian professional cyclist who rides for UCI WorldTeam UAE Team Emirates XRG. His victories include five Tours de France (2020, 2021, 2024, 2025 and 2026), the 2024 Giro d'Italia, and thirteen one-day Monuments (Milan–San Remo once, Tour of Flanders three times, Liège–Bastogne–Liège four times and Giro di Lombardia five times), as well as the World Championship Road Race twice. Comfortable in time-trialing, one-day classic riding and grand-tour climbing, he has been compared to all-round cyclists such as Eddy Merckx and Bernard Hinault. Despite his youth, he is considered one of the greatest cyclists of all time.

Pogačar was successful as a junior rider, winning the 2018 Tour de l'Avenir. In 2019, he became the youngest cyclist at 20, to win a UCI World Tour race at the Tour of California. In both his 2020 debut at the Tour de France and the next year, he won three stages and the general, mountains, and young-rider classifications, becoming the only rider to win these three classifications simultaneously. 2021 also saw Pogačar's first successes in the Monument one-day races, at the Giro di Lombardia and Liège–Bastogne–Liège. Subsequent seasons saw further wins in these, with the Tour of Flanders also added in 2023. Meanwhile, in the Grand Tours, Pogačar had consecutive second-place finishes in the Tour de France to Jonas Vingegaard, with whom his rivalry is considered to be one of the greatest of all time. This run ended in 2024 when he completed the first Giro d'Italia and Tour de France double since 1998, winning 12 stages across both races, adding the World Championship to become only the third to achieve the Triple Crown of Cycling. In 2025, he became the first rider to retain both the Tour de France and the World Championship. In 2026, Pogačar became the 5th person to win the Tour de France 5 times.

Pogačar has been praised for his attacking riding style, an approach which Pogačar himself has jokingly referred to as a "stupid instinct" during a time when many others have ridden more conservatively to manage energy levels. His aim to be competitive across both the Monuments and Grand Tours has been labelled as a return to "classic" bike racing of the 1960s–1980s, and this success across multiple fronts has led to him being the UCI road racing world No.1 for a record total number of weeks and record number of consecutive weeks.

== Career ==
=== Early career ===
Pogačar followed his older brother Tilen in joining the Rog Ljubljana club at the age of nine. In 2011 he came to the attention of Road World Championship medalist Andrej Hauptman, who later became his coach, and head coach & selector for the Slovenian national cycling team. Hauptman watched Pogačar pursuing a group of much older teenagers from 100 meters behind. Thinking that Pogačar was struggling to keep up with the older riders, he told the race organisers that they should provide some assistance to Pogačar: the organisers explained that the younger rider was in fact about to lap the group he was chasing. Hauptman subsequently managed Pogačar as an under-23 rider with the Rog–Ljubljana team, before joining UAE Team Emirates as a directeur sportif in May 2019, after Pogačar joined the team.

In 2018, Pogačar won the Tour de l'Avenir (an under-23 race similar to the Tour de France), riding for the Slovenian national team.

=== UAE Team Emirates (2019–present) ===
==== 2019 – UCI WorldTour win and Grand Tour debut ====
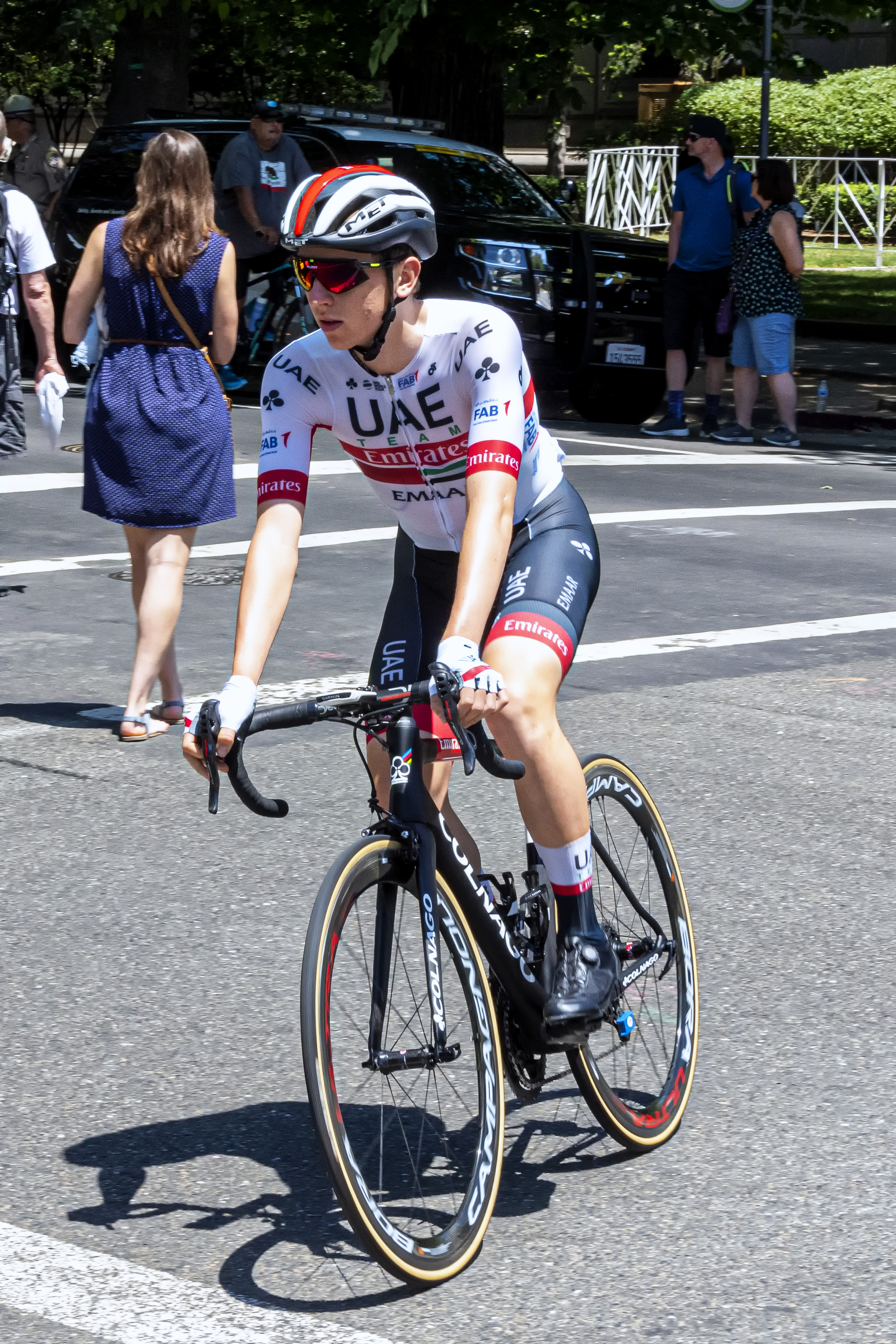
2019 Tour of California

In August 2018, UAE Team Emirates announced they had signed Pogačar for the 2019 season, describing him as a "very talented young Slovenian cyclist". In 2019, Pogačar made his debut for the team at the Tour Down Under, where he finished 13th overall. He went on to win the Volta ao Algarve, taking the race lead after winning the second stage. He also placed sixth at the Tour of the Basque Country. In May 2019, he won the Tour of California, becoming at this time the youngest rider to win a UCI WorldTour stage race. He took the race lead after winning the queen stage to Mount Baldy on stage 6. In June, Pogačar won the Slovenian national time trial championship after beating Matej Mohorič by 29 seconds.

In August, Pogačar was named in the team's start list for the Vuelta a España, his debut in a Grand Tour. In the first week, he performed strongly, placing himself in the top ten on GC (General Classification) before winning his first Grand Tour stage on the rain-soaked stage to Cortals d'Encamp. The win allowed him to move inside the top five on GC. On stage 13, which finished on the steep climb of Los Machucos, he was the only rider to stay with the race leader and his compatriot, Primož Roglič. Pogačar ended up winning his second stage to move up to third overall, where he stayed heading into the second rest day. After losing time on stage 18, he dropped down to fifth on GC. On the penultimate stage, with one last chance to move up the standings, Pogačar launched an attack, going on an almost 40-kilometre (25 mi) solo breakaway. He eventually took his third stage win, winning by more than a minute and a half over the rest of the contenders. The win allowed him to finish the Vuelta in third overall, the final podium position, and giving him the victory in the young rider classification.

==== 2020 – first Tour win ====
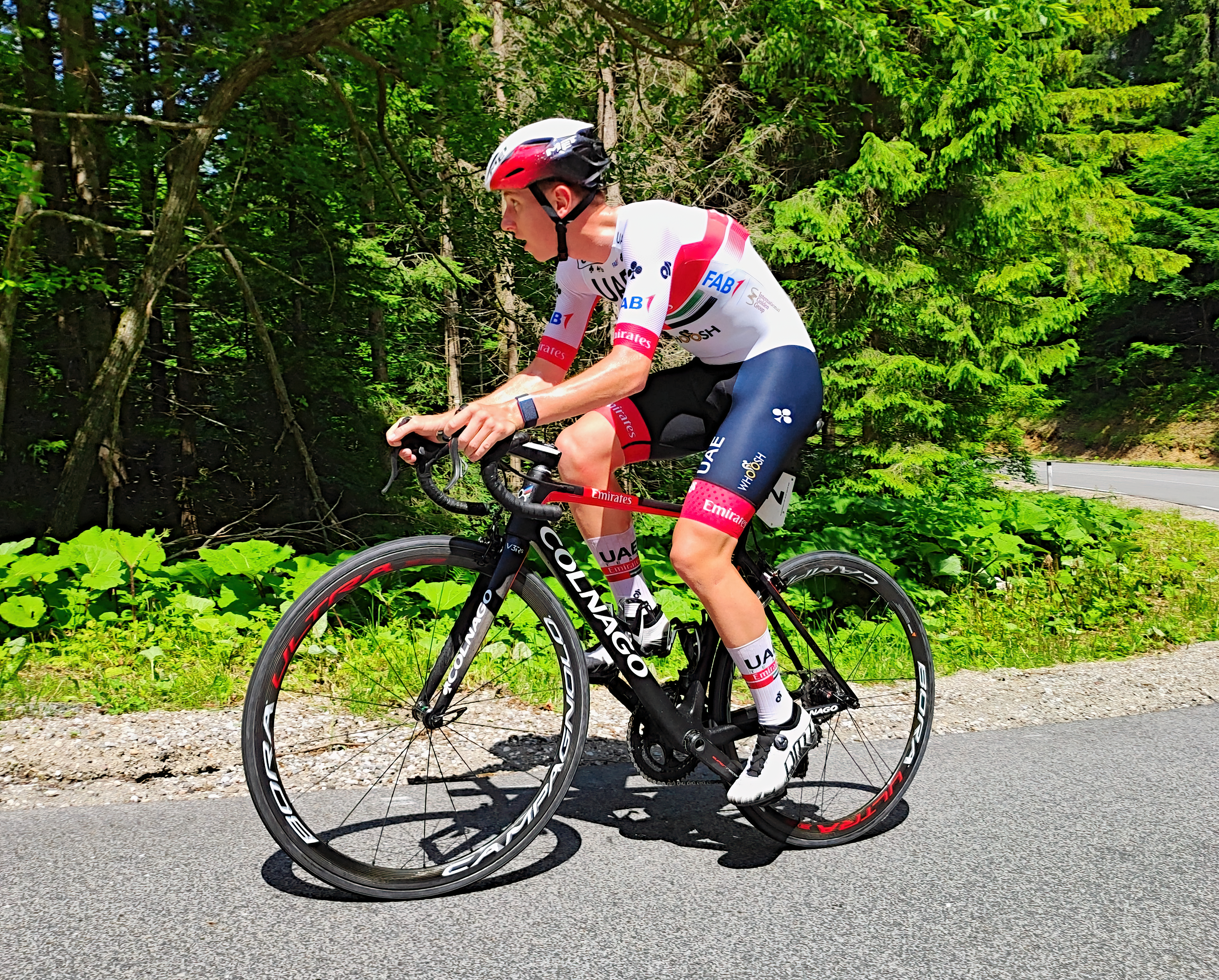
In 2020, Pogačar won the Slovenian National Time Trial Championships for the second straight year.

Before the season started, Pogačar announced that he would ride his first Tour de France that year, riding in support of Fabio Aru. He made his season debut at the Volta a la Comunitat Valenciana, winning two stages and the race. At the curtailed UAE Tour, he won the fifth stage, which finished atop the Jebel Hafeet, and finished second to Adam Yates on GC. In March, cycling events were postponed by the COVID-19 pandemic. When the season resumed, he took fourth overall in the Critérium du Dauphiné. In the Slovenian national championships, he finished second to Primož Roglič in the road race then defeated him in the time trial to defend his title.

In the Tour de France, Pogačar quickly demonstrated that he was in better form than Aru, his team's initial leader, after finishing second to Roglič on stage four, which finished atop the climb of Orcières-Merlette. He lost almost a minute and a half on stage 7, which was affected by crosswinds. The next day, he clawed back 38 seconds when he attacked on the Col de Peyresourde. After Aru withdrew on stage 9, Pogačar won the stage to Laruns, his first Tour stage win, by outsprinting Egan Bernal; Roglič, who took the maillot jaune; and Marc Hirschi, who had been on an 80-kilometre (50 mi) solo breakaway. On stage 13, which finished atop the steep climb of Puy Mary, he was the only rider to stay with Roglič. He moved up to second overall at 44 seconds down and took the lead in the young rider classification. Two days later, he outsprinted Roglič at the top of the Col du Grand Colombier to take his second stage of the race.

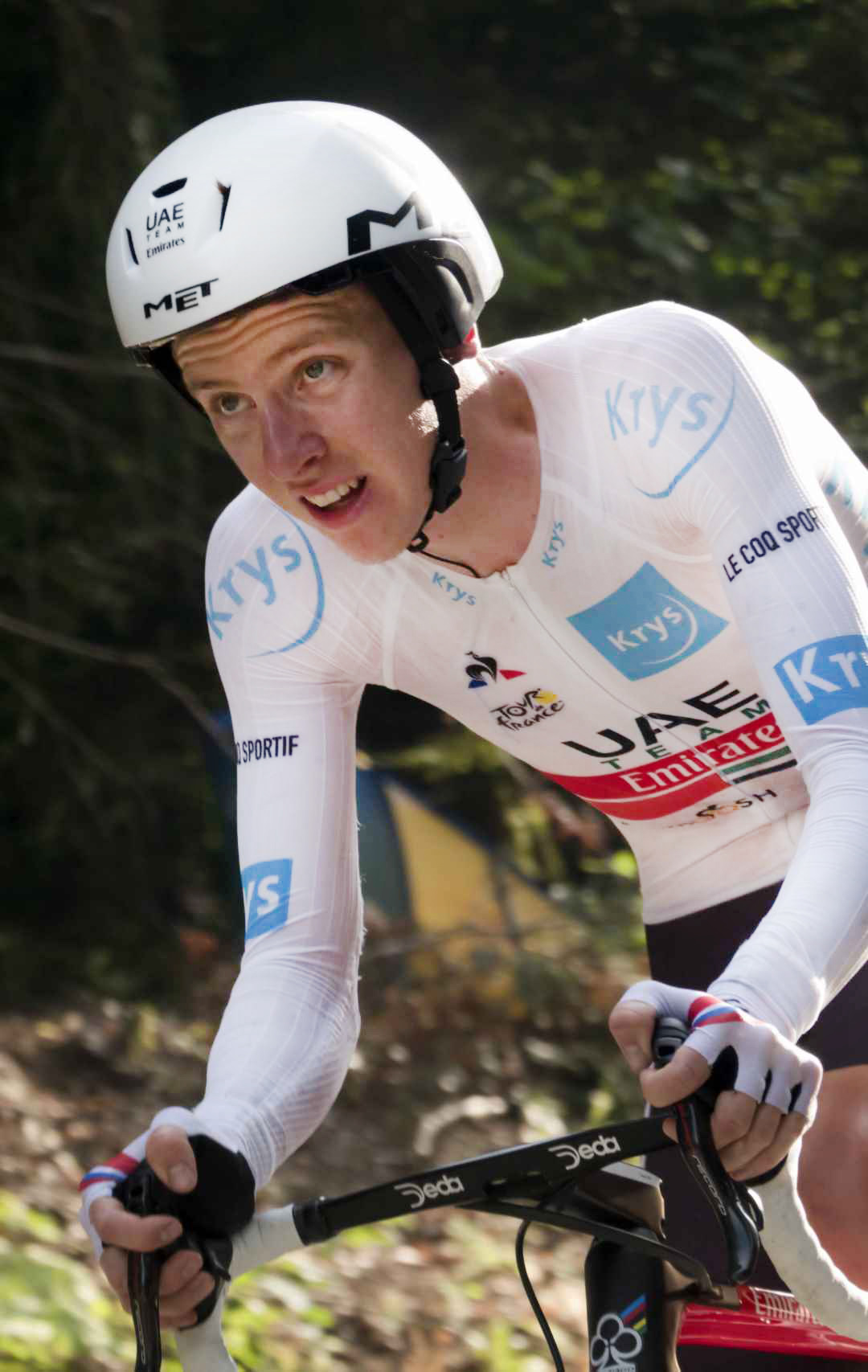
Pogačar during the decisive Stage 20 time trial at the 2020 Tour de France

At the beginning of the third week, Pogačar sat in second overall at 40 seconds behind Roglič. On stage 17, the queen stage, which finished atop the Col de la Loze, he struggled to follow Roglič, ultimately losing 17 seconds. Ahead of the penultimate stage, a 36.2-kilometre (22.5 mi) time trial finishing at La Planche des Belles Filles, Pogačar faced a 57-second deficit to Roglič. He began to claw back time from his compatriot, and he headed into the final climb with a lead of 36 seconds in the stage and a deficit of 21 seconds on the virtual GC. Pogačar gained time on the climb before going into the virtual maillot jaune with 4 kilometres (2.5 mi) left. He took the stage victory, his third of the race, almost a minute and a half ahead of Tom Dumoulin while Roglič finished almost two minutes down. The result meant he took the maillot jaune with a lead of 59 seconds on Roglič and the lead in the mountain classification. The next day, he finished safely in the peloton to officially win the Tour, becoming the first Slovenian winner of the race. At the age of 21, he was the second-youngest winner of the Tour, just behind Henri Cornet, who won the Tour in 1904 at the age of 19. In He also won the young rider classification and the mountains classification. The previous rider to win three jerseys was Eddy Merckx in 1972. He became the twelfth rider to win the Tour de France on his first attempt, and the first since 1983 (French rider Laurent Fignon).

After the Tour, Pogačar competed in the men's road race at the World Championships, where he supported Roglič, who finished in sixth place. Three days later, he competed at La Flèche Wallonne where he finished in ninth place. He ended his season at Liège–Bastogne–Liège, where he finished in fourth place before moving up to third after Julian Alaphilippe was relegated.

==== 2021 – second Tour win and Monument success ====
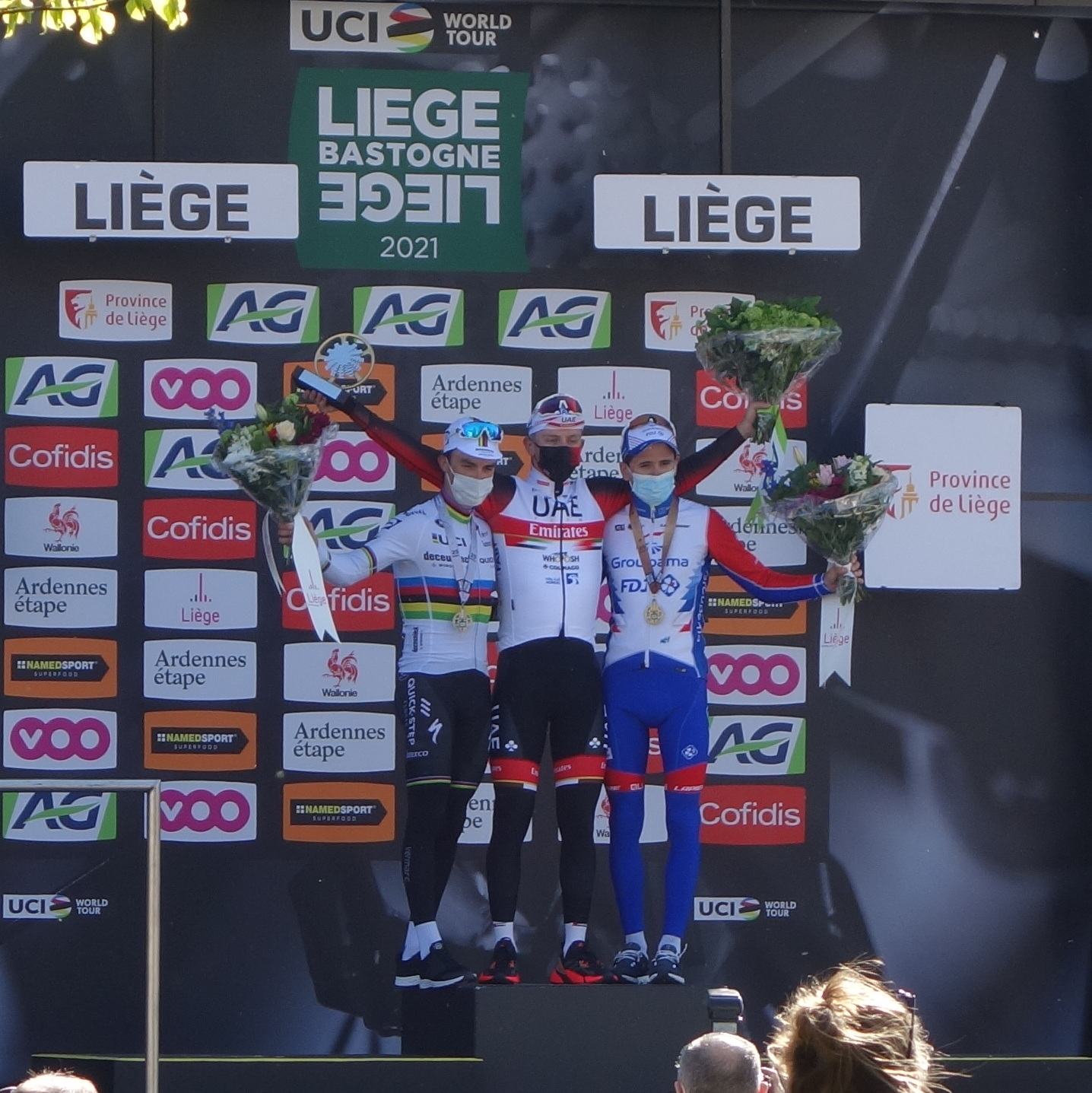
Pogacar on the podium after winning the 2021 Liège–Bastogne–Liège

Pogačar started the 2021 season by winning the UAE Tour, Tirreno–Adriatico, Liège–Bastogne–Liège — his first win in a monument and the Tour of Slovenia.

Pogačar began the 2021 Tour de France as one of the pre-race favorites along with Primož Roglič, Geraint Thomas and Richard Carapaz. On stage one he finished with the group of favorites eight seconds behind stage winner Julian Alaphilippe and took the lead in the white jersey classification. Pogačar won the fifth stage, the race's first time trial, finishing 18 seconds ahead of Stefan Küng and taking significant time out of his GC rivals. On stage eight he launched an attack, from more than six minutes behind the breakaway, taking over the yellow jersey with a lead of over four and a half minutes on those considered to be contenders for the overall victory. Pogačar extended his GC lead on the ninth stage to Tignes, responding to an attack by Carapaz on the final climb 4 kilometres (2.5 mi) from the finish and dropping his rivals in the main group, emerging with an overall lead of over two minutes over second placed Ben O'Connor, who had moved up the order after winning the stage from the breakaway.

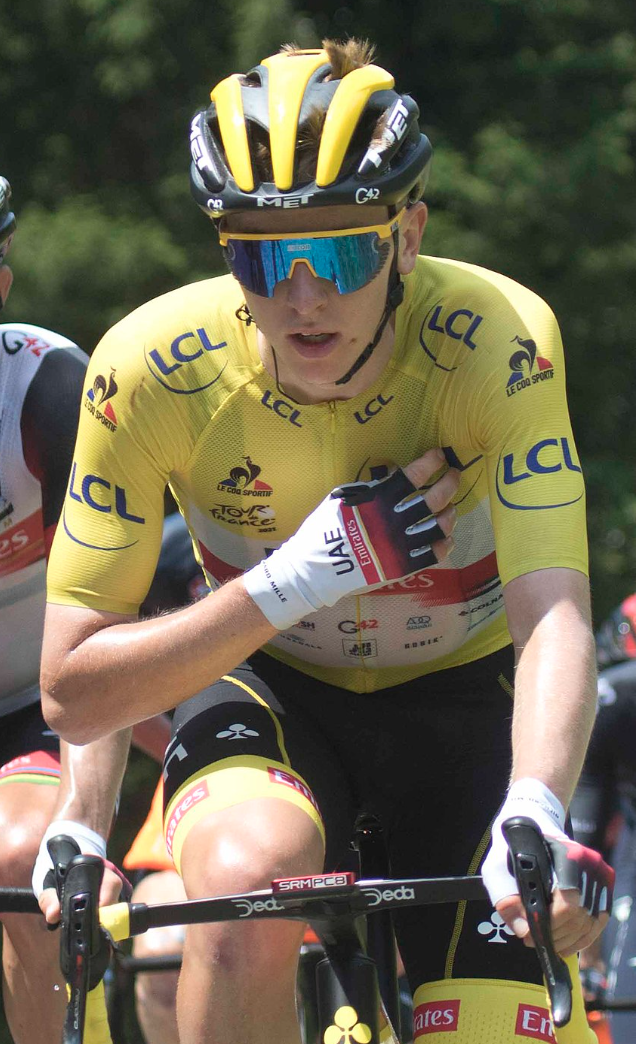
Pogačar wearing the race leader's yellow jersey during stage 14 of the 2021 Tour de France

Following stage eleven, which included a double ascent of Mont Ventoux, the closest rivals to Pogačar included Rigoberto Urán, Jonas Vingegaard and Carapaz, but all them remained more than five minutes behind. Pogačar had temporarily lost some time to Vingegaard on the final ascent of Ventoux before catching him on the descent to the finish alongside Carapaz and Uran. Pogačar extended his lead further with wins on stages 17 (to the Col de Portet) and 18 (in Luz Ardiden), by which point he had a lead of 5' 45" over Vingegaard and an unassailable lead in the polka dot jersey classification. On the penultimate 20th stage, a time trial between Libourne and Saint-Émilion, Pogačar conceded half a minute to Vingegaard but retained a lead of over five minutes going into the final stage to Champs-Élysées in Paris.

Pogačar's win made him the youngest cyclist to win consecutive Tours. This was also the second year in a row that he won three distinctive jerseys. Both during and at the end of the Tour there were accusations of doping on social media and in the press due to the dominance Pogačar displayed. When asked about it he answered, "For sure I am not angry about it. They are uncomfortable questions because the [cycling] history was really bad. I totally understand why there are all of these questions."

Jonathan Vaughters, the directeur sportif of one of the teams who had a GC rider competing against Pogačar, Team EF Education–Nippo, offered an explanation for how Pogačar was able to be so successful on stage eight. He explained that the twin factors of uncharacteristic weather conditions and chaotic, uncontrolled racing dynamics played a part. In addition to this in previous years there was usually a dominant team who would contain the attacks of any riders considered a threat for victory, whether it was Team Ineos, Team Jumbo-Visma or Movistar Team. During the 2021 Tour teams Ineos and Jumbo had both suffered from the first week crashes and Movistar was not as strong as they had been in years past. As such by the time Pogačar launched his attack late in the stage, there were no teams remaining who were strong enough to keep him in check. Vaughters also stated, "Simply put, the race was so aggressive all day long, along with really the race as a whole on the flats, that basically by the time the peloton was taking in the climbs, they were cooked. This was further exacerbated by the wet conditions."

After the Tour de France, Pogačar won the bronze medal in the men's road race at the Olympic Games after finishing behind Wout van Aert in the sprint for the silver medal. At the end of July, UAE Team Emirates announced that they had agreed a one-year extension to his contract, committing him to the team up to the end of 2027. Pogačar took a break from racing following the Olympics, returning to competition at the Bretagne Classic Ouest–France at the end of August, where he initially managed to follow an attack by Alaphilippe on a gravelled climb 60 km from the finish along with Mikkel Frølich Honoré and Benoît Cosnefroy, but was dropped by the other escapees who went on to take the podium places.

In September he competed at the European Road Championships in Trentino: in the road race, after a number of breakaways had emerged and been caught by the peloton, he followed an attack by Matteo Trentin to form part of a lead group which expanded to include ten riders. He did not keep pace with a further attack from this group 23 km from the end of the race, with a three-man selection of Remco Evenepoel, Sonny Colbrelli and Cosnefroy dropping their rivals and securing the medals. At the Road World Championships in Flanders later that month, Pogačar finished 37th in the road race. He then moved on to Italy in October to compete in the autumn classics held there: although he failed to finish the Giro dell'Emilia, he made an impression at Tre Valli Varesine, animating the race with a long-race attack from 120 km: although he lost contact with the head of the race due to a puncture he won the sprint in the chase group to finish third. At Milano–Torino, Pogačar managed to keep pace with the other favourites for most of the day, emerging from the peloton's fragmentation in crosswinds 65 km from the end as part of a front group which absorbed the day's early breakaway, and remaining in contention for the win until losing contact with Adam Yates and Roglič in the closing kilometres of the final climb up Superga: he subsequently lost the two-up sprint for third place to João Almeida.

A few days later, Pogačar won his second monument at Il Lombardia, responding to an attack by Vincenzo Nibali by dropping the Italian and the rest of the lead group 30 km from the finish: although he was subsequently joined at the front of the race by Fausto Masnada, Pogačar won the resulting two-man sprint at the finish line. He became the third rider after Fausto Coppi and Eddy Merckx to win two monuments and the Tour in the same year and just fourth rider to win the Tour de France and the Tour of Lombardy in the same season, after Coppi, Merckx and Bernard Hinault, and the first to do so in 42 years.

==== 2022 – Tour runner-up ====
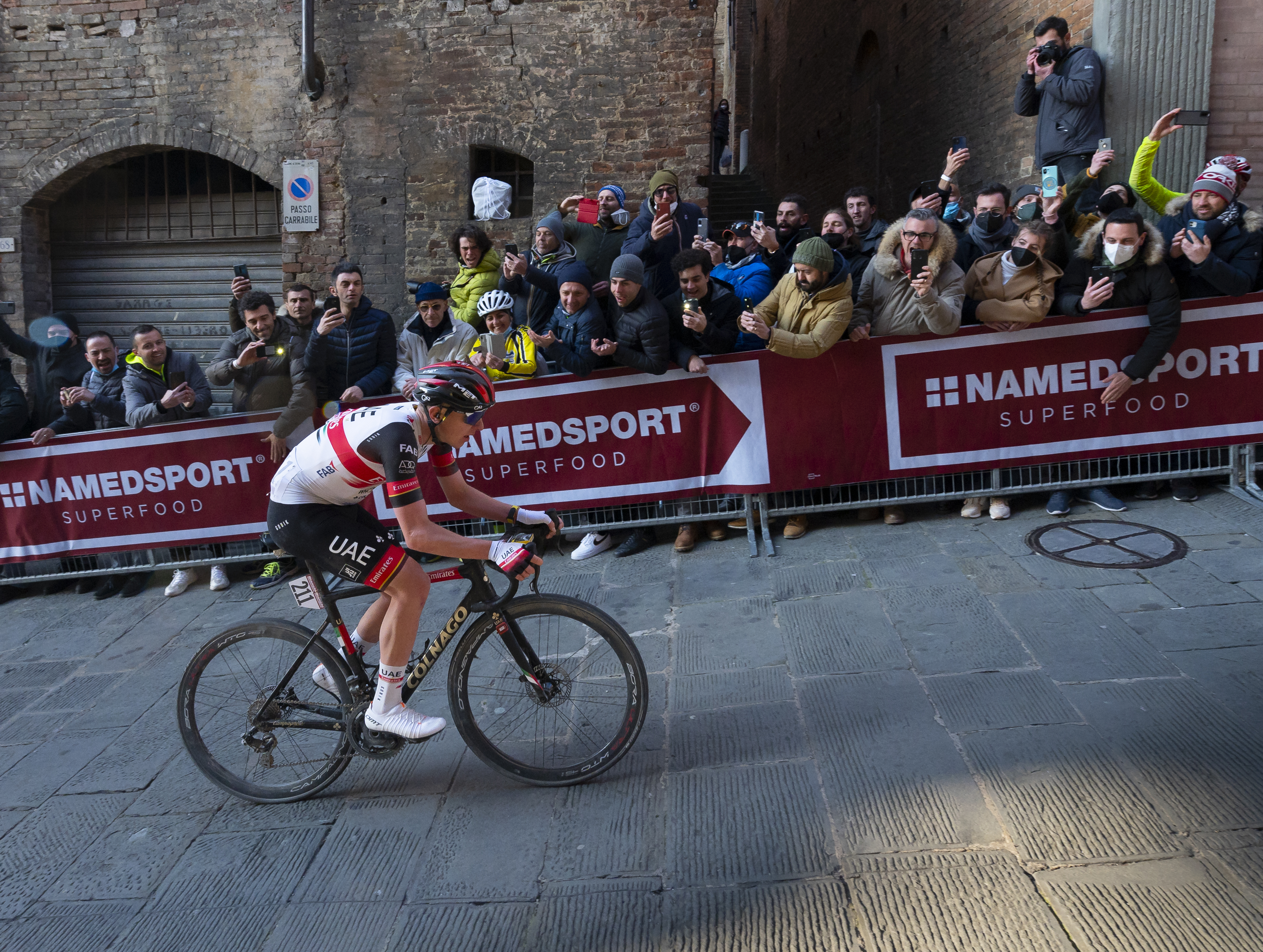
Pogačar riding to victory at the 2022 Strade Bianche

Pogačar started the season off by defending his title at the UAE Tour, winning both mountaintop finishes in the process. Afterward, he went to Italy for a block of racing, starting with the Strade Bianche. Despite getting involved in a crash with around 100 kilometres to go, Pogačar attacked on the longest sector of the race, the Monte Santa Marie, with around 50 kilometres remaining. Pogačar gradually built his advantage to more than a minute, holding off the chasers to win the race solo. Two days later, Pogačar started his title defense at Tirreno-Adriatico. He won the uphill finish on stage four before dominating the queen stage. Pogačar won the general classification by almost two minutes over Jonas Vingegaard as well as winning the points and young rider classifications. A week later, Pogačar rode Milan-San Remo, where he attacked several times on the Poggio before finishing in fifth.

A few days later, Pogačar rode his first cobbled classic, the Dwars door Vlaanderen. He was unable to join the winning breakaway from the peloton, and after multiple attempts to bridge the gap, finished tenth. Afterward, he rode the Tour of Flanders, his debut at a cobbled Monument. Pogačar attacked on the second ascent of Oude Kwaremont and the Koppenberg to pull ahead of the peloton with a select group of riders. He accelerated twice more on the final ascent of Oude Kwaremont and the Paterberg and only Mathieu van der Poel was able to go with him. The duo rode slowly inside the final kilometre as they prepared for the sprint but this action allowed Dylan van Baarle and Valentin Madouas to come back in the final few hundred metres. Pogačar ended up getting boxed in during the sprint, causing him to finish fourth as van der Poel took the win. Following the race, Pogačar shifted his focus to the Ardennes classics starting with the Flèche Wallonne, where he finished twelfth. Pogačar was scheduled to defend his title at Liège–Bastogne–Liège but he skipped it after the death of the mother of his fiancée, Urška Žigart. Pogačar returned to competition at the Tour of Slovenia, his final race before the Tour. He and teammate Rafał Majka dominated the race, winning two stages each with Pogačar winning the general classification ahead of Majka.

Pogačar started the Tour with a third place in the first stage's short individual time trial, gaining time on his rivals for the general classification. On stage 5, which featured cobbles as part of the route, Pogačar rode an aggressive race to gain 13 seconds on the rest of the favorites. The following day, Pogačar won the uphill sprint to Longwy to move into the yellow jersey. On stage 7, which featured the race's first summit finish at La Planche des Belles Filles, Pogačar attacked inside the final kilometre. In the final few hundred metres, Jonas Vingegaard put in an acceleration that was only followed by the Slovenian. Pogačar moved past Vingegaard near the line to win his second successive stage, extending his lead to 35 seconds over the Dane. The next stage, Pogačar finished third in another uphill sprint to gain four more bonus seconds, extending his lead to 39 seconds over Vingegaard.

On stage 11, the race headed to the high mountains with a stage featuring the Télégraphe-Galibier combo before a summit finish at Col du Granon. On the Col du Télégraphe and on the lower slopes of Col du Galibier, Primož Roglič and Vingegaard began to repeatedly attack Pogačar but the Slovenian was able to respond each time. Pogačar responded by attacking toward the top of Galibier, bringing only Vingegaard with him. After the rest of the reduced peloton caught the duo on the descent, Vingegaard attacked on the Col du Granon with four kilometres left. Pogačar was unable to respond as he cracked on the climb, losing three minutes and the yellow jersey to Vingegaard, who won the stage. Over the next five stages, Pogačar repeatedly attacked Vingegaard but the Dane was able to respond each time. The race headed to the Pyrenees with Pogačar facing a deficit of almost two and a half minutes to Vingegaard.

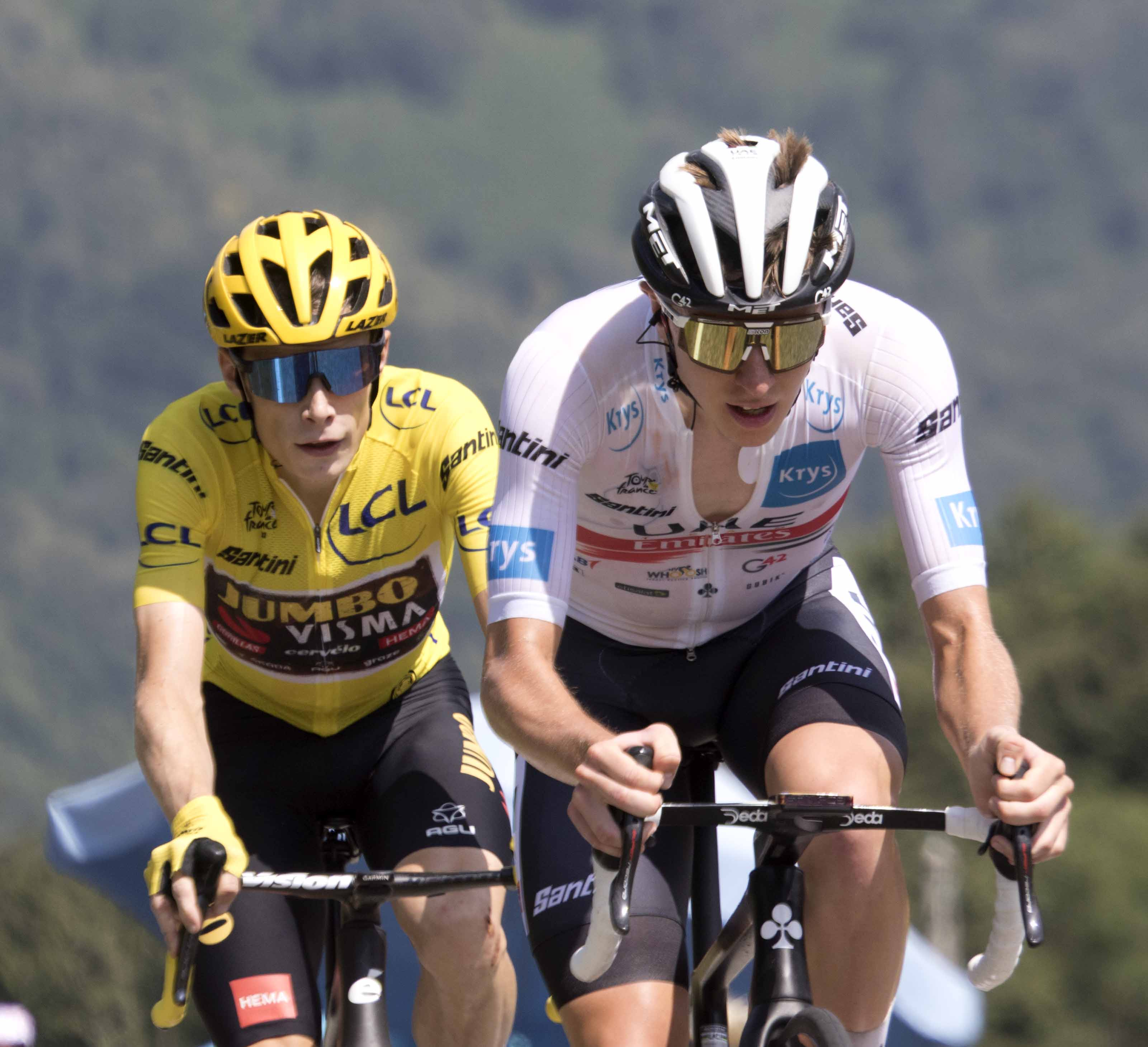
Pogačar (right) leading race leader Jonas Vingegaard during the 2022 Tour de France

The seventeenth stage featured four climbs including a summit finish at Peyragudes. Mikkel Bjerg set a fast pace on the second climb before Brandon McNulty set a furious pace on the third climb, dropping everyone but Pogačar and Vingegaard. On the final climb to Peyragudes, McNulty continued to set the pace before the top two on GC battled it out in a sprint. Pogačar was able to outsprint Vingegaard to win his third stage in the race but the Dane still retained a lead of 2' 18" at the end of the day. The next stage, the race's final mountain stage to Hautacam, Pogačar attacked multiple times on the penultimate climb, the Col du Spandelles, but Vingegaard was able to respond each time. On the descent of the Spandelles, Pogačar crashed but he was able to quickly get back up. Vingegaard waited for Pogačar, with the two shaking hands once Pogačar had caught up. On the final climb to Hautacam, Pogačar was dropped by Vingegaard, with the help of Wout van Aert who was in the breakaway. Pogačar lost more than a minute to Vingegaard, who won the stage to consolidate his yellow jersey. On the penultimate day individual time trial, Pogačar finished third to consolidate his second place on GC before the final stage to Champs-Élysées. Pogačar finished the stage safely to officially finish second on GC as well as taking the young rider classification.

After the Tour, Pogačar elected to skip the 2022 Vuelta a España. Pogačar returned to racing at the Clásica de San Sebastián, where he was unable to keep up with the pace before climbing off. After a one-month break, Pogačar rode at the Bretagne Classic and GP Québec, but was unable to battle for the win in either race. At the GP Montréal, Pogačar was part of the five-man lead group that contested for the win. At the finish, Pogačar outsprinted van Aert to take his fourteenth win of the season. Afterward, he travelled to Australia to compete at the World Championships. Pogačar finished sixth in the individual time trial before crossing the line in 19th at the road race.

To finish the season, Pogačar went to Italy for the autumn classics. At the Giro dell'Emilia, Pogačar finished second after he was dropped by Enric Mas on the final climb of San Luca. As his final preparation for his title defense at Il Lombardia, Pogačar rode at the Tre Valli Varesine, where he outsprinted the lead group to win the race, his fifteenth of the season. Pogačar ended his season at the Il Lombardia, the final Monument of the year. After his team controlled the majority of the race, Pogačar attacked on the climb of Civiglio with around 20 kilometres left. The only ones who were able to follow his move were Mas and Mikel Landa. On the final climb, the San Fermo della Battaglia, Pogačar and Mas dropped Landa before contesting the win in a two-up sprint. At the line, Pogačar outsprinted Mas to successfully defend his Il Lombardia title. With 16 wins, Pogačar led the men's peloton with the most wins in the 2022 season.

==== 2023 – Liege crash and Tour runner-up ====
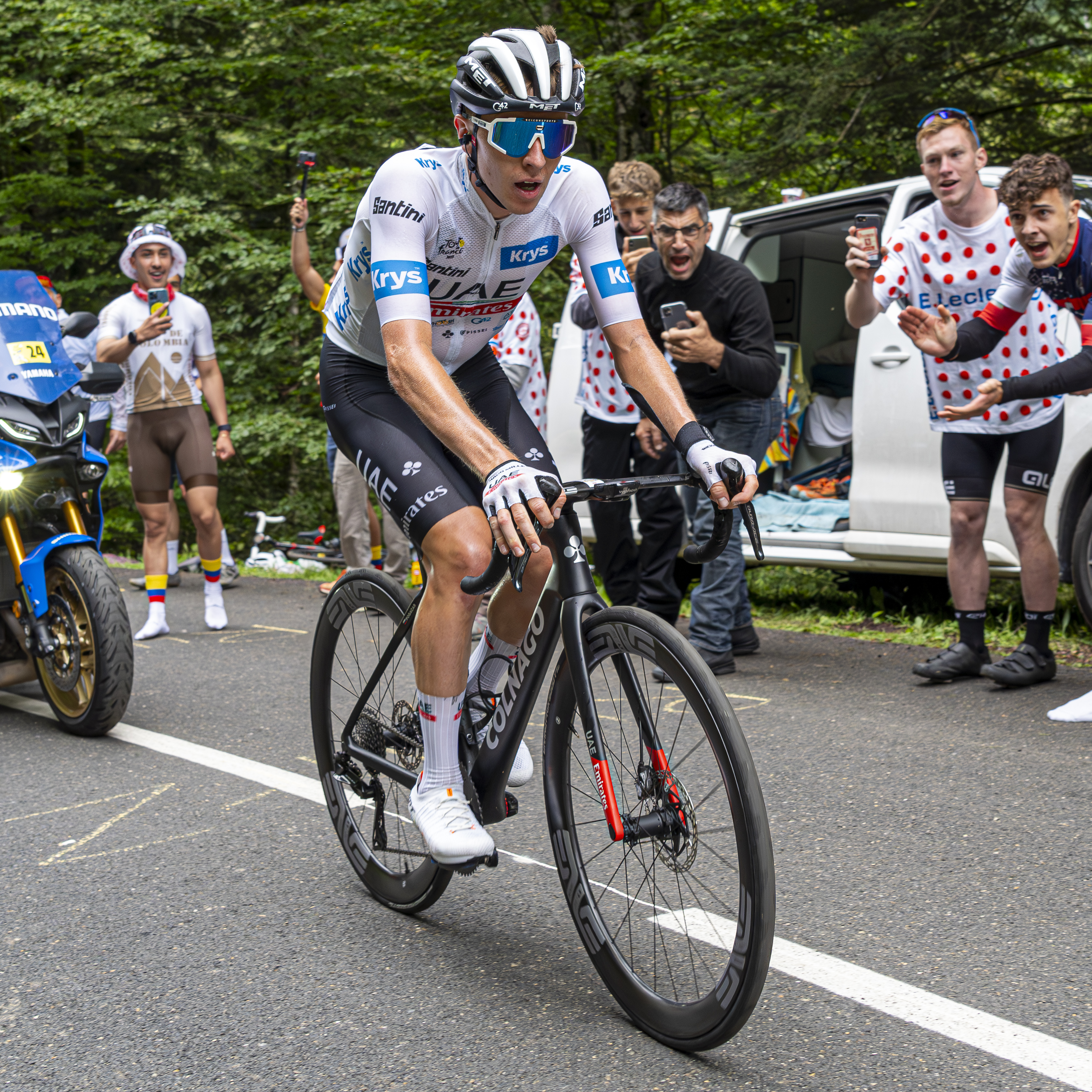
Pogačar at the 2023 Tour de France

Pogačar began the 2023 season with a win at the Jaén Paraiso Interior, before winning the overall in the Vuelta a Andalucía, as well as taking three stage victories and the points classification. Pogačar's next race was Paris-Nice, where he again won the overall and three stages, defeating his rival Jonas Vingegaard in their first stage race head-to-head since the 2022 Tour de France.

Pogačar continued his dominant start to the season with a podium finish at E3 Saxo Classic, before claiming victory at the 2023 Tour of Flanders, dropping defending champion Mathieu van der Poel on the Kwaremont and riding solo for the final 19 km. This made Pogačar only the third male cyclist to win both the Tour de France and Tour of Flanders, after Louison Bobet and Eddy Merckx. Next, Pogačar won the Amstel Gold Race and La Flèche Wallonne, completing the Ardennes triple after winning Liège–Bastogne–Liège in 2021.

At the start of the 2023 Liège–Bastogne–Liège on 23 April, Pogačar crashed with Mikkel Honore, which left him with a fractured wrist, bringing an end to his race. His wrist was successfully operated on and Pogačar was able to return to training on the indoor bike a few weeks after, before joining his team at their training camp in Sierra Nevada. This injury occurred only months away from the Tour de France, casting doubts on whether he would be fit to race or be in the form he needed to compete in the General Classification and he had only two race days to get in shape before the Tour de France. Pogačar won Stage 6 of the Tour de France 2023 from Tarbes to Cauterets-Cambasque, and Stage 20 from Belfort to Le Markstein. He came second overall in the general classification and has won the white jersey a record fourth time. He also set the record of days in white jersey at 75 days in total.

In August, Pogačar attended the UCI World Championships, where he took bronze in the road race behind Mathieu van der Poel and Wout van Aert. To finish his season, Pogačar won the 2023 Il Lombardia, his third consecutive victory at the race.

==== 2024 – Triple Crown of Cycling ====
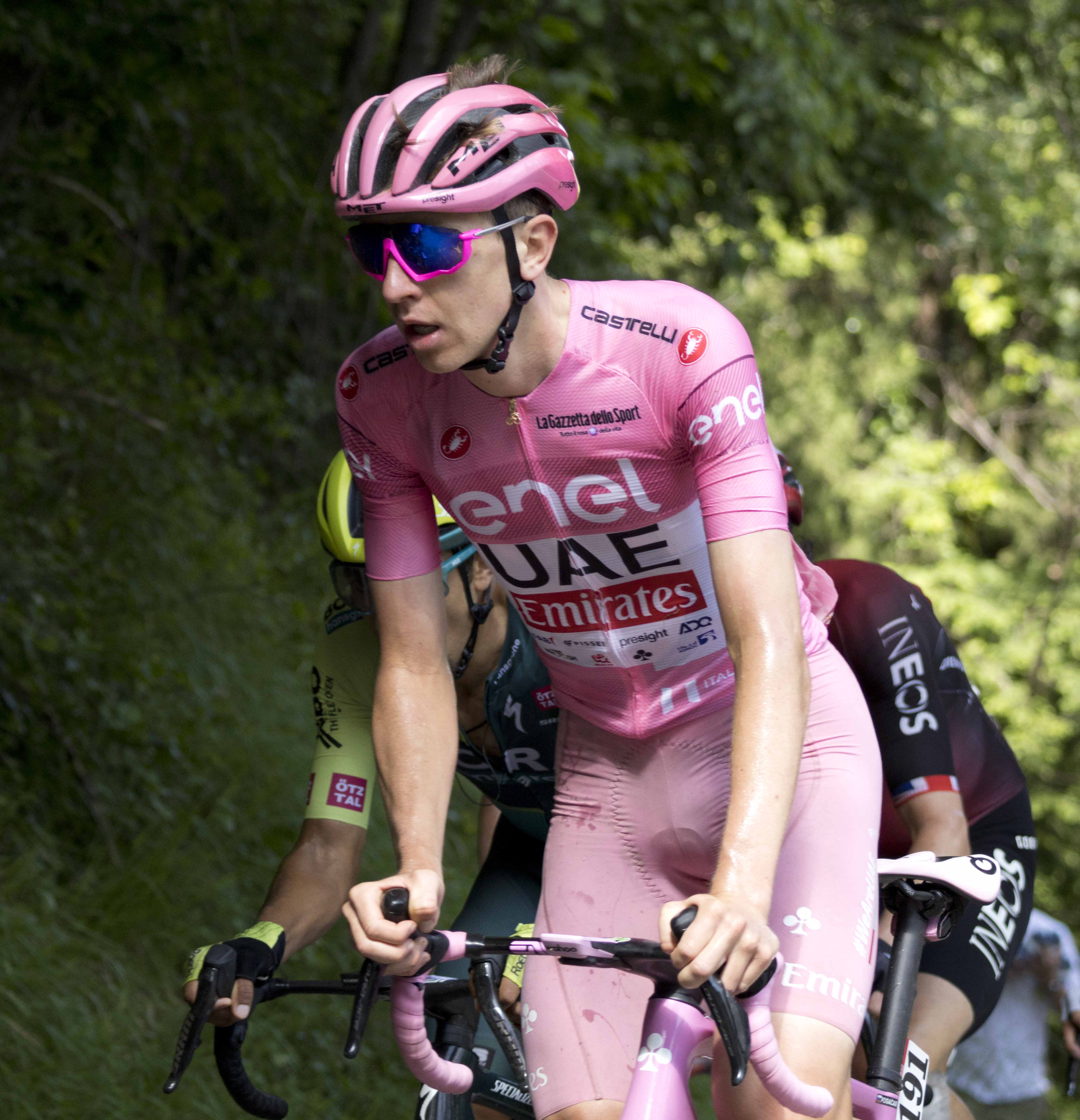
Pogačar at the 2024 Giro d'Italia wearing the maglia rosa

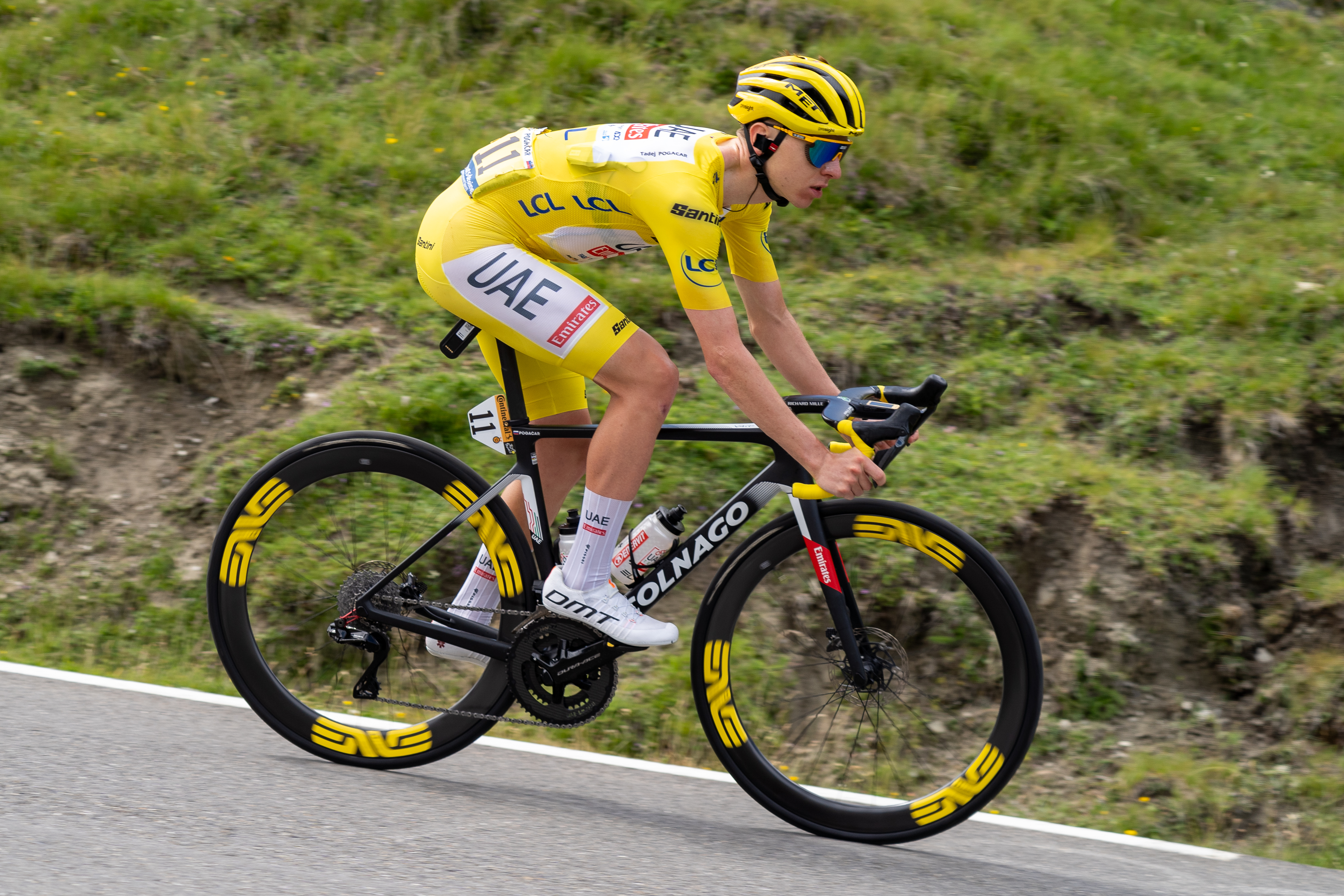
Pogačar at the 2024 Tour de France wearing the maillot jaune

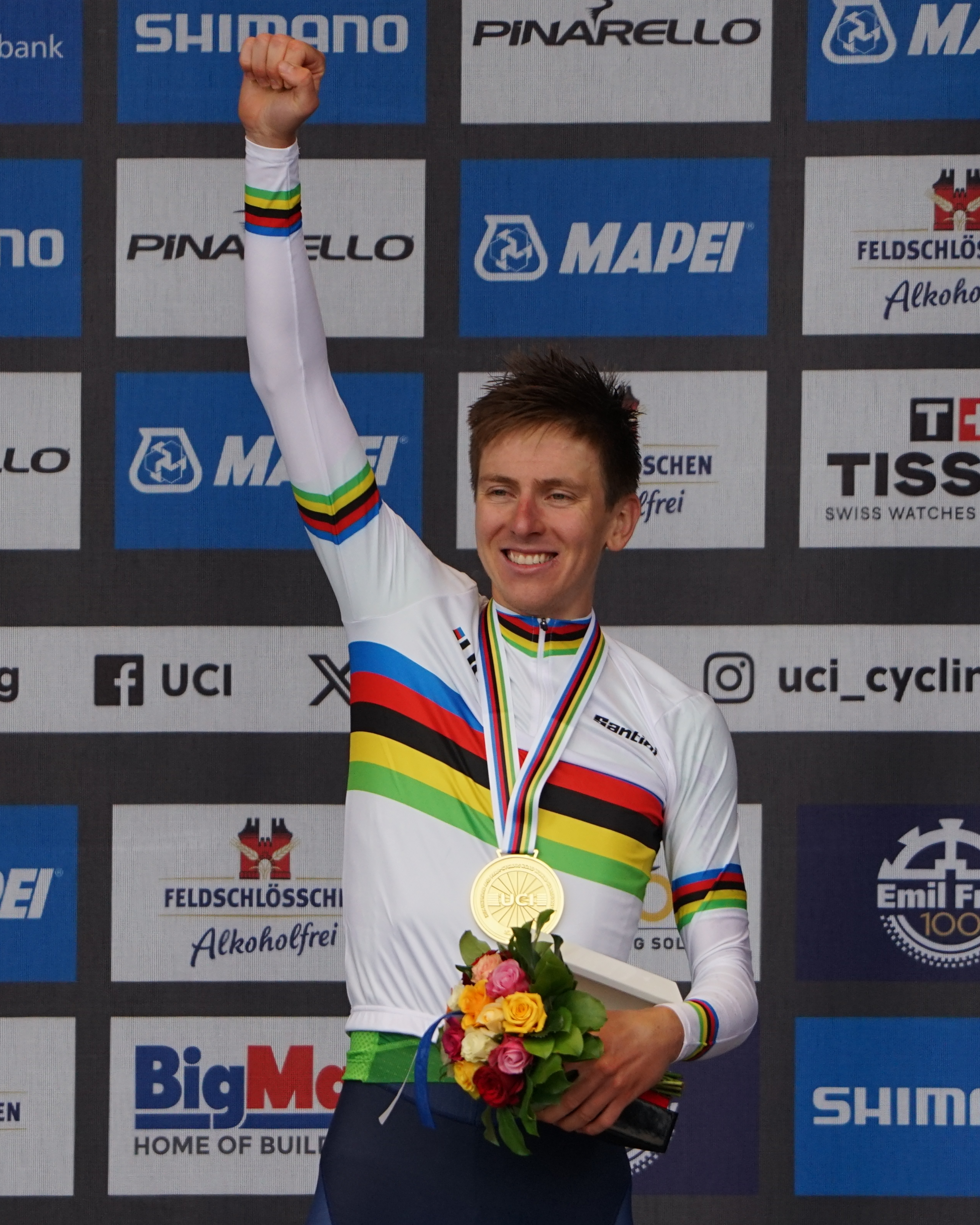
Pogačar winning gold and rainbow jersey at the 2024 UCI Road World Championships

Pogačar announced a challenging racing schedule for 2024, aiming for a Giro d'Italia and Tour de France double, alongside competing at the Summer Olympics and UCI World Championships. This program placed him in contention for the Triple Crown of Cycling, the feat of winning the Giro, Tour, and world championship road race in a single year, which has been called "cycling's most elite club". The Giro-Tour double alone, last completed by Marco Pantani in 1998, was considered "near-impossible" by cycling commentators.

On 2 March, Pogačar opened his season by winning Strade Bianche. He attacked with 81 km (50 mi) to the finish, riding solo and winning by over two minutes ahead of second-place Toms Skujiņš. At Milan-San Remo, Pogačar set a record time up the Poggio climb but failed to distance the field, finishing third in a bunch sprint. Pogačar's next race was the Volta a Catalunya, where he won the general, points, and mountain classifications. He won four of the seven stages, finishing the race nearly four minutes ahead of runner-up Mikel Landa.

In April, Pogačar won Liège–Bastogne–Liège with a solo attack from 35 km (22 mi), his second victory at the race. He finished with a lead of one minute and 39 seconds, the largest winning margin since 1980. It was his sixth career Monument victory, tied with Mathieu van der Poel for the most by an active rider at the time.

Pogačar began the Giro d'Italia as the heavy favorite to win the overall general classification. On stage 2, he attacked on the final climb to Santuario di Oropa, winning the stage solo and taking the pink jersey. Pogačar won the individual time trial on stage 7 ahead of former world champion and stage favorite Filippo Ganna, before winning again the next day in an uphill sprint. Pogačar again won back-to-back on stages 15 and 16: first attacking solo and closing a gap of almost three minutes to the breakaway to win the queen stage to Livigno, then winning on the summit finish of the rain-shortened stage 16. On the penultimate stage 20, he attacked on the Monte Grappa and completed a 36 km (22 mi) solo to win his sixth stage of the race. Pogačar finished the race in Rome, winning both the mountains and general classifications. His margin of nearly 10 minutes ahead of runner-up Daniel Martínez was the largest since 1965.

In June, Pogačar started the Tour de France; it was his first time riding two Grand Tours in the same year. He wore the maillot jaune after stage 2, then held it from stage 4 until the end of the race. In total, Pogačar won six stages—4, 14, 15, 19, 20, and 21 (ITT)—including a victory on stage 15 to Plateau de Beille, where he beat Marco Pantani's climbing record by over three minutes, a feat multiple analysts called the greatest climbing performance in cycling history. Pogačar himself called it the best performance of his career. By winning stages 19–21 he became the first non-sprinter since 1938 to win three consecutive stages at the Tour. Across both Grand Tours, he wore the leader's jersey after 39 stages (20 in the Giro, 19 in the Tour), an all-time record ahead of Eddy Merckx with 37 in 1970 and Chris Froome with 34 in 2017. The day after the Tour concluded, Pogačar withdrew from the Slovenia team for the Paris Olympics due to "extreme fatigue"; his decision was also swayed by the Slovenian Olympic Committee, which had not selected his fiancé Urška Žigart to compete at the Olympic Games – despite Žigart being the Slovenian national champion in the road race and time trial. After media speculation he would ride three consecutive Grand Tours, Pogačar also decided not to compete in the Vuelta a España.

After a nearly two-month break from racing, Pogačar returned at the Grand Prix Cycliste de Québec, where he placed 7th after attacking and being caught by the peloton in the closing kilometers. At the Grand Prix Cycliste de Montréal, Pogačar won after a 23 km (14 mi) solo attack, winning by a margin of 24 seconds. Pogačar continued on to the UCI World Championships, where he won the road race ahead of Ben O'Connor and defending champion Mathieu van der Poel. Pogačar was a heavy pre-race favorite, but the manner in which he won shocked both commentators and his fellow racers: attacking with over 100 km (62 mi) left in the race, and riding solo for the final 50 kilometres to his first world champion title. This made him the third male cyclist to complete the Triple Crown of Cycling, after Eddy Merckx in 1974 and Stephen Roche in 1987.

In October, Pogačar raced the Italian autumn classics, starting with the Giro dell'Emilia. With 37 km (23 mi) to go, Pogačar responded to an attack from Remco Evenepoel, then counterattacked and rode solo for the remainder of the race, winning by a margin of nearly two minutes. Pogačar rode Tre Valli Varesine, but the race was cancelled due to bad weather after three laps. In Il Lombardia, the final Monument of the cycling calendar, Pogačar attacked from 48 km (30 mi) out, riding solo to win by over 3 minutes ahead of runner-up Remco Evenepoel. This was the largest winning margin at the race since Eddy Merckx in 1971. It also marked Pogačar's fourth Il Lombardia title, a feat not seen since Fausto Coppi over 75 years earlier.

At the end of October, UAE Team Emirates announced that they had signed a contract extension with Pogačar until 2030, with media reporting that the deal would net him €50 million over 5 years, not including bonuses. Media reported that the contract included a €200 million buyout clause to prevent Pogačar moving to another team. Pogačar finished the 2024 season with 25 wins, 24 of them at the WorldTour level. Compatriot Primož Roglič followed in the WorldTour victories ranking with 8 wins, and Tim Merlier followed in the professional victories ranking with 16 wins. For the fourth consecutive year, Pogačar finished first in the Individual UCI World Rankings with a record 11655 points. His 2024 season is widely regarded as the greatest ever.

Again there were suspicions of doping, to which he replied at the press conference following his win at the Tour: "There will always be jealousy".

==== 2025 – fourth Tour win, Flanders-Liège-Lombardia triple ====
In January, Pogačar and his team announced his planned race schedule for 2025: focusing first on the spring classics, including Milan–San Remo and the Tour of Flanders, before climbing-focused training leading into the Tour de France and world championships. Media commentators also forecasted that Pogačar would attempt the Tour-Vuelta a España double, as the Vuelta a España was the only Grand Tour missing from his palmarès as of 2025.

Pogačar began his season at the UAE Tour. On stage 3 to the summit of Jebel Jais, he outsprinted a small group to take the stage win and overall leader's jersey. On stage 7 to the summit of Jebel Hafeet, Pogačar won after a 7.5 km (4.7 mi) solo effort, sealing his general classification victory. In March, Pogačar began his spring classics campaign at Strade Bianche. After forming a breakaway with Tom Pidcock, Pogačar suffered a high-speed crash on the descent from Monteaperti with 50 km (31 mi) to the finish. Pogačar avoided serious injury, and after a second stop to change his bike, he rejoined Pidcock. With 19 km (12 mi) to go, Pogačar dropped Pidcock to defend his title, tying Fabian Cancellara's record with three victories in the race. At Milan—San Remo, Pogačar attacked several times on the Cipressa and the Poggio, dropping everyone but Mathieu van der Poel and Filippo Ganna, both of whom were able to out-sprint him for the top two podium positions, respectively. In March, Pogačar announced that he would enter Paris–Roubaix for the first time.

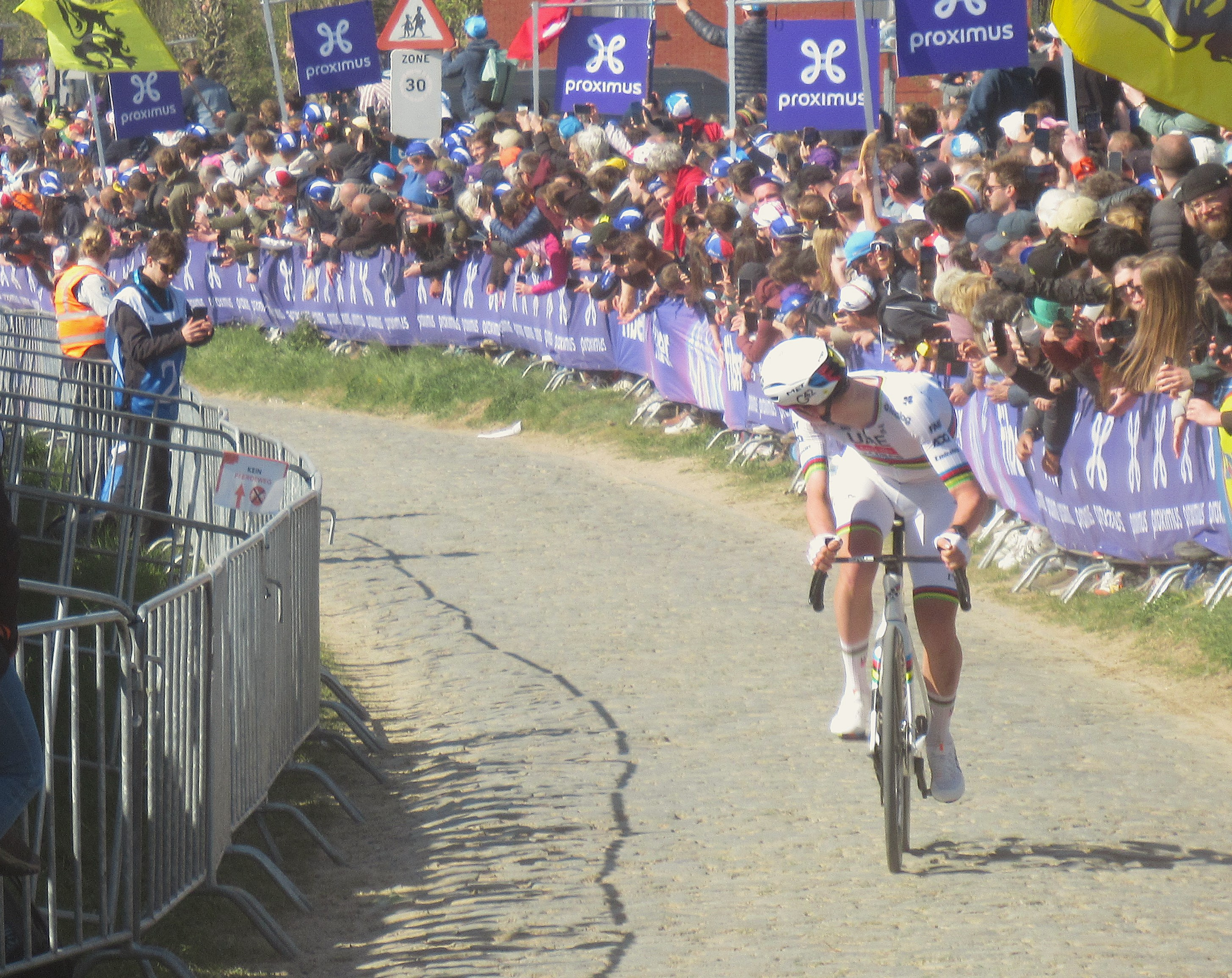
Pogačar leading the race on the Oude Kwaremont at the 2025 Tour of Flanders

In April, Pogačar raced the Tour of Flanders, and was considered one of the top pre-race favorites alongside Mathieu van der Poel. During the race, Pogačar attacked repeatedly, finally distancing himself from van der Poel on the final ascent of the Oude Kwaremont and soloing the final 19 km to win his second Tour of Flanders title. A week later, in his Paris-Roubaix debut, Pogačar managed to form a two-man lead group with van der Poel that went deep into the race. However, on sector 9 with 38 km (24 mi) to go, Pogačar crashed on a right-hand turn, forcing him to change his bike and leaving van der Poel at the front. He tried to come back but he was forced to change his bike again following a puncture. He ended up finishing second, more than a minute behind van der Poel.

Pogačar concluded his first part of the season at the Ardennes classics. He first raced the Amstel Gold Race where, after following an attack by Alaphilippe on the Kruisberg, he was caught by Evenepoel and Skjelmose, and ultimately sprinted to a second place. At La Flèche Wallonne, he attacked on the last passage on the Mur de Huy, winning by a margin of 10 seconds, the biggest at La Flèche Wallonne since Igor Astarloa in 2003. Finally, he secured a win at Liège-Bastogne-Liège by attacking for the second consecutive year on the La Redoute and soloing to victory.

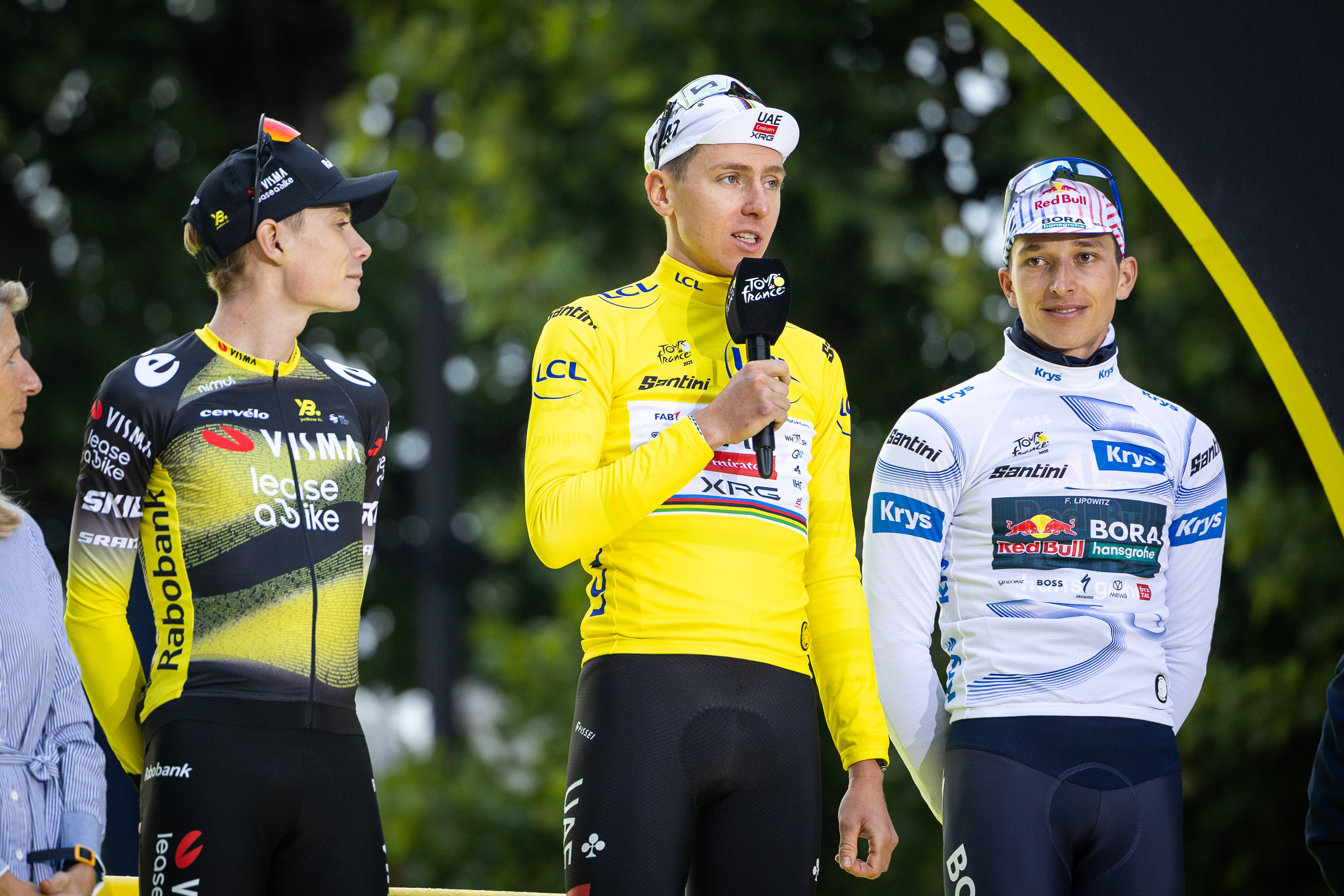
Pogačar on the final podium at the 2025 Tour de France

Pogačar returned to racing in June at the Critérium du Dauphiné, where he faced off against Vingegaard for the first time that season. On stage 1, Pogačar won the stage in a sprint after featuring in a late breakaway with van der Poel, Vingegaard, Evenepoel, and Santiago Buitrago. After losing time to both Evenepoel and Vingegaard during the individual time trial on stage 4, he bounced back on the first mountain stage on stage 6. Pogačar dropped everyone on the final climb following a hard leadout from Jhonatan Narváez before soloing to the finish by a minute over Vingegaard, taking the yellow jersey in the process. He also proceeded to win the queen stage the following day before holding off an attack from Vingegaard on the final stage to confirm his victory in the race.

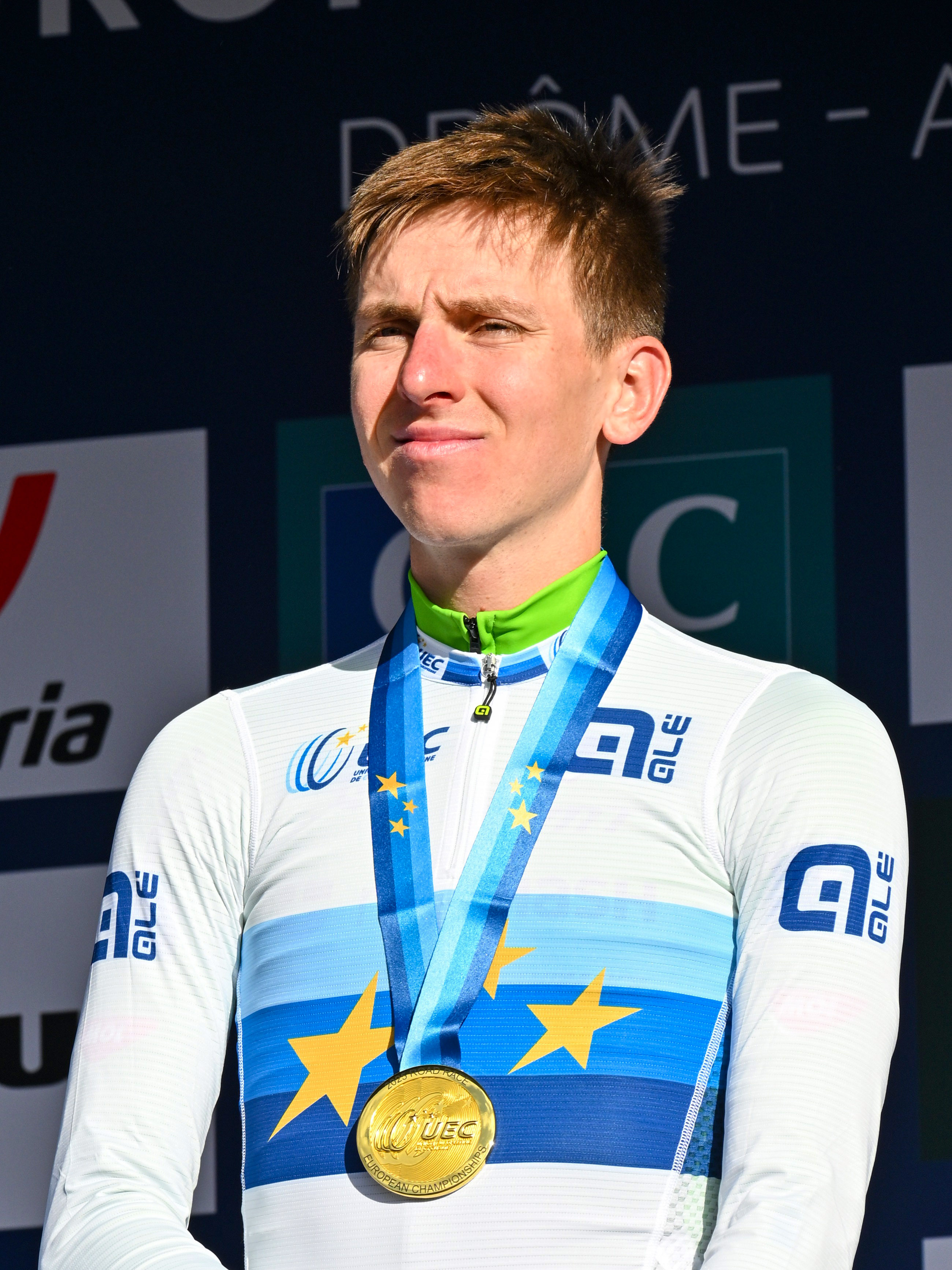
Pogačar after winning the European road race championship in 2025

In July, Pogačar won the Tour de France for the fourth time, beating Vingegaard by over 4 minutes. His advantage began to grow after winning the fourth stage to Rouen, where he outsprinted van der Poel to take his 100th career victory. He placed second in the first individual time trial the following day, taking more than a minute on Vingegaard. After winning the seventh stage to Mûr-de-Bretagne, Pogačar solidified his advantage in the Pyrenees in the second week. On the first mountain stage to Hautacam, Pogačar dropped Vingegaard with 12 kilometres to go after another hard leadout from Narváez, winning the stage by more than two minutes. The following day, on the mountain time trial to Peyragudes, Pogačar took his second successive stage, beating Vingegaard by 36 seconds. In the final week, he rode defensively, holding off attacks from other general classification contenders to secure the yellow jersey. On the final stage to Champs-Élysées, which had recently been changed to feature three ascents of the cobbled climb to Montmartre, Pogačar lit up the race in the rain, accelerating on the last two ascents of Montmartre. However, he was unable to drop Wout van Aert, who counterattacked to win the stage. In the end, Pogačar won four stages, taking his career total of stage wins at the Tour to 21. A few days after his Tour victory, his team announced that he was going to skip the Vuelta, citing fatigue as the reason for this decision. In the autumn of 2025, Pogačar revealed he had developed a knee injury in the final week of the Tour, with his teammate Wellens revealing that Pogačar had considered abandoning the race.

At the UCI Road World Championships in Kigali, Pogačar was selected to represent Slovenia in both the time trial and road race. He finished fourth in the time trial, just one second off the podium, before winning his second consecutive road race title the following week. During the race, Pogačar first attacked from the peloton with 104 km (65 mi) to go, riding the final 67 km (42 mi) solo to finish over a minute ahead of runner-up Remco Evenepoel. After defending his world title, Pogačar won the European road race title for the first time with a 75-kilometre (47 mi) solo before winning the Tre Valli Varesine for a second time.

At Il Lombardia, he attacked with 36 km (22 mi) to go before soloing to his 20th victory of the season. It was Pogačar's fifth consecutive victory at Il Lombardia, equalling the record of Fausto Coppi and becoming the first rider to win a Monument five consecutive times. He also made history by becoming the first rider to stand on the podium in all 5 Monuments in the same season.

==== 2026 – record equaling Tour de France win and Vuelta abandon ====
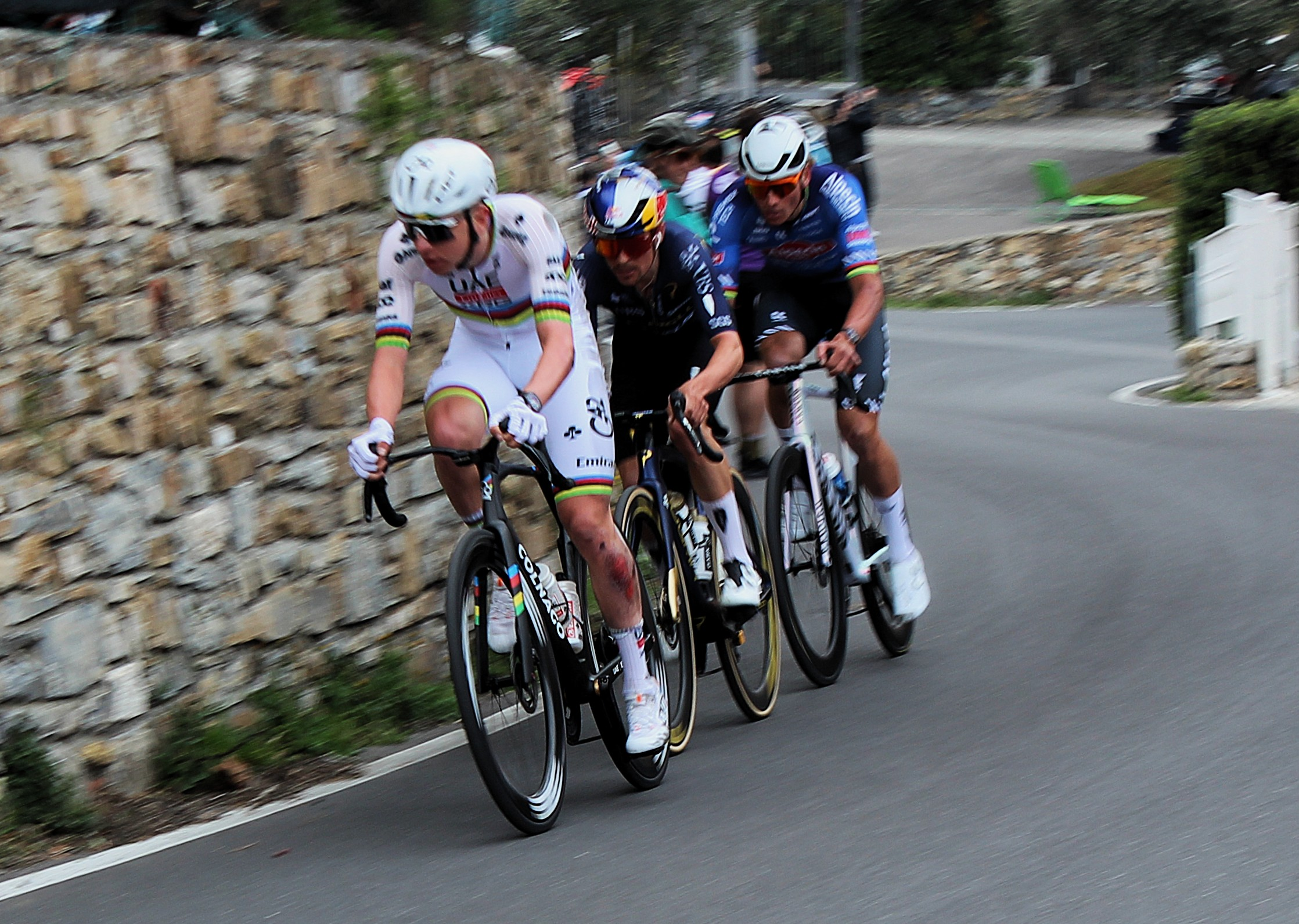
Pogačar leading Tom Pidcock and Mathieu van der Poel at the 2026 Milan–San Remo

In 2026, Pogačar opted for a later start to his season at the Strade Bianche. A few days before the race, the Colle Pinzuto sector was dedicated to Pogačar following his third victory at the race in 2025. During the race itself, Pogačar attacked on the Monte Sante Marie gravel sector with 78 km (48 mi) left, dropping everyone to solo to a record fourth victory in the race. A few weeks later, he set his sights on another attempt at winning Milan-San Remo. With 32.5 km (20.2 mi) left, just a few kilometres before the foot of the Cipressa, Pogačar went down in a crash, together with other favourites like Mathieu van der Poel and Wout van Aert. He quickly got back up and managed to make it back to the peloton at the foot of the Cipressa with the help of Florian Vermeersch and Felix Großschartner. Following a leadout from Brandon McNulty and Isaac Del Toro, he attacked with 2.5 km (1.6 mi) left from the top of the climb and 24.2 km (15.0 mi) left to the finish, bringing Mathieu van der Poel and Tom Pidcock with him. The trio worked together to maintain a 10 second lead over the peloton at the foot of the Poggio. A few hundred meters from the start of the climb, Pogačar accelerated, dropping van der Poel in the process. He accelerated a few more times but Pidcock held on, with the duo holding a 20-second lead over the peloton at the top of the climb. In the sprint on the Via Roma, Pogačar started his sprint with 200 m (660 ft) left, holding off Pidcock by half a wheel to win the race for the first time. The victory marked his eleventh Monument win, tying Roger De Vlaeminck's tally for the second-most Monument wins.

Pogačar returned to racing at the Tour of Flanders where he aimed to become the eighth person to win the race for a record third time. His team opened the race on the Molenberg with just over 100 km (62 mi) remaining, bringing an elite group of favorites clear from the peloton. As in previous years, Pogačar accelerated on the second ascent of Oude Kwaremont with 55 km (34 mi) left, dropping everyone but van der Poel and Remco Evenepoel. Another acceleration from the Slovenian proceeded to drop Evenepoel on the Paterberg. Pogačar and van der Poel remained clear until the final ascent of Oude Kwaremont where Pogačar successfully dropped van der Poel. Although his lead was only six seconds at the top of the climb, Pogačar gradually extended his lead to the finish to win the race for a third time. A week later, Pogačar returned to Paris-Roubaix, trying to become only the fourth rider in history to win all five Monuments in their career. With 120 km (75 mi) left, a puncture and two subsequent bike changes forced the Slovenian to chase for more than 20 km (12 mi) before making it back to the group of favorites before the Trouée d'Arenberg. He found himself in a seven-man lead group after the Arenberg with van der Poel more than two minutes behind after suffering a mechanical problem. After another bike change, Pogačar attacked on the Mons-en-Pévèle with just under 50 km (31 mi) left, bringing only Wout van Aert with him. The two stayed clear until the velodrome where Pogačar was outsprinted by van Aert and narrowly missing out on the victory.

At the last spring classic Liège–Bastogne–Liège Pogačar won his third monument of the season. Paul Seixas and Remco Evenepoel were considered the main contenders for victory. A crash at the start of the race caused the peloton to split, resulting in a leading group of 52 riders, which included Evenepoel. The group built their lead up to three-and-a-half minutes but was eventually caught with 95 km to go. On the Côte de la Redoute, Pogačar launched his attack, with only Seixas able to keep up. Together, they steadily built up a lead. It was only on the final climb, the Côte de la Roche-aux-Faucons, that Seixas was finally dropped, and Pogačar won by 45 seconds. Third place went to Evenepoel, who won the sprint in the chasing group, one minute and 42 seconds behind.

At the 2026 Tour de France, Pogačar won stage 3, stage 6, stage 10, stage 14, and won stage 19 atop Alpe d'Huez. Reuters timed his ascent at 35 minutes and 27 seconds, describing it as a record and more than a minute faster than Marco Pantani's previous mark. He went on to win the Tour by + 6' 26".

On 3 August 2026, it was announced that Pogačar would return to Vuelta a España for the first time in seven years, where he made his grand tour debut. In the 2026 Vuelta a España, Pogačar won three of the first seven stages and accumulated a lead of more than three minutes in the GC, but was forced to withdraw from the race during the eighth stage as a result of injuries sustained in a crash, taking him out for 2 months. Because of this, he was not able to compete in the upcoming World Championship. It was later revealed he had suffered a concussion, broken collarbone and a fractured C7 vertebrae and would require surgery to mend the collarbone. This was the first time in his career that he had abandoned a grand tour and not finished on the podium.

On 5 September 2026, following his crash at the Vuelta, it was announced that Pogačar wouldn’t race for the remainder of the 2026 season and would focus on recovery to return in 2027. His team also announced that he had extended his contract until 2032.

== Rivalries ==
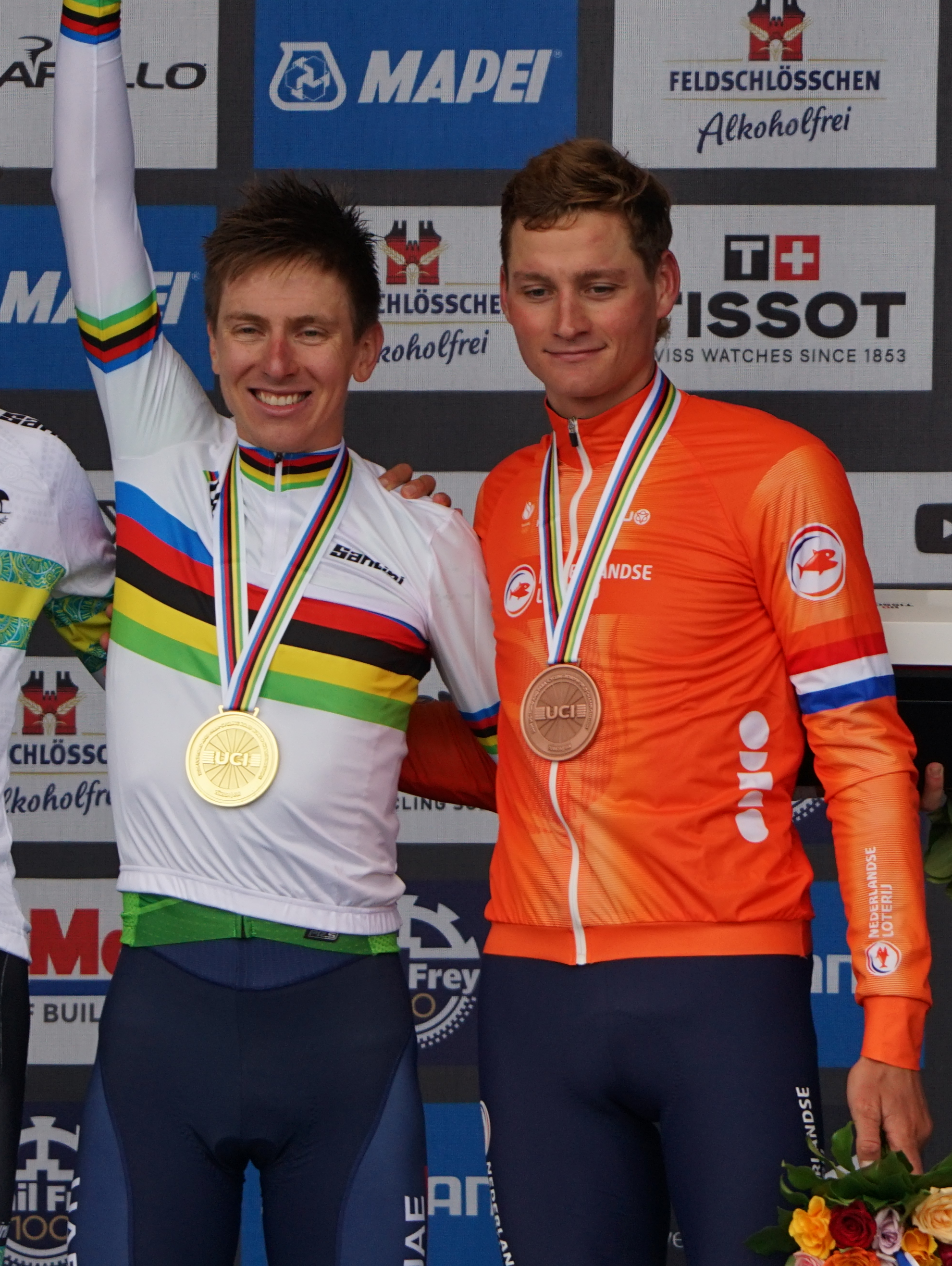
Pogačar (left) and Mathieu van der Poel (right) on the podium of the 2024 UCI World Championships road race

=== Jonas Vingegaard ===
Pogačar's rivalry with Danish cyclist Jonas Vingegaard is considered the defining narrative of the Tour de France in the 2020s, and one of the greatest cycling rivalries of all time. Pogačar and Vingegaard finished first and second at five consecutive Tours from 2021 to 2025: Pogačar winning in 2021, 2024, 2025 and 2026; Vingegaard winning in 2022 and 2023. Throughout these tours they have placed first and second at 15 stages as well as in the 2021 young rider classification and 2025 mountains classification. They have also faced off at other high-profile stage races like the 2022 Tirreno–Adriatico, 2023 Paris-Nice, and the 2025 Critérium du Dauphiné. Pogačar and Vingegaard have been described by analysts as "lightyears ahead of the rest" of the men's peloton in general classification competition.

Following Vingegaard's crash during the 2026 Tour De France, which caused him to abandon, he revealed that Pogačar messaged him afterwards to wish him well. Vingegaard told the Danish publication Feltet during a post-crash visit to the Tour of Denmark that he felt his rivalry to Pogačar had become more friendly in recent years: "He wrote me a message. I was actually happy about that...I'm just happy that he thinks of me and thinks it's cool how the rivalry has developed. "At first it was maybe a little more - not hostile, but not so friendly in some way. It's become a lot friendlier there in the last couple of years. I think that's really cool. Sometimes we have a good chat. I think that's nice."

=== Mathieu van der Poel ===
Pogačar primarily competes with Dutch cyclist Mathieu van der Poel at one-day classics. The two are regarded by some journalists as the pre-eminent one-day riders of their generation: Pogačar has thirteen victories in cycling's Monuments and van der Poel has eight, totals which place them far ahead of any other active cyclist in terms of Monument victories. While the two riders have frequently competed in the same races since 2020, media coverage of their rivalry increased in 2025. Their dominance was highlighted in the 2025 spring classics, where the pair swept all five Monuments: van der Poel won Milan–San Remo and Paris–Roubaix, with Pogačar finishing third and second respectively; Pogačar won the Tour of Flanders ahead of van der Poel, Liège–Bastogne–Liège where van der Poel was absent, and Giro di Lombardia. He also won the 2026 Milan–San Remo, after dropping Van der Poel on the Poggio. Former Tour de France winner Óscar Pereiro has called their competition the best cycling rivalry since the 1990s.

== Reputation and legacy ==
=== Riding style ===
Pogačar is considered unique in the modern peloton for his attacking and improvisational riding style. In an era where many riders are increasingly conservative and pursue marginal gains, Pogačar has been praised by media and former riders for making cycling races more entertaining. He is known for his "trademark long-range attacks", particularly his performances in the 2024 and 2025 UCI World Championships, where he made his first move with over 100 kilometres (62 mi) to the finish. In an interview after his 2024 world championship victory, Pogačar stated "For sure it was a stupid move, but in the end stupid worked."

Cycling commentators often refer to Pogačar's trademark attacks as 'thermonuclear' - with him dropping an explosive, high-wattage attack often on steep climbs at a time where other competitors are already on the limit.

=== Comparisons with Eddy Merckx ===
Comparisons with Eddy Merckx, who is widely considered the most successful rider in the history of competitive cycling, have been made throughout Pogačar's career. Cyrille Guimard, a former rival of Merckx and a directeur sportif of multiple former Tour champions, said in 2020 that he believed Pogačar was above the level of both Merckx and Bernard Hinault. During the 2021 Tour de France, after Pogačar took the yellow jersey and gained over three minutes on the other general classification contenders, former Tour winner Joop Zoetemelk compared him to Merckx. By the end of the Tour, which Pogačar won by over five minutes, Merckx himself said he regarded the Slovenian as "the new Cannibal", referencing his own nickname, and suggested "If nothing happens to him, [Pogačar] can certainly win the Tour de France more than five times."

After Pogačar's victory at the 2021 Il Lombardia, Merckx said that while many cyclists had been called "the new Merckx", Pogačar was the first to truly fulfill that promise based on his accomplishments. Ernesto Colnago expressed similar thoughts, saying that in his view Pogačar would be "the only one following Eddy Merckx" in cycling history. During Pogačar's 2024 season, the comparisons intensified. After his win in the 2024 Giro d'Italia, five-time Tour winner Bernard Hinault said "he's like me and Merckx," citing Pogačar's dominance and racing style. After the Tour, the Spanish newspaper El País proclaimed: "Tadej Pogačar is the Cannibal 2". Following the World Championships, in which Pogačar went solo for the final 100 km to win, Merckx said to L'Équipe "It's obvious that he is now above me." However, he later said that he was referring specifically to the World Championships performance, and did not believe Pogačar to be superior to him yet. Pogačar's 2024 season has been compared favorably to Merckx's 1972 season, which is considered the best of Merckx's career; they both won the Tour-Giro double and multiple Monuments.

During the 2025 Tour de France, The Athletic's Jacob Whitehead called Pogačar "a possible equal of Eddy Merckx—or more" in light of his "crushing dominance" at the Tour. Pogačar himself has commented on the comparison, saying "[Merckx] palmarès is unbelievable. It's something you cannot imagine to achieve in this era." After the 2026 Tour de France, Bernard Hinault said that Pogačar is similar to him and Merckx in the way he races. Merckx said that the comparison between different eras isn't possible, so he doesn't consider whether he is better than Pogacar or vice versa and he can only admire what he realized.

== Personal life ==
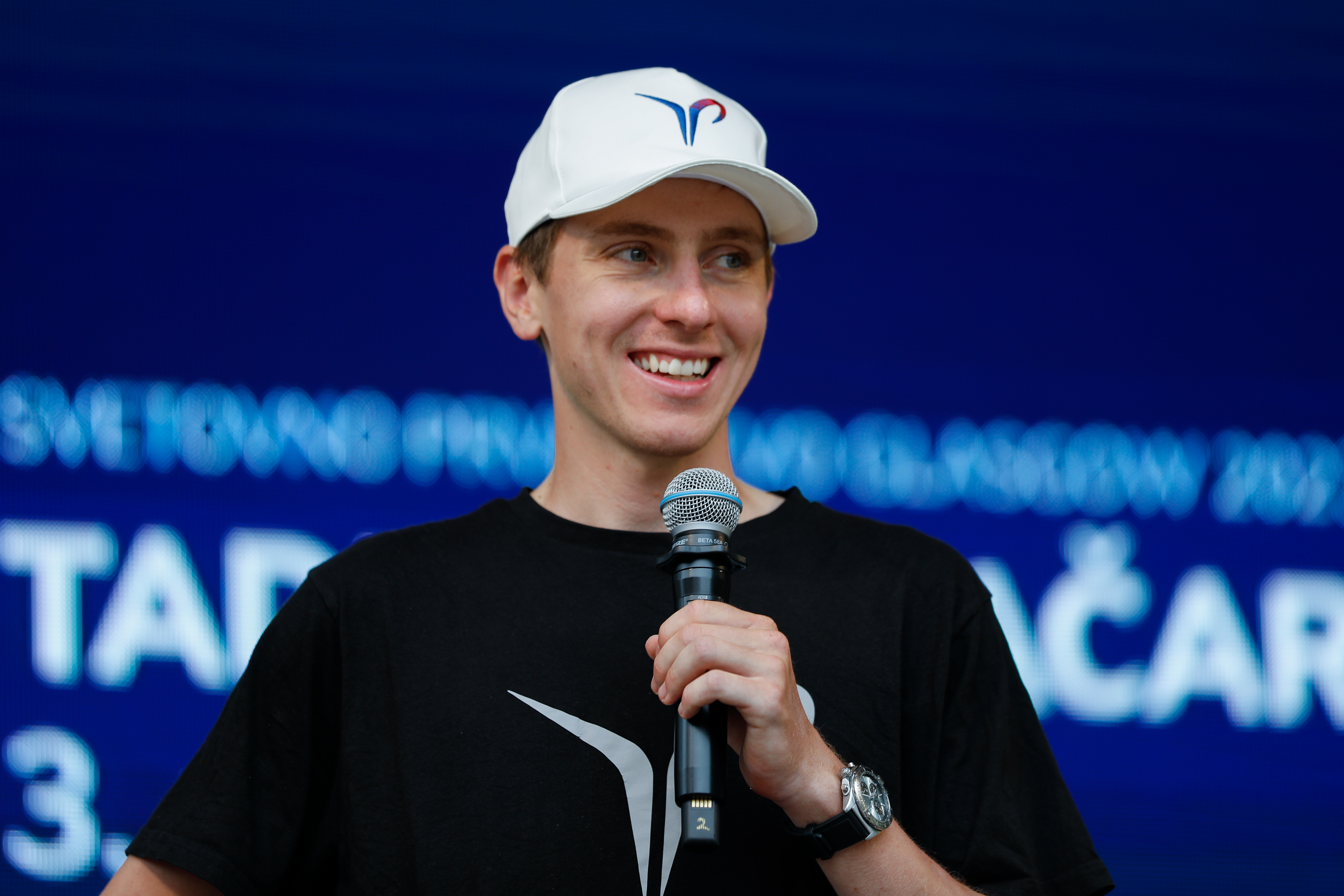
Pogačar at a charity event in 2023

Pogačar was born in Ljubljana and grew up 20 km north of the Slovenian capital in Klanec, Komenda. His mother Marjeta is a French teacher and his father Mirko formerly worked in management at a chair factory before joining Tadej's former team Ljubljana Gusto Santic as part of their management team in 2021. He is the third of four siblings. He speaks fluent English in addition to Slovenian.

In August 2023, Tadej Pogačar participated in a charity event for victims of the 2023 Slovenia floods, donating €10,000 and an additional €10 for each photograph with fans in Ljubljana. He posed in over 1200 photographs during the event. He and his partner, fellow Slovenian professional cyclist Urška Žigart live together in Monaco. They have been engaged since September 2021.

=== Sponsorships ===
In October 2025, Pogačar was reported to have earned €12 million that year. At that time, he was reported to be sponsored by a host of organizations including bicycle maker Colnago, shoe brand DMT, MET helmets, Continental tyres, Enervit, Jana, Plume, virtual cycling platform MyWhoosh, and the Slovenian Tourist Office.

== Career achievements ==
=== 2019 ===
- Wins his first Grand Tour stage, Vuelta a España Stage 9.

=== 2020 ===
- Wins his first Grand Tour at the Tour de France.

=== 2021 ===
- Wins his second Grand Tour, winning the Tour de France for the second time.
- Claimed his first Olympic medal, winning the bronze in the Road race at the Olympics in Tokyo.

=== 2024 ===
- Wins his third Grand Tour at the Giro d'Italia.
- Wins his fourth Grand Tour, winning the Tour de France for the third time.
- Wins his first UCI Road World Championship title, completing the Triple Crown of Cycling.

=== 2025 ===
- Achieved 100 professional wins with victory on Stage 4 of the 2025 Tour de France.
- Wins his fifth Grand Tour, winning the Tour de France for the fourth time.
- Wins his second UCI Road World Championship title.
- Wins his first European Road Cycling Championship.
- Wins three cycling monuments in one season, the second rider to do so.

=== 2026 ===
- Wins his sixth Grand Tour, winning the Tour de France for the fifth time.
