= Klanec pri Gabrovki =

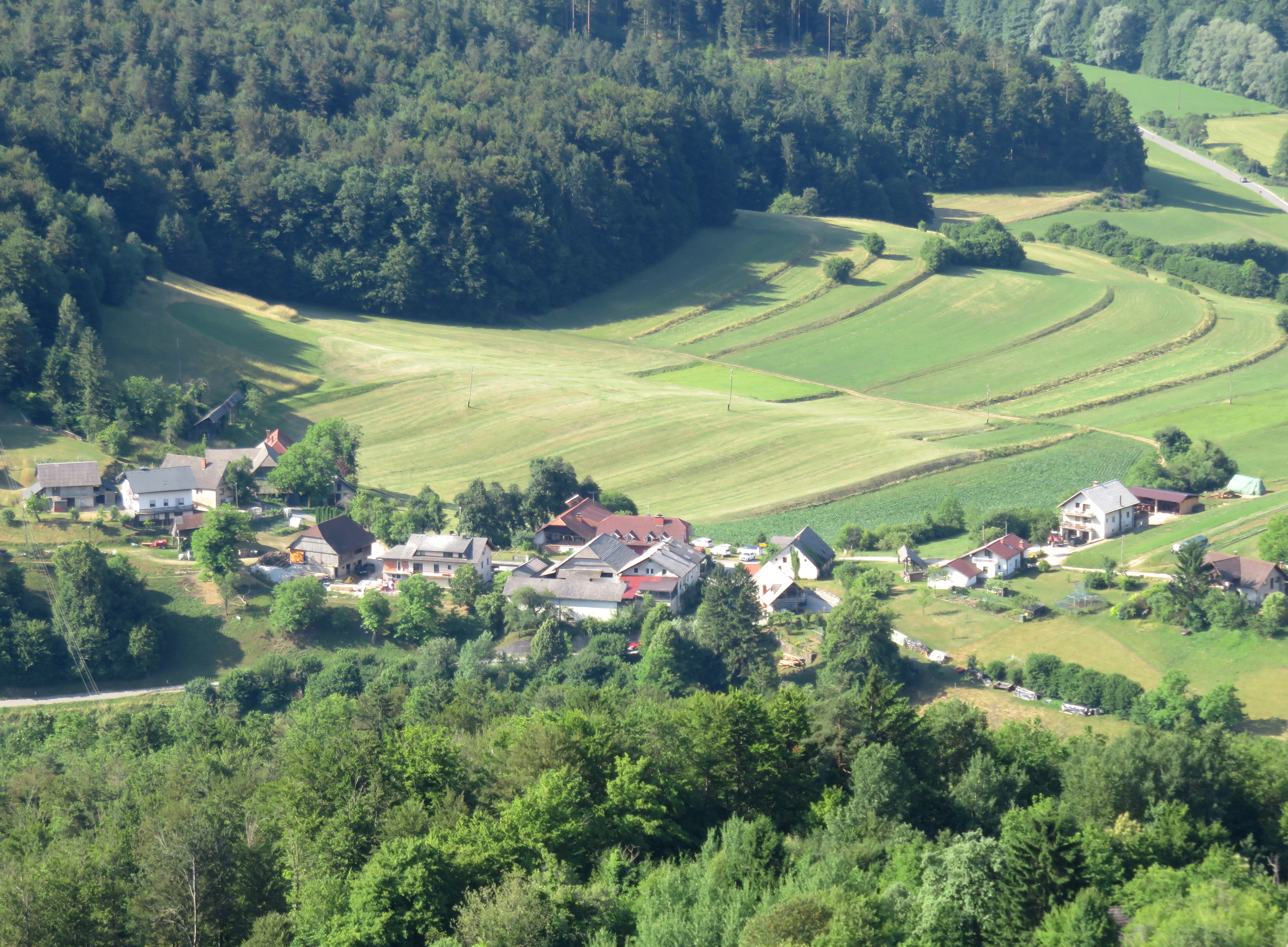

- Location in Slovenia
- Coordinates: 45°59′57.71″N 14°58′47.01″E
- Country: Slovenia
- Traditional region: Lower Carniola
- Statistical region: Central Sava
- Municipality: Litija

Area
  - Total: 1.16 km^{2} (0.45 sq mi)
- Elevation: 378.7 m (1,242 ft)

Population (2002)
  - Total: 37
- Postal code: 1274

Klanec pri Gabrovki (pronounced [ˈklaːnəts pɾi ˈɡaːbɾɔu̯ki]) is a small settlement just south of Gabrovka in the Municipality of Litija in central Slovenia. The area is part of the traditional region of Lower Carniola. It is now included with the rest of the municipality in the Central Sava Statistical Region; until January 2014 the municipality was part of the Central Slovenia Statistical Region.

== Name ==
The name of the settlement was changed from Klanec to Klanec pri Gabrovki in 1953.
