= Klanec, Komenda =

Klanec
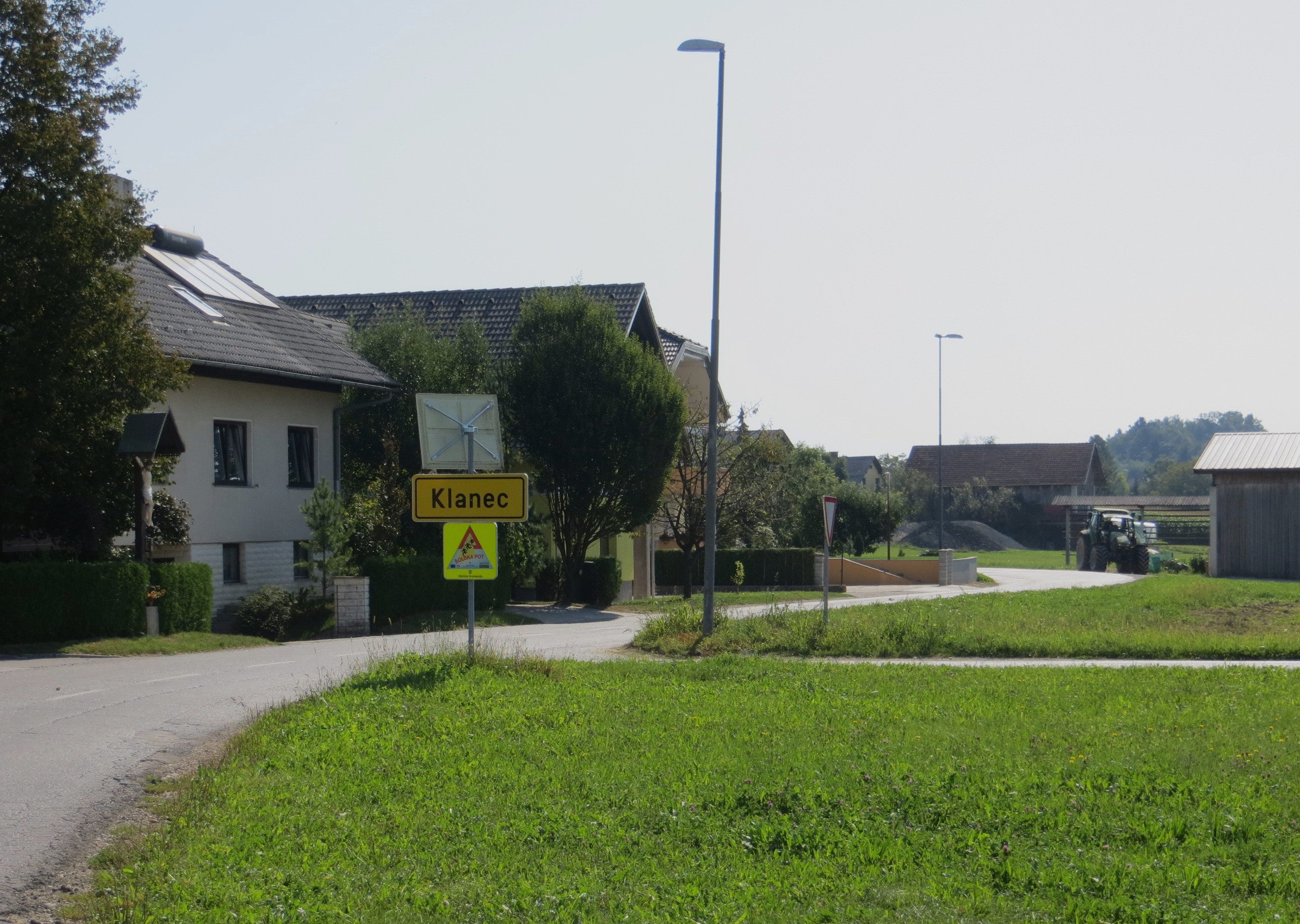

- Location in Slovenia
- Coordinates: 46°12′45.52″N 14°31′52.39″E
- Country: Slovenia
- Traditional region: Upper Carniola
- Statistical region: Central Slovenia
- Municipality: Komenda

Area
  - Total: 1.73 km^{2} (0.67 sq mi)
- Elevation: 348.2 m (1,142 ft)

Population (2002)
  - Total: 252

Klanec (pronounced [ˈklaːnəts]; German: Klanz) is a small village in the Municipality of Komenda in the Upper Carniola region of Slovenia.

== Name ==
The name Klanec is shared with several other settlements in Slovenia. The name is derived from the Slovene common noun klanec, which may variously mean 'steep path upwards', 'path through a narrow area', and 'isolated, tucked-away place'. In the past the German name was Klanz. In the 18th century, the northern part of the village was known as Dragomenja vas.

== Notable people ==
Notable people that were born or lived in Klanec include the following:

- Tadej Pogačar (born 1998), professional cyclist and five-time Tour de France winner
