= 2026 in sports =

The 2026 in sports calendar includes several major international competitions and multi-sport events. The 2026 Winter Olympics and 2026 Winter Paralympics were held in northern Italy, while the 2026 Commonwealth Games took place in Glasgow, Scotland. Japan hosted the 2026 Asian Games in Aichi Prefecture and Nagoya from September 19 to October 4.

Other major competitions included the 2026 FIFA World Cup, hosted by Canada, Mexico and the United States; the 2026 World Baseball Classic, held in Japan, Puerto Rico and the United States; and the 2026 Men's T20 World Cup and 2026 Women's T20 World Cup, hosted by India and Sri Lanka, and England and Wales, respectively. The 2026 Rugby League World Cup features men's, women's and wheelchair competitions across Australia, New Zealand and Papua New Guinea. The year also marked the introduction of the World Rugby Nations Championship, an international rugby union competition.

2026 featured several feats in North American professional sports. The Milwaukee Brewers in the MLB won their first World Series in the franchise's 57-year history over the Tampa Bay Rays in five games. The New York Knicks in the NBA ended their 53-year championship drought in the 2026 NBA Finals against the San Antonio Spurs in five games, which was a rematch of the 1999 NBA Finals; they would win their third title in franchise history while also bringing New York its first championship of any professional sport since the New York Giants in Super Bowl XLVI in 2012. The Seattle Seahawks in the NFL, once again facing the New England Patriots in Super Bowl LX, defeated the Patriots in a 29-13 blowout victory, avenging their infamous loss to the latter from Super Bowl XLIX and bringing Seattle its second Super Bowl championship.

== Calendar by month ==
=== January ===
Date	Sport	Venue/Event	Status	Winner/s
21 November – 8	Cricket	(Australia) 2025–26 Ashes series	Binational	Australia
11 December – 3	Darts	(England) 2026 PDC World Darts Championship	International	(England) Luke Littler
21 December – 18	Association football	(Morocco) 2025 Africa Cup of Nations	Continental	Morocco
26 December – 5	Ice hockey	(United States) 2026 World Junior Ice Hockey Championships	International	Sweden
2	Ice Hockey	(United States) 2026 NHL Winter Classic	Domestic	(New York (state)) New York Rangers
2–11	Tennis	(Australia) 2026 United Cup	International	Poland
3	Boxing	(Puerto Rico) Amanda Serrano vs. Reina Tellez (women's title WBA/WBO #1/1)	International	(United States) Amanda Serrano (WBA & WBO featherweight world titles)
3	Boxing	(Puerto Rico) Stephanie Han vs. Holly Holm (women's title WBA #2)	International	(United States) Stephanie Han (WBA lightweight world title)
3–17	Rally raid	(Saudi Arabia) 2026 Dakar Rally (WRRC #1)	International	Bikes: (Argentina) Luciano Benavides; Cars: (Qatar) Nasser Al-Attiyah; Challenger: (Spain) Pau Navarro; SSV: (United States) Brock Heger; Trucks: (Lithuania) Vaidotas Žala; Classics: (Lithuania) Karolis Raisys; Mission 1000: (Spain) Jordi Juvanteny
3–26	Field hockey	2026 Hockey India League season	Domestic	(Odisha) Kalinga Lancers
6–11	Badminton	2026 Malaysia Open (Super 1000 #1)	International	Men: (Thailand) Kunlavut Vitidsarn; Women: (South Korea) An Se-young
6–11	Lacrosse	(New Zealand) 2026 Asia-Pacific Men's Lacrosse Championship	Continental	Australia
6–11	Squash	(Pakistan) 2026 Rich Venus Karachi Open (Gold #4)	International	Men: (Egypt) Mohamed Zakaria; Women: (Egypt) Amina Orfi
6–24	Association football	(Saudi Arabia) 2026 AFC U-23 Asian Cup	Continental	Japan
7–11	Table Tennis	(Qatar) WTT Champions Doha 2026 (WTT Champions #1)	International	Men: (Chinese Taipei) Lin Yun-ju; Women: (Macau) Zhu Yuling
8–11	Field hockey	(Germany) 2026 Men's EuroHockey Indoor Championship	Continental	Austria
9–11	Bobsleigh and skeleton	(Switzerland) IBSF European Championships 2026	Continental	Germany
9–11	Speed skating	(Poland) 2026 European Speed Skating Championships	Continental	Poland
9–25	Bowls	(England) 2026 World Indoor Bowls Championship	International	Open: (England) Robert Paxton; Women: (England) Katherine Rednall
9–5 February	Cricket	(India) 2026 Women's Premier League season	Domestic	(Karnataka) Royal Challengers Bengaluru
10	Boxing	(United States) Dalton Smith vs. Subriel Matias (men's title WBC #1)	International	(United Kingdom) Dalton Smith (WBC light-welterweight world title)
10	Athletics	(United States) 2026 World Athletics Cross Country Championships	International	Men: (Uganda) Jacob Kiplimo; Women: (Kenya) Agnes Ngetich
10	Formula racing	2026 Mexico City ePrix (FE #2)	International	(New Zealand) Nick Cassidy ( (France) Citroën Racing)
10	Wrestling	(United States) RAF 05: Covington vs. Rockhold	International	(United States) Colby Covington
10–18	Ice hockey	(Canada) 2026 IIHF U18 Women's World Championship	International	United States
10–25	Water polo	(Serbia) 2026 Men's European Water Polo Championship	Continental	Serbia
11–18	Snooker	(England) 2026 Masters (Triple Crown #2)	International	(England) Kyren Wilson
12–16	Handball	(Paraguay) 2026 South and Central American Women's Junior Handball Championship	Continental	Brazil
12–18	Bandy	(Finland) 2026 Bandy World Championship (Finland) 2026 Women's Bandy World Championship	International	Men: Sweden; Women: Sweden
13–18	Badminton	2026 India Open (Super 750 #1)	International	Men: (Chinese Taipei) Lin Chun-yi; Women: (South Korea) An Se-young
13–18	Figure skating	(United Kingdom) 2026 European Figure Skating Championships	Continental	Georgia
13–25	Futsal	(Thailand) 2026 SAFF Women's Futsal Championship	Regional	Bangladesh
14–26	Futsal	(Thailand) 2026 SAFF Futsal Championship	Regional	Maldives
15–18	Field hockey	(Czech Republic) 2026 Women's EuroHockey Indoor Championship	Continental	Germany
15–29	Handball	(Kuwait) 2026 Asian Men's Handball Championship	Continental	Bahrain
15–1 February	Handball	(Denmark) / (Norway) / (Sweden) 2026 European Men's Handball Championship	Continental	Denmark
15–6 February	Cricket	(Zimbabwe) / (Namibia) 2026 Under-19 Men's Cricket World Cup	International	India
16	Skeleton	(Germany) 2025–26 IBSF Skeleton World Cup Final	International	Men: (United Kingdom) Matt Weston; Women: (Belgium) Kim Meylemans; Mixed Team:Great Britain
16–18	Short-track speed skating	(Netherlands) 2026 European Short Track Speed Skating Championships	Continental	Netherlands
17–18	Bobsleigh	(Germany) 2025–26 IBSF Bobsleigh World Cup Final	International	Two-man,Four-man (Men's combined): (Germany) Johannes Lochner; Monobob,Two-women (Women's combined): (Germany) Laura Nolte
17–24	Luge	(Germany) 2026 FIL European Luge Championships	Continental	Germany
17–24 May	Association football	(New Zealand) / (Papua New Guinea) / (Australia) / (Solomon Islands) / (Fiji) 2026 OFC Professional League	Continental	(New Zealand) Auckland FC
17–19	Road Cycling	(Australia) 2026 Women's Tour Down Under (WWT #1)	International	General Classification: (Switzerland) Noemi Rüegg(EF Education–Oatly); Sprint Classification: (New Zealand) Ally Wollaston(FDJ United–Suez); Mountain Classification: (Spain) Paula Blasi(UAE Team ADQ); Young Rider Classification: (Germany) Justyna Czapla(Canyon//SRAM Zondacrypto); Team Classification: UAE Team ADQ
17–18	Sailing	(Australia) 2026 Oracle Perth Sail Grand Prix (SailGP #1)	International	(United Kingdom) Emirates GBR
18	Association football	(Morocco) 2025 Africa Cup of Nations final	Continental	Morocco
18–1 February	Tennis	(Australia) 2026 Australian Open (Grand Slam #1)	International	Men: (Spain) Carlos Alcaraz; Women: (Kazakhstan) Elena Rybakina
19	American football	(United States) 2026 College Football Playoff National Championship	Domestic	Indiana Hoosiers
19–24	Handball	(Paraguay) 2026 South and Central American Men's Handball Championship	Continental	Argentina
20–25	Road Cycling	(Australia) 2026 Tour Down Under (UWT #1)	International	General Classification: (Australia) Jay Vine(UAE Team Emirates XRG); Sprint Classification: (Denmark) Tobias Lund Andresen(Decathlon CMA CGM); Mountain Classification: (Norway) Martin Urianstad(Uno-X Mobility); Young Rider Classification: (Italy) Andrea Raccagni(Soudal–Quick-Step); Team Classification: Team Jayco–AlUla
21–25	Biathlon	(Finland) 2026 IBU Junior Open European Championships	Continental	Czech Republic
21–25	Figure skating	(China) 2026 Four Continents Figure Skating Championships	International	Japan
21–31	Handball	(Rwanda) 2026 African Men's Handball Championship	Continental	Egypt
21–7 February	Futsal	(Latvia) / (Lithuania) / (Slovenia) UEFA Futsal Euro 2026	Continental	Spain
22–25	Rallying	(Monaco) 2026 Monte Carlo Rally (WRC #1)	International	WRC: (Sweden) Oliver Solberg & (United Kingdom) Elliott Edmondson ( (Japan) Toyota Gazoo Racing WRT); WRC-2: (France) Léo Rossel & (France) Guillaume Mercoiret ( (France) 2C Junior Team); WRC-3: (France) Eric Royère & (France) Alexis Grenier
22–25	Ski flying	(Germany) FIS Ski Flying World Championships 2026	International	(Slovenia) Domen Prevc
22–29	Squash	(United States) 2026 J.P.Morgan Tournament of Champions (Platinum #4)	International	Men: (Egypt) Mostafa Asal; Women: (Egypt) Hania El Hammamy
23–25	Speed Skating	(Germany) 2025–26 ISU Speed Skating World Cup Final	International	Men's 500m,1000m,1500m: (United States) Jordan Stolz; Women's 500 m,1000m: (Netherlands) Femke Kok; Women's 1500 m: (Japan) Miho Takagi; Men's Long Distance: (Czech Republic) Metoděj Jílek; Women's Long Distance: (Norway) Ragne Wiklund; Men's Mass Start: (Netherlands) Jorrit Bergsma; Women's Mass Start: (United States) Mia Manganello; Men's Team Pursuit:United States; Women's Team Pursuit:Canada; Men's Team Sprint:United States; Women's Team Sprint:Netherlands; Mixed Relay:Germany
24	Boxing	(United States) Raymond Muratalla vs. Andy Cruz (men's title IBF #1)	International	(United States) Raymond Muratalla (IBF lightweight world title)
24	Mixed martial arts	(United States) UFC 324: Gaethje vs. Pimblett	International	(United States) Justin Gaethje
24	Rugby union	(Netherlands) 2026 Rugby Europe Super Cup final	Continental	(Spain) ( (Castile and León) ) Castilla y León Iberians
24–1 February	Futsal	(Paraguay) 2026 Copa América de Futsal	Continental	Brazil
25	T20 Cricket	(Australia) 2025–26 Big Bash League final	Domestic	(Western Australia) Perth Scorchers
25	T20 Cricket	(South Africa) 2026 SA20 final	Domestic	Sunrisers Eastern Cape
25–1 February	Biathlon	(Norway) 2026 IBU Open European Championships	Continental	France
26–5 February	Water polo	(Portugal) 2026 Women's European Water Polo Championship	Continental	Netherlands
27–7 February	Futsal	(Indonesia) 2026 AFC Futsal Asian Cup	Continental	Iran
28–1 February	Table Tennis	(United States) 2026 ITTF Pan-America Cup	Continental	Men: (Brazil) Hugo Calderano; Women: (United States) Amy Wang
29–1 February	Darts	(England) 2026 PDC World Masters	International	(England) Luke Littler
29–1 February	Short-track speed skating	(United States) 2026 World Junior Short Track Speed Skating Championships	International	South Korea
30–1 February	Cyclo-cross	(Netherlands) 2026 UCI Cyclo-cross World Championships	International	Men: (Netherlands) Mathieu van der Poel; Women: (Netherlands) Lucinda Brand
31	Formula racing	(United States) 2026 Miami ePrix (FE #3)	International	(New Zealand) Mitch Evans ( (United Kingdom) Jaguar TCS Racing)
31	T20 Cricket	(New Zealand) 2025–26 Super Smash final	Domestic	(New Zealand) Northern Brave
31–1 February	Table Tennis	(New Zealand) 2026 ITTF-Oceania Cup	Continental	Men: (Australia) Finn Luu; Women: (Australia) Yangzi Liu
31	Boxing	(United Kingdom) Josh Kelly vs. Bakhram Murtazaliev (men's title IBF #2)	International	(United Kingdom) Josh Kelly (IBF light middleweight world title)
31	Boxing	(United Kingdom) Elif Nur Turhan vs. Taylah Gentzen (women's title IBF #1)	International	(Turkey) Elif Nur Turhan (IBF lightweight world title)
31	Road Cycling	(Australia) 2026 Cadel Evans Great Ocean Road Race (WWT #2)	International	(New Zealand) Ally Wollaston(FDJ United–Suez)
31	Boxing	(United States) Teofimo Lopez vs. Shakur Stevenson (men's title WBO #1)	International	(United States) Shakur Stevenson (WBO light-welterweight world title)
31	Boxing	(United States) Bruce Carrington vs. Carlos Castro (men's title WBC #2)	International	(United States) Bruce Carrington (WBC featherweight world title)

=== February ===
Date	Sport	Venue/Event	Status	Winner/s
1	Association football	(England) 2026 FIFA Women's Champions Cup final	International	(England) Arsenal
1	Ice Hockey	(United States) 2026 NHL Stadium Series	Domestic	(Florida) Tampa Bay Lightning
1	Road Cycling	(Australia) 2026 Cadel Evans Great Ocean Road Race (UWT #2)	International	(Denmark) Tobias Lund Andresen(Decathlon CMA CGM)
1	Mixed martial arts	(Australia) UFC 325: Volkanovski vs. Lopes 2	International	(Australia) Alexander Volkanovski
1–5	Track cycling	(Turkey) 2026 UEC European Track Championships	Continental	Great Britain
2–14	Shooting	(India) 2026 Asian Rifle/Pistol Championships	Continental	India
3	American football	(United States) 2026 Pro Bowl Games	Domestic	NFC
3–7	Winter swimming	(Italy) 2026 European/African Ice Swimming Championships	Continental	Romania
3–8	Badminton	(China) 2026 Badminton Asia Team Championships	Continental	Men: Japan; Women: South Korea
3–8	Snooker	(Hong Kong) 2026 World Grand Prix (Players Series #1)	International	(China) Zhao Xintong
3–30 May	Association football	(Mexico) 2026 CONCACAF Champions Cup season	Continental	(Mexico) Toluca
3–28 November	Association football	(Uruguay) 2026 Copa Libertadores season	Continental	
4–8	Table Tennis	(China) 2026 ITTF-ATTU Asian Cup	International	Men: (China) Wang Chuqin; Women: (China) Sun Yingsha
4–28	Association football	(Paraguay) 2026 South American Under-20 Women's Football Championship	Continental	Brazil
5	T20 Cricket	(Karnataka) 2026 Women's Premier League final	Domestic	(Karnataka) Royal Challengers Bengaluru
5–8	Table tennis	(Switzerland) 2026 Europe Top 16 Cup	Continental	Men: (France) Alexis Lebrun; Women: (Germany) Sabine Winter
5–14 March	Rugby union	(France) / (England) / (Republic of Ireland) / (Italy) / (Scotland) / (Wales) 2026 Six Nations Championship	Continental	France
5–8	Road Cycling	(United Arab Emirates) 2026 UAE Tour Women (WWT #3)	International	General Classification: (Italy) Elisa Longo Borghini(UAE Team ADQ); Points Classification: (Netherlands) Lorena Wiebes(Team SD Worx–Protime); Sprint Classification: (Italy) Sara Luccon(Top Girls Fassa Bortolo); Young Rider Classification: (Italy) Eleonora Ciabocco(Team Picnic–PostNL); Team Classification: Canyon//SRAM Zondacrypto
5–11	Squash	(United States) 2026 Windy City Open (Platinum #5)	International	Men: (Egypt) Mostafa Asal; Women: (Egypt) Nour El Sherbini
5–30 August	Golf	2026 LIV Golf League	International	Individual: (Spain) John Rahm; Team:4Aces GC
6	Boxing	(Mexico) Christian Medina vs. Adrian Curiel (men's title WBO #2)	International	(Mexico) Christian Medina (WBO bantamweight world title)
6–8	Athletics	(China) 2026 Asian Indoor Athletics Championships	Continental	China
6–22	Multi-sport	(Italy) 2026 Winter Olympics	International	Norway
7	Boxing	(United Kingdom) Nick Ball vs. Brandon Figueroa (men's title WBA #1)	International	(United States) Brandon Figueroa (WBA featherweight world title)
7	Snow biking	(Switzerland) 2026 UCI Snow Bike World Championships	International	France
7–8	Judo	(France) 2026 Judo Grand Slam Paris (GS #1)	International	Japan
7–9	Table Tennis	(Libya) 2026 ITTF Africa Cup	Continental	Men: (Egypt) Omar Assar; Women: (Egypt) Hana Goda
7–8 March	T20 Cricket	(India) / (Sri Lanka) 2026 Men's T20 World Cup	International	India
8	American football	(United States) Super Bowl LX	Domestic	(Washington (state)) Seattle Seahawks
8–14	Para-badminton	(Bahrain) 2026 BWF Para-Badminton World Championships	International	China
8–14	Tennis	2026 Qatar TotalEnergies Open (WTA 1000 #1)	International	(Czech Republic) Karolina Muchová
8–15	Badminton	(New Zealand) 2026 Oceania Badminton Championships	Continental	Men: (Australia) Shrey Dhand; Women: (New Zealand) Shaunna Li
8–15	Sport shooting	(Bulgaria) 2026 European Junior Shooting Championships	Continental	U18: (Individual Neutral Athletes) AIN–2 (Russia); U16: (Individual Neutral Athletes) AIN–2 (Russia)
9–12	Badminton	(Botswana) 2026 All Africa Men's and Women's Team Badminton Championships	Continental	Men: Algeria; Women: South Africa
10	Boxing	(United States) Caroline Veyre vs. Delfine Persoon (women's title WBC #1)	International	(Canada) Caroline Veyre (WBC Super-featherweight world title)
11–15	Badminton	(Turkey) 2026 European Men's and Women's Team Badminton Championships	Continental	Men: France; Women: Bulgaria
12–15	Badminton	(Guatemala) 2026 Pan Am Male & Female Badminton Cup	Continental	Men: Canada; Women: Canada
12–15	Rallying	2026 Rally Sweden (WRC #2)	International	WRC: (United Kingdom) Elfyn Evans & (United Kingdom) Scott Martin ( (Japan) Toyota Gazoo Racing WRT); WRC-2: (Finland) Roope Korhonen & (Finland) Anssi Viinikka ( (Finland) Rautio Motorsport); WRC-3: (Italy) Matteo Fontana & (Italy) Alessandro Arnaboldi
12–16	Squash	(United States) 2026 Texas Open (Gold #5)	International	Men: (France) Victor Crouin; Women: (Egypt) Nour El Sherbini
12–20 June	Rugby union	(Australia) (New Zealand) (Fiji) 2026 Super Rugby Pacific season	Continental	(New Zealand) Hurricanes
13–14	Formula racing	(Saudi Arabia) 2026 Jeddah ePrix (FE #4/5)	International	R4: (Germany) Pascal Wehrlein ( (Germany) Porsche Formula E Team); R5: (Portugal) António Félix da Costa ( (United Kingdom) Jaguar TCS Racing)
13–15	Badminton	(Botswana) 2026 African Badminton Championships	Continental	Men: (Egypt) Adham Hatem Elgamal; Women: (Uganda) Fadilah Mohamed Rafi
13–15	Chess	(Germany) FIDE Freestyle Chess World Championship 2026	International	(Norway) Magnus Carlsen
13–15	Indoor hockey	(Spain) 2026 Men's EuroHockey Indoor Club Cup	Continental	(Netherlands) Amsterdam
14	Horse racing	(Saudi Arabia) 2026 Saudi Cup	International	Horse: (Japan) Forever Young; Jockey: (Japan) Ryusei Sakai; Trainer: (Japan) Yoshito Yahagi
14 – 21 May	Association football	(India) 2026 Indian Super League season	Domestic	(West Bengal) East Bengal FC
14–15	Sailing	2026 ITM New Zealand Sail Grand Prix (SailGP #2)	International	(Australia) Bonds Flying Roos
15	Stock car racing	(United States) 2026 Daytona 500	Domestic	(United States) Tyler Reddick
15	Basketball	(United States) 2026 NBA All-Star Game	Domestic	(United States) USA Stars
15–21	Tennis	(United Arab Emirates) 2026 Dubai Tennis Championships (WTA 1000 #2)	International	(United States) Jessica Pegula
16–21	Archery	(Bulgaria) 2026 European Indoor Archery Championships	Continental	Italy
16–22	Road Cycling	(United Arab Emirates) 2026 UAE Tour (UWT #3)	International	General Classification: (Mexico) Isaac del Toro(UAE Team Emirates XRG); Points Classification: (Italy) Jonathan Milan(Lidl–Trek); Sprint Classification: (Switzerland) Silvan Dillier(Alpecin–Premier Tech); Young Rider Classification: (Mexico) Isaac del Toro(UAE Team Emirates XRG); Team Classification: UAE Team Emirates XRG
16–22	Track cycling	(Chile) 2026 Pan American Track Cycling Championships	Continental	Mexico
17–22	Snooker	(England) 2026 Players Championship (Players Series #2)	International	(China) Zhao Xintong
18–22	Volleyball	(Peru) 2026 Women's South American Volleyball Club Championship	Continental	(Brazil) SESI Bauru
19–26	Association football	(Argentina) / (Brazil) 2026 Recopa Sudamericana	Continental	(Argentina) Lanús
19–1 March	Table Tennis	Singapore Smash 2026 (Grand Smash #1)	International	Men: (China) Wang Chuqin; Women: (China) Sun Yingsha
20–22	Indoor hockey	(Poland) 2026 Women's EuroHockey Indoor Club Cup	Continental	(Belgium) Waterloo Ducks
20–27	Fencing	(Georgia (country)) 2026 European Cadets and Juniors Fencing Championships	Continental	Italy
21	Boxing	(United Kingdom) Sandy Ryan vs. Karla Ramos Zamora (women's title WBC #2)	International	(United Kingdom) Sandy Ryan (WBC light-welterweight world title)
21	Boxing	(United States) Mario Barrios vs. Ryan Garcia (men's title WBC #3)	International	(United States) Ryan Garcia (WBC Welterweight world title)
21	Boxing	(Mexico) Camila Zamorano vs. Claudia Veronica Ruiz (women's title WBC #3)	International	(Mexico) Camila Zamorano WBC atomweight world title)
21–4 October	Mountain Biking	(South Korea) / (Czech Republic) / (Austria) / (Switzerland) / (Italy) / (Andorra) / (France) / (Canada) / (United States) 2026 UCI Mountain Bike World Cup Series	International	Men's Cross-country: (France) Luca Martin; Women's Cross-country: (Sweden) Jenny Rissveds; Men's Cross-country Short-track: (France) Luca Martin; Women's Cross-country Short-track: (Switzerland) Sina Frei; Men's Downhill: (United States) Asa Vermette; Women's Downhill: (Austria) Valentina Höll; Men's Enduro: (France) Adrien Dailly; Women's Enduro: (United Kingdom) Ella Conolly; Men's Marathon: (Spain) David Valero; Women's Marathon: (Switzerland) Anna Weinbeer
21–22	Motorcycle racing	(Australia) 2026 WSBK Australian round	International	R1: (Italy) Nicolò Bulega ( (Italy) Aruba.it Racing – Ducati); SR: (Italy) Nicolò Bulega ( (Italy) Aruba.it Racing – Ducati); R2: (Italy) Nicolò Bulega ( (Italy) Aruba.it Racing – Ducati)
21–28	Softball	(Colombia) 2026 Men's Softball Pan American Championship	Continental	Mexico
22	Boxing	(United States) Claressa Shields vs. Franchon Crews-Dezurn (women's title WBC/WBO/WBA/IBF #4/2/3/2)	International	(United States) Claressa Shields (WBC/WBO/WBA/IBF heavyweight world titles)
24–3 March	Curling	(Denmark) 2026 World Junior Curling Championships	International	Men: United States; Women: South Korea
25–1 March	Volleyball	(Brazil) 2026 South American Men's Volleyball Club Championship	Continental	(Brazil) Sada Cruzeiro
27–1 March	Judo	(Uzbekistan) 2026 Judo Grand Slam Tashkent (GS #2)	International	Japan
27–1 March	Speed skating	(Germany) 2026 World Junior Speed Skating Championships	International	Kazakhstan
27–5 March	Sport shooting	(Armenia) 2026 European 10 m Events Championships	Continental	Ukraine
28–8 March	Biathlon	(Germany) Biathlon Junior World Championships 2026	International	Latvia
28–6 March	Ski orienteering	(Japan) 2026 World Ski Orienteering Championships	International	Norway
28	Road Cycling	(Belgium) 2026 Omloop Het Nieuwsblad (UWT #4)	International	(Netherlands) Mathieu van der Poel(Alpecin–Premier Tech)
28–4 October	Rugby league	(Australia) 2026 NRL season	Domestic	Sydney Roosters
28–1 March	Sailing	(Australia) 2026 KPMG Sydney Sail Grand Prix (SailGP #3)	International	(United States) US SailGP Team
28	Boxing	(United States) Emanuel Navarrete vs. Eduardo Nunez (men's title WBO/IBF #3/3)	International	(Mexico) Emanuel Navarrete (WBO/IBF Super-featherweight world titles)
28	Wrestling	(United States) RAF 06: Cejudo vs. Faber	International	(United States) Henry Cejudo
28	Road Cycling	(Belgium) 2026 Omloop Het Nieuwsblad (WWT #4)	International	(Netherlands) Demi Vollering(FDJ United–Suez)

=== March ===
Date	Sport	Venue/Event	Status	Winner/s
1	Marathon	(Japan) 2026 Tokyo Marathon (WMM #1)	International	Men: (Ethiopia) Tadese Takele; Women: (Kenya) Brigid Kosgei
1	Motorcycle racing	2026 Thailand motorcycle Grand Prix (MotoGP #1)	International	MotoGP: (Italy) Marco Bezzecchi ( (Italy) Aprilia Racing); Moto2: (Spain) Manuel González ( (Germany) Liqui Moly Dynavolt Intact GP); Moto3: (Spain) David Almansa ( (Germany) Liqui Moly Dynavolt Intact GP)
1–8	Street skateboarding	(Brazil) 2025 (2026)World Skateboarding Championship	International	Men's Street: (Japan) Toa Sasaki; Women's Street: (Japan) Ibuki Matsumoto; Men's Park: (Spain) Egoitz Bijueska; Women's Park: (United Kingdom) Sky Brown
1–21	Association football	(Australia) 2026 AFC Women's Asian Cup	Continental	Japan
2–8	Nordic skiing	(Norway) 2026 Nordic Junior World Ski Championships	International	Norway
3	Ice hockey	(Sweden) 2026 Champions Hockey League final	Continental	(Sweden) Frölunda HC
3–8	Badminton	2026 All England Open (Super 1000 #2)	International	Men: (Chinese Taipei) Lin Chun-yi; Women: (China) Wang Zhiyi
4–7	Figure skating	(Estonia) 2026 World Junior Figure Skating Championships	International	Japan
4–15	Tennis	(United States) 2026 Indian Wells Open (ATP 1000 #1 /WTA 1000 #3)	International	Men: (Italy) Jannik Sinner; Women: Aryna Sabalenka
5–6	Speed skating	(Netherlands) 2026 World Sprint Speed Skating Championships	International	Men: (Netherlands) Jenning de Boo; Women: (Netherlands) Femke Kok
5–15	Alpine skiing	(Norway) World Junior Alpine Skiing Championships 2026	International	France
5–17	Baseball	(United States) / (Puerto Rico) / (Japan) 2026 World Baseball Classic	International	Venezuela
5–26 September	Australian rules football	(Australia) 2026 AFL season	Domestic	Brisbane Lions
6–8	Judo	(Austria) 2026 Judo Grand Prix Linz (GP #1)	International	Japan
6–26 April	Track Cycling	(Australia) / (Hong Kong) / (Malaysia) 2026 UCI Track World Cup	International	China
6–14	Sailing	(Portugal) 2026 470 European Championship	Continental	(United Kingdom) Martin Wrigley & Bettine Harris
6–15	Multi-sport	(Italy) 2026 Winter Paralympics	International	China
7	Mixed martial arts	(United States) UFC 326: Holloway vs Oliveira 2	International	(Brazil) Charles Oliveira
7–8	Speed skating	(Netherlands) 2026 World Allround Speed Skating Championships	International	Men: (Norway) Sander Eitrem; Women: (Norway) Ragne Wiklund
7–22	Association football	(Ecuador) 2026 U-20 Copa Libertadores	Continental	(Chile) Santiago Wanderers
7–13	Sport shooting	(Armenia) 2026 European 10 m Events Championships	Continental	Ukraine
7	Road Cycling	(Italy) 2026 Strade Bianche (UWT #5)	International	(Slovenia) Tadej Pogačar(UAE Team Emirates XRG)
7	Road Cycling	(Italy) 2026 Strade Bianche Donne (WWT #5)	International	(Switzerland) Elise Chabbey(FDJ United–Suez)
7–8	Luge	(Germany) 2025–26 Luge World Cup Final	International	Men's Singles: (Germany) Felix Loch; Women's Singles: (Germany) Julia Taubitz; Men's Doubles: (Germany) Tobias Wendl & (Germany) Tobias Arlt; Women's Doubles: (Austria) Selina Egle & (Austria) Lara Kipp; Team Relay:Austria
8	Formula racing	(Australia) 2026 Australian Grand Prix (F1 #1)	International	(United Kingdom) George Russell ( (Germany) Mercedes)
8–15	Road Cycling	(France) 2026 Paris–Nice (UWT #6)	International	General Classification: (Denmark) Jonas Vingegaard(Visma–Lease a Bike); Points Classification: (Denmark) Jonas Vingegaard(Visma–Lease a Bike); Mountain Classification: (Denmark) Jonas Vingegaard(Visma–Lease a Bike); Young Rider Classification: (Germany) Georg Steinhauser(EF Education–EasyPost); Team Classification: INEOS Grenadiers
9–15	Wrestling	(Serbia) 2026 European U23 Wrestling Championships	Continental	Men's freestyle:Russia; Men's Greco-Roman:Russia; Women's freestyle:Belarus
9–15	Road Cycling	(Italy) 2026 Tirreno–Adriatico (UWT #7)	International	General Classification: (Mexico) Isaac del Toro(UAE Team Emirates XRG); Points Classification: (Mexico) Isaac del Toro(UAE Team Emirates XRG); Mountain Classification: (Spain) Diego Pablo Sevilla(Team Polti VisitMalta); Young Rider Classification: Isaac del Toro(UAE Team Emirates XRG); Team Classification: Red Bull–Bora–Hansgrohe
10–15	Squash	2026 Australia Open (Gold #6)	International	Men: (New Zealand) Paul Coll; Women: (Malaysia) Sivasangari Subramaniam
10–15	Table Tennis	(China) WTT Champions Chongqing 2026 (WTT Champions #2)	International	Men: (France) Félix Lebrun; Women: (Japan) Miwa Harimoto
12–13	Skeleton	(Germany) IBSF Junior World Championships Skeleton 2026	International	Germany
12–15	Golf	(United States) 2026 Players Championship	International	(United States) Cameron Young
12–15	Rallying	(Kenya) 2026 Safari Rally (WRC #3)	International	WRC: (Japan) Takamoto Katsuta & (Republic of Ireland) Aaron Johnston ( (Japan) Toyota Gazoo Racing WRT); WRC-2: (Estonia) Robert Virves & (Estonia) Jakko Viilo ( (Germany) Toksport WRT); WRC-3: (Germany) Georgios Vasilakis & (Republic of Ireland) Allan Harryman
13–14	Synchronized skating	(Poland) 2026 ISU World Junior Synchronized Skating Championships	International	(Finland) Helsinki Fintastic
13–15	3x3 basketball	(Thailand) 2026 FIBA 3x3 Champions Cup	International	Men: United States; Women: Netherlands
13–15	Short track	(Canada) 2026 World Short Track Speed Skating Championships	International	South Korea
14	Boxing	(Republic of Ireland) Anthony Cacace vs. James 'Jazza' Dickens (men's title WBA #2)	International	(Northern Ireland) Anthony Cacace (WBA Super-featherweight world title)
14	Boxing	(United States) Gabriela Fundora vs. Viviana Ruiz Corredor (women's title WBC/WBO/WBA/IBF #5/3/4/3)	International	(United States) Gabriela Fundora (WBC/WBO/WBA/IBF undisputed flyweight world championships titles)
14	Boxing	(United States) Oscar Collazo vs. Jesus Haro (men's title WBO #4)	International	(Puerto Rico) Oscar Collazo (WBO minimumweight world title)
14–22	Curling	(Canada) 2026 World Women's Curling Championship	International	Switzerland
15	Formula racing	(China) 2026 Chinese Grand Prix (F1 #2)	International	(Italy) Kimi Antonelli ( (Germany) Mercedes)
15	Nordic Combined	(Norway) 2025–26 FIS Nordic Combined World Cup Final	International	Men's Compact/Mass Start Trophy/Overall: (Austria) Johannes Lamparter; Women's Best Skier/Compact/Mass Start Trophy/Overall: (Norway) Ida Marie Hagen; Men's Best Jumper Trophy: (Austria) Thomas Rettenegger; Men's Best Skier Trophy: (Norway) Jens Lurås Oftebro; Women's Best Jumper Trophy: (Norway) Ingrid Låte
15	Road Cycling	(Italy) 2026 Trofeo Alfredo Binda-Comune di Cittiglio (WWT #6)	International	(Netherlands) Karlijn Swinkels(UAE Team ADQ)
15	Boxing	(Japan) Shokichi Iwata vs. Thammanoon Niyomtrong (men's title WBC #4)	International	(Japan) Shokichi Iwata (WBC flyweight world title)
15	Boxing	(Japan) Anthony Olascuaga vs. Jukiya Limura (men's title WBO #5)	International	(United States) Anthony Olascuaga (WBO flyweight world title)
17–6 April	Basketball	(United States) 2026 NCAA Division I men's basketball tournament	Domestic	Michigan Wolverines
18–29	Tennis	(United States) 2026 Miami Open (ATP 1000 #2 / WTA 1000 #4)	International	Men: (Italy) Jannik Sinner; Women: Aryna Sabalenka
19–22	Biathlon	(Norway) 2025–26 Biathlon World Cup Final	International	Men's Individual/Pursuit/Mass Start/Overall: (France) Éric Perrot; Women's Individual/Sprint/Pursuit/Overall: (France) Lou Jeanmonnot; Men's Sprint: (Norway) Sturla Holm Lægreid; Women's Mass Start: (France) Julia Simon; Men's Relay:Norway; Women's Relay:France; Mixed Relay:Norway
20	Boxing	(Germany) Nina Meinke vs. Dyana Vargas (women's title IBF #4)	International	(Germany) Nina Meinke (IBF featherweight world title)
20–22	cross-country skiing	(United States) 2025–26 FIS Cross-Country World Cup Final	International	Men's Distance/Sprint/Overall: (Norway) Johannes Høsflot Klæbo; Women's Distance/Overall: (United States) Jessie Diggins; Women's Sprint: (Sweden) Maja Dahlqvist; Nations Cup Overall:Norway
20–22	Judo	(Georgia (country)) 2026 Judo Grand Slam Tbilisi (GS #3)	International	Israel
20–22	Athletics	(Poland) 2026 World Athletics Indoor Championships	International	United States
20–5 April	Basketball	(United States) 2026 NCAA Division I women's basketball tournament	Domestic	(Louisiana) UCLA Bruins
21	Formula racing	(Spain) 2026 Madrid ePrix (FE #6)	International	(Portugal) António Félix da Costa ( (United Kingdom) Jaguar TCS Racing)
21	Road Cycling	(Italy) 2026 Milan–San Remo (UWT #8)	International	(Slovenia) Tadej Pogačar(UAE Team Emirates XRG)
21	Road Cycling	(Italy) 2026 Milan–San Remo Women (WWT #7)	International	(Belgium) Lotte Kopecky(Team SD Worx–Protime)
21–25	Alpine Skiing	(Norway) 2025–26 FIS Alpine Ski World Cup Final	International	Men's Downhill: (Switzerland) Marco Odermatt; Women's Downhill: (Italy) Laura Pirovano; Men's Super-G: (Switzerland) Marco Odermatt; Women's Super-G: (Italy) Sofia Goggia; Men's Giant Slalom: (Brazil) Lucas Pinheiro Braathen; Women's Giant Slalom: (Austria) Julia Scheib; Men's Slalom: (Norway) Atle Lie McGrath; Women's Slalom: (United States) Mikaela Shiffrin; Nations Cup:Switzerland(men),United States(women)
22	Motorcycle racing	(Brazil) 2026 Brazilian motorcycle Grand Prix (MotoGP #2)	International	MotoGP: (Italy) Marco Bezzecchi ( (Italy) Aprilia Racing); Moto2: (Spain) Daniel Holgado ( (Spain) CFMoto Inde Aspar Team); Moto3: (Spain) Máximo Quiles ( (Spain) CFMoto Gaviota Aspar Team)
23–29	Road Cycling	(Spain) 2026 Volta a Catalunya (UWT #9)	International	General Classification: (Denmark) Jonas Vingegaard(Visma–Lease a Bike); Points Classification: (France) Dorian Godon(INEOS Grenadiers); Mountain Classification: (Italy) Giulio Ciccone(Lidl–Trek); Young Rider Classification: (France) Lenny Martinez(Team Bahrain Victorious); Team Classification: Red Bull–Bora–Hansgrohe
24–29	Baseball	(Mexico) 2026 Baseball Champions League Americas	Continental	(United States) Kane County Cougars
24–29	Figure Skating	(Czech Republic) 2026 World Figure Skating Championships	International	Japan
24–29	Squash	(England) 2026 OptAsia Championships Gold #7)	International	Men: (Egypt) Mostafa Asal; Women: (Egypt) Hania El Hammamy
25–31	Track cycling	(Philippines) 2026 Asian Track Cycling Championships	Continental	China
25	Road Cycling	(Belgium) 2026 Tour of Bruges (UWT #10)	International	(Netherlands) Dylan Groenewegen(Unibet Rose Rockets)
26–3 May	T20 Cricket	2026 Pakistan Super League season	Domestic	(Khyber Pakhtunkhwa) Peshawar Zalmi
26–27 September	Baseball	(United States) 2026 Major League Baseball season	Domestic	
26	Road Cycling	(Belgium) 2026 Tour of Bruges Women (WWT #8)	International	(United Kingdom) Carys Lloyd(Movistar Team)
26–29	Ski Jumping	(Slovenia) 2025–26 FIS Ski Jumping World Cup Final	International	Men: (Slovenia) Domen Prevc; Women: (Slovenia) Nika Prevc; Men's Team:Austria; Mixed Team:Japan
27–31	Baseball5	(Hong Kong) 2026 Baseball5 Asia Cup	Continental	Chinese Taipei
27	Road Cycling	(Belgium) 2026 E3 Saxo Classic (UWT #11)	International	(Netherlands) Mathieu van der Poel(Alpecin–Premier Tech)
28	Endurance racing	2026 Qatar 1812 km (WEC #1)	International	Postponed until October due to the 2026 Iran war
28	Horse racing	(United Arab Emirates) 2026 Dubai World Cup	International	Horse: (United States) Magnitude; Jockey: (Puerto Rico) José Ortiz; Trainer: (United States) Steve Asmussen
28	Wrestling	(United States) RAF 07: Tsarukyan vs. Poullas 2	International	(Armenia) Arman Tsarukyan
28	Snowboarding	2025–26 FIS Snowboard World Cup Final	International	Men's Parallel Slalom: (Italy) Maurizio Bormolini; Women's Parallel Slalom: (Italy) Lucia Dalmasso; Men's Parallel Giant Slalom: (Italy) Maurizio Bormolini; Women's Parallel Giant Slalom: (Japan) Tsubaki Miki; Men's Snowboard Cross: (Germany) Leon Ulbricht; Women's Snowboard Cross: (United Kingdom) Charlotte Bankes; Men's Halfpipe: (Japan) Yūto Totsuka; Women's Halfpipe: (South Korea) Choi Ga-on; Men's Slopestyle: (China) Su Yiming; Women's Slopestyle: (United States) Lily Dhawornvej; Men's Big Air: (China) Su Yiming; Women's Big Air: (Japan) Miyabi Onitsuka; Nations cup:Italy
28	Boxing	(United States) Sebastian Fundora vs. Keith Thurman (men's title WBC #5)	International	(United States) Sebastian Fundora (WBC light-middleweight world title)
28–29	Motorcycle racing	(Portugal) 2026 WSBK Portuguese round	International	R1: (Italy) Nicolò Bulega ( (Italy) Aruba.it Racing – Ducati); SR: (Italy) Nicolò Bulega ( (Italy) Aruba.it Racing – Ducati); R2: (Italy) Nicolò Bulega ( (Italy) Aruba.it Racing – Ducati)
28–5 April	Curling	(United States) 2026 World Men's Curling Championship	International	Sweden
28–16 April	Chess	(Cyprus) Candidates Tournament 2026 (Cyprus) Women's Candidates Tournament 2026	International	Men: (Uzbekistan) Javokhir Sindarov; Women: (India) Vaishali Rameshbabu
28–18 April	Rugby union	(Belgium) / (Netherlands) / (Portugal) / (Spain) 2026 Rugby Europe Women's Championship	Continental	Spain
28- 31 April	T20 Cricket	(India) 2026 Indian Premier League season	Domestic	Royal Challengers Bengaluru
29	Motorcycle racing	(United States) 2026 Motorcycle Grand Prix of the Americas (MotoGP #3)	International	MotoGP: (Italy) Marco Bezzecchi ( (Italy) Aprilia Racing); Moto2: (Australia) Senna Agius ( (Germany) Liqui Moly Dynavolt Intact GP); Moto3: (Italy) Guido Pini ( (Luxembourg) Leopard Racing)
29	Formula racing	(Japan) 2026 Japanese Grand Prix (F1 #3)	International	(Italy) Kimi Antonelli ( (Germany) Mercedes)
29	Road Cycling	(Belgium) 2026 Gent–Wevelgem (UWT #12)	International	(Belgium) Jasper Philipsen(Alpecin–Premier Tech)
29	Road Cycling	(Belgium) 2026 Gent–Wevelgem (WWT #9)	International	(Netherlands) Lorena Wiebes(Team SD Worx–Protime)
30–5 April	Snooker	(England) 2026 Tour Championship (Players Series #3)	International	(China) Zhao Xintong
30–5 April	Table tennis	(Macau) 2026 ITTF Men's World Cup (Macau) 2026 ITTF Women's World Cup	International	Men: (China) Wang Chuqin; Women: (China) Sun Yingsha
30–10 April	Boxing	(Mongolia) 2026 Asian Boxing Elite Boxing Championships	Continental	Kazakhstan

=== April ===
Date	Sport	Venue/Event	Status	Winner/s
1–5	Ski Mountaineering	(Switzerland) 2025–26 ISMF Ski Mountaineering World Cup Final	International	Men's Individual/Vertical/Overall: (Switzerland) Rémi Bonnet; Men's Sprint: (France) Thibault Anselmet; Women's Individual: (Italy) Alba De Silvestro; Women's Sprint: (France) Margot Ravinel; Women's Vertical: (France) Axelle Gachet Mollaret; Women's Overall: (Italy) Giulia Murada
1–11	Surfing	(Australia) Rip Curl Pro Bells Beach (WSL #1)	International	Men: (Brazil) Miguel Pupo; Women: (Hawaii) Gabriela Bryan
1–5	3x3 basketball	(Singapore) 2026 FIBA 3x3 Asia Cup	Continental	Men: New Zealand; Women: Australia
1–6	Field hockey	(Netherlands) 2026 Women's Euro Hockey League	Continental	(Netherlands) SCHC
1–9	Fencing	(Brazil) 2026 Junior and Cadet Fencing World Championships	International	United States
1–18	Association football	(Thailand) 2026 AFC U-20 Women's Asian Cup	Continental	Japan
1	Road Cycling	(Belgium) 2026 Dwars door Vlaanderen (UWT #13)	International	(Italy) Filippo Ganna(INEOS Grenadiers)
1	Road Cycling	(Belgium) 2026 Dwars door Vlaanderen for Women (WWT #10)	International	(Switzerland) Marlen Reusser(Movistar Team)
2–6	Field hockey	(Netherlands) 2026 Men's Euro Hockey League Final8	Continental	(Netherlands) Kampong
2–9	Basketball	(Greece) / (Turkey) 2026 EuroCup Women final	Continental	(Turkey) ÇIMSA ÇBK Mersin
3	Boxing	(Japan) René Santiago vs. Masataka Taniguchi (men's title WBO/WBA #6/3)	International	(Puerto Rico) René Santiago (WBO & WBA light-flyweight world titles)
3 – 27 September	First-class cricket	(England) (Wales) 2026 County Championship season	Domestic	Warwickshire
4–5	Endurance racing	2026 GT World Challenge Asia (Malaysia round #1)	International	R1: (France) Alessandro Ghiretti & (China) Huang Ruohan ( (Hong Kong) No. 911 Absolute Racing); R2: (China) Lu Wei & (Belgium) Alessio Picariello ( (China) No. 4 Origine Motorsport)
4–10	Squash	(Egypt) 2026 El Gouna International (Platinum #6)	International	Men: (Peru) Diego Elías; Women: (Egypt) Hania El Hammamy
4	Boxing	(Wales) Lauren Price vs. Stephanie Pinheiro (women's title WBC/WBA/IBF #6/5/5)	International	(United Kingdom) Lauren Price (WBC,WBA & IBF Welterweight world titles)
5	Road Cycling	(Belgium) 2026 Tour of Flanders (UWT #14)	International	(Slovenia) Tadej Pogačar(UAE Team Emirates XRG)
5–12	Tennis	(Monaco) 2026 Monte-Carlo Masters	International	(Italy) Jannik Sinner
5	Road Cycling	(Belgium) 2026 Tour of Flanders (WWT #11)	International	(Netherlands) Demi Vollering(FDJ United–Suez)
5	Boxing	(United Kingdom) Caroline Dubois vs. Terri Harper (women's title WBC/WBO #7/4)	International	(United Kingdom) Caroline Dubois (WBC & WBO lightweight world titles)
5	Boxing	(United Kingdom) Chantelle Cameron vs. Michaela Kotaskova (women's title WBO #5)	International	(United Kingdom) Chantelle Cameron (WBO light-middleweight world title)
5	Boxing	(United Kingdom) Ellie Scotney vs. Mayelli Flores Rosquero (women's title WBC/WBO/WBA/IBF #8/6/6/6)	International	(United Kingdom) Ellie Scotney (WBC, WBO, WBA & IBF undisputed super-bantamweight world championships titles)
5	Boxing	(United Kingdom) Irma Garcia vs. Emma Dolan (women's title IBF #7)	International	(Mexico) Irma Garcia (IBF super-flyweight world title)
6–12	Wrestling	(Kyrgyzstan) 2026 Asian Wrestling Championships	Continental	Men's Freestyle:Iran; Men's Greco-Roman:Iran; Women's Freestyle:China
6–18	Field hockey	(Chile) 2026 Men's Junior Pan American Championship (Chile) 2026 Women's Junior Pan American Championship	Continental	Men: Argentina; Women: Argentina
6–11	Road Cycling	(Spain) 2026 Tour of the Basque Country (UWT #15)	International	General Classification: (France) Paul Seixas(Decathlon CMA CGM); Points Classification: (France) Paul Seixas(Decathlon CMA CGM); Mountain Classification: (France) Paul Seixas(Decathlon CMA CGM); Young Rider Classification: (France) Paul Seixas(Decathlon CMA CGM); Team Classification: Movistar Team
7–10	Badminton	(Peru) 2026 Pan Am Badminton Championships	Continental	Men: (Canada) Victor Lai; Women: (Canada) Michelle Li
7–12	Badminton	(China) 2026 Badminton Asia Championships	Continental	Men: (China) Shi Yuqi; Women: (South Korea) An Se-young
7–12	Badminton	(Spain) 2026 European Badminton Championships	Continental	Men: (France) Christo Popov; Women: (Scotland) Kirsty Gilmour
8–12	Climbing	(China) 2026 World Climbing Asia Championship	Continental	Japan
8–12	Gymnastics	(Portugal) 2026 European Trampoline Championships	Continental	(Individual Neutral Athletes) AIN2/Russia
8–12	Equestrian	(United States) 2026 FEI World Cup Finals (show jumping and dressage)	International	Jumping: Competition I-II: (United States) Kent Farrington; Competition III: (Germany) Richard Vogel; Dressage: All: (United Kingdom) Becky Moody
9	Boxing	(Canada) Osleys Iglesias vs. Pavel Silyagin (men's title IBF #4)	International	(Cuba) Osleys Iglesias (IBF super-middleweight world title)
9–12	Golf	(United States) 2026 Masters Tournament	International	(Northern Ireland) Rory McIlroy
9–12	Rallying	2026 Croatia Rally (WRC #4)	International	WRC: (Japan) Takamoto Katsuta & (Republic of Ireland) Aaron Johnston ( (Japan) Toyota Gazoo Racing WRT); WRC-2: (France) Yohan Rossel & (France) Arnaud Dunand ( (Italy) Lancia Corse HF); WRC-3: (Turkey) Ali Türkkan & (Turkey) Oytun Albayrak ( (Turkey) Castrol Ford Team Türkiye)
10–12	Motorcycle racing	2026 ARRC Malaysia round	International	R1: (Malaysia) Hafizh Syahrin ( (Malaysia) JDT Racing Team); R2: (Malaysia) Hafizh Syahrin ( (Malaysia) JDT Racing Team)
11	Horse racing	(United Kingdom) 2026 Grand National	International	Horse: (France) I Am Maximus; Jockey: (Republic of Ireland) Paul Townend; Trainer: (Republic of Ireland) Willie Mullins
11	Mixed martial arts	(United States) UFC 327: Procházka vs. Ulberg	International	(New Zealand) Carlos Ulberg
11–12	Sailing	(Brazil) 2026 Enel Rio Sail Grand Prix (SailGP #4)	International	(Australia) Bonds Flying Roos
11–24	Volleyball	(Egypt) 2026 CAVB Women's African Club Championship	Continental	(Egypt) Al-Ahly SC
11–17 May	Rugby union	(France) / (England) / (Republic of Ireland) / (Italy) / (Scotland) / (Wales) 2026 Women's Six Nations Championship	Continental	England
11–26 July	Gaelic football	(Republic of Ireland) 2026 All-Ireland Senior Football Championship	Domestic	(Republic of Ireland) Mayo
12	Formula racing	2026 Bahrain Grand Prix (F1) #4	International	Cancelled due to the 2026 Iran war
12	Race walking	(Brazil) 2026 World Athletics Race Walking Team Championships	International	China
12	Road Cycling	(France) 2026 Paris–Roubaix (UWT #16)	International	(Belgium) Wout van Aert(Visma–Lease a Bike)
12–17	Taekwondo	(Uzbekistan) 2026 World Junior Taekwondo Championships	International	Men:Iran; Women:China; Overall:Iran
12–25	Multi-sport	(Panama) 2026 South American Youth Games	Continental	Brazil
12	Road Cycling	(France) 2026 Paris–Roubaix Femmes (WWT #12)	International	(Germany) Franziska Koch(FDJ United–Suez)
15–19	Basketball	(Spain) 2026 EuroLeague Women Final Six	Continental	(Turkish Basketball Federation) Fenerbahçe Opet
16–19	Judo	(China) 2026 Asian Judo Championships	Continental	Mongolia
16–19	Judo	(Georgia (country)) 2026 European Judo Championships	Continental	Georgia
16–19	Judo	(Panama) 2026 Pan American Judo Championships	Continental	Brazil
16–26	Surfing	Western Australia Margaret River Pro (WSL #2)	International	Men: (Australia) George Pittar; Women: (United States) Lakey Peterson
17–7 June	Rugby 7s	(Hong Kong) / (Spain) / (France) 2025–26 SVNS Grand Finals	International	Men:South Africa; Women:Australia
17	Boxing	(United States) Alycia Baumgardner vs. Bo Mi Re Shin (women's title WBO/WBA/IBF #7/7/8)	International	(United States) Alycia Baumgardner (WBO, WBA & IBF Super-featherweight world titles)
17	Boxing	(United States) Lani Daniels vs. Shadasia Green (women's title WBO/IBF #8/9)	International	(New Zealand) Lani Daniels (WBO & IBF super-middleweight world titles)
18	Wrestling	(United States) RAF 08: Tsarukyan vs. Faber	International	(Armenia) Arman Tsarukyan
18	Association football	(Spain) 2026 Copa del Rey final	Domestic	(Basque Country (autonomous community)) Real Sociedad
18–19	Motorcycle racing	(Netherlands) 2026 WSBK Dutch round	International	R1: (Italy) Nicolò Bulega ( (Italy) Aruba.it Racing – Ducati); SR: (Italy) Nicolò Bulega ( (Italy) Aruba.it Racing – Ducati); R2: (Italy) Nicolò Bulega ( (Italy) Aruba.it Racing – Ducati)
18–4 May	Snooker	(England) 2026 World Snooker Championship	International	(China) Wu Yize
18–14 June	Ice hockey	(United States) (Canada) 2026 Stanley Cup playoffs	Domestic	(North Carolina) Carolina Hurricanes
18 -19 July	Hurling	(Republic of Ireland) 2026 All-Ireland Senior Hurling Championship	Domestic	(Republic of Ireland) Limerick
19	Endurance racing	(Italy) 2026 6 Hours of Imola (WEC #1)	International	Hypercar: (Switzerland) Sébastien Buemi, (New Zealand) Brendon Hartley & (Japan) Ryo Hirakawa ( (Japan) Toyota Racing); LMGT3: (United Kingdom) Dan Harper, (United States) Anthony McIntosh & (Canada) Parker Thompson ( (Belgium) Team WRT)
19	Formula racing	(Saudi Arabia) 2026 Saudi Arabian Grand Prix (F1) #5	International	Cancelled due to the 2026 Iran war
19	Association football	(Netherlands) 2026 KNVB Cup final	Domestic	(North Holland) AZ Alkmaar
19–26	Weightlifting	(Georgia (country)) 2026 European Weightlifting Championships	Continental	Armenia
19	Road Cycling	(Netherlands) 2026 Amstel Gold Race (UWT #17)	International	(Belgium) Remco Evenepoel(Red Bull–Bora–Hansgrohe)
19	Road Cycling	(Netherlands) 2026 Amstel Gold Race (WWT #13)	International	(Spain) Paula Blasi(UAE Team ADQ)
20	Marathon	(United States) 2026 Boston Marathon (WMM #2)	International	Men: (Kenya) John Korir; Women: (Kenya) Sharon Lokedi
20–26	Kempo	(Turkey) 2026 IKF World Kempo Championship	International	
20–26	Wrestling	(Albania) 2026 European Wrestling Championships	Continental	Men's freestyle:Russia(competed under UWW); Men's Greco-Roman:Russia(competed under UWW); Women's freestyle:Ukraine
20–3 May	Volleyball	(Rwanda) 2026 CAVB African Volleyball Club Championships	Continental	(Egypt) Al-Ahly
21–26	Squash	(Switzerland) 2026 Grasshopper Cup (Gold #8)	International	Men: (Egypt) Karim Gawad; Women: (Malaysia) Sivasangari Subramaniam
22–29	Basketball	(Greece) / (Spain) 2026 FIBA Europe Cup Finals	Continental	(Spain) Surne Bilbao Basket
22–30	Multi-sport	(China) 2026 Asian Beach Games	Continental	China
22–1 May	Basketball	(Turkey) / (France) 2026 EuroCup Finals	Continental	(France) Cosea JL Bourg
22–2 May	Ice hockey	(Slovakia) 2026 IIHF World U18 Championships	International	Sweden
22–3 May	Tennis	(Spain) 2026 Madrid Open (ATP 1000 #3 /WTA 1000 #5)	International	Men: (Italy) Jannik Sinner; Women: (Ukraine) Marta Kostyuk
22	Road Cycling	(Belgium) 2026 La Flèche Wallonne (UWT #18)	International	(France) Paul Seixas(Decathlon CMA CGM)
22	Road Cycling	(Belgium) 2026 La Flèche Wallonne Femmes (WWT #14)	International	(Netherlands) Demi Vollering(FDJ United–Suez)
23–25	American football	(United States) 2026 NFL draft	Domestic	Fernando Mendoza ( Indiana)
23–26	Golf	(United States) 2026 Chevron Championship	International	(United States) Nelly Korda
23–26	Rallying	(Spain) 2026 Rally Islas Canarias (WRC #5)	International	WRC: (France) Sébastien Ogier & (France) Vincent Landais ( (Japan) Toyota Gazoo Racing WRT); WRC-2: (France) Yohan Rossel & (France) Arnaud Dunand ( (Italy) Lancia Corse HF); WRC-3: (Spain) Gil Membrado & (Spain) Adrián Pérez
24–27	Beach Handball	(Togo) 2026 African Beach Handball Championship	Continental	Men:Tunisia; Women:Benin
24–3 May	Badminton	(Denmark) 2026 Thomas & Uber Cup	International	Men: China; Women: South Korea
25	Association football	(Saudi Arabia) 2026 AFC Champions League Elite final	Continental	(Saudi Arabia) Al-Ahli
25–1 May	Association football	(Sweden) 2026 UEFA Women's Europa Cup final	Continental	(Sweden) BK Häcken
25–2 May	Curling	(Switzerland) 2026 World Mixed Doubles Curling Championship	International	Australia
25–3 May	Softball	(Colombia) 2026 U-23 Men's Softball World Cup	International	Japan
26	Marathon	(United Kingdom) 2026 London Marathon (WMM #3)	International	Men: (Kenya) Sabastian Sawe; Women: (Ethiopia) Tigst Assefa
26	Motorcycle racing	(Spain) 2026 Spanish motorcycle Grand Prix (MotoGP #4)	International	MotoGP: (Spain) Álex Márquez ( (Italy) BK8 Gresini Racing MotoGP); Moto2: (Australia) Senna Agius ( (Germany) Liqui Moly Dynavolt Intact GP); Moto3: (Spain) Máximo Quiles ( (Spain) CFMoto Aspar Team)
26	Road Cycling	(Belgium) 2026 Liège–Bastogne–Liège (UWT #19)	International	(Slovenia) Tadej Pogačar(UAE Team Emirates XRG)
26–30	Volleyball	(South Korea) 2026 AVC Women's Volleyball Champions League	Continental	(Japan) NEC Red Rockets
26	Road Cycling	(Belgium) 2026 Liège–Bastogne–Liège Femmes (WWT #15)	International	(Netherlands) Demi Vollering(FDJ United–Suez)
27–30	Weightlifting	(Panama) 2026 Pan American Weightlifting Championships	Continental	United States
27–1 May	Weightlifting	(Samoa) 2026 Oceania Weightlifting Championships (Samoa) 2026 Oceania Junior Weightlifting Championships (Samoa) 2026 Oceania Youth Weightlifting Championships	Continental	Samoa
27–3 May	Ice hockey	(Kyrgyzstan) 2026 IIHF U18 Asia Cup	Continental	Uzbekistan
27–9 May	Rugby union	(South Africa) 2026 U20 Rugby Championship	International	South Africa
28–10 May	Table tennis	(England) 2026 World Team Table Tennis Championships	International	Men: China; Women: China
28–3 May	Road Cycling	(Switzerland) 2026 Tour de Romandie (UWT #20)	International	General Classification: (Slovenia) Tadej Pogačar(UAE Team Emirates XRG); Points Classification: (Slovenia) Tadej Pogačar(UAE Team Emirates XRG); Mountain Classification: (Switzerland) Roland Thalmann(Tudor Pro Cycling Team); Young Rider Classification: (France) Lenny Martinez(Team Bahrain Victorious); Team Classification: Red Bull–Bora–Hansgrohe Rookies
30–2 May	Rhythmic gymnastics	(South Africa) 2026 African Rhythmic Gymnastics Championships	Continental	Egypt
30–3 May	Rhythmic gymnastics	(Azerbaijan) 2026 Rhythmic Gymnastics European Cup	Continental	(Individual Neutral Athletes) ANA
30–20 May	Ice hockey	(United States) (Canada) 2026 Walter Cup playoffs	Domestic	(Quebec) Montreal Victoire

=== May ===
Date	Sport	Venue/Event	Status	Winner/s
1–3	Climbing	(China) 2026 World Climbing Series (WCS #1)	International	Men's Bouldering: (Japan) Sorato Anraku; Women's Bouldering: (France) Zélia Avezou
1–3	Judo	(Tajikistan) 2026 Judo Grand Slam Dushanbe (GS #4)	International	Russia
1–17	Association football	(China) 2026 AFC U-17 Women's Asian Cup	Continental	North Korea
1	Road Cycling	(Germany) 2026 Eschborn–Frankfurt (UWT #21)	International	(Germany) Georg Zimmermann(Lotto–Intermarché)
2	Boxing	(Japan) Naoya Inoue vs. Junto Nakatani (men's title WBA/WBC/WBO/IBF #4/6/7/5)	International	(Japan) Naoya Inoue (WBA, WBC, WBO & IBF undisputed Super-bantamweight world championship titles)
2	Boxing	(Japan) Takuma Inoue vs. Kazuto Loka (men's title WBC #7)	International	(Japan) Takuma Inoue (WBC bantamweight world title)
2	Boxing	(United States) David Benavidez vs. Gilberto Ramirez (men's title WBO #8)	International	(United States) David Benavidez (WBO cruiserweight world title)
2	Horse racing	(United States) 2026 Kentucky Derby	International	Horse: (United States) Golden Tempo; Jockey: (Puerto Rico) José Ortiz; Trainer: (United States) Cherie DeVaux
2–3	Athletics	(Botswana) 2026 World Athletics Relays	International	Jamaica
2–3	Endurance racing	2026 GT World Challenge Asia (Indonesia round #2)	International	R1: (China) Franky Cheng Congfu & (China) James Yu Kuai ( (Hong Kong) No. 16 FAW Audi Sport Asia Team Phantom); R2: (Netherlands) Loek Hartog & (China) Anthony Liu Xu ( (Hong Kong) No. 37 Phantom Global Racing)
2–3	Formula Racing	(Germany) 2026 Berlin ePrix (FE #7/8)	International	R7: (Switzerland) Nico Müller ( (Germany) Porsche Formula E Team); R8: (New Zealand) Mitch Evans ( (United Kingdom) Jaguar TCS Racing)
2–3	Motorcycle racing	(Hungary) 2026 WSBK Hungarian round	International	R1: (Italy) Nicolò Bulega ( (Italy) Aruba.it Racing – Ducati); SR: (Italy) Nicolò Bulega ( (Italy) Aruba.it Racing – Ducati); R2: (Italy) Nicolò Bulega ( (Italy) Aruba.it Racing – Ducati)
2–3	Volleyball	(Turkey) 2026 CEV Women's Champions League Final Four	Continental	(Turkey) VakifBank Istanbul
2–8	Weightlifting	(Egypt) 2026 World Junior Weightlifting Championships	International	China
2–12	Surfing	(Australia) Bonsoy Gold Coast Pro (WSL #3)	International	Men: (Australia) Ethan Ewing; Women: (Australia) Stephanie Gilmore
3	Formula racing	(United States) 2026 Miami Grand Prix (F1 #4)	International	(Italy) Kimi Antonelli ( (Germany) Mercedes)
3–9	Road Cycling	(Spain) 2026 La Vuelta Femenina (WWT #16)	International	General Classification: (Spain) Paula Blasi(UAE Team ADQ); Points Classification: (Belgium) Lotte Kopecky(Team SD Worx–Protime); Mountain Classification: (Spain) Paula Blasi(UAE Team ADQ); Young Rider Classification: (France) Marion Bunel(Visma–Lease a Bike); Team Classification: Team SD Worx–Protime
4–17	Association football	(Northern Ireland) 2026 UEFA Women's Under-17 Championship	Continental	Germany
5–10	Curling	(Canada) 2026 World Junior Mixed Doubles Curling Championship	International	Japan
5–10	Swimming	(Algeria) 2026 African Swimming Championships	Continental	Senior: Egypt; Junior: South Africa
5–17	Tennis	(Italy) 2026 Italian Open (ATP 1000 #4/ WTA 1000 #6)	International	Men: (Italy) Jannik Sinner; Women: (Ukraine) Elina Svitolina
5–22	Association football	(Saudi Arabia) 2026 AFC U-17 Asian Cup	Continental	Japan
6–10	Floorball	(Italy) 2026 Women's U-19 World Floorball Championships	International	Finland
7–9	Basketball	(Spain) 2026 Basketball Champions League Final Four	Continental	(Lithuanian Basketball Federation) Rytas
7–10	Wrestling	(United States) 2026 Pan American Wrestling Championships	Continental	Men's Freestyle:United States; Men's Greco-Roman:United States; Women's Freestyle:United States
7–10	Rallying	2026 Rally de Portugal (WRC #6)	International	R1: (Belgium) Thierry Neuville & (Belgium) Martijn Wydaeghe ( (South Korea) Hyundai Shell Mobis WRT); SR: (Finland) Teemu Suninen & (Finland) Janni Hussi; R2: (Italy) Matteo Fontana & (Italy) Alessandro Arnaboldi
8–10	Climbing	(China) 2026 World Climbing Series (WCS#2)	International	Men's Lead: (Japan) Neo Suzuki; Women's Lead: (United States) Annie Sanders; Men's Speed: (China) Zhao Yicheng; Women's Speed: (Poland) Aleksandra Kałucka
8–10	Futsal	(Italy) 2026 UEFA Futsal Champions League Finals	Continental	(Portuguese Football Federation) Sporting CP
8–10	Judo	(Kazakhstan) 2026 Judo Grand Slam Astana (GS #5)	International	Russia
8–10	Motorcycle racing	2026 ARRC Thailand round	International	R1: (Malaysia) Hafizh Syahrin ( (Malaysia) JDT Racing Team); R2: (Malaysia) Hafizh Syahrin ( (Malaysia) JDT Racing Team)
8–16	Squash	(Egypt) 2026 Men's World Squash Championship (Egypt) 2026 Women's World Squash Championship	International	Men: (Egypt) Mostafa Asal; Women: (Egypt) Amina Orfi
8-31	Road Cycling	(Italy) 2026 Giro d'Italia (UWT #22)	International	General Classification: (Denmark) Jonas Vingegaard(Visma–Lease a Bike); Points Classification: (France) Paul Magnier(Visma–Lease a Bike); Mountain Classification: (Italy) Giulio Ciccone(Lidl–Trek); Young Rider Classification: (Portugal) Afonso Eulálio(Team Bahrain Victorious); Team Classification: Visma–Lease a Bike
8–31 October	Basketball	(United States) 2026 WNBA season (United States) 2026 WNBA Playoffs	Domestic	Regular Season: Minnesota Lynx; Playoffs/Final: (California) Golden State Valkyries
9	Endurance racing	(Belgium) 2026 6 Hours of Spa-Francorchamps (WEC #2)	International	Hypercar: (Belgium) René Rast, (Netherlands) Robin Frijns & (South Africa) Sheldon van der Linde ( (Germany) BMW M Team WRT); LMGT3: (Hong Kong) Antares Au, (United Kingdom) Tom Fleming & (Germany) Marvin Kirchhöfer ( (United Kingdom) Garage 59)
9	Boxing	(United Kingdom) Daniel Dubois vs. Fabio Wardley (men's title WBO #9)	International	(United Kingdom) Daniel Dubois (WBO heavyweight world title)
9	Mixed martial arts	(United States) UFC 328: Chimaev vs. Strickland	International	(United States) Sean Strickland
9–16	Association football	(Algeria) / (Egypt) 2026 CAF Confederation Cup final	Continental	(Algerian Football Federation) USM Alger
10- 8 November	Association football	(Republic of Ireland) 2026 FAI Cup season	Domestic	
10–11	Sailing	2026 Apex Group Bermuda Sail Grand Prix (SailGP #5)	International	(Australia) Bonds Flying Roos
10	Motorcycle racing	(France) 2026 French motorcycle Grand Prix (MotoGP #5)	International	MotoGP: (Spain) Jorge Martín ( (Italy) Aprilia Racing); Moto2: (Spain) Izan Guevara ( (Italy) Blu Cru Pramac Yamaha Moto2); Moto3: (Spain) Máximo Quiles ( (Spain) CFMoto Gaviota Aspar Team)
10	Association football	2026 Coupe de France Féminine final	Domestic	(Auvergne-Rhône-Alpes) OL Lyonnes
11–14	Taekwondo	(Germany) 2026 European Taekwondo Championships	Continental	Men:Spain; Women:Turkey; Overall:Turkey
11–17	Weightlifting	(India) 2026 Asian Weightlifting Championships	Continental	China
12–16	Handball	(United States) 2026 Nor.Ca. Men's Handball Championship	Continental	United States
12–16	Weightlifting	(Egypt) 2026 African Weightlifting Championships	Continental	Egypt
12–17	Athletics	(Ghana) 2026 African Championships in Athletics	Continental	South Africa
12–19	Snooker	(China) 2026 World Women's Snooker Championship	International	(Thailand) Panchaya Channoi
13	Association football	(Kuwait) 2026 AFC Challenge League final	Continental	Al Kuwait
13	Association football	(Italy) 2026 Coppa Italia final	Domestic	(Lombardy) Inter Milan
13–17	Volleyball	(Indonesia) 2026 AVC Men's Volleyball Champions League	Continental	(Indonesia) Jakarta Bhayangkara Presisi
13–2 June	Association football	(Morocco) 2026 U-17 Africa Cup of Nations	Continental	Senegal
14	Association football	(Germany) 2026 DFB-Pokal der Frauen final	Domestic	(Bavaria) FC Bayern München
14–17	Golf	(United States) 2026 PGA Championship	International	(England) Aaron Rai
15–31	Ice Hockey	(Switzerland) 2026 IIHF World Championship	International	Finland
15–17	Road Cycling	(Spain) 2026 Itzulia Women (WWT #17)	International	General Classification: (Netherlands) Mischa Bredewold(Team SD Worx–Protime); Points Classification: (Netherlands) Mischa Bredewold(Team SD Worx–Protime); Mountain Classification: (Netherlands) Yara Kastelijn(Fenix–Premier Tech); Young Rider Classification: (France) Ema Comte(Cofidis); Team Classification: FDJ United–Suez
15–25	Surfing	Corona Cero New Zealand Pro (WSL #4)	International	Men: (Brazil) Ítalo Ferreira; Women: (Hawaii) Carissa Moore
16	Association football	(Saudi Arabia) 2026 AFC Champions League Two final	Continental	(Japan Football Association) Gamba Osaka
16	Association football	(England) 2026 FA Cup final	Domestic	(Greater Manchester) Manchester City
16	Association football	(Netherlands) 2026 KNVB Women's Cup final	Domestic	(Overijssel) FC Twente Vrouwen
16	Association football	(Spain) 2026 Copa de la Reina de Fútbol final	Domestic	(Catalonia) FC Barcelona Femení
16	Horse racing	(United States) 2026 Preakness Stakes	Domestic	Horse: (United States) Napoleon Solo; Jockey: (Mexico) Paco Lopez; Trainer: (United States) Chad Summers
16	Mixed martial arts	(United States) MVP MMA: Rousey vs. Carano	International	(United States) Ronda Rousey
16–17	Formula Racing	2026 Monaco ePrix (FE #9/10)	International	R9: (Netherlands) Nyck de Vries ( (India) Mahindra Racing); R10: (United Kingdom) Oliver Rowland ( (Japan) Nissan Formula E Team)
16–17	Motorcycle racing	(Czech Republic) 2026 WSBK Czech round	International	R1: (Italy) Nicolò Bulega ( (Italy) Aruba.it Racing – Ducati); SR: (Italy) Nicolò Bulega ( (Italy) Aruba.it Racing – Ducati); R2: (Italy) Nicolò Bulega ( (Italy) Aruba.it Racing – Ducati)
16–17	Volleyball	(Italy) 2026 CEV Champions League Final Four	Continental	(Italy) Sir Sicoma Monini Perugia
16–23	Sepak takraw	(Malaysia) TM ISTAF Sepaktakraw World Cup 2026	International	Malaysia
16–9 August	Camogie	(Republic of Ireland) 2026 All-Ireland Senior Camogie Championship	Domestic	(County Cork) Cork
17	Motorcycle racing	(Catalonia) 2026 Catalan motorcycle Grand Prix (MotoGP #6)	International	MotoGP: (Italy) Fabio Di Giannantonio ( (Italy) Pertamina Enduro VR46 Racing Team); Moto2: (Spain) Manuel González ( (Germany) Liqui Moly Dynavolt Intact GP); Moto3: (Spain) Máximo Quiles ( (Spain) CFMoto Gaviota Aspar Team)
17–24	Association football	(South Africa) / (Morocco) 2026 CAF Champions League final	Continental	(South Africa) Mamelodi Sundowns
18–24	Archery	(Turkey) 2026 European Archery Championships	Continental	Turkey
20	Association football	(Turkey) 2026 UEFA Europa League final	Continental	(The Football Association) Aston Villa
20–24	Karate	(Germany) 2026 European Karate Championships	Continental	Italy
21–24	Road Cycling	(Spain) 2026 Vuelta a Burgos Feminas (WWT #18)	International	General Classification: (Netherlands) Yara Kastelijn(Fenix–Premier Tech); Points Classification: (Netherlands) Lorena Wiebes(Team SD Worx–Protime); Mountain Classification: (Netherlands) Yara Kastelijn(Fenix–Premier Tech); Young Rider Classification: (Netherlands) Shirin van Anrooij(Lidl–Trek); Team Classification): Liv AlUla Jayco
21–24	Taekwondo	(Mongolia) 2026 Asian Taekwondo Championships	Continental	Men:Iran; Women:China; Overall:Iran
22–24	Basketball	(Greece) 2026 EuroLeague Final Four	Continental	(Greece) Olympiacos
22–24	Climbing	(Switzerland) 2026 World Climbing Series (WCS#3)	International	Men's Bouldering: (Japan) Sorato Anraku; Women's Bouldering: (Australia) Oceania Mackenzie
22 – 18 July	T20 Cricket	(England) (Wales) 2026 T20 Blast season	Domestic	Northamptonshire Steelbacks
22	Association football	2026 Coupe de France final	Domestic	(Pas-de-Calais) RC Lens
22	Association football	(Turkey) 2026 Turkish Cup final	Domestic	(Turkey) Trabzonspor
23	Association football	(Norway) 2026 UEFA Women's Champions League final	Continental	(Spain) Barcelona
23	Association football	(Mexico) 2026 CONCACAF W Champions Cup final	Continental	(Mexico) América
23	Association football	(South Korea) 2026 AFC Women's Champions League final	Continental	(North Korea) Naegohyang
23	Rugby union	(Spain) 2026 European Rugby Champions Cup final	Continental	(France) Bordeaux Bègles
23–24	Rowing	(Germany) 2026 European Rowing U19 Championships	Continental	Italy
23–26	Rhythmic gymnastics	(Kyrgyzstan) 2026 Asian Rhythmic Gymnastics Championships	Continental	Uzbekistan
23–31	Rugby union	(Kenya) 2026 Rugby Africa Women's Cup	Continental	South Africa
23	Association football	(Scotland) 2026 Scottish Cup final	Domestic	(Glasgow) Celtic
23	Association football	(Germany) 2026 DFB-Pokal final	Domestic	(Bavaria) FC Bayern München
23–25	Field hockey	(Netherlands) 2026 Men's and Women's Hoofdklasse Hockey finals	Domestic	Men: (South Holland) HC Rotterdam; Women: (North Holland) Amsterdamsche
23	Boxing	(Egypt) Oleksandr Usyk vs. Rico Verhoeven (men's title WBC #8)	International	(Ukraine) Oleksandr Usyk (WBC heavyweight world title)
23	Boxing	(Egypt) Hamzah Sheeraz vs. Alem Begic (men's title WBO #10)	International	(United Kingdom) Hamzah Sheeraz (WBO super-middleweight world title)
23	Boxing	(Egypt) Mizuki Hiruta vs. Mai Soliman (women's title WBO #9)	International	(Japan) Mizuki Hiruta (WBO super-flyweight world title)
24	Formula racing	(Canada) 2026 Canadian Grand Prix (F1 #5)	International	(Italy) Kimi Antonelli ( (Germany) Mercedes)
24–7 June	Tennis	(France) 2026 French Open (Grand Slam #2)	International	Men: (Germany) Alexander Zverev; Women: Mirra Andreeva
24–31	Futsal	(Brazil) 2026 Copa Libertadores de Futsal	Continental	(Brazilian Football Confederation) Carlos Barbosa
24	Association football	(Italy) 2026 Coppa Italia Femminile final	Domestic	(Lazio) AS Roma
24	Fencing	2025–26 Fencing World Cup Finals	International	Men's Foil: (Czech Republic) Alexander Choupenitch; Men's Sabre: (France) Sébastien Patrice; Men's Épée: (Egypt) Mohamed El-Sayed; Women's Foil: (Italy) Martina Favaretto; Women's Sabre: (Russia) Yana Egorian; Women's Épée: (Italy) Alberta Santuccio
25–5 June	Association football	(India) 2026 SAFF Women's Championship	Continental	India
25–7 June	Association football	(Estonia) 2026 UEFA European Under-17 Championship	Continental	Italy
26–31	Badminton	2026 Singapore Open (Super 750 #2)	International	Men: (France) Alex Lanier; Women: (South Korea) An Se-young
27	Association football	(Germany) 2026 UEFA Conference League final	Continental	(The Football Association) Crystal Palace
27–31	Gymnastics	(Bulgaria) 2026 Rhythmic Gymnastics European Championships	Continental	Bulgaria
28–31	Climbing	(Spain) 2026 World Climbing Series (WCS#4)	International	Men's Bouldering: (Japan) Sorato Anraku; Women's Bouldering: (United Kingdom) Erin McNeice; Men's Speed: (China) Chu Shouhong; Women's Speed: (United States) Emma Hunt
28–31	Rallying	2026 Rally Japan (WRC #7)	International	WRC: (United Kingdom) Elfyn Evans & (United Kingdom) Scott Martin ( (Japan) Toyota Gazoo Racing WRT); WRC-2: (Bulgaria) Nikolay Gryazin & (Kyrgyzstan) Konstantin Aleksandrov; WRC-3: (France) Ghjuvanni Rossi & (France) Kylian Sarmezan
30	Association football	(Hungary) 2026 UEFA Champions League final	Continental	(French Football Federation) Paris Saint-Germain
30	Association football	(Mexico) 2026 CONCACAF Champions Cup final	Continental	(Mexico) Toluca
30	Boxing	(Russia) Dmitry Bivol vs. Michael Eifert (men's title WBA/WBO/IBF #5/11/6)	International	(Russia) Dmitry Bivol (WBA, WBO & IBF light-heavyweight world titles)
30	Boxing	(United States) Amanda Serrano vs. Cheyenne Hanson (women's title WBA/WBO #8/10)	International	(United States) Amanda Serrano (WBA & WBO featherweight world titles)
30	Boxing	(United States) Stephanie Han vs Holly Holm (women's title WBA # 9)	International	(United States) Stephanie Han (WBA lightweight world title)
30	Boxing	(United States) Desley Robinson vs. Mary Spencer (women's title WBO/IBF #11/10)	International	(Australia) Desley Robinson (WBO & IBF middleweight world titles)
30	Boxing	(United States) Lourdes Juarez vs. Yokasta Valle (women's title WBC #9)	International	(Mexico) Lourdes Juarez (WBC strawweight world title)
30	Wrestling	(United States) RAF 09: Steveson vs. Romanov	International	(United States) Gable Steveson
30–31	Motorcycle racing	2026 WSBK Aragon round	International	R1: (Italy) Nicolò Bulega ( (Italy) Aruba.it Racing – Ducati); SR: (Italy) Nicolò Bulega ( (Italy) Aruba.it Racing – Ducati); R2: (Italy) Nicolò Bulega ( (Italy) Aruba.it Racing – Ducati)
30–7 June	Road Cycling	(Italy) 2026 Giro d'Italia Women (WWT #19)	International	General Classification: (Netherlands) Demi Vollering(FDJ United–Suez); Points Classification: (Italy) Elisa Balsamo(Lidl–Trek); Mountain Classification: (Netherlands) Demi Vollering(FDJ United–Suez); Young Rider Classification: (Canada) Isabella Holmgren(Lidl–Trek); Team Classification: Lidl–Trek
30–7 June	Squash	(England) 2026 Quilter Chevlot British Open (Diamond #2)	International	Men: (New Zealand) Paul Coll; Women: (Egypt) Amina Orfi
31	Association football	(England) 2026 Women's FA Cup final	Domestic	(Greater Manchester) Manchester City
31	Association football	(Scotland) 2026 Scottish Women's Cup final	Domestic	(Glasgow) Celtic
31	T20 Cricket	(India) 2026 Indian Premier League final	Domestic	(Karnataka) Royal Challengers Bengaluru
31	Motorcycle racing	(Italy) 2026 Italian motorcycle Grand Prix (MotoGP #7)	International	MotoGP: (Italy) Marco Bezzecchi ( (Italy) Aprilia Racing); Moto2: (Spain) Manuel González ( (Germany) Liqui Moly Dynavolt Intact GP); Moto3: (Spain) Brian Uriarte ( (Finland) Red Bull KTM Ajo)
31–1 June	Sailing	(United States) 2026 Mubadala New York Sail Grand Prix (SailGP #6)	International	(Australia) Bonds Flying Roos
31–7	Gymnastics	(Brazil) 2026 Pan American Rhythmic Gymnastics Championships	Continental	Brazil

=== June ===
Date	Sport	Venue/Event	Status	Winner/s
1–5	Fencing	(Ivory Coast) 2026 African Fencing Championships	Continental	Egypt
1–7	3x3 basketball	(Poland) 2026 FIBA 3x3 World Cup	International	Men: Latvia; Women: United States
1–7	Basketball	(Mexico) 2026 FIBA U18 AmeriCup	Continental	Canada
2–7	Badminton	2026 Indonesia Open (Super 1000 #3)	International	Men: (Canada) Victor Lai; Women: (South Korea) An Se-young
3–7	Climbing	(Czech Republic) 2026 World Climbing Series (WCS#5)	International	Men's Bouldering: (Japan) Sorato Anraku; Women's Bouldering: (United States) Annie Sanders; Men's Lead: (Indonesia) Putra Tri Ramadani; Women's Lead: (United States) Annie Sanders
3–13	Basketball	(United States) 2026 NBA Finals	Domestic	(New York (state)) New York Knicks
3–26 July	Volleyball	(China) (Macau) 2026 FIVB Women's Volleyball Nations League	International	Turkey
4–7	Golf	(United States) 2026 U.S. Women's Open	International	(United States) Nelly Korda
4–7	Taekwondo	(Italy) Rome 2026 World Taekwondo Grand Prix (GP #1)	International	Men:Italy & Russia; Women:Russia; Overall:Russia
5–6	Endurance racing	(China) 2026 GT World Challenge Asia (Shanghai round #3)	International	R1: (China) Chen Weian & (Hong Kong) Liu Kaishun ( (Hong Kong) No. 96 Harmony Racing); R2: (Germany) Laurin Heinrich & (China) Lu Wei ( (China) No. 11 Origine Motorsport)
5–15	Surfing	Surf City El Salvador Pro (WSL #5)	International	Men: (Italy) Leonardo Fioravanti; Women: (Hawaii) Carissa Moore
6	Boxing	(Japan) Masamichi Yabuki vs. Rene Calixto (men's title IBF #7)	International	(Japan) Masamichi Yabuki (IBF flyweight world title)
6	Boxing	(Japan) Andrew Moloney vs. Willibaldo Garcia (men's title IBF #8)	International	(Australia) Andrew Moloney (IBF super-flyweight world title)
6	Horse Racing	(United States) 2026 Belmont Stakes	International	Horse: (United States) Golden Tempo; Jockey: (Puerto Rico) José Ortiz; Trainer: (United States) Cherie DeVaux
6–7	Handball	(Hungary) 2026 Women's EHF Champions League final 4	Continental	(France) Metz Handball
6–14	Volleyball	(Philippines) 2026 AVC Women's Volleyball Cup	Continental	South Korea
6–2 August	Gaelic football	(Republic of Ireland) 2026 All-Ireland Senior Ladies' Football Championship	Domestic	(Republic of Ireland) Galway
7	Formula racing	2026 Monaco Grand Prix (F1) #8	International	(Italy) Kimi Antonelli ( (Germany) Mercedes)
7	Motorcycle racing	(Hungary) 2026 Hungarian motorcycle Grand Prix (MotoGP #8)	International	MotoGP: (Spain) Marc Márquez ( (Italy) Ducati Lenovo Team); Moto2: (Spain) Manuel González ( (Germany) Liqui Moly Dynavolt Intact GP); Moto3: (Spain) Máximo Quiles ( (Italy) CFMoto Aspar Team)
7–14	Road Cycling	(France) 2026 Tour Auvergne-Rhône-Alpes (UWT #23)	International	General Classification: (Mexico) Isaac del Toro(UAE Team Emirates XRG); Points Classification: (Israel) Nadav Raisberg(NSN Cycling Team); Mountain Classification: (France) Clément Braz Afonso(Groupama–FDJ United); Young Rider Classification: (Mexico) Isaac del Toro(UAE Team Emirates XRG); Team Classification: Visma–Lease a Bike
9–15	Basketball	(Mexico) 2026 FIBA U18 Women's AmeriCup	Continental	United States
10–14	Canoeing	(Portugal) 2026 Canoe Sprint European Championships	Continental	Hungary
10–2 August	Volleyball	(China) 2026 FIVB Men's Volleyball Nations League	International	Poland
11–14	Baseball	(Guatemala) 2026 Central American Baseball Cup	Continental	Guatemala
11–19 July	Association football	(Mexico) (Canada) (United States) 2026 FIFA World Cup	International	Spain
12–14	Motorcycle racing	2026 ARRC Japan round	International	R1: (Malaysia) Hafizh Syahrin ( (Malaysia) JDT Racing Team); R2: (Malaysia) Hafizh Syahrin ( (Malaysia) JDT Racing Team)
12–5 July	T20 Cricket	(England) (Wales) 2026 ICC Women's T20 Cricket World Cup	International	Australia
13	Boxing	(United States) Jesse 'Bam' Rodriguez vs. Antonio Vargas (men's title WBA #10)	International	(United States) Jesse Rodriguez (WBA bantamweight world title)
13	Boxing	(United States) Oshae Jones vs. Elia Carranza (women's title IBF #11)	International	(United States) Oshae Jones IBF light-middleweight world title)
13	Boxing	(United States) Estefany Alegria Osorio vs. Evelin Nazarena Bermudez (women's title WBO/IBF #12/12)	International	(Mexico) Estefany Alegria (WBO & IBF light-flyweight world titles)
13	Boxing	(United States) Tiara Brown vs. Hannah Noelle (women's title WBC #10)	International	(United States) Tiara Brown (WBC featherweight world title)
13	Boxing	(United States) Nataly Delgado vs. Jasmine Artiga (women's title WBA #10)	International	(Panama) Nataly Delgado (WBA super-flyweight world title)
13	Wrestling	(United States) RAF 10: Chimaev vs. Danis	International	(United Arab Emirates) Khamzat Chimaev
13–14	Motorcycle racing	2026 WSBK Emilia-Romagna round	International	R1: (Italy) Nicolò Bulega ( (Italy) Aruba.it Racing – Ducati); SR: (Italy) Nicolò Bulega ( (Italy) Aruba.it Racing – Ducati); R2: (Italy) Nicolò Bulega ( (Italy) Aruba.it Racing – Ducati)
13–14	Handball	(Germany) 2025–26 EHF Champions League Final Four	Continental	(Spain) Barça
13–14	Endurance racing	(France) 2026 24 Hours of Le Mans (WEC #4)	International	Hypercar: (United Kingdom) Mike Conway & (Japan) Kamui Kobayashi & (Netherlands) Nyck de Vries ( (Japan) Toyota Racing); LMGT3: (Netherlands) Nicky Catsburg & (United Kingdom) Jonny Edgar & (United States) Ben Keating ( (United Kingdom) TF Sport)
13	Road Cycling	(Denmark) 2026 Copenhagen Sprint (WWT #20)	International	(Netherlands) Lorena Wiebes(Team SD Worx–Protime)
14	Formula racing	(Spain) 2026 Barcelona-Catalunya Grand Prix (F1) #9	International	(United Kingdom) Lewis Hamilton ( (Italy) Scuderia Ferrari)
14	Mixed martial arts	(United States) UFC Freedom 250	International	(United States) Justin Gaethje
14	Road Cycling	(Denmark) 2026 Copenhagen Sprint (UWT #24)	International	(Belgium) Jasper Philipsen(Alpecin–Premier Tech)
15–20	Fencing	(Peru) 2026 Pan American Fencing Championships	Continental	United States
15–26	Sport shooting	(Germany) 2026 ISSF Junior World Championship	International	India
16–21	Fencing	(France) 2026 European Fencing Championships	Continental	Italy
16–22	Chess	(Hong Kong) World Rapid and Blitz Team Chess Championships 2026	International	Rapid: (China) Dragon Chilling; Blitz: (China) Dragon Chilling
17–20	Squash	(France) 2025–26 PSA Squash Tour Finals	International	Men: (Peru) Diego Elías; Women: (Egypt) Hania El Hammamy
17–21	Climbing	(Austria) 2026 World Climbing Series (WCS#6)	International	Men's Bouldering: (Japan) Sorato Anraku; Women's Bouldering: (United States) Annie Sanders; Men's Lead: (Japan) Neo Suzuki; Women's Lead: (Slovenia) Janja Garnbret
17–21	Gymnastics	(Brazil) 2026 Pan American Artistic Gymnastics Championships	Continental	United States
17–21	Road Cycling	(Switzerland) 2026 Tour de Suisse (UWT #25)	International	General Classification: (Slovenia) Tadej Pogačar(UAE Team Emirates XRG); Points Classification: (Slovenia) Tadej Pogačar(UAE Team Emirates XRG); Mountain Classification: (Belgium) Louis Vervaeke(Soudal–Quick-Step); Young Rider Classification: (Czech Republic) Mathias Vacek(Lidl–Trek); Team Classification: UAE Team Emirates XRG
17–21	Road Cycling	(Switzerland) 2026 Tour de Suisse Women (WWT #21)	International	General Classification: (Switzerland) Marlen Reusser(Movistar Team); Points Classification: (Switzerland) Marlen Reusser(Movistar Team); Mountain Classification: (Netherlands) Femke de Vries(Visma–Lease a Bike); Young Rider Classification: (France) Cédrine Kerbaol(EF Education–Oatly); Team Classification: AG Insurance–Soudal
18–18 July	Cricket	(United States) 2026 Major League Cricket Season	Domestic	(United States) Los Angeles Knight Riders
18–21	Golf	(United States) 2026 U.S. Open	International	(United States) Wyndham Clark
18–21	Gymnastics	(China) 2026 Asian Men's Artistic Gymnastics Championships	Continental	China
18–21	Karate	(Indonesia) 2026 Asian Karate Championships	Continental	Japan
18–24	Fencing	(India) 2026 Asian Fencing Championships	Continental	Japan
19–21	Judo	(Mongolia) 2026 Judo Grand Slam Ulaanbaatar (GS #6)	International	Japan
19–27	Surfing	(Brazil) VIVO Rio Pro (WSL #6)	International	Men: (Brazil) Yago Dora; Women: (United States) Sawyer Lindblad
20	Formula Racing	(China) 2026 Sanya ePrix (FE #11)	International	(United Kingdom) Jake Dennis ( (United States) Andretti Formula E)
20	Rugby union	2026 United Rugby Championship finals	International	(Ireland) Leinster
20–28	Volleyball	(India) 2026 AVC Men's Volleyball Cup	Continental	Indonesia
21	Motorcycle racing	2026 Czech Republic motorcycle Grand Prix (MotoGP #9)	International	MotoGP: (Spain) Marc Márquez ( (Italy) Ducati Lenovo Team); Moto2: (Spain) Iván Ortolá ( (Spain) QJMotor – Exocom – MSi); Moto3: (Malaysia) Hakim Danish ( (Spain) Aeon Credit – MT Helmets – MSi)
21–22	Sailing	2026 Canada Sail Grand Prix (SailGP #7)	International	(Spain) Los Gallos
23–28	Beach handball	(Croatia) 2026 Men's Beach Handball World Championships (Croatia) 2026 Women's Beach Handball World Championships	International	Men: Germany; Women: Argentina
23–24	Basketball	(United States) 2026 NBA draft	Domestic	(United States) AJ Dybantsa ( (Utah) BYU)
24	Boxing	(Australia) Liam Paro vs. Lewis Crocker (men's title IBF #9)	International	(Australia) Liam Paro (IBF Welterweight world title)
24–27	Softball	(Belgium) 2026 Men's Slowpitch European Championship	Continental	Netherlands
24–28	BMX	(France) 2026 European BMX Championships	Continental	Men: (France) Mathis Ragot Richard; Women: (Netherlands) Laura Smulders
24–28	Finswimming	(South Korea) 2026 Finswimming World Championships	International	CMAS
24–5 July	Handball	(China) 2026 IHF Women's U20 Handball World Championship	International	Germany
25–28	Golf	(United States) 2026 Women's PGA Championship	International	(South Korea) Ryu Hae-ran
25–28	Gymnastics	(China) 2026 Asian Women's Artistic Gymnastics Championships	Continental	China
25–28	Rallying	(Greece) 2026 Acropolis Rally (WRC #8)	International	WRC: (France) Sébastien Ogier & Vincent Landais ( (Japan) Toyota Gazoo Racing WRT); WRC–2: (Estonia) Robert Virves & Jakko Viilo; WRC–3: (Italy) Matteo Fontana & Alessandro Arnaboldi
25–4 July	Box lacrosse	(Czech Republic) 2026 European Box Lacrosse Championships	Continental	Men: Ireland; Women: Israel
26–27	Ice Hockey	(United States) 2026 NHL entry draft	Domestic	(Canada) Gavin McKenna
26–28	Athletics	(Colombia) 2026 Pan American Championships in Athletics	Continental	Dominican Republic
26–28	Judo	(China) 2026 Judo Grand Prix Qingdao (GP #2)	International	Japan
26–28	Modern pentathlon	(Hungary) 2026 Modern Pentathlon World Cup Final	International	Men: (Germany) Marvin Dogue; Women: (Switzerland) Anna Jurt
26–5 July	Table Tennis	United States Smash 2026 (Grand Smash #2)	International	Men: (Japan) Sora Matsushima; Women: (China) Sun Yingsha
27–5 July	Basketball	(Turkey) 2026 FIBA Under-17 Basketball World Cup	International	United States
27–7 July	Bowling	(Malaysia) 2026 IBF World Youth Championships	International	United States
27–10 July	Association football	(Bosnia and Herzegovina) 2026 UEFA Women's Under-19 Championship	Continental	Spain
27	Boxing	(United States) Jaron Ennis vs. Xander Zayas (men's title WBO/WBA #12/7)	International	(United States) Jaron Ennis (WBO & WBA light-middleweight world titles)
28	Formula racing	(Austria) 2026 Austrian Grand Prix (F1) #10	International	(United Kingdom) George Russell ( (Germany) Mercedes)
28	Motorcycle racing	(Netherlands) 2026 Dutch TT (MotoGP #10)	International	MotoGP: (Japan) Ai Ogura ( (United States) SuperFile Trackhouse MotoGP Team); Moto2: (Colombia) David Alonso ( (Spain) CFMoto Azul Marino Aspar Team); Moto3: (Spain) Máximo Quiles ( (Spain) CFMoto Gaviota Aspar Team)
28	Triathlon	(Germany) 2026 Ironman European Championships	International	Men: (Norway) Casper Stornes; Women: (Norway) Solveig Løvseth
28–11 July	Association football	(Wales) 2026 UEFA European Under-19 Championship	Continental	Spain
29–4 July	Volleyball	(Portugal) 2026 Men's U22 European Volleyball Championship	Continental	Czech Republic
29–12 July	Tennis	(United Kingdom) 2026 Wimbledon Championships (Grand Slam #3)	International	Men: (Italy) Jannik Sinner; Women: (Czech Republic) Linda Nosková
30–4 July	Artistic swimming	(Germany) 2026 European Junior Artistic Swimming Championships	Continental	(Individual Neutral Athletes) AIN(Russia)
30–4 July	Softball	(Czech Republic) 2026 U-16 Men's Softball European Championship (Czech Republic) 2026 U-18 Men's Softball European Championship	Continental	U-16: Czech Republic; U-18: Czech Republic

=== July ===
Date	Sport	Venue/Event	Status	Winner/s
1–5	Canoeing	(Canada) 2026 ICF Junior and U23 Canoe Sprint World Championships	International	Hungary
1–7	Volleyball	(Thailand) 2026 AVC Girls' U18 Volleyball Championship	Continental	China
1–12	Volleyball	(Lithuania) (Latvia) 2026 Women's U18 European Volleyball Championship	Continental	Italy
2–23 August	Esports	(France) 2026 Esports World Cup	International	(China) AG.AL
3–5	Climbing	(Poland) 2026 World Climbing Series (WCS#7)	International	Men's Speed: (United States) Samuel Watson; Women's Speed: (Indonesia) Desak Made Rita Kusuma Dewi; Men's Speed Relay: (China) Long Jianguo & (China) Chu Shouhong; Women's Speed Relay: (China) Zhou Yafei & (China) Deng Lijuan; Mixed Speed Relay: (United States) Samuel Watson & (United States) Emma Hunt
4	Boxing	(United States) Abdullah Mason vs. Albert Bell (men's title WBO #13)	International	(United States) Abdullah Mason (WBO lightweight world title)
4	Boxing	(United States) Bruce Carrington vs Rene Palacios (men's title WBC #9)	International	(United States) Bruce Carrington (WBC featherweight world title)
4–5	Formula Racing	(China) 2026 Shanghai ePrix (FE #12/13)	International	R12: (Germany) Pascal Wehrlein ( (Germany) Porsche Formula E Team); R13: (Brazil) Lucas di Grassi ( (United Kingdom) Lola Yamaha ABT Formula E Team)
4–12	Basketball	(Lithuania) 2026 FIBA U20 Women's EuroBasket	Continental	France
4–18	Volleyball	(Italy) 2026 Men's U18 European Volleyball Championship	Continental	Poland
4-26	Road Cycling	2026 Tour de France (UWT #26)	International	General Classification: (Slovenia) Tadej Pogačar(UAE Team Emirates XRG); Points Classification: (Denmark) Mads Pedersen(Lidl–Trek); Mountain Classification: (Ecuador) Richard Carapaz(EF Education–EasyPost); Young Rider Classification: (Mexico) Isaac del Toro(UAE Team Emirates XRG); Team Classification: Lidl–Trek
5	Formula racing	(United Kingdom) 2026 British Grand Prix (F1) #11	International	(Monaco) Charles Leclerc ( (Italy) Scuderia Ferrari)
5–11	Weightlifting	(Colombia) 2026 World Youth Weightlifting Championships	International	Georgia
6–12	Volleyball	(Netherlands) 2026 Women's U22 European Volleyball Championship	Continental	Italy
6–12	Wrestling	(North Macedonia) 2026 U20 European Wrestling Championship	Continental	Men's freestyle:Russia; Men's Greco-Roman:Russia; Women's freestyle:Russia
7–11	Baseball	(France) 2026 U-12 Baseball European Championship	Continental	Germany
7–11	Orienteering	(Italy) 2026 World Orienteering Championships	International	Switzerland
7–12	Swimming	(Germany) 2026 European Junior Swimming Championships	Continental	(Individual Neutral Athletes) AIN(Russia)
7–12	Track cycling	(Germany) 2026 UEC European Track Championships (under-23 & junior)	Continental	Italy
8–19	Handball	(Romania) 2026 European Men's U-20 Handball Championship	Continental	Hungary
9–12	Athletics	(China) 2026 Asian U23 Athletics Championships	Continental	China
9–12	Golf	(France) 2026 Evian Championship	International	(South Korea) Ryu Hae-ran
10–12	Climbing	(France) 2026 World Climbing Series (WCS#8)	International	Men's Speed: (Indonesia) Veddriq Leonardo; Women's Speed: (Indonesia) Desak Made Rita Kusuma Dewi; Men's Lead: (Spain) Alberto Ginés López; Women's Lead: (United States) Annie Sanders
11	Boxing	(Russia) Murat Gassiev vs. Peter Kadiru (men's title WBA #8)	International	(Russia) Murat Gassiev (WBA heavyweight world title)
11	Mixed martial arts	(United States) UFC 329: McGregor vs. Holloway 2	International	(United States) Max Holloway
11	Wrestling	(Georgia (country)) RAF Georgia: Dvalishvili vs. Cejudo	International	(Georgia (country)) Merab Dvalishvili
11–12	Endurance racing	(Japan) 2026 GT World Challenge Asia (Fuji Speedway round #4)	International	R1: (China) Chen Weian & (Hong Kong) Liu Kaishun ( (Hong Kong) Harmony Racing); R2: (Germany) Laurin Heinrich & (China) Lu Wei ( (China) Origine Motorsport)
11–12	Mountain Biking	(Spain) 2026 UEC Mountain Biking Marathon European Championships	Continental	Men: (Spain) David Valero Serrano; Women: (Switzerland) Anna Weinbeer
11–12	Motorcycle racing	(United Kingdom) 2026 WSBK Donington Park round	International	R1: (Spain) Iker Lecuona ( (Italy) Aruba.it Racing – Ducati); SR: (Italy) Nicolò Bulega ( (Italy) Aruba.it Racing – Ducati); R2: (Italy) Nicolò Bulega ( (Italy) Aruba.it Racing – Ducati)
11–19	Basketball	(Czech Republic) 2026 FIBA Under-17 Women's Basketball World Cup	International	United States
11–19	Basketball	(Slovenia) 2026 FIBA U20 EuroBasket	Continental	Slovenia
12	Motorcycle racing	(Germany) 2026 German motorcycle Grand Prix (MotoGP #11)	International	MotoGP: (Spain) Marc Márquez ( (Italy) Ducati Lenovo Team); Moto2: (Spain) Iván Ortolá ( (Spain) QJMotor – MSi); Moto3: (Spain) Brian Uriarte ( (Finland) Red Bull KTM Ajo)
12	Endurance racing	(Brazil) 2026 6 Hours of São Paulo (WEC #5)	International	Hypercar: (Denmark) Kevin Magnussen, (Switzerland) Raffaele Marciello & (Belgium) Dries Vanthoor ( (Germany) BMW M Team WRT); LMGT3: (Republic of Ireland) Peter Dempsey, (Republic of Ireland) Charlie Eastwood & (Switzerland) Salih Yoluç ( (Switzerland) Racing Team Turkey)
12–18	Volleyball	(China) 2026 AVC Boys' U18 Volleyball Championship	Continental	Iran
13–19	Baseball	(Italy) 2026 U-18 Baseball European Championship	Continental	Italy
14	Baseball	(United States) 2026 Major League Baseball All-Star Game	Domestic	American League
14–16	Taekwondo	(South Korea) 2026 World Cup Taekwondo Team Championships	International	Men's Team:China; Women's Team:Morocco; Mixed Team:Iran
14–18	Softball	(United Kingdom) 2026 Coed Slowpitch European Championship	Continental	Great Britain
14–19	Badminton	2026 Japan Open (Super 750 #3)	International	Men: (France) Christo Popov; Women: (India) P.V.Sindhu
16–19	Golf	(United Kingdom) 2026 Open Championship	International	(New Zealand) Ryan Fox
16–19	Rallying	2026 Rally Estonia (WRC #9)	International	WRC: (Finland) Sami Pajari & Marko Salminen ( (Japan) Toyota Gazoo Racing WRT 2); WRC–2: (Estonia) Robert Virves & Jakko Viilo ( (Germany) Toksport WRT); WRC–3: (Poland) Tymoteusz Abramowski & Jakub Wróbel
17–25	BMX Racing	(Australia) 2026 UCI BMX World Championships	International	Australia; Great Britain
17–8 August	T20 Cricket	(Sri Lanka) 2026 Lanka Premier League season	Domestic	(Sri Lanka) Galle Gallants
18	Wrestling	(United States) RAF 11: Tsarukyan vs. Covington	International	(United States) Colby Covington
19	Formula racing	(Belgium) 2026 Belgian Grand Prix (F1) #12	International	(Italy) Kimi Antonelli ( (Germany) Mercedes)
19–26	Inline speed skating	(Italy) 2026 European Inline Speed Skating Championships	Continental	Italy
20	Boxing	(Japan) Shokichi Iwata vs. Erik Badillo (men's title WBO #14)	International	(Japan) Shokichi Iwata (WBO light-flyweight world title)
20	Boxing	(Japan) Kenshiro Teraji vs. Israel Gonzalez (men's title WBO #15)	International	(Japan) Kenshiro Teraji (WBO super-flyweight title)
20–25	Canoe slalom	(United States) 2026 ICF Canoe Slalom World Championships	International	Czech Republic
20–25	Softball	(Czech Republic) 2026 U-22 Women's Softball European Championship	Continental	Italy
20–26	Archery	(Italy) 2026 European Youth Archery Championships	Continental	Turkey
21–26	Badminton	2026 China Open (Super 1000 #4)	International	Men: (Chinese Taipei) Chou Tien-chen; Women: (Japan) Akane Yamaguchi
21–16 August	Cricket	(United Kingdom) 2026 The Hundred season	Domestic	Men: (United Kingdom) Manchester Super Giants; Women: (United Kingdom) Trent Rockets
22–26	Rowing	(Germany) 2026 World Rowing U23 Championships	International	Greece
22–30	Fencing	(Hong Kong) 2026 World Fencing Championships	International	Italy
23–29	Modern pentathlon	(Lithuania) 2026 World Junior Modern Pentathlon Championships	International	Egypt
23–2 August	Multi-sport	(Scotland) 2026 Commonwealth Games	International	Australia
24–2 August	Lacrosse	(Japan) 2026 World Lacrosse Women's Championship	International	United States
25–26	Formula Racing	(Japan) 2026 Tokyo ePrix (FE #14/15)	International	R14: (United Kingdom) Dan Ticktum ( (United States) Cupra Kiro); R15: (Netherlands) Nyck de Vries ( (India) Mahindra Racing
25	Boxing	(Saudi Arabia) Josh Kelly vs. Caoimhin Agyarko (men's title IBF #10)	International	(United Kingdom) Josh Kelly (IBF light-middleweight world title)
25	Boxing	(Saudi Arabia) Hamzah Sheeraz vs. Simon Zachenhuber (men's title WBO #16)	International	(United Kingdom) Hamzah Sheeraz (WBO super-middleweight world title)
26	Formula racing	(Hungary) 2026 Hungarian Grand Prix (F1) #13	International	(United Kingdom) Lando Norris ( (United Kingdom) McLaren)
26–27	Sailing	(United Kingdom) 2026 Emirates Great Britain Sail Grand Prix (SailGP #8)	International	(Spain) Los Gallos
26–16 August	Association football	(Morocco) 2026 Women's Africa Cup of Nations	Continental	Cameroon
26–13 December	Association football	(Argentina) 2026 AFA Liga Profesional de Fútbol Tornea Clausura season	Domestic	
27–1 August	Softball	(Netherlands) 2026 U-15 Women's Softball European Championship	Continental	Italy
27–2 August	Wrestling	(Azerbaijan) 2026 U17 World Wrestling Championships	International	Men's Freestyle:Russia; Men's Greco-Roman:Russia; Women's Freestyle:United States
29–9 August	Handball	(Romania) 2026 IHF Women's U18 Handball World Championship	International	Spain
30–2 August	Mountain biking	(Switzerland) 2026 UEC Mountain Bike European Cross Country Championships	Continental	Switzerland
30–2 August	Rowing	(Italy) 2026 European Rowing Championships	Continental	Romania
30–2 August	Golf	(England) 2026 Women's British Open	International	(Japan) Shiho Kuwaki
30–2 August	Rallying	2026 Rally Finland (WRC #10)	International	WRC: (Finland) Sami Pajari & Marko Salminen ( (Japan) Toyota Gazoo Racing WRT 2); WRC–2: (Estonia) Robert Virves & Jakko Viilo ( (Germany) Toksport WRT); WRC–3: (Spain) Gil Membrado & Adrián Pérez
31–16 August	Aquatics	(France) 2026 European Aquatics Championships	Continental	Great Britain

=== August ===
Date	Sport	Venue/Event	Status	Winner/s
1–9	Road Cycling	2026 Tour de France Femmes (WWT #22)	International	General Classification: (Netherlands) Demi Vollering(FDJ United–Suez); Points Classification: (Netherlands) Lorena Wiebes(Team SD Worx–Protime); Mountain Classification: (Netherlands) Puck Pieterse(Fenix–Premier Tech); Young Rider Classification: (Germany) Antonia Niedermaier(Canyon//SRAM); Team Classification: UAE Team L'Imad
1	Road Cycling	(Spain) 2026 Clásica de San Sebastián (UWT #27)	International	(Belgium) Remco Evenepoel(Red Bull–Bora–Hansgrohe)
2–13	Tennis	(Canada) 2026 Canadian Open (ATP 1000 #5/ WTA 1000 #7)	International	Men: (United States) Ben Shelton; Women: (Poland) Iga Świątek
3–9	Modern pentathlon	(Turkey) 2026 European Modern Pentathlon Championships	Continental	Hungary
3–9	Road Cycling	(Poland) 2026 Tour de Pologne (UWT #28)	International	General Classification: (Germany) Marco Brenner(Tudor Pro Cycling Team); Points Classification: (Germany) Marco Brenner(Tudor Pro Cycling Team); Mountain Classification: (Italy) Walter Calzoni(Pinarello–Q36.5 Pro Cycling Team); Team Classification: Visma–Lease a Bike
4–9	Table Tennis	(Japan) WTT Champions Yokohama 2026 (WTT Champions #3)	International	Men: (Japan) Tomokazu Harimoto; Women: (Japan) Miwa Harimoto
5–9	Athletics	(United States) 2026 World Athletics U20 Championships	International	United States
5–9	Rowing	(Bulgaria) 2026 World Rowing Junior Championships	International	Romania; Germany
6–16	Volleyball	(Chile) 2026 FIVB Volleyball Girls' U17 World Championship	International	United States
7–23 May 2027	Association football	(Netherlands) 2026–27 Eredivisie season	Domestic	
8–16	Table Tennis	Europe Smash – Sweden 2026 (Grand Smash #3)	International	Men: (France) Félix Lebrun; Women: (China) Wang Manyu
8–18	Surfing	(French Polynesia) Outerknown Tahiti Pro (WSL #7)	International	Men: (Hawaii) Seth Moniz; Women: (Canada) Erin Brooks
8–21	Chess	(United States) 2026 Cairns Cup	International	(China) Tan Zhongyi
9	Motorcycle racing	(United Kingdom) 2026 British motorcycle Grand Prix (MotoGP #12)	International	MotoGP: (Spain) Raúl Fernández ( (United States) SuperFile Trackhouse MotoGP Team); Moto2: (Czech Republic) Filip Salač ( (United States) OnlyFans American Racing Team); Moto3: (Spain) David Almansa ( (Germany) Liqui Moly Dynavolt Intact GP)
9 – 28/29 November	Australian rules football	(Australia) 2026 AFL Women's season	Domestic	
10–15	Baseball	(China) 2026 U-12 Asian Baseball Championship	Continental	Japan
10–16	Athletics	(United Kingdom) 2026 European Athletics Championships	Continental	Italy
10–20	Chess	(United States) 2026 Sinquefield Cup	International	(United States) Wesley So
11–22	Boxing	(Serbia) 2026 U19 European Boxing Championships	Continental	Russia
11–23	Equestrian	(Germany) 2026 FEI World Championships	International	Germany
12–15	Swimming	(United States) 2026 Pan Pacific Swimming Championships	Multi-continental	United States
12–16 August	Swimming	(Hungary) 2026 World Aquatics Artistic Swimming Junior Championships	International	Russia
12–16	Rhythmic gymnastics	(Germany) 2026 Rhythmic Gymnastics World Championships	International	Germany
13–16	Artistic gymnastics	(Croatia) 2026 European Women's Artistic Gymnastics Championships	Continental	AIN (WG2/Russia)
13–23	Tennis	(United States) 2026 Cincinnati Open (ATP 1000 #6/ WTA 1000 #8)	International	Men: (France) Arthur Fils; Women: (United States) Coco Gauff
13–30	Golf	(United States) 2026 FedEx Cup Playoffs	International	(United States) Scottie Scheffler
13–16	Flag football	(Germany) 2026 IFAF Men's Flag Football World Championship (Germany) 2026 IFAF Women's Flag Football World Championship	International	Men: United States; Women: Canada
14–16	Judo	(Peru) 2026 Judo Grand Prix Lima (GP #3)	International	Brazil
15	Mixed martial arts	(United States) UFC 330:Makhachev vs Machado Garry	International	(Russia) Islam Makhachev
15–16	Formula Racing	(United Kingdom) London ePrix (FE #16/17)	International	R16: (Germany) Pascal Wehrlein( (Germany) Porsche Formula E Team); R17: (United Kingdom) Taylor Barnard ( (United States) DS Penske)
15–30	Field hockey	(Belgium) (Netherlands) 2026 Men's FIH Hockey World Cup (Belgium) (Netherlands) 2026 Women's FIH Hockey World Cup	International	Men:Germany; Women:Argentina
15–17 May 2027	Association football	(Germany) 2026/27 DFB-Pokal Frauen season	Domestic	
16	Association football	(England) 2026 FA Community Shield	Domestic	(England) Arsenal
16–23	Wrestling	(Slovakia) 2026 U20 World Wrestling Championships	International	Men's freestyle:United States; Men's Greco-Roman:Russia; Women's freestyle:Japan
16–15 May 2027	Association football	2026/27 Coupe de France season	Domestic	
16	Road Cycling	(Germany) 2026 Hamburg Cyclassics (UWT #29)	International	(France) Paul Magnier(Soudal–Quick-Step)
17–23	Badminton	(India) 2026 BWF World Championships	International	Men: (France) Alex Lanier; Women: (South Korea) An Se-young
19–23	Artistic gymnastics	(Croatia) 2026 European Men's Artistic Gymnastics Championships	Continental	Great Britain
19–23	Track cycling	(Belgium) 2026 UCI Junior Track Cycling World Championships	International	Italy
19–29	Volleyball	(Qatar) 2026 FIVB Volleyball Boys' U17 World Championship	International	Iran
19–23	Road Cycling	(Belgium) / (Netherlands) 2026 Renewi Tour (UWT #30)	International	General Classification: (Belgium) Jasper Philipsen(Alpecin–Premier Tech); Points Classification: (Belgium) Jasper Philipsen(Alpecin–Premier Tech); Young Rider Classification: (Italy) Pietro Mattio(Visma–Lease a Bike); Team Classification: XDS Astana Team
19–23	Road Cycling	(United Kingdom) 2026 Tour of Britain Women (WWT #23)	International	General Classification: (Mauritius) Kim Le Court-Pienaar(AG Insurance–Soudal); Points Classification: (Netherlands) Lorena Wiebes(Team SD Worx–Protime); Mountain Classification: (United Kingdom) Lauren Dickson(FDJ United–Suez); Young Rider Classification: (Belgium) Fleur Moors(Lidl–Trek); Team Classification: Lidl–Trek
20–23	Judo	(Ecuador) 2026 World Judo Cadets Championships	International	Kazakhstan
20–30	Baseball	(United States) 2026 Little League World Series	International	(Curaçao) Pariba Little League
21–30	Volleyball	(Dominican Republic) 2026 Women's NORCECA Volleyball Championship	Continental	Canada
21–30	Volleyball	(China) 2026 AVC Women's Volleyball Continental Championship	Continental	Thailand
21–3 September	Multi-sport	(Italy) 2026 Mediterranean Games	International	Italy
21–6 September	Volleyball	(Azerbaijan) / (Czech Republic) / (Sweden) / (Turkey) 2026 Women's European Volleyball Championship	Continental	Turkey
21–23 May 2027	Association football	(Germany) 2026/27 Frauen-Bundesliga season	Domestic	
21–29 May 2027	Association football	(Germany) 2026/27 DFB-Pokal season	Domestic	
21–28 August 2026	Diving	(Croatia) 2026 World Aquatics Junior Diving Championships	International	Russia
22	Association football	(Germany) 2026 Franz Beckenbauer Supercup	Domestic	(Germany) Bayern Munich
22	Wrestling	(United States) RAF 12	International	(United States) Henry Cejudo
22–13 September	Road Cycling	(Spain) 2026 Vuelta a España (UWT #31)	International	General Classification: (Spain) Enric Mas(Movistar Team); Points Classification: (Belgium) Wout van Aert(Visma–Lease a Bike); Mountain Classification: (Colombia) Santiago Buitrago(Team Bahrain Victorious); Young Rider Classification: (United Kingdom) Oscar Onley(Netcompany INEOS); Team Classification: Decathlon CMA CGM
22–27	Chess	(United States) 2026 Grand Chess Tour Finals	International	(India) R Praggnanandhaa
22–29 May 2027	Association football	(France) 2026/27 Ligue 1 season	Domestic	
22–30 May 2027	Association football	(England) 2026/27 Premier League season	Domestic	
23–30 May 2027	Association football	(Italy) 2026/27 Serie A season	Domestic	
23	Formula Racing	(Netherlands) 2026 Dutch Grand Prix (F1) #14	International	(United Kingdom) Lando Norris ( (United Kingdom) McLaren)
23–24	Sailing	2026 Germany Sail Grand Prix SailGP #9)	International	(Australia) Bonds Flying Roos
23–30	Rowing	(Netherlands) 2026 World Rowing Championships	International	Netherlands
24–30	Modern pentathlon	(China) 2026 World Modern Pentathlon Championships	International	Belarus
25–4 September	Volleyball	(Kenya) 2026 Women's African Nations Volleyball Championship	Continental	Egypt
25–4 September	Surfing	Fiji Pro (WSL #8)	International	Men: (United States) Cole Houshmand; Women: (Canada) Erin Brooks
26–30	Mountain biking	(Italy) 2026 UCI Mountain Bike World Championships	International	Switzerland
26–30	Canoeing	(Poland) 2026 ICF Canoe Sprint World Championships	International	Germany
26–30	Disc golf	(United States) 2026 PDGA World Championships	International	
26–30	Table tennis	(Australia) 2026 Oceania Table Tennis Championships	Continental	Men: (Australia) Finn Luu; Women: (Australia) Yangzi Liu
27–30	Rallying	2026 Rally del Paraguay (WRC#11)	International	WRC: (Finland) Sami Pajari & Marko Salminen ( (Japan) Toyota Gazoo Racing WRT 2); WRC–2: (Paraguay) Diego Domínguez Jr. & (Spain) Rogelio Peñate ( (Germany) Toksport WRT 2); WRC–3: (Bolivia) Nataniel Bruun & (Argentina) Mario Javier del Riego
28–22 May 2027	Association football	(Germany) 2026/27 Bundesliga season	Domestic	
28–30	Grass skiing	(Italy) 2026 FIS Grass Skiing World Cup Final	International	Italy
28–30	Judo	(Switzerland) 2026 Judo Grand Slam Lausanne (GS #7)	International	Russia
29–30	Endurance racing	(Japan) 2026 GT World Challenge Asia (Okayama round #5)	International	R1: (China) Cheng Congfu & (China) Yu Kuai ( (Hong Kong) No. 16 FAW Audi Sport Asia Team Phantom); R2: (New Zealand) Jaxon Evans & (Indonesia) Andrés pato ( (Hong Kong) No. 15 Audi Sport Asia Team Phantom)
29–12 December	American football	(United States) 2026 NCAA Division I FBS football season	Domestic	
29	Boxing	(United Kingdom) Chantelle Cameron vs. Mikaela Mayer	International	(United Kingdom) Chantelle Cameron (WBC, WBO & WBA light-middleweight world titles)
29	Boxing	(United Kingdom) Caroline Dubois vs. Amelia Moore	International	(United Kingdom) Caroline Dubois (WBC & WBO lightweight world titles)
29	Road Cycling	(France) 2026 Classic Lorient Agglomération (WWT #24)	International	(Italy) Elisa Balsamo(Lidl–Trek)
30	Marathon	(Australia) 2026 Sydney Marathon (WMM #4)	International	Men: (Ethiopia) Addisu Gobena; Women: (Kenya) Peres Jepchirchir
30	Gravel biking	(Belgium) 2026 European Gravel Championships	International	Men: (Denmark) Mads Würtz Schmidt; Women: (Netherlands) Femke Markus
30	Motorcycle racing	2026 Aragon motorcycle Grand Prix (MotoGP #13)	International	MotoGP: (Spain) Marc Márquez( (Italy) Ducati Lenovo Team); Moto2: (Spain) Alonso López( (Italy) Italjet Gresini Moto2); Moto3: (Spain) Máximo Quiles ( (Spain) CFMoto Aspar Team)
30–13 September	Tennis	(United States) 2026 US Open (Grand Slam #4)	International	Men: (Germany) Alexander Zverev; Women: (Kazakhstan) Elena Rybakina
30	Road Cycling	(France) 2026 Bretagne Classic (UWT #32)	International	(Spain) Alex Aranburu(Cofidis)
31–6 September	Water polo	(Croatia) 2026 World Aquatics 4x4 Water Polo Championships	International	Men:Spain; Women:United States
31–6 September	Multi-sport	(Kyrgyzstan) 2026 World Nomad Games	International	Kazakhstan
31–13 September	Artistic roller skating	(Italy) 2026 European Artistic Roller Skating Championships	Continental	Italy

=== September ===
Date	Sport	Venue/Event	Status	Winner/s
1–6	Squash	2026 London squash classic (Gold #1)	International	Men: (New Zealand) Paul Coll; Women: (Egypt) Amina Orfi
1–6	Badminton	2026 China Masters (Super 750 #4)	International	Men: (Hong Kong) Jason Gunawan; Women: (South Korea) An Se-young
3–6	Open Water Swimming	(Argentina) 2026 World Aquatics Junior Open Water Swimming Championships	International	Russia
4–5	Climbing	(Slovenia) 2026 World Climbing Series (WCS#9)	International	Men's Lead: (Japan) Neo Suzuki; Women's Lead: (Slovenia) Janja Garnbret
4–6	Road Cycling	(United States) 2026 UCI Para-cycling Road World Championships	International	France
4–6	Road Cycling	(Switzerland) 2026 Tour de Romandie Féminin (WWT #25)	International	Race cancelled
4–13	Basketball	(Germany) 2026 FIBA Women's Basketball World Cup	International	United States
4–13	Volleyball	(Japan) 2026 AVC Men's Volleyball Continental Championship	Continental	Japan
5	Wrestling	(Russia) RAF Moscow:Chimaev vs Woodley	International	(United Arab Emirates) Khamzat Chimaev
5–6	Rowing	(Poland) 2026 European Rowing Under 23 Championships	Continental	Romania
5–6	Motorcycle racing	(France) 2026 WSBK French round	International	R1: (Italy) Nicolò Bulega ( (Italy) Aruba.it Racing – Ducati); SR: (Italy) Nicolò Bulega ( (Italy) Aruba.it Racing – Ducati); R2: (Italy) Nicolò Bulega ( (Italy) Aruba.it Racing – Ducati)
5–6	Sailing	2026 Spain Sail Grand Prix (SailGP #10)	International	United States SailGP Team
5–7	Taekwondo	(South Korea) Muju 2026 World Taekwondo Grand Prix (GP #2)	International	Men:South Korea; Women:China; Overall:South Korea
5–13	Chess	(India) 2026 Tech Mahindra Global Chess League	International	Champion:Ganges Grandmasters; Season MVP: (Greece) Stavroula Tsolakidou; Final MVP: (FIDE) Ian Nepomniachtchi
5–27	Association football	(Poland) 2026 FIFA U-20 Women's World Cup	International	Spain
6	Formula racing	(Italy) 2026 Italian Grand Prix (F1) #15	International	(Italy) Kimi Antonelli ( (Germany) Mercedes)
6	Endurance racing	(United States) 2026 Lone Star Le Mans (WEC #6)	International	Hypercar: (Italy) Antonio Fuoco, (Spain) Miguel Molina & (Denmark) Nicklas Nielsen ( (Italy) Ferrari AF Corse); LMGT3: (Italy) Mattia Drudi, (United States) Ian James & (Canada) Zacharie Robichon ( (United States) The Heart of Racing)
7–12	Swimming	(Turkey) 2026 World Para Swimming European Championships	Continental	Russia
7–12	Sailing	(Republic of Ireland) 2026 Women's ILCA 6 World Championships	International	(United States) Charlotte Rose
7–13	Baseball	(Taiwan) 2026 U-18 Asian Baseball Championship	Continental	South Korea
8–13	Volleyball	(Brazil) 2026 Women's South American Volleyball Championship	Continental	Brazil
8–5 June 2027	Association football	2026–27 UEFA Champions League season	Continental	
8–13	Table Tennis	(Macau) WTT Champions Macao 2026 (WTT Champions #4)	International	Men: (Sweden) Truls Möregårdh; Women: (Japan) Miwa Harimoto
9–12	Disc golf	(Lithuania) 2026 World Team Disc Golf Championships	International	Norway
9–19	Wheelchair Basketball	(Canada) 2026 Wheelchair Basketball World Championships	International	Men:Australia; Women:United States
9–26	Volleyball	(Bulgaria) / (Finland) / (Italy) / (Romania) 2026 Men's European Volleyball Championship	Continental	Poland
9–10 January	American football	(United States) 2026 NFL season	Domestic	
10–13	Rallying	2026 Rally Chile (WRC #12)	International	WRC: (Sweden) Oliver Solberg & (United Kingdom) Elliott Edmondson ( (Japan) Toyota Gazoo Racing WRT); WRC-2: (France) Yohan Rossel & (France) Arnaud Dunand ( (Italy) Lancia Corse HF); WRC-3: (Turkey) Ali Türkkan & (Turkey) Bilge Ayan ( (Turkey) Castrol Ford Team Türkiye)
11–13	Climbing	(China) 2026 World Climbing Series (WCS#10)	International	Men's Speed: (Indonesia) Antasyafi Robby Al Hilmi; Women's Speed: (China) Deng Lijuan; Men's Speed Relay: (China) Ling Yongzhi & (China) Zhao Yicheng; Women's Speed Relay: (China) Fan Jingyue & (China) Zhang Shaoqin; Mixed Speed Relay: (Indonesia) Raharjati Nursamsa & (Indonesia) Rajiah Sallsabillah
11–13	Gymnastics	(Spain) 2026 Aerobic Gymnastics World Championships	International	Russia
11–13	Basketball	(Belgium) 2026 FIBA 3x3 Europe Cup	Continental	Men:Latvia; Women:Netherlands
11–13	Judo	(Hungary) 2026 Judo Grand Slam Budapest (GS #8)	International	Japan
11–13	Motorcycle racing	(Malaysia) 2026 ARRC Sepang round	International	R1: (Malaysia) Hafizh Syahrin ( (Malaysia) JDT Racing Team); R2: (Japan) Kaito Toba ( (Malaysia) Forty Forged Asia Racing Team)
11–13	Athletics	(Hungary) 2026 World Athletics Ultimate Championship	International	United States
11–16	Volleyball	(Canada) 2026 Men's NORCECA Volleyball Championship	Continental	United States
11–20	Surfing	(United States) Lexus Trestlers Pro (WSL #9)	International	Men: (Brazil) Miguel Pupo; Women: (Canada) Erin Brooks
11	Road Cycling	(Canada) 2026 Grand Prix Cycliste de Québec (UWT #33)	International	(Belgium) Remco Evenepoel(Red Bull–Bora–Hansgrohe)
12	Boxing	(United States) Ryan Garcia vs. Conor Benn	International	(United States) Ryan Garcia (WBC Welterweight world title)
12	Mountain Bike Cycling	(Italy) 2026 UCI Mountain Bike Marathon World Championships	International	Men: (Germany) Andreas Seewald; Women: (Switzerland) Anna Weinbeer
12–13	Archery	(Mexico) 2026 Archery World Cup Final	International	China
12–18	Squash	2026 QTerminals Qatar Classic (Platinum #1)	International	Men: (Egypt) Mostafa Asal; Women: (Egypt) Amina Orfi
12–19	Rugby Union	(Japan) 2026 World Rugby Pacific Nations Cup	Multi-continental	Japan
12–26	Multi-sport	(Argentina) 2026 South American Games	Continental	Brazil
12–31 October	Rugby Union	2026 WXV Global Series	International	
13	Motorcycle racing	2026 San Marino and Rimini Riviera motorcycle Grand Prix (MotoGP #14)	International	MotoGP: (Spain) Marc Márquez ( (Italy) Ducati Lenovo Team); Moto2: (Spain) Manuel González ( (Germany) Liqui Moly Dynavolt Intact GP); Moto3: (Spain) Máximo Quiles ( (Spain) CFMoto Aspar Team)
13	Formula racing	(Spain) 2026 Spanish Grand Prix (F1) #16	International	(Italy) Kimi Antonelli ( (Germany) Mercedes)
13	Road Cycling	(Canada) 2026 Grand Prix Cycliste de Montréal (UWT #34)	International	(Mexico) Isaac del Toro(UAE Team Emirates XRG)
14–1 May 2027	Association football	2026–27 AFC Champions League Elite season	Continental	
15–15 May 2027	Association football	2026–27 AFC Champions League Two season	Continental	
15–25	Volleyball	(Tunisia) 2026 Men's African Nations Volleyball Championship	Continental	Tunisia
15–19	Basketball	(China) 2026 FIBA 3x3 U23 World Cup	International	Men:Lithuania; Women:United States
15–20	Volleyball	(Brazil) 2026 Men's South American Volleyball Championship	Continental	Brazil
16–27	Chess	(Uzbekistan) 2026 FIDE Chess Olympiad	International	Men:Uzbekistan; Women:China
16–20	Taekwondo	(South Korea) 2026 World Poomsae Championships	International	South Korea
16–26 May 2027	Association football	2026–27 UEFA Europa League season	Continental	
17–20	Beach Volleyball	(Turkey) 2026 European U18 Beach Volleyball Championships	Continental	Men: (Austria) Hohenauer/Poinstingl; Women: (Netherlands) Both / de Groot
17–25	Amateur boxing	(Bulgaria) 2026 European Boxing Championships	Continental	Men:Russia; Women:Turkey; Overall:Russia
18	Wrestling	(United States) RAF 13:Covington vs Muhammad	International	(United States) Colby Covington
18–19	Basketball	(United Arab Emirates) 2026 EuroLeague SuperCup	International	(Spain) Real Madrid
18–20	Climbing	(China) 2026 World Climbing Series (WCS#11)	International	Men's Speed: (Japan) Ryo Omasa; Women's Speed: (United States) Emma Hunt; Men's Speed Relay: (Ukraine) Hryhorii Ilchyshyn & (Ukraine) Yaroslav Tkach; Women's Speed Relay: (China) Fan Jingyue & (China) Zhang Shaoqin; Mixed Speed Relay: (China) Mou yuju & (China) Ling Yongzhi
18	Wrestling	(United States) RAF 13:Covington vs Muhammad	International	(United States) Colby Covington
19–20	Running	(Denmark) 2026 World Athletics Road Running Championships	International	Kenya
19–20	Sailing	2026 Rolex Switzerland Grand Prix (SailGP #11)	International	(Spain) Los Gallos
19–26	Bowls	(Wales) 2026 European Bowls Championships	Continental	Ireland
19–4 October	Multi-sport	(Japan) 2026 Asian Games	International	China
19	Mixed martial arts	(United States) UFC 331:Van vs Pantoja 2	International	(United States) Joshua Van
20	Motorcycle racing	(Austria) 2026 Austrian motorcycle Grand Prix (MotoGP #15)	International	MotoGP: (Spain) Pedro Acosta ( (Austria) Red Bull KTM Factory Racing); Moto2: (Spain) Izan Guevara ( (Italy) Blu Cru Pramac Yamaha Moto2); Moto3: (Spain) Máximo Quiles ( (Spain) CFMoto Aspar Team)
20	Running	(Spain) 2026 IAU 100 km World Championship	International	Men: Charles R. Lawrence; Women: Courtney Marie Olsen
20	Cricket	(Barbados) 2026 Caribbean Premier League finals	Domestic	Antigua and Barbuda Falcons
20–27	Road bicycle racing	(Canada) 2026 UCI Road World Championships	International	Spain
22–27	Tennis	(China) 2026 Billie Jean King Cup finals	International	Czech Republic
22-27	Volleyball	(El Salvador) 2026 Men's U23 NORCECA Pan American Cup	International	United States
22–27	Basketball	(China) 2026 FIBA Intercontinental Cup	International	(United States) NBA G League United
22–27	Orienteering	(Lithuania) 2026 European Orienteering Championships	Continental	Sweden
24–26	Canoeing	(Italy) 2026 European Canoe Slalom Championships	Continental	France
24–27	Gymnastics	(Italy) 2026 Acrobatic Gymnastics World Championships	International	Israel
24–27	Golf	(United States) 2026 Presidents Cup	International	United States
24–3 October	Archery	(United States) 2026 World Archery 3D Championships	International	France
25–1 October	Handball	(Egypt) 2026 IHF Men's Club World Championship	International	(Hungary) Veszprém HC
25–27	Tennis	(United Kingdom) 2026 Laver Cup	International	(European Union) Team Europe
25–4 October	Baseball	(Mexico) 2026 U-15 Baseball World Cup	International	United States
25–19 June 2027	Rugby union	(England) 2026–27 Premiership Rugby season	Domestic	
26	Formula racing	2026 Azerbaijan Grand Prix (F1) #17	International	(United Kingdom) George Russell ( (Germany) Mercedes)
26	Speedway Racing	(Poland) 2026 Speedway Grand Prix Final	International	(United Kingdom) Robert Lambert
26–27	Motorcycle Racing	(Italy) 2026 WSBK Italian round	International	R1: (Spain) Iker Lecuona ( (Italy) Aruba.it Racing - Ducati; SR: (Spain) Iker Lecuona ( (Italy) Aruba.it Racing - Ducati); R2: (Spain) Iker Lecuona ( (Italy) Aruba.it Racing - Ducati)
27	Triathlon	(Spain) 2026 World Triathlon Championship Series Final	International	Men: (Portugal) Vasco Vilaça; Women: (France) Cassandre Beaugrand
27	Endurance racing	(Japan) 2026 6 Hours of Fuji (WEC #7)	International	Hypercar: (Switzerland) Sébastien Buemi, (New Zealand) Brendon Hartley & (Japan) Ryō Hirakawa ( (Japan) Toyota Racing); LMGT3: (Brazil) Augusto Farfus, (Indonesia) Sean Gelael & (United Kingdom) Darren Leung ( (Belgium) Team WRT)
27	Marathon	(Germany) 2026 Berlin Marathon (WMM #5)	International	Men: (Ethiopia) Guye Adola; Women: (Ethiopia) Tigst Assefa
27–2 October	Sailing	(Portugal) 2026 Men's ILCA 6 World Championship	International	(Brazil) Francisco Dal Ri
27–10 October	Sport shooting	(Greece) 2026 European Shotgun Championships	Continental	Senior:Italy; Junior:Italy
30–11 October	Tennis	2026 China Open (WTA 1000 #9)	International	Men: (Serbia) Novak Djokovic; Women: (China) Zheng Qinwen

=== October ===
Date	Sport	Event/Venue	Status	Winner/s
1–4	Rallying	(Italy) 2026 Rally Italia Sardegna (WRC #13)	International	WRC: (Sweden) Oliver Solberg & (United Kingdom) Elliott Edmondson ( (Japan) Toyota Gazoo Racing WRT); WRC-2: (Finland) Roope Korhonen & (Finland) Anssi Viinikka ( (Finland) Rautio Motorsport); WRC-3: (France) Eric Royère & (Belgium) Maxime Andernack
1–11	Table Tennis	China Smash 2026 (Grand Smash #4)	International	Men: (Japan) Sora Matsushima; Women: (China) Wang Manyu
1–17	Swimming	(Azerbaijan) / (Uzbekistan) / (Kazakhstan) 2026 World Aquatics Swimming World Cup (Round #1/2/3)	International	R#1:United States; R#2:United States; R#3:Russia; Men's Overall: (South Africa) Pieter Coetze; Women's Overall: (Netherlands) Marrit Steenbergen
2	Speedway Racing	(Czech Republic) 2026 Speedway European Championship Final	International	(Denmark) Leon Madsen
2–4	Sambo	(Greece) 2026 World Cadets,Youth and Junior Sambo Championships	International	Russia
2-5	Pesäpallo	(Australia) 2026 Pesäpallo World Cup	International	Finland
2–7	Road bicycle racing	(Slovenia) 2026 European Road Championships	International	Spain
2-18	Roller sports	(Paraguay) 2026 World Skate Games	International	Italy
3–4	Motocross Racing	(France) 2026 Motocross des Nations	International	Belgium
3–4	Endurance racing	(China) 2026 GT World Challenge Asia (Beijing round #6)	International	R1: (Hong Kong) Liu Kai shun & (Japan) Takuro Shinohara ( (China) No. 96 Harmony Racing); R2: (France) Alessandro Ghiretti & (China) Huang Ruohan ( (Hong Kong) No. 911 Absolute Racing)
3	Mixed martial arts	(United States) UFC 332:Silva vs Wang	International	(Brazil) Natália Silva
4	Motorcycle racing	(Japan) 2026 Japanese motorcycle Grand Prix (MotoGP #16)	International	MotoGP: (Spain) Marc Márquez ( (Italy) Ducati Lenovo Team); Moto2: (Spain) Izan Guevara ( (Italy) Blu Cru Pramac Yamaha Moto2); Moto3: (Spain) David Almansa ( (Germany) Liqui Moly Dynavolt Intact GP)
4	Formula Racing	2026 Bahrain Grand Prix In Malaysia (F1 #4)(Rescheduled)	International	(Netherlands) Max Verstappen ( (Austria) Red Bull Racing-Red Bull Ford)
4–10	Judo	(Azerbaijan) 2026 World Judo Championships	International	Japan
6–16	Squash	(Egypt) 2026 CIB Egyptian Open (Diamond #1)	International	Men: (Peru) Diego Elías; Women: (Egypt) Amina Orfi
7–18	Tennis	(China) 2026 Rolex Shanghai Masters (ATP 1000 #7)	International	(Spain) Alejandro Davidovich Fokina
8–11	Taekwondo	(France) Paris 2026 World Taekwondo Grand Prix (GP #3)	International	Men:Iran; Women:China; Overall:Iran & Brazil
9–11	Road Cycling	(China) 2026 Tour of Chongming Island (WWT #26)	International	(Netherlands) Lorena Wiebes(Team SD Worx-Protime)
9–11	Canoe	(Spain) 2026 ICF Canoe Ocean Racing World Championships	International	Men: (Germany) Gordan Harbrecht; Women: (Australia) Jemma Smith
9-28 November	Baseball	(China) / (Spain) 2027 WBSC Premier12 qualification	International	
10	Boxing	(United States) Sergio Mendoza vs. Ricardo Sandoval	International	(Mexico) Sergio Mendoza (WBA & WBC flyweight world titles)
10	Triathlon	(United States) 2026 Ironman World Championships	International	Men: (France) Vincent Luis; Women: (United States) Taylor Knibb
10–11	Gravel cycling	(Australia) 2026 UCI Gravel World Championships	International	Men: (Denmark) Magnus Bak Klaris; Women: (Netherlands) Marianne Vos
10–11	Motorcycle Racing	(Portugal) 2026 WSBK Estoril round	International	R1: (Italy) Nicolò Bulega ( (Italy) Aruba.it Racing - Ducati); SR: (Italy) Nicolò Bulega ( (Italy) Aruba.it Racing - Ducati); R2: (Italy) Nicolò Bulega ( (Italy) Aruba.it Racing - Ducati)
10	Road Cycling	(Italy) Il Lombardia (UWT #35)	International	(France) Paul Seixas(Decathlon CMA CGM Team)
11	Formula Racing	2026 Singapore Grand Prix (F1) #18	International	(Netherlands) Max Verstappen ( (Austria) Red Bull Racing-Red Bull Ford)
11	Motorcycle racing	(Indonesia) 2026 Indonesian motorcycle Grand Prix (MotoGP #17)	International	MotoGP: (Italy) Marco Bezzecchi ( (Italy) Aprilia Racing); Moto2: (Spain) Izan Guevara ( (Italy) Blu Cru Pramac Yamaha Moto2); Moto3: (Spain) Máximo Quiles ( (Spain) CFMoto Aspar Team)
11	Marathon	(United States) 2026 Chicago Marathon (WMM #6)	International	Men: (Kenya) Amos Kipruto; Women: (Ethiopia) Hawi Feysa
11–13	Rowing	(China) 2026 World Rowing Coastal Championships	International	United States
11–17	Softball	(China) 2026 U-15 Women's Softball Asia Cup	Continental	Japan
11–18	Table tennis	(Slovenia) 2026 European Table Tennis Championships	Continental	Men: (France) Félix Lebrun; Women: (Individual Neutral Athletes) Elizabet Abraamian
12–18	Badminton	(Egypt) 2026 BWF World Junior Championships	International	Men: (Indonesia) Radithya Bayu Wardana; Women: (China) Zhang Yixin; Team (Suhandinata Cup):China
12–18	Tennis	(China) 2026 Wuhan Open (WTA 1000 #10)	International	(Poland) Maja Chwalińska
12–18	Wrestling	(United States) 2026 U23 World Wrestling Championships	International	Men's freestyle:Iran; Men's Greco-Roman:Iran; Women's freestyle:Ukraine
12–19	Weightlifting	(Albania) 2026 European Junior and U23 Weightlifting Championships	Continental	U23:Ukraine (men) & Poland (women); Junior:Turkey (men) & Belarus (women)
12–21	Bowling	(Germany) 2026 IBF World Championships	International	Men's Singles: (Hong Kong) Jovi Ma; Women's Singles: (France) Manon Clément; Men's Team:France; Women's Team:Denmark
13-24	CP Football	(United States) 2026 IFCPF Men's World Cup	International	England
13–18	Badminton	2026 Denmark Open (Super 750 #5)	International	Men: (France) Alex Lanier; Women: (South Korea) An Se-young
13–18	Road Cycling	(China) 2026 Tour of Guangxi (UWT #36)	International	(Belgium) Jarno Widar (Lotto–Intermarché)
14–17	Baseball5	(Venezuela) 2026 Baseball5 Pan American Championship	Continental	Venezuela
14–17	Baseball5	(Venezuela) 2026 Youth Baseball5 Pan American Championship	Continental	Cuba
14–18	Track cycling	(China) 2026 UCI Track Cycling World Championships	International	Great Britain
14–23	CP Football	(United States) 2026 IFCPF Women's World Cup	International	United States
15–15 November	Rugby League	(Australia) (New Zealand) (Papua New Guinea) 2026 Men's Rugby League World Cup	International	Australia
15–2 June 2027	Association football	2026–27 UEFA Conference League season	Continental	
16–15 November	Rugby League	(Australia) (New Zealand) (Papua New Guinea) 2026 Women's Rugby League World Cup	International	Australia
16–20	Climbing	(United States) 2026 World Climbing Series (WCS#12)	International	Men's Bouldering: (Israel) Yonatan Katz; Women's Bouldering: (France) Oriane Bertone
16–24	Racquetball	(Chile) 2026 IRF Racquetball World Championships	International	Men: (Bolivia) Conrrado Moscoso; Women: (Argentina) Maria Jose Vargas
16–24	Handball	(Morocco) 2026 IHF Women's U16 Handball World Championship	International	Germany
16–25	Surfing	MEO Rip Curl Pro Portugal (WSL #10)	International	Men: (United States) Griffin Colapinto; Women: (Australia) Molly Picklum
16–27	Amateur boxing	(Montenegro) 2026 World Boxing U19 Championships	International	Men:Uzbekistan; Women:Russia; Overall:Russia
17	Boxing	(England) Daniel Dubois vs. Fabio Wardley	International	(United Kingdom) Daniel Dubois (WBO heavyweight world title)
17–18	Motorcycle Racing	(Spain) 2026 WSBK Spanish round	International	R1: (Italy) Nicolò Bulega ( (Italy) Aruba.it Racing - Ducati); SR: (Italy) Nicolò Bulega ( (Italy) Aruba.it Racing - Ducati); R2: (Italy) Nicolò Bulega ( (Italy) Aruba.it Racing - Ducati)
17–25	Artistic gymnastics	(Netherlands) 2026 World Artistic Gymnastics Championships	International	United States
17–25	Amateur boxing	(Mexico) 2026 Pan American Boxing Championships	Continental	Canada
17–7 November	Association football	(Morocco) 2026 FIFA U-17 Women's World Cup	International	Nigeria
17–8 May 2027	Association football	2026–27 AFC Challenge League season		
18–24	Multi-sport	(Japan) 2026 Asian Para Games	Continental	China
18–25	Table tennis	(Peru) 2026 Pan American Table Tennis Championships	Continental	Men: (Brazil) Hugo Calderano; Women: (Puerto Rico) Adriana Diaz
18	Endurance racing	(Spain) 2026 6 hours of Barcelona (WEC #7)	International	Hypercar: (Switzerland) Sébastien Buemi, (New Zealand) Brendon Hartley & (Japan) Ryō Hirakawa ( (Japan) Toyota Racing); LMGT3: (Austria) Richard Lietz, (Italy) Riccardo Pera & (Australia) Yasser Shahin ( (Germany) The Bend Manthey)
18	Road Cycling	(China) 2026 Tour of Guangxi (WWT #27)	International	Race cancelled
18–25	Table tennis	(Morocco) 2026 African Table Tennis Championships	Continental	Men: (Egypt) Youssef Abdelaziz; Women: (Egypt) Hana Goda
19–25	Table tennis	(Uzbekistan) 2026 Asian Table Tennis Championships	Continental	Men: (Japan) Tomokazu Harimoto; Women: (China) Chen Yi
20–24	Squash	(United States) 2026 Silicon Valley Open (Gold #2)	International	Men: (Egypt) Mohamed Zakaria; Women: (Malaysia) Sivasangari Subramaniam
20–25	Badminton	(France) 2026 French Open (Super 750 #6)	International	Men: (France) Christo Popov; Women: (South Korea) An Se-young
21	Association football	(United States) 2026 U.S. Open Cup finals	Domestic	(Missouri) St. Louis City SC
21	Association football	(Canada) 2026 Canadian Championship final	Domestic	(Ontario) Forge FC
22–29	Baseball	(Dominican Republic) 2026 U-18 Pan American Baseball Championship	Continental	United States
23–31	Baseball	(United States) 2026 World Series	Domestic	Milwaukee Brewers
23	Wrestling	(United States) RAF 14:Tsarukyan vs Danis	International	(Armenia) Arman Tsarukyan
23–25	Climbing	(Chile) 2026 World Climbing Series (WCS#13)	International	Men's Speed: (China) Zhao Yicheng; Women's Speed: (China) Deng Lijuan; Men's Lead: (Switzerland) Jonas Utelli; Women's Lead: (Slovenia) Janja Garnbret
23–25	Figure Skating	2026 Grand Prix de France (GP #1)	International	Men's singles: (France) Adam Siao Him Fa; Women's singles: (Japan) Ami Nakai; Pairs: (Georgia (country)) Anastasiia Metelkina/Luka Berulava; Ice dance: (France) Laurence Fournier Beaudry/Guillaume Cizeron
24	Boxing	(England) Dalton Smith vs. Alberto Puello	International	(United Kingdom) Dalton Smith (WBC light-welterweight world title)
24	Mixed Martial Arts	(United Arab Emirates) UFC 333:Volkanovski vs Evloev	International	(Australia) Alexander Volkanovski
24	Boxing	(United States) O’Shaquie Foster vs Emanuel Navarrete	International	(United States) O'Shaquie Foster (WBC, IBF & WBO Super-featherweight World titles)
24–25	Alpine Ski	(Austria) 2026 Rettenbach Ski World Cup (Ski WC men/women #Stage 1/1)	International	Men's Giant Slalom: (Brazil) Lucas Pinheiro Braathen; Women's Giant Slalom: (United States) Paula Moltzan
24–1 November	Wrestling	(Kazakhstan) 2026 World Wrestling Championships	International	Men's Freestyle:United States; Men's Greco-Roman:Iran; Women's Freestyle:United States
25	Motorcycle racing	(Australia) 2026 Australian motorcycle Grand Prix (MotoGP #18)	International	MotoGP/Moto2/Moto3:All races were cancelled due to inclement weather and poor visibility.
25	Formula Racing	2026 United States Grand Prix (F1) #19	International	(Italy) Kimi Antonelli ( (Germany) Mercedes)
25	Ice hockey	(Canada) 2026 NHL Heritage Classic	Domestic	(Quebec) Montreal Canadiens
27–8 November	Weightlifting	(China) 2026 World Weightlifting Championships	International	Men:North Korea; Women:China
27–1 November	Table Tennis	(France) WTT Champions Montpellier 2026 (WTT Champions #5)	International	Men: (South Korea) Jang Woojin; Women: (China) Sun Yingsha
27–1 November	Curling	(Czech Republic) 2026 European Curling Championships	Continental	Men:Scotland; Women:Sweden
29–31	Judo	(United Arab Emirates) 2026 Judo Grand Slam Abu Dhabi (GS #9)	International	Azerbaijan
29–1 November	Para cycling	(Netherlands) 2026 UCI Para-cycling Track World Championships	International	Great Britain
30–1 November	Figure skating	2026 Skate Canada International (GP #2)	International	Men's Singles: (France) Kevin Aymoz; Women's Singles: (Japan) Mao Shimada; Pairs: (Canada) Lia Pereira/Trennt Michaud; Ice dance: (United Kingdom) Lilah Fear/Lewis Gibson
30–1 November	Judo	(Italy) 2026 European U23 Judo Championships	Continental	Azerbaijan
30–13 November	Rugby League	(Australia) 2026 Wheelchair Rugby League World Cup	International	England
31–8 November	Tennis	(France) 2026 Rolex Paris Masters (ATP 1000 #8)	International	(Spain) Carlos Alcaraz
31–13 November	Multi-sport	(Senegal) 2026 Summer Youth Olympics	International	China
31–10 November	Surfing	Philippines Pro (WSL #11)	International	Men: (Brazil) Gabriel Medina; Women: (United States) Caitlin Simmers
31–1 November	BMX Racing	(United States) 2026 UCI BMX Racing World Cup Final	International	Men: (Netherlands) Jaymio Brink; Women: (Netherlands) Laura Smulders
31–7 November	Snooker	(China) 2026 World Snooker Tour - International Championship	International	(England) Kyren Wilson

=== November ===
Date	Sport	Venue/Event	Status	Winner/s
1	Motorcycle racing	(Malaysia) 2026 Malaysian motorcycle Grand Prix (MotoGP #19)	International	MotoGP: (Spain) Marc Márquez ( (Italy) Ducati Lenovo Team); Moto2: (Colombia) David Alonso ( (Spain) CFMoto RCB Aspar Team); Moto3: (Spain) Máximo Quiles ( (Spain) CFMoto Gaviota Aspar Team)
1	Marathon	(United States) 2026 New York City Marathon (WMM #7)	International	Men: (Sweden) Andreas Almgren; Women: (Kenya) Sheila Chepkirui
1–7	Mixed Martial Arts	(Georgia (country)) 2026 IMMAF World Championships	International	Senior:Russia; Junior:Russia
1–14	Shooting	(Qatar) 2026 ISSF World Shooting Championships for Rifle/Pistol/Shotgun	International	China
1	Formula racing	2026 Mexico City Grand Prix (F1 #20)	International	(Netherlands) Max Verstappen ( (Austria) Red Bull Racing-Red Bull Ford)
3–7	Urban Cycling	(Saudi Arabia) 2026 UCI Urban Cycling World Championships	International	Cancelled due to 2026 Iran war
3–8	Table Tennis	(Germany) WTT Champions Frankfurt 2026 (WTT Champions #6)	International	Men: (Japan) Tomokazu Harimoto; Women: (Japan) Hina Hayata
4–18	Lacrosse	(Spain) 2026 European Sixes Lacrosse Championships	Continental	Men:Great Britain; Women:Israel
5–8	Trampoline	(China) 2026 Trampoline Gymnastics World Championships	International	Russia
6–7	Horse racing	(United States) 2026 Breeders' Cup	International	
6–8	Figure Skating	2026 Cup of China (GP #3)	International	Men's singles: (Japan) Kao Miura; Women's singles: (Japan) Mone Chiba; Pairs: (Individual Neutral Athletes) Anastasia Mishina/Aleksandr Galliamov; Ice dance: (United Kingdom) Lilah Fear/Lewis Gibson
6–8	Sambo	(Uzbekistan) 2026 World Sambo Championships	International	Russia
6–15	Baseball	(Nicaragua) 2026 U-23 Baseball World Cup	International	Venezuela
6–15	Surfing	(Peru) 2026 ISA World Surf Games	International	Men: (Australia) Ethan Ewing; Women: (Australia) Leihan Zoric
6–16	Ice Hockey	(Denmark) 2026 IIHF Women's World Championship	International	United States
8	Endurance racing	(Italy) 2026 6 Hours of Monza (WEC #8)	International	Hypercar: (United Kingdom) Jack Aitken, (New Zealand) Earl Bamber & (France) Sébastien Bourdais ( (United States) Cadillac Hertz Team Jota); LMGT3: (Austria) Richard Lietz, (Italy) Riccardo Pera & (Australia) Yasser Shahin ( (Germany) The Bend Manthey)
8	Motorcycle racing	2026 Qatar motorcycle Grand Prix (MotoGP #20)	International	MotoGP: (Italy) Marco Bezzecchi ( (Italy) Aprilia Racing); Moto2: (Spain) Daniel Holgado ( (Spain) CFMoto Power Electronics Aspar Team); Moto3: (Spain) David Almansa ( (Germany) Liqui Moly Dynavolt Intact GP)
8	Formula racing	(Brazil) 2026 Sao Paulo Grand Prix (F1) #21	International	(United Kingdom) Lando Norris ( (United Kingdom) McLaren)
8–9	Cyclo-cross	(Belgium) 2026 UEC Cyclo-cross European Championships	International	Men: (Belgium) Thibau Nys; Women: (Netherlands) Lucinda Brand
8–15	Tennis	(United States) 2026 WTA Finals	International	Singles: Mirra Andreeva; Doubles: (United States) Taylor Townsend/ (Czech Republic) Kateřina Siniaková
10–21	Chess	(Hungary) Total Chess World Championship 2026	International	(France) Alireza Firouzja
13–22	Amputee football	(Mexico) 2026 Amputee Football World Cup	International	
13–15	Figure Skating	(United States) 2026 Skate America (GP #4)	International	Men's Singles: (United States) Ilia Malinin; Women's Singles: (Japan) Ami Nakai; Pairs: (Germany) Minerva Fabienne Hase/Nikita Volodin; Ice dance: (United States) Emilea Zingas/Vadym Kolesnik
13–15	Judo	(Croatia) 2026 Judo Grand Prix Zagreb (GP #4)	International	Brazil
14	Mixed Martial Arts	(United States) UFC 334:Gane vs Hokit UFC 334:Harrison vs Nunes	International	(France) Ciryl Gane; (United States) Kayla Harrison
14	Wrestling	(United Arab Emirates) RAF Abu Dhabi:Chimaev vs Covington	International	(United Arab Emirates) Khamzat Chimaev
14–25	Boxing	(Croatia) 2026 European U23 Boxing Championships	Continental	
15	Motorcycle racing	(Portugal) 2026 Portuguese motorcycle Grand Prix (MotoGP #21)	International	MotoGP: Moto2: Moto3:
15	Canadian football	(Canada) 113th Grey Cup	Domestic	
15–22	Tennis	(Italy) 2026 ATP Finals	International	
19–22	Judo	(Uzbekistan) 2026 World Judo Juniors Championships	International	Russia
19–13 December	Association football	(Qatar) 2026 FIFA U-17 World Cup	International	
20–27	Baseball	(Dominican Republic) 2026 U-12 Pan American Baseball Championship	Continental	
20–22	Figure Skating	(Finland) 2026 Finlandia Trophy (GP #5)	International	
21	Formula Racing	(United States) 2026 Las Vegas Grand Prix (F1) #22	International	
21–22	Sailing	(United Arab Emirates) 2026 Emirates Dubai Sail Grand Prix (SailGP #12)	International	
21–28	Table tennis	(Turkey) 2026 ITTF World Youth Championships	International	
22	Motorcycle racing	2026 Valencian Community motorcycle Grand Prix (MotoGP #22)	International	MotoGP: Moto2: Moto3:
23–29	Teqball	2026 Teqball World Championships	International	
24–29	Tennis	(Italy) 2026 Davis Cup Finals	International	
24–12 December	Chess	(Switzerland) 2026 World Chess Championship	International	
26–4 December	Amateur boxing	(Uzbekistan) 2026 World Boxing Cup Finals	International	
27–29	Figure Skating	(Japan) 2026 NHK Trophy (GP #6)	International	
28	Association football	(Uruguay) 2026 Copa Libertadores final	Continental	
28	Wrestling	(United States) RAF 15	International	
28–29	Sailing	(United Arab Emirates) Mubadala Abu Dhabi Sail Grand Prix 2026 Season Grand Final (SailGP #13)	International	
28–29	Taekwondo	(Kazakhstan) 2026 World Taekwondo Grand Prix Final (GP #4)	International	Men: Women: Overall:
29	Formula Racing	2026 Qatar Grand Prix (F1) #23	International	
29	Rugby Union	(England) 2026 Nations Championship Final	Multi-continental	
29–6 December	Table tennis	(China) 2026 ITTF Mixed Team World Cup	International	
30–6 December	Bowls	(Hong Kong) 2026 World Bowls Junior Indoor Championship	International	

=== December ===
Date	Sport	Venue/Event	Status	Winner/s
1–6	Swimming	(China) 2026 World Aquatics Swimming Championships(25m)	International	
3–8	Shooting	(Italy) 2026 ISSF World Cup Final for Rifle/Pistol/Shotgun	International	China
3–20	Handball	(Czech Republic) / (Poland) / (Romania) / (Slovakia) / (Turkey) 2026 European Women's Handball Championship	Continental	
4–6	Motorcycle racing	(Thailand) 2026 ARRC Chang round	International	R1: R2:
5–6	Judo	(Japan) 2026 Judo Grand Slam Tokyo (GS #10)	International	
6	Formula Racing	(United Arab Emirates) 2026 Abu Dhabi Grand Prix (F1) #24	International	
6	Association football	(Brazil) 2026 Copa do Brasil final	Domestic	
7–13	Volleyball	(Brazil) 2026 FIVB Volleyball Women's Club World Championship	International	
7–13	Badminton	(China) 2026 BWF World Tour Finals	International	
8–20	Surfing	(Hawaii) Lexus Pipe Masters (WSL #12)	International	Men: Women;
8–27 June 2026	Field Hockey	(Argentina) (Spain) / (India) (Australia) / (Belgium) (Germany) (Netherlands) 2026–27 Men's FIH Pro League (Argentina) (Spain) / (Argentina) (India) (Australia) / (Belgium) (Germany) (Netherlands) 2026–27 Women's FIH Pro League	International	Men: Women:
9–13	Baseball5	(Puerto Rico) 2026 Baseball5 World Cup	International	
9–13	Table Tennis	(Hong Kong) 2026 WTT Finals	International	Men: Women:
10–13	Figure Skating	(China) 2026–27 Grand Prix Final (GP #7)	International	
11–3 January	Darts	(England) 2026 PDC World Darts Championships	International	
12–13	Taekwondo	(China) 2026 World Taekwondo Grand Slam Champions Series	International	
13	Association football	(Argentina) 2026 Liga Profesional de Fútbol Tornea Clausura final	Domestic	
13	Athletics	(Serbia) 2026 European Cross-country Championships	Continental	
13–21	Multi-sport	(Saudi Arabia) 2026 Asian Indoor and Martial Arts Games	Continental	
14–20	Volleyball	(Poland) 2026 FIVB Volleyball Men's Club World Championship	International	
18	Association football	(United States) 2026 MLS Cup	Binational	
26–5 January 2027	Ice Hockey	(Canada) 2027 World Junior Ice Hockey Championships	International	

== Multi-sport events ==
- January 20–26: 2025 ASEAN Para Games in (Thailand) Nakhon Ratchasima province
- February 6–22: 2026 Winter Olympics in (Italy) Milan and Cortina d'Ampezzo
- March 6–15: 2026 Winter Paralympics in (Italy) Milan and Cortina d'Ampezzo
- April 12–25: 2026 South American Youth Games in Panama City
- April 22–30: 2026 Asian Beach Games in (China) Sanya
- July 23 – August 2: 2026 Commonwealth Games in (Scotland) Glasgow
- July 24 – August 8: 2026 Central American and Caribbean Games in (Dominican Republic) Santo Domingo
- August 21 – September 3: 2026 Mediterranean Games in (Italy) Taranto
- September 12–26: 2026 South American Games in (Argentina) Rosario, Santa Fe, and Rafaela
- September 19 – October 4: 2026 Asian Games in (Japan) Nagoya
- October 18 – 24: 2026 Asian Para Games in (Japan) Nagoya
- October 31 – November 13: 2026 Summer Youth Olympics in (Senegal) Dakar
- November 20 – December 12: 2026 Vietnam National Games in Ho Chi Minh City
- TBA
  - 2026 Indonesian Celebrity Sports Tournament
  - 2026 Palarong Pambansa in (Philippines) Prosperidad

== American football ==
=== National Football League ===
- February 3: 2026 Pro Bowl Games in San Francisco, California
- February 8: Super Bowl LX in Santa Clara, California
  - (Washington (state)) Seattle Seahawks defeated (Massachusetts) New England Patriots, 29–13
- April 23–25: 2026 NFL draft in Pittsburgh, Pennsylvania
- September 9, 2026 – January 10, 2027: 2026 NFL season

=== United Football League ===
- January 9–14: 2026 UFL draft
- March 27 – May 31: 2026 UFL season
- June 13: 2026 United Bowl in (Washington, D.C.) Washington, D.C.
  - (Kentucky) Louisville Kings defeated (Washington, D.C.) DC Defenders, 27–20
- November 18: 2027 UFL draft in St. Louis, Missouri

=== European Football Alliance ===
- May 15 – August 9: 2026 European Football Alliance season
- August 29: 2026 EFA Championship Game in Innsbruck, Austria
  - (Denmark) Nordic Storm defeated (Germany) Munich Ravens, 48–28

== Association football ==
=== FIFA tournaments ===
- 8 October 2025 – 1 February 2026: 2026 FIFA Women's Champions Cup
- ~~27 March: 2026 Finalissima~~ (cancelled)
- 9–18 April: 2026 FIFA Series
- 11 June–19 July: 2026 FIFA World Cup (co-host United States/ Canada/ Mexico)
- 5–27 September: 2026 FIFA U-20 Women's World Cup in Poland
- 17 October–7 November: 2026 FIFA U-17 Women's World Cup in Morocco
- 19 November–13 December: 2026 FIFA U-17 World Cup in Qatar

=== AFC ===
- 2026 AFC Women's Asian Cup in Australia
- 2026 AFC Futsal Asian Cup in Indonesia
- 2026 AFC U-23 Asian Cup in Saudi Arabia

=== CAF ===
- 2025 Africa Cup of Nations in Morocco (part of the tournament was in 2026)
- 2026 CAF Champions League

=== CONCACAF ===
- 2026 CONCACAF Champions Cup
- 2026–27 CONCACAF Nations League

=== CONMEBOL ===
- 2026 Superclásico de las Américas in Tokyo, Japan

==== Club competitions ====
- 2026 Copa Libertadores TBA
- 2026 Copa Sudamericana TBA
- 2026 Recopa Sudamericana TBA

=== UEFA ===
- 20 May: 2026 UEFA Europa League final in Istanbul, Turkey
- 23 May: 2026 UEFA Women's Champions League final in Oslo, Norway
- 27 May: 2026 UEFA Conference League final in Leipzig, Germany
- 30 May: 2026 UEFA Champions League final in Budapest, Hungary

=== Futsal ===
- 21 January - 7 February: UEFA Futsal Euro 2026 in Latvia, Lithuania, and Slovenia

== Athletics ==
- March 14–15: World University Cross Country Championships in Italy
- March 20–22: 2026 World Athletics Indoor Championships in Poland
- April 12: 2026 World Athletics Race Walking Team Championships in Brazil
- May 2–3: 2026 World Athletics Relays in Botswana
- August 5–9: 2026 World Athletics U20 Championships in United States
- September 19–20: 2026 World Athletics Road Running Championships in Denmark

=== Asian Athletics ===
- February 6–8: 2026 Asian Indoor Athletics Championships in China
- March 15: Asian Race Walking Championships in Japan

=== European Athletics ===
- May 30: European Challenger Championships in Monaco
- July 16–19: 2026 European Athletics U18 Championships in Italy
- August 10–16: 2026 European Athletics Championships in United Kingdom
- December 13: 2026 European Cross Country Championships in Serbia

=== Oceania Athletics ===
- May 18–23: 2026 Oceania Athletics Championships in Australia
- May 18–23: 2026 Oceania U18 Athletics Championships in Australia

=== 2026 Diamond League ===
- May 8: Doha Diamond League in Qatar
- May 16: Shanghai Diamond League in China
- May 23: Xiamen Diamond League in China
- May 31: Meeting International Mohammed VI d'Athlétisme de Rabat in Morocco
- June 4: Golden Gala in Italy
- June 7: BAUHAUS-galan in Sweden
- June 10: Bislett Games in Norway
- June 26: Meeting de Paris in France
- July 4: Prefontaine Classic in United States
- July 10: Meeting Herculis in Monaco
- July 18: London Athletics Meet in United Kingdom
- August 21: Athletissima in Switzerland
- August 23: Kamila Skolimowska Memorial in Poland
- August 27: Weltklasse Zürich in Switzerland
- September 4–5: Memorial Van Damme in Belgium (finals)

=== 2025–2026 World Athletics Cross Country Tour ===
Gold

- October 19, 2025: Cross Zornotza in Spain
  - Winners: (Burundi) Emile Hafashimana (m) / (Ethiopia) Likina Amebaw (f)
- November 8, 2025: Cardiff Cross Challenge in United Kingdom
  - Winners: (Kenya) Mathew Kipsang (m) / (Kenya) Cynthia Chepkirui (f)
- November 9, 2025: Cross Internacional de Itálica in Spain
  - Winners: (Burundi) Rodrigue Kwizera (m) / (Bahrain) Winfred Yavi (f)
- November 16, 2025: Cross Internacional de Soria in Spain
  - Winners: (Kenya) Mathew Kipsang (m) / (Ethiopia) Likina Amebaw (f)
- November 23, 2025: Cinque Mulini in Italy
- November 23, 2025: Cross de Atapuerca in Spain
- November 23, 2025: Cross d'Allonnes in France
- November 30, 2025: Cross Internacional de la Constitución in Spain
- December 6, 2025: The Great Chepsaita Cross Country in Kenya
- December 21, 2025: Cross Internacional de Venta de Baños in Spain
- January 18: Juan Muguerza Cross-Country in Spain
- January 25: Campaccio in Italy
- January 25: Lotto Cross Cup de Hannut in Belgium
- February 14: Sirikwa Classic Continental Tour Gold in Kenya (final)

Silver

- September 27, 2025: Lidingöloppet in Sweden
  - Winners: (Kenya) William Nyarondia (m) / (Sweden) Carolina Johnson (f)
- November 2, 2025: Cross de San Sebastián in Spain
  - Winners: (Kenya) Titus Kibet (m) / (Kenya) Celestine Biwot (f)
- November 15, 2025: Cross Pforzheim in Germany
  - Winners: (Germany) Markus Gröger (m) / (Germany) Elena Burkard (f)
- November 30, 2025: International Warandecross Tilburg in Netherlands
- December 28, 2025: Cross Internacional de Amurrio in Spain
- February 1: Gran Premio Cáceres de la Diputación de Cáceres in Spain (final)

Bronze

- October 19, 2025: Autumn Open International Cross Country Festival in Ireland
  - Winners: (Republic of Ireland) Callum Morgan (m) / (Republic of Ireland) Fiona Everard (f)
- November 2, 2025: Cross della Valsugana in Italy
  - Winners: (Italy) Sebastiano Parolini (m) / (Portugal) Laura Taborda (f)
- November 30, 2025: Carsolina Cross in Italy
- December 13, 2025: Botswana International Cross Country in Botswana
- December 31, 2025: Intersport Sylvestercross in Netherlands
- January 11: Cross della Vallagarina in Italy
- March 7: White Cross in Serbia (final)

== Badminton ==
=== Major championships ===
- April 24 – May 3 : 2026 Thomas & Uber Cup in Horsens, Denmark
  - Thomas Cup : China
  - Uber Cup : South Korea
- August 17 – 23 : 2026 BWF World Championships in New Delhi, India
  - Men's singles : (France) Alex Lanier
  - Women's singles : (South Korea) An Se-young
  - Men's doubles : (China) Liang Weikeng / Wang Chang
  - Women's doubles : (South Korea) Baek Ha-na / Lee So-hee
  - Mixed doubles : (France) Thom Gicquel / Delphine Delrue

=== Continental championships ===
- February 3 – 8 : 2026 Badminton Asia Team Championships in Qingdao, China
  - Men's team : Japan
  - Women's team : South Korea
- February 8 – 12 : 2026 Oceania Badminton Championships in Auckland, New Zealand
  - Men's singles : (Australia) Shrey Dhand
  - Women's singles : (New Zealand) Shaunna Li
  - Men's doubles : (Australia) Rizky Hidayat / Jack Yu
  - Women's doubles : (Australia) Gronya Somerville / Angela Yu
  - Mixed doubles : (Australia) Andika Ramadiansyah / Angela Yu
- February 9 – 12 : 2026 All Africa Men's and Women's Team Badminton Championships in Gaborone, Botswana
  - Men's team : Algeria
  - Women's team : South Africa
- February 11 – 15 : 2026 European Men's and Women's Team Badminton Championships in Istanbul, Turkey
  - Men's team : France
  - Women's team : Bulgaria
- February 12 – 15 : 2026 Pan Am Male & Female Badminton Cup in Guatemala City, Guatemala
  - Men's team : Canada
  - Women's team : Canada
- February 13 – 15 : 2026 Oceania Men's & Women's Team Badminton Championships in Auckland, New Zealand
  - Men's team : Australia
  - Women's team : Australia
- February 13 – 15 : 2026 African Badminton Championships in Gaborone, Botswana
  - Men's singles : (Egypt) Adham Hatem Elgamal
  - Women's singles : (Uganda) Fadilah Mohamed Rafi
  - Men's doubles : (Algeria) Koceila Mammeri / Youcef Sabri Medel
  - Women's doubles : (South Africa) Amy Ackerman / Johanita Scholtz
  - Mixed doubles : (Algeria) Koceila Mammeri / Tanina Mammeri
- April 6 – 12 : 2026 European Badminton Championships in Huelva, Spain
  - Men's singles : (France) Christo Popov
  - Women's singles : (Scotland) Kirsty Gilmour
  - Men's doubles : (England) Ben Lane / Sean Vendy
  - Women's doubles : (Bulgaria) Gabriela Stoeva / Stefani Stoeva
  - Mixed doubles : (Denmark) Mathias Christiansen / Alexandra Bøje
- April 7 – 10 : Pan Am Individual Championships 2026 in Aguascalientes, Mexico
  - Men's singles : (Canada) Victor Lai
  - Women's singles : (Canada) Michelle Li
  - Men's doubles : (United States) Chen Zhi-yi / Presley Smith
  - Women's doubles : (United States) Lauren Lam / Allison Lee
  - Mixed doubles : (United States) Presley Smith / Jennie Gai
- April 7 – 12 : 2026 Badminton Asia Championships in Ningbo, China
  - Men's singles : (China) Shi Yuqi
  - Women's singles : (South Korea) An Se-young
  - Men's doubles : (South Korea) Kim Won-ho / Seo Seung-jae
  - Women's doubles : (China) Li Yijing / Luo Xumin
  - Mixed doubles : (South Korea) Kim Jae-hyeon / Jang Ha-jeong

=== BWF World Tour ===
==== BWF World Tour Finals ====
- December 9 – 13 : 2026 BWF World Tour Finals in Hangzhou, China

==== Super 1000 ====
- January 6 – 11 : 2026 Malaysia Open
  - Men's singles : (Thailand) Kunlavut Vitidsarn
  - Women's singles : (South Korea) An Se-young
  - Men's doubles : (South Korea) Kim Won-ho / Seo Seung-jae
  - Women's doubles : (China) Liu Shengshu / Tan Ning
  - Mixed doubles : (China) Feng Yanzhe / Huang Dongping
- March 3 – 8 : 2026 All England Open
  - Men's singles : (Chinese Taipei) Lin Chun-yi
  - Women's singles : (China) Wang Zhiyi
  - Men's doubles : (South Korea) Kim Won-ho / Seo Seung-jae
  - Women's doubles : (China) Liu Shengshu / Tan Ning
  - Mixed doubles : (Chinese Taipei) Ye Hong-wei / Nicole Gonzales Chan
- June 2 – 7 : 2026 Indonesia Open
  - Men's singles : (Canada) Victor Lai
  - Women's singles : (South Korea) An Se-young
  - Men's doubles : (Malaysia) Goh Sze Fei / Nur Izzuddin
  - Women's doubles : (Japan) Yuki Fukushima / Mayu Matsumoto
  - Mixed doubles : (Denmark) Mathias Christiansen / Alexandra Bøje
- July 21 – 26 : 2026 China Open
  - Men's singles : (Chinese Taipei) Chou Tien-chen
  - Women's singles : (Japan) Akane Yamaguchi
  - Men's doubles : (Indonesia) Fajar Alfian / Muhammad Shohibul Fikri
  - Women's doubles : (China) Liu Shengshu / Tan Ning
  - Mixed doubles : (China) Guo Xinwa / Chen Fanghui

== Baseball ==
=== WBSC ===
- March 5–17: 2026 World Baseball Classic in Japan, Puerto Rico, and the United States
  - Venezuela defeated the United States, 3–2

=== Major League Baseball ===
- The Los Angeles Dodgers have now been playing in Los Angeles longer than in their original home in Brooklyn.
- March 26 – September 27: 2026 Major League Baseball season
- July 12–13: 2026 Major League Baseball draft in Philadelphia, Pennsylvania
- July 14: 2026 Major League Baseball All-Star Game at Citizens Bank Park in Philadelphia, Pennsylvania
- October 23–28: 2026 World Series
  - The (Wisconsin) Milwaukee Brewers defeat the (Florida) Tampa Bay Rays, 4–1 in games played, to win their first World Series title.

=== 2026 Little League World Series ===
- August 20–30: Little League World Series at Little League Volunteer Stadium and Howard J. Lamade Stadium, both in South Williamsport, Pennsylvania

== Basketball ==
- June 1–7: 2026 FIBA 3x3 World Cup in Poland
- June 27 – July 5: 2026 FIBA Under-17 Basketball World Cup in Turkey
- July 11–19: 2026 FIBA Under-17 Women's Basketball World Cup in Czech Republic
- September 4–13: 2026 FIBA Women's Basketball World Cup in Germany

=== FIBA Africa ===
- August 5–16: 2026 FIBA U18 AfroBasket in Ivory Coast
- October 5–16: 2026 FIBA U18 Women's AfroBasket in Ivory Coast

=== FIBA Asia ===
- April 1–5: 2026 FIBA 3x3 Asia Cup in Singapore
- August 13–23: 2026 FIBA U18 Asia Cup in India
- October 4–10: 2026 FIBA U18 Women's Asia Cup in Malaysia

=== FIBA Europe ===
- August 7–15: 2026 FIBA U16 EuroBasket in Romania
- August 14–22: 2026 FIBA U16 Women's EuroBasket in Romania
- July 25 – August 2 : 2026 FIBA U18 EuroBasket in Italy
- August 1–9: 2026 FIBA U18 Women's EuroBasket in Sweden
- July 11–19: 2026 FIBA U20 EuroBasket in Slovenia
- July 4–12: 2026 FIBA U20 Women's EuroBasket in Lithuania

=== National Basketball Association ===
- October 21, 2025 – April 12: 2025–26 NBA season
- February 15: 2026 NBA All-Star Game at Intuit Dome in Inglewood, California
- April 18 – June 13: 2026 NBA playoffs
  - (New York (state)) New York Knicks defeated (Texas) San Antonio Spurs, 4–1 in games played
- June 23–24: 2026 NBA draft
- October 20 – April 11, 2027: 2026–27 NBA season
- October 30 – December 11: 2026 NBA Cup

=== Women's National Basketball Association ===
- April 13: 2026 WNBA draft
- May 8 – September 24: 2026 WNBA season
- September 27 – October 31: 2026 WNBA playoffs

=== National Collegiate Athletic Association ===
- March 17 – April 6: 2026 NCAA Division I men's basketball tournament
- March 20 – April 5: 2026 NCAA Division I women's basketball tournament

== Canadian football ==
=== Canadian Football League ===
- April 28: 2026 CFL draft
- April 29: 2026 CFL global draft
- June 4 – October 24: 2026 CFL season
- November 15: 113th Grey Cup in Calgary, Alberta

=== U Sports ===
- November 28: 61st Vanier Cup in Quebec City, Quebec

== Cricket ==
Test cricket

- 2025–26 Ashes series in Australia

T20I

- ICC Men's T20 World Cup in India and Sri Lanka
- ICC Women's T20 World Cup in England and Wales

T20 Domestic

- BCCI Women's Premier League 2026 in India
- BCCI Indian Premier League 2026 in India

== Cycling ==
=== Road ===
==== 2026 UCI Road World Championships ====
- September 20: Individual Time Trial - Elite Women
- September 20: Individual Time Trial - Elite Men
- September 21: Individual Time Trial - Women's Under-23
- September 21: Individual Time Trial - Men's Under-23
- September 22: Individual Time Trial - Men's Junior
- September 22: Individual Time Trial - Women's Junior

==== 2026 UCI World Tour (men) ====
- January 20–25 (Australia) 2026 Tour Down Under (UWT #1):
  - General Classification: (Australia) Jay Vine(UAE Team Emirates XRG)
  - Sprint Classification: (Denmark) Tobias Lund Andresen(Decathlon CMA CGM)
  - Mountain Classification: (Norway) Martin Urianstad(Uno-X Mobility)
  - Young Rider Classification: (Italy) Andrea Raccagni(Soudal–Quick-Step)
  - Team Classification: Team Jayco–AlUla
- February 1 (Australia) 2026 Cadel Evans Great Ocean Road Race (UWT #2):
  - (Denmark) Tobias Lund Andresen(Decathlon CMA CGM)
- February 16–22 (United Arab Emirates) 2026 UAE Tour (UWT #3):
  - General Classification: (Mexico) Isaac del Toro(UAE Team Emirates XRG)
  - Points Classification: (Italy) Jonathan Milan(Lidl–Trek)
  - Sprint Classification: (Switzerland) Silvan Dillier(Alpecin–Premier Tech)
  - Young Rider Classification: (Mexico) Isaac del Toro(UAE Team Emirates XRG)
  - Team Classification: UAE Team Emirates XRG
- February 28 (Belgium) 2026 Omloop Het Nieuwsblad (UWT #4):
  - (Netherlands) Mathieu van der Poel(Alpecin–Premier Tech)
- March 7 (Italy) 2026 Strade Bianche (UWT #5):
  - (Slovenia) Tadej Pogačar(UAE Team Emirates XRG)
- March 8–15 (France) 2026 Paris–Nice (UWT #6):
  - General Classification: (Denmark) Jonas Vingegaard(Visma–Lease a Bike)
  - Points Classification: (Denmark) Jonas Vingegaard(Visma–Lease a Bike)
  - Mountain Classification: (Denmark) Jonas Vingegaard(Visma–Lease a Bike)
  - Young Rider Classification: (Germany) Georg Steinhauser(EF Education–EasyPost)
  - Team Classification: INEOS Grenadiers
- March 9–15 (Italy) 2026 Tirreno–Adriatico (UWT #7):
  - General Classification: (Mexico) Isaac del Toro(UAE Team Emirates XRG)
  - Points Classification: (Mexico) Isaac del Toro(UAE Team Emirates XRG)
  - Mountain Classification: (Spain) Diego Pablo Sevilla(Team Polti VisitMalta)
  - Young Rider Classification: Isaac del Toro(UAE Team Emirates XRG)
  - Team Classification: Red Bull–Bora–Hansgrohe
- March 21 (Italy) 2026 Milan–San Remo (UWT #8):
  - (Slovenia) Tadej Pogačar(UAE Team Emirates XRG)
- March 23–29 (Spain) 2026 Volta a Catalunya (UWT #9):
  - General Classification: (Denmark) Jonas Vingegaard(Visma–Lease a Bike)
  - Points Classification: (France) Dorian Godon(INEOS Grenadiers)
  - Mountain Classification: (Italy) Giulio Ciccone(Lidl–Trek)
  - Young Rider Classification: (France) Lenny Martinez(Team Bahrain Victorious)
  - Team Classification: Red Bull–Bora–Hansgrohe
- March 25 (Belgium) 2026 Tour of Bruges (UWT #10):
  - (Netherlands) Dylan Groenewegen(Unibet Rose Rockets)
- March 27 (Belgium) 2026 E3 Saxo Classic (UWT #11):
  - (Netherlands) Mathieu van der Poel(Alpecin–Premier Tech)
- March 29 (Belgium) 2026 Gent–Wevelgem (UWT #12):
  - (Belgium) Jasper Philipsen(Alpecin–Premier Tech)
- April 1 (Belgium) 2026 Dwars door Vlaanderen (UWT #13):
  - (Italy) Filippo Ganna(INEOS Grenadiers)
- April 5 (Belgium) 2026 Tour of Flanders (UWT #14):
  - (Slovenia) Tadej Pogačar(UAE Team Emirates XRG)
- April 6–11 (Spain) 2026 Tour of the Basque Country (UWT #15):
  - General Classification: (France) Paul Seixas(Decathlon CMA CGM)
  - Points Classification: (France) Paul Seixas(Decathlon CMA CGM)
  - Mountain Classification: (France) Paul Seixas(Decathlon CMA CGM)
  - Young Rider Classification: (Spain) Ion Izagirre(Cofidis)
  - Team Classification: Movistar Team
- April 12 (France) 2026 Paris–Roubaix (UWT #16):
  - (Belgium) Wout van Aert(Visma–Lease a Bike)
- April 19 (Netherlands) 2026 Amstel Gold Race (UWT #17):
  - (Belgium) Remco Evenepoel(Red Bull–Bora–Hansgrohe)
- April 22 (Belgium) 2026 La Flèche Wallonne (UWT #18):
  - (France) Paul Seixas(Decathlon CMA CGM)
- April 26 (Belgium) 2026 Liège–Bastogne–Liège (UWT #19):
  - (Slovenia) Tadej Pogačar(UAE Team Emirates XRG)
- April 28-May 3 (Switzerland) 2026 Tour de Romandie (UWT #20):
  - General Classification: (Slovenia) Tadej Pogačar(UAE Team Emirates XRG)
  - Points Classification: (Slovenia) Tadej Pogačar(UAE Team Emirates XRG)
  - Mountain Classification: (Switzerland) Roland Thalmann(Tudor Pro Cycling Team)
  - Young Rider Classification: (France) Lenny Martinez(Team Bahrain Victorious)
  - Team Classification: Red Bull–Bora–Hansgrohe Rookies
- May 1 (Germany) 2026 Eschborn–Frankfurt (UWT #21):
  - (Germany) Georg Zimmermann(Lotto–Intermarché)
- May 8–31 (Italy) 2026 Giro d'Italia (UWT #22):
  - General Classification: (Denmark) Jonas Vingegaard(Visma–Lease a Bike)
  - Points Classification: (France) Paul Magnier(Visma–Lease a Bike)
  - Mountain Classification: (Italy) Giulio Ciccone(Lidl–Trek)
  - Young Rider Classification: (Portugal) Afonso Eulálio(Team Bahrain Victorious)
  - Team Classification: Visma–Lease a Bike
- June 7–14 (France) 2026 Tour Auvergne-Rhône-Alpes (UWT #23):
  - General Classification: (Mexico) Isaac del Toro(UAE Team Emirates XRG)
  - Points Classification: (Israel) Nadav Raisberg(NSN Cycling Team)
  - Mountain Classification: (France) Clément Braz Afonso(Groupama–FDJ United)
  - Young Rider Classification: (Mexico) Isaac del Toro(UAE Team Emirates XRG)
  - Team Classification: Visma–Lease a Bike
- June 14 (Denmark) 2026 Copenhagen Sprint (UWT #24):
  - (Belgium) Jasper Philipsen(Alpecin–Premier Tech)
- June 17–21 (Switzerland) 2026 Tour de Suisse (UWT #25):
  - General Classification: (Slovenia) Tadej Pogačar(UAE Team Emirates XRG)
  - Points Classification: (Slovenia) Tadej Pogačar(UAE Team Emirates XRG)
  - Mountain Classification: (Belgium) Louis Vervaeke(Soudal–Quick-Step)
  - Young Rider Classification: (Czech Republic) Mathias Vacek(Lidl–Trek)
  - Team Classification: UAE Team Emirates XRG
- July 4–26 2026 Tour de France (UWT #26):
  - General Classification: (Slovenia) Tadej Pogačar(UAE Team Emirates XRG)
  - Points Classification: (Denmark) Mads Pedersen(Lidl–Trek)
  - Mountain Classification: (Ecuador) Richard Carapaz(EF Education–EasyPost)
  - Young Rider Classification: (Mexico) Isaac del Toro(UAE Team Emirates XRG)
  - Team Classification: Lidl–Trek
- August 1 (Spain) 2026 Clásica de San Sebastián (UWT #27):
  - (Belgium) Remco Evenepoel(Red Bull–Bora–Hansgrohe)
- August 3–9 (Poland) 2026 Tour de Pologne (UWT #28):
  - General Classification: (Germany) Marco Brenner(Tudor Pro Cycling Team)
  - Points Classification: (Germany) Marco Brenner(Tudor Pro Cycling Team)
  - Mountain Classification: (Italy) Walter Calzoni(Pinarello–Q36.5 Pro Cycling Team)
  - Team Classification: Visma–Lease a Bike
- August 16 (Germany) 2026 Hamburg Cyclassics (UWT #29):
  - (France) Paul Magnier(Soudal–Quick-Step)
- August 19–23 (Belgium) / (Netherlands) 2026 Renewi Tour (UWT #30):
  - General Classification: (Belgium) Jasper Philipsen(Alpecin–Premier Tech)
  - Points Classification: (Belgium) Jasper Philipsen(Alpecin–Premier Tech)
  - Young Rider Classification: (Italy) Pietro Mattio(Visma–Lease a Bike)
  - Team Classification: XDS Astana Team
- August 22-September 13 (Spain) 2026 Vuelta a España (UWT #31):
  - General Classification: (Spain) Enric Mas(Movistar Team)
  - Points Classification: (Belgium) Wout van Aert(Visma–Lease a Bike)
  - Mountain Classification: (Colombia) Santiago Buitrago(Team Bahrain Victorious)
  - Young Rider Classification: (United Kingdom) Oscar Onley(Netcompany INEOS)
  - Team Classification: Decathlon CMA CGM
- August 30 (France) 2026 Bretagne Classic (UWT #32):
  - (Spain) Alex Aranburu(Cofidis)
- September 11 (Canada) 2026 Grand Prix Cycliste de Québec (UWT #33):
  - (Belgium) Remco Evenepoel(Red Bull–Bora–Hansgrohe)
- September 13 (Canada) 2026 Grand Prix Cycliste de Montréal (UWT #34)
  - (Mexico) Isaac del Toro(UAE Team Emirates XRG)
- October 10 (Italy) Il Lombardia (UWT #35):
- October 13–18 (China) 2026 Tour of Guangxi (UWT #36):

==== 2026 UCI Women's World Tour ====
- January 17–19 (Australia) 2026 Women's Tour Down Under (WWT #1):
  - General Classification: (Switzerland) Noemi Rüegg(EF Education–Oatly)
  - Sprint Classification: (New Zealand) Ally Wollaston(FDJ United–Suez)
  - Mountain Classification: (Spain) Paula Blasi(UAE Team ADQ)
  - Young Rider Classification: (Germany) Justyna Czapla(Canyon//SRAM Zondacrypto)
  - Team Classification: UAE Team ADQ
- January 31 (Australia) 2026 Cadel Evans Great Ocean Road Race (WWT #2):
  - (New Zealand) Ally Wollaston(FDJ United–Suez)
- February 5–8 (United Arab Emirates) 2026 UAE Tour Women (WWT #3):
  - General Classification: (Italy) Elisa Longo Borghini(UAE Team ADQ)
  - Points Classification: (Netherlands) Lorena Wiebes(Team SD Worx–Protime)
  - Sprint Classification: (Italy) Sara Luccon(Top Girls Fassa Bortolo)
  - Young Rider Classification: (Italy) Eleonora Ciabocco(Team Picnic–PostNL)
  - Team Classification: Canyon//SRAM Zondacrypto
- February 28 (Belgium) 2026 Omloop Het Nieuwsblad (WWT #4):
  - (Netherlands) Demi Vollering(FDJ United–Suez)
- March 7 (Italy) 2026 Strade Bianche Donne (WWT #5):
  - (Switzerland) Elise Chabbey(FDJ United–Suez)
- March 15 (Italy) 2026 Trofeo Alfredo Binda-Comune di Cittiglio (WWT #6):
  - (Netherlands) Karlijn Swinkels(UAE Team ADQ)
- March 21 (Italy) 2026 Milan–San Remo Women (WWT #7):
  - (Belgium) Lotte Kopecky(Team SD Worx–Protime)
- March 26 (Belgium) 2026 Tour of Bruges Women (WWT #8):
  - (United Kingdom) Carys Lloyd(Movistar Team)
- March 29 (Belgium) 2026 Gent–Wevelgem (WWT #9):
  - (Netherlands) Lorena Wiebes(Team SD Worx–Protime)
- April 1 (Belgium) 2026 Dwars door Vlaanderen for Women (WWT #10):
  - (Switzerland) Marlen Reusser(Movistar Team)
- April 5 (Belgium) 2026 Tour of Flanders (WWT #11):
  - (Netherlands) Demi Vollering(FDJ United–Suez)
- April 12 (France) 2026 Paris–Roubaix Femmes (WWT #12):
  - (Germany) Franziska Koch(FDJ United–Suez)
- April 19 (Netherlands) 2026 Amstel Gold Race (WWT #13):
  - (Spain) Paula Blasi(UAE Team ADQ)
- April 22 (Belgium) 2026 La Flèche Wallonne Femmes (WWT #14):
  - (Netherlands) Demi Vollering(FDJ United–Suez)
- April 26 (Belgium) 2026 Liège–Bastogne–Liège Femmes (WWT #15):
  - (Netherlands) Demi Vollering(FDJ United–Suez)
- May 3–9 (Spain) 2026 La Vuelta Femenina (WWT #16):
  - General Classification: (Spain) Paula Blasi(UAE Team ADQ)
  - Points Classification: (Belgium) Lotte Kopecky(Team SD Worx–Protime)
  - Mountain Classification: (Spain) Paula Blasi(UAE Team ADQ)
  - Young Rider Classification: (France) Marion Bunel(Visma–Lease a Bike)
  - Team Classification: Team SD Worx–Protime
- May 15–17 (Spain) 2026 Itzulia Women (WWT #17):
  - General Classification: (Netherlands) Mischa Bredewold(Team SD Worx–Protime)
  - Points Classification: (Netherlands) Mischa Bredewold(Team SD Worx–Protime)
  - Mountain Classification: (Netherlands) Yara Kastelijn(Fenix–Premier Tech)
  - Young Rider Classification: (France) Ema Comte(Cofidis)
  - Team Classification: FDJ United–Suez
- May 21–24 (Spain) 2026 Vuelta a Burgos Feminas (WWT #18):
  - General Classification: (Netherlands) Yara Kastelijn(Fenix–Premier Tech)
  - Points Classification: (Netherlands) Lorena Wiebes(Team SD Worx–Protime)
  - Mountain Classification: (Netherlands) Yara Kastelijn(Fenix–Premier Tech)
  - Young Rider Classification: (Netherlands) Shirin van Anrooij(Lidl–Trek)
  - Team Classification): Liv AlUla Jayco
- May 30-June 7 (Italy) 2026 Giro d'Italia Women (WWT #19):
  - General Classification: (Netherlands) Demi Vollering(FDJ United–Suez)
  - Points Classification: (Italy) Elisa Balsamo(Lidl–Trek)
  - Mountain Classification: (Netherlands) Demi Vollering(FDJ United–Suez)
  - Young Rider Classification: (Canada) Isabella Holmgren(Lidl–Trek)
  - Team Classification: Lidl–Trek
- June 13 (Denmark) 2026 Copenhagen Sprint (WWT #20):
  - (Netherlands) Lorena Wiebes(Team SD Worx–Protime)
- June 17–21 (Switzerland) 2026 Tour de Suisse Women (WWT #21):
  - General Classification: (Switzerland) Marlen Reusser(Movistar Team)
  - Points Classification: (Switzerland) Marlen Reusser(Movistar Team)
  - Mountain Classification: (Netherlands) Femke de Vries(Visma–Lease a Bike)
  - Young Rider Classification: (France) Cédrine Kerbaol(EF Education–Oatly)
  - Team Classification: AG Insurance–Soudal
- August 1–9 2026 Tour de France Femmes (WWT #22):
  - General Classification: (Netherlands) Demi Vollering(FDJ United–Suez)
  - Points Classification: (Netherlands) Lorena Wiebes(Team SD Worx–Protime)
  - Mountain Classification: (Netherlands) Puck Pieterse(Fenix–Premier Tech)
  - Young Rider Classification: (Germany) Antonia Niedermaier(Canyon//SRAM)
  - Team Classification: UAE Team L'Imad
- August 19–23 (United Kingdom) 2026 Tour of Britain Women (WWT #23):
  - General Classification: (Mauritius) Kim Le Court-Pienaar(AG Insurance–Soudal)
  - Points Classification: (Netherlands) Lorena Wiebes(Team SD Worx–Protime)
  - Mountain Classification: (United Kingdom) Lauren Dickson(FDJ United–Suez)
  - Young Rider Classification: (Belgium) Fleur Moors(Lidl–Trek)
  - Team Classification: Lidl–Trek
- August 29 (France) 2026 Classic Lorient Agglomération (WWT #24):
  - (Italy) Elisa Balsamo(Lidl–Trek)
- ~~September 4–6 (Switzerland) 2026 Tour de Romandie Féminin (WWT #25):~~
  - ~~Race cancelled~~
- October 13–15 (China) 2026 Tour of Chongming Island (WWT #26):
- ~~October 18 (China) 2026 Tour of Guangxi (WWT #27):~~
  - ~~Race cancelled~~

== Disc golf ==
- 8–12 September WFDF 2026 World Team Disc Golf Championships in Lithuania

== Equestrianism ==
=== Horse Racing ===
- May 2: Kentucky Derby in Churchill Downs
- May 16: Preakness Stakes in (Maryland) Laurel Park
- June 6: Belmont Stakes in (New York (state)) Belmont Park
- Nov 6–7: Breeders Cup in (California) Santa Ana Park

== Golf ==
=== Men's major golf championships (PGA Tour) ===
- April 9–12: 2026 Masters Tournament at Augusta National Golf Club in Augusta, Georgia – (Northern Ireland) Rory McIlroy
- May 14–17: 2026 PGA Championship at Aronimink Golf Club in Newtown Square, Pennsylvania – (England) Aaron Rai
- June 18–21: 2026 U.S. Open at Shinnecock Hills Golf Club in Southampton, New York – (United States) Wyndham Clark
- July 16–19: 2026 Open Championship at Royal Birkdale Golf Club in Southport, England – (New Zealand) Ryan Fox

=== Women's major golf championships (LPGA Tour) ===
- April 23–26: 2026 Chevron Championship at Memorial Park Golf Course in Houston, Texas – (United States) Nelly Korda
- June 4–7: 2026 U.S. Women's Open at Riviera Country Club in Pacific Palisades, California – (United States) Nelly Korda
- June 25–28: 2026 Women's PGA Championship in Hazeltine National Golf Club in Chaska, Minnesota – (South Korea) Ryu Hae-ran
- July 9–12: 2026 Evian Championship in Evian Resort Golf Club in Évian-les-Bains, France – (South Korea) Ryu Hae-ran
- July 30 – August 2: 2026 Women's British Open at Royal Lytham & St Annes Golf Club in Lytham St. Annes, England– (Japan) Shiho Kuwaki

=== Senior major golf championships (PGA Tour Champions) ===
- April 16–19: Senior PGA Championship at The Concession Golf Club in Bradenton, Florida – (United States) Stewart Cink
- April 30 – May 3: Regions Tradition at Greystone Golf & Country Club in Birmingham, Alabama – (United States) Stewart Cink
- July 2–5: U.S. Senior Open at Scioto Country Club in Columbus, Ohio – (Republic of Ireland) Pádraig Harrington
- July 9–12: Kaulig Companies Championship at Firestone Country Club in Akron, Ohio – (United States) Zach Johnson
- July 23–26: ISPS Handa Senior Open at Gleneagles Hotel (King's Course) at Auchterarder, Scotland – (United States) Jerry Kelly

== Handball ==
- 15 January – 1 February 2026 European Men's Handball Championship in Denmark, Norway and Sweden
- 2026 European Women's Handball Championship in Czech Republic, Poland, Romania, Slovakia and Turkey
- 2026 Handball World Club Challenge in Croatia

== Hockey ==
=== Floorball ===
- January 24: Champions Cup finals
  - Men's champion: (Sweden) Storvreta IBK
  - Women's champion: (Sweden) Thorengruppen IBK
- May 6–10: 2026 Women's U-19 World Floorball Championships in Italy
- December 4–13: 2026 Men's World Floorball Championships in Finland

=== Ice hockey ===
==== National Hockey League ====
- October 7, 2025 – June 2026: 2025–26 NHL season
- March 2026: 2026 National Hockey League All-Star Game
- April 19: 2026 Stanley Cup playoffs
- June 26–27: 2026 NHL entry draft

== Netball ==
International tournaments

Date	Tournament	Winners	Runners up
25 July–2 August	2026 Commonwealth Games	New Zealand	Jamaica
2–6 August	2026 Central American and Caribbean Games	Trinidad and Tobago	Jamaica
8–15 August	2026 Asian Netball Championships	Singapore	Hong Kong

Major national leagues

Host	League	Winners	Runners up
Australia	Suncorp Super Netball	Adelaide Thunderbirds	Melbourne Vixens
New Zealand	ANZ Premiership	Northern Mystics	Southern Steel
United Kingdom	Netball Super League	Manchester Thunder	London Pulse

== Parasports ==
=== Wheelchair Basketball ===
Ottawa 2026 IWBF Wheelchair Basketball World Championships

== Rugby ==
=== Rugby League World Cups ===
- 15 October 2026 – 15 November 2026: 2026 Men's Rugby League World Cup in Australia,, New Zealand and Papua New Guinea
- 16 October 2026 – 15 November 2026: 2026 Women's Rugby League World Cup in Australia, New Zealand and Papua New Guinea
- 30 October 2026 – 13 November 2026: 2026 Wheelchair Rugby League World Cup in Australia

=== Rugby sevens ===
- 15–16 May: 2026 CASA Sevens in Tashkent, Uzbekistan
  - Men's tournament : Sri Lanka
  - Women's tournament : Sri Lanka

== Sepak takraw ==
=== ISTAF World Cup ===
- 16–23 May 2026 – 2026 ISTAF World Cup

== Swimming ==
In February, Croatian long-distance swimmer Dina Levačić became the first person to swim around the Saint Helena island.

== Tennis ==
=== Grand Slam ===
- January 18 – February 1: 2026 Australian Open
- May 24 – June 7: 2026 French Open
- June 29 – July 12: 2026 Wimbledon Championships
- August 31 – September 13: 2026 US Open
