= 2023 U-18 Men's Softball World Cup =

International softball tournament

Tournament details
- Host country: Mexico
- Dates: 11 – 19 November 2023
- Teams: 11
- Venues: 2 (in 1 host city)
- Defending champions: Japan

Final positions
- Champions: Japan (4th title)
- Runner-up: Mexico
- Third place: Canada
- Fourth place: United States

The 2023 U-18 Men's Softball World Cup was the 14th edition of the U-18 Men's Softball World Cup held in Hermosillo, Mexico, from November 11 to 19, and feature 11 national teams from four continents.

== Venues ==
The tournament held at Estadio Mundialistas Hermosillenses and Estadio Fernando M. Ortiz.

== Qualification ==
Event	Dates	Location(s)	Berth(s)	Qualified
Host nation	—N/a	—N/a	1	Mexico
Oceanian selection	—N/a	—N/a	2	Australia; New Zealand
U-18 World Cup African Qualifier	20–22 January 2023	(Uganda) Kampala	~~1~~	~~South Africa~~
U-18 Asia Cup	22–24 June 2023	(Japan) Kochi	2	Japan; Singapore
U-18 European Championship	3–8 July 2023	(Czech Republic) Břeclav, Kunovice	~~2~~ 1	Czech Republic; ~~Israel~~
U-18 Pan American Championship	3–9 September 2023	(Colombia) Sincelejo	4	United States; Venezuela; Canada; Argentina
Wildcard	—N/a	—N/a	1	Colombia
Total			11	

== First round ==
=== Group A ===
Pos	Team	Pld	W	L	RF	RA	PCT	GB	Qualification
1	Mexico (H)	5	5	0	41	8	1.000	—	Advance to super round
2	Canada	5	4	1	40	16	.800	1	Advance to super round
3	Australia	5	3	2	24	14	.600	2	Advance to super round
4	Czech Republic	5	2	3	28	16	.400	3	Advance to placement round
5	Colombia	5	1	4	11	38	.200	4	Advance to placement round
6	Singapore	5	0	5	12	64	.000	5	Advance to placement round

Source: WBSC
(H) Hosts

Date	Local time	Road team	Score	Home team	Inn.	Venue	Game duration	Attendance	Boxscore
Nov 11, 2023	12:00	Canada	5–2	Czech Republic		Estadio Mundialistas Hermosillenses	2:04	100	Boxscore
Nov 11, 2023	16:30	Australia	14–0	Singapore	F/4	Estadio Fernando M. Ortiz	1:36	200	Boxscore
Nov 11, 2023	20:30	Colombia	0–10	Mexico	F/4	Estadio Fernando M. Ortiz	1:15	996	Boxscore
Nov 12, 2023	12:00	Canada	18–1	Singapore	F/3	Estadio Mundialistas Hermosillenses	1:24	60	Boxscore
Nov 12, 2023	15:00	Colombia	2–3	Australia		Estadio Mundialistas Hermosillenses	1:45	80	Boxscore
Nov 12, 2023	20:00	Mexico	4–1	Czech Republic		Estadio Fernando M. Ortiz	2:05	820	Boxscore
Nov 13, 2023	12:00	Singapore	5–8	Colombia		Estadio Mundialistas Hermosillenses	2:13	50	Boxscore
Nov 13, 2023	14:00	Australia	3–2	Czech Republic	F/8	Estadio Fernando M. Ortiz	2:13	100	Boxscore
Nov 13, 2023	20:00	Mexico	10–3	Canada		Estadio Fernando M. Ortiz	2:05	1,028	Boxscore
Nov 14, 2023	15:00	Czech Republic	13–3	Singapore	F/5	Estadio Mundialistas Hermosillenses	1:44	40	Boxscore
Nov 14, 2023	17:00	Colombia	0–10	Canada	F/4	Estadio Fernando M. Ortiz	1:07	140	Boxscore
Nov 14, 2023	20:00	Mexico	6–1	Australia		Estadio Fernando M. Ortiz	2:00	1,156	Boxscore
Nov 15, 2023	12:00	Czech Republic	10–1	Colombia	F/5	Estadio Mundialistas Hermosillenses	1:38	50	Boxscore
Nov 15, 2023	14:00	Canada	4–3	Australia		Estadio Fernando M. Ortiz	1:45	250	Boxscore
Nov 15, 2023	20:00	Singapore	3–11	Mexico	F/5	Estadio Fernando M. Ortiz	1:42	650	Boxscore

=== Group B ===
Pos	Team	Pld	W	L	RF	RA	PCT	GB	Qualification
1	United States	4	3	1	27	16	.750 (Note: Head-to-head result: Australia 4–3 Venezuela)	—	Advance to super round
2	Japan	4	3	1	33	18	.750	—	Advance to super round
3	Venezuela	4	2	2	13	21	.500	1	Advance to super round
4	Argentina	4	1	3	21	18	.250 (Note: Head-to-head result: Argentina 4–3 New Zealand)	2	Advance to placement round
5	New Zealand	4	1	3	17	38	.250	2	Advance to placement round

Source: WBSC
Notes:

Date	Local time	Road team	Score	Home team	Inn.	Venue	Game duration	Attendance	Boxscore
Nov 11, 2023	13:30	New Zealand	5–10	Japan		Estadio Fernando M. Ortiz	2:06	200	Boxscore
Nov 11, 2023	15:00	Venezuela	5–8	United States		Estadio Mundialistas Hermosillenses	2:24	80	Boxscore
Nov 12, 2023	14:00	New Zealand	1–2	Venezuela		Estadio Fernando M. Ortiz	1:34	150	Boxscore
Nov 12, 2023	17:00	Japan	12–1	Argentina	F/4	Estadio Fernando M. Ortiz	1:24	250	Boxscore
Nov 13, 2023	15:00	Argentina	18–1	New Zealand	F/4	Estadio Mundialistas Hermosillenses	1:37	150	Boxscore
Nov 13, 2023	17:00	United States	9–1	Japan	F/5	Estadio Fernando M. Ortiz	1:35	203	Boxscore
Nov 14, 2023	12:00	Venezuela	3–10	Japan	F/6	Estadio Mundialistas Hermosillenses	1:55	56	Boxscore
Nov 14, 2023	14:00	Argentina	0–2	United States		Estadio Fernando M. Ortiz	1:39	117	Boxscore
Nov 15, 2023	15:00	Venezuela	3–2	Argentina		Estadio Mundialistas Hermosillenses	1:51	100	Boxscore
Nov 15, 2023	17:00	New Zealand	10–8	United States		Estadio Fernando M. Ortiz	2:03	150	Boxscore

== Super round ==
Pos	Team	Pld	W	L	RF	RA	PCT	GB	Qualification
1	Japan	5	4	1	28	17	.800	—	Advance to final
2	Mexico (H)	5	3	2	29	16	.600 (Note: TQB)	1	Advance to final
3	Canada	5	3	2	24	27	.600	1	Advance to third-place game
4	United States	5	3	2	27	27	.600	1	Advance to third-place game
5	Australia	5	1	4	11	23	.200 (Note: Head-to-head result: Australia 4–3 Venezuela)	3	
6	Venezuela	5	1	4	20	29	.200	3	

Source: WBSC
(H) Hosts
Notes:

Date	Local time	Road team	Score	Home team	Inn.	Venue	Game duration	Attendance	Boxscore
Nov 16, 2023	14:00	Venezuela	3–4	Australia		Estadio Fernando M. Ortiz	1:41	127	Boxscore
Nov 16, 2023	17:00	Canada	1–4	Japan		Estadio Fernando M. Ortiz	2:05	605	Boxscore
Nov 16, 2023	20:00	Mexico	8–1	United States	F/5	Estadio Fernando M. Ortiz	1:23	1,522	Boxscore
Nov 17, 2023	14:00	Australia	0–6	Japan		Estadio Fernando M. Ortiz	1:32	50	Boxscore
Nov 17, 2023	17:00	Canada	10–5	United States		Estadio Fernando M. Ortiz	2:32	832	Boxscore
Nov 17, 2023	20:00	Venezuela	4–1	Mexico		Estadio Fernando M. Ortiz	2:03	915	Boxscore
Nov 18, 2023	14:00	Australia	3–4	United States		Estadio Fernando M. Ortiz	1:51	120	Boxscore
Nov 18, 2023	17:00	Venezuela	5–6	Canada	F/8	Estadio Fernando M. Ortiz	2:20	958	Boxscore
Nov 18, 2023	20:00	Japan	7–4	Mexico		Estadio Fernando M. Ortiz	2:17	1,025	Boxscore

== Placement round ==
Pos	Team	Pld	W	L	RF	RA	PCT	GB
1	Czech Republic	4	4	0	42	10	1.000	—
2	Argentina	4	3	1	37	14	.750	1
3	New Zealand	4	2	2	40	38	.500	2
4	Colombia	4	1	3	15	39	.250	3
5	Singapore	4	0	4	16	49	.000	4

Source: WBSC

Date	Local time	Road team	Score	Home team	Inn.	Venue	Game duration	Attendance	Boxscore
Nov 16, 2023	12:00	New Zealand	17–5	Colombia	F/5	Estadio Mundialistas Hermosillenses	2:08	80	Boxscore
Nov 16, 2023	15:00	Czech Republic	9–2	Argentina	F/6	Estadio Mundialistas Hermosillenses	1:57	50	Boxscore
Nov 17, 2023	12:00	Singapore	3–10	Argentina	F/5	Estadio Mundialistas Hermosillenses	1:38	65	Boxscore
Nov 17, 2023	15:00	New Zealand	4–10	Czech Republic		Estadio Mundialistas Hermosillenses	2:12	105	Boxscore
Nov 18, 2023	12:00	Singapore	5–18	New Zealand	F/4	Estadio Mundialistas Hermosillenses	1:42	100	Boxscore
Nov 18, 2023	15:00	Colombia	1–7	Argentina		Estadio Mundialistas Hermosillenses	2:02	54	Boxscore

== Finals ==
=== Third place game ===
Date	Local time	Road team	Score	Home team	Inn.	Venue	Game duration	Attendance	Boxscore
Nov 19, 2023	14:00	United States	1–2	Canada		Estadio Fernando M. Ortiz	1:41	1,383	Boxscore

=== Championship ===
Date	Local time	Road team	Score	Home team	Inn.	Venue	Game duration	Attendance	Boxscore
Nov 19, 2023	17:00	Mexico	4–8	Japan	F/8	Estadio Fernando M. Ortiz	2:12	2,371	Boxscore

== Final standings ==
Rk	Team	W	L
1st place, gold medalist(s)	Japan	7	1
Lost in Final
2nd place, silver medalist(s)	Mexico	6	3
Won in 3rd-place game
3rd place, bronze medalist(s)	Canada	7	2
Lost in 3rd-place game
4	United States	4	4
Failed to qualify for the finals
5	Australia	4	4
6	Venezuela	3	4
Failed to qualify for the super round
7	Czech Republic	4	3
8	Argentina	3	4
9	New Zealand	3	4
10	Colombia	1	6
11	Singapore	0	7

2023 U-18 Men's Softball World Cup

Japan
4th title

== External websites ==
- Official website
