= New Zealand men's junior national softball team =

New Zealand under-18 softball team

Information
- Country: New Zealand
- Federation: Softball New Zealand
- Confederation: WBSC Oceania
- Manager: Jarrad Martin

New Zealand men's junior national softball team is the junior national under-18 team for New Zealand. The team competed at the 1985 ISF Junior Men's World Championship in Fargo, North Dakota where they finished first. The team competed at the 1989 ISF Junior Men's World Championship in Summerside, Prince Edward Island where they finished first. The team competed at the 1993 ISF Junior Men's World Championship in Auckland, New Zealand where they finished second. The team competed at the 1997 ISF Junior Men's World Championship in St. John's, Newfoundland where they finished second. The team competed at the 2001 ISF Junior Men's World Championship in Sydney, Australia where they finished fourth. The team competed at the 2005 ISF Junior Men's World Championship in Summerside, Prince Edward Island where they finished fourth. The team competed at the 2008 ISF Junior Men's World Championship in Whitehorse, Yukon where they finished fourth. The team competed at the 2012 ISF Junior Men's World Championship in Parana, Argentina where they finished sixth.

== Results and fixtures ==
The following is a list of match results in the last 12 months, as well as any future matches that have been scheduled.

Win Draw Loss Fixture

=== 2023 ===
2023 U-18 Men's Softball World Cup	11 November 2023	New Zealand	5–10	Japan	Estadio Fernando M. Ortiz, Hermosillo
2023 U-18 Men's Softball World Cup	13:30	LP: Hunter Simpson	Boxscore	WP: Kanta Aso; Sv: Rio Takahashi	Attendance: 200

2023 U-18 Men's Softball World Cup	12 November 2023	New Zealand	1–2	Venezuela	Estadio Fernando M. Ortiz, Hermosillo
2023 U-18 Men's Softball World Cup	14:00	LP: Jacob Neale	Boxscore	WP: Carlos Pinto German; HR: Yeferson Colmenarez Querales	Attendance: 150

2023 U-18 Men's Softball World Cup	13 November 2023	Argentina	18–1 (F/4)	New Zealand	Estadio Mundialistas Hermosillenses, Hermosillo
2023 U-18 Men's Softball World Cup	15:00	WP: Lucas Galarza	Boxscore	LP: Lennox Easthope	Attendance: 150

2023 U-18 Men's Softball World Cup	15 November 2023	New Zealand	10–8	United States	Estadio Fernando M. Ortiz, Hermosillo
2023 U-18 Men's Softball World Cup	17:00	WP: Hunter Simpson; HR: Maximus Russell, Joshua Kennedy	Boxscore	LP: Karson Martin; HR: Brody von Berge	Attendance: 150

2023 U-18 Men's Softball World Cup	16 November 2023	New Zealand	17–5 (F/5)	Colombia	Estadio Mundialistas Hermosillenses, Hermosillo
2023 U-18 Men's Softball World Cup	12:00	WP: Jaden Hita; HR: George McCarroll	Boxscore	LP: Sergio Aragon; HR: Juan Luna Ortiz	Attendance: 80

2023 U-18 Men's Softball World Cup	17 November 2023	New Zealand	4–10	Czech Republic	Estadio Mundialistas Hermosillenses, Hermosillo
2023 U-18 Men's Softball World Cup	15:00	LP: Hunter Simpson	Boxscore	WP: Matěj Macas; Sv: Matyáš Zelinka	Attendance: 105

2023 U-18 Men's Softball World Cup	18 November 2023	Singapore	5–18 (F/4)	New Zealand	Estadio Mundialistas Hermosillenses, Hermosillo
2023 U-18 Men's Softball World Cup	12:00	LP: Taiki Kang; HR: Ean Eu	Boxscore	WP: Jaden Hita; HR: Maximus Russell, Joseph Simpson-Smith, Lennox Easthope	Attendance: 100

== Players ==
=== Current squad ===
The following 19 players were called up for the 2023 U-18 Men's Softball World Cup.

- Cohen Bailey
- Ciaran Bolger
- Brandon Bristowe
- Fletcher Due
- Lennox Easthope
- Arron Gollan
- Katene Huriwai
- Josh Kennedy
- Hapene Kumeroa
- George McCarroll
- Jacob Neale
- Jayden Potts
- Shiloh Rice
- Max Russell
- Norpera Tangaroa
- Zahr Shaw-Wallace
- Hunter Simpson
- Joe Simpson-Smith
- Connor Stanley

== Competitive Record ==
=== Junior Men's Softball World Championship/U-18 Men's Softball World Cup ===
Junior Men's Softball World Championship/U-18 Men's Softball World Cup record
Year	Host	Round	Pos	Pld	W	L	RF	RA	Squad
1981	Canada	Did not participate							
1985	United States	Winners	1st						
1989	Canada	Winners	1st						
1993	New Zealand	Runners-up	2nd						
1997	Canada	Runners-up	2nd						
2001	Australia	Fourth place	4th						
2005	Canada	Fourth place	4th						
2008	Canada	Fourth place	4th						
2012	Argentina	Sixth place	6th						
2014	Canada	Runners-up	2nd						
2016	United States	Runners-up	2nd						
2018	Canada	Third place	3rd	9	6	3	64	23	
2020	New Zealand	Second round	5th	8	4	4	52	44	
2023	Mexico	Group stage	9th	7	3	4	56	58	
Total		2 titles	13/14	24	13	11	172	125	—
