= U-18 Pan American Men's Softball Championship =

- Sport: Softball
- Founded: 2019
- Continent: Americas
- Most recent champion: Argentina (1st title)
- Most titles: Canada; United States; Argentina (1 title each)

The U-18 Pan American Men's Softball Championship was the main championship tournament between under-18 men's softball teams across the Americas, governed by WBSC Americas. The first tournament was held in Guatemala in 2019 as a competition for boys' softball teams under-17. Later, it was changed to an under-18 age group, and the inaugural event was held in Sincelejo in Colombia. The tournament also serves as a qualification to the WBSC's U-18 Men's Softball World Cup for the Americas.

== Results ==
| Year | Host | Final | | | Semifinalists | | |
| Year | Host | Champions | Score | Runners-up | 3rd place | Score | 4th place |
| 2019 | (Guatemala) | Canada | | Mexico | Argentina | | Guatemala |
| 2023 | (Colombia); Sincelejo | United States | 6–1 | Venezuela | Canada | 1–0 | Argentina |
| 2025 | (Argentina); Bahía Blanca | Argentina | 6–0 | Mexico | Canada | 7–6 | Venezuela |

== Medal table ==
| Rank | Nation | Gold | Silver | Bronze | Total |
|---|---|---|---|---|---|
| 1 | Canada | 1 | 0 | 2 | 3 |
| 2 | Argentina | 1 | 0 | 1 | 2 |
| 3 | United States | 1 | 0 | 0 | 1 |
| 4 | Mexico | 0 | 2 | 0 | 2 |
| 5 | Venezuela | 0 | 1 | 0 | 1 |
| Totals (5 entries) | | 3 | 3 | 3 | 9 |
