= Carson Soucy =

Canadian ice hockey player (born 1994)

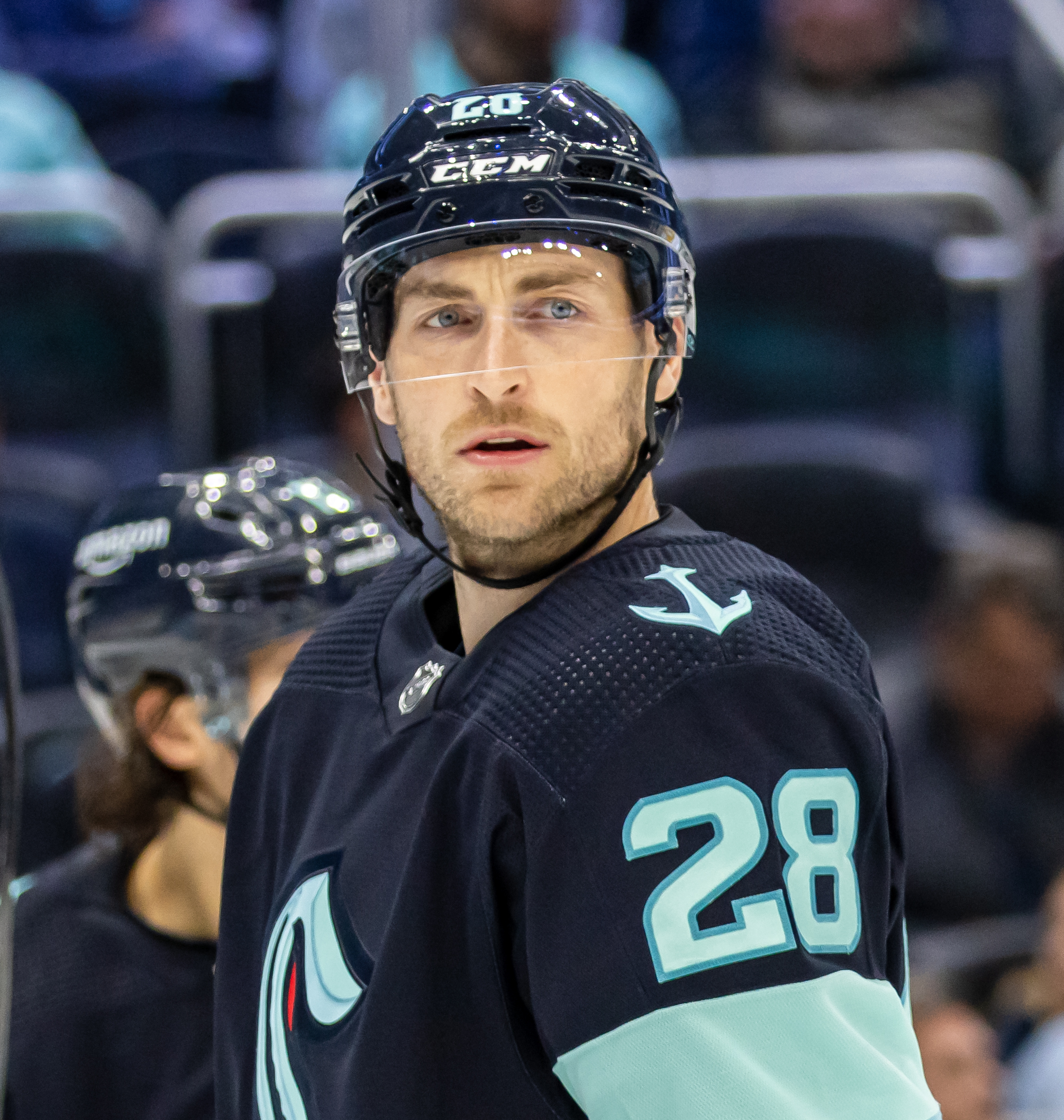
- Soucy with the Seattle Kraken in 2023
- Born: July 27, 1994 (age 32) Viking, Alberta, Canada
- Height: 6 ft 5 in (196 cm)
- Weight: 210 lb (95 kg; 15 st 0 lb)
- Position: Defence
- Shoots: Left
- NHL team (P) Cur. team Former teams: Columbus Blue Jackets; Cleveland Monsters (AHL); Minnesota Wild; Seattle Kraken; Vancouver Canucks; New York Rangers; New York Islanders
- NHL draft: 137th overall, 2013; Minnesota Wild
- Playing career: 2017–present

Carson Soucy (born July 27, 1994) is a Canadian professional ice hockey player who is a defenceman for the Cleveland Monsters in the American Hockey League (AHL) while under contract to the Columbus Blue Jackets of the National Hockey League (NHL). He was selected by the Minnesota Wild, 137th overall, in the 2013 NHL entry draft.

== Playing career ==
=== Junior ===
Growing up in Alberta, Soucy competed at the Triple-A midget level until he was 18 before being cut from the Edmonton Oil Kings of the Western Hockey League (WHL). Following this, he played one season of junior A hockey with the Spruce Grove Saints of the Alberta Junior Hockey League (AJHL) and assisted in their 2013 AJHL North Division regular season and playoff titles. During this time, he also competed in softball and was an outfielder during the 2012 Junior Men's Softball World Championship for Canada national junior team. Upon returning from the softball tournament, Soucy suffered a torn medial collateral ligament (MCL) and missed numerous games to recover.

After experiencing a six-inch (15 cm) growth spurt, which drew attention from American NCAA Division I schools, Soucy chose to play collegiate ice hockey with the Minnesota–Duluth Bulldogs of the National Collegiate Hockey Conference (NCHC). Leading up to the 2013 NHL entry draft, Soucy was ranked 137th overall among North American skaters by the NHL Central Scouting Bureau. He was eventually drafted 137th overall by the Minnesota Wild. His cousin Parker MacKay joined Soucy with the Bulldogs for two seasons.

=== Professional ===
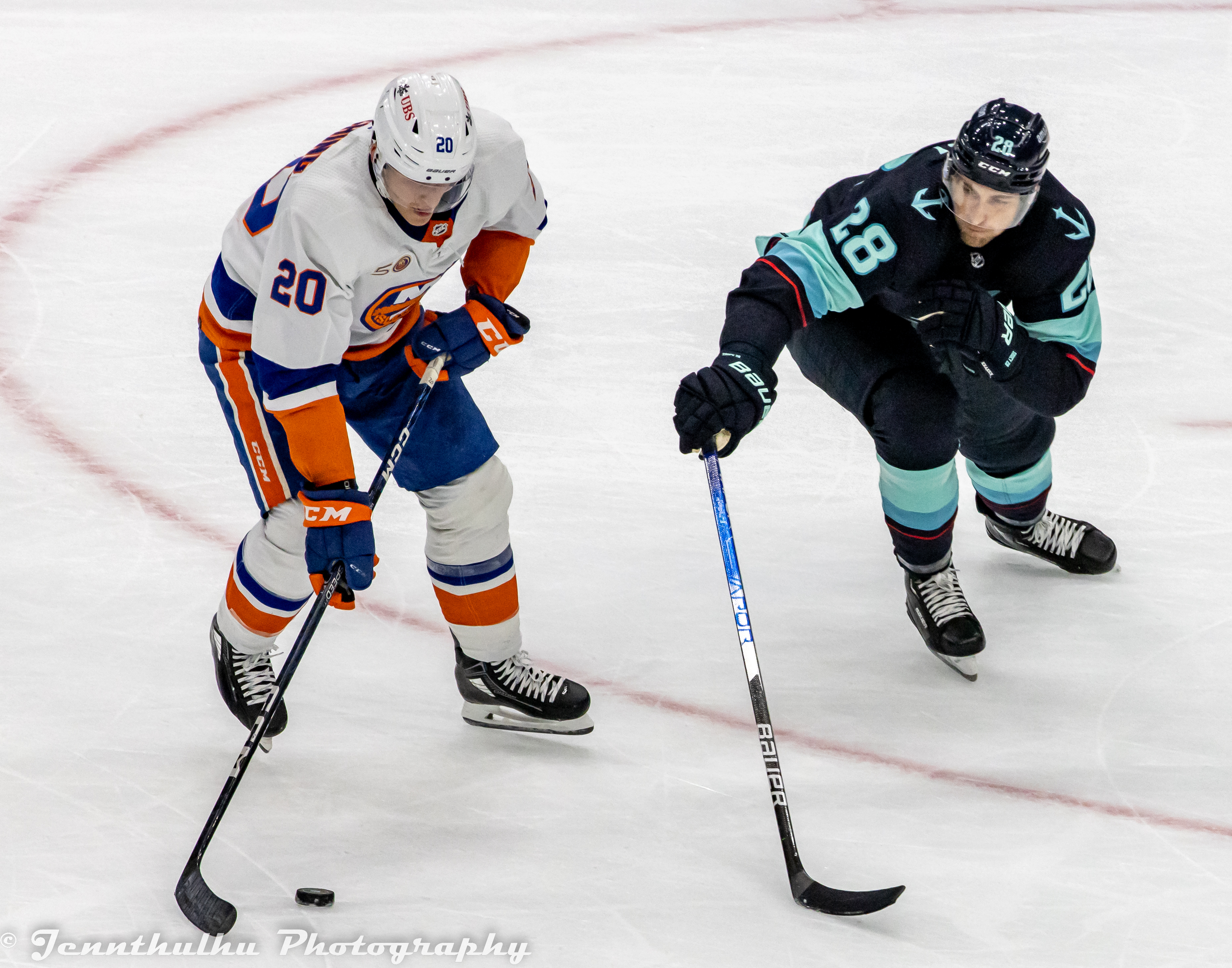
Soucy (right) and Hudson Fasching during a game in 2023

On April 11, 2017, at the conclusion of his four-year collegiate career, Soucy was signed to a two-year, entry-level contract with the Minnesota Wild. He was subsequently re-assigned to the Wild's American Hockey League (AHL) affiliate, the Iowa Wild, for the remainder of the 2016–17 season. Soucy was subsequently invited to the Minnesota Wild's development camp, where he was praised by Wild's director of player development Brad Bombardir for his play during the camp who said: "Carson Soucy just continues to improve and get better every development camp, and this was his fifth development camp. He continues to be one of the most improved, year in and year out, so I was happy with him." After attending the Wild's training camp, Soucy began the 2017–18 season with the Iowa Wild. After playing 67 games in the AHL, accumulating 15 points and a team-leading plus-12 rating, Soucy was recalled to the NHL on April 2, 2018, following an injury to Ryan Suter. He made his NHL debut against the Edmonton Oilers that night, registering three shots and two hits in 15:26 of time on ice. He became the fifth player to make his NHL debut with the Wild that season before being re-assigned to Iowa on April 6.

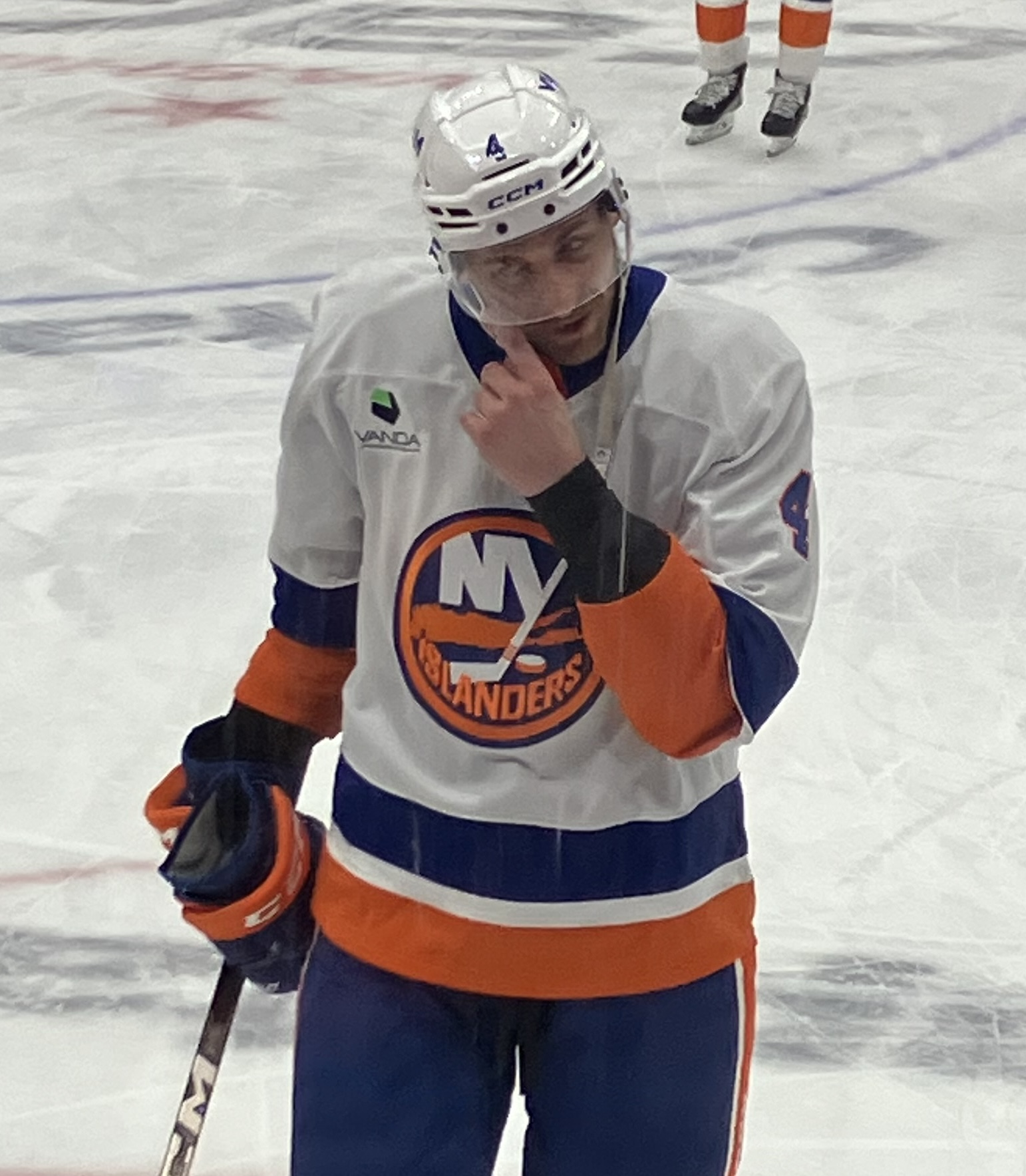
Soucy with the New York Islanders in 2026.

The following season Soucy failed to impress at the Wild's training camp and spent the entirety of the 2018–19 season in the AHL. When he returned to training camp for the 2019–20 season, he impressed Boudreau, who said: "This year, we didn't know what to expect. And he came in and he was aggressive, and he moved the puck well, and he defended well. So it was all good." During this season, Soucy suffered an upper-body injury and was expected to miss 2–4 weeks to recover. On October 5, 2020, Soucy signed a three-year, $8.25 million contract extension to remain with the Wild.

On July 21, 2021, Soucy was selected from the Wild at the 2021 NHL expansion draft by the Seattle Kraken.

After two seasons with the Seattle Kraken, Soucy left the club as a free agent and was signed to a three-year, $9.75 million contract with the Vancouver Canucks on July 1, 2023. On March 6, 2025, Soucy was traded to the New York Rangers in exchange for a conditional 2025 third-round pick.

During the 2025–26 season, on January 26, 2026, Soucy was traded by the Rangers to their rival, the New York Islanders, in exchange for a 2026 third-round pick. Soucy played out the remainder of the season with the Islanders, posting 2 goals and 4 goals through 30 appearances from the blueline.

As a free agent at the conclusion of his contract with the Islanders, Soucy went unsigned over the summer before joining the Columbus Blue Jackets on an initial try-out contract through pre-season before agreeing to a one-year, $1.15 million contract for the 2026–27 season on September 29, 2026.

== Personal life ==
Soucy was born in Viking, Alberta, on July 27, 1994, to mother Debbie. Soucy grew up in Irma, Alberta. His father Mike Soucy has played softball. Soucy's older brother Tyson also played ice hockey, last playing for the Elk Point Elks of the SaskAlta Senior Hockey League.

Soucy and his wife Shyla have twin daughters.

== Career statistics ==
| | | | Regular season | | | | | Playoffs |
| Season | Team | League | GP | G | A | Pts | PIM | GP | G | A | Pts | PIM |
|---|---|---|---|---|---|---|---|---|---|---|---|---|
| 2010–11 | Lloydminster Bobcats | AMHL | 34 | 3 | 8 | 11 | 20 | 2 | 0 | 0 | 0 | 2 |
| 2011–12 | Lloydminster Bobcats | AMHL | 30 | 9 | 20 | 29 | 100 | — | — | — | — | — |
| 2011–12 | Spruce Grove Saints | AJHL | 7 | 0 | 0 | 0 | 0 | — | — | — | — | — |
| 2012–13 | Spruce Grove Saints | AJHL | 35 | 5 | 10 | 15 | 71 | 16 | 1 | 1 | 2 | 30 |
| 2013–14 | University of Minnesota Duluth | NCHC | 34 | 0 | 6 | 6 | 60 | — | — | — | — | — |
| 2014–15 | University of Minnesota Duluth | NCHC | 40 | 6 | 8 | 14 | 40 | — | — | — | — | — |
| 2015–16 | University of Minnesota Duluth | NCHC | 38 | 3 | 9 | 12 | 61 | — | — | — | — | — |
| 2016–17 | University of Minnesota Duluth | NCHC | 35 | 3 | 12 | 15 | 55 | — | — | — | — | — |
| 2016–17 | Iowa Wild | AHL | 3 | 0 | 0 | 0 | 2 | — | — | — | — | — |
| 2017–18 | Iowa Wild | AHL | 67 | 1 | 14 | 15 | 55 | — | — | — | — | — |
| 2017–18 | Minnesota Wild | NHL | 3 | 0 | 0 | 0 | 2 | 4 | 0 | 0 | 0 | 0 |
| 2018–19 | Iowa Wild | AHL | 66 | 5 | 15 | 20 | 71 | 11 | 0 | 2 | 2 | 6 |
| 2019–20 | Minnesota Wild | NHL | 55 | 7 | 7 | 14 | 18 | 4 | 0 | 0 | 0 | 0 |
| 2020–21 | Minnesota Wild | NHL | 50 | 1 | 16 | 17 | 51 | 4 | 0 | 0 | 0 | 2 |
| 2021–22 | Seattle Kraken | NHL | 64 | 10 | 11 | 21 | 47 | — | — | — | — | — |
| 2022–23 | Seattle Kraken | NHL | 78 | 3 | 13 | 16 | 68 | 14 | 1 | 1 | 2 | 12 |
| 2023–24 | Vancouver Canucks | NHL | 40 | 2 | 4 | 6 | 12 | 12 | 1 | 4 | 5 | 6 |
| 2024–25 | Vancouver Canucks | NHL | 59 | 3 | 7 | 10 | 42 | — | — | — | — | — |
| 2024–25 | New York Rangers | NHL | 16 | 1 | 2 | 3 | 4 | — | — | — | — | — |
| 2025–26 | New York Rangers | NHL | 46 | 3 | 5 | 8 | 18 | — | — | — | — | — |
| 2025–26 | New York Islanders | NHL | 30 | 2 | 2 | 4 | 20 | — | — | — | — | — |
| NHL totals | | | 441 | 32 | 67 | 99 | 282 | 38 | 2 | 5 | 7 | 20 |
