= 2023 U-18 Pan American Men's Softball Championship =

Men's softball tournament

Tournament details
- Host country: Colombia
- Dates: 3–9 September 2023
- Teams: 6

Final positions
- Champions: United States (1st title)
- Runner-up: Venezuela
- Third place: Canada
- Fourth place: Argentina

Tournament statistics
- Most Valuable Player: (United States) Cody Gibbons

The 2023 U-18 Pan American Men's Softball Championship was an international softball tournament which featured six nations and was held from 3–9 September 2023 in Sincelejo, Colombia.

== Opening round ==
Team	Score	Team
Colombia	7–8	Peru
United States	6–0	Venezuela
Argentina	11–0	Peru
Canada	4–0	Colombia
Peru	0–15	United States
Venezuela	8–1	Canada
Argentina	6–0	Colombia
Peru	1–10	Canada
United States	2–1	Argentina
Colombia	4–7	Venezuela
Argentina	7–5	Canada
Peru	1–11	Venezuela
Colombia	0–10	United States
Venezuela	8–7	Argentina
Canada	7–6	United States

== Fifth place game ==
Team	1	2	3	4	5	6	7	8	R	H	E
Colombia	3	0	3	1	2	0	0	1	9	11	1
Peru	0	0	3	1	0	3	0	0	7	5	3
Boxscore

== Third place game ==
Team	1	2	3	4	5	6	7	8	R	H	E
Canada	0	0	0	0	0	0	0	1	1	2	0
Argentina	0	0	0	0	0	0	0	0	0	1	0
Boxscore

== Final ==
Team	1	2	3	4	5	6	7	R	H	E
Venezuela	1	0	0	0	0	0	0	1	3	0
United States	3	0	2	1	0	0	X	6	7	1
Boxscore

== Final standings ==
Rank	Team
1st place, gold medalist(s)	United States
2nd place, silver medalist(s)	Venezuela
3rd place, bronze medalist(s)	Canada
4th	Argentina
5th	Colombia
6th	Peru
