= 2026 U-18 Men's Softball European Championship =

Tournament details
- Host country: Czechia
- Dates: 30 June – 4 July 2026
- Teams: 5
- Defending champions: Czech Republic (2023)

Final positions
- Champions: Czech Republic (11th title)
- Runner-up: Lithuania
- Third place: Israel
- Fourth place: Denmark

Tournament statistics
- Games played: 22

The 2026 U-18 Men's Softball European Championship was the 13th edition of the U-18 Men's Softball European Championship, organised by Europe's governing softball body, the WBSC Europe. The tournament was held in Břeclav and Kunovice, Czech Republic from 30 June to 4 July 2026. It was held concurrently with the U-16 Men's Softball European Championship. The top two teams of the tournament will qualify for the 2027 U-18 Men's Softball World Cup.

Czech Republic defeated Lithuania 15–0 to win the championship. Czech Republic and Lithuania have qualified for the 2027 U-18 Men's Softball World Cup.

== Participating teams ==
- Czech Republic
- Denmark
- Great Britain
- Israel
- Lithuania

== Opening round ==
Pos	Team	Pld	W	L	RF	RA	PCT	GB	Qualification
1	Czech Republic (H)	8	8	0	120	3	1.000	—	Advance to final
2	Lithuania	8	4	4	81	99	.500	4	Advance to final
3	Israel	8	4	4	69	93	.500	4	Advance to 3rd place match
4	Denmark	8	2	6	69	92	.250	6	Advance to 3rd place match
5	Great Britain	8	2	6	48	100	.250	6	

Source: WBSC Europe
(H) Hosts

Date	Local time	Road team	Score	Home team	Inn.	Venue	Game duration	Attendance	Boxscore
June 30, 2026	9:00	Great Britain	8–9	Israel		Břeclav	2:11		Boxscore
June 30, 2026	11:15	Lithuania	0–15	Czech Republic	3	Břeclav	1:15	60	Boxscore
June 30, 2026	13:30	Israel	12–11	Denmark		Břeclav	2:50	70	Boxscore
June 30, 2026	15:45	Great Britain	4–14	Lithuania	4	Břeclav	1:27	78	Boxscore
June 30, 2026	18:00	Denmark	0–15	Czech Republic	3	Břeclav	1:06	85	Boxscore
July 1, 2026	9:00	Israel	12–19	Lithuania	5	Břeclav	2:13	79	Boxscore
July 1, 2026	11:15	Denmark	14–5	Great Britain	6	Břeclav	2:12	90	Boxscore
July 1, 2026	13:30	Czech Republic	17–0	Israel	3	Břeclav	1:09	93	Boxscore
July 1, 2026	15:45	Lithuania	9–20	Denmark	4	Břeclav	2:05	93	Boxscore
July 1, 2026	18:00	Czech Republic	19–0	Great Britain	3	Břeclav	1:19	85	Boxscore
July 2, 2026	10:00	Denmark	6–13	Israel	5	Kunovice Field –“Mlatevňa” - Field 1	1:52		Boxscore
July 2, 2026	12:15	Lithuania	18–11	Great Britain	5	Kunovice Field –“Mlatevňa” - Field 1	2:12	50	Boxscore
July 2, 2026	14:30	Czech Republic	14–3	Denmark	4	Kunovice Field –“Mlatevňa” - Field 1	1:29	100	Boxscore
July 2, 2026	16:45	Israel	10–11	Great Britain		Kunovice Field –“Mlatevňa” - Field 1	2:19	200	Boxscore
July 2, 2026	19:00	Czech Republic	11–0	Lithuania	5	Kunovice Field –“Mlatevňa” - Field 1	1:16	200	Boxscore
July 3, 2026	10:00	Denmark	13–15	Lithuania		Kunovice Field –“Mlatevňa” - Field 1	2:45	35	Boxscore
July 3, 2026	12:15	Lithuania	6–13	Israel	5	Kunovice Field –“Mlatevňa” - Field 1	1:56	100	Boxscore
July 3, 2026	14:30	Great Britain	9–2	Denmark	5	Kunovice Field –“Mlatevňa” - Field 1	1:48	110	Boxscore
July 3, 2026	16:45	Israel	0–15	Czech Republic	3	Kunovice Field –“Mlatevňa” - Field 1	1:01		Boxscore
July 3, 2026	19:00	Great Britain	0–14	Czech Republic	4	Kunovice Field –“Mlatevňa” - Field 1	1:03		Boxscore

== Finals ==
=== 3rd place match ===
Date	Local time	Road team	Score	Home team	Inn.	Venue	Game duration	Attendance	Boxscore
July 4, 2026	15:30	Denmark	7–14	Israel	5	Břeclav	2:05	120	Boxscore

=== Final ===
Date	Local time	Road team	Score	Home team	Inn.	Venue	Game duration	Attendance	Boxscore
July 4, 2026	18:00	Lithuania	0–15	Czech Republic	3	Břeclav	1:05	300	Boxscore

== Final standing ==
Rank	Team
1st place, gold medalist(s)	Czech Republic
2nd place, silver medalist(s)	Lithuania
3rd place, bronze medalist(s)	Israel
4	Denmark
5	Great Britain

Qualified for the 2027 U-18 World Cup

== External websites ==
- Official website
