= 2026 U-16 Men's Softball European Championship =

Tournament details
- Host country: Czechia
- Dates: 30 June – 4 July 2026
- Teams: 5
- Defending champions: Czech Republic (2023)

Final positions
- Champions: Czech Republic (4th title)
- Runner-up: Croatia
- Third place: Denmark
- Fourth place: Great Britain

Tournament statistics
- Games played: 22

The 2026 U-16 Men's Softball European Championship is the 4th edition of the U-16 Men's Softball European Championship, organised by Europe's governing softball body, the WBSC Europe. The tournament is held in Břeclav and Kunovice, Czech Republic from 30 June to 4 July 2026. It was held concurrently with the U-18 Men's Softball European Championship.

Czech Republic defeated Croatia 7–0 to win the championship.

== Participating teams ==
- Croatia
- Czech Republic
- Denmark
- Great Britain
- Israel

== Opening round ==
Pos	Team	Pld	W	D	L	RF	RA	PCT	GB	Qualification
1	Czech Republic (H)	8	8	0	0	128	5	1.000	—	Advance to final
2	Croatia	8	5	1	2	85	71	.688	2.5	Advance to final
3	Denmark	8	4	1	3	85	57	.563	3.5	Advance to 3rd place match
4	Great Britain	8	2	0	6	41	102	.250	6	Advance to 3rd place match
5	Israel	8	0	0	8	20	124	.000	8	

Source: WBSC Europe
(H) Hosts

Date	Local time	Road team	Score	Home team	Inn.	Venue	Game duration	Attendance	Boxscore
June 30, 2026	10:00	Israel	5–8	Great Britain	6	Kunovice Field –“Mlatevňa” - Field 1	1:48		Boxscore
June 30, 2026	12:15	Denmark	10–11	Croatia	4	Kunovice Field –“Mlatevňa” - Field 1	2:05		Boxscore
June 30, 2026	14:30	Czech Republic	12–0	Great Britain	4	Kunovice Field –“Mlatevňa” - Field 1	1:04		Boxscore
June 30, 2026	16:45	Croatia	23–4	Israel	4	Kunovice Field –“Mlatevňa” - Field 1	2:11	150	Boxscore
June 30, 2026	19:00	Czech Republic	18–2	Denmark	3	Kunovice Field –“Mlatevňa” - Field 1	1:29	150	Boxscore
July 1, 2026	10:00	Great Britain	7–14	Croatia	5	Kunovice Field –“Mlatevňa” - Field 1	1:44		Boxscore
July 1, 2026	12:15	Denmark	15–0	Israel	3	Kunovice Field –“Mlatevňa” - Field 1	1:00		Boxscore
July 1, 2026	14:30	Croatia	0–15	Czech Republic	3	Kunovice Field –“Mlatevňa” - Field 1	1:09		Boxscore
July 1, 2026	16:45	Great Britain	0–13	Denmark	4	Kunovice Field –“Mlatevňa” - Field 1	1:37		Boxscore
July 2, 2026	8:30	Israel	0–17	Czech Republic	3	Břeclav	1:11		Boxscore
July 2, 2026	10:45	Croatia	7–7	Denmark	4	Břeclav	1:32	78	Boxscore
July 2, 2026	12:45	Great Britain	16–9	Israel	4	Břeclav	1:35	84	Boxscore
July 2, 2026	14:45	Denmark	0–15	Czech Republic	3	Břeclav	1:07	90	Boxscore
July 2, 2026	16:45	Israel	1–17	Croatia	3	Břeclav	1:08	93	Boxscore
July 2, 2026	18:45	Great Britain	0–15	Czech Republic	3	Břeclav	0:51	95	Boxscore
July 3, 2026	9:00	Israel	0–15	Denmark	3	Břeclav	1:04	43	Boxscore
July 3, 2026	11:15	Croatia	11–4	Great Britain	5	Břeclav	1:37	72	Boxscore
July 3, 2026	13:30	Czech Republic	13–1	Israel	4	Břeclav	1:14	93	Boxscore
July 3, 2026	15:45	Denmark	23–6	Great Britain	3	Břeclav	1:16	93	Boxscore
July 3, 2026	18:00	Czech Republic	23–2	Croatia	4	Břeclav	1:42	80	Boxscore

== Final ==
=== 3rd place match ===
Date	Local time	Road team	Score	Home team	Inn.	Venue	Game duration	Attendance	Boxscore
July 4, 2026	10:00	Great Britain	2–8	Denmark	6	Břeclav	1:43	112	Boxscore

=== Final ===
Date	Local time	Road team	Score	Home team	Inn.	Venue	Game duration	Attendance	Boxscore
July 4, 2026	12:30	Croatia	0–7	Czech Republic	5	Břeclav	1:30	120	Boxscore

== Final standing ==
Rank	Team
1st place, gold medalist(s)	Czech Republic
2nd place, silver medalist(s)	Croatia
3rd place, bronze medalist(s)	Denmark
4	Great Britain
5	Israel

== External websites ==
- Official website
