= Mason Shaw =

Canadian ice hockey player (born 1998)

- Born: November 3, 1998 (age 28) Lloydminster, Alberta, Canada
- Height: 5 ft 10 in (178 cm)
- Weight: 184 lb (83 kg; 13 st 2 lb)
- Position: Center
- Shoots: Left
- NHL team (P) Cur. team: Minnesota Wild; Iowa Wild (AHL)
- NHL draft: 97th overall, 2017; Minnesota Wild
- Playing career: 2018–present

Mason Shaw (born November 3, 1998) is a Canadian professional ice hockey forward and player for the Iowa Wild in the American Hockey League (AHL) while under contract to the Minnesota Wild in the National Hockey League (NHL). He was selected 97th overall by the Wild in the 2017 NHL entry draft.

Growing up, Shaw played with the Lloydminster Universal Heat of the Alberta Major Bantam League and the Midget AAA Lloydminster Baker Hughes Bobcats of the Alberta Elite Hockey League. During the 2012–13 season, Shaw tallied a team-leading 66 assists and 20 goals for 86 points through 31 games. He was subsequently named a First Team All-Star in the Alberta Midget AAA Hockey League. Shaw played the 2013–14 season with the Bobcats where he finished second in the league in scoring with 17 goals and 33 assists through 31 games and won the Trevor Linder award as the league's Top Forward. His offensive abilities resulted in him being drafted in the second round, 32nd overall, by the Medicine Hat Tigers in the Western Hockey League (WHL) Bantam Draft.

== Early life ==
Shaw was born on November 3, 1998, in Lloydminster, Alberta, Canada, to parents Aaron and Lindsay. He grew up in Wainwright, Alberta where he helped his family on their cattle farm. As a child, Shaw was a fan of the Edmonton Oilers and specifically admired Ales Hemsky.

== Playing career ==
=== Amateur ===
Growing up, Shaw played with the Lloydminster Universal Heat of the Alberta Major Bantam League and the Midget AAA Lloydminster Baker Hughes Bobcats of the Alberta Elite Hockey League. In his first year with the Heat, Shaw scored seven goals and 19 assists for 26 points through 28 games during the 2011–12 season. He later improved to a team-leading 66 assists and 20 goals for 86 points through 31 games. Shaw was subsequently named a 1st Team All-Star in the Alberta Midget AAA Hockey League. During his second season with the Heat, Shaw was one of six players selected to represent Team Northeast at the 2013 U16 Alberta Cup where helped them win the 2013 ATB Alberta Cup. Shaw was eventually drafted in the second round, 32nd overall, by the Medicine Hat Tigers in the Western Hockey League (WHL) Bantam Draft. He participated in the Tigers training camp but was reassigned to the Baker Hughes Bobcats before the final roster was announced. After being reassigned, Shaw competed in the 2013 Western Canada U16 Challenge Cup in Calgary where he won a gold medal with Team Alberta.

Shaw played the 2013–14 season with the Bobcats where he finished second in the league in scoring with 17 goals and 33 assists through 31 games and won the Trevor Linder award as the league's Top Forward. He subsequently made his major junior hockey debut with the Tigers in the 2014–15 season. During the pre-season, Shaw was tied for 4th in league scoring with one goal and seven assists for eight points. His offensive progress continued into the regular season as he helped the Tigers maintain a 4-1-0-0 record to start the season while also leading the team in penalty minutes with nine. Shaw eventually scored his first career WHL goal in his sixth WHL game on October 3 to help the Tigers beat the Saskatoon Blades 8–1. He later missed a few games while competing for Team Canada Red at the World U17 Hockey Challenge and even more due to an injury. He required season-ending surgery after playing only 23 games and accumulating nine points and 13 penalty minutes.

Shaw recovered from his surgery and returned to the Tigers for the 2015–16 season, in which he collected 60 points through 67 games. While playing on a line with Chad Butcher, Shaw's 60 points ranked him second on the team while he also co-received the Tigers Defensive Player Award and Hardest Working Award. Following his breakout season, Shaw was selected to Team Canada's 23-player preliminary roster for the 2016 IIHF World U18 Championships. Shaw tallied one goal and six assists during the tournament to rank fourth in scoring among WHL players.

The 2016-17 season would prove to be Shaw's best overall as he tallied 67 assists and 97 points. He began the seasons strong as he led the league in points and assists during the months of September and October. Over these two months, he had accumulated five goals and 20 assists for 25 points through 14 games. He also played in his 100th career WHL game and recorded his first career five-point game. As such, he was recognized as the WHL's Player of the Month for the months of September and October. Shaw was also added to Team WHL's roster for the 2016 CHL Canada/Russia Series. As a result of his dominate start to the season, Shaw was ranked as a ‘C’ prospect in the NHL Central Scouting Bureaus Players to Watch List. By January, Shaw led the team in assists with 45 and points with 58 to earn a 63rd mid term ranking among North American skaters by the NHL Central Scouting Bureau. As Shaw continued to produce, his ranking increased and his final rank jumped to 55th among North American skaters. He was eventually drafted in the fourth round, 97th overall, by the Minnesota Wild in the 2017 NHL entry draft.

Following the draft, Shaw was invited to represent the Wild at the Traverse City Prospect Tournament in September. During the tournament, he tore his ACL and did not play in a game for the Medicine Hat Tigers during the 2017–18 season.

=== Professional ===
==== Minnesota Wild ====
Having rehabilitated his injury he was signed by the Wild's American Hockey League (AHL) affiliate, the Iowa Wild, on an amateur tryout agreement to end the season. He subsequently made his professional debut on April 10, 2018, in a 2–1 win over the Rockford IceHogs. Shaw was then signed to a three-year, entry-level contract with the Wild on April 27. Following the signing, Shaw returned to the Traverse City Prospect Tournament where he was named an assistant captain. The Wild prospects ended the tournament with a 3–1–0 record, their best record since 2010. After the tournament, Shaw participated in the Wild's training camp but was reassigned to their AHL affiliate on September 22 to begin the 2018–19 season. Shaw made an immediate impact in the AHL by recording three points in their first two games. By the end of October, Shaw was tied with Luke Kunin and Cal O'Reilly for lead scorer with seven points. He continued to produce throughout the following months and entered December tied for second among all rookies in assists with 13 and tied for 10th in points. Throughout the season, Shaw developed into an effective centerman between Kyle Rau and Matt Read and played on the Wild's top line. Shaw finished his rookie season becoming the third rookie in franchise history to play in every regular season game. During the 76-game stretch, he tallied eight goals and 25 assists for 33 points. As the Iowa Wild qualified for the 2019 Calder Cup playoffs, he added one goal in three playoff games before suffering another ACL injury in Game 3.

Shaw spent the 2019 offseason recovering from the ACL injury and was expected to return to the Iowa Wild lineup by New Year's. He eventually made his 2019–20 season debut on January 17, 2020, against the San Jose Barracuda. He scored his first goal of the season later in early February, marking his first regular season goal since April 23, 2019. His return was short-lived however as the AHL suspended play due to the COVID-19 pandemic on May 11, 2020. Once sports leagues resumed play for the 2020–21 season, Shaw rejoined the Iowa Wild following an unsuccessful NHL training camp. Although he was later named to Minnesota's Taxi Squad, Shaw was selected to serve as an alternate captain for the Iowa Wild during their 2020–21 campaign. Shaw played in the AHL for the duration of the 2020–21 season, accumulating eight goals and 14 assists for 22 points through 30 games to tie for third on the team in scoring.

After being made a qualifying offer by the Wild, Shaw signed a two-year, two-way contract with an average annual value of $750,000 at the NHL level on August 17, 2021. Following the signing, the Iowa Wild announced Shaw would again serve as an alternate captain for the team during their 2021–22 season. Shaw tallied 14 points through the Wild's first 18 games before receiving his first recall to the NHL on December 5, 2021. He subsequently made his NHL debut a few days later, recording two shots on goal in 10:38 of ice time in a 5–2 win over the San Jose Sharks on December 9, 2021. He played in one more game before being returned to the Iowa Wild. Upon returning to the AHL, Shaw recorded his first career AHL hat-trick in a 4–3 win over the Manitoba Moose on January 19, 2022. He completed his fourth season with the Iowa Wild by being named the recipient of the Professional Hockey Players' Association (PHPA) Player Representative of the Year Award for the 2021–22 season.

Following the departure of Kyle Rau and the promotion of Marco Rossi to the Minnesota Wild, Shaw was named team captain of the Iowa Wild for the 2022–23 season. He scored one goal and accumulated four penalty minutes through two games as captain before being recalled to the NHL level on October 16. He played one game with Minnesota before being reassigned to the AHL on October 20. Shaw was quickly brought back to the NHL on October 21 and he scored his first NHL goal against the Chicago Blackhawks on October 30. He quickly earned praise from coach Dean Evason who complimented Shaw's ability to "get his nose dirty every shift" while playing alongside Connor Dewar and Sam Steel. Shaw remained at the NHL level for most of November before being informed he would be a mainstay in the lineup. Following a game against the San Jose Sharks, Shaw was suspended for two games and forfeited $8,108.10 for kneeing forward Evgeny Svechnikov during the Wild's win.

==== Winnipeg Jets ====
On July 3, 2024, Shaw signed as a free agent to a one-year, two-way contract with the Winnipeg Jets. On July 3, 2025, Shaw re-signed with Winnipeg for another one-year, two-way contract in the 2025–26 season. On October 9, 2025, the Manitoba Moose would name Shaw their 13th captain in franchise history. He remained within the Jets organization for two seasons, playing exclusively with the Moose.

==== Return to Minnesota ====
As a free agent at the conclusion of his tenure with the Jets, Shaw opted to return to the Minnesota Wild, signing a one-year, two-way contract for the 2026–27 season on July 1, 2026.

== Career statistics ==
=== Regular season and playoffs ===
			Regular season					Playoffs
Season	Team	League	GP	G	A	Pts	PIM	GP	G	A	Pts	PIM
2011–12	Lloydminster Heat	AMBHL	28	7	19	26	42	9	4	2	6	8
2012–13	Lloydminster Heat	AMBHL	31	20	66	86	66	3	5	2	7	10
2013–14	Lloydminster Bobcats	AMHL	31	17	33	50	42	—	—	—	—	—
2014–15	Medicine Hat Tigers	WHL	23	3	6	9	13	—	—	—	—	—
2015–16	Medicine Hat Tigers	WHL	67	17	43	60	72	—	—	—	—	—
2016–17	Medicine Hat Tigers	WHL	71	27	67	94	57	11	0	12	12	16
2017–18	Iowa Wild	AHL	1	0	0	0	0	—	—	—	—	—
2018–19	Iowa Wild	AHL	76	8	25	33	43	3	1	0	1	2
2019–20	Iowa Wild	AHL	17	3	3	6	8	—	—	—	—	—
2020–21	Iowa Wild	AHL	30	8	14	22	39	—	—	—	—	—
2021–22	Iowa Wild	AHL	62	19	33	52	106	—	—	—	—	—
2021–22	Minnesota Wild	NHL	3	0	0	0	5	—	—	—	—	—
2022–23	Iowa Wild	AHL	2	1	0	1	4	—	—	—	—	—
2022–23	Minnesota Wild	NHL	59	7	10	17	79	—	—	—	—	—
2023–24	Iowa Wild	AHL	9	4	3	7	13	—	—	—	—	—
2023–24	Minnesota Wild	NHL	20	1	2	3	34	—	—	—	—	—
2024–25	Manitoba Moose	AHL	72	17	20	37	114	—	—	—	—	—
2025–26	Manitoba Moose	AHL	71	15	29	44	67	7	2	0	2	8
NHL totals			82	8	12	20	118	—	—	—	—	—

=== International ===
Year	Team	Event	Result	GP	G	A	Pts	PIM
2014	Canada Red	U17	6th	5	0	1	1	2
2016	Canada	U18	4th	7	1	6	7	8
Junior totals				12	1	7	8	10

== Awards and honours ==
Award	Year
AMHL
First All-Star Team	2014
Top Forward	2014
