= 2010–11 Carleton Lady Ravens ice hockey season =

The 2010-11 Carleton Ravens represented Carleton University in Ottawa, Ontario, Canada during the 2010-11 CIS women's hockey season. The head coach is Shelley Coolidge.

== Exhibition ==
On March 26, the Ravens participated in the Shoot for the Stars charitye hockey game to raise funds for the Children's Wish Foundation.

Date	Opponent	Score
Sept 3	Norwegian national team	2-1
March 26	Ottawa Senators (PWHL)	1-3

== Roster ==
Number	Player	Position	Years
3	Kaila Lassaline	Forward	4
4	Jasmine Levesque	Defense	1
6	Sarah MacLean	Defense	1
7	Claudia Bergeron	Centre	4
8	Victoria Gouge	Defense	2
9	Erin Beaver	Defense	2
10	Veronic Auger	Forward	1
11	Olivia Sutter	Center	1
12	Kristen Marson	Defense	5
13	Kate Allan	Forward	1
14	Kristen MacDonald	Forward	3
15	Stephanie Plourde	Defense	2
16	Alexandra Yallouz	Forward	1
17	Sara Seiler	Forward	4
18	Sydnie MacDonald	Centre	2
19	Kelsey Vander Veen	Defense	2
21	Blaire MacDonald	Defense	2
22	Brittany Simpson	Forward	1
30	Tamber Tisdale	Goaltender	1
31	Victoria Powers	Goaltender	1
44	Sadie Wegner	Forward	1
77	Erica Skinner	Defense	4
91	Melanie McKnight	Defense	4
98	Eri Kiribuchi	Goalie	2

== Postseason ==
Date	Opponent	Score
Feb 23	McGill Martlets	0-1
Feb 25	McGill Martlets	0-4

== Awards and honors ==
- Olivia Sutter, Carleton Lady Ravens Rookie of the Year
- Kristen Marson: 2011 Carleton University Most Outstanding Graduating Female Athlete

=== RSEQ Awards ===
- Claudia Bergeron, 2011 RSEQ Second All-Star Team
- Kristen Marson, 2011 RSEQ Second All-Star Team
- Erica Skinner, RSEQ's candidate for the Marion Hilliard Award (The Marion Hilliard Award is presented annually to the CIS women's hockey player who best combines academic and sport excellence with community involvement.)
