= Cal O'Reilly =

Canadian ice hockey player (born 1986)

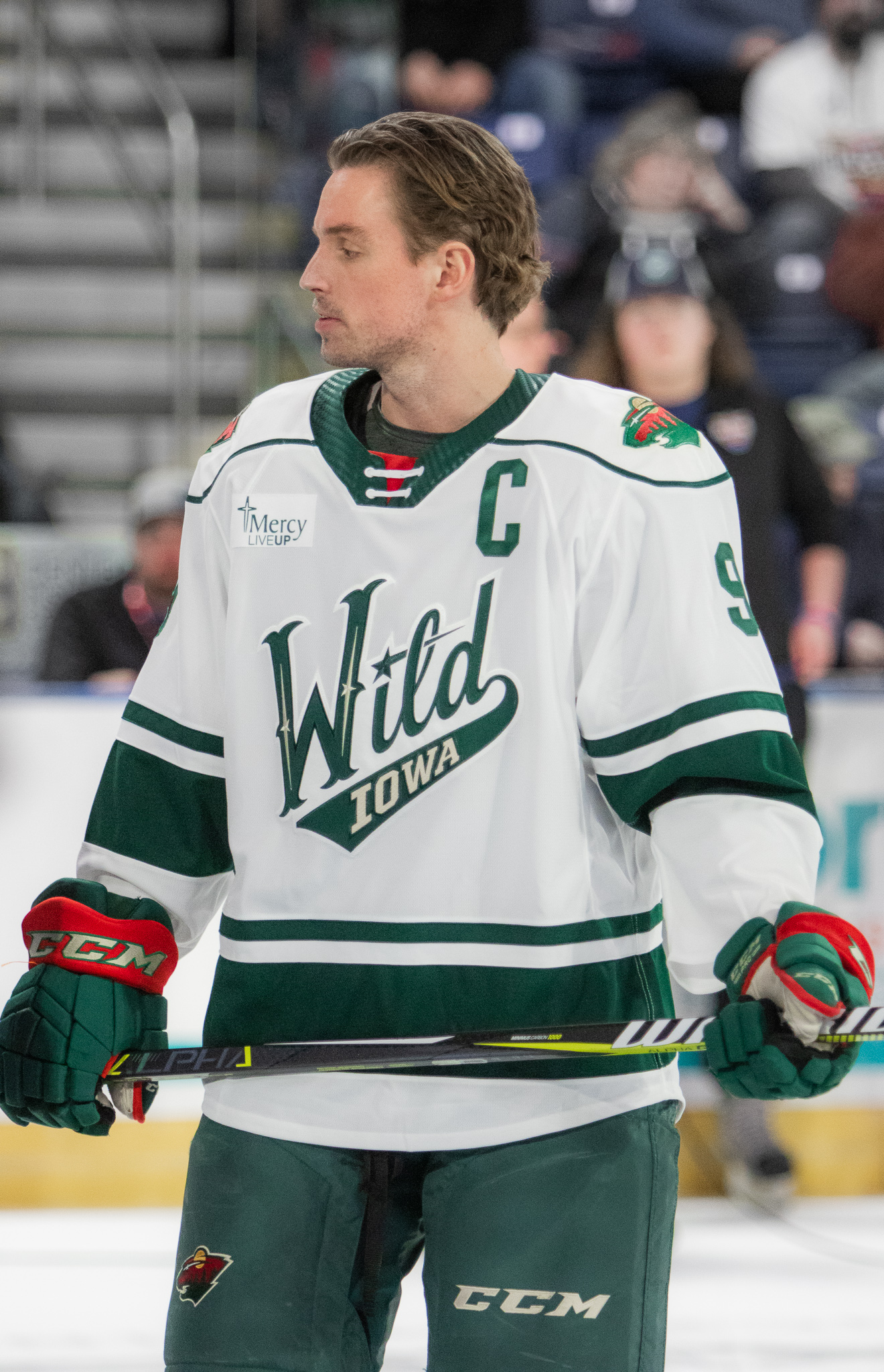
- O'Reilly with the Iowa Wild in 2019
- Born: September 30, 1986 (age 40) Toronto, Ontario, Canada
- Height: 6 ft 0 in (183 cm)
- Weight: 188 lb (85 kg; 13 st 6 lb)
- Position: Centre
- Shot: Left
- Played for: Nashville Predators; Phoenix Coyotes; Pittsburgh Penguins; Metallurg Magnitogorsk; Buffalo Sabres; Minnesota Wild; SCL Tigers; Vålerenga
- NHL draft: 150th overall, 2005; Nashville Predators
- Playing career: 2006–2026

Calahan O'Reilly (born September 30, 1986) is a Canadian former professional ice hockey centre, who played in the National Hockey League (NHL) for the Nashville Predators, Phoenix Coyotes, Pittsburgh Penguins, and Buffalo Sabres. He is currently an assistant coach with the Oshawa Generals of the Ontario Hockey League. O'Reilly's younger brother Ryan is currently a centre for the Nashville Predators.

== Playing career ==
O'Reilly grew up in the small community of Seaforth, Ontario, playing minor hockey for the Seaforth Stars and the Huron-Perth Lakers (MHAO). After his minor midget season he was drafted in the 8th round (150th overall) by the Windsor Spitfires in the 2002 OHL Priority Selection. O'Reilly played the 2002–03 season with the St. Marys Lincolns Jr.B. team of the Western Ontario Hockey League (OHA), where he led all rookies in scoring and made the WOHL All-Rookie Team, prior to suiting up for the Windsor Spitfires the following season.

In his rookie season (2003–2004) O'Reilly struggled offensively out of the gate, scoring just 3 goals and tallying 18 assists for a total of 21 points, and was a -1 on the season, but was a strong defensive contributor on a defensively weak team, and also greatly improved his penalty killing and stick checking ability throughout this season. In the playoffs, O'Reilly dressed in 3 of the team's 4 games, tallying 1 assist and was a -minus 2. The following season (2004–05), O'Reilly came back as a man on a mission, tallying 24 goals and 50 assists, for a total of 74 points, finishing 2nd in Team Scoring, while also establishing the best plus minus rating on the team at +9, providing more evidence to O'Reilly's strong defensive game as a Centre. During the 2005 playoffs, O'Reilly helped lead the Spitfires to the second round, tallying 4 goals and 5 assists, for 9 points, placing him tied for second in team playoff scoring.

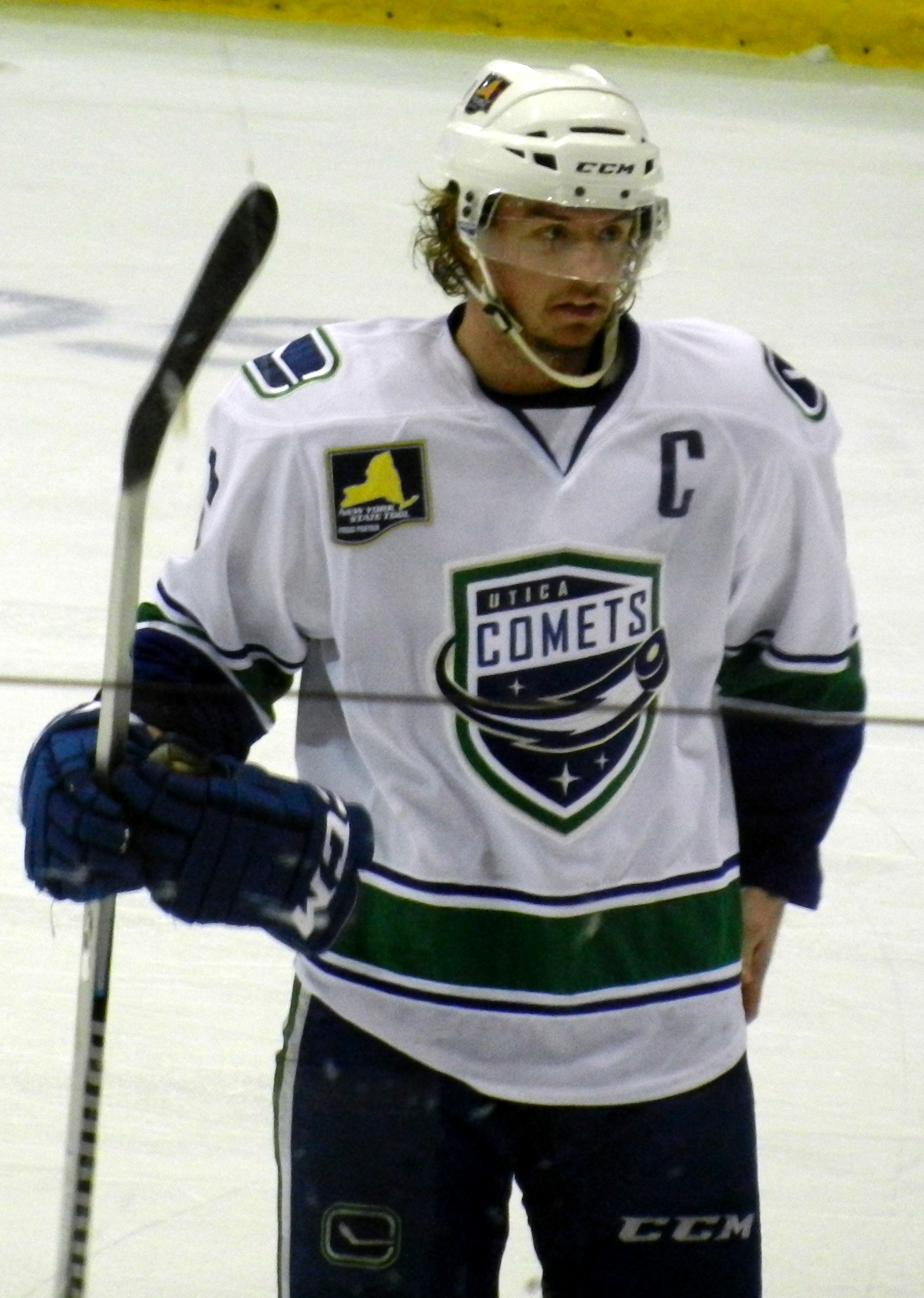
O'Reilly as the captain of the Utica Comets.

O'Reilly would return for the 2005–06 season as a third year Spitfire veteran to truly lead by example, setting the team scoring pace by tallying 18 goals and 81 assists (tied for 3rd in the league with Wojtek Wolski). The closest Spitfire trailed O'Reilly by 47 points (Ryan Garlock 20 goals, 32 assists, 52 points)

O'Reilly was drafted 150th overall in the fifth round of the 2005 NHL entry draft by the Nashville Predators. He played with the Windsor Spitfires of the Ontario Hockey League (OHL) from 2003–04 to 2005–06. He made his NHL debut in 2008–09. O'Reilly scored his first NHL goal against Los Angeles Kings goalie Jonathan Quick on March 28, 2009.

On July 7, 2011, O'Reilly signed a one-year contract with the Nashville Predators. At the start of the following 2011–12 season on October 28, 2011, O'Reilly was traded from the Predators to the Phoenix Coyotes for a 4th-round draft pick in 2012.

On February 1, 2012, O'Reilly was picked up on waivers by the Pittsburgh Penguins. He made his debut with the team 3 days later against Boston Bruins. He recorded his first point with the Penguins on February 5 against the New Jersey Devils.

On July 16, 2012, O'Reilly signed a two-year contract with the Kontinental Hockey League (KHL) team, Metallurg Magnitogorsk.

After a successful debut season with Metallurg, due to injury O'Reilly failed to replicate his form and was released from his second year after only 14 games. On November 19, 2013, O'Reilly signed a standard player contract (SPC) for the remainder of the 2013–14 season with the Utica Comets of the AHL. He was instrumental in turning the Comets season around, scoring 45 points in 52 games in falling short of the playoffs.

On July 2, 2014, O'Reilly signed a contract with the Comets parent NHL club, the Vancouver Canucks on a one-year deal. O'Reilly was returned on assignment to Captain the Utica Comets for the 2014–15 season.

On July 1, 2015, O'Reilly signed a two-year one-way contract with the Buffalo Sabres, worth $700,000 per year, uniting him with his newly acquired brother Ryan.

Entering the 2016–17 season, O'Reilly continued his second year within the Sabres organization as the captain of AHL affiliate, the Rochester Americans. He was recalled and featured in 11 games with the Sabres for 1 assist, however primarily remained with the cellar-dwelling Americans with 42 points in 47 games. O'Reilly was loaned by the Sabres organization to the Toronto Marlies on March 8, 2017.

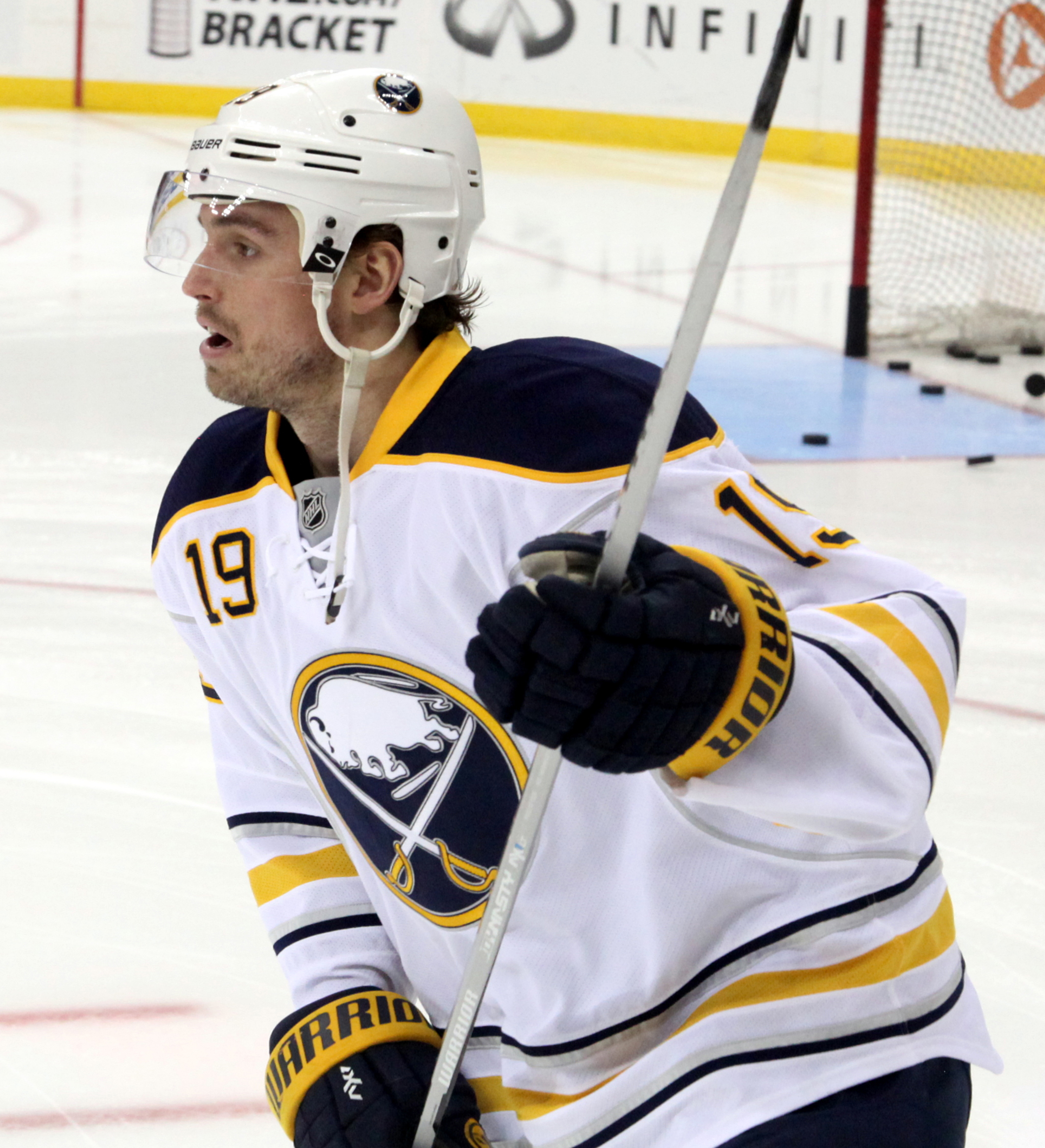
O'Reilly with the Sabres in 2016.

On July 1, 2017, O'Reilly left the Sabres as a free agent, signing a two-year, two-way deal with the Minnesota Wild.

After playing the majority of his contract with the Wild as captain of the Iowa Wild in the AHL, O'Reilly left as a free agent to continue in the AHL by signing a two-year deal with the Lehigh Valley Phantoms, affiliate to the Philadelphia Flyers, on July 1, 2019.

On April 26, 2021, O'Reilly recorded 3 assists for the Lehigh Valley Phantoms in a win over the Binghamton Devils, giving him 500 career assists in the American Hockey League. O'Reilly is the 10th player in the league's history to record 500 assists. During the 2021–2022 season, he reached the 1,000 games played milestone.

On July 3, 2023, O'Reilly was signed to a one-year, one-way AHL contract to rejoin the Milwaukee Admirals.

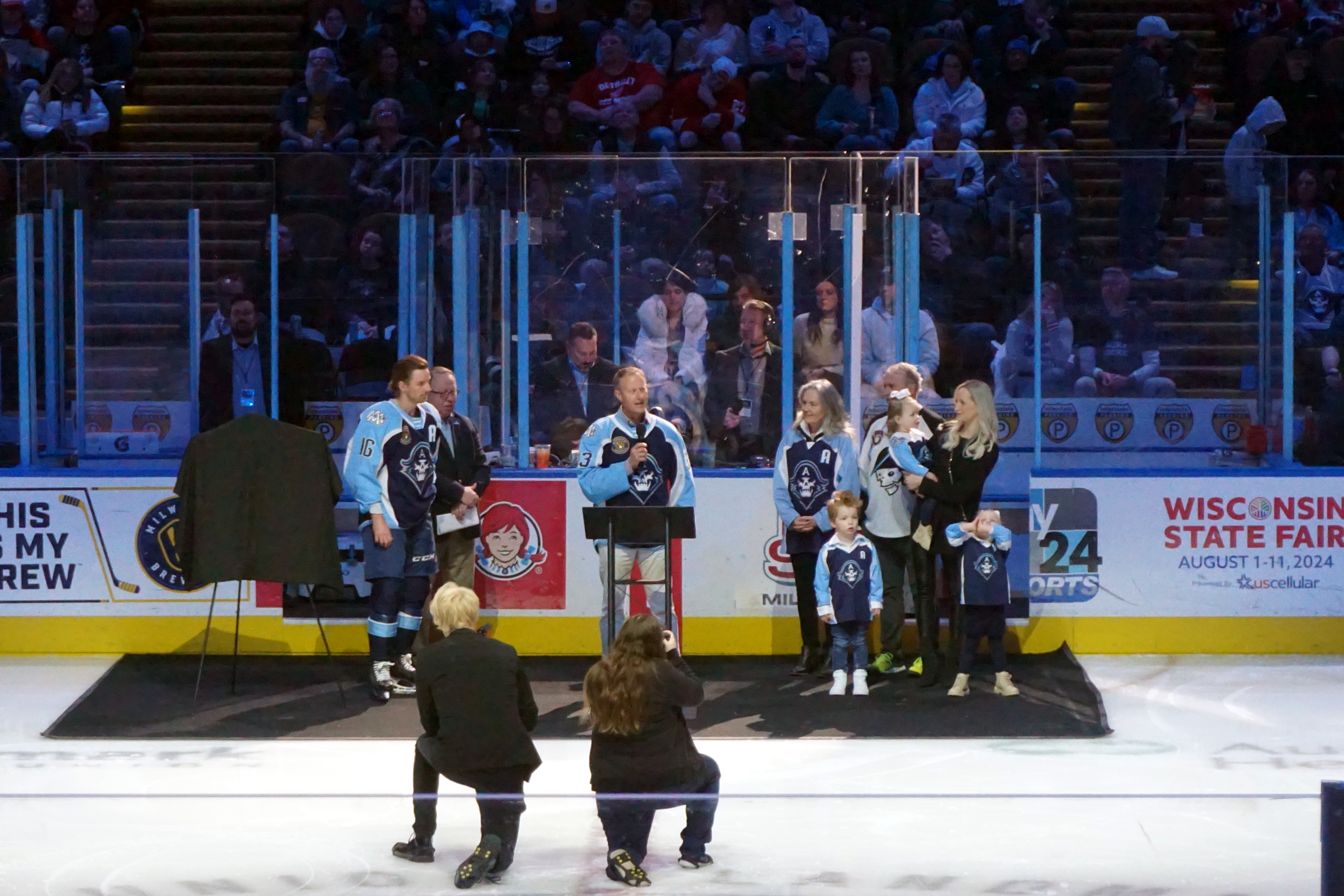
Cal O'Reilly being recognized as the all-time Admirals scoring record holder

On February 24, 2024, O’Reilly became the all-time leading scorer for the Milwaukee Admirals franchise. During the 2024–25 season, he played his thousandth AHL regular season game, becoming only the ninth player in league history to reach that milestone. At the conclusion of the season, he received the Fred T. Hunt Memorial Award, awarded annually to the league player who "best exemplifies the qualities of sportsmanship, determination and dedication to hockey."

== Personal life ==
O'Reilly is of Irish descent through his paternal grandparents. His younger brother Ryan has played with the Colorado Avalanche, Buffalo Sabres, St. Louis Blues, Toronto Maple Leafs, and Nashville Predators. His sister, Tara O'Reilly, served as captain of the Carleton Ravens women's ice hockey program in 2009. His cousin Bill Bowler is currently the General Manager of the Windsor Spitfires in the Ontario Hockey League. As a player Bowler holds the team record for most career points for the Spitfires, and is one of the OHL's leading career points scorers.

O'Reilly is married to former Canadian figure skater Terra Findlay.

== Career statistics ==
| | | | Regular season | | | | | Playoffs |
| Season | Team | League | GP | G | A | Pts | PIM | GP | G | A | Pts | PIM |
|---|---|---|---|---|---|---|---|---|---|---|---|---|
| 2002–03 | St. Marys Lincolns | WOHL | 46 | 11 | 19 | 30 | 2 | — | — | — | — | — |
| 2003–04 | Windsor Spitfires | OHL | 61 | 3 | 18 | 21 | 2 | 3 | 0 | 1 | 1 | 0 |
| 2004–05 | Windsor Spitfires | OHL | 68 | 23 | 50 | 73 | 16 | 11 | 4 | 5 | 9 | 4 |
| 2005–06 | Windsor Spitfires | OHL | 68 | 18 | 81 | 99 | 8 | 7 | 3 | 8 | 11 | 0 |
| 2005–06 | Milwaukee Admirals | AHL | 2 | 0 | 0 | 0 | 0 | 10 | 0 | 1 | 1 | 0 |
| 2006–07 | Milwaukee Admirals | AHL | 78 | 18 | 47 | 65 | 20 | 4 | 1 | 2 | 3 | 0 |
| 2007–08 | Milwaukee Admirals | AHL | 80 | 16 | 63 | 79 | 22 | 6 | 1 | 2 | 3 | 0 |
| 2008–09 | Milwaukee Admirals | AHL | 67 | 13 | 56 | 69 | 20 | 11 | 2 | 6 | 8 | 0 |
| 2008–09 | Nashville Predators | NHL | 11 | 3 | 2 | 5 | 2 | — | — | — | — | — |
| 2009–10 | Milwaukee Admirals | AHL | 35 | 9 | 31 | 40 | 8 | — | — | — | — | — |
| 2009–10 | Nashville Predators | NHL | 31 | 2 | 9 | 11 | 4 | — | — | — | — | — |
| 2010–11 | Nashville Predators | NHL | 38 | 6 | 12 | 18 | 2 | — | — | — | — | — |
| 2011–12 | Nashville Predators | NHL | 5 | 0 | 1 | 1 | 2 | — | — | — | — | — |
| 2011–12 | Phoenix Coyotes | NHL | 22 | 2 | 3 | 5 | 2 | — | — | — | — | — |
| 2011–12 | Portland Pirates | AHL | 5 | 1 | 1 | 2 | 0 | — | — | — | — | — |
| 2011–12 | Wilkes–Barre/Scranton Penguins | AHL | 21 | 0 | 10 | 10 | 8 | 12 | 5 | 4 | 9 | 0 |
| 2011–12 | Pittsburgh Penguins | NHL | 6 | 0 | 1 | 1 | 0 | — | — | — | — | — |
| 2012–13 | Metallurg Magnitogorsk | KHL | 32 | 3 | 16 | 19 | 30 | 7 | 2 | 2 | 4 | 2 |
| 2013–14 | Metallurg Magnitogorsk | KHL | 14 | 0 | 1 | 1 | 2 | — | — | — | — | — |
| 2013–14 | Utica Comets | AHL | 52 | 7 | 38 | 45 | 6 | — | — | — | — | — |
| 2014–15 | Utica Comets | AHL | 76 | 10 | 51 | 61 | 10 | 23 | 2 | 17 | 19 | 4 |
| 2015–16 | Rochester Americans | AHL | 47 | 6 | 23 | 29 | 6 | — | — | — | — | — |
| 2015–16 | Buffalo Sabres | NHL | 20 | 3 | 4 | 7 | 2 | — | — | — | — | — |
| 2016–17 | Rochester Americans | AHL | 47 | 9 | 33 | 42 | 6 | — | — | — | — | — |
| 2016–17 | Buffalo Sabres | NHL | 11 | 0 | 1 | 1 | 0 | — | — | — | — | — |
| 2016–17 | Toronto Marlies | AHL | 15 | 0 | 8 | 8 | 4 | 11 | 1 | 6 | 7 | 0 |
| 2017–18 | Iowa Wild | AHL | 75 | 15 | 49 | 64 | 10 | — | — | — | — | — |
| 2017–18 | Minnesota Wild | NHL | 1 | 0 | 0 | 0 | 0 | — | — | — | — | — |
| 2018–19 | Iowa Wild | AHL | 67 | 16 | 51 | 67 | 14 | 11 | 3 | 6 | 9 | 6 |
| 2019–20 | Lehigh Valley Phantoms | AHL | 52 | 6 | 23 | 29 | 8 | — | — | — | — | — |
| 2020–21 | Lehigh Valley Phantoms | AHL | 32 | 4 | 19 | 23 | 12 | — | — | — | — | — |
| 2021–22 | Lehigh Valley Phantoms | AHL | 75 | 21 | 32 | 53 | 20 | — | — | — | — | — |
| 2022–23 | Lehigh Valley Phantoms | AHL | 59 | 5 | 13 | 18 | 8 | 2 | 0 | 0 | 0 | 0 |
| 2023–24 | Milwaukee Admirals | AHL | 69 | 10 | 20 | 30 | 6 | 15 | 2 | 4 | 6 | 0 |
| 2024–25 | Milwaukee Admirals | AHL | 68 | 11 | 38 | 49 | 4 | 10 | 2 | 1 | 3 | 2 |
| NHL totals | | | 145 | 16 | 33 | 49 | 14 | — | — | — | — | — |
