= 2011–12 Carleton Lady Ravens ice hockey season =

2011–12 Carleton Ravens women's ice hockey season
- Conference: 4 QSSF
- Home ice: Carleton Ice Arena

Rankings
- CIS: Not ranked

Record
- Overall: 6-6-3

Coaches and captains
- Head coach: Shelley Coolidge
- Assistant coaches: Mandi Duhamel; Miguel Filiatrault; Valerie Charbonneau
- Captain(s): Sydnie MacDonald; Sadie Wegner

The Carleton Lady Ravens women's ice hockey program represents Carleton University in Ottawa, Ontario, Canada.

== Preseason ==
Date	Opponent	Location	Score
Sept. 17	York	York University	1-0 Loss
Sept. 18	Ryerson	York University	3-0 Win

=== Carleton Ravens invitational tournament ===
Date	Teams	Rink	Score
Sept. 22	Queen's vs. Ottawa	Carleton Rink A	Queen's 4 – Ottawa 3 SO
Sept. 22	Calgary vs. Toronto	Carleton Rink B	Calgary 3 – Toronto 1
Sept. 22	Carleton vs. UBC	Carleton Rink A	Carleton 7 – UBC 1
Sept. 23	Toronto vs. Carleton	Carleton Rink A	Toronto 4 – Carleton 3
Sept. 23	Ottawa vs. UBC	Carleton Rink B	Ottawa 2 – UBC 0
Sept. 23	Queen's vs. Calgary	Carleton Rink A	Calgary 6 – Queen's 1
Sept. 24	UBC vs. Queen's	Carleton Rink A	Queen's 2 – UBC 0
Sept. 24	Toronto vs. Ottawa	Carleton Rink B	Ottawa 3 – Toronto 2 SO
Sept. 24	Calgary vs. Carleton	Carleton Rink A	Calgary 5 – Carleton 0
Sept. 25	Calgary vs. Ottawa	Carleton Rink A	Calgary 4 – Ottawa 2
Sept. 25	Toronto vs. UBC	Carleton Rink B	UBC 3 – Toronto 0
Sept. 25	Carleton vs. Queen's	Carleton Rink A	Queen's 5 – Carleton 2

== Regular season ==
- In her first two games back from injury, forward Claudia Bergeron helped the Lady Ravens remain undefeated in regulation. On October 22, Bergeron assisted on the Lady Ravens third goal of the game in a 4-3 shootout loss to the cross-town Ottawa Gee-Gees. In the October 23 4-2 victory over Concordia, she notched two goals (including one on the first shot of the game) before the midway point of the first period.
- October 30: Despite outshooting the Martlets 49-21, the Ravens were bested by a 3-0 tally. The game was scoreless through two periods, although Ravens skater Claudia Bergeron beat Martlets goaltender Charline Labonte with a shot in the second period. The shot hit the crossbar, but the Martlets registered a trio of goals (including an empty net goal) to win the match. Ann-Sophie Bettez scored the game-winning goal and was recognized as the player of the game for the Martlets, while Ravens goaltender Tamber Tisdale was player of the game for the Ravens.
- From November 25 to November 26, 2011, Tamber Tisdale did not allow any even strength goals. In a contest versus the Montreal Carabins, Tisdale made 40 saves in a 6-5 victory. The following day, she stopped 34 shots as she earned her first shutout of the season, in a 3-0 blanking of the Concordia Stingers. After the win, she was the QSSF leader with a save percentage of .930.
- On January 22, 2012, Tisdale helped the Ravens to their first ever victory over the McGill Martlets. The number one ranked Martlets were stunned by a 4-3 mark in a shootout. She made 32 of 35 saves in regulation time while stopping five of six Martlets in the shootout.
- February 4: In a tribute to the late Daron Richardson, daughter of Ottawa Senators assistant coach, Luke Richardson, the Ravens were on the winning end of a 5-4 shootout win against the Concordia Stingers. The club held a charity drive for the Daron Richardson Fund (known as Do It For Daron), a program focused on raising awareness about youth mental health. Bruce MacDonald, Daron's former coach and the father of Ravens player Kristen MacDonald participated in the ceremonial face off.

The win helped the Ravens clinch a playoff berth as they posted a 6-6-3 record. The lead changed multiple times during the match. Mallory Lawton and Danielle Scarlett contributed to an early 2-0 Stingers lead. Kristen MacDonald and Melanie McKnight tied the game until Catherine Rancourt gave Concordia the lead.

Claudia Bergeron tied the game, but Concordia would break the tie in the third period. Meghan George would notch her first tally of the season. Team captain Sara Seiler netted a goal on own rebound forcing overtime. Tamber Tisdale made 42 saves in the game, as the Ravens claimed victory in the shootout.

- February 5: Kelsey Vander Veen notched a hat trick (all goals were scored in the second period) as the Ravens fought back from a three-goal deficit versus the Montreal Carabins. The Ravens would go on to win the match by a 6-5 mark in a shootout. Vander Veen scored her first goal 30 seconds after Carleton found themselves down by a 4-1 mark. With less than a minute to go in the second period, she completed the natural hat trick.

=== Schedule ===
Date	Opponent	Location	Time	Score
Oct. 15	Montreal Carabins	Carleton University	2 p.m.	2-3 (OT)
Oct. 16	Concordia Stingers	Concordia University	3 p.m.	3-2
Oct. 22	Ottawa Gee-Gees	Carleton University	7 p.m.	3-4
Oct. 23	Concordia Stingers	Carleton University	2 p.m.	4-2
Oct. 29	Ottawa Gee-Gees	University of Ottawa	7 p.m.	3-6
Oct. 30	McGill Martlets	Carleton University	2 p.m.	0-3
Nov. 12	McGill Martlets	McGill University	8 p.m.	
Nov. 19	Ottawa Gee-Gees	Carleton University	7 p.m.	
Nov. 25	Montreal Carabins	Universite de Montreal	7 p.m.	
Nov. 26	Concordia Stingers	Carleton University	7 p.m.	
Jan. 14	Ottawa Gee-Gees	Ottawa	2 p.m.	
Jan. 22	McGill Martlets	McGill University	2 p.m.	
Jan. 28	McGill Martlets	Carleton University	2 p.m.	
Jan. 29	Montreal Carabins	UdeM	2 p.m.	
Feb. 4	Concordia Stingers	Carleton University	7 p.m.	5-4 (SO)
Feb. 5	Montreal Carabins	Universite de Montreal	2 p.m.	6-5
Feb. 11	McGill Martlets	Carleton University	7 p.m.	
Feb. 12	Concordia Stingers	Concordia University	3 p.m.	
Feb. 18	Ottawa Gee-Gees	University of Ottawa	2 p.m.	
Feb. 19	Montreal Carabins	Carleton University	2 p.m.	

=== Current roster ===
Date	Opponent	Location	Time	Score
1	Tamber Tisdale	Goaltender	5-9	Notre Dame College
31	Victoria Powers	Goaltender	5-5	Durham Lightning
98	Eri Kiribuchi	Goaltender	5-3	Bemidji State
3	Kaila Lassaline - A	Forward	5-3	Bluewater Jr. Hawks
4	Jasmine Levesque	Defence	5-3	Balmoral Hall
5	Chantal Rivest	Forward	5-8	Team Yukon
7	Claudia Bergeron - A	Forward	5-2	Cegep Limoilou
8	Victoria Gouge	Forward	5-11	Oakville Jr. Ice
9	Erin Beaver	Defence	5-11	Oakville Jr. Ice
12	Ainslee Kent	Forward	5-5	Peterborough Jr. Ice Cats
13	Jessica O'Grady	Forward	5-6	
14	Kristen MacDonald	Forward	5-2	Nepean Jr. Raiders
15	Stephanie Plourde	Defence	5-6	
16	Alexandra Yallouz	Forward	5-4	Nepean Jr. Raiders
17	Sara Seiler - C	Forward	5-7	German National Team
18	Sydnie MacDonald	Forward	5-3	Nepean Wildcats
19	Kelsey Vander Veen	Defence	5-11	Kitchener-Waterloo Rangers
20	Alexandra Monuk	Defence	5-3	Plattsburg State
21	Blaire MacDonald - A	Defence	5-7	Brampton Jr. Thunder
22	Brittany Simpson	Forward	5-5	Ontario Hockey Academy
44	Sadie Wegner	Forward	5-6	Ottawa Lady Senators
91	Melanie McKnight	Defence	5-7	Aurora Jr. Panthers

== Awards and honours ==
- Claudia Bergeron, Carleton University Female Athlete of the Week (Week of October 24, 2011)
- Tamber Tisdale, Carleton University Female Athlete of the Week (Week ending November 27, 2011)
- Tamber Tisdale, Carleton University Female Athlete of the Week (Week ending January 22, 2012)
- Kelsey Vander Veen, Carleton University Female Athlete of the Week (Week ending February 5, 2012)
