= Iowa Wild =

American Hockey League team in Des Moines, Iowa

- City: Des Moines, Iowa
- League: American Hockey League
- Conference: Western
- Division: Central
- Founded: 1994 (IHL)
- Operated: 2013–present
- Home arena: Casey's Center
- Colors: Forest green, Iron Range red, harvest gold, Minnesota wheat, white
- Owner: Minnesota Sports and Entertainment
- General manager: Matt Hendricks
- Head coach: Stu Bickel
- Captain: Mason Shaw
- Media: KXNO; AHL.TV (Internet)
- Affiliates: Minnesota Wild (NHL); Jacksonville Icemen (ECHL)
- Website: www.iowawild.com

Franchise history
- 1994–2013: Houston Aeros
- 2013–present: Iowa Wild

The Iowa Wild are a professional ice hockey team based in Des Moines, Iowa. They are the American Hockey League (AHL) affiliate of the Minnesota Wild of the National Hockey League (NHL). The Wild play their home games at Casey's Center.

The team was formerly the Houston Aeros, in Houston, Texas, before being relocated to Des Moines, beginning with the 2013–14 AHL season as the Iowa Wild. The Wild is the second AHL team based in Des Moines following the Iowa Stars, which had been the Dallas Stars' AHL affiliate from 2005 until 2008 (in the team's final season (2008–09), they were known as the Iowa Chops and were affiliated with the Anaheim Ducks).

The affiliation between the two Wild franchises is the first of two between Twin Cities area franchises and Iowa minor league franchises, as the Minnesota Timberwolves of the National Basketball Association and the Iowa Wolves of the NBA G League also share an affiliation.

== History ==
The Iowa Wild franchise began as the Houston Aeros, a 1994 expansion team in the International Hockey League (IHL) that played out of the Compaq Center. The Aeros were one of six IHL teams to join the American Hockey League (AHL) in 2001 when the IHL folded. Upon joining the AHL, the Aeros affiliated with the National Hockey League's one-year-old expansion team, the Minnesota Wild. The AHL version of the Aeros won the 2003 Calder Cup and also reached the 2011 Calder Cup finals, but lost to the Binghamton Senators. In 2003, the majority ownership of the franchise was sold to Minnesota Sports and Entertainment, the ownership group of the Wild, while former owner Chuck Watson retained a 10% minority share along with Houston native Nick Sheppard holding a 4% share. The team then moved home games to the new Toyota Center.

On April 18, 2013, the Minnesota Wild announced that Minnesota Sports and Entertainment were unable to reach a lease agreement with the Toyota Center, and the Aeros would be relocated to Des Moines, Iowa, beginning with the 2013–14 season with home games at Wells Fargo Arena. The Iowa Wild inaugural season was opened on October 12 with a 1–0 win over the Oklahoma City Barons. The opening night attendance was 10,200. The team failed to make the playoffs for its first five seasons.

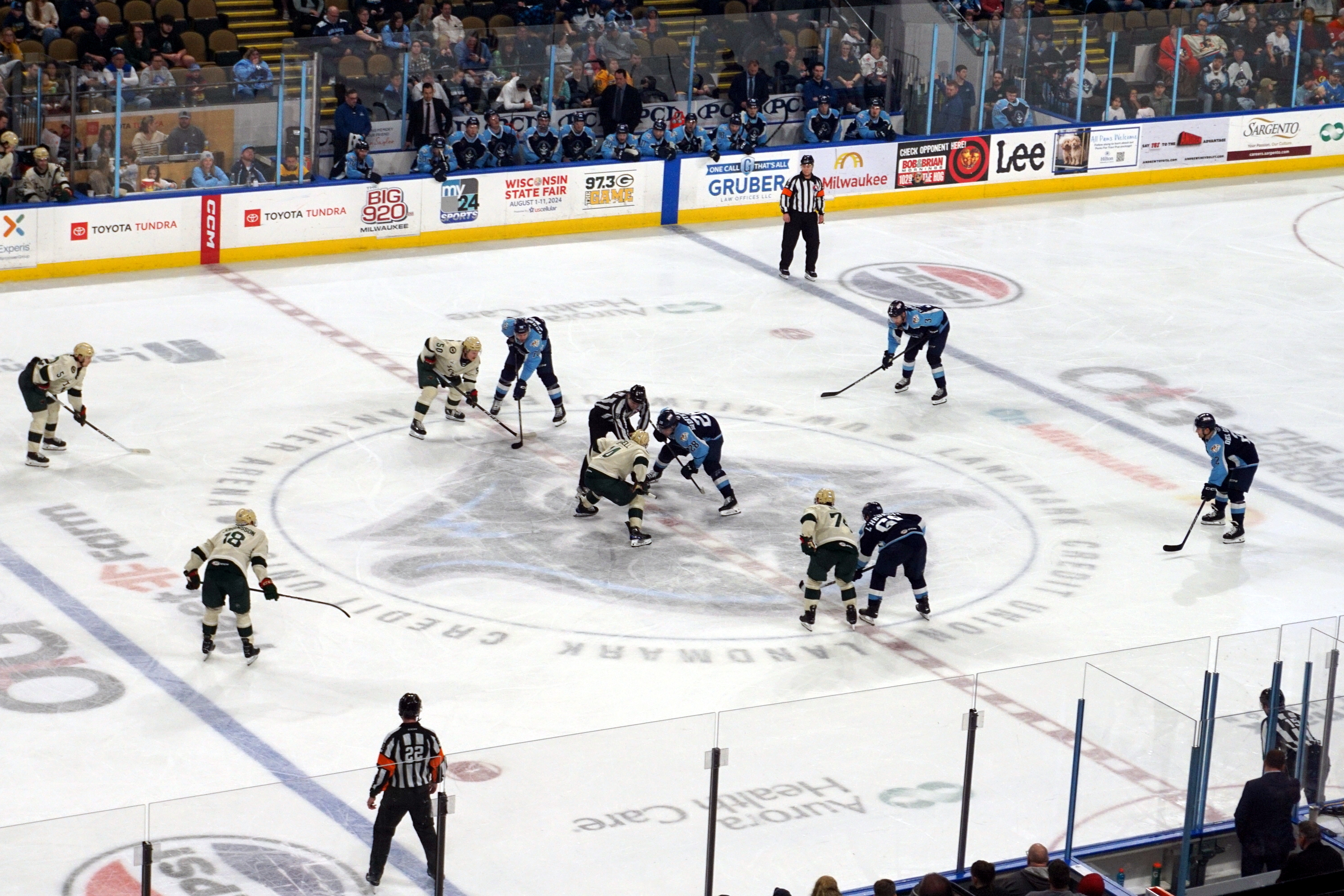
The Wild playing against the Milwaukee Admirals in 2024

On February 22, 2018, the Minnesota Wild extended their contract through 2023. In 2019, the team reached the playoffs for the first time since relocating from Houston, reaching the division finals and losing to the Chicago Wolves in six games. The following 2019–20 season was then curtailed by the onset of the COVID-19 pandemic with the Wild holding second place in the division and no playoffs were held. The 2020–21 season was then delayed due to the pandemic, with a shortened season held and no Calder Cup playoffs.

== Season-by-season results ==
| Regular season | | | | | | | | | | | Playoffs | | | | | | Average attendance |
| Season | Games | Won | Lost | OTL | SOL | Points | PCT | Goals for | Goals against | Standing | Year | Prelims | 1st round | 2nd round | 3rd round | Finals | Average attendance |
|---|---|---|---|---|---|---|---|---|---|---|---|---|---|---|---|---|---|
| 2013–14 | 76 | 27 | 36 | 7 | 6 | 67 | .441 | 169 | 235 | 5th, Midwest | 2014 | Did not qualify | | | | | 5,883 |
| 2014–15 | 76 | 23 | 49 | 2 | 2 | 50 | .329 | 172 | 245 | 5th, Midwest | 2015 | Did not qualify | | | | | 5,659 |
| 2015–16 | 76 | 24 | 41 | 5 | 6 | 59 | .388 | 169 | 225 | 8th, Central | 2016 | Did not qualify | | | | | 5,846 |
| 2016–17 | 76 | 36 | 31 | 7 | 2 | 81 | .533 | 182 | 196 | 6th, Central | 2017 | Did not qualify | | | | | 6,019 |
| 2017–18 | 76 | 33 | 27 | 10 | 6 | 82 | .539 | 232 | 246 | 5th, Central | 2018 | Did not qualify | | | | | 6,153 |
| 2018–19 | 76 | 37 | 26 | 8 | 5 | 87 | .572 | 242 | 230 | 3rd, Central | 2019 | — | W, 3–2, MIL | L, 2–4, CHI | — | — | 6,409 |
| 2019–20 | 63 | 37 | 18 | 4 | 4 | 82 | .651 | 194 | 171 | 2nd, Central | 2020 | Season cancelled due to the COVID-19 pandemic | | | | | 6,351 |
| 2020–21 | 34 | 17 | 13 | 4 | 0 | 38 | .559 | 107 | 113 | 4th, Central | 2021 | No playoffs were held | | | | | 3,273 (Note: Reduced capacity during the COVID-19 pandemic.) |
| 2021–22 | 72 | 32 | 31 | 4 | 5 | 73 | .507 | 202 | 209 | 6th, Central | 2022 | Did not qualify | | | | | 5,435 |
| 2022–23 | 72 | 34 | 27 | 6 | 5 | 79 | .549 | 211 | 211 | 4th, Central | 2023 | L, 0–2 RFD | — | — | — | — | 6,296 |
| 2023–24 | 72 | 27 | 37 | 4 | 4 | 62 | .431 | 184 | 245 | 6th, Central | 2024 | Did not qualify | | | | | 6,401 |
| 2024–25 | 72 | 27 | 37 | 6 | 2 | 62 | .431 | 201 | 251 | 6th, Central | 2025 | Did not qualify | | | | | 6,237 |
| 2025–26 | 72 | 27 | 36 | 6 | 3 | 63 | .438 | 179 | 226 | 6th, Central | 2026 | Did not qualify | | | | | 6,154 |

== Players ==
=== Current roster ===
Updated November 10, 2026.

| No. | Nat | Player | Pos | S/G | Age | Acquired | Birthplace | Contract |
|---|---|---|---|---|---|---|---|---|
| 19 | (Canada) | Caedan Bankier | C | L | 23 | 2023 | White Rock, British Columbia | Minnesota |
| 24 | (United States) | Blake Biondi | C | R | 24 | 2026 | Hermantown, Minnesota | Iowa |
| 4 | (United States) | Ben Dexheimer | D | R | 24 | 2026 | Edina, Minnesota | Minnesota |
| 14 | (United States) | Dylan Gambrell (A) | C | R | 30 | 2025 | Bonney Lake, Washington | Minnesota |
| 6 | (United States) | Viking Gustafsson Nyberg | D | L | 23 | 2026 | Stockholm, Sweden | Minnesota |
| 37 | (Canada) | Hunter Haight | C | R | 22 | 2024 | Strathroy, Ontario | Minnesota |
| 27 | (Canada) | Riley Heidt | C | L | 21 | 2025 | Saskatoon, Saskatchewan | Minnesota |
| 8 | (United States) | Jagger Joshua | LW | L | 27 | 2026 | Dearborn, Michigan | Minnesota |
| 34 | (United States) | Arthur Kaliyev (PTO) | LW | L | 25 | 2026 | Tashkent, Uzbekistan | Iowa |
| 23 | (Canada) | Justin Kirkland | C | L | 30 | 2026 | Winnipeg, Manitoba | Minnesota |
| 2 | (United States) | Mike Koster | D | L | 25 | 2025 | Chaska, Minnesota | Iowa |
| 7 | (Canada) | Carson Lambos | D | L | 23 | 2023 | Winnipeg, Manitoba | Minnesota |
| 44 | (Canada) | Stevie Leskovar | D | L | 22 | 2025 | Cambridge, Ontario | Minnesota |
| 77 | (Canada) | Rieger Lorenz | LW | L | 22 | 2026 | Calgary, Alberta | Minnesota |
| 10 | (United States) | Brad Marek | C | L | 26 | 2024 | Big Rapids, Michigan | Iowa |
| 20 | (United States) | Gerry Mayhew (A) | RW | R | 33 | 2025 | Wyandotte, Michigan | Iowa |
| 67 | (Canada) | Riley Mercer | G | L | 22 | 2025 | Bay Roberts, Newfoundland | Minnesota |
| 9 | (United States) | Jack Peart | D | L | 23 | 2024 | Grand Rapids, Minnesota | Minnesota |
| 17 | (United States) | Tyler Pitlick (A) | C | R | 35 | 2025 | Minneapolis, Minnesota | Minnesota |
| 25 | (Canada) | Nick Rhéaume | LW | L | 24 | 2026 | Sherbrooke, Quebec | Iowa |
| 35 | (Canada) | William Rousseau | G | L | 23 | 2025 | Trois-Rivières, Quebec | Iowa |
| 76 | (United States) | Roman Schmidt | D | R | 23 | 2026 | Midland, Michigan | Minnesota |
| 18 | (Canada) | Mason Shaw (C) | C | L | 28 | 2026 | Lloydminster, Alberta | Minnesota |
| 28 | (United States) | Braidan Simmons-Fischer | D | R | 24 | 2026 | Commerce Township, Michigan | Iowa |
| 15 | (United States) | Charlie Stramel | C | R | 22 | 2026 | Rosemount, Minnesota | Minnesota |
| 5 | (Canada) | Reilly Webb | D | R | 27 | 2026 | Stoney Creek, Ontario | Iowa |

=== Team captains ===
- Jake Dowell, 2013–14
- Stephane Veilleux, 2014–15
- Maxime Fortunus, 2015–16
- Mike Weber, 2016–17
- Cal O'Reilly, 2017–19
- Cody McLeod, 2021–22
- Mason Shaw, 2022, 2026–present
- Dakota Mermis, 2022–24
- Cameron Crotty, 2024–25
- Ben Jones, 2025–26

== Franchise records and leaders ==
=== Scoring leaders ===
These are the top-ten point-scorers for the Iowa Wild in the AHL. Figures are updated after each completed season.

Note: Pos = Position; GP = Games played; G = Goals; A = Assists; Pts = Points; P/G = Points per game; = current Iowa player

Points
| Player | Pos | GP | G | A | Pts | P/G |
|---|---|---|---|---|---|---|
| Gerald Mayhew | RW | 288 | 119 | 101 | 220 | .76 |
| Kyle Rau | C | 244 | 88 | 111 | 199 | .81 |
| Sam Anas | C | 259 | 72 | 125 | 197 | .76 |
| Zack Mitchell | RW | 250 | 66 | 66 | 132 | .53 |
| Cal O'Reilly | C | 142 | 31 | 100 | 131 | .92 |
| Mason Shaw | C | 197 | 43 | 78 | 121 | .61 |
| Brennan Menell | D | 199 | 15 | 101 | 116 | .58 |
| Adam Beckman | LW | 181 | 57 | 51 | 108 | .60 |
| Marco Rossi | C | 116 | 34 | 70 | 104 | .90 |
| Colton Beck | LW | 319 | 41 | 63 | 104 | .33 |
