= Carleton Ravens women's ice hockey =

Carleton Ravens women's ice hockey program

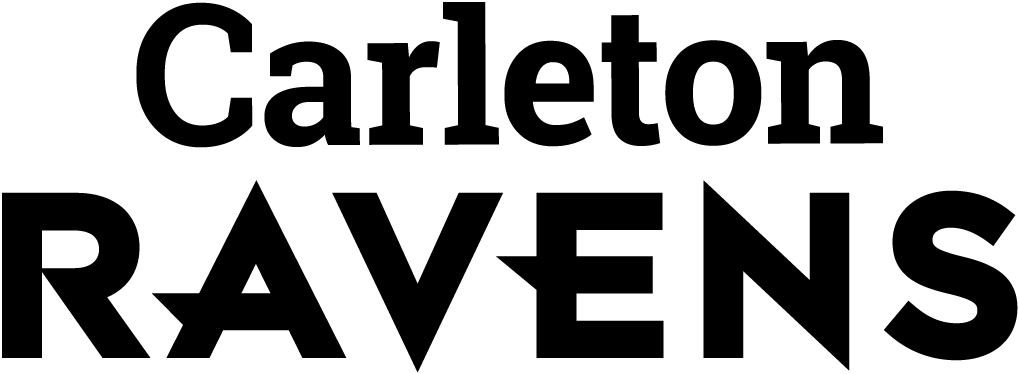
- University: Carleton University
- Conference: OUA; East Division
- Governing Body: U Sports
- Head coach: Stacey Colarossi; 4th season
- Assistant coaches: Bill Courchaine, Rob Heholt, Jessica Robichaud, Celine Tardif
- Arena: Carleton Ice House; Ottawa
- Colors: Black and Red
- Mascot: Rodney the Raven

The Carleton Ravens are a collegiate women's ice hockey team based out of Ottawa, Ontario, Canada. Competing as the women's ice hockey team of Carleton University, the Ravens currently play in the Ontario University Athletics (OUA) Conference and formerly played in the Quebec Student Sports Federation (RSEQ), as part of the Canadian Interuniversity Sport women's ice hockey championship. The team plays its home games at the Carleton Ice House, typically on Saturday and Sunday afternoons.

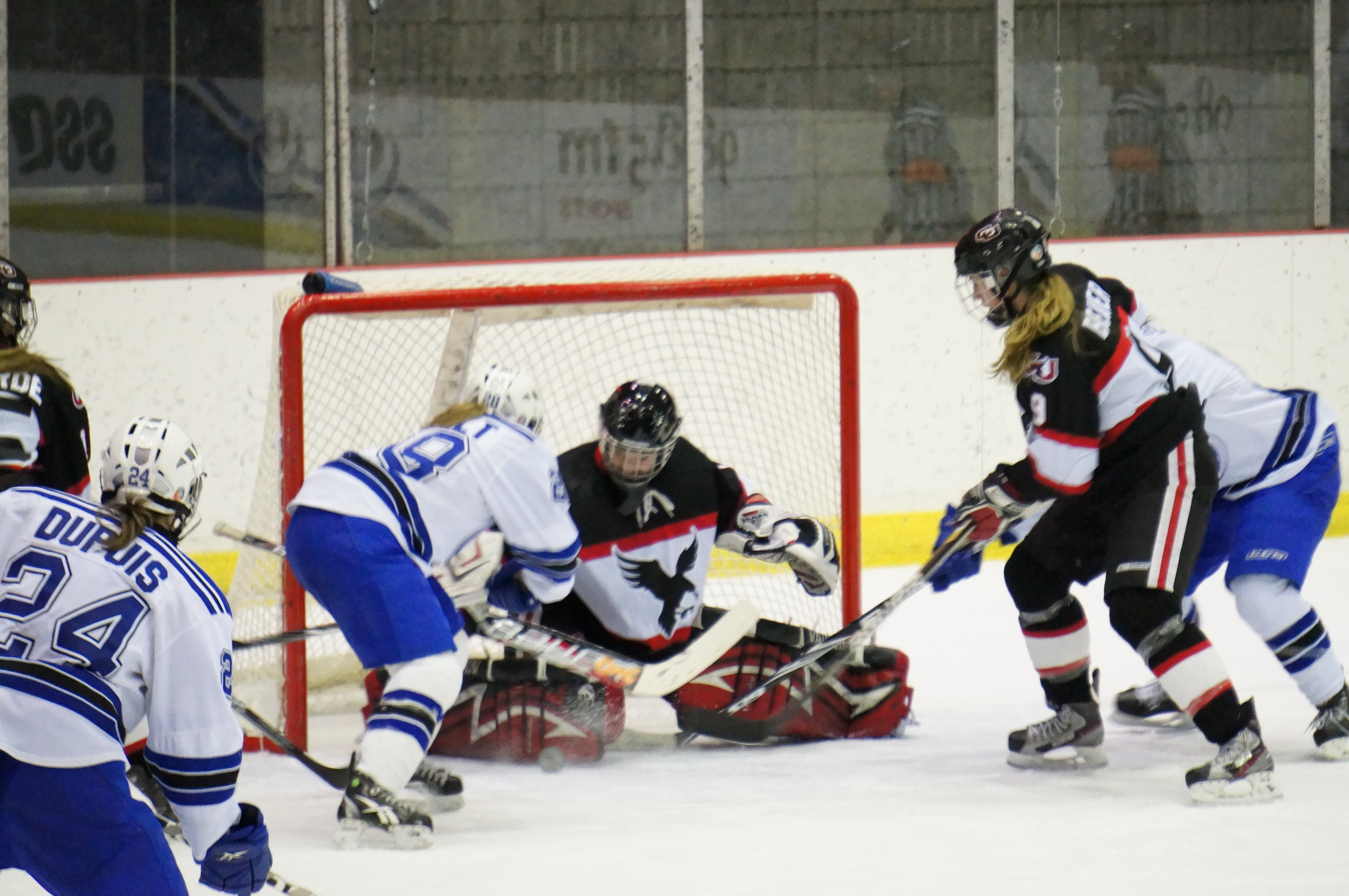

== History ==
During the 2006–07 regular season, Valerie Charbonneau earned her second straight nod to the RSEQ All-Star Team. Recording 540 saves, she would break the previous single season record of 532, which she set one season earlier. On February 28, 2007, she would log an astounding 53 saves in a 5–4 double overtime victory versus the Ottawa Gee-Gees, resulting in the program's first-ever playoff victory.

Earning the 2011 Carleton University Most Outstanding Graduating Female Athlete Award, Kristen Marson would play 91 games, setting a program record. In addition, she would graduate as the Ravens all-time leader in career assists with 21.

In a January 22, 2012 game against the No. 1-ranked McGill Martlets, the Ravens defeated McGill for the first time in program history via a 4–3 shootout victory. McGill had won 116 of its previous 117 games entering the upset.

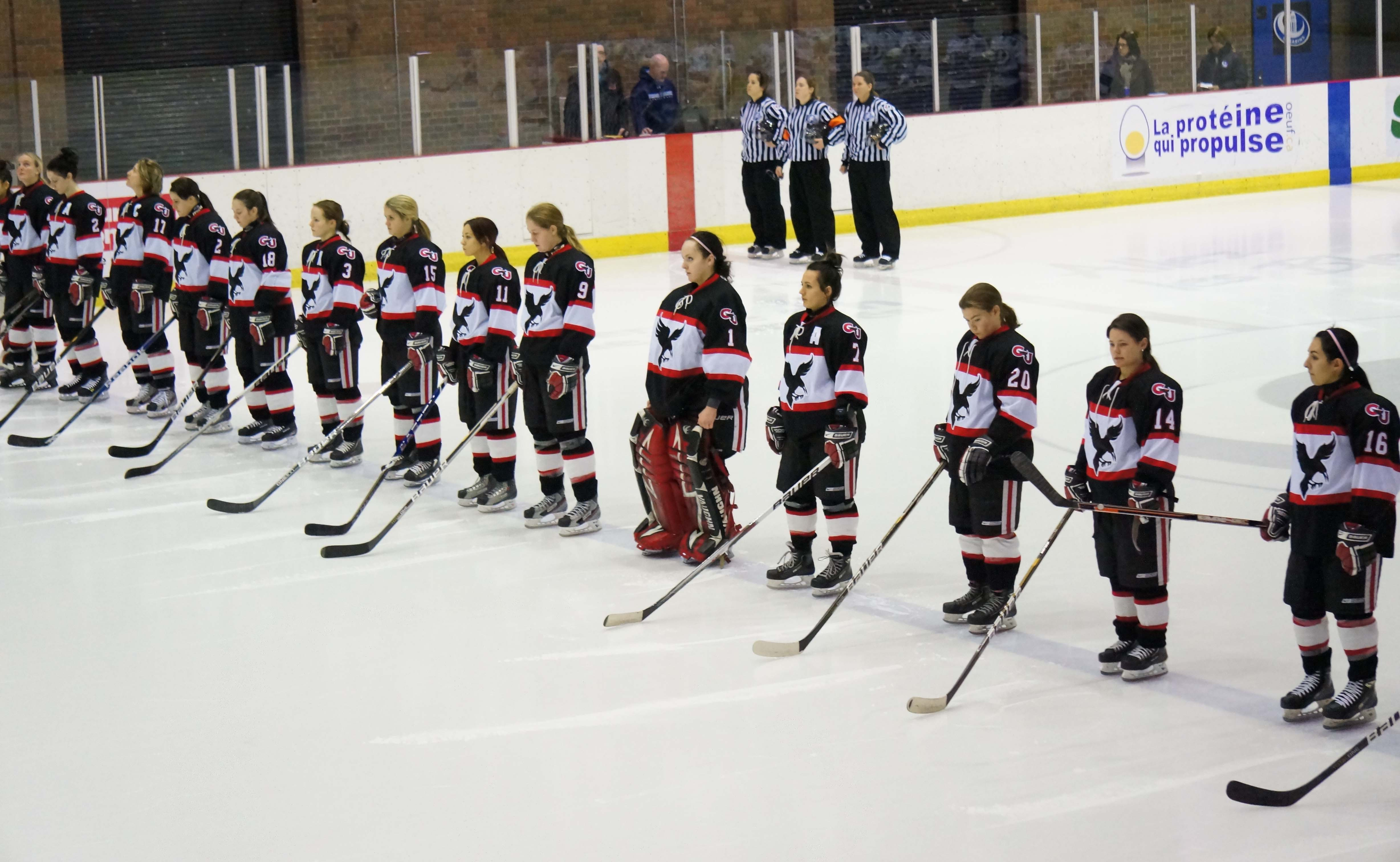

On February 4, 2012, the Ravens honoured the memory of the late Daron Richardson, daughter of Ottawa Senators assistant coach, Luke Richardson. The club held a charity drive for the Daron Richardson Fund (known as Do It For Daron), a program focused on raising awareness about youth mental health. Bruce MacDonald, Daron's former coach and the father of Ravens player Kristen MacDonald participated in the ceremonial face off.

On January 20, 2013, a contest at the Carleton Ice House versus the cross-town rival Ottawa Gee-Gees resulted in a shootout. Ravens forward Jessica O'Grady would record three goals in the shootout, resulting in one of the most remarkable wins in program history.

In preparation for the 2013 IIHF Women's World Championship, the Carleton Ice House served as the training facility for the Germany women's national ice hockey team. Former Ravens team captain Sara Seiler served as a member of the German squad. Of note, the Ravens hosted Germany in an exhibition game, which saw the Germans prevail by a 3–0 tally, with goals from Julia Zorn, Franziska Busch, Andrea Lanzl.

=== Pierre Alain era ===
Longtime Hockey Canada deckhand Pierre Alain was named the new head coach of the program on May 2, 2014. The coach of multiple gold medal-winning national teams, Alain promised a full rebuild of the program from the ground up, starting with recruiting.

Alain's first season in charge, 2014–15, proved to be a difficult one, as players tried to find chemistry with a strong batch of first-year recruits. Carleton sputtered to a 3–17 record, losing its final ten games in a row to slide out of playoff contention. However, an encouraging set of freshman including goaltender Katelyn Steele, defenceman Robyn Belland, and forward Sidney Weiss leave plenty of room for future optimism around the program.

Coach Alain's program began the 2015–16 campaign with a roster composed of more than 60% freshman, along with the most first-year heavy opening night lineup in Canada. Freshman Nicole Miners would lead the team in scoring with 10 points. On the final day of the season, Miners would record three assists in a winning effort versus the Ottawa Gee-Gees. Finishing the season with 10 points, she would set a program record for most points in one season by a rookie.

The following season, Miners rookie scoring record would be broken. Delaney Ross, from Meadow Lake, Saskatchewan, amassed eight goals and 10 assists for an 18 point campaign. Not only did she set a new Ravens standard for rookie skaters, she would establish a single-season scoring record, also becoming the first player in program history to average one point per game.

Over Ross' last four games, she recorded six points, on the strength of five assists. In addition, Ross' 18 points tied her with Concordia's Audrey Belzile for the second highest scoring total in U Sports play among rookies, trailing national leader Annie Berg of the Brock Badgers by five points. Earning a spot on the 2016–17 U Sports All-Rookie Team, she became only the second player in program history to receive national recognition. Coincidentally, the other Ravens player to receive national honours also landed on the All-Rookie Team, Kerri Palmer from 2007–08.

During August 2020, former Ravens player and current assistant coach Tawnya Guindon was one of 18 former U Sports student-athletes announced among the inaugural participants of the U SPORTS Female Apprenticeship Coach Program. Funded through Sport Canada, the objective was to increase the number of females in coaching positions across Canadian universities, matching apprentice coaches who have recently graduated with a mentor coach.

As the 2020–21 season was shelved due to the Covid-19 Pandemic, the charitable efforts of first-year recruit Emma Weller made national news. Handing out wool hats and mittens, that she sewed herself, to homeless communities around the nation's capital, it caught the attention of The Sports Network, who dispatched a production team to produce a feature of her efforts ahead of Bell Let’s Talk Day.

=== Move to OUA ===
In February 2023, it was announced that the Ravens would move to the OUA ahead of the 2024-25 season. During their time in the RSEQ, the Ravens compiled a won-loss mark of 92-300-31. Over 22 seasons, the Ravens finished in last place 12 times.

Based in the OUA East Division, their first season resulted in a last place finish. Winning only six out of 26 games, their first OUA regular season game occurred on October 11, 2024 versus the Brock Badgers. The Ravens prevailed in a 5-2 final as Payton Miller scored twice, while Justina Beard, Nicole Hunter and Hayden Serniuk, who recorded the Ravens first goal of the game, all logged goals.

=== Season-by-season Record ===
Won championship	Lost championship	Conference champions	League leader

Year	Coach	W	L	T	OTL	GF	GA	Pts	Finish
2004–05	Marco Ouellette	0	14	1	0	12	83	1	4th, QSSF
2005–06	Marco Ouellette	0	14	0	1	13	61	1	4th, QSSF
2006–07	Marco Ouellette	5	13	0	0	26	63	10	3rd, QSSF
2007–08	Marco Ouellette	7	11	0	0	27	57	14	3rd, QSSF
2008–09	Marco Ouellette	7	11	–	0	31	61	14	3rd, QSSF
2009–10	J.F. Messier	8	12	–	0	39	47	16	4th, RSEQ
2010–11	Shelley Coolidge	7	8	–	5	46	59	19	4th, RSEQ
2011–12	Shelley Coolidge	9	8	–	3	53	75	21	3rd, RSEQ
2012–13	Shelley Coolidge	7	12	–	1	46	85	15	4th, RSEQ
2013–14	Shelley Coolidge	1	15	4	1	32	90	6	5th, RSEQ
2014–15	Pierre Alain	3	17	–	0	24	96	6	5th, RSEQ
2015–16	Pierre Alain	5	15	–	0	23	65	10	5th, RSEQ
2016–17	Pierre Alain	4	16	–	0	39	71	10	5th, RSEQ
2017–18	Pierre Alain	1	15	–	2	25	60	8	5th, RSEQ
2018–19	Pierre Alain	2	15	–	3	30	77	8	5th, RSEQ
2019–20	Pierre Alain	2	14	–	2	29	66	10	5th, RSEQ
2020–21	Cancelled due to the COVID-19 pandemic								
2021–22	Pierre Alain	4	11	–	–	20	61	8	5th, RSEQ
2022–23	Stacey Colarossi	8	17	–	–	44	78	19	5th, RSEQ
2023–24	Stacey Colarossi	8	17	–	–	39	75	17	5th, RSEQ
2024-25	Stacey Colarossi	6	20	–	–	48	86	21	7th, OUA East
2025-26	Stacey Colarossi	8	18	–	–	44	72	23	6th, OUA East

=== Exhibition ===
Date	Opponent^{#}	Rank^{#}	Site	Decision	Result	Record
Exhibition
September 3, 2010	vs. Team Norway		Carleton Ice House • Ottawa, ON	Victoria Powers, W	W W 2–1	
February 11, 2013	vs. Team Germany		Carleton Ice House • Ottawa, ON	Tamber Tisdale, L	L 0–3	
October 14, 2016	at Cornell Big Red		Lynah Rink • Ithaca, NY	Katelyn Steele, L	L 0–10	
*Non-conference game. ^{#}Rankings from USCHO.com Poll.

=== Season team scoring champion ===
Year	Player	GP	G	A	PTS	PIM
2025-26	Hayden Serniuk	26	7	6	13	10
2024-25	Olwen Jones	26	5	7	12	8
2023-24	Cecilia Lopez	22	7	5	12	10
2022-23	Nicole Hunter	24	6	5	11	8
2021-22	Nicole MacNeil	13	1	5	6	8
2020–21	Cancelled due to the COVID-19 pandemic					
2019–20	Annie-Pier Tremblay	19	2	6	8	6
2018–19	Annie-Pier Tremblay	20	4	10	14	6
2017–18	Shannon Pearson	20	6	3	9	16
2016–17	Delaney Ross	18	8	10	18	4
2015–16	Nicole Miners	20	3	7	10	26
2014–15	Tawnya Guindon	20	4	5	9	20
2013–14	Sadie Wegner	20	8	5	13	16
2012–13	Sadie Wegner	19	10	7	17	33
2011–12	Sara Seiler	20	4	11	15	4
2010–11	Claudia Bergeron	20	6	11	17	4
2009–10	Claudia Bergeron	20	7	6	13	14

=== Team captains ===
This is an incomplete list

Sara Seiler was the first European in the history of the program to have the captaincy bestowed upon her.

- 2002–03: Tricia Zakaria
- 2003–04: Tricia Zakaria
- 2008–09: Tara O'Reilly
- 2009–10: Tara O'Reilly
- 2010–11: Sara Seiler
- 2011–12: Sara Seiler
- 2012–13: Blaire MacDonald
- 2013–14:
- 2014–15: Sadie Wegner
- 2015–16: Tawnya Guindon
- 2016–17: Tawnya Guindon
- 2017–18: Leah Scott
- 2018–19: Leah Scott
- 2019–20: Leah Scott
- 2020–21: No season held
- 2024–25: Justina Beard C, Avery Krawchuk A, Lane Guimond A, Hayden Serniuk A
- 2025–26: Avery Krawchuk C, Lane Guimond A, Hayden Serniuk A, Olwen Jones A, Payton Miller A

== Awards and honours ==
=== USports ===
- Delaney Ross, 2017 USports All-Rookie Team

=== RSEQ ===
- Erica Skinner, 2010–11 RSEQ Leadership and Citizenship Award (Nomination for the Marion Hilliard Award – presented annually to the CIS women's hockey player who best combines academic and sport excellence with community involvement)
- Kristen MacDonald, 2011–12 RSEQ Leadership and Citizenship Award (Nomination for the Marion Hilliard Award – presented annually to the CIS women's hockey player who best combines academic and sport excellence with community involvement)

==== RSEQ All-Stars ====
First-Team

- Kerri Palmer, 2008 RSEQ First Team All-Star

Second-Team

- Caitlin Whitehead: 2023–24 RSEQ Second Team All-Star
- Valerie Charbonneau: 2005–06 RSEQ Second Team All-Star
- Valerie Charbonneau: 2006–07 RSEQ Second Team All-Star
- Kristen Marson: 2006–07 RSEQ Second Team All-Star
- Kristen Marson, 2011 RSEQ Second All-Star Team
- 2011–12 RSEQ SECOND ALL-STAR TEAM: Melanie McKnight
- 2011–12 RSEQ SECOND ALL-STAR TEAM: Tamber Tisdale
- 2016–17 RSEQ Second Team All-Stars: Katelyn Steele, Carleton

==== RSEQ All-Rookie ====
- Robyn Belland, 2014–15 RSEQ All-Rookie Team
- 2016–17 RSEQ All-Rookie Team: Delaney Ross
- 2019–20 RSEQ ALL-ROOKIE TEAM: Nicole MacNeil, Carleton

==== Conference weekly awards ====
- Katelyn Steele, RSEQ Female Athlete of the Week (Awarded January 10, 2017)

=== Team Awards ===
This is an incomplete list

==== Most Valuable Player ====
- 2005–06: Valerie Charbonneau
- 2006–07: Caitlin Cadeau
- 2007–08: Kristen Marson
- 2008–09: Valerie Charbonneau
- 2011–12: Claudia Bergeron
- 2012–13: Blaire MacDonald
- 2013–14: Eri Kiribuchi, Goaltender
- 2014–15: Tawnya Guindon
- 2015–16: Katelyn Steele
- 2016–17: Katelyn Steele
- 2019–20: Jennifer Semkowski

==== Alumni Award ====
- 2005–06: Meryl Ditchburn
- 2006–07: Michelle Higgins
- 2007–08: Jessica Bradley
- 2013–14: Jasmine Levesque
- 2014–15: Ainslee Kent
- 2015–16: Tawnya Guindon
- 2016–17: Tawnya Guindon
- 2019–20: Jennifer Semkowski

=== University Awards ===
- Kristen Marson: 2011 Carleton University Most Outstanding Graduating Female Athlete

=== Ravens Athlete of the Week ===
- Kristen Marson: Carleton University’s Athlete of the Week (Week of January 18, 2011)

== Ravens in professional hockey ==
= CWHL All-Star	= NWHL All-Star	= Clarkson Cup Champion	= Isobel Cup Champion

Player	Position	Team(s)	League(s)	Years	Titles
Erin Beaver	Defence/Forward	Neuberg Highlanders; Sydney Sirens	EWHL; AWIHL	4	Joan McKowen Memorial Trophy AWIHL Champion
Audrey-Ann Boutour	Forward	Neuberg Highlanders	EWHL	1	
Hedda Gjerde	Defence	MODO; Vålerenga	SDHL; Norway		
Tawnya Guindon	Forward	Göteborg HC; Leksands IF	SDHL	2	
Olivia Keefe	Defence	Boston Blades	CWHL	1	
Eri Kiribuchi	Goaltender	HC 2001 Kladno; KJT; Hachinohe Reds	Czech; SM-sarja; Japan		
Kristen Marson	Defence	Burlington Barracudas; Toronto Furies	CWHL	3	2014 Clarkson Cup
Jess O'Grady	Forward	Ottawa Lady Senators; Calgary Inferno; Toronto Furies	CWHL		
Delaney Ross	Forward	Naprzod Janow	Poland	1	
Sara Seiler	Forward	Ottawa Raiders; ERC Ingolstadt	NWHL founded in 1999; Frauen-Bundesliga (W)	1	
Olivia Sutter	Forward	Team Alberta	CWHL		
Tamber Tisdale	Goaltender	OSC Eisladies Berlin	Frauen-Bundesliga (W)	1	
Alexandra Cipparone (Palm)	Forward	Segeltorps IF / Djugårdens IF	SDHL	7	

=== International ===
- Alexandra Lehman Switzerland: 2022 IIHF Women's World Championship and 2024 IIHF Women's World Championship
- Hedda Gjerde Norway: 2013 IIHF Women's World Championship Division I
- Eri Kiribuchi Japan: 2009 Winter Universiade
- Andrea Kollova Slovakia: 2016 IIHF World Women's U18 Championship – Division I
- Sara Seiler Germany: 2013 IIHF Women's World Championship and Ice hockey at the 2014 Winter Olympics – Women's tournament
