= United States men's junior national softball team =

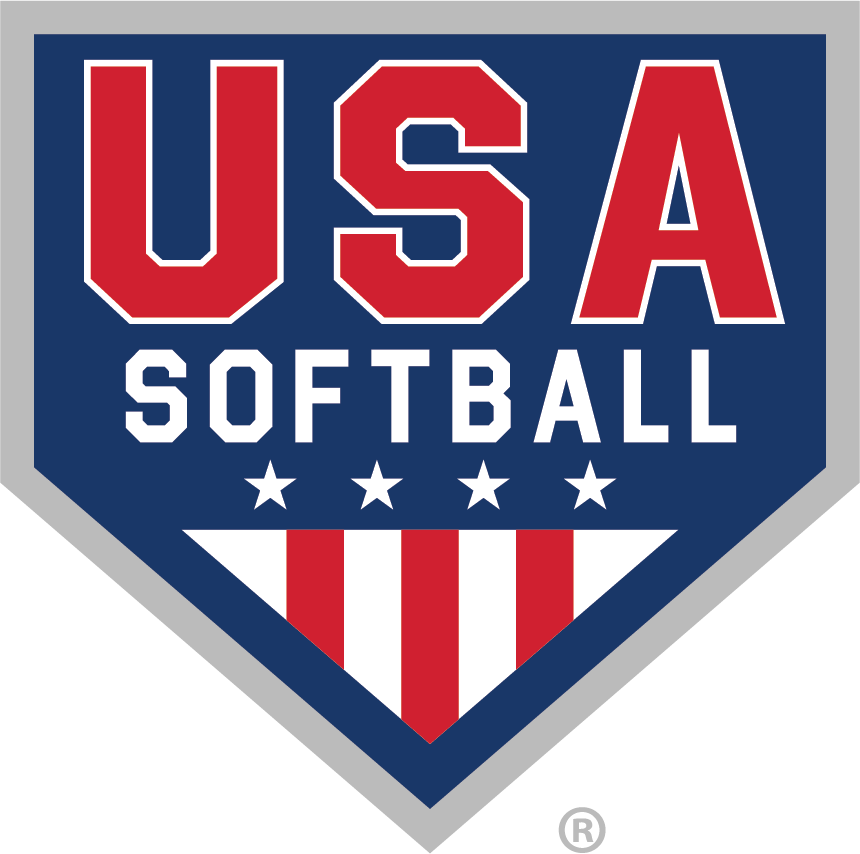

Information
- Country: United States
- Federation: USA Softball
- Confederation: WBSC Americas

United States men's junior national softball team
Medal record

U-18 World Cup
Silver medal – second place	1981 Edmonton	
Silver medal – second place	1985 Fargo	

U-18 Pan American Championship
Gold medal – first place	2023 Colombia	

United States men's junior national softball team is the junior national under-18 team for United States. The team competed at the 1985 ISF Junior Men's World Championship in Fargo, North Dakota where they finished second. The team competed at the 1989 ISF Junior Men's World Championship in Summerside, Prince Edward Island where they finished fourth. The team competed at the 1993 ISF Junior Men's World Championship in Auckland, New Zealand where they finished fifth. The team competed at the 1997 ISF Junior Men's World Championship in St. John's, Newfoundland where they finished ninth. The team competed at the 2001 ISF Junior Men's World Championship in Sydney, Australia where they finished ninth. The team competed at the 2005 ISF Junior Men's World Championship in Summerside, Prince Edward Island where they finished fifth. The team competed at the 2008 ISF Junior Men's World Championship in Whitehorse, Yukon where they finished eighth. The team competed at the 2012 ISF Junior Men's World Championship in Parana, Argentina, where they finished fifth.

The team also won champion in U-18 Pan American Men's Softball Championship, the inaugural event was held in 2023.

== Competitive record ==
=== U-18 World Cup ===
Year	Result	Position	Pld	W	L	%	RS	RA
(Canada) 1981	Runners-up	2nd						
(United States) 1985	Runners-up	2nd						
(Canada) 1989	Fourth Place	4th						
(New Zealand) 1993	Fifth Place	5th						
(Canada) 1997	Preliminary round	9th						
(Australia) 2001	Preliminary round	9th						
(Canada) 2005	Fifth Place	5th						
(Canada) 2008	Quarterfinals	8th						
(Argentina) 2012	Fifth Place	5th						
(Canada) 2014	Fifth Place	5th						
(United States) 2016	Fifth Place	5th						
(Canada) 2018	Quarterfinals	8th						
(New Zealand) 2020	Preliminary round	10th						
(Mexico) 2023	Fourth Place	4th						
Total	0 title	14/14						

=== U-18 Pan American Championship ===
Year	Result	Position	Pld	W	L	%	RS	RA
(Colombia) 2023	Champions	1st	6	5	1	.833	45	9
Total	1 title	1/1	6	5	1	.833	45	9
