= Denmark men's junior national softball team =

Denmark men's junior national softball team is the junior national under-17 team for Denmark. The team competed at the 2005 ISF Junior Men's World Championship in Summerside, Prince Edward Island where they finished ninth. The team competed at the 2008 ISF Junior Men's World Championship in Whitehorse, Yukon where they finished tenth. The team competed at the 2012 ISF Junior Men's World Championship in Parana, Argentina where they finished eighth. The team competed at the 2014 ISF Jr. Mens World Championships in Whitehorse, Yukon where it finished 9th. The team competed in the 2016 ISF Jr. Men's Championships in Midland, Michigan where it finished 11th. The team competed at the 2018 WBSC Jr. Men's World Championships in Prince Albert, Saskatchewan where it finished 13th.
