= U-18 Men's Softball World Cup =

- Current season, competition or edition: 2023 U-18 Men's Softball World Cup
- Sport: Softball
- No. of teams: 12 (finals)
- Continent: International
- Most recent champion: Japan (4th title)
- Most titles: Australia (5 titles)

The U-18 Men's Softball World Cup (in spanish: Campeonato Mundial juvenil de softball masculino) is a fastpitch softball tournament for age 19-and-under national teams held every four years by the World Baseball Softball Confederation, formerly the International Softball Federation (ISF).

== Classification ==
With the approved format of 12 national teams, the WBSC has distributed the continental quotas as follows:

- WBSC Africa: 1 spots
- WBSC Americas: 4 spots
- WBSC Asia: 2 spots
- WBSC Europe: 2 spots
- WBSC Oceania: 2 spots
- Wild cards: 1 spots (including hosts if necessary)

The participants will be determined through the continental championships.

== Results ==
Ed.	Years	Final hosts	Finalists			Semi-finalists			Teams
Ed.	Years	Final hosts	Champions	Score	Runners-up	3rd place	Score	4th place	Teams
Jr. Men's Softball World Championship
1	1981; Details	(Canada); Edmonton	Japan	2 – 0	United States	Mexico		Canada	5
2	1985; Details	(United States); Fargo	New Zealand	2 – 1	United States	Canada		Japan	8
3	1989; Details	(Canada); Summerside	New Zealand	–	Canada	Japan		United States	7
4	1993; Details	(New Zealand); Auckland	Canada	4 – 3	New Zealand	Japan		Australia	7
5	1997; Details	(Canada); St. John's	Australia	6 – 1	New Zealand	Canada		Argentina	11
6	2001; Details	(Australia); Blacktown	Australia	8 – 0	Japan	Canada		New Zealand	10
7	2005; Details	(Canada); Summerside	Australia	7 – 2	Japan	Canada		New Zealand	9
8	2008; Details	(Canada); Whitehorse	Australia	2 – 1	Canada	Japan		New Zealand	12
9	2012; Details	(Argentina); Parana	Argentina	5 – 0	Japan	Australia		Canada	13
10	2014; Details	(Canada); Whitehorse	Argentina	9 – 0	New Zealand	Japan		Australia	10
11	2016; Details	(United States); Midland	Japan	2 – 1	New Zealand	Canada		Argentina	12
12	2018; Details	(Canada); Prince Albert	Australia	6 – 1	Japan	New Zealand	—N/a	Canada	13
U-18 Men's Softball World Cup
13	2020; Details	(New Zealand); Palmerston North	Japan	9 – 2	Australia	Czech Republic	2 – 0	Argentina	12
14	2023; Details	(Mexico); Hermosillo	Japan	8 – 4	Mexico	Canada	2 – 1	United States	11
15	2027; Details	(Czech Republic); Havlickuv Brod / Ledenice							12

== Medal table ==
Rank	Nation	Gold	Silver	Bronze	Total
1	Australia	5	1	1	7
2	Japan	4	4	4	12
3	New Zealand	2	4	1	7
4	Argentina	2	0	0	2
5	Canada	1	2	6	9
6	United States	0	2	0	2
7	Mexico	0	1	1	2
8	Czech Republic	0	0	1	1
Totals (8 entries)		14	14	14	42

== Participating nations ==
- 1st — Champion
- 2nd — Runner-up
- 3rd — Third place
- — Host nation

Nation	1981	1985	1989	1993	1997	2001	2005	2008	2012	2014	2016	2018	2020	2023	2027	Years
Anguilla	—	—	—	—	11th	—	—	—	—	—	—	—	—	—	—	1
Argentina	5th	8th	—	7th	4th	5th	7th	7th	1st	1st	4th	5th	4th	8th		13
Australia	—	—	—	4th	1st	1st	1st	1st	3rd	4th	6th	1st	2nd	5th		11
Bahamas	—	7th	—	—	—	—	—	—	—	—	—	—	—	—	—	1
Botswana	—	—	—	—	—	—	—	12th	—	—	9th	—	—	—	—	2
Canada	4th	3rd	2nd	1st	3rd	3rd	3rd	2nd	4th	7th	3rd	4th	7th	3rd		14
Colombia	—	—	—	—	—	—	—	—	—	—	—	—	—	10th	—	1
Croatia	—	—	—	—	—	—	—	—	13th	—	—	—	—	—	—	1
Czech Republic	—	—	—	—	10th	8th	8th	11th	10th	8th	7th	7th	3rd	7th		10
Denmark	—	—	—	—	—	—	9th	10th	8th	9th	1th	13th	12th	—	—	7
Guatemala	—	—	—	—	—	—	—	—	—	—	—	11th	6th	—	—	2
Hong Kong	—	—	—	—	—	—	—	—	—	—	—	12th	—	—		1
India	—	—	—	—	—	—	—	—	11th	—	—	9th	—	—		2
Israel	—	—	—	—	—	10th	—	—	—	—	12th	—	—	—	—	2
Japan	1st	4th	3rd	3rd	5th	2nd	2nd	3rd	2nd	3rd	1st	2nd	1st	1st		14
Lithuania	—	—	—	—	—	—	—	—	—	—	—	—	—	—		1
Mexico	3rd	5th	5th	—	7th	7th	6th	6th	7th	6th	8th	6th	8th	2nd		13
New Zealand	—	1st	1st	2nd	2nd	4th	4th	4th	6th	2nd	2nd	3rd	5th	9th		13
Philippines	—	—	7th	6th	—	—	—	—	—	—	—	—	—	—	—	2
South Africa	—	—	—	—	6th	—	—	9th	—	—	10th	10th	11th	—		5
Singapore	—	—	—	—	—	—	—	—	12th	10th	—	—	9th	11th		4
Chinese Taipei	—	6th	6th	—	—	—	—	—	—	—	—	—	—	—	—	2
United States	2nd	2nd	4th	5th	9th	9th	5th	8th	5th	5th	5th	8th	10th	4th	—	14
Venezuela	—	—	—	—	8th	6th	—	5th	9th	—	—	—	—	6th		5
Total Nations	5	8	7	7	11	10	9	12	13	10	12	13	12	11	12	

== See also ==
- U-18 Women’s Softball World Cup
