= Japan men's junior national softball team =

Japan men's junior national softball team is the junior national under-17 team for Japan. The team competed at the 1985 ISF Junior Men's World Championship in Fargo, North Dakota where they finished fourth. The team competed at the 1989 ISF Junior Men's World Championship in Summerside, Prince Edward Island where they finished third. The team competed at the 1993 ISF Junior Men's World Championship in Auckland, New Zealand where they finished third. The team competed at the 1997 ISF Junior Men's World Championship in St. John's, Newfoundland where they finished fifth. The team competed at the 2001 ISF Junior Men's World Championship in Sydney, Australia where they finished second. The team competed at the 2005 ISF Junior Men's World Championship in Summerside, Prince Edward Island where they finished second. The team competed at the 2008 ISF Junior Men's World Championship in Whitehorse, Yukon where they finished third. The team competed at the 2012 ISF Junior Men's World Championship in Parana, Argentina where they finished second.
