= Czech Republic men's junior national softball team =

Czech Republic men's junior national softball team is the junior national under-17 team for Czech Republic. The team competed at the 1997 ISF Junior Men's World Championship in St. John's, Newfoundland where they finished tenth. The team competed at the 2001 ISF Junior Men's World Championship in Sydney, Australia where they finished eighth. The team competed at the 2005 ISF Junior Men's World Championship in Summerside, Prince Edward Island where they finished eighth. The team competed at the 2008 ISF Junior Men's World Championship in Whitehorse, Yukon where they finished eleventh. The team competed at the 2012 ISF Junior Men's World Championship in Paraná, Argentina where they finished tenth.
