= Italy at the 2026 World Skate Games =

- Flag of Italy
- IOC code: ITA
- NOC: FISR

in Asunción, Paraguay 2–18 October 2026
- Competitors: 540 in 11 sports
- Flag bearers: Duccio Marsili, Matilde Arosio
- Medals Ranked 1st: Gold 24 Silver 28 Bronze 24 Total 76

Italy competed at the 2026 World Skate Games in Asunción, Paraguay, from 2 to 18 October 2026.

The Italian delegation topped the overall medal table for the second consecutive edition following their home triumph in 2024 World Skate Games, winning a total of 76 medals (24 gold, 28 silver, and 24 bronze) ahead of Colombia. The team featured 540 athletes competing across all 11 sports on the event program.

Highlights of the Italian campaign included world titles in artistic skating, track and road speed skating, inline freestyle, skate cross, inline slalom, and a historic gold medal for the Junior Men's national team in inline hockey. Italy also secured podium finishes in roller freestyle, scootering, downhill events, and a historic bronze in women's rink hockey—the national team's first medal in the discipline in 30 years.

== Medalists ==
Medal	Name	Sport	Event	Date
2nd place, silver medalist(s)	Daniele Vecchi	Inline downhill	Men's time trial	3 October
1st place, gold medalist(s)	Matilde Arosio; Alice Delfino; Ludovica Rimondi	Skate cross	Women's team cross	3 October
3rd place, bronze medalist(s)	Luca Borromeo; Antonio Paoletta	Skate cross	Men's team cross	3 October
1st place, gold medalist(s)	Ludovica Rimondi	Skate cross	Women's skate cross	4 October
3rd place, bronze medalist(s)	Matilde Arosio	Skate cross	Women's skate cross	4 October
3rd place, bronze medalist(s)	Antonio Paoletta	Skate cross	Junior men's skate cross	4 October
3rd place, bronze medalist(s)	Giulia Bottazzin	Skateboarding downhill	Women's time trial	4 October
2nd place, silver medalist(s)	Sabrina Vitarelli	Inline downhill	Women's knockout race	5 October
2nd place, silver medalist(s)	Manuel Moretti	Inline freestyle	Junior men's speed slalom	6 October
3rd place, bronze medalist(s)	Daniele Salzillo	Inline freestyle	Junior men's speed slalom	6 October
3rd place, bronze medalist(s)	Matilde Arosio	Inline freestyle	Senior women's speed slalom	6 October
2nd place, silver medalist(s)	Manuel Moretti; Daniele Salzillo; Sveva Romano; Matilde Arosio; Gioele Zuliani; Ilaria D'Orsi	Inline freestyle	Mixed team speed slalom	6 October
1st place, gold medalist(s)	Gianmarco Savi	Inline freestyle	Men's free jump	8 October
1st place, gold medalist(s)	Francesca Brivio	Inline freestyle	Women's free jump	8 October
1st place, gold medalist(s)	Sofia Ciacia	Artistic roller skating	Senior ladies' inline figure skating	8 October
2nd place, silver medalist(s)	Elvis Martinello	Artistic roller skating	Senior men's inline figure skating	8 October
2nd place, silver medalist(s)	Clara Barattoni	Artistic roller skating	Senior ladies' inline figure skating	8 October
2nd place, silver medalist(s)	Giorgia Panebianco	Artistic roller skating	Junior ladies' inline figure skating	8 October
3rd place, bronze medalist(s)	Lorenzo Demuru	Inline freestyle	Men's freestyle battle	9 October
Gold	Angelo Kevin Bonsu, Emanuele Corazzari, Giampaolo Bastianoni, Riccardo Gloder, Riccardo Quartuccio, Leo Lazzari, Mattia Albanti, Mattia Marchet, Mattia Guerriero, Leonardo De Angelis, Ruggero Meconi, Mattia Grandelli, Lorenzo Mariani, Emanuel Mendola	Inline hockey	Junior Men's tournament	9 October
Gold	Lorenza Cesaris	Inline slalom	Senior Women	10 October
Silver	Mattia Pe	Inline slalom	Senior Men	10 October
Bronze	David Fiorot	Inline slalom	Senior Men	10 October
Gold	Sofia Paola Chiumiento	Track speed skating	Senior Women	10 October
Bronze	Veronica Caretta, Giorgia Meneghello, Pamela Lapolla, Anna Orsato, Ludovica Rossetto, Elena Tamiozzo, Sofia Bertinato, Matilde Ghirardello, Luisa Lamacchia, Laura Rubega	Rink hockey	Senior Women's tournament	10 October
Gold	Victoria Baldo	Artistic roller skating	Junior Women Free Skating	10 October
Silver	Alessandro Costagliola	Artistic roller skating	Junior Men Free Skating	10 October
Bronze	Costanza Biondi	Artistic roller skating	Junior Women Free Skating	10 October
Silver	Stefano Marzella	Scooter	Junior Men's Street	10 October
Bronze	Mattia Pe	Inline slalom	Senior Men's Slalom	11 October
Gold	Cristian Rondi	Inline slalom	Senior Men's Combined	12 October
Gold	Lorenza Cesaris	Inline slalom	Senior Women's Combined	12 October
Silver	Mattia Pe	Inline slalom	Senior Men's Combined	12 October
Bronze	Giulia Gamba	Inline slalom	Junior Women's Combined	12 October
Gold	Roberta Sasso & Gherardo Altieri Degrassi	Artistic roller skating	Senior Couple Dance	12 October
Silver	Caterina Artoni & Raoul Allegranti	Artistic roller skating	Senior Couple Dance	12 October
Gold	Ludovica Ambrosino & Luca Buonincontro	Artistic roller skating	Junior Couple Dance	12 October
Silver	Carlotta Bruzzi & Alessandro Grossi	Artistic roller skating	Junior Couple Dance	12 October
Gold	Angelica Polli & Josè Enrico Inglese	Artistic roller skating	Senior Pairs	12 October
Silver	Micol Mills & Tommaso Cortini	Artistic roller skating	Senior Pairs	12 October
Bronze	Gloria Di Bella & Alessandro Bozzini	Artistic roller skating	Senior Pairs	12 October
Gold	Maelle Milzi & Leonardo Malloggi	Artistic roller skating	Junior Pairs	12 October
Silver	Martina Nale & Riccardo Nale	Artistic roller skating	Junior Pairs	12 October
Gold	Giorgio Ghisio Erba	Track speed skating	Junior Men's 10,000m Elimination	12 October
Silver	Daniel Niero	Track speed skating	Senior Men's 10,000m Elimination	12 October
Silver	Sofia Paola Chiumiento	Track speed skating	Junior Women's 500m + D sprint	12 October
Silver	Edoardo Abis	Track speed skating	Junior Men's 500m + D sprint	12 October
Silver	Lorenza Cesaris; Giulia Gamba; Cristian Rondi; Mattia Pe	Inline slalom	Team Giant Slalom	13 October
Silver	Elisa Negrinelli; Lorenza Cesaris; Cristian Rondi; Mattia Pe	Inline slalom	Team Slalom	13 October
Gold	Sofia Paola Chiumiento	Track speed skating	Junior Women's 1000m sprint	13 October
Gold	Giorgio Ghisio Erba	Track speed skating	Junior Men's 1000m sprint	13 October
Gold	Duccio Marsili	Track speed skating	Senior Men's 1000m sprint	13 October
Silver	Ludovica Ambrosino	Artistic roller skating	Junior Ladies' Solo Dance	14
Silver	Luca Buonincontro	Artistic roller skating	Junior Men's Solo Dance	14 October
Bronze	Mariaclaudia Parziale	Artistic roller skating	Junior Ladies' Solo Dance	14 October
Gold	Roberta Sasso	Artistic roller skating	Senior Ladies' Solo Dance	15 October
Bronze	Yuri Allegranti	Artistic roller skating	Senior Men's Solo Dance	15 October
Gold	Precision Skate Bologna	Artistic roller skating	Junior Precision	16 October
Gold	Magic Skate	Artistic roller skating	Junior Quartets	16 October
Silver	Skate Stars	Artistic roller skating	Junior Show	16 October
Silver	Royal Eagles	Artistic roller skating	Junior Precision	16 October
Bronze	Division	Artistic roller skating	Junior Show	16 October
Silver	Sofia Paola Chiumiento	Road speed skating	Junior Women's One lap circuit	16 October
Bronze	Asia Negri	Road speed skating	Senior Women's One lap circuit	16 October
Bronze	Vincenzo Maiorca	Road speed skating	Senior Men's One lap circuit	16 October
Gold	Sincro Roller	Artistic roller skating	Senior Precision	17 Octoberù
Silver	Royal Eagles	Artistic roller skating	Senior Large Groups	17 October
Silver	Monza Precision Team	Artistic roller skating	Senior Precision	17 October
Bronze	Evolution	Artistic roller skating	Senior Small Groups	17 October
Bronze	Neovis	Artistic roller skating	Senior Quartets	17 October
Gold	Sofia Paola Chiumiento	Road speed skating	Junior Women's 100m sprint	17 October
Bronze	Vittoria Andreetta	Road speed skating	Junior Women's 100m sprint	17 October
Bronze	Edoardo Abis	Road speed skating	Junior Men's 100m sprint	17 October
Bronze	Asia Negri	Road speed skating	Senior Women's 100m sprint	17 October
Silver	Vincenzo Maiorca	Road speed skating	Senior Men's 100m sprint	17 October
Bronze	Allison Bella Arostegui Stet	Roller freestyle	Junior Women's Park	18 October

== Medals by sport ==
Italy achieved at least one podium finish in every single sport discipline featured in the competition program.

Sport	1st place, gold medalist(s)	2nd place, silver medalist(s)	3rd place, bronze medalist(s)	Total
Artistic skating	10	14	7	31
Inline alpine	3	4	3	10
Inline downhill	0	2	0	2
Inline freestyle	2	2	3	7
Inline hockey	1	0	0	1
Rink hockey	0	0	1	1
Roller freestyle	0	0	1	1
Scootering	0	1	0	1
Skateboarding	0	0	1	1
Skate cross	2	0	3	5
Speed skating	6	5	5	16
Total	24	28	24	76

== Multi-medallists ==
Athlete	Sport	1st place, gold medalist(s)	2nd place, silver medalist(s)	3rd place, bronze medalist(s)	Total
Sofia Paola Chiumiento	Speed skating	3	2	0	5
Lorenza Cesaris	Inline slalom	2	2	0	4
Matilde Arosio	Skate cross / Inline freestyle	1	1	2	4
Mattia Pe	Inline slalom	0	3	1	4
Cristian Rondi	Inline slalom	1	2	0	3
Roberta Sasso	Artistic skating	2	0	0	2
Ludovica Rimondi	Skate cross	2	0	0	2
Giorgio Ghisio Erba	Speed skating	2	0	0	2
Ludovica Ambrosino	Artistic skating	1	1	0	2
Luca Buonincontro	Artistic skating	1	1	0	2
Manuel Moretti	Inline freestyle	0	2	0	2
Edoardo Abis	Speed skating	0	1	1	2
Vincenzo Maiorca	Speed skating	0	1	1	2
Giulia Gamba	Inline slalom	0	1	1	2
Daniele Salzillo	Inline freestyle	0	1	1	2
Antonio Paoletta	Skate cross	0	0	2	2
Asia Negri	Speed skating	0	0	2	2

== Artistic roller skating ==
Italy proved its international leadership in artistic roller skating at the 2026 World Skate Games in Asunción, claiming world titles and medals across all major disciplines. The Italian squad dominated the Pairs and Dance competitions while delivering historic performances in Group disciplines, Solo Dance, and Inline skating.

=== Roller skating ===
Italian skaters achieved outstanding results in the Singles events, highlighted by Victoria Baldo winning the Junior Ladies world title and Costanza Biondi securing the bronze medal. In the Junior Men's category, Alessandro Costagliola earned a prestigious silver medal.

Athlete	Event	Short program	Long program	Total	Rank
Mirko Mazzo	Senior men	78.04 (5)	139.38 (4)	217.42	4th
Alex Chimetto	Senior men	69.49 (9)	121.98 (8)	191.47	11th
Luca Innocenti	Senior men	66.69 (11)	98.99 (12)	165.68	12th
Martina Stefani	Senior ladies	67.08 (4)	104.92 (6)	172.00	4th
Giada Romiti	Senior ladies	59.17 (9)	104.49 (7)	163.66	6th
Federica Pazzingrilli	Senior ladies	53.10 (11)	105.02 (5)	158.12	8th
Alessandro Costagliola	Junior men	84.97 (2)	154.96 (2)	239.93	2nd place, silver medalist(s)
Mattia Danesi	Junior men	72.38 (3)	—	—	4th
Victoria Baldo	Junior ladies	77.99 (1)	118.71 (2)	196.70	1st place, gold medalist(s)
Costanza Biondi	Junior ladies	66.53 (3)	110.76 (3)	177.29	3rd place, bronze medalist(s)

=== Solo dance ===
Roberta Sasso starred in the Solo Dance events, taking gold in the Senior Ladies category. The Italian team also claimed bronze through Yuri Allegranti in Senior Men, alongside two silvers (Ludovica Ambrosino, Luca Buonincontro) and a bronze (Mariaclaudia Parziale) in the Junior competitions.

Athlete	Event	Style dance	Free dance	Total	Rank
Roberta Sasso	Senior Ladies	70.65 (1)	90.58 (2)	161.23	1st place, gold medalist(s)
Caterina Artoni	Senior Ladies	64.37 (4)	87.36 (3)	151.73	4th
Yuri Allegranti	Senior Men	70.04 (3)	86.42 (4)	156.46	3rd place, bronze medalist(s)
Gherardo Altieri Degrassi	Senior Men	68.47 (4)	85.30 (5)	153.77	4th
Ludovica Ambrosino	Junior Ladies	65.64 (1)	81.30 (2)	146.94	2nd place, silver medalist(s)
Mariaclaudia Parziale	Junior Ladies	64.22 (3)	78.21 (3)	142.43	3rd place, bronze medalist(s)
Luca Buonincontro	Junior Men	69.22 (2)	86.36 (2)	155.58	2nd place, silver medalist(s)
Abramo Rocca	Junior Men	56.29 (6)	73.12 (5)	129.41	6th

=== Inline figure skating ===
Italy enjoyed a successful opening to the artistic skating program in the Inline events. Sofia Ciacia captured the Senior Ladies world title, with Clara Barattoni completing a 1–2 finish. Elvis Martinello and Giorgia Panebianco added two additional silver medals in Senior Men and Junior Ladies respectively.

Athlete	Event	Short program	Long program	Total	Rank
Elvis Martinello	Senior men	67.89 (2)	92.11 (2)	160.00	2nd place, silver medalist(s)
Sofia Ciacia	Senior ladies	56.11 (1)	71.81 (2)	127.92	1st place, gold medalist(s)
Clara Barattoni	Senior ladies	44.13 (2)	75.51 (1)	119.64	2nd place, silver medalist(s)
Giorgia Panebianco	Junior ladies	44.11 (2)	72.16 (3)	116.27	2nd place, silver medalist(s)
Chiara Santinon	Junior ladies	31.82 (7)	60.08 (4)	91.90	5th

=== Couple dance ===
The Italian dance couples delivered an outstanding performance, taking gold in Senior Dance with Gherardo Altieri Degrassi and Roberta Sasso, and silver with Caterina Artoni and Raoul Allegranti. Luca Buonincontro and Ludovica Ambrosino secured gold in Junior Dance, while Carlotta Bruzzi and Alessandro Grossi claimed silver.

Athletes	Event	Style dance	Free dance	Total	Rank
Roberta Sasso & Gherardo Altieri Degrassi	Senior dance	71.77 (1)	89.77 (1)	161.54	1st place, gold medalist(s)
Caterina Artoni & Raoul Allegranti	Senior dance	69.28 (2)	86.79 (3)	156.07	2nd place, silver medalist(s)
Elisa Cavina & Yuri Allegranti	Senior dance	64.41 (4)	83.87 (5)	148.28	5th
Ludovica Ambrosino & Luca Buonincontro	Junior dance	62.11 (2)	86.51 (1)	148.62	1st place, gold medalist(s)
Carlotta Bruzzi & Alessandro Grossi	Junior dance	65.45 (1)	80.57 (2)	146.02	2nd place, silver medalist(s)

=== Pairs ===
Italian athletes dominated the Pairs event, sweeping the entire Senior podium led by José Enrico Inglese and Angelica Polli (gold), Tommaso Cortini and Micol Mills (silver), and Alessandro Bozzini and Gloria Di Bella (bronze). Leonardo Malloggi and Maelle Milzi added another gold in the Junior event.

Athletes	Event	Short program	Long program	Total	Rank
Angelica Polli & Josè Enrico Inglese	Senior pairs	85.97 (1)	113.33 (2)	199.30	1st place, gold medalist(s)
Micol Mills & Tommaso Cortini	Senior pairs	82.38 (2)	112.33 (3)	194.71	2nd place, silver medalist(s)
Gloria Di Bella & Alessandro Bozzini	Senior pairs	72.14 (3)	114.55 (1)	186.69	3rd place, bronze medalist(s)
Maelle Milzi & Leonardo Malloggi	Junior pairs	63.23 (1)	90.24 (1)	153.47	1st place, gold medalist(s)
Martina Nale & Riccardo Nale	Junior pairs	60.48 (2)	84.45 (2)	144.93	2nd place, silver medalist(s)

=== Groups and Precision ===
In the Show and Precision group competitions, Italian clubs achieved remarkable success, winning world titles in Senior Precision (Sincro Roller), Junior Precision (Precision Skate Bologna), and Junior Quartets (Magic Skate).

Team / Club	Event	Program	Total	Rank
Royal Eagles	Senior Large Groups	Act II: What I'm Missing	38.24	2nd place, silver medalist(s)
Division	Senior Large Groups	Amen	34.05	5th
Cristal Skating Team	Senior Large Groups	The Beauty Program	33.74	6th
Evolution	Senior Small Groups	The Maestro's Factory	37.85	3rd place, bronze medalist(s)
Dejavu	Senior Small Groups	The Key to Success	37.78	4th
Diamante	Senior Small Groups	Breaking the Strings	36.55	6th
Sincro Roller	Senior Precision	—	75.71	1st place, gold medalist(s)
Monza Precision Team	Senior Precision	—	74.62	2nd place, silver medalist(s)
Precision Skate Bologna	Senior Precision	—	65.48	4th
Neovis	Senior Quartets	Shamans	61.27	3rd place, bronze medalist(s)
Dejavu	Senior Quartets	Tears of Light	47.12	7th
Skate Stars	Junior Show	Case Closed!	32.22	2nd place, silver medalist(s)
Division	Junior Show	The Sound of Silence	31.30	3rd place, bronze medalist(s)
Sinergy	Junior Show	I Am Gaudì	28.36	6th
Precision Skate Bologna	Junior Precision	—	66.55	1st place, gold medalist(s)
Royal Eagles	Junior Precision	—	63.35	2nd place, silver medalist(s)
Monza Precision Team	Junior Precision	—	48.47	6th
Magic Skate	Junior Quartets	Dual Soul	47.35	1st place, gold medalist(s)
Skate Stars	Junior Quartets	More Than Love	41.45	5th

== Inline slalom ==
The Italian Inline Alpine team delivered a dominant performance on the slopes of Cerro Lambaré at the 2026 World Skate Games, securing a total of 10 medals across all individual and team events.

=== Giant Slalom ===
Italy enjoyed a brilliant start to the Inline Alpine competitions with a three-medal haul in the Giant Slalom. Lorenza Cesaris claimed the world title in Senior Women by setting the fastest times in both runs, while Mattia Pe and David Fiorot captured silver and bronze respectively in Senior Men.

Athlete	Category	Run 1		Run 2		Total	
Athlete	Category	Time	Rank	Time	Rank	Time	Rank
Lorenza Cesaris	Senior Women	00:27.19	1	00:27.06	1	00:54.25	1st place, gold medalist(s)
Mattia Pe	Senior Men	00:26.80	2	00:26.47	2	00:53.27	2nd place, silver medalist(s)
David Fiorot	Senior Men	00:26.74	3	00:26.56	3	00:53.30	3rd place, bronze medalist(s)
Antonio Fanchini	Senior Men	00:26.73	4	00:26.77	5	00:53.50	4th
Cristian Rondi	Senior Men	00:26.57	5	00:27.03	6	00:53.60	5th
Giulia Gamba	Junior Women	00:32.79	13	00:28.72	4	01:01.51	4th
Elisa Negrinelli	Junior Women	00:33.87	15	00:28.48	6	01:02.35	6th

=== Slalom ===
In the Slalom competition, Mattia Pe added another podium finish to his personal tally by earning the bronze medal in Senior Men.

Athlete	Category	Run 1		Run 2		Total	
Athlete	Category	Time	Rank	Time	Rank	Time	Rank
Lorenza Cesaris	Senior Women	DSQ	—	—	—	—	DSQ
Mattia Pe	Senior Men	00:32.86	4	00:31.15	3	01:04.01	3rd place, bronze medalist(s)
David Fiorot	Senior Men	00:33.46	5	00:30.95	2	01:04.41	4th
Antonio Fanchini	Senior Men	00:40.72	12	00:32.21	7	01:12.93	10th
Cristian Rondi	Senior Men	00:32.24	3	DSQ	—	—	DSQ
Giulia Gamba	Junior Women	00:35.73	6	00:32.26	2	01:07.99	5th
Elisa Negrinelli	Junior Women	00:36.38	7	00:32.59	3	01:08.97	7th

=== Combined ===
The Combined event delivered a historic day for Italy with four additional medals. Lorenza Cesaris secured her second world title of the Games in Senior Women, while Cristian Rondi and Mattia Pe took gold and silver in Senior Men for an Italian 1–2 finish. Giulia Gamba rounded out the success by winning bronze in Junior Women.

Athlete	Category	Run 1 (SL)		Run 2 (GS)		Total	
Athlete	Category	Time	Rank	Time	Rank	Time	Rank
Cristian Rondi	Senior Men	00:30.41	1	00:29.71	3	01:00.12	1st place, gold medalist(s)
Mattia Pe	Senior Men	00:31.02	5	00:29.54	1	01:00.56	2nd place, silver medalist(s)
Antonio Fanchini	Senior Men	00:31.32	7	00:30.34	8	01:01.66	7th
David Fiorot	Senior Men	00:32.20	10	00:29.90	6	01:02.10	8th
Lorenza Cesaris	Senior Women	00:31.06	1	00:29.88	1	01:00.94	1st place, gold medalist(s)
Giulia Gamba	Junior Women	00:32.45	3	00:31.58	4	01:04.03	3rd place, bronze medalist(s)
Elisa Negrinelli	Junior Women	00:38.61	7	00:31.50	3	01:10.11	6th

=== Team events ===
The Italian national team completed the Inline Alpine competitions at the 2026 World Skate Games with two silver medals in the team events, behind Germany in both discipline finals.

Event	Athletes	Total Time	Rank
Team Giant Slalom	Lorenza Cesaris, Giulia Gamba, Cristian Rondi, Mattia Pe	03:34.73	2nd place, silver medalist(s)
Team Slalom	Elisa Negrinelli, Lorenza Cesaris, Cristian Rondi, Mattia Pe	03:41.12	2nd place, silver medalist(s)

== Inline downhill ==
The inline downhill events at the World Skate Games serve as the official world championship for the discipline. Italy entered a six-skater squad managed by head coach Valentina Liguori, featuring 2016 world champion Angelo Vecchi (competing as both athlete and coach), 2024 silver medalist Adrian Gumanita, former medalist Tiziano Ferrari, alongside young prospects Daniele Vecchi and Samuele Paradasi. Sabrina Vitarelli represented Italy as the sole competitor in the women's events.

=== Time trial ===
Athlete	Event	Final	Rank
Adrian Gumanita	Men's time trial	1:09.643	11
Angelo Vecchi	Men's time trial	1:13.378	29
Tiziano Ferrari	Men's time trial	1:09.323	10
Daniele Vecchi	Men's time trial	1:06.240	2nd place, silver medalist(s)
Samuele Paradassi	Men's time trial	1:10.473	16
Sabrina Vitarelli	Women's time trial	1:13.194	5

=== Knockout race ===
Athlete	Event	Round of 16	Quarterfinals	Semifinal	Final	Rank
Adrian Gumanita	Men's knockout race	1st	4th	Did not advance		
Tiziano Ferrari	Men's knockout race	3rd	Did not advance			
Daniele Vecchi	Men's knockout race	3rd	Did not advance			
Samuele Paradasi	Men's knockout race	1st	3rd	Did not advance		
Sabrina Vitarelli	Women's knockout race	-	2nd	2nd (FA)	2nd	2nd place, silver medalist(s)

== Inline freestyle ==
The Italian Inline Freestyle team delivered an outstanding campaign at the 2026 World Skate Games, securing a total of seven medals (two gold, two silver, and three bronze) across Speed Slalom, Team Speed, Battle, and Free Jump events.

=== Speed slalom ===
Italy started strong in the Speed Slalom events, claiming three individual medals. Manuel Moretti and Daniele Salzillo won silver and bronze respectively in Junior Men, while Matilde Arosio secured a bronze medal in Senior Women.

Athlete	Event	Qualification / Time Trial		Final / Knockout	
Athlete	Event	Result	Rank	Result	Rank
Alessandro Vignoni	Senior men's speed slalom	4.122	—	4.738	6
Gioele Zuliani	Senior men's speed slalom	4.195	—	4.787	7
Valerio Degli Agostini	Senior men's speed slalom	4.353	—	4.773	9
Matilde Arosio	Senior women's speed slalom	4.369	—	4.928	3rd place, bronze medalist(s)
Sveva Romano	Senior women's speed slalom	4.522	—	5.017	4
Manuel Moretti	Junior men's speed slalom	4.101	—	4.680	2nd place, silver medalist(s)
Daniele Salzillo	Junior men's speed slalom	3.974	—	4.628	3rd place, bronze medalist(s)
Lorenzo Di Massa	Junior men's speed slalom	4.081	—	4.970	6
Ilaria D'Orsi	Junior women's speed slalom	4.512	—	5.048	6
Siria Scipinotti	Junior women's speed slalom	4.524	—	5.066	7

=== Team speed slalom ===
In the Mixed Team Speed Slalom event, the Italian squad defeated France in the semifinals before capturing a silver medal after a hard-fought final against Chinese Taipei.

Athletes	Event	Semifinal	Final	Rank
Manuel Moretti; Daniele Salzillo; Sveva Romano; Matilde Arosio; Gioele Zuliani (sub); Ilaria D'Orsi (sub)	Mixed team speed slalom	France; W 5–2	Chinese Taipei; L 1–5	2nd place, silver medalist(s)

=== Classic slalom ===
Italian athletes delivered competitive routines in the Classic Slalom competitions, with Lorenzo Demuru and Manuel Moretti achieving fifth-place finishes in Senior Men and Junior Men respectively.

Athlete	Event	Qualification		Final	
Athlete	Event	Result	Rank	Result	Rank
Lorenzo Demuru	Senior men's classic slalom	—	—	—	5
Valerio Degli Agostini	Senior men's classic slalom	—	—	—	6
Lorenzo Guslandi	Senior men's classic slalom	—	—	—	7
Nikole Moretti	Senior women's classic slalom	—	3	Did not advance	
Francesca Pettinari	Senior women's classic slalom	—	—	Did not advance	
Manuel Moretti	Junior men's classic slalom	—	—	—	5
Federico Mainolfi	Junior men's classic slalom	—	—	—	6
Daniele Salzillo	Junior men's classic slalom	—	—	—	9
Viola Luciani	Junior women's classic slalom	—	—	—	5
Rebecca Pirani	Junior women's classic slalom	—	—	—	13

=== Pair classic slalom ===
Italy fielded two teams in the Pair Classic Slalom competition, placing fifth with Valerio Degli Agostini and Nexia Gualdi, and seventh with Lorenzo Demuru and Nikole Moretti.

Athletes	Event	Result	Rank
Valerio Degli Agostini; Gualdi	Pair classic slalom	—	5
Lorenzo Demuru; Nikole Moretti	Pair classic slalom	—	7

=== Freestyle slide ===
In the Freestyle Slide event, both Gioele Zuliani and Andrea Mandolesi reached the final stage, finishing in fifth place.

Athlete	Event	Rank
Gioele Zuliani	Senior men's freestyle slide	5
Andrea Mandolesi	Senior men's freestyle slide	5

=== Free jump ===
The Free Jump competition brought major triumph for Italy, as Francesca Brivio (135 cm) and Gianmarco Savi (165 cm) dominated the Senior Women's and Senior Men's events to earn two world titles.

Athlete	Event	Result	Rank
Gianmarco Savi	Senior men's free jump	165 cm	1st place, gold medalist(s)
Francesca Brivio	Senior women's free jump	135 cm	1st place, gold medalist(s)
Matilde Arosio	Senior women's free jump	110 cm	4th
Antonio Paoletta	Junior men's free jump	140 cm	5th

=== Freestyle battle ===
In the Freestyle Battle events, Lorenzo Demuru delivered an excellent performance to earn the bronze medal in Senior Men, while Nikole Moretti, Daniele Salzillo, and Nexia Gualdi all secured fourth-place finishes in their respective categories.

Athlete	Event	Rank
Lorenzo Demuru	Senior men's freestyle battle	3rd place, bronze medalist(s)
Valerio Degli Agostini	Senior men's freestyle battle	5th
Lorenzo Guslandi	Senior men's freestyle battle	9th
Nikole Moretti	Senior women's freestyle battle	4th
Francesca Pettinari	Senior women's freestyle battle	9th
Daniele Salzillo	Junior men's freestyle battle	4th
Federico Mainolfi	Junior men's freestyle battle	5th
Manuel Moretti	Junior men's freestyle battle	7th
Nexia Gualdi	Junior women's freestyle battle	4th
Viola Luciani	Junior women's freestyle battle	5th
Rebecca Pirani	Junior women's freestyle battle	13th

== Inline hockey ==
The inline hockey events at the World Skate Games serve as the official World Skate Inline Hockey World Championship. Italy qualified four national teams for the tournament, competing in both the senior (men's and women's) and junior (men's and women's) competitions.

=== Senior tournaments ===
Summary

Team	Event	Group Stage					Playoff	Quarterfinal	Semifinal	Final / BM	
Team	Event	Opposition Score	Opposition Score	Opposition Score	Opposition Score	Rank	Opposition Score	Opposition Score	Opposition Score	Opposition Score	Rank
Italy men's	Men's tournament	(Colombia) Colombia; W 6-1	(Argentina) Argentina; W 5-2	(Czech Republic) Czech Republic; L 4-5	(Chinese Taipei) Chinese Tapei; W 21-2	2nd	(Germany) Germany; OTW 4-3	(France) France; OTL 3-4	(Argentina) Argentina; W 10-2	Russia; W 7-2	5th
Italy women's	Women's tournament	(Argentina) Argentina; OTL 1-2	(Spain) Spain; L 1-7	(Uruguay) Uruguay; W 20-0	(France) France; L 1-5	4th	-	(Namibia) Namibia; L 2-3	(Mexico) Mexico; W 3-2	(Argentina) Argentina; W 4-3	5th

Men's roster: Daniele Facchinetti, Ermanno Laner, Francesco Campulla, Lorenzo Campulla, Pietro Ederle, Giacomo Masiero, Ettore Sesana, Alessio Lettera, Alessandro Rossetto, Elia Calore, Riccardo Dal Ben, Andrea Delfino, Davide Dal Sasso. Head coach: Denis Sommadossi.

Women's roster: Eugenia Pompanin, Emma Liprandi, Arianna Bisi, Sara Guazzi, Rebecca Roccella, Sharon Roccella, Zoe De Lazzari, Giovanna Speranza, Emma Pol, Eleonora Trombetta, Laura Giannini, Alessia Bergamini, Veronica Novelli, Giorgia Zanella.

=== Junior tournaments ===
The junior inline hockey events serve as the official world championship for junior national teams. Italy entered teams in both the junior men's and junior women's tournaments.

Summary

Team	Event	Group Stage					Playoff	Quarterfinal	Semifinal	Final / BM	
Team	Event	Opposition Score	Opposition Score	Opposition Score	Opposition Score	Rank	Opposition Score	Opposition Score	Opposition Score	Opposition Score	Rank
Italy junior men's	Junior men's tournament	(Mexico) Mexico; W 13–1	(Slovakia) Slovakia; W 7–4	(Colombia) Colombia; W SO: 3–2	(France) France; W 3–2	1st	South Korea; W 17–2	(Chinese Taipei) Chinese Tapei; W 5–0	(Slovakia) Slovakia; W 4–3	France; W 7-5	1st place, gold medalist(s)
Italy junior women's	Junior women's tournament	(United States) USA; L 0–8	(Colombia) Colombia; L 5-6	(Brazil) Brazil; W 3-2	-	3rd	-	(Argentina) Argentina; OTL 2-3	(India) India; W 4-1	Brazil; W 4-2	5th

Junior Men's roster: Angelo Kevin Bonsu, Emanuele Corazzari, Giampaolo Bastianoni, Riccardo Gloder, Riccardo Quartuccio, Leo Lazzari, Mattia Albanti, Mattia Marchet, Mattia Guerriero, Leonardo De Angelis, Ruggero Meconi, Mattia Grandelli, Lorenzo Mariani, Emanuel Mendola. Head coach: Andrea Bellini.

Junior Women's roster: Alice Zanolin, Greta Leger, Alessia Bergamini, Leonor Campiotti Pereira, Angelica Cipriano, Ines Dalla Nora, Chiara De Meo, Gaia Esposito, Veronica Frison, Camila Porto, Stefania Rizzoli, Lisa Sole Ronca, Alina Tarantola, Vittoria Trombetta. Head coach: Martina Gavazzi.

== Rink hockey ==
Italy entered three national teams in the rink hockey competitions: the men's under-19 team, the women's senior team, and the men's senior team.

=== Women's senior tournament ===
The Italian women's national team, head-coached by Valerio Antezza, competed at the COP Arena. Played in a single round-robin group format, Italy faced Brazil, India, Portugal, Mexico, and Colombia over five consecutive days from 4 to 8 October, with the top two teams advancing to the semifinals.

==== Squad ====
Head coach: Valerio Antezza

Pos.	Player	Club
GK	Veronica Caretta	(Spain) Gijón HC
GK	Giorgia Meneghello	(Italy) Roller Matera
DF/MF	Pamela Lapolla	(Italy) Roller Matera
DF/MF	Anna Orsato	(Italy) HC Valdagno
DF/MF	Ludovica Rossetto	(Italy) HC Valdagno
DF/MF	Elena Tamiozzo	(Italy) Hockey Trissino
FW	Sofia Bertinato	(Italy) Hockey Trissino
FW	Matilde Ghirardello	(Italy) HC Valdagno
FW	Luisa Lamacchia	(Italy) Roller Matera
FW	Laura Rubega	(Italy) Hockey Trissino

==== Group stage ====
Team	Event	Group Stage						Semifinal	Final / BM	
Team	Event	Opposition Score	Opposition Score	Opposition Score	Opposition Score	Opposition Score	Rank	Opposition Score	Opposition Score	Rank
Italy Women's	Women's tournament	Brazil; W 13-1	India; W 21-0	Portugal; W 4-1	Mexico; W 21-0	(Colombia) Colombia; W 1-0	1st	(Argentina) Argentina; L 0-4	Portugal; W 3-2	1st place, gold medalist(s)

=== Men's senior tournament ===
Coached by Alessandro Bertolucci, the Italian men's national team held a pre-tournament preparation camp in San Juan, Argentina with friendly matches against Argentina and Angola before travelling to Asunción on 9 October. Competing at the COP Arena, Italy was drawn into Group A alongside Spain, Switzerland, and Portugal.

==== Squad ====
Head coach: Alessandro Bertolucci

Pos.	Player	Club
GK	Bruno Sgaria	(Italy) Hockey Trissino
GK	Mattia Verona	(Italy) Hockey Bassano
GK	Stefano Zampoli	(Italy) Hockey Trissino
DF/MF	Morgan Antonioni	(Italy) Amatori Wasken Lodi
DF/MF	Leonardo Diquigiovanni	(Italy) Hockey Trissino
DF/MF	Davide Gavioli	(Italy) Hockey Trissino
DF/MF	Francisco Ipinazar	(Italy) Hockey Bassano
FW	Andrea Borgo	(Italy) Hockey Trissino
FW	Francesco Compagno	(Italy) Amatori Wasken Lodi
FW	Andrea Malagoli	(Italy) Hockey Trissino
FW	Gioele Piccoli	(Italy) Hockey Trissino
FW	Alberto Pozzato	(Italy) Hockey Bassano

==== Group stage ====
Team	Event	Group Stage				Quarterfinal	Semifinal	Final / BM	
Team	Event	Opposition Score	Opposition Score	Opposition Score	Rank	Opposition Score	Opposition Score	Opposition Score	Rank
Italy Men's	Men's tournament	Spain; L 2-3	Switzerland; W 10-2	Portugal; L 0-4	3rd	Argentina; L 1-4	Chile; L 2-3	Switzerland; W 4-2	7th

=== Men's Under-19 tournament ===
The Italian under-19 national team, coached by Pierluigi Bresciani, competed at the SND Arenita in Asunción. Drawn into Group A alongside Spain, Switzerland, and Argentina, the team opened its campaign against Spain on 4 October. All four teams in the group advanced to the quarterfinals scheduled for 8 October.

==== Squad ====
Head coach: Pierluigi Bresciani

Pos.	Player	Club
GK	Giovanni Cunegatti	(Italy) HC Valdagno
GK	Filippo Poletti	(Italy) CGC Viareggio
DF/MF	Elia Cardella	(Italy) Pumas Viareggio
DF/MF	Simone Ceretta	(Italy) Hockey Trissino
DF/MF	Giovanni Pesavento	(Italy) HRC Monza
DF/MF	Francesco Tognetti	(Italy) Hockey Trissino
FW	Edoardo Boscaro	(Italy) Hockey Trissino
FW	Lorenzo Giovannelli	(Italy) Forte dei Marmi
FW	Jacopo Reniero	(Italy) Hockey Trissino
FW	Andrea Tognetti	(Italy) Hockey Trissino

==== Group stage ====
Team	Event	Group Stage				Quarterfinal	Semifinal	Final / BM	
Team	Event	Opposition Score	Opposition Score	Opposition Score	Rank	Opposition Score	Opposition Score	Opposition Score	Rank
Men's U19 Italy	Men's U19 tournament	Spain; L 1-4	Switzerland; W 7-0	Argentina; D 2-2	2nd	Colombia; W 13-1	Portugal; L 3-4	Argentina; L 4-6	4th

== Roller freestyle ==
=== Park ===
Italian roller freestyle skaters closed the Park competition with a historic bronze medal by Allison Bella Arostegui Stet in the Junior Women's event, marking the country's first-ever World Championship medal in the discipline.

Athlete	Category	Qualification	Final	Rank
Allison Bella Arostegui Stet	Junior Women	-	3th	3rd place, bronze medalist(s)
Matvei Mattivi	Junior Men	10th	-	-

=== Street ===
Athlete	Event	Rank
Luca Spitaleri	Senior men's street	29th
Gianluca Asunis	Senior men's street	41st
Anelim Arostegui Stet	Senior women's street	13th
Matvei Mattivi	Junior men's street	12th
Giulia Tait	Junior women's street	7th
Allison Bella Arostegui Stet	Junior women's street	12th

== Scooter ==
=== Street ===
Italy was represented by four athletes in the Street Scooter events, led by head coach Aurelio Gelmi and technical director Stefano Viotti. In the Junior category, Stefano Marzella won the silver medal, repeating his second-place finish from the 2025 World Championships in Sakai, Japan. In the Men's Pro category, Italian riders achieved an 8th and a 13th-place finish.

- Team staff:
  - Head coach: Aurelio Gelmi
  - Technical manager: Stefano Viotti
  - Squad: Lorenzo Bardella, Giulio Filippi, Davide Marasca, Stefano Marzella

Athlete	Event	Final Rank
Stefano Marzella	Junior men	2nd place, silver medalist(s)
Giulio Filippi	Men's Pro	8th
Davide Marasca	Men's Pro	13th
Lorenzo Bardella	Men's Pro	Unranked

== Skateboarding ==
The skateboarding events at the World Skate Games serve as the official World Skateboarding Championship, awarding world titles across five disciplines: Park, Street, Vert, Downhill, and Slalom between 29 September and 18 October 2026. The Vert competition opened the skateboarding program at the Palacio de López, featuring Francesco Uguccioni as the sole Italian entrant. The Park team, managed by head coach Daniele Galli, and the Street team, led by head coach Mattia Restante, competed at the Paraguayan Olympic Committee venue. Downhill (managed by Matteo Dell'Orto) and Slalom (managed by player-coach Gianluca Bellomo) took place on the Cerro Lambaré hill course.

=== Park ===
Athlete	Event	Qualification		Quarterfinal		Semifinal		Final	
Athlete	Event	Score	Rank	Score	Rank	Score	Rank	Score	Rank
Alessandro Mazzara	Men's park	72.00	9	80.61	13	87.27	10	Did not advance	
Alessandro Sorgente	Men's park	13.12	73	Did not advance					
Guglielmo Marin	Men's park	63.75	22	58.75	35	Did not advance			
Ivan Federico	Men's park	40.65	43	Did not advance					
Rafael Tomè	Men's park	63.50	23	58.50	38	Did not advance			
Mattia Murroni	Men's park	35.00	47	Did not advance					
Francesco Uguccioni	Men's park	26.20	59	Did not advance					
Greta Samaritani	Women's park	14.65	64	Did not advance					

=== Street ===
Athlete	Event	Qualification		Quarterfinal		Semifinal		Final	
Athlete	Event	Score	Rank	Score	Rank	Score	Rank	Score	Rank
Agustin Aquila	Men's street	13.00	98	Did not advance					
Andrea Lembo	Men's street	38.15	39	Did not advance					
Gaia Urbinati	Women's street	19.11	52	Did not advance					
Irene Panzavolta	Women's street	28.98	41	Did not advance					

=== Vert ===
Athlete	Event	Qualification		Final	
Athlete	Event	Score	Rank	Score	Rank
Francesco Uguccioni	Men's vert	56.68	14	Did not advance	

== Downhill ==
Downhill competitions awarded two sets of medals: one for the **Time Trial** (consisting of three qualification runs: Q1, Q2, and Q3) and one for the **Elimination / Mass Start race** (progressing through the round of 32, round of 16, quarterfinals, semifinals, and finals).

=== Time trial ===
Athlete	Event	Run 1 (Q1)	Run 2 (Q2)	Run 3 (Q3)	Best Time	Rank
Marco Zeni	Men's time trial	1:03.454	1:06.418 (6th)	1:06.604	1:06.604	5
Stefano Barbizzi	Men's time trial	1:03.344	1:06.448 (8th)	1:06.693	1:06.693	6
Giulia Bottazzin	Women's time trial	—	1:12.371 (6th)	1:11.365	1:11.365	3rd place, bronze medalist(s)

=== Knockout race ===
Athlete	Event	Round of 32	Round of 16	Quarterfinals	Semifinals	Final	Rank
Marco Zeni	Men's downhill	1st	4th	Did not advance			—
Stefano Barbizzi	Men's downhill	1st	2nd	1st	2nd (FA)	4th	4
Giulia Bottazzin	Women's downhill	—		1st	3rd (FB)	1st	5

== Skate Cross ==
=== Team cross ===
Italy secured its first gold medal of the Games in the women's team cross event, with Italy 1 (Matilde Arosio, Alice Delfino, and Ludovica Rimondi) defeating France 2 in the semifinals and beating France 1 in the final.

Team / Athletes	Event	Qualification	Semifinal	Final / BM	
Team / Athletes	Event	Qualification	Opposition Result	Opposition Result	Rank
Italy 2 Luca Borromeo; Antonio Paoletta	Men's team cross	Q	(France) FRA-2; L	(Italy) ITA-1; W	3rd place, bronze medalist(s)
Italy 1 Massimo Barbi; Alessandro Vignoni	Men's team cross	Q	(France) FRA-1; L	(Italy) ITA-2; L	4
Italy 1 Matilde Arosio; Alice Delfino; Ludovica Rimondi	Women's team cross	Q	(France) FRA-2; W	(France) FRA-1; W	1st place, gold medalist(s)
Italy 2 Sofia Davito Moci; Serena Davito Moci	Women's team cross	DNF	—	—	DNF

=== Senior ===
Athlete	Event	Time Trials	Heats	Semifinal	Final	Rank
Luca Borromeo	Men's skate cross				4th	4
Massimo Barbi	Men's skate cross		4th	Did not advance		—
Alessandro Vignoni	Men's skate cross		3rd	Did not advance		—
Matilde Arosio	Women's skate cross				3rd	3rd place, bronze medalist(s)
Alice Delfino	Women's skate cross				2nd	6
Sofia Davito Moci	Women's skate cross				1st	5
Ludovica Rimondi	Women's skate cross				1st	1st place, gold medalist(s)

=== Junior ===
Athlete	Event	Time Trials	Heats	Semifinal	Final	Rank
Antonio Paoletta	Junior men's skate cross				3rd	3rd place, bronze medalist(s)
Serena Davito Moci	Junior women's skate cross				—	—

== Speed skating ==
The Italian speed skating delegation delivered an impressive campaign across both track and road disciplines at the 2026 World Skate Games, bringing home a total of 16 medals (5 gold, 6 silver, and 5 bronze). Key performances came from Giorgio Ghisio Erba, Sofia Paola Chiumiento, and senior veteran Duccio Marsili, all securing world titles.

=== Track speed skating ===
==== 200m Dual time trial ====
Athlete	Category	Qualification		Final		Final Rank
Athlete	Category	Time	Rank	Time	Rank	Final Rank
Sofia Paola Chiumiento	Junior Women	00:18.641	1	00:18.450	1	1st place, gold medalist(s)
Vittoria Andreetta	Junior Women	00:19.524	—	00:19.882	12	12th
Edoardo Abis	Junior Men	00:17.805	—	00:17.757	4	4th
Francesco Onesti	Junior Men	00:18.208	14	—	—	14th
Asia Negri	Senior Women	00:19.200	—	00:18.935	8	8th
Alice Sorcionovo	Senior Women	00:19.232	—	00:19.341	12	12th
Vincenzo Maiorca	Senior Men	00:17.305	—	00:17.363	5	5th
Duccio Marsili	Senior Men	00:17.512	—	00:17.401	7	7th

==== 500m + D sprint ====
Athlete	Category	Qualification		Quarterfinals		Semifinals		Final		Final Rank
Athlete	Category	Time	Rank	Time	Rank	Time	Rank	Time	Rank	Final Rank
Sofia Paola Chiumiento	Junior Women	00:45.160	1	00:44.270	1	00:44.026	1	00:44.359	2	2nd place, silver medalist(s)
Giulia Marelli	Junior Women	00:46.841	3	00:44.661	4	—	—	—	—	13th
Edoardo Abis	Junior Men	00:42.104	2	00:42.173	1	00:42.691	2	00:42.355	2	2nd place, silver medalist(s)
Francesco Onesti	Junior Men	00:43.116	3	—	—	—	—	—	—	19th
Asia Negri	Senior Women	00:44.642	1	00:44.287	2	00:44.075	4	—	—	7th
Alice Sorcionovo	Senior Women	00:00.000	DNF	—	—	—	—	—	—	32nd
Duccio Marsili	Senior Men	00:40.717	1	00:41.168	1	00:42.472	4	—	—	8th
Vincenzo Maiorca	Senior Men	00:41.026	1	00:41.620	3	—	—	—	—	9th

==== 5,000m Points ====
Athlete	Category	Qualification		Final		Final Rank
Athlete	Category	Points	Rank	Points	Rank	Final Rank
Agnese Dominoni	Junior Women	8 pts	2	11 pts	5	5th
Giorgia Fossemo Salvemme	Junior Women	2 pts	12	3 pts	8	8th
Giorgio Ghisio Erba	Junior Men	0 pts	13	2 pts	8	8th
Matteo Ponziani	Junior Men	6 pts	4	6 pts	15	15th
Melissa Gatti	Senior Women	3 pts	7	7 pts	8	8th
Irene Paganelli	Senior Women	0 pts	12	—	—	31st
Daniel Niero	Senior Men	15 pts	3	20 pts	6	6th
Marco Bedon	Senior Men	2 pts	10	2 pts	24	24th

==== 10,000m Elimination ====
Athlete	Category	Final Rank
Giorgia Fossemo Salvemme	Junior Women	9th
Agnese Dominoni	Junior Women	13th
Giorgio Ghisio Erba	Junior Men	1st place, gold medalist(s)
Matteo Ponziani	Junior Men	11th
Melissa Gatti	Senior Women	17th
Sofia Saronni	Senior Women	23rd
Daniel Niero	Senior Men	2nd place, silver medalist(s)
Giuseppe Bramante	Senior Men	40th

==== 1000m sprint ====
Athlete	Category	Qualification		Semifinals		Final		Final Rank
Athlete	Category	Time	Rank	Time	Rank	Time	Rank	Final Rank
Sofia Paola Chiumiento	Junior Women	01:28.329	1	01:27.928	1	01:28.188	1	1st place, gold medalist(s)
Giulia Marelli	Junior Women	01:29.971	2	01:28.074	4	01:30.625	6	6th
Giorgio Ghisio Erba	Junior Men	01:22.948	1	01:21.589	4	01:24.815	1	1st place, gold medalist(s)
Daniele Pennavaria	Junior Men	01:23.112	5	01:22.988	8	—	—	8th
Melissa Gatti	Senior Women	01:26.927	4	—	—	—	—	19th
Sofia Saronni	Senior Women	01:29.874	4	—	—	—	—	21st
Duccio Marsili	Senior Men	01:21.667	1	01:20.238	1	01:21.918	1	1st place, gold medalist(s)
Giuseppe Bramante	Senior Men	01:22.021	1	—	—	—	—	13th

==== Relay ====
Athletes	Category	Qualification		Final		Final Rank
Athletes	Category	Time	Rank	Time	Rank	Final Rank
Agnese Dominoni, Giorgia Fossemo Salvemme, Giulia Marelli, Sofia Paola Chiumiento	Junior Women	04:24.785	2	DQ	4	4th
Daniele Pennavaria, Edoardo Abis, Giorgio Ghisio Erba, Matteo Ponziani	Junior Men	04:07.003	4	—	—	—
Asia Negri, Alice Sorcionovo, Sofia Saronni, Melissa Gatti	Senior Women	04:15.279	3	04:14.953	5	5th
Daniel Niero, Duccio Marsili, Giuseppe Bramante, Vincenzo Maiorca	Senior Men	03:53.424	2	04:10.840	6	6th

=== Road speed skating ===
==== One lap circuit ====
Athlete	Category	Qualification		Quarterfinals		Semifinals		Final		Final Rank
Athlete	Category	Time	Rank	Time	Rank	Time	Rank	Time	Rank	Final Rank
Sofia Paola Chiumiento	Junior Women	00:30.745	1	00:33.612	1	00:33.750	2	00:32.286	2	2nd place, silver medalist(s)
Giulia Marelli	Junior Women	00:32.186	1	00:33.834	2	00:34.381	5	—	—	9th
Edoardo Abis	Junior Men	00:29.591	2	00:32.176	1	00:33.168	4	—	—	7th
Francesco Onesti	Junior Men	00:59.887	5	—	—	—	—	—	—	30th
Asia Negri	Senior Women	00:32.465	1	00:32.248	1	00:31.969	2	00:31.768	3	3rd place, bronze medalist(s)
Alice Sorcionovo	Senior Women	00:41.126	2	—	—	—	—	—	—	10th
Vincenzo Maiorca	Senior Men	00:31.118	1	00:30.643	2	00:30.264	2	00:29.937	3	3rd place, bronze medalist(s)
Duccio Marsili	Senior Men	00:46.417	6	—	—	—	—	—	—	33rd

==== 15,000m Elimination ====
Athlete	Category	Final Rank
Agnese Dominoni	Junior Women	6th
Giorgia Fossemo Salvemme	Junior Women	14th
Elia Nisi	Junior Men	16th
Giorgio Ghisio Erba	Junior Men	25th
Melissa Gatti	Senior Women	5th
Irene Paganelli	Senior Women	11th
Daniel Niero	Senior Men	4th
Giuseppe Bramante	Senior Men	14th
