= Goolsbee =

Goolsbee is a surname. Notable people with the surname include:

- Austan Goolsbee (born 1969), American economist
- Jennifer Goolsbee (born 1968), US-born German ice dancer
