= Bördner =

Bördner, Bordner is a German surname. Notable people with the surname include:

- D.M. Bordner, pen name of Tim Patten
- Elias Bördner (born 2002), German footballer
- Otti Geschka (born 1939), born Ottilie Bördner
