= 2026 World Skate Games =

International multi-sport event

- Host city: Asunción
- Country: Paraguay
- Motto: United by Wheels
- Nations: 91
- Athletes: 6000
- Dates: 2–18 October
- Website: Official website

The 2026 World Skate Games were the 5th edition of the World Skate Games, and were held in Asunción, Paraguay, from 2 to 18 October 2026. It is the second time the games take place in South America after the 2022 games, held in Buenos Aires, Argentina.

The Games featured 12 sports, one e-sport and 40 disciplines, with 154 world titles awarded. Over 6,000 athletes from 91 different nations took part of the games.

== Opening ceremony ==
The opening ceremony took place on 2 October 2026 at Arena COP and featured performances from multiple Paraguayan artists Elías Glz, Mauri Román, Karim Manzur, Maxi Bonnin, Bruno Méndez, Ibuki Aran, Drago Mondragón, Guttyrbs, DJ OcO, Emma Sofía, Yamila Ruiz, Aleshit, El Princi, Avakuete, Jazmín del Paraguay, and Oudi The Kidd, accompanied by the Paraguayan National Symphony Orchestra.

During the ceremony, the games presented its official anthem for the first time and unveiled the design for the medals, inspired by the Galoperas, a Paraguayan tradition involving "women who dance and spin with grace and balance".

== Venues ==
All events took place in venues within the Greater Asunción area.

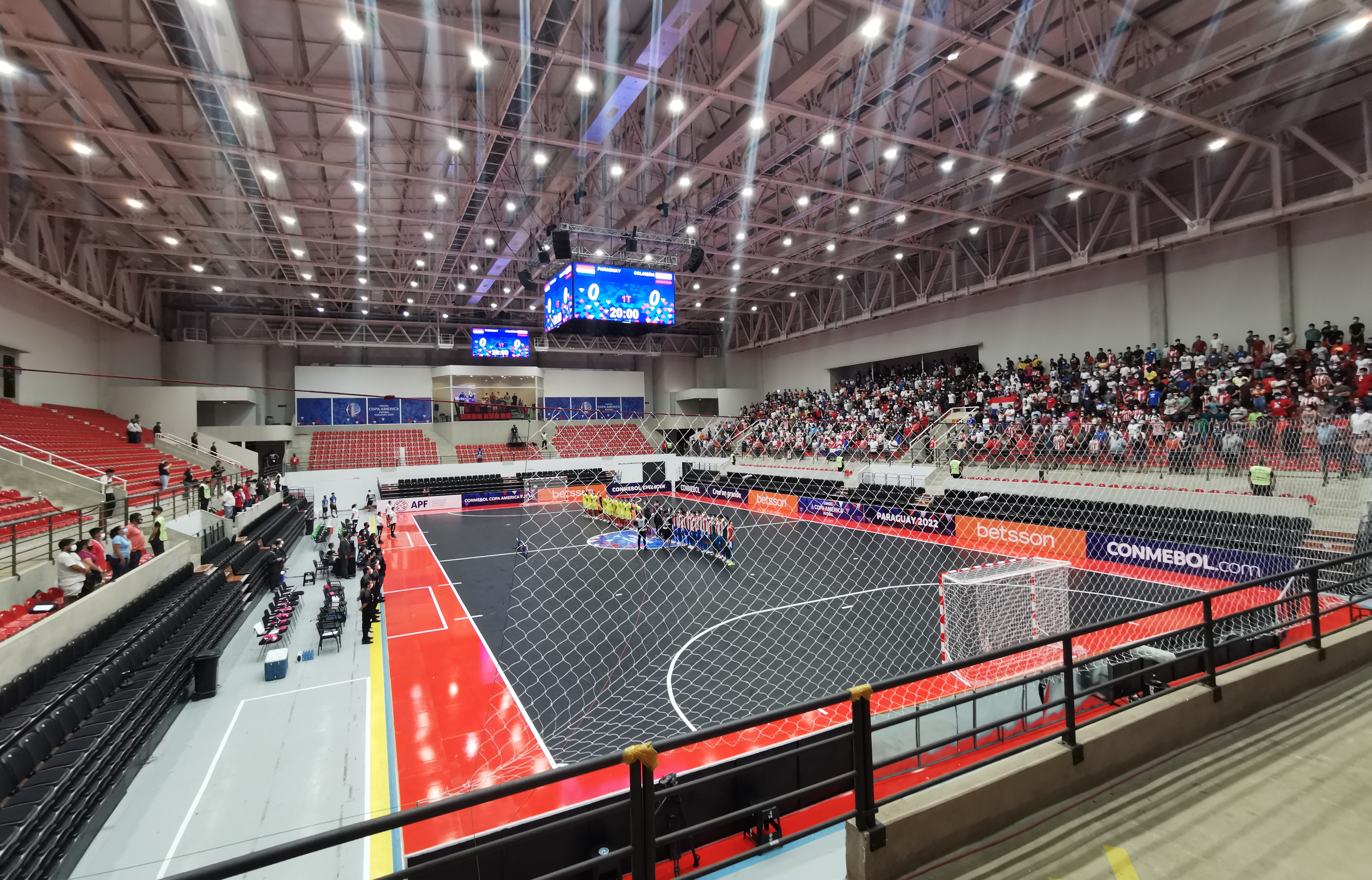
Artistic Skating will take place at SND Arena, within the Secretaría Nacional de Deportes.

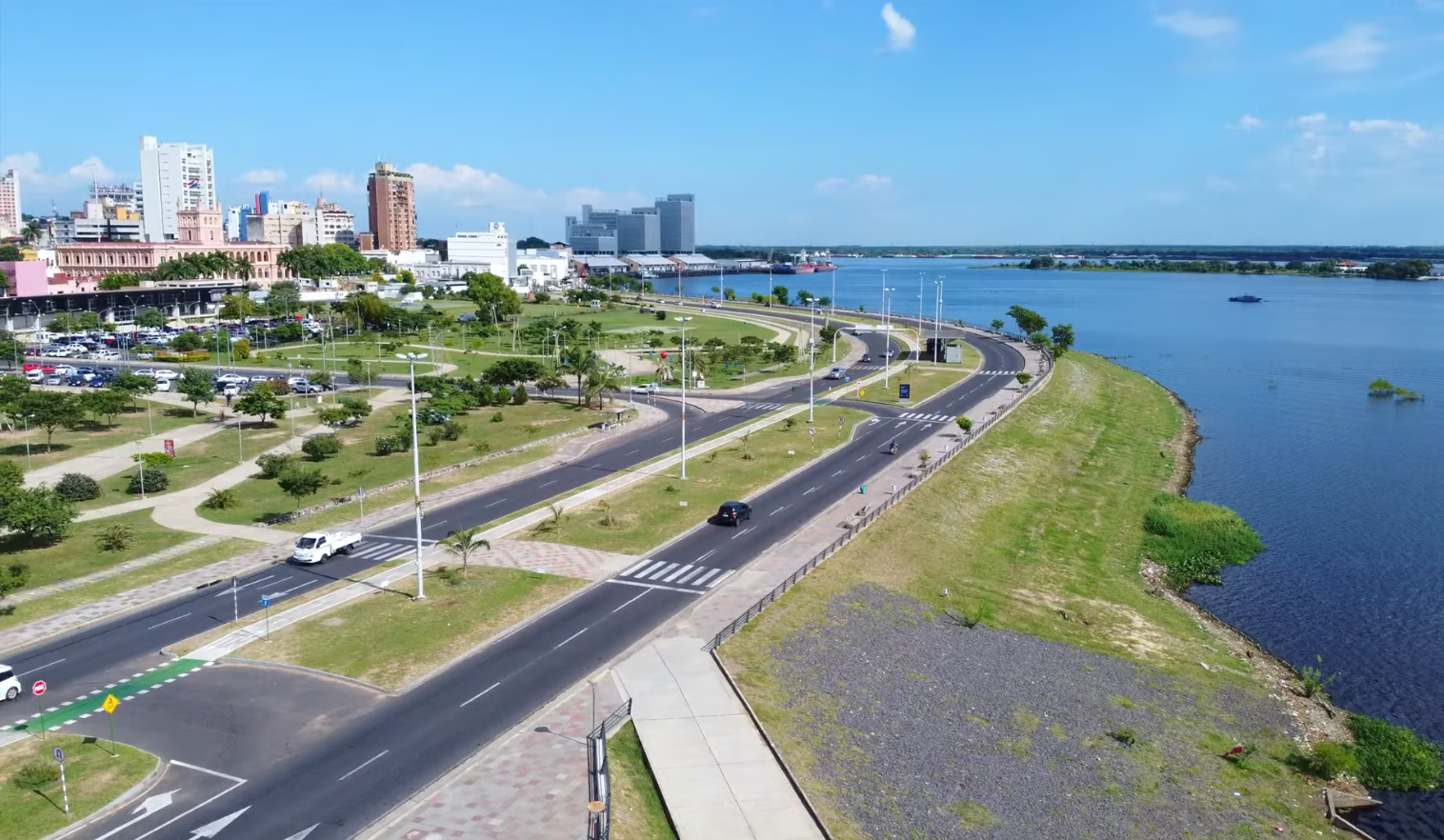
Asunción's Costanera (Riverside Road) is going to held some speed skating disciplines.

| Venue | | Sports |
|---|---|---|
| Parque Olímpico | COP Arena | Rink hockey |
| Parque Olímpico | Urban Sports Center | Inline hockey |
| Parque Olímpico | National Olympic Velodrome | Speed skating (Track); Inline hockey |
| Parque Olímpico | Olympic Training Center | Roller derby |
| Parque Olímpico | Street Skate Park | Roller freestyle (Street); Skateboarding (Street); Scootering (Street) |
| Parque Olímpico | Skate Park | Roller freestyle (Park); Skateboarding (Park); Scootering (Park) |
| Parque Olímpico | Cross Track | Skate cross |
| Secretaría Nacional de Deportes | SND Arena | Artistic skating |
| Secretaría Nacional de Deportes | SND Arenita | Rink hockey |
| Secretaría Nacional de Deportes | Gymnastics Pavillion | Inline freestyle |
| Avenida Costanera Norte | | Speed skating (road, marathon) |
| Palacio de los López Esplanade | | Roller freestyle (vert); Skateboarding (vert) |
| Cerro Lambaré | | Slalom skateboarding Inline slalom Inline downhill Skateboarding downhill Street luge |

== Participating nations ==
57 nations have registered for the games:

- Angola
- Argentina
- Australia
- Austria
- Belgium
- Benin
- Bolivia
- Brazil
- Canada
- Chile
- Democratic Republic of the Congo
- Colombia
- Costa Rica
- Croatia
- Czech Republic
- Denmark
- Dominican Republic
- Ecuador
- Egypt
- El Salvador
- Spain
- France
- (United Kingdom) Great Britain
- Germany
- Greece
- Guatemala
- Honduras
- Hungary
- India
- Iran
- (Republic of Ireland) Ireland
- Italy
- Japan
- South Korea
- Mexico
- Mozambique
- Namibia
- Netherlands
- Nigeria
- New Zealand
- Pakistan
- Paraguay
- Peru
- Poland
- Portugal
- South Africa
- Russia
- Senegal
- Slovenia
- Slovakia
- Switzerland
- Chinese Taipei
- Turkey
- Ukraine
- Uruguay
- United States
- Venezuela

== Sports ==
The following sports were contested:

- Artistic skating (22)
- Inline downhill (4)
- Inline freestyle (22)
- Inline hockey (4)
- Inline slalom (14)
- Rink hockey (4)
- Roller freestyle
  - Park (4)
  - Street (4)
  - Vert (1)
- Scootering
  - Park (3)
  - Street (3)
- Skate cross (6)
- Skateboarding
  - Slalom (6)
  - Downhill (4)
  - Street luge (4)
  - Park (2)
  - Street (2)
  - Vert (2)
- Speed
  - Track (24)
  - Road (12)
  - Marathon (4)

== Calendar ==
The schedule was as follows:

| OC | Opening ceremony | ● | Event competitions | 1 | Gold medal events | CC | Closing ceremony |

| Sports | | October | | | | | | | | | | | | | | | | | | Events |
| Sports | | 1st Thu | 2nd Fri | 3rd Sat | 4th Sun | 5th Mon | 6th Tue | 7th Wed | 8th Thu | 9th Fri | 10th Sat | 11th Sun | 12th Mon | 13th Tue | 14th Wed | 15th Thu | 16th Fri | 17th Sat | 18th Sun | Events |
|---|---|---|---|---|---|---|---|---|---|---|---|---|---|---|---|---|---|---|---|---|
| Ceremonies | | | OC | | | | | | | | | | | | | | | | CC | —N/a |
| Artistic skating | | | | | | | | ● | 3 | ● | 4 | ● | 4 | ● | 2 | 2 | 3 | 4 | | 22 |
| Inline downhill | | | | 2 | | 2 | | | | | | | | | | | | | | 4 |
| Inline freestyle | | | | | | | 5 | 5 | 8 | 4 | | | | | | | | | | 22 |
| Inline hockey | | | | ● | ● | ● | ● | ● | ● | 2 | | ● | ● | ● | ● | ● | ● | 2 | | 4 |
| Inline slalom | | | | | | | | | | | 4 | 4 | 4 | 2 | | | | | | 14 |
| Rink hockey | | | | | ● | ● | ● | ● | ● | ● | 2 | ● | ● | ● | ● | ● | ● | ● | 2 | 4 |
| Roller freestyle | Park | | | | | | | | | | | | | | ● | | ● | ● | 4 | 4 |
| Roller freestyle | Street | | | | | | ● | ● | 4 | | | | | | | | | | | 4 |
| Roller freestyle | Vert | ● | ● | 1 | | | | | | | | | | | | | | | | 1 |
| Scootering | Park | | | | | | | | | | | | | | | | | 3 | | 3 |
| Scootering | Street | | | | | | | | | | 3 | | | | | | | | | 3 |
| Skate cross | | | | 2 | 4 | | | | | | | | | | | | | | | 6 |
| Skateboarding | Slalom | | | | | | | | | | | | | | | 2 | 2 | 2 | | 6 |
| Skateboarding | Downhill | | | | 2 | 2 | | | | | | | | | | | | | | 4 |
| Skateboarding | Street luge | | | | 2 | 2 | | | | | | | | | | | | | | 4 |
| Skateboarding | Park | | | | | | ● | ● | ● | ● | 2 | | | | | | | | | 2 |
| Skateboarding | Street | | | | | | | | | | | | | | ● | ● | ● | ● | 2 | 2 |
| Skateboarding | Vert | ● | ● | 2 | | | | | | | | | | | | | | | | 2 |
| Speed | Track | | | | | | | | | | 8 | | 16 | | | | | | | 24 |
| Speed | Road | | | | | | | | | | | | | | 4 | 4 | | 4 | | 12 |
| Speed | Marathon | | | | | | | | | | | | | | | | | | 4 | 4 |
| Daily medal events | | 0 | 0 | 7 | 8 | 6 | 5 | 5 | 15 | 6 | 23 | 4 | 24 | 2 | 6 | 8 | 5 | 15 | 12 | 151 |
| Cumulative total | | 0 | 0 | 7 | 15 | 21 | 26 | 31 | 46 | 52 | 75 | 79 | 103 | 105 | 111 | 119 | 124 | 139 | 151 | 151 |
| Sports | | 1st Thu | 2nd Fri | 3rd Sat | 4th Sun | 5th Mon | 6th Tue | 7th Wed | 8th Thu | 9th Fri | 10th Sat | 11th Sun | 12th Mon | 13th Tue | 14th Wed | 15th Thu | 16th Fri | 17th Sat | 18th Sun | Total events |
| Sports | | October | | | | | | | | | | | | | | | | | | Total events |

== Medal table ==
* Host nation (Paraguay)

| Rank | Nation | Gold | Silver | Bronze | Total |
|---|---|---|---|---|---|
| 1 | Italy | 24 | 28 | 24 | 76 |
| 2 | Colombia | 22 | 16 | 9 | 47 |
| 3 | Spain | 17 | 18 | 11 | 46 |
| 4 | France | 16 | 15 | 10 | 41 |
| 5 | Chinese Taipei | 11 | 10 | 10 | 31 |
| 6 | United States | 7 | 9 | 9 | 25 |
| 7 | Russia | 7 | 3 | 7 | 17 |
| 8 | Germany | 7 | 2 | 2 | 11 |
| 9 | Brazil | 5 | 6 | 12 | 23 |
| 10 | Japan | 5 | 4 | 4 | 13 |
| 11 | Latvia | 3 | 2 | 4 | 9 |
| 11 | Portugal | 3 | 2 | 4 | 9 |
| 13 | Poland | 3 | 2 | 1 | 6 |
| 14 | Thailand | 3 | 0 | 1 | 4 |
| 15 | Czech Republic | 2 | 6 | 3 | 11 |
| 16 | Malaysia | 2 | 0 | 0 | 2 |
| 17 | India | 1 | 3 | 2 | 6 |
| 18 | Ecuador | 1 | 3 | 1 | 5 |
| 19 | Switzerland | 1 | 2 | 2 | 5 |
| 20 | Great Britain | 1 | 1 | 3 | 5 |
| 21 | Australia | 1 | 1 | 1 | 3 |
| 21 | El Salvador | 1 | 1 | 1 | 3 |
| 23 | Austria | 1 | 0 | 0 | 1 |
| 23 | Iran | 1 | 0 | 0 | 1 |
| 23 | Moldova | 1 | 0 | 0 | 1 |
| 23 | Netherlands | 1 | 0 | 0 | 1 |
| 27 | Argentina | 0 | 3 | 5 | 8 |
| 28 | Ukraine | 0 | 3 | 2 | 5 |
| 29 | Hong Kong | 0 | 2 | 1 | 3 |
| 30 | Chile | 0 | 1 | 4 | 5 |
| 31 | South Korea | 0 | 1 | 2 | 3 |
| 32 | Venezuela | 0 | 1 | 1 | 2 |
| 33 | Benin | 0 | 1 | 0 | 1 |
| 33 | Mexico | 0 | 1 | 0 | 1 |
| 35 | Slovakia | 0 | 0 | 3 | 3 |
| 36 | Senegal | 0 | 0 | 2 | 2 |
| 37 | Croatia | 0 | 0 | 1 | 1 |
| 37 | Finland | 0 | 0 | 1 | 1 |
| 37 | Guatemala | 0 | 0 | 1 | 1 |
| 37 | Kazakhstan | 0 | 0 | 1 | 1 |
| 37 | Paraguay* | 0 | 0 | 1 | 1 |
| 37 | San Marino | 0 | 0 | 1 | 1 |
| Totals (42 entries) | | 147 | 147 | 147 | 441 |

== Medalists ==
=== Artistic ===
| Event | Gold | Silver | Bronze |
|---|---|---|---|
| Men's inline | Yi-Fan Chen; Chinese Taipei | Elvis Martinello; Italy | Egor Tomilin; Russia |
| Women's inline | Sofia Ciacia; Italy | Clara Barattoni; Italy | Guiliana Scamarda; Argentina |
| Girl's inline | India Gonzalez; Spain | Giorgio Panebianco; Italy | Mariia Kapichnikova; Russia |
| Men's freeskating | Guillermo Gómez; Spain | Unai Cereijo; Spain | Erik Leite; Brazil |
| Women's freeskating | Madalena Costa; Portugal | Sira Bella; Spain | Elna Frances; Spain |
| Boys' freeskating | Joao Cruz; Portugal | Alessandro Costagliola; Italy | David Rama; Spain |
| Girls' freeskating | Victoria Baldo; Italy | Rita Azinheira; Portugal | Constanza Biondi; Italy |
| Senior couple dance | Italy; Gherardo Altieri; Roberta Sasso | Italy; Raoul Allegranti; Caterina Artoni | Colombia; Jeshua Folleco; Maria Muñoz |
| Junior couple dance | Italy; Luca Buonincontro; Ludovica Ambrosino | Italy; Alessandro Grossi; Carlotta Bruzzi | Portugal; Gonçalo Cunha; Maria Rita Gonçalves |
| Senior pairs | Italy; José Enrico Inglese; Angelica Polli | Italy; Tommaso Cortini; Micol Mills | Italy; Alessandro Bozzini; Gloria Di Bella |
| Junior pairs | Italy; Leonardo Malloggi; Maelle Milzi | Italy; Riccardo Nale; Martina Nale | Argentina; Alejo Castro; Rocio Parera |
| Men's solo dance | Brayan Carreño; Colombia | Facundo Nieva; Argentina | Yuri Allegranti; Italy |
| Women's solo dance | Roberta Sasso; Italy | Natalia Baldizzone; Spain | Gabriella Giraldi; Brazil |
| Boys' solo dance | Jeshua Folleco; Colombia | Luca Buonincontro; Italy | Felipe Tozato; Brazil |
| Girls' solo dance | Albina Kachur; Portugal | Ludovica Amrbosino; Italy | Mariaclaudia Parziale; Italy |
| Senior precision | Sincro Roller; Italy | Monza Precision Team; Italy | Roller Dreams; Argentina |
| Junior precision | Precision Skate Bologna; Italy | Royal Eagles; Italy | Roller Dreams; Argentina |
| Senior quartets | Vortex; Spain | Vento; Colombia | Neovis; Italy |
| Junior quartets | Magic Skate; Italy | Aria; Spain | CRSG; Brazil |
| Small groups open show | Club Patinatge Artistic Olot; Spain | Royal Eagles; Italy | CPA Tona; Spain |
| Large groups open show | Artistic Skating Cunit; Spain | CPA Tona; Spain | Evolution; Italy |
| Junior group show | Artistic Skating Cunit Jun; Spain | Skate Stars; Italy | Division JNR; Italy |

=== Inline downhill ===
| Event | Gold | | Silver | | Bronze | |
|---|---|---|---|---|---|---|
| Men's inline downhill time trial | Pablo Soler; Spain | 01:06.011 | Daniele Vecchi; Italy | 01:06.240 | Juan Agudelo; Colombia | 01:06.311 |
| Women's inline downhill time trial | Alef Torres; Colombia | 01:11.892 | Esmeralda Flores; Mexico | 01:12.379 | Danae Gómez; Chile | 01:12.795 |
| Men's inline downhill race | José Mejía; Colombia | | Juan Barrera; Colombia | | Carlos Quiroga; Colombia | |
| Women's inline downhill race | Alef Torres; Colombia | | Sabrina Vitarelli; Italy | | Danae Gómez; Chile | |

=== Inline freestyle ===
| Event | Gold | Silver | Bronze |
|---|---|---|---|
| Men's speed slalom | Kai-Wei Yang; Chinese Taipei | Pin-Ruei Huang; Chinese Taipei | Yu-Hsiang Cheng; Chinese Taipei |
| Women's speed slalom | Miao Man Huang; Chinese Taipei | YunFang Li; Chinese Taipei | Matilde Arosio; Italy |
| Boys' speed slalom | Hao-Yu Yang; Chinese Taipei | Manuel Moretti; Italy | Daniele Salzillo; Italy |
| Girls' speed slalom | Shih Ting Huang; Chinese Taipei | Shih-Ching Pang; Chinese Taipei | Chiu Chloe; Hong Kong |
| Team speed slalom | Chinese Taipei; Kai-Wei Yang; Yu-Hsiang Cheng; Miao Man Huang; YunFang Li; Yu-Chun Wang; Yu Chun Kuo | Italy; Manuel Moretti; Daniele Salzillo; Sveva Romano; Matilde Arosio; Gioele Zuliani; Ilaria D'Orsi | South Korea; Seyoon Jeong; Hasung Lee; Chaelim Kim; Jeongwon Hwang Yoonjin Park |
| Men's classic | Chou Po-wei; Chinese Taipei | Chen Chien-ting; Chinese Taipei | Pau Bosch Coll; Spain |
| Women's classic | Justyna Tęczar; Poland | An-Yu Hou; Chinese Taipei | Tz Yu Fan; Chinese Taipei |
| Boys' classic | Kamin Inswang; Thailand | Roman Shchapov; Russia | Semen Mikhailov; Russia |
| Girls' classic | Sofia Anisimova; Russia | Yuet Yi Li; Hong Kong | Margarita Komarovskaia; Russia |
| Open pair | Russia; Roman Shchapov; Margarita Komarovskaia | Chinese Taipei; Chien Ting Chen; Chun-Yen Hou | Thailand; Natnanda Pasutanavin; Kamin Inswang |
| Men's free jump | Gianmarco Savi; Italy | Mouhawya Salifou; Benin | Ousseynou Diene; Senegal |
| Women's free jump | Francesca Brivio; Italy | Alena Efimova; Russia | Mayrin Burasovitch; France |
| Boys' free jump | Maxim Caraion; Moldova | Julian Fernandez-Campon Navarro; Spain | Nazar Portianko; Ukraine |
| Girls' free jump | Veronika Zherelnikova; Russia | Emilie Bellanger; France | Polina Zelenokhat; Ukraine |
| Men's slides | Viritpol Vongaukayakorn; Thailand | Enrique Rubio Mesas; Spain | Anvar Akylbekov; Kazakhstan |
| Women's slides | Anna Kukushkina; Russia | Sofiia Kytai Hora; Ukraine | Alena Efimova; Russia |
| Boys' slides | Liao Yu De; Chinese Taipei | Mykhailo Teterin; Ukraine | Tommaso Terenzi; San Marino |
| Girls' slides | Uliana Dudina; Russia | Marusia Pohuliaka; Ukraine | Liu Chen Yu; Chinese Taipei |
| Men's battle | Pavel Matveev; Russia | Chen Chien Ting; Chinese Taipei | Lorenzo Demuru; Italy |
| Women's battle | Justyna Tęczar; Poland | Alexandra Muntean; Spain | Hou An Yu; Chinese Taipei |
| Boys' battle | Kamin Inswang; Thailand | Roman Shchapov; Russia | Adrian Sebastian Gimenez; Russia |
| Girls' battle | Sofia Anisimova; Russia | Li Yuet Yi; Hong Kong | Margarita Komarovskaia; Russia |

=== Inline hockey ===
| Event | Gold | Silver | Bronze |
|---|---|---|---|
| Men's tournament | France; Karl Gabillet; Illan Farmer; Angus Venin; Leo Gricourt; Antoine Rage; Adrien Romanaz; Guillaume Ramaye; Louis Allo; Léon Le Bohellec; Bastien Chaumet; Jules Caillat; Antoine Rayapin; Maxime Langlois; Matheo Candellier-Brohon; Marius Godano; Alex Gauze | Czech Republic; Albert Bares; Pavel Strycek; Jakub Bernad; Petr Skoloud; Jan Andrysek; Martin Altrichter; Daniel Brabec; Matej Strnadek; Kvasnicka Matej; Jan Vyoral; Mikulas Skoupy; Marek Loskot; Adam Přibyl; Jakub Novak; Lukas Novak | United States; Nick DellaMorte; Scott Savage; Itan Chavira; Corey Hodge; Nathan Sigmund; Charles Vaughan; Tyler Kraft; Michael Maczynski; Kyle Mooney; Keith Johnson; Maxwell Halvorsen; Kyle Novak; William Pascalli; Kevin Mooney |
| Women's tournament | Spain; María Sierra; Alejandra Alfonso; Andrea Sehuk; Inee Ruiz; Lucía Moreno; Mercè Vilaró; Blanca López; Náyade Rodríguez; Ana Sierra; Celia Moya; Judit Pareja; Tamara Vaidean; Laura López; Olivia Monjas; Ainara Carranza; Alejandra Vallejo | France; Marion Demars; Coleen Martinez; Lilou France; Pauline Bernard; Miranda Alcaraz; Léna Rault; Nelly Kivinen; Chloé Joly-Vuillemin; Elise Boyard; Zoé Castillo; Charlotte Chantre; Marina Corbeil; Alexandra Vaulot; Sarah Vaulot; Laurine Cruaud | United States; Miranda Lemus; Tanner Gates; Kylie Brown; Laura Veharanta; Jamie Dunn; Bailey Bennett; Chloe Sapra; Samantha Phelan; Makenzie Williams; Jolee Savoy; Natasha Pascalli; Sophia Szelag; Allison Era; Tia Stoddard; Kayla Demint; Jeays Matz |
| Boys' tournament | Italy; Mattia Guerriero; Giampaolo Bastianoni; Riccardo Gloder; Mattia Grandelli; Mattia Marchet; Emanuel Mendola; Leo Lazzari; Riccardo Quartuccio; Mattia Albanti; Leonardo De Angelis; Angelo Bonsu; Emanuele Corazzari; Lorenzo Mariani; Ruggero Meconi | France; Hugo Montaclair; Pablo Roblin—Zumpe; Soren Oudar; Lucas Aphecetche; Leandro Halm; Loane Volsan; Julien Cottiaux; Antonin Faurite; Axel Boisseau; Arthur Valognes; Gauthier Molina; Gaëtan Courtois; Pierre Mettier; Glenn Venin | Spain; Bruno Barquero; Jorge Albi; Arturo Contreras; Javier del Pozo; Guillem Cortés; Samuel Cidade; Pablo Iglesias; Aitor Markiegi; Pol Olivera; Gottis Melero; Daniel Pérez; Toni Bande; Adrián Melchor; Mario Van Gool; Leonardo Mas Lu; Alex Domínguez |
| Girls' tournament | Spain; Yaiza Camacho; Ainara Fariña; Naiara Guaita; Inés Carrasco; Mar Álvarez Inee Ruiz; Ariadna Ayelo; Laia Roig; Núria Enrich; Martina de la Cruz; Sara Melgar; Irati González; Celia Moya; Iris Resina; Julia Marcet; Daniela de la Cruz | United States; April Mittnacht; Aubrey Jones; Adelynn Finke; Claire Martincic; Makenzie Williams; Allison Mittnacht; Emmersyn Finke; Haley Hasbargen; Mia Hasbargen; Eliana Marr; Kira Tocco; Maiya Birdsall; Charlotte Mollman; Lilli Christiansen | Colombia; Maira Álvarez; Juana Sánchez; Liz Villalobos; Gabriela Ruiz; Nayla Araujo; Maria Céspedes; Isabella Vivas; Catalina Castellanos; María Montaño; Maria Lucio; Manuela Ruiz; Natalia Galindo; Sara Murgueitio |

=== Inline slalom ===
| Event | Gold | Silver | Bronze |
|---|---|---|---|
| Men's giant | Sergio Menéndez; Spain | Mattia Pe; Italy | David Fiorot; Italy |
| Women's giant | Lorenza Cesaris; Italy | Elea Börsig; Germany | Marta Tomšić; Croatia |
| Boys' giant | Karol Kaczmarczyk; Poland | Tomoya Hashimoto; Japan | Marcos Arias; Spain |
| Girls' giant | Luna Schwarz; Germany | Sofía Álvarez; Spain | Giulia Gamba; Poland |
| Team giant | Germany; Elea Börsig; Luca Gökeler; Luna Schwarz; Noah Sing | Italy; Lorenza Cesaris; Giulia Gamba; Cristian Rondi; Mattia Pe | Spain; Sofía Álvarez; Marcos Arias; Brugues Grau; Sergio Menéndez |
| Men's slalom | Noah Sing; Germany | Sergio Menéndez; Spain | Mattia Pe; Italy |
| Women's slalom | Elea Börsig; Germany | Gabriela Möllerova; Czech Republic | Lenka Keselá; Slovakia |
| Boys' slalom | Jakub Matoušek; Czech Republic | Jaromir Nosek; Czech Republic | Filip Schvarc; Slovakia |
| Girls' slalom | Luna Schwarz; Germany | Gabriela Zawisza; Poland | Mata Blättler; Switzerland |
| Team slalom | Germany; Elea Börsig; Luca Gökeler; Luna Schwarz; Noah Sing | Italy; Lorenza Cesaris; David Fiorot; Elisa Negrinelli; Mattia Pe | Spain; Sofía Álvarez; Marcos Arias; Brugues Grau; Sergio Menéndez |
| Men's combined | Cristian Rondi; Italy | Mattia Pe; Italy | Noah Sing; Germany |
| Women's combined | Lorenza Cesaris; Italy | Elea Börsig; Germany | Lenka Keselá; Slovakia |
| Boys' combined | Marcos Arias; Spain | Tomoya Hashimoto; Japan | Jaromir Nosek; Czech Republic |
| Girls' combined | Luna Schwarz; Germany | Sofía Álvarez; Spain | Giulia Gamba; Italy |

=== Rink hockey ===
| Event | Gold | Silver | Bronze |
|---|---|---|---|
| Men's tournament | France; Pedro Chambel; Stanislas Vankammelbecke; Bruno Di Benedetto; Remi Herman; Anthony Da Costa; Roberto Di Benedetto; Marc Rouzé; Nathan Gefflot; Carlo Di Benedetto; Tom Savreux | Argentina; Constantino Acevedo; Matías Pascual; Tomás Mena; Lucas Ordoñez; Danilo Rampulla; Bautista Acevedo; Lucas Martínez; Facundo Navarro; Franco Platero; Juan Cruz; Facundo Bridge; Gonzalo Romero | Portugal; Pedro Henriques; José Miranda; Rafael Moreira; João Rodrigues; Carlos Ramos; Luis Querido; Miguel Rocha; Alejandro Edo; Gonçalo Alves; Helder Nunes |
| Women's tournament | Spain; Anna Ferrer; Sara Roces; Gemma Solé; Aina Florenza; Marta González; Mariona Colomer; María Sanjurjo; Aimee Blackman; Victòria Porta; Elsa Salvanyà; Anna Salvat; Carla Batlle | Argentina; Gimena Gómez; Valentina Fernández; Lourdes Lampasona; Julieta Fernández; Luciana Agudo; Adriana Soto; María Felamini; María Guzzo; Ana Maldonado; Natalia Jara; Pilar Abaid; Paula Luján | Italy; Ludovica Rossetto; Sofia Bertinato; Laura Rubega; Pamela Lapolla; Anna Orsato; Elena Tamiozzo; Verónica Caretta; Emma Cazzola; Giorgia Meneghello; Luisa Lamacchia; Matilde Ghirardello; Stella Rossato |
| Men's intercontinental tournament | Austria; Alexander Prutsch; Tobias Winsauer; Aurel Zehrer; Elias Mark; Kilian Hagspiel; Luis Calvin; Tobias Kirchberger; Daniel Zehrer; Kilian Laritz; Abraao Gomes | Colombia; Camilo Mora; Miguel Vásquez; Felipe Agudelo; Samuel Correa; Juan Aristizabal; Santiago Gutiérrez; Samuel Villa; Manuel Bautista; Luis Gutiérrez; Oscar Pataquiva; Esteban Gallego; Juan Canizales | Brazil; Aurelio Rieger; Rafael Novaes; Pierri Gil; Diego Dias; Jurandyr Da Silva; Everton Paulino; Leonardo Sant Anna; João Costa; Kleber Gembre; Gabriel Macedo; Derivaldo Neto |
| Boys' tournament | Spain; Biel Uberni; Nicolás Sama; Genís Costa; Ishak Bouda; Pol Anglada; Hugo Mareque; Marc Orus; Oriol Castro; Joel Milà; Marti Palleja | Portugal; João Antunes; Afonso Figueiredo; Martim Nunes; Gonçalo Leal; João Maria; André Araújo; Tomás Almeida; Francisco Pinto; Vasco Moreira; Bruno Torres | Argentina; Bautista Tussedo; Benjamín Bailon; Nicolás Alonzo; Valentín Funes; Alejo Espinoza; Joaquín Morales; Charbel Fraifer; Tiziano Ramírez; Martino Mercado; Renzo Ferrer; Bautista Romero; Lucas Sottano |

=== Roller freestyle ===
| Event | Gold | Silver | Bronze |
|---|---|---|---|
| Men's street | Leonardo Cardoso; Brazil | Danilo Senna; Brazil | Nils Jansons; Latvia |
| Women's street | Caria Pasquinelli; France | Nicoly Machado; Brazil | Laura Brito; Brazil |
| Boy's street | Anthony Santa Fé; Brazil | Michał Szmigiel; Poland | Lago Bocardi; Brazil |
| Girl's street | Nicolly Ribas; Brazil | Rafael Reis; Brazil | Joana Melo; Brazil |
| Women's vert | Sorachi Kawasaki; Japan | Ayumi Kayaki; Japan | Ana Júlia Da Silva; Brazil |
| Men's park | Lenny Jourda; France | Léo Fumery; France | Julien Cudot; France |
| Women's park | Ana Júlia Da Silva; Brazil | Carla Martín; Spain | Mei Myoga; Japan |
| Boys' park | Élio Sala-Naessens; France | Théo Nascimento; Brazil | Arthur Bandeira; Brazil |
| Girls' park | Joana Melo; Brazil | Rafaela Reis; Brazil | Allison Arostegui; Italy |

=== Scootering ===
| Event | Gold | Silver | Bronze |
|---|---|---|---|
| Men's street | Jack Walsh; United States | Leonard Bometon; France | Lucas Di Meglio; France |
| Women's street | Romane Gilliet; France | Joséphine Zgorski; France | Sophie Molyneux; Great Britain |
| Junior mixed street | Jake Roll; United States | Stefano Marzella; Italy | Ambroise Acher; France |
| Men's park | Jayden Sharman; Great Britain | Matěj Pekárek; Czech Republic | Harvey Perkins; Great Britain |
| Women's park | Chanel Martin; United States | Beca Ortiz; United States | Neve Entwistle; Great Britain |
| Junior mixed park | Andrea Gauduel; France | Jehiel Duran; Spain | Max Geront; Finland |

=== Skate cross ===
| Event | Gold | Silver | Bronze |
|---|---|---|---|
| Men's | Mael Roudaut; France | Cyril Champagne; France | Dame Fall; Senegal |
| Women's | Ludovica Rimondi; Italy | Marie Lecomte; France | Matilde Arosio; Italy |
| Boys' | Adonis Vicq; France | Mohamed-Amine Lellouchi; France | Antonio Paoletta; Italy |
| Girls' | Noélie Gontier; France | Céleste Grenon-Granger; France | Uliana Dudina; Russia |
| Men's team | France; Oscar Briex; Cyril Champagne; Mael Roudaut | France; Adonis Vicq; Mohamed-Amine Lellouchi | Italy; Luca Borromeo; Antonio Paoletta |
| Women's team | Italy; Matilde Arosio; Alice Delfino; Ludovica Rimondi | France; Ornella Faria; Mayrin Burasovitch; Marie Lecomte | France; Céleste Grenon-Granger; Noélie Gontier |

=== Skateboarding ===
| Event | Gold | | Silver | | Bronze | |
|---|---|---|---|---|---|---|
| Men's giant slalom | Collin Kruse; United States | | Petr Martinů; Czech Republic | | Artūrs Liskovs; Latvia | |
| Women's giant slalom | Lynn Kramer; United States | | Eliška Stránská; Czech Republic | | Sarah Byrd; United States | |
| Men's hybrid slalom | Jānis Kuzmins; Latvia | | Toms Dreiblats; Latvia | | Gustavs Gailitis; Latvia | |
| Women's hybrid slalom | Dominika Ozolina; Latvia | | Lynn Kramer; United States | | Emily Martinú; Czech Republic | |
| Men's tight slalom | Jānis Kuzmins; Latvia | | Gustavs Gailitis; Latvia | | Toms Dreiblats; Latvia | |
| Women's tight slalom | Emily Martinú; Czech Republic | | Leiola Kahaku; United States | | Lynn Kramer; United States | |
| Men's downhill skateboarding time trial | Adrien Paynel; France | 01:05.328 | Andréas Bouclier; France | 01:05.711 | Albert Fores; Spain | 01:05.896 |
| Women's downhill skateboarding time trial | Selina Theiler; Switzerland | 01:09.854 | Livia Waldburger; Switzerland | 01:11.198 | Giulia Bottazzin; Italy | 01:11.365 |
| Men's downhill skateboarding race | Harry Clarke; Australia | | Antoine Carlotti; France | | Adrien Paynel; France | |
| Women's downhill skateboarding race | Lisa Peters; Netherlands | | Selina Theiler; Switzerland | | Livia Waldburger; Switzerland | |
| Men's street luge time trial | Abdil Mahdzan; Malaysia | 01:07.611 | Mikel Echegaray; Spain | 01:08.297 | Andy Lally; United States | 01:08.792 |
| Women's street luge time trial | Loreline Pastor; France | 01:11.754 | Sabrina Riffenburgh; United States | 01:14.366 | Samantha Marsteller; United States | 01:16.132 |
| Men's street luge race | Abdil Mahdzan; Malaysia | | Mikel Echegaray; Spain | | Andy Lally; United States | |
| Women's street luge race | Loreline Pastor; France | | Samantha Marsteller; United States | | Sabrina Riffenburgh; United States | |
| Men's park | Egoitz Bijueska; Spain | | Tom Schaar; United States | | Gui Khury; Brazil | |
| Women's park | Mizuho Hasegawa; Japan | | Sky Brown; Great Britain | | Cocona Hiraki; Japan | |
| Men's street | Ginwoo Onodera; Japan | | Juni Kang; South Korea | | Taiga Nagai; Japan | |
| Women's street | Yumeka Oda; Japan | | Chloe Covell; Australia | | Coco Yoshizawa; Japan | |
| Men's vert | Justin-Daniel Sánchez; United States | | Guilherme Khury; Brazil | | Hudson Walker; Australia | |
| Women's vert | Mizuho Hasegawa; Japan | | Shuka Kawai; Japan | | Helena Laurino; Brazil | |

=== Speed ===
==== Track ====
| Event | Gold | | Silver | | Bronze | |
|---|---|---|---|---|---|---|
| Men's 200 m dual time trial | Santiago Vásquez; Colombia | 17.133 | Jhoan Guzmán; Spain | 17.215 | Jhon Tascón; Colombia | 17.287 |
| Women's 200 m dual time trial | Kollin Castro; Colombia | 18.425 | Geiny Pajaro; Colombia | 18.429 | Ivonne Nochez; El Salvador | 18.615 |
| Boys' 200 m dual time trial | Emanuel Ramos; Colombia | 17.615 | Anirudhan Vinod; India | 17.658 | Chaung Wei-Ning; Chinese Taipei | 17.718 |
| Girls' 200 m dual time trial | Sofia Chiumiento; Italy | 18.450 | Mariana Ambuila; Colombia | 18.617 | Gisell Caicedo; Colombia | 18.623 |
| Men's 5000 m points race | Hugo Morin; France | | Francisco Peula; Spain | | Chia-Cheng Tseng; Chinese Taipei | |
| Women's 5000 m points race | Gabriela Rueda; Colombia | | Camila Carreño; Chile | | Corinne Stoddard; United States | |
| Boys' 5000 m points race | Pan Cheng-Yu; Chinese Taipei | | Johan Poildessous; France | | Joaquín Loyola; Ecuador | |
| Girls' 5000 m points race | Mariana Imitola; Colombia | | Manuela Rodríguez; Colombia | | Jeon Yeseul; South Korea | |
| Men's 10000 m elimination race | Martin Ferrie; France | | Daniel Niero; Italy | | Miguel Bravo; Portugal | |
| Women's 10000 m elimination race | Gabriela Rueda; Colombia | | Gabriela Vargas; Ecuador | | Alison Bernardi; France | |
| Boys' 10000 m elimination race | Giorgio Ghisio; Italy | | Jerónimo Sánchez; Colombia | | Johan Poildessous; France | |
| Girls' 10000 m elimination race | Manuela Rodríguez; Colombia | | Mariana Imitola; Colombia | | Mailliw Rojas; Venezuela | |
| Men's 1000 m sprint tournament | Duccio Marsili; Italy | 1:21.918 | AnandKumar Velkumar; India | 1:21.922 | Chia-Cheng Tseng; Chinese Taipei | 1:22.343 |
| Women's 1000 m sprint tournament | Kollin Castro; Colombia | 1:27.882 | Corinne Stoddard; United States | 1:28.180 | Catalina Lorca; Chile | 1:28.327 |
| Boys' 1000 m sprint tournament | Giorgio Ghisio; Italy | 1:24.815 | Chuang Wei-Ning; Chinese Taipei | 1:24.939 | Rafael Silva; Portugal | 1:25.800 |
| Girls' 1000 m sprint tournament | Sofia Chiumiento; Italy | 1:28.188 | Manuela Saldarriaga; Colombia | 1:29.159 | Yan Wan-Xin; Chinese Taipei | 1:29.179 |
| Men's 3000 m relay race | Spain; Francisco Peula; Manuel Taibo; Jhoan Guzman | 3:56.097 | Colombia; Juan Mantilla; Santiago Vásquez; Jhon Tascón; Kevin Lenis | 3:56.325 | Chinese Taipei; Cheng Hsuan Tsai; Chen-Yu Wen; Li-Yang Kuo; Chia-Cheng Tseng | 3:56.493 |
| Women's 3000 m relay race | Colombia; Yicel Giraldo; Gabriela Rueda; Maria Alzate; Kollin Castro | 4:11.191 | Chinese Taipei; Yi Hsuan Liu; Yun-Cheng Lee; Pei-Yu Shih; Meng-Chu Li | 4:11.241 | France; Aubane Plouhinec; Alison Bernardi; Marine Lefeuvre; Manon Fraboulet | 4:13.260 |
| Boys' 3000 m relay race | Chinese Taipei; Guan-Lin Wu; Yu-Chen Li; Kai-En Chen; Wei-Ning Chuang | 4:00.614 | Colombia; Juan Silva; Jerónimo Sánchez; Tomás Moncada; Juan Manuel Chaux | 4:01.066 | Czech Republic; Jáchym Podlipský; Vojtěch Vrba; Tobiáš Krupka | 4:03.453 |
| Girls' 3000 m relay race | Colombia; Manuela Rodriguez; Manuela Saldarriaga; Mariana Bonet; Gisell Caicedo | 4:22.116 | Ecuador; Ambar León; Elisa Sala; Arianna Zuñiga | 4:25.889 | India; Lakshitha Kumar; Pragathi Sivabalan; Charita Sri Mandepudi; Rutva Prakash | 4:34.659 |
| Men's 500 m + distance sprint tournament | Jhon Tascón; Colombia | 40.813 | Jhoan Guzmán; Spain | 40.853 | AnandKumar Velkumar; India | 40.856 |
| Women's 500 m + distance sprint tournament | Sara Muñoz; Colombia | 43.496 | Liu Yi Hsuan; Chinese Taipei | 43.837 | Manon Fraboulet; France | 44.203 |
| Boys' 500 m + distance sprint tournament | Chuang Wei-Ning; Chinese Taipei | 41.215 | Edoardo Abis; Italy | 42.355 | Juan Silva; Colombia | 42.383 |
| Girls' 500 m + distance sprint tournament | Gisell Caicedo; Colombia | 43.845 | Sofia Chiumiento; Italy | 44.359 | Manuela Saldarriaga; Colombia | 44.377 |

==== Road ====
| Event | Gold | | Silver | | Bronze | |
|---|---|---|---|---|---|---|
| Men's -1 lap sprint tournament | Jhoan Guzmán; Spain | 29.591 | Jacob Melton; United States | 29.759 | Vincenzo Maiorca; Italy | 29.937 |
| Women's -1 lap sprint tournament | Ivonne Nochez; El Salvador | 31.405 | Kollin Castro; Colombia | 31.745 | Asia Negri; Italy | 31.768 |
| Boys' -1 lap sprint tournament | Anirudhan Vinod; India | 30.394 | Lohnath Arunprasath; India | 30.419 | Niklas Kubik; Germany | 30.782 |
| Girls' -1 lap sprint tournament | Alicia McBride; United States | 31.951 | Sofia Chiumiento; Italy | 32.286 | Manuela Saldarriaga; Colombia | 32.431 |
| Men's 15000 m elimination race | Kevin Lenis; Colombia | | Juan Mantilla; Colombia | | Julio Mirena; Paraguay | |
| Women's 15000 m elimination race | Gabriela Vargas; Ecuador | | Gabriela Rueda; Colombia | | Shih Pei-Yu; Chinese Taipei | |
| Boys' 15000 m elimination race | Juan Manuel Chaux; Colombia | | Joaquín Loyola; Ecuador | | Lucas Beroiza; Chile | |
| Girls' 15000 m elimination race | Mariana Imitola; Colombia | | Charly Alviarez; Venezuela | | Carla Plana; Spain | |
| Men's 100 m sprint tournament | Jhoan Guzmán; Spain | 9.467 | Vincenzo Maiorca; Italy | 9.520 | Feberson Bonilla; Guatemala | 9.732 |
| Women's 100 m sprint tournament | Geiny Pajaro; Colombia | 10.507 | Ivonne Nochez; El Salvador | 10.713 | Asia Negri; Italy | 10.496 |
| Boys' 100 m sprint tournament | Amirmahdi Yahaghi; Iran | 10.063 | Emanuel Ramos; Colombia | 10.100 | Edoardo Abis; Italy | 10.113 |
| Girls' 100 m sprint tournament | Sofia Chiumiento; Italy | 10.683 | Gisell Caicedo; Colombia | 10.724 | Vittoria Andreetta; Italy | 10.959 |
| Men's master marathon | [[|]] | | [[|]] | | [[|]] | |
| Women's master marathon | [[|]] | | [[|]] | | [[|]] | |
| Men's pro marathon | [[|]] | | [[|]] | | [[|]] | |
| Women's pro marathon | [[|]] | | [[|]] | | [[|]] | |
