= India at the 2026 World Skate Games =

- Flag of India
- IOC code: IND
- NOC: Skate India
- Website: indiaskate.com

in Asunción, Paraguay 2 October 2026 – 18 October 2026
- Competitors: 64 (40 men and 24 women) in 5 sports
- Medals Ranked 5th: Gold 2 Silver 3 Bronze 2 Total 7

India competed at the 2026 World Skate Games in Asunción, Paraguay, from 2 to 18 October 2026, with a contingent managed by Skate India (Roller Skating Federation of India) after finalizing their roster with standby skaters.

India achieved a historic performance with a record haul of 7 medals (2 gold, 3 silver, 2 bronze), finishing 5th in the overall global speed skating rankings, highlighted by Anand Kumar Velkumar's senior men's marathon gold.

== Medalists ==
Medal	Name	Event
Gold	Anand Kumar Velkumar	Senior men's marathon
Gold	Anirudhan Vinod	Junior men's 1 lap
Silver	Anand Kumar Velkumar	Senior men's 1000m
Silver	Anirudhan Vinod	Junior men's 200m dual time trial
Silver	Lohnath Arun Prasath	Junior men's 1 lap
Bronze	Anand Kumar Velkumar	Senior men's 500m +D
Bronze	Lakshitha R S Rutva Prakash; Pragathi Sivabalan; Charita Sri Mandepudi	Junior women's 3000m relay

== Competitors ==
The following is the list of the number of competitors participating at the Games per sport/discipline based on the final contingent lists.

Sport	Men	Women	Total
Inline freestyle	6	5	11
Inline hockey	21	15	36
Rink hockey	12	9	21
Skateboarding	1	0	1
Speed skating	14	9	23
Total	54	38	92

Note: The table above displays the total number of entries per sport. Because several athletes competed in multiple disciplines (such as inline freestyle and slalom events) or crossed over between junior and senior divisions in team tournaments, the absolute number of unique individual competitors representing India at the Games is lower than the aggregate sport total.

== Inline freestyle ==
India qualified its inline freestyle skaters to compete across various disciplines based on the official final roster selections.

=== Speed slalom ===
Key:

- Q BT = Best time in qualification round
- KO BT = Best time in the knockout rounds

Athlete	Category	Q BT	KO BT	Rank
Nanal Jinesh	Senior Men	4.482	5.353	10
Bamane Deven	Senior Men	4.601	5.882	11
Ananya Ananya	Senior Women	4.725	5.515	8
Rajasekaran Sarvesh	Junior Men	4.236	—	11
Kumar Arnav	Junior Men	4.294	—	13
Amarnath Arya Samuel	Junior Men	5.080	—	17
Mishra Anahita	Junior Women	4.806	5.651	12
Mukkala Nainika	Junior Women	4.890	5.934	16
Joshi Swarali	Junior Women	5.043	—	17

=== Classic ===
Athlete	Category	Rank
Nanal Jinesh	Senior Men	11
Joshi Shreyasi	Senior Women	8
Dugad Purab	Junior Men	7
Venkatesh Samvit	Junior Men	8
Sipanapaku Sipakasaiku	Junior Men	13
Joshi Swarali	Junior Women	11
Bandakka Siri Vinay	Junior Women	16
Mane Savnee	Junior Women	20

=== Pair classic ===
Athletes	Category	Rank
Joshi Swarali; Joshi Shreyasi	Open Pairs	4

=== Slides ===
Athlete	Category	Rank
Nanal Jinesh	Senior Men	11
Mukkala Nainika	Junior Women	9

=== Battle ===
Athlete	Category	Rank
Nanal Jinesh	Senior Men	17
Joshi Shreyasi	Senior Women	7
Venkatesh Samvit	Junior Men	9
Dugad Purab	Junior Men	9
Sipanapaku Sipakasaiku	Junior Men	19
Bandakka Siri Vinay	Junior Women	5
Joshi Swarali	Junior Women	13
Mane Savnee	Junior Women	24

== Inline slalom ==
Indian skaters competed in the inline slalom events, completing timed runs across junior and senior divisions.

Athlete	Category	Time	Rank
B Manoj Karthik	Senior Men	1:22.26	14
Senthilkumar Gowtham	Senior Men	Disqualified	18
Naveena P	Senior Women	1:45.03	9
X Monic	Junior Men	1:22.45	7
Mendake Sairaj	Junior Men	1:36.42	8
Aj Ahalya	Junior Women	Disqualified	8
R Khrissika	Junior Women	Disqualified	9
Mallareddy Aishwarya	Junior Women	Disqualified	10

== Skateboarding ==
Indian skateboarders entered qualification flights for the street discipline circuits based on the final selections.

=== Street ===
==== Senior Men ====
Rank	Athlete	Score	Round
74	Sarkar Yoshiro	25.06	Qualifier

== Speed skating ==
Indian speed skaters competed in track sprinting disciplines at the venues in Asunción.

=== Track ===
==== 200m dual time trial ====
Athlete	Category	Time	Rank	Notes
Raj Anish	Senior Men	18.228	28	
Sirohi Ayush	Senior Men	18.574	35	
Abna Ambily Nivas Ajayakumar	Senior Women	19.737	21	
S Gopika	Senior Women	20.078	25	
Vinod Anirudhan	Junior Men	17.658	Silver	
Arunprasath Lohnath	Junior Men	18.175	13	
P S Srinithi	Junior Women	20.370	19	
Prakash Rutva	Junior Women	20.768	25	

==== 1000m sprint tournament ====
Athlete	Category	Time	Rank	Notes
Velkumar AnandKumar	Senior Men	1:21.922	Silver	
Iyappan Balaram	Senior Men	1:24.382	39	
Sadhu Heeral	Senior Women	1:27.508	20	
Abna Ambily Nivas Ajayakumar	Senior Women	1:29.869	31	
Arunprasath Lohnath	Junior Men	1:23.722	25	
Sadhu Himnish	Junior Men	1:26.178	33	
Prakash Rutva	Junior Women	1:30.534	17	
Sivabalan Pragathi	Junior Women	1:34.267	34	

==== 5000m points race ====
Athlete	Category	Rank
Prasath Vishnu	Senior Men	36
Goraya Arnav	Senior Men	40
Concessao Dashiel	Senior Women	30
Iniyan Ilampirai	Junior Men	27
Verma Aaryav	Junior Men	37
Ranjith Kumar Sindhu Lakshitha	Junior Women	12
Sivabalan Pragathi	Junior Women	15

==== 10000m elimination race ====
Athlete	Category	Rank
Velkumar AnandKumar	Senior Men	14
Goraya Arnav	Senior Men	37
S Gopika	Senior Women	32
Concessao Dashiel	Senior Women	35
Verma Aaryav	Junior Men	27
Iniyan Ilampirai	Junior Men	32
Sivabalan Pragathi	Junior Women	11
Mandepudi Charita Sri	Junior Women	18

==== 3000m relay race ====
Athletes	Category	Time	Rank
Vinod Anirudhan; Iniyan Ilampirai; Sadhu Himnish; Arunprasath Lohnath	Junior Men	4:03.754	7
Ranjith Kumar Sindhu Lakshitha; Sivabalan Pragathi; Mandepudi Charita Sri; Prakash Rutva	Junior Women	4:34.659	Bronze
Prasath Vishnu; Velkumar Anandkumar; Iyappan Balaram; Goraya Arnav	Senior Men	4:12.231	13
Concessao Dashiel; S Gopika; Abna Ambily Nivas Ajayakumar; Sadhu Heeral	Senior Women	Disqualified	10

==== 500 M +D sprint tournament ====
Athlete	Category	Time	Rank
Vinod Anirudhan	Junior Men	42.308	7
Sadhu Himnish	Junior Men	44.409	27
Prakash Rutva	Junior Women	45.978	8
P S Srinithi	Junior Women	47.996	23
Velkumar AnandKumar	Senior Men	40.856	Bronze
Iyappan Balaram	Senior Men	41.913	29
Abna Ambily Nivas Ajayakumar	Senior Women	45.221	23
Sadhu Heeral	Senior Women	46.616	27

=== Road ===
==== 1-lap sprint tournament ====
Athlete	Category	Time	Rank
Vinod Anirudhan	Junior Men	30.394	Gold
Arunprasath Lohnath	Junior Men	30.419	Silver
P S Srinithi	Junior Women	33.932	6
Prakash Rutva	Junior Women	32.872	16
Sirohi Ayush	Senior Men	31.811	14
Raj Anish	Senior Men	31.796	24
Concessao Dashiel	Senior Women	34.815	15

==== 15000m elimination race ====
Athlete	Category	Rank
Verma Aaryav	Junior Men	15
Iniyan Ilampirai	Junior Men	19
Ranjith Kumar Sindhu Lakshitha	Junior Women	8
Sivabalan Pragathi	Junior Women	17
Prasath Vishnu	Senior Men	26
Velkumar AnandKumar	Senior Men	30
Concessao Dashiel	Senior Women	18
Sadhu Heeral	Senior Women	19

==== 100m sprint tournament ====
Athlete	Category	Time	Rank
Vinod Anirudhan	Junior Men	10.175	5
Arunprasath Lohnath	Junior Men	10.617	15
P S Srinithi	Junior Women	11.941	23
Sirohi Ayush	Senior Men	10.492	23
Raj Anish	Senior Men	10.535	26
Abna Ambily Nivas Ajayakumar	Senior Women	11.426	17

==== Marathon ====
Athlete	Category	Time	Rank	Notes
Velkumar Anandkumar	Pro Men	1:01:59.102	Gold	
Verma Aaryav	Pro Men	1:07:23.068	51	
Goraya Arnav	Pro Men	1:12:37.793	75	
Sadhu Himnish	Pro Men	1:14:00.605	78	
Arunprasath Lohnath	Pro Men	1:14:00.825	79	
Prasath Vishnu	Pro Men	1:18:33.180	86	
Sirohi Ayush	Pro Men	—	DNF	
Iniyan Ilampirai	Pro Men	—	DNF	
Iyappan Balaram	Pro Men	—	DNF	
Vinod Anirudhan	Pro Men	—	DNS	
Raj Anish	Pro Men	—	DNS	
Ranjith Kumar Sindhu Lakshitha	Pro Women	1:11:17.497	35	
S Gopika	Pro Women	1:21:26.111	61	
Sivabalan Pragathi	Pro Women	1:26:49.744	75	
P S Srinithi	Pro Women	1:45:00.205	82	
Mandepudi Charita Sri	Pro Women	—	DNF	
Prakash Rutva	Pro Women	—	DNF	
Abna Ambily Nivas Ajayakumar	Pro Women	—	DNS	

== Inline hockey ==
India qualified its junior men's national inline hockey team based on continental ranking metrics to participate in the tournament.

=== Junior men's tournament ===
==== Group D standings ====
The top three teams from the group stage advanced to the Round of 16, while India proceeded to the classification placement bracket.

Pos	Team	Pld	W	OTW	OTL	L	GF	GA	GD	Pts	Qualification
1	Germany	3	3	0	0	0	13	4	+9	9	Advanced to Round of 16
2	Argentina	3	2	0	0	1	19	6	+13	6	Advanced to Round of 16
3	South Korea	3	1	0	0	2	11	17	−6	3	Advanced to Round of 16
4	India	3	0	0	0	3	8	24	−16	0	Advanced to Placement round

==== Matches ====
Date	Time	Round	Team 1	Score	Team 2
3 October 2026	12:30	Group stage	Germany	7–2	India
4 October 2026	12:30	Group stage	India	5–9	South Korea
5 October 2026	21:30	Group stage	India	1–8	Argentina
7 October 2026	11:00	Placement round	Ecuador	6–5	India
8 October 2026	09:30	Placement round	India	5–4	Chile
9 October 2026	08:00	Placement round	Chile	6–5	India
9 October 2026	15:30	Placement round	India	1–5	Ecuador

Following the placement classification bracket, the India junior men's team finished the tournament in 18th place.

=== Junior women's tournament ===
==== Group A standings ====
Despite placing fourth in the group stage, India advanced to the knockout rounds based on the competition's tournament qualification system.

Pos	Team	Pld	W	OTW	OTL	L	GF	GA	GD	Pts	Qualification
1	Spain	3	3	0	0	0	42	0	+42	9	Advanced to Quarterfinals
2	Argentina	3	2	0	0	1	7	13	−6	6	Advanced to Quarterfinals
3	Mexico	3	1	0	0	2	4	22	−18	3	Advanced to Quarterfinals
4	India	3	0	0	0	3	2	20	−18	0	Advanced to Quarterfinals

==== Matches ====
Date	Time	Round	Team 1	Score	Team 2
11 October 2026	17:00	Group stage	Spain	14–0	India
12 October 2026	14:00	Group stage	Mexico	2–1	India
13 October 2026	09:30	Group stage	India	1–4	Argentina
14 October 2026	14:00	Quarterfinals	United States	14–2	India
15 October 2026	12:30	Placement round	India	1–4	Italy

Following the placement classification bracket, the India junior women's team finished the tournament in 8th place.

=== Senior men's tournament ===
==== Group D standings ====
The top three teams from the group stage advanced to the Round of 16, while Paraguay proceeded to the classification placement bracket.

Pos	Team	Pld	W	OTW	OTL	L	GF	GA	GD	Pts	Qualification
1	Mexico	3	3	0	0	0	25	1	+24	9	Advanced to Round of 16
2	Ecuador	3	2	0	0	1	23	8	+15	6	Advanced to Round of 16
3	India	3	1	0	0	2	12	25	−13	3	Advanced to Round of 16
4	Paraguay	3	0	0	0	3	2	28	−26	0	Advanced to Placement round

==== Matches ====
Date	Time	Round	Team 1	Score	Team 2
11 October 2026	12:30	Group stage	India	2–12	Ecuador
12 October 2026	17:00	Group stage	Paraguay	2–9	India
13 October 2026	18:30	Group stage	Mexico	11–1	India
14 October 2026	21:30	Round of 16	United States	17–0	India
15 October 2026	18:30	Placement round	India	0–25	Switzerland
16 October 2026	14:00	Placement round	India	1–12	Mexico

Following the placement classification bracket, the India senior men's team finished the tournament in 16th place.

== Rink Hockey ==
=== Senior women's tournament ===
==== Group B standings ====
#	Team	P	W	T	L	GF	GA	GD	PTS	Qualification
1	Italy	5	5	0	0	60	2	+58	15	Advanced to Semifinals
2	Portugal	5	4	0	1	69	6	+63	12	Advanced to Semifinals
3	Colombia	5	3	0	2	17	8	+9	9	Advanced to Placement round
4	Brazil	5	2	0	3	22	38	−16	6	Advanced to Placement round
5	Mexico	5	1	0	4	19	55	−36	3	Advanced to Placement round
6	India	5	0	0	5	4	82	−78	0	Advanced to Placement round

==== Matches ====
Date	Time	Round	Team 1	Score	Team 2
4 October 2026	11:00	Group B	Portugal	28–0	India
5 October 2026	11:00	Group B	India	0–21	Italy
6 October 2026	15:30	Group B	India	3–13	Mexico
7 October 2026	15:30	Group B	Colombia	9–0	India
8 October 2026	15:30	Group B	India	1–11	Brazil
9 October 2026	10:00	Placement	Switzerland	21–0	India

Following the placement classification bracket, the India senior women's team failed to win a single match and finished the tournament at last as 11th position.

=== Under-19 tournament ===
==== Group B standings ====
#	Team	P	W	T	L	GF	GA	GD	PTS	Qualification
1	Portugal	3	3	0	0	30	2	+28	9	Advanced to Quarterfinals
2	France	3	2	0	1	27	6	+21	6	Advanced to Quarterfinals
3	Colombia	3	1	0	2	14	21	−7	3	Advanced to Quarterfinals
4	India	3	0	0	3	3	45	−42	0	Advanced to Quarterfinals

==== Matches ====
Date	Time	Round	Team 1	Score	Team 2
4 October 2026	20:00	Group B	India	0–19	France
6 October 2026	12:00	Group B	Portugal	16–0	India
7 October 2026	09:15	Group B	Colombia	10–3	India
8 October 2026	20:00	Quarterfinals	Spain	16–1	India
9 October 2026	13:00	Placement round	France	24–1	India
10 October 2026	09:45	Placement round	Colombia	18–5	India

Following the placement classification bracket, the India under-19 team failed to win a single match and finished the tournament at last as 8th position.
