= Egoitz Bijueska =

Spanish skateboarder (born 2010)

Personal information
- Full name: Egoitz Bijueska Almagro
- Born: 24 November 2010 (age 15) Bilbao, Spain

Sport
- Country: Spain
- Sport: Skateboarding
Medal record
Men's skateboarding
Representing Spain
World Championships
Gold medal – first place	2025 São Paulo	Park
World Skate Games
Gold medal – first place	2026 Asunción	Park
X Games
Gold medal – first place	2026 Chiba	Park
Silver medal – second place	2026 Sacramento	Park
Bronze medal – third place	2026 New Orleans	Park

Egoitz Bijueska Almagro (born 24 November 2010) is a Spanish skateboarder. Competing in park events, he is a gold medalist at the World Skateboarding Championship, World Skate Games and has won multiple medals at the X Games.

== Early life ==
Bijueska was born in Bilbao and began skating at the age of 7 years.

== Career ==
In September 2024, at the World Skateboarding Championship held in Rome, Bijueska reached the final 8, which marked the first time he reached the World Skateboarding Tour finals. In June 2025, he competed at the Park World Cup stage held in Rome, where he qualified to the final, posting a score of 94.50.

In March 2026, at the 2025 World Skateboarding Championship held in São Paulo, Bijueska won a gold medal in the park event with a score of 95.83 in the final. In Summer 2026, Bijueska competed in the inaugural X Games League as a free agent, in which he won the silver medal in Sacramento, gold medal in Chiba and bronze medal in New Orleans. In October 2026, he compted in the World Skate Games held in Asunción and won a gold medal in the men's park event with a score of 94.50.
