= Hendryk Schamberger =

German ice dancer

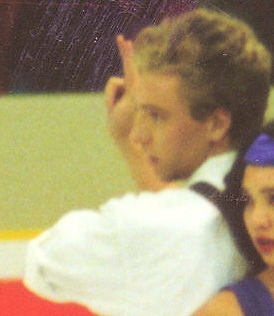
- Goolsbee at the 1992 German Championships in Berlin

Personal information
- Born: 11 May 1968 (age 58) Essen, North Rhine-Westphalia, West Germany
- Height: 1.83 m (6 ft 0 in)

Figure skating career
- Country: Germany
- Skating club: RSC Essen
- Retired: 1995

Hendryk Schamberger (born 11 May 1968) is a German former competitive ice dancer. With Jennifer Goolsbee, he is a four-time German national champion and placed ninth at the 1994 Winter Olympics.

== Personal life ==
Hendryk Schamberger was born to the German former ice dancers Martha and Hans-Jürgen Schamberger. He studied medicine at university during and after the end of his figure skating career. His main profession is orthopedic physician.

== Career ==
Hendryk Schamberger started skating in 1978 and represented the RSC Essen club. He skated with Andrea Weppelmann from 1985 until 1990, winning the German national title in 1989. They placed as high as tenth at the European Championships (1989) and 14th at the World Championships (1989). Weppelmann/Schamberger parted ways after placing third at the 1990 German Championships. The duo had also competed in artistic roller skating — they were bronze medalists in the dance event at the 1989 World Games.

In 1990, Schamberger teamed up with American ice dancer Jennifer Goolsbee. They were coached by Martin Skotnicky in Oberstdorf. They won the German national title four times and competed at the 1994 Winter Olympics, placing ninth. Goolsbee/Schamberger finished as high as seventh at the World Championships (1994) and eighth at the European Championships (1995). They parted ways in 1995 but teamed up again in 1997 to skate in shows.

Schamberger has a German A-coach-licence and coaches ice dancing at the Berliner TSC club. His former students include Tanja Kolbe / Sascha Rabe. He also works as a TV commentator for figure skating for Eurosport. In October 2006, Schamberger participated in RTL's German version of Dancing on Ice, partnered with Liz Baffoe. He was a part of the choreographer team on ProSieben show in 2007.

== Competitive highlights ==
=== With Weppelmann ===
International
Event	1984–85	1985–86	1986–87	1987–88	1988–89	1989–90
Worlds		17th	18th	18th	14th	
Europeans		15th	15th	14th	10th	
Nations Cup						3rd
NHK Trophy					6th	
National
German Champ.	6th	2nd	2nd	2nd	1st	3rd

=== With Goolsbee ===
International
Event	1990–91	1991–92	1992–93	1993–94	1994–95
Olympics				9th	
Worlds	17th	11th	12th	7th	11th
Europeans	11th	10th	10th	9th	8th
Nations Cup			3rd		
Skate Canada		7th			
National
German Champ.	2nd	1st	1st	1st	1st
