= Estelares =

Argentine alternative rock band

- Origin: La Plata, Buenos Aires Province, Argentina
- Genres: Alternative rock Pop rock Indie rock
- Years active: 1994–present
- Labels: PopArt Discos
- Members: Manuel Moretti – vocal, guitar; Víctor Bertamoni – guitars; Pali Silvera – bass; Javier Miranda – drums; Guillermo Harrington – guitars, backing vocals; Eduardo Minervino – keyboards
- Past members: Carlos Sánchez – drums; Luciano Mutinelli – drums; David Panza – guitars

Estelares is an Argentine alternative rock band formed in 1994 in La Plata, Buenos Aires Province, Argentina. It was founded by vocalist and songwriter Manuel Moretti, guitarist Víctor Bertamoni, and bassist Pali Silvera. Since the mid-1990s, the band has released multiple studio and live albums and has remained active in the Argentine rock scene. The band gained wide recognition with the album Sistema Nervioso Central and the single “Aire,” which became one of their most iconic tracks.

== History ==
Estelares began performing in local venues in La Plata and Buenos Aires during the early 1990s. Their debut album, Extraño Lugar, was released in 1996, marking the start of a steady recording career.

Wider recognition came with the release of Sistema Nervioso Central in 2006, whose single “Aire” became a milestone in the band's career.

Throughout the 2010s, the band continued releasing new material and performing at major venues, including the Gran Rex Theatre in Buenos Aires. In 2016, they released Las Antenas, which won the 2017 Premio Gardel for Best Pop Group Album.

In 2025, they released their tenth studio album, Los Lobos, which features new compositions and a reworked version of their earlier track “Como cría de leopardo”.

== Musical style ==
Critics describe Estelares’ music as a mix of alternative rock and pop rock, with an emphasis on melodic songwriting and thoughtful lyrics, reflecting a consistent evolution within the Argentine rock tradition.

== Discography ==
=== Studio albums ===
- Extraño Lugar (1996)
- Amantes Suicidas (1998)
- Ardimos (2003)
- Sistema Nervioso Central (2006)
- Una temporada en el amor (2009)
- El Costado Izquierdo (2012)
- Las Antenas (2016)
- Las Lunas (2019)
- Un Mar de Soles Rojos (2022)
- Los Lobos (2025)

=== Live albums ===
- Estelares: Vivo en el Gran Rex (2014)

== Awards ==
- Premio Gardel for Best Pop Group Album – Las Antenas (2017)
