= Artistic roller skating at the World Games =

Artistic roller skating was introduced as a World Games sport at the 1981 World Games in Santa Clara, California.

== Medalists ==
=== Men ===
==== Free skating ====
Games	Gold	Silver	Bronze
1981 Santa Clara	Mike Glatz (USA)	Rick Elsworth (USA)	Michele Biserni (ITA)
1985 London	Scott Cohen (USA)	Michele Biserni (ITA)	Bryan Denney (USA)
1989 Karlsruhe	Sandro Guerra (ITA)	David DeMotte (USA)	Thomas Löhe (FRG)
1993 The Hague	Heath Mederios (USA)	Jayson Sutcliffe (AUS)	Samo Kokorovec (ITA)
1997 Lahti	Eric Anderson (USA)	Clemente Cerezo (ESP)	Lee Taylor (GBR)
2001 Akita	Luca Lailai (ITA)	Joshua Rhodes (USA)	Daniel Arriola (ARG)
2005 Duisburg	François Cattoire (FRA)	Albert Trilla (ESP)	Neil Emms (GBR)
2009 Kaohsiung	Carles Gasset (ESP)	Roberto Riva (ITA)	Marcel Stürmer (BRA)
2013 Cali	Marcel Stürmer (BRA)	Markus Lell (GER)	Andrea Aracu (ITA)
2017 Wrocław	Luca Lucaroni (ITA)	Pierre Mériel (FRA)	Juan F. Sánchez (ARG)
2022 Birmingham	Pau Garcia (ESP)	Alessandro Liberatore (ITA)	Tim Niclas Schubert (GER)

=== Women ===
==== Free skating ====
Games	Gold	Silver	Bronze
1981 Santa Clara	Anna Conklin (USA)	Elena Bonati (ITA)	Tina Kneisley (USA)
1985 London	Tina Kneisley (USA)	Rafaella del Vinaccio (ITA)	Elena Bonati (ITA)
1989 Karlsruhe	Rafaella del Vinaccio (ITA)	April Rex (USA)	Kirsten Murphy (AUS)
1993 The Hague	Anna Cocco (ITA)	Dezera Salas (USA)	Laure Bourguignon (FRA)
1997 Lahti	Tammy Bryant (AUS)	Jennifer Orcutt (USA)	Laure Bourguignon (FRA)
2001 Akita	Heather Mulkey (USA)	Erica Colaceci (ITA)	Elke Dederichs (GER)
2005 Duisburg	Laura Sánchez (ESP)	Lucija Minaric (SLO)	Diana Ribeiro (POR)
2009 Kaohsiung	Tanja Romano (ITA)	Nika Arcon (SLO)	Monika Lis (GER)
2013 Cali	Debora Sbei (ITA)	Lucija Mlinaric (SLO)	Nataly Otalora (COL)
2017 Wrocław	Silvia Nemesio (ITA)	Mónica Gimeno (ESP)	Rafaela Freitas (BRA)
2022 Birmingham	Rebecca Tarlazi (ITA)	Andrea Silva (ESP)	Carla Escrich (ESP)

=== Mixed ===
==== Pairs ====
Games	Gold	Silver	Bronze
1981 Santa Clara	United States (USA); Tina Kneisley; Paul Price	United States (USA); Ann Green; Rick Elsworth	Canada (CAN); Sylvia Gingras; Guy Aubin
1985 London	United States (USA); Robyn Young; Ken Benson	United States (USA); Cathy Hayduk; Mark Pollard	West Germany (FRG); Anette Munzing; Michael Seeger
1989 Karlsruhe	United States (USA); Tina Jeru; Larry McGrew	West Germany (FRG); Nicole Friedel; Thomas Löhe	United States (USA); Kirsten Murphy; David Morrison
1993 The Hague	Italy (ITA); Maura Ferri; Patrick Venerucci	United States (USA); Dezera Salas; David DeMotte	Argentina (ARG); Gabriela Mugica; Flavio Fissolo
1997 Lahti	United States (USA); Gari Phillips; Marc Goohs	United States (USA); Amy York; Brian Richardson	Germany (GER); Kerstin Sacher; Stefan Müller
2001 Akita	Italy (ITA); Beatrice Palazzi-Rossi; Patrick Venerucci	United States (USA); Candice Heiden; William Crowder	Brazil (BRA); Luciana Hyodo; Max Coelho
2005 Duisburg	Italy (ITA); Marika Zanforlin; Federico Degli Esposti	Germany (GER); Tanja Bänsch; Patrick Friede	United States (USA); Aubrey Orcutt; Robert Hines
2009 Kaohsiung	Italy (ITA); Sara Venerucci; Matteo Guarise	United States (USA); Aubrey Orcutt; Robert Hines	Germany (GER); Christiane Reich; Hannes Muschol
2013 Cali	Italy (ITA); Sara Venerucci; Danilo Decembrini	Argentina (ARG); Florencia Mariel Moyano; Javier Luis Anzil	Italy (ITA); Giulia Merli; Daniele Ragazzi
2017 Wrocław	Italy (ITA); Rebecca Tarlazzi; Luca Lucaroni	Italy (ITA); Sara Venerucci; Marco Garelli	France (FRA); Marine Portet; Nathanaël Fouloy

==== Dance ====
Games	Gold	Silver	Bronze
1981 Santa Clara	United States (USA); Holly Valente; William Richardson	United States (USA); Cindy Smith; Mark Howard	Great Britain (GBR); Kim Geoghegan; Eamon Geoghegan
1985 London	United States (USA); Anna Danks; Scott Myers	West Germany (FRG); Andrea Steudte; Martin Hauss	United States (USA); Jeannie Parks; Rob Galambos
1989 Karlsruhe	Italy (ITA); Claudia Rinaldi; Alberto Borsarini	United States (USA); Jodee Viola; Greg Goody	West Germany (FRG); Andrea Weppelmann; Hendryk Schamberger
1993 The Hague	United States (USA); Deanna Monahan; Doug Wait	Italy (ITA); Alessandra Lanzoni; Roberto Stanzari	Italy (ITA); Annamaria Culcasi; Franco Culcasi
1997 Lahti	Germany (GER); Swantje Gebauer; Alex Haber	United States (USA); Tara Graney; Tim Patten	United States (USA); Harriet Graham; Jeffrey Clement
2001 Akita	United States (USA); Melissa Quinn; Adam White	Australia (AUS); Ester Ambrus; Gawaine Davis	Argentina (ARG); Analia Silvana Martínez; Gaston Passini
2005 Duisburg	Italy (ITA); Monica Coffele; Marco Bomati	Italy (ITA); Enrica Gasparini; Gabriele Gasparini	United States (USA); Julie Locke; Logan Boggs
2009 Kaohsiung	Italy (ITA); Enrica Gasparini; Gabriele Gasparini	Spain (ESP); Ayelen Morales; Oscar Molins	United States (USA); Erin Ovens; Jonathan Cross
2013 Cali	Italy (ITA); Anna Remonidi; Alessandro Spigai	Italy (ITA); Elena Leoni; Filippo Lodi Forni	Colombia (COL); Marcela Cruz; Leonardo Parrado
2017 Wrocław	Italy (ITA); Elena Leoni; Alessandro Spigai	Italy (ITA); Silvia Stibilj; Andrea Bassi	Portugal (POR); Mariana Souto; José Souto
2022 Birmingham	Portugal (POR); Ana Luisa Monteiro; Pedro Monteiro	Italy (ITA); Asya Sofia Testoni; Giovanni Piccolantonio	Colombia (COL); Brayan Carreño; Daniela Gerena
