= Jennifer Goolsbee =

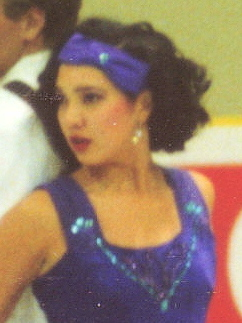
- Schamberger at the 1992 German Championships in Berlin

Personal information
- Other names: Jennifer Goolsbee-Schneble
- Born: September 6, 1968 (age 57) Detroit, Michigan, U.S.
- Height: 5 ft 5 in (1.65 m)

Figure skating career
- Country: Germany; United States
- Skating club: RSC Essen
- Began skating: 1975
- Retired: 1997

Jennifer Goolsbee (born September 6, 1968) is a former competitive ice dancer who is best known for her partnership with Hendryk Schamberger for Germany. With Schamberger, she is a four-time German national champion and placed ninth at the 1994 Winter Olympics.

== Career ==
Early in her career, Goolsby, along with Peter Chupa, James Schilling and Shawn Rettstatt, took turns playing for the United States.

In 1990, Goolsbee teamed up with German ice dancer Hendryk Schamberger to compete for Germany. They were coached by Martin Skotnicky in Oberstdorf. They won the German national title four times and competed at the 1994 Winter Olympics, placing ninth. Goolsbee/Schamberger finished as high as seventh at the World Championships (1994) and eighth at the European Championships (1995). They parted ways in 1995.

Goolsbee later had a brief partnership with Armenian ice dancer Samuel Gezalian. They won the German title in 1997.

Goolsbee and Schamberger teamed up again in 1997 to skate in shows.

== Personal life ==
Goolsbee received German citizenship in December 1993. She moved back to the United States in 1998. In 2001, she married former ice dancer Kyle Schneble, with whom she has a daughter, Jordyn, and son, Rush.

== Competitive highlights ==
=== With Gezalian ===
Results
National
Event	1997
German Championships	1st

=== With Schamberger ===
International
Event	1990–91	1991–92	1992–93	1993–94	1994–95
Olympics				9th	
Worlds	17th	11th	12th	7th	11th
Europeans	11th	10th	10th	9th	8th
Nations Cup			3rd		
Skate Canada		7th			
National
German Champ.	2nd	1st	1st	1st	1st

=== With Schilling ===
National
Event	1989
U.S. Championships	13th
