= Costanera de Asunción =

Avenida Costanera
- Costanera José Asunción Flores; Costanera Doctora Serafina Dávalos; Costanera Héroes del 70
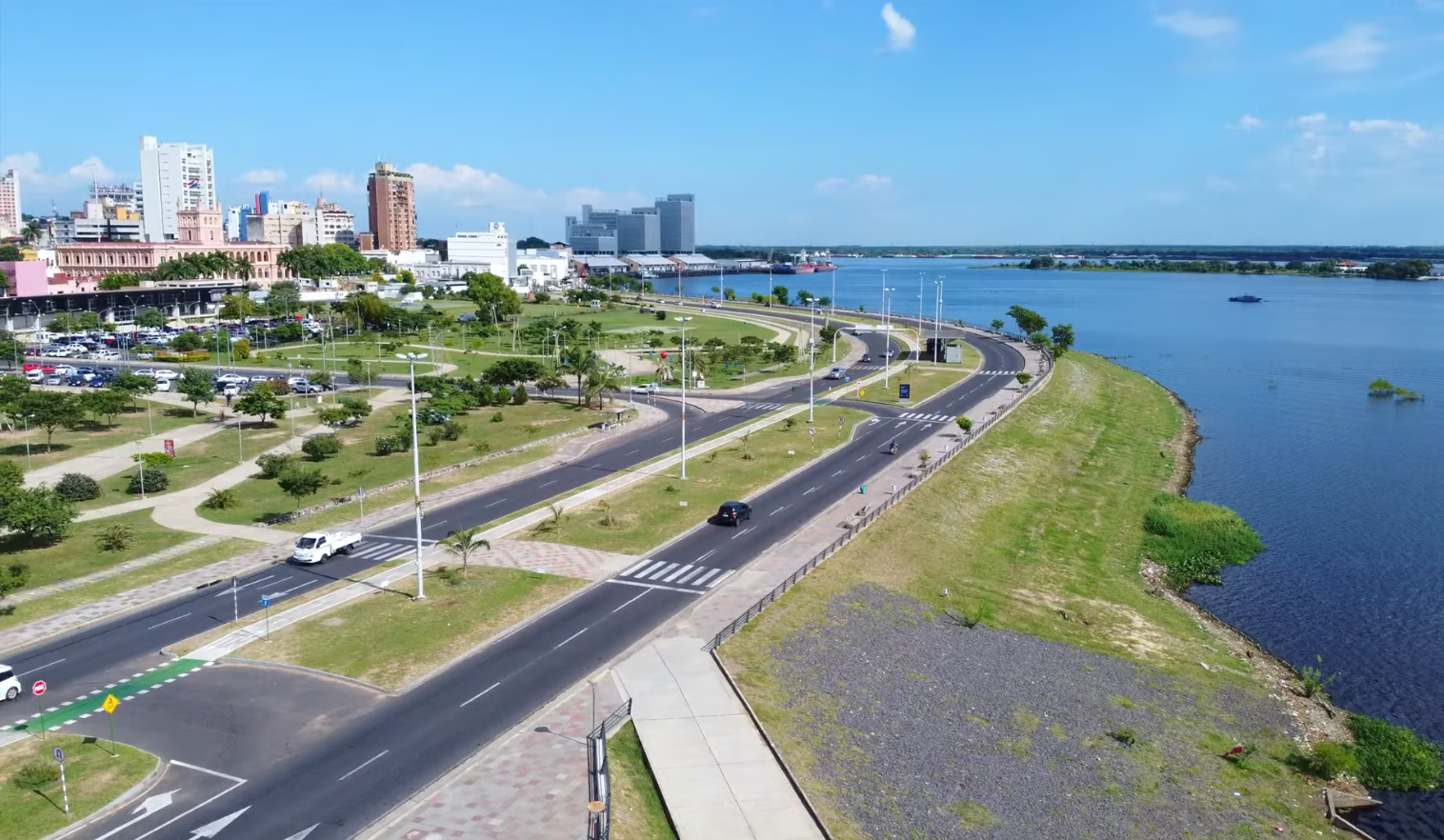
- Interactive map of Avenida Costanera
- Owner: Ministry of Public Works and Communications
- Length: 3 km (Cost. José Asunción Flores) 4 km (Cost. Serafina Dávalos) 8.8 km (Cost. Héroes del 70)
- Location: Asunción, Paraguay

Construction
- Inauguration: 2012 (Cost. José Asunción Flores) 2020 (Cost. Serafina Dávalos) 2024 (Cost. Héroes del 70)

Avenida Costanera (or simply Costanera) is the generic name for the avenues and pedestrian promenades in Asunción along the banks of the Paraguay River. The first section of the north section, named Costanera José Asunción Flores, was inaugurated in 2012; it begins at Colón Street and ends at General Santos Avenue. The second section, named Costanera Doctora Serafina Dávalos extends from General Santos Avenue to Primer Presidente Avenue, subsequently connecting with the Ñu Guasú Highway to reach the city of Luque. The south section, officially called Costanera Héroes del 70, was inaugurated in July 2024, extends from the junction with Colón and Montevideo streets to Coronel Abrahan Schweizer Avenue.

== Background ==
Construction of the first phase of the Costanera began in June 2010 under the Ministry of Public Works and Communications, led by Minister Efraín Alegre during the presidency of Fernando Lugo. After two and a half years of work, it was inaugurated in December 2012. The second section was opened in June 2020 under the name "Costanera Norte" (North Coastway), while the southern section was inaugurated in July 2024.

== Characteristics ==
The avenue runs along the Asunción Bay, skirting the Historic Centre of Asunción and bypassing the Cabildo, the National Congress, the Metropolitan Cathedral, the Palacio de los López, and the General Directorate of Customs.

== Viability ==
The avenue is a two-way thoroughfare along its entire length, with two lanes in each direction. However, on Sundays and public holidays, vehicle traffic is closed off on the bayside lanes to convert them into a pedestrian zone.
