= Manuel Moretti =

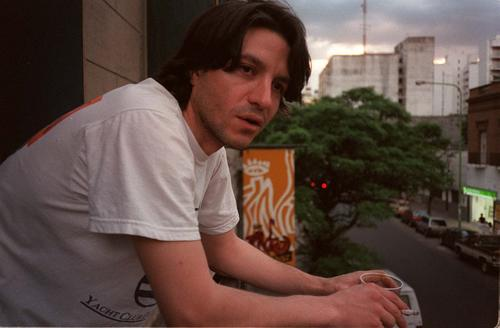

Background information
- Born: Juan Manuel Moretti; December 28, 1965 (age 60); Junín, Buenos Aires Province, Argentina
- Genres: Alternative rock Pop rock
- Occupations: Singer; Musician; Songwriter
- Instruments: Guitar; Vocals
- Years active: 1988–present
- Labels: Pop Art Discos

Juan Manuel Moretti (born December 28, 1965), known professionally as Manuel Moretti, is an Argentine singer, musician, and songwriter. He is the lead vocalist, primary songwriter, and founding member of the Argentine rock band Estelares, a group that has maintained continuous activity since the mid-1990s and has received sustained coverage in national Argentine media.

== Early life ==
Moretti was born in Junín, Buenos Aires Province, Argentina. He became involved in music during the late 1980s, participating in several early projects prior to the formation of Estelares.

== Career ==
In 1994, Moretti co-founded Estelares in La Plata. The band gradually established itself within the Argentine rock scene, releasing albums throughout the late 1990s and 2000s and performing regularly at national venues and festivals.

Several Argentine media outlets identify the album Sistema Nervioso Central (2006) as a turning point in the band's visibility, after which Estelares reached a broader audience and consolidated its position within mainstream Argentine rock.

Alongside his work with the band, Moretti has performed solo on occasion, primarily in acoustic formats, and has participated in literary and cultural events related to songwriting and poetry.

== Musical style ==
Moretti's songwriting is generally associated with alternative rock and pop rock. Reviews and interviews frequently note an emphasis on melody and introspective lyrics, a style that has remained consistent throughout Estelares’ discography.

== Selected discography ==
(All releases with Estelares unless otherwise noted)

- Sistema Nervioso Central (2006)
- Una Temporada en el Amor (2009)
- Las Antenas (2016) – Premio Gardel winner for Best Pop Group Album.
- Las Lunas (2019)
- Los Lobos (2025)
