= Tim Patten =

American roller derby athlete

- Born: 1952 (age 73–74)
- Citizenship: United States
- Occupation: Writer
- Writing career
- Language: English

Tim Patten (born 1952) is a former roller derby athlete now a self-published author having seven books under his name.

== Early life and education ==
In 1973, Patten moved from Wisconsin to San Francisco. He studied computer science in college and has worked off and on in the computer industry ever since. Patten skated for various professional roller derby leagues from 1973 to 1992. In 1988 he became owner of the San Francisco Bay Bombers team. He later formed his own league, the San Francisco-based American Roller Derby League (ARDL), which has gone through several incarnations but generally focuses on promoting a team named the Bay City Bombers.

== Later career ==
The award-winning documentary film Jam, screening at film festivals and special events in 2006, followed Patten's attempts, from 1998 to 2004, to find success with his league. The documentary Jam also appeared on the SUNDANCE channel for 2.5 years on rotation.

For four years, while seeking treatment for an HIV-related neurological infection, the infection was healed through progressive medications, Patten wrote the novel Roller Babes: the Story of the Roller Derby Queen, which he self-published under his sister's name D. M. Bordner in 2005. She receives his royalties. The novel was described in an independent, Michigan-based publication as "a fictional yet historically accurate and personalized account of the national women's roller derby leagues in the 1950s". Film rights to the novel were sold to Kaliber Films in July 2006.

In 2014, Patten wrote the book, honoring Herbivour and MGTOW: Why I Cheat: Men, Marriage, and Cheating.

== Bibliography ==
- Patten, Tim (2014), Why I Cheat: Men, Marriage, and Cheating, iUniverse, ISBN 978-1-49172-449-1
- Patten, Tim (2016), MGTOW Building Wealth and Power, iUniverse, ISBN 978-1-49178-720-5

== External links and references ==
- baycitybombers.com - Web site through which Patten promotes his league and roller derby in general
- JAM the Movie - Web site for the documentary about Patten and his league
- National Men's Coalition writer - Are men winning the battle of the sexes?
- National Men's Coalition writer - 17 Dating Tips for Women and Millennial Men
