= List of teams and cyclists in the 2023 Tour de France =

List of cyclists

The number of riders per nation that participated in the 2023 Tour de France: 20+ / 10–19 / 2–9 / 1

Twenty-two teams are scheduled to take part in the 2023 Tour de France. All 18 UCI WorldTeams have been automatically invited. They were joined by 4 UCI ProTeams - the two highest placed UCI ProTeams in 2022 (Lotto–Dstny and Team TotalEnergies), along with Uno-X Pro Cycling Team and Israel–Premier Tech who were selected by Amaury Sport Organisation (ASO), the organisers of the Tour. The teams were announced on 4 January 2023.

== Teams ==
UCI WorldTeams

- AG2R Citroën Team
- Alpecin–Deceuninck
- Arkéa–Samsic
- Astana Qazaqstan Team
- Bora–Hansgrohe
- Cofidis
- EF Education–EasyPost
- Groupama–FDJ
- INEOS Grenadiers
- Intermarché–Circus–Wanty
- Lidl–Trek
- Movistar Team
- Soudal–Quick-Step
- Team Bahrain Victorious
- Team dsm–firmenich
- Team Jayco–AlUla
- Team Jumbo–Visma
- UAE Team Emirates

UCI ProTeams

- Israel–Premier Tech
- Lotto–Dstny
- Team TotalEnergies
- Uno-X Pro Cycling Team

== Cyclists ==
Legend
| No. | Starting number worn by the rider during the Tour |
| Pos. | Position in the general classification |
| Time | Deficit to the winner of the general classification |
| ‡ | Denotes riders born on or after 1 January 1998 eligible for the young rider classification |
| General classification | Denotes the winner of the general classification |
| Points classification | Denotes the winner of the points classification |
| Mountains classification | Denotes the winner of the mountains classification |
| Young rider classification | Denotes the winner of the young rider classification (eligibility indicated by ‡) |
| Team classification | Denotes riders that represent the winner of the team classification |
| | Denotes the winner of the super-combativity award |
| DNS | Denotes a rider who did not start a stage, followed by the stage before which he withdrew |
| DNF | Denotes a rider who did not finish a stage, followed by the stage in which he withdrew |
| DSQ | Denotes a rider who was disqualified from the race, followed by the stage in which this occurred |
| OTL | Denotes a rider finished outside the time limit, followed by the stage in which they did so |
Ages correct as of Saturday 1 July 2023, the date on which the Tour begins

=== By starting number ===
| No. | Name | Nationality | Team | Age | Pos. | Time | Ref. |
|---|---|---|---|---|---|---|---|
| 1 | Jonas Vingegaard | Denmark | Team Jumbo–Visma | 26 | 1 | 82h 05' 42" | |
| 2 | Tiesj Benoot | Belgium | Team Jumbo–Visma | 29 | 24 | + 1h 46' 55" | |
| 3 | Wilco Kelderman | Netherlands | Team Jumbo–Visma | 32 | 18 | + 1h 06' 46" | |
| 4 | Sepp Kuss | United States | Team Jumbo–Visma | 28 | 12 | + 37' 32" | |
| 5 | Christophe Laporte | France | Team Jumbo–Visma | 30 | 80 | + 4h 05' 47" | |
| 6 | Wout van Aert | Belgium | Team Jumbo–Visma | 28 | DNS-18 | – | |
| 7 | Dylan van Baarle | Netherlands | Team Jumbo–Visma | 31 | 42 | + 2h 46' 05" | |
| 8 | Nathan Van Hooydonck | Belgium | Team Jumbo–Visma | 27 | 93 | + 4h 24' 04" | |
| 11 | Tadej Pogačar ‡ | Slovenia | UAE Team Emirates | 24 | 2 | + 7' 29" | |
| 12 | Mikkel Bjerg ‡ | Denmark | UAE Team Emirates | 24 | 123 | + 5h 09' 02" | |
| 14 | Felix Großschartner | Austria | UAE Team Emirates | 29 | 23 | + 1h 45' 21" | |
| 15 | Vegard Stake Laengen | Norway | UAE Team Emirates | 34 | 102 | + 4h 40' 23" | |
| 16 | Rafał Majka | Poland | UAE Team Emirates | 33 | 14 | + 56' 09" | |
| 17 | Marc Soler | Spain | UAE Team Emirates | 29 | 56 | + 3h 09' 56" | |
| 18 | Matteo Trentin | Italy | UAE Team Emirates | 33 | 107 | + 4h 44' 34" | |
| 19 | Adam Yates | Great Britain | UAE Team Emirates | 30 | 3 | + 10' 56" | |
| 21 | Egan Bernal | Colombia | INEOS Grenadiers | 26 | 36 | + 2h 38' 16" | |
| 22 | Jonathan Castroviejo | Spain | INEOS Grenadiers | 36 | 15 | + 56' 37" | |
| 23 | Omar Fraile | Spain | INEOS Grenadiers | 32 | 60 | + 3h 19' 04" | |
| 24 | Michał Kwiatkowski | Poland | INEOS Grenadiers | 33 | 49 | + 2h 56' 08" | |
| 25 | Daniel Martínez | Colombia | INEOS Grenadiers | 27 | DNS-15 | – | |
| 26 | Tom Pidcock ‡ | Great Britain | INEOS Grenadiers | 23 | 13 | +47' 52" | |
| 27 | Carlos Rodríguez ‡ | Spain | INEOS Grenadiers | 22 | 5 | + 13' 17" | |
| 28 | Ben Turner ‡ | Great Britain | INEOS Grenadiers | 24 | DNF-13 | – | |
| 31 | David Gaudu | France | Groupama–FDJ | 26 | 9 | + 23' 08" | |
| 32 | Kevin Geniets | Luxembourg | Groupama–FDJ | 26 | 41 | + 2h 44' 14" | |
| 33 | Stefan Küng | Switzerland | Groupama–FDJ | 29 | 54 | + 3h 08' 29" | |
| 34 | Olivier Le Gac | France | Groupama–FDJ | 29 | 131 | + 5h 17' 09" | |
| 35 | Valentin Madouas | France | Groupama–FDJ | 26 | 20 | + 1h 14' 10" | |
| 36 | Quentin Pacher | France | Groupama–FDJ | 31 | 63 | + 3h 33' 43" | |
| 37 | Thibaut Pinot | France | Groupama–FDJ | 33 | 11 | + 28' 03" | |
| 38 | Lars van den Berg ‡ | Netherlands | Groupama–FDJ | 24 | 70 | + 3h 46' 03" | |
| 41 | Richard Carapaz | Ecuador | EF Education–EasyPost | 30 | DNS-2 | – | |
| 42 | Andrey Amador | Costa Rica | EF Education–EasyPost | 36 | 110 | + 4h 54' 07" | |
| 43 | Alberto Bettiol | Italy | EF Education–EasyPost | 29 | 83 | + 4h 08' 58" | |
| 44 | Esteban Chaves | Colombia | EF Education–EasyPost | 33 | DNF-14 | – | |
| 45 | Magnus Cort | Denmark | EF Education–EasyPost | 30 | 96 | + 4h 32' 15" | |
| 46 | Neilson Powless | United States | EF Education–EasyPost | 26 | 66 | + 3h 37' 30" | |
| 47 | James Shaw | Great Britain | EF Education–EasyPost | 27 | DNF-14 | – | |
| 48 | Rigoberto Urán | Colombia | EF Education–EasyPost | 36 | 71 | + 3h 50' 15" | |
| 51 | Julian Alaphilippe | France | Soudal–Quick-Step | 31 | 33 | + 2h 25' 43" | |
| 52 | Kasper Asgreen | Denmark | Soudal–Quick-Step | 28 | 87 | + 4h 15' 09" | |
| 53 | Rémi Cavagna | France | Soudal–Quick-Step | 27 | 106 | + 4h 44' 01" | |
| 54 | Tim Declercq | Belgium | Soudal–Quick-Step | 34 | 118 | + 5h 05' 18" | |
| 55 | Dries Devenyns | Belgium | Soudal–Quick-Step | 39 | 119 | + 5h 06' 37" | |
| 56 | Fabio Jakobsen | Netherlands | Soudal–Quick-Step | 26 | DNS-12 | – | |
| 57 | Yves Lampaert | Belgium | Soudal–Quick-Step | 32 | 104 | + 4h 42' 36" | |
| 58 | Michael Mørkøv | Denmark | Soudal–Quick-Step | 38 | 150 | + 6h 07' 11" | |
| 62 | Mikel Landa | Spain | Team Bahrain Victorious | 33 | 19 | + 1h 12' 41" | |
| 63 | Nikias Arndt | Germany | Team Bahrain Victorious | 31 | 121 | + 5h 08' 07" | |
| 64 | Phil Bauhaus | Germany | Team Bahrain Victorious | 28 | DNF-17 | – | |
| 65 | Pello Bilbao | Spain | Team Bahrain Victorious | 33 | 6 | + 13' 27" | |
| 66 | Jack Haig | Australia | Team Bahrain Victorious | 29 | 28 | + 2h 10' 32" | |
| 67 | Matej Mohorič | Slovenia | Team Bahrain Victorious | 28 | 72 | + 3h 51' 05" | |
| 68 | Wout Poels | Netherlands | Team Bahrain Victorious | 35 | 27 | + 2h 05' 44" | |
| 69 | Fred Wright ‡ | Great Britain | Team Bahrain Victorious | 24 | 92 | + 4h 22' 51" | |
| 71 | Jai Hindley | Australia | Bora–Hansgrohe | 27 | 7 | + 14' 44" | |
| 72 | Emanuel Buchmann | Germany | Bora–Hansgrohe | 30 | 21 | + 1h 15' 44" | |
| 73 | Marco Haller | Austria | Bora–Hansgrohe | 32 | 78 | + 4h 02' 37" | |
| 74 | Bob Jungels | Luxembourg | Bora–Hansgrohe | 30 | 26 | + 1h 58' 46" | |
| 75 | Patrick Konrad | Austria | Bora–Hansgrohe | 31 | 82 | + 4h 07' 43" | |
| 76 | Jordi Meeus ‡ | Belgium | Bora–Hansgrohe | 25 | 139 | + 5h 33' 51" | |
| 77 | Nils Politt | Germany | Bora–Hansgrohe | 29 | 62 | + 3h 28' 47" | |
| 78 | Danny van Poppel | Netherlands | Bora–Hansgrohe | 29 | 116 | + 5h 01' 34" | |
| 81 | Giulio Ciccone | Italy | Lidl–Trek | 28 | 32 | + 2h 24' 29" | |
| 82 | Tony Gallopin | France | Lidl–Trek | 35 | 86 | + 4h 14' 49" | |
| 83 | Mattias Skjelmose ‡ | Denmark | Lidl–Trek | 22 | 29 | + 2h 15' 27" | |
| 84 | Alex Kirsch | Luxembourg | Lidl–Trek | 31 | 115 | + 5h 00' 55" | |
| 85 | Juan Pedro López | Spain | Lidl–Trek | 25 | 74 | + 3h 54' 39" | |
| 86 | Mads Pedersen | Denmark | Lidl–Trek | 27 | 105 | + 4h 43' 50" | |
| 87 | Quinn Simmons ‡ | United States | Lidl–Trek | 22 | DNS-9 | – | |
| 88 | Jasper Stuyven | Belgium | Lidl–Trek | 33 | 79 | + 4h 03' 24" | |
| 91 | Ben O'Connor | Australia | AG2R Citroën Team | 27 | 17 | + 1h 04' 59" | |
| 92 | Clément Berthet | France | AG2R Citroën Team | 25 | 25 | + 1h 50' 19" | |
| 93 | Benoît Cosnefroy | France | AG2R Citroën Team | 27 | 101 | + 4h 39' 22" | |
| 94 | Stan Dewulf | Belgium | AG2R Citroën Team | 25 | 81 | + 4h 07' 42" | |
| 95 | Felix Gall ‡ | Austria | AG2R Citroën Team | 25 | 8 | + 16' 09" | |
| 96 | Oliver Naesen | Belgium | AG2R Citroën Team | 32 | 76 | + 3h 56' 45" | |
| 97 | Aurélien Paret-Peintre | France | AG2R Citroën Team | 27 | 55 | + 3h 09' 31" | |
| 98 | Nans Peters | France | AG2R Citroën Team | 29 | 73 | + 3h 53' 06" | |
| 101 | Mathieu van der Poel | Netherlands | Alpecin–Deceuninck | 28 | 57 | + 3h 11' 24" | |
| 102 | Silvan Dillier | Switzerland | Alpecin–Deceuninck | 32 | 129 | + 5h 15' 06" | |
| 103 | Michael Gogl | Austria | Alpecin–Deceuninck | 29 | 133 | + 5h 19' 44" | |
| 104 | Quinten Hermans | Belgium | Alpecin–Deceuninck | 27 | 113 | + 4h 58' 42" | |
| 105 | Søren Kragh Andersen | Denmark | Alpecin–Deceuninck | 28 | 122 | + 5h 08' 38" | |
| 106 | Jasper Philipsen ‡ | Belgium | Alpecin–Deceuninck | 25 | 97 | + 4h 32' 46" | |
| 107 | Jonas Rickaert | Belgium | Alpecin–Deceuninck | 29 | 114 | + 5h 00' 23" | |
| 108 | Ramon Sinkeldam | Netherlands | Alpecin–Deceuninck | 34 | DNF-14 | – | |
| 111 | Biniam Girmay ‡ | Eritrea | Intermarché–Circus–Wanty | 23 | 125 | + 5h 10' 20" | |
| 112 | Lilian Calmejane | France | Intermarché–Circus–Wanty | 30 | 77 | + 4h 01' 43" | |
| 113 | Rui Costa | Portugal | Intermarché–Circus–Wanty | 36 | 67 | + 3h 37' 57" | |
| 114 | Louis Meintjes | South Africa | Intermarché–Circus–Wanty | 31 | DNF-14 | – | |
| 115 | Adrien Petit | France | Intermarché–Circus–Wanty | 32 | 143 | + 5h 41' 56" | |
| 116 | Dion Smith | New Zealand | Intermarché–Circus–Wanty | 30 | 111 | + 4h 54' 13" | |
| 117 | Mike Teunissen | Netherlands | Intermarché–Circus–Wanty | 30 | 103 | + 4h 41' 35" | |
| 118 | Georg Zimmermann | Germany | Intermarché–Circus–Wanty | 25 | 47 | + 2h 54' 05" | |
| 121 | Guillaume Martin | France | Cofidis | 30 | 10 | + 26' 30" | |
| 122 | Bryan Coquard | France | Cofidis | 31 | 98 | + 4h 33' 15" | |
| 123 | Simon Geschke | Germany | Cofidis | 37 | DNF-18 | – | |
| 124 | Ion Izagirre | Spain | Cofidis | 34 | 45 | + 2h 50' 09" | |
| 125 | Victor Lafay | France | Cofidis | 27 | DNF-20 | – | |
| 126 | Anthony Perez | France | Cofidis | 32 | DNS-18 | – | |
| 127 | Alexis Renard ‡ | France | Cofidis | 24 | DNS-17 | – | |
| 128 | Axel Zingle ‡ | France | Cofidis | 24 | 142 | + 5h 39' 23" | |
| 131 | Enric Mas | Spain | Movistar Team | 28 | DNF-1 | – | |
| 132 | Ruben Guerreiro | Portugal | Movistar Team | 28 | DNF-14 | – | |
| 133 | Alex Aranburu | Spain | Movistar Team | 27 | 52 | + 3h 02' 59" | |
| 134 | Gorka Izagirre | Spain | Movistar Team | 35 | 37 | + 2h 38' 53" | |
| 135 | Matteo Jorgenson ‡ | United States | Movistar Team | 24 | DNS-16 | – | |
| 136 | Gregor Mühlberger | Austria | Movistar Team | 29 | 44 | + 2h 49' 22" | |
| 137 | Nelson Oliveira | Portugal | Movistar Team | 34 | 53 | + 3h 08' 26" | |
| 138 | Antonio Pedrero | Spain | Movistar Team | 31 | DNF-14 | – | |
| 141 | Romain Bardet | France | Team dsm–firmenich | 32 | DNF-14 | – | |
| 142 | John Degenkolb | Germany | Team dsm–firmenich | 34 | 145 | + 5h 44' 09" | |
| 143 | Matthew Dinham ‡ | Australia | Team dsm–firmenich | 23 | 58 | + 3h 13' 32" | |
| 144 | Alex Edmondson | Australia | Team dsm–firmenich | 29 | 146 | + 5h 44' 39" | |
| 145 | Nils Eekhoff ‡ | Netherlands | Team dsm–firmenich | 25 | 138 | + 5h 33' 18" | |
| 146 | Chris Hamilton | Australia | Team dsm–firmenich | 28 | 46 | + 2h 51' 00" | |
| 147 | Kevin Vermaerke ‡ | United States | Team dsm–firmenich | 22 | 61 | + 3h 24' 20" | |
| 148 | Sam Welsford | Australia | Team dsm–firmenich | 27 | 144 | + 5h 42' 20" | |
| 151 | Michael Woods | Canada | Israel–Premier Tech | 36 | 48 | + 2h 54' 47" | |
| 152 | Guillaume Boivin | Canada | Israel–Premier Tech | 34 | 126 | + 5h 11' 01" | |
| 153 | Simon Clarke | Australia | Israel–Premier Tech | 36 | 109 | + 4h 50' 33" | |
| 154 | Hugo Houle | Canada | Israel–Premier Tech | 32 | 38 | + 2h 42' 05" | |
| 155 | Krists Neilands | Latvia | Israel–Premier Tech | 28 | 50 | + 2h 56' 21" | |
| 156 | Nick Schultz | Australia | Israel–Premier Tech | 28 | 39 | + 2h 43' 32" | |
| 157 | Corbin Strong ‡ | New Zealand | Israel–Premier Tech | 23 | 90 | + 4h 21' 21" | |
| 158 | Dylan Teuns | Belgium | Israel–Premier Tech | 31 | 35 | + 2h 34' 28" | |
| 161 | Simon Yates | Great Britain | Team Jayco–AlUla | 30 | 4 | + 12' 23" | |
| 162 | Lawson Craddock | United States | Team Jayco–AlUla | 31 | 84 | + 4h 12' 31" | |
| 163 | Luke Durbridge | Australia | Team Jayco–AlUla | 32 | 130 | + 5h 16' 18" | |
| 164 | Dylan Groenewegen | Netherlands | Team Jayco–AlUla | 30 | 137 | + 5h 27' 21" | |
| 165 | Chris Harper | Australia | Team Jayco–AlUla | 28 | 16 | + 57' 29" | |
| 166 | Christopher Juul-Jensen | Denmark | Team Jayco–AlUla | 33 | 117 | + 5h 04' 45" | |
| 167 | Luka Mezgec | Slovenia | Team Jayco–AlUla | 35 | 112 | + 4h 56' 32" | |
| 168 | Elmar Reinders | Netherlands | Team Jayco–AlUla | 31 | 141 | + 5h 35' 17" | |
| 171 | Warren Barguil | France | Arkéa–Samsic | 31 | 22 | + 1h 17' 06" | |
| 172 | Jenthe Biermans | Belgium | Arkéa–Samsic | 27 | 128 | + 5h 14' 24" | |
| 173 | Clément Champoussin ‡ | France | Arkéa–Samsic | 25 | 51 | + 2h 58' 07" | |
| 174 | Anthony Delaplace | France | Arkéa–Samsic | 33 | 68 | + 3h 41' 37" | |
| 175 | Simon Guglielmi | France | Arkéa–Samsic | 26 | 69 | + 3h 41' 48" | |
| 176 | Matis Louvel ‡ | France | Arkéa–Samsic | 23 | 65 | + 3h 36' 09" | |
| 177 | Luca Mozzato ‡ | Italy | Arkéa–Samsic | 25 | 132 | + 5h 17' 22" | |
| 178 | Laurent Pichon | France | Arkéa–Samsic | 36 | 124 | + 5h 10' 04" | |
| 181 | Caleb Ewan | Australia | Lotto–Dstny | 28 | DNF-13 | – | |
| 182 | Victor Campenaerts | Belgium | Lotto–Dstny | 31 | 64 | + 3h 34' 58" | |
| 183 | Jasper De Buyst | Belgium | Lotto–Dstny | 29 | 136 | + 5h 27' 04" | |
| 184 | Pascal Eenkhoorn | Netherlands | Lotto–Dstny | 26 | 91 | + 4h 21' 55" | |
| 185 | Frederik Frison | Belgium | Lotto–Dstny | 30 | 147 | + 5h 55' 20" | |
| 186 | Jacopo Guarnieri | Italy | Lotto–Dstny | 35 | DNS-5 | – | |
| 187 | Maxim Van Gils ‡ | Belgium | Lotto–Dstny | 23 | 59 | + 3h 17' 49" | |
| 188 | Florian Vermeersch ‡ | Belgium | Lotto–Dstny | 24 | 120 | + 5h 06' 38" | |
| 191 | Mark Cavendish | Great Britain | Astana Qazaqstan Team | 38 | DNF-8 | – | |
| 192 | Cees Bol | Netherlands | Astana Qazaqstan Team | 27 | 149 | + 5h 57' 44" | |
| 193 | David de la Cruz | Spain | Astana Qazaqstan Team | 34 | DNF-12 | – | |
| 194 | Yevgeniy Fedorov ‡ | Kazakhstan | Astana Qazaqstan Team | 23 | 148 | + 5h 56' 37" | |
| 195 | Alexey Lutsenko | Kazakhstan | Astana Qazaqstan Team | 30 | 40 | + 2h 43' 33" | |
| 196 | Gianni Moscon | Italy | Astana Qazaqstan Team | 29 | 135 | + 5h 23' 59" | |
| 197 | Luis León Sánchez | Spain | Astana Qazaqstan Team | 39 | DNS-5 | – | |
| 198 | Harold Tejada | Colombia | Astana Qazaqstan Team | 26 | 34 | + 2h 27' 46" | |
| 201 | Alexander Kristoff | Norway | Uno-X Pro Cycling Team | 35 | 134 | + 5h 23' 51" | |
| 202 | Jonas Abrahamsen | Norway | Uno-X Pro Cycling Team | 27 | 85 | + 4h 13' 32" | |
| 203 | Anthon Charmig ‡ | Denmark | Uno-X Pro Cycling Team | 25 | 99 | + 4h 34' 51" | |
| 204 | Tobias Halland Johannessen ‡ | Norway | Uno-X Pro Cycling Team | 23 | 30 | + 2h 15' 33" | |
| 205 | Rasmus Tiller | Norway | Uno-X Pro Cycling Team | 26 | 108 | + 4h 46' 38" | |
| 206 | Torstein Træen | Norway | Uno-X Pro Cycling Team | 27 | 95 | + 4h 26' 27" | |
| 207 | Søren Wærenskjold ‡ | Norway | Uno-X Pro Cycling Team | 23 | 140 | + 5h 33' 52" | |
| 208 | Jonas Gregaard | Denmark | Uno-X Pro Cycling Team | 26 | 43 | + 2h 47' 07" | |
| 211 | Peter Sagan | Slovakia | Team TotalEnergies | 33 | 127 | + 5h 14' 17" | |
| 212 | Edvald Boasson Hagen | Norway | Team TotalEnergies | 36 | 100 | + 4h 37' 58" | |
| 213 | Mathieu Burgaudeau ‡ | France | Team TotalEnergies | 24 | 31 | + 2h 21' 13" | |
| 214 | Steff Cras | Belgium | Team TotalEnergies | 27 | DNF-8 | – | |
| 215 | Valentin Ferron ‡ | France | Team TotalEnergies | 25 | 89 | + 4h 19' 15" | |
| 216 | Pierre Latour | France | Team TotalEnergies | 29 | 75 | + 3h 55' 25" | |
| 217 | Daniel Oss | Italy | Team TotalEnergies | 36 | 88 | + 4h 16' 19" | |
| 218 | Anthony Turgis | France | Team TotalEnergies | 29 | 94 | + 4h 24' 22" | |

=== By team ===
(Netherlands) Team Jumbo–Visma (TJV)
| No. | Rider | Pos. |
|---|---|---|
| 1 | Jonas Vingegaard (DEN) | 1 |
| 2 | Tiesj Benoot (BEL) | 24 |
| 3 | Wilco Kelderman (NED) | 18 |
| 4 | Sepp Kuss (USA) | 12 |
| 5 | Christophe Laporte (FRA) | 80 |
| 6 | Wout van Aert (BEL) | DNS-18 |
| 7 | Dylan van Baarle (NED) | 42 |
| 8 | Nathan Van Hooydonck (BEL) | 93 |
Directeur sportif: Frans Maassen, Arthur van Dongen

(United Arab Emirates) UAE Team Emirates (UAD)
| No. | Rider | Pos. |
|---|---|---|
| 11 | Tadej Pogačar (SLO) | 2 |
| 12 | Mikkel Bjerg (DEN) | 123 |
| 14 | Felix Großschartner (AUT) | 23 |
| 15 | Vegard Stake Laengen (NOR) | 102 |
| 16 | Rafał Majka (POL) | 14 |
| 17 | Marc Soler (ESP) | 56 |
| 18 | Matteo Trentin (ITA) | 107 |
| 19 | Adam Yates (GBR) | 3 |
Directeur sportif: Andrej Hauptman, Simone Pedrazzini

(United Kingdom) INEOS Grenadiers (IGD)
| No. | Rider | Pos. |
|---|---|---|
| 21 | Egan Bernal (COL) | 36 |
| 22 | Jonathan Castroviejo (ESP) | 15 |
| 23 | Omar Fraile (ESP) | 60 |
| 24 | Michał Kwiatkowski (POL) | 49 |
| 25 | Daniel Martínez (COL) | DNS-15 |
| 26 | Tom Pidcock (GBR) | 13 |
| 27 | Carlos Rodríguez (ESP) | 5 |
| 28 | Ben Turner (GBR) | DNF-13 |
Directeur sportif: Steve Cummings, Xabier Zandio

(France) Groupama–FDJ (GFC)
| No. | Rider | Pos. |
|---|---|---|
| 31 | David Gaudu (FRA) | 9 |
| 32 | Kevin Geniets (LUX) | 41 |
| 33 | Stefan Küng (SUI) | 54 |
| 34 | Olivier Le Gac (FRA) | 131 |
| 35 | Valentin Madouas (FRA) | 20 |
| 36 | Quentin Pacher (FRA) | 63 |
| 37 | Thibaut Pinot (FRA) | 11 |
| 38 | Lars van den Berg (NED) | 70 |
Directeur sportif: Philippe Maduit, Sébastien Joly

(United States) EF Education–EasyPost (EFE)
| No. | Rider | Pos. |
|---|---|---|
| 41 | Richard Carapaz (ECU) | DNS-2 |
| 42 | Andrey Amador (CRC) | 110 |
| 43 | Alberto Bettiol (ITA) | 83 |
| 44 | Esteban Chaves (COL) | DNF-14 |
| 45 | Magnus Cort (DEN) | 96 |
| 46 | Neilson Powless (USA) | 66 |
| 47 | James Shaw (GBR) | DNF-14 |
| 48 | Rigoberto Urán (COL) | 71 |
Directeur sportif: Juan Manuel Gárate, Tom Southam

(Belgium) Soudal–Quick-Step (SOQ)
| No. | Rider | Pos. |
|---|---|---|
| 51 | Julian Alaphilippe (FRA) | 33 |
| 52 | Kasper Asgreen (DEN) | 87 |
| 53 | Rémi Cavagna (FRA) | 106 |
| 54 | Tim Declercq (BEL) | 118 |
| 55 | Dries Devenyns (BEL) | 119 |
| 56 | Fabio Jakobsen (NED) | DNS-12 |
| 57 | Yves Lampaert (BEL) | 104 |
| 58 | Michael Mørkøv (DEN) | 150 |
Directeur sportif: Wilfried Peeters, Tom Steels

Team Bahrain Victorious (TBV)
| No. | Rider | Pos. |
|---|---|---|
| 62 | Mikel Landa (ESP) | 19 |
| 63 | Nikias Arndt (GER) | 121 |
| 64 | Phil Bauhaus (GER) | DNF-17 |
| 65 | Pello Bilbao (ESP) | 6 |
| 66 | Jack Haig (AUS) | 28 |
| 67 | Matej Mohorič (SLO) | 72 |
| 68 | Wout Poels (NED) | 27 |
| 69 | Fred Wright (GBR) | 92 |
Directeur sportif: Gorazd Štangelj, Xavier Florencio

(Germany) Bora–Hansgrohe (BOH)
| No. | Rider | Pos. |
|---|---|---|
| 71 | Jai Hindley (AUS) | 7 |
| 72 | Emanuel Buchmann (GER) | 21 |
| 73 | Marco Haller (AUT) | 78 |
| 74 | Bob Jungels (LUX) | 26 |
| 75 | Patrick Konrad (AUT) | 82 |
| 76 | Jordi Meeus (BEL) | 139 |
| 77 | Nils Politt (GER) | 62 |
| 78 | Danny van Poppel (NED) | 116 |
Directeur sportif: Rolf Aldag, Christian Pömer

(United States) Lidl–Trek (LTK)
| No. | Rider | Pos. |
|---|---|---|
| 81 | Giulio Ciccone (ITA) | 32 |
| 82 | Tony Gallopin (FRA) | 86 |
| 83 | Mattias Skjelmose (DEN) | 29 |
| 84 | Alex Kirsch (LUX) | 115 |
| 85 | Juan Pedro López (ESP) | 74 |
| 86 | Mads Pedersen (DEN) | 105 |
| 87 | Quinn Simmons (USA) | DNS-9 |
| 88 | Jasper Stuyven (BEL) | 79 |
Directeur sportif: Steven de Jongh, Kim Andersen

(France) AG2R Citroën Team (ACT)
| No. | Rider | Pos. |
|---|---|---|
| 91 | Ben O'Connor (AUS) | 17 |
| 92 | Clément Berthet (FRA) | 25 |
| 93 | Benoît Cosnefroy (FRA) | 101 |
| 94 | Stan Dewulf (BEL) | 81 |
| 95 | Felix Gall (AUT) | 8 |
| 96 | Oliver Naesen (BEL) | 76 |
| 97 | Aurélien Paret-Peintre (FRA) | 55 |
| 98 | Nans Peters (FRA) | 73 |
Directeur sportif: Julien Jurdie, Nicolas Guillé

(Belgium) Alpecin–Deceuninck (ADC)
| No. | Rider | Pos. |
|---|---|---|
| 101 | Mathieu van der Poel (NED) | 57 |
| 102 | Silvan Dillier (SUI) | 129 |
| 103 | Michael Gogl (AUT) | 133 |
| 104 | Quinten Hermans (BEL) | 113 |
| 105 | Søren Kragh Andersen (DEN) | 122 |
| 106 | Jasper Philipsen (BEL) | 97 |
| 107 | Jonas Rickaert (BEL) | 114 |
| 108 | Ramon Sinkeldam (NED) | DNF-14 |
Directeur sportif: Christoph Roodhooft, Bart Leysen

(Belgium) Intermarché–Circus–Wanty (ICW)
| No. | Rider | Pos. |
|---|---|---|
| 111 | Biniam Girmay (ERI) | 125 |
| 112 | Lilian Calmejane (FRA) | 77 |
| 113 | Rui Costa (POR) | 67 |
| 114 | Louis Meintjes (RSA) | DNF-14 |
| 115 | Adrien Petit (FRA) | 143 |
| 116 | Dion Smith (NZL) | 111 |
| 117 | Mike Teunissen (NED) | 103 |
| 118 | Georg Zimmermann (GER) | 47 |
Directeur sportif: Steven De Neef, Lorenzo Lapage

(France) Cofidis (COF)
| No. | Rider | Pos. |
|---|---|---|
| 121 | Guillaume Martin (FRA) | 10 |
| 122 | Bryan Coquard (FRA) | 98 |
| 123 | Simon Geschke (GER) | DNF-18 |
| 124 | Ion Izagirre (ESP) | 45 |
| 125 | Victor Lafay (FRA) | DNF-20 |
| 126 | Anthony Perez (FRA) | DNS-18 |
| 127 | Alexis Renard (FRA) | DNS-17 |
| 128 | Axel Zingle (FRA) | 142 |
Directeur sportif: Bingen Fernández, Gorka Gerrikagoitia

(Spain) Movistar Team (MOV)
| No. | Rider | Pos. |
|---|---|---|
| 131 | Enric Mas (ESP) | DNF-1 |
| 132 | Ruben Guerreiro (POR) | DNF-14 |
| 133 | Alex Aranburu (ESP) | 52 |
| 134 | Gorka Izagirre (ESP) | 37 |
| 135 | Matteo Jorgenson (USA) | DNS-16 |
| 136 | Gregor Mühlberger (AUT) | 44 |
| 137 | Nelson Oliveira (POR) | 53 |
| 138 | Antonio Pedrero (ESP) | DNF-14 |
Directeur sportif: Yvon Ledanois, José Vicente García Acosta

(Netherlands) Team dsm–firmenich (DSM)
| No. | Rider | Pos. |
|---|---|---|
| 141 | Romain Bardet (FRA) | DNF-14 |
| 142 | John Degenkolb (GER) | 145 |
| 143 | Matthew Dinham (AUS) | 58 |
| 144 | Alex Edmondson (AUS) | 146 |
| 145 | Nils Eekhoff (NED) | 138 |
| 146 | Chris Hamilton (AUS) | 46 |
| 147 | Kevin Vermaerke (USA) | 61 |
| 148 | Sam Welsford (AUS) | 144 |
Directeur sportif: Matthew Winston, Christian Guiberteau

Israel–Premier Tech (IPT)
| No. | Rider | Pos. |
|---|---|---|
| 151 | Michael Woods (CAN) | 48 |
| 152 | Guillaume Boivin (CAN) | 126 |
| 153 | Simon Clarke (AUS) | 109 |
| 154 | Hugo Houle (CAN) | 38 |
| 155 | Krists Neilands (LAT) | 50 |
| 156 | Nick Schultz (AUS) | 39 |
| 157 | Corbin Strong (NZL) | 90 |
| 158 | Dylan Teuns (BEL) | 35 |
Directeur sportif: Rik Verbrugghe, Dirk Demol

(Australia) Team Jayco–AlUla (JAY)
| No. | Rider | Pos. |
|---|---|---|
| 161 | Simon Yates (GBR) | 4 |
| 162 | Lawson Craddock (USA) | 84 |
| 163 | Luke Durbridge (AUS) | 130 |
| 164 | Dylan Groenewegen (NED) | 137 |
| 165 | Chris Harper (AUS) | 16 |
| 166 | Christopher Juul-Jensen (DEN) | 117 |
| 167 | Luka Mezgec (SLO) | 112 |
| 168 | Elmar Reinders (NED) | 141 |
Directeur sportif: Mathew Hayman, Matthew White

(France) Arkéa–Samsic (ARK)
| No. | Rider | Pos. |
|---|---|---|
| 171 | Warren Barguil (FRA) | 22 |
| 172 | Jenthe Biermans (BEL) | 128 |
| 173 | Clément Champoussin (FRA) | 51 |
| 174 | Anthony Delaplace (FRA) | 68 |
| 175 | Simon Guglielmi (FRA) | 69 |
| 176 | Matis Louvel (FRA) | 65 |
| 177 | Luca Mozzato (ITA) | 132 |
| 178 | Laurent Pichon (FRA) | 124 |
Directeur sportif: Arnaud Gérard, Sébastien Hinault

(Belgium) Lotto–Dstny (LTD)
| No. | Rider | Pos. |
|---|---|---|
| 181 | Caleb Ewan (AUS) | DNF-13 |
| 182 | Victor Campenaerts (BEL) | 64 |
| 183 | Jasper De Buyst (BEL) | 136 |
| 184 | Pascal Eenkhoorn (NED) | 91 |
| 185 | Frederik Frison (BEL) | 147 |
| 186 | Jacopo Guarnieri (ITA) | DNS-5 |
| 187 | Maxim Van Gils (BEL) | 59 |
| 188 | Florian Vermeersch (BEL) | 120 |
Directeur sportif: Mario Aerts, Marc Wauters

(Kazakhstan) Astana Qazaqstan Team (AST)
| No. | Rider | Pos. |
|---|---|---|
| 191 | Mark Cavendish (GBR) | DNF-8 |
| 192 | Cees Bol (NED) | 149 |
| 193 | David de la Cruz (ESP) | DNF-12 |
| 194 | Yevgeniy Fedorov (KAZ) | 148 |
| 195 | Alexey Lutsenko (KAZ) | 40 |
| 196 | Gianni Moscon (ITA) | 135 |
| 197 | Luis León Sánchez (ESP) | DNS-5 |
| 198 | Harold Tejada (COL) | 34 |
Directeur sportif: Alexandre Shefer, Dmitriy Fofonov

(Norway) Uno-X Pro Cycling Team (UXT)
| No. | Rider | Pos. |
|---|---|---|
| 201 | Alexander Kristoff (NOR) | 134 |
| 202 | Jonas Abrahamsen (NOR) | 85 |
| 203 | Anthon Charmig (DEN) | 99 |
| 204 | Tobias Halland Johannessen (NOR) | 30 |
| 205 | Rasmus Tiller (NOR) | 108 |
| 206 | Torstein Træen (NOR) | 95 |
| 207 | Søren Wærenskjold (NOR) | 140 |
| 208 | Jonas Gregaard (DEN) | 43 |
Directeur sportif: Gabriel Rasch, Stig Kristiansen

(France) Team TotalEnergies (TEN)
| No. | Rider | Pos. |
|---|---|---|
| 211 | Peter Sagan (SVK) | 127 |
| 212 | Edvald Boasson Hagen (NOR) | 100 |
| 213 | Mathieu Burgaudeau (FRA) | 31 |
| 214 | Steff Cras (BEL) | DNF-8 |
| 215 | Valentin Ferron (FRA) | 89 |
| 216 | Pierre Latour (FRA) | 75 |
| 217 | Daniel Oss (ITA) | 88 |
| 218 | Anthony Turgis (FRA) | 94 |
Directeur sportif: Benoît Genauzeau, Thibaut Macé

=== By nationality ===
| Country | No. of riders | Finished | Stage wins |
|---|---|---|---|
| Australia | 12 | 11 | 1 (Jai Hindley) |
| Austria | 6 | 6 | 1 (Felix Gall) |
| Belgium | 21 | 19 | 5 (Jordi Meeus, Jasper Philipsen x4) |
| Canada | 3 | 3 | 1 (Michael Woods) |
| Colombia | 5 | 3 | |
| Costa Rica | 1 | 1 | |
| Denmark | 11 | 11 | 3 (Kasper Asgreen, Mads Pedersen, Jonas Vingegaard) |
| Ecuador | 1 | 0 | |
| Eritrea | 1 | 1 | |
| France | 32 | 28 | 1 (Victor Lafay) |
| Germany | 7 | 5 | |
| Great Britain | 7 | 4 | 1 (Adam Yates) |
| Italy | 7 | 6 | |
| Kazakhstan | 2 | 2 | |
| Latvia | 1 | 1 | |
| Luxembourg | 3 | 3 | |
| Netherlands | 14 | 12 | 1 (Wout Poels) |
| New Zealand | 2 | 2 | |
| Norway | 8 | 8 | |
| Poland | 2 | 2 | 1 (Michał Kwiatkowski) |
| Portugal | 3 | 2 | |
| Slovakia | 1 | 1 | |
| Slovenia | 3 | 3 | 3 (Matej Mohorič, Tadej Pogačar x2) |
| South Africa | 1 | 0 | |
| Spain | 14 | 10 | 3 (Pello Bilbao, Ion Izagirre, Carlos Rodríguez) |
| Switzerland | 2 | 2 | |
| United States | 6 | 4 | |
| Total | 176 | 150 | 21 |
