= 2024 La Flèche Wallonne =

Cycling race

2024 UCI World Tour, race 18 of 35
- Event poster

Race details
- Dates: 17 April 2024
- Stages: 1
- Distance: 199.1 km (123.7 mi)
- Winning time: 4h 40' 24"

Results
	Winner	Stephen Williams (GBR)	(Israel–Premier Tech)
	Second	Kévin Vauquelin (FRA)	(Arkéa–B&B Hotels)
	Third	Maxim Van Gils (BEL)	(Lotto–Dstny)

The 2024 La Flèche Wallonne was a road cycling one-day race that took place on 17 April from the Belgian city of Charleroi to the municipality of Huy. It was the 88th edition of La Flèche Wallonne and the 18th event of the 2024 UCI World Tour.

== Teams ==
All eighteen UCI WorldTeams and seven UCI ProTeams took part in the race. Only 44 riders finished the race out of 174 who started. Uno-X Mobility was the only team to have all seven riders complete the race.

UCI WorldTeams

- Alpecin–Deceuninck
- Arkéa–B&B Hotels
- Astana Qazaqstan Team
- Bora–Hansgrohe
- Cofidis
- Decathlon–AG2R La Mondiale
- EF Education–EasyPost
- Groupama–FDJ
- INEOS Grenadiers
- Intermarché–Wanty
- Lidl–Trek
- Movistar Team
- Soudal–Quick-Step
- Team Bahrain Victorious
- Team dsm–firmenich PostNL
- Team Jayco–AlUla
- UAE Team Emirates
- Visma–Lease a Bike

UCI ProTeams

- Bingoal WB
- Euskaltel–Euskadi
- Israel–Premier Tech
- Lotto–Dstny
- Q36.5 Pro Cycling Team
- Team TotalEnergies
- Uno-X Mobility

== Result ==
Result
Rank	Rider	Team	Time
1	Stephen Williams (GBR)	Israel–Premier Tech	4h 40' 24"
2	Kévin Vauquelin (FRA)	Arkéa–B&B Hotels	+ 0"
3	Maxim Van Gils (BEL)	Lotto–Dstny	+ 3"
4	Benoît Cosnefroy (FRA)	Decathlon–AG2R La Mondiale	+ 3"
5	Santiago Buitrago (COL)	Team Bahrain Victorious	+ 3"
6	Tobias Halland Johannessen (NOR)	Uno-X Mobility	+ 10"
7	Romain Grégoire (FRA)	Groupama–FDJ	+ 10"
8	Dorian Godon (FRA)	Decathlon–AG2R La Mondiale	+ 10"
9	Tiesj Benoot (BEL)	Visma–Lease a Bike	+ 10"
10	Guillaume Martin (FRA)	Cofidis	+ 10"
