= Vincent Van Hemelen =

Belgian cyclist

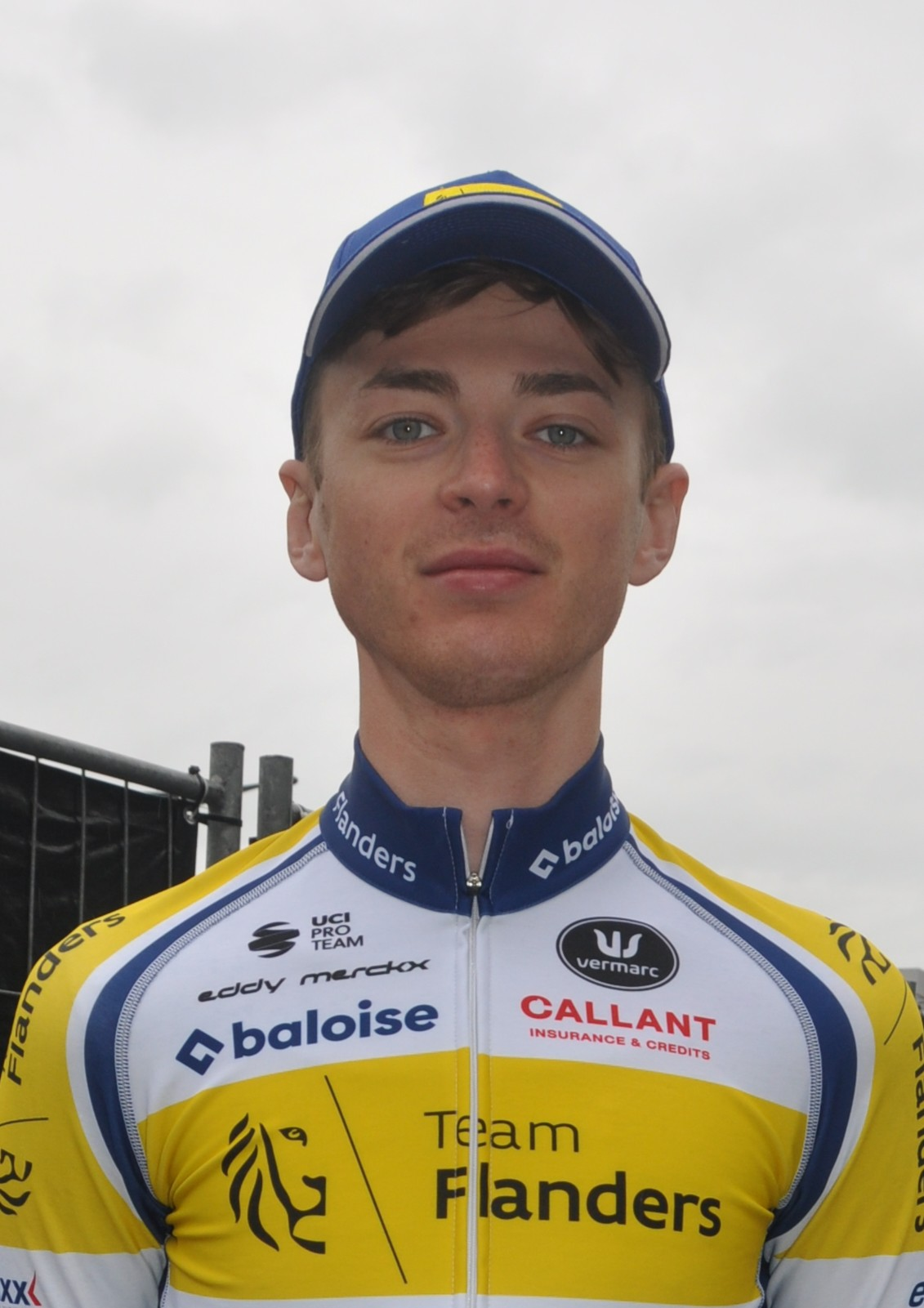
- Van Hemelen at the 2026 Rund um Köln

Personal information
- Born: 2 November 2000 (age 25) Herentals, Belgium
- Height: 1.91 m (6 ft 3 in)
- Weight: 69 kg (152 lb)

Cycling career
- Sport: Cycling
- Current team: Team Flanders–Baloise
- Discipline: Road
- Role: Rider

Amateur teams
- 2019: Aluvano Development Team
- 2020: GM Recycling
- 2021: Urbano Cycling Team
- 2022: Lotto–Soudal U23

Professional team
- 2023–: Team Flanders–Baloise

Vincent Van Hemelen (born 2 November 2000) is a Belgian racing cyclist, who currently rides for UCI ProTeam Team Flanders–Baloise. Van Hemelen completed a bachelor's degree in medicine at Hasselt and is currently studying for a master's degree at Leuven.

== Major results ==
2021
3rd Overall Flanders Tomorrow Tour
5th Time trial National Under-23 Road Championships
2022
1st Coppa Zappi – Trofeo Hotel Antico Borgo
7th Overall Le Triptyque des Monts et Châteaux
7th Coppa della Pace
10th Trofeo Città di Meldola
2023
1st Mountains classification, Arctic Race of Norway
2024
9th Famenne Ardenne Classic
2025
2nd Grand Prix La Marseillaise
8th Overall Étoile de Bessèges
10th Overall Tour of Norway
