= Michele Gazzoli =

Italian cyclist

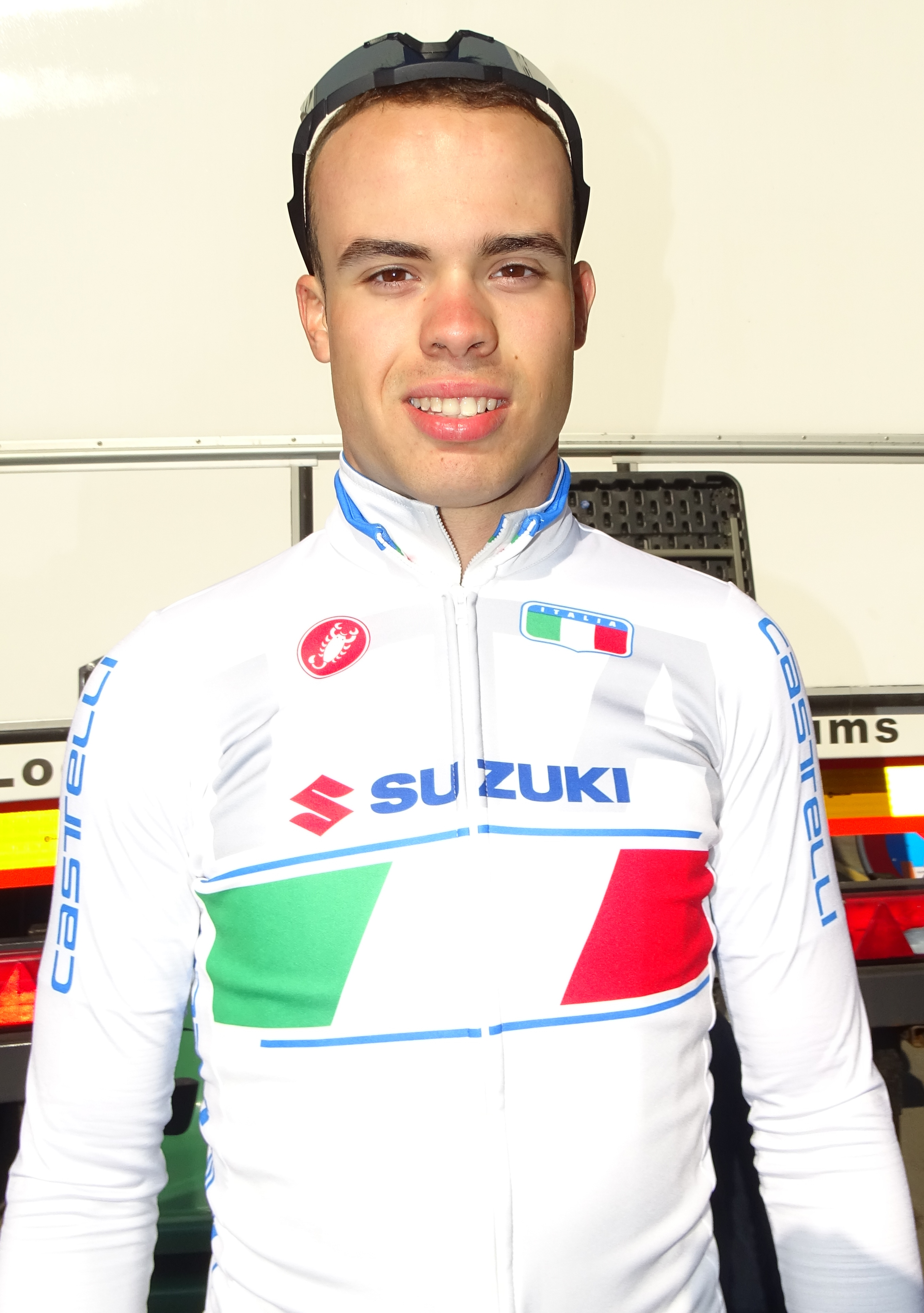
- Gazzoli at the 2017 Paris–Roubaix Espoirs

Personal information
- Born: 4 March 1999 (age 27) Ospitaletto, Italy
- Height: 1.80 m (5 ft 11 in)
- Weight: 76 kg (168 lb)

Cycling career
- Sport: Cycling
- Current team: XDS Astana Team
- Discipline: Road
- Role: Rider

Professional teams
- 2018–2019: Polartec–Kometa
- 2020–2021: Team Colpack–Ballan
- 2022: Astana Qazaqstan Team
- 2023: Astana Qazaqstan Development Team
- 2024–: Astana Qazaqstan Team

Michele Gazzoli (born 4 March 1999) is an Italian cyclist, who currently rides for UCI WorldTeam XDS Astana Team.

In August 2022, he was suspended for one year for the unintentional use of a banned substance, the decongestant Tuaminoheptane.

Upon his suspension ending, he joined Astana Qazaqstan Development Team. He won the second stage of the 2023 Arctic Race of Norway, his first race back, after being called up to ride with the WorldTour team.

== Major results ==
2016
1st Stage 2 Giro di Basilicata
2nd La Piccola Sanremo
3rd Ronde van Vlaanderen Juniores
9th Gent-Wevelgem Juniors
2017
1st Road race, UEC European Junior Road Championships
UEC European Junior Track Championships

1st Elimination race
3rd Scratch

1st Overall GP Général Patton

1st Points classification
1st Stage 1

2nd Ronde van Vlaanderen Juniores
3rd Road race, UCI Junior Road World Championships
8th La Piccola Sanremo
9th Gent-Wevelgem Juniors
2019
3rd L'Etoile d'Or
9th Road race, UEC European Under-23 Road Championships
2020
1st Gran Premio Ezio del Rosso
10th Road race, UEC European Under-23 Road Championships
2021
1st Gran Premio della Liberazione
1st Gran Premio Città di Empoli
4th Road race, UCI Road World Under-23 Championships
8th Trofej Umag
2023 (1 pro win)
1st Stage 2 Arctic Race of Norway
2nd Overall Tour of Bulgaria

1st Stages 1b & 5

=== Grand Tour general classification results timeline ===
| Grand Tour | 2024 |
|---|---|
| Giro d'Italia | — |
| Tour de France | DNF |
| Vuelta a España | — |

Legend
| — | Did not compete |
| DNF | Did not finish |
