= 2025 Grand Prix La Marseillaise =

2025 UCI Europe Tour

Race details
- Dates: 2 February 2025
- Distance: 164.2 km (102.0 mi)
- Winning time: 3h 57' 53"

Results
| | Winner | Valentin Ferron (FRA) | (Cofidis) |
| | Second | Vincent Van Hemelen (BEL) | (Team Flanders–Baloise) |
| | Third | Kiko Galván (ESP) | (Equipo Kern Pharma) |

The 2025 Grand Prix La Marseillaise was the 46th edition of the Grand Prix La Marseillaise cycle race. It was held on 2 February 2025 as a category 1.1 race on the 2025 UCI Europe Tour. The race started and finished in Marseille. The race was won by Valentin Ferron of Cofidis.

== Teams ==
Six UCI WorldTeams, ten UCI ProTeams, and five UCI Continental teams made up the 21 teams that entered the race.

UCI WorldTeams

- Alpecin–Deceuninck
- Arkéa–B&B Hotels
- Cofidis
- Decathlon–AG2R La Mondiale
- Groupama–FDJ
- Ineos Grenadiers

UCI ProTeams

- Burgos Burpellet BH
- Caja Rural–Seguros RGA
- Equipo Kern Pharma
- Euskaltel–Euskadi
- Lotto
- Unibet Tietema Rockets
- Team Flanders–Baloise
- Team Solution Tech–Vini Fantini
- Team TotalEnergies
- Wagner Bazin WB

UCI Continental Teams

- Beltrami TSA–Tre Colli
- CIC–U–Nantes
- Nice Métropole Côte d'Azur
- St. Michel–Preference Home–Auber93
- Van Rysel–Roubaix

== Result ==
Result
| Rank | Rider | Team | Time |
|---|---|---|---|
| 1 | Valentin Ferron (FRA) | Cofidis | 3h 57' 53" |
| 2 | Vincent Van Hemelen (BEL) | Team Flanders–Baloise | + 0" |
| 3 | Kiko Galván (ESP) | Equipo Kern Pharma | + 0" |
| 4 | Eduard Prades (ESP) | Caja Rural–Seguros RGA | + 0" |
| 5 | Paul Seixas (FRA) | Decathlon–AG2R La Mondiale | + 0" |
| 6 | Gotzon Martín (ESP) | Euskaltel–Euskadi | + 0" |
| 7 | Nicolas Prodhomme (FRA) | Decathlon–AG2R La Mondiale | + 0" |
| 8 | Axel Laurance (FRA) | Ineos Grenadiers | + 0" |
| 9 | Pau Miquel (ESP) | Equipo Kern Pharma | + 0" |
| 10 | Alex Molenaar (NED) | Caja Rural–Seguros RGA | + 0" |
