= Stephen Williams (cyclist) =

British cyclist

Stevie Williams
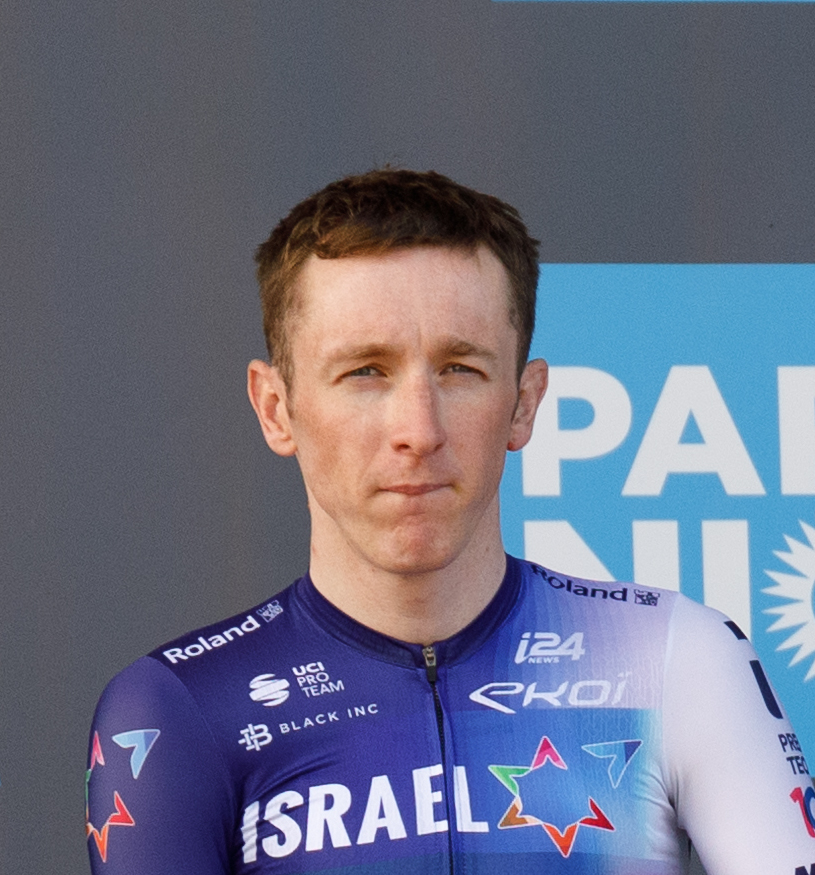
- Williams at the 2023 Paris–Nice

Personal information
- Full name: Stephen Williams
- Born: 9 June 1996 (age 30) Aberystwyth, Wales
- Height: 1.84 m (6 ft 0 in)
- Weight: 59 kg (130 lb)

Cycling career
- Sport: Cycling
- Current team: NSN Cycling Team
- Discipline: Road
- Role: Rider
- Rider type: Climber

Professional teams
- 2016: JLT–Condor
- 2017–2018: SEG Racing Academy
- 2018: Bahrain–Merida (stagiaire)
- 2019–2022: Bahrain–Merida
- 2023–: Israel–Premier Tech

Major wins
- Stage races Tour Down Under (2024) Tour of Britain (2024) Arctic Race of Norway (2023) One-day races and Classics La Flèche Wallonne (2024)

Stephen "Stevie" Williams (born 6 June 1996) is a Welsh professional cyclist who currently rides for UCI ProTeam NSN Cycling Team. His career wins include overall victories in the 2021 CRO Race, 2023 Arctic Race of Norway, the 2024 Tour Down Under and the one-day Ardennes classic La Flèche Wallonne in 2024.

== Career ==
After racing for JLT–Condor and SEG Racing Academy as an amateur, he joined Bahrain–Merida as a stagiaire in August 2018 and became a full member of the team in 2019.

Williams' pro career was put on hold for 18 months when he suffered a serious knee problem, undergoing surgery to remove the small fabella bone from his left knee in November 2019.

Along with Mark Cavendish, he had planned to join B&B Hotels–KTM for the 2023 season but the team collapsed before the season began. He later accepted an offer for 2023 from Israel–Premier Tech on a one-year contract, and remained with the team for 2024.

He competed for Great Britain at the 2024 Summer Olympics.

=== Race wins ===
Williams made his breakthrough in the 2018 Ronde de l'Isard, an under-23 event in France. Williams dominated the four-stage race, winning the first and second stages on his way to victory in both the general and mountain classifications. He also won stage five of the Giro Ciclistico d'Italia or "Baby Giro" in the same year.

His first professional victory was stage five of the 2021 CRO Race, a result that also gave him the lead of the race. He rode to the line in a three-rider breakaway on the sixth and final stage, finishing second on the day but sealing overall victory by seventeen seconds.

Williams achieved his first victory at UCI WorldTour level on stage one of the 2022 Tour de Suisse, sprinting to first in a strong group ahead of Maximilian Schachmann and Andreas Kron.

He claimed his second overall professional victory at the 2023 Arctic Race of Norway. Williams began Stage 3 in ninth position and won the stage to lead the race by one second over Christian Scaroni. Both riders finished the fourth and final stage in the leading group but neither gained bonus seconds which confirmed Williams as the overall winner.

Williams took his first overall victory in a UCI WorldTour race at the 2024 Tour Down Under. He took the race leaders' ochre jersey after finishing second behind Oscar Onley on stage 5, and confirmed overall victory by nine seconds over Jhonatan Narváez by winning the sixth and final stage atop Mount Lofty.

Having achieved his greatest successes in stage racing, Williams won the prestigious one-day Ardenne classic La Flèche Wallonne in April 2024. Raced in atrocious conditions that saw only 44 of the 174 riders finish the race, he came to the notoriously steep finish on Mur de Huy in the leading group and broke clear in the last few hundred metres, holding off Kevin Vauquelin for the win.

=== Grand Tour participation ===
Williams was selected by Bahrain–McLaren to ride his first Grand Tour at the 2020 Vuelta a España. He was in 155th place after stage 10 and withdrew from the race prior to stage 11. His next appearance in one of cycling's showpiece three-week races was at the 2023 Giro d'Italia. Despite relegation from the UCI WorldTour and failure to pre-qualify as one of the two best ProSeries teams in the previous year's points list, Israel–Premier Tech was given an unexpected invitation after both Lotto–Dstny and Team TotalEnergies declined their guaranteed wildcards. Williams finished the race in 93rd place and recorded his highest Grand Tour stage result to date, sprinting to 12th place in the final stage around Rome.

On 21 June 2024, Israel-PremierTech announced that Williams had been selected to ride in the 2024 Tour de France, his debut in the event.

== Major results ==
2016
1st Stage 1 Suir Valley 3 Day International
3rd Overall New Zealand Cycle Classic
2017
2nd Flèche Ardennaise
2018
1st Overall Ronde de l'Isard

1st Mountains classification
1st Stages 1 & 2

4th Ronde van Zuid-Holland
5th Overall Giro Ciclistico d'Italia

1st Stage 7

9th Liège–Bastogne–Liège Espoirs
2021 (2 pro wins)
1st Overall CRO Race

1st Stage 5

2022 (1)
1st Stage 1 Tour de Suisse
2023 (2)
1st Overall Arctic Race of Norway

1st Stage 3

3rd Road race, National Road Championships
8th Eschborn–Frankfurt
2024 (6)
1st Overall Tour of Britain

1st Stages 2 & 3

1st Overall Tour Down Under

1st Stage 6

1st La Flèche Wallonne

=== Grand Tour general classification results timeline ===
Grand Tour	2020	2021	2022	2023	2024
Giro d'Italia	—	—	—	92	—
Tour de France	—	—	—	—	73
Vuelta a España	DNF	—	—	—	—

=== Classics results timeline ===
Monument	2020	2021	2022	2023	2024	2025
Milan–San Remo	—	—	—	—	—	—
Tour of Flanders	—	—	—	—	—	—
Paris–Roubaix	NH	—	—	—	—	—
Liège–Bastogne–Liège	—	—	—	—	66	DNF
Giro di Lombardia	—	DNF	—	DNF	—	—
Classic	2020	2021	2022	2023	2024	2025
Strade Bianche	—	—	—	—	75	—
Brabantse Pijl	DNF	65	—	—	55	—
Amstel Gold Race	—	117	—	—	43	—
La Flèche Wallonne	116	DNF	99	—	1	DNF
Eschborn–Frankfurt	NH	—	—	8	—	DNF
Clásica de San Sebastián	NH	53	—	62	—	—
Bretagne Classic	—	23	139	—	—	—

Legend
—	Did not compete
DNF	Did not finish
