= 2023 Arctic Race of Norway =

2023 UCI ProSeries

Race details
- Dates: 17 – 20 August 2023
- Stages: 4
- Distance: 663 km (412.0 mi)
- Winning time: 15h 38' 06"

Results
Jersey awarded to the overall winner	Winner	Stephen Williams (GBR)	(Israel–Premier Tech)
	Second	Christian Scaroni (ITA)	(Astana Qazaqstan Team)
	Third	Kevin Vermaerke (USA)	(Team dsm–firmenich)
Jersey awarded to the points classification winner	Points	Clément Champoussin (FRA)	(Arkéa–Samsic)
Jersey awarded to the mountains classification winner	Mountains	Vincent Van Hemelen (BEL)	(Team Flanders–Baloise)
Jersey awarded to the youth classification winner	Youth	Kevin Vermaerke (USA)	(Team dsm–firmenich)
	Team	Israel–Premier Tech	

The 2023 Arctic Race of Norway was a road cycling stage race that took place between 17 and 20 August 2023. It was the tenth edition of the Arctic Race of Norway, which was rated as a 2.Pro event on the 2023 UCI ProSeries calendar.

== Teams ==
Six UCI WorldTeams, eight UCI ProTeams, three UCI Continental teams, and one national team made up the eighteen teams that participated in the race.

UCI WorldTeams

- Arkéa–Samsic
- Astana Qazaqstan Team
- Cofidis
- Lidl–Trek
- Team dsm–firmenich
- Team Jayco–AlUla

UCI ProTeams

- Bingoal WB
- Burgos BH
- Equipo Kern Pharma
- Human Powered Health
- Israel–Premier Tech
- Q36.5 Pro Cycling Team
- Team Flanders–Baloise
- Uno-X Pro Cycling Team

UCI Continental Teams

- Groupama–FDJ Continental Team
- Team Coop–Repsol
- Trinity Racing

National Teams

- Norway

== Route ==
Stage characteristics and winners
Stage	Date	Course	Distance	Type	Stage winner
1	17 August	Kautokeino to Alta	171 km (106 mi)	Flat stage	Alberto Dainese (ITA)
2	18 August	Alta to Hammerfest	153.5 km (95.4 mi)	Flat stage	Michele Gazzoli (ITA)
3	19 August	Hammerfest to Havøysund summit	167 km (104 mi)	Hilly stage	Stephen Williams (GBR)
4	20 August	Kvalsund to Nordkapp	171.5 km (106.6 mi)	Hilly stage	Clément Champoussin (FRA)
Total			663 km (412 mi)		

== Stages ==
=== Stage 1 ===
17 August 2023 – Kautokeino to Alta, 171 km (106 mi)

Stage 1 Result
Rank	Rider	Team	Time
1	Alberto Dainese (ITA)	Team dsm–firmenich	4h 06' 07"
2	Noah Hobbs (GBR)	Groupama–FDJ Continental Team	+ 0"
3	Clément Champoussin (FRA)	Arkéa–Samsic	+ 0"
4	Marc Brustenga (ESP)	Lidl–Trek	+ 0"
5	Antonio Angulo (ESP)	Burgos BH	+ 0"
6	Kévin Ledanois (FRA)	Arkéa–Samsic	+ 0"
7	August Jensen (NOR)	Human Powered Health	+ 0"
8	Martin Urianstad (NOR)	Uno-X Pro Cycling Team	+ 0"
9	Marco Tizza (ITA)	Bingoal WB	+ 0"
10	Colin Joyce (USA)	Human Powered Health	+ 0"

General classification after Stage 1
Rank	Rider	Team	Time
1	Alberto Dainese (ITA)	Team dsm–firmenich	4h 05' 57"
2	Noah Hobbs (GBR)	Groupama–FDJ Continental Team	+ 4"
3	Lewis Bower (NZL)	Groupama–FDJ Continental Team	+ 4"
4	Clément Champoussin (FRA)	Arkéa–Samsic	+ 6"
5	Tobias Halland Johannessen (NOR)	Uno-X Pro Cycling Team	+ 7"
6	Stephen Williams (GBR)	Israel–Premier Tech	+ 8"
7	Fergus Browning (AUS)	Trinity Racing	+ 8"
8	Christian Scaroni (ITA)	Astana Qazaqstan Team	+ 9"
9	Marc Brustenga (ESP)	Lidl–Trek	+ 10"
10	Antonio Angulo (ESP)	Burgos BH	+ 10"

=== Stage 2 ===
18 August 2023 – Alta to Hammerfest, 153.5 km (95.4 mi)

Stage 2 Result
Rank	Rider	Team	Time
1	Michele Gazzoli (ITA)	Astana Qazaqstan Team	3h 28' 35"
2	Christian Scaroni (ITA)	Astana Qazaqstan Team	+ 0"
3	Jonathan Lastra (ESP)	Cofidis	+ 0"
4	Thibaud Gruel (FRA)	Groupama–FDJ Continental Team	+ 0"
5	Milan Fretin (BEL)	Team Flanders–Baloise	+ 0"
6	Kevin Vermaerke (USA)	Team dsm–firmenich	+ 0"
7	Elias Maris (BEL)	Team Flanders–Baloise	+ 0"
8	Tobias Halland Johannessen (NOR)	Uno-X Pro Cycling Team	+ 0"
9	Dylan Teuns (BEL)	Israel–Premier Tech	+ 0"
10	André Drege (NOR)	Team Coop–Repsol	+ 0"

General classification after Stage 2
Rank	Rider	Team	Time
1	Noah Hobbs (GBR)	Groupama–FDJ Continental Team	7h 34' 31"
2	Alberto Dainese (ITA)	Team dsm–firmenich	+ 1"
3	Michele Gazzoli (ITA)	Astana Qazaqstan Team	+ 1"
4	Lewis Bower (NZL)	Groupama–FDJ Continental Team	+ 3"
5	Christian Scaroni (ITA)	Astana Qazaqstan Team	+ 4"
6	Jonathan Lastra (ESP)	Cofidis	+ 7"
7	André Drege (NOR)	Team Coop–Repsol	+ 8"
8	Tobias Halland Johannessen (NOR)	Uno-X Pro Cycling Team	+ 8"
9	Stephen Williams (GBR)	Israel–Premier Tech	+ 9"
10	Fergus Browning (AUS)	Trinity Racing	+ 9"

=== Stage 3 ===
19 August 2023 – Hammerfest to Havøysund summit, 167 km (104 mi)

Stage 3 Result
Rank	Rider	Team	Time
1	Stephen Williams (GBR)	Israel–Premier Tech	4h 02' 58"
2	Clément Champoussin (FRA)	Arkéa–Samsic	+ 0"
3	Christian Scaroni (ITA)	Astana Qazaqstan Team	+ 0"
4	Tobias Halland Johannessen (NOR)	Uno-X Pro Cycling Team	+ 0"
5	Dylan Teuns (BEL)	Israel–Premier Tech	+ 0"
6	Roger Adrià (ESP)	Equipo Kern Pharma	+ 0"
7	Matthew Dinham (AUS)	Team dsm–firmenich	+ 0"
8	Guillaume Martin (FRA)	Cofidis	+ 0"
9	Kevin Vermaerke (USA)	Team dsm–firmenich	+ 0"
10	Kamiel Bonneu (BEL)	Team Flanders–Baloise	+ 7"

General classification after Stage 3
Rank	Rider	Team	Time
1	Stephen Williams (GBR)	Israel–Premier Tech	11h 37' 28"
2	Christian Scaroni (ITA)	Astana Qazaqstan Team	+ 1"
3	Tobias Halland Johannessen (NOR)	Uno-X Pro Cycling Team	+ 9"
4	Kevin Vermaerke (USA)	Team dsm–firmenich	+ 11"
5	Dylan Teuns (BEL)	Israel–Premier Tech	+ 12"
6	Matthew Dinham (AUS)	Team dsm–firmenich	+ 12"
7	Guillaume Martin (FRA)	Cofidis	+ 12"
8	Roger Adrià (ESP)	Equipo Kern Pharma	+ 12"
9	Kamiel Bonneu (BEL)	Team Flanders–Baloise	+ 19"
10	Cedrik Bakke Christophersen (NOR)	Team Coop–Repsol	+ 20"

=== Stage 4 ===
20 August 2023 – Kvalsund to Nordkapp, 171.5 km (106.6 mi)

Stage 4 Result
Rank	Rider	Team	Time
1	Clément Champoussin (FRA)	Arkéa–Samsic	4h 00' 38"
2	Odd Christian Eiking (NOR)	Norway	+ 0"
3	Michele Gazzoli (ITA)	Astana Qazaqstan Team	+ 0"
4	Tobias Halland Johannessen (NOR)	Uno-X Pro Cycling Team	+ 0"
5	Matthew Dinham (AUS)	Team dsm–firmenich	+ 0"
6	Christian Scaroni (ITA)	Astana Qazaqstan Team	+ 0"
7	Kamiel Bonneu (BEL)	Team Flanders–Baloise	+ 0"
8	Dylan Teuns (BEL)	Israel–Premier Tech	+ 0"
9	Kevin Vermaerke (USA)	Team dsm–firmenich	+ 0"
10	Stephen Williams (GBR)	Israel–Premier Tech	+ 0"

General classification after Stage 4
Rank	Rider	Team	Time
1	Stephen Williams (GBR)	Israel–Premier Tech	15h 38' 06"
2	Christian Scaroni (ITA)	Astana Qazaqstan Team	+ 1"
3	Kevin Vermaerke (USA)	Team dsm–firmenich	+ 9"
4	Tobias Halland Johannessen (NOR)	Uno-X Pro Cycling Team	+ 9"
5	Dylan Teuns (BEL)	Israel–Premier Tech	+ 11"
6	Matthew Dinham (AUS)	Team dsm–firmenich	+ 12"
7	Guillaume Martin (FRA)	Cofidis	+ 12"
8	Roger Adrià (ESP)	Equipo Kern Pharma	+ 12"
9	Kamiel Bonneu (BEL)	Team Flanders–Baloise	+ 19"
10	Cedrik Bakke Christophersen (NOR)	Team Coop–Repsol	+ 20"

== Classification leadership table ==
Classification leadership by stage
Stage	Winner	General classification	Points classification	Mountains classification	Young rider classification	Team classification	Combativity award
1	Alberto Dainese	Alberto Dainese	Alberto Dainese	Vincent Van Hemelen	Alberto Dainese	Arkéa–Samsic	Johan Ravnøy
2	Michele Gazzoli	Noah Hobbs	Noah Hobbs	Vincent Van Hemelen	Noah Hobbs	Astana Qazaqstan Team	not awarded
3	Stephen Williams	Stephen Williams	Christian Scaroni	Vincent Van Hemelen	Tobias Halland Johannessen	Israel–Premier Tech	Vincent Van Hemelen
4	Clément Champoussin	Stephen Williams	Clément Champoussin	Vincent Van Hemelen	Kevin Vermaerke	Israel–Premier Tech	Christian Scaroni
Final		Stephen Williams	Clément Champoussin	Vincent Van Hemelen	Kevin Vermaerke	Israel–Premier Tech	not awarded

== Classification standings ==
Legend
Denotes the winner of the general classification	Denotes the winner of the young rider classification
Denotes the winner of the points classification	Denotes the winner of the team classification
Denotes the winner of the mountains classification	Denotes the winner of the combativity award

=== General classification ===
Final general classification (1–10)
Rank	Rider	Team	Time
1	Stephen Williams (GBR)	Israel–Premier Tech	15h 38' 06"
2	Christian Scaroni (ITA)	Astana Qazaqstan Team	+ 1"
3	Kevin Vermaerke (USA)	Team dsm–firmenich	+ 9"
4	Tobias Halland Johannessen (NOR)	Uno-X Pro Cycling Team	+ 9"
5	Dylan Teuns (BEL)	Israel–Premier Tech	+ 11"
6	Matthew Dinham (AUS)	Team dsm–firmenich	+ 12"
7	Guillaume Martin (FRA)	Cofidis	+ 12"
8	Roger Adrià (ESP)	Equipo Kern Pharma	+ 12"
9	Kamiel Bonneu (BEL)	Team Flanders–Baloise	+ 19"
10	Cedrik Bakke Christophersen (NOR)	Team Coop–Repsol	+ 20"

=== Points classification ===
Final points classification (1–10)
Rank	Rider	Team	Points
1	Clément Champoussin (FRA)	Arkéa–Samsic	36
2	Christian Scaroni (ITA)	Astana Qazaqstan Team	27
3	Noah Hobbs (GBR)	Groupama–FDJ Continental Team	26
4	Michele Gazzoli (ITA)	Astana Qazaqstan Team	24
5	Tobias Halland Johannessen (NOR)	Uno-X Pro Cycling Team	20
6	Stephen Williams (GBR)	Israel–Premier Tech	18
7	Alberto Dainese (ITA)	Team dsm–firmenich	15
8	Kevin Vermaerke (USA)	Team dsm–firmenich	12
9	Dylan Teuns (BEL)	Israel–Premier Tech	12
10	Odd Christian Eiking (NOR)	Norway	12

=== Mountains classification ===
Final mountains classification (1–10)
Rank	Rider	Team	Points
1	Vincent Van Hemelen (BEL)	Team Flanders–Baloise	26
2	Johan Ravnøy (NOR)	Team Coop–Repsol	9
3	Stephen Williams (GBR)	Israel–Premier Tech	6
4	Walter Calzoni (ITA)	Q36.5 Pro Cycling Team	6
5	Lewis Bower (NZL)	Groupama–FDJ Continental Team	6
6	Fergus Browning (AUS)	Trinity Racing	6
7	Michel Ries (LUX)	Arkéa–Samsic	5
8	Cedrik Bakke Christophersen (DEN)	Team Coop–Repsol	4
9	Asbjørn Hellemose (DEN)	Lidl–Trek	4
10	Clément Champoussin (FRA)	Arkéa–Samsic	4

=== Young rider classification ===
Final young rider classification (1–10)
Rank	Rider	Team	Time
1	Kevin Vermaerke (USA)	Team dsm–firmenich	15h 38' 15"
2	Tobias Halland Johannessen (NOR)	Uno-X Pro Cycling Team	+ 0"
3	Matthew Dinham (AUS)	Team dsm–firmenich	+ 3"
4	Roger Adrià (ESP)	Equipo Kern Pharma	+ 3"
5	Kamiel Bonneu (BEL)	Team Flanders–Baloise	+ 10"
6	Cedrik Bakke Christophersen (NOR)	Team Coop–Repsol	+ 11"
7	Liam Johnston (AUS)	Trinity Racing	+ 14"
8	Asbjørn Hellemose (DEN)	Lidl–Trek	+ 18"
9	Louis Barré (FRA)	Arkéa–Samsic	+ 19"
10	Elias Maris (BEL)	Team Flanders–Baloise	+ 22"

=== Team classification ===
Final team classification (1–10)
Rank	Team	Time
1	Israel–Premier Tech	46h 55' 54"
2	(France) Cofidis	+ 1' 02"
3	(Spain) Equipo Kern Pharma	+ 1' 14"
4	(Norway) Uno-X Pro Cycling Team	+ 1' 45"
5	(Switzerland) Q36.5 Pro Cycling Team	+ 1' 50"
6	(Belgium) Team Flanders–Baloise	+ 2' 29"
7	(Spain) Burgos BH	+ 3' 53"
8	(Netherlands) Team dsm–firmenich	+ 4' 02"
9	(Norway) Team Coop–Repsol	+ 8' 05"
10	(Belgium) Bingoal WB	+ 9' 05"
