= Matthew Dinham =

Australian cyclist (born 2000)

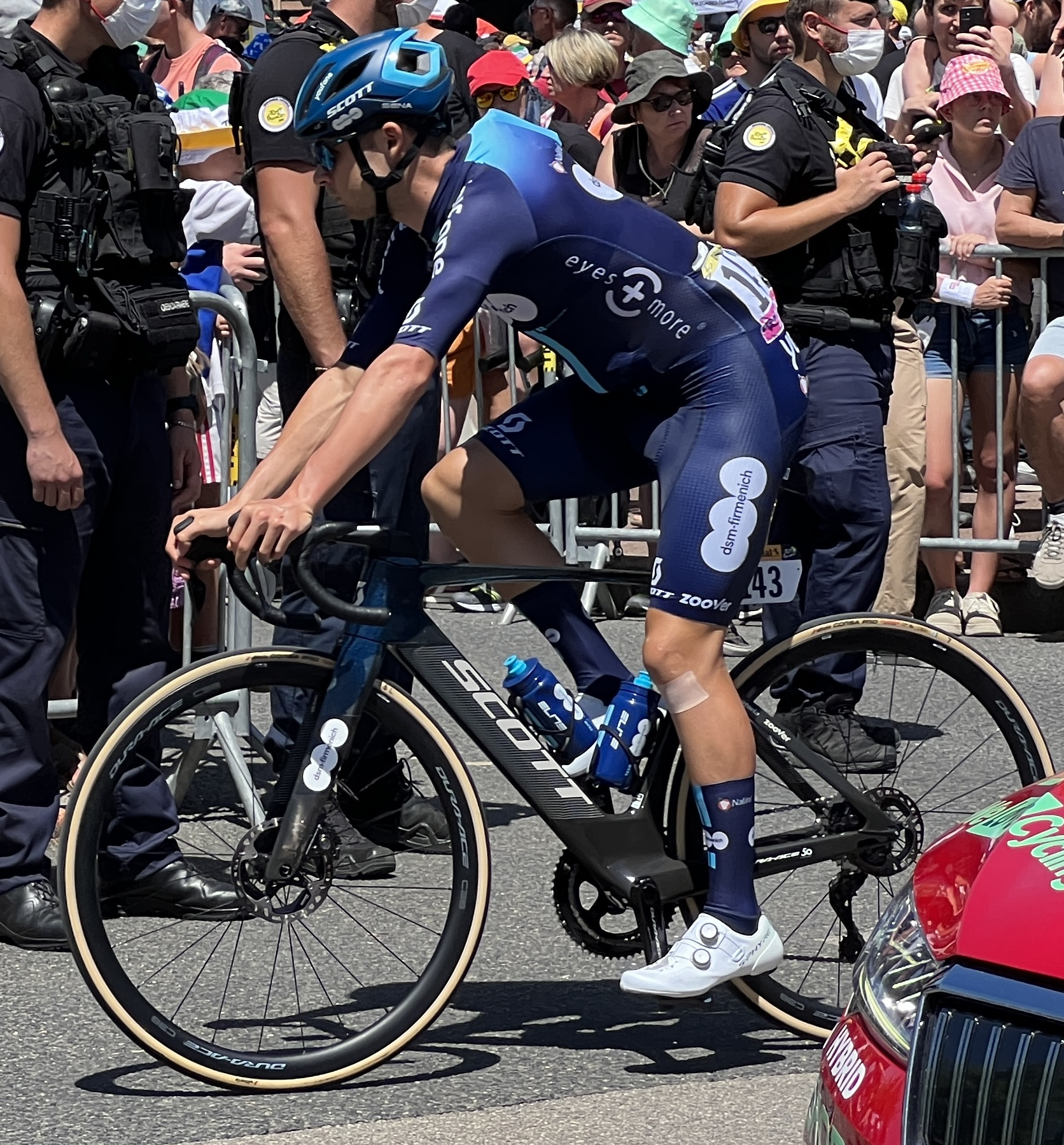
- Dinham at the 2023 Tour de France

Personal information
- Born: 9 April 2000 (age 26) South Africa
- Height: 1.75 m (5 ft 9 in)
- Weight: 63 kg (139 lb)

Cycling career
- Sport: Cycling
- Current team: Team Picnic–PostNL
- Disciplines: Road; Mountain biking
- Role: Rider

Professional teams
- 2019: St George Continental Cycling Team
- 2020–2022: Team BridgeLane
- 2023–: Team DSM

Matthew Dinham (born 9 April 2000) is an Australian cyclist, who currently rides for UCI WorldTeam Team Picnic–PostNL.

== Early life ==
Dinham was born in South Africa and lived there until he was 11. He started riding at the age of four, trying most of the other disciplines of cycling before settling on road. Dinham became an Australia citizen in 2017 a few weeks before he represented Australia at the UCI Mountain Bike World Championships

== Career ==
Dinham sprinted to seventh at the UCI World Under-23 Championships Road race in 2022.

=== DSM 2023 to present ===
The first Grand Tour that Dinham rode was the 2023 Tour de France where he rode in support of Romain Bardet. He finished the race in 58th and ninth in the Young rider classification.

Dinam was a last minute call up for the Road race at the 2023 UCI Road World Championships after Caleb Ewan decided not to race. The race plan for Dinham involved going into the early break and take some of the pressure off Michael Matthews. But Matthews dropped out of contention so Dinham took it upon himself to get a good placing. When the favorites caught his breakaway, Mathieu van der Poel attacked. Dinham was the only rider from the break to be able to follow, he joined the likes of Wout van Aert and Tadej Pogačar. Van der Poel kept attacking and the bunch split into groups with Dinham being in the bunch that sprinted for fifth where he finished seventh.

After an injury-plagued 2024/25, Dinham returned to racing at the end of 2025 and came 5th in the 2026 Australian National Road Race.

== Major results ==
=== Mountain bike ===
2017
2nd Cross-country, Oceanian Junior Championships
2018
2nd Cross-country, Oceanian Junior Championships
2019
1st Cross-country, Oceanian Under-23 Championships
2020
3rd Cross-country, Oceanian Under-23 Championships
2022
1st Cross-country, National Championships

=== Road ===
2021
8th Overall Tour de Bretagne
8th Lillehammer GP
2022
1st La Maurienne Classic
National Under-23 Championships

2nd Road race
2nd Time trial

5th Time trial, Oceania Under-23 Championships
5th Overall Tour de la Mirabelle
6th Road race, Oceania Championships
7th Road race, UCI World Under-23 Championships
7th Overall Tour du Pays de Montbéliard
9th Overall Tour Alsace
9th Overall Spirit of Tasmania Cycle Tour
2023
6th Overall Arctic Race of Norway
7th Road race, UCI World Championships
8th Overall CRO Race
2026
5th Road race, National Championships

==== Grand Tour general classification results timeline ====
Grand Tour	2023
Giro d'Italia	—
Tour de France	58
Vuelta a España	—

Legend
—	Did not compete
DNF	Did not finish
IP	Race in Progress
