= 2023 Tour de France, Stage 12 to Stage 21 =

The 2023 Tour de France is the 110th edition of the Tour de France. It started in Bilbao, Spain on 1 July and will finish with the final stage at Champs-Élysées, Paris on 23 July.

== Classification standings ==
Legend
Denotes the leader of the general classification	Denotes the leader of the mountains classification
Denotes the leader of the points classification	Denotes the leader of the young rider classification
Denotes the leader of the team classification	Denotes the winner of the combativity award

== Stage 12 ==
13 July 2023 – Roanne to Belleville-en-Beaujolais, 169 km (105 mi)

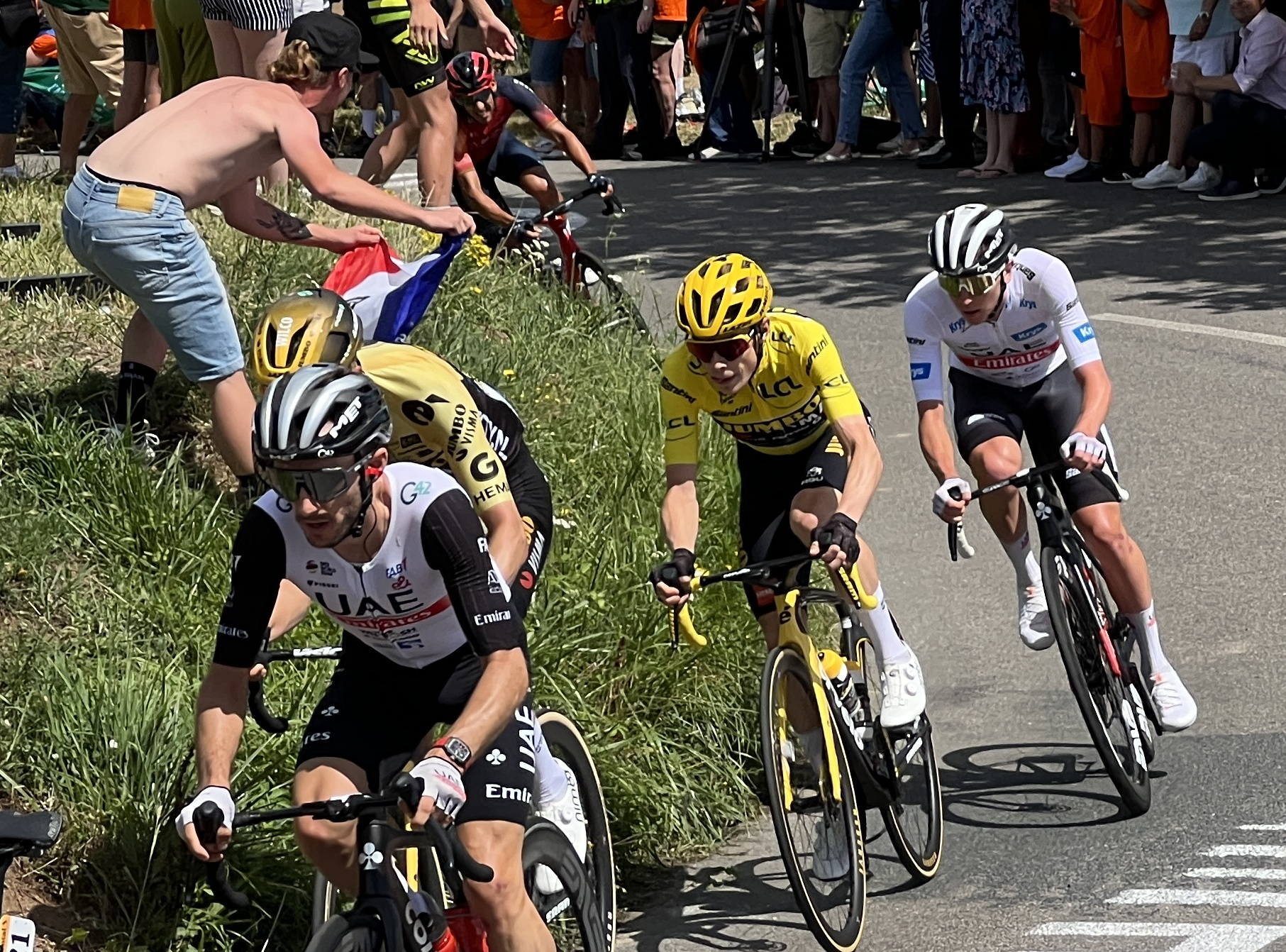
The group of favourites containing Jonas Vingegaard and Tadej Pogačar during stage 12

Ion Izagirre (Cofidis) escaped solo in the last 30 km (19 mi) towards Belleville en Beaujolais to win Cofidis' second stage of the Tour.

Stage 12 Result
Rank	Rider	Team	Time
1	Ion Izagirre (ESP)	Cofidis	3h 51' 42"
2	Mathieu Burgaudeau (FRA)	Team TotalEnergies	+ 58"
3	Matteo Jorgenson (USA)	Movistar Team	+ 58"
4	Tiesj Benoot (BEL)	Team Jumbo–Visma	+ 1' 06"
5	Tobias Halland Johannessen (NOR)	Uno-X Pro Cycling Team	+ 1' 11"
6	Thibaut Pinot (FRA)	Groupama–FDJ	+ 1' 13"
7	Guillaume Martin (FRA)	Cofidis	+ 1' 13"
8	Dylan Teuns (BEL)	Israel–Premier Tech	+ 1' 27"
9	Ruben Guerreiro (POR)	Movistar Team	+ 1' 27"
10	Victor Campenaerts (BEL)	Lotto–Dstny	+ 3' 02"

General classification after Stage 12
Rank	Rider	Team	Time
1	Jonas Vingegaard (DEN)	Team Jumbo–Visma	50h 30' 23"
2	Tadej Pogačar (SLO)	UAE Team Emirates	+ 17"
3	Jai Hindley (AUS)	Bora–Hansgrohe	+ 2' 40"
4	Carlos Rodriguez (ESP)	Ineos Grenadiers	+ 4' 22"
5	Pello Bilbao (ESP)	Team Bahrain Victorious	+ 4' 34"
6	Adam Yates (GBR)	UAE Team Emirates	+ 4' 39"
7	Simon Yates (GBR)	Team Jayco–AlUla	+ 4' 44"
8	Tom Pidcock (GBR)	Ineos Grenadiers	+ 5' 26"
9	David Gaudu (FRA)	Groupama–FDJ	+ 6' 01"
10	Thibaut Pinot (FRA)	Groupama–FDJ	+ 6' 33"

== Stage 13 ==
14 July 2023 – Châtillon-sur-Chalaronne to Grand Colombier, 138 km (86 mi)

Michał Kwiatkowski (Ineos Grenadiers) won stage 13 after breaking away on his own 11 km (6.8 mi) from the finish at the top of the Grand Colombier. Pogačar cut Vingegaard's lead to nine seconds.

Stage 13 Result
Rank	Rider	Team	Time
1	Michał Kwiatkowski (POL)	Ineos Grenadiers	3h 17' 33"
2	Maxim Van Gils (BEL)	Lotto–Dstny	+ 47"
3	Tadej Pogačar (SLO)	UAE Team Emirates	+ 50"
4	Jonas Vingegaard (DEN)	Team Jumbo–Visma	+ 54"
5	Tom Pidcock (GBR)	Ineos Grenadiers	+ 1' 03"
6	Jai Hindley (AUS)	Bora–Hansgrohe	+ 1' 05"
7	James Shaw (GBR)	EF Education–EasyPost	+ 1' 05"
8	Harold Tejada (COL)	Astana Qazaqstan Team	+ 1' 05"
9	Simon Yates (GBR)	Team Jayco–AlUla	+ 1' 14"
10	Adam Yates (GBR)	UAE Team Emirates	+ 1' 18"

General classification after Stage 13
Rank	Rider	Team	Time
1	Jonas Vingegaard (DEN)	Team Jumbo–Visma	53h 48' 50"
2	Tadej Pogačar (SLO)	UAE Team Emirates	+ 9"
3	Jai Hindley (AUS)	Bora–Hansgrohe	+ 2' 51"
4	Carlos Rodriguez (ESP)	Ineos Grenadiers	+ 4' 48"
5	Adam Yates (GBR)	UAE Team Emirates	+ 5' 03"
6	Simon Yates (GBR)	Team Jayco–AlUla	+ 5' 04"
7	Pello Bilbao (ESP)	Team Bahrain Victorious	+ 5' 25"
8	Tom Pidcock (GBR)	Ineos Grenadiers	+ 5' 35"
9	David Gaudu (FRA)	Groupama–FDJ	+ 6' 52"
10	Sepp Kuss (USA)	Team Jumbo–Visma	+ 7' 11"

== Stage 14 ==
15 July 2023 – Annemasse to Morzine, 152 km (94 mi)

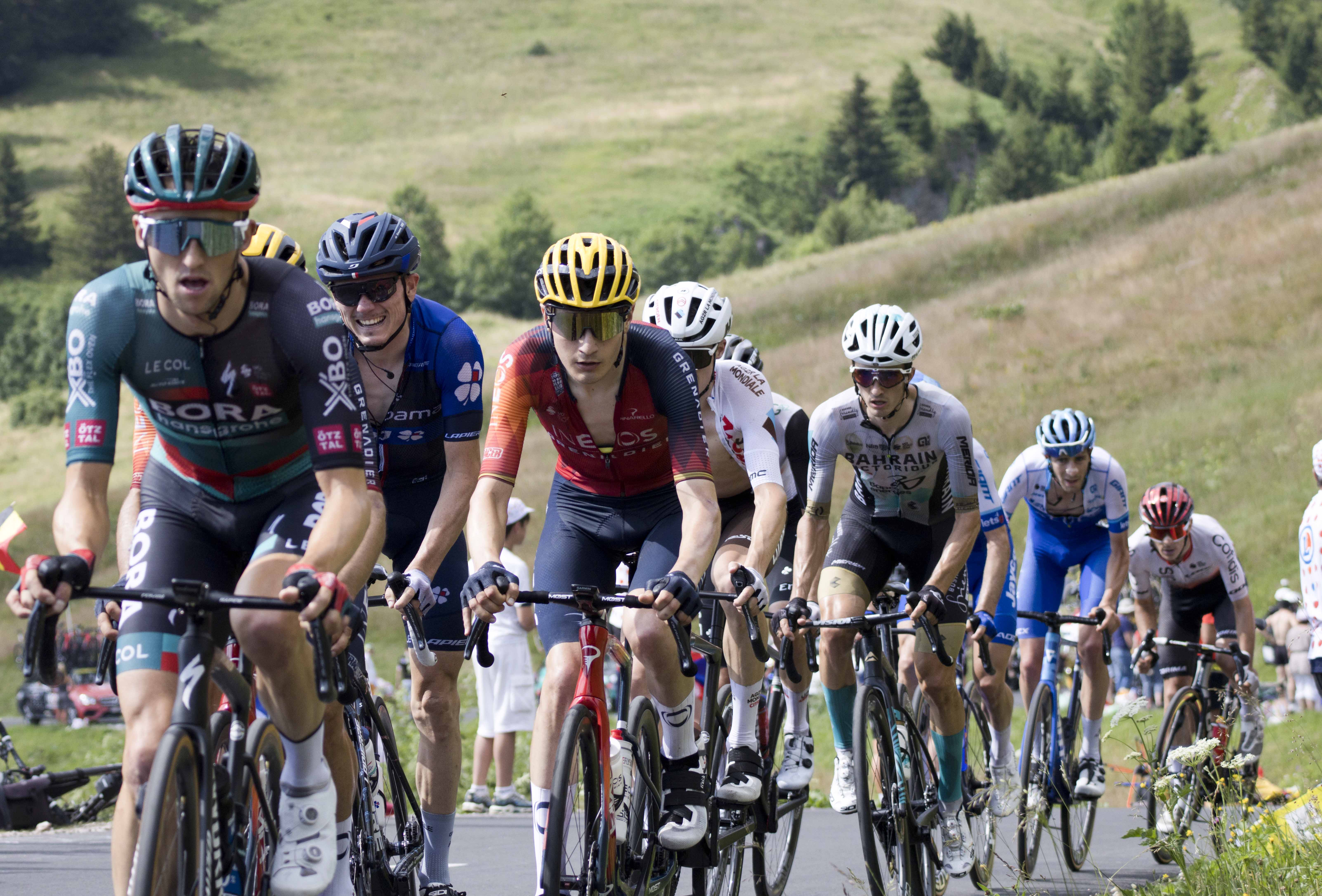
Group of riders including stage winner Carlos Rodríguez (Ineos Grenadiers)

An early 13-rider crash led race officials to suspend the stage for 30 minutes and caused several riders to abandon the Tour. On the climb to the Col de Joux Plane, Pogačar and Vingegaard led the stage. Pogačar attacked about 2 km (1.2 mi) from the top of the climb, but Vingegaard recovered and caught up with him; Pogačar's next attack was stymied by media motorcycles crowding the road. Carlos Rodríguez (Ineos Grenadiers) caught Vingegaard and Pogačar during the final descent and went on to win the stage, moving one second ahead of Jai Hindley into third place overall.

Stage 14 Result
Rank	Rider	Team	Time
1	Carlos Rodriguez (ESP)	Ineos Grenadiers	3h 58' 45"
2	Tadej Pogačar (SLO)	UAE Team Emirates	+ 5"
3	Jonas Vingegaard (DEN)	Team Jumbo–Visma	+ 5"
4	Adam Yates (GBR)	UAE Team Emirates	+ 10"
5	Sepp Kuss (USA)	Team Jumbo–Visma	+ 57"
6	Jai Hindley (AUS)	Bora–Hansgrohe	+ 1' 46"
7	Felix Gall (AUT)	AG2R Citroën Team	+ 1' 46"
8	Pello Bilbao (ESP)	Team Bahrain Victorious	+ 3' 19"
9	Simon Yates (GBR)	Team Jayco–AlUla	+ 3' 21"
10	Guillaume Martin (FRA)	Cofidis	+ 5' 57"

General classification after Stage 14
Rank	Rider	Team	Time
1	Jonas Vingegaard (DEN)	Team Jumbo–Visma	57h 47' 28"
2	Tadej Pogačar (SLO)	UAE Team Emirates	+ 10"
3	Carlos Rodriguez (ESP)	Ineos Grenadiers	+ 4' 43"
4	Jai Hindley (AUS)	Bora–Hansgrohe	+ 4' 44"
5	Adam Yates (GBR)	UAE Team Emirates	+ 5' 20"
6	Sepp Kuss (USA)	Team Jumbo–Visma	+ 8' 15"
7	Simon Yates (GBR)	Team Jayco–AlUla	+ 8' 32"
8	Pello Bilbao (ESP)	Team Bahrain Victorious	+ 8' 51"
9	Felix Gall (AUT)	AG2R Citroën Team	+ 12' 26"
10	David Gaudu (FRA)	Groupama–FDJ	+ 12' 56"

== Stage 15 ==
16 July 2023 – Les Gets to Saint-Gervais-les-Bains, 179 km (111 mi)

Wout Poels (Team Bahrain Victorious) soloed to victory after he broke away 11 km (6.8 mi) from the finish line on the penultimate climb of the Côtes des Amerands. It was his first Tour de France stage win.

Stage 15 Result
Rank	Rider	Team	Time
1	Wout Poels (NED)	Team Bahrain Victorious	4h 40' 45"
2	Wout van Aert (BEL)	Team Jumbo–Visma	+ 2' 08"
3	Mathieu Burgaudeau (FRA)	Team TotalEnergies	+ 3' 00"
4	Lawson Craddock (USA)	Team Jayco–AlUla	+ 3' 10"
5	Mikel Landa (ESP)	Team Bahrain Victorious	+ 3' 14"
6	Thibaut Pinot (FRA)	Groupama–FDJ	+ 3' 14"
7	Guillaume Martin (FRA)	Cofidis	+ 3' 32"
8	Mattias Skjelmose (DEN)	Lidl–Trek	+ 3' 43"
9	Simon Guglielmi (FRA)	Arkéa–Samsic	+ 3' 59"
10	Warren Barguil (FRA)	Arkéa–Samsic	+ 4' 20"

General classification after Stage 15
Rank	Rider	Team	Time
1	Jonas Vingegaard (DEN)	Team Jumbo–Visma	62h 34' 17"
2	Tadej Pogačar (SLO)	UAE Team Emirates	+ 10"
3	Carlos Rodriguez (ESP)	Ineos Grenadiers	+ 5' 21"
4	Adam Yates (GBR)	UAE Team Emirates	+ 5' 40"
5	Jai Hindley (AUS)	Bora–Hansgrohe	+ 6' 38"
6	Sepp Kuss (USA)	Team Jumbo–Visma	+ 9' 16"
7	Pello Bilbao (ESP)	Team Bahrain Victorious	+ 10' 11"
8	Simon Yates (GBR)	Team Jayco–AlUla	+ 10' 48"
9	David Gaudu (FRA)	Groupama–FDJ	+ 14' 07"
10	Guillaume Martin (FRA)	Cofidis	+ 14' 18"

== Rest day 2 ==
17 July 2023 – Saint-Gervais-les-Bains

== Stage 16 ==
18 July 2023 – Passy to Combloux, 22.4 km (13.9 mi), (ITT)

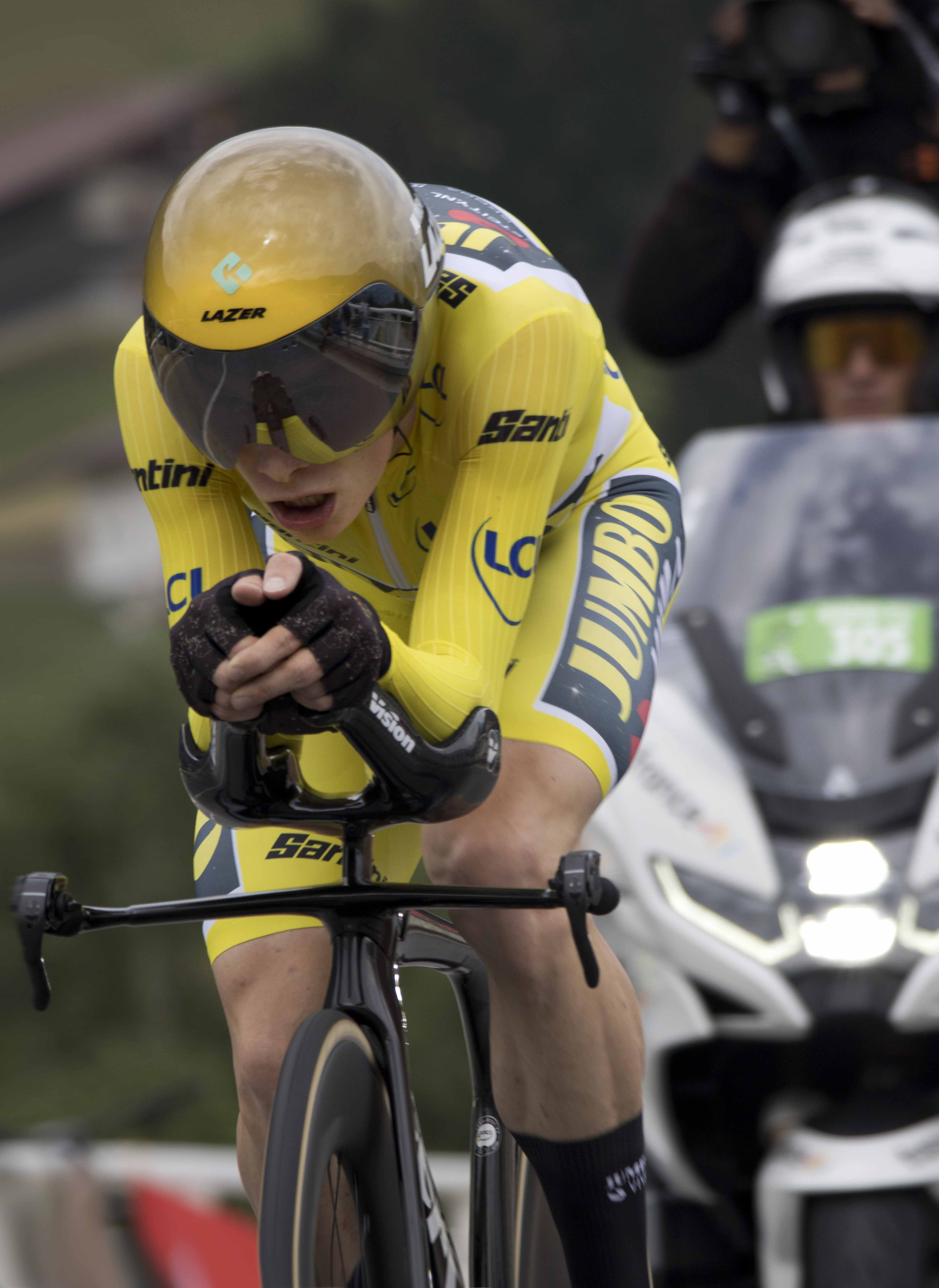
Jonas Vingegaard in the yellow jersey during the time trial on stage 16

After the second rest day, stage 16 was the only individual time trial of the Tour, 22.4 km between Passy and Combloux.

Pogačar aimed to reverse the 10 second lead of Vingegaard, but the latter won stage 16 decisively and widened his lead to 1 minute and 48 seconds. Pogačar came in second, over a minute ahead of Vingegaard's teammate van Aert, while Adam Yates moved into third place in the general classification, ahead of Rodriguez.

Stage 16 Result
Rank	Rider	Team	Time
1	Jonas Vingegaard (DEN)	Team Jumbo–Visma	32' 36"
2	Tadej Pogačar (SLO)	UAE Team Emirates	+ 1' 38"
3	Wout van Aert (BEL)	Team Jumbo–Visma	+ 2' 51"
4	Pello Bilbao (ESP)	Team Bahrain Victorious	+ 2' 55"
5	Simon Yates (GBR)	Team Jayco–AlUla	+ 2' 58"
6	Rémi Cavagna (FRA)	Soudal–Quick-Step	+ 3' 06"
7	Adam Yates (GBR)	UAE Team Emirates	+ 3' 12"
8	Mattias Skjelmose (DEN)	Lidl–Trek	+ 3' 21"
9	Mads Pedersen (DEN)	Lidl–Trek	+ 3' 31"
10	David Gaudu (FRA)	Groupama–FDJ	+ 3' 31"

General classification after Stage 16
Rank	Rider	Team	Time
1	Jonas Vingegaard (DEN)	Team Jumbo–Visma	63h 06' 53"
2	Tadej Pogačar (SLO)	UAE Team Emirates	+ 1' 48"
3	Adam Yates (GBR)	UAE Team Emirates	+ 8' 52"
4	Carlos Rodriguez (ESP)	Ineos Grenadiers	+ 8' 57"
5	Jai Hindley (AUS)	Bora–Hansgrohe	+ 11' 15"
6	Sepp Kuss (USA)	Team Jumbo–Visma	+ 12' 56"
7	Pello Bilbao (ESP)	Team Bahrain Victorious	+ 13' 06"
8	Simon Yates (GBR)	Team Jayco–AlUla	+ 13' 46"
9	David Gaudu (FRA)	Groupama–FDJ	+ 17' 38"
10	Felix Gall (AUT)	AG2R Citroën Team	+ 18' 19"

== Stage 17 ==
19 July 2023 – Saint-Gervais-les-Bains to Courchevel, 166 km (103 mi)

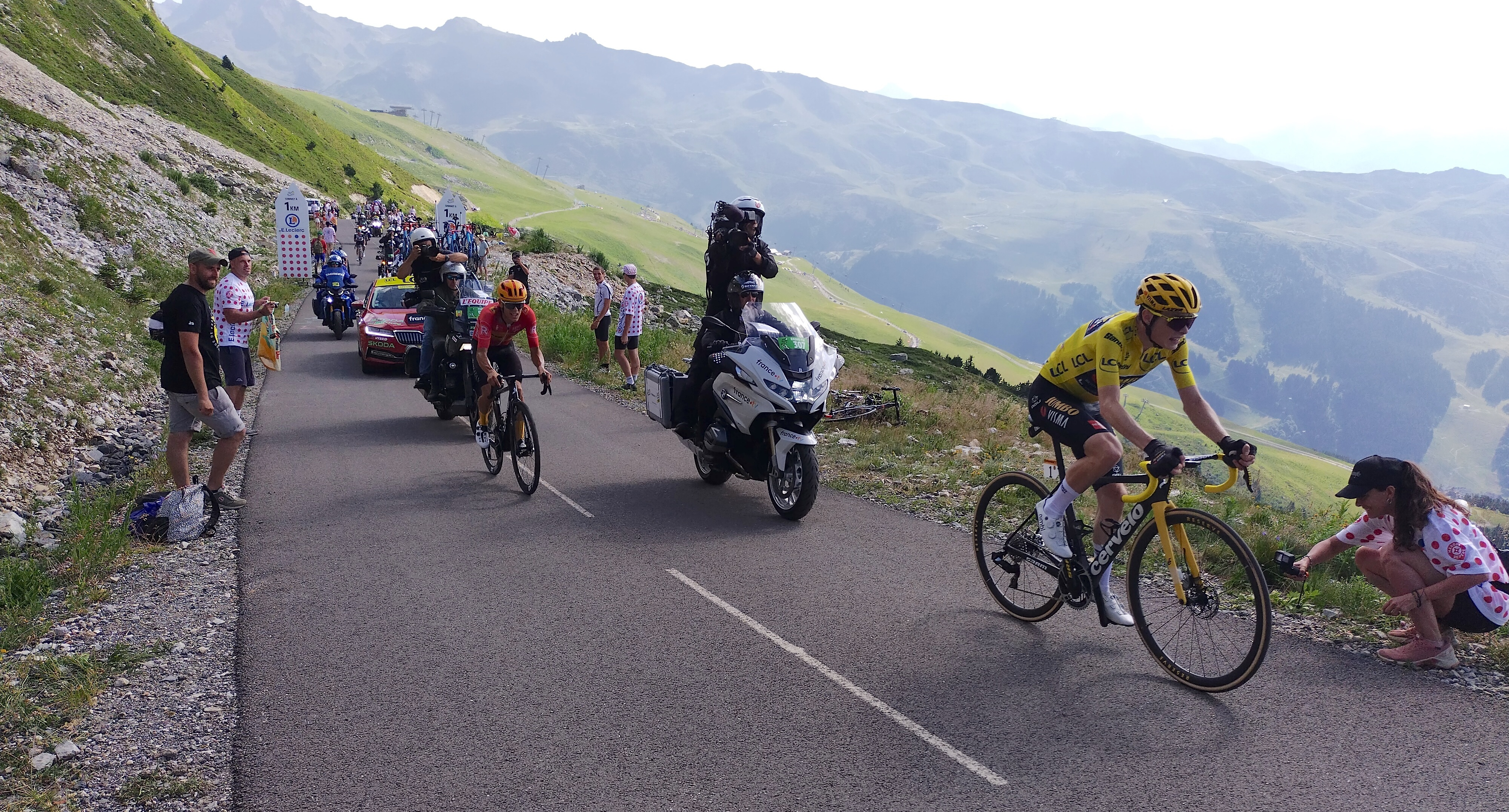
Jonas Vingegaard on Col de la Loze

On stage 17, a fierce counter-attack from Pogačar was expected. However, Pogačar needed assistance from his teammate Marc Soler in the climb towards the Col de la Loze and lost further time to Vingegaard, who widened the lead to more than seven minutes in a stage won by Felix Gall (AG2R Citroën Team).

Stage 17 Result
Rank	Rider	Team	Time
1	Felix Gall (AUT)	AG2R Citroën Team	4h 49' 08"
2	Simon Yates (GBR)	Team Jayco–AlUla	+ 34"
3	Pello Bilbao (ESP)	Team Bahrain Victorious	+ 1' 38"
4	Jonas Vingegaard (DEN)	Team Jumbo–Visma	+ 1' 52"
5	David Gaudu (FRA)	Groupama–FDJ	+ 2' 09"
6	Tobias Halland Johannessen (NOR)	Uno-X Pro Cycling Team	+ 2' 39"
7	Chris Harper (AUS)	Team Jayco–AlUla	+ 2' 50"
8	Rafał Majka (POL)	UAE Team Emirates	+ 3' 43"
9	Adam Yates (GBR)	UAE Team Emirates	+ 3' 43"
10	Wilco Kelderman (NED)	Team Jumbo–Visma	+ 3' 49"

General classification after Stage 17
Rank	Rider	Team	Time
1	Jonas Vingegaard (DEN)	Team Jumbo–Visma	67h 57' 51"
2	Tadej Pogačar (SLO)	UAE Team Emirates	+ 7' 35"
3	Adam Yates (GBR)	UAE Team Emirates	+ 10' 45"
4	Carlos Rodriguez (ESP)	Ineos Grenadiers	+ 12' 01"
5	Simon Yates (GBR)	Team Jayco–AlUla	+ 12' 19"
6	Pello Bilbao (ESP)	Team Bahrain Victorious	+ 12' 50"
7	Jai Hindley (AUS)	Bora–Hansgrohe	+ 13' 50"
8	Felix Gall (AUT)	AG2R Citroën Team	+ 16' 11"
9	Sepp Kuss (USA)	Team Jumbo–Visma	+ 16' 49"
10	David Gaudu (FRA)	Groupama–FDJ	+ 17' 57"

== Stage 18 ==
20 July 2023 – Moûtiers to Bourg-en-Bresse, 185 km (115 mi)

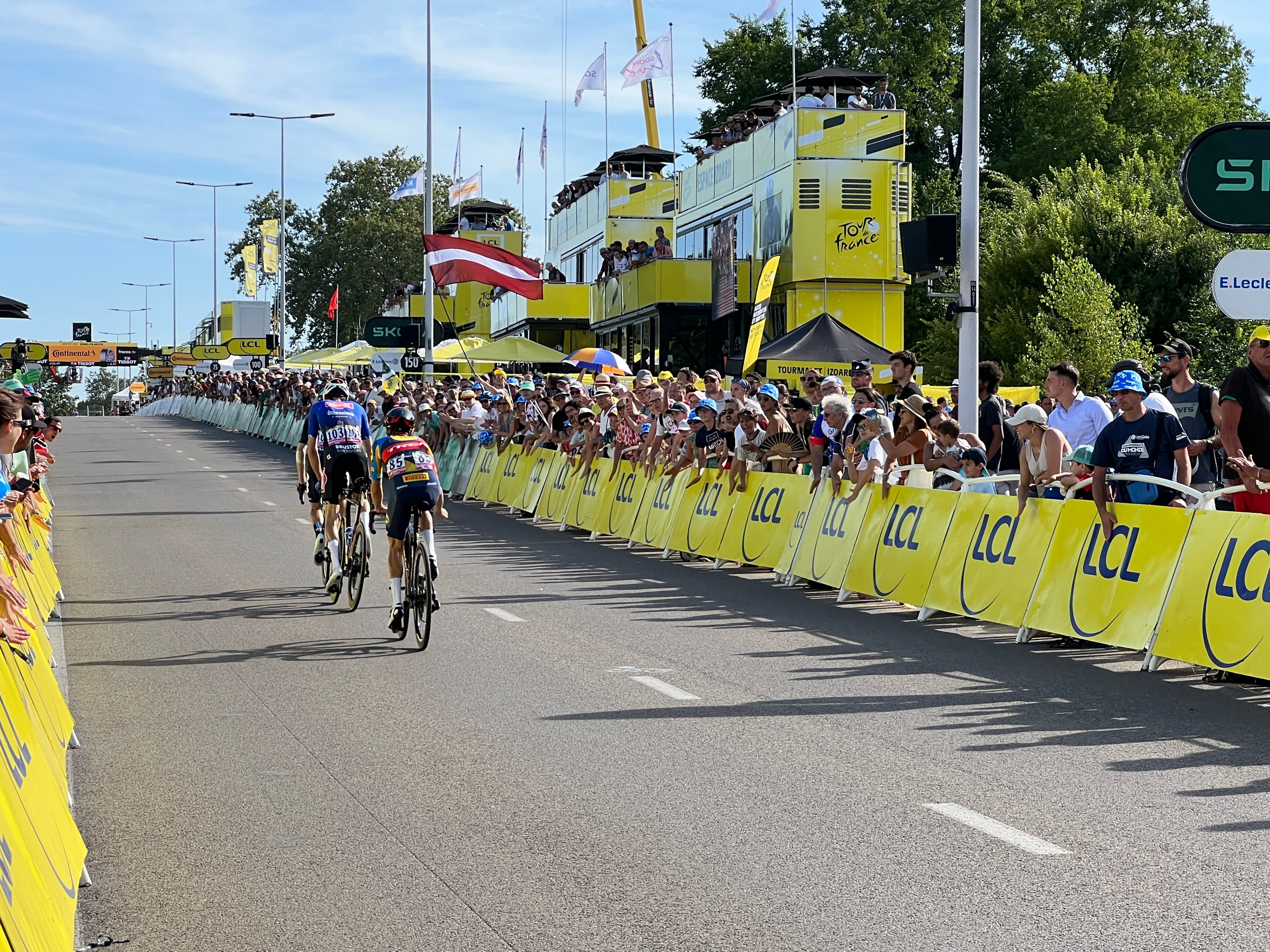
Riders approaching the sprint finish in Bourg-en-Bresse

Kasper Asgreen (Soudal Quick-Step) held off the competition to win the eighteenth stage, which entered the Rhone valley. Meanwhile, Wout van Aert left the race to be with his wife, who was about to give birth.

Stage 18 Result
Rank	Rider	Team	Time
1	Kasper Asgreen (DEN)	Soudal–Quick-Step	4h 06' 48"
2	Pascal Eenkhoorn (NED)	Lotto–Dstny	+ 0"
3	Jonas Abrahamsen (NOR)	Uno-X Pro Cycling Team	+ 0"
4	Jasper Philipsen (BEL)	Alpecin–Deceuninck	+ 0"
5	Mads Pedersen (DEN)	Lidl–Trek	+ 0"
6	Cees Bol (NED)	Astana Qazaqstan Team	+ 0"
7	Jordi Meeus (BEL)	Bora–Hansgrohe	+ 0"
8	Matteo Trentin (ITA)	UAE Team Emirates	+ 0"
9	Christophe Laporte (FRA)	Team Jumbo–Visma	+ 0"
10	Luca Mozzato (ITA)	Arkéa–Samsic	+ 0"

General classification after Stage 18
Rank	Rider	Team	Time
1	Jonas Vingegaard (DEN)	Team Jumbo–Visma	72h 04' 39"
2	Tadej Pogačar (SLO)	UAE Team Emirates	+ 7' 35"
3	Adam Yates (GBR)	UAE Team Emirates	+ 10' 45"
4	Carlos Rodriguez (ESP)	Ineos Grenadiers	+ 12' 01"
5	Simon Yates (GBR)	Team Jayco–AlUla	+ 12' 19"
6	Pello Bilbao (ESP)	Team Bahrain Victorious	+ 12' 50"
7	Jai Hindley (AUS)	Bora–Hansgrohe	+ 13' 50"
8	Felix Gall (AUT)	AG2R Citroën Team	+ 16' 11"
9	Sepp Kuss (USA)	Team Jumbo–Visma	+ 16' 49"
10	David Gaudu (FRA)	Groupama–FDJ	+ 17' 57"

== Stage 19 ==
21 July 2023 – Moirans-en-Montagne to Poligny, 173 km (107 mi)

On stage 19, Matej Mohorič (Team Bahrain Victorious) won by the width of a rim to beat Asgreen in a photo finish in Poligny. After winning the stage, Mohorič paid tribute to his late teammate Gino Mäder, who died in a crash at in the Tour de Suisse in June.

Stage 19 Result
Rank	Rider	Team	Time
1	Matej Mohorič (SLO)	Team Bahrain Victorious	3h 31' 02"
2	Kasper Asgreen (DEN)	Soudal–Quick-Step	+ 0"
3	Ben O'Connor (AUS)	AG2R Citroën Team	+ 4"
4	Jasper Philipsen (BEL)	Alpecin–Deceuninck	+ 39"
5	Mads Pedersen (DEN)	Lidl–Trek	+ 39"
6	Christophe Laporte (FRA)	Team Jumbo–Visma	+ 39"
7	Luka Mezgec (SLO)	Team Jayco–AlUla	+ 39"
8	Alberto Bettiol (ITA)	EF Education–EasyPost	+ 39"
9	Matteo Trentin (ITA)	UAE Team Emirates	+ 39"
10	Tom Pidcock (GBR)	Ineos Grenadiers	+ 39"

General classification after Stage 19
Rank	Rider	Team	Time
1	Jonas Vingegaard (DEN)	Team Jumbo–Visma	75h 49' 24"
2	Tadej Pogačar (SLO)	UAE Team Emirates	+ 7' 35"
3	Adam Yates (GBR)	UAE Team Emirates	+ 10' 45"
4	Carlos Rodriguez (ESP)	Ineos Grenadiers	+ 12' 01"
5	Simon Yates (GBR)	Team Jayco–AlUla	+ 12' 19"
6	Pello Bilbao (ESP)	Team Bahrain Victorious	+ 12' 50"
7	Jai Hindley (AUS)	Bora–Hansgrohe	+ 13' 50"
8	Felix Gall (AUT)	AG2R Citroën Team	+ 16' 11"
9	Sepp Kuss (USA)	Team Jumbo–Visma	+ 16' 49"
10	David Gaudu (FRA)	Groupama–FDJ	+ 17' 57"

== Stage 20 ==
22 July 2023 – Belfort to Le Markstein, 133.5 km (83.0 mi)

In the twentieth stage, Thibaut Pinot, in his last Tour before retirement, attacked the breakaway and was solo leader at the top of the Petit Ballon, which was lined by thousands of fans cheering him on. He was overtaken and dropped by the race leaders on the ascent to the Col du Platzerwasel, and Pogačar won the stage ahead of Gall and his tour rival Vingegaard. In the same stage, the Italian Giulio Ciccone (Lidl–Trek) sealed the victory for the mountain classification. He was the first Italian to achieve this feat since Claudio Chiappucci in 1992.

Stage 20 Result
Rank	Rider	Team	Time
1	Tadej Pogačar (SLO)	UAE Team Emirates	3h 27' 18"
2	Felix Gall (AUT)	AG2R Citroën Team	+ 0"
3	Jonas Vingegaard (DEN)	Team Jumbo–Visma	+ 0"
4	Simon Yates (GBR)	Team Jayco–AlUla	+ 0"
5	Adam Yates (GBR)	UAE Team Emirates	+ 7"
6	Warren Barguil (FRA)	Arkéa–Samsic	+ 33"
7	Thibaut Pinot (FRA)	Groupama–FDJ	+ 33"
8	Pello Bilbao (ESP)	Team Bahrain Victorious	+ 33"
9	Tobias Halland Johannessen (NOR)	Uno-X Pro Cycling Team	+ 50"
10	Rafał Majka (POL)	UAE Team Emirates	+ 50"

General classification after Stage 20
Rank	Rider	Team	Time
1	Jonas Vingegaard (DEN)	Team Jumbo–Visma	79h 16' 38"
2	Tadej Pogačar (SLO)	UAE Team Emirates	+ 7' 29"
3	Adam Yates (GBR)	UAE Team Emirates	+ 10' 56"
4	Simon Yates (GBR)	Team Jayco–AlUla	+ 12' 23"
5	Carlos Rodriguez (ESP)	Ineos Grenadiers	+ 13' 17"
6	Pello Bilbao (ESP)	Team Bahrain Victorious	+ 13' 27"
7	Jai Hindley (AUS)	Bora–Hansgrohe	+ 14' 44"
8	Felix Gall (AUT)	AG2R Citroën Team	+ 16' 09"
9	David Gaudu (FRA)	Groupama–FDJ	+ 23' 08"
10	Guillaume Martin (FRA)	Cofidis	+ 26' 30"

== Stage 21 ==
23 July 2023 – Saint-Quentin-en-Yvelines to Paris (Champs-Élysées), 115 km (71 mi)

The final stage was traditionally calm and the Belgian Jordi Meeus won just ahead of his compatriot Philipsen, Groenewegen, and Pedersen.

Philipsen won the green jersey of the points classification for the first time in his career. Vingegaard crossed the finish line at the Champs-Élysées arm in arm with his teammates, finishing 7:29 minutes ahead of Pogačar and 10:56 minutes ahead of Adam Yates to win the Tour de France for the second straight year. His winning margin of 7 minutes 29 seconds was the largest since 2014. Vingegaard's Team Jumbo–Visma won the teams classification. Victor Campenaerts was chosen as the most combative rider. Runner up Pogačar won the white jersey of the young rider classification for the fourth year in a row.

Stage 21 Result
Rank	Rider	Team	Time
1	Jordi Meeus (BEL)	Bora–Hansgrohe	2h 56' 13"
2	Jasper Philipsen (BEL)	Alpecin–Deceuninck	+ 0"
3	Dylan Groenewegen (NLD)	Team Jayco–AlUla	+ 0"
4	Mads Pedersen (DEN)	Trek–Segafredo	+ 0"
5	Cees Bol (NLD)	Astana Qazaqstan Team	+ 0"
6	Biniam Girmay (ERI)	Intermarché–Circus–Wanty	+ 0"
7	Bryan Coquard (FRA)	Cofidis	+ 0"
8	Søren Wærenskjold (NOR)	Uno-X Pro Cycling Team	+ 0"
9	Corbin Strong (NZL)	Israel–Premier Tech	+ 0"
10	Luca Mozzato (ITA)	Arkéa–Samsic	+ 0"

General classification after Stage 21
Rank	Rider	Team	Time
1	Jonas Vingegaard (DEN)	Team Jumbo–Visma	79h 16' 38"
2	Tadej Pogačar (SLO)	UAE Team Emirates	+ 7' 29"
3	Adam Yates (GBR)	UAE Team Emirates	+ 10' 56"
4	Simon Yates (GBR)	Team Jayco–AlUla	+ 12' 23"
5	Carlos Rodriguez (ESP)	Ineos Grenadiers	+ 13' 17"
6	Pello Bilbao (ESP)	Team Bahrain Victorious	+ 13' 27"
7	Jai Hindley (AUS)	Bora–Hansgrohe	+ 14' 44"
8	Felix Gall (AUT)	AG2R Citroën Team	+ 16' 09"
9	David Gaudu (FRA)	Groupama–FDJ	+ 23' 08"
10	Guillaume Martin (FRA)	Cofidis	+ 26' 30"
