= 2023 Tour de France, Stage 1 to Stage 11 =

Cycling results

The 2023 Tour de France is the 110th edition of the Tour de France. It started in Bilbao, Spain, on 1 July and ended with the final stage at Champs-Élysées, Paris on 23 July.

== Classification standings ==
Legend
Denotes the leader of the general classification	Denotes the leader of the mountains classification
Denotes the leader of the points classification	Denotes the leader of the young rider classification
Denotes the leader of the team classification	Denotes the winner of the combativity award

== Stage 1 ==
1 July 2023 – Bilbao (Spain), 182 km (113 mi)

The first stage around Bilbao in the Basque Country saw a crash of several riders, which ultimately forced two pre-race favourites, Richard Carapaz (EF Education–EasyPost) and Enric Mas (Movistar Team), to abandon. It was later determined Carapaz had fractured his patella. The race broke into several groups over the two final climbs of the day, with identical twins Adam Yates (UAE Team Emirates) and Simon Yates (Team Jayco–AlUla) breaking away from a select group on the final ascent. The pair held their advantage to the finish, with Adam Yates taking the stage win and the first leader's yellow jersey ahead of his brother. Two-time winner Tadej Pogačar (UAE Team Emirates) won the sprint in the group behind to finish third, and Neilson Powless (EF Education–EasyPost) took the lead in the mountains classification.

Stage 1 Result
Rank	Rider	Team	Time
1	Adam Yates (GBR)	UAE Team Emirates	4h 22' 49"
2	Simon Yates (GBR)	Team Jayco–AlUla	+ 4"
3	Tadej Pogačar (SLO)	UAE Team Emirates	+ 12"
4	Thibaut Pinot (FRA)	Groupama–FDJ	+ 12"
5	Michael Woods (CAN)	Israel–Premier Tech	+ 12"
6	Victor Lafay (FRA)	Cofidis	+ 12"
7	Jai Hindley (AUS)	Bora–Hansgrohe	+ 12"
8	Mattias Skjelmose (DEN)	Lidl–Trek	+ 12"
9	Jonas Vingegaard (DEN)	Team Jumbo–Visma	+ 12"
10	David Gaudu (FRA)	Groupama–FDJ	+ 12"

General classification after Stage 1
Rank	Rider	Team	Time
1	Adam Yates (GBR)	UAE Team Emirates	4h 22' 39"
2	Simon Yates (GBR)	Team Jayco–AlUla	+ 8"
3	Tadej Pogačar (SLO)	UAE Team Emirates	+ 18"
4	Thibaut Pinot (FRA)	Groupama–FDJ	+ 22"
5	Michael Woods (CAN)	Israel–Premier Tech	+ 22"
6	Victor Lafay (FRA)	Cofidis	+ 22"
7	Jai Hindley (AUS)	Bora–Hansgrohe	+ 22"
8	Mattias Skjelmose (DEN)	Lidl–Trek	+ 22"
9	Jonas Vingegaard (DEN)	Team Jumbo–Visma	+ 22"
10	David Gaudu (FRA)	Groupama–FDJ	+ 22"

== Stage 2 ==
2 July 2023 – Vitoria-Gasteiz to San Sebastián (Spain), 209 km (130 mi)

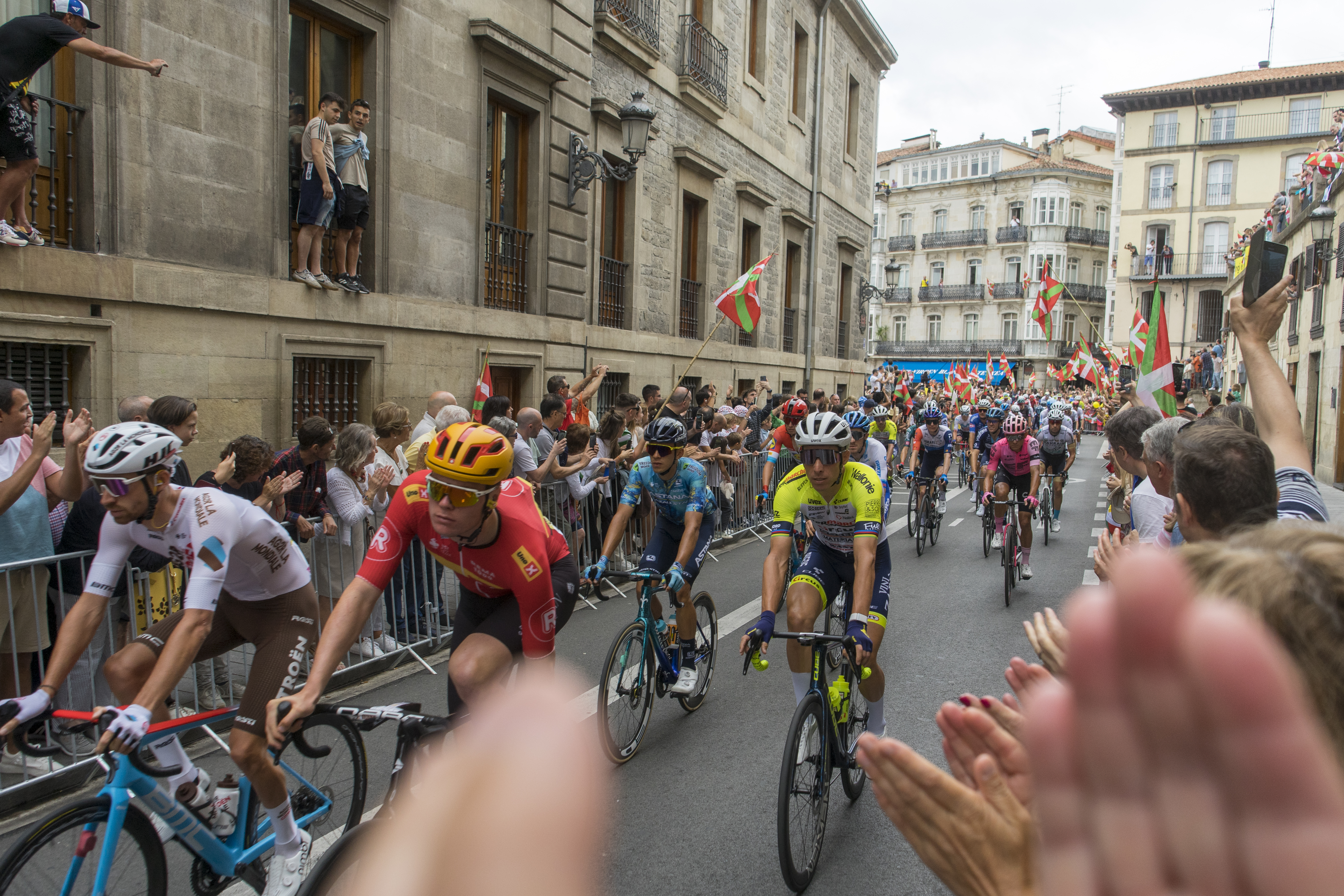
The peloton passing through Vitoria-Gasteiz during stage 2

Stage 2 featured the climb of the Jaizkibel, prominently used in the race Clásica de San Sebastián later in the season. On the climb, a select group of favourites emerged ahead of the peloton, with Pogačar taking eight bonus seconds available at the summit ahead of defending champion Jonas Vingegaard (Team Jumbo–Visma). Victor Lafay (Cofidis) broke clear of the leading group within the final kilometre of the stage and managed to keep his advantage to win the stage ahead of defending green jersey winner Wout van Aert (Team Jumbo–Visma), while Yates retained the yellow jersey.

Stage 2 Result
Rank	Rider	Team	Time
1	Victor Lafay (FRA)	Cofidis	4h 46' 39"
2	Wout van Aert (BEL)	Team Jumbo–Visma	+ 0"
3	Tadej Pogačar (SLO)	UAE Team Emirates	+ 0"
4	Tom Pidcock (GBR)	INEOS Grenadiers	+ 0"
5	Pello Bilbao (ESP)	Team Bahrain Victorious	+ 0"
6	Michael Woods (CAN)	Israel–Premier Tech	+ 0"
7	Romain Bardet (FRA)	Team dsm–firmenich	+ 0"
8	Dylan Teuns (BEL)	Israel–Premier Tech	+ 0"
9	Jai Hindley (AUS)	Bora–Hansgrohe	+ 0"
10	Steff Cras (BEL)	Team TotalEnergies	+ 0"

General classification after Stage 2
Rank	Rider	Team	Time
1	Adam Yates (GBR)	UAE Team Emirates	9h 09' 18"
2	Tadej Pogačar (SLO)	UAE Team Emirates	+ 6"
3	Simon Yates (GBR)	Team Jayco–AlUla	+ 6"
4	Victor Lafay (FRA)	Cofidis	+ 12"
5	Wout van Aert (BEL)	Team Jumbo–Visma	+ 16"
6	Jonas Vingegaard (DEN)	Team Jumbo–Visma	+ 17"
7	Michael Woods (CAN)	Israel–Premier Tech	+ 22"
8	Jai Hindley (AUS)	Bora–Hansgrohe	+ 22"
9	Mikel Landa (ESP)	Team Bahrain Victorious	+ 22"
10	Carlos Rodriguez (ESP)	INEOS Grenadiers	+ 22"

== Stage 3 ==
3 July 2023 – Amorebieta-Etxano (Spain) to Bayonne, 193.5 km (120.2 mi)

On stage 3 into Bayonne, Jasper Philipsen (Alpecin–Deceuninck) came in ahead of Phil Bauhaus (Team Bahrain Victorious), following a strong lead-out by teammate Mathieu van der Poel. Yates remained in the leader's jersey while Powless collected more points for the mountains classification as part of the breakaway.

Stage 3 Result
Rank	Rider	Team	Time
1	Jasper Philipsen (BEL)	Alpecin–Deceuninck	4h 43' 15"
2	Phil Bauhaus (GER)	Team Bahrain Victorious	+ 0"
3	Caleb Ewan (AUS)	Lotto–Dstny	+ 0"
4	Fabio Jakobsen (NED)	Soudal–Quick-Step	+ 0"
5	Wout van Aert (BEL)	Team Jumbo–Visma	+ 0"
6	Mark Cavendish (GBR)	Astana Qazaqstan Team	+ 0"
7	Jordi Meeus (BEL)	Bora–Hansgrohe	+ 0"
8	Dylan Groenewegen (NED)	Team Jayco–AlUla	+ 0"
9	Mads Pedersen (DEN)	Lidl–Trek	+ 0"
10	Bryan Coquard (FRA)	Cofidis	+ 0"

General classification after Stage 3
Rank	Rider	Team	Time
1	Adam Yates (GBR)	UAE Team Emirates	13h 52' 33"
2	Tadej Pogačar (SLO)	UAE Team Emirates	+ 6"
3	Simon Yates (GBR)	Team Jayco–AlUla	+ 6"
4	Victor Lafay (FRA)	Cofidis	+ 12"
5	Wout van Aert (BEL)	Team Jumbo–Visma	+ 16"
6	Jonas Vingegaard (DEN)	Team Jumbo–Visma	+ 17"
7	Michael Woods (CAN)	Israel–Premier Tech	+ 22"
8	Jai Hindley (AUS)	Bora–Hansgrohe	+ 22"
9	Carlos Rodriguez (ESP)	INEOS Grenadiers	+ 22"
10	Mattias Skjelmose (DEN)	Lidl–Trek	+ 22"

== Stage 4 ==
4 July 2023 – Dax to Nogaro, 182 km (113 mi)

On stage 4, Philipsen won ahead of Caleb Ewan (Lotto–Dstny) and Bauhaus in a sprint finish at the Circuit Paul Armagnac in Nogaro. The final part of the stage was marred by several crashes, including Fabio Jakobsen (Soudal–Quick-Step), while Yates retained the yellow jersey for another day. Following two hard opening days and with the high mountains of the Pyrenees to come the day after, the field took a slow tempo during stage 4, with no breakaway forming until 100 km (62 mi) into the race. This led to criticism, with some, such as stage winner Philipsen, describing it as "the most boring Tour de France stage for a long time".

Stage 4 Result
Rank	Rider	Team	Time
1	Jasper Philipsen (BEL)	Alpecin–Deceuninck	4h 25' 28"
2	Caleb Ewan (AUS)	Lotto–Dstny	+ 0"
3	Phil Bauhaus (GER)	Team Bahrain Victorious	+ 0"
4	Bryan Coquard (FRA)	Cofidis	+ 0"
5	Mark Cavendish (GBR)	Astana Qazaqstan Team	+ 0"
6	Danny van Poppel (NED)	Bora–Hansgrohe	+ 0"
7	Alexander Kristoff (NOR)	Uno-X Pro Cycling Team	+ 0"
8	Luka Mezgec (SLO)	Team Jayco–AlUla	+ 0"
9	Wout van Aert (BEL)	Team Jumbo–Visma	+ 0"
10	Mads Pedersen (DEN)	Lidl–Trek	+ 0"

General classification after Stage 4
Rank	Rider	Team	Time
1	Adam Yates (GBR)	UAE Team Emirates	18h 18' 01"
2	Tadej Pogačar (SLO)	UAE Team Emirates	+ 6"
3	Simon Yates (GBR)	Team Jayco–AlUla	+ 6"
4	Victor Lafay (FRA)	Cofidis	+ 12"
5	Wout van Aert (BEL)	Team Jumbo–Visma	+ 16"
6	Jonas Vingegaard (DEN)	Team Jumbo–Visma	+ 17"
7	Jai Hindley (AUS)	Bora–Hansgrohe	+ 22"
8	Michael Woods (CAN)	Israel–Premier Tech	+ 22"
9	Mattias Skjelmose (DEN)	Lidl–Trek	+ 22"
10	Carlos Rodriguez (ESP)	INEOS Grenadiers	+ 22"

== Stage 5 ==
5 July 2023 – Pau to Laruns, 163 km (101 mi)

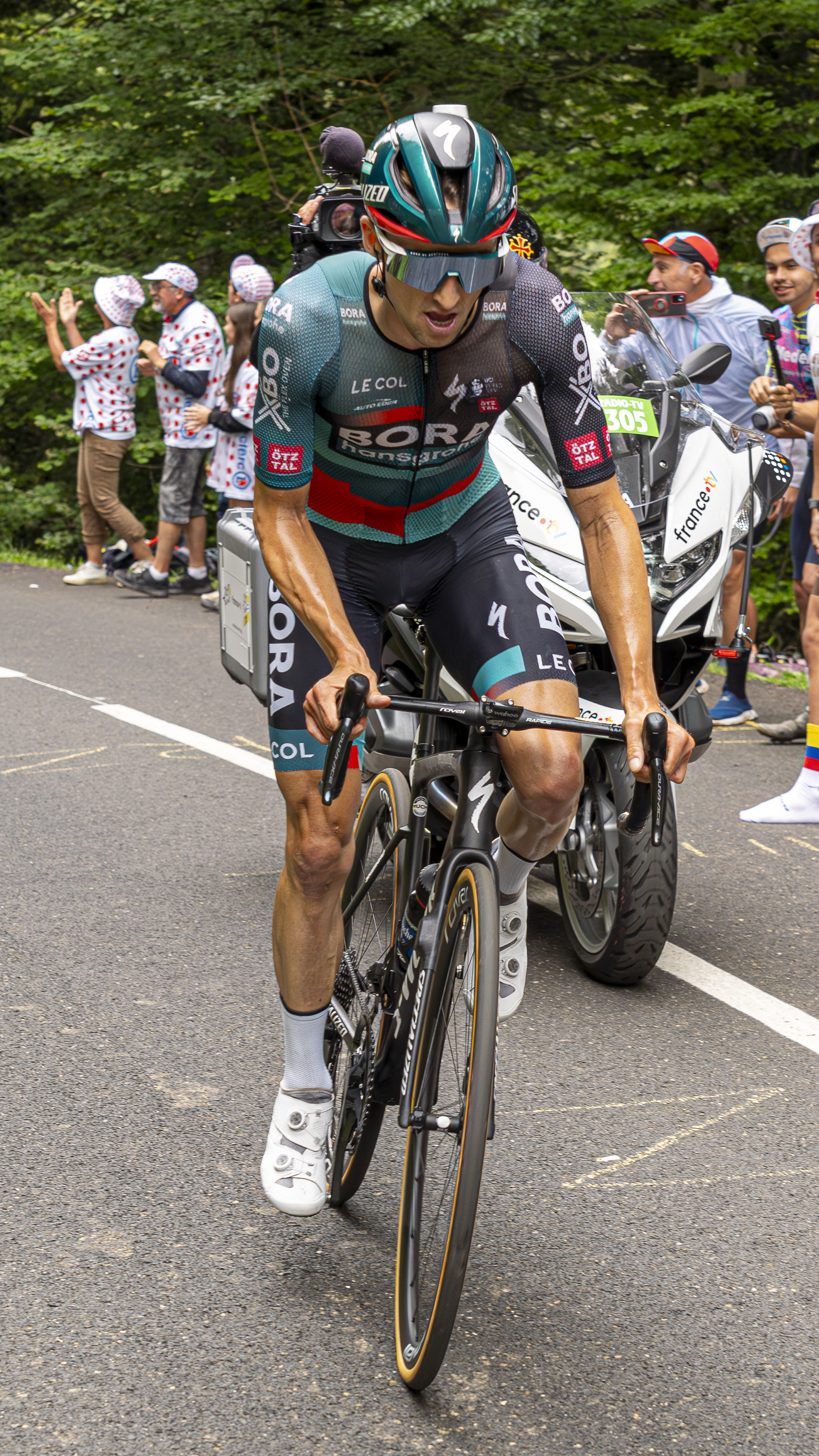
Jai Hindley on the Col de Marie-Blanque during stage 5

On Stage 5, the first mountain stage in the Pyrenees, a substantial breakaway group of 17 riders emerged, including several pre-race favorites. This breakaway, which included Jai Hindley (Bora–Hansgrohe), his teammate Emanuel Buchmann, Giulio Ciccone, Wout van Aert, former world champion Julian Alaphilippe (Soudal–Quick-Step), and Austrian climber Felix Gall (AG2R Citroën Team), gained an advantage over the main peloton and maintained a consistent lead. The breakaway's maximum lead over the peloton was four minutes, and it remained at around 2:30 minutes as the riders approached the final climb of the day, the Col de Marie-Blanque.

During the ascent of the Col de Marie-Blanque, Gall and Hindley, who had accumulated enough points to secure the mountains classification lead, broke away from the breakaway group. Hindley managed to drop Gall and proceeded to ride solo over the top of the climb and to the finish line in Laruns, securing the stage victory and taking the lead in the general classification.

In the pursuing group of favorites, Vingegaard launched an attack 1.5 km (0.93 mi) from the summit of the Marie-Blanque. This move allowed him to distance Pogačar. As Vingegaard caught up to Gall, Buchmann, and Ciccone on the descent, he secured a fifth-place finish on the stage, crossing the finish line 34 seconds behind Hindley. Pogačar tried to limit his losses, waiting for his distanced teammate Adam Yates, and eventually crossed the finish line 1:04 minutes behind Vingegaard, causing him to drop to sixth place overall. Other contenders like Gaudu, Martinez, Rodriguez, and the Yates brothers also finished together with Pogačar. Meanwhile, Ben O'Connor and Romain Bardet lost 1:57 minutes to Hindley.

Stage 5 Result
Rank	Rider	Team	Time
1	Jai Hindley (AUS)	Bora–Hansgrohe	3h 57' 07"
2	Giulio Ciccone (ITA)	Lidl–Trek	+ 32"
3	Felix Gall (AUT)	AG2R Citroën Team	+ 32"
4	Emanuel Buchmann (GER)	Bora–Hansgrohe	+ 32"
5	Jonas Vingegaard (DEN)	Team Jumbo–Visma	+ 34"
6	Mattias Skjelmose (DEN)	Lidl–Trek	+ 1' 38"
7	Daniel Martínez (COL)	INEOS Grenadiers	+ 1' 38"
8	Tadej Pogačar (SLO)	UAE Team Emirates	+ 1' 38"
9	David Gaudu (FRA)	Groupama–FDJ	+ 1' 38"
10	Carlos Rodriguez (ESP)	INEOS Grenadiers	+ 1' 38"

General classification after Stage 5
Rank	Rider	Team	Time
1	Jai Hindley (AUS)	Bora–Hansgrohe	22h 15' 12"
2	Jonas Vingegaard (DEN)	Team Jumbo–Visma	+ 47"
3	Giulio Ciccone (ITA)	Lidl–Trek	+ 1' 03"
4	Emanuel Buchmann (GER)	Bora–Hansgrohe	+ 1' 11"
5	Adam Yates (GBR)	UAE Team Emirates	+ 1' 34"
6	Tadej Pogačar (SLO)	UAE Team Emirates	+ 1' 40"
7	Simon Yates (GBR)	Team Jayco–AlUla	+ 1' 40"
8	Mattias Skjelmose (DEN)	Lidl–Trek	+ 1' 56"
9	Carlos Rodriguez (ESP)	INEOS Grenadiers	+ 1' 56"
10	David Gaudu (FRA)	Groupama–FDJ	+ 1' 56"

== Stage 6 ==
6 July 2023 – Tarbes to Cauterets (Cambasque), 145 km (90 mi)

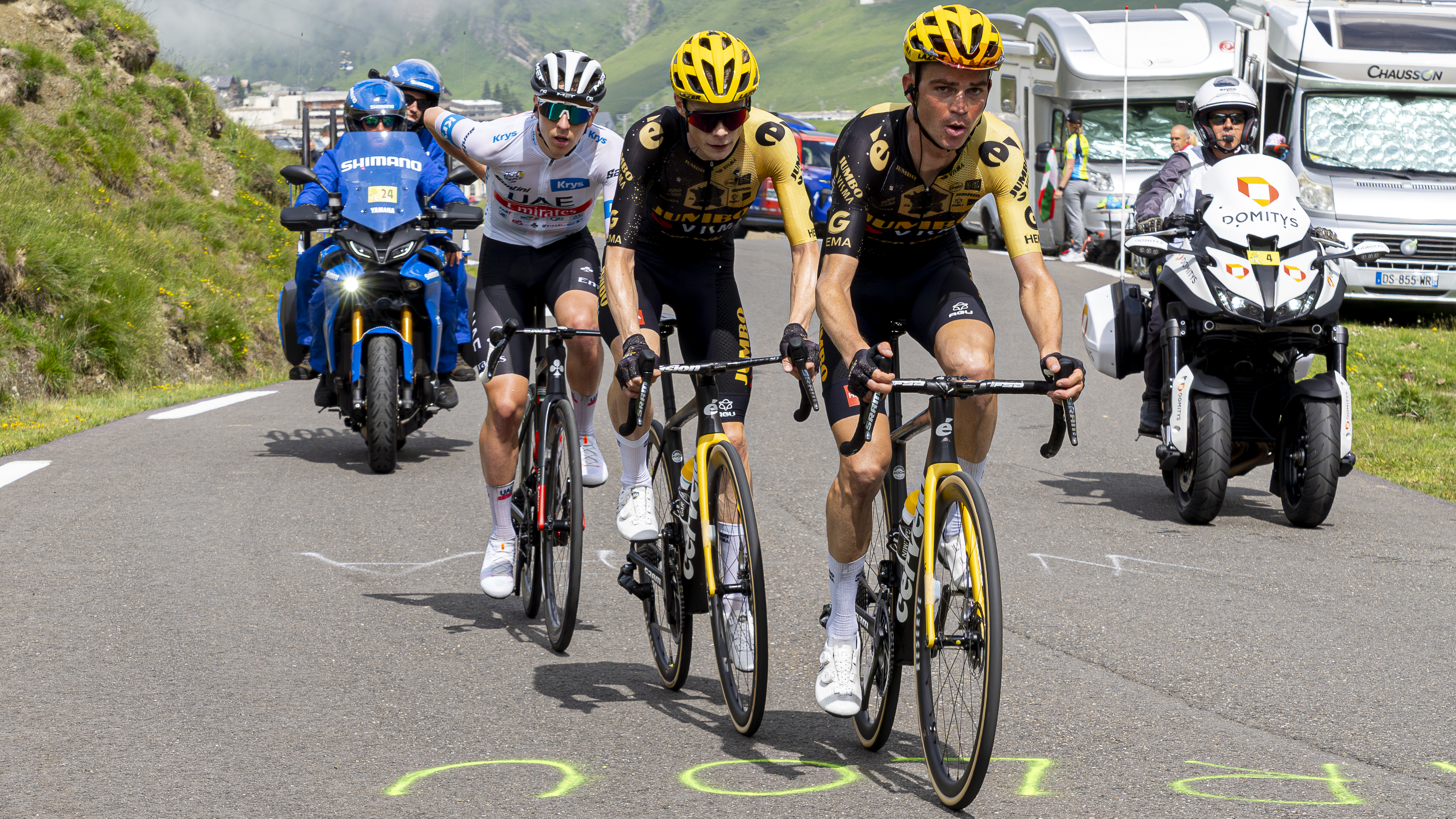
Sepp Kuss (right) leading favourites Jonas Vingegaard and Tadej Pogačar on the Col du Tourmalet during stage 6

The first mountain finish of the Tour occurred on Stage 6 in Cauterets-Cambasque. A breakaway of twenty riders formed, which included van Aert and Powless. This breakaway enabled Powless to regain the lead in the mountains classification. During the ascent of the Col du Tourmalet, Team Jumbo–Visma picked up the pace in the peloton, led by Sepp Kuss to support Vingegaard. As a result, all riders were distanced except for Pogačar. Vingegaard caught up with van Aert, who had dropped back from the lead group to assist his team leader.

Approximately halfway up the 16 km (9.9 mi) final ascent to Cambasque, a lead-out by Van Aert set the stage for Vingegaard and Pogačar to pull ahead of all other riders. Around 2.5 km (1.6 mi) from the finish, Pogačar launched an acceleration that allowed him to distance Vingegaard. Pogačar secured the stage victory, while Vingegaard finished second, 24 seconds behind. Vingegaard's performance granted him the coveted yellow jersey of the race leader, holding a 25-second advantage over Pogačar in the general classification. The previous overnight leader, Hindley, who had fallen behind on the Tourmalet climb, experienced a significant time loss and dropped to third place overall, trailing Vingegaard by 1:34 minutes.

Stage 6 Result
Rank	Rider	Team	Time
1	Tadej Pogačar (SLO)	UAE Team Emirates	3h 54' 27"
2	Jonas Vingegaard (DEN)	Team Jumbo–Visma	+ 24"
3	Tobias Halland Johannessen (NOR)	Uno-X Pro Cycling Team	+ 1' 22"
4	Ruben Guerreiro (POR)	Movistar Team	+ 2' 06"
5	James Shaw (GBR)	EF Education–EasyPost	+ 2' 15"
6	Jai Hindley (AUS)	Bora–Hansgrohe	+ 2' 39"
7	Carlos Rodriguez (ESP)	INEOS Grenadiers	+ 2' 39"
8	Simon Yates (GBR)	Team Jayco–AlUla	+ 2' 39"
9	Adam Yates (GBR)	UAE Team Emirates	+ 3' 11"
10	Romain Bardet (FRA)	Team dsm–firmenich	+ 3' 11"

General classification after Stage 6
Rank	Rider	Team	Time
1	Jonas Vingegaard (DEN)	Team Jumbo–Visma	26h 10' 44"
2	Tadej Pogačar (SLO)	UAE Team Emirates	+ 25"
3	Jai Hindley (AUS)	Bora–Hansgrohe	+ 1' 34"
4	Simon Yates (GBR)	Team Jayco–AlUla	+ 3' 14"
5	Carlos Rodriguez (ESP)	INEOS Grenadiers	+ 3' 30"
6	Adam Yates (GBR)	UAE Team Emirates	+ 3' 40"
7	David Gaudu (FRA)	Groupama–FDJ	+ 4' 03"
8	Romain Bardet (FRA)	Team dsm–firmenich	+ 4' 43"
9	Tom Pidcock (GBR)	INEOS Grenadiers	+ 4' 43"
10	Sepp Kuss (USA)	Team Jumbo–Visma	+ 5' 28"

== Stage 7 ==
7 July 2023 – Mont-de-Marsan to Bordeaux, 170 km (110 mi)

Stage 7 was a flat stage ending in a bunch sprint in Bordeaux. The sprint was won by Philipsen again, narrowly beating Mark Cavendish (Astana Qazaqstan Team), whose bicycle gears slipped within metres of the finish line.

Stage 7 Result
Rank	Rider	Team	Time
1	Jasper Philipsen (BEL)	Alpecin–Deceuninck	3h 46' 28"
2	Mark Cavendish (GBR)	Astana Qazaqstan Team	+ 0"
3	Biniam Girmay (ERI)	Intermarché–Circus–Wanty	+ 0"
4	Luca Mozzato (ITA)	Arkéa–Samsic	+ 0"
5	Dylan Groenewegen (NED)	Team Jayco–AlUla	+ 0"
6	Jordi Meeus (BEL)	Bora–Hansgrohe	+ 0"
7	Phil Bauhaus (GER)	Team Bahrain Victorious	+ 0"
8	Bryan Coquard (FRA)	Cofidis	+ 0"
9	Alexander Kristoff (NOR)	Uno-X Pro Cycling Team	+ 0"
10	Mads Pedersen (DEN)	Lidl–Trek	+ 0"

General classification after Stage 7
Rank	Rider	Team	Time
1	Jonas Vingegaard (DEN)	Team Jumbo–Visma	29h 57' 12"
2	Tadej Pogačar (SLO)	UAE Team Emirates	+ 25"
3	Jai Hindley (AUS)	Bora–Hansgrohe	+ 1' 34"
4	Simon Yates (GBR)	Team Jayco–AlUla	+ 3' 14"
5	Carlos Rodriguez (ESP)	INEOS Grenadiers	+ 3' 30"
6	Adam Yates (GBR)	UAE Team Emirates	+ 3' 40"
7	David Gaudu (FRA)	Groupama–FDJ	+ 4' 03"
8	Romain Bardet (FRA)	Team dsm–firmenich	+ 4' 43"
9	Tom Pidcock (GBR)	INEOS Grenadiers	+ 4' 43"
10	Sepp Kuss (USA)	Team Jumbo–Visma	+ 5' 28"

== Stage 8 ==
8 July 2023 – Libourne to Limoges, 201 km (125 mi)

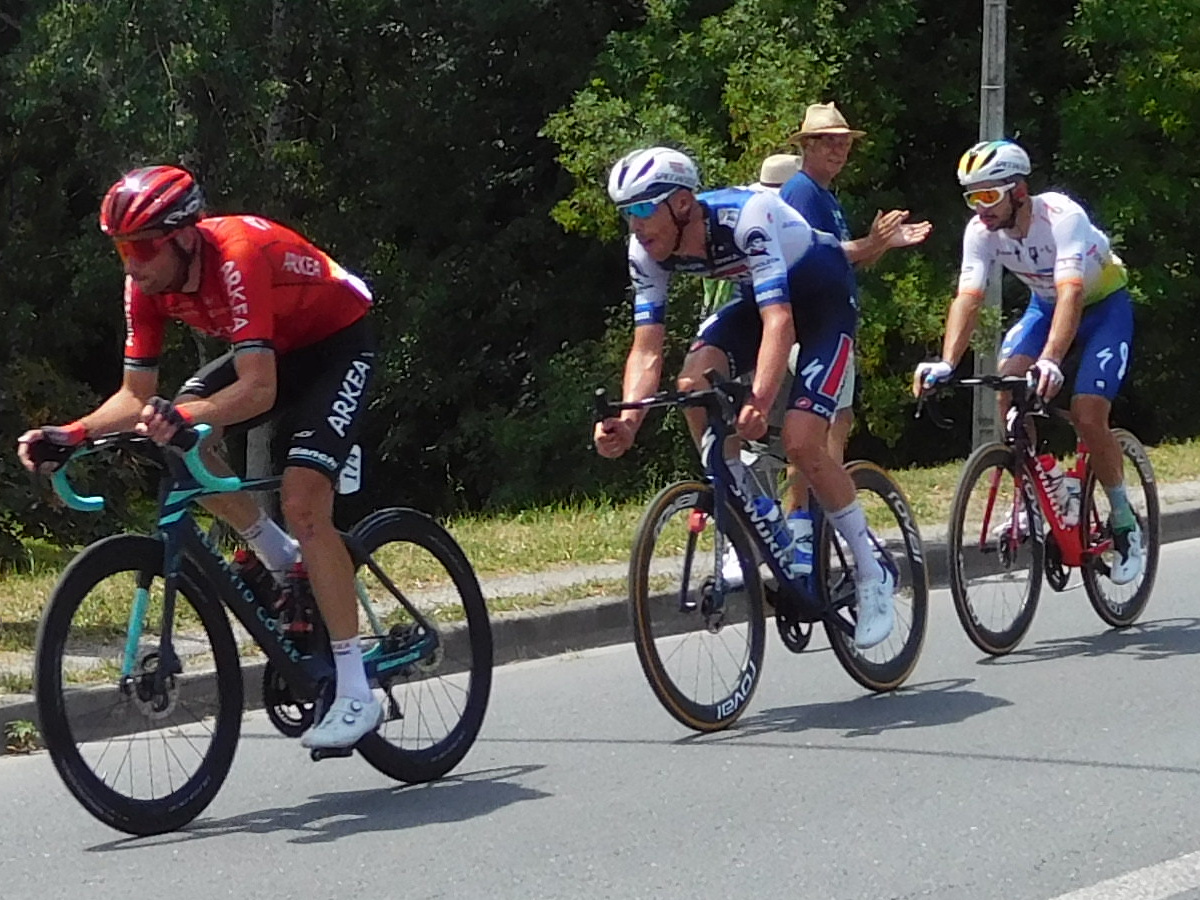
Breakaway riders on stage 8 - Anthony Delaplace, Tim Declercq and Anthony Turgis

Stage 8 put an end to Cavendish's attempt to break the record for most stage wins, as an injury sustained in a crash forced him to abandon the Tour; the stage was won in a sprint by Mads Pedersen.

Stage 8 Result
Rank	Rider	Team	Time
1	Mads Pedersen (DEN)	Lidl–Trek	4h 12' 26"
2	Jasper Philipsen (BEL)	Alpecin–Deceuninck	+ 0"
3	Wout van Aert (BEL)	Team Jumbo–Visma	+ 0"
4	Dylan Groenewegen (NED)	Team Jayco–AlUla	+ 0"
5	Nils Eekhoff (NED)	Team dsm–firmenich	+ 0"
6	Bryan Coquard (FRA)	Cofidis	+ 0"
7	Jasper De Buyst (BEL)	Lotto–Dstny	+ 0"
8	Rasmus Tiller (NOR)	Uno-X Pro Cycling Team	+ 0"
9	Corbin Strong (NZL)	Israel–Premier Tech	+ 0"
10	Tadej Pogačar (SLO)	UAE Team Emirates	+ 0"

General classification after Stage 8
Rank	Rider	Team	Time
1	Jonas Vingegaard (DEN)	Team Jumbo–Visma	34h 09' 38"
2	Tadej Pogačar (SLO)	UAE Team Emirates	+ 25"
3	Jai Hindley (AUS)	Bora–Hansgrohe	+ 1' 34"
4	Carlos Rodriguez (ESP)	INEOS Grenadiers	+ 3' 30"
5	Adam Yates (GBR)	UAE Team Emirates	+ 3' 40"
6	Simon Yates (GBR)	Team Jayco–AlUla	+ 4' 01"
7	David Gaudu (FRA)	Groupama–FDJ	+ 4' 03"
8	Romain Bardet (FRA)	Team dsm–firmenich	+ 4' 43"
9	Tom Pidcock (GBR)	INEOS Grenadiers	+ 4' 43"
10	Sepp Kuss (USA)	Team Jumbo–Visma	+ 5' 28"

== Stage 9 ==
9 July 2023 – Saint-Léonard-de-Noblat to Puy de Dôme, 182.5 km (113.4 mi)

The Tour returned to the Puy de Dôme for the first time since 1988, with a summit finish. A 14-man breakaway emerged early; late in the stage, Matteo Jorgenson (Movistar Team) broke away from the breakaway and led the race alone for most of the last 47 km before being overtaken in the last 500 metres by Michael Woods (Israel–Premier Tech), who won the stage at the top of the Puy de Dôme. Vingegaard retained the yellow jersey, but lost time to Pogačar, who crossed the finish line eight seconds ahead of him.

Stage 9 Result
Rank	Rider	Team	Time
1	Michael Woods (CAN)	Israel–Premier Tech	4h 19' 41"
2	Pierre Latour (FRA)	Team TotalEnergies	+ 28"
3	Matej Mohorič (SLO)	Team Bahrain Victorious	+ 35"
4	Matteo Jorgenson (USA)	Movistar Team	+ 36"
5	Clément Berthet (FRA)	AG2R Citroën Team	+ 55"
6	Neilson Powless (USA)	EF Education–EasyPost	+ 1' 23"
7	Alexey Lutsenko (KAZ)	Astana Qazaqstan Team	+ 1' 39"
8	Jonas Gregaard (DEN)	Uno-X Pro Cycling Team	+ 1' 58"
9	Mathieu Burgaudeau (FRA)	Team TotalEnergies	+ 2' 16"
10	David de la Cruz (ESP)	Astana Qazaqstan Team	+ 2' 34"

General classification after Stage 9
Rank	Rider	Team	Time
1	Jonas Vingegaard (DEN)	Team Jumbo–Visma	38h 37' 46"
2	Tadej Pogačar (SLO)	UAE Team Emirates	+ 17"
3	Jai Hindley (AUS)	Bora–Hansgrohe	+ 2' 40"
4	Carlos Rodriguez (ESP)	INEOS Grenadiers	+ 4' 22"
5	Adam Yates (GBR)	UAE Team Emirates	+ 4' 39"
6	Simon Yates (GBR)	Team Jayco–AlUla	+ 4' 44"
7	Tom Pidcock (GBR)	INEOS Grenadiers	+ 5' 26"
8	David Gaudu (FRA)	Groupama–FDJ	+ 6' 01"
9	Sepp Kuss (USA)	Team Jumbo–Visma	+ 6' 45"
10	Romain Bardet (FRA)	Team dsm–firmenich	+ 6' 58"

== Rest day 1 ==
10 July 2023 – Clermont-Ferrand

== Stage 10 ==
11 July 2023 – Vulcania to Issoire, 167.5 km (104.1 mi)

After the first rest day, stage 10 had a chaotic beginning, with many groups of riders—at one point including Vingegaard and Pogačar—attempting to break away before being caught by the peloton; a stable breakaway emerged around the halfway point of the stage. Krists Neilands (Israel–Premier Tech), attacked the breakaway group and was solo leader for much of the last section of the stage, but was eventually caught by other breakaway riders including Pello Bilbao (Team Bahrain Victorious), who went on to win the stage. Bilbao dedicated his victory to his late teammate Gino Mäder, who had died after a crash in the Tour de Suisse the previous month.

Stage 10 Result
Rank	Rider	Team	Time
1	Pello Bilbao (ESP)	Team Bahrain Victorious	3h 52' 34"
2	Georg Zimmermann (GER)	Intermarché–Circus–Wanty	+ 0"
3	Ben O'Connor (AUS)	AG2R Citroën Team	+ 0"
4	Krists Neilands (LAT)	Israel–Premier Tech	+ 0"
5	Jhoan Esteban Chaves (COL)	EF Education–EasyPost	+ 0"
6	Antonio Pedrero (ESP)	Movistar Team	+ 3"
7	Mattias Skjelmose (DEN)	Lidl–Trek	+ 27"
8	Michał Kwiatkowski (POL)	INEOS Grenadiers	+ 27"
9	Warren Barguil (FRA)	Arkéa–Samsic	+ 30"
10	Julian Alaphilippe (FRA)	Soudal–Quick-Step	+ 32"

General classification after Stage 10
Rank	Rider	Team	Time
1	Jonas Vingegaard (DEN)	Team Jumbo–Visma	42h 33' 13"
2	Tadej Pogačar (SLO)	UAE Team Emirates	+ 17"
3	Jai Hindley (AUS)	Bora–Hansgrohe	+ 2' 40"
4	Carlos Rodriguez (ESP)	INEOS Grenadiers	+ 4' 22"
5	Pello Bilbao (ESP)	Team Bahrain Victorious	+ 4' 34"
6	Adam Yates (GBR)	UAE Team Emirates	+ 4' 39"
7	Simon Yates (GBR)	Team Jayco–AlUla	+ 4' 44"
8	Tom Pidcock (GBR)	INEOS Grenadiers	+ 5' 26"
9	David Gaudu (FRA)	Groupama–FDJ	+ 6' 01"
10	Sepp Kuss (USA)	Team Jumbo–Visma	+ 6' 45"

== Stage 11 ==
12 July 2023 – Clermont-Ferrand to Moulins, 180 km (110 mi)

Jasper Philipsen took his fourth stage-win of the Tour in a sprint on the eleventh stage to Moulins.

Stage 11 Result
Rank	Rider	Team	Time
1	Jasper Philipsen (BEL)	Alpecin–Deceuninck	4h 01' 07"
2	Dylan Groenewegen (NED)	Team Jayco–AlUla	+ 0"
3	Phil Bauhaus (GER)	Team Bahrain Victorious	+ 0"
4	Bryan Coquard (FRA)	Cofidis	+ 0"
5	Mads Pedersen (DEN)	Lidl–Trek	+ 0"
6	Alexander Kristoff (NOR)	Uno-X Pro Cycling Team	+ 0"
7	Luca Mozzato (ITA)	Arkéa–Samsic	+ 0"
8	Peter Sagan (SVK)	Team TotalEnergies	+ 0"
9	Wout van Aert (BEL)	Team Jumbo–Visma	+ 0"
10	Sam Welsford (AUS)	Team dsm–firmenich	+ 0"

General classification after Stage 11
Rank	Rider	Team	Time
1	Jonas Vingegaard (DEN)	Team Jumbo–Visma	46h 34' 27"
2	Tadej Pogačar (SLO)	UAE Team Emirates	+ 17"
3	Jai Hindley (AUS)	Bora–Hansgrohe	+ 2' 40"
4	Carlos Rodriguez (ESP)	INEOS Grenadiers	+ 4' 22"
5	Pello Bilbao (ESP)	Team Bahrain Victorious	+ 4' 34"
6	Adam Yates (GBR)	UAE Team Emirates	+ 4' 39"
7	Simon Yates (GBR)	Team Jayco–AlUla	+ 4' 44"
8	Tom Pidcock (GBR)	INEOS Grenadiers	+ 5' 26"
9	David Gaudu (FRA)	Groupama–FDJ	+ 6' 01"
10	Sepp Kuss (USA)	Team Jumbo–Visma	+ 6' 45"
