= Col de Marie-Blanque =

Mountain pass in the French Pyrenees

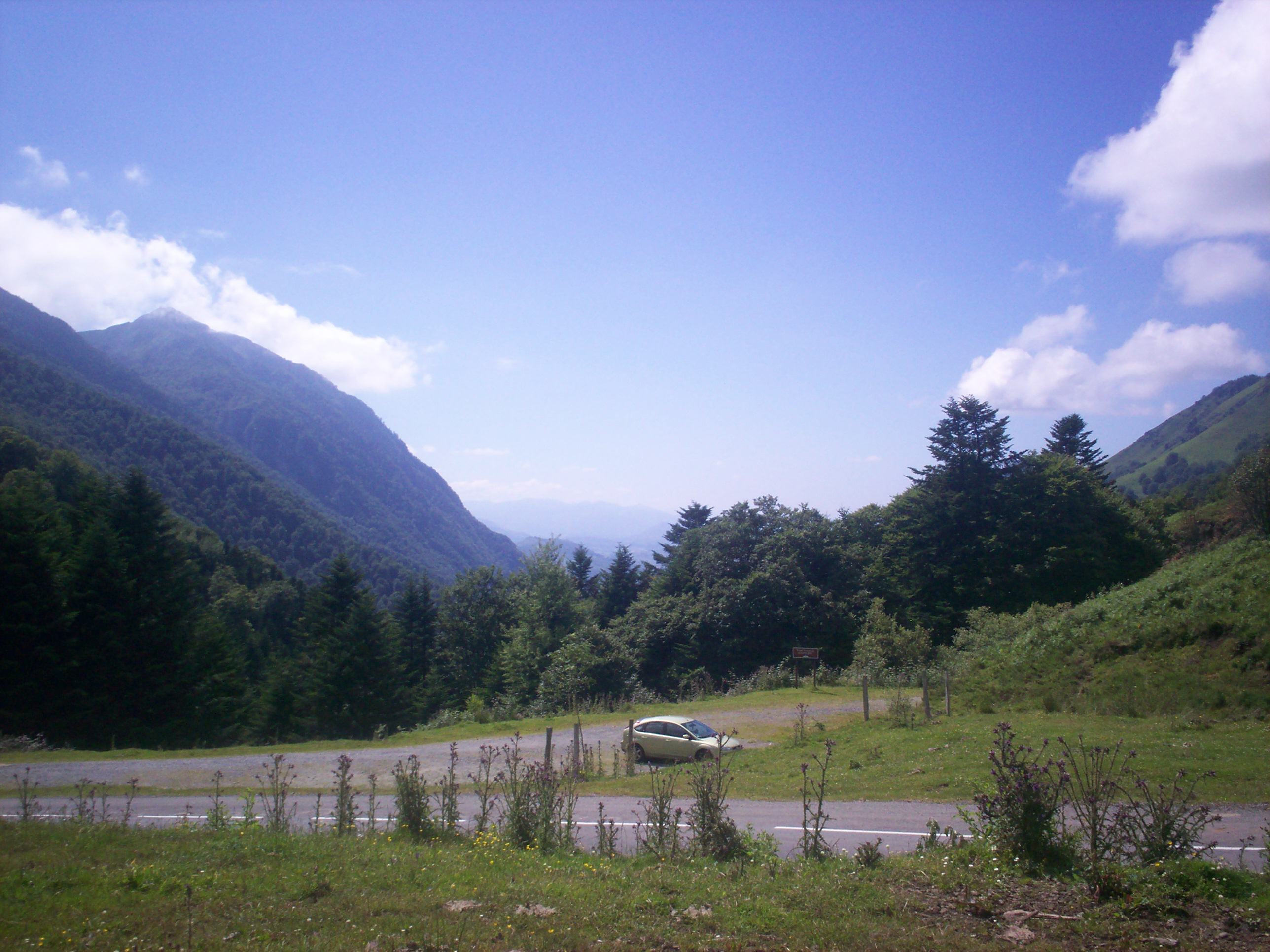

- Location within Pyrenees
- Elevation: 1,035 m (3,396 ft)
- Traversed by: D294

Third Approach
- Location: Pyrénées-Atlantiques, France
- Range: Pyrenees
- Coordinates: 43°4′13″N 0°30′27″W

Col de Marie-Blanque (elevation 1,035 m (3,396 ft)) is a mountain pass in the western Pyrenees in the department of Pyrénées-Atlantiques in France. The pass is situated south-east of Oloron-Sainte-Marie and connects the valleys of the Aspe and the Ossau rivers.

== Details of the climb ==
The western side of the climb, starts from Escot on the N134. The climb is 9.1 km (5.7 mi) long at an average gradient of 7.75% (height gain – 705 m (2,313 ft)). Although relatively short, there are several long sections with gradients in excess of 13%.

From Louvie-Juzon (east), the climb is 15.0 km (9.3 mi) long. Over this distance, it gains 615 m (2,018 ft) at an average gradient of 4.1%. The climb proper starts at Bielle on the D934 from where it is 11.5 km (7.1 mi) long, gaining 585 m (1,919 ft) at an average gradient of 5.1%, with a maximum of 8.5% near the start. En route, the climb passes the Plateau de Bénou.

== Tour de France ==
The pass was first used in the Tour de France in 1978 and has been crossed 15 times by the tour, most recently in the 2023 Tour de France.

=== Appearances in Tour de France ===
Year	Stage	Category	Start	Finish	Leader at the summit
2023	5	1	Pau	Laruns	Jai Hindley (AUS)
2020	9	1	Pau	Laruns	Marc Hirschi (SUI)
2010	17	1	Pau	Col du Tourmalet	Juan Antonio Flecha (ESP)
2007	16	1	Orthez	Gourette–Col d'Aubisque	Mauricio Soler (COL)
2006	10	1	Cambo-les-Bains	Pau	Cyril Dessel (FRA)
2005	16	1	Mourenx	Pau	Jörg Ludewig (DEU)
2000	10	1	Dax	Hautacam	Javier Otxoa (ESP)
1996	17	2	Argelès-Gazost	Pamplona	Neil Stephens (AUS)
1995	16	2	Tarbes	Pau	Stage neutralised
1992	2	1	San Sebastián	Pau	Richard Virenque (FRA)
1990	17	1	Lourdes	Pau	Dominique Arnaud (FRA)
1989	9	1	Pau	Cauterets	Robert Forest (FRA)
1987	14	1	Pau	Luz-Ardiden	Gilbert Duclos-Lassalle (FRA)
1987	13	1	Bayonne	Pau	Luis Herrera (COL)
1986	12	1	Bayonne	Pau	Pedro Delgado (ESP)
1978	10	2	Biarritz	Pau	Michel Pollentier (BEL)
