= List of teams and cyclists in the 2026 Giro d'Italia =

List of cyclists

The following is a list of teams and cyclists that participated in the 2026 Giro d'Italia.

== Teams ==
Twenty-three teams participated in the race. All 18 UCI WorldTeams were automatically invited. They were joined by five UCI ProTeams.

UCI WorldTeams

- Alpecin–Premier Tech
- Decathlon CMA CGM
- EF Education–EasyPost
- Groupama–FDJ United
- Lidl–Trek
- Lotto–Intermarché
- Movistar Team
- Netcompany INEOS
- NSN Cycling Team
- Red Bull–Bora–Hansgrohe
- Soudal–Quick-Step
- Team Bahrain Victorious
- Team Jayco–AlUla
- Team Picnic–PostNL
- Visma–Lease a Bike
- UAE Team Emirates XRG
- Uno-X Mobility
- XDS Astana Team

UCI ProTeams

- Bardiani–CSF 7 Saber
- Pinarello–Q36.5 Pro Cycling Team
- Team Polti VisitMalta
- Tudor Pro Cycling Team
- Unibet Rose Rockets

== Cyclists ==
Legend
| No. | Starting number worn by the rider during the Giro |
| Pos. | Position in the general classification |
| Time | Deficit to the winner of the general classification |
| ‡ | Denotes riders born on or after 1 January 2001 eligible for the young rider classification |
| General classification | Denotes the winner of the general classification |
| Points classification | Denotes the winner of the points classification |
| Mountains classification | Denotes the winner of the mountains classification |
| Young rider classification | Denotes the winner of the young rider classification (eligibility indicated by ‡) |
| Combativity award | Denotes the winner of the combativity award |
| DNS | Denotes a rider who did not start a stage, followed by the stage before which he withdrew |
| DNF | Denotes a rider who did not finish a stage, followed by the stage in which he withdrew |
| DSQ | Denotes a rider who was disqualified from the race, followed by the stage in which this occurred |
| HD | Denotes a rider finished outside the time limit, followed by the stage in which they did so |
Ages correct as of Friday 8 May 2026, the date on which the Giro began

=== By starting number ===
| No. | Name | Nationality | Team | Age | Pos. | Time |
|---|---|---|---|---|---|---|
| 1 | Kaden Groves | Australia | Alpecin–Premier Tech | 27 | DNF-4 | – |
| 2 | Tobias Bayer | Austria | Alpecin–Premier Tech | 26 | 80 | + 4h 00' 21" |
| 3 | Francesco Busatto ‡ | Italy | Alpecin–Premier Tech | 23 | 81 | + 4h 01' 30" |
| 4 | Jonas Geens | Belgium | Alpecin–Premier Tech | 27 | 107 | + 4h 32' 34" |
| 5 | Edward Planckaert | Belgium | Alpecin–Premier Tech | 31 | DNF-11 | – |
| 6 | Jensen Plowright | Australia | Alpecin–Premier Tech | 25 | 130 | + 5h 30' 57" |
| 7 | Johan Price-Pejtersen | Denmark | Alpecin–Premier Tech | 26 | 140 | + 5h 47' 55" |
| 8 | Luca Vergallito | Italy | Alpecin–Premier Tech | 28 | 91 | + 4h 16' 46" |
| 11 | Santiago Buitrago | Colombia | Team Bahrain Victorious | 26 | DNF-2 | – |
| 12 | Damiano Caruso | Italy | Team Bahrain Victorious | 38 | 9 | + 11' 24" |
| 13 | Robert Stannard | Australia | Team Bahrain Victorious | 27 | 104 | + 4h 31' 17" |
| 14 | Fran Miholjević ‡ | Croatia | Team Bahrain Victorious | 23 | 96 | + 4h 23' 50" |
| 15 | Afonso Eulálio ‡ | Portugal | Team Bahrain Victorious | 24 | 6 | + 9' 39" |
| 16 | Mathijs Paasschens | Netherlands | Team Bahrain Victorious | 30 | 87 | + 4h 12' 28" |
| 17 | Alec Segaert ‡ | Belgium | Team Bahrain Victorious | 23 | 72 | + 3h 48' 39" |
| 18 | Edoardo Zambanini ‡ | Italy | Team Bahrain Victorious | 25 | 45 | + 2h 30' 59" |
| 21 | Filippo Magli | Italy | Bardiani–CSF 7 Saber | 27 | 116 | + 4h 53' 41" |
| 22 | Martin Marcellusi | Italy | Bardiani–CSF 7 Saber | 26 | 120 | + 5h 12' 44" |
| 23 | Luca Paletti ‡ | Italy | Bardiani–CSF 7 Saber | 21 | 101 | + 4h 27' 50" |
| 24 | Vicente Rojas ‡ | Chile | Bardiani–CSF 7 Saber | 24 | 103 | + 4h 30' 37" |
| 25 | Manuele Tarozzi | Italy | Bardiani–CSF 7 Saber | 27 | 82 | + 4h 02' 50" |
| 26 | Nikita Tsvetkov ‡ | Uzbekistan | Bardiani–CSF 7 Saber | 21 | 109 | + 4h 36' 23" |
| 27 | Filippo Turconi ‡ | Italy | Bardiani–CSF 7 Saber | 20 | 98 | + 4h 25' 07" |
| 28 | Enrico Zanoncello | Italy | Bardiani–CSF 7 Saber | 28 | DSQ-15 | – |
| 31 | Felix Gall | Austria | Decathlon CMA CGM | 28 | 2 | + 5' 22" |
| 32 | Tobias Lund Andresen ‡ | Denmark | Decathlon CMA CGM | 23 | 122 | + 5h 17' 08" |
| 33 | Tord Gudmestad ‡ | Norway | Decathlon CMA CGM | 25 | 136 | + 5h 37' 26" |
| 34 | Gregor Mühlberger | Austria | Decathlon CMA CGM | 32 | 15 | + 23' 53" |
| 35 | Oliver Naesen | Belgium | Decathlon CMA CGM | 35 | 78 | + 3h 59' 42" |
| 36 | Rasmus Søjberg Pedersen ‡ | Denmark | Decathlon CMA CGM | 23 | 113 | + 4h 45' 22" |
| 37 | Callum Scotson | Australia | Decathlon CMA CGM | 29 | 33 | + 1h 50' 13" |
| 38 | Johannes Staune-Mittet ‡ | Norway | Decathlon CMA CGM | 24 | 34 | + 1h 54' 21" |
| 41 | Jefferson Alexander Cepeda | Ecuador | EF Education–EasyPost | 27 | 64 | + 3h 34' 37" |
| 42 | Samuele Battistella | Italy | EF Education–EasyPost | 27 | DNF-5 | – |
| 43 | Markel Beloki ‡ | Spain | EF Education–EasyPost | 20 | 35 | + 1h 57' 24" |
| 44 | Madis Mihkels ‡ | Estonia | EF Education–EasyPost | 22 | 111 | + 4h 42' 46" |
| 45 | Darren Rafferty ‡ | Ireland | EF Education–EasyPost | 22 | 92 | + 4h 18' 31" |
| 46 | James Shaw | Great Britain | EF Education–EasyPost | 29 | DNS-19 | – |
| 47 | Michael Valgren | Denmark | EF Education–EasyPost | 34 | DNS-19 | – |
| 48 | Jardi Christiaan van der Lee ‡ | Netherlands | EF Education–EasyPost | 24 | 73 | + 3h 51' 21" |
| 51 | Rémi Cavagna | France | Groupama–FDJ United | 30 | 110 | + 4h 39' 53" |
| 52 | Cyril Barthe | France | Groupama–FDJ United | 30 | 108 | + 4h 34' 21" |
| 53 | Axel Huens ‡ | France | Groupama–FDJ United | 24 | 83 | + 4h 02' 51" |
| 54 | Johan Jacobs | Switzerland | Groupama–FDJ United | 29 | 93 | + 4h 19' 24" |
| 55 | Josh Kench ‡ | New Zealand | Groupama–FDJ United | 25 | 52 | + 2h 45' 22" |
| 56 | Paul Penhoët ‡ | France | Groupama–FDJ United | 24 | 128 | + 5h 29' 32" |
| 57 | Rémy Rochas | France | Groupama–FDJ United | 29 | 53 | + 2h 51' 41" |
| 58 | Brieuc Rolland ‡ | France | Groupama–FDJ United | 22 | 56 | + 3h 07' 56" |
| 61 | Giulio Ciccone | Italy | Lidl–Trek | 31 | 20 | + 56' 40" |
| 62 | Simone Consonni | Italy | Lidl–Trek | 31 | 150 | + 6h 02' 53" |
| 63 | Derek Gee-West | Canada | Lidl–Trek | 28 | 5 | + 7' 56" |
| 64 | Amanuel Ghebreigzabhier | Eritrea | Lidl–Trek | 31 | 89 | + 4h 15' 40" |
| 65 | Jonathan Milan | Italy | Lidl–Trek | 25 | 124 | + 5h 25' 34" |
| 66 | Matteo Sobrero | Italy | Lidl–Trek | 28 | 54 | + 3h 04' 43" |
| 67 | Tim Torn Teutenberg ‡ | Germany | Lidl–Trek | 23 | 137 | + 5h 38' 50" |
| 68 | Max Walscheid | Germany | Lidl–Trek | 32 | 141 | + 5h 49' 50" |
| 71 | Arnaud De Lie ‡ | Belgium | Lotto–Intermarché | 24 | DNF-4 | – |
| 72 | Toon Aerts | Belgium | Lotto–Intermarché | 32 | 58 | + 3h 17' 13" |
| 73 | Joshua Giddings ‡ | Great Britain | Lotto–Intermarché | 22 | DNF-5 | – |
| 74 | Simone Gualdi ‡ | Italy | Lotto–Intermarché | 21 | 44 | + 2h 23' 20" |
| 75 | Milan Menten | Belgium | Lotto–Intermarché | 29 | DNS-5 | – |
| 76 | Lorenzo Rota | Italy | Lotto–Intermarché | 30 | 68 | + 3h 43' 54" |
| 77 | Jonas Rutsch | Germany | Lotto–Intermarché | 28 | 106 | + 4h 32' 30" |
| 78 | Lennert Van Eetvelt ‡ | Belgium | Lotto–Intermarché | 24 | DNS-12 | – |
| 81 | Enric Mas | Spain | Movistar Team | 31 | 32 | + 1h 48' 28" |
| 82 | Orluis Aular | Venezuela | Movistar Team | 29 | 79 | + 3h 59' 55" |
| 83 | Iván García Cortina | Spain | Movistar Team | 30 | 114 | + 4h 45' 40" |
| 84 | Juan Pedro López | Spain | Movistar Team | 28 | 41 | + 2h 06' 30" |
| 85 | Lorenzo Milesi ‡ | Italy | Movistar Team | 24 | 49 | + 2h 37' 10" |
| 86 | Nelson Oliveira | Portugal | Movistar Team | 37 | 66 | + 3h 38' 31" |
| 87 | Javier Romo | Spain | Movistar Team | 27 | DNF-12 | – |
| 88 | Einer Rubio | Colombia | Movistar Team | 28 | 23 | + 1h 04' 26" |
| 91 | Egan Bernal | Colombia | Netcompany INEOS | 29 | 10 | + 12' 54" |
| 92 | Thymen Arensman | Netherlands | Netcompany INEOS | 26 | 4 | + 7' 02" |
| 93 | Filippo Ganna | Italy | Netcompany INEOS | 29 | 99 | + 4h 25' 32" |
| 94 | Jack Haig | Australia | Netcompany INEOS | 32 | 40 | + 2h 05' 45" |
| 95 | Magnus Sheffield ‡ | United States | Netcompany INEOS | 24 | 42 | + 2h 13' 46" |
| 96 | Embret Svestad-Bårdseng ‡ | Norway | Netcompany INEOS | 23 | 24 | + 1h 13' 39" |
| 97 | Connor Swift | Great Britain | Netcompany INEOS | 30 | 77 | + 3h 57' 12" |
| 98 | Ben Turner | Great Britain | Netcompany INEOS | 26 | 76 | + 3h 56' 03" |
| 101 | Alessandro Pinarello ‡ | Italy | NSN Cycling Team | 22 | 61 | + 3h 27' 38" |
| 102 | Jan Hirt | Czechia | NSN Cycling Team | 35 | 12 | + 22' 06" |
| 103 | Ryan Mullen | Ireland | NSN Cycling Team | 31 | 134 | + 5h 34' 35" |
| 104 | Nick Schultz | Australia | NSN Cycling Team | 31 | 62 | + 3h 29' 39" |
| 105 | Dion Smith | New Zealand | NSN Cycling Team | 33 | 123 | + 5h 23' 40" |
| 106 | Jake Stewart | Great Britain | NSN Cycling Team | 26 | DNF-8 | – |
| 107 | Corbin Strong | New Zealand | NSN Cycling Team | 26 | 88 | + 4h 13' 20" |
| 109 | Ethan Vernon | Great Britain | NSN Cycling Team | 25 | DNF-19 | – |
| 111 | Sjoerd Bax | Netherlands | Pinarello–Q36.5 Pro Cycling Team | 30 | DNS-12 | – |
| 112 | Fabio Christen ‡ | Switzerland | Pinarello–Q36.5 Pro Cycling Team | 23 | DNF-8 | – |
| 113 | David de la Cruz | Spain | Pinarello–Q36.5 Pro Cycling Team | 37 | 14 | + 23' 14" |
| 114 | Mark Donovan | Great Britain | Pinarello–Q36.5 Pro Cycling Team | 27 | 38 | + 2h 03' 23" |
| 115 | David González | Spain | Pinarello–Q36.5 Pro Cycling Team | 30 | 100 | + 4h 27' 13" |
| 116 | Chris Harper | Australia | Pinarello–Q36.5 Pro Cycling Team | 31 | 17 | + 30' 43" |
| 117 | Matteo Moschetti | Italy | Pinarello–Q36.5 Pro Cycling Team | 29 | DNS-2 | – |
| 118 | Nickolas Zukowsky | Canada | Pinarello–Q36.5 Pro Cycling Team | 27 | DNF-17 | – |
| 121 | Jai Hindley | Australia | Red Bull–Bora–Hansgrohe | 30 | 3 | + 6' 25" |
| 122 | Giovanni Aleotti | Italy | Red Bull–Bora–Hansgrohe | 26 | 28 | + 1h 27' 04" |
| 123 | Nico Denz | Germany | Red Bull–Bora–Hansgrohe | 32 | 121 | + 5h 15' 36" |
| 124 | Gianni Moscon | Italy | Red Bull–Bora–Hansgrohe | 32 | 74 | + 3h 54' 30" |
| 125 | Giulio Pellizzari ‡ | Italy | Red Bull–Bora–Hansgrohe | 22 | 21 | + 58' 16" |
| 126 | Mick van Dijke | Netherlands | Red Bull–Bora–Hansgrohe | 26 | 75 | + 3h 55' 29" |
| 127 | Aleksandr Vlasov | | Red Bull–Bora–Hansgrohe | 30 | 25 | + 1h 15' 21" |
| 128 | Ben Zwiehoff | Germany | Red Bull–Bora–Hansgrohe | 32 | 31 | + 1h 47' 36" |
| 131 | Paul Magnier ‡ | France | Soudal–Quick-Step | 22 | 115 | + 4h 52' 33" |
| 132 | Ayco Bastiaens | Belgium | Soudal–Quick-Step | 29 | 127 | + 5h 28' 38" |
| 133 | Gianmarco Garofoli ‡ | Italy | Soudal–Quick-Step | 23 | 29 | + 1h 39' 03" |
| 134 | Andrea Raccagni Noviero ‡ | Italy | Soudal–Quick-Step | 22 | 55 | + 3h 05' 26" |
| 135 | Jasper Stuyven | Belgium | Soudal–Quick-Step | 34 | 70 | + 3h 46' 19" |
| 136 | Fabio Van den Bossche | Belgium | Soudal–Quick-Step | 25 | 105 | + 4h 31' 26" |
| 137 | Dries Van Gestel | Belgium | Soudal–Quick-Step | 31 | 131 | + 5h 32' 43" |
| 138 | Filippo Zana | Italy | Soudal–Quick-Step | 27 | 60 | + 3h 27' 17" |
| 141 | Ben O'Connor | Australia | Team Jayco–AlUla | 30 | 16 | + 24' 12" |
| 142 | Pascal Ackermann | Germany | Team Jayco–AlUla | 32 | DNS-16 | – |
| 143 | Koen Bouwman | Netherlands | Team Jayco–AlUla | 32 | 26 | + 1h 21' 21" |
| 144 | Robert Donaldson ‡ | Great Britain | Team Jayco–AlUla | 24 | 118 | + 5h 04' 29" |
| 145 | Felix Engelhardt | Germany | Team Jayco–AlUla | 25 | DNS-6 | – |
| 146 | Alan Hatherly | South Africa | Team Jayco–AlUla | 30 | 48 | + 2h 35' 45" |
| 147 | Christopher Juul-Jensen | Denmark | Team Jayco–AlUla | 36 | 86 | + 4h 09' 17" |
| 148 | Andrea Vendrame | Italy | Team Jayco–AlUla | 31 | DNS-3 | – |
| 151 | Warren Barguil | France | Team Picnic–PostNL | 34 | 57 | + 3h 12' 32" |
| 152 | Timo de Jong | Netherlands | Team Picnic–PostNL | 27 | DNF-5 | – |
| 153 | Sean Flynn | Great Britain | Team Picnic–PostNL | 26 | DNS-21 | – |
| 154 | Chris Hamilton | Australia | Team Picnic–PostNL | 30 | 84 | + 4h 04' 39" |
| 155 | Gijs Leemreize | Netherlands | Team Picnic–PostNL | 26 | 95 | + 4h 23' 36" |
| 156 | Tim Naberman | Netherlands | Team Picnic–PostNL | 26 | 132 | + 5h 33' 04" |
| 157 | Frank van den Broek | Netherlands | Team Picnic–PostNL | 25 | 149 | + 5h 59' 46" |
| 158 | Casper van Uden ‡ | Netherlands | Team Picnic–PostNL | 24 | 126 | + 5h 26' 24" |
| 161 | Mattia Bais | Italy | Team Polti VisitMalta | 29 | 85 | + 4h 08' 18" |
| 162 | Ludovico Crescioli ‡ | Italy | Team Polti VisitMalta | 22 | 27 | + 1h 22' 57" |
| 163 | Giovanni Lonardi | Italy | Team Polti VisitMalta | 29 | 133 | + 5h 33' 10" |
| 164 | Mirco Maestri | Italy | Team Polti VisitMalta | 34 | 97 | + 4h 24' 46" |
| 165 | Andrea Mifsud | Malta | Team Polti VisitMalta | 26 | 69 | + 3h 44' 47" |
| 166 | Thomas Pesenti | Italy | Team Polti VisitMalta | 26 | 71 | + 3h 46' 42" |
| 167 | Diego Pablo Sevilla | Spain | Team Polti VisitMalta | 30 | 94 | + 4h 23' 28" |
| 168 | Alessandro Tonelli | Italy | Team Polti VisitMalta | 33 | 47 | + 2h 35' 14" |
| 171 | Jonas Vingegaard | Denmark | Visma–Lease a Bike | 29 | 1 | 83h 22' 51" |
| 172 | Victor Campenaerts | Belgium | Visma–Lease a Bike | 34 | 43 | + 2h 22' 36" |
| 173 | Wilco Kelderman | Netherlands | Visma–Lease a Bike | 35 | DNS-4 | – |
| 174 | Timo Kielich | Belgium | Visma–Lease a Bike | 26 | 119 | + 5h 07' 50" |
| 175 | Sepp Kuss | United States | Visma–Lease a Bike | 31 | 13 | + 22' 12" |
| 176 | Bart Lemmen | Netherlands | Visma–Lease a Bike | 30 | 30 | + 1h 43' 35" |
| 177 | Davide Piganzoli ‡ | Italy | Visma–Lease a Bike | 23 | 8 | + 10' 52" |
| 178 | Tim Rex ‡ | Belgium | Visma–Lease a Bike | 22 | 90 | + 4h 15' 41" |
| 181 | Michael Storer | Australia | Tudor Pro Cycling Team | 29 | 7 | + 10' 13" |
| 182 | Will Barta | United States | Tudor Pro Cycling Team | 30 | 36 | + 1h 59' 28" |
| 183 | Robin Froidevaux | Switzerland | Tudor Pro Cycling Team | 27 | 147 | + 5h 56' 27" |
| 184 | Fabian Lienhard | Switzerland | Tudor Pro Cycling Team | 32 | 146 | + 5h 55' 15" |
| 185 | Luca Mozzato | Italy | Tudor Pro Cycling Team | 28 | 142 | + 5h 53' 17" |
| 186 | Mathys Rondel ‡ | France | Tudor Pro Cycling Team | 22 | 11 | + 15' 12" |
| 187 | Florian Stork | Germany | Tudor Pro Cycling Team | 29 | 39 | + 2h 05' 31" |
| 188 | Larry Warbasse | United States | Tudor Pro Cycling Team | 35 | 51 | + 2h 40' 46" |
| 191 | Adam Yates | Great Britain | UAE Team Emirates XRG | 33 | DNS-3 | – |
| 192 | Igor Arrieta ‡ | Spain | UAE Team Emirates XRG | 23 | 19 | + 55' 50" |
| 193 | Mikkel Bjerg | Denmark | UAE Team Emirates XRG | 27 | 102 | + 4h 30' 32" |
| 194 | Jan Christen ‡ | Switzerland | UAE Team Emirates XRG | 21 | 59 | + 3h 26' 08" |
| 195 | Jhonatan Narváez | Ecuador | UAE Team Emirates XRG | 29 | DNF-19 | – |
| 196 | Marc Soler | Spain | UAE Team Emirates XRG | 32 | DNF-2 | – |
| 197 | António Morgado ‡ | Portugal | UAE Team Emirates XRG | 22 | 125 | + 5h 25' 56" |
| 198 | Jay Vine | Australia | UAE Team Emirates XRG | 30 | DNF-2 | – |
| 201 | Dylan Groenewegen | Netherlands | Unibet Rose Rockets | 32 | 148 | + 5h 57' 17" |
| 202 | Hartthijs de Vries | Netherlands | Unibet Rose Rockets | 29 | 145 | + 5h 54' 57" |
| 203 | Matyáš Kopecký ‡ | Czechia | Unibet Rose Rockets | 23 | 139 | + 5h 46' 46" |
| 204 | Tomáš Kopecký | Czechia | Unibet Rose Rockets | 26 | 143 | + 5h 53' 23" |
| 205 | Lukáš Kubiš | Slovakia | Unibet Rose Rockets | 26 | 138 | + 5h 42' 19" |
| 206 | Niklas Larsen | Denmark | Unibet Rose Rockets | 29 | 129 | + 5h 30' 53" |
| 207 | Wout Poels | Netherlands | Unibet Rose Rockets | 38 | 22 | + 1h 02' 10" |
| 208 | Elmar Reinders | Netherlands | Unibet Rose Rockets | 34 | 144 | + 5h 54' 57" |
| 211 | Erlend Blikra | Norway | Uno-X Mobility | 29 | OTL-11 | – |
| 212 | Markus Hoelgaard | Norway | Uno-X Mobility | 31 | 67 | + 3h 42' 04" |
| 213 | Ådne Holter | Norway | Uno-X Mobility | 25 | DNF-2 | – |
| 214 | Johannes Kulset ‡ | Norway | Uno-X Mobility | 22 | 18 | + 34' 26" |
| 215 | Fredrik Dversnes | Norway | Uno-X Mobility | 29 | 112 | + 4h 44' 07" |
| 216 | Andreas Leknessund | Norway | Uno-X Mobility | 26 | 37 | + 2h 00' 30" |
| 217 | Sakarias Koller Løland ‡ | Norway | Uno-X Mobility | 24 | 117 | + 5h 00' 06" |
| 218 | Martin Tjøtta ‡ | Norway | Uno-X Mobility | 25 | DNF-11 | – |
| 221 | Davide Ballerini | Italy | XDS Astana Team | 31 | DNF-11 | – |
| 222 | Alberto Bettiol | Italy | XDS Astana Team | 32 | 63 | + 3h 34' 04" |
| 223 | Arjen Livyns | Belgium | XDS Astana Team | 31 | 135 | + 5h 35' 05" |
| 224 | Harold Martín López | Ecuador | XDS Astana Team | 25 | 50 | + 2h 38' 11" |
| 225 | Matteo Malucelli | Italy | XDS Astana Team | 32 | 151 | + 6h 13' 45" |
| 226 | Christian Scaroni | Italy | XDS Astana Team | 28 | DNF-14 | – |
| 227 | Guillermo Thomas Silva ‡ | Uruguay | XDS Astana Team | 24 | 65 | + 3h 35' 10" |
| 228 | Diego Ulissi | Italy | XDS Astana Team | 36 | 46 | + 2h 31' 00" |

=== By team ===
(Belgium) Alpecin–Premier Tech (APT)
| No. | Rider | Pos. |
|---|---|---|
| 1 | Kaden Groves (AUS) | DNF-4 |
| 2 | Tobias Bayer (AUT) | 80 |
| 3 | Francesco Busatto (ITA) | 81 |
| 4 | Jonas Geens (BEL) | 107 |
| 5 | Edward Planckaert (BEL) | DNF-11 |
| 6 | Jensen Plowright (AUS) | 130 |
| 7 | Johan Price-Pejtersen (DEN) | 140 |
| 8 | Luca Vergallito (ITA) | 91 |

Team Bahrain Victorious (TBV)
| No. | Rider | Pos. |
|---|---|---|
| 11 | Santiago Buitrago (COL) | DNF-2 |
| 12 | Damiano Caruso (ITA) | 9 |
| 13 | Fran Miholjević (CRO) | 96 |
| 14 | Afonso Eulálio (POR) | 6 |
| 15 | Mathijs Paasschens (NED) | 87 |
| 16 | Alec Segaert (BEL) | 72 |
| 17 | Robert Stannard (AUS) | 104 |
| 18 | Edoardo Zambanini (ITA) | 45 |

(Italy) Bardiani–CSF 7 Saber (BCS)
| No. | Rider | Pos. |
|---|---|---|
| 21 | Filippo Magli (ITA) | 116 |
| 22 | Martin Marcellusi (ITA) | 120 |
| 23 | Luca Paletti (ITA) | 101 |
| 24 | Vicente Rojas (CHI) | 103 |
| 25 | Manuele Tarozzi (ITA) | 82 |
| 26 | Nikita Tsvetkov (UZB) | 109 |
| 27 | Filippo Turconi (ITA) | 98 |
| 28 | Enrico Zanoncello (ITA) | DSQ-15 |

(France) Decathlon CMA CGM (DCT)
| No. | Rider | Pos. |
|---|---|---|
| 31 | Felix Gall (AUT) | 2 |
| 32 | Tobias Lund Andresen (DEN) | 122 |
| 33 | Tord Gudmestad (NOR) | 136 |
| 34 | Gregor Mühlberger (AUT) | 15 |
| 35 | Oliver Naesen (BEL) | 78 |
| 36 | Rasmus Søjberg Pedersen (DEN) | 113 |
| 37 | Callum Scotson (AUS) | 33 |
| 38 | Johannes Staune-Mittet (NOR) | 34 |

(United States) EF Education–EasyPost (EFE)
| No. | Rider | Pos. |
|---|---|---|
| 41 | Jefferson Alexander Cepeda (ECU) | 64 |
| 42 | Samuele Battistella (ITA) | DNF-5 |
| 43 | Markel Beloki (ESP) | 35 |
| 44 | Madis Mihkels (EST) | 111 |
| 45 | Darren Rafferty (IRL) | 92 |
| 46 | James Shaw (GBR) | DNS-19 |
| 47 | Michael Valgren (DEN) | DNS-19 |
| 48 | Jardi Christiaan van der Lee (NED) | 73 |

(France) Groupama–FDJ United (GFC)
| No. | Rider | Pos. |
|---|---|---|
| 51 | Rémi Cavagna (FRA) | 110 |
| 52 | Cyril Barthe (FRA) | 108 |
| 53 | Axel Huens (FRA) | 83 |
| 54 | Johan Jacobs (SUI) | 93 |
| 55 | Josh Kench (NZL) | 52 |
| 56 | Paul Penhoët (FRA) | 128 |
| 57 | Rémy Rochas (FRA) | 53 |
| 58 | Brieuc Rolland (FRA) | 56 |

(Germany) Lidl–Trek (LTK)
| No. | Rider | Pos. |
|---|---|---|
| 61 | Giulio Ciccone (ITA) | 20 |
| 62 | Simone Consonni (ITA) | 150 |
| 63 | Derek Gee-West (CAN) | 5 |
| 64 | Amanuel Ghebreigzabhier (ERI) | 89 |
| 65 | Jonathan Milan (ITA) | 124 |
| 66 | Matteo Sobrero (ITA) | 54 |
| 67 | Tim Torn Teutenberg (GER) | 137 |
| 68 | Max Walscheid (GER) | 141 |

(Belgium) Lotto–Intermarché (LOI)
| No. | Rider | Pos. |
|---|---|---|
| 71 | Arnaud De Lie (BEL) | DNF-4 |
| 72 | Toon Aerts (BEL) | 58 |
| 73 | Joshua Giddings (GBR) | DNF-5 |
| 74 | Simone Gualdi (ITA) | 44 |
| 75 | Milan Menten (BEL) | DNS-5 |
| 76 | Lorenzo Rota (ITA) | 68 |
| 77 | Jonas Rutsch (GER) | 106 |
| 78 | Lennert Van Eetvelt (BEL) | DNS-12 |

(Spain) Movistar Team (MOV)
| No. | Rider | Pos. |
|---|---|---|
| 81 | Enric Mas (ESP) | 32 |
| 82 | Orluis Aular (VEN) | 79 |
| 83 | Iván García Cortina (ESP) | 114 |
| 84 | Juan Pedro López (ESP) | 41 |
| 85 | Lorenzo Milesi (ITA) | 49 |
| 86 | Nelson Oliveira (POR) | 66 |
| 87 | Javier Romo (ESP) | DNF-12 |
| 88 | Einer Rubio (COL) | 23 |

(United Kingdom) Netcompany INEOS (NCI)
| No. | Rider | Pos. |
|---|---|---|
| 91 | Egan Bernal (COL) | 10 |
| 92 | Thymen Arensman (NED) | 4 |
| 93 | Filippo Ganna (ITA) | 99 |
| 94 | Jack Haig (AUS) | 40 |
| 95 | Magnus Sheffield (USA) | 42 |
| 96 | Embret Svestad-Bårdseng (NOR) | 24 |
| 97 | Connor Swift (GBR) | 77 |
| 98 | Ben Turner (GBR) | 76 |

(Switzerland) NSN Cycling Team (NSN)
| No. | Rider | Pos. |
|---|---|---|
| 101 | Alessandro Pinarello (ITA) | 61 |
| 102 | Jan Hirt (CZE) | 12 |
| 103 | Ryan Mullen (IRL) | 134 |
| 104 | Nick Schultz (AUS) | 62 |
| 105 | Dion Smith (NZL) | 123 |
| 106 | Jake Stewart (GBR) | DNF-8 |
| 107 | Corbin Strong (NZL) | 88 |
| 109 | Ethan Vernon (GBR) | DNF-19 |

(Switzerland) Pinarello–Q36.5 Pro Cycling Team (PQT)
| No. | Rider | Pos. |
|---|---|---|
| 111 | Sjoerd Bax (NED) | DNS-12 |
| 112 | Fabio Christen (SUI) | DNF-8 |
| 113 | David de la Cruz (ESP) | 14 |
| 114 | Mark Donovan (GBR) | 38 |
| 115 | David González (ESP) | 100 |
| 116 | Chris Harper (AUS) | 17 |
| 117 | Matteo Moschetti (ITA) | DNS-2 |
| 118 | Nickolas Zukowsky (CAN) | DNF-17 |

(Germany) Red Bull–Bora–Hansgrohe (RBH)
| No. | Rider | Pos. |
|---|---|---|
| 121 | Jai Hindley (AUS) | 3 |
| 122 | Giovanni Aleotti (ITA) | 28 |
| 123 | Nico Denz (GER) | 121 |
| 124 | Gianni Moscon (ITA) | 74 |
| 125 | Giulio Pellizzari (ITA) | 21 |
| 126 | Mick van Dijke (NED) | 75 |
| 127 | Aleksandr Vlasov | 25 |
| 128 | Ben Zwiehoff (GER) | 31 |

(Belgium) Soudal–Quick-Step (SOQ)
| No. | Rider | Pos. |
|---|---|---|
| 131 | Paul Magnier (FRA) | 115 |
| 132 | Ayco Bastiaens (BEL) | 127 |
| 133 | Gianmarco Garofoli (ITA) | 29 |
| 134 | Andrea Raccagni Noviero (ITA) | 55 |
| 135 | Jasper Stuyven (BEL) | 70 |
| 136 | Fabio Van den Bossche (BEL) | 105 |
| 137 | Dries Van Gestel (BEL) | 131 |
| 138 | Filippo Zana (ITA) | 60 |

(Australia) Team Jayco–AlUla (JAY)
| No. | Rider | Pos. |
|---|---|---|
| 141 | Ben O'Connor (AUS) | 16 |
| 142 | Pascal Ackermann (GER) | DNS-16 |
| 143 | Koen Bouwman (NED) | 26 |
| 144 | Robert Donaldson (GBR) | 118 |
| 145 | Felix Engelhardt (GER) | DNS-6 |
| 146 | Alan Hatherly (RSA) | 48 |
| 147 | Christopher Juul-Jensen (DEN) | 86 |
| 148 | Andrea Vendrame (ITA) | DNS-3 |

(Netherlands) Team Picnic–PostNL (TPP)
| No. | Rider | Pos. |
|---|---|---|
| 151 | Warren Barguil (FRA) | 57 |
| 152 | Timo de Jong (NED) | DNF-5 |
| 153 | Sean Flynn (GBR) | DNS-21 |
| 154 | Chris Hamilton (AUS) | 84 |
| 155 | Gijs Leemreize (NED) | 95 |
| 156 | Tim Naberman (NED) | 132 |
| 157 | Frank van den Broek (NED) | 149 |
| 158 | Casper van Uden (NED) | 126 |

(Italy) Team Polti VisitMalta (PTV)
| No. | Rider | Pos. |
|---|---|---|
| 161 | Mattia Bais (ITA) | 85 |
| 162 | Ludovico Crescioli (ITA) | 27 |
| 163 | Giovanni Lonardi (ITA) | 133 |
| 164 | Mirco Maestri (ITA) | 97 |
| 165 | Andrea Mifsud (MLT) | 69 |
| 166 | Thomas Pesenti (ITA) | 71 |
| 167 | Diego Pablo Sevilla (ESP) | 94 |
| 168 | Alessandro Tonelli (ITA) | 47 |

(Netherlands) Visma–Lease a Bike (TVL)
| No. | Rider | Pos. |
|---|---|---|
| 171 | Jonas Vingegaard (DEN) | 1 |
| 172 | Victor Campenaerts (BEL) | 43 |
| 173 | Wilco Kelderman (NED) | DNS-4 |
| 174 | Timo Kielich (BEL) | 119 |
| 175 | Sepp Kuss (USA) | 13 |
| 176 | Bart Lemmen (NED) | 30 |
| 177 | Davide Piganzoli (ITA) | 8 |
| 178 | Tim Rex (BEL) | 90 |

(Switzerland) Tudor Pro Cycling Team (TUD)
| No. | Rider | Pos. |
|---|---|---|
| 181 | Michael Storer (AUS) | 7 |
| 182 | Will Barta (USA) | 36 |
| 183 | Robin Froidevaux (SUI) | 147 |
| 184 | Fabian Lienhard (SUI) | 146 |
| 185 | Luca Mozzato (ITA) | 142 |
| 186 | Mathys Rondel (FRA) | 11 |
| 187 | Florian Stork (GER) | 39 |
| 188 | Larry Warbasse (USA) | 51 |

(United Arab Emirates) UAE Team Emirates XRG (UEX)
| No. | Rider | Pos. |
|---|---|---|
| 191 | Adam Yates (GBR) | DNS-3 |
| 192 | Igor Arrieta (ESP) | 19 |
| 193 | Mikkel Bjerg (DEN) | 102 |
| 194 | Jan Christen (SUI) | 59 |
| 195 | Jhonatan Narváez (ECU) | DNF-19 |
| 196 | Marc Soler (ESP) | DNF-2 |
| 197 | António Morgado (POR) | 125 |
| 198 | Jay Vine (AUS) | DNF-2 |

(France) Unibet Rose Rockets (URR)
| No. | Rider | Pos. |
|---|---|---|
| 201 | Dylan Groenewegen (NED) | 148 |
| 202 | Hartthijs de Vries (NED) | 145 |
| 203 | Matyáš Kopecký (CZE) | 139 |
| 204 | Tomáš Kopecký (CZE) | 143 |
| 205 | Lukáš Kubiš (SVK) | 138 |
| 206 | Niklas Larsen (DEN) | 129 |
| 207 | Wout Poels (NED) | 22 |
| 208 | Elmar Reinders (NED) | 144 |

(Norway) Uno-X Mobility (UXM)
| No. | Rider | Pos. |
|---|---|---|
| 211 | Erlend Blikra (NOR) | OTL-11 |
| 212 | Markus Hoelgaard (NOR) | 67 |
| 213 | Ådne Holter (NOR) | DNF-2 |
| 214 | Johannes Kulset (NOR) | 18 |
| 215 | Fredrik Dversnes (NOR) | 112 |
| 216 | Andreas Leknessund (NOR) | 37 |
| 217 | Sakarias Koller Løland (NOR) | 117 |
| 218 | Martin Tjøtta (NOR) | DNF-11 |

(Kazakhstan) XDS Astana Team (XAT)
| No. | Rider | Pos. |
|---|---|---|
| 221 | Davide Ballerini (ITA) | DNF-11 |
| 222 | Alberto Bettiol (ITA) | 63 |
| 223 | Arjen Livyns (BEL) | 135 |
| 224 | Harold Martín López (ECU) | 50 |
| 225 | Matteo Malucelli (ITA) | 151 |
| 226 | Christian Scaroni (ITA) | DNF-14 |
| 227 | Guillermo Thomas Silva (URU) | 65 |
| 228 | Diego Ulissi (ITA) | 46 |

=== By nationality ===
| Country | No. of riders | Finished | Stage wins |
|---|---|---|---|
| Australia | 12 | 10 | |
| Austria | 3 | 3 | |
| Belgium | 16 | 12 | 1 (Alec Segaert) |
| Canada | 2 | 1 | |
| Chile | 1 | 1 | |
| Colombia | 3 | 2 | |
| Croatia | 1 | 1 | |
| Czechia | 3 | 3 | |
| Denmark | 8 | 7 | 6 (Michael Valgren, Jonas Vingegaard x5) |
| Ecuador | 3 | 2 | 3 (Jhonatan Narváez x3) |
| Eritrea | 1 | 1 | |
| Estonia | 1 | 1 | |
| France | 9 | 9 | 3 (Paul Magnier x3) |
| Germany | 8 | 6 | |
| Great Britain | 10 | 4 | |
| Ireland | 2 | 2 | |
| Italy | 41 | 35 | 4 (Davide Ballerini, Alberto Bettiol, Filippo Ganna, Jonathan Milan) |
| Malta | 1 | 1 | |
| Netherlands | 17 | 14 | |
| New Zealand | 3 | 3 | |
| Norway | 11 | 8 | 1 (Fredrik Dversnes) |
| Portugal | 3 | 3 | |
| Slovakia | 1 | 1 | |
| South Africa | 1 | 1 | |
| Spain | 10 | 8 | 1 (Igor Arrieta) |
| Switzerland | 5 | 4 | |
| United States | 4 | 4 | 1 (Sepp Kuss) |
| Uruguay | 1 | 1 | 1 (Guillermo Thomas Silva) |
| Uzbekistan | 1 | 1 | |
| Venezuela | 1 | 1 | |
| | 1 | 1 | |
| Total | 184 | 151 | 21 |
