= 2025 Arctic Race of Norway =

2025 UCI ProSeries

Race details
- Dates: 7–10 August 2025
- Stages: 4
- Distance: 666.2 km (414.0 mi)
- Winning time: 15h 49' 03"

Results
Jersey awarded to the overall winner	Winner	Corbin Strong (NZL)	(Israel–Premier Tech)
	Second	Tom Pidcock (GBR)	(Q36.5 Pro Cycling Team)
	Third	Christian Scaroni (ITA)	(XDS Astana Team)
Jersey awarded to the points classification winner	Points	Corbin Strong (NZL)	(Israel–Premier Tech)
Jersey awarded to the mountains classification winner	Mountains	Storm Ingebrigtsen (NOR)	(Team Coop–Repsol)
Jersey awarded to the youth classification winner	Youth	Corbin Strong (NZL)	(Israel–Premier Tech)
	Team	(Kazakhstan) XDS Astana Team	

The 2025 Arctic Race of Norway was a road cycling stage race that took place between 7 and 10 August 2025. It was the 12th edition of the Arctic Race of Norway, which is rated as a 2.Pro event on the 2025 UCI ProSeries calendar.

== Teams ==
Six UCI WorldTeams, nine UCI ProTeams, two UCI Continental teams, and the Norwegian national team made up the eighteen teams that competed in the race.

UCI WorldTeams

- Arkéa–B&B Hotels
- Cofidis
- Intermarché–Wanty
- Team Jayco–AlUla
- Team Picnic–PostNL
- XDS Astana Team

UCI ProTeams

- Burgos Burpellet BH
- Equipo Kern Pharma
- Israel–Premier Tech
- Q36.5 Pro Cycling Team
- Team Flanders–Baloise
- Team TotalEnergies
- Tudor Pro Cycling Team
- Unibet Tietema Rockets
- Uno-X Mobility

UCI Continental Teams

- Lillehammer CK Continental Team
- Team Coop–Repsol

National Teams

- Norway

== Route ==
Stage characteristics and winners
Stage	Date	Route	Distance	Type	Winner
1	7 August	Borkenes to Harstad	182 km (113 mi)	Hilly stage	Corbin Strong (NZL)
2	8 August	Tennevoll to Sørreisa	166.5 km (103.5 mi)	Hilly stage	Alexander Kristoff (NOR)
3	9 August	Husøy to Målselv	182.4 km (113.3 mi)	Hilly stage	Tom Pidcock (GBR)
4	10 August	Tromsø to Tromsø	135.3 km (84.1 mi)	Hilly stage	Fredrik Dversnes (NOR)
Total			666.2 km (414.0 mi)		

== Stages ==
=== Stage 1 ===
7 August 2025 — Borkenes to Harstad, 182 km (113 mi)

Stage 1 Result
Rank	Rider	Team	Time
1	Corbin Strong (NZL)	Israel–Premier Tech	4h 02' 22"
2	Riley Sheehan (USA)	Israel–Premier Tech	+ 0"
3	Rasmus Tiller (NOR)	Uno-X Mobility	+ 0"
4	Rick Pluimers (NED)	Tudor Pro Cycling Team	+ 0"
5	Jenthe Biermans (BEL)	Arkéa–B&B Hotels	+ 0"
6	Karsten Larsen Feldmann (NOR)	Team Coop–Repsol	+ 0"
7	Davide Ballerini (ITA)	XDS Astana Team	+ 0"
8	Tord Gudmestad (NOR)	Norway	+ 0"
9	Pau Miquel (ESP)	Equipo Kern Pharma	+ 0"
10	Clément Champoussin (FRA)	XDS Astana Team	+ 0"

General classification after Stage 1
Rank	Rider	Team	Time
1	Corbin Strong (NZL)	Israel–Premier Tech	4h 02' 12"
2	Riley Sheehan (USA)	Israel–Premier Tech	+ 4"
3	Fredrik Dversnes (NOR)	Uno-X Mobility	+ 4"
4	Romain Combaud (FRA)	Team Picnic–PostNL	+ 4"
5	Rasmus Tiller (NOR)	Uno-X Mobility	+ 6"
6	Abram Stockman (BEL)	Unibet Tietema Rockets	+ 9"
7	Rick Pluimers (NED)	Tudor Pro Cycling Team	+ 10"
8	Jenthe Biermans (BEL)	Arkéa–B&B Hotels	+ 10"
9	Karsten Larsen Feldmann (NOR)	Team Coop–Repsol	+ 10"
10	Davide Ballerini (ITA)	XDS Astana Team	+ 10"

=== Stage 2 ===
8 August 2025 — Tennevoll to Sørreisa, 166.5 km (103.5 mi)

Stage 2 Result
Rank	Rider	Team	Time
1	Alexander Kristoff (NOR)	Uno-X Mobility	3h 55' 08"
2	Tom Van Asbroeck (BEL)	Israel–Premier Tech	+ 0"
3	Karsten Larsen Feldmann (NOR)	Team Coop–Repsol	+ 0"
4	Jules Hesters (BEL)	Team Flanders–Baloise	+ 0"
5	Cees Bol (NED)	XDS Astana Team	+ 0"
6	Jenthe Biermans (BEL)	Arkéa–B&B Hotels	+ 0"
7	Arne Marit (BEL)	Intermarché–Wanty	+ 0"
8	Tord Gudmestad (NOR)	Norway	+ 0"
9	Bjoern Koerdt (GBR)	Team Picnic–PostNL	+ 0"
10	Tom Pidcock (GBR)	Q36.5 Pro Cycling Team	+ 0"

General classification after Stage 2
Rank	Rider	Team	Time
1	Corbin Strong (NZL)	Israel–Premier Tech	7h 57' 20"
2	Alexander Kristoff (NOR)	Uno-X Mobility	+ 0"
3	Riley Sheehan (USA)	Israel–Premier Tech	+ 4"
4	Fredrik Dversnes (NOR)	Uno-X Mobility	+ 4"
5	Morthen Wang Baksaas (NOR)	Norway	+ 4"
6	Romain Combaud (FRA)	Team Picnic–PostNL	+ 4"
7	Josh Burnett (NZL)	Burgos Burpellet BH	+ 5"
8	Eirik Vang Aas (NOR)	Team Coop–Repsol	+ 5"
9	Karsten Larsen Feldmann (NOR)	Team Coop–Repsol	+ 6"
10	Rasmus Tiller (NOR)	Uno-X Mobility	+ 6"

=== Stage 3 ===
9 August 2025 — Husøy to Målselv, 182.4 km (113.3 mi)

Stage 3 Result
Rank	Rider	Team	Time
1	Tom Pidcock (GBR)	Q36.5 Pro Cycling Team	4h 43' 16"
2	Corbin Strong (NZL)	Israel–Premier Tech	+ 0"
3	Christian Scaroni (ITA)	XDS Astana Team	+ 12"
4	Clément Champoussin (FRA)	XDS Astana Team	+ 16"
5	Kevin Vermaerke (USA)	Team Picnic–PostNL	+ 17"
6	Martin Tjøtta (NOR)	Arkéa–B&B Hotels	+ 19"
7	Felix Engelhardt (GER)	Team Jayco–AlUla	+ 21"
8	Riley Sheehan (USA)	Israel–Premier Tech	+ 21"
9	Alan Hatherly (RSA)	Team Jayco–AlUla	+ 21"
10	Hugo Houle (CAN)	Israel–Premier Tech	+ 21"

General classification after Stage 3
Rank	Rider	Team	Time
1	Corbin Strong (NZL)	Israel–Premier Tech	12h 40' 30"
2	Tom Pidcock (GBR)	Q36.5 Pro Cycling Team	+ 6"
3	Christian Scaroni (ITA)	XDS Astana Team	+ 23"
4	Riley Sheehan (USA)	Israel–Premier Tech	+ 31"
5	Clément Champoussin (FRA)	XDS Astana Team	+ 32"
6	Kevin Vermaerke (USA)	Team Picnic–PostNL	+ 33"
7	Martin Tjøtta (NOR)	Arkéa–B&B Hotels	+ 35"
8	Felix Engelhardt (GER)	Team Jayco–AlUla	+ 37"
9	Hugo Houle (CAN)	Israel–Premier Tech	+ 37"
10	Sven Erik Bystrøm (NOR)	Norway	+ 37"

=== Stage 4 ===
10 August 2025 — Tromsø to Tromsø, 135.3 km (84.1 mi)

Stage 4 Result
Rank	Rider	Team	Time
1	Fredrik Dversnes (NOR)	Uno-X Mobility	3h 08' 40"
2	Corbin Strong (NZL)	Israel–Premier Tech	+ 0"
3	Davide Ballerini (ITA)	XDS Astana Team	+ 0"
4	Rick Pluimers (NED)	Tudor Pro Cycling Team	+ 0"
5	Sakarias Koller Løland (NOR)	Uno-X Mobility	+ 0"
6	Tom Pidcock (GBR)	Q36.5 Pro Cycling Team	+ 0"
7	Mats Wenzel (LUX)	Equipo Kern Pharma	+ 0"
8	Martin Tjøtta (NOR)	Arkéa–B&B Hotels	+ 0"
9	Stefano Oldani (ITA)	Cofidis	+ 0"
10	Sven Erik Bystrøm (NOR)	Norway	+ 0"

General classification after Stage 4
Rank	Rider	Team	Time
1	Corbin Strong (NZL)	Israel–Premier Tech	15h 49' 03"
2	Tom Pidcock (GBR)	Q36.5 Pro Cycling Team	+ 11"
3	Christian Scaroni (ITA)	XDS Astana Team	+ 28"
4	Riley Sheehan (USA)	Israel–Premier Tech	+ 35"
5	Clément Champoussin (FRA)	XDS Astana Team	+ 39"
6	Kevin Vermaerke (USA)	Team Picnic–PostNL	+ 39"
7	Martin Tjøtta (NOR)	Arkéa–B&B Hotels	+ 42"
8	Felix Engelhardt (GER)	Team Jayco–AlUla	+ 43"
9	Sven Erik Bystrøm (NOR)	Norway	+ 44"
10	Mats Wenzel (LUX)	Equipo Kern Pharma	+ 44"

== Classification leadership table ==
Classification leadership by stage
Stage	Winner	General classification	Points classification	Mountains classification	Young rider classification	Team classification
1	Corbin Strong	Corbin Strong	Corbin Strong	Storm Ingebrigtsen	Corbin Strong	XDS Astana Team
2	Alexander Kristoff	Corbin Strong	Corbin Strong	Storm Ingebrigtsen	Corbin Strong	XDS Astana Team
3	Tom Pidcock	Corbin Strong	Corbin Strong	Storm Ingebrigtsen	Corbin Strong	Israel–Premier Tech
4	Fredrik Dversnes	Corbin Strong	Corbin Strong	Storm Ingebrigtsen	Corbin Strong	XDS Astana Team
Final		Corbin Strong	Corbin Strong	Storm Ingebrigtsen	Corbin Strong	XDS Astana Team

== Classification standings ==
Legend
Denotes the winner of the general classification	Denotes the winner of the points classification
Denotes the winner of the mountains classification	Denotes the winner of the young rider classification

=== General classification ===
Final general classification (1–10)
Rank	Rider	Team	Time
1	Corbin Strong (NZL)	Israel–Premier Tech	15h 49' 03"
2	Tom Pidcock (GBR)	Q36.5 Pro Cycling Team	+ 11"
3	Christian Scaroni (ITA)	XDS Astana Team	+ 28"
4	Riley Sheehan (USA)	Israel–Premier Tech	+ 35"
5	Clément Champoussin (FRA)	XDS Astana Team	+ 39"
6	Kevin Vermaerke (USA)	Team Picnic–PostNL	+ 39"
7	Martin Tjøtta (NOR)	Arkéa–B&B Hotels	+ 42"
8	Felix Engelhardt (GER)	Team Jayco–AlUla	+ 43"
9	Sven Erik Bystrøm (NOR)	Norway	+ 44"
10	Mats Wenzel (LUX)	Equipo Kern Pharma	+ 44"

=== Points classification ===
Final points classification (1–10)
Rank	Rider	Team	Points
1	Corbin Strong (NZL)	Israel–Premier Tech	40
2	Tom Pidcock (GBR)	Q36.5 Pro Cycling Team	23
3	Fredrik Dversnes (NOR)	Uno-X Mobility	21
4	Riley Sheehan (USA)	Israel–Premier Tech	18
5	Karsten Larsen Feldmann (NOR)	Team Coop–Repsol	16
6	Alexander Kristoff (NOR)	Uno-X Mobility	15
7	Rick Pluimers (NED)	Tudor Pro Cycling Team	14
8	Davide Ballerini (ITA)	XDS Astana Team	13
9	Morthen Wang Baksaas (NOR)	Norway	12
10	Christian Scaroni (ITA)	XDS Astana Team	12

=== Mountains classification ===
Final mountains classification (1–10)
Rank	Rider	Team	Points
1	Storm Ingebrigtsen (NOR)	Team Coop–Repsol	24
2	Morthen Wang Baksaas (NOR)	Norway	23
3	Georg Rydningen Martinsen (NOR)	Lillehammer CK Continental Team	12
4	Ulrik Tvedt (NOR)	Lillehammer CK Continental Team	6
5	Davide Ballerini (ITA)	XDS Astana Team	6
6	Tom Pidcock (GBR)	Q36.5 Pro Cycling Team	5
7	Bjoern Koerdt (GBR)	Team Picnic–PostNL	5
8	Jonas Geens (BEL)	Team Flanders–Baloise	5
9	Stefano Oldani (ITA)	Cofidis	4
10	Martin Tjøtta (NOR)	Arkéa–B&B Hotels	3

=== Young rider classification ===
Final young rider classification (1–10)
Rank	Rider	Team	Time
1	Corbin Strong (NZL)	Israel–Premier Tech	15h 49' 03"
2	Riley Sheehan (USA)	Israel–Premier Tech	+ 35"
3	Kevin Vermaerke (USA)	Team Picnic–PostNL	+ 39"
4	Martin Tjøtta (NOR)	Arkéa–B&B Hotels	+ 42"
5	Felix Engelhardt (GER)	Team Jayco–AlUla	+ 43"
6	Mats Wenzel (LUX)	Equipo Kern Pharma	+ 44"
7	Eivind Broholt Fougner (NOR)	Team Coop–Repsol	+ 49"
8	Hugo de la Calle (ESP)	Burgos Burpellet BH	+ 55"
9	Ådne Holter (NOR)	Uno-X Mobility	+ 1' 03"
10	Mattéo Vercher (FRA)	Team TotalEnergies	+ 1' 06"

=== Team classification ===
Final team classification (1–10)
Rank	Team	Time
1	(Kazakhstan) XDS Astana Team	47h 29' 18"
2	(Australia) Team Jayco–AlUla	+ 43"
3	Israel–Premier Tech	+ 55"
4	(Norway) Uno-X Mobility	+ 58"
5	(France) Cofidis	+ 2' 00"
6	(Netherlands) Team Picnic–PostNL	+ 2' 10"
7	(Switzerland) Q36.5 Pro Cycling Team	+ 2' 44"
8	(France) Team TotalEnergies	+ 3' 13"
9	(Spain) Burgos Burpellet BH	+ 3' 34"
10	(France) Arkéa–B&B Hotels	+ 3' 48"
