= 2023 Tour of Norway =

Norwegian cycling race

2023 UCI ProSeries

Race details
- Dates: 26–29 May 2023
- Stages: 3 + Prologue
- Distance: 409.5 km (254.5 mi)

Results
Jersey awarded to the overall winner	Winner	Ben Tulett (GBR)	(Ineos Grenadiers)
	Second	Magnus Sheffield (USA)	(Ineos Grenadiers)
	Third	Thibau Nys (BEL)	(Trek–Segafredo)
Jersey awarded to the points classification winner	Points	Thibau Nys (BEL)	(Trek–Segafredo)
Jersey awarded to the mountains classification winner	Mountains	Joel Nicolau (ESP)	(Caja Rural–Seguros RGA)
Jersey awarded to the youth classification winner	Youth	Ben Tulett (GBR)	(Ineos Grenadiers)
	Team	(United States) EF Education–EasyPost	

The 2023 Tour of Norway was a road cycling stage race that took place between 26 and 29 May 2023 in Norway. The race was rated as a category 2.Pro event on the 2023 UCI ProSeries calendar, and is the 12th edition of the Tour of Norway.

== Teams ==
8 of the 18 UCI WorldTeams, seven UCI ProTeams, three UCI Continental teams, and the Norwegian national team made up the 19 teams that participated in the race.

UCI WorldTeams

- Alpecin–Deceuninck
- Bora–Hansgrohe
- EF Education–EasyPost
- Intermarché–Circus–Wanty
- Ineos Grenadiers
- Team DSM
- Team Jumbo–Visma
- Trek–Segafredo

UCI ProTeams

- Caja Rural–Seguros RGA
- Green Project–Bardiani–CSF–Faizanè
- Human Powered Health
- Q36.5 Pro Cycling Team
- Team Flanders–Baloise
- Tudor Pro Cycling Team
- Uno-X Pro Cycling Team

UCI Continental Teams

- Leopard TOGT Pro Cycling
- Saint Piran
- Team Coop–Repsol

National Teams

- Norway

== Route ==
Stage characteristics and winners
Stage	Date	Course	Distance	Type	Stage winner
P	26 May	Bergen to Mount Fløyen	7.4 km (4.6 mi)	Mountain time trial	Ben Tulett (GBR)
1	27 May	~~Jondal~~ Røldal to Hovden (Note: The distance originally was 206 km, but before the start of the stage, the distance was shortened to 85.2 km due to bad weather conditions.)	85.2 km (52.9 mi)	Intermediate stage	Mike Teunissen (NED)
2	28 May	Valle to Stavanger	165.7 km (103.0 mi)	Intermediate stage	Thibau Nys (BEL)
3	29 May	Stavanger to Stavanger	151.2 km (94.0 mi)	Hilly stage	Alexander Kristoff (NOR)
Total			409.5 km (254.5 mi)		

== Stages ==
=== Prologue ===
26 May 2023 – Bergen to Mount Fløyen, 7.4 km (4.6 mi)

Prologue result
Rank	Rider	Team	Time
1	Ben Tulett (GBR)	Ineos Grenadiers	14' 28"
2	Magnus Sheffield (USA)	Ineos Grenadiers	+ 1"
3	Attila Valter (HUN)	Team Jumbo–Visma	+ 20"
4	Ådne Holter (NOR)	Uno-X Pro Cycling Team	+ 27"
5	Mathias Vacek (CZE)	Trek–Segafredo	+ 28"
6	Thibau Nys (BEL)	Trek–Segafredo	+ 30"
7	Tobias Halland Johannessen (NOR)	Uno-X Pro Cycling Team	+ 31"
8	Rune Herregodts (BEL)	Intermarché–Circus–Wanty	+ 31"
9	Marco Brenner (GER)	Team DSM	+ 32"
10	Alexander Kamp (DEN)	Tudor Pro Cycling Team	+ 32"

General classification after Prologue
Rank	Rider	Team	Time
1	Ben Tulett (GBR)	Ineos Grenadiers	14' 28"
2	Magnus Sheffield (USA)	Ineos Grenadiers	+ 1"
3	Attila Valter (HUN)	Team Jumbo–Visma	+ 20"
4	Ådne Holter (NOR)	Uno-X Pro Cycling Team	+ 27"
5	Mathias Vacek (CZE)	Trek–Segafredo	+ 28"
6	Thibau Nys (BEL)	Trek–Segafredo	+ 30"
7	Tobias Halland Johannessen (NOR)	Uno-X Pro Cycling Team	+ 31"
8	Rune Herregodts (BEL)	Intermarché–Circus–Wanty	+ 31"
9	Marco Brenner (GER)	Team DSM	+ 32"
10	Alexander Kamp (DEN)	Tudor Pro Cycling Team	+ 32"

=== Stage 1 ===
27 May 2023 – ~~Jondal~~ Røldal to Hovden, 85.2 km (52.9 mi)

Stage 1 result
Rank	Rider	Team	Time
1	Mike Teunissen (NED)	Intermarché–Circus–Wanty	1h 58' 30"
2	Tobias Lund Andresen (DEN)	Team DSM	+ 0"
3	Jordi Meeus (BEL)	Bora–Hansgrohe	+ 0"
4	Thibau Nys (BEL)	Trek–Segafredo	+ 0"
5	Alexander Kamp (DEN)	Tudor Pro Cycling Team	+ 0"
6	Tobias Halland Johannessen (NOR)	Uno-X Pro Cycling Team	+ 0"
7	Robbe Ghys (BEL)	Alpecin–Deceuninck	+ 0"
8	Magnus Sheffield (USA)	Ineos Grenadiers	+ 0"
9	Mick van Dijke (NED)	Team Jumbo–Visma	+ 0"
10	Marijn van den Berg (NED)	Tudor Pro Cycling Team	+ 0"

General classification after Stage 1
Rank	Rider	Team	Time
1	Ben Tulett (GBR)	Ineos Grenadiers	2h 12' 58"
2	Magnus Sheffield (USA)	Ineos Grenadiers	+ 1"
3	Attila Valter (HUN)	Team Jumbo–Visma	+ 20"
4	Ådne Holter (NOR)	Uno-X Pro Cycling Team	+ 27"
5	Mathias Vacek (CZE)	Trek–Segafredo	+ 28"
6	Thibau Nys (BEL)	Trek–Segafredo	+ 30"
7	Tobias Halland Johannessen (NOR)	Uno-X Pro Cycling Team	+ 31"
8	Rune Herregodts (BEL)	Intermarché–Circus–Wanty	+ 31"
9	Marco Brenner (GER)	Team DSM	+ 32"
10	Alexander Kamp (DEN)	Tudor Pro Cycling Team	+ 32"

=== Stage 2 ===
28 May 2023 – Valle to Stavanger, 165.7 km (103.0 mi)

Stage 2 result
Rank	Rider	Team	Time
1	Thibau Nys (BEL)	Trek–Segafredo	4h 18' 33"
2	Edward Planckaert (BEL)	Alpecin–Deceuninck	+ 1"
3	Ben Tulett (GBR)	Ineos Grenadiers	+ 1"
4	Mick van Dijke (NED)	Team Jumbo–Visma	+ 1"
5	Tobias Halland Johannessen (NOR)	Uno-X Pro Cycling Team	+ 1"
6	Maurice Ballerstedt (GER)	Alpecin–Deceuninck	+ 1"
7	Tobias Lund Andresen (DEN)	Team DSM	+ 1"
8	Magnus Sheffield (USA)	Ineos Grenadiers	+ 1"
9	Attila Valter (HUN)	Team Jumbo–Visma	+ 1"
10	Jordi Meeus (BEL)	Bora–Hansgrohe	+ 1"

General classification after Stage 2
Rank	Rider	Team	Time
1	Ben Tulett (GBR)	Ineos Grenadiers	6h 31' 28"
2	Magnus Sheffield (USA)	Ineos Grenadiers	+ 5"
3	Thibau Nys (BEL)	Trek–Segafredo	+ 23"
4	Attila Valter (HUN)	Team Jumbo–Visma	+ 24"
5	Ådne Holter (NOR)	Uno-X Pro Cycling Team	+ 31"
6	Mathias Vacek (CZE)	Trek–Segafredo	+ 32"
7	Tobias Halland Johannessen (NOR)	Uno-X Pro Cycling Team	+ 35"
8	Rune Herregodts (BEL)	Intermarché–Circus–Wanty	+ 35"
9	Marco Brenner (GER)	Team DSM	+ 36"
10	Alexander Kamp (DEN)	Tudor Pro Cycling Team	+ 36"

=== Stage 3 ===
29 May 2023 – Stavanger to Stavanger, 151.2 km (94.0 mi)

Stage 3 result
Rank	Rider	Team	Time
1	Alexander Kristoff (NOR)	Uno-X Pro Cycling Team	3h 19' 17"
2	Tobias Lund Andresen (DEN)	Team DSM	+ 0"
3	Jordi Meeus (BEL)	Bora–Hansgrohe	+ 0"
4	Madis Mihkels (EST)	Intermarché–Circus–Wanty	+ 0"
5	Marijn van den Berg (NED)	EF Education–EasyPost	+ 0"
6	Tim van Dijke (NED)	Team Jumbo–Visma	+ 0"
7	Edward Planckaert (BEL)	Alpecin–Deceuninck	+ 0"
8	Rasmus Tiller (NOR)	Uno-X Pro Cycling Team	+ 0"
9	Thibau Nys (BEL)	Trek–Segafredo	+ 0"
10	Vito Braet (BEL)	Team Flanders–Baloise	+ 0"

General classification after Stage 3
Rank	Rider	Team	Time
1	Ben Tulett (GBR)	Ineos Grenadiers	9h 50' 45"
2	Magnus Sheffield (USA)	Ineos Grenadiers	+ 5"
3	Thibau Nys (BEL)	Trek–Segafredo	+ 23"
4	Attila Valter (HUN)	Team Jumbo–Visma	+ 24"
5	Alexander Kamp (DEN)	Tudor Pro Cycling Team	+ 30"
6	Rune Herregodts (BEL)	Intermarché–Circus–Wanty	+ 31"
7	Ådne Holter (NOR)	Uno-X Pro Cycling Team	+ 31"
8	Mathias Vacek (CZE)	Trek–Segafredo	+ 32"
9	Tobias Halland Johannessen (NOR)	Uno-X Pro Cycling Team	+ 33"
10	Marco Brenner (GER)	Team DSM	+ 36"

== Classification leadership table ==
Classification leadership by stage
Stage	Winner	General classification	Points classification	Mountains classification	Young rider classification	Team classification
P	Ben Tulett	Ben Tulett	Ben Tulett	Ben Tulett	Ben Tulett	Ineos Grenadiers
1	Mike Teunissen	Ben Tulett	Magnus Sheffield	Magnus Sheffield	Ben Tulett	Ineos Grenadiers
2	Thibau Nys	Ben Tulett	Thibau Nys	Joel Nicolau	Ben Tulett	Ineos Grenadiers
3	Alexander Kristoff	Ben Tulett	Thibau Nys	Joel Nicolau	Ben Tulett	EF Education–EasyPost
Final		Ben Tulett	Thibau Nys	Joel Nicolau	Ben Tulett	EF Education–EasyPost

== Classification standings ==
Legend
Denotes the winner of the general classification	Denotes the winner of the mountains classification
Denotes the winner of the points classification	Denotes the winner of the young rider classification

=== General classification ===
Final general classification (1–10)
Rank	Rider	Team	Time
1	Ben Tulett (GBR)	Ineos Grenadiers	9h 50' 45"
2	Magnus Sheffield (USA)	Ineos Grenadiers	+ 5"
3	Thibau Nys (BEL)	Trek–Segafredo	+ 23"
4	Attila Valter (HUN)	Team Jumbo–Visma	+ 24"
5	Alexander Kamp (DEN)	Tudor Pro Cycling Team	+ 30"
6	Rune Herregodts (BEL)	Bora–Hansgrohe	+ 31"
7	Ådne Holter (NOR)	Uno-X Pro Cycling Team	+ 31"
8	Mathias Vacek (CZE)	Trek–Segafredo	+ 32"
9	Tobias Halland Johannessen (NOR)	Uno-X Pro Cycling Team	+ 33"
10	Marco Brenner (GER)	Team DSM	+ 36"

=== Points classification ===
Final points classification (1–10)
Rank	Rider	Team	Points
1	Thibau Nys (BEL)	Trek–Segafredo	44
2	Tobias Lund Andresen (DEN)	Team DSM	37
3	Tobias Halland Johannessen (NOR)	Uno-X Pro Cycling Team	32
4	Jordi Meeus (BEL)	Bora–Hansgrohe	32
5	Ben Tulett (GBR)	Ineos Grenadiers	30
6	Magnus Sheffield (USA)	Ineos Grenadiers	30
7	Alexander Kamp (DEN)	Tudor Pro Cycling Team	26
8	Edward Planckaert (BEL)	Alpecin–Deceuninck	23
9	Attila Valter (HUN)	Team Jumbo–Visma	20
10	Mick van Dijke (NED)	Team Jumbo–Visma	19

=== Mountains classification ===
Final mountains classification (1–10)
Rank	Rider	Team	Points
1	Joel Nicolau (ESP)	Caja Rural–Seguros RGA	19
2	Mathias Bregnhøj (DEN)	Leopard TOGT Pro Cycling	15
3	Torbjørn Andre Røed (NOR)	Norway	13
4	Mathias Vacek (CZE)	Trek–Segafredo	9
5	Magnus Sheffield (USA)	Ineos Grenadiers	9
6	Ben Tulett (GBR)	Ineos Grenadiers	8
7	Ådne Holter (NOR)	Uno-X Pro Cycling Team	7
8	Manuele Tarozzi (ITA)	Green Project–Bardiani–CSF–Faizanè	7
9	Dries De Pooter (BEL)	Intermarché–Circus–Wanty	7
10	Lorenzo Milesi (ITA)	Team DSM	6

=== Young rider classification ===
Final young rider classification (1–10)
Rank	Rider	Team	Time
1	Ben Tulett (GBR)	Ineos Grenadiers	9h 50' 45"
2	Magnus Sheffield (USA)	Ineos Grenadiers	+ 5"
3	Thibau Nys (BEL)	Trek–Segafredo	+ 23"
4	Mathias Vacek (CZE)	Trek–Segafredo	+ 32"
5	Marco Brenner (GER)	Team DSM	+ 36"
6	Lorenzo Milesi (ITA)	Team DSM	+ 49"
7	Axel Laurance (FRA)	Alpecin–Deceuninck	+ 1' 06"
8	Johannes Staune-Mittet (NOR)	Team Jumbo–Visma	+ 1' 15"
9	Tobias Lund Andresen (DEN)	Team DSM	+ 1' 31"
10	Madis Mihkels (EST)	Intermarché–Circus–Wanty	+ 1' 39"

=== Team classification ===
Final team classification (1–10)
Rank	Team	Time
1	(United States) EF Education–EasyPost	29h 34' 30"
2	(Norway) Uno-X Pro Cycling Team	+ 4"
3	(United Kingdom) Ineos Grenadiers	+ 8"
4	(Netherlands) Team DSM	+ 12"
5	(Netherlands) Team Jumbo–Visma	+ 20"
6	(United States) Trek–Segafredo	+ 1' 01"
7	(Germany) Bora–Hansgrohe	+ 1' 07"
8	(Belgium) Intermarché–Circus–Wanty	+ 1' 14"
9	(Belgium) Alpecin–Deceuninck	+ 1' 33"
10	(Switzerland) Q36.5 Pro Cycling Team	+ 1' 54"
