= 2025 AlUla Tour =

Saudi Arabian cycling race

2025 UCI Asia Tour, race 4 of 19

Race details
- Dates: 28 January – 1 February 2025
- Stages: 5
- Distance: 764.4 km (475.0 mi)
- Winning time: 17h 26' 25"

Results
| Jersey awarded to the overall winner | Winner | Tom Pidcock (GBR) | (Q36.5 Pro Cycling Team) |
| | Second | Fredrik Dversnes (NOR) | (Uno-X Mobility) |
| | Third | Johannes Kulset (NOR) | (Uno-X Mobility) |
| Jersey awarded to the points classification winner | Points | Tom Pidcock (GBR) | (Q36.5 Pro Cycling Team) |
| Jersey awarded to the youth classification winner | Youth | Johannes Kulset (NOR) | (Uno-X Mobility) |
| Jersey awarded to the sprints classification winner | Sprints | Jens Reynders (BEL) | (Wagner Bazin WB) |
| | Team | (Norway) Uno-X Mobility | |

The 2025 AlUla Tour was a road cycling stage race that took place between 28 January and 1 February 2025 in Saudi Arabia. The race was rated as a category 2.1 event on the 2025 UCI Asia Tour calendar and is the ninth edition of the Saudi Tour.

== Teams ==
Seventeen teams entered the race, including six UCI WorldTeams, seven UCI ProTeams, three UCI Continental teams and the Saudi Arabian National Team. All teams entered a full squad of seven riders, with the exception of Tudor Pro Cycling Team, who entered six. In total, 118 riders started the race. 106 riders finished all five stages.

UCI WorldTeams

- Soudal–Quick-Step
- Team Bahrain Victorious
- UAE Team Emirates XRG
- Team Jayco–AlUla
- Team Picnic PostNL
- XDS Astana Team

UCI ProTeams

- Caja Rural–Seguros RGA
- Equipo Kern Pharma
- Q36.5 Pro Cycling Team
- Team TotalEnergies
- Tudor Pro Cycling Team
- Uno-X Mobility
- Wagner Bazin WB

UCI Continental Teams

- JCL Team Ukyo
- Roojai Insurance
- Terengganu Cycling Team

National team

- Saudi Arabia

== Route ==
Stage characteristics and winners
| Stage | Date | Course | Distance | Type | Stage winner |
|---|---|---|---|---|---|
| 1 | 28 January | Al Manshiyah Train Station to Al Manshiyah Train Station | 142.7 km (88.7 mi) | Flat stage | Tim Merlier (BEL) |
| 2 | 29 January | AlUla Old Town to Bir Jaydah Mountain Wirkah | 157.7 km (98.0 mi) | Hilly stage | Tom Pidcock (GBR) |
| 3 | 30 January | Hegra to Tayma Fort | 180.6 km (112.2 mi) | Flat stage | Tim Merlier (BEL) |
| 4 | 31 January | Maraya to Skyviews of Harrat Uwayrid | 140.9 km (87.6 mi) | Hilly stage | Tom Pidcock (GBR) |
| 5 | 1 February | AlUla Camel Cup Track to AlUla Camel Cup Track | 169.6 km (105.4 mi) | Flat stage | Matteo Moschetti (ITA) |

== Stages ==
=== Stage 1 ===
28 January 2025 — Al Manshiyah Train Station to Al Manshiyah Train Station, 142.7 km (88.7 mi)

Stage 1 Result (1–10)
| Rank | Rider | Team | Time |
|---|---|---|---|
| 1 | Tim Merlier (BEL) | Soudal–Quick-Step | 3h 10' 21" |
| 2 | Sebastian Molano (COL) | UAE Team Emirates XRG | + 0" |
| 3 | Maikel Zijlaard (NED) | Tudor Pro Cycling Team | + 0" |
| 4 | Matteo Moschetti (ITA) | Q36.5 Pro Cycling Team | + 0" |
| 5 | Dylan Groenewegen (NED) | Team Jayco–AlUla | + 0" |
| 6 | Max Walscheid (GER) | Team Jayco–AlUla | + 0" |
| 7 | Pierre Barbier (FRA) | Wagner Bazin WB | + 0" |
| 8 | Alberto Bruttomesso (ITA) | Team Bahrain Victorious | + 0" |
| 9 | Sasha Weemaes (BEL) | Wagner Bazin WB | + 0" |
| 10 | Andrea D'Amato (ITA) | JCL Team Ukyo | + 0" |

General classification after Stage 1 (1–10)
| Rank | Rider | Team | Time |
|---|---|---|---|
| 1 | Tim Merlier (BEL) | Soudal–Quick-Step | 3h 10' 11" |
| 2 | Sebastian Molano (COL) | UAE Team Emirates XRG | + 4" |
| 3 | Maikel Zijlaard (NED) | Tudor Pro Cycling Team | + 6" |
| 4 | Fredrik Dversnes (NOR) | Uno-X Mobility | + 7" |
| 5 | Jens Reynders (BEL) | Wagner Bazin WB | + 8" |
| 6 | Frank van den Broek (NED) | Team Picnic PostNL | + 9" |
| 7 | Matteo Moschetti (ITA) | Q36.5 Pro Cycling Team | + 10" |
| 8 | Dylan Groenewegen (NED) | Team Jayco–AlUla | + 10" |
| 9 | Max Walscheid (GER) | Team Jayco–AlUla | + 10" |
| 10 | Pierre Barbier (FRA) | Wagner Bazin WB | + 10" |

=== Stage 2 ===
29 January 2025 — AlUla Old Town to Bir Jaydah Mountain Wirkah, 157.7 km (98.0 mi)

Stage 2 Result (1–10)
| Rank | Rider | Team | Time |
|---|---|---|---|
| 1 | Tom Pidcock (GBR) | Q36.5 Pro Cycling Team | 3h 18' 15" |
| 2 | Rainer Kepplinger (AUT) | Soudal–Quick-Step | + 4" |
| 3 | Alan Hatherly (RSA) | Team Jayco–AlUla | + 7" |
| 4 | Edward Dunbar (IRL) | Team Jayco–AlUla | + 18" |
| 5 | Stefan de Bod (RSA) | Terengganu Cycling Team | + 21" |
| 6 | Fredrik Dversnes (NOR) | Uno-X Mobility | + 27" |
| 7 | Yannis Voisard (SUI) | Tudor Pro Cycling Team | + 27" |
| 8 | Rafal Majka (POL) | UAE Team Emirates XRG | + 27" |
| 9 | Hugo Aznar (ESP) | Equipo Kern Pharma | + 30" |
| 10 | Alessandro Fancellu (ITA) | JCL Team Ukyo | + 34" |

General classification after Stage 2 (1–10)
| Rank | Rider | Team | Time |
|---|---|---|---|
| 1 | Tom Pidcock (GBR) | Q36.5 Pro Cycling Team | 6h 28' 26" |
| 2 | Rainer Kepplinger (AUT) | Team Bahrain Victorious | + 8" |
| 3 | Alan Hatherly (RSA) | Team Jayco–AlUla | + 13" |
| 4 | Edward Dunbar (IRL) | Team Jayco–AlUla | + 28" |
| 5 | Stefan de Bod (RSA) | Terengganu Cycling Team | + 31" |
| 6 | Fredrik Dversnes (NOR) | Uno-X Mobility | + 34" |
| 7 | Yannis Voisard (SUI) | Tudor Pro Cycling Team | + 37" |
| 8 | Adne Holter (NOR) | Uno-X Mobility | + 44" |
| 9 | Frank van den Broek (NED) | Team Picnic PostNL | + 48" |
| 10 | Unai Iribar (ESP) | Equipo Kern Pharma | + 50" |

=== Stage 3 ===
30 January 2025 — Hegra to Tayma Fort, 180.6 km (112.2 mi)

Stage 3 Result (1–10)
| Rank | Rider | Team | Time |
|---|---|---|---|
| 1 | Tim Merlier (BEL) | Soudal–Quick-Step | 4h 16' 23" |
| 2 | Dylan Groenewegen (NED) | Team Jayco–AlUla | + 0" |
| 3 | Sebastian Molano (COL) | UAE Team Emirates XRG | + 0" |
| 4 | Matteo Moschetti (ITA) | Q36.5 Pro Cycling Team | + 0" |
| 5 | Pierre Barbier (FRA) | Wagner Bazin WB | + 0" |
| 6 | Marc Brustenga (ESP) | Equipo Kern Pharma | + 0" |
| 7 | Yevgeniy Fedorov (KAZ) | XDS Astana Team | + 0" |
| 8 | Florian Dauphin (FRA) | Team TotalEnergies | + 0" |
| 9 | Alberto Bruttomesso (ITA) | Team Bahrain Victorious | + 0" |
| 10 | Sebastian Kolze Changizi (DEN) | Tudor Pro Cycling Team | + 0" |

General classification after Stage 3 (1–10)
| Rank | Rider | Team | Time |
|---|---|---|---|
| 1 | Tom Pidcock (GBR) | Q36.5 Pro Cycling Team | 10h 44' 49" |
| 2 | Rainer Kepplinger (AUT) | Team Bahrain Victorious | + 8" |
| 3 | Alan Hatherly (RSA) | Team Jayco–AlUla | + 13" |
| 4 | Fredrik Dversnes (NOR) | Uno-X Mobility | + 34" |
| 5 | Yannis Voisard (SUI) | Tudor Pro Cycling Team | + 37" |
| 6 | Adne Holter (NOR) | Uno-X Mobility | + 44" |
| 7 | Frank van den Broek (NED) | Team Picnic PostNL | + 48" |
| 8 | Calum Johnston (GBR) | Caja Rural–Seguros RGA | + 50" |
| 9 | Max van der Meulen (NED) | Team Bahrain Victorious | + 50" |
| 10 | Johannes Kulset (NOR) | Uno-X Mobility | + 50" |

=== Stage 4 ===
31 January 2025 — Maraya to Skyviews of Harrat Uwayrid, 140.9 km (87.6 mi)

Stage 4 Result (1–10)
| Rank | Rider | Team | Time |
|---|---|---|---|
| 1 | Tom Pidcock (GBR) | Q36.5 Pro Cycling Team | 3h 9' 46" |
| 2 | Alan Hatherly (RSA) | Team Jayco–AlUla | + 12" |
| 3 | Rainer Kepplinger (AUT) | Team Bahrain Victorious | + 12" |
| 4 | Johannes Kulset (NOR) | Uno-X Mobility | + 12" |
| 5 | Edward Dunbar (IRL) | Team Jayco–AlUla | + 16" |
| 6 | Thomas Pesenti (ITA) | Soudal–Quick-Step | + 24" |
| 7 | Xabier Azparren (ESP) | Q36.5 Pro Cycling Team | + 24" |
| 8 | Alessandro Fancellu (ITA) | JCL Team Ukyo | + 24" |
| 9 | Joris Delbove (FRA) | Team TotalEnergies | + 24" |
| 10 | Max van der Meulen (NED) | Team Bahrain Victorious | + 24" |

General classification after Stage 4 (1–10)
| Rank | Rider | Team | Time |
|---|---|---|---|
| 1 | Tom Pidcock (GBR) | Q36.5 Pro Cycling Team | 13h 54' 22" |
| 2 | Rainer Kepplinger (AUT) | Team Bahrain Victorious | + 29" |
| 3 | Alan Hatherly (RSA) | Team Jayco–AlUla | + 32" |
| 4 | Fredrik Dversnes (NOR) | Uno-X Mobility | + 1' 11" |
| 5 | Johannes Kulset (NOR) | Uno-X Mobility | + 1' 13" |
| 6 | Yannis Voisard (SUI) | Tudor Pro Cycling Team | + 1' 14" |
| 7 | Adne Holter (NOR) | Uno-X Mobility | + 1' 21" |
| 8 | Frank van den Broek (NED) | Team Picnic PostNL | + 1' 25" |
| 9 | Max van der Meulen (NED) | Team Bahrain Victorious | + 1' 27" |
| 10 | Alessandro Fancellu (ITA) | JCL Team Ukyo | + 1' 38" |

=== Stage 5 ===
1 February 2025 — AlUla Camel Cup Track to AlUla Camel Cup Track, 169.6 km (105.4 mi)

Stage 5 Result (1–10)
| Rank | Rider | Team | Time |
|---|---|---|---|
| 1 | Matteo Moschetti (ITA) | Q36.5 Pro Cycling Team | 3h 32' 00" |
| 2 | Dylan Groenewegen (NED) | Team Jayco–AlUla | + 0" |
| 3 | Sebastian Molano (COL) | UAE Team Emirates XRG | + 0" |
| 4 | Alexander Kristoff (NOR) | Uno-X Mobility | + 0" |
| 5 | Yevgeniy Fedorov (KAZ) | XDS Astana Team | + 0" |
| 6 | Florian Dauphin (FRA) | Team TotalEnergies | + 0" |
| 7 | Arvid de Kleijn (NED) | Tudor Pro Cycling Team | + 0" |
| 8 | Alberto Bruttomesso (ITA) | Team Bahrain Victorious | + 0" |
| 9 | Sasha Weemaes (BEL) | Wagner Bazin WB | + 0" |
| 10 | Marc Brustenga (ESP) | Equipo Kern Pharma | + 0" |

General classification after Stage 5 (1–10)
| Rank | Rider | Team | Time |
|---|---|---|---|
| 1 | Tom Pidcock (GBR) | Q36.5 Pro Cycling Team | 17h 26' 25" |
| 2 | Fredrik Dversnes (NOR) | Uno-X Mobility | + 1' 09" |
| 3 | Johannes Kulset (NOR) | Uno-X Mobility | + 1' 12" |
| 4 | Adne Holter (NOR) | Uno-X Mobility | + 1' 22" |
| 5 | Rainer Kepplinger (AUT) | Team Bahrain Victorious | + 1' 23" |
| 6 | Alan Hatherly (RSA) | Team Jayco–AlUla | + 1' 26" |
| 7 | Frank van den Broek (NED) | Team Picnic PostNL | + 1' 26" |
| 8 | Alessandro Fancellu (ITA) | JCL Team Ukyo | + 1' 39" |
| 9 | Diego Uriarte (ESP) | Equipo Kern Pharma | + 1' 51" |
| 10 | Jordan Jegat (FRA) | Team TotalEnergies | + 1' 58" |

== Classification leadership table ==
Classification leadership by stage
| Stage | Winner | General classification | Points classification | Active rider classification | Young rider classification | Team classification |
|---|---|---|---|---|---|---|
| 1 | Tim Merlier | Tim Merlier | Tim Merlier | Nur Aiman Rosli | Frank van den Broek | Team Jayco–AlUla |
| 2 | Tom Pidcock | Tom Pidcock | Tom Pidcock | Nur Aiman Rosli | Adne Holter | Uno-X Mobility |
| 3 | Tim Merlier | Tom Pidcock | Tim Merlier | Jens Reynders | Adne Holter | Uno-X Mobility |
| 4 | Tom Pidcock | Tom Pidcock | Tom Pidcock | Jens Reynders | Johannes Kulset | Uno-X Mobility |
| 5 | Matteo Moschetti' | Tom Pidcock | Tom Pidcock | Jens Reynders | Johannes Kulset | Uno-X Mobility |
| Final | | Tom Pidcock | Tom Pidcock | Jens Reynders | Johannes Kulset | Uno-X Mobility |

== Classification standings ==
Legend
| Denotes the winner of the general classification | Denotes the winner of the points classification |
| Denotes the winner of the active rider classification | Denotes the winner of the young rider classification |

=== General classification ===
Final general classification (1–10)
| Rank | Rider | Team | Time |
|---|---|---|---|
| 1 | Tom Pidcock (GBR) | Q36.5 Pro Cycling Team | 17h 26' 25" |
| 2 | Fredrik Dversnes (NOR) | Uno-X Mobility | + 1' 09" |
| 3 | Johannes Kulset (NOR) | Uno-X Mobility | + 1' 12" |
| 4 | Adne Holter (NOR) | Uno-X Mobility | + 1' 22" |
| 5 | Rainer Kepplinger (AUT) | Team Bahrain Victorious | + 1' 23" |
| 6 | Alan Hatherly (RSA) | Team Jayco–AlUla | + 1' 26" |
| 7 | Frank van den Broek (NED) | Team Picnic PostNL | + 1' 26" |
| 8 | Alessandro Fancellu (ITA) | JCL Team Ukyo | + 1' 39" |
| 9 | Diego Uriarte (ESP) | Equipo Kern Pharma | + 1' 51" |
| 10 | Jordan Jegat (FRA) | Team TotalEnergies | + 1' 58" |

=== Points classification ===
Final points classification (1–10)
| Rank | Rider | Team | Points |
|---|---|---|---|
| 1 | Tom Pidcock (GBR) | Q36.5 Pro Cycling Team | 30 |
| 2 | Tim Merlier (BEL) | Soudal–Quick-Step | 30 |
| 3 | Sebastian Molano (COL) | UAE Team Emirates XRG | 30 |
| 4 | Dylan Groenewegen (NED) | Team Jayco–AlUla | 30 |
| 5 | Matteo Moschetti (ITA) | Q36.5 Pro Cycling Team | 29 |
| 6 | Rainer Kepplinger (AUT) | Team Bahrain Victorious | 21 |
| 7 | Alan Hatherly (RSA) | Team Jayco–AlUla | 21 |
| 8 | Edward Dunbar (IRL) | Team Jayco–AlUla | 13 |
| 9 | Yevgeniy Fedorov (KAZ) | XDS Astana Team | 10 |
| 10 | Pierre Barbier (FRA) | Wagner Bazin WB | 10 |

=== Active rider classification ===
Final active rider classification (1–10)
| Rank | Rider | Team | Points |
|---|---|---|---|
| 1 | Jens Reynders (BEL) | Wagner Bazin WB | 21 |
| 2 | Nur Aiman Rosli (MAS) | Terengganu Cycling Team | 8 |
| 3 | Fredrik Dversnes (NOR) | Uno-X Mobility | 6 |
| 4 | Tom Pidcock (GBR) | Q36.5 Pro Cycling Team | 4 |
| 5 | Johannes Kulset (NOR) | Uno-X Mobility | 4 |
| 6 | Shahmir Aiman (MAS) | Terengganu Cycling Team | 4 |
| 7 | Kane Richards (AUS) | Roojai Insurance | 4 |
| 8 | Aivaras Mikutis (LTU) | Tudor Pro Cycling Team | 3 |
| 9 | Emils Liepins (LAT) | Q36.5 Pro Cycling Team | 3 |
| 10 | Jonas Abrahamsen (NOR) | Uno-X Mobility | 3 |

=== Young rider classification ===
Final young rider classification (1–10)
| Rank | Rider | Team | Time |
|---|---|---|---|
| 1 | Johannes Kulset (NOR) | Uno-X Mobility | 17h 27' 37" |
| 2 | Adne Holter (NOR) | Uno-X Mobility | + 10" |
| 3 | Frank van den Broek (NED) | Team Picnic PostNL | + 14" |
| 4 | Alessandro Fancellu (ITA) | JCL Team Ukyo | + 27" |
| 5 | Diego Uriarte (ESP) | Equipo Kern Pharma | + 39" |
| 6 | Max van der Meulen (NED) | Team Bahrain Victorious | + 1' 09" |
| 7 | Yevgeniy Fedorov (KAZ) | XDS Astana Team | + 1' 13" |
| 8 | Nicolas Vinokurov (KAZ) | XDS Astana Team | + 1' 59" |
| 9 | Nicolo Buratti (ITA) | Team Bahrain Victorious | + 2' 20" |
| 10 | Hugo Aznar (ESP) | Equipo Kern Pharma | + 2' 38" |

=== Teams classification ===
Final team classification (1–10)
| Rank | Team | Time |
|---|---|---|
| 1 | (Norway) Uno-X Mobility | 52h 23' 04" |
| 2 | Team Bahrain Victorious | + 2' 26" |
| 3 | (Spain) Equipo Kern Pharma | + 2' 26" |
| 4 | (United Arab Emirates) UAE Team Emirates XRG | + 2' 27" |
| 5 | (France) Team TotalEnergies | + 4' 05" |
| 6 | (Kazakhstan) XDS Astana Team | + 4' 16" |
| 7 | (Switzerland) Q36.5 Pro Cycling Team | + 5' 27" |
| 8 | (Australia) Team Jayco–AlUla | + 5' 50" |
| 9 | (Spain) Caja Rural–Seguros RGA | + 7' 14" |
| 10 | (Belgium) Wagner Bazin WB | + 8' 24" |
