= 2025 Tour of Norway =

Norwegian cycling race

2025 UCI ProSeries

Race details
- Dates: 29 May – 1 June 2025
- Stages: 4
- Distance: 658.9 km (409.4 mi)
- Winning time: 15h 32' 22"

Results
Jersey awarded to the overall winner	Winner	Matthew Brennan (GBR)	(Visma–Lease a Bike)
	Second	Victor Langellotti (MON)	(Ineos Grenadiers)
	Third	Jan Christen (SUI)	(UAE Team Emirates XRG)
Jersey awarded to the points classification winner	Points	Matthew Brennan (GBR)	(Visma–Lease a Bike)
Jersey awarded to the mountains classification winner	Mountains	Emil Toudal (DEN)	(Team ColoQuick)
Jersey awarded to the youth classification winner	Youth	Matthew Brennan (GBR)	(Visma–Lease a Bike)
	Team	(Netherlands) Visma–Lease a Bike	

The 2025 Tour of Norway was a road cycling stage race that took place between 29 May and 1 June 2025 in Norway. The race was rated as a category 2.Pro event on the 2025 UCI ProSeries calendar, and was the 14th edition of the Tour of Norway.

== Teams ==
Seven UCI WorldTeams, five UCI ProTeams, four UCI Continental teams, and the Norwegian national team made up the 17 teams that participated in the race.

UCI WorldTeams

- Alpecin–Deceuninck
- Ineos Grenadiers
- Intermarché–Wanty
- Red Bull–Bora–Hansgrohe
- Team Picnic–PostNL
- UAE Team Emirates XRG
- Visma–Lease a Bike

UCI ProTeams

- Israel–Premier Tech
- Lotto
- Team Flanders–Baloise
- Unibet Tietema Rockets
- Uno-X Mobility

UCI Continental Teams

- Lillehammer CK Continental Team
- Project Echelon Racing
- Team ColoQuick
- Team Coop–Repsol

National Teams

- Norway

== Route ==
Stage characteristics and winners
Stage	Date	Course	Distance	Type	Stage winner
1	29 May	Solakrossen to Solakrossen	179.2 km (111.3 mi)	Flat stage	Storm Ingebrigtsen (NOR)
2	30 May	Egersund to Oltedal	208.1 km (129.3 mi)	Intermediate stage	Matthew Brennan (GBR)
3	31 May	Jørpeland to Heja	141.6 km (88.0 mi)	Intermediate stage	Maxim Van Gils (BEL)
4	1 June	Stavanger to Stavanger	130 km (81 mi)	Hilly stage	Matthew Brennan (GBR)
Total			658.9 km (409.4 mi)		

== Stages ==
=== Stage 1 ===
29 May 2025 – Vossavangen to Voss Resort, 142 km (88 mi)

Stage 1 Result
Rank	Rider	Team	Time
1	Storm Ingebrigtsen (NOR)	Team Coop–Repsol	4h 06' 57"
2	Matthew Brennan (GBR)	Visma–Lease a Bike	+ 3"
3	Tibor Del Grosso (NED)	Alpecin–Deceuninck	+ 3"
4	Juan Sebastián Molano (COL)	UAE Team Emirates XRG	+ 3"
5	Alexander Kristoff (NOR)	Uno-X Mobility	+ 3"
6	Tobias Lund Andresen (DEN)	Team Picnic–PostNL	+ 3"
7	Karsten Larsen Feldmann (NOR)	Team Coop–Repsol	+ 3"
8	Fredrik Dversnes (NOR)	Uno-X Mobility	+ 3"
9	Tom Van Asbroeck (BEL)	Israel–Premier Tech	+ 3"
10	Mikkel Bjerg (DEN)	UAE Team Emirates XRG	+ 3"

General classification after Stage 1
Rank	Rider	Team	Time
1	Storm Ingebrigtsen (NOR)	Team Coop–Repsol	4h 06' 43"
2	Matthew Brennan (GBR)	Visma–Lease a Bike	+ 11"
3	Tibor Del Grosso (NED)	Alpecin–Deceuninck	+ 13"
4	Juan Sebastián Molano (COL)	UAE Team Emirates XRG	+ 17"
5	Alexander Kristoff (NOR)	Uno-X Mobility	+ 17"
6	Tobias Lund Andresen (DEN)	Team Picnic–PostNL	+ 17"
7	Karsten Larsen Feldmann (NOR)	Team Coop–Repsol	+ 17"
8	Fredrik Dversnes (NOR)	Uno-X Mobility	+ 17"
9	Tom Van Asbroeck (BEL)	Israel–Premier Tech	+ 17"
10	Mikkel Bjerg (DEN)	UAE Team Emirates XRG	+ 17"

=== Stage 2 ===
30 May 2025 – Odda to Gullingen, 205 km (127 mi)

Stage 2 Result
Rank	Rider	Team	Time
1	Matthew Brennan (GBR)	Visma–Lease a Bike	5h 09' 12"
2	Maxim Van Gils (BEL)	Red Bull–Bora–Hansgrohe	+ 0"
3	Victor Langellotti (MON)	Ineos Grenadiers	+ 0"
4	Tobias Lund Andresen (DEN)	Team Picnic–PostNL	+ 3"
5	Jan Christen (SUI)	UAE Team Emirates XRG	+ 3"
6	Jonas Geens (BEL)	Team Flanders–Baloise	+ 3"
7	Tibor Del Grosso (NED)	Alpecin–Deceuninck	+ 3"
8	Bjoern Koerdt (GBR)	Team Picnic–PostNL	+ 5"
9	Ludvik Holstad (NOR)	Lillehammer CK Continental Team	+ 5"
10	Ådne Holter (NOR)	Uno-X Mobility	+ 5"

General classification after Stage 2
Rank	Rider	Team	Time
1	Matthew Brennan (GBR)	Visma–Lease a Bike	9h 15' 56"
2	Victor Langellotti (MON)	Ineos Grenadiers	+ 12"
3	Tibor Del Grosso (NED)	Alpecin–Deceuninck	+ 15"
4	Storm Ingebrigtsen (NOR)	Team Coop–Repsol	+ 16"
5	Tobias Lund Andresen (DEN)	Team Picnic–PostNL	+ 19"
6	Jan Christen (SUI)	UAE Team Emirates XRG	+ 19"
7	Jonas Geens (BEL)	Team Flanders–Baloise	+ 19"
8	Ådne Holter (NOR)	Uno-X Mobility	+ 21"
9	Fredrik Dversnes (NOR)	Uno-X Mobility	+ 21"
10	Bjoern Koerdt (GBR)	Team Picnic–PostNL	+ 21"

=== Stage 3 ===
31 May 2025 – Sola to Egersund, 173 km (107 mi)

Stage 3 Result
Rank	Rider	Team	Time
1	Maxim Van Gils (BEL)	Red Bull–Bora–Hansgrohe	3h 23' 17"
2	Matthew Brennan (GBR)	Visma–Lease a Bike	+ 0"
3	Victor Langellotti (MON)	Ineos Grenadiers	+ 0"
4	Jan Christen (SUI)	UAE Team Emirates XRG	+ 0"
5	Huub Artz (NED)	Intermarché–Wanty	+ 3"
6	Gal Glivar (SLO)	Alpecin–Deceuninck	+ 3"
7	Ådne Holter (NOR)	Uno-X Mobility	+ 5"
8	Jørgen Nordhagen (NOR)	Visma–Lease a Bike	+ 5"
9	Odd Christian Eiking (NOR)	Unibet Tietema Rockets	+ 5"
10	Tibor Del Grosso (NED)	Alpecin–Deceuninck	+ 8"

General classification after Stage 3
Rank	Rider	Team	Time
1	Matthew Brennan (GBR)	Visma–Lease a Bike	12h 39' 03"
2	Victor Langellotti (MON)	Ineos Grenadiers	+ 18"
3	Jan Christen (SUI)	UAE Team Emirates XRG	+ 29"
4	Tibor Del Grosso (NED)	Alpecin–Deceuninck	+ 33"
5	Huub Artz (NED)	Intermarché–Wanty	+ 34"
6	Ådne Holter (NOR)	Uno-X Mobility	+ 36"
7	Tobias Lund Andresen (DEN)	Team Picnic–PostNL	+ 37"
8	Jonas Geens (BEL)	Team Flanders–Baloise	+ 45"
9	Fredrik Dversnes (NOR)	Uno-X Mobility	+ 50"
10	Vincent Van Hemelen (BEL)	Team Flanders–Baloise	+ 50"

=== Stage 4 ===
1 June 2025 – Stavanger to Stavanger, 125 km (78 mi)

Stage 4 Result
Rank	Rider	Team	Time
1	Matthew Brennan (GBR)	Visma–Lease a Bike	2h 53' 29"
2	Alexander Kristoff (NOR)	Uno-X Mobility	+ 0"
3	Tobias Lund Andresen (DEN)	Team Picnic–PostNL	+ 0"
4	Ethan Vernon (GBR)	Israel–Premier Tech	+ 0"
5	Tibor Del Grosso (NED)	Alpecin–Deceuninck	+ 0"
6	Rasmus Tiller (NOR)	Uno-X Mobility	+ 0"
7	Huub Artz (NED)	Intermarché–Wanty	+ 0"
8	Tim van Dijke (NED)	Red Bull–Bora–Hansgrohe	+ 0"
9	Karsten Larsen Feldmann (NOR)	Team Coop–Repsol	+ 0"
10	Stan Van Tricht (BEL)	Alpecin–Deceuninck	+ 0"

General classification after Stage 4
Rank	Rider	Team	Time
1	Matthew Brennan (GBR)	Visma–Lease a Bike	15h 32' 22"
2	Victor Langellotti (MON)	Ineos Grenadiers	+ 28"
3	Jan Christen (SUI)	UAE Team Emirates XRG	+ 39"
4	Tobias Lund Andresen (DEN)	Team Picnic–PostNL	+ 43"
5	Tibor Del Grosso (NED)	Alpecin–Deceuninck	+ 43"
6	Huub Artz (NED)	Intermarché–Wanty	+ 44"
7	Ådne Holter (NOR)	Uno-X Mobility	+ 46"
8	Jonas Geens (BEL)	Team Flanders–Baloise	+ 55"
9	Fredrik Dversnes (NOR)	Uno-X Mobility	+ 1' 00"
10	Vincent Van Hemelen (BEL)	Team Flanders–Baloise	+ 1' 00"

== Classification leadership table ==
Classification leadership by stage
Stage	Winner	General classification	Points classification	Mountains classification	Young rider classification	Team classification
1	Storm Ingebrigtsen	Storm Ingebrigtsen	Storm Ingebrigtsen	Storm Ingebrigtsen	Storm Ingebrigtsen	Team Coop–Repsol
2	Matthew Brennan	Matthew Brennan	Matthew Brennan	Emil Toudal	Matthew Brennan	Visma–Lease a Bike
3	Maxim Van Gils	Matthew Brennan	Matthew Brennan	Joshua Gudnitz	Matthew Brennan	Visma–Lease a Bike
4	Matthew Brennan	Matthew Brennan	Matthew Brennan	Emil Toudal	Matthew Brennan	Visma–Lease a Bike
Final		Matthew Brennan	Matthew Brennan	Emil Toudal	Matthew Brennan	Visma–Lease a Bike

== Classification standings ==
Legend
Denotes the winner of the general classification	Denotes the winner of the mountains classification
Denotes the winner of the points classification	Denotes the winner of the young rider classification

=== General classification ===
Final general classification (1–10)
Rank	Rider	Team	Time
1	Matthew Brennan (GBR)	Visma–Lease a Bike	15h 32' 22"
2	Victor Langellotti (MON)	Ineos Grenadiers	+ 28"
3	Jan Christen (SUI)	UAE Team Emirates XRG	+ 39"
4	Tobias Lund Andresen (DEN)	Team Picnic–PostNL	+ 43"
5	Tibor Del Grosso (NED)	Alpecin–Deceuninck	+ 43"
6	Huub Artz (NED)	Intermarché–Wanty	+ 44"
7	Ådne Holter (NOR)	Uno-X Mobility	+ 46"
8	Jonas Geens (BEL)	Team Flanders–Baloise	+ 55"
9	Fredrik Dversnes (NOR)	Uno-X Mobility	+ 1' 00"
10	Vincent Van Hemelen (BEL)	Team Flanders–Baloise	+ 1' 00"

=== Points classification ===
Final points classification (1–10)
Rank	Rider	Team	Points
1	Matthew Brennan (GBR)	Visma–Lease a Bike	84
2	Tobias Lund Andresen (DEN)	Team Picnic–PostNL	51
3	Tibor Del Grosso (NED)	Alpecin–Deceuninck	51
4	Alexander Kristoff (NOR)	Uno-X Mobility	38
5	Storm Ingebrigtsen (NOR)	Team Coop–Repsol	33
6	Wessel Mouris (NED)	Unibet Tietema Rockets	30
7	Maxim Van Gils (BEL)	Red Bull–Bora–Hansgrohe	29
8	Huub Artz (NED)	Intermarché–Wanty	27
9	Victor Langellotti (MON)	Ineos Grenadiers	26
10	Jan Christen (SUI)	UAE Team Emirates XRG	25

=== Mountains classification ===
Final mountains classification (1–10)
Rank	Rider	Team	Points
1	Emil Toudal (DEN)	Team ColoQuick	35
2	Joshua Gudnitz (DEN)	Team ColoQuick	21
3	Brage Aulstad (NOR)	Lillehammer CK Continental Team	12
4	Kasper Haugland (NOR)	Norway	12
5	Storm Ingebrigtsen (NOR)	Team Coop–Repsol	10
6	Wessel Mouris (NED)	Unibet Tietema Rockets	9
7	Mikkel Bjerg (DEN)	UAE Team Emirates XRG	9
8	Eirik Vang Aas (NOR)	Team Coop–Repsol	9
9	Jan Christen (SUI)	UAE Team Emirates XRG	8
10	Jelle Johannink (NED)	Unibet Tietema Rockets	8

=== Young rider classification ===
Final young rider classification (1–10)
Rank	Rider	Team	Time
1	Matthew Brennan (GBR)	Visma–Lease a Bike	15h 32' 22"
2	Jan Christen (SUI)	UAE Team Emirates XRG	+ 39"
3	Tibor Del Grosso (NED)	Alpecin–Deceuninck	+ 43"
4	Bjoern Koerdt (GBR)	Team Picnic–PostNL	+ 1' 12"
5	Jørgen Nordhagen (NOR)	Visma–Lease a Bike	+ 1' 20"
6	Storm Ingebrigtsen (NOR)	Team Coop–Repsol	+ 2' 37"
7	Malte Hellerup (DEN)	Team ColoQuick	+ 2' 59"
8	Per Strand Hagenes (NOR)	Visma–Lease a Bike	+ 4' 51"
9	Even Thorvaldsen (NOR)	Lillehammer CK Continental Team	+ 5' 31"
10	Marius Innhaug Dahl (NOR)	Norway	+ 7' 47"

=== Team classification ===
Final team classification (1–10)
Rank	Team	Time
1	(Netherlands) Visma–Lease a Bike	46h 40' 02"
2	(Belgium) Team Flanders–Baloise	+ 1' 15"
3	(Netherlands) Team Picnic–PostNL	+ 1' 23"
4	(Norway) Uno-X Mobility	+ 3' 25"
5	(United Arab Emirates) UAE Team Emirates XRG	+ 3' 25"
6	(Belgium) Lotto	+ 3' 53"
7	(France) Unibet Tietema Rockets	+ 5' 15"
8	(Belgium) Intermarché–Wanty	+ 6' 24"
9	(Norway) Lillehammer CK Continental Team	+ 8' 48"
10	(Germany) Red Bull–Bora–Hansgrohe	+ 10' 29"
