= Storm Ingebrigtsen =

Norwegian cyclist (born 2005)

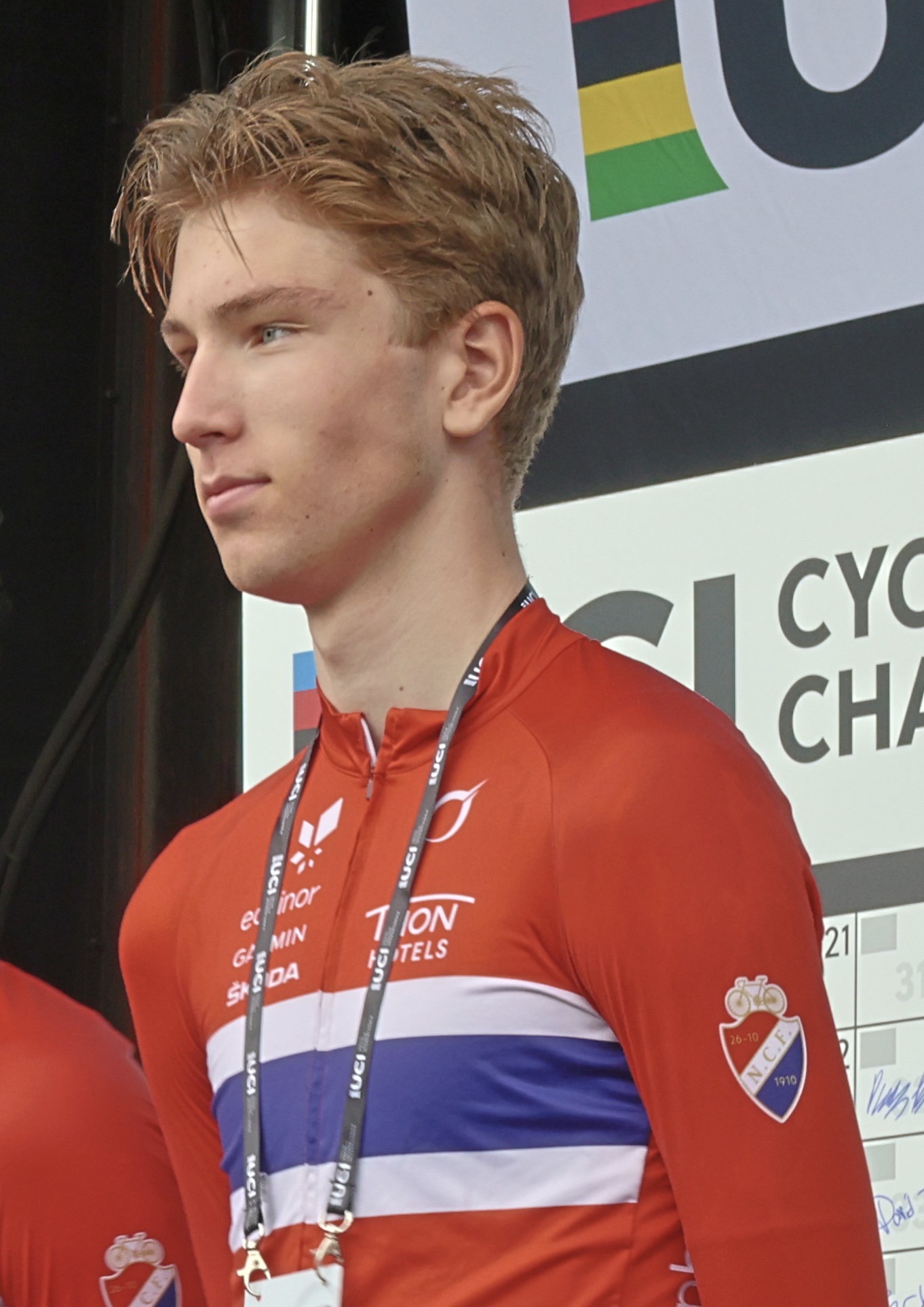
- Ingebrigtsen in 2023

Personal information
- Born: 17 February 2005 (age 21) Fredrikstad, Norway
- Height: 1.94 m (6 ft 4 in)

Cycling career
- Sport: Cycling
- Current team: Uno-X Mobility
- Discipline: Road
- Role: Rider

Amateur team
- 2022–2023: Team NTG/Uno-X

Professional teams
- 2024–2026: Team Coop–Repsol
- 2026-: Uno-X Mobility

Storm Ingebrigtsen (born 17 February 2005) is a Norwegian road cyclist, who rides for the Uno-X Mobility in the WT category.

In 2025, Ingebrigtsen took his first professional win on stage 1 of the Tour of Norway. After riding in a six-man breakaway group, Ingebrigtsen attacked in the final kilometer, winning the stage with a narrow margin of 3 seconds over Matthew Brennan.

== Major results ==
2022
3rd Time trial, National Junior Road Championships
3rd Overall Tour Te Fjells
2023
2nd Overall Tour Te Fjells
2nd Eroica Juniores
2025 (1 pro win)
1st Stage 1 Tour of Norway
1st Mountains classification, Arctic Race of Norway
8th Overall Tour of Rhodes
2026 (1)
1st Stage 4 Danmark Rundt
