= Martin Tjøtta =

Norwegian cyclist

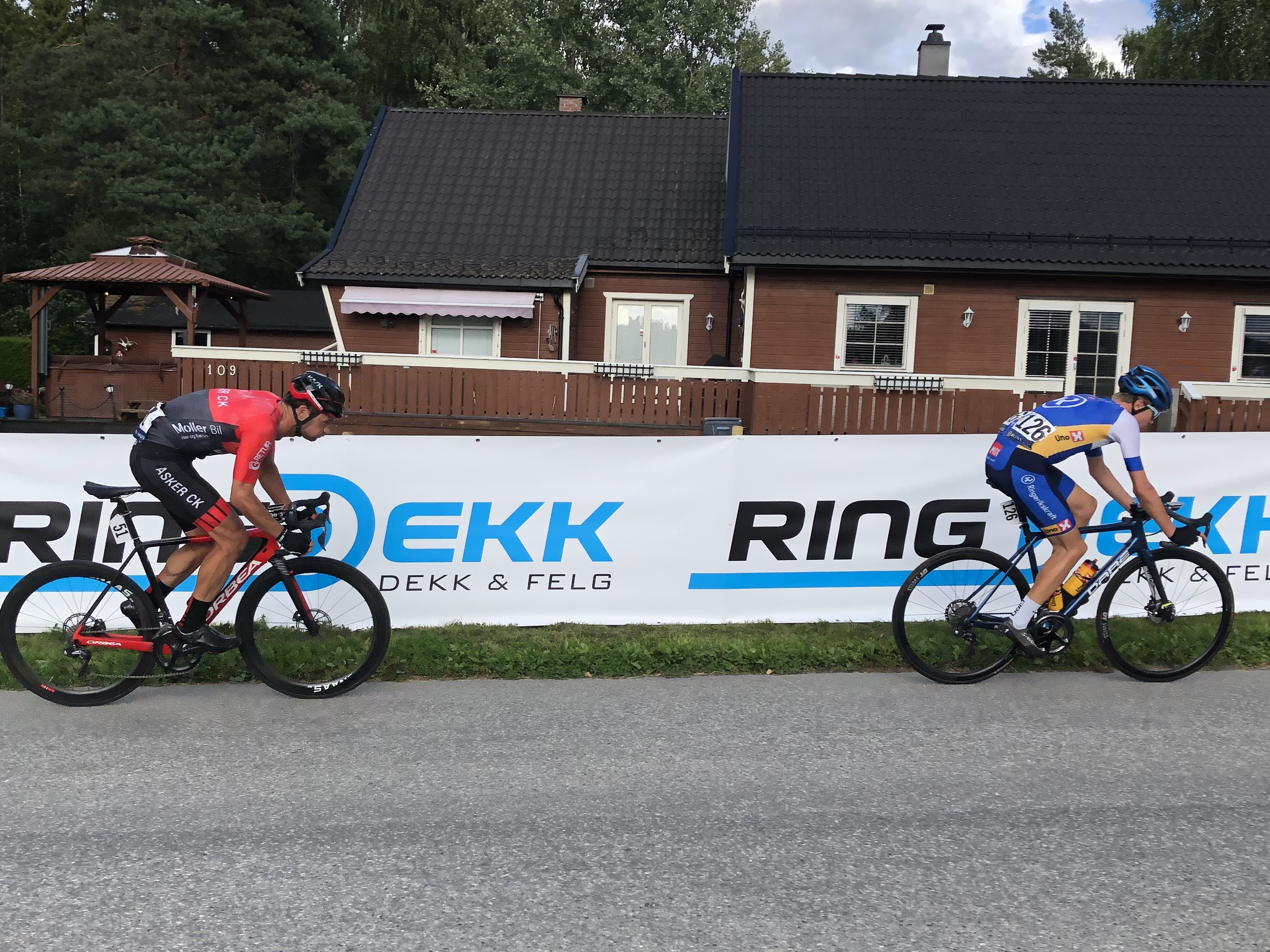
- Tjøtta (right) in 2020

Personal information
- Born: 27 January 2001 (age 25) Oslo, Norway

Cycling career
- Sport: Cycling
- Current team: Uno-X Mobility
- Discipline: Road
- Role: Rider
- Rider type: Climber

Amateur teams
- 2018–2019: Bærum OCK
- 2020: Dare Bikes Development Team
- 2020–2022: Ringerike SK
- 2022–2023: Bourg-en-Bresse Ain Cyclisme

Professional teams
- 2023: Arkéa–Samsic (stagiaire)
- 2024: Arkéa–B&B Hôtels Continentale
- 2025: Arkéa–B&B Hotels
- 2026–: Uno-X Mobility

Martin Tjøtta (born 27 January 2001) is a Norwegian cyclist, who currently rides for UCI WorldTeam Uno-X Mobility.

== Major results ==
2019
4th Overall Giro della Lunigiana
9th GP Luxembourg
2021
6th Lillehammer GP
2022
1st Sundvolden GP
4th Road race, National Road Championships
2023
1st Tour du Gévaudan
1st Stage 3 Giro della Valle d'Aosta
2nd Overall Tour du Pays de Montbéliard

1st Young rider classification

4th Overall Alpes Isère Tour
2025
7th Overall Arctic Race of Norway
7th Overall Tour du Limousin
2026
5th Overall Tour of Guangxi
9th Overall Tour of Oman
