= Norwegian Cyclists' Association =

Norwegian association to promote cycling

The Norwegian Cyclists' Association (Norwegian: Syklistenes Landsforening) is a Norwegian association that works to facilitate that as many people as possible choose bicycles as a means of daily transport. It was founded in 1947 on June 16, and has about 10 000 members. It is a member of the European Cyclists' Federation, and through that the World Cycling Alliance.

They work to improve cyclists' conditions to so that cycling is safe, exciting and attractive. This includes promoting good traffic and cycling culture, lobbying for construction of more bikeways as well as more and safer bicycle parking. In addition to utility cycling, they also promote bicycle touring, appropriate insurances for cyclists, and assist members with advice and information in traffic matters. Yearly they arrange the campaign "visible cyclist" in late autumn where the focus is on the use of bicycle lights and reflectors.

== Cycling-friendly workplace ==
Cycling-friendly workplace is a certification scheme offered by the association where workplaces can receive advice on bicycle-friendly arrangements, including safe bicycle parking, cloakrooms, drying rooms and a simple workshop, which promotes cycling as an affordable as well as climate and environmentally friendly way of commuting. In 2021, the University of Bergen became certified as Norway's first cycling-friendly university.

== Publications ==
The association have published or co-published books such as Sykkelferie i Norge (1986, 1993, 2005, literally "Cycling vacation in Norway") and Mekkeboka (2008, literally "The [bicycle] repair book").

== See also ==
- Norwegian Cycling Federation, the national governing body of cycle racing
