= Huub Artz =

Dutch cyclist

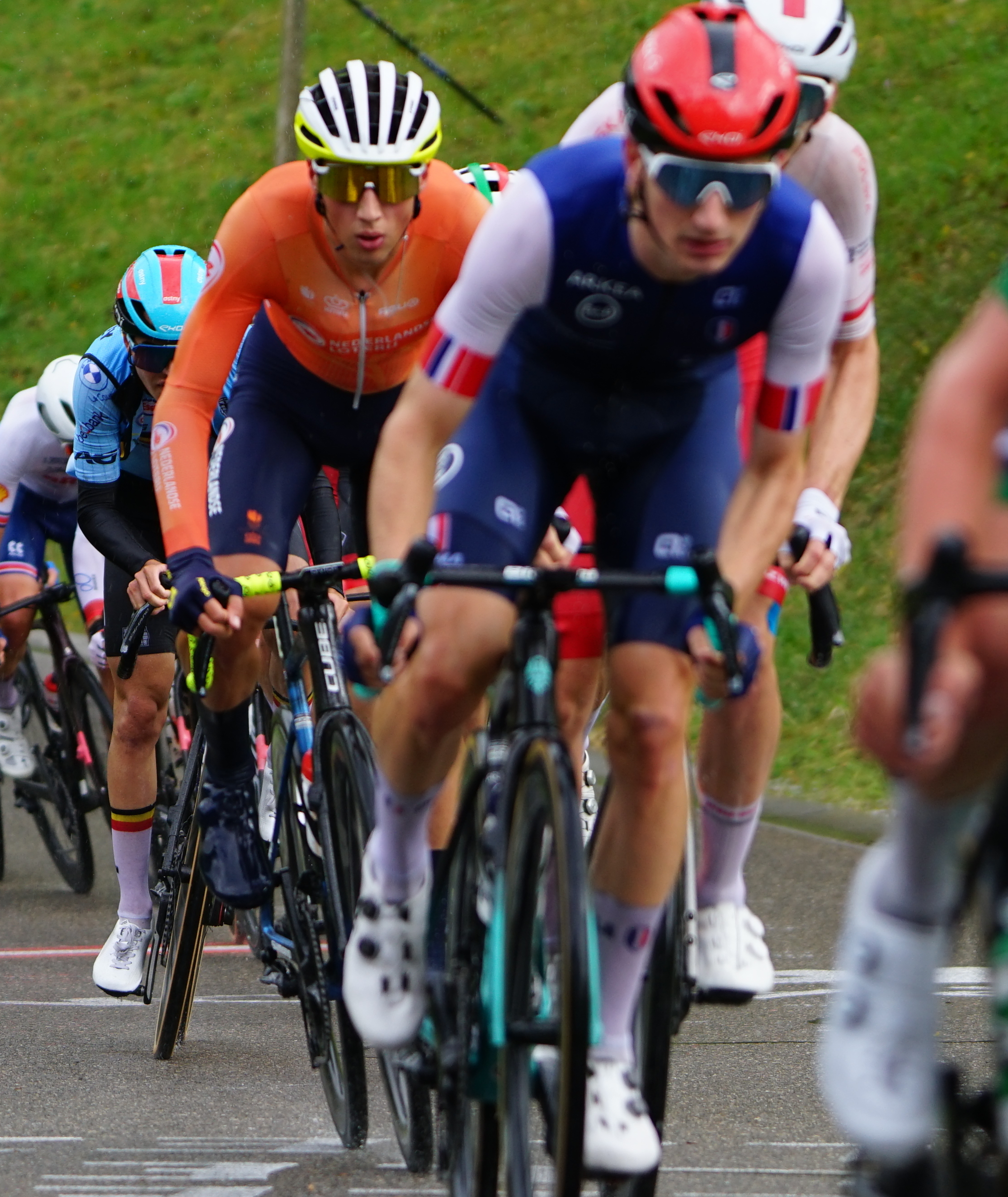
- Huub Artz during the 2024 UCI World Championships

Personal information
- Born: 14 May 2002 (age 24) Wintelre, Netherlands
- Height: 1.86 m (6 ft 1 in)
- Weight: 69 kg (152 lb)

Cycling career
- Sport: Cycling
- Current team: Lotto–Intermarché
- Discipline: Road
- Role: Rider

Amateur team
- 2019–2020: WV Schijndel U19

Professional teams
- 2021–2023: Metec–Solarwatt p/b Mantel
- 2024: Wanty–ReUz–Technord
- 2025: Intermarché–Wanty
- 2026–: Lotto–Intermarché

Major wins
- One-day races and Classics National Time Trial Championships (2026)
Medal record
Men's road bicycle racing
Representing Netherlands
European Championships
Gold medal – first place	2024 Limburg	Under-23 road race

Huub Artz (born 14 May 2002) is a Dutch cyclist, who currently rides for UCI WorldTeam Lotto–Intermarché.

== Major results ==
2019
8th Overall Oberösterreich Juniorenrundfahrt
2023
1st GP Color Code Bassenge
3rd Memorial Fred De Bruyne
4th Memoriał Jana Magiery
5th Visit Friesland Elfsteden Race
7th Midden-Brabant Poort Omloop
2024
1st Road race, UEC European Under-23 Road Championships
1st Gent–Wevelgem Beloften
1st Stage 7 Giro Next Gen
2nd Dorpenomloop Rucphen
2nd Wim Hendriks Trofee
7th Liège–Bastogne–Liège Espoirs
7th Paris–Roubaix Espoirs
2025
4th Time trial, National Road Championships
6th Overall Tour of Norway
2026 (1 pro win)
1st Time trial, National Road Championships
5th NXT Classic
9th Hamburg Cyclassics

=== Grand Tour general classification results timeline ===
Grand Tour	2025	2026
Giro d'Italia	—	—
Tour de France	—	IP
Vuelta a España	116	

Legend
—	Did not compete
DNF	Did not finish
