= Tim Rex =

Belgian cyclist

Personal information
- Born: 11 April 2004 (age 22)
- Height: 1.90 m (6 ft 3 in)
- Weight: 70 kg (154 lb)

Cycling career
- Sport: Cycling
- Current team: Visma–Lease a Bike
- Discipline: Road
- Role: Rider

Amateur team
- 2022: BH–Wallonie MTB Team

Professional teams
- 2023–2024: Circus–ReUz–Technord
- 2025: Visma–Lease a Bike Development
- 2026–: Visma–Lease a Bike

Tim Rex (born 11 April 2004) is a Belgian cyclist, who currently rides for UCI WorldTeam Visma–Lease a Bike.

His older brother Laurenz is also a professional cyclist.

== Major results ==
2023
8th Eschborn–Frankfurt Under-23
2024
1st Mountains classification, Course de la Paix U23 – Grand Prix Jeseníky
8th Liège–Bastogne–Liège U23
2025
8th Coppa Città di San Daniele
