= Ayco Bastiaens =

Belgian cyclist

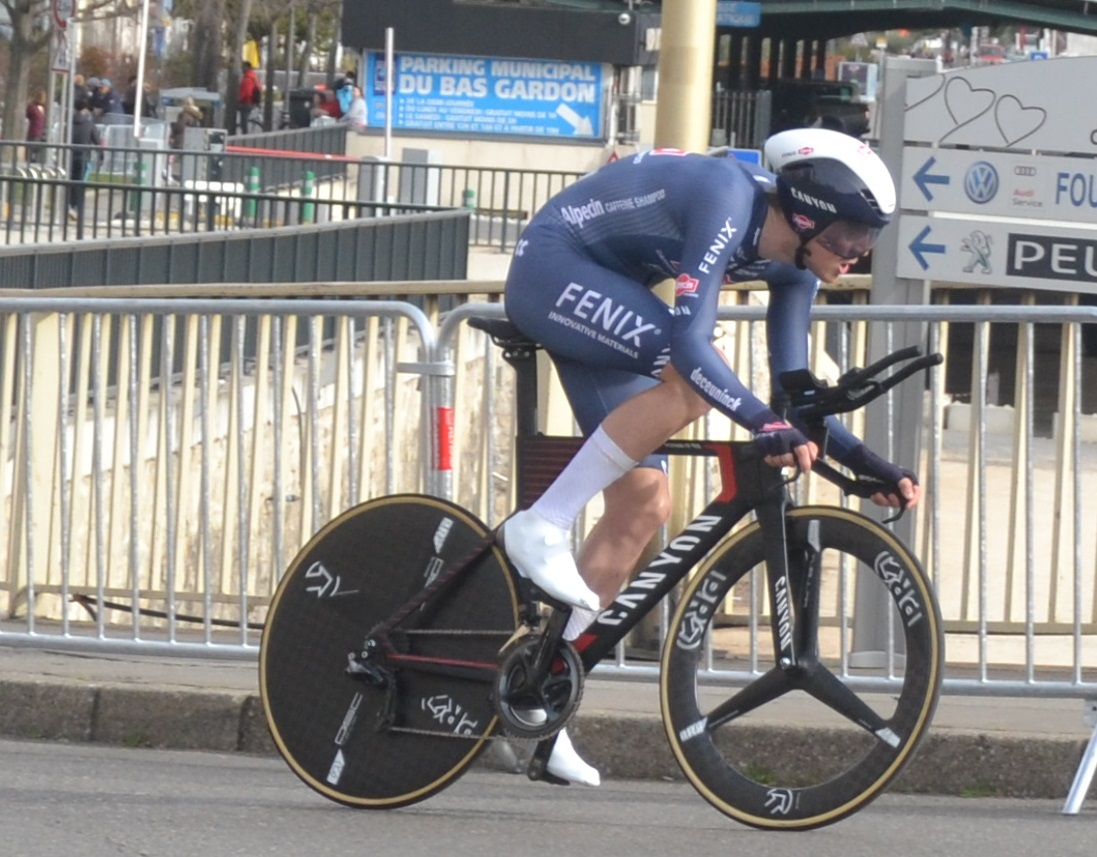
- Bastiaens at the 2022 Étoile de Bessèges

Personal information
- Born: 3 June 1996 (age 30) Aalst, Belgium
- Height: 1.91 m (6 ft 3 in)
- Weight: 73 kg (161 lb)

Cycling career
- Sport: Cycling
- Current team: Soudal–Quick-Step
- Discipline: Road
- Role: Rider

Amateur teams
- 2015: Bestbikes–Mathsalden Cycling Team
- 2016: Home Solution–Anmapa–Soenens
- 2017: Van Eyck Sport
- 2018–2019: United CT
- 2020: VDM Van Durme–Michiels–Trawobo CT

Professional teams
- 2021–2023: Alpecin–Fenix Development Team
- 2024–: Soudal–Quick-Step

Ayco Bastiaens (born 3 June 1996) is a Belgian cyclist, who currently rides for UCI WorldTeam Soudal–Quick-Step.

== Major results ==
2021
7th Overall Tour of Bulgaria
