= Uno-X Mobility Development Team =

Norwegian cycling team

Team information
- UCI code: UXD
- Registered: Norway
- Founded: 2018
- Discipline: Road
- Status: Club (2018–2020); UCI Continental (2021–)

Key personnel
- Team manager: Max Emil Kørner

Team name history
- 2018–2020 2021–2023 2024–: DARE Bikes Development Team; Uno-X Dare Development Team; Uno-X Mobility Development Team

The Uno-X Mobility Development Team is a Norwegian UCI Continental road cycling team founded in late 2018 that acts as the development program for UCI ProTeam Uno-X Mobility.

== Team roster ==
As of 16 February 2024.

Rider	Date of birth
Daniel Årnes (NOR)	6 June 2000 (age 26)
Simon Dalby (DEN)	29 January 2003 (age 23)
Halvor Dolven (NOR)	13 April 2004 (age 22)
Alfred Grenaae (DEN)	1 June 2004 (age 22)
Martin Solhaug Hansen (NOR)	11 May 2003 (age 23)
Mikal Grimstad Uglehus (NOR)	15 May 2005 (age 21)

Rider	Date of birth
Mads Landbo (DEN)	30 September 2004 (age 21)
Erik Madsen (NOR)	2 July 2002 (age 24)
Truls Nordhagen (NOR)	29 December 2002 (age 23)
Henrik Pedersen (DEN)	3 December 2004 (age 21)
Ola Sylling (NOR)	13 February 2003 (age 23)

== Major wins ==
2021
Stage 3 Baltic Chain Tour, Oskar Myrestøl Johansson
2022
Ringerike GP, Sakarias Koller Løland
Stage 3 Baltic Chain Tour, Tobias Hansen
2023
Fyen Rundt, Carl-Frederik Bévort
Sundvolden GP, Ådne Holter
Stage 3 Olympia's Tour, Erlend Blikra
