= Max van der Meulen =

Dutch cyclist

Personal information
- Born: 13 January 2004 (age 22) Utrecht, Netherlands
- Height: 1.70 m (5 ft 7 in)
- Weight: 67 kg (148 lb)

Cycling career
- Sport: Cycling
- Current team: Team Bahrain Victorious
- Discipline: Road
- Role: Rider
- Rider type: Climber

Amateur teams
- 2021: Restore Cycling Team
- 2022: Willebrord Wil Vooruit

Professional teams
- 2023: Development Team DSM
- 2024: CTF Victorious
- 2024: Team Bahrain Victorious (stagiaire)
- 2025–: Team Bahrain Victorious

Max van der Meulen (born 13 January 2004) is a Dutch cyclist, who currently rides for UCI WorldTeam Team Bahrain Victorious.

== Major results ==
2022
1st Overall Medzinárodné dni cyklistiky Dubnica nad Váhom

1st Mountains classification
1st Stages 2 & 3

1st Overall Watersley Junior Challenge

1st Mountains classification
1st Stage 3

1st Overall Tour de DMZ

1st Stage 3

1st La Classique des Alpes
2nd Overall Aubel–Thimister–Stavelot

1st Stage 3

4th Overall La Philippe Gilbert Juniors
4th Ronde van Vlaanderen Juniores
5th Overall Tour du Pays de Vaud
5th Road race, UEC European Junior Championships
8th Chrono des Nations Juniors
2023
6th Paris–Roubaix Espoirs
2024
Ronde de l'Isard

1st Points classification
1st Stage 2

2nd GP Slovenian Istria
3rd Zanè–Monte Cengio
6th Gran Premio di Poggiana
