= Fredrik Dversnes =

Norwegian racing cyclist

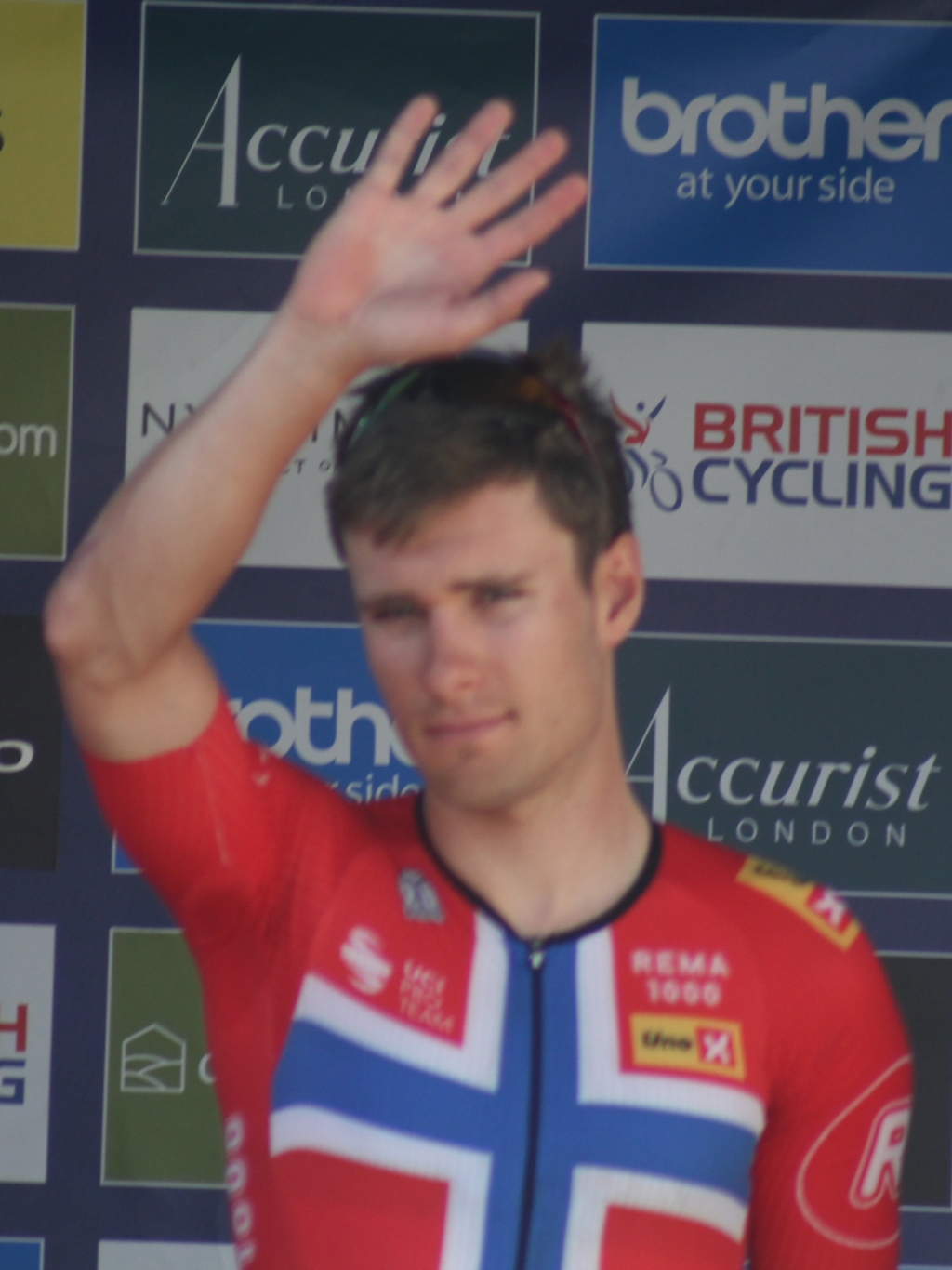

Personal information
- Born: 20 March 1997 (age 29) Egersund, Norway

Cycling career
- Sport: Cycling
- Current team: Uno-X Mobility
- Discipline: Road
- Role: Rider

Amateur teams
- 2018–2019: Sandnes SK
- 2021: Gazprom–RusVelo (stagiaire)

Professional teams
- 2020–2021: Team Coop
- 2022–: Uno-X Pro Cycling Team

Major wins
- Grand Tours Giro d'Italia 1 individual stage (2026) One-day races and Classics National Road Race Championships (2023)

Fredrik Dversnes (born 20 March 1997) is a Norwegian racing cyclist, who currently rides for UCI ProTeam Uno-X Mobility.

Dversnes won stage 15 of the 2026 Giro d'Italia; he won from a breakaway which also contained Mirco Maestri, Martin Marcellusi and Mattia Bais, on a day which had been expected to be contested by the sprinters.

== Major results ==
2019
8th Gylne Gutuer
2020
4th Lillehammer GP
9th Hafjell GP
2021
1st Overall International Tour of Rhodes
1st Mountains classification, Arctic Race of Norway
2023 (3 pro wins)
1st Road race, National Road Championships
1st Route Adélie de Vitré
1st Aggressive rider classification, Tour of Oman
2nd Overall Région Pays de la Loire Tour

1st Stage 4

3rd Paris–Camembert
2024 (1)
2nd Road race, National Road Championships
2nd Overall Tour Poitou-Charentes en Nouvelle-Aquitaine

1st Stage 1

3rd Overall Région Pays de la Loire Tour
5th Grand Prix du Morbihan
5th Paris–Camembert
5th Boucles de l'Aulne
2025 (2)
1st Stage 5 Tirreno–Adriatico
1st Stage 4 Arctic Race of Norway
2nd Overall AlUla Tour
National Road Championships

4th Time trial
5th Road race

5th Tro-Bro Léon
7th Veneto Classic
9th Overall Tour of Norway
2026 (1)
1st Stage 15 Giro d'Italia
6th Brabantse Pijl
