= Jonas Geens =

Belgian cyclist (born 1999)

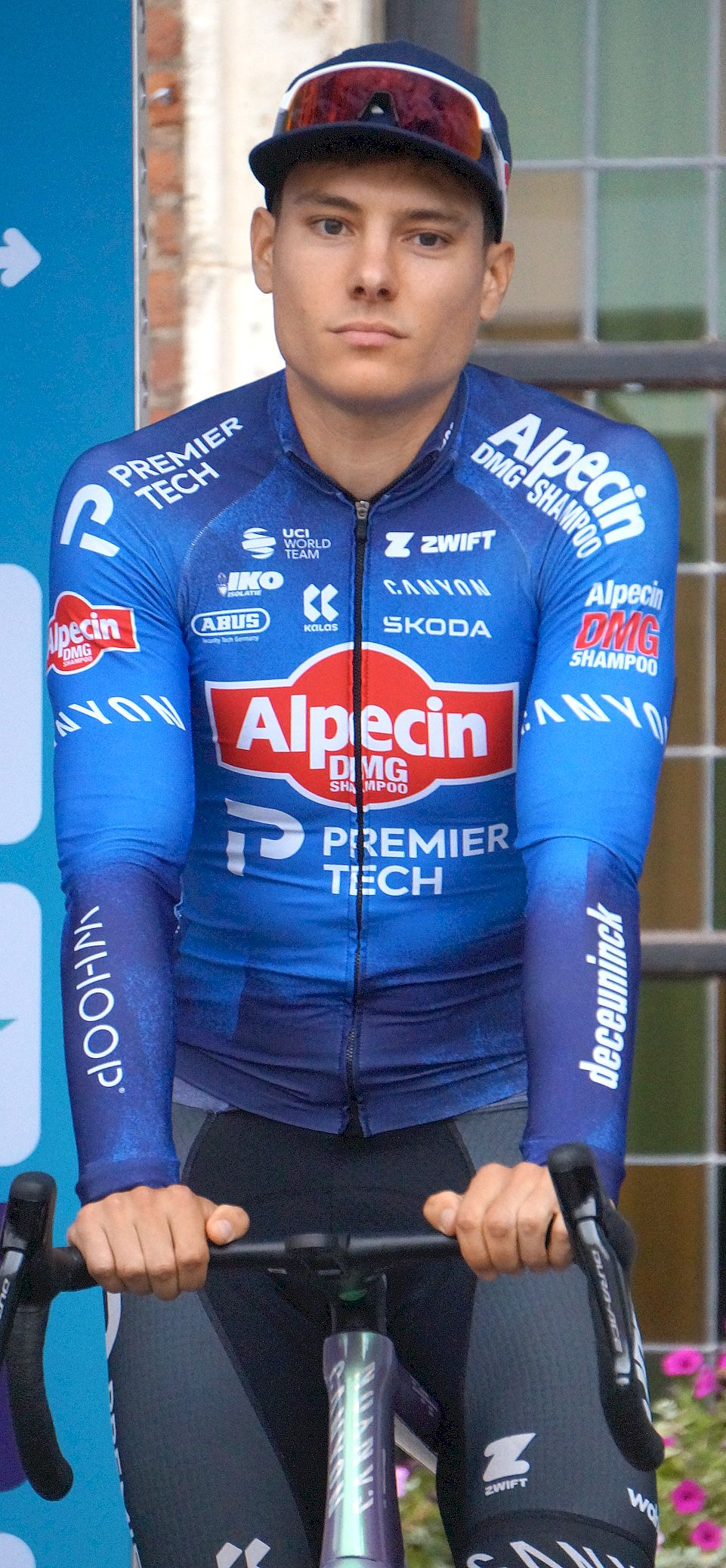

Personal information
- Born: 4 January 1999 (age 27) Duffel, Belgium
- Height: 1.83 m (6 ft 0 in)
- Weight: 78 kg (172 lb)

Cycling career
- Sport: Cycling
- Current team: Alpecin–Premier Tech
- Discipline: Road
- Role: Rider

Amateur teams
- 2022: Van Mossel Heist Cycling Team
- 2024: Morbihan Adris Gwendal Oliveux

Professional teams
- 2023: Tarteletto–Isorex
- 2025: Team Flanders–Baloise
- 2026–: Alpecin–Premier Tech

Jonas Geens (born 4 January 1999) is a Belgian cyclist, who currently rides UCI WorldTeam Alpecin–Premier Tech.

== Career ==
Geens came to cycling relatively late, he initially took part in athletics, but he abandoned the sport due to persistent injuries. He started cycling in 2022 with the Van Mossel Heist Cycling Team, before signing with UCI Continental team Tarteletto–Isorex in 2023. With the team, he took the overall victory in the Tour de la Mirabelle in May 2023.

In 2025, he signed with UCI ProTeam Team Flanders–Baloise after having a successful 2024 season on the French amateur circuit. The following season he UCI WorldTeam Alpecin–Premier Tech after having placed in the top 10 of the 2025 Tour of Norway and Région Pays de la Loire Tour.

== Major results ==
2023
1st Overall Tour de la Mirabelle
2024
8th Overall Kreiz Breizh Elites
2025
8th Overall Tour of Norway
9th Overall Région Pays de la Loire Tour

=== Grand Tour general classification results timeline ===
Grand Tour	2026
Giro d'Italia	107
Tour de France	
Vuelta a España	

Legend
—	Did not compete
DNF	Did not finish
IP	Race in Progress
