= Ådne Holter =

Norwegian road cyclist

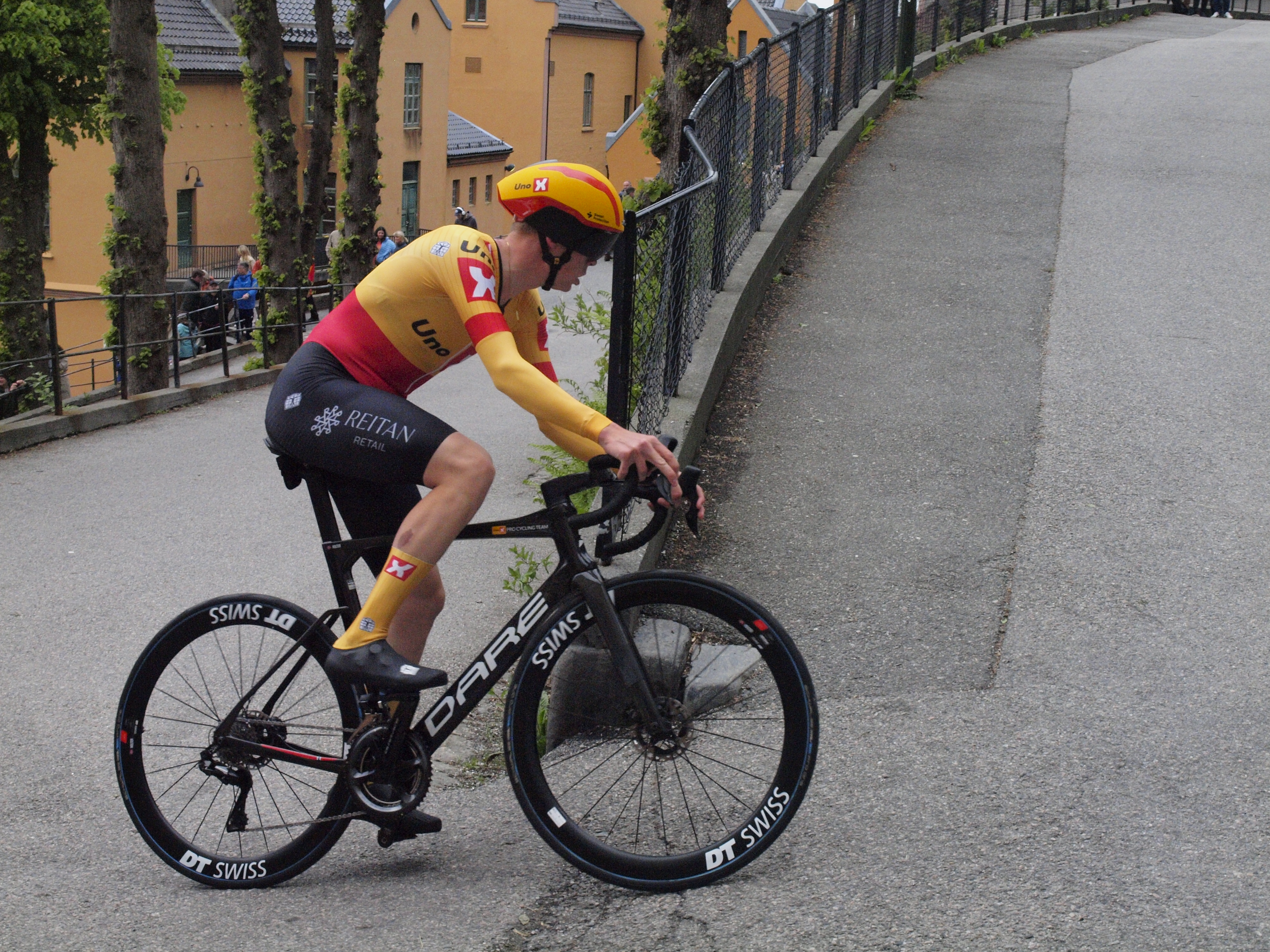
- Holter at the 2023 Tour of Norway

Personal information
- Born: 8 July 2000 (age 26) Lillehammer, Norway
- Height: 1.84 m (6 ft 0 in)

Cycling career
- Sport: Cycling
- Current team: Uno-X Mobility
- Discipline: Road
- Role: Rider

Amateur teams
- 2017–2018: Lillehammer CK Junior
- 2019: Dare Bikes Development Team
- 2019: Lillehammer CK
- 2021: Lillehammer CK

Professional teams
- 2019: Uno-X Norwegian Development Team (stagiaire)
- 2020: Joker Fuel of Norway
- 2022–: Uno-X Pro Cycling Team

Ådne Holter (born 8 July 2000) is a Norwegian cyclist, who currently rides for UCI ProTeam Uno-X Mobility.

== Major results ==
2018
3rd Time trial, National Junior Road Championships
2019
3rd Overall Vuelta Ciclista a León
2020
5th Hafjell TT
8th Lillehammer GP
2021
4th Gylne Gutuer
5th Lillehammer GP
2022
4th Overall Tour of Antalya
5th Time trial, National Road Championships
6th Grand Prix Alanya
2023
1st Sundvolden GP
7th Overall Tour of Norway
8th Ringerike GP
2024
3rd Overall Tour of Norway
4th Overall Tour of Antalya
2025
4th Overall AlUla Tour
7th Overall Tour of Norway
2026
3rd Trofeo Calvià
