= Sakarias Koller Løland =

Norwegian road cyclist (born 2001)

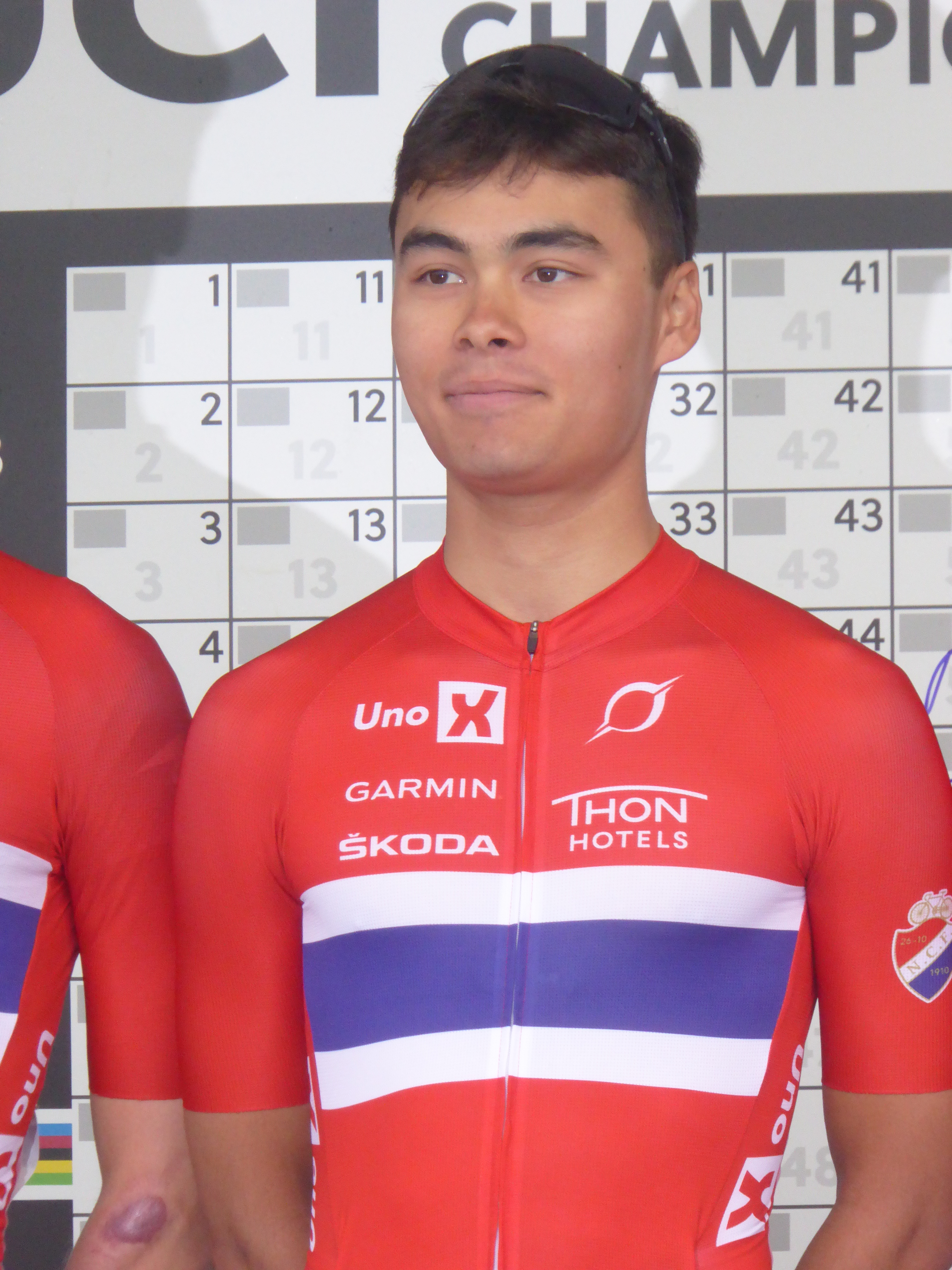
- Løland in 2023

Personal information
- Born: 20 September 2001 (age 25) Bergen, Norway
- Height: 1.80 m (5 ft 11 in)

Cycling career
- Sport: Cycling
- Current team: Uno-X Mobility
- Discipline: Road
- Role: Rider

Amateur teams
- 2018–2019: Ringerike SK Junior
- 2020: Ringerike SK
- 2020: Dare Bikes Development Team

Professional teams
- 2021–2023: Uno-X Dare Development Team
- 2024–: Uno-X Mobility

Major wins
- One-day races and Classics Veneto Classic (2025)

Sakarias Koller Løland (born 20 September 2001) is a Norwegian cyclist who currently rides for UCI ProTeam Uno-X Mobility.

== Major results ==
2019
1st Road race, National Junior Road Championships
1st Stage 1 Saarland Trofeo
5th Gent–Wevelgem Juniors
9th Kuurne–Brussels–Kuurne Juniors
2020
5th Gylne Gutuer
2021
8th Skive–Løbet
2022
1st Ringerike GP
4th Trofeo Alcide Degasperi
8th Scandinavian Race in Uppsala
9th Grote Prijs Rik Van Looy
10th Overall Baltic Chain Tour
10th Overall Le Triptyque des Monts et Châteaux
2023
1st Paris–Tours Espoirs
5th Overall Okolo Jižních Čech

1st Points classification
1st Stage 1

5th Grand Prix de la Ville de Lillers
2025 (1 pro win)
1st Veneto Classic
1st Ringerike GP
8th Paris–Camembert
2026 (1)
1st Trofeo Matteotti
10th Coppa Bernocchi
