= Norwegian Cycling Federation =

National governing body of cycle racing in Norway

NCF logo

The Norwegian Cycling Federation or NCF (In Norwegian: Norges Cykleforbund) is the national governing body of cycle racing in Norway.

The NCF is a member of the UCI and the UEC.

== See also ==
- Norwegian Cyclists' Association, association for cycling as means of daily transport
