= 2026 Giro d'Italia, Stage 12 to Stage 21 =

Cycling results

The 2026 Giro d'Italia was the 109th edition of the Giro d'Italia, one of cycling's Grand Tours. The Giro began in Nessebar on 8 May, and stage 12 occurred on 21 May with a stage to Novi Ligure. The race finished in Rome on 31 May.

== Classification standings ==
Legend
Denotes the leader of the general classification	Denotes the leader of the mountains classification
Denotes the leader of the points classification	Denotes the leader of the young rider classification
Denotes the winner of the combativity award	

== Stage 12 ==
21 May 2026 — Imperia to Novi Ligure, 175 km (109 mi)

Stage 12 Result
Rank	Rider	Team	Time
1	Alec Segaert (BEL)	Team Bahrain Victorious	3h 53' 00"
2	Toon Aerts (BEL)	Lotto–Intermarché	+ 3"
3	Guillermo Thomas Silva (URU)	XDS Astana Team	+ 3"
4	Ethan Vernon (GBR)	NSN Cycling Team	+ 3"
5	Jasper Stuyven (BEL)	Soudal–Quick-Step	+ 3"
6	Orluis Aular (VEN)	Movistar Team	+ 3"
7	Madis Mihkels (EST)	EF Education–EasyPost	+ 3"
8	Jhonatan Narváez (ECU)	UAE Team Emirates XRG	+ 3"
9	Edoardo Zambanini (ITA)	Team Bahrain Victorious	+ 3"
10	Sakarias Koller Løland (NOR)	Uno-X Mobility	+ 3"

General classification after Stage 12
Rank	Rider	Team	Time
1	Afonso Eulálio (POR)	Team Bahrain Victorious	48h 10' 38"
2	Jonas Vingegaard (DEN)	Visma–Lease a Bike	+ 33"
3	Thymen Arensman (NED)	Netcompany INEOS	+ 2' 03"
4	Felix Gall (AUT)	Decathlon CMA CGM	+ 2' 30"
5	Ben O'Connor (AUS)	Team Jayco–AlUla	+ 2' 50"
6	Jai Hindley (AUS)	Red Bull–Bora–Hansgrohe	+ 3' 12"
7	Michael Storer (AUS)	Tudor Pro Cycling Team	+ 3' 34"
8	Derek Gee-West (CAN)	Lidl–Trek	+ 3' 40"
9	Giulio Pellizzari (ITA)	Red Bull–Bora–Hansgrohe	+ 3' 42"
10	Chris Harper (AUS)	Pinarello–Q36.5 Pro Cycling Team	+ 4' 15"

== Stage 13 ==
22 May 2026 — Alessandria to Verbania, 189 km (117 mi)

Stage 13 Result
Rank	Rider	Team	Time
1	Alberto Bettiol (ITA)	XDS Astana Team	3h 51' 33"
2	Andreas Leknessund (NOR)	Uno-X Mobility	+ 26"
3	Jasper Stuyven (BEL)	Soudal–Quick-Step	+ 44"
4	Michael Valgren (DEN)	EF Education–EasyPost	+ 44"
5	Mark Donovan (GBR)	Pinarello–Q36.5 Pro Cycling Team	+ 44"
6	Josh Kench (NZL)	Groupama–FDJ United	+ 44"
7	Mikkel Bjerg (DEN)	UAE Team Emirates XRG	+ 1' 33"
8	Francesco Busatto (ITA)	Alpecin–Premier Tech	+ 1' 35"
9	Markus Hoelgaard (NOR)	Uno-X Mobility	+ 1' 35"
10	Diego Pablo Sevilla (ESP)	Team Polti VisitMalta	+ 1' 35"

General classification after Stage 13
Rank	Rider	Team	Time
1	Afonso Eulálio (POR)	Team Bahrain Victorious	52h 15' 17"
2	Jonas Vingegaard (DEN)	Visma–Lease a Bike	+ 33"
3	Thymen Arensman (NED)	Netcompany INEOS	+ 2' 03"
4	Felix Gall (AUT)	Decathlon CMA CGM	+ 2' 30"
5	Ben O'Connor (AUS)	Team Jayco–AlUla	+ 2' 50"
6	Jai Hindley (AUS)	Red Bull–Bora–Hansgrohe	+ 3' 12"
7	Michael Storer (AUS)	Tudor Pro Cycling Team	+ 3' 34"
8	Derek Gee-West (CAN)	Lidl–Trek	+ 3' 40"
9	Giulio Pellizzari (ITA)	Red Bull–Bora–Hansgrohe	+ 3' 42"
10	Chris Harper (AUS)	Pinarello–Q36.5 Pro Cycling Team	+ 4' 15"

== Stage 14 ==
23 May 2026 — Aosta to Pila, 133 km (83 mi)

Stage 14 Result
Rank	Rider	Team	Time
1	Jonas Vingegaard (DEN)	Visma–Lease a Bike	3h 53' 01"
2	Felix Gall (AUT)	Decathlon CMA CGM	+ 49"
3	Jai Hindley (AUS)	Red Bull–Bora–Hansgrohe	+ 58"
4	Davide Piganzoli (ITA)	Visma–Lease a Bike	+ 1' 03"
5	Giulio Pellizzari (ITA)	Red Bull–Bora–Hansgrohe	+ 1' 03"
6	Thymen Arensman (NED)	Netcompany INEOS	+ 1' 23"
7	Michael Storer (AUS)	Tudor Pro Cycling Team	+ 1' 35"
8	Wout Poels (NED)	Unibet Rose Rockets	+ 2' 08"
9	Jan Hirt (CZE)	NSN Cycling Team	+ 2' 08"
10	Egan Bernal (COL)	Netcompany INEOS	+ 2' 08"

General classification after Stage 14
Rank	Rider	Team	Time
1	Jonas Vingegaard (DEN)	Visma–Lease a Bike	56h 08' 41"
2	Afonso Eulálio (POR)	Team Bahrain Victorious	+ 2' 26"
3	Felix Gall (AUT)	Decathlon CMA CGM	+ 2' 50"
4	Thymen Arensman (NED)	Netcompany INEOS	+ 3' 03"
5	Jai Hindley (AUS)	Red Bull–Bora–Hansgrohe	+ 3' 43"
6	Giulio Pellizzari (ITA)	Red Bull–Bora–Hansgrohe	+ 4' 22"
7	Michael Storer (AUS)	Tudor Pro Cycling Team	+ 4' 46"
8	Ben O'Connor (AUS)	Team Jayco–AlUla	+ 5' 22"
9	Derek Gee-West (CAN)	Lidl–Trek	+ 5' 41"
10	Davide Piganzoli (ITA)	Visma–Lease a Bike	+ 6' 13"

== Stage 15 ==
24 May 2026 — Voghera to Milan, 157 km (98 mi)

Stage 15 Result
Rank	Rider	Team	Time
1	Fredrik Dversnes (NOR)	Uno-X Mobility	3h 03' 18"
2	Mirco Maestri (ITA)	Team Polti VisitMalta	+ 0"
3	Martin Marcellusi (ITA)	Bardiani–CSF 7 Saber	+ 0"
4	Mattia Bais (ITA)	Team Polti VisitMalta	+ 0"
5	Paul Magnier (FRA)	Soudal–Quick-Step	+ 57"
6	Dylan Groenewegen (NED)	Unibet Rose Rockets	+ 57"
7	Tobias Lund Andresen (DEN)	Decathlon CMA CGM	+ 57"
8	Ethan Vernon (GBR)	NSN Cycling Team	+ 57"
9	Paul Penhoët (FRA)	Groupama–FDJ United	+ 57"
10	Luca Mozzato (ITA)	Tudor Pro Cycling Team	+ 57"

General classification after Stage 15
Rank	Rider	Team	Time
1	Jonas Vingegaard (DEN)	Visma–Lease a Bike	59h 12' 56"
2	Afonso Eulálio (POR)	Team Bahrain Victorious	+ 2' 26"
3	Felix Gall (AUT)	Decathlon CMA CGM	+ 2' 50"
4	Thymen Arensman (NED)	Netcompany INEOS	+ 3' 03"
5	Jai Hindley (AUS)	Red Bull–Bora–Hansgrohe	+ 3' 43"
6	Giulio Pellizzari (ITA)	Red Bull–Bora–Hansgrohe	+ 4' 22"
7	Michael Storer (AUS)	Tudor Pro Cycling Team	+ 4' 46"
8	Ben O'Connor (AUS)	Team Jayco–AlUla	+ 5' 22"
9	Derek Gee-West (CAN)	Lidl–Trek	+ 5' 41"
10	Davide Piganzoli (ITA)	Visma–Lease a Bike	+ 6' 13"

== Rest day 3 ==
25 May 2026 — Milan

== Stage 16 ==
26 May 2026 — Bellinzona (Switzerland) to Carì (Switzerland), 113 km (70 mi)

Stage 16 Result
Rank	Rider	Team	Time
1	Jonas Vingegaard (DEN)	Visma–Lease a Bike	2h 57' 40"
2	Felix Gall (AUT)	Decathlon CMA CGM	+ 1' 09"
3	Jai Hindley (AUS)	Red Bull–Bora–Hansgrohe	+ 1' 11"
4	Thymen Arensman (NED)	Netcompany INEOS	+ 1' 14"
5	Derek Gee-West (CAN)	Lidl–Trek	+ 1' 18"
6	Davide Piganzoli (ITA)	Visma–Lease a Bike	+ 1' 34"
7	Egan Bernal (COL)	Netcompany INEOS	+ 2' 04"
8	Michael Storer (AUS)	Tudor Pro Cycling Team	+ 2' 18"
9	Mathys Rondel (FRA)	Tudor Pro Cycling Team	+ 2' 55"
10	Wout Poels (NED)	Unibet Rose Rockets	+ 3' 04"

General classification after Stage 16
Rank	Rider	Team	Time
1	Jonas Vingegaard (DEN)	Visma–Lease a Bike	62h 10' 26"
2	Felix Gall (AUT)	Decathlon CMA CGM	+ 4' 03"
3	Thymen Arensman (NED)	Netcompany INEOS	+ 4' 27"
4	Jai Hindley (AUS)	Red Bull–Bora–Hansgrohe	+ 5' 00"
5	Afonso Eulálio (POR)	Team Bahrain Victorious	+ 5' 40"
6	Derek Gee-West (CAN)	Lidl–Trek	+ 7' 09"
7	Michael Storer (AUS)	Tudor Pro Cycling Team	+ 7' 14"
8	Davide Piganzoli (ITA)	Visma–Lease a Bike	+ 7' 57"
9	Ben O'Connor (AUS)	Team Jayco–AlUla	+ 9' 20"
10	Egan Bernal (COL)	Netcompany INEOS	+ 9' 44"

== Stage 17 ==
27 May 2026 — Cassano d'Adda to Andalo, 202 km (126 mi)

Stage 17 Result
Rank	Rider	Team	Time
1	Michael Valgren (DEN)	EF Education–EasyPost	4h 41' 33"
2	Andreas Leknessund (NOR)	Uno-X Mobility	+ 3"
3	Damiano Caruso (ITA)	Team Bahrain Victorious	+ 6"
4	Aleksandr Vlasov	Red Bull–Bora–Hansgrohe	+ 6"
5	Einer Rubio (COL)	Movistar Team	+ 6"
6	Igor Arrieta (ESP)	UAE Team Emirates XRG	+ 14"
7	Gianmarco Garofoli (ITA)	Soudal–Quick-Step	+ 52"
8	David de la Cruz (ESP)	Pinarello–Q36.5 Pro Cycling Team	+ 1' 08"
9	Jhonatan Narváez (ECU)	UAE Team Emirates XRG	+ 1' 44"
10	Mark Donovan (GBR)	Pinarello–Q36.5 Pro Cycling Team	+ 1' 44"

General classification after Stage 17
Rank	Rider	Team	Time
1	Jonas Vingegaard (DEN)	Visma–Lease a Bike	66h 57' 14"
2	Felix Gall (AUT)	Decathlon CMA CGM	+ 4' 03"
3	Thymen Arensman (NED)	Netcompany INEOS	+ 4' 27"
4	Jai Hindley (AUS)	Red Bull–Bora–Hansgrohe	+ 5' 00"
5	Afonso Eulálio (POR)	Team Bahrain Victorious	+ 5' 40"
6	Derek Gee-West (CAN)	Lidl–Trek	+ 7' 09"
7	Michael Storer (AUS)	Tudor Pro Cycling Team	+ 7' 14"
8	Davide Piganzoli (ITA)	Visma–Lease a Bike	+ 7' 57"
9	Damiano Caruso (ITA)	Team Bahrain Victorious	+ 8' 34"
10	Ben O'Connor (AUS)	Team Jayco–AlUla	+ 9' 20"

== Stage 18 ==
28 May 2026 — Fai della Paganella to Pieve di Soligo, 171 km (106 mi)

Stage 18 Result
Rank	Rider	Team	Time
1	Paul Magnier (FRA)	Soudal–Quick-Step	3h 46' 50"
2	Edoardo Zambanini (ITA)	Team Bahrain Victorious	+ 0"
3	Jonathan Milan (ITA)	Lidl–Trek	+ 0"
4	Francesco Busatto (ITA)	Alpecin–Premier Tech	+ 0"
5	Corbin Strong (NZL)	NSN Cycling Team	+ 0"
6	Guillermo Thomas Silva (URU)	XDS Astana Team	+ 0"
7	Madis Mihkels (EST)	EF Education–EasyPost	+ 0"
8	Filippo Magli (ITA)	Bardiani–CSF 7 Saber	+ 0"
9	Sakarias Koller Løland (NOR)	Uno-X Mobility	+ 0"
10	Lukáš Kubiš (SVK)	Unibet Rose Rockets	+ 0"

General classification after Stage 18
Rank	Rider	Team	Time
1	Jonas Vingegaard (DEN)	Visma–Lease a Bike	70h 44' 04"
2	Felix Gall (AUT)	Decathlon CMA CGM	+ 4' 03"
3	Thymen Arensman (NED)	Netcompany INEOS	+ 4' 27"
4	Jai Hindley (AUS)	Red Bull–Bora–Hansgrohe	+ 5' 00"
5	Afonso Eulálio (POR)	Team Bahrain Victorious	+ 5' 40"
6	Derek Gee-West (CAN)	Lidl–Trek	+ 7' 09"
7	Michael Storer (AUS)	Tudor Pro Cycling Team	+ 7' 14"
8	Davide Piganzoli (ITA)	Visma–Lease a Bike	+ 7' 57"
9	Damiano Caruso (ITA)	Team Bahrain Victorious	+ 8' 34"
10	Ben O'Connor (AUS)	Team Jayco–AlUla	+ 9' 20"

== Stage 19 ==
29 May 2026 — Feltre to Alleghe, 151 km (94 mi)

Stage 19 Result
Rank	Rider	Team	Time
1	Sepp Kuss (USA)	Visma–Lease a Bike	4h 28' 33"
2	Derek Gee-West (CAN)	Lidl–Trek	+ 13"
3	Giulio Ciccone (ITA)	Lidl–Trek	+ 36"
4	Felix Gall (AUT)	Decathlon CMA CGM	+ 39"
5	Jonas Vingegaard (DEN)	Visma–Lease a Bike	+ 39"
6	Jai Hindley (AUS)	Red Bull–Bora–Hansgrohe	+ 43"
7	Damiano Caruso (ITA)	Team Bahrain Victorious	+ 1' 06"
8	Davide Piganzoli (ITA)	Visma–Lease a Bike	+ 1' 11"
9	Einer Rubio (COL)	Movistar Team	+ 1' 19"
10	Michael Storer (AUS)	Tudor Pro Cycling Team	+ 1' 19"

General classification after Stage 19
Rank	Rider	Team	Time
1	Jonas Vingegaard (DEN)	Visma–Lease a Bike	75h 13' 16"
2	Felix Gall (AUT)	Decathlon CMA CGM	+ 4' 03"
3	Jai Hindley (AUS)	Red Bull–Bora–Hansgrohe	+ 5' 04"
4	Thymen Arensman (NED)	Netcompany INEOS	+ 5' 33"
5	Derek Gee-West (CAN)	Lidl–Trek	+ 6' 31"
6	Afonso Eulálio (POR)	Team Bahrain Victorious	+ 7' 26"
7	Michael Storer (AUS)	Tudor Pro Cycling Team	+ 7' 50"
8	Davide Piganzoli (ITA)	Visma–Lease a Bike	+ 8' 29"
9	Damiano Caruso (ITA)	Team Bahrain Victorious	+ 9' 01"
10	Egan Bernal (COL)	Netcompany INEOS	+ 11' 19"

== Stage 20 ==
30 May 2026 — Gemona del Friuli to Piancavallo, 200 km (120 mi)

Stage 20 Result
Rank	Rider	Team	Time
1	Jonas Vingegaard (DEN)	Visma–Lease a Bike	5h 03' 55"
2	Felix Gall (AUT)	Decathlon CMA CGM	+ 1' 15"
3	Jai Hindley (AUS)	Red Bull–Bora–Hansgrohe	+ 1' 15"
4	Derek Gee-West (CAN)	Lidl–Trek	+ 1' 15"
5	Thymen Arensman (NED)	Netcompany INEOS	+ 1' 19"
6	Egan Bernal (COL)	Netcompany INEOS	+ 1' 25"
7	Afonso Eulálio (POR)	Team Bahrain Victorious	+ 2' 03"
8	Damiano Caruso (ITA)	Team Bahrain Victorious	+ 2' 13"
9	Michael Storer (AUS)	Tudor Pro Cycling Team	+ 2' 13"
10	Davide Piganzoli (ITA)	Visma–Lease a Bike	+ 2' 13"

General classification after Stage 20
Rank	Rider	Team	Time
1	Jonas Vingegaard (DEN)	Visma–Lease a Bike	80h 17' 01"
2	Felix Gall (AUT)	Decathlon CMA CGM	+ 5' 22"
3	Jai Hindley (AUS)	Red Bull–Bora–Hansgrohe	+ 6' 25"
4	Thymen Arensman (NED)	Netcompany INEOS	+ 7' 02"
5	Derek Gee-West (CAN)	Lidl–Trek	+ 7' 56"
6	Afonso Eulálio (POR)	Team Bahrain Victorious	+ 9' 39"
7	Michael Storer (AUS)	Tudor Pro Cycling Team	+ 10' 13"
8	Davide Piganzoli (ITA)	Visma–Lease a Bike	+ 10' 52"
9	Damiano Caruso (ITA)	Team Bahrain Victorious	+ 11' 24"
10	Egan Bernal (COL)	Netcompany INEOS	+ 12' 54"

== Stage 21 ==
31 May 2026 — Rome to Rome, 131 km (81 mi)

Stage 21 Result
Rank	Rider	Team	Time
1	Jonathan Milan (ITA)	Lidl–Trek	3h 05' 50"
2	Giovanni Lonardi (ITA)	Team Polti VisitMalta	+ 0"
3	Paul Penhoët (FRA)	Groupama–FDJ United	+ 0"
4	Dylan Groenewegen (NED)	Unibet Rose Rockets	+ 0"
5	Madis Mihkels (EST)	EF Education–EasyPost	+ 0"
6	Jensen Plowright (AUS)	Alpecin–Premier Tech	+ 0"
7	Tobias Lund Andresen (DEN)	Decathlon CMA CGM	+ 0"
8	Corbin Strong (NZL)	NSN Cycling Team	+ 0"
9	Toon Aerts (BEL)	Lotto–Intermarché	+ 0"
10	Luca Mozzato (ITA)	Tudor Pro Cycling Team	+ 0"

General classification after Stage 21
Rank	Rider	Team	Time
1	Jonas Vingegaard (DEN)	Visma–Lease a Bike	83h 22' 51"
2	Felix Gall (AUT)	Decathlon CMA CGM	+ 5' 22"
3	Jai Hindley (AUS)	Red Bull–Bora–Hansgrohe	+ 6' 25"
4	Thymen Arensman (NED)	Netcompany INEOS	+ 7' 02"
5	Derek Gee-West (CAN)	Lidl–Trek	+ 7' 56"
6	Afonso Eulálio (POR)	Team Bahrain Victorious	+ 9' 39"
7	Michael Storer (AUS)	Tudor Pro Cycling Team	+ 10' 13"
8	Davide Piganzoli (ITA)	Visma–Lease a Bike	+ 10' 52"
9	Damiano Caruso (ITA)	Team Bahrain Victorious	+ 11' 24"
10	Egan Bernal (COL)	Netcompany INEOS	+ 12' 54"
