= 2026 Giro d'Italia, Stage 1 to Stage 11 =

Cycling results

The 2026 Giro d'Italia is the 109th edition of the Giro d'Italia, one of cycling's Grand Tours. The Giro began in Nessebar on 8 May, and stage 11 occurred on 20 May with a stage to Chiavari. The race will finish in Rome on 31 May.

== Classification standings ==
Legend
Denotes the leader of the general classification	Denotes the leader of the mountains classification
Denotes the leader of the points classification	Denotes the leader of the young rider classification
Denotes the winner of the combativity award	

== Stage 1 ==
8 May 2026 — Nessebar (Bulgaria) to Burgas (Bulgaria), 147 km (91 mi)

Stage 1 Result
Rank	Rider	Team	Time
1	Paul Magnier (FRA)	Soudal–Quick-Step	3h 21' 08"
2	Tobias Lund Andresen (DEN)	Decathlon CMA CGM	+ 0"
3	Ethan Vernon (GBR)	NSN Cycling Team	+ 0"
4	Jonathan Milan (ITA)	Lidl–Trek	+ 0"
5	Madis Mihkels (EST)	EF Education–EasyPost	+ 0"
6	Giovanni Lonardi (ITA)	Team Polti VisitMalta	+ 0"
7	Pascal Ackermann (GER)	Team Jayco–AlUla	+ 0"
8	Tord Gudmestad (NOR)	Decathlon CMA CGM	+ 0"
9	Max Walscheid (GER)	Lidl–Trek	+ 0"
10	Dries Van Gestel (BEL)	Soudal–Quick-Step	+ 0"

General classification after Stage 1
Rank	Rider	Team	Time
1	Paul Magnier (FRA)	Soudal–Quick-Step	3h 20' 58"
2	Tobias Lund Andresen (DEN)	Decathlon CMA CGM	+ 4"
3	Manuele Tarozzi (ITA)	Bardiani–CSF 7 Saber	+ 4"
4	Ethan Vernon (GBR)	NSN Cycling Team	+ 6"
5	Diego Pablo Sevilla (ESP)	Team Polti VisitMalta	+ 6"
6	António Morgado (POR)	UAE Team Emirates XRG	+ 8"
7	Jonathan Milan (ITA)	Lidl–Trek	+ 10"
8	Madis Mihkels (EST)	EF Education–EasyPost	+ 10"
9	Giovanni Lonardi (ITA)	Team Polti VisitMalta	+ 10"
10	Pascal Ackermann (GER)	Team Jayco–AlUla	+ 10"

== Stage 2 ==
9 May 2026 — Burgas (Bulgaria) to Veliko Tarnovo (Bulgaria), 221 km (137 mi)

Stage 2 Result
Rank	Rider	Team	Time
1	Guillermo Thomas Silva (URU)	XDS Astana Team	5h 39' 25"
2	Florian Stork (GER)	Tudor Pro Cycling Team	+ 0"
3	Giulio Ciccone (ITA)	Lidl–Trek	+ 0"
4	Christian Scaroni (ITA)	XDS Astana Team	+ 0"
5	Giulio Pellizzari (ITA)	Red Bull–Bora–Hansgrohe	+ 0"
6	Matteo Sobrero (ITA)	Lidl–Trek	+ 0"
7	Andreas Leknessund (NOR)	Uno-X Mobility	+ 0"
8	Jan Christen (SUI)	UAE Team Emirates XRG	+ 0"
9	Martin Tjøtta (NOR)	Uno-X Mobility	+ 0"
10	Mathys Rondel (FRA)	Tudor Pro Cycling Team	+ 0"

General classification after Stage 2
Rank	Rider	Team	Time
1	Guillermo Thomas Silva (URU)	XDS Astana Team	9h 00' 23"
2	Florian Stork (GER)	Tudor Pro Cycling Team	+ 4"
3	Egan Bernal (COL)	Netcompany INEOS	+ 4"
4	Thymen Arensman (NED)	Netcompany INEOS	+ 6"
5	Giulio Ciccone (ITA)	Lidl–Trek	+ 6"
6	Jan Christen (SUI)	UAE Team Emirates XRG	+ 10"
7	Johannes Kulset (NOR)	Uno-X Mobility	+ 10"
8	Martin Tjøtta (NOR)	Uno-X Mobility	+ 10"
9	Lennert Van Eetvelt (BEL)	Lotto–Intermarché	+ 10"
10	Darren Rafferty (IRL)	EF Education–EasyPost	+ 10"

== Stage 3 ==
10 May 2026 — Plovdiv (Bulgaria) to Sofia (Bulgaria), 175 km (109 mi)

Stage 3 Result
Rank	Rider	Team	Time
1	Paul Magnier (FRA)	Soudal–Quick-Step	4h 09' 42"
2	Jonathan Milan (ITA)	Lidl–Trek	+ 0"
3	Dylan Groenewegen (NED)	Unibet Rose Rockets	+ 0"
4	Madis Mihkels (EST)	EF Education–EasyPost	+ 0"
5	Matteo Malucelli (ITA)	XDS Astana Team	+ 0"
6	Erlend Blikra (NOR)	Uno-X Mobility	+ 0"
7	Pascal Ackermann (GER)	Team Jayco–AlUla	+ 0"
8	Davide Ballerini (ITA)	XDS Astana Team	+ 0"
9	Tobias Lund Andresen (DEN)	Decathlon CMA CGM	+ 0"
10	Enrico Zanoncello (ITA)	Bardiani–CSF 7 Saber	+ 0"

General classification after Stage 3
Rank	Rider	Team	Time
1	Guillermo Thomas Silva (URU)	XDS Astana Team	13h 10' 05"
2	Florian Stork (GER)	Tudor Pro Cycling Team	+ 4"
3	Egan Bernal (COL)	Netcompany INEOS	+ 4"
4	Thymen Arensman (NED)	Netcompany INEOS	+ 6"
5	Giulio Ciccone (ITA)	Lidl–Trek	+ 6"
6	Jan Christen (SUI)	UAE Team Emirates XRG	+ 10"
7	Martin Tjøtta (NOR)	Uno-X Mobility	+ 10"
8	Johannes Kulset (NOR)	Uno-X Mobility	+ 10"
9	Enric Mas (ESP)	Movistar Team	+ 10"
10	Lennert Van Eetvelt (BEL)	Lotto–Intermarché	+ 10"

== Rest day 1 ==
11 May 2026 — Sofia (Bulgaria)

== Stage 4 ==
12 May 2026 — Catanzaro to Cosenza, 138 km (86 mi)

Stage 4 Result
Rank	Rider	Team	Time
1	Jhonatan Narváez (ECU)	UAE Team Emirates XRG	3h 08' 46"
2	Orluis Aular (VEN)	Movistar Team	+ 0"
3	Giulio Ciccone (ITA)	Lidl–Trek	+ 0"
4	Ben Turner (GBR)	Netcompany INEOS	+ 0"
5	Alessandro Pinarello (ITA)	NSN Cycling Team	+ 0"
6	Afonso Eulálio (POR)	Team Bahrain Victorious	+ 0"
7	Lennert Van Eetvelt (BEL)	Lotto–Intermarché	+ 0"
8	Diego Ulissi (ITA)	XDS Astana Team	+ 0"
9	Andrea Raccagni Noviero (ITA)	Soudal–Quick-Step	+ 0"
10	Michael Valgren (DEN)	EF Education–EasyPost	+ 0"

General classification after Stage 4
Rank	Rider	Team	Time
1	Giulio Ciccone (ITA)	Lidl–Trek	16h 18' 51"
2	Jan Christen (SUI)	UAE Team Emirates XRG	+ 4"
3	Florian Stork (GER)	Tudor Pro Cycling Team	+ 4"
4	Egan Bernal (COL)	Netcompany INEOS	+ 4"
5	Thymen Arensman (NED)	Netcompany INEOS	+ 6"
6	Giulio Pellizzari (ITA)	Red Bull–Bora–Hansgrohe	+ 6"
7	Lennert Van Eetvelt (BEL)	Lotto–Intermarché	+ 10"
8	Enric Mas (ESP)	Movistar Team	+ 10"
9	Markel Beloki (ESP)	EF Education–EasyPost	+ 10"
10	Jan Hirt (CZE)	NSN Cycling Team	+ 10"

== Stage 5 ==
13 May 2026 — Praia a Mare to Potenza, 203 km (126 mi)

Stage 5 Result
Rank	Rider	Team	Time
1	Igor Arrieta (ESP)	UAE Team Emirates XRG	5h 07' 51"
2	Afonso Eulálio (POR)	Team Bahrain Victorious	+ 2"
3	Guillermo Thomas Silva (URU)	XDS Astana Team	+ 51"
4	Lorenzo Milesi (ITA)	Movistar Team	+ 1' 29"
5	Christian Scaroni (ITA)	XDS Astana Team	+ 1' 30"
6	Gianmarco Garofoli (ITA)	Soudal–Quick-Step	+ 1' 30"
7	Koen Bouwman (NED)	Team Jayco–AlUla	+ 3' 11"
8	Johannes Kulset (NOR)	Uno-X Mobility	+ 3' 13"
9	Andrea Raccagni Noviero (ITA)	Soudal–Quick-Step	+ 3' 29"
10	Ludovico Crescioli (ITA)	Team Polti VisitMalta	+ 4' 42"

General classification after Stage 5
Rank	Rider	Team	Time
1	Afonso Eulálio (POR)	Team Bahrain Victorious	21h 27' 43"
2	Igor Arrieta (ESP)	UAE Team Emirates XRG	+ 2' 51"
3	Christian Scaroni (ITA)	XDS Astana Team	+ 3' 34"
4	Andrea Raccagni Noviero (ITA)	Soudal–Quick-Step	+ 3' 39"
5	Johannes Kulset (NOR)	Uno-X Mobility	+ 5' 17"
6	Giulio Ciccone (ITA)	Lidl–Trek	+ 6' 12"
7	Jan Christen (SUI)	UAE Team Emirates XRG	+ 6' 16"
8	Florian Stork (GER)	Tudor Pro Cycling Team	+ 6' 16"
9	Egan Bernal (COL)	Netcompany INEOS	+ 6' 16"
10	Thymen Arensman (NED)	Netcompany INEOS	+ 6' 18"

== Stage 6 ==
14 May 2026 — Paestum to Naples, 142 km (88 mi)

Stage 6 Result
Rank	Rider	Team	Time
1	Davide Ballerini (ITA)	XDS Astana Team	3h 19' 30"
2	Jasper Stuyven (BEL)	Soudal–Quick-Step	+ 0"
3	Paul Magnier (FRA)	Soudal–Quick-Step	+ 0"
4	Jensen Plowright (AUS)	Alpecin–Premier Tech	+ 0"
5	Ben Turner (GBR)	Netcompany INEOS	+ 0"
6	Alec Segaert (BEL)	Team Bahrain Victorious	+ 0"
7	Luca Mozzato (ITA)	Tudor Pro Cycling Team	+ 0"
8	Filippo Magli (ITA)	Bardiani–CSF 7 Saber	+ 0"
9	Enrico Zanoncello (ITA)	Bardiani–CSF 7 Saber	+ 0"
10	Casper van Uden (NED)	Team Picnic–PostNL	+ 0"

General classification after Stage 6
Rank	Rider	Team	Time
1	Afonso Eulálio (POR)	Team Bahrain Victorious	24h 47' 13"
2	Igor Arrieta (ESP)	UAE Team Emirates XRG	+ 2' 51"
3	Christian Scaroni (ITA)	XDS Astana Team	+ 3' 34"
4	Andrea Raccagni Noviero (ITA)	Soudal–Quick-Step	+ 3' 39"
5	Johannes Kulset (NOR)	Uno-X Mobility	+ 5' 17"
6	Giulio Ciccone (ITA)	Lidl–Trek	+ 6' 12"
7	Jan Christen (SUI)	UAE Team Emirates XRG	+ 6' 16"
8	Florian Stork (GER)	Tudor Pro Cycling Team	+ 6' 16"
9	Egan Bernal (COL)	Netcompany INEOS	+ 6' 16"
10	Thymen Arensman (NED)	Netcompany INEOS	+ 6' 18"

== Stage 7 ==
15 May 2026 — Formia to Blockhaus, 244 km (152 mi)

Stage 7 Result
Rank	Rider	Team	Time
1	Jonas Vingegaard (DEN)	Visma–Lease a Bike	6h 09' 15"
2	Felix Gall (AUT)	Decathlon CMA CGM	+ 13"
3	Jai Hindley (AUS)	Red Bull–Bora–Hansgrohe	+ 1' 02"
4	Giulio Pellizzari (ITA)	Red Bull–Bora–Hansgrohe	+ 1' 05"
5	Ben O'Connor (AUS)	Team Jayco–AlUla	+ 1' 05"
6	Mathys Rondel (FRA)	Tudor Pro Cycling Team	+ 1' 29"
7	Giulio Ciccone (ITA)	Lidl–Trek	+ 1' 40"
8	Derek Gee-West (CAN)	Lidl–Trek	+ 1' 42"
9	Michael Storer (AUS)	Tudor Pro Cycling Team	+ 1' 44"
10	Thymen Arensman (NED)	Netcompany INEOS	+ 1' 44"

General classification after Stage 7
Rank	Rider	Team	Time
1	Afonso Eulálio (POR)	Team Bahrain Victorious	30h 59' 23"
2	Jonas Vingegaard (DEN)	Visma–Lease a Bike	+ 3' 17"
3	Felix Gall (AUT)	Decathlon CMA CGM	+ 3' 34"
4	Jai Hindley (AUS)	Red Bull–Bora–Hansgrohe	+ 4' 25"
5	Giulio Pellizzari (ITA)	Red Bull–Bora–Hansgrohe	+ 4' 28"
6	Ben O'Connor (AUS)	Team Jayco–AlUla	+ 4' 32"
7	Mathys Rondel (FRA)	Tudor Pro Cycling Team	+ 4' 56"
8	Giulio Ciccone (ITA)	Lidl–Trek	+ 4' 57"
9	Thymen Arensman (NED)	Netcompany INEOS	+ 5' 07"
10	Michael Storer (AUS)	Tudor Pro Cycling Team	+ 5' 11"

== Stage 8 ==
16 May 2026 — Chieti to Fermo, 156 km (97 mi)

Stage 8 Result
Rank	Rider	Team	Time
1	Jhonatan Narváez (ECU)	UAE Team Emirates XRG	3h 27' 26"
2	Andreas Leknessund (NOR)	Uno-X Mobility	+ 32"
3	Martin Tjøtta (NOR)	Uno-X Mobility	+ 42"
4	Guillermo Thomas Silva (URU)	XDS Astana Team	+ 44"
5	Lorenzo Milesi (ITA)	Movistar Team	+ 44"
6	Christian Scaroni (ITA)	XDS Astana Team	+ 48"
7	Corbin Strong (NZL)	NSN Cycling Team	+ 55"
8	Juan Pedro López (ESP)	Movistar Team	+ 55"
9	Wout Poels (NED)	Unibet Rose Rockets	+ 58"
10	Markel Beloki (ESP)	EF Education–EasyPost	+ 1' 00"

General classification after Stage 8
Rank	Rider	Team	Time
1	Afonso Eulálio (POR)	Team Bahrain Victorious	34h 28' 42"
2	Jonas Vingegaard (DEN)	Visma–Lease a Bike	+ 3' 15"
3	Felix Gall (AUT)	Decathlon CMA CGM	+ 3' 34"
4	Christian Scaroni (ITA)	XDS Astana Team	+ 4' 18"
5	Jai Hindley (AUS)	Red Bull–Bora–Hansgrohe	+ 4' 23"
6	Giulio Pellizzari (ITA)	Red Bull–Bora–Hansgrohe	+ 4' 28"
7	Ben O'Connor (AUS)	Team Jayco–AlUla	+ 4' 32"
8	Mathys Rondel (FRA)	Tudor Pro Cycling Team	+ 4' 56"
9	Thymen Arensman (NED)	Netcompany INEOS	+ 5' 07"
10	Michael Storer (AUS)	Tudor Pro Cycling Team	+ 5' 11"

== Stage 9 ==
17 May 2026 — Cervia to Corno alle Scale, 184 km (114 mi)

Stage 9 Result
Rank	Rider	Team	Time
1	Jonas Vingegaard (DEN)	Visma–Lease a Bike	4h 20' 21"
2	Felix Gall (AUT)	Decathlon CMA CGM	+ 12"
3	Davide Piganzoli (ITA)	Visma–Lease a Bike	+ 34"
4	Thymen Arensman (NED)	Netcompany INEOS	+ 34"
5	Afonso Eulálio (POR)	Team Bahrain Victorious	+ 41"
6	Derek Gee-West (CAN)	Lidl–Trek	+ 46"
7	Mathys Rondel (FRA)	Tudor Pro Cycling Team	+ 46"
8	Sepp Kuss (USA)	Visma–Lease a Bike	+ 46"
9	Jai Hindley (AUS)	Red Bull–Bora–Hansgrohe	+ 50"
10	Michael Storer (AUS)	Tudor Pro Cycling Team	+ 50"

General classification after Stage 9
Rank	Rider	Team	Time
1	Afonso Eulálio (POR)	Team Bahrain Victorious	38h 49' 44"
2	Jonas Vingegaard (DEN)	Visma–Lease a Bike	+ 2' 24"
3	Felix Gall (AUT)	Decathlon CMA CGM	+ 2' 59"
4	Jai Hindley (AUS)	Red Bull–Bora–Hansgrohe	+ 4' 32"
5	Christian Scaroni (ITA)	XDS Astana Team	+ 4' 43"
6	Thymen Arensman (NED)	Netcompany INEOS	+ 5' 00"
7	Mathys Rondel (FRA)	Tudor Pro Cycling Team	+ 5' 01"
8	Ben O'Connor (AUS)	Team Jayco–AlUla	+ 5' 03"
9	Giulio Pellizzari (ITA)	Red Bull–Bora–Hansgrohe	+ 5' 15"
10	Michael Storer (AUS)	Tudor Pro Cycling Team	+ 5' 20"

== Rest day 2 ==
18 May 2026 — Corno alle Scale

== Stage 10 ==
19 May 2026 — Viareggio to Massa, 42 km (26 mi) (ITT)

Stage 10 Result
Rank	Rider	Team	Time
1	Filippo Ganna (ITA)	Netcompany INEOS	45' 53"
2	Thymen Arensman (NED)	Netcompany INEOS	+ 1' 54"
3	Rémi Cavagna (FRA)	Groupama–FDJ United	+ 1' 59"
4	Sjoerd Bax (NED)	Pinarello–Q36.5 Pro Cycling Team	+ 2' 04"
5	Derek Gee-West (CAN)	Lidl–Trek	+ 2' 16"
6	Max Walscheid (GER)	Lidl–Trek	+ 2' 17"
7	Johan Price-Pejtersen (DEN)	Alpecin–Premier Tech	+ 2' 29"
8	Mikkel Bjerg (DEN)	UAE Team Emirates XRG	+ 2' 33"
9	Lorenzo Milesi (ITA)	Movistar Team	+ 2' 40"
10	Niklas Larsen (DEN)	Unibet Rose Rockets	+ 2' 42"

General classification after Stage 10
Rank	Rider	Team	Time
1	Afonso Eulálio (POR)	Team Bahrain Victorious	39h 40' 34"
2	Jonas Vingegaard (DEN)	Visma–Lease a Bike	+ 27"
3	Thymen Arensman (NED)	Netcompany INEOS	+ 1' 57"
4	Felix Gall (AUT)	Decathlon CMA CGM	+ 2' 24"
5	Ben O'Connor (AUS)	Team Jayco–AlUla	+ 2' 48"
6	Jai Hindley (AUS)	Red Bull–Bora–Hansgrohe	+ 3' 06"
7	Michael Storer (AUS)	Tudor Pro Cycling Team	+ 3' 28"
8	Derek Gee-West (CAN)	Lidl–Trek	+ 3' 34"
9	Giulio Pellizzari (ITA)	Red Bull–Bora–Hansgrohe	+ 3' 36"
10	Markel Beloki (ESP)	EF Education–EasyPost	+ 4' 16"

== Stage 11 ==
20 May 2026 — Porcari to Chiavari, 195 km (121 mi)

Stage 11 Result
Rank	Rider	Team	Time
1	Jhonatan Narváez (ECU)	UAE Team Emirates XRG	4h 33' 43"
2	Enric Mas (ESP)	Movistar Team	+ 0"
3	Diego Ulissi (ITA)	XDS Astana Team	+ 11"
4	Chris Harper (AUS)	Pinarello–Q36.5 Pro Cycling Team	+ 11"
5	Aleksandr Vlasov	Red Bull–Bora–Hansgrohe	+ 11"
6	Christian Scaroni (ITA)	XDS Astana Team	+ 1' 13"
7	Ludovico Crescioli (ITA)	Team Polti VisitMalta	+ 1' 15"
8	Simone Gualdi (ITA)	Lotto–Intermarché	+ 2' 17"
9	Warren Barguil (FRA)	Team Picnic–PostNL	+ 2' 19"
10	Andrea Raccagni Noviero (ITA)	Soudal–Quick-Step	+ 2' 19"

General classification after Stage 11
Rank	Rider	Team	Time
1	Afonso Eulálio (POR)	Team Bahrain Victorious	44h 17' 41"
2	Jonas Vingegaard (DEN)	Visma–Lease a Bike	+ 27"
3	Thymen Arensman (NED)	Netcompany INEOS	+ 1' 57"
4	Felix Gall (AUT)	Decathlon CMA CGM	+ 2' 24"
5	Ben O'Connor (AUS)	Team Jayco–AlUla	+ 2' 48"
6	Jai Hindley (AUS)	Red Bull–Bora–Hansgrohe	+ 3' 06"
7	Michael Storer (AUS)	Tudor Pro Cycling Team	+ 3' 28"
8	Derek Gee-West (CAN)	Lidl–Trek	+ 3' 34"
9	Giulio Pellizzari (ITA)	Red Bull–Bora–Hansgrohe	+ 3' 36"
10	Chris Harper (AUS)	Pinarello–Q36.5 Pro Cycling Team	+ 4' 09"
