= 2025 UCI Road World Championships – Men's road race =

Cycling event

Men's road race
2025 UCI Road World Championships

Race details
- Dates: 28 September 2025
- Distance: 267.5 km (166.2 mi)
- Winning time: 6h 21' 20"

Medalists
	Gold	(Slovenia) Tadej Pogačar (SLO)
	Silver	(Belgium) Remco Evenepoel (BEL)
	Bronze	(Republic of Ireland) Ben Healy (IRL)

The Men's road race of the 2025 UCI Road World Championships was a cycling event that took place on 28 September 2025 in Kigali, Rwanda. It was the 92nd edition of the championship, for which Tadej Pogačar of Slovenia was the defending champion, having won in 2024. Pogačar won the race for the second year in a row.

== Final classification ==
Rank	Position in the road race
Time	Time taken to complete the road race
DNS	Denotes a rider who did not start
DNF	Denotes a rider who did not finish
DSQ	Denotes a rider who was disqualified from the race
OTL	Denotes a rider who finished outside the time limit

Rank	Rider	Country	Time
1st place, gold medalist(s)	Tadej Pogačar	Slovenia	6h 21' 20"
2nd place, silver medalist(s)	Remco Evenepoel	Belgium	+ 1' 28"
3rd place, bronze medalist(s)	Ben Healy	Ireland	+ 2' 16"
4	Mattias Skjelmose	Denmark	+ 2' 53"
5	Toms Skujiņš	Latvia	+ 6' 41"
6	Giulio Ciccone	Italy	+ 6' 47"
7	Isaac del Toro	Mexico	s.t.
8	Juan Ayuso	Spain	s.t.
9	Afonso Eulálio	Portugal	+ 7' 06"
10	Tom Pidcock	Great Britain	+ 9' 05"
11	Primož Roglič	Slovenia	s.t.
12	Mikkel Frølich Honoré	Denmark	+ 9' 07"
13	Paul Seixas	France	s.t.
14	Harold Tejada	Colombia	s.t.
15	Pavel Sivakov	France	+ 9' 47"
16	Jai Hindley	Australia	+ 10' 01"
17	Andrea Bagioli	Italy	+ 10' 06"
18	Marc Hirschi	Switzerland	s.t.
19	Michael Storer	Australia	+ 10' 12"
20	Carlos Canal	Spain	s.t.
21	Bauke Mollema	Netherlands	s.t.
22	Gianmarco Garofoli	Italy	+ 10' 16"
23	Kevin Vermaerke	United States	s.t.
24	Artem Nych	Individual Neutral Athletes	s.t.
25	Andreas Leknessund	Norway	+ 10' 18"
26	Cian Uijtdebroeks	Belgium	s.t.
27	Embret Svestad-Bårdseng	Norway	+ 10' 48"
28	Valentin Paret-Peintre	France	+ 10' 59"
29	Jan Christen	Switzerland	+ 11' 55"
30	Amanuel Ghebreigzabhier	Eritrea	+ 12' 04"

Rank	Rider	Country	Time
	Thymen Arensman	Netherlands	DNF
	Richard Carapaz	Ecuador	DNF
	Louis Vervaeke	Belgium	DNF
	Jonathan Caicedo	Ecuador	DNF
	Jordan Jegat	France	DNF
	Johannes Staune-Mittet	Norway	DNF
	Attila Valter	Hungary	DNF
	Roger Adrià	Spain	DNF
	Anthon Charmig	Denmark	DNF
	Valentin Madouas	France	DNF
	Marco Frigo	Italy	DNF
	Xandro Meurisse	Belgium	DNF
	Fausto Masnada	Italy	DNF
	Mark Donovan	Great Britain	DNF
	Oscar Onley	Great Britain	DNF
	Fabian Weiss	Switzerland	DNF
	Abel Balderstone	Spain	DNF
	Wouter Poels	Netherlands	DNF
	Quinten Hermans	Belgium	DNF
	Victor Campenaerts	Belgium	DNF
	Jay Vine	Australia	DNF
	Mattia Cattaneo	Italy	DNF
	Michael Matthews	Australia	DNF
	Henok Mulubrhan	Eritrea	DNF
	Henrique Avancini	Brazil	DNF
	Lawrence Warbasse	United States	DNF
	Sergio Chumil	Guatemala	DNF
	Eder Frayre	Mexico	DNF
	Merhawi Kudus	Eritrea	DNF
	Frank van den Broek	Netherlands	DNF
	Michael Leonard	Canada	DNF
	Byron Munton	South Africa	DNF
	Ivo Oliveira	Portugal	DNF
	Edward Dunbar	Ireland	DNF
	Mauro Schmid	Switzerland	DNF
	Anders Foldager	Denmark	DNF
	Luka Mezgec	Slovenia	DNF
	Tiago Antunes	Portugal	DNF
	Julien Bernard	France	DNF
	Quinn Simmons	United States	DNF
	Domen Novak	Slovakia	DNF
	Egan Bernal	Colombia	DNF
	Christopher Jensen	Denmark	DNF
	Matej Mohorič	Slovenia	DNF
	Victor Langellotti	Monaco	DNF
	Nadav Raisberg	Israel	DNF
	Martin Svrček	Slovakia	DNF
	Casper Pedersen	Denmark	DNF
	Joseph Blackmore	Great Britain	DNF
	Sven Erik Bystrom	Norway	DNF
	Carlos Verona	Spain	DNF
	Raúl García Pierna	Spain	DNF
	Brandon Rivera	Colombia	DNF
	Natnael Tesfatsion	Eritrea	DNF
	Šimon Vaníček	Czech Republic	DNF
	Asbjørn Hellemose	Denmark	DNF
	Darren Rafferty	Ireland	DNF
	Michael Boroš	Czech Republic	DNF
	Shemu Nsengiyumva	Rwanda	DNF
	Fred Wright	Great Britain	DNF
	Menno Huising	Netherlands	DNF
	Harold Martín López	Ecuador	DNF
	Fabio Christen	Switzerland	DNF
	Marius Mayrhofer	Germany	DNF
	Florian Vermeersch	Belgium	DNF
	Biniam Girmay	Eritrea	DNF
	Damien Howson	Australia	DNF
	Walter Vargas	Colombia	DNF
	Gal Glivar	Slovenia	DNF
	Lorenzo Fortunato	Italy	DNF
	Matteo Sobrero	Italy	DNF
	Rory Townsend	Ireland	DNF
	Chris Hamilton	Australia	DNF
	James Knox	Great Britain	DNF
	Kristiāns Belohvoščiks	Latvia	DNF
	Charles Kagimu	Uganda	DNF
	Yuhi Todome	Japan	DNF
	António Morgado	Portugal	DNF
	Francisco Joel Peñuela	Venezuela	DNF
	Gabriel Rojas	Costa Rica	DNF
	Alexander Kamp	Denmark	DNF
	Rein Taaramäe	Estonia	DNF
	Nahom Zeray	Eritrea	DNF
	Luke Lamperti	United States	DNF
	Alexandre Mayer	Mauritius	DNF
	Callum Scotson	Australia	DNF
	Nikolaos Drakos	Greece	DNF
	Laurent Gervais	Canada	DNF
	Tegshbayar Batsaikhan	Mongolia	DNF
	Matevž Govekar	Slovenia	DNF
	Jaka Primožič	Slovenia	DNF
	Iván Romeo	Spain	DNF
	Mārtiņš Pluto	Latvia	DNF
	Peerapol Chawchiangkwang	Thailand	DNF
	David Ruvalcaba	Mexico	DNF
	Eric Manizabayo	Rwanda	DNF
	Oliver Knight	Great Britain	DNF
	Matic Žumer	Slovenia	DNF
	Jonas Rutsch	Germany	DNF
	Ryan Mullen	Ireland	DNF
	Georg Zimmermann	Germany	DNF
	Muradjan Khalmuratov	Uzbekistan	DNF
	Lucas Plapp	Australia	DNF
	Eric Muhoza	Rwanda	DNF
	Vainqueur Masengesho	Rwanda	DNF
	Franklin Archibold	Panama	DNF
	Felix Engelhardt	Germany	DNF
	Krists Neilands	Latvia	DNF
	Patrick Byukusenge	Rwanda	DNF
	William Barta	United States	DNF
	Eric Nkundabera	Rwanda	DNF
	Anatolii Budiak	Ukraine	DNF
	Louis Barré	France	DNF
	Edwin Kieya Ndungu	Kenya	DNF
	Briton John	Guyana	DNF
	Bjoern Koerdt	Great Britain	DNF
	Ilan Van Wilder	Belgium	DNF
	Mattew-Denis Piciu	Romania	DNF
	Marc Soler	Spain	DNF
	Ognjen Ilić	Serbia	DNF
	Ahmad Wais	Refugee Nation	DNF
	Slimane Badlis	Algeria	DNF
	Siriki Diarra	Mali	DNF
	Su Haoyu	China	DNF
	Jyven Gonzalez	Belize	DNF
	Ibrahim Jalloh	Sierra Leone	DNF
	Djandouba Diallo	Mali	DNF
	Red Walters	Grenada	DNF
	Mauro Alfredo	São Tomé and Príncipe	DNF
	Cheikhouna Cissé	Senegal	DNF
	Mustapha Koroma	Sierra Leone	DNF
	Julian Alaphilippe	France	DNF
	Ahmet Örken	Turkey	DNF
	Ediney do Rosario	São Tomé and Príncipe	DNF
	Sam Oomen	Netherlands	DNS
