= 2024 UCI Road World Championships – Men's road race =

Cycling race

Men's road race
2024 UCI Road World Championships
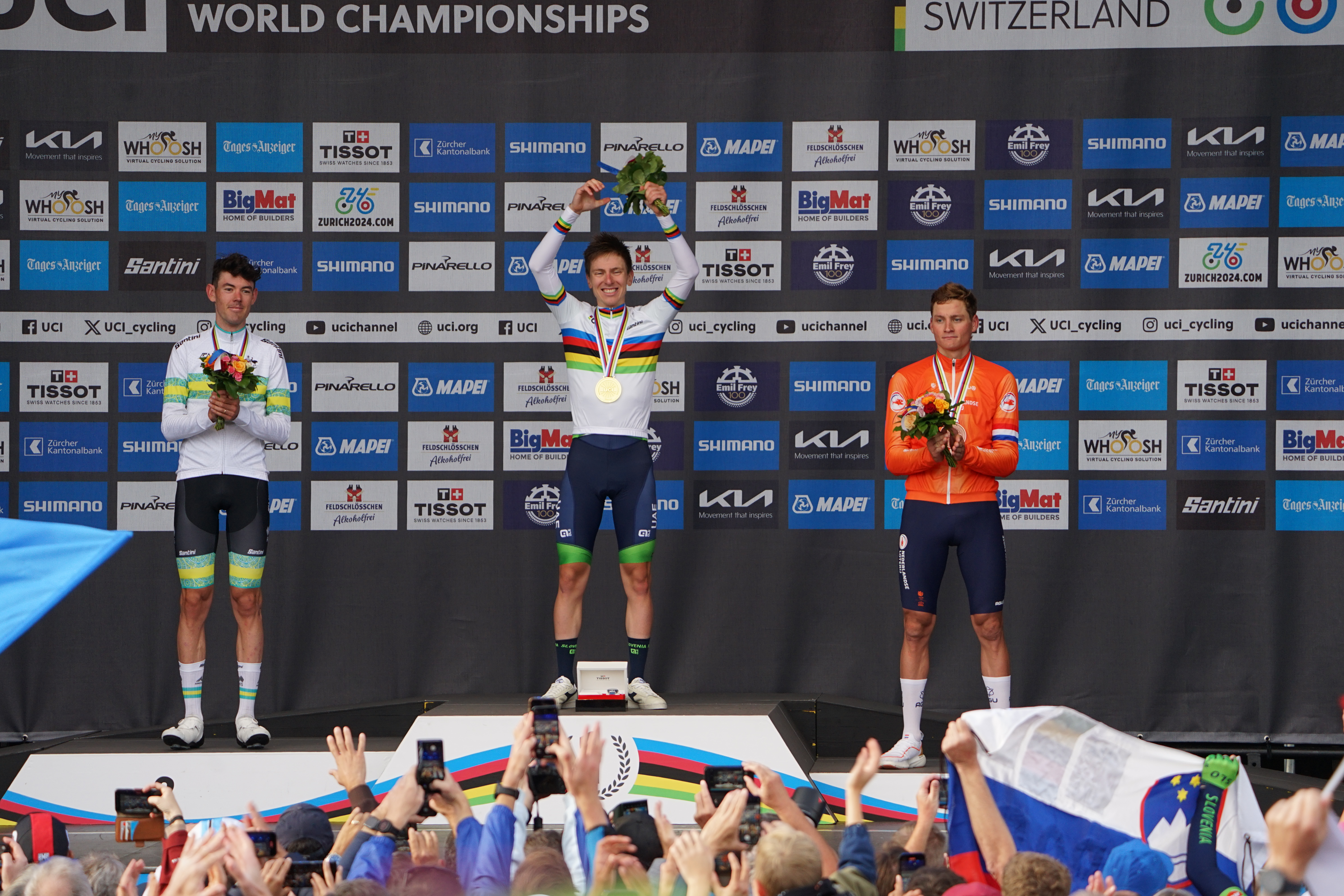
- The race podium

Race details
- Dates: 29 September 2024
- Stages: 1 in Zürich, Switzerland
- Winning time: 6h 27' 30"

Medalists
| | Gold | (Slovenia) Tadej Pogačar (SLO) |
| | Silver | (Australia) Ben O'Connor (AUS) |
| | Bronze | (Netherlands) Mathieu van der Poel (NED) |

The men's road race of the 2024 UCI Road World Championships was a cycling race that took place on 29 September 2024 in Zürich, Switzerland. It was won by Tadej Pogačar, who went on the attack 100km from the finish line.

Tadej Pogačar completed the rare Triple Crown of Cycling, winning the Giro d'Italia and the Tour de France before winning the Men's Road Race, and was only the third cyclist to achieve it following Eddy Merckx in 1974 and Stephen Roche in 1987.

== Qualification ==
Qualification was based mainly on the UCI World Ranking by nations as of 20 August 2024.

=== UCI World Rankings ===
The following nations qualified.

| Nations | Riders |
|---|---|
| Australia | 8 |
| Belgium | 8 |
| Denmark | 8 |
| France | 8 |
| Great Britain | 8 |
| Italy | 8 |
| Netherlands | 8 |
| Slovenia | 8 |
| Spain | 8 |
| United States | 8 |
| Austria | 6 |
| Colombia | 6 |
| Ecuador | 6 |
| Eritrea | 6 |
| Germany | 6 |
| New Zealand | 6 |
| Norway | 6 |
| Portugal | 6 |
| Switzerland | 6 |
| Neutral athletes of Russian sporting nationality | 6 |
| Canada | 4 |
| Czechia | 4 |
| Hungary | 4 |
| Ireland | 4 |
| Kazakhstan | 4 |
| Latvia | 4 |
| Luxembourg | 4 |
| Mexico | 4 |
| Poland | 4 |
| Venezuela | 4 |
| South Africa | 4 |
| Algeria | 1 |
| Brazil | 1 |
| China | 1 |
| Costa Rica | 1 |
| Cyprus | 1 |
| Estonia | 1 |
| Greece | 1 |
| Israel | 1 |
| Japan | 1 |
| Mauritius | 1 |
| Mongolia | 1 |
| Morocco | 1 |
| Panama | 1 |
| Slovakia | 1 |
| South Africa | 1 |
| Sweden | 1 |
| Thailand | 1 |
| Ukraine | 1 |
| Uruguay | 1 |

=== Continental champions ===
| Name | Country | Reason |
|---|---|---|
| Mathieu van der Poel | Netherlands | Incumbent World Champion |
| Leangel Linarez | Venezuela | Panamerican Champion |
| Kim Eu-ro | South Korea | Asian Champion |

== Final classification ==
| Rank | Rider | Country | Time |
|---|---|---|---|
| 1 | Tadej Pogačar | Slovenia | 6h 27' 30" |
| 2 | Ben O'Connor | Australia | + 34" |
| 3 | Mathieu van der Poel | Netherlands | + 58" |
| 4 | Toms Skujiņš | Latvia | + 58" |
| 5 | Remco Evenepoel | Belgium | + 58" |
| 6 | Marc Hirschi | Switzerland | + 58" |
| 7 | Ben Healy | Ireland | + 1' 00" |
| 8 | Enric Mas | Spain | + 1' 01" |
| 9 | Quinn Simmons | United States | + 2' 18" |
| 10 | Romain Bardet | France | + 2' 18" |
| 11 | Roger Adrià | Spain | + 2' 18" |
| 12 | Bauke Mollema | Netherlands | + 2' 18" |
| 13 | Mads Pedersen | Denmark | + 3' 52" |
| 14 | Markus Hoelgaard | Norway | + 3' 52" |
| 15 | Georg Zimmermann | Germany | + 3' 52" |
| 16 | Oscar Onley | Great Britain | + 3' 52" |
| 17 | Brandon McNulty | United States | + 3' 52" |
| 18 | Jai Hindley | Australia | + 3' 52" |
| 19 | Kevin Vermaerke | United States | + 3' 52" |
| 20 | Mathias Vacek | Czech Republic | + 3' 52" |
| 21 | Archie Ryan | Ireland | + 6' 04" |
| 22 | Valentin Madouas | France | + 6' 04" |
| 23 | Frederik Wandahl | Denmark | + 6' 04" |
| 24 | Magnus Cort | Denmark | + 6' 36" |
| 25 | Giulio Ciccone | Italy | + 6' 36" |
| 26 | Juan Ayuso | Spain | + 6' 36" |
| 27 | Attila Valter | Hungary | + 6' 36" |
| 28 | Florian Lipowitz | Germany | + 6' 36" |
| 29 | Felix Großschartner | Austria | + 6' 36" |
| 30 | Adam Yates | Great Britain | + 6' 36" |
| 31 | Wilco Kelderman | Netherlands | + 6' 36" |
| 32 | Aleksandr Vlasov | [[ at the UCI Road World Championships|]] | + 6' 36" |
| 33 | David Gaudu | France | + 6' 36" |
| 34 | Matteo Jorgenson | United States | + 6' 36" |
| 35 | Pavel Sivakov | France | + 6' 40" |
| 36 | Simon Geschke | Germany | + 7' 01" |
| 37 | Stefan Küng | Switzerland | + 7' 01" |
| 38 | Romain Grégoire | France | + 7' 01" |
| 39 | Neilson Powless | United States | + 12' 09" |
| 40 | Harold Tejada | Colombia | + 12' 09" |
| 41 | Tobias Halland Johannessen | Norway | + 12' 09" |
| 42 | Rui Costa | Portugal | + 12' 09" |
| 43 | Lorenzo Rota | Italy | + 12' 09" |
| 44 | Pier-André Côté | Canada | + 12' 09" |
| 45 | Edoardo Zambanini | Italy | + 12' 09" |
| 46 | Nick Schultz | Australia | + 12' 09" |
| 47 | Magnus Sheffield | United States | + 12' 09" |
| 48 | Diego Ulissi | Italy | + 12' 09" |
| 49 | Sam Oomen | Netherlands | + 12' 09" |
| 50 | Georg Steinhauser | Germany | + 12' 09" |
| 51 | Maxim Van Gils | Belgium | + 12' 09" |
| 52 | Mikkel Honoré | Denmark | + 12' 09" |
| 53 | Natnael Tesfatsion | Eritrea | + 12' 09" |
| 54 | Michael Woods | Canada | + 12' 09" |
| 55 | Nelson Oliveira | Portugal | + 12' 09" |
| 56 | Johannes Staune-Mittet | Norway | + 12' 09" |
| 57 | tom Pidcock | Great Britain | + 12' 09" |
| 58 | Alex Aranburu | Spain | + 12' 09" |
| 59 | Carlos Rodríguez | Spain | + 12' 09" |
| 60 | Daniel Martínez | Colombia | + 12' 09" |
| 61 | Rudy Molard | France | + 12' 09" |
| 62 | Pablo Castrillo | Spain | + 12' 09" |
| 63 | Mattia Cattaneo | Italy | + 12' 09" |
| 64 | Primož Roglič | Slovenia | + 12' 09" |
| 65 | Bob Jungels | Luxembourg | + 12' 09" |
| 66 | Filippo Zana | Italy | + 12' 09" |
| 67 | Eddie Dunbar | Ireland | + 12' 09" |
| 68 | Simon Yates | Great Britain | + 12' 09" |
| 69 | Antonio Tiberi | Italy | + 17' 39" |
| 70 | Lawrence Warbasse | United States | + 17' 39" |
| 71 | Krists Neilands | Latvia | + 17' 39" |
| 72 | Lukáš Kubiš | Slovakia | + 19' 23" |
| 73 | Reuben Thompson | New Zealand | + 19' 23" |
| 74 | Edgar Cadena | Mexico | + 19' 23" |
| 75 | Andreas Leknessund | Norway | + 19' 23" |
| 76 | Sebastian Schönberger | Austria | + 19' 23" |
| 77 | Lukasz Owsian | Poland | + 19' 23" |
| 78 | Márton Dina | Hungary | + 19' 23" |
| 79 | Einer Rubio | Colombia | + 19' 23" |
| 80 | Guillermo Thomas Silva | Uruguay | + 19' 23" |
| 81 | Eric Fagúndez | Uruguay | + 19' 23" |

| Rank | Rider | Country | Time |
|---|---|---|---|
| | Marco Brenner | Germany | DNF |
| | Michael Matthews | Australia | DNF |
| | Amanuel Ghebreigzabhier | Eritrea | DNF |
| | Bart Lemmen | Netherlands | DNF |
| | Piotr Pękala | Poland | DNF |
| | Luc Wirtgen | Luxembourg | DNF |
| | Silvan Dillier | Switzerland | DNF |
| | Frank van den Broek | Netherlands | DNF |
| | Michael Gogl | Austria | DNF |
| | Johan Jacobs | Switzerland | DNF |
| | Henok Mulubrhan | Eritrea | DNF |
| | Emanuel Zangerle | Austria | DNF |
| | Fabian Lienhard | Switzerland | DNF |
| | Marcin Budziński | Poland | DNF |
| | Michael Boroš | Czech Republic | DNF |
| | Ivo Oliveira | Portugal | DNF |
| | Tobias Bayer | Austria | DNF |
| | Nadav Raisberg | Israel | DNF |
| | Felix Gall | Austria | DNF |
| | Conn McDunphy | Ireland | DNF |
| | Kaden Hopkins | Bermuda | DNF |
| | Jan Tratnik | Slovenia | DNF |
| | Rui Oliveira | Portugal | DNF |
| | Tobias Foss | Norway | DNF |
| | Stephen Williams | Great Britain | DNF |
| | Laurens De Plus | Belgium | DNF |
| | Jay Vine | Australia | DNF |
| | Daan Hoole | Netherlands | DNF |
| | Julien Bernard | France | DNF |
| | Harry Sweeny | Australia | DNF |
| | Quinten Hermans | Belgium | DNF |
| | Mauro Schmid | Switzerland | DNF |
| | Tim Wellens | Belgium | DNF |
| | Tiesj Benoot | Belgium | DNF |
| | James Knox | Great Britain | DNF |
| | George Bennett | New Zealand | DNF |
| | Michael Storer | Australia | DNF |
| | Finn Fisher-Black | New Zealand | DNF |
| | Andrea Bagioli | Italy | DNF |
| | Victor Campenaerts | Belgium | DNF |
| | Andrea Mifsud | Malta | DNF |
| | Jaka Primožič | Slovenia | DNF |
| | Louis Meintjes | South Africa | DNF |
| | Michel Ries | Luxembourg | DNF |
| | Oscar Riesebeek | Netherlands | DNF |
| | Jasper Stuyven | Belgium | DNF |
| | Sjoerd Bax | Netherlands | DNF |
| | Kasper Asgreen | Denmark | DNF |
| | Jakob Fuglsang | Denmark | DNF |
| | Michael Valgren | Denmark | DNF |
| | Biniam Girmay | Eritrea | DNF |
| | Madis Mihkels | Estonia | DNF |
| | Lucas Eriksson | Sweden | DNF |
| | Kévin Geniets | Luxembourg | DNF |
| | Derek Gee | Canada | DNF |
| | Jefferson Alexander Cepeda | Ecuador | DNF |
| | Emīls Liepiņš | Latvia | DNF |
| | Chris Hamilton | Australia | DNF |
| | Yevgeniy Fedorov | Kazakhstan | DNF |
| | Gleb Brussenskiy | Kazakhstan | DNF |
| | Santiago Buitrago | Colombia | DNF |
| | Miguel Díaz | Mexico | DNF |
| | Periklis Ilias | Greece | DNF |
| | Iustin-Ioan Vaidian | Romania | DNF |
| | Domen Novak | Slovenia | DNF |
| | Pello Bilbao | Spain | DNF |
| | Matevž Govekar | Slovenia | DNF |
| | Jake Stewart | Great Britain | DNF |
| | Mark Donovan | Great Britain | DNF |
| | Afonso Eulálio | Portugal | DNF |
| | Maximilian Schachmann | Germany | DNF |
| | Victor Langellotti | Monaco | DNF |
| | Ulises Alfredo Castillo | Mexico | DNF |
| | Riley Sheehan | United States | DNF |
| | Francisco Joel Peñuela | Venezuela | DNF |
| | Eder Frayre | Mexico | DNF |
| | Roberto González | Panama | DNF |
| | Sergio Chumil | Guatemala | DNF |
| | Dawit Yemane | Eritrea | DNF |
| | Jonathan Caicedo | Ecuador | DNF |
| | Alexandre Mayer | Mauritius | DNF |
| | Xianjing Lyu | China | DNF |
| | Walter Vargas | Colombia | DNF |
| | Jonas Abrahamsen | Norway | DNF |
| | Callum Ormiston | South Africa | DNF |
| | Luka Mezgec | Slovenia | DNF |
| | Erik Fetter | Hungary | DNF |
| | Filip Maciejuk | Poland | DNF |
| | Jambaljamts Sainbayar | Mongolia | DNF |
| | Markus Pajur | Estonia | DNF |
| | Anton Kuzmin | Kazakhstan | DNF |
| | Alekss Krasts | Latvia | DNF |
| | Jakub Otruba | Czech Republic | DNF |
| | Michal Schlegel | Czech Republic | DNF |
| | Carlos Oyarzún | Chile | DNF |
| | Cory Williams | Belize | DNF |
| | Amir Arslan Ansari | Refugee Nation | DNF |
| | Fredd Matute | Honduras | DNF |
| | Rien Schuurhuis | Vatican City | DNF |
| | Ahmad Wais | Refugee Nation | DNF |
| | Matic Žumer | Slovenia | DNF |
| | Yukiya Arashiro | Japan | DNF |
| | Mattias Skjelmose | Denmark | DNF |
| | Anderson Timoteo Paredes | Venezuela | DNF |
| | Armando Reis Da Costa Camargo Filho | Brazil | DNF |
| | Mikel Landa | Spain | DNF |
| | Hamza Mansouri | Algeria | DNF |
| | Leangel Linarez | Venezuela | DNF |
| | Dmitriy Bocharov | Uzbekistan | DNF |
| | Julian Alaphilippe | France | DNF |
| | João Almeida | Portugal | DNF |
| | Igor Chzhan | Kazakhstan | DNF |
| | Tullatorn Sosalam | Thailand | DNF |
| | Fadhel Al Khater | Qatar | DNF |
| | Guillaume Boivin | Canada | DNS |
