= Andrea Mifsud =

Maltese cyclist

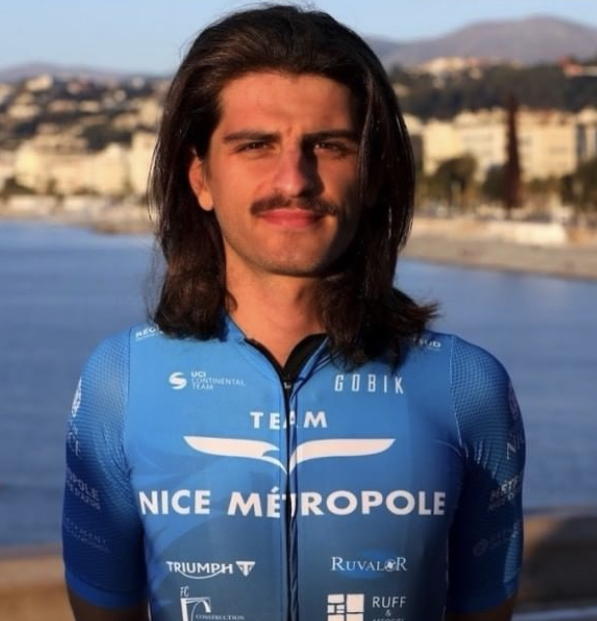

Personal information
- Born: 28 May 1999 (age 27) Grasse, France
- Height: 1.72 m (5 ft 8 in)
- Weight: 58 kg (128 lb)

Cycling career
- Sport: Cycling
- Current team: Team Polti VisitMalta
- Discipline: Road
- Role: Rider

Amateur teams
- 2016–2017: VC La Pomme Marseille U19
- 2018: VC La Pomme Marseille
- 2019–2020: CR4C Roanne

Professional teams
- 2021: Swiss Racing Academy
- 2022–2025: Nice Métropole Côte d'Azur
- 2026–: Team Polti VisitMalta

Andrea Mifsud (born 28 May 1999) is a French-born Maltese cyclist, who currently rides for UCI ProTeam Team Polti VisitMalta.

== Career ==
In 2024, Mifsud decided to compete for Malta, a country from which part of his family originates, allowing him to compete in the road race at the 2024 UCI Road World Championships. In 2026, he joined Team Polti VisitMalta and was selected for the Giro d'Italia, making him the first Maltese rider to enter a Grand Tour.

== Major results ==
2021
5th Road race, French National Under-23 Championships
2026
9th Visit South Aegean GP
10th Tour des Alpes-Maritimes

=== Grand Tour general classification results timeline ===
Grand Tour	2026
Giro d'Italia	69
Tour de France	—
Vuelta a España	—

Legend
—	Did not compete
DNF	Did not finish
