= Jardi van der Lee =

Dutch cyclist (born 2001)

- van der Lee in 2026

Personal information
- Full name: Jardi Christiaan van der Lee
- Born: 6 August 2001 (age 25) Schiedam, Netherlands
- Height: 1.85 m (6 ft 1 in)

Cycling career
- Sport: Cycling
- Current team: EF Education–EasyPost
- Disciplines: Road; Cyclo-cross
- Role: Rider
- Rider type: Climber

Amateur teams
- 2019: WV Westland Wil Vooruit
- 2019: WTC de Amstel
- 2020–2022: HSK Trias-Mooi Jong
- 2022–2023: Willebrord Wil Vooruit

Professional teams
- 2023: EF Education–EasyPost (stagiaire)
- 2024–: EF Education–EasyPost

Jardi Christiaan van der Lee (born 6 August 2001) is a Dutch cyclist who currently rides for UCI WorldTeam EF Education–EasyPost.

== Career ==
Although having no major achievements on the road, van der Lee caught the attention of UCI WorldTeam EF Education–EasyPost through his online results on Zwift, where he was ranked as one of the top in the world. Considered a strong climber, his first noticeable outdoor successes came via winning the Omloop van Simpelveld national race and a fourth-place finish at the Orlen Nations Grand Prix in 2023. He was recruited by the team to ride as a stagiaire in August 2023 and competed in the Tour de Langkawi, where he placed 13th overall. He joined the team full time the following season on a contract through 2025.

== Major results ==
2023
1st Omloop van Simpelveld
4th Overall Orlen Nations Grand Prix
2025
8th Trofeo Tessile & Moda
2026
9th Overall Settimana Internazionale di Coppi e Bartali

=== Grand Tour general classification results timeline ===
Grand Tour	2025	2026
Giro d'Italia	—	73
Tour de France	—	—
Vuelta a España	93	

Legend
—	Did not compete
DNF	Did not finish
