= 2026 Giro d'Italia =

Cycling competition

2026 UCI World Tour, race 22 of 36

Race details
- Dates: 8–31 May 2026
- Stages: 21
- Distance: 3,459.2 km (2,149.4 mi)

Results
Jersey awarded to the overall winner	Winner	Jonas Vingegaard (DEN)	(Visma–Lease a Bike)
	Second	Felix Gall (AUT)	(Decathlon CMA CGM)
	Third	Jai Hindley (AUS)	(Red Bull–Bora–Hansgrohe)
Jersey awarded to the points classification winner	Points	Paul Magnier (FRA)	(Soudal–Quick-Step)
Jersey awarded to the mountains classification winner	Mountains	Giulio Ciccone (ITA)	(Lidl–Trek)
Jersey awarded to the young rider classification winner	Young rider	Afonso Eulálio (POR)	(Team Bahrain Victorious)
	Sprints	Manuele Tarozzi (ITA)	(Bardiani–CSF 7 Saber)
Jersey awarded to the combativity classification winner	Combativity	Damiano Caruso (ITA)	(Team Bahrain Victorious)
	Team	(Netherlands) Visma–Lease a Bike	

The 2026 Giro d'Italia was the 109th edition of the Giro d'Italia, a three-week Grand Tour cycling stage race. The race started on 8 May in Nesebar, Bulgaria, and finished on 31 May in Rome.

The race was won by Danish rider Jonas Vingegaard of Visma–Lease a Bike for the first time, becoming the eighth rider to win all three Grand Tours and the first to do so since Chris Froome in 2018. Vingegaard took the lead on stage 14, before slowly extending his lead to nearly five and a half minutes. Vingegaard won 5 stages, 4 of them in the mountains.

Second overall was Austrian rider Felix Gall of Decathlon CMA CGM, with Australian rider Jai Hindley of Red Bull–Bora–Hansgrohe third overall. In the other classifications, French rider Paul Magnier of Soudal–Quick-Step won the points classification, Italian rider Giulio Ciccone of Lidl–Trek won the mountains classification, Portuguese rider Afonso Eulálio of Team Bahrain Victorious won the young rider classification and Italian rider Manuele Tarozzi of Bardiani–CSF 7 Saber won the sprints classification. The combativity award was won by Italian rider Damiano Caruso of Team Bahrain Victorious and the team classification was won by Visma–Lease a Bike.

The race was followed by the 2026 edition of the Giro d'Italia Women, which had moved position in the calendar so not to clash with the men's Tour de France.

== Teams and cyclists ==
Twenty-three teams participated in the race. All 18 UCI WorldTeams were automatically invited. They were joined by five UCI ProTeams.

Jonas Vingegaard (Visma–Lease a Bike) was considered to be the overall favourite to win the pink jersey. Other contenders for the podium and general classification included Jai Hindley and Giulio Pellizzari (Red Bull–Bora–Hansgrohe), Egan Bernal (Netcompany INEOS), and Adam Yates (UAE Team Emirates XRG).

UCI WorldTeams

- Alpecin–Premier Tech
- Decathlon CMA CGM
- EF Education–EasyPost
- Groupama–FDJ United
- Lidl–Trek
- Lotto–Intermarché
- Movistar Team
- Netcompany INEOS
- NSN Cycling Team
- Red Bull–Bora–Hansgrohe
- Soudal–Quick-Step
- Team Bahrain Victorious
- Team Jayco–AlUla
- Team Picnic–PostNL
- Visma–Lease a Bike
- UAE Team Emirates XRG
- Uno-X Mobility
- XDS Astana Team

UCI ProTeams

- Bardiani–CSF 7 Saber
- Pinarello–Q36.5 Pro Cycling Team
- Team Polti VisitMalta
- Tudor Pro Cycling Team
- Unibet Rose Rockets

== Route and stages ==
The official route was announced on 1 December 2025, with the first three stages taking place in Bulgaria, and stage 16 taking place wholly in Switzerland.

Stage characteristics and winners
Stage	Date	Course	Distance	Type	Winner
1	8 May	Nesebar (Bulgaria) to Burgas (Bulgaria)	147 km (91 mi)	Flat stage	Paul Magnier (FRA)
2	9 May	Burgas (Bulgaria) to Veliko Tarnovo (Bulgaria)	221 km (137 mi)	Hilly stage	Guillermo Thomas Silva (URU)
3	10 May	Plovdiv (Bulgaria) to Sofia (Bulgaria)	175 km (109 mi)	Flat stage	Paul Magnier (FRA)
	11 May	Rest day			
4	12 May	Catanzaro to Cosenza	138 km (86 mi)	Flat stage	Jhonatan Narváez (ECU)
5	13 May	Praia a Mare to Potenza	203 km (126 mi)	Hilly stage	Igor Arrieta (ESP)
6	14 May	Paestum to Naples	142 km (88 mi)	Flat stage	Davide Ballerini (ITA)
7	15 May	Formia to Blockhaus	244 km (152 mi)	Mountain stage	Jonas Vingegaard (DEN)
8	16 May	Chieti to Fermo	156 km (97 mi)	Hilly stage	Jhonatan Narváez (ECU)
9	17 May	Cervia to Corno alle Scale	184 km (114 mi)	Hilly stage	Jonas Vingegaard (DEN)
	18 May	Rest day			
10	19 May	Viareggio to Massa	42 km (26 mi)	Individual time trial	Filippo Ganna (ITA)
11	20 May	Porcari to Chiavari	195 km (121 mi)	Hilly stage	Jhonatan Narváez (ECU)
12	21 May	Imperia to Novi Ligure	175 km (109 mi)	Flat stage	Alec Segaert (BEL)
13	22 May	Alessandria to Verbania	189 km (117 mi)	Hilly stage	Alberto Bettiol (ITA)
14	23 May	Aosta to Pila	133 km (83 mi)	Mountain stage	Jonas Vingegaard (DEN)
15	24 May	Voghera to Milan	157 km (98 mi)	Flat stage	Fredrik Dversnes (NOR)
	25 May	Rest day			
16	26 May	Bellinzona (Switzerland) to Carì (Switzerland)	113 km (70 mi)	Mountain stage	Jonas Vingegaard (DEN)
17	27 May	Cassano d'Adda to Andalo	202 km (126 mi)	Hilly stage	Michael Valgren (DEN)
18	28 May	Fai della Paganella to Pieve di Soligo	171 km (106 mi)	Flat stage	Paul Magnier (FRA)
19	29 May	Feltre to Alleghe	151 km (94 mi)	Mountain stage	Sepp Kuss (USA)
20	30 May	Gemona del Friuli to Piancavallo	200 km (120 mi)	Mountain stage	Jonas Vingegaard (DEN)
21	31 May	Rome to Rome	131 km (81 mi)	Flat stage	Jonathan Milan (ITA)
Total			3,459.2 km (2,149.4 mi)		

== Classification leadership ==
Classification leadership by stage
Stage	Winner	General classification	Points classification	Mountains classification	Young rider classification	General Super Team	Intermediate sprint classification	Red Bull KM classification	Combativity award	Breakaway classification
1	Paul Magnier	Paul Magnier	Paul Magnier (Note: On stage 2, Tobias Lund Andresen, who was second in the points classification, wore the cyclamen jersey, because first-placed Paul Magnier wore the pink jersey as the leader of the general classification.)	Diego Pablo Sevilla	Paul Magnier (Note: On stage 2, António Morgado, who was third in the young rider classification, wore the white jersey, because first-placed Paul Magnier wore the pink jersey as the leader of the general classification and second-placed Tobias Lund Andresen wore the cyclamen jersey.)	Soudal–Quick-Step	Manuele Tarozzi	Manuele Tarozzi	Manuele Tarozzi	Manuele Tarozzi
2	Guillermo Thomas Silva	Guillermo Thomas Silva	Paul Magnier	Diego Pablo Sevilla	Guillermo Thomas Silva (Note: On stages 3 and 4, Jan Christen, who was second in the young rider classification, wore the white jersey, because first-placed Guillermo Thomas Silva wore the pink jersey as the leader of the general classification.)	XDS Astana Team	Diego Pablo Sevilla	Egan Bernal	Jonas Vingegaard	Diego Pablo Sevilla
3	Paul Magnier	Guillermo Thomas Silva	Paul Magnier	Diego Pablo Sevilla	Guillermo Thomas Silva	XDS Astana Team	Diego Pablo Sevilla	Manuele Tarozzi	Diego Pablo Sevilla	Diego Pablo Sevilla
4	Jhonatan Narváez	Giulio Ciccone	Paul Magnier	Diego Pablo Sevilla	Jan Christen	EF Education–EasyPost	Diego Pablo Sevilla	Manuele Tarozzi	Jan Christen	Diego Pablo Sevilla
5	Igor Arrieta	Afonso Eulálio	Paul Magnier	Diego Pablo Sevilla	Afonso Eulálio (Note: On stages 6 and 7, Igor Arrieta, who was second in the young rider classification, wore the white jersey, because first-placed Afonso Eulálio wore the pink jersey as the leader of the general classification. On stages 8–9, and 11–14, Giulio Pellizzari wore the white jersey for the same reason. On stage 10, Mathys Rondel wore the white jersey for the same reason.)	XDS Astana Team	Manuele Tarozzi	Manuele Tarozzi	Igor Arrieta	Diego Pablo Sevilla
6	Davide Ballerini	Afonso Eulálio	Paul Magnier	Diego Pablo Sevilla	Afonso Eulálio	XDS Astana Team	Manuele Tarozzi	Manuele Tarozzi	Alec Segaert	Diego Pablo Sevilla
7	Jonas Vingegaard	Afonso Eulálio	Paul Magnier	Jonas Vingegaard (Note: On stages 15 and 16, Jardi Christiaan van der Lee, who was second in the mountains classification, wore the blue jersey, because first-placed Jonas Vingegaard wore the pink jersey as the leader of the general classification. On stages 17–19, Giulio Ciccone wore the jersey for the same reason.)	Afonso Eulálio	Red Bull–Bora–Hansgrohe	Manuele Tarozzi	Manuele Tarozzi	Jonathan Milan	Diego Pablo Sevilla
8	Jhonatan Narváez	Afonso Eulálio	Paul Magnier	Jonas Vingegaard	Afonso Eulálio	Red Bull–Bora–Hansgrohe	Manuele Tarozzi	Manuele Tarozzi	Mikkel Bjerg	Diego Pablo Sevilla
9	Jonas Vingegaard	Afonso Eulálio	Paul Magnier	Jonas Vingegaard	Afonso Eulálio	Visma–Lease a Bike	Manuele Tarozzi	Manuele Tarozzi	Giulio Ciccone	Diego Pablo Sevilla
10	Filippo Ganna	Afonso Eulálio	Paul Magnier	Jonas Vingegaard	Afonso Eulálio	Visma–Lease a Bike	Manuele Tarozzi	Manuele Tarozzi	not awarded	Diego Pablo Sevilla
11	Jhonatan Narváez	Afonso Eulálio	Paul Magnier	Jonas Vingegaard	Afonso Eulálio	Red Bull–Bora–Hansgrohe	Manuele Tarozzi	Manuele Tarozzi	Enric Mas	Diego Pablo Sevilla
12	Alec Segaert	Afonso Eulálio	Paul Magnier	Jonas Vingegaard	Afonso Eulálio	Red Bull–Bora–Hansgrohe	Manuele Tarozzi	Afonso Eulálio	Alec Segaert	Diego Pablo Sevilla
13	Alberto Bettiol	Afonso Eulálio	Paul Magnier	Jonas Vingegaard	Afonso Eulálio	XDS Astana Team	Manuele Tarozzi	Afonso Eulálio	Alberto Bettiol	Diego Pablo Sevilla
14	Jonas Vingegaard	Jonas Vingegaard	Jhonatan Narváez	Jonas Vingegaard	Afonso Eulálio	Visma–Lease a Bike	Manuele Tarozzi	Afonso Eulálio	Davide Piganzoli	Diego Pablo Sevilla
15	Fredrik Dversnes	Jonas Vingegaard	Paul Magnier	Jonas Vingegaard	Afonso Eulálio	Visma–Lease a Bike	Manuele Tarozzi	Manuele Tarozzi	Mattia Bais	Diego Pablo Sevilla
16	Jonas Vingegaard	Jonas Vingegaard	Paul Magnier	Jonas Vingegaard	Afonso Eulálio	Visma–Lease a Bike	Manuele Tarozzi	Manuele Tarozzi	Giulio Ciccone	Diego Pablo Sevilla
17	Michael Valgren	Jonas Vingegaard	Jhonatan Narváez	Jonas Vingegaard	Afonso Eulálio	Visma–Lease a Bike	Manuele Tarozzi	Einer Rubio	Damiano Caruso	Diego Pablo Sevilla
18	Paul Magnier	Jonas Vingegaard	Paul Magnier	Jonas Vingegaard	Afonso Eulálio	Visma–Lease a Bike	Manuele Tarozzi	Einer Rubio	Afonso Eulálio	Diego Pablo Sevilla
19	Sepp Kuss	Jonas Vingegaard	Paul Magnier	Giulio Ciccone	Afonso Eulálio	Visma–Lease a Bike	Manuele Tarozzi	Einer Rubio	Giulio Ciccone	Diego Pablo Sevilla
20	Jonas Vingegaard	Jonas Vingegaard	Paul Magnier	Giulio Ciccone	Afonso Eulálio	Visma–Lease a Bike	Manuele Tarozzi	Igor Arrieta	Egan Bernal	Diego Pablo Sevilla
21	Jonathan Milan	Jonas Vingegaard	Paul Magnier	Giulio Ciccone	Afonso Eulálio	Visma–Lease a Bike	Manuele Tarozzi	Igor Arrieta	Filippo Ganna	Diego Pablo Sevilla
Final		Jonas Vingegaard	Paul Magnier	Giulio Ciccone	Afonso Eulálio	Visma–Lease a Bike	Manuele Tarozzi	Igor Arrieta	Damiano Caruso	Diego Pablo Sevilla

== Classification standings ==
Legend
Denotes the leader of the general classification	Denotes the leader of the mountains classification
Denotes the leader of the points classification	Denotes the leader of the young rider classification
Denotes the winner of the combativity award	

=== General classification ===
Final general classification (1–10)
Rank	Rider	Team	Time
1	Jonas Vingegaard (DEN)	Visma–Lease a Bike	83h 22' 51"
2	Felix Gall (AUT)	Decathlon CMA CGM	+ 5' 22"
3	Jai Hindley (AUS)	Red Bull–Bora–Hansgrohe	+ 6' 25"
4	Thymen Arensman (NED)	Netcompany INEOS	+ 7' 02"
5	Derek Gee-West (CAN)	Lidl–Trek	+ 7' 56"
6	Afonso Eulálio (POR)	Team Bahrain Victorious	+ 9' 39"
7	Michael Storer (AUS)	Tudor Pro Cycling Team	+ 10' 13"
8	Davide Piganzoli (ITA)	Visma–Lease a Bike	+ 10' 52"
9	Damiano Caruso (ITA)	Team Bahrain Victorious	+ 11' 24"
10	Egan Bernal (COL)	Netcompany INEOS	+ 12' 54"

=== Points classification ===
Final points classification (1–10)
Rank	Rider	Team	Points
1	Paul Magnier (FRA)	Soudal–Quick-Step	200
2	Jonathan Milan (ITA)	Lidl–Trek	153
3	Guillermo Thomas Silva (URU)	XDS Astana Team	99
4	Andreas Leknessund (NOR)	Uno-X Mobility	87
5	Jonas Vingegaard (DEN)	Visma–Lease a Bike	81
6	Jasper Stuyven (BEL)	Soudal–Quick-Step	75
7	Mattia Bais (ITA)	Team Polti VisitMalta	74
8	Giulio Ciccone (ITA)	Lidl–Trek	69
9	Felix Gall (AUT)	Decathlon CMA CGM	67
10	Manuele Tarozzi (ITA)	Bardiani–CSF 7 Saber	66

=== Mountains classification ===
Final mountains classification (1–10)
Rank	Rider	Team	Points
1	Giulio Ciccone (ITA)	Lidl–Trek	277
2	Jonas Vingegaard (DEN)	Visma–Lease a Bike	266
3	Einer Rubio (COL)	Movistar Team	164
4	Felix Gall (AUT)	Decathlon CMA CGM	124
5	Jardi Christiaan van der Lee (NED)	EF Education–EasyPost	108
6	Jai Hindley (AUS)	Red Bull–Bora–Hansgrohe	65
7	Diego Pablo Sevilla (ESP)	Team Polti VisitMalta	63
8	Igor Arrieta (ESP)	UAE Team Emirates XRG	55
9	Derek Gee-West (CAN)	Lidl–Trek	54
10	Jack Haig (AUS)	Netcompany INEOS	40

=== Young rider classification ===
Final young rider classification (1–10)
Rank	Rider	Team	Time
1	Afonso Eulálio (POR)	Team Bahrain Victorious	83h 32' 30"
2	Davide Piganzoli (ITA)	Visma–Lease a Bike	+ 1' 13"
3	Mathys Rondel (FRA)	Tudor Pro Cycling Team	+ 5' 33"
4	Johannes Kulset (NOR)	Uno-X Mobility	+ 24' 47"
5	Igor Arrieta (ESP)	UAE Team Emirates XRG	+ 46' 11"
6	Giulio Pellizzari (ITA)	Red Bull–Bora–Hansgrohe	+ 48' 37"
7	Embret Svestad-Bårdseng (NOR)	Netcompany INEOS	+ 1h 04' 00"
8	Ludovico Crescioli (ITA)	Team Polti VisitMalta	+ 1h 13' 18"
9	Gianmarco Garofoli (ITA)	Soudal–Quick-Step	+ 1h 29' 24"
10	Johannes Staune-Mittet (NOR)	Decathlon CMA CGM	+ 1h 44' 42"

=== Team classification ===
Final team classification (1–10)
Rank	Team	Time
1	(Netherlands) Visma–Lease a Bike	250h 42' 41"
2	(United Kingdom) Netcompany INEOS	+ 40' 07"
3	(Germany) Red Bull–Bora–Hansgrohe	+ 48' 27"
4	(Switzerland) Tudor Pro Cycling Team	+ 1h 04' 27"
5	(France) Decathlon CMA CGM	+ 1h 24' 59"
6	(Switzerland) Pinarello–Q36.5 Pro Cycling Team	+ 1h 56' 18"
7	Team Bahrain Victorious	+ 2h 13' 32"
8	(Germany) Lidl–Trek	+ 3h 03' 21"
9	(Spain) Movistar Team	+ 3h 05' 08"
10	(Australia) Team Jayco–AlUla	+ 3h 23' 49"

=== Intermediate sprint classification ===
Final intermediate sprint classification (1–10)
Rank	Rider	Team	Points
1	Manuele Tarozzi (ITA)	Bardiani–CSF 7 Saber	66
2	Mattia Bais (ITA)	Team Polti VisitMalta	56
3	Diego Pablo Sevilla (ESP)	Team Polti VisitMalta	48
4	Andreas Leknessund (NOR)	Uno-X Mobility	29
5	Martin Marcellusi (ITA)	Bardiani–CSF 7 Saber	28
6	Jonathan Milan (ITA)	Lidl–Trek	23
7	Einer Rubio (COL)	Movistar Team	20
8	Mirco Maestri (ITA)	Team Polti VisitMalta	20
9	Giulio Ciccone (ITA)	Lidl–Trek	19
10	Jonas Geens (BEL)	Alpecin–Premier Tech	19

=== Red Bull KM classification ===
Final Red Bull KM classification (1–10)
Rank	Rider	Team	Points
1	Igor Arrieta (ESP)	UAE Team Emirates XRG	53
2	Einer Rubio (COL)	Movistar Team	39
3	Manuele Tarozzi (ITA)	Bardiani–CSF 7 Saber	31
4	Afonso Eulálio (POR)	Team Bahrain Victorious	30
5	Filippo Magli (ITA)	Bardiani–CSF 7 Saber	23
6	Diego Pablo Sevilla (ESP)	Team Polti VisitMalta	22
7	Mikkel Bjerg (DEN)	UAE Team Emirates XRG	20
8	Chris Harper (AUS)	Pinarello–Q36.5 Pro Cycling Team	18
9	Giulio Ciccone (ITA)	Lidl–Trek	16
10	Jan Christen (SUI)	UAE Team Emirates XRG	16

=== Breakaway classification ===
Final breakaway classification (1–10)
Rank	Rider	Team	Kilometers
1	Diego Pablo Sevilla (ESP)	Team Polti VisitMalta	753
2	Mattia Bais (ITA)	Team Polti VisitMalta	628
3	Manuele Tarozzi (ITA)	Bardiani–CSF 7 Saber	554
4	Jonas Geens (BEL)	Alpecin–Premier Tech	404
5	Martin Marcellusi (ITA)	Bardiani–CSF 7 Saber	403
6	Jardi Christiaan van der Lee (NED)	EF Education–EasyPost	350
7	Mirco Maestri (ITA)	Team Polti VisitMalta	347
8	Andreas Leknessund (NOR)	Uno-X Mobility	329
9	Tim Naberman (NED)	Team Picnic–PostNL	310
10	Einer Rubio (COL)	Movistar Team	276

Preceded by 2025 Vuelta a España	Grand Tour	Succeeded by 2026 Tour de France
