= Ben O'Connor (cyclist) =

Australian cyclist (born 1995)

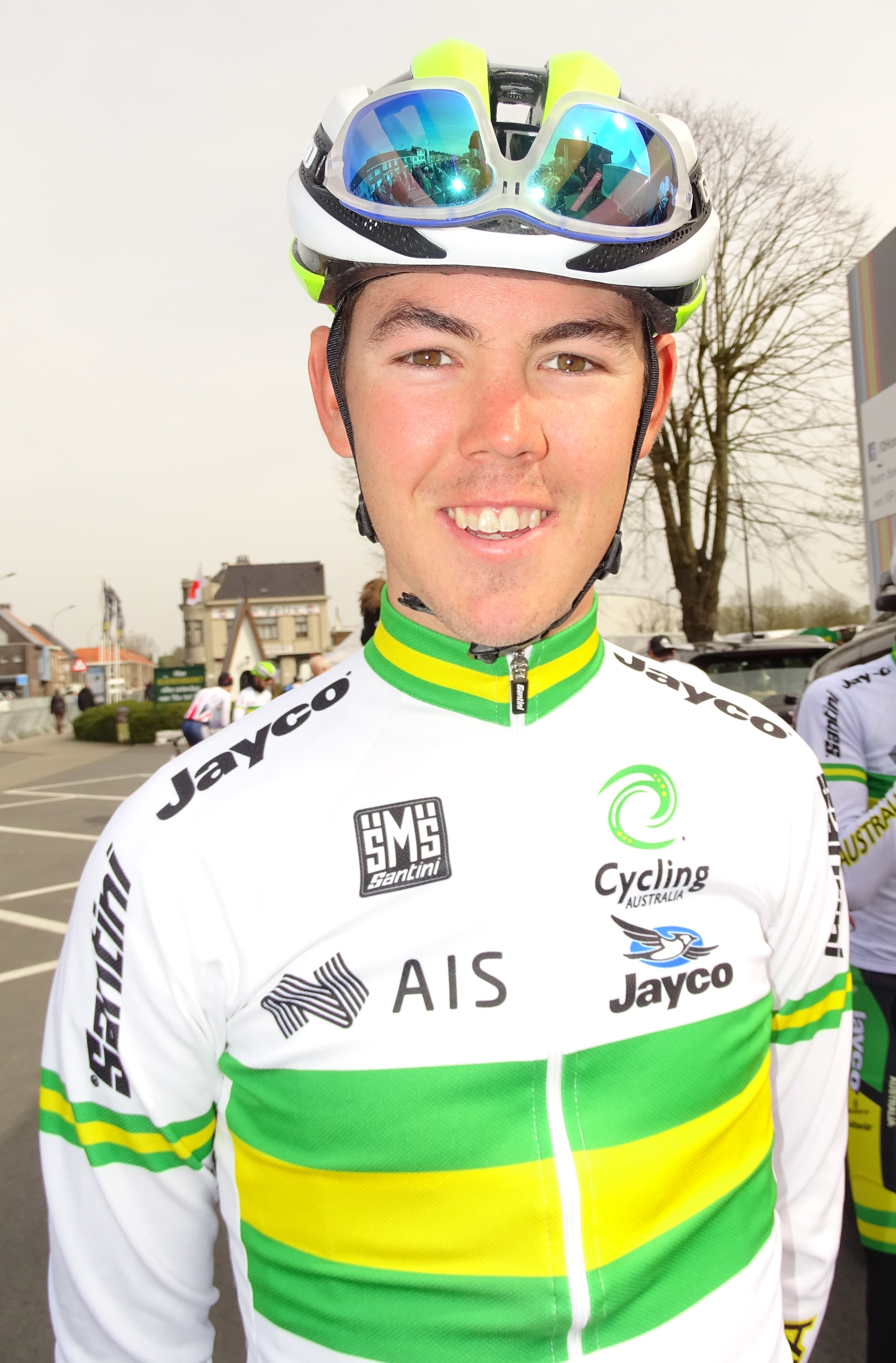
- O'Connor in 2016

Personal information
- Full name: Ben Alexander O'Connor
- Nickname: SuperBOC
- Born: 25 November 1995 (age 30) Subiaco, Western Australia, Australia
- Height: 1.88 m (6 ft 2 in)
- Weight: 67 kg (148 lb)

Cycling career
- Sport: Cycling
- Current team: Team Jayco–AlUla
- Discipline: Road
- Role: Rider
- Rider type: Climber

Professional teams
- 2015: Navitas-Satalyst Racing Team
- 2016: Avanti IsoWhey Sports
- 2017–2020: Team Dimension Data
- 2021–2024: AG2R Citroën Team
- 2025–: Team Jayco–AlUla

Major wins
- Grand Tours Tour de France 2 individual stages (2021, 2025) Giro d'Italia 1 individual stage (2020) Vuelta a España 1 individual stage (2024)
Medal record
Men's road bicycle racing
Representing Australia
World Championships
Gold medal – first place	2024 Zurich	Team relay
Silver medal – second place	2024 Zurich	Road race

Ben Alexander O'Connor (born 25 November 1995) is an Australian road cyclist, who currently rides for UCI WorldTeam Team Jayco–AlUla.

== Cycling career ==
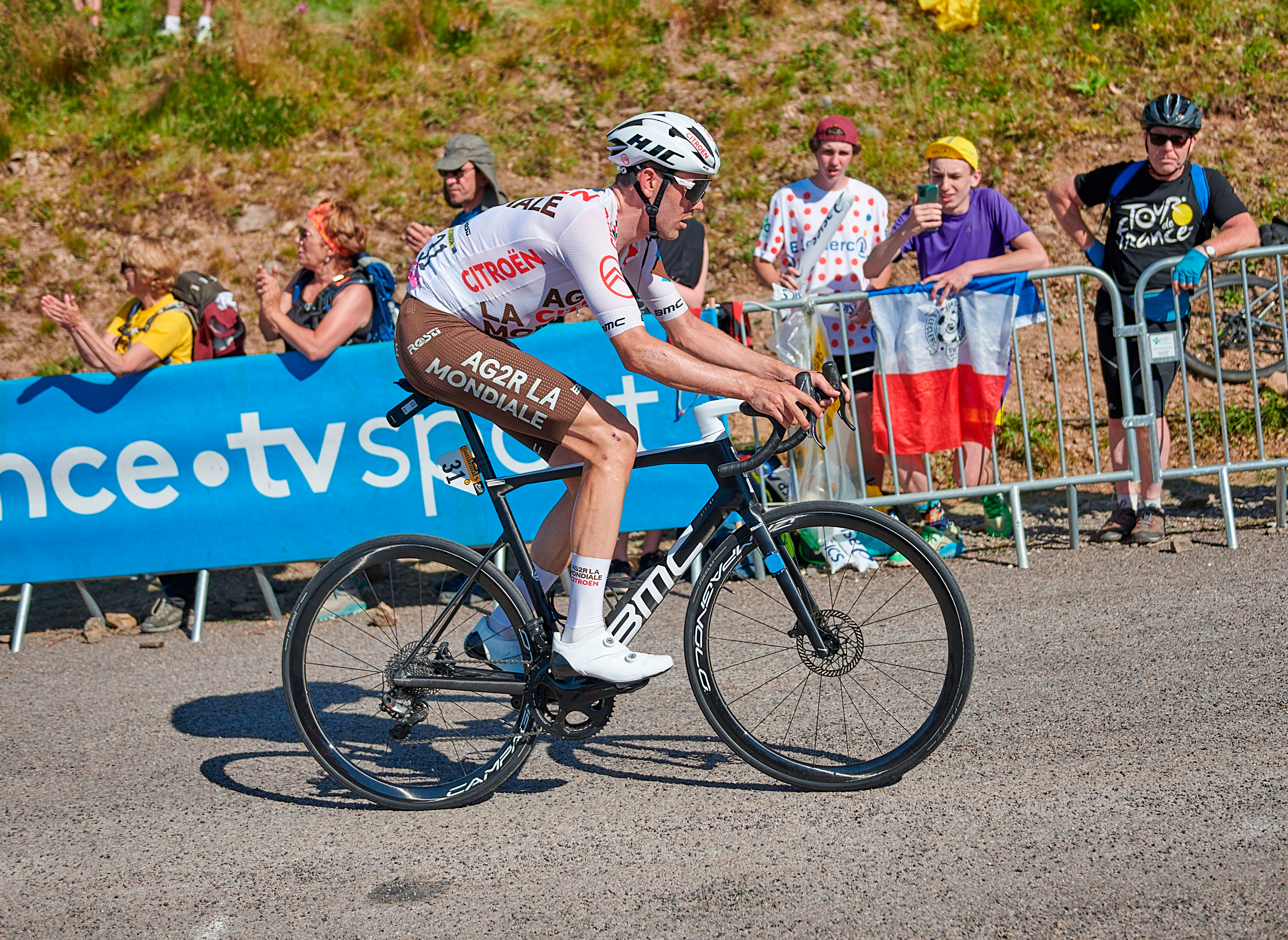
O'Connor at the 2022 Tour de France

In May 2018, he was named in the startlist for the 2018 Giro d'Italia. He was in 12th place on the general classification at the start of stage 19 but crashed during the stage breaking his collarbone. He then withdrew from the race.

In 2019 he completed two Grand Tours, the Giro d'Italia and the Vuelta a España.

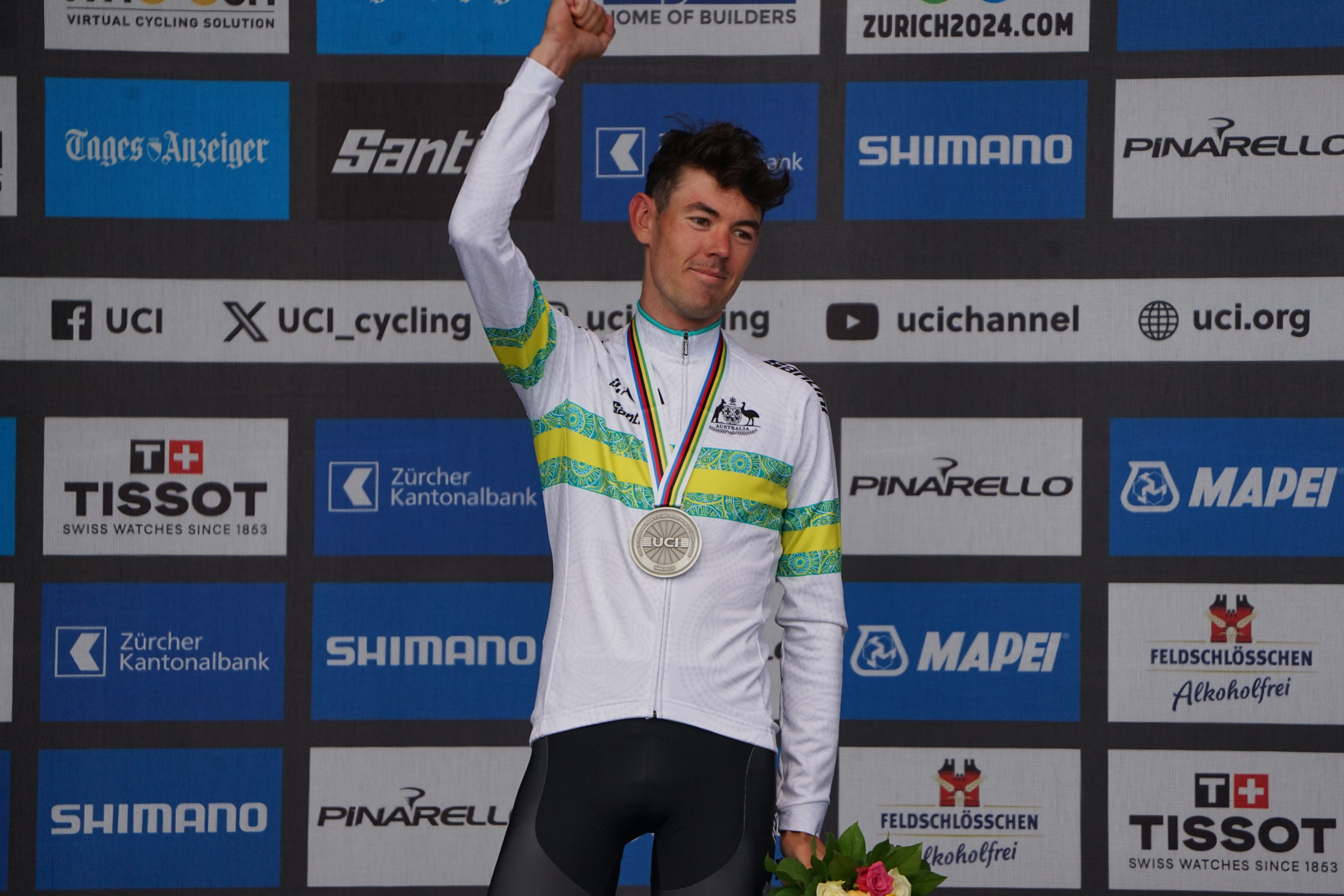
O'Connor winning silver at the 2024 UCI Road World Championships

O'Connor started the 2020 Giro d'Italia. He achieved his first Grand Tour stage win on stage 17 after finishing second on stage 16 the day before. In October 2020, O'Connor signed a contract to join the AG2R Citroën Team for the 2021 season.

O'Connor won stage nine of the 2021 Tour de France after getting in the breakaway and then riding solo for the last seventeen kilometres of the mountain stage. His victory elevated him to second in the general classification at the end of the stage. He finished the Tour in fourth place overall.

In 2024, O’Connor won stage six of that year's edition of the Vuelta a España after going on a solo breakaway. His victory gave him a stage win in all three grand tours, and the opportunity to wear the red jersey as he took over a four-minute lead over the rest of the peloton. He wore the red jersey until stage 19 of the race, when he lost the lead to 3-time champion Primoz Roglic, but defended his second place in the podium until the end of the competition for his best ever result in a Grand Tour.

O'Connor came second in the 2024 UCI World Championship.

He also competed for Australia at the 2024 Summer Olympics in the men's individual road race.

In 2025, O’Connor won stage eighteen of the 2025 Tour de France after attacking from the breakaway on the queen stage to the summit of the Col de la Loze and soloing to victory. He crossed the line 1 minute and 45 seconds ahead of race leader Tadej Pogačar, earning his second career Tour de France stage win and moving into the top ten of the general classification.

O'Connor participated in the 2026 Giro d'Italia, with the aim of challenging for a podium place. He was in fifth place in the General Classification at the start of Stage 14, however fell to eighth by the end of the stage after being one of the first contenders to lose contact with the main group. By the end of Stage 16 he was in ninth place, and he crossed the line nine minutes behind the winner on Stage 19 leading to him falling outside the top 10 overall.

== Major results ==
2015
6th Time trial, Oceanian Under-23 Road Championships
2016
1st Overall New Zealand Cycle Classic

1st Stage 4

3rd Time trial, National Under-23 Road Championships
3rd Overall Tour de Savoie Mont-Blanc
3rd Overall Tour de Taiwan
2017 (1 pro win)
5th Overall Tour of Austria

1st Stage 5

8th Overall Tour de Langkawi
2018 (1)
7th Overall Tour of the Alps

1st Young rider classification
1st Stage 3

10th Trofeo Matteotti
2019
6th Overall Tour of Austria
2020 (2)
1st Stage 17 Giro d'Italia
1st Stage 4 Étoile de Bessèges
2021 (1)
4th Overall Tour de France

1st Stage 9
Combativity award Stage 9

4th Mont Ventoux Dénivelé Challenge
5th Overall Tour des Alpes-Maritimes et du Var
6th Overall Tour de Romandie
8th Overall Critérium du Dauphiné
2022 (2)
1st Tour du Jura
3rd Overall Critérium du Dauphiné
5th Overall Tour de Romandie
6th Overall Volta a Catalunya

1st Stage 3

6th Classic Grand Besançon Doubs
7th Overall Vuelta a Andalucía
8th Overall Vuelta a España
2023
3rd Overall Critérium du Dauphiné
5th Tour du Jura
6th Overall Tour Down Under
7th Grand Prix Cycliste de Montréal
9th Overall Tour de Luxembourg
10th Tre Valli Varesine
2024 (3)
UCI Road World Championships

1st Team relay
2nd Road race

1st Vuelta a Murcia
2nd Overall Vuelta a España

1st Stage 6
Held after Stage 6–18
Combativity award Stage 6

2nd Overall UAE Tour

1st Stage 3

2nd Overall Tour of the Alps
4th Overall Giro d'Italia
5th Overall Tirreno–Adriatico
2025 (1)
Tour de France

1st Stage 18
Combativity award Stage 18

7th Overall Tour de Suisse
10th Overall Volta a la Comunitat Valenciana
2026
4th Time trial, National Championships
8th Overall Tour of the Alps
9th GP Industria & Artigianato di Larciano
10th Overall Tour Down Under

=== General classification results timeline ===
Grand Tour general classification results
Grand Tour	2017	2018	2019	2020	2021	2022	2023	2024	2025	2026
Giro d'Italia	—	DNF	32	20	—	—	—	4	—	16
Tour de France	—	—	—	—	4	DNF	17	—	11	28
Vuelta a España	—	—	25	—	—	8	—	2	DNF	
Major stage race general classification results
Race	2017	2018	2019	2020	2021	2022	2023	2024	2025	2026
Paris–Nice	—	—	—	DNF	12	DNF	—	—	14	—
Tirreno–Adriatico	—	—	—	—	—	—	13	5	—	—
Volta a Catalunya	42	11	DNF	NH	—	6	14	—	12	13
Tour of the Basque Country	—	—	—	NH	23	—	—	—	—	—
Tour de Romandie	—	—	—	NH	6	5	—	—	—	—
Critérium du Dauphiné	46	—	—	92	8	3	3	—	—	
Tour de Suisse	—	13	—	NH	—	—	—	—	7	

Legend
—	Did not compete
DNF	Did not finish
NH	Not Held
