= Diego Pablo Sevilla =

Spanish cyclist

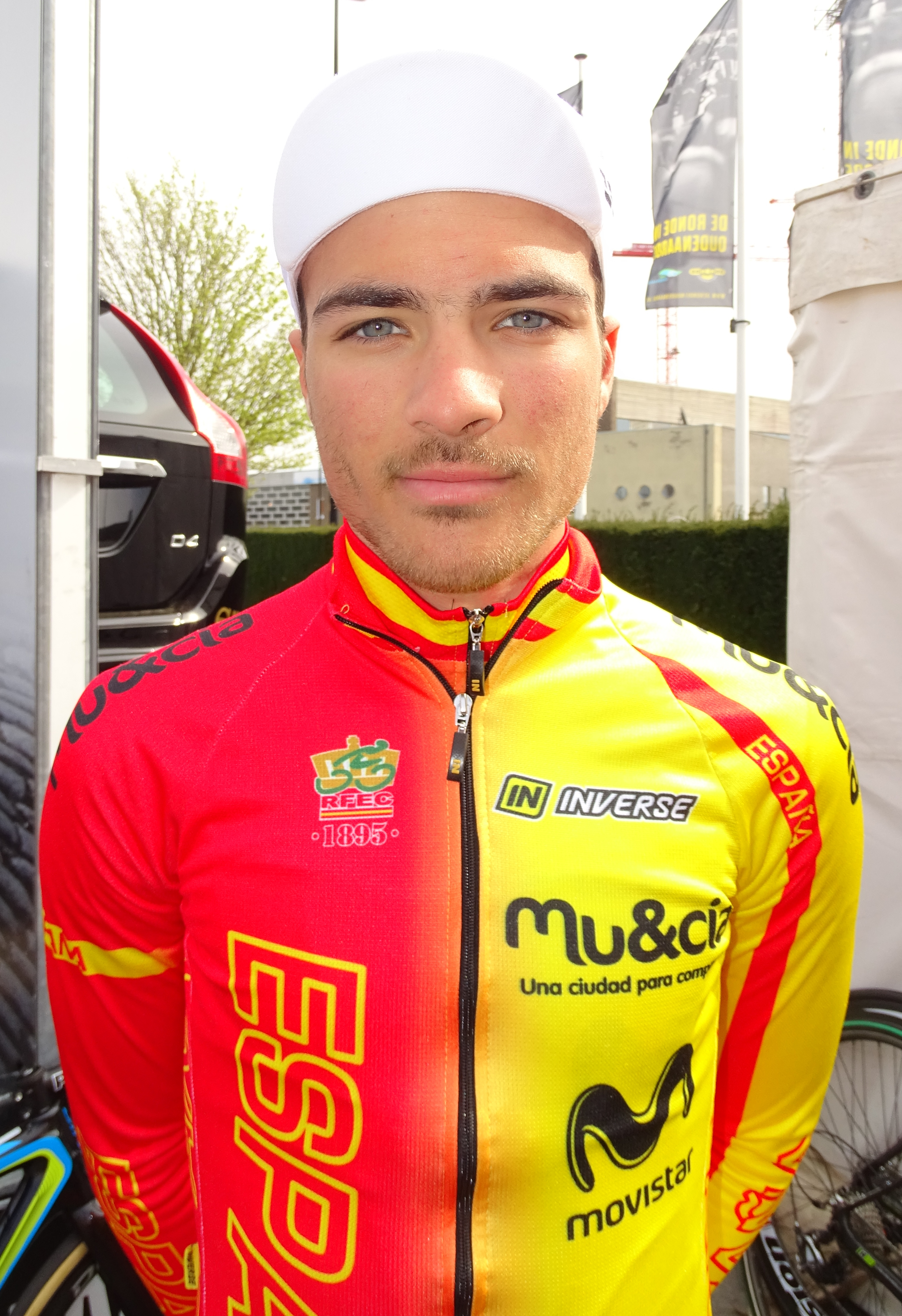
- Sevilla at the 2016 Ronde van Vlaanderen Beloften

Personal information
- Full name: Diego Pablo Sevilla López
- Born: 4 March 1996 (age 30) San Martín de la Vega, Spain
- Height: 1.71 m (5 ft 7 in)
- Weight: 64 kg (141 lb)

Cycling career
- Sport: Cycling
- Current team: Team Polti VisitMalta
- Discipline: Road
- Role: Rider

Amateur teams
- 2011: EnBici–Stevens–Mecha
- 2013–2015: Specialized-Fundación A.Contador
- 2016–2017: RH+–Polartec–Fundación Contador

Professional team
- 2018–: Polartec–Kometa

Diego Pablo Sevilla López (born 4 March 1996) is a Spanish racing cyclist, who currently rides for UCI ProTeam Team Polti VisitMalta.

In the 2026 Giro d'Italia, Sevilla joined the first breakaway of the race, finishing the day at the top of the mountains classification. He then attacked on the following two days to retain the jersey. He lost the jersey on stage seven to Jonas Vingegaard.

== Major results ==
2016
1st Stage 3 Tour of Galicia
2017
3rd Road race, National Under-23 Road Championships
2018
1st Mountains classification, Tour La Provence
4th Overall International Tour of Rhodes
2022
1st Sprints classification, Vuelta a Andalucía
2024
1st Mountains classification, Vuelta a Burgos
2026
1st Mountains classification, Tirreno–Adriatico
Giro d'Italia

Held after Stages 1–6

=== Grand Tour general classification results timeline ===
Grand Tour	2023	2024	2025	2026
Giro d'Italia	97	–	–	94
Tour de France	–	–	–	–
Vuelta a España	–	–	–	–
