= Guillermo Thomas Silva =

Uruguayan cyclist

Thomas Silva
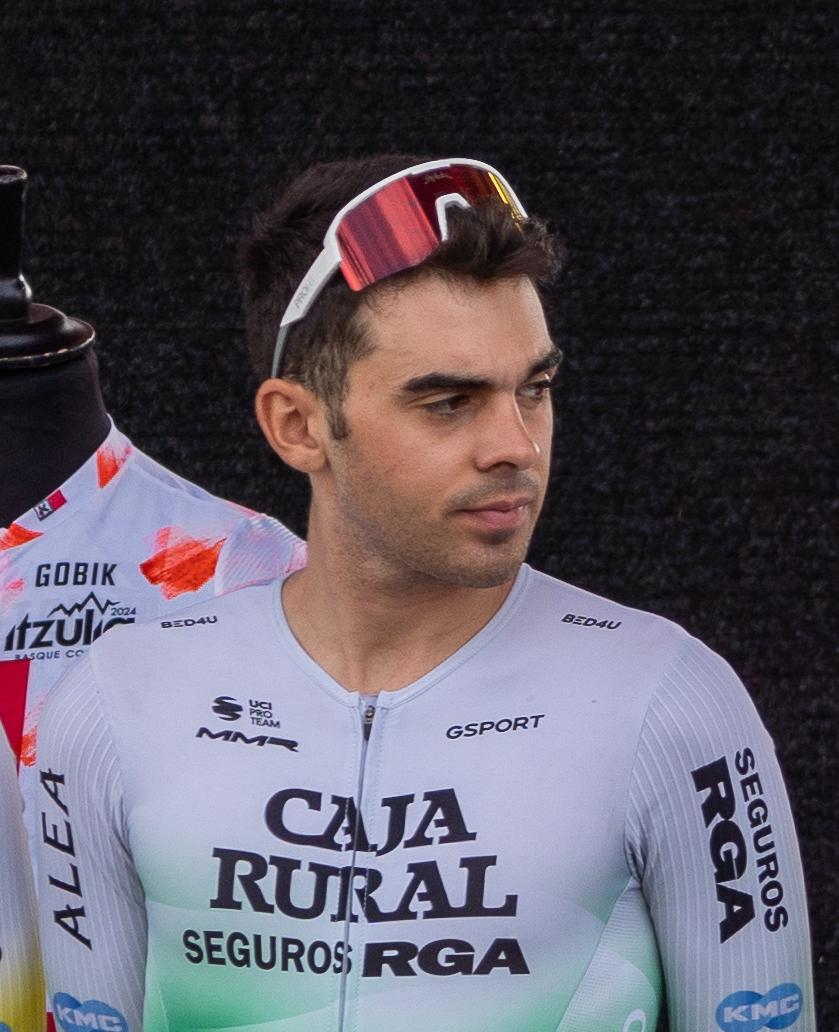
- Silva at the 2024 Tour of the Basque Country

Personal information
- Full name: Guillermo Thomas Silva Coussan
- Born: 30 December 2001 (age 24) Maldonado, Uruguay
- Height: 1.75 m (5 ft 9 in)
- Weight: 64 kg (141 lb)

Cycling career
- Sport: Cycling
- Current team: XDS Astana Team
- Discipline: Road
- Role: Rider
- Rider type: Puncheur

Amateur teams
- 2018–2020: CC Maldonado
- 2019–2020: Team Arte en Transfer–LPS
- 2021–2022: Previley–Coforma
- 2023: Caja Rural–Alea

Professional teams
- 2023: Caja Rural–Seguros RGA (stagiaire)
- 2024–2025: Caja Rural–Seguros RGA
- 2026–: XDS Astana Team

Major wins
- Grand Tours Giro d'Italia 1 individual stage (2026) Stage races Arctic Race of Norway (2026) Tour of Hainan (2026) One-day races and Classics National Road Race Championships (2022, 2025) South American Games (2026)

Guillermo Thomas Silva Coussan (born 30 December 2001) is a Uruguayan cyclist, who currently rides for UCI WorldTeam XDS Astana Team.

Silva won the second stage of the 2026 Giro d'Italia, making him the first Uruguayan to win a grand tour stage. As a result of his win he also took the pink jersey. He finished third in the points classification.

== Major results ==
2019
National Junior Road Championships

1st Road race
1st Time trial

2022 (1 pro win)
1st Road race, National Road Championships
2023
National Under-23 Road Championships

1st Road race
1st Time trial

1st Stage 3 Vuelta a Navarra
1st Stage 1 (TTT) Vuelta a la Comunidad de Madrid
2nd Overall Vuelta a Cantabria
2024
2nd Overall Tour of Qinghai Lake
2nd GP Industria & Artigianato di Larciano
3rd Time trial, National Road Championships
4th Prueba Villafranca de Ordizia
4th Circuito de Getxo
5th Overall Volta ao Alentejo

1st Stage 1

6th Clássica da Arrábida
7th Road race, Pan American Road Championships
10th Trofeo Matteotti
2025 (3)
National Road Championships

1st Road race
2nd Time trial

1st Stage 1 GP Beiras e Serra da Estrela
1st Mountains classification, Vuelta a Andalucía
2nd Tour of Qinghai Lake

1st Stage 2

4th GP Miguel Induráin
4th Grand Prix du Morbihan
6th Boucles de l'Aulne
8th Brabantse Pijl
2026 (8)
1st Overall Arctic Race of Norway

1st Young rider classification
1st Stage 3

1st Overall Tour of Hainan

1st Stages 2 & 4

Giro d'Italia

1st Stage 2
Held & after Stages 2–3

1st Clásica de Ordizia
1st Clásica Castilla y León
National Road Championships

3rd Road race
3rd Time trial

1st Road race, South American Games

=== Grand Tour general classification results timeline ===
Grand Tour	2025	2026
Giro d'Italia	—	65
Tour de France	—	—
Vuelta a España	78	—

Legend
—	Did not compete
DNF	Did not finish
