= Afonso Eulálio =

Portuguese bicycle racer

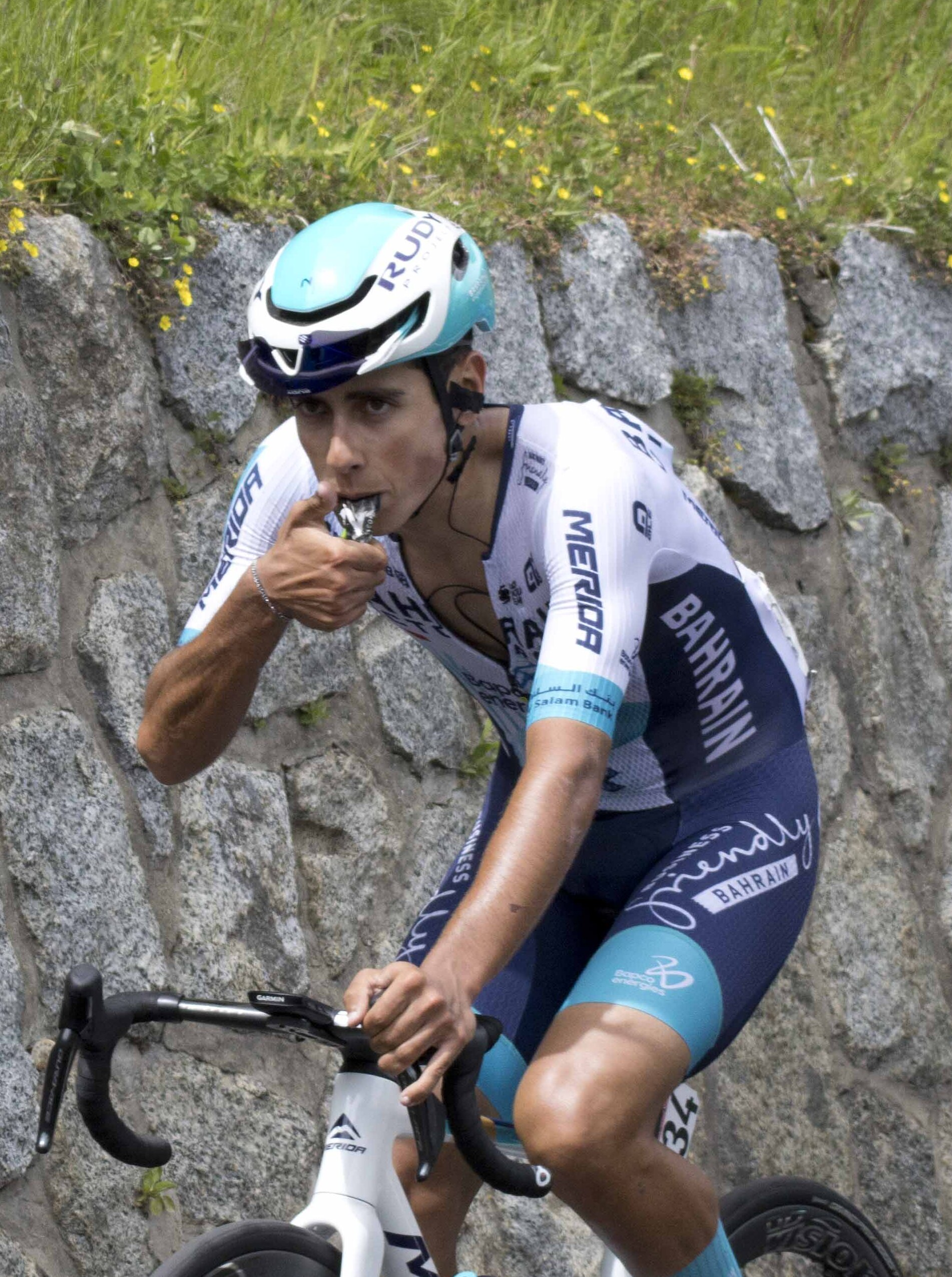
- Eulálio at the 2025 Giro d'Italia

Personal information
- Full name: Afonso Oliveira Eulálio
- Born: 30 September 2001 (age 25) Figueira da Foz, Portugal
- Height: 1.74 m (5 ft 9 in)
- Weight: 62 kg (137 lb)

Cycling career
- Sport: Cycling
- Current team: Team Bahrain Victorious
- Discipline: Road
- Role: Rider
- Rider type: Climber

Amateur team
- 2019: Vito–Feirense–PNB junior

Professional teams
- 2020–2021: Feirense
- 2022: Glassdrive–Q8–Anicolor
- 2023–2024: ABTF Betão–Feirense
- 2025–: Team Bahrain Victorious

Major wins
- Grand Tours Giro d'Italia Young rider classification (2026)

Afonso Oliveira Eulálio (born 30 September 2001) is a Portuguese cyclist, who currently rides for UCI WorldTeam Team Bahrain Victorious.

== Career ==
Eulálio initially competed in mountain biking, representing the São João de Ver team, before signing with Feirense in 2020. In 2022, he won the Under-23 Portuguese Road World Championship, and in 2024 he wore the yellow jersey at the Volta a Portugal for seven days and finished within the Top 10 overall.

In 2025, Eulálio signed for Team Bahrain Victorious. In his debut season with the team, he finished in tenth place on stage 17 of the Giro d'Italia, and finished on the podium at the Vuelta a Burgos. He also finished in ninth position at the World Championships road race.

At the 2026 Giro d'Italia, Eulálio took the race lead on stage five after joining the day's breakaway, gaining an advantage of more than six minutes over the race favourites. He held on to the jersey through the early mountain stages, and also through the time trial on stage 10, however conceded it to Jonas Vingegaard on stage 14. He ended the race in sixth position, and as the winner of the young rider classification, having the lowest general-classification time among riders born in 2001 or later.

== Major results ==
2022
1st Road race, National Under-23 Road Championships
2023
2nd Grand Prix de Mortágua
5th Prueba Villafranca de Ordizia
6th Overall Troféu Joaquim Agostinho

1st Young rider classification

7th Overall Grand Prix Jeseníky
2024
2nd Overall Troféu Joaquim Agostinho

1st Points classification
1st Young rider classification
1st Stage 3

2nd Prova de Abertura
3rd Overall Grande Prémio Jornal de Notícias

1st Stage 5

5th Overall Vuelta a Asturias
9th Circuito de Getxo
10th Overall Volta a Portugal
2025
6th Overall Tour of Britain
9th Road race, UCI Road World Championships
2026
5th Overall AlUla Tour
6th Overall Giro d'Italia

1st Young rider classification
Held after Stages 5–13

7th Gran Piemonte
8th Overall Tour of Guangxi
9th Grand Prix Cycliste de Montréal

=== Grand Tour general classification results timeline ===
Grand Tour	2025	2026
Giro d'Italia	DNF	6
Tour de France	—	—
Vuelta a España	—	—
