= Thymen Arensman =

Dutch cyclist

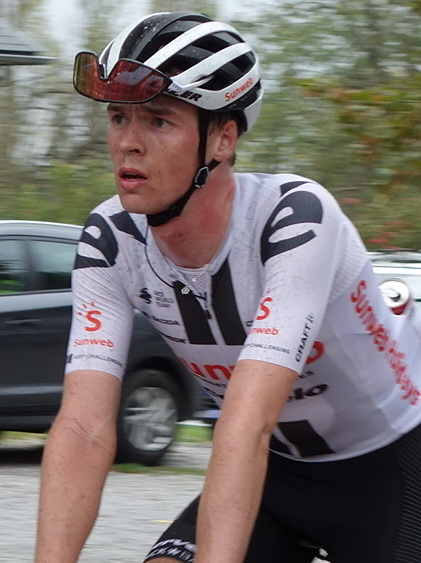
- Arensman at the 2020 La Flèche Wallonne

Personal information
- Full name: Thymen Arensman
- Born: 4 December 1999 (age 26) Deil, Netherlands
- Height: 1.90 m (6 ft 3 in)
- Weight: 68 kg (150 lb)

Cycling career
- Sport: Cycling
- Current team: Netcompany–Ineos
- Disciplines: Road; Cyclo-cross
- Role: Rider
- Rider type: Climber

Professional teams
- 2018–2020: SEG Racing Academy
- 2020–2022: Team Sunweb
- 2023–: INEOS Grenadiers

Major wins
- Grand Tours Tour de France 2 individual stages (2025) Vuelta a España 1 individual stage (2022)

Thymen Arensman (born 4 December 1999) is a Dutch cyclist, who currently rides for UCI WorldTeam Netcompany–Ineos.

== Career ==
A strong climber and time trialist, Arensman won the 15th stage of the 2022 Vuelta a España in a solo victory. That same season, he also won the stage six time trial, going on to finish second overall in the Tour de Pologne.

In 2025, Arensman took his first win in nearly three years on stage four of the Tour of the Alps, ultimately placing second overall.

Arensman then proceeded to claim two stage victories at that year's Tour de France. He won both stages 14 and 19 in a solo fashion on mountain-top finishes.

He also competed in cyclo-cross prior to joining the UCI World Tour with Team Sunweb in 2020.

== Major results ==
=== Cyclo-cross ===
2015–2016
Junior Superprestige

3rd Spa-Francorchamps

5th UEC European Junior Championships
2016–2017
1st National Junior Championships
UCI Junior World Cup

1st Heusden-Zolder
5th Namur

3rd Overall Junior Superprestige

2nd Zonhoven
2nd Gavere
2nd Hoogstraten
3rd Gieten
3rd Diegem

Junior Brico Cross

2nd Geraardsbergen

Junior DVV Trophy

3rd Baal

2017–2018
3rd National Under-23 Championships
2018–2019
Under-23 DVV Trophy

1st Koppenberg

=== Road ===
2017
2nd Time trial, National Junior Championships
2nd Overall Oberösterreich Juniorenrundfahrt

1st Stage 3

3rd Overall Internationale Niedersachsen-Rundfahrt
8th Overall Trofeo Karlsberg
2018
2nd Overall Tour de l'Avenir
3rd Paris–Roubaix Espoirs
2021
1st Young rider classification, Tour de Romandie
7th Overall Giro di Sicilia
2022 (2 pro wins)
2nd Overall Tour de Pologne

1st Stage 6 (ITT)

3rd Overall Tour of the Alps

1st Young rider classification

6th Overall Vuelta a España

1st Stage 15

6th Overall Tirreno–Adriatico
Combativity award Stage 16 Giro d'Italia
2023
6th Overall Giro d'Italia
2024
5th Time trial, UEC European Championships
5th Overall Volta ao Algarve
6th Overall Giro d'Italia
6th Overall Tirreno–Adriatico
2025 (3)
Tour de France

1st Stages 14 & 19
Combativity award Stage 19

2nd Overall Tour of the Alps

1st Stage 4

3rd Overall Paris–Nice
4th Overall Volta a la Comunitat Valenciana
9th Time trial, UCI World Championships
2026
3rd Overall Tour of the Alps
4th Overall Giro d'Italia
9th Overall Volta ao Algarve

==== General classification results timeline ====
Grand Tour	2020	2021	2022	2023	2024	2025	2026
Giro d'Italia	—	—	18	6	6	29	4
Tour de France	—	—	—	—	—	12	22
Vuelta a España	41	61	6	DNF	DNF	—	
Major stage race general classification results
Stage races	2020	2021	2022	2023	2024	2025	2026
Paris–Nice	—	—	—	—	—	3	—
Tirreno–Adriatico	—	—	6	22	6	—	15
Volta a Catalunya	NH	101	—	—	—	—	—
Tour of the Basque Country	NH	—	—	—	—	—	—
Tour de Romandie	NH	11	—	—	27	—	—
Critérium du Dauphiné	—	—	—	—	—	—	—
Tour de Suisse	NH	55	DNF	—	—	—	—

Legend
—	Did not compete
DNF	Did not finish
