= Michael Storer =

Australian bicycle racer

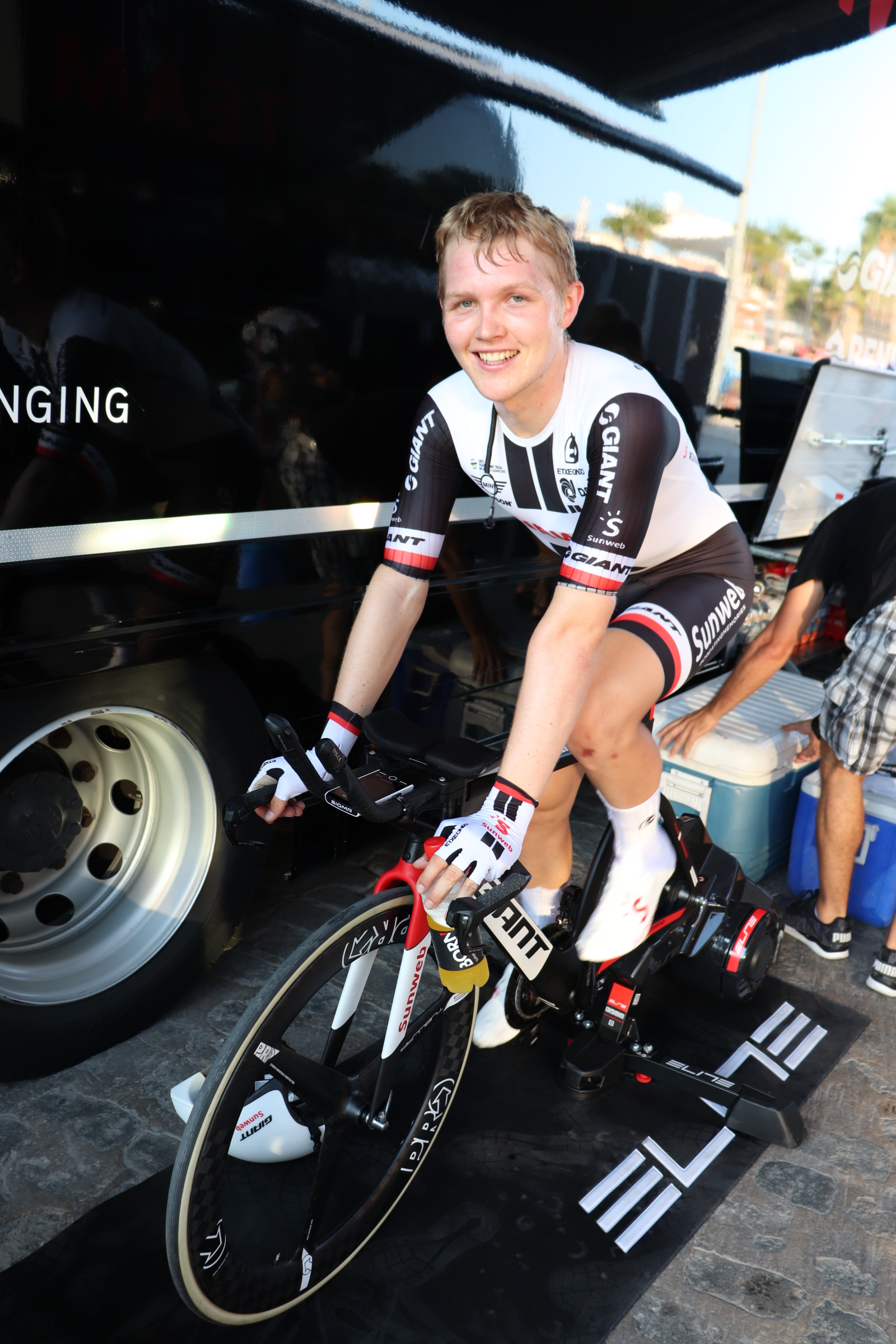
- Storer at the 2018 Vuelta a España.

Personal information
- Full name: Michael J. Storer
- Nicknames: Storer the Destroyer; Storerčar
- Born: 28 February 1997 (age 29) Sydney, NSW, Australia
- Height: 1.74 m (5 ft 9 in)
- Weight: 63 kg (139 lb)

Cycling career
- Sport: Cycling
- Current team: Tudor Pro Cycling Team
- Discipline: Road
- Role: Rider
- Rider type: Climber; Time trialist

Amateur team
- 2016: Jayco–AIS World Tour Academy

Professional teams
- 2017: Mitchelton Scott
- 2018–2021: Team Sunweb
- 2022–2023: Groupama–FDJ
- 2024–: Tudor Pro Cycling Team

Major wins
- Grand Tours Vuelta a España Mountains classification (2021) 2 individual stages (2021) Stage races Tour of the Alps (2025)
Medal record
Representing Australia
World Championships
Bronze medal – third place	2014 Ponferrada	Junior time trial

Michael J. Storer (born 28 February 1997) is an Australian cyclist, who currently rides for UCI ProTeam Tudor Pro Cycling Team.

== Early life and development ==
Michael Storer was born in Sydney, Australia in 1997, and raised in Perth, Western Australia. His family relocated to Perth when he was very young, and he undertook his cycling training in Western Australia.

As a junior and teenager, Storer trained with Midland Cycling Club and WAIS.

He has mentioned in interviews that he was also inspired and encouraged by his older brother who had trained in and participated in triathlons and cycling in Perth and National races, and who studied Sports Science at uni.

In an interview with The Domestiques Podcast prior to the 2025 Giro d'Italia Michael discusses some of this and other areas around cycling with Mike Tomalaris et al (~11:00).

== Career ==
In August 2018, he was named in the startlist for the Vuelta a España. He also competed in the 2019 Vuelta a España, and the 2020 Vuelta a España.

He rode the Giro for the first time in his career in 2021. He finished 31st while riding in support of Romain Bardet, who finished in 7th overall.

During the 2021 Vuelta a España Storer won the first grand tour stage of his career on stage 7 and then went on to win again on stage 10. With this he became just the 2nd Australian, after Michael Matthews, to win multiple stages in the Vuelta. On stage 7 and then again on stage 18, when he went on a solo attack of about 70 km before being caught on the final climb, he was awarded the combativity prize for the stage. With his attack on stage 18 he also took over the lead in the King of the Mountains competition and held onto the jersey thereafter winning the competition outright.

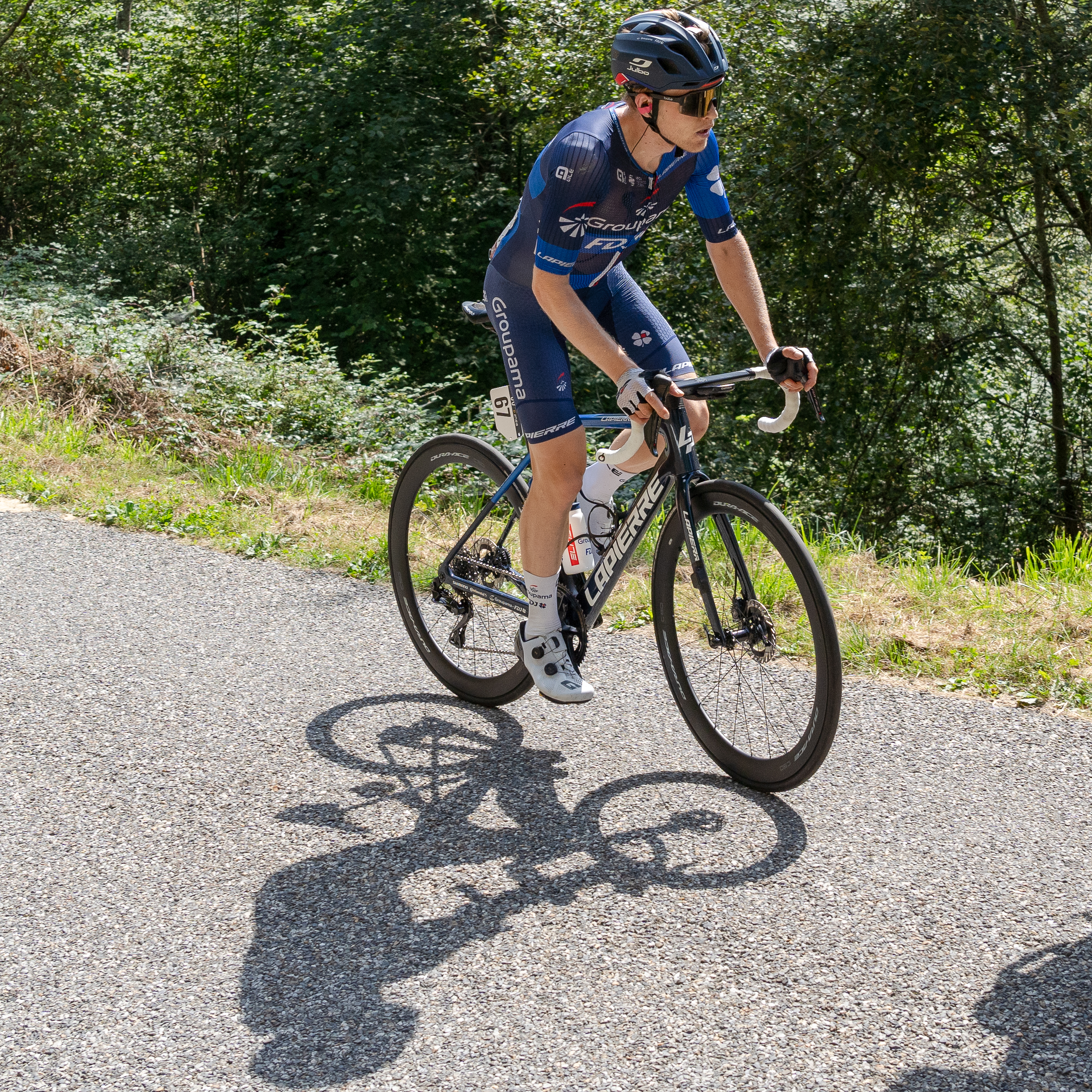
Storer at the 2023 Vuelta a España

In March 2025, Storer won stage 7 of the 2025 Paris–Nice in a solo move to Auron.

== Major results ==
2014
Oceanian Junior Road Championships

1st Time trial
5th Road race

3rd Time trial, UCI Junior Road World Championships
3rd Trofeo Buffoni
2015
Oceanian Junior Road Championships

1st Time trial
5th Road race

1st Road race, National Junior Road Championships
4th Overall Aubel–Thimister–La Gleize

1st Stage 3

2016
Oceanian Road Championships

1st Under-23 road race
3rd Under-23 time trial
4th Road race

1st Gran Premio di Poggiana
5th Road race, National Under-23 Road Championships
5th Chrono Champenois
7th Overall Tour de l'Avenir
2017
1st Gran Premio Industrie del Marmo
1st Stage 4 An Post Rás
1st Stage 1a (TTT) Toscana-Terra di Ciclismo
Oceanian Under-23 Road Championships

2nd Road race
4th Time trial

2nd Gran Premio di Poggiana
3rd Time trial, National Under-23 Road Championships
3rd Overall Giro della Valle d'Aosta
4th Gran Premio Palio del Recioto
5th Overall Herald Sun Tour
8th Giro del Belvedere
9th Overall Tour de l'Avenir
2018
5th Overall Tour de Yorkshire
5th Overall Tour of Slovenia
2020
7th Overall Herald Sun Tour
2021 (4 pro wins)
1st Overall Tour de l'Ain

1st Points classification
1st Mountains classification
1st Stage 3

Vuelta a España

1st Mountains classification
1st Stages 7 & 10
Combativity award Stages 7 & 18

2022
2nd Overall Tour of the Alps
3rd Mont Ventoux Dénivelé Challenge
10th Giro dell'Emilia
2023 (2)
1st Overall Tour de l'Ain

1st Points classification
1st Stage 3

3rd Overall Tour du Limousin
Combativity award Stage 13 Vuelta a España
2024
2nd Giro della Toscana
5th Overall Vuelta a Burgos
6th Overall UAE Tour
6th Overall Czech Tour
7th Overall Tour of the Alps
7th Coppa Sabatini
10th Overall Giro d'Italia
2025 (4)
1st Overall Tour of the Alps

1st Stage 2

1st Memorial Marco Pantani
2nd Giro della Toscana
3rd Giro di Lombardia
3rd Trofeo Laigueglia
5th Overall Paris–Nice

1st Stage 7

7th Giro dell'Emilia
10th Overall Giro d'Italia
10th Milano–Torino
Combativity award Stage 15 Tour de France
2026
4th Overall Tour of the Alps
4th Memorial Marco Pantani
7th Overall Giro d'Italia
9th Giro dell'Emilia
9th Giro della Toscana
10th Milano–Torino

=== Grand Tour general classification results timeline ===
Grand Tour	2018	2019	2020	2021	2022	2023	2024	2025	2026
Giro d'Italia	—	—	—	31	—	—	10	10	7
Tour de France	—	—	—	—	35	—	—	42	
Vuelta a España	117	99	40	40	—	45	—	—	

Legend
—	Did not compete
DNF	Did not finish
