= Gianmarco Garofoli =

Italian cyclist

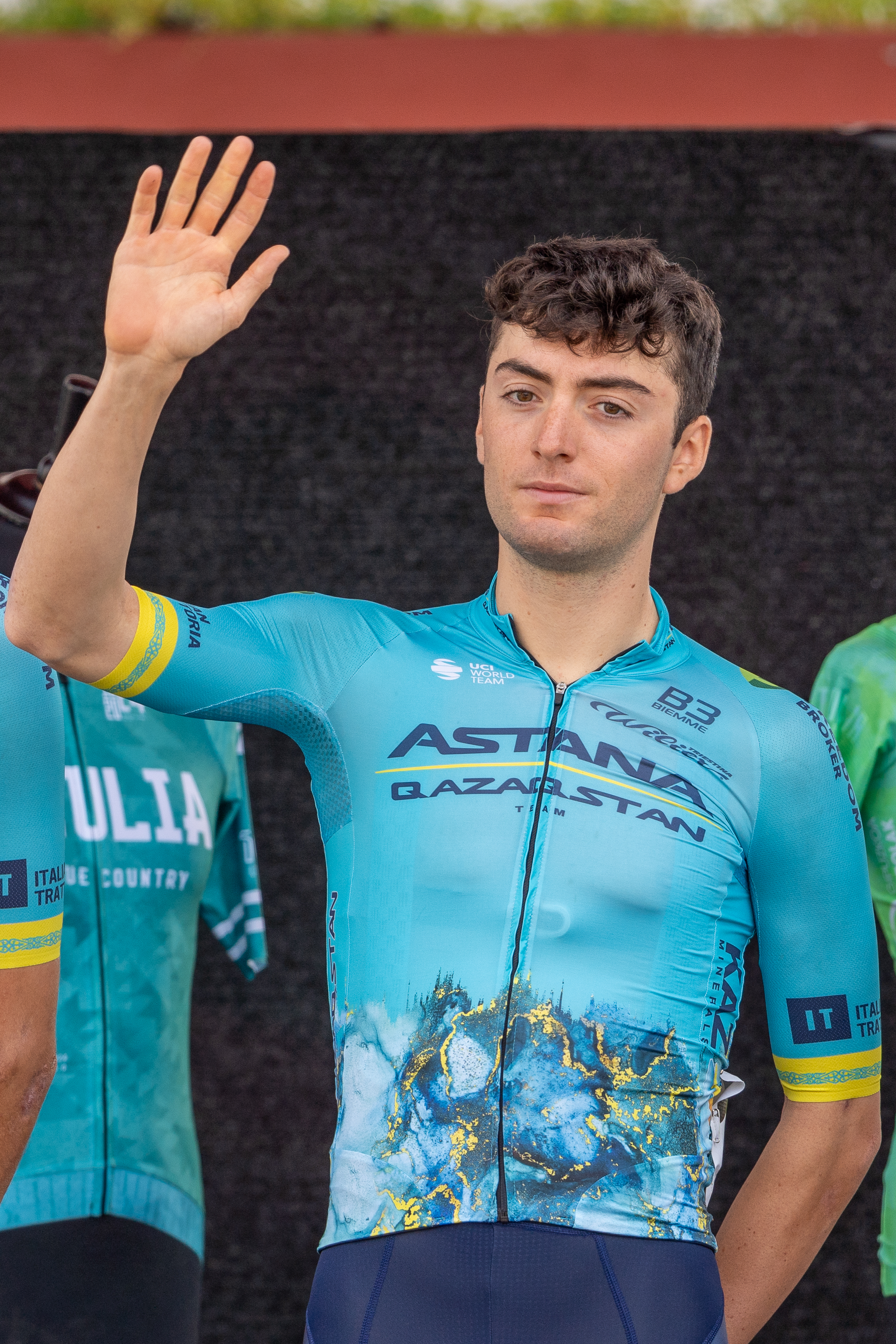
- Garofoli in 2024

Personal information
- Born: 6 October 2002 (age 24) Ancona, Italy
- Height: 1.80 m (5 ft 11 in)
- Weight: 63 kg (139 lb; 9 st 13 lb)

Cycling career
- Sport: Cycling
- Current team: Soudal–Quick-Step
- Discipline: Road
- Role: Rider
- Rider type: Climber

Amateur team
- 2019–2020: Team Lvf

Professional teams
- 2021: Development Team DSM
- 2022: Astana Qazaqstan Development Team
- 2023–2024: Astana Qazaqstan Team
- 2025–: Soudal–Quick-Step

Gianmarco Garofoli (born 6 October 2002) is an Italian cyclist, who currently rides for UCI WorldTeam Soudal–Quick-Step.

== Major results ==
2019
1st Road race, National Junior Road Championships
1st Giro di Primavera
1st Trofeo Buffoni
4th Trofeo Emilio Paganesi
5th Road race, UCI Junior Road World Championships
10th Overall Giro della Lunigiana
2020
2nd Time trial, National Junior Road Championships
2021
2nd Overall Giro della Valle d'Aosta

1st Young rider classification
1st Stage 2

2024
7th Prueba Villafranca de Ordizia
2025
9th Road race, UEC European Road Championships
2026
2nd Overall Giro di Sardegna

=== Grand Tour general classification results timeline ===
Grand Tour	2024
Giro d'Italia	—
Tour de France	—
Vuelta a España	48

Legend
—	Did not compete
DNF	Did not finish
