= 2026 Tour de Langkawi =

Malaysian cycling race

2026 UCI ProSeries

Race details
- Dates: 27 September - 4 October 2026
- Stages: 8
- Distance: 1,258.5 km (782.0 mi)
- Winning time: 28h 57' 04"

Results
| Jersey awarded to the overall winner | Winner | Lennart Jasch (GER) | (Tudor Pro Cycling Team) |
| | Second | Abel Balderstone (ESP) | (Caja Rural–Seguros RGA) |
| | Third | Jan Castellon (ESP) | (Caja Rural–Seguros RGA) |
| Jersey awarded to the points classification winner | Points | Matteo Malucelli (ITA) | (XDS Astana Team) |
| Jersey awarded to the mountains classification winner | Mountains | Lennart Jasch (GER) | (Tudor Pro Cycling Team) |
| | Team | (Spain) Caja Rural–Seguros RGA | |

The 2026 Tour de Langkawi was the 30th edition of the Tour de Langkawi road cycling stage race. A part of the 2026 UCI ProSeries, the race began on the 27th of September in Shah Alam and finished on the 4th of October in Putrajaya.

== Teams ==
Two UCI WorldTeams, eight UCI ProTeams, nine UCI Continental teams and one national team make up the twenty teams that participated in the race. The teams were announced by the organizers, the Malaysian National Sports Council (NSC) on 12 August 2026.

UCI WorldTeams

- Team Picnic–PostNL
- XDS Astana Team

UCI ProTeams

- Bardiani–CSF 7 Saber
- Burgos Burpellet BH
- Caja Rural–Seguros RGA
- Equipo Kern Pharma
- Modern Adventure Pro Cycling
- Team TotalEnergies
- Tudor Pro Cycling Team
- Unibet Rose Rockets

UCI Continental Teams

- 7 Eleven–Cliqq Roadbike Philippines
- Aisan Racing Team
- KSPO
- Malaysia Pro Cycling
- Nusantara Cycling Team
- St George Continental Cycling Team
- Terengganu Cycling Team
- Thailand Continental Cycling Team
- Wheeltop Rotor Chengdu Team

National Teams

- Malaysia

== Pre-race favourites ==
In the initial startlist given to the organizers, the leading cyclist to capture the general classification (GC) title appears to be Jordan Jegat (Team TotalEnergies), who accomplished back-to-back top-10 placings in the Tour de France GC in 2025 and 2026. However, due to him being drafted to the France team for the 2026 UCI Road World Championships men's road race on 27 September, Team TotalEnergies were forced to replace Jegat with Nicolas Breuillard, who has achieved fifth place in GC for both 2026 Presidential Cycling Tour of Turkiye and 2026 Czech Tour. Other contenders for the GC title include Jonathan Klever Caicedo who won the 2026 Tour of Magnificent Qinghai with Wheeltop Rotor Chengdu Team, Cedrik Bakke Christophersen (Unibet Rose Rockets) who placed 5th in last year's edition and 8th in 2026 Arctic Race of Norway as well as winning a stage there, and also Harold Martín López (winner of 2025 Tour de Hongrie and 2025 Tour of Hellas) and Aaron Gate (winner of 2025 Boucles de la Mayenne) from XDS Astana Team. Lennart Jasch (Tudor Pro Cycling Team) is also cited as a potential GC challenger.

Leading contenders for the points classification according to the initial startlist appears to be Matteo Malucelli from XDS Astana Team, who won the points jersey (orange) in 2024 and were leading the classification last year before his exit from the race after crashing in stage 6. Challenging him for the sprinters title this year will be the experienced Colombian Fernando Gaviria (Caja Rural–Seguros RGA), who has 5 Giro d'Italia stage wins and 2 Tour de France stage wins under his belt. Gaviria's participation was announced two days before the start of the race, replacing another Caja Rural top sprinter Iúri Leitão from the initial startlist.

For the mountains classification, Geoffrey Bouchard from Team TotalEnergies is considered a frontrunner for the green polkadot jersey by the organizers, based on him winning the mountains classification in both 2021 Giro d'Italia and 2019 Vuelta a Espana.

== Route ==
The routes were announced on 25 June 2026. For the first time since 2023, the race namesake Langkawi were omitted in any stages, and the routes also foregoes East Coast states which were present in 2025. Also for the second year running, East Malaysia states were also not included, as the organizers focused on the west coast of Peninsular Malaysia because of reduced budget compared to previous year. However the race also presents 3 mountain finishes in its route, including the debut of Cat.1 climb Gunung Jerai, and the returns of HC climbs Cameron Highlands (since 2024) and Genting Highlands (since 2023). Cameron and Genting Highlands will also feature in back-to-back stages, which only happened before in 2001 and 2011 edition of the race.

In light of the 2026 Southeast Asian haze that also affects Malaysia, organizers will make decisions on day-to-day and case-to-case basis whether to shorten or cancel a stage, should haze affects the safety of the race and participants.

Stage characteristics and winners
| Stage | Date | Course | Distance | Type | Stage winner |
|---|---|---|---|---|---|
| 1 | 27 September | Shah Alam to Kampar | 193 km (120 mi) | Flat stage | Matteo Malucelli (ITA) |
| 2 | 28 September | Taiping to Gunung Jerai | 145.6 km (90.5 mi) | Mountain stage | Lennart Jasch (GER) |
| 3 | 29 September | Sungai Petani to Kuala Kangsar | 189.9 km (118.0 mi) | Flat stage | Matteo Malucelli (ITA) |
| 4 | 30 September | Meru Raya to Cameron Highlands | 140.1 km (87.1 mi) | Mountain stage | Petr Rikunov |
| 5 | 1 October | Tapah to Genting Highlands | 125.7 km (78.1 mi) | Mountain stage | Nicolas Breuillard (FRA) |
| 6 | 2 October | Pandan Indah to Rembau | 121.3 km (75.4 mi) | Hilly stage | Riley Pickrell (CAN) |
| 7 | 3 October | Melaka to Batu Pahat | 159.1 km (98.9 mi) | Flat stage | Nil Gimeno (ESP) |
| 8 | 4 October | Muar to Putrajaya | 183.8 km (114.2 mi) | Flat stage | Matteo Malucelli (ITA) |
| Total | | | 1,258.5 km (782.0 mi) | | |

== Stages ==
=== Stage 1 ===
27 September 2026 — Shah Alam to Kampar, 193 km (120 mi)

Stage 1 Result
| Rank | Rider | Team | Time |
|---|---|---|---|
| 1 | Matteo Malucelli (ITA) | XDS Astana Team | 4h 06' 53" |
| 2 | Riley Pickrell (CAN) | Modern Adventure Pro Cycling | + 0" |
| 3 | Fernando Gaviria (COL) | Caja Rural–Seguros RGA | + 0" |
| 4 | Ronan Augé (FRA) | Unibet Rose Rockets | + 0" |
| 5 | Iker Villar (ESP) | Caja Rural–Seguros RGA | + 0" |
| 6 | Rodrigo Álvarez (ESP) | Burgos Burpellet BH | + 0" |
| 7 | Hijiri Oda (JPN) | Aisan Racing Team | + 0" |
| 8 | Gleb Syritsa | XDS Astana Team | + 0" |
| 9 | Seppe van den Boer (BEL) | Tudor Pro Cycling Team | + 0" |
| 10 | Filippo Cettolin (ITA) | Bardiani–CSF 7 Saber | + 0" |

General classification after Stage 1
| Rank | Rider | Team | Time |
|---|---|---|---|
| 1 | Matteo Malucelli (ITA) | XDS Astana Team | 4h 06' 43" |
| 2 | Javier Ibáñez (ESP) | Caja Rural–Seguros RGA | + 3" |
| 3 | Riley Pickrell (CAN) | Modern Adventure Pro Cycling | + 4" |
| 4 | Fernando Gaviria (COL) | Caja Rural–Seguros RGA | + 6" |
| 5 | Andrei Stepanov | Wheeltop Rotor Chengdu Team | + 6" |
| 6 | Nur Aiman Rosli (MAS) | Terengganu Cycling Team | + 6" |
| 7 | Petr Kelemen (CZE) | Tudor Pro Cycling Team | + 9" |
| 8 | Ronan Augé (FRA) | Unibet Rose Rockets | + 10" |
| 9 | Iker Villar (ESP) | Caja Rural–Seguros RGA | + 10" |
| 10 | Rodrigo Álvarez (ESP) | Burgos Burpellet BH | + 10" |

=== Stage 2 ===
28 September 2026 — Taiping to Gunung Jerai, 145.6 km (90.5 mi)

Stage 2 Result
| Rank | Rider | Team | Time |
|---|---|---|---|
| 1 | Lennart Jasch (GER) | Tudor Pro Cycling Team | 3h 37' 21" |
| 2 | Abel Balderstone (ESP) | Caja Rural–Seguros RGA | + 16" |
| 3 | Jan Castellon (ESP) | Caja Rural–Seguros RGA | + 32" |
| 4 | José Manuel Díaz (ESP) | Burgos Burpellet BH | + 1' 04" |
| 5 | Cedrik Bakke Christophersen (NOR) | Unibet Rose Rockets | + 1' 05" |
| 6 | Eivind Broholt Fougner (NOR) | Unibet Rose Rockets | + 1' 06" |
| 7 | Mattia Gaffuri (ITA) | Team Picnic–PostNL | + 1' 13" |
| 8 | Mathis Le Berre (FRA) | Team TotalEnergies | + 1' 26" |
| 9 | Jorge Gutiérrez (ESP) | Equipo Kern Pharma | + 1' 31" |
| 10 | Mathias Bregnhøj (DEN) | Terengganu Cycling Team | + 1' 36" |

General classification after Stage 2
| Rank | Rider | Team | Time |
|---|---|---|---|
| 1 | Lennart Jasch (GER) | Tudor Pro Cycling Team | 7h 44' 04" |
| 2 | Abel Balderstone (ESP) | Caja Rural–Seguros RGA | + 20" |
| 3 | Jan Castellon (ESP) | Caja Rural–Seguros RGA | + 38" |
| 4 | José Manuel Díaz (ESP) | Burgos Burpellet BH | + 1' 14" |
| 5 | Cedrik Bakke Christophersen (NOR) | Unibet Rose Rockets | + 1' 15" |
| 6 | Eivind Broholt Fougner (NOR) | Unibet Rose Rockets | + 1' 16" |
| 7 | Mattia Gaffuri (ITA) | Team Picnic–PostNL | + 1' 23" |
| 8 | Mathis Le Berre (FRA) | Team TotalEnergies | + 1' 36" |
| 9 | Jorge Gutiérrez (ESP) | Equipo Kern Pharma | + 1' 41" |
| 10 | Mathias Bregnhøj (DEN) | Terengganu Cycling Team | + 1' 46" |

=== Stage 3 ===
29 September 2026 — Sungai Petani to Kuala Kangsar, 189.9 km (118.0 mi)

Stage 2 Result
| Rank | Rider | Team | Time |
|---|---|---|---|
| 1 | Matteo Malucelli (ITA) | XDS Astana Team | 4h 31' 59" |
| 2 | Riley Pickrell (CAN) | Modern Adventure Pro Cycling | + 0" |
| 3 | Seppe Van Den Boer (BEL) | Tudor Pro Cycling Team | + 0" |
| 4 | Ronan Augé (FRA) | Unibet Rose Rockets | + 0" |
| 5 | Mohamad Izzat Hilmi Abdul Halil (MAS) | Malaysia Pro Cycling | + 0" |
| 6 | Nicola Marcerou (FRA) | Team TotalEnergies | + 0" |
| 7 | Fernando Gaviria (COL) | Caja Rural–Seguros RGA | + 0" |
| 8 | Rodrigo Álvarez (ESP) | Burgos Burpellet BH | + 0" |
| 9 | Iker Villar (ESP) | Caja Rural–Seguros RGA | + 0" |
| 10 | Daniel Cavia (ESP) | Burgos Burpellet BH | + 0" |

General classification after Stage 3
| Rank | Rider | Team | Time |
|---|---|---|---|
| 1 | Lennart Jasch (GER) | Tudor Pro Cycling Team | 12h 16' 03" |
| 2 | Abel Balderstone (ESP) | Caja Rural–Seguros RGA | + 20" |
| 3 | Jan Castellon (ESP) | Caja Rural–Seguros RGA | + 38" |
| 4 | José Manuel Díaz (ESP) | Burgos Burpellet BH | + 1' 14" |
| 5 | Cedrik Bakke Christophersen (NOR) | Unibet Rose Rockets | + 1' 15" |
| 6 | Eivind Broholt Fougner (NOR) | Unibet Rose Rockets | + 1' 16" |
| 7 | Mattia Gaffuri (ITA) | Team Picnic–PostNL | + 1' 23" |
| 8 | Mathis Le Berre (FRA) | Team TotalEnergies | + 1' 36" |
| 9 | Jorge Gutiérrez (ESP) | Equipo Kern Pharma | + 1' 41" |
| 10 | Mathias Bregnhøj (DEN) | Terengganu Cycling Team | + 1' 46" |

=== Stage 4 ===
30 September 2026 — Meru Raya to Cameron Highlands, 140.1 km (87.1 mi)

Stage 4 Result
| Rank | Rider | Team | Time |
|---|---|---|---|
| 1 | Petr Rikunov | Wheeltop Rotor Chengdu Team | 3h 29' 12" |
| 2 | Javier Ibáñez (ESP) | Caja Rural–Seguros RGA | + 3" |
| 3 | Alan Jousseaume (FRA) | Team TotalEnergies | + 9" |
| 4 | Nil Gimeno (ESP) | Equipo Kern Pharma | + 28" |
| 5 | Mathis Le Berre (FRA) | Team TotalEnergies | + 1' 35" |
| 6 | Mathias Bregnhøj (DEN) | Terengganu Cycling Team | + 1' 35" |
| 7 | Mikel Retegi (ESP) | Equipo Kern Pharma | + 1' 35" |
| 8 | Cedrik Bakke Christophersen (NOR) | Unibet Rose Rockets | + 1' 35" |
| 9 | Lennart Jasch (GER) | Tudor Pro Cycling Team | + 1' 35" |
| 10 | Luca Covili (ITA) | Bardiani–CSF 7 Saber | + 1' 35" |

General classification after Stage 4
| Rank | Rider | Team | Time |
|---|---|---|---|
| 1 | Lennart Jasch (GER) | Tudor Pro Cycling Team | 15h 46' 50" |
| 2 | Abel Balderstone (ESP) | Caja Rural–Seguros RGA | + 20" |
| 3 | Jan Castellon (ESP) | Caja Rural–Seguros RGA | + 38" |
| 4 | José Manuel Díaz (ESP) | Burgos Burpellet BH | + 1' 14" |
| 5 | Cedrik Bakke Christophersen (NOR) | Unibet Rose Rockets | + 1' 15" |
| 6 | Eivind Broholt Fougner (NOR) | Unibet Rose Rockets | + 1' 16" |
| 7 | Mattia Gaffuri (ITA) | Team Picnic–PostNL | + 1' 23" |
| 8 | Mathis Le Berre (FRA) | Team TotalEnergies | + 1' 36" |
| 9 | Jorge Gutiérrez (ESP) | Equipo Kern Pharma | + 1' 41" |
| 10 | Mathias Bregnhøj (DEN) | Terengganu Cycling Team | + 1' 46" |

=== Stage 5 ===
1 October 2026 — Tapah to Genting Highlands, 125.7 km (78.1 mi)

Stage 5 Result
| Rank | Rider | Team | Time |
|---|---|---|---|
| 1 | Nicolas Breuillard (FRA) | Team TotalEnergies | 3h 11' 26" |
| 2 | Josh Burnett (NZL) | Burgos Burpellet BH | + 8" |
| 3 | Lennart Jasch (GER) | Tudor Pro Cycling Team | + 21" |
| 4 | Jan Castellon (ESP) | Caja Rural–Seguros RGA | + 21" |
| 5 | José Manuel Díaz (ESP) | Burgos Burpellet BH | + 23" |
| 6 | Abel Balderstone (ESP) | Caja Rural–Seguros RGA | + 23" |
| 7 | Jorge Gutiérrez (ESP) | Equipo Kern Pharma | + 31" |
| 8 | Eivind Broholt Fougner (NOR) | Unibet Rose Rockets | + 38" |
| 9 | Mathias Bregnhøj (DEN) | Terengganu Cycling Team | + 1' 29" |
| 10 | Julen Arriola-Bengoa (ESP) | Caja Rural–Seguros RGA | + 1' 43" |

General classification after Stage 5
| Rank | Rider | Team | Time |
|---|---|---|---|
| 1 | Lennart Jasch (GER) | Tudor Pro Cycling Team | 18h 58' 33" |
| 2 | Abel Balderstone (ESP) | Caja Rural–Seguros RGA | + 26" |
| 3 | Jan Castellon (ESP) | Caja Rural–Seguros RGA | + 42" |
| 4 | José Manuel Díaz (ESP) | Burgos Burpellet BH | + 1' 20" |
| 5 | Eivind Broholt Fougner (NOR) | Unibet Rose Rockets | + 1' 37" |
| 6 | Jorge Gutiérrez (ESP) | Equipo Kern Pharma | + 1' 55" |
| 7 | Josh Burnett (NZL) | Burgos Burpellet BH | + 2' 56" |
| 8 | Mathias Bregnhøj (DEN) | Terengganu Cycling Team | + 2' 58" |
| 9 | Mathis Le Berre (FRA) | Team TotalEnergies | + 3' 25" |
| 10 | Cedrik Bakke Christophersen (NOR) | Unibet Rose Rockets | + 3' 30" |

=== Stage 6 ===
2 October 2026 — Pandan Indah to Rembau, 121.3 km (75.4 mi)

Stage 6 Result
| Rank | Rider | Team | Time |
|---|---|---|---|
| 1 | Riley Pickrell (CAN) | Modern Adventure Pro Cycling | 2h 40' 06" |
| 2 | Matteo Malucelli (ITA) | XDS Astana Team | + 0" |
| 3 | Seppe Van den Boer (BEL) | Tudor Pro Cycling Team | + 0" |
| 4 | Rory Townsend (IRL) | Unibet Rose Rockets | + 0" |
| 5 | Christiaan van Rees (NED) | Team Picnic–PostNL | + 0" |
| 6 | Mathis Le Berre (FRA) | Team TotalEnergies | + 0" |
| 7 | Rodrigo Álvarez (ESP) | Burgos Burpellet BH | + 0" |
| 8 | Daniel Cavia (ESP) | Burgos Burpellet BH | + 0" |
| 9 | Iker Villar (ESP) | Caja Rural–Seguros RGA | + 0" |
| 10 | Javier Ibáñez (ESP) | Caja Rural–Seguros RGA | + 0" |

General classification after Stage 6
| Rank | Rider | Team | Time |
|---|---|---|---|
| 1 | Lennart Jasch (GER) | Tudor Pro Cycling Team | 21h 38' 39" |
| 2 | Abel Balderstone (ESP) | Caja Rural–Seguros RGA | + 26" |
| 3 | Jan Castellon (ESP) | Caja Rural–Seguros RGA | + 42" |
| 4 | José Manuel Díaz (ESP) | Burgos Burpellet BH | + 1' 20" |
| 5 | Eivind Broholt Fougner (NOR) | Unibet Rose Rockets | + 1' 37" |
| 6 | Jorge Gutiérrez (ESP) | Equipo Kern Pharma | + 1' 55" |
| 7 | Josh Burnett (NZL) | Burgos Burpellet BH | + 2' 56" |
| 8 | Mathias Bregnhøj (DEN) | Terengganu Cycling Team | + 2' 58" |
| 9 | Mathis Le Berre (FRA) | Team TotalEnergies | + 3' 25" |
| 10 | Cedrik Bakke Christophersen (NOR) | Unibet Rose Rockets | + 3' 30" |

=== Stage 7 ===
3 October 2026 — Melaka to Batu Pahat, 159.1 km (98.9 mi)

Stage 7 Result
| Rank | Rider | Team | Time |
|---|---|---|---|
| 1 | Nil Gimeno (ESP) | Equipo Kern Pharma | 3h 12' 33" |
| 2 | Mario Aparicio (ESP) | Burgos Burpellet BH | + 0" |
| 3 | Andrei Stepanov | Wheeltop Rotor Chengdu Team | + 0" |
| 4 | Adne van Engelen (NED) | Terengganu Cycling Team | + 0" |
| 5 | Riley Pickrell (CAN) | Modern Adventure Pro Cycling | + 33" |
| 6 | Matteo Malucelli (ITA) | XDS Astana Team | + 33" |
| 7 | Christiaan Van Rees (NED) | Team Picnic–PostNL | + 33" |
| 8 | Filippo Cettolin (ITA) | Bardiani–CSF 7 Saber | + 33" |
| 9 | Seppe Van den Boer (BEL) | Tudor Pro Cycling Team | + 33" |
| 10 | Gleb Syritsa | XDS Astana Team | + 33" |

General classification after Stage 7
| Rank | Rider | Team | Time |
|---|---|---|---|
| 1 | Lennart Jasch (GER) | Tudor Pro Cycling Team | 24h 51' 45" |
| 2 | Abel Balderstone (ESP) | Caja Rural–Seguros RGA | + 26" |
| 3 | Jan Castellon (ESP) | Caja Rural–Seguros RGA | + 42" |
| 4 | José Manuel Díaz (ESP) | Burgos Burpellet BH | + 1' 20" |
| 5 | Eivind Broholt Fougner (NOR) | Unibet Rose Rockets | + 1' 37" |
| 6 | Jorge Gutiérrez (ESP) | Equipo Kern Pharma | + 1' 55" |
| 7 | Josh Burnett (NZL) | Burgos Burpellet BH | + 2' 56" |
| 8 | Mathias Bregnhøj (DEN) | Terengganu Cycling Team | + 2' 58" |
| 9 | Mathis Le Berre (FRA) | Team TotalEnergies | + 3' 25" |
| 10 | Cedrik Bakke Christophersen (NOR) | Unibet Rose Rockets | + 3' 30" |

=== Stage 8 ===
5 October 2025 — Tangkak to Kuala Lumpur, 180.2 km (112.0 mi)

Stage 8 Result
| Rank | Rider | Team | Time |
|---|---|---|---|
| 1 | Matteo Malucelli (ITA) | XDS Astana Team | 4h 05' 17" |
| 2 | Riley Pickrell (CAN) | Modern Adventure Pro Cycling | + 0" |
| 3 | Christiaan Van Rees (NED) | Team Picnic–PostNL | + 0" |
| 4 | Fernando Gaviria (COL) | Caja Rural–Seguros RGA | + 0" |
| 5 | Filippo Cettolin (ITA) | Bardiani–CSF 7 Saber | + 0" |
| 6 | Rory Townsend (IRL) | Unibet Rose Rockets | + 0" |
| 7 | Mathis Le Berre (FRA) | Team TotalEnergies | + 0" |
| 8 | Daniel Cavia (ESP) | Burgos Burpellet BH | + 0" |
| 9 | Mohamad Izzat Hilmi Abdul Halil (MAS) | Malaysia Pro Cycling | + 0" |
| 10 | Muh Imam Arifin (INA) | Nusantara Cycling Team | + 0" |

Final general classification
| Rank | Rider | Team | Time |
|---|---|---|---|
| 1 | Lennart Jasch (GER) | Tudor Pro Cycling Team | 28h 57' 04" |
| 2 | Abel Balderstone (ESP) | Caja Rural–Seguros RGA | + 26" |
| 3 | Jan Castellon (ESP) | Caja Rural–Seguros RGA | + 42" |
| 4 | José Manuel Díaz (ESP) | Burgos Burpellet BH | + 1' 20" |
| 5 | Eivind Broholt Fougner (NOR) | Unibet Rose Rockets | + 1' 37" |
| 6 | Jorge Gutiérrez (ESP) | Equipo Kern Pharma | + 1' 55" |
| 7 | Josh Burnett (NZL) | Burgos Burpellet BH | + 2' 56" |
| 8 | Mathias Bregnhøj (DEN) | Terengganu Cycling Team | + 2' 58" |
| 9 | Mathis Le Berre (FRA) | Team TotalEnergies | + 3' 23" |
| 10 | Cedrik Bakke Christophersen (NOR) | Unibet Rose Rockets | + 3' 30" |

== Classification leadership table ==
In Tour de Langkawi, four different jerseys were awarded. The general classification was calculated by adding each cyclist's finishing times on each stage, and applying time bonuses for the first three riders at intermediate sprints (three seconds to first, two seconds to second, and one second to third) and at the finish of mass-start stages; these were awarded to the first three finishers on all stages. For this edition, the leader of the general classification will wear an orange jersey, sponsored by the Malaysian Ministry of Youth and Sports; it was considered the most important of the race, and the winner of the classification was considered the winner of the race.

Additionally, there was a points classification, in which cyclists received points for finishing in the top 10 of each stage. Points towards the classification could also be won for the first three riders, respectively, at intermediate sprint points during each stage; these intermediate sprints also offered bonus seconds towards the general classification as noted above. For this edition, the leader will wear an blue jersey, sponsored by the Organising Committee for the 2027 SEA Games and ASEAN Para Games, to promote 2027 Southeast Asian Games and 2027 ASEAN Para Games that will be held in Malaysia.

For the mountains classification, points towards the classification were won by reaching the summit of a climb before other cyclists. Each climb was marked as either hors, first, second, or third-category, with more points available for the higher-categorized climbs. The leader of mountains classification will wear a green polka dot jersey, sponsored by local mineral water company Bubbles O2 for the second year running.

The fourth and final jersey represented the Asian rider classification. This was decided in the same way as the general classification, but only riders registered with cycling association of Asian nation were eligible to be ranked in the classification. The leader wears a white jersey, sponsored by National Sports Council (Malay: Majlis Sukan Negara (MSN)), an agency under the Malaysian Ministry of Youth and Sports (KBS) and the current organizer of the race.

There was also a team classification, in which the times of the best three cyclists per team on each stage were added together; the leading team at the end of the race was the team with the lowest total time. An Asian team classification will be also awarded, for a team or national team registered with Asian Cycling Confederation, with the team also having at least 3 Asian rider and in which the times of the best three Asian cyclists per team on each stage is counted towards the classification. Also, for every stage, Most Combative Rider award is given by the organizers special jury, to the rider who shows the consistency and effort in attacks, most time spent in breakaway, and positive sportsmanship, among others.

Classification leadership by stage
| Stage | Winner | General classification | Points classification | Mountains classification | Asian rider classification | Most combative rider | Team classification |
|---|---|---|---|---|---|---|---|
| 1 | Matteo Malucelli | Matteo Malucelli | Matteo Malucelli (Note: On stage 2, Riley Pickrell, who was second in the points classification, wore the blue jersey, because first-placed Matteo Malucelli wore the orange jersey as the leader of the general classification.) | Petr Rikunov | Nur Aiman Rosli | Javier Ibáñez | Caja Rural–Seguros RGA |
| 2 | Lennart Jasch | Lennart Jasch | Matteo Malucelli | Lennart Jasch (Note: On stage 3, Abel Balderstone, who was second in the mountains classification, wore the green polkadot jersey, because first-placed Lennart Jasch wore the orange jersey as the leader of the general classification. On stage 4, Nur Aiman Mohd Zariff, who was second in the mountains classification, wore the green polkadot jersey for the same reason.) | Yuhi Todome | Muhamad Iqbal Daniel Mohd Nawawi | Unibet Rose Rockets |
| 3 | Matteo Malucelli | Lennart Jasch | Matteo Malucelli | Lennart Jasch | Yuhi Todome | Muhammad Yusri Shaari | Unibet Rose Rockets |
| 4 | Petr Rikunov | Lennart Jasch | Matteo Malucelli | Petr Rikunov | Yuhi Todome | Nil Gimeno | Unibet Rose Rockets |
| 5 | Nicolas Breuillard | Lennart Jasch | Matteo Malucelli | Lennart Jasch (Note: On stages 6, 7, and 8, Petr Rikunov, who was second in the mountains classification, wore the green polkadot jersey, because first-placed Lennart Jasch wore the orange jersey as the leader of the general classification.) | Yuhi Todome | Nicolas Breuillard | Caja Rural–Seguros RGA |
| 6 | Riley Pickrell | Lennart Jasch | Matteo Malucelli | Lennart Jasch | Yuhi Todome | Mikel Retegi | Caja Rural–Seguros RGA |
| 7 | Nil Gimeno | Lennart Jasch | Matteo Malucelli | Lennart Jasch | Yuhi Todome | Adne van Engelen | Caja Rural–Seguros RGA |
| 8 | Matteo Malucelli | Lennart Jasch | Matteo Malucelli | Lennart Jasch | Yuhi Todome | Rui Udagawa | Caja Rural–Seguros RGA |
| Final | | Lennart Jasch | Matteo Malucelli | Lennart Jasch | Yuhi Todome | None | Caja Rural–Seguros RGA |

== Classification standings ==
Legend
| Denotes the leader of the general classification | Denotes the leader of the mountains classification |
| Denotes the leader of the points classification | Denotes the leader of the Asian rider classification |

=== General classification ===
Final general classification (1–10)
| Rank | Rider | Team | Time |
|---|---|---|---|
| 1 | Lennart Jasch (GER) | Tudor Pro Cycling Team | 28h 57' 04" |
| 2 | Abel Balderstone (ESP) | Caja Rural–Seguros RGA | + 26" |
| 3 | Jan Castellon (ESP) | Caja Rural–Seguros RGA | + 42" |
| 4 | José Manuel Díaz (ESP) | Burgos Burpellet BH | + 1' 20" |
| 5 | Eivind Broholt Fougner (NOR) | Unibet Rose Rockets | + 1' 37" |
| 6 | Jorge Gutiérrez (ESP) | Equipo Kern Pharma | + 1' 55" |
| 7 | Josh Burnett (NZL) | Burgos Burpellet BH | + 2' 56" |
| 8 | Mathias Bregnhøj (DEN) | Terengganu Cycling Team | + 2' 58" |
| 9 | Mathis Le Berre (FRA) | Team TotalEnergies | + 3' 23" |
| 10 | Cedrik Bakke Christophersen (NOR) | Unibet Rose Rockets | + 3' 30" |

=== Points classification ===
Final points classification (1–10)
| Rank | Rider | Team | Points |
|---|---|---|---|
| 1 | Matteo Malucelli (ITA) | XDS Astana Team | 64 |
| 2 | Riley Pickrell (CAN) | Modern Adventure Pro Cycling | 57 |
| 3 | Nil Gimeno (ESP) | Equipo Kern Pharma | 22 |
| 4 | Seppe van den Boer (BEL) | Tudor Pro Cycling Team | 22 |
| 5 | Andrei Stepanov | Wheeltop Rotor Chengdu Team | 21 |
| 6 | Fernando Gaviria (COL) | Caja Rural–Seguros RGA | 21 |
| 7 | Christiaan van Rees (NED) | Team Picnic–PostNL | 19 |
| 8 | Adne van Engelen (NED) | Terengganu Cycling Team | 15 |
| 9 | Javier Ibáñez (ESP) | Caja Rural–Seguros RGA | 14 |
| 10 | Mario Aparicio (ESP) | Burgos Burpellet BH | 13 |

=== Mountains classification ===
Final mountains classification (1-10)
| Rank | Rider | Team | Points |
|---|---|---|---|
| 1 | Lennart Jasch (GER) | Tudor Pro Cycling Team | 45 |
| 2 | Petr Rikunov | Wheeltop Rotor Chengdu Team | 41 |
| 3 | Jan Castellon (ESP) | Caja Rural–Seguros RGA | 26 |
| 4 | Nicolas Breuillard (FRA) | Team TotalEnergies | 25 |
| 5 | Abel Balderstone (ESP) | Caja Rural–Seguros RGA | 21 |
| 6 | Josh Burnett (NZL) | Burgos Burpellet BH | 20 |
| 7 | Alan Jousseaume (FRA) | Team TotalEnergies | 20 |
| 8 | Javier Ibáñez (ESP) | Caja Rural–Seguros RGA | 20 |
| 9 | José Manuel Díaz (ESP) | Burgos Burpellet BH | 18 |
| 10 | Nur Aiman Mohd Zariff (MAS) | Terengganu Cycling Team | 14 |

=== Asian rider classification ===
Final Asian rider classification (1–10)
| Rank | Rider | Team | Time |
|---|---|---|---|
| 1 | Yuhi Todome (JPN) | Aisan Racing Team | 29h 04' 25" |
| 2 | Ren Bao Tsen (MAS) | St George Continental Cycling Team | + 3' 44" |
| 3 | Zhe Yie Kee (MAS) | Terengganu Cycling Team | + 5' 58" |
| 4 | Li Chaoyi (CHN) | Wheeltop Rotor Chengdu Team | + 7' 10" |
| 5 | Ilham Dzikri Ramadhan (INA) | Nusantara Cycling Team | + 8' 15" |
| 6 | Bold Iderbold (MGL) | Wheeltop Rotor Chengdu Team | + 8' 44" |
| 7 | Muhammad Syawal Mazlin (MAS) | Malaysia Pro Cycling | + 9' 42" |
| 8 | Muhamad Herlangga (INA) | Nusantara Cycling Team | + 9' 47" |
| 9 | Erickson Lopez (PHI) | Malaysia Pro Cycling | + 12' 28" |
| 10 | Muhammad Ridwan (INA) | Nusantara Cycling Team | + 14' 14" |

=== Team classification ===
Final team classification (1–10)
| Rank | Team | Time |
|---|---|---|
| 1 | (Spain) Caja Rural–Seguros RGA | 87h 02' 14" |
| 2 | (France) Unibet Rose Rockets | + 3' 35" |
| 3 | (Spain) Burgos Burpellet BH | + 4' 37" |
| 4 | (Italy) Bardiani–CSF 7 Saber | + 9' 07" |
| 5 | (Malaysia) Terengganu Cycling Team | + 10' 52" |
| 6 | (France) Team TotalEnergies | + 17' 25" |
| 7 | (Switzerland) Tudor Pro Cycling Team | + 18' 10" |
| 8 | (Spain) Equipo Kern Pharma | + 19' 59" |
| 9 | (Australia) St George Continental Cycling Team | + 20' 27" |
| 10 | (China) Wheeltop Rotor Chengdu Team | + 22' 01" |
