= 2025 Caja Rural–Seguros RGA season =

Caja Rural–Seguros RGA
- 2025 season
- UCI code: CJR
- Status: UCI ProTeam
- Manager: Juan Manuel Hernández (ESP)
- Based: Spain
- Bicycles: MMR
- Groupset: Shimano

Season victories
- One-day races: 1
- National Championships: 1
- Most wins: (Portugal) Iúri Leitão (Uruguay) Guillermo Thomas Silva (1 win each)

The 2025 season for the Caja Rural–Seguros RGA team is the team's 16th season in existence, and its 6th season as a UCI ProTeam.

== Team roster ==
All ages are as of 1 January 2025, the first day of the 2025 season.

As of 14 January 2025.

Rider	Date of birth
Julen Arriola-Bengoa (ESP)	16 February 2001 (aged 23)
Daniel Babor (CZE)	22 October 1999 (aged 25)
Abel Balderstone (ESP)	7 July 2000 (aged 24)
Fernando Barceló (ESP)	6 January 1996 (aged 28)
Sebastian Berwick (AUS)	15 December 1999 (aged 25)
Joan Bou (ESP)	16 January 1997 (aged 27)
Jan Castellon (ESP)	31 July 2003 (aged 21)
Sergi Darder (ESP)	30 June 2003 (aged 21)
Álex Díaz (ESP)	28 July 2001 (aged 23)
Samuel Fernández (ESP)	11 July 2003 (aged 21)
Abner González (PUR)	9 October 2000 (aged 24)
Jaume Guardeño (ESP)	20 February 2003 (aged 21)

Rider	Date of birth
Javier Ibañez (ESP)	29 November 2001 (aged 23)
Calum Johnston (GBR)	1 November 1998 (aged 26)
Iúri Leitão (POR)	3 July 1998 (aged 26)
Joseba López (ESP)	5 March 2000 (aged 24)
Alex Molenaar (NED)	13 July 1999 (aged 25)
Joel Nicolau (ESP)	23 December 1997 (aged 27)
Jakub Otruba (CZE)	30 January 1998 (aged 26)
Francisco Joel Peñuela (VEN)	1 February 2001 (aged 23)
Eduard Prades (ESP)	9 August 1987 (aged 37)
Guillermo Thomas Silva (URU)	30 December 2001 (aged 23)
Gorka Sorarrain (ESP)	21 May 1996 (aged 28)
Tyler Stites (USA)	18 March 1998 (aged 26)

== Season victories ==
Date	Race	Competition	Rider	Country	Location	Ref.
2 February	Trofeo Palma	UCI Europe Tour	Iúri Leitão (POR)	Spain	Palma	

== National, Continental, and World Champions ==
Date	Discipline	Jersey	Rider	Country	Location	Ref.
9 February	Uruguayan National Road Race Championships		Guillermo Thomas Silva (URU)	Uruguay	Paysandú	
