= 2026 Arctic Race of Norway =

2026 UCI ProSeries

Race details
- Dates: 13–16 August 2026
- Stages: 4
- Distance: 698.9 km (434.3 mi)
- Winning time: 15h 34' 12"

Results
| Jersey awarded to the overall winner | Winner | Guillermo Thomas Silva (URU) | (XDS Astana Team) |
| | Second | Lennert Van Eetvelt (BEL) | (Lotto–Intermarché) |
| | Third | Alessandro Pinarello (ITA) | (NSN Cycling Team) |
| Jersey awarded to the points classification winner | Points | Giovanni Lonardi (ITA) | (Team Polti VisitMalta) |
| Jersey awarded to the mountains classification winner | Mountains | Morthen Wang Baksaas (NOR) | (Lucky Sport Cycling Team) |
| Jersey awarded to the young rider classification winner | Young rider | Guillermo Thomas Silva (URU) | (XDS Astana Team) |
| | Team | (France) Unibet Rose Rockets | |

The 2026 Arctic Race of Norway was a road cycling stage race that took place between 13 and 16 August 2026. It was the 13th edition of the Arctic Race of Norway, which was rated as a 2.Pro event on the 2026 UCI ProSeries calendar.

== Teams ==
Six UCI WorldTeams, eight UCI ProTeams, and four UCI Continental teams made up the eighteen teams that competed in the race.

UCI WorldTeams

- Lotto–Intermarché
- NSN Cycling Team
- Team Jayco–AlUla
- Team Picnic–PostNL
- Uno-X Mobility
- XDS Astana Team

UCI ProTeams

- Caja Rural–Seguros RGA
- Euskaltel–Euskadi
- Modern Adventure Pro Cycling
- Pinarello–Q36.5 Pro Cycling Team
- Team Flanders–Baloise
- Team Polti VisitMalta
- Team TotalEnergies
- Unibet Rose Rockets

UCI Continental Teams

- Lillehammer CK Continental Team
- Lucky Sport Cycling Team
- Team Drali–Repsol
- Team Ringerike

== Route ==
Stage characteristics and winners
| Stage | Date | Route | Distance | Type | Winner |
|---|---|---|---|---|---|
| 1 | 13 August | Evenes to Myre | 181.9 km (113.0 mi) | Hilly stage | Giovanni Lonardi (ITA) |
| 2 | 14 August | Bø i Vesterålen to Andenes | 180 km (110 mi) | Hilly stage | Erlend Blikra (NOR) |
| 3 | 15 August | Stokmarknes to Storheia Summit (Melbu) | 146.5 km (91.0 mi) | Hilly stage | Guillermo Thomas Silva (URU) |
| 4 | 16 August | Sortland to Narvik | 190.5 km (118.4 mi) | Hilly stage | Cedrik Bakke Christophersen (NOR) |
| Total | | | 666.2 km (414.0 mi) | | |

== Stages ==
=== Stage 1 ===
13 August 2026 — Evenes to Myre, 181.9 km (113.0 mi)

Stage 1 Result
| Rank | Rider | Team | Time |
|---|---|---|---|
| 1 | Giovanni Lonardi (ITA) | Team Polti VisitMalta | 4h 05' 23" |
| 2 | Jason Tesson (FRA) | Team TotalEnergies | + 0" |
| 3 | Riley Pickrell (CAN) | Modern Adventure Pro Cycling | + 0" |
| 4 | Erlend Blikra (NOR) | Uno-X Mobility | + 0" |
| 5 | Ethan Vernon (GBR) | NSN Cycling Team | + 0" |
| 6 | Nikiforos Arvanitou (GRE) | XDS Astana Team | + 0" |
| 7 | Lionel Taminiaux (BEL) | Lotto–Intermarché | + 0" |
| 8 | Mathieu Kockelmann (LUX) | Lotto–Intermarché | + 0" |
| 9 | Vilmer Ekman (SWE) | Lucky Sport Cycling Team | + 0" |
| 10 | Emīls Liepiņš (LAT) | Pinarello–Q36.5 Pro Cycling Team | + 0" |

General classification after Stage 1
| Rank | Rider | Team | Time |
|---|---|---|---|
| 1 | Giovanni Lonardi (ITA) | Team Polti VisitMalta | 4h 05' 13" |
| 2 | Jason Tesson (FRA) | Team TotalEnergies | + 4" |
| 3 | Teodor De Luca (SWE) | Lucky Sport Cycling Team | + 4" |
| 4 | Riley Pickrell (CAN) | Modern Adventure Pro Cycling | + 6" |
| 5 | Victor Vercouille (BEL) | Team Flanders–Baloise | + 6" |
| 6 | Ludvik Holstad (NOR) | Team Ringerike | + 8" |
| 7 | Erlend Blikra (NOR) | Uno-X Mobility | + 10" |
| 8 | Ethan Vernon (GBR) | NSN Cycling Team | + 10" |
| 9 | Nikiforos Arvanitou (GRE) | XDS Astana Team | + 10" |
| 10 | Lionel Taminiaux (BEL) | Lotto–Intermarché | + 10" |

=== Stage 2 ===
14 August 2026 — Bø i Vesterålen to Andenes, 180 km (110 mi)

Stage 2 Result
| Rank | Rider | Team | Time |
|---|---|---|---|
| 1 | Erlend Blikra (NOR) | Uno-X Mobility | 3h 56' 49" |
| 2 | Ethan Vernon (GBR) | NSN Cycling Team | + 0" |
| 3 | Giovanni Lonardi (ITA) | Team Polti VisitMalta | + 0" |
| 4 | Riley Pickrell (CAN) | Modern Adventure Pro Cycling | + 0" |
| 5 | Anders Foldager (DEN) | Team Jayco–AlUla | + 0" |
| 6 | Jason Tesson (FRA) | Team TotalEnergies | + 0" |
| 7 | Lorrenzo Manzin (FRA) | Team TotalEnergies | + 0" |
| 8 | Nikiforos Arvanitou (GRE) | XDS Astana Team | + 0" |
| 9 | Ronan Augé (FRA) | Unibet Rose Rockets | + 0" |
| 10 | Brody McDonald (USA) | Modern Adventure Pro Cycling | + 0" |

General classification after Stage 2
| Rank | Rider | Team | Time |
|---|---|---|---|
| 1 | Giovanni Lonardi (ITA) | Team Polti VisitMalta | 8h 01' 58" |
| 2 | Erlend Blikra (NOR) | Uno-X Mobility | + 4" |
| 3 | Teodor De Luca (SWE) | Lucky Sport Cycling Team | + 6" |
| 4 | Ethan Vernon (GBR) | NSN Cycling Team | + 8" |
| 5 | Jason Tesson (FRA) | Team TotalEnergies | + 8" |
| 6 | Guillermo Thomas Silva (URU) | XDS Astana Team | + 8" |
| 7 | Riley Pickrell (CAN) | Modern Adventure Pro Cycling | + 10" |
| 8 | Vincent Van Hemelen (BEL) | Team Flanders–Baloise | + 10" |
| 9 | Victor Vercouille (BEL) | Team Flanders–Baloise | + 10" |
| 10 | Ludvik Holstad (NOR) | Team Ringerike | + 12" |

=== Stage 3 ===
15 August 2026 — Stokmarknes to Storheia Summit (Melbu), 146.5 km (91.0 mi)

At the beginning of stage 3, the riders from NSN lined up at the front of the peloton while the audience held one minute of applause. This was to honour Finlay Tarling, a rider from the NSN Development Team, who had died the previous day after a collision during the Volta a Portugal.

Stage 3 Result
| Rank | Rider | Team | Time |
|---|---|---|---|
| 1 | Guillermo Thomas Silva (URU) | XDS Astana Team | 3h 29' 11" |
| 2 | Lennert Van Eetvelt (BEL) | Lotto–Intermarché | + 0" |
| 3 | Alessandro Pinarello (ITA) | NSN Cycling Team | + 9" |
| 4 | Robbe Dhondt (BEL) | Team Picnic–PostNL | + 9" |
| 5 | Felix Engelhardt (GER) | Team Jayco–AlUla | + 15" |
| 6 | Sebastian Berwick (AUS) | Caja Rural–Seguros RGA | + 16" |
| 7 | Thomas Bonnet (FRA) | Team TotalEnergies | + 19" |
| 8 | Wout Poels (NED) | Unibet Rose Rockets | + 20" |
| 9 | Joris Delbove (FRA) | Team TotalEnergies | + 24" |
| 10 | Fabio Christen (SUI) | Pinarello–Q36.5 Pro Cycling Team | + 26" |

General classification after Stage 3
| Rank | Rider | Team | Time |
|---|---|---|---|
| 1 | Guillermo Thomas Silva (URU) | XDS Astana Team | 11h 31' 07" |
| 2 | Lennert Van Eetvelt (BEL) | Lotto–Intermarché | + 10" |
| 3 | Alessandro Pinarello (ITA) | NSN Cycling Team | + 21" |
| 4 | Robbe Dhondt (BEL) | Team Picnic–PostNL | + 25" |
| 5 | Felix Engelhardt (GER) | Team Jayco–AlUla | + 31" |
| 6 | Sebastian Berwick (AUS) | Caja Rural–Seguros RGA | + 32" |
| 7 | Thomas Bonnet (FRA) | Team TotalEnergies | + 35" |
| 8 | Wout Poels (NED) | Unibet Rose Rockets | + 36" |
| 9 | Joris Delbove (FRA) | Team TotalEnergies | + 40" |
| 10 | Fabio Christen (SUI) | Pinarello–Q36.5 Pro Cycling Team | + 42" |

=== Stage 4 ===
16 August 2026 — Sortland to Narvik, 190.5 km (118.4 mi)

Stage 4 Result
| Rank | Rider | Team | Time |
|---|---|---|---|
| 1 | Cedrik Bakke Christophersen (NOR) | Unibet Rose Rockets | 4h 03' 06" |
| 2 | Ludovico Crescioli (ITA) | Team Polti VisitMalta | + 3" |
| 3 | Guillermo Thomas Silva (URU) | XDS Astana Team | + 3" |
| 4 | Lennert Van Eetvelt (BEL) | Lotto–Intermarché | + 3" |
| 5 | Alessandro Pinarello (ITA) | NSN Cycling Team | + 3" |
| 6 | Joris Delbove (FRA) | Team TotalEnergies | + 3" |
| 7 | Gotzon Martín (ESP) | Euskaltel–Euskadi | + 3" |
| 8 | Thomas Bonnet (FRA) | Team TotalEnergies | + 3" |
| 9 | Johannes Kulset (NOR) | Uno-X Mobility | + 3" |
| 10 | Wout Poels (NED) | Unibet Rose Rockets | + 3" |

General classification after Stage 4
| Rank | Rider | Team | Time |
|---|---|---|---|
| 1 | Guillermo Thomas Silva (URU) | XDS Astana Team | 15h 34' 12" |
| 2 | Lennert Van Eetvelt (BEL) | Lotto–Intermarché | + 14" |
| 3 | Alessandro Pinarello (ITA) | NSN Cycling Team | + 25" |
| 4 | Felix Engelhardt (GER) | Team Jayco–AlUla | + 35" |
| 5 | Sebastian Berwick (AUS) | Caja Rural–Seguros RGA | + 36" |
| 6 | Thomas Bonnet (FRA) | Team TotalEnergies | + 39" |
| 7 | Wout Poels (NED) | Unibet Rose Rockets | + 40" |
| 8 | Cedrik Bakke Christophersen (NOR) | Unibet Rose Rockets | + 42" |
| 9 | Joris Delbove (FRA) | Team TotalEnergies | + 44" |
| 10 | Johannes Kulset (NOR) | Uno-X Mobility | + 55" |

== Classification leadership table ==
Classification leadership by stage
| Stage | Winner | General classification | Points classification | Mountains classification | Young rider classification | Team classification |
|---|---|---|---|---|---|---|
| 1 | Giovanni Lonardi | Giovanni Lonardi | Giovanni Lonardi | Morthen Wang Baksaas | Teodor De Luca | NSN Cycling Team |
| 2 | Erlend Blikra | Giovanni Lonardi | Giovanni Lonardi | Morthen Wang Baksaas | Teodor De Luca | Euskaltel–Euskadi |
| 3 | Guillermo Thomas Silva | Guillermo Thomas Silva | Giovanni Lonardi | Morthen Wang Baksaas | Guillermo Thomas Silva | Unibet Rose Rockets |
| 4 | Cedrik Bakke Christophersen | Guillermo Thomas Silva | Giovanni Lonardi | Morthen Wang Baksaas | Guillermo Thomas Silva | Unibet Rose Rockets |
| Final | | Guillermo Thomas Silva | Giovanni Lonardi | Morthen Wang Baksaas | Guillermo Thomas Silva | Unibet Rose Rockets |

== Classification standings ==
Legend
| Denotes the winner of the general classification | Denotes the winner of the points classification |
| Denotes the winner of the mountains classification | Denotes the winner of the young rider classification |

=== General classification ===
Final general classification (1–10)
| Rank | Rider | Team | Time |
|---|---|---|---|
| 1 | Guillermo Thomas Silva (URU) | XDS Astana Team | 15h 34' 12" |
| 2 | Lennert Van Eetvelt (BEL) | Lotto–Intermarché | + 14" |
| 3 | Alessandro Pinarello (ITA) | NSN Cycling Team | + 25" |
| 4 | Felix Engelhardt (GER) | Team Jayco–AlUla | + 35" |
| 5 | Sebastian Berwick (AUS) | Caja Rural–Seguros RGA | + 36" |
| 6 | Thomas Bonnet (FRA) | Team TotalEnergies | + 39" |
| 7 | Wout Poels (NED) | Unibet Rose Rockets | + 40" |
| 8 | Cedrik Bakke Christophersen (NOR) | Unibet Rose Rockets | + 42" |
| 9 | Joris Delbove (FRA) | Team TotalEnergies | + 44" |
| 10 | Johannes Kulset (NOR) | Uno-X Mobility | + 55" |

=== Points classification ===
Final points classification (1–10)
| Rank | Rider | Team | Points |
|---|---|---|---|
| 1 | Giovanni Lonardi (ITA) | Team Polti VisitMalta | 45 |
| 2 | Erlend Blikra (NOR) | Uno-X Mobility | 43 |
| 3 | Ethan Vernon (GBR) | NSN Cycling Team | 38 |
| 4 | Riley Pickrell (CAN) | Modern Adventure Pro Cycling | 38 |
| 5 | Jason Tesson (FRA) | Team TotalEnergies | 36 |
| 6 | Guillermo Thomas Silva (URU) | XDS Astana Team | 31 |
| 7 | Nikiforos Arvanitou (GRE) | XDS Astana Team | 24 |
| 8 | Anders Foldager (DEN) | Team Jayco–AlUla | 22 |
| 9 | Lennert Van Eetvelt (BEL) | Lotto–Intermarché | 20 |
| 10 | Alessandro Pinarello (ITA) | NSN Cycling Team | 16 |

=== Mountains classification ===
Final mountains classification (1–10)
| Rank | Rider | Team | Points |
|---|---|---|---|
| 1 | Morthen Wang Baksaas (NOR) | Lucky Sport Cycling Team | 13 |
| 2 | Eirik Vang Aas (NOR) | Team Drali–Repsol | 12 |
| 3 | Guillermo Thomas Silva (URU) | XDS Astana Team | 11 |
| 4 | Anders Foldager (DEN) | Team Jayco–AlUla | 9 |
| 5 | Axel Källberg (FIN) | Lucky Sport Cycling Team | 7 |
| 6 | Lennert Van Eetvelt (BEL) | Lotto–Intermarché | 7 |
| 7 | Cedrik Bakke Christophersen (NOR) | Unibet Rose Rockets | 5 |
| 8 | Alessandro Pinarello (ITA) | NSN Cycling Team | 5 |
| 9 | Henrik Pedersen (DEN) | Uno-X Mobility | 5 |
| 10 | Ludvik Holstad (NOR) | Team Ringerike | 4 |

=== Young rider classification ===
Final young rider classification (1–10)
| Rank | Rider | Team | Time |
|---|---|---|---|
| 1 | Guillermo Thomas Silva (URU) | XDS Astana Team | 15h 34' 12" |
| 2 | Lennert Van Eetvelt (BEL) | Lotto–Intermarché | + 14" |
| 3 | Alessandro Pinarello (ITA) | NSN Cycling Team | + 25" |
| 4 | Cedrik Bakke Christophersen (NOR) | Unibet Rose Rockets | + 42" |
| 5 | Johannes Kulset (NOR) | Uno-X Mobility | + 55" |
| 6 | Robbe Dhondt (BEL) | Team Picnic–PostNL | + 1' 06" |
| 7 | Ludovico Crescioli (ITA) | Team Polti VisitMalta | + 1' 14" |
| 8 | Kevin Andre Sandli Messel (NOR) | Team Ringerike | + 1' 24" |
| 9 | Louis Sutton (GBR) | Euskaltel–Euskadi | + 2' 02" |
| 10 | Dario Giuliano (FRA) | Team Polti VisitMalta | + 2' 13" |

=== Team classification ===
Final team classification (1–10)
| Rank | Team | Time |
|---|---|---|
| 1 | (France) Unibet Rose Rockets | 46h 45' 58" |
| 2 | (France) Team TotalEnergies | + 35" |
| 3 | (Spain) Euskaltel–Euskadi | + 1' 24" |
| 4 | (Spain) Caja Rural–Seguros RGA | + 2' 17" |
| 5 | (Italy) Team Polti VisitMalta | + 3' 34" |
| 6 | (Netherlands) Team Picnic–PostNL | + 4' 21" |
| 7 | (Belgium) Team Flanders–Baloise | + 4' 39" |
| 8 | (Switzerland) Pinarello–Q36.5 Pro Cycling Team | + 4' 43" |
| 9 | (Australia) Team Jayco–AlUla | + 4' 45" |
| 10 | (Norway) Uno-X Mobility | + 6' 12" |
