= 2026 Tour of the Alps =

Cycling race

2026 UCI ProSeries

Race details
- Dates: 20–24 April 2026
- Stages: 5
- Distance: 762.7 km (473.9 mi)
- Winning time: 19h 01' 52"

Results
Jersey awarded to the overall winner	Winner	Giulio Pellizzari (ITA)	(Red Bull–Bora–Hansgrohe)
	Second	Egan Bernal (COL)	(INEOS Grenadiers)
	Third	Thymen Arensman (NED)	(INEOS Grenadiers)
Jersey awarded to the points classification winner	Points	Tommaso Dati (ITA)	(Team Ukyo)
Jersey awarded to the mountains classification winner	Mountains	Lennart Jasch (GER)	(Tudor Pro Cycling Team)
Jersey awarded to the youth classification winner	Youth	Giulio Pellizzari (ITA)	(Red Bull–Bora–Hansgrohe)
	Team	(Germany) Red Bull–Bora–Hansgrohe	

The 2026 Tour of the Alps was a road cycling stage race that took place between 20 and 24 April 2026 in the Austrian state of Tyrol and in the Italian provinces of Trentino and South Tyrol, which all make up the Tyrol–South Tyrol–Trentino Euroregion. The race is rated as a category 2.Pro event on the 2026 UCI ProSeries calendar, and was the 49th edition of the Tour of the Alps.

The race was won by Italian rider Giulio Pellizzari of Red Bull–Bora–Hansgrohe for the first time, with Pellizzari winning stages 2 and 5 on his way to victory. Pellizzari also took the young rider classification.

== Teams ==
Seven UCI WorldTeams, six UCI ProTeams, two UCI Continental teams and two national teams made up the seventeen teams that participated in the race.

UCI WorldTeams

- EF Education–EasyPost
- INEOS Grenadiers
- Lidl–Trek
- Red Bull–Bora–Hansgrohe
- Team Bahrain Victorious
- Team Jayco–AlUla
- Team Picnic–PostNL

UCI ProTeams

- Bardiani–CSF 7 Saber
- MBH Bank CSB Telecom Fort
- Pinarello–Q36.5 Pro Cycling Team
- Solution Tech NIPPO Rali
- Team Polti VisitMalta
- Tudor Pro Cycling Team

UCI Continental Teams

- Team Ukyo
- Team Vorarlberg

National teams

- Austria
- Italy

== Route ==
Stage characteristics and winners
Stage	Date	Course	Distance	Type	Stage winner
1	20 April	Innsbruck (Austria) to Innsbruck (Austria)	144.3 km (89.7 mi)	Hilly stage	Tommaso Dati (ITA)
2	21 April	Telfs (Austria) to Martell/Val Martello (Italy)	147.5 km (91.7 mi)	Intermediate stage	Giulio Pellizzari (ITA)
3	22 April	Latsch/Laces (Italy) to Arco (Italy)	174.5 km (108.4 mi)	Intermediate stage	Tom Pidcock (GBR)
4	23 April	Arco (Italy) to Trento (Italy)	167.8 km (104.3 mi)	Mountain stage	Lennart Jasch (GER)
5	24 April	Trento (Italy) to Bozen/Bolzano (Italy)	128.6 km (79.9 mi)	Intermediate stage	Giulio Pellizzari (ITA)
Total			762.7 km (473.9 mi)		

== Stages ==
=== Stage 1 ===
20 April 2026 – Innsbruck (Austria) to Innsbruck (Austria), 144.3 km (89.7 mi)

Stage 1 Result
Rank	Rider	Team	Time
1	Tommaso Dati (ITA)	Team Ukyo	3h 21' 35"
2	Tom Pidcock (GBR)	Pinarello–Q36.5 Pro Cycling Team	+ 0"
3	Florian Stork (GER)	Tudor Pro Cycling Team	+ 0"
4	Gabriele Bessega (ITA)	Team Polti VisitMalta	+ 0"
5	Federico Iacomoni (ITA)	Team Ukyo	+ 0"
6	Felix Engelhardt (GER)	Team Jayco–AlUla	+ 0"
7	Andrea Pietrobon (ITA)	Team Polti VisitMalta	+ 0"
8	Leonardo Vesco (ITA)	Italy	+ 0"
9	Sean Quinn (USA)	EF Education–EasyPost	+ 0"
10	Aleksandr Vlasov	Red Bull–Bora–Hansgrohe	+ 0"

General classification after Stage 1
Rank	Rider	Team	Time
1	Tommaso Dati (ITA)	Team Ukyo	3h 21' 25"
2	Tom Pidcock (GBR)	Pinarello–Q36.5 Pro Cycling Team	+ 4"
3	Florian Stork (GER)	Tudor Pro Cycling Team	+ 6"
4	Ben O'Connor (AUS)	Team Jayco–AlUla	+ 8"
5	Gabriele Bessega (ITA)	Team Polti VisitMalta	+ 10"
6	Federico Iacomoni (ITA)	Team Ukyo	+ 10"
7	Felix Engelhardt (GER)	Team Jayco–AlUla	+ 10"
8	Andrea Pietrobon (ITA)	Team Polti VisitMalta	+ 10"
9	Leonardo Vesco (ITA)	Italy	+ 10"
10	Sean Quinn (USA)	EF Education–EasyPost	+ 10"

=== Stage 2 ===
21 April 2026 – Telfs (Austria) to Martell/Val Martello (Italy), 147.5 km (91.7 mi)

Stage 2 Result
Rank	Rider	Team	Time
1	Giulio Pellizzari (ITA)	Red Bull–Bora–Hansgrohe	3h 28' 17"
2	Thymen Arensman (NED)	INEOS Grenadiers	+ 0"
3	Mattia Gaffuri (ITA)	Team Picnic–PostNL	+ 0"
4	Egan Bernal (COL)	INEOS Grenadiers	+ 0"
5	Aleksandr Vlasov	Red Bull–Bora–Hansgrohe	+ 0"
6	Lorenzo Finn (ITA)	Red Bull–Bora–Hansgrohe	+ 3"
7	Mathys Rondel (FRA)	Tudor Pro Cycling Team	+ 9"
8	Chris Harper (AUS)	Pinarello–Q36.5 Pro Cycling Team	+ 19"
9	Alex Tolio (ITA)	Bardiani–CSF 7 Saber	+ 19"
10	Michael Storer (AUS)	Tudor Pro Cycling Team	+ 19"

General classification after Stage 2
Rank	Rider	Team	Time
1	Giulio Pellizzari (ITA)	Red Bull–Bora–Hansgrohe	6h 49' 42"
2	Thymen Arensman (NED)	INEOS Grenadiers	+ 4"
3	Mattia Gaffuri (ITA)	Team Picnic–PostNL	+ 6"
4	Aleksandr Vlasov	Red Bull–Bora–Hansgrohe	+ 10"
5	Egan Bernal (COL)	INEOS Grenadiers	+ 10"
6	Lorenzo Finn (ITA)	Red Bull–Bora–Hansgrohe	+ 13"
7	Mathys Rondel (FRA)	Tudor Pro Cycling Team	+ 19"
8	Jakob Omrzel (SLO)	Team Bahrain Victorious	+ 29"
9	Chris Harper (AUS)	Pinarello–Q36.5 Pro Cycling Team	+ 29"
10	Alex Tolio (ITA)	Bardiani–CSF 7 Saber	+ 29"

=== Stage 3 ===
22 April 2026 – Latsch/Laces (Italy) to Arco (Italy), 174.5 km (108.4 mi)

Stage 3 Result
Rank	Rider	Team	Time
1	Tom Pidcock (GBR)	Pinarello–Q36.5 Pro Cycling Team	4h 23' 24"
2	Tommaso Dati (ITA)	Team Ukyo	+ 0"
3	Egan Bernal (COL)	INEOS Grenadiers	+ 0"
4	Luca Paletti (ITA)	Bardiani–CSF 7 Saber	+ 0"
5	Aleksandr Vlasov	Red Bull–Bora–Hansgrohe	+ 0"
6	Sean Quinn (USA)	EF Education–EasyPost	+ 0"
7	Chris Hamilton (AUS)	Team Picnic–PostNL	+ 0"
8	Jakob Omrzel (SLO)	Team Bahrain Victorious	+ 0"
9	Florian Stork (GER)	Tudor Pro Cycling Team	+ 0"
10	Ben O'Connor (AUS)	Team Jayco–AlUla	+ 0"

General classification after Stage 3
Rank	Rider	Team	Time
1	Giulio Pellizzari (ITA)	Red Bull–Bora–Hansgrohe	11h 13' 06"
2	Thymen Arensman (NED)	INEOS Grenadiers	+ 4"
3	Egan Bernal (COL)	INEOS Grenadiers	+ 6"
4	Mattia Gaffuri (ITA)	Team Picnic–PostNL	+ 6"
5	Aleksandr Vlasov	Red Bull–Bora–Hansgrohe	+ 10"
6	Mathys Rondel (FRA)	Tudor Pro Cycling Team	+ 19"
7	Jakob Omrzel (SLO)	Team Bahrain Victorious	+ 29"
8	Chris Harper (AUS)	Pinarello–Q36.5 Pro Cycling Team	+ 29"
9	Alex Tolio (ITA)	Bardiani–CSF 7 Saber	+ 29"
10	Michael Storer (AUS)	Tudor Pro Cycling Team	+ 29"

=== Stage 4 ===
23 April 2026 – Arco (Italy) to Trento (Italy), 167.8 km (104.3 mi)

Stage 4 Result
Rank	Rider	Team	Time
1	Lennart Jasch (GER)	Tudor Pro Cycling Team	4h 28' 06"
2	Matteo Sobrero (ITA)	Lidl–Trek	+ 10"
3	Federico Iacomoni (ITA)	Team Ukyo	+ 11"
4	Florian Stork (GER)	Tudor Pro Cycling Team	+ 20"
5	Thymen Arensman (NED)	INEOS Grenadiers	+ 20"
6	Aleksandr Vlasov	Red Bull–Bora–Hansgrohe	+ 20"
7	Tom Pidcock (GBR)	Pinarello–Q36.5 Pro Cycling Team	+ 20"
8	Jakob Omrzel (SLO)	Team Bahrain Victorious	+ 20"
9	Embret Svestad-Bårdseng (NOR)	INEOS Grenadiers	+ 20"
10	Egan Bernal (COL)	INEOS Grenadiers	+ 20"

General classification after Stage 4
Rank	Rider	Team	Time
1	Giulio Pellizzari (ITA)	Red Bull–Bora–Hansgrohe	15h 41' 32"
2	Thymen Arensman (NED)	INEOS Grenadiers	+ 4"
3	Egan Bernal (COL)	INEOS Grenadiers	+ 4"
4	Aleksandr Vlasov	Red Bull–Bora–Hansgrohe	+ 6"
5	Mattia Gaffuri (ITA)	Team Picnic–PostNL	+ 15"
6	Mathys Rondel (FRA)	Tudor Pro Cycling Team	+ 19"
7	Jakob Omrzel (SLO)	Team Bahrain Victorious	+ 29"
8	Chris Harper (AUS)	Pinarello–Q36.5 Pro Cycling Team	+ 29"
9	Alex Tolio (ITA)	Bardiani–CSF 7 Saber	+ 29"
10	Michael Storer (AUS)	Tudor Pro Cycling Team	+ 29"

=== Stage 5 ===
24 April 2026 – Trento (Italy) to Bozen/Bolzano (Italy), 128.6 km (79.9 mi)

Stage 5 Result
Rank	Rider	Team	Time
1	Giulio Pellizzari (ITA)	Red Bull–Bora–Hansgrohe	3h 20' 36"
2	Egan Bernal (COL)	INEOS Grenadiers	+ 30"
3	Michael Storer (AUS)	Tudor Pro Cycling Team	+ 30"
4	Thymen Arensman (NED)	INEOS Grenadiers	+ 30"
5	Jakob Omrzel (SLO)	Team Bahrain Victorious	+ 1' 10"
6	Chris Harper (AUS)	Pinarello–Q36.5 Pro Cycling Team	+ 1' 10"
7	Ben O'Connor (AUS)	Team Jayco–AlUla	+ 1' 10"
8	Mathys Rondel (FRA)	Tudor Pro Cycling Team	+ 1' 10"
9	Giovanni Aleotti (ITA)	Red Bull–Bora–Hansgrohe	+ 2' 20"
10	Jefferson Alexander Cepeda (ECU)	EF Education–EasyPost	+ 2' 22"

General classification after Stage 5
Rank	Rider	Team	Time
1	Giulio Pellizzari (ITA)	Red Bull–Bora–Hansgrohe	19h 01' 52"
2	Egan Bernal (COL)	INEOS Grenadiers	+ 40"
3	Thymen Arensman (NED)	INEOS Grenadiers	+ 50"
4	Michael Storer (AUS)	Tudor Pro Cycling Team	+ 1' 09"
5	Mathys Rondel (FRA)	Tudor Pro Cycling Team	+ 1' 45"
6	Jakob Omrzel (SLO)	Team Bahrain Victorious	+ 1' 55"
7	Chris Harper (AUS)	Pinarello–Q36.5 Pro Cycling Team	+ 1' 55"
8	Ben O'Connor (AUS)	Team Jayco–AlUla	+ 1' 59"
9	Aleksandr Vlasov	Red Bull–Bora–Hansgrohe	+ 2' 51"
10	Giovanni Aleotti (ITA)	Red Bull–Bora–Hansgrohe	+ 3' 11"

== Classification leadership table ==
Classification leadership by stage
Stage	Winner	General classification	Points classification	Mountains classification	Young rider classification	Team classification
1	Tommaso Dati	Tommaso Dati	Tommaso Dati	Emanuel Zangerle	Gabriele Bessega	Team Polti VisitMalta
2	Giulio Pellizzari	Giulio Pellizzari	Giulio Pellizzari	Emanuel Zangerle	Giulio Pellizzari	Red Bull–Bora–Hansgrohe
3	Tom Pidcock	Giulio Pellizzari	Tom Pidcock	Emanuel Zangerle	Giulio Pellizzari	Red Bull–Bora–Hansgrohe
4	Lennart Jasch	Giulio Pellizzari	Tom Pidcock	Sean Quinn	Giulio Pellizzari	Red Bull–Bora–Hansgrohe
5	Giulio Pellizzari	Giulio Pellizzari	Tommaso Dati	Lennart Jasch	Giulio Pellizzari	Red Bull–Bora–Hansgrohe
Final		Giulio Pellizzari	Tommaso Dati	Lennart Jasch	Giulio Pellizzari	Red Bull–Bora–Hansgrohe

== Classification standings ==
Legend
Denotes the winner of the general classification	Denotes the winner of the mountains classification
Denotes the winner of the points classification	Denotes the winner of the young rider classification

=== General classification ===
Final general classification (1–10)
Rank	Rider	Team	Time
1	Giulio Pellizzari (ITA)	Red Bull–Bora–Hansgrohe	19h 01' 52"
2	Egan Bernal (COL)	INEOS Grenadiers	+ 40"
3	Thymen Arensman (NED)	INEOS Grenadiers	+ 50"
4	Michael Storer (AUS)	Tudor Pro Cycling Team	+ 1' 09"
5	Mathys Rondel (FRA)	Tudor Pro Cycling Team	+ 1' 45"
6	Jakob Omrzel (SLO)	Team Bahrain Victorious	+ 1' 55"
7	Chris Harper (AUS)	Pinarello–Q36.5 Pro Cycling Team	+ 1' 55"
8	Ben O'Connor (AUS)	Team Jayco–AlUla	+ 1' 59"
9	Aleksandr Vlasov	Red Bull–Bora–Hansgrohe	+ 2' 51"
10	Giovanni Aleotti (ITA)	Red Bull–Bora–Hansgrohe	+ 3' 11"

=== Points classification ===
Final points classification (1–10)
Rank	Rider	Team	Points
1	Tommaso Dati (ITA)	Team Ukyo	53
2	Tom Pidcock (GBR)	Pinarello–Q36.5 Pro Cycling Team	53
3	Giulio Pellizzari (ITA)	Red Bull–Bora–Hansgrohe	50
4	Lennart Jasch (GER)	Tudor Pro Cycling Team	39
5	Egan Bernal (COL)	INEOS Grenadiers	39
6	Thymen Arensman (NED)	INEOS Grenadiers	32
7	Sean Quinn (USA)	EF Education–EasyPost	23
8	Florian Stork (GER)	Tudor Pro Cycling Team	22
9	Sam Oomen (NED)	Lidl–Trek	20
10	Aleksandr Vlasov	Red Bull–Bora–Hansgrohe	18

=== Mountains classification ===
Final mountains classification (1–10)
Rank	Rider	Team	Points
1	Lennart Jasch (GER)	Tudor Pro Cycling Team	22
2	Sean Quinn (USA)	EF Education–EasyPost	20
3	Darren Rafferty (IRL)	EF Education–EasyPost	16
4	Juan Felipe Rodriguez (COL)	EF Education–EasyPost	14
5	Sam Oomen (NED)	Lidl–Trek	12
6	Davide Bais (ITA)	Team Polti VisitMalta	11
7	Tom Pidcock (GBR)	Pinarello–Q36.5 Pro Cycling Team	8
8	Rainer Kepplinger (AUT)	Team Bahrain Victorious	8
9	Peter Øxenberg (DEN)	INEOS Grenadiers	6
10	Ben Zwiehoff (GER)	Red Bull–Bora–Hansgrohe	6

=== Young rider classification ===
Final young rider classification (1–10)
Rank	Rider	Team	Time
1	Giulio Pellizzari (ITA)	Red Bull–Bora–Hansgrohe	19h 01' 52"
2	Mathys Rondel (FRA)	Tudor Pro Cycling Team	+ 1' 45"
3	Jakob Omrzel (SLO)	Team Bahrain Victorious	+ 1' 55"
4	Juan Felipe Rodriguez (COL)	EF Education–EasyPost	+ 7' 07"
5	Darren Rafferty (IRL)	EF Education–EasyPost	+ 8' 49"
6	Luca Paletti (ITA)	Bardiani–CSF 7 Saber	+ 9' 04"
7	Filip Gruszczyński (POL)	MBH Bank CSB Telecom Fort	+ 18' 17"
8	Peter Øxenberg (DEN)	INEOS Grenadiers	+ 21' 19"
9	Matteo Vanhuffel (BEL)	Team Picnic–PostNL	+ 23' 55"
10	Finlay Pickering (GBR)	Team Bahrain Victorious	+ 25' 18"

=== Team classification ===
Final team classification (1–10)
Rank	Team	Time
1	(Germany) Red Bull–Bora–Hansgrohe	57h 11' 46"
2	(United Kingdom) INEOS Grenadiers	+ 38"
3	(Switzerland) Tudor Pro Cycling Team	+ 6' 19"
4	(United States) EF Education–EasyPost	+ 10' 20"
5	(Italy) Bardiani–CSF 7 Saber	+ 16' 37"
6	(Australia) Team Jayco–AlUla	+ 16' 47"
7	(Switzerland) Pinarello–Q36.5 Pro Cycling Team	+ 26' 23"
8	(Netherlands) Team Picnic–PostNL	+ 26' 37"
9	(Germany) Lidl–Trek	+ 27' 54"
10	(Hungary) MBH Bank CSB Telecom Fort	+ 39' 34"
