= 2024 Tour of the Alps =

Cycling race

2024 UCI ProSeries

Race details
- Dates: 15–19 April 2024
- Stages: 5
- Distance: 708.7 km (440.4 mi)
- Winning time: 18h 20' 43"

Results
Jersey awarded to the overall winner	Winner	Juan Pedro López (ESP)	(Lidl–Trek)
	Second	Ben O'Connor (AUS)	(Decathlon–AG2R La Mondiale)
	Third	Antonio Tiberi (ITA)	(Team Bahrain Victorious)
Jersey awarded to the points classification winner	Points	Tobias Foss (NOR)	(Ineos Grenadiers)
Jersey awarded to the mountains classification winner	Mountains	Simon Carr (GBR)	(EF Education–EasyPost)
Jersey awarded to the youth classification winner	Youth	Antonio Tiberi (ITA)	(Team Bahrain Victorious)
	Team	Team Bahrain Victorious	

The 2024 Tour of the Alps is a road cycling stage race that took place between 15 and 19 April 2024 in the Austrian state of Tyrol and in the Italian provinces of Trentino and South Tyrol, which all make up the Tyrol–South Tyrol–Trentino Euroregion. The race is rated as a category 2.Pro event on the 2024 UCI ProSeries calendar, and is the 47th edition of the Tour of the Alps.

== Teams ==
Nine UCI WorldTeams, seven UCI ProTeams, one UCI Continental team and Austrian national team made up the 18 teams that participated in the race.

UCI WorldTeams

- Bora–Hansgrohe
- Decathlon–AG2R La Mondiale
- EF Education–EasyPost
- Ineos Grenadiers
- Lidl–Trek
- Movistar Team
- Team Bahrain Victorious
- Team dsm–firmenich PostNL
- Team Jayco–AlUla

UCI ProTeams

- Equipo Kern Pharma
- Euskaltel–Euskadi
- Polti–Kometa
- TDT–Unibet Cycling Team
- Team Corratec–Vini Fantini
- Tudor Pro Cycling Team
- VF Group–Bardiani–CSF–Faizanè

UCI Continental Teams

- JCL Team Ukyo

National teams

- Austria

== Route ==
Stage characteristics and winners
Stage	Date	Course	Distance	Type	Stage winner
1	15 April	Neumarkt (Italy) to Kurtinig (Italy)	133.3 km (82.8 mi)	Intermediate stage	Tobias Foss (NOR)
2	16 April	Salurn (Italy) to Stans (Austria)	190.7 km (118.5 mi)	Intermediate stage	Alessandro De Marchi (ITA)
3	17 April	Schwaz (Austria) to Schwaz (Austria)	124.8 km (77.5 mi)	Intermediate stage	Juan Pedro López (ESP)
4	18 April	Leifers (Italy) to Borgo Valsugana (Italy)	141.3 km (87.8 mi)	Mountain stage	Simon Carr (GBR)
5	19 April	Levico Terme (Italy) to Levico Terme (Italy)	118.6 km (73.7 mi)	Intermediate stage	Aurélien Paret-Peintre (FRA)
Total			708.7 km (440.4 mi)		

== Stages ==
=== Stage 1 ===
15 April 2024 – Neumarkt to Kurtinig, 133.3 km (82.8 mi)

Stage 1 Result
Rank	Rider	Team	Time
1	Tobias Foss (NOR)	Ineos Grenadiers	3h 17' 06"
2	Chris Harper (AUS)	Team Jayco–AlUla	+ 0"
3	Esteban Chaves (COL)	EF Education–EasyPost	+ 0"
4	Ben O'Connor (AUS)	Decathlon–AG2R La Mondiale	+ 0"
5	Juan Pedro López (ESP)	Lidl–Trek	+ 3"
6	Geraint Thomas (GBR)	Ineos Grenadiers	+ 3"
7	Antonio Tiberi (ITA)	Team Bahrain Victorious	+ 3"
8	Amanuel Ghebreigzabhier (ERI)	Lidl–Trek	+ 3"
9	Romain Bardet (FRA)	Team dsm–firmenich PostNL	+ 3"
10	Valentin Paret-Peintre (FRA)	Decathlon–AG2R La Mondiale	+ 3"

General classification after Stage 1
Rank	Rider	Team	Time
1	Tobias Foss (NOR)	Ineos Grenadiers	3h 16' 56"
2	Chris Harper (AUS)	Team Jayco–AlUla	+ 4"
3	Esteban Chaves (COL)	EF Education–EasyPost	+ 6"
4	Ben O'Connor (AUS)	Decathlon–AG2R La Mondiale	+ 10"
5	Juan Pedro López (ESP)	Lidl–Trek	+ 13"
6	Geraint Thomas (GBR)	Ineos Grenadiers	+ 13"
7	Antonio Tiberi (ITA)	Team Bahrain Victorious	+ 13"
8	Amanuel Ghebreigzabhier (ERI)	Lidl–Trek	+ 13"
9	Romain Bardet (FRA)	Team dsm–firmenich PostNL	+ 13"
10	Valentin Paret-Peintre (FRA)	Decathlon–AG2R La Mondiale	+ 13"

=== Stage 2 ===
16 April 2024 – Salurn to Stans, 190.7 km (118.5 mi)

Stage 2 Result
Rank	Rider	Team	Time
1	Alessandro De Marchi (ITA)	Team Jayco–AlUla	4h 47' 37"
2	Patrick Gamper (AUT)	Bora–Hansgrohe	+ 1' 20"
3	Simon Pellaud (SUI)	Tudor Pro Cycling Team	+ 1' 24"
4	Gregor Mühlberger (AUT)	Movistar Team	+ 1' 47"
5	Joan Bou (ESP)	Euskaltel–Euskadi	+ 1' 47"
6	Fabio Felline (ITA)	Lidl–Trek	+ 1' 47"
7	Antonio Tiberi (ITA)	Team Bahrain Victorious	+ 1' 47"
8	Wout Poels (NED)	Team Bahrain Victorious	+ 1' 47"
9	Tom Donnenwirth (FRA)	Decathlon–AG2R La Mondiale	+ 1' 47"
10	Romain Bardet (FRA)	Team dsm–firmenich PostNL	+ 1' 47"

General classification after Stage 2
Rank	Rider	Team	Time
1	Tobias Foss (NOR)	Ineos Grenadiers	8h 06' 20"
2	Chris Harper (AUS)	Team Jayco–AlUla	+ 4"
3	Esteban Chaves (COL)	EF Education–EasyPost	+ 6"
4	Ben O'Connor (AUS)	Decathlon–AG2R La Mondiale	+ 10"
5	Antonio Tiberi (ITA)	Team Bahrain Victorious	+ 13"
6	Wout Poels (NED)	Team Bahrain Victorious	+ 13"
7	Romain Bardet (FRA)	Team dsm–firmenich PostNL	+ 13"
8	Geraint Thomas (GBR)	Ineos Grenadiers	+ 13"
9	Amanuel Ghebreigzabhier (ERI)	Lidl–Trek	+ 13"
10	Valentin Paret-Peintre (FRA)	Decathlon–AG2R La Mondiale	+ 13"

=== Stage 3 ===
17 April 2024 – Schwaz to Schwaz, 124.8 km (77.5 mi)

Stage 3 Result
Rank	Rider	Team	Time
1	Juan Pedro López (ESP)	Lidl–Trek	3h 16' 11"
2	Giulio Pellizzari (ITA)	VF Group–Bardiani–CSF–Faizanè	+ 22"
3	Tobias Foss (NOR)	Ineos Grenadiers	+ 38"
4	Romain Bardet (FRA)	Team dsm–firmenich PostNL	+ 38"
5	Aurélien Paret-Peintre (FRA)	Decathlon–AG2R La Mondiale	+ 38"
6	Antonio Tiberi (ITA)	Team Bahrain Victorious	+ 38"
7	Wout Poels (NED)	Team Bahrain Victorious	+ 38"
8	Ben O'Connor (AUS)	Decathlon–AG2R La Mondiale	+ 38"
9	Valentin Paret-Peintre (FRA)	Decathlon–AG2R La Mondiale	+ 38"
10	Iván Sosa (COL)	Movistar Team	+ 38"

General classification after Stage 3
Rank	Rider	Team	Time
1	Juan Pedro López (ESP)	Lidl–Trek	11h 22' 34"
2	Tobias Foss (NOR)	Ineos Grenadiers	+ 31"
3	Ben O'Connor (AUS)	Decathlon–AG2R La Mondiale	+ 45"
4	Antonio Tiberi (ITA)	Team Bahrain Victorious	+ 48"
5	Romain Bardet (FRA)	Team dsm–firmenich PostNL	+ 48"
6	Wout Poels (NED)	Team Bahrain Victorious	+ 48"
7	Valentin Paret-Peintre (FRA)	Decathlon–AG2R La Mondiale	+ 48"
8	Giulio Pellizzari (ITA)	VF Group–Bardiani–CSF–Faizanè	+ 57"
9	Aurélien Paret-Peintre (FRA)	Decathlon–AG2R La Mondiale	+ 1' 19"
10	Iván Sosa (COL)	Movistar Team	+ 1' 19"

=== Stage 4 ===
18 April 2024 – Leifers to Borgo Valsugana, 141.3 km (87.8 mi)

Stage 4 Result
Rank	Rider	Team	Time
1	Simon Carr (GBR)	EF Education–EasyPost	4h 06' 27"
2	Michael Storer (AUS)	Tudor Pro Cycling Team	+ 1' 19"
3	Ben O'Connor (AUS)	Decathlon–AG2R La Mondiale	+ 1' 19"
4	Wout Poels (NED)	Team Bahrain Victorious	+ 1' 22"
5	Valentin Paret-Peintre (FRA)	Decathlon–AG2R La Mondiale	+ 1' 22"
6	Antonio Tiberi (ITA)	Team Bahrain Victorious	+ 1' 22"
7	Romain Bardet (FRA)	Team dsm–firmenich PostNL	+ 1' 22"
8	Juan Pedro López (ESP)	Lidl–Trek	+ 1' 22"
9	Giulio Pellizzari (ITA)	VF Group–Bardiani–CSF–Faizanè	+ 2' 19"
10	Georg Steinhauser (GER)	EF Education–EasyPost	+ 2' 19"

General classification after Stage 4
Rank	Rider	Team	Time
1	Juan Pedro López (ESP)	Lidl–Trek	15h 30' 23"
2	Ben O'Connor (AUS)	Decathlon–AG2R La Mondiale	+ 38"
3	Antonio Tiberi (ITA)	Team Bahrain Victorious	+ 48"
4	Wout Poels (NED)	Team Bahrain Victorious	+ 48"
5	Romain Bardet (FRA)	Team dsm–firmenich PostNL	+ 48"
6	Valentin Paret-Peintre (FRA)	Decathlon–AG2R La Mondiale	+ 48"
7	Michael Storer (AUS)	Tudor Pro Cycling Team	+ 1' 40"
8	Giulio Pellizzari (ITA)	VF Group–Bardiani–CSF–Faizanè	+ 1' 54"
9	Iván Sosa (COL)	Movistar Team	+ 2' 52"
10	Davide Piganzoli (ITA)	Polti–Kometa	+ 2' 58"

=== Stage 5 ===
19 April 2024 – Levico Terme to Levico Terme, 118.6 km (73.7 mi)

Stage 5 Result
Rank	Rider	Team	Time
1	Aurélien Paret-Peintre (FRA)	Decathlon–AG2R La Mondiale	2h 50' 20"
2	Antonio Tiberi (ITA)	Team Bahrain Victorious	+ 0"
3	Valentin Paret-Peintre (FRA)	Decathlon–AG2R La Mondiale	+ 0"
4	Romain Bardet (FRA)	Team dsm–firmenich PostNL	+ 0"
5	Wout Poels (NED)	Team Bahrain Victorious	+ 0"
6	Filippo Zana (ITA)	Decathlon–AG2R La Mondiale	+ 0"
7	Óscar Rodríguez (ESP)	Ineos Grenadiers	+ 0"
8	Matteo Fabbro (ITA)	Polti–Kometa	+ 0"
9	Juan Pedro López (ESP)	Lidl–Trek	+ 0"
10	Michael Storer (AUS)	Tudor Pro Cycling Team	+ 0"

General classification after Stage 5
Rank	Rider	Team	Time
1	Juan Pedro López (ESP)	Lidl–Trek	18h 20' 43"
2	Ben O'Connor (AUS)	Decathlon–AG2R La Mondiale	+ 38"
3	Antonio Tiberi (ITA)	Team Bahrain Victorious	+ 42"
4	Valentin Paret-Peintre (FRA)	Decathlon–AG2R La Mondiale	+ 44"
5	Romain Bardet (FRA)	Team dsm–firmenich PostNL	+ 48"
6	Wout Poels (NED)	Team Bahrain Victorious	+ 48"
7	Michael Storer (AUS)	Tudor Pro Cycling Team	+ 1' 40"
8	Giulio Pellizzari (ITA)	VF Group–Bardiani–CSF–Faizanè	+ 1' 54"
9	Iván Sosa (COL)	Movistar Team	+ 2' 55"
10	Davide Piganzoli (ITA)	Polti–Kometa	+ 2' 58"

== Classification leadership table ==
Classification leadership by stage
Stage	Winner	General classification	Points classification	Mountains classification	Young rider classification	Team classification
1	Tobias Foss	Tobias Foss	Tobias Foss	Mattia Bais	Antonio Tiberi	Ineos Grenadiers
2	Alessandro De Marchi	Tobias Foss	Alessandro De Marchi	Mattia Bais	Antonio Tiberi	Team Jayco–AlUla
3	Juan Pedro López	Juan Pedro López	Tobias Foss	Mattia Bais	Antonio Tiberi	Decathlon–AG2R La Mondiale
4	Simon Carr	Juan Pedro López	Tobias Foss	Simon Carr	Antonio Tiberi	Team Bahrain Victorious
5	Aurélien Paret-Peintre	Juan Pedro López	Tobias Foss	Simon Carr	Antonio Tiberi	Team Bahrain Victorious
Final		Juan Pedro López	Tobias Foss	Simon Carr	Antonio Tiberi	Team Bahrain Victorious

== Classification standings ==
Legend
Denotes the winner of the general classification	Denotes the winner of the mountains classification
Denotes the winner of the points classification	Denotes the winner of the young rider classification

=== General classification ===
Final general classification (1–10)
Rank	Rider	Team	Time
1	Juan Pedro López (ESP)	Lidl–Trek	18h 20' 43"
2	Ben O'Connor (AUS)	Decathlon–AG2R La Mondiale	+ 38"
3	Antonio Tiberi (ITA)	Team Bahrain Victorious	+ 42"
4	Valentin Paret-Peintre (FRA)	Decathlon–AG2R La Mondiale	+ 48"
5	Romain Bardet (FRA)	Team dsm–firmenich PostNL	+ 48"
6	Wout Poels (NED)	Team Bahrain Victorious	+ 48"
7	Michael Storer (AUS)	Tudor Pro Cycling Team	+ 1' 40"
8	Giulio Pellizzari (ITA)	VF Group–Bardiani–CSF–Faizanè	+ 1' 54"
9	Iván Sosa (COL)	Movistar Team	+ 2' 55"
10	Davide Piganzoli (ITA)	Polti–Kometa	+ 2' 58"

=== Points classification ===
Final points classification (1–10)
Rank	Rider	Team	Points
1	Tobias Foss (NOR)	Ineos Grenadiers	57
2	Antonio Tiberi (ITA)	Team Bahrain Victorious	42
3	Juan Pedro López (ESP)	Lidl–Trek	36
4	Simon Carr (GBR)	EF Education–EasyPost	35
5	Aurélien Paret-Peintre (FRA)	Decathlon–AG2R La Mondiale	31
6	Alessandro De Marchi (ITA)	Team Jayco–AlUla	31
7	Mattia Bais (ITA)	Polti–Kometa	30
8	Ben O'Connor (AUS)	Decathlon–AG2R La Mondiale	27
9	Filippo Ganna (ITA)	Ineos Grenadiers	26
10	Simon Pellaud (SUI)	Tudor Pro Cycling Team	26

=== Mountains classification ===
Final mountains classification (1–10)
Rank	Rider	Team	Points
1	Simon Carr (GBR)	EF Education–EasyPost	24
2	Wout Poels (NED)	Team Bahrain Victorious	20
3	Juan Pedro López (ESP)	Lidl–Trek	14
4	Hugh Carthy (GBR)	EF Education–EasyPost	10
5	Giulio Pellizzari (ITA)	VF Group–Bardiani–CSF–Faizanè	10
6	Mattia Bais (ITA)	Polti–Kometa	9
7	Geraint Thomas (GBR)	Ineos Grenadiers	8
8	Sergio Higuita (COL)	Bora–Hansgrohe	8
9	Aurélien Paret-Peintre (FRA)	Decathlon–AG2R La Mondiale	8
10	Luca Covili (ITA)	VF Group–Bardiani–CSF–Faizanè	8

=== Young rider classification ===
Final young rider classification (1–10)
Rank	Rider	Team	Time
1	Antonio Tiberi (ITA)	Team Bahrain Victorious	18h 21' 25"
2	Valentin Paret-Peintre (FRA)	Decathlon–AG2R La Mondiale	+ 2"
3	Giulio Pellizzari (ITA)	VF Group–Bardiani–CSF–Faizanè	+ 1' 12"
4	Davide Piganzoli (ITA)	Polti–Kometa	+ 2' 16"
5	Mathys Rondel (FRA)	Tudor Pro Cycling Team	+ 3' 35"
6	Jorge Gutiérrez (ESP)	Equipo Kern Pharma	+ 13' 19"
7	Nicolás Alustiza (ESP)	Euskaltel–Euskadi	+ 37' 47"
8	Robbe Dhondt (BEL)	Team dsm–firmenich PostNL	+ 46' 11"
9	Nils Aebersold (SUI)	Lidl–Trek	+ 46' 59"
10	Kilian Verschueren (FRA)	Decathlon–AG2R La Mondiale	+ 48' 48"

=== Team classification ===
Final team classification (1–10)
Rank	Team	Time
1	Team Bahrain Victorious	55h 13' 25"
2	(France) Decathlon–AG2R La Mondiale	+ 5' 55"
3	(Spain) Movistar Team	+ 21' 37"
4	(United Kingdom) Ineos Grenadiers	+ 26' 21"
5	(United States) Lidl–Trek	+ 26' 51"
6	(Switzerland) Tudor Pro Cycling Team	+ 28' 45"
7	(Spain) Euskaltel–Euskadi	+ 33' 50"
8	(Netherlands) Team dsm–firmenich PostNL	+ 34' 45"
9	(United States) EF Education–EasyPost	+ 34' 49"
10	(Spain) Equipo Kern Pharma	+ 37' 45"
