= Mathis Le Berre =

French cyclist (born 2001)

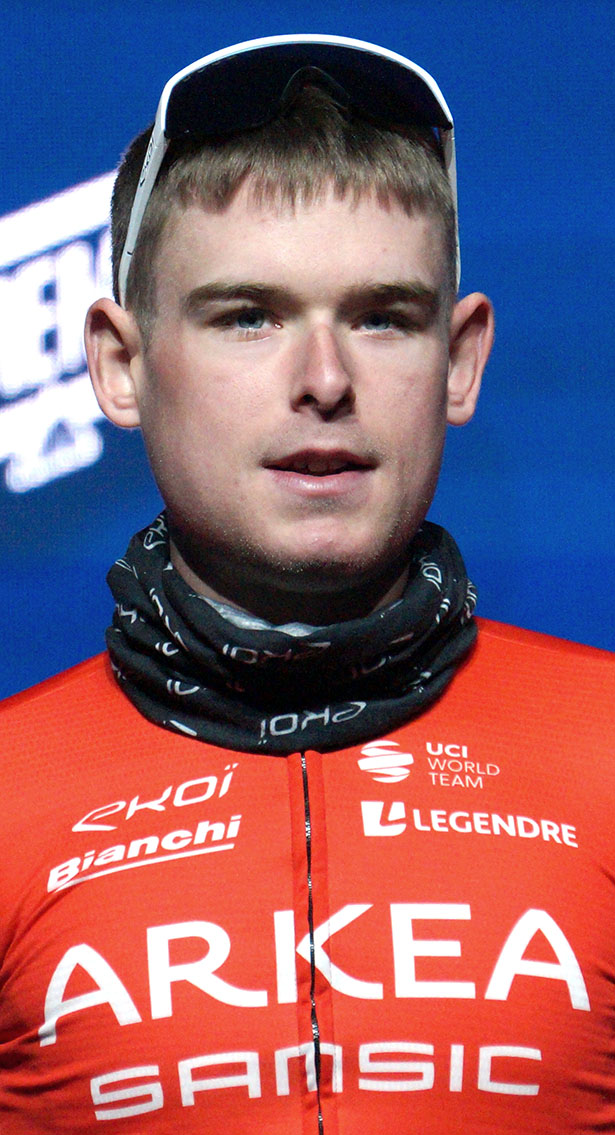
- Le Berre in 2023

Personal information
- Born: 16 April 2001 (age 25) Saint-Brieuc, France
- Height: 1.76 m (5 ft 9 in)
- Weight: 68 kg (150 lb)

Cycling career
- Sport: Cycling
- Current team: Team TotalEnergies
- Discipline: Road
- Role: Rider

Amateur teams
- 2006–2016: Plaintel Vélo Star
- 2016–2020: UC Briochine
- 2021–2022: Côtes d'Armor–Marie Morin

Professional teams
- 2021: Arkéa–Samsic (stagiaire)
- 2023–: Arkéa–Samsic
- 2026–: Team TotalEnergies

Mathis Le Berre (born 16 April 2001) is a French racing cyclist, who currently rides for UCI ProTeam Team TotalEnergies.

He won the 2022 Tour de Normandie.

== Major results ==
2019
4th Road race, National Junior Road Championships
2021
2nd Road race, National Under-23 Road Championships
2022
1st Overall Tour de Normandie

1st Young rider classification
1st Stage 1

1st Stage 4 Boucle de l'Artois
2nd Paris–Tours Espoirs
3rd Overall Tour de Bretagne
5th Road race, Mediterranean Games
9th Overall Tour d'Eure-et-Loir
10th Overall Boucle de l'Artois
2024
8th Polynormande
2025
5th Polynormande
2026
8th Overall Tour du Limousin
9th Overall Tour de Langkawi

=== Grand Tour general classification results timeline ===
Grand Tour	2023
Giro d'Italia	—
Tour de France	—
Vuelta a España	90

Legend
—	Did not compete
DNF	Did not finish
