= Nil Gimeno =

Spanish cyclist

Personal information
- Full name: Nil Gimeno Ferrer
- Born: 21 April 2004 (age 22) Valladolid, Spain
- Height: 1.74 m (5 ft 9 in)

Cycling career
- Sport: Cycling
- Current team: Equipo Kern Pharma
- Discipline: Road
- Role: Rider

Amateur teams
- 2022: MMR Academy
- 2023: Equipo Gomur
- 2024: Equipo Finisher–Kern Pharma

Professional team
- 2025–: Equipo Kern Pharma

Nil Gimeno (born 21 April 2004) is a Spanish cyclist, who currently rides for UCI ProTeam Equipo Kern Pharma.

He won his first professional race at the 2026 Tour de Langkawi, winning from a 4-man breakaway in stage 7 of the race.

He will join Burgos Burpellet BH in 2027.

== Major results ==
2026 (1 pro win)
1st Stage 7 Tour de Langkawi
4th Overall Tour de Taiwan
