= Juan Pedro López =

Spanish cyclist (born 1997)

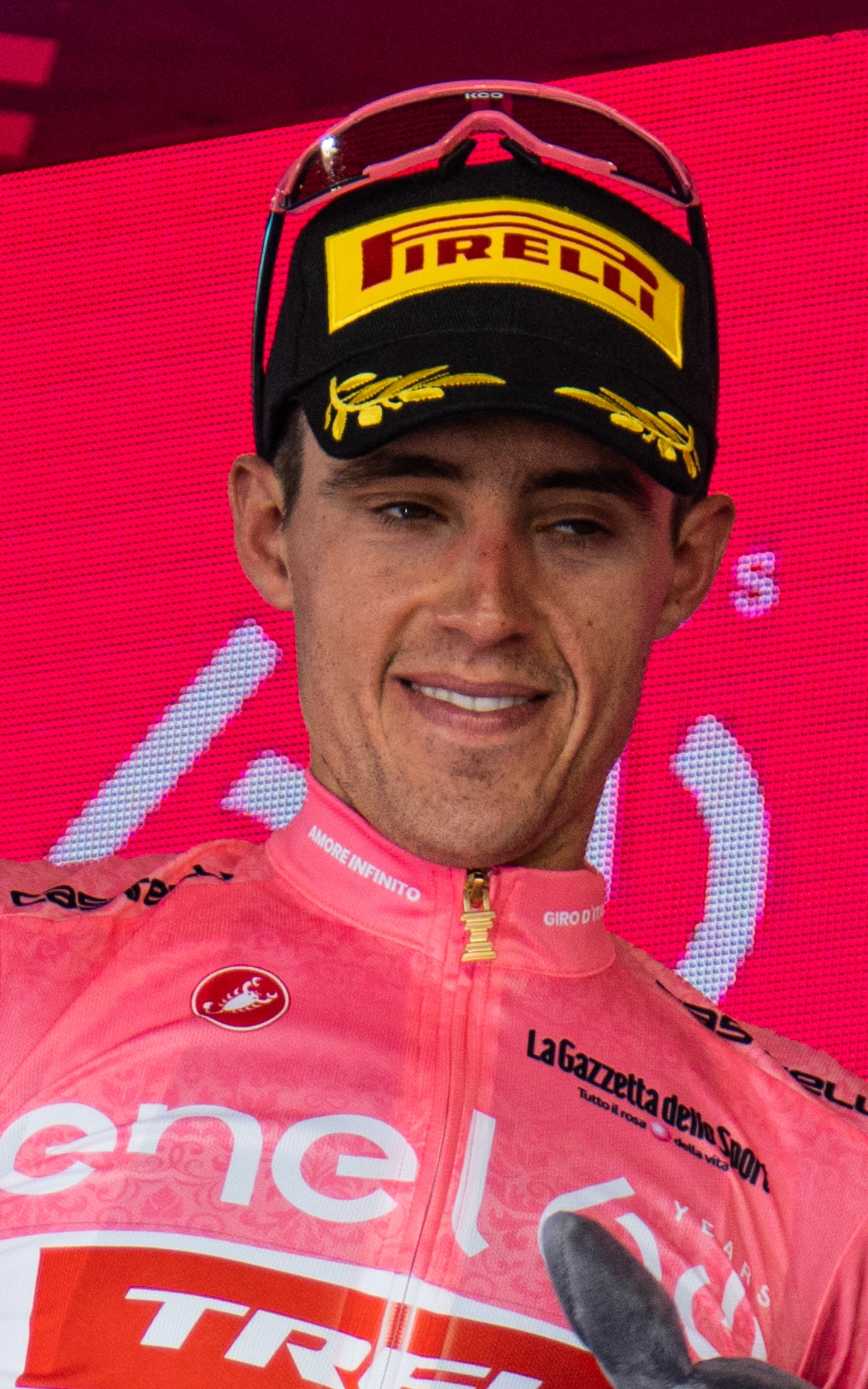
- López at 2022 Giro d'Italia

Personal information
- Full name: Juan Pedro López Pérez
- Nickname: El Patrón
- Born: 31 July 1997 (age 29) Lebrija, Spain
- Height: 1.7 m (5 ft 7 in)
- Weight: 60 kg (132 lb)

Cycling career
- Sport: Cycling
- Current team: Movistar Team
- Discipline: Road
- Role: Rider
- Rider type: Climber

Amateur teams
- 2010–2014: PC Trebujena
- 2015–2018: Specialized–Fundación A. Contador

Professional teams
- 2018–2019: Polartec–Kometa
- 2019: Trek–Segafredo (stagiaire)
- 2020–2023: Trek–Segafredo
- 2024-2025: Lidl–Trek
- 2026-: Movistar Team

Major wins
- Grand Tours Giro d'Italia Young rider classification (2022) Stage races Tour of the Alps (2024)

Juan Pedro López Pérez (born 31 July 1997) is a Spanish cyclist who currently rides for UCI WorldTeam Movistar Team after being transferred from Lidl-Trek in 2026 . Professional since 2018, he is best known for his ride at the 2022 Giro d'Italia, where he held the race lead from stage 4 to 13. He ultimately went on to finish 10th overall and win the young rider classification. He took his first professional win on stage three of the 2024 Tour of the Alps in a solo victory. Alongside the stage win, he also took the overall lead, which he held onto for the remainder of the race.

== Major results ==
2018
1st Overall Vuelta al Bidasoa
7th Overall Giro della Valle d'Aosta
2019
4th Overall Tour of Antalya
6th Overall Tour de Hongrie
9th Overall Giro della Valle d'Aosta

1st Stage 4

2022
10th Overall Giro d'Italia

1st Young rider classification
Held after Stages 4–13

2024 (2 pro wins)
1st Overall Tour of the Alps

1st Stage 3

2025
4th Road race, National Road Championships
7th Overall Tour de Romandie

=== Grand Tour general classification results timeline ===
Grand Tour	2020	2021	2022	2023
Giro d'Italia	—	—	10	—
Tour de France	—	—	—	74
Vuelta a España	42	13	97	17

Legend
—	Did not compete
DNF	Did not finish
