= Giulio Pellizzari =

Italian cyclist

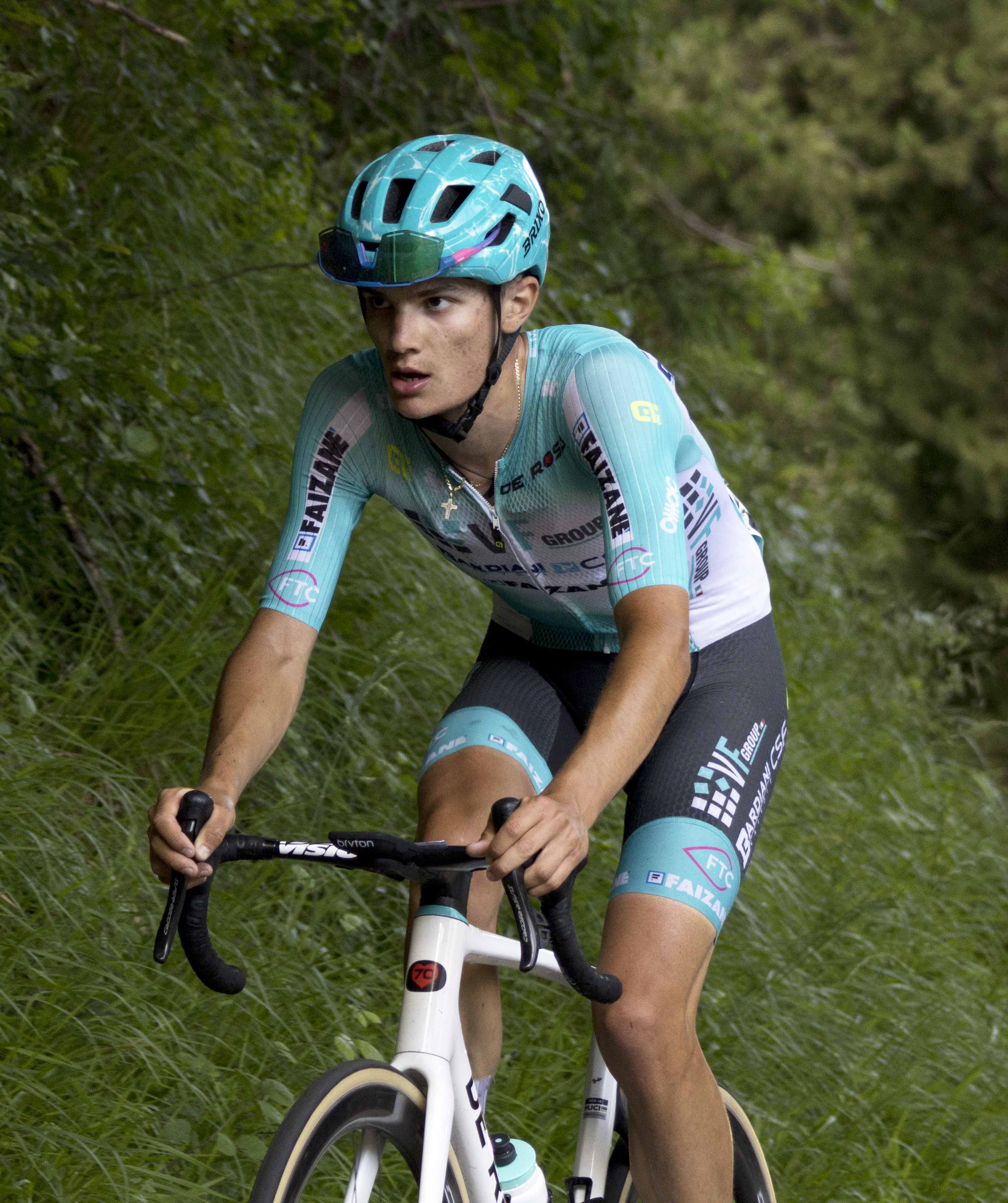
- Pellizzari at the 2024 Giro d'Italia

Personal information
- Born: 21 November 2003 (age 22) San Severino Marche, Italy
- Height: 1.83 m (6 ft 0 in)
- Weight: 66 kg (146 lb)

Cycling career
- Sport: Cycling
- Current team: Red Bull–Bora–Hansgrohe
- Discipline: Road
- Role: Rider
- Rider type: Climber

Amateur team
- 2020–2021: UC Foligno

Professional teams
- 2022–2024: Bardiani–CSF–Faizanè
- 2025–: Red Bull–Bora–Hansgrohe

Major wins
- Grand Tours Vuelta a España 1 individual stage (2025) Stage races Tour of the Alps (2026)

Giulio Pellizzari (born 21 November 2003) is an Italian racing cyclist, who currently rides for UCI WorldTeam Red Bull–Bora–Hansgrohe.

== Career ==
In 2024 he completed his first Grand Tour — the 2024 Giro d'Italia where he finished second on Stage 16.

He signed for UCI WorldTeam Red Bull–Bora–Hansgrohe for the 2025 season. He rode in the 2025 Giro d'Italia where he finished sixth overall. In September 2025, he won Stage 17 of the 2025 Vuelta a España, for his first professional victory.

== Major results ==
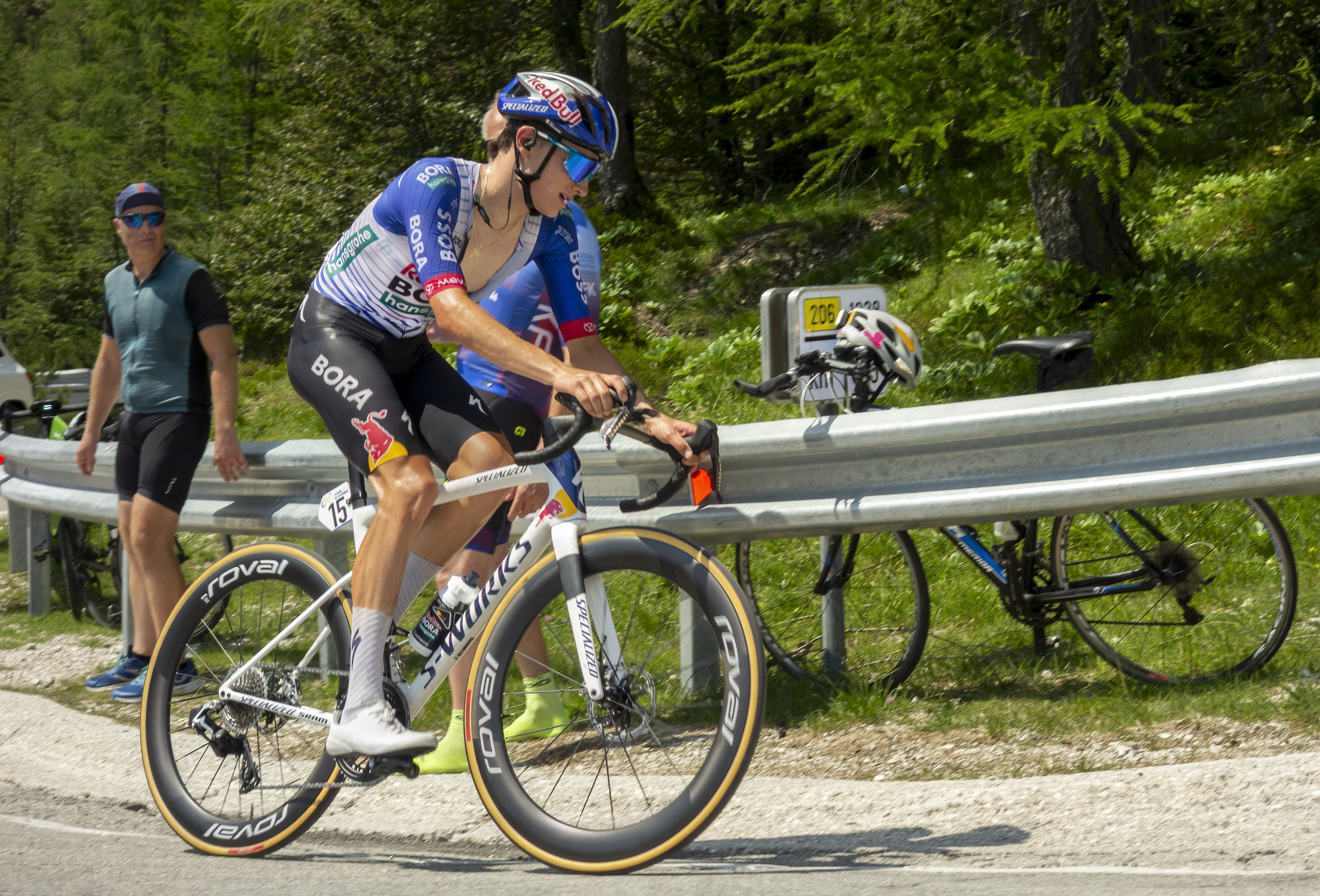
Pellizzari (Red Bull–Bora–Hansgrohe) climbing on Vršič Pass (1611 m) on Stage 4, 2026 Tour of Slovenia where he finished as the second in the General classification, behind the teammate Florian Lipowitz

2021
4th Road race, National Junior Road Championships
5th Trofeo Buffoni
10th Overall Course de la Paix Juniors
10th Trofeo Guido Dorigo
2023
1st Giro del Medio Brenta
2nd Overall Tour de l'Avenir

1st Stage 8

2nd Overall Carpathian Couriers Race

1st Mountains classification
1st Young rider classification

2nd G.P. Palio del Recioto
4th Flèche Ardennaise
6th Overall Tour of Turkey
7th Gran Premio Sportivi di Poggiana
2024
2nd Overall Giro della Regione Friuli Venezia Giulia
3rd Overall Tour of Slovenia

1st Young rider classification

6th Veneto Classic
7th Overall Tour of Austria
7th Overall Istrian Spring Trophy
8th Overall Tour of the Alps
8th Gran Premio Palio del Recioto
Combativity award Stage 20 Giro d'Italia
2025 (1 pro win)
4th Overall Vuelta a Burgos
6th Overall Vuelta a España

1st Stage 17
Held after Stages 6–19

6th Overall Giro d'Italia
2026 (6)
1st Overall Tour of the Alps

1st Young rider classification
1st Stages 2 & 5

1st Giro della Toscana
1st Stage 3 Deutschland Tour
2nd Overall Tour of Slovenia
2nd Memorial Marco Pantani
3rd Overall Tirreno–Adriatico
3rd Overall Volta a la Comunitat Valenciana

1st Young rider classification

4th Overall Vuelta a Burgos

1st Stage 5

4th Milano–Torino
6th Coppa Sabatini

=== General classification results timeline ===
Grand Tour general classification results
Grand Tour	2024	2025	2026
Giro d'Italia	49	6	21
Tour de France	—	—	—
Vuelta a España	—	6	
Major stage race general classification results
Race	2024	2025	2026
Paris–Nice	—	—	—
Tirreno–Adriatico	—	—	3
Volta a Catalunya	—	16	—
Tour of the Basque Country	—	—	—
Tour de Romandie	—	—	—
Critérium du Dauphiné	—	—	—
Tour de Suisse	—	—	—

Legend
—	Did not compete
DNF	Did not finish
