= Cedrik Bakke Christophersen =

Norwegian road cyclist

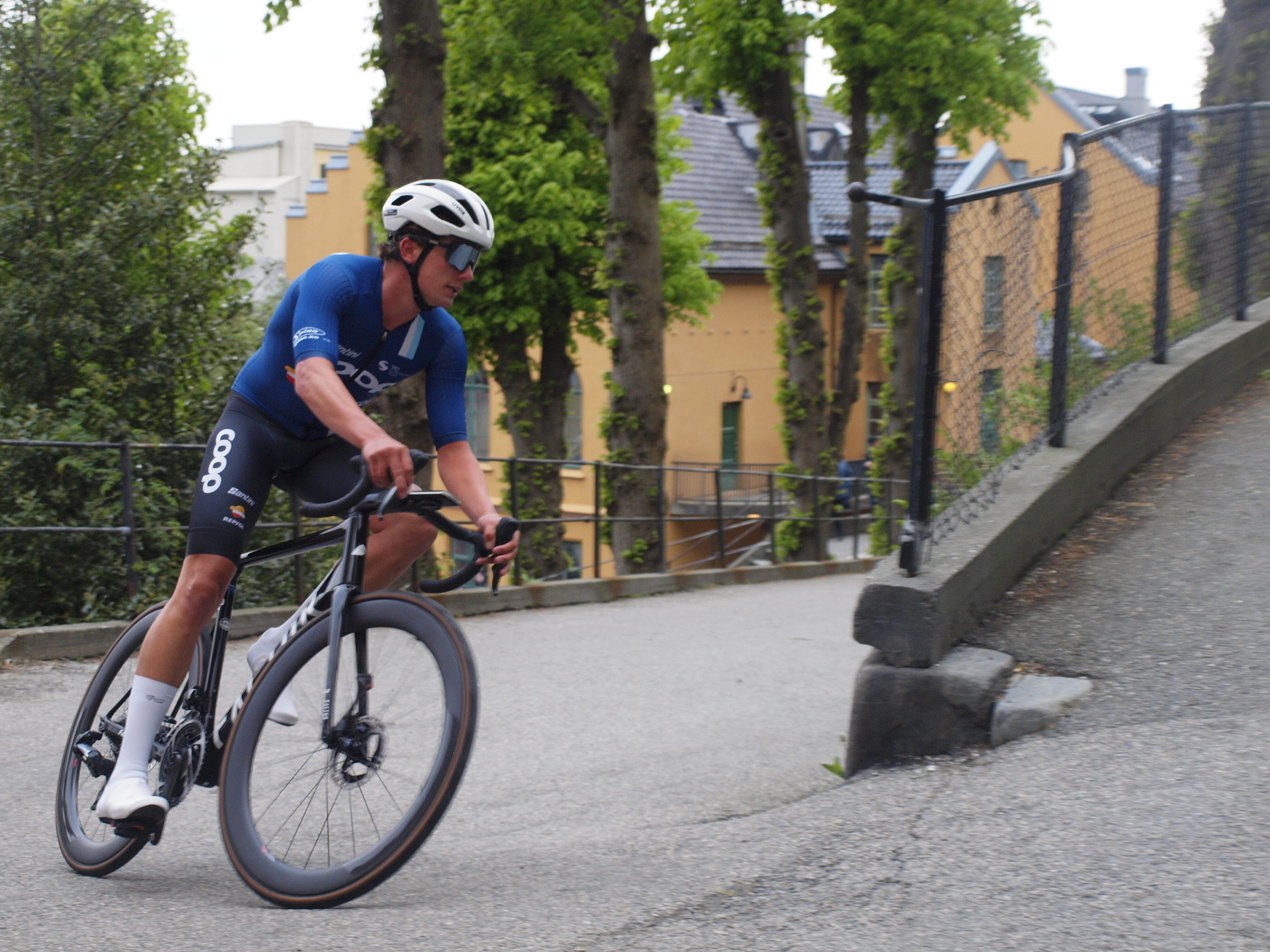
- Christophersen at the 2023 Tour of Norway

Personal information
- Full name: Cedrik Bakke Christophersen
- Born: 11 December 2001 (age 24) Tønsberg, Norway

Cycling career
- Sport: Cycling
- Current team: Unibet Rose Rockets
- Discipline: Road
- Role: Rider

Amateur team
- 2021–2022: Tønsberg CK

Professional teams
- 2023: Team Coop–Repsol
- 2024–: TDT–Unibet Cycling Team

Cedrik Bakke Christophersen (born 11 December 2001) is a Norwegian cyclist, who currently rides for UCI ProTeam Unibet Rose Rockets.

== Major results ==
2022
7th Overall Tour te Fjells
2023
2nd Overall Visit South Aegean Islands

1st Young riders classification
1st Stage 2

4th Overall Course de la Paix U23
4th Lillehammer GP
7th Overall Tour of Qinghai Lake
7th Gylne Gutuer
8th Okolo jižních Čech
8th Sundvolden GP
10th Overall Arctic Race of Norway
2025
5th Overall Tour de Langkawi
2026 (1 pro win)
8th Overall Arctic Race of Norway

1st Stage 4

10th Overall Tour de Langkawi
