= Lennart Jasch =

German cyclist

- Jasch in 2026

Personal information
- Born: 14 November 2000 (age 25) Prien am Chiemsee, Germany

Cycling career
- Sport: Cycling
- Current team: Tudor Pro Cycling Team
- Discipline: Road
- Role: Rider
- Rider type: Climber

Amateur team
- 2024: MaxSolar Cycling Team

Professional teams
- 2025: Red Bull–Bora–Hansgrohe Rookies
- 2026: Tudor Pro Cycling Team U23
- 2026–: Tudor Pro Cycling Team

Major wins
- Stage races Tour de Langkawi (2026)

Lennart Jasch (born 14 November 2000) is a German cyclist, who currently rides for UCI ProTeam Tudor Pro Cycling Team.

From 2011 to 2024, Jasch competed in speed skating at a high level, even being selected for the national team. He used cycling only for training purposes. However, a muscle imbalance prevented him from competing in skating in 2023. He then came into contact with coach Dan Lorang, who worked with Bora–Hansgrohe, who encouraged him to begin competing. Jasch participated in his first official cycling events in 2024. A good climber, he quickly achieved several top finishes. He notably finished tenth in the Oberösterreich Rundfahrt that season.

In 2025, he joined Red Bull–Bora–Hansgrohe Rookies, the continental reserve team of Red Bull–Bora–Hansgrohe. During that season, he won the final stage and the overall classification of the Giro della Regione Friuli Venezia Giulia. He also finished second in the Trofeo Alcide Degasperi and ninth in the Czech Tour among other top 10 placings.

Jasch joined Tudor Pro Cycling Team U23 in 2026, taking his first professional win on stage four of the Tour of the Alps via a breakaway.

== Major results ==
2024
10th Overall Oberösterreich Rundfahrt
2025
1st Overall Giro della Regione Friuli Venezia Giulia

1st Stage 4

2nd Trofeo Alcide Degasperi
8th Overall Tour Alsace
9th Overall Czech Tour
2026 (4 pro wins)
1st Overall Tour de Langkawi

1st Mountains classification
1st Stage 2

Tour of the Alps

1st Mountains classification
1st Stage 4

4th À travers les Hautes Fagnes
5th Overall Giro d'Abruzzo

1st Stage 2

8th Flèche Ardennaise
