= Luca Paletti =

Italian cyclist

- Paletti in 2026

Personal information
- Born: 5 June 2004 (age 22) Lecco, Italy

Cycling career
- Sport: Cycling
- Current team: Bardiani–CSF 7 Saber
- Disciplines: Road; Cyclo-cross
- Role: Rider
- Rider type: Climber

Amateur team
- 2021–2022: Team Ciclistico Paletti

Professional team
- 2023–: Green Project–Bardiani–CSF–Faizanè

Luca Paletti (born 5 June 2004) is an Italian racing cyclist, who currently rides for UCI ProTeam Bardiani–CSF 7 Saber.

== Major results ==
=== Road ===
2022
5th Road race, National Junior Championships
5th Overall Saarland Trofeo
2024
9th Overall Alpes Isère Tour
10th Gran Premio Industrie del Marmo
2025
9th Giro dell'Appennino
9th Trofeo Piva
2026
7th Giro dell'Appennino

==== Grand Tour general classification results timeline ====
Grand Tour	2026
Giro d'Italia	101
Tour de France	—
Vuelta a España	—

Legend
—	Did not compete
DNF	Did not finish

=== Cyclo-cross ===
2020–2021
2nd National Junior Championships
2021–2022
1st Ciclocross del Ponte Juniors
1st Jesolo Juniors
1st Illnau Juniors
1st Cremona Juniors
3rd UEC European Junior Championships
UCI Junior World Cup

3rd Flamanville

3rd San Colombano Juniors
2024–2025
UEC Under-23 European Cup

1st Lombardy
