= Jorge Gutiérrez (cyclist) =

Spanish cyclist (born 2002)

Personal information
- Full name: Jorge Gutiérrez González
- Born: 23 September 2002 (age 24) Trujillo, Cáceres, Spain
- Height: 1.76 m (5 ft 9 in)
- Weight: 58 kg (128 lb)

Cycling career
- Sport: Cycling
- Current team: Equipo Kern Pharma
- Disciplines: Road; Track
- Role: Rider
- Rider type: Climber

Amateur teams
- 2019: OID–Ciclos Ebora
- 2020: Cycling Team Junior Ciudad de Talavera
- 2021–2023: Lizarte

Professional team
- 2024–: Equipo Kern Pharma

Jorge Gutiérrez González (born 23 September 2002) is a Spanish cyclist, who currently rides for UCI ProTeam Equipo Kern Pharma.

== Major results ==
2020
9th Gipuzkoa Klasika
2023
3rd Memorial Valenciaga
4th Road race, National Under-23 Championships
2024
4th Clásica Terres de l'Ebre
6th Overall Alpes Isère Tour
8th Overall GP Beiras e Serra da Estrela

1st Young rider classification

10th Overall Tour de Langkawi
2026
6th Overall Tour de Langkawi
10th Giro della Toscana

=== Grand Tour general classification results timeline ===
Grand Tour	2024
Giro d'Italia	—
Tour de France	—
Vuelta a España	99

Legend
—	Did not compete
DNF	Did not finish
