= Jan Castellon =

Spanish cyclist

Personal information
- Full name: Jan Castellon Ribalta
- Born: 31 July 2003 (age 23) Tolosa, Spain
- Height: 1.70 m (5 ft 7 in)
- Weight: 55 kg (121 lb)

Cycling career
- Sport: Cycling
- Current team: Caja Rural–Seguros RGA
- Discipline: Road
- Role: Rider
- Rider type: Climber

Amateur teams
- 2021: UCV Bikesports
- 2022–2024: Caja Rural–Alea

Professional team
- 2025–: Caja Rural–Seguros RGA

Jan Castellon Ribalta (born 31 July 2003) is a Spanish cyclist, who currently rides for UCI ProTeam Caja Rural–Seguros RGA.

== Major results ==
2023
1st Stage 3 Vuelta a Zamora
2024
1st Arratera Igoera
2nd Overall Vuelta al Bidasoa

1st Stage 3

2nd Santikutz Klasika
2nd Memorial Valenciaga
2nd Oñati Proba
2025
4th Overall Route d'Occitanie
5th Time trial, National Road Championships
5th Overall Tour de Hongrie
5th Overall Tour of Slovenia
10th Overall Vuelta a Asturias
2026
3rd Overall Tour de Langkawi
7th Giro della Toscana
9th Overall AlUla Tour
