= Abel Balderstone =

Spanish cyclist (born 2000)

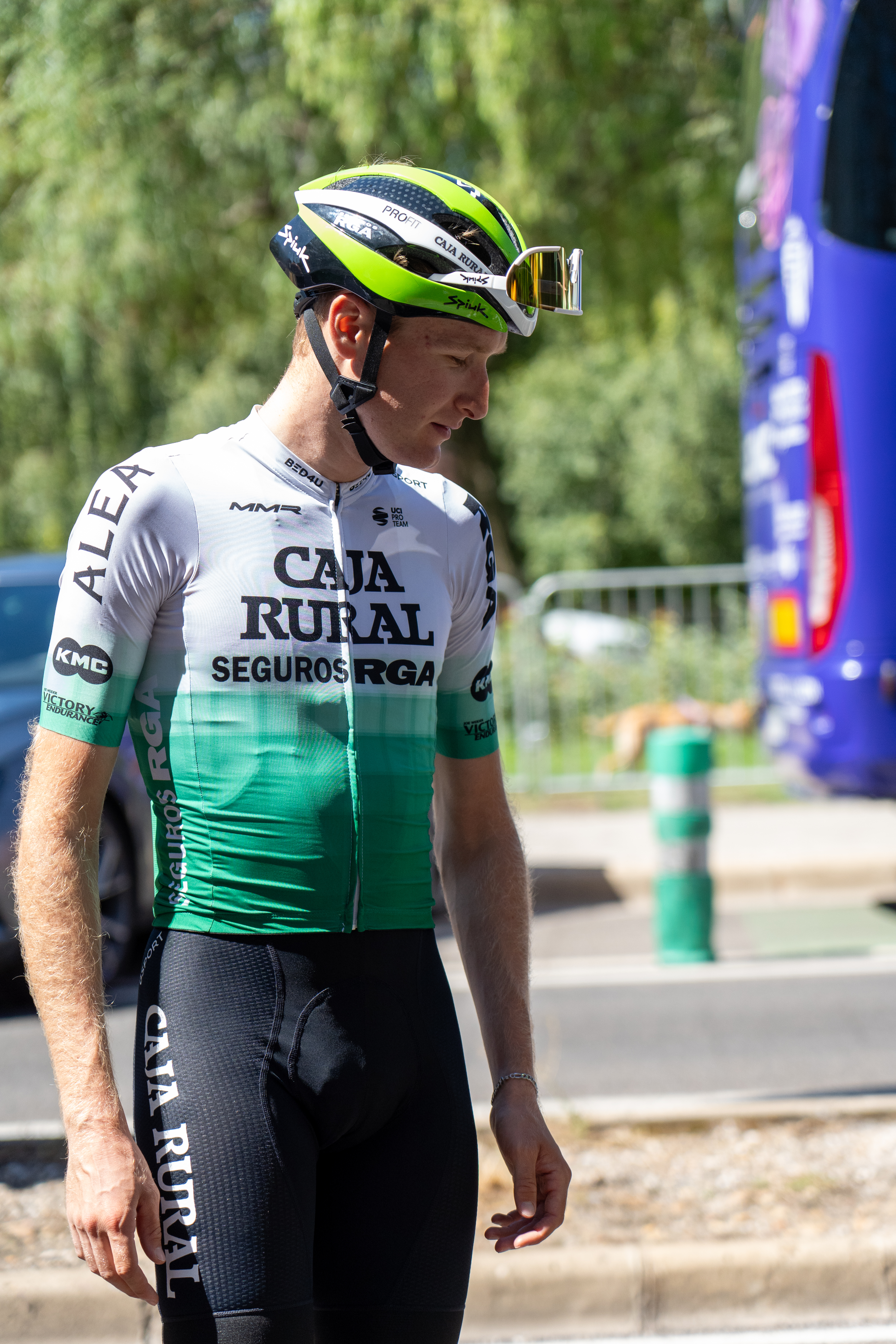
- Balderstone at the 2023 Vuelta a España

Personal information
- Full name: Abel Balderstone Roumens
- Born: 7 July 2000 (age 26) Ullastrell, Spain
- Height: 1.79 m (5 ft 10 in)
- Weight: 61 kg (134 lb)

Cycling career
- Sport: Cycling
- Current team: Caja Rural–Seguros RGA
- Discipline: Road
- Role: Rider
- Rider type: Time trialist, Climber

Amateur teams
- 2017–2018: Tot-Net Terrassa
- 2019–2021: Valverde Team–Tierra Fecundis
- 2022: Caja Rural–Alea

Professional teams
- 2022: Caja Rural–Seguros RGA (stagiaire)
- 2023–: Caja Rural–Seguros RGA

Major wins
- One-day races and Classics National Time Trial Championships (2025)

Abel Balderstone Roumens (born 7 July 2000) is a Spanish cyclist, who currently rides for UCI ProTeam Caja Rural–Seguros RGA. His father was an English teacher who moved to Spain for work.

== Major results ==
2022
3rd Road race, National Under-23 Road Championships
8th Overall Okolo Slovenska
2023
2nd Overall GP Beiras e Serra da Estrela

1st Stage 4

10th Overall Tour de Hongrie
2024
1st Clásica Terres de l'Ebre
2025 (1 pro win)
1st Time trial, National Road Championships
4th Overall Tour of Turkey
2026
2nd Overall Tour de Langkawi
4th Overall O Gran Camiño

=== Grand Tour general classification results timeline ===
Grand Tour	2023	2024	2025	2026
Giro d'Italia	—	—	—	—
Tour de France	—	—	—	IP
Vuelta a España	77	—	13	—

Legend
—	Did not compete
DNF	Did not finish
