= Riley Pickrell =

Canadian cyclist

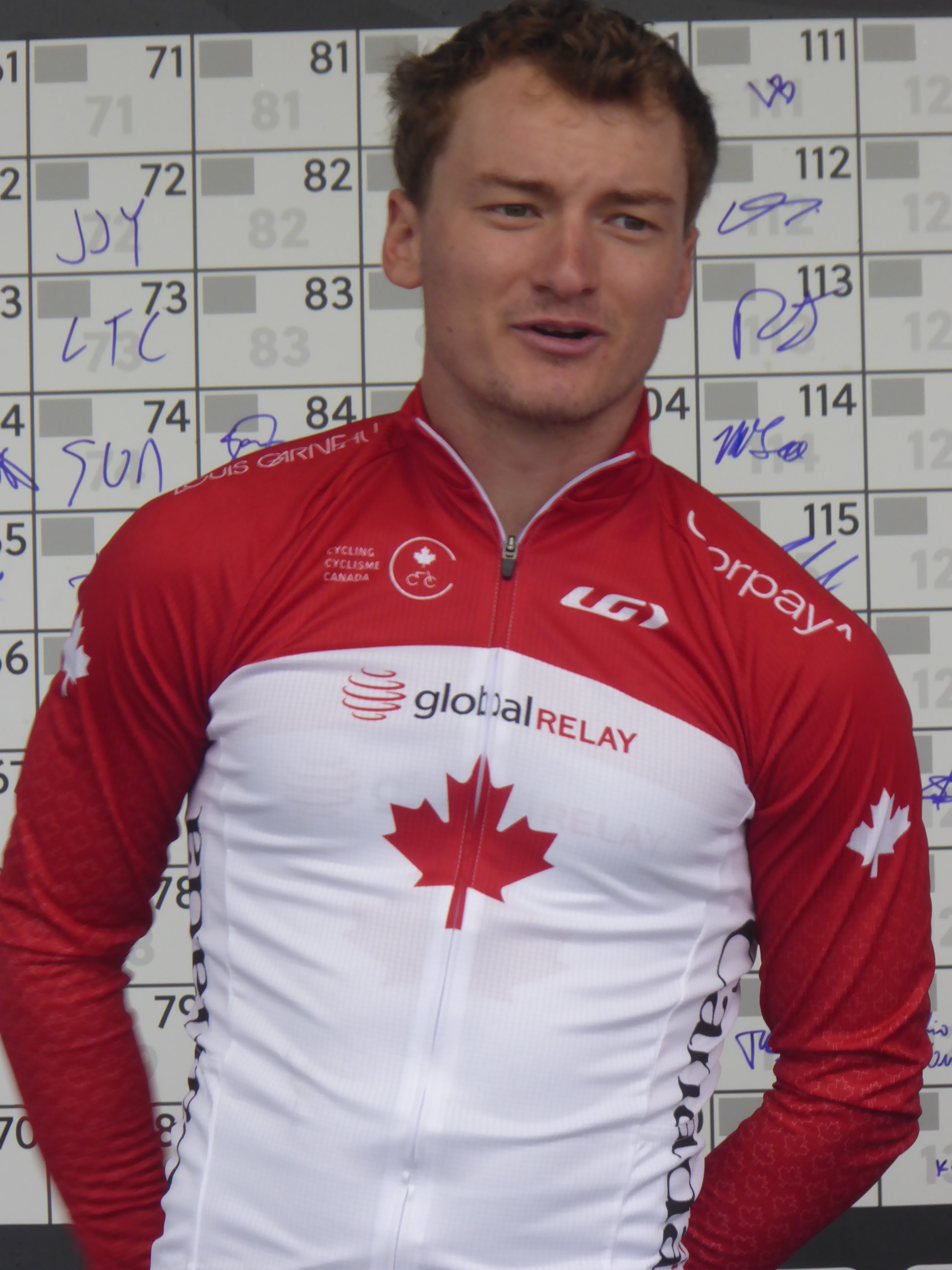
- Pickrell in 2023

Personal information
- Born: 16 August 2001 (age 25) Victoria, British Columbia
- Height: 1.69 m (5 ft 7 in)
- Weight: 72 kg (159 lb)

Cycling career
- Sport: Cycling
- Current team: Modern Adventure Pro Cycling
- Disciplines: Road; Track
- Role: Rider
- Rider type: Classics specialist

Amateur teams
- 2019: Trek Red Truck Racing p/b Mosaic
- 2020: World Cycling Centre

Professional teams
- 2021–2023: Israel Cycling Academy
- 2024–2025: Israel–Premier Tech
- 2026–: Modern Adventure Pro Cycling

Riley Pickrell (born 16 August 2001) is a Canadian cyclist, who currently rides for UCI ProTeam Modern Adventure Pro Cycling.

== Major results ==
2018
Tour de l'Abitibi

1st Points classification
1st Stages 1, 4 & 6

2019
1st Stage 3b Tour de l'Abitibi
2022
1st Stage 4 Giro d'Italia Giovani Under 23
2023
1st Gastown Grand Prix
1st Stage 2 Tour de l'Avenir
8th Road race, Pan American Games
2024 (2 pro wins)
1st Stage 2a Sibiu Cycling Tour
1st Stage 6 Tour de Langkawi

=== Grand Tour general classification results timeline ===
Grand Tour	2024
Giro d'Italia	DNF
Tour de France	—
Vuelta a España	—

Legend
—	Did not compete
DNF	Did not finish
