= Ronan Augé =

French cyclist

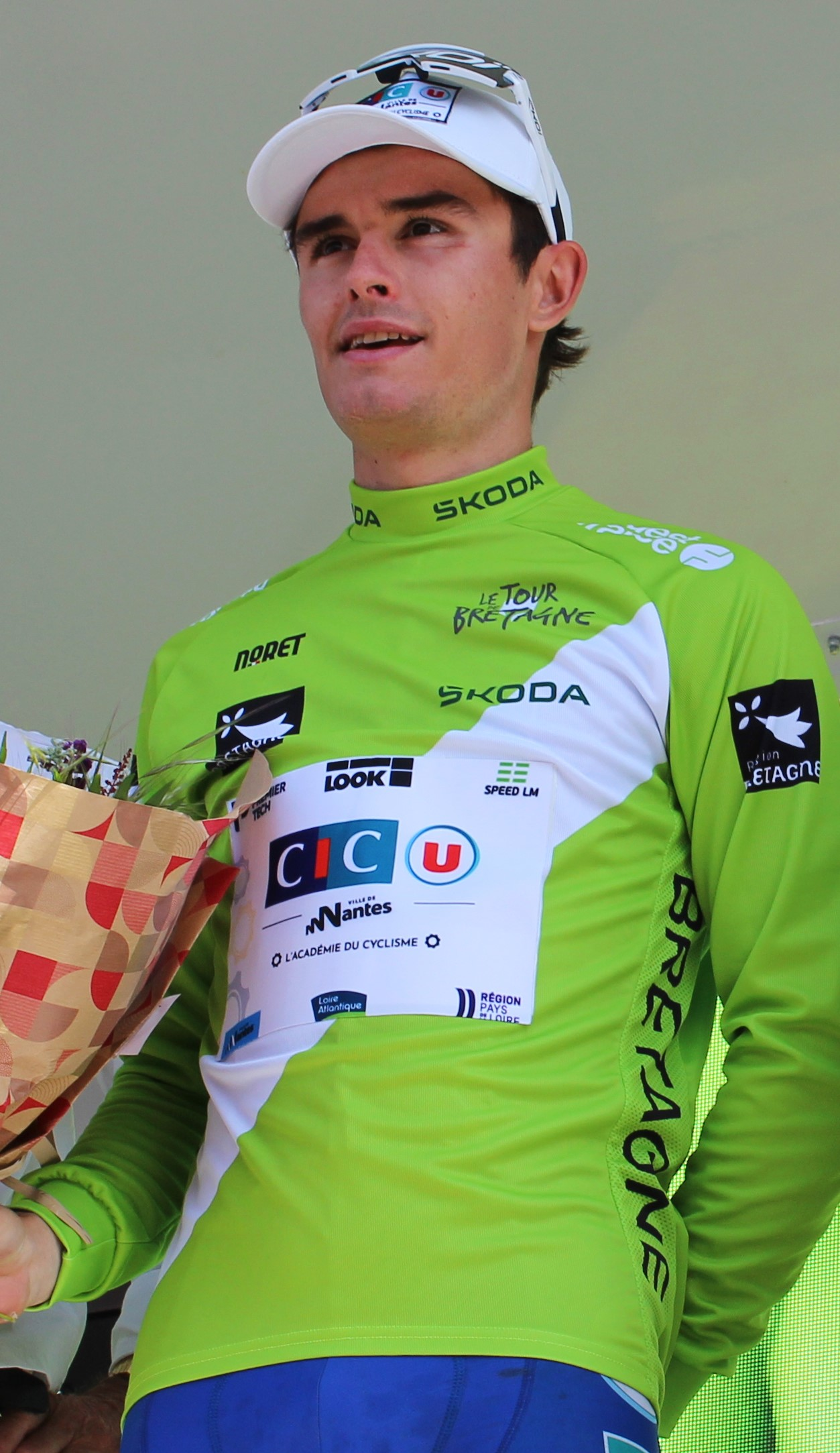
- Augé in 2025

Personal information
- Born: 29 April 2004 (age 22) Pau, Pyrénées-Atlantiques, France
- Height: 1.74 m (5 ft 9 in)
- Weight: 61 kg (134 lb)

Cycling career
- Sport: Cycling
- Current team: Unibet Rose Rockets
- Discipline: Road
- Role: Rider

Amateur team
- 2021–2022: Team UC Nantes–Atlantique U19

Professional teams
- 2023–2024: Équipe Continentale Groupama–FDJ
- 2025: CIC–U–Nantes
- 2026–: Unibet Rose Rockets

Ronan Augé (born 29 April 2004) is a French road cyclist, who rides for UCI ProTeam Unibet Rose Rockets.

== Major results ==
2022
1st Stage 2b Trophée Centre Morbihan
2nd La Bernaudeau Junior
2023
7th Grand Prix de la ville de Pérenchies
2024
3rd Grand Prix de la ville de Nogent-sur-Oise
2025
3rd Grand Prix de Plouay
5th Paris–Troyes
2026 (1 pro win)
1st Stage 2 Route d'Occitanie
5th Heistse Pijl
