= Mattia Gaffuri =

Italian bicycle racer (born 1999)

Personal information
- Born: 4 July 1999 (age 27) Erba, Lombardy, Italy
- Height: 1.84 m (6 ft 0 in)
- Weight: 67 kg (148 lb)

Cycling career
- Sport: Cycling
- Current team: Team Picnic–PostNL
- Disciplines: Road; Gravel
- Role: Rider
- Rider type: Climber

Amateur teams
- 2019–2021: Velo Club Mendrisio
- 2024–2025: Swatt Club

Professional teams
- 2025: Team Polti VisitMalta (stagiaire)
- 2026–: Team Picnic–PostNL

Mattia Gaffuri (born 4 July 1999) is an Italian cyclist, who currently rides for UCI WorldTeam Team Picnic–PostNL.

== Career ==
Gaffuri was born on 4 July 1999, in Erba, Lombardy. During his youth, he competed in running. He decided to switch to cycling at twenty years old, after suffering several injuries. Competing for Swiss club VC Mendrisio, he participated in various races between September 2019 and August 2021. However, he was not recruited by a professional team. Gaffuri then chose to prioritize his studies, with the goal of becoming a coach. He nevertheless continued to cycle at an amateur level. At the same time, he started a coaching company with fellow cyclist Luca Vergallito.

In summer 2023, Gaffuri entered the inaugural European Climbers' Championship, finishing second, behind professional Felix Großschartner. A few months later, he finished second in the 2024 Zwift Academy program before signing a gravel cycling partnership with Colnago. He also won the UCI Gran Fondo World Championships in the 19-34 age category that fall.

In 2025, Gaffuri finished third in an international gravel race in Monaco, behind Mads Würtz Schmidt and Lukas Pöstlberger. He also participated in several road races. Riding for Swatt Club, he finished second in the Tour de Beauce and third in the Oberösterreich Rundfahrt and fifth in the Italian National Road Race Championships, won by teammate Filippo Conca. In August, he joined UCI ProTeam Team Polti VisitMalta as a stagiaire, before signing full time with UCI WorldTeam Team Picnic–PostNL in 2026.

== Major results ==
=== Gravel ===
2025
1st National Championships
UCI World Series

3rd Monaco

5th European Championships

=== Road ===
2023
2nd Championnats d'Europe des Grimpeurs
2024
1st UCI Gran Fondo World Championships (19-34)
2025
1st Pessano–Roncola
2nd Overall Tour de Beauce

1st Mountains classification

3rd Overall Oberösterreich Rundfahrt
5th Road race, National Championships
6th Sundvolden GP
8th Ringerike GP
10th Overall Giro della Regione Friuli Venezia Giulia
