= Caja Rural–Seguros RGA =

Spanish road cycling team

Team information
- UCI code: CJR
- Registered: Spain
- Founded: 2010
- Discipline: Road
- Status: UCI ProTeam
- Bicycles: ViVELO (2012–2014); Fuji (2015–2017); De Rosa (2018–2020) Guerciotti (2021–2022); MMR (2022–)
- Website: Team home page

Key personnel
- General manager: José Manuel Hernández
- Team manager: Eugenio Goikoetxea

Team name history
- 2010–Feb 2013 Feb 2013–: Caja Rural; Caja Rural–Seguros RGA
Caja Rural–Seguros RGA jersey
Jersey

Caja Rural–Seguros RGA (UCI team code: CJR) is a UCI ProTeam cycling team sponsored principally by Grupo Caja Rural, a Spanish banking group. The team participates in UCI Europe Tour races and UCI World Tour events when given a wildcard invitation. The team's administrative offices and management are based in Pamplona, Navarra, Spain, but its service course (workshop and warehouse facility) is in Alsasua, Navarra. It was announced in February 2013 that the team had acquired a co-sponsor in a subsidiary of Caja Rural and would become known as Caja Rural–Seguros RGA from 21 February 2013.

== History ==
Caja Rural re-entered professional cycling in the 2010 season. In late 2009, Caja Rural decided to move back to the professional peloton, forming a UCI Continental Team (competing in the Europe UCI Continental Circuits) that among other things would give continuity to their under 23 and elite amateur teams. In 2010, its first year returning as a professional team, the team's total budget was €837,932. The original squad was made up of 16 riders, of whom 5 had come up from the amateur team. During the season, 4 members of the amateur team turned professional, 3 of them joining Caja Rural and one moving to Movistar.

On October 19, 2010, Juanikorena Iñaki signed a contract with Preventia Sports Club (Club Deportivo Preventia), who manage the Caja Rural professional team, to continue as the team's Directeur Sportif in 2011. However, on 14 December 2010, he announced his departure due to major professional differences over approaches to training ("importantes diferencias en los criterios técnicos-deportivos"). Iñaki was replaced by Mikel Azparren. At the end of January 2011, Iñaki brought a lawsuit against the team in the Civil Court (Juzgado de los Social) of Pamplona, Navarra, Spain. Iñaki proved breach of contract in his suit. The team's appeal to the Superior Court (Tribunal Superior de Justicia de Navarra) was dismissed on July 25, 2012, and the UCI made full payment of his salary for 2011, drawing from the team's bank guaranty held by the UCI.

In 2011, Caja Rural advanced to the UCI Professional Continental category with a view to competing in top level racing, especially the 2011 Vuelta a España, the first Vuelta in 33 years to visit the Basque Country. On its début as a UCI Professional Continental team, Caja Rural adopted the motto: "un equipo para creer, un equipo para crecer" ("a team to believe in, a team for growth"). The team emphasizes that "growth" in the latter part of this motto is meant to connote not only the growth of the squad, but also the growth of athletes as individuals, in particular amateur athletes making the leap to the professional ranks. In August 2011, Caja Rural rider Fabricio Ferrari won the overall Mountains Classification in the Volta a Portugal and the Young Rider Classification went to Garikoitz "Gari" Bravo. The team did not compete in the 2011 Vuelta a España, but was named the Best Navarro Sports Team in 2011 by the Government of Navarra.

Caja Rural was invited to participate in the 2012 Vuelta a España, which departed from Pamplona where the team is based. The 2012 Vuelta saw Caja Rural rider Antonio Piedra, take Stage 15, a high mountain affair finishing atop the Lakes of Covadonga climb. Piedra dropped his breakaway companions on the first "Hors Category" climb of the Vuelta, and finished with 2 minutes and 2 seconds advantage over his nearest competitor. The team's enthusiasm for competition in their Vuelta début was highlighted by a heartbreaking episode in the 4th stage. Marcos García valiantly fought to the head of the peloton, sprinted to the finish line and threw kisses to the crowd as he crossed it triumphantly. However, owing to miscommunication with the team car, he was unaware that three escapees had crossed the line before him.

David Arroyo of the Movistar Team who placed second in the 2010 Giro d'Italia and Amets Txurruka who rode for Euskaltel–Euskadi and took first in the Young Riders Classification at the 2007 Tour de France joined Caja Rural in the 2013 season. These two experienced riders have participated in 25 Grand Tours. After a change of management in the 2012 season and in an effort to retain its UCI World Tour license, Euskaltel–Euskadi began including more riders from outside the Basque Country who hold high UCI World Tour rankings. Caja Rural has been a beneficiary of this policy picking up Txurruka and Iván Velasco from Euskaltel–Euskadi, but the team also lost the promising young cyclist Garikoitz Bravo to Euskaltel–Euskadi at the same time.

On 21 February 2013, the team's name changed to "Caja Rural-Seguros RGA". Two days later Antonio Piedra took the first podium for the newly renamed team by winning the Mountains Classification in the Vuelta a Murcia, part of the UCI Europe Tour. The first General Classification victory for the newly badged team was won by Francesco Lasca on 31 March 2013 in the Vuelta a La Rioja. Caja Rural–Seguros RGA rider Javier Aramendia won the Overall Combativity Award at the 2013 Vuelta a España after he and his teammates Antonio Piedra, David Arroyo and Fabricio Ferrari took 7 of the 20 stage Combativity Awards given during the race.

== Sponsorship ==
The professional team's principal sponsor is Grupo Caja Rural, a savings bank and agricultural credit cooperative in Spain with 3,600 branches.

On 21 February 2013, Caja Rural added a new co-sponsor Seguros RGA. Seguros RGA (meaning "Insurance RGA") was founded on 17 March 1986 as the insurance subsidiary of Grupo Caja Rural. The "Seguros RGA" name and logo were added to new team jerseys and all other media. Seguros RGA had supported the team in its bid to compete in the 2012 Vuelta a España and was featured on Vuelta team jerseys. Seguros RGA was so impressed with the profile and performance of the team that they decided to step forward as a team co-sponsor.

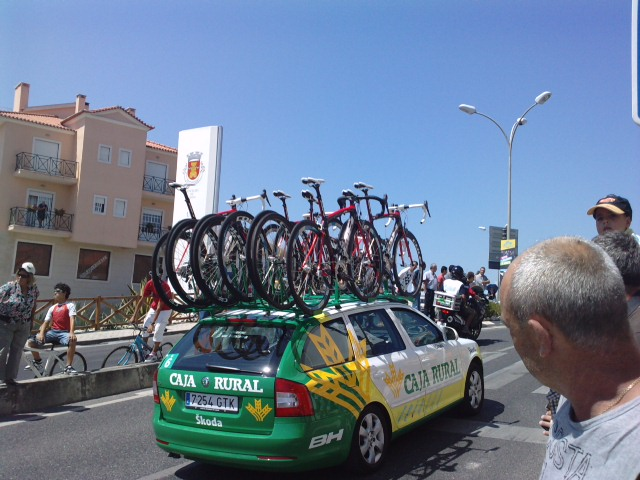
Team Car at the 2010 Volta a Portugal

Škoda Auto provides sponsorship and team cars. Euskorot, a Basque Country graphics company, supplies the team car livery.

Team bikes for the 2015 and 2016 seasons are supplied by Fuji Bikes models Transonic, Altamira and Norcom Straight. From the 2012 to the 2014 season, the team had ridden Bulgarian brand bicycles ViVELO.

From the 2015 season, team kit is supplied by Italian clothing brand ALÉ, replacing Inverse–CIRO SPORT from the previous several seasons. Spiuk supplies the team's helmets and glasses.

From the 2016 season, the power meters and computers are supplied by Pioneer replacing Rotor

Bed4u Hotels added its sponsorship in January 2013 offering the team lodging. Bed4u replaced Playitas, a Canary Islands sports resort where the team trained in the winter of 2012, on team jerseys.

Centro Médico Vitasport (Vitasport Medical Centre), an advanced technology athletic training centre for professional and amateur athletes is a sponsor and also the registered office of Club Deportivo Preventia, the organization that runs the team.

== Team roster ==
As of 13 August 2026.

Rider	Date of birth
Julen Arriola-Bengoa (ESP)	16 February 2001 (age 25)
Abel Balderstone (ESP)	7 July 2000 (age 26)
Fernando Barceló (ESP)	6 January 1996 (age 30)
Sebastian Berwick (AUS)	15 December 1999 (age 26)
Joan Bou (ESP)	16 January 1997 (age 29)
Jan Castellon (ESP)	31 July 2003 (age 23)
Gorka Corres (ESP)	5 June 2005 (age 21)
Sergi Darder (ESP)	30 June 2003 (age 23)
Álex Díaz (ESP)	28 July 2001 (age 25)
Samuel Fernández (ESP)	11 July 2003 (age 23)
Fernando Gaviria (COL)	19 August 1994 (age 32)
Jaume Guardeño (ESP)	20 February 2003 (age 23)
Javier Ibañez (ESP)	29 November 2001 (age 24)

Rider	Date of birth
Ellane Larronde (FRA)	7 November 2006 (age 19)
Iúri Leitão (POR)	3 July 1998 (age 28)
Joseba López (ESP)	5 March 2000 (age 26)
Pablo Lospitao (ESP)	19 July 2005 (age 21)
Alex Molenaar (NED)	13 July 1999 (age 27)
Joel Nicolau (ESP)	23 December 1997 (age 28)
Stefano Oldani (ITA)	10 January 1998 (age 28)
Jakub Otruba (CZE)	30 January 1998 (age 28)
José Félix Parra (ESP)	16 January 1997 (age 29)
Francisco Joel Peñuela (VEN)	1 February 2001 (age 25)
Eduard Prades (ESP)	9 August 1987 (age 39)
Gorka Sorarrain (ESP)	21 May 1996 (age 30)
Iker Villar (ESP)	24 November 2006 (age 19)

== National champions ==
2012
Bulgarian Road Race, Danail Petrov
Portuguese Road Race Championships, Manuel Antonio Cardoso
2013
Bulgarian Road Race, Danail Petrov
2019
European Track (Scratch race), Sebastian Mora
2022
Venezuelan Time Trial, Orluis Aular
Venezuelan Road Race, Orluis Aular
2023
Venezuelan Time Trial, Orluis Aular
Venezuelan Road Race, Orluis Aular
2025
Uruguaian Road Race, Guillermo Thomas Silva
