= Alessandro Covi =

Italian cyclist (born 1998)

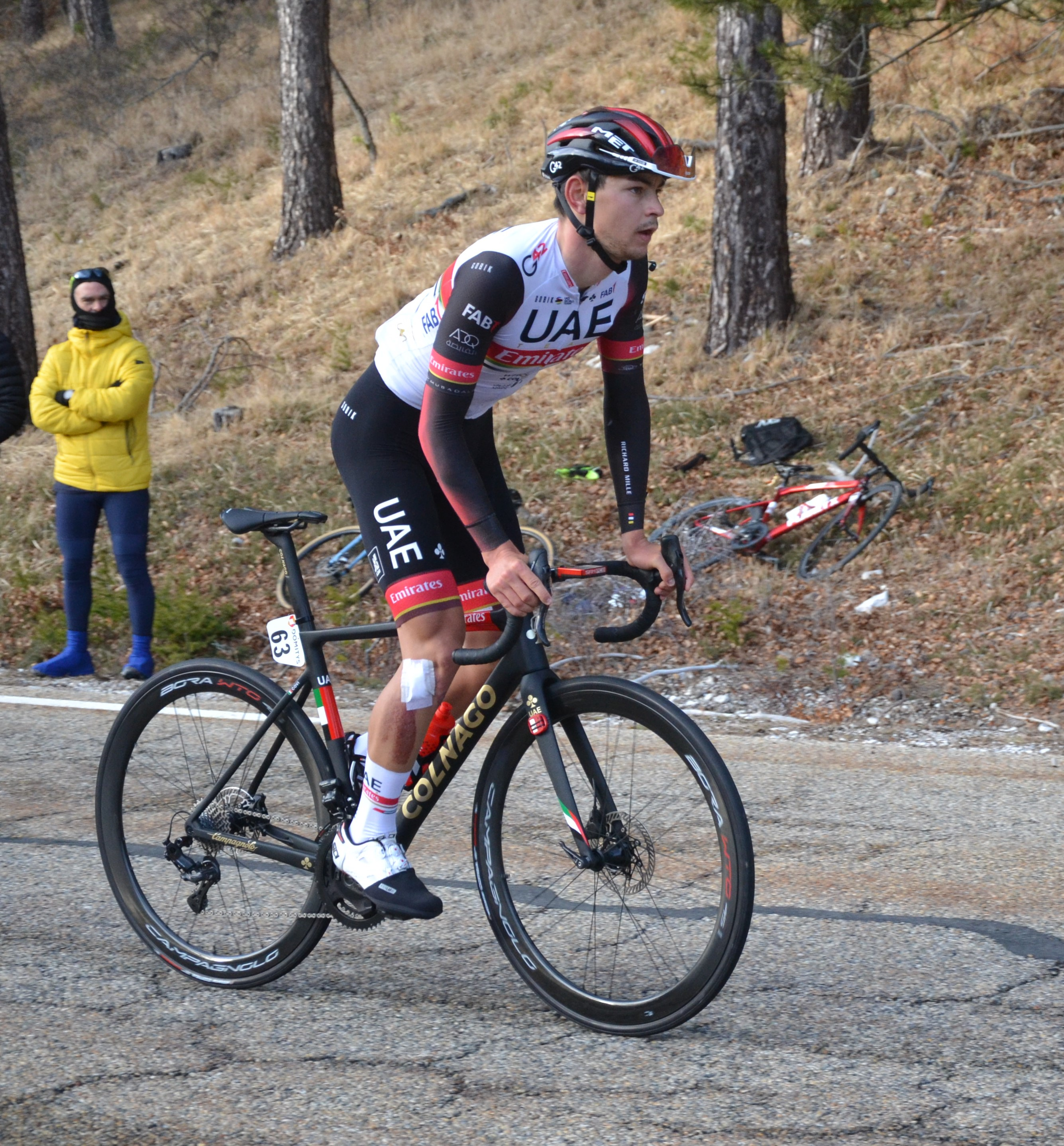
- Covi in 2021

Personal information
- Born: 28 September 1998 (age 28) Borgomanero, Italy
- Height: 1.8 m (5 ft 11 in)
- Weight: 66 kg (146 lb)

Cycling career
- Sport: Cycling
- Current team: Team Jayco–AlUla
- Discipline: Road
- Role: Rider

Amateur teams
- 2018: Team Colpack
- 2018: UAE Team Emirates (stagiaire)

Professional teams
- 2019: Team Colpack
- 2020–2025: UAE Team Emirates
- 2026–: Team Jayco–AlUla

Major wins
- Grand Tours Giro d'Italia 1 individual stage (2022) One-day races and Classics Giro del Veneto (2026)

Alessandro Covi (born 28 September 1998) is an Italian cyclist, who currently rides for UCI WorldTeam Team Jayco–AlUla. To date, the biggest win of his career is stage 20 of the 2022 Giro d'Italia, winning from the breakaway by a margin of 32 seconds to Domen Novak.

== Major results ==
2015
6th Trofeo Citta di Loano
8th Overall Tour du Pays de Vaud
2016
1st Montichiari–Roncone
1st Grand Prix Bati-Metallo
1st Stage 1 Tour du Pays de Vaud
2nd Overall Grand Prix Rüebliland
4th Tour of Flanders Juniors
2018
1st Stage 6 Tour de l'Avenir
2nd Overall Vuelta al Bidasoa
8th Overall Giro Ciclistico d'Italia
2019
4th Overall Giro Ciclistico d'Italia
2020
2nd Giro dell'Appennino
8th Coppa Sabatini
9th Brabantse Pijl
2021
2nd Coppa Bernocchi
3rd Overall Giro di Sicilia

1st Young rider classification

3rd Coppa Ugo Agostoni
5th Clásica de San Sebastián
5th Giro del Veneto
7th Circuito de Getxo
9th Tre Valli Varesine
2022 (3 pro wins)
1st Vuelta a Murcia
Giro d'Italia

1st Stage 20
Combativity award Stage 20

Vuelta a Andalucía

1st Points classification
1st Stage 2

3rd Trofeo Laigueglia
9th Gran Piemonte
9th Grand Prix La Marseillaise
2023
3rd Trofeo Laigueglia
2024
2nd Trofeo Matteotti
6th Memorial Marco Pantani
7th Vuelta a Murcia
2025 (2)
1st Stage 3 Vuelta a Asturias
2nd Road race, National Road Championships
2nd Overall Tour de Hongrie
4th Gran Premio Castellón
7th Overall Giro d'Abruzzo

1st Stage 1

10th Paris–Tours
2026 (1)
1st Giro del Veneto

=== Grand Tour general classification results timeline ===
Grand Tour	2021	2022	2023
Giro d'Italia	38	45	DNF
Tour de France	—	—	—
Vuelta a España	—	—	—

Legend
—	Did not compete
DNF	Did not finish
