= Alessandro Fancellu =

Italian racing cyclist (born 2000)

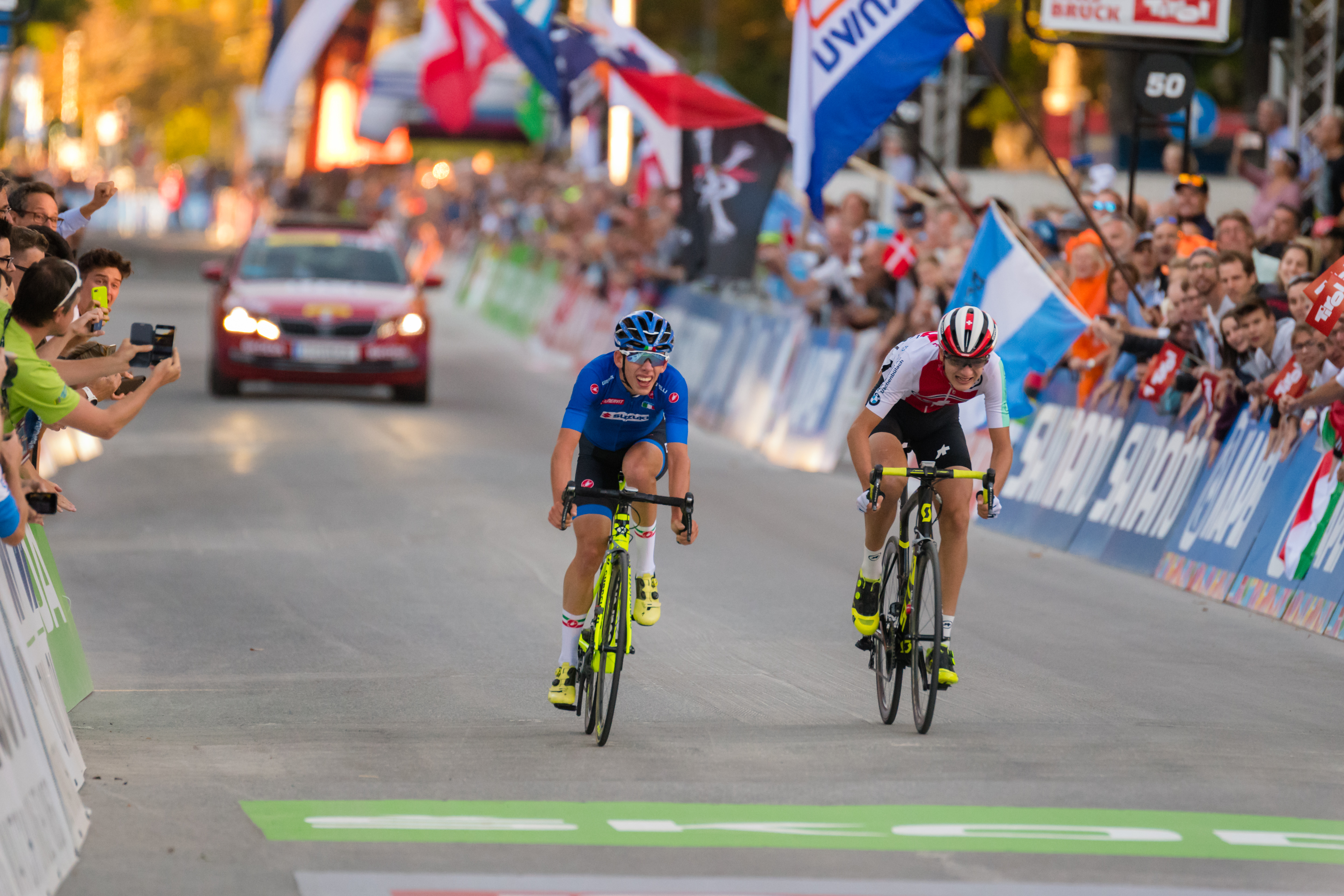
- Fancellu (left) in the junior men's road race at the 2018 UCI Road World Championships

Personal information
- Born: 24 April 2000 (age 26) Como, Italy
- Height: 1.72 m (5 ft 8 in)
- Weight: 62 kg (137 lb)

Cycling career
- Sport: Cycling
- Current team: MBH Bank CSB Telecom Fort
- Discipline: Road
- Role: Rider
- Rider type: Climber

Amateur team
- 2019: Kometa U23

Professional teams
- 2020–2023: Kometa Xstra Cycling Team
- 2020: Trek–Segafredo (stagiaire)
- 2024: Q36.5 Pro Cycling Team
- 2025: Team UKYO
- 2026–: MBH Bank CSB Telecom Fort

Alessandro Fancellu (born 24 April 2000) is an Italian cyclist who currently rides for UCI Pro Team MBH Bank CSB Telecom Fort. Fancellu previously rode for Kometa Xstra Cycling Team, where he was promoted to the senior team in 2020 after a year with their under-23 development side.

In the junior men's road race at the 2018 UCI Road World Championships, Fancellu finished over a minute and a half behind runaway winner Remco Evenepoel but managed to outsprint Alexandre Balmer to take the bronze medal. In 2020, from 1 August until the end of the year, Fancellu joined UCI WorldTeam Trek–Segafredo as a stagiaire.

== Early life ==
Fancellu started his sport career in association football, playing for local amateur side Oratorio Solbiate as an attacker before taking up cycling at the age of 12.

== Major results ==
2017
6th Trofeo Città di Loano
2018
3rd Road race, UCI Junior Road World Championships
5th Trofeo Città di Loano
6th Trofeo Emilio Paganessi
2019
1st Overall Vuelta Ciclista a León
2020
3rd Overall Tour of Antalya
2022
6th Overall Tour de l'Avenir
2024
9th Overall Okolo Slovenska
10th Overall Tour of Antalya
2025
1st Overall Tour of Japan

1st Stage 3

3rd Overall Czech Tour
5th Japan Cup
8th Overall AlUla Tour
8th Overall Giro d'Abruzzo
2026 (2 pro wins)
2nd Overall Czech Tour

1st Stage 4

3rd Overall Giro d'Abruzzo

1st Stage 1

4th Overall Tour of Slovenia
5th GP Industria & Artigianato di Larciano
5th Giro della Toscana
6th Overall Tour of Turkiye
6th Giro del Veneto
9th Milano–Torino
