= 2025 Japan Cup =

2025 Utsunomiya Japan Cup Cycle Road Race
2025 UCI ProSeries

Race details
- Dates: 19 October 2025
- Stages: 1
- Distance: 144.2 km (89.6 mi)
- Winning time: 3h 30' 00"

Results
	Winner	Lenny Martinez (FRA)	(Team Bahrain Victorious)
	Second	Alex Baudin (FRA)	(EF Education–EasyPost)
	Third	Ion Izagirre (ESP)	(Cofidis)

The 2025 Utsunomiya Japan Cup Cycle Road Race was the 32nd edition of the Japan Cup single-day cycling race. It was held on 19 October 2025, over a distance of 144.2 km, starting and finishing in Utsunomiya.

== Teams ==
Six UCI WorldTeams, four UCI ProTeams, eight UCI Continental teams, and the Japanese national team made up the 19 teams that participated in the race.

UCI WorldTeams

- Cofidis
- EF Education–EasyPost
- Intermarché–Wanty
- Lidl–Trek
- Team Bahrain Victorious
- Team Jayco–AlUla

UCI ProTeams

- Israel–Premier Tech
- Team Novo Nordisk
- Team Solution Tech–Vini Fantini
- Tudor Pro Cycling Team

UCI Continental Teams

- Aisan Racing Team
- Astemo Utsunomiya Blitzen
- Kinan Racing Team
- Pogi Team Gusto Ljubljana
- Shimano Racing Team
- Team Ukyo
- VC Fukuoka
- Victoire Hiroshima

National team

- Japan

== Results ==
Result
Rank	Rider	Team	Time
1	Lenny Martinez (FRA)	Team Bahrain Victorious	3h 30' 00"
2	Alex Baudin (FRA)	EF Education–EasyPost	+ 32"
3	Ion Izagirre (ESP)	Cofidis	+ 32"
4	Mathys Rondel (FRA)	Tudor Pro Cycling Team	+ 40"
5	Alessandro Fancellu (ITA)	JCL Team Ukyo	+ 40"
6	Riley Sheehan (USA)	Israel–Premier Tech	+ 49"
7	Michael Matthews (AUS)	Team Jayco–AlUla	+ 1' 46"
8	Sam Maisonobe (FRA)	Cofidis	+ 1' 49"
9	Julien Bernard (FRA)	Lidl–Trek	+ 2' 39"
10	Pau Martí (ESP)	Israel–Premier Tech	+ 2' 47"
