= Nicolò Garibbo =

Italian bicycle racer

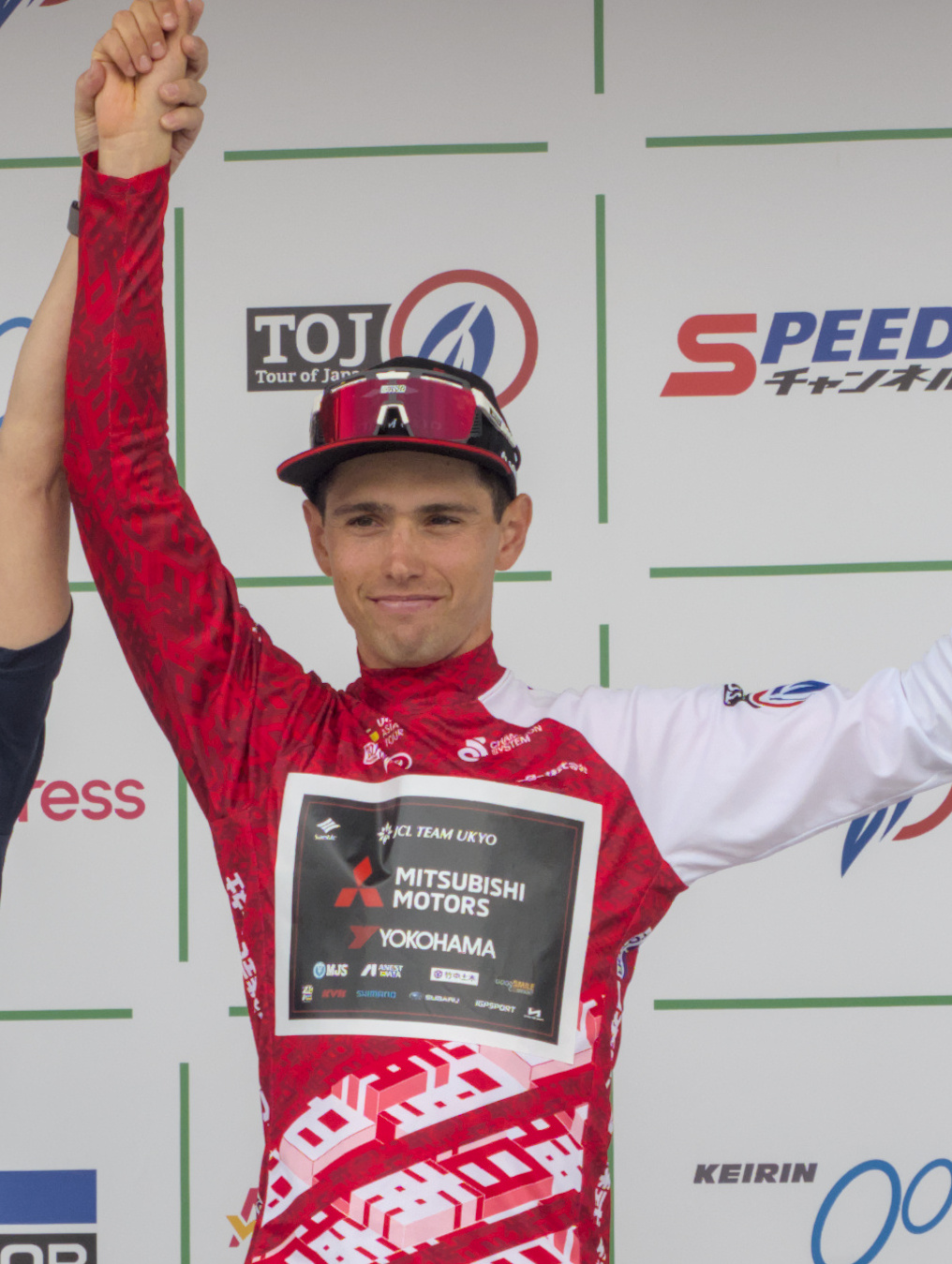
- Garibbo in 2025

Personal information
- Born: 29 June 1999 (age 27) Imperia, Italy
- Height: 1.68 m (5 ft 6 in)
- Weight: 57 kg (126 lb)

Cycling career
- Sport: Cycling
- Current team: Team UKYO
- Discipline: Road
- Role: Rider
- Rider type: Climber

Amateur teams
- 2016–2017: Ciclistica Biringhello
- 2018: Overall Cycling Team
- 2019: Velo Racing Palazzago
- 2020–2021: Maltinti-Banca Cambiano
- 2022: Parkpre Racing Team
- 2023: Gragnano Sporting Club

Professional teams
- 2018: D'Amico Utensilnord (stagiaire)
- 2024: Team Technipes #inEmiliaRomagna
- 2025–: Team UKYO

Nicolò Garibbo (born 29 June 1999) is an Italian cyclist, who currently rides for UCI Continental team Team UKYO.

Garibbo took his first pro win in February 2026 on stage one of the Giro di Sardegna, in a four man sprint.

== Major results ==
2022
1st Gran Premio Città di Montegranaro
2023
1st Overall Tour of Kosovo

1st Points classification
1st Stage 3

1st Memorial Daniele Tortoli
2024
1st Gran Premio Città di Empoli
1st Trofeo Matteotti Amateurs
2025
1st Mountains classification, Czech Tour
1st Mountains classification, Tour of Japan
1st Mountains classification, Tour de Kumano
3rd Overall Tour de Kyushu
3rd Overall Giro della Regione Friuli Venezia Giulia
5th Giro della Città Metropolitana di Reggio Calabria
8th Giro della Romagna
2026 (1 pro win)
1st Overall Giro della Regione Friuli Venezia Giulia

1st Stage 2

1st Stage 1 Giro di Sardegna
2nd Gran Premio Colli Rovescalesi
3rd Overall Tour de Kumano

1st Stage 3

5th Japan Cup
5th Giro del Medio Brenta
6th Overall Tour of Japan

1st Stage 3

9th Overall Giro d'Abruzzo
