= Giro della Regione Friuli Venezia Giulia =

Italian multi-day road cycling race

Giro del Friuli-Venezia Giulia
Race details
- Date: September
- Region: Friuli-Venezia Giulia
- Discipline: Road race
- Competition: UCI Europe Tour
- Type: Stage race

History
- First edition: 1963
- Editions: 40 (as of 2026)
- First winner: Felice Gimondi (ITA)
- Most recent: Nicolò Garibbo (ITA)

The Giro del Friuli-Venezia Giulia is a professional cycling race held annually in Italy. It is part of UCI Europe Tour in category 2.2.

== Winners ==
Year	Country	Rider	Team
1963	Italy	Felice Gimondi	
1975	Great Britain	Phil Edwards	
1985	Yugoslavia	Bruno Bulić	
1990	Italy	Vincenzo Galati	
1991	Italy	Gilberto Simoni	
1992	Italy	Cristian Zanolini	
1993	Italy	Gilberto Simoni	
1994	Italy	Rudy Mosole	
1995	Italy	Marco Fincato	
1996	Italy	Rodolfo Ongarato	
1997	Italy	Rodolfo Ongarato	
1998	Italy	Danilo Di Luca	
1999	Yugoslavia	Aleksander Nikacevic	
2000	Italy	Raffaele Ferrara	
2001	Ukraine	Ruslan Pidgornyy	
2002	Italy	Luca Solari	
2003	Ukraine	Ruslan Pidgornyy	
2004	Slovenia	Matej Mugerli	
2006	Russia	Boris Shpilevsky	
2007	Russia	Alexander Filippov	
2008	Croatia	Hrvoje Miholjević	
2009	Italy	Gianluca Brambilla	Zalf–Désirée–Fior
2010	Norway	Vegard Stake Laengen	Joker–Bianchi
2011	Italy	Matteo Busato	Zalf–Désirée–Fior
2012	Italy	Diego Rosa	Palazzago Elledent Rad Logistic
2013	Slovenia	Jan Polanc	Radenska
2014	Italy	Simone Antonini	Marchiol–Emisfero
2015	Belgium	Gaëtan Bille	Verandas Willems
2018	Slovenia	Tadej Pogačar	Ljubljana Gusto Xaurum
2019	France	Clément Champoussin	Chambéry CF
2020	Norway	Andreas Leknessund	Uno-X Pro Cycling Team
2021	Germany	Jonas Rapp	Hrinkow Advarics Cycleang
2022	Belgium	Emiel Verstrynge	Alpecin–Fenix Development Team
2023	Italy	Francesco Galimberti	Biesse–Carrera
2024	Norway	Jørgen Nordhagen	Visma–Lease a Bike Development
2025	Germany	Lennart Jasch	Red Bull–Bora–Hansgrohe Rookies
2026	Italy	Nicolò Garibbo	Team UKYO
