= 2026 Giro del Veneto =

2026 UCI ProSeries

Race details
- Dates: 14 October 2026
- Stages: 1
- Distance: 167 km (104 mi)
- Winning time: 3h 35' 52"

Results
	Winner	Alessandro Covi (ITA)	(Team Jayco–AlUla)
	Second	Anthon Charmig (DEN)	(Uno-X Mobility)
	Third	Benoît Cosnefroy (FRA)	(UAE Team Emirates XRG)

The 2026 Giro del Veneto was the 89th edition of the Giro del Veneto road cycling one day race, which was held on 14 October 2026 as part of the 2026 UCI ProSeries calendar.

== Teams ==
Seven UCI WorldTeams, nine UCI ProTeams, and five UCI Continental teams made up the twenty-one teams that participated in the race.

UCI WorldTeams

- Groupama–FDJ United
- Movistar Team
- NSN Cycling Team
- Team Jayco–AlUla
- UAE Team Emirates XRG
- Uno-X Mobility
- XDS Astana Team

UCI ProTeams

- Bardiani–CSF 7 Saber
- Caja Rural–Seguros RGA
- Cofidis
- Euskaltel–Euskadi
- MBH Bank CSB Telecom Fort
- Pinarello–Q36.5 Pro Cycling Team
- Solution Tech NIPPO Rali
- Team Polti VisitMalta
- Tudor Pro Cycling Team

UCI Continental Teams

- Biesse–Carrera–Premac
- Campana Imballaggi–Morbiato–Trentino
- General Store–Essegibi–Fratelli Curia
- S.C. Padovani Polo Cherry Bank
- Swatt Club

== Results ==
Result
Rank	Rider	Team	Time
1	Alessandro Covi (ITA)	Team Jayco–AlUla	3h 35' 52"
2	Anthon Charmig (DEN)	Uno-X Mobility	+ 0"
3	Benoît Cosnefroy (FRA)	UAE Team Emirates XRG	+ 0"
4	Fabio Christen (SUI)	Pinarello–Q36.5 Pro Cycling Team	+ 0"
5	Christian Scaroni (ITA)	XDS Astana Team	+ 0"
6	Alessandro Fancellu (ITA)	MBH Bank CSB Telecom Fort	+ 0"
7	Roger Adrià (ESP)	Movistar Team	+ 0"
8	Clément Izquierdo (FRA)	Cofidis	+ 0"
9	Ludovico Crescioli (ITA)	Team Polti VisitMalta	+ 0"
10	Simone Velasco (ITA)	XDS Astana Team	+ 0"
