= 2026 Giro d'Abruzzo =

2026 UCI Europe Tour

Race details
- Dates: 15–18 September 2026
- Stages: 4
- Distance: 639 km (397 mi)
- Winning time: 15h 03' 12"

Results
Jersey awarded to the overall winner	Winner	Kévin Vauquelin (FRA)	(Netcompany INEOS)
	Second	Mathys Rondel (FRA)	(Tudor Pro Cycling Team)
	Third	Alessandro Fancellu (ITA)	(MBH Bank CSB Telecom Fort)
Jersey awarded to the points classification winner	Points	Dorian Godon (FRA)	(Netcompany INEOS)
Jersey awarded to the mountains classification winner	Mountains	Emanuele Ansaloni (ITA)	(Team Technipes #inEmiliaRomagna Caffè Borbone)
Jersey awarded to the young rider classification winner	Young rider	Kévin Vauquelin (FRA)	(Netcompany INEOS)
	Team	(Kazakhstan) XDS Astana Development Team	

The 2026 Giro d'Abruzzo is a men's road cycling stage race which takes place in the Abruzzo Region of Italy, from 15 to 18 September 2026. It is the 37th edition of the Giro d'Abruzzo since the race started in 1961 and the 8th edition under the Giro d'Abruzzo name, and is rated as a 2.1 event on the 2026 UCI Europe Tour calendar.

== Teams ==
One UCI WorldTeam, eight UCI ProTeams, and eleven UCI Continental teams made up the twenty teams that participated in the race.

UCI WorldTeams

- Netcompany INEOS

UCI ProTeams

- Bardiani–CSF 7 Saber
- Caja Rural–Seguros RGA
- Euskaltel–Euskadi
- MBH Bank CSB Telecom Fort
- Solution Tech NIPPO Rali
- Team Polti VisitMalta
- Tudor Pro Cycling Team
- Unibet Rose Rockets

UCI Continental Teams

- EF Education–Aevolo
- General Store–Essegibi–Fratelli Curia
- Gragnano Sporting Club
- MG.K Vis Costruzioni e Ambiente
- NSN Development Team
- S.C. Padovani Polo Cherry Bank
- Swatt Club
- Team UKYO
- Team Technipes #inEmiliaRomagna Caffè Borbone
- Team Vorarlberg
- XDS Astana Development Team

== Route ==
Stage characteristics and winners
Stage	Date	Route	Distance	Type	Stage winner
1	15 September	Cupello to Casalincontrada	155 km (96 mi)	Hilly stage	Alessandro Fancellu (ITA)
2	16 September	Popoli Terme to Caramanico Terme	143 km (89 mi)	Hilly stage	Lennart Jasch (GER)
3	17 September	Oricola (Piana del Cavaliere) to San Benedetto dei Marsi	159 km (99 mi)	Hilly stage	Filippo D'Aiuto (ITA)
4	18 September	Silvi to Controguerra	182 km (113 mi)	Hilly stage	Kévin Vauquelin (FRA)
Total			639 km (397 mi)		

== Stages ==
=== Stage 1 ===
15 September 2026 – Cupello to Casalincontrada, 155 km (96 mi)

Stage 1 Result
Rank	Rider	Team	Time
1	Alessandro Fancellu (ITA)	MBH Bank CSB Telecom Fort	3h 51' 24"
2	Mathys Rondel (FRA)	Tudor Pro Cycling Team	+ 2"
3	Diego Ulissi (ITA)	XDS Astana Development Team	+ 2"
4	Kévin Vauquelin (FRA)	Netcompany INEOS	+ 2"
5	Nicolò Garibbo (ITA)	Team UKYO	+ 2"
6	Ludovico Crescioli (ITA)	Team Polti VisitMalta	+ 2"
7	Nicola Conci (ITA)	XDS Astana Development Team	+ 2"
8	Domenico Pozzovivo (ITA)	Solution Tech NIPPO Rali	+ 8"
9	Cedrik Bakke Christophersen (NOR)	Unibet Rose Rockets	+ 10"
10	Matteo Fabbro (ITA)	Solution Tech NIPPO Rali	+ 10"

General classification after Stage 1
Rank	Rider	Team	Time
1	Alessandro Fancellu (ITA)	MBH Bank CSB Telecom Fort	3h 51' 14"
2	Mathys Rondel (FRA)	Tudor Pro Cycling Team	+ 6"
3	Diego Ulissi (ITA)	XDS Astana Development Team	+ 8"
4	Kévin Vauquelin (FRA)	Netcompany INEOS	+ 12"
5	Nicolò Garibbo (ITA)	Team UKYO	+ 12"
6	Ludovico Crescioli (ITA)	Team Polti VisitMalta	+ 12"
7	Nicola Conci (ITA)	XDS Astana Development Team	+ 12"
8	Domenico Pozzovivo (ITA)	Solution Tech NIPPO Rali	+ 18"
9	Cedrik Bakke Christophersen (NOR)	Unibet Rose Rockets	+ 20"
10	Matteo Fabbro (ITA)	Solution Tech NIPPO Rali	+ 20"

=== Stage 2 ===
16 September 2026 – Popoli Terme to Caramanico Terme, 143 km (89 mi)

Stage 2 Result
Rank	Rider	Team	Time
1	Lennart Jasch (GER)	Tudor Pro Cycling Team	3h 36' 25"
2	Dorian Godon (FRA)	Netcompany INEOS	+ 9"
3	Matteo Scalco (ITA)	XDS Astana Development Team	+ 9"
4	Tommaso Dati (ITA)	Team UKYO	+ 9"
5	Nicolò Garibbo (ITA)	Team UKYO	+ 9"
6	Ludovico Crescioli (ITA)	Team Polti VisitMalta	+ 9"
7	Riccardo Lorello (ITA)	S.C. Padovani Polo Cherry Bank	+ 9"
8	Giacomo Ballabio (ITA)	Team Vorarlberg	+ 9"
9	Riccardo Barbuto (ITA)	Team Technipes #inEmiliaRomagna Caffè Borbone	+ 9"
10	Xabier Berastegi (ESP)	Euskaltel–Euskadi	+ 9"

General classification after Stage 2
Rank	Rider	Team	Time
1	Alessandro Fancellu (ITA)	MBH Bank CSB Telecom Fort	7h 27' 48"
2	Lennart Jasch (GER)	Tudor Pro Cycling Team	+ 4"
3	Mathys Rondel (FRA)	Tudor Pro Cycling Team	+ 6"
4	Diego Ulissi (ITA)	XDS Astana Development Team	+ 8"
5	Nicolò Garibbo (ITA)	Team UKYO	+ 12"
6	Ludovico Crescioli (ITA)	Team Polti VisitMalta	+ 12"
7	Kévin Vauquelin (FRA)	Netcompany INEOS	+ 12"
8	Nicola Conci (ITA)	XDS Astana Development Team	+ 12"
9	Dorian Godon (FRA)	Netcompany INEOS	+ 17"
10	Domenico Pozzovivo (ITA)	Solution Tech NIPPO Rali	+ 18"

=== Stage 3 ===
17 September 2026 – Oricola (Piana del Cavaliere) to San Benedetto dei Marsi, 159 km (99 mi)

Stage 3 Result
Rank	Rider	Team	Time
1	Filippo D'Aiuto (ITA)	General Store–Essegibi–Fratelli Curia	3h 15' 31"
2	Dorian Godon (FRA)	Netcompany INEOS	+ 2"
3	Tommaso Dati (ITA)	Team UKYO	+ 2"
4	Luca Colnaghi (ITA)	Bardiani–CSF 7 Saber	+ 2"
5	Riccardo Lorello (ITA)	S.C. Padovani Polo Cherry Bank	+ 2"
6	Tommaso Bessega (ITA)	Team Polti VisitMalta	+ 2"
7	Andrea D'Amato (ITA)	Team UKYO	+ 2"
8	Ludovico Crescioli (ITA)	Team Polti VisitMalta	+ 2"
9	Alessandro Fancellu (ITA)	MBH Bank CSB Telecom Fort	+ 2"
10	Kévin Vauquelin (FRA)	Netcompany INEOS	+ 2"

General classification after Stage 3
Rank	Rider	Team	Time
1	Alessandro Fancellu (ITA)	MBH Bank CSB Telecom Fort	10h 43' 31"
2	Lennart Jasch (GER)	Tudor Pro Cycling Team	+ 8"
3	Mathys Rondel (FRA)	Tudor Pro Cycling Team	+ 10"
4	Dorian Godon (FRA)	Netcompany INEOS	+ 11"
5	Ludovico Crescioli (ITA)	Team Polti VisitMalta	+ 12"
6	Kévin Vauquelin (FRA)	Netcompany INEOS	+ 12"
7	Diego Ulissi (ITA)	XDS Astana Development Team	+ 12"
8	Nicolò Garibbo (ITA)	Team UKYO	+ 16"
9	Nicola Conci (ITA)	XDS Astana Development Team	+ 16"
10	Domenico Pozzovivo (ITA)	Solution Tech NIPPO Rali	+ 22"

=== Stage 4 ===
18 September 2026 – Silvi to Controguerra, 182 km (113 mi)

Stage 4 Result
Rank	Rider	Team	Time
1	Kévin Vauquelin (FRA)	Netcompany INEOS	3h 15' 31"
2	Mathys Rondel (FRA)	Tudor Pro Cycling Team	+ 0"
3	Nicola Conci (ITA)	XDS Astana Development Team	+ 2"
4	Dorian Godon (FRA)	Netcompany INEOS	+ 7"
5	Diego Ulissi (ITA)	XDS Astana Development Team	+ 7"
6	Ludovico Crescioli (ITA)	Team Polti VisitMalta	+ 7"
7	Nicolò Garibbo (ITA)	Team UKYO	+ 7"
8	Filippo Turconi (ITA)	Bardiani–CSF 7 Saber	+ 7"
9	Giacomo Ballabio (ITA)	Team Vorarlberg	+ 7"
10	Lennart Jasch (GER)	Tudor Pro Cycling Team	+ 7"

General classification after Stage 4
Rank	Rider	Team	Time
1	Kévin Vauquelin (FRA)	Netcompany INEOS	15h 03' 12"
2	Mathys Rondel (FRA)	Tudor Pro Cycling Team	+ 2"
3	Alessandro Fancellu (ITA)	MBH Bank CSB Telecom Fort	+ 5"
4	Nicola Conci (ITA)	XDS Astana Development Team	+ 12"
5	Lennart Jasch (GER)	Tudor Pro Cycling Team	+ 13"
6	Dorian Godon (FRA)	Netcompany INEOS	+ 16"
7	Ludovico Crescioli (ITA)	Team Polti VisitMalta	+ 17"
8	Diego Ulissi (ITA)	XDS Astana Development Team	+ 17"
9	Nicolò Garibbo (ITA)	Team UKYO	+ 21"
10	Domenico Pozzovivo (ITA)	Solution Tech NIPPO Rali	+ 27"

== Classification leadership table ==
Classification leadership by stage
Stage	Winner	General classification	Points classification	Mountains classification	Young rider classification	Team classification
1	Alessandro Fancellu	Alessandro Fancellu	Alessandro Fancellu (Note: On stage 2, Diego Ulissi, who was third in the points classification, wore the cyclamen jersey, because first-placed Alessandro Fancellu wore the green jersey as the leader of the general classification, and second-placed Mathys Rondel wore the white jersey as the leader of the young rider classification. On stage 3, Lennart Jasch, who was second in the points classification, wore the cyclamen jersey, because first-placed Alessandro Fancellu wore the green jersey as the leader of the general classification.)	Filippo D'Aiuto	Mathys Rondel	XDS Astana Development Team
2	Lennart Jasch	Alessandro Fancellu	Alessandro Fancellu	Emanuele Ansaloni	Mathys Rondel	XDS Astana Development Team
3	Filippo D'Aiuto	Alessandro Fancellu	Dorian Godon	Emanuele Ansaloni	Mathys Rondel	XDS Astana Development Team
4	Kévin Vauquelin	Kévin Vauquelin	Dorian Godon	Emanuele Ansaloni	Kévin Vauquelin	XDS Astana Development Team
Final		Kévin Vauquelin	Dorian Godon	Emanuele Ansaloni	Kévin Vauquelin	XDS Astana Development Team

== Classification standings ==
Legend
Denotes the winner of the general classification	Denotes the winner of the mountains classification
Denotes the winner of the points classification	Denotes the winner of the young rider classification

=== General classification ===
Final general classification
Rank	Rider	Team	Time
1	Kévin Vauquelin (FRA)	Netcompany INEOS	15h 03' 12"
2	Mathys Rondel (FRA)	Tudor Pro Cycling Team	+ 2"
3	Alessandro Fancellu (ITA)	MBH Bank CSB Telecom Fort	+ 5"
4	Nicola Conci (ITA)	XDS Astana Development Team	+ 12"
5	Lennart Jasch (GER)	Tudor Pro Cycling Team	+ 13"
6	Dorian Godon (FRA)	Netcompany INEOS	+ 16"
7	Ludovico Crescioli (ITA)	Team Polti VisitMalta	+ 17"
8	Diego Ulissi (ITA)	XDS Astana Development Team	+ 17"
9	Nicolò Garibbo (ITA)	Team UKYO	+ 21"
10	Domenico Pozzovivo (ITA)	Solution Tech NIPPO Rali	+ 27"

=== Points classification ===
Final points classification
Rank	Rider	Team	Points
1	Dorian Godon (FRA)	Netcompany INEOS	27
2	Kévin Vauquelin (FRA)	Netcompany INEOS	20
3	Mathys Rondel (FRA)	Tudor Pro Cycling Team	20
4	Ludovico Crescioli (ITA)	Team Polti VisitMalta	18
5	Nicolò Garibbo (ITA)	Team UKYO	16
6	Filippo D'Aiuto (ITA)	General Store–Essegibi–Fratelli Curia	15
7	Tommaso Dati (ITA)	Team UKYO	15
8	Alessandro Fancellu (ITA)	MBH Bank CSB Telecom Fort	14
9	Diego Ulissi (ITA)	XDS Astana Development Team	14
10	Lennart Jasch (GER)	Tudor Pro Cycling Team	13

=== Mountains classification ===
Final mountains classification
Rank	Rider	Team	Points
1	Emanuele Ansaloni (ITA)	Team Technipes #inEmiliaRomagna Caffè Borbone	39
2	Filippo D'Aiuto (ITA)	General Store–Essegibi–Fratelli Curia	22
3	Kévin Vauquelin (FRA)	Netcompany INEOS	16
4	Mathys Rondel (FRA)	Tudor Pro Cycling Team	16
5	Adrián Benito (ESP)	Team Polti VisitMalta	14
6	Nicola Conci (ITA)	XDS Astana Development Team	12
7	Txomin Juaristi (ESP)	Euskaltel–Euskadi	12
8	Álvaro García (ESP)	NSN Development Team	7
9	Manuel Oioli (ITA)	Swatt Club	7
10	Matteo Scalco (ITA)	XDS Astana Development Team	6

=== Young rider classification ===
Final young rider classification
Rank	Rider	Team	Time
1	Kévin Vauquelin (FRA)	Netcompany INEOS	15h 03' 12"
2	Mathys Rondel (FRA)	Tudor Pro Cycling Team	+ 2"
3	Ludovico Crescioli (ITA)	Team Polti VisitMalta	+ 17"
4	Cedrik Bakke Christophersen (NOR)	Unibet Rose Rockets	+ 29"
5	Matteo Scalco (ITA)	XDS Astana Development Team	+ 30"
6	Filippo Turconi (ITA)	Bardiani–CSF 7 Saber	+ 32"
7	Jan Castellon (ESP)	Caja Rural–Seguros RGA	+ 34"
8	Davide De Cassan (ITA)	General Store–Essegibi–Fratelli Curia	+ 40"
9	Tomos Pattinson (GBR)	EF Education–Aevolo	+ 45"
10	Samuel Bertolli (ITA)	Solution Tech NIPPO Rali	+ 45"

=== Team classification ===
Final team classification (1–10)
Rank	Team	Time
1	(Kazakhstan) XDS Astana Development Team	45h 10' 47"
2	(Italy) Bardiani–CSF 7 Saber	+ 52"
3	(France) Unibet Rose Rockets	+ 1' 59"
4	(United States) EF Education–Aevolo	+ 2' 16"
5	(Spain) Euskaltel–Euskadi	+ 2' 25"
6	(Italy) Solution Tech NIPPO Rali	+ 2' 29"
7	(Spain) Caja Rural–Seguros RGA	+ 3' 03"
8	(Switzerland) NSN Development Team	+ 3' 22"
9	(Switzerland) Tudor Pro Cycling Team	+ 3' 25"
10	(Italy) Team Polti VisitMalta	+ 3' 33"
