= 2025 Tour de Hongrie =

2025 UCI ProSeries
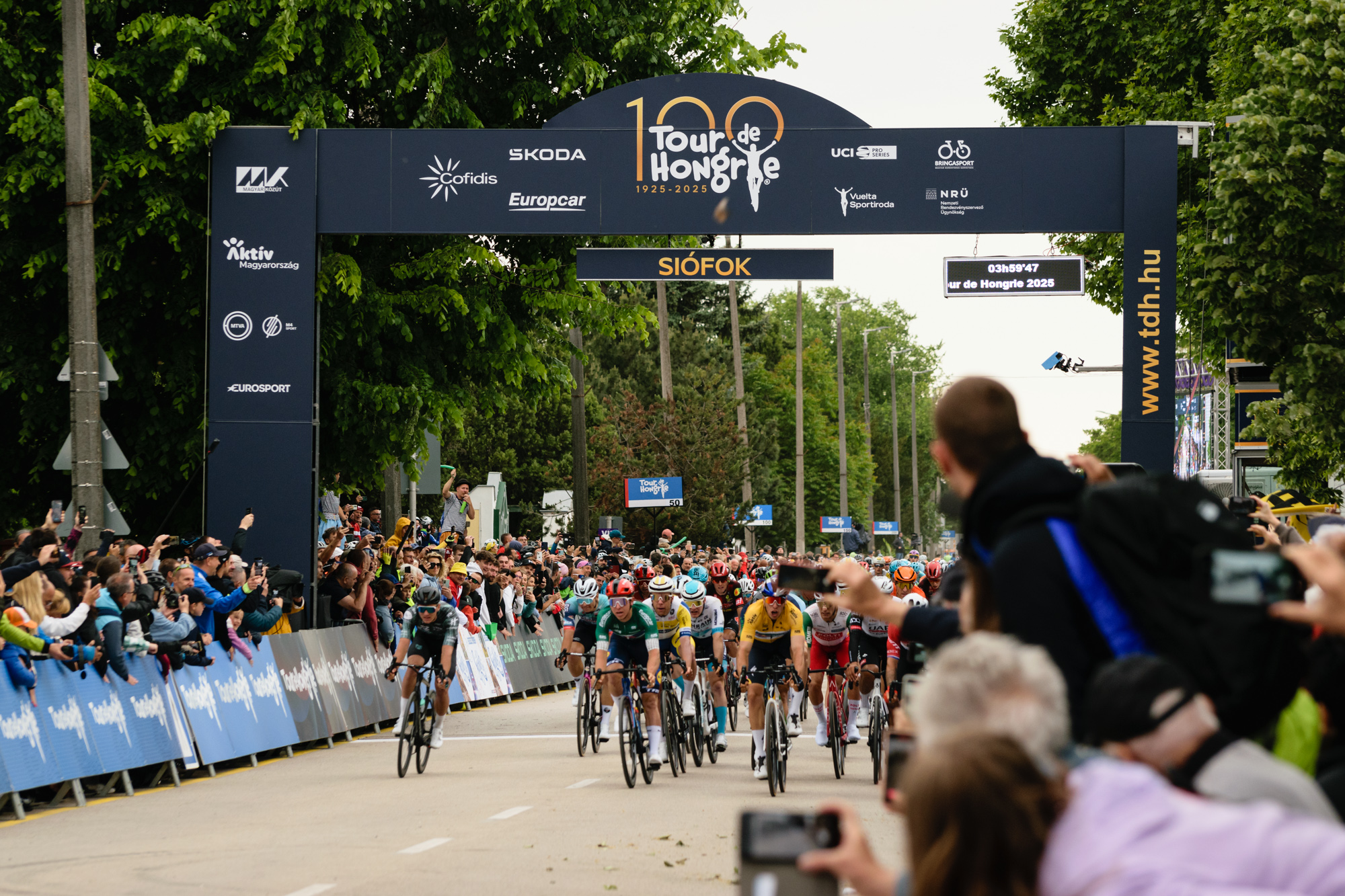
- Stage 2 finish in Siófok, Hungary

Race details
- Dates: 14–18 May 2025
- Stages: 5
- Distance: 875 km (544 mi)
- Winning time: 18h 56' 53"

Results
Jersey awarded to the overall winner	Winner	Harold Martín López (ECU)	(XDS Astana Team)
	Second	Alessandro Covi (ITA)	(UAE Team Emirates XRG)
	Third	Albert Withen Philipsen (DEN)	(Lidl–Trek)
Jersey awarded to the points classification winner	Points	Danny van Poppel (NED)	(Red Bull–Bora–Hansgrohe)
Jersey awarded to the mountains classification winner	Mountains	Siebe Deweirdt (BEL)	(Team Flanders–Baloise)
	Team	(France) Unibet Tietema Rockets	

The 2025 Tour de Hongrie was the 46th edition of the Tour de Hongrie, which took place between 14 and 18 May 2025. It was the eleventh edition since the race's revival in 2015, and was rated as a 2.Pro-category event as part of the 2025 UCI ProSeries.

== Teams ==
Six of the eighteen UCI WorldTeams, nine UCI ProTeams, and six UCI Continental teams made up the 21 teams that participated in the race, with seven riders each.

UCI WorldTeams

- Lidl–Trek
- Red Bull–Bora–Hansgrohe
- Team Bahrain Victorious
- Team Jayco–AlUla
- UAE Team Emirates XRG
- XDS Astana Team

UCI ProTeams

- Caja Rural–Seguros RGA
- Equipo Kern Pharma
- Euskaltel–Euskadi
- Q36.5 Pro Cycling Team
- Team Flanders–Baloise
- Team Novo Nordisk
- Team Polti VisitMalta
- Unibet Tietema Rockets
- VF Group–Bardiani–CSF–Faizanè

UCI Continental Teams

- Epronex–Hungary Cycling Team
- Karcag Cycling ÉPKAR Team
- MBH Bank Ballan CSB
- Pauwels Sauzen–Cibel Clementines
- Pierre Baguette Cycling
- Team United Shipping
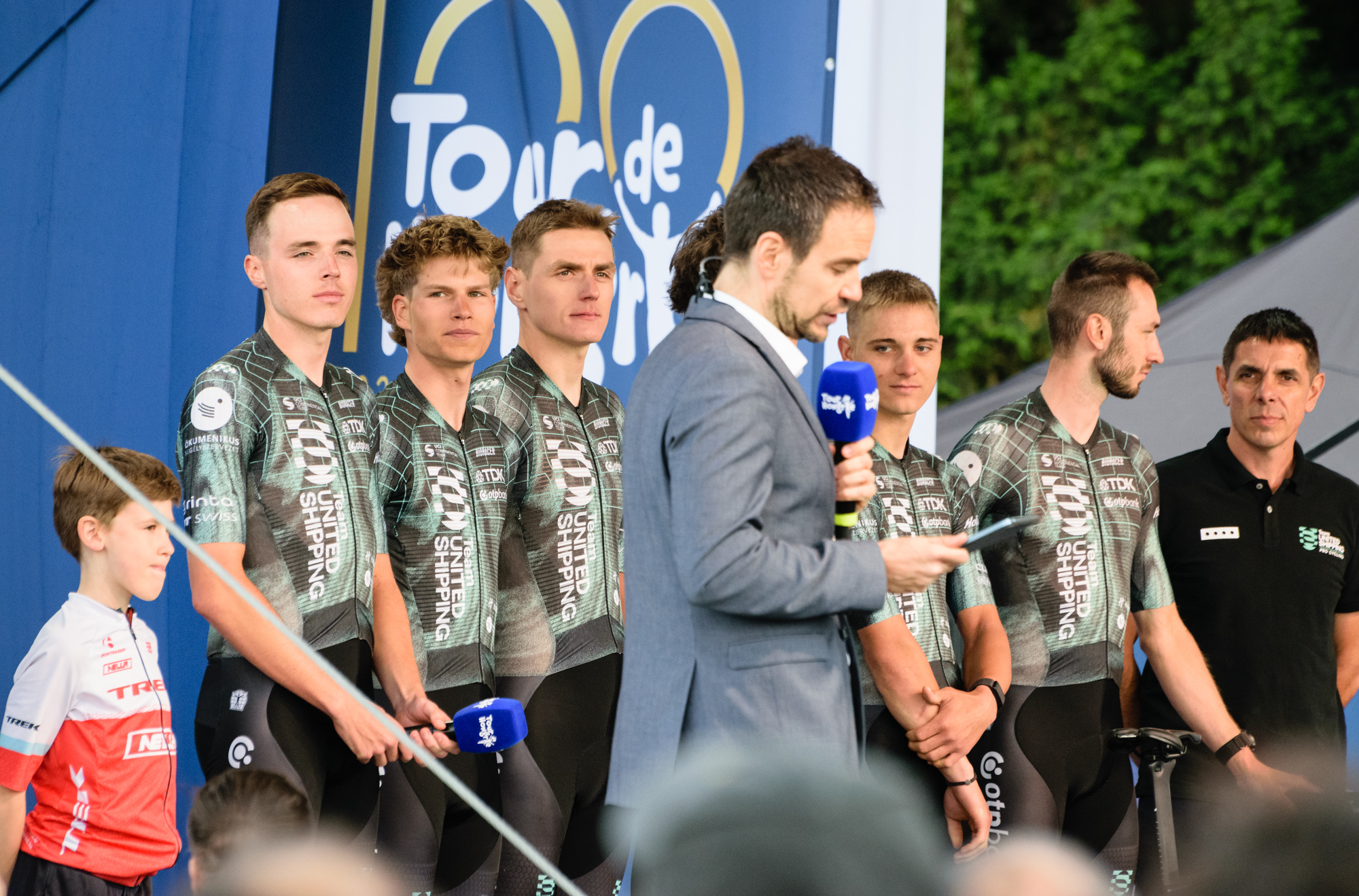
Team United Shipping

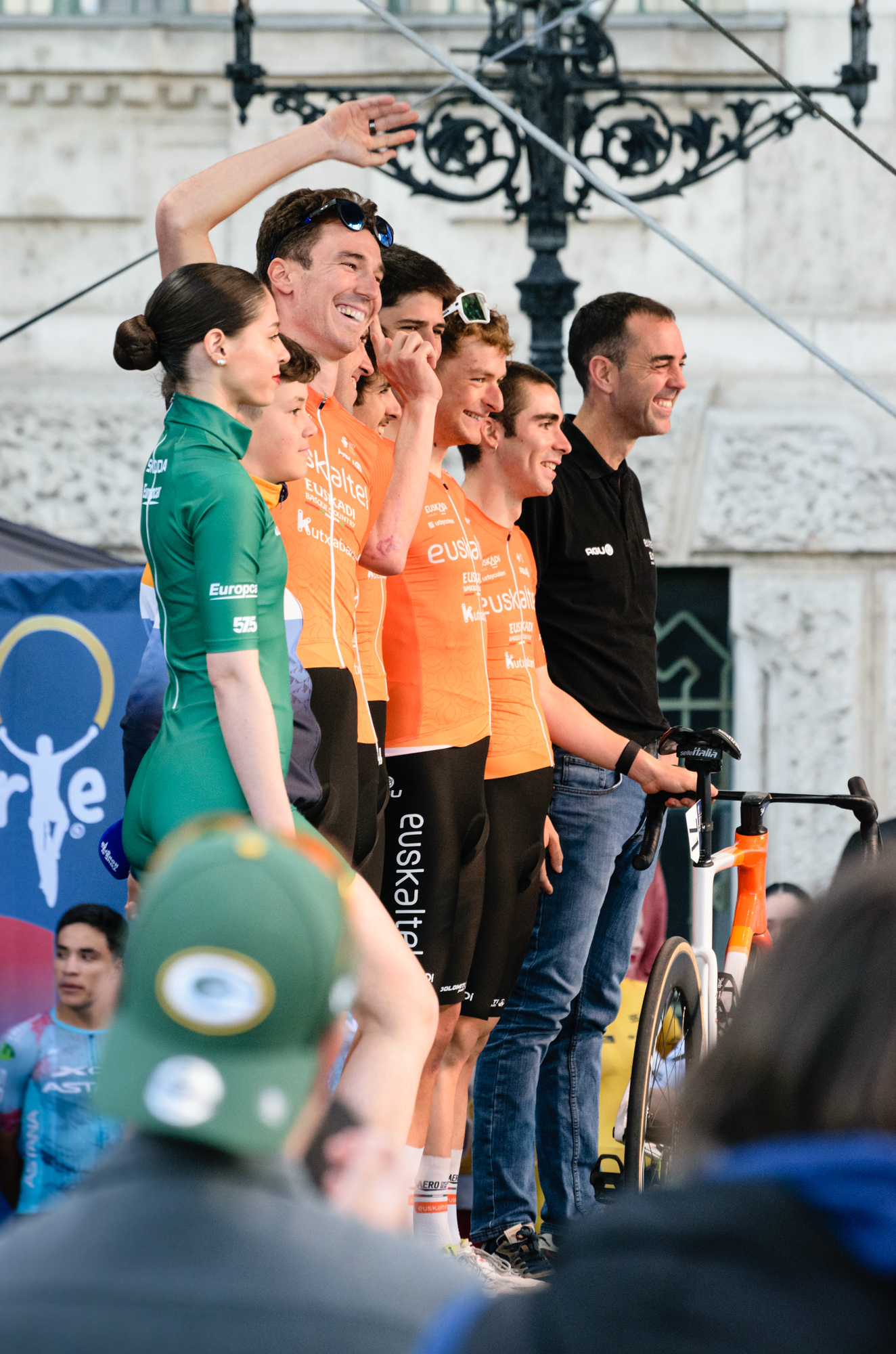
Euskaltel-Euskadi

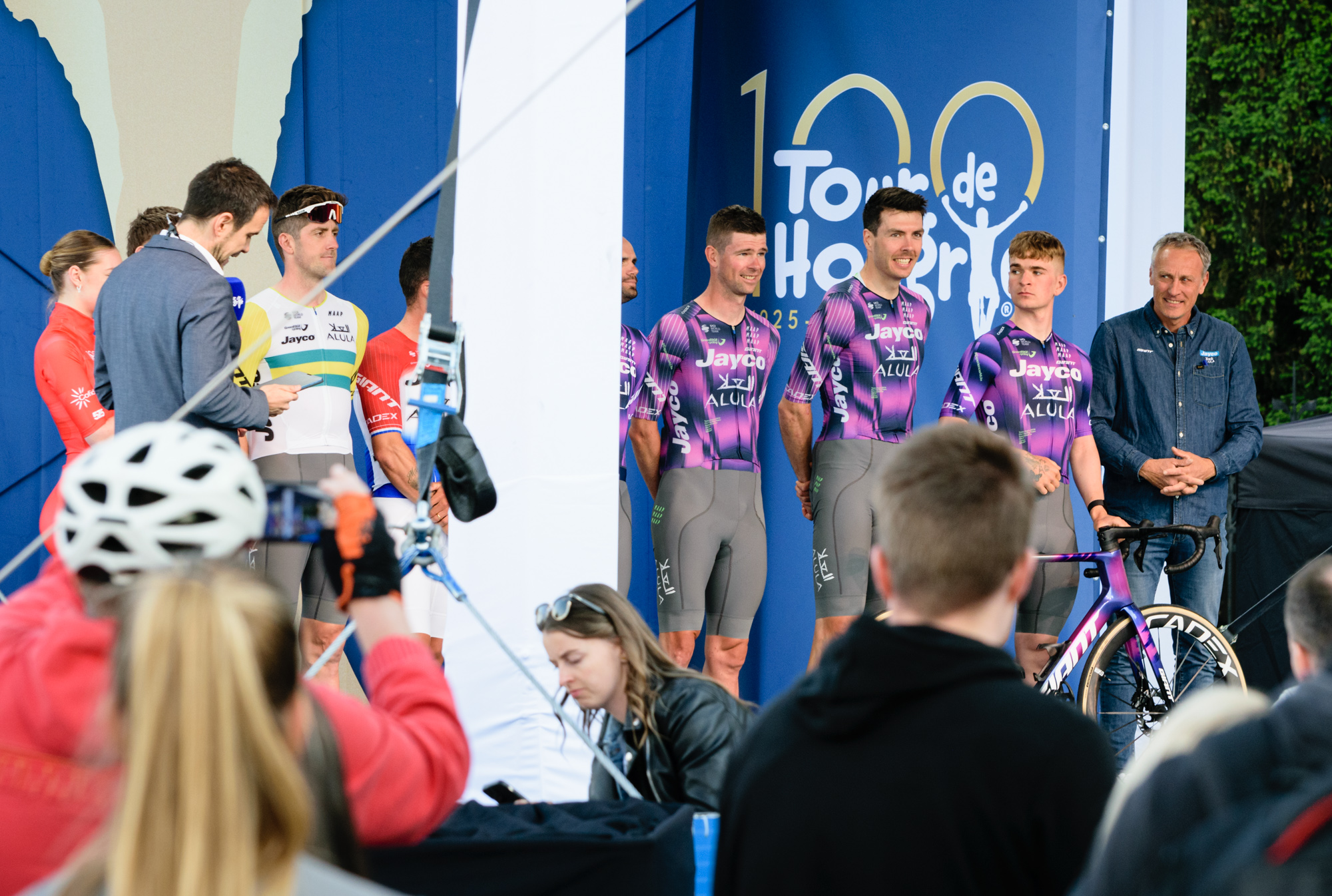
Team Jayco AlUla

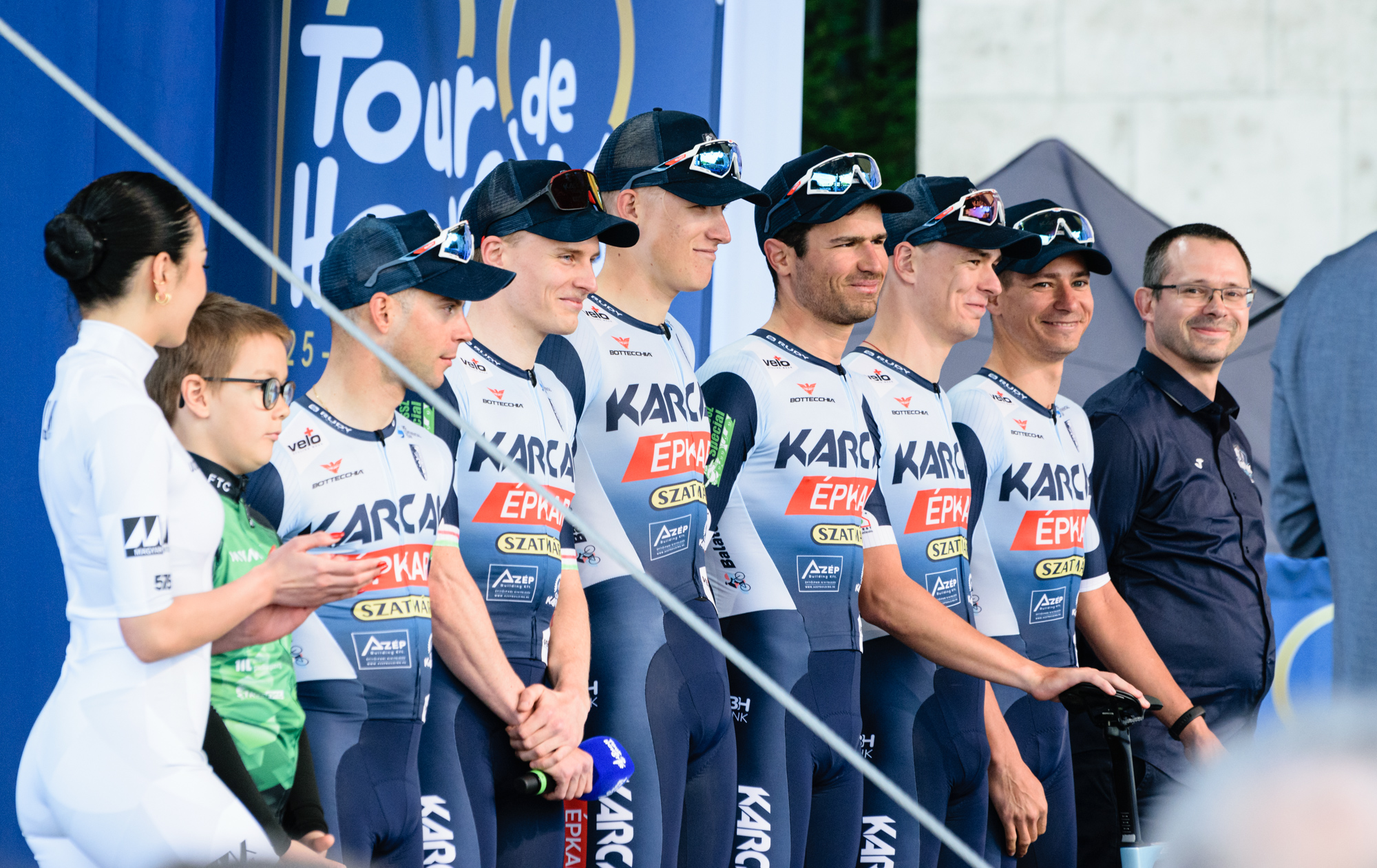
Karcag Cycling ÉPKAR Team

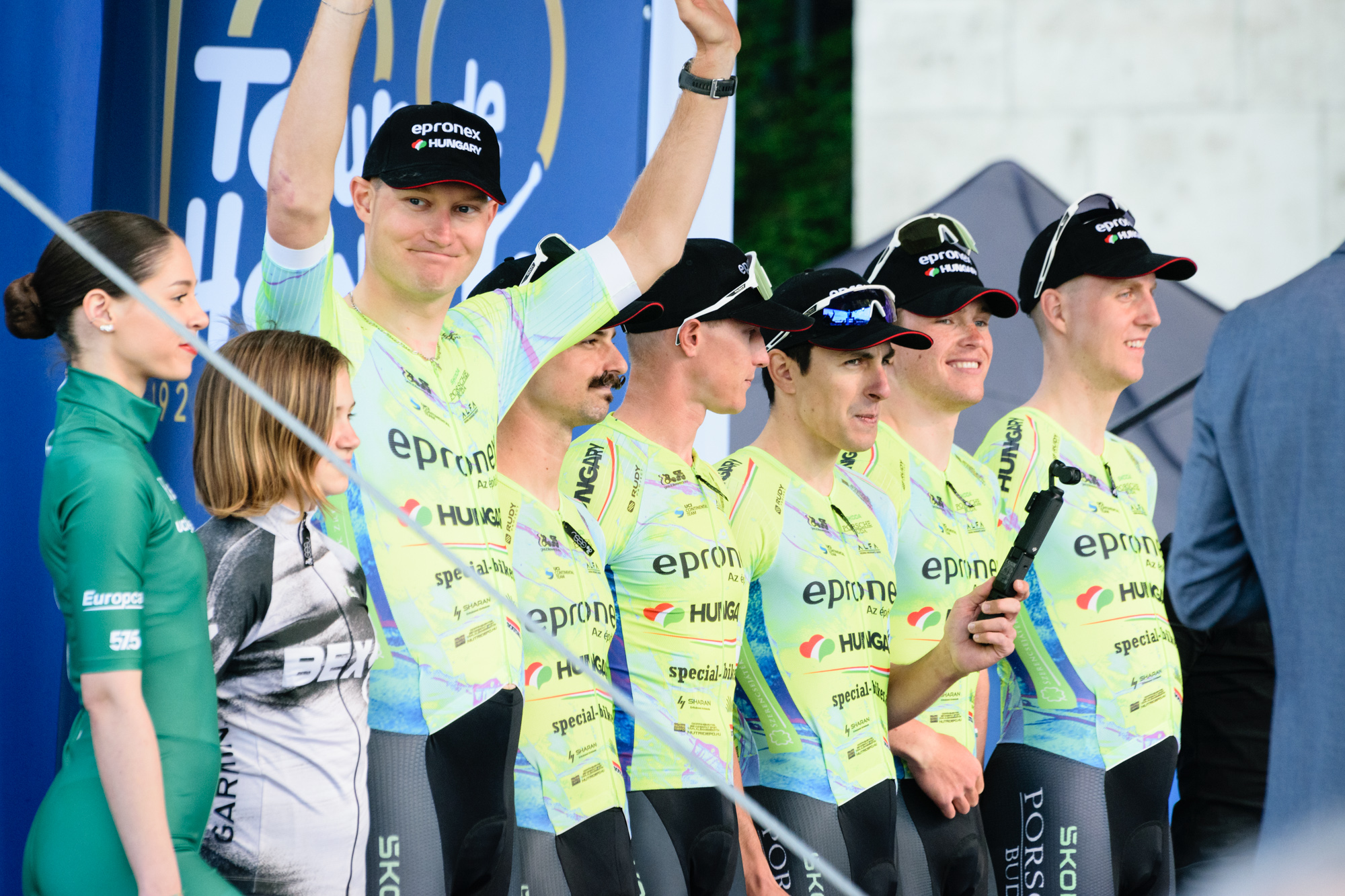
Epronex-Hungary Cycling Team

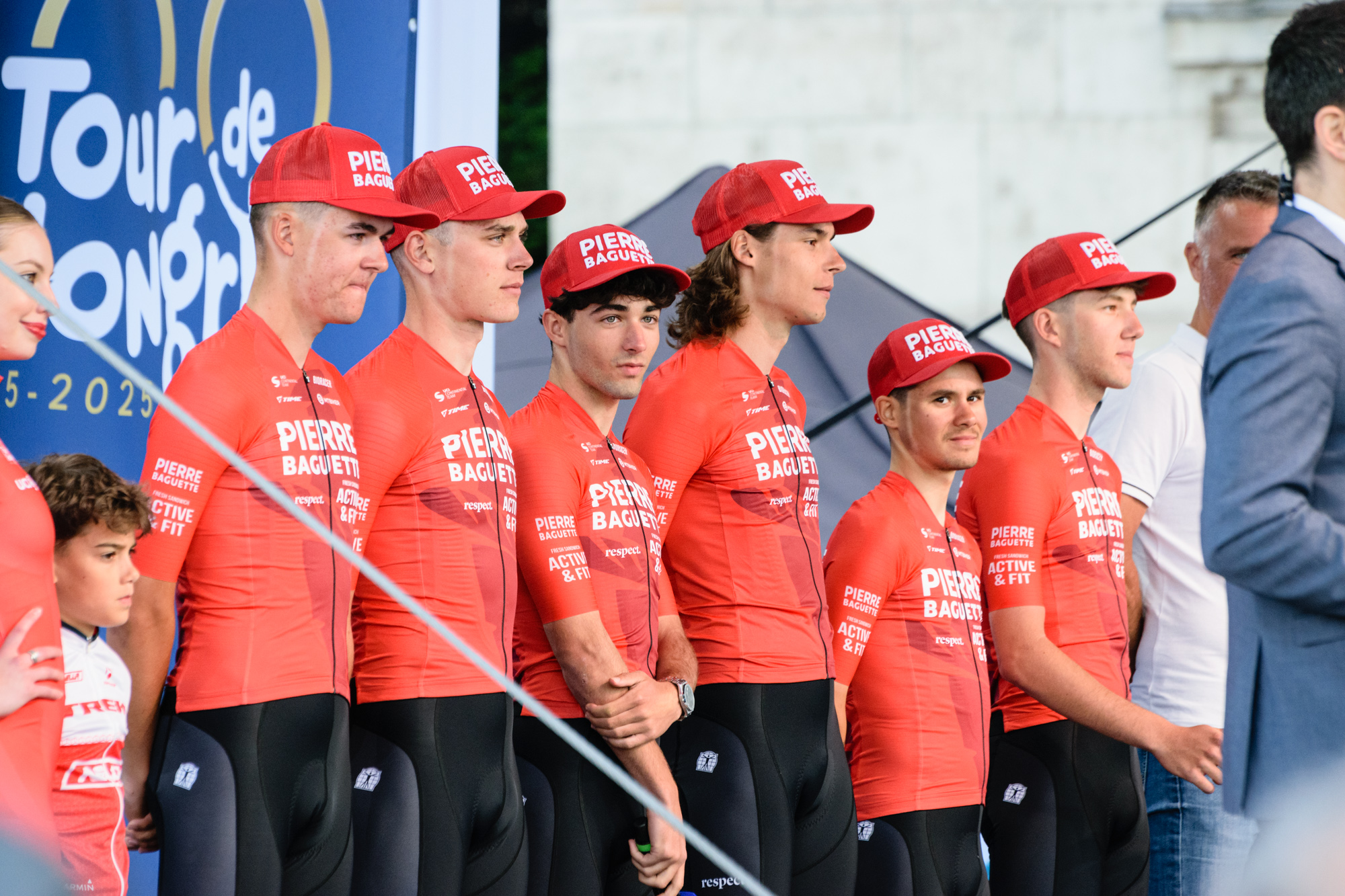
Pierre Baguette Cycling

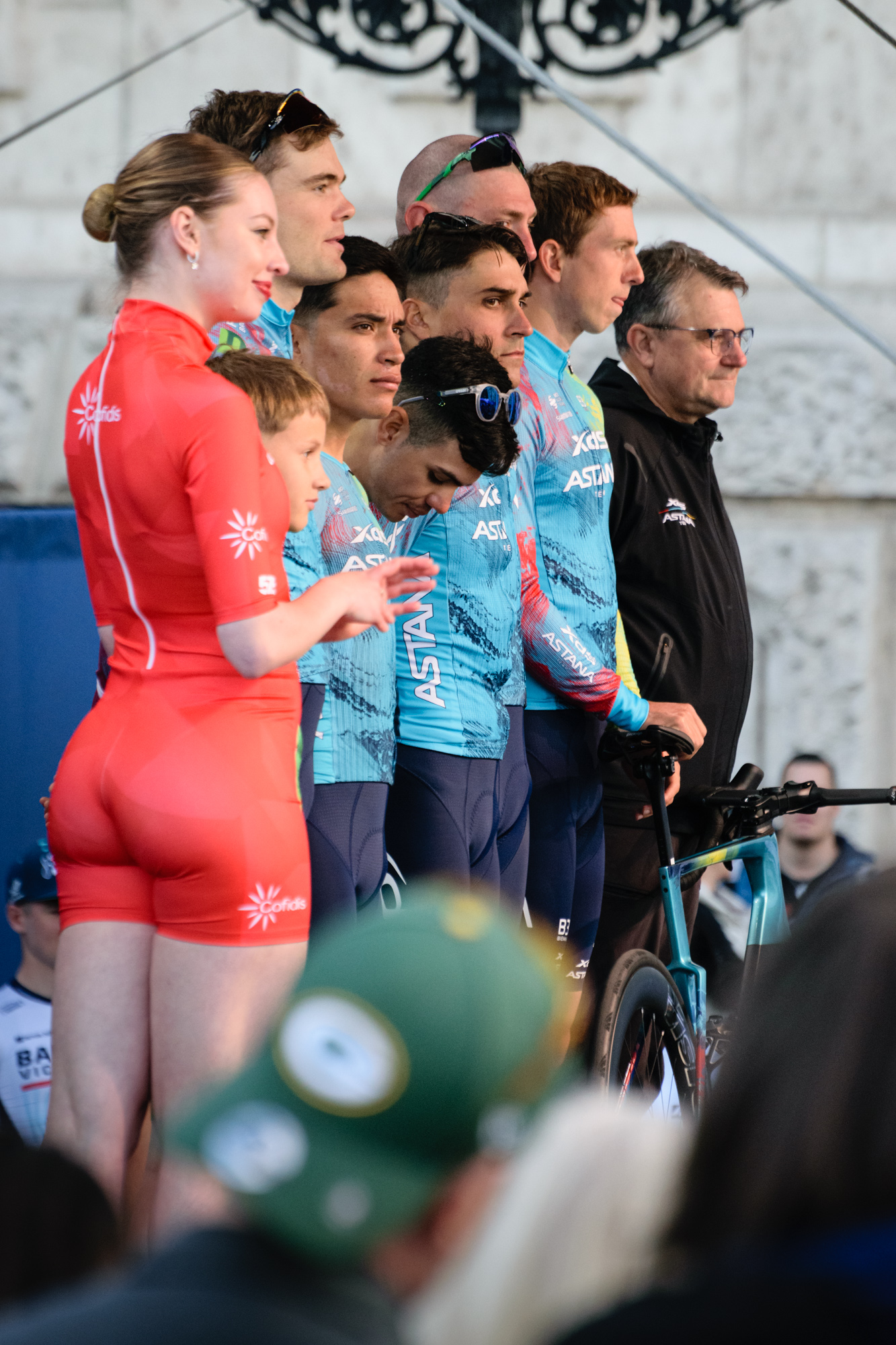
XDS Astana Team

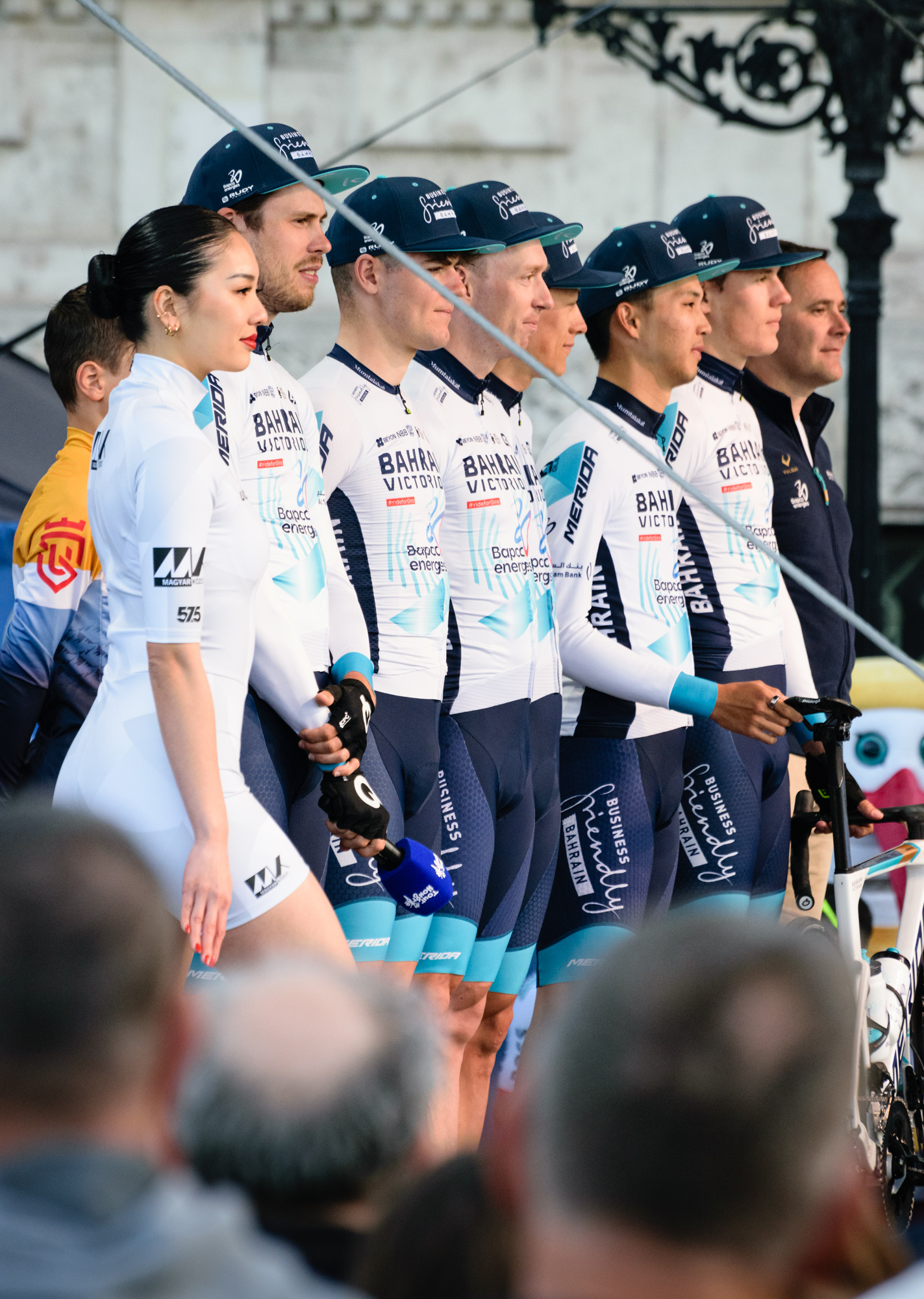
Bahrain Victorious

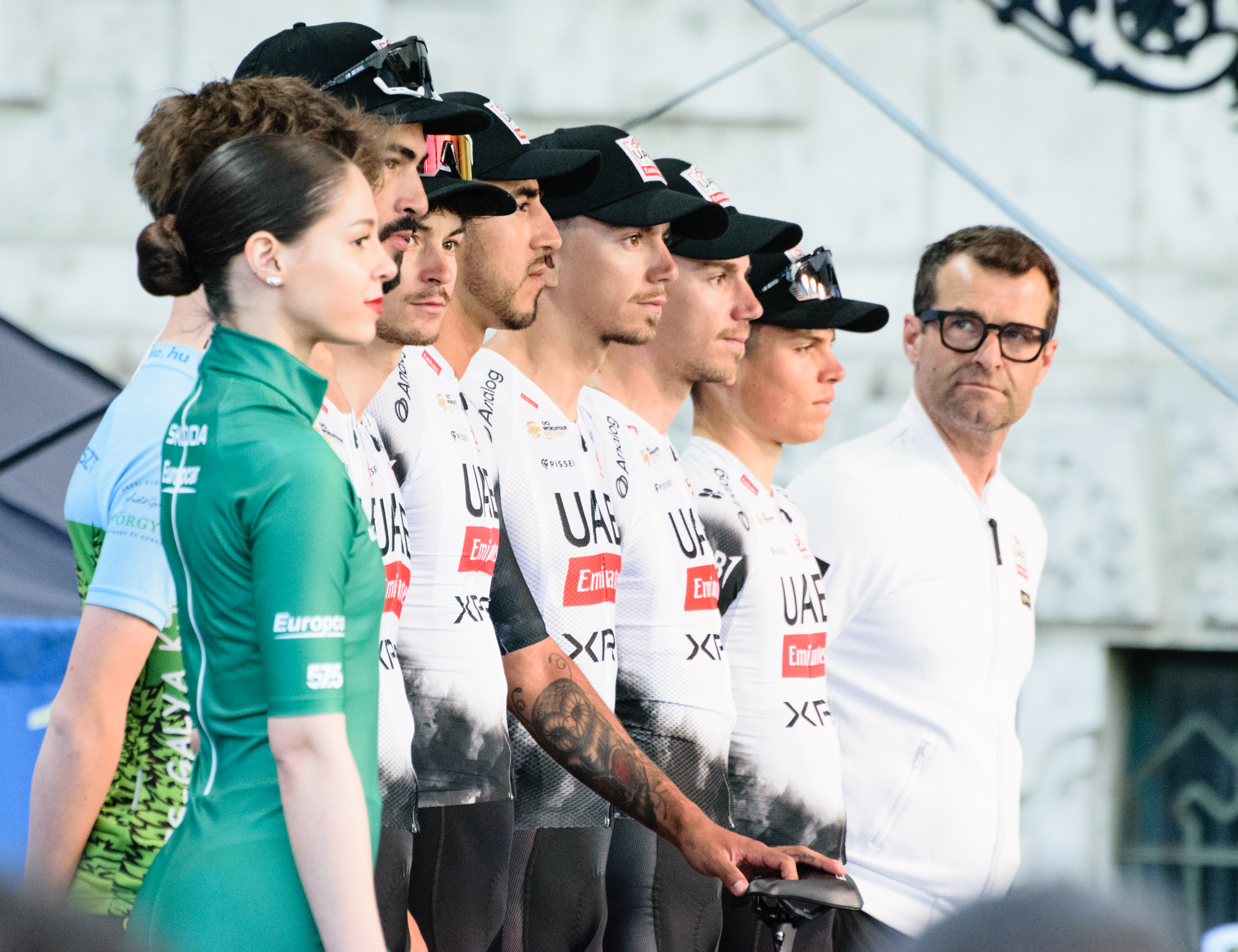
UAE Team Emirates XRG

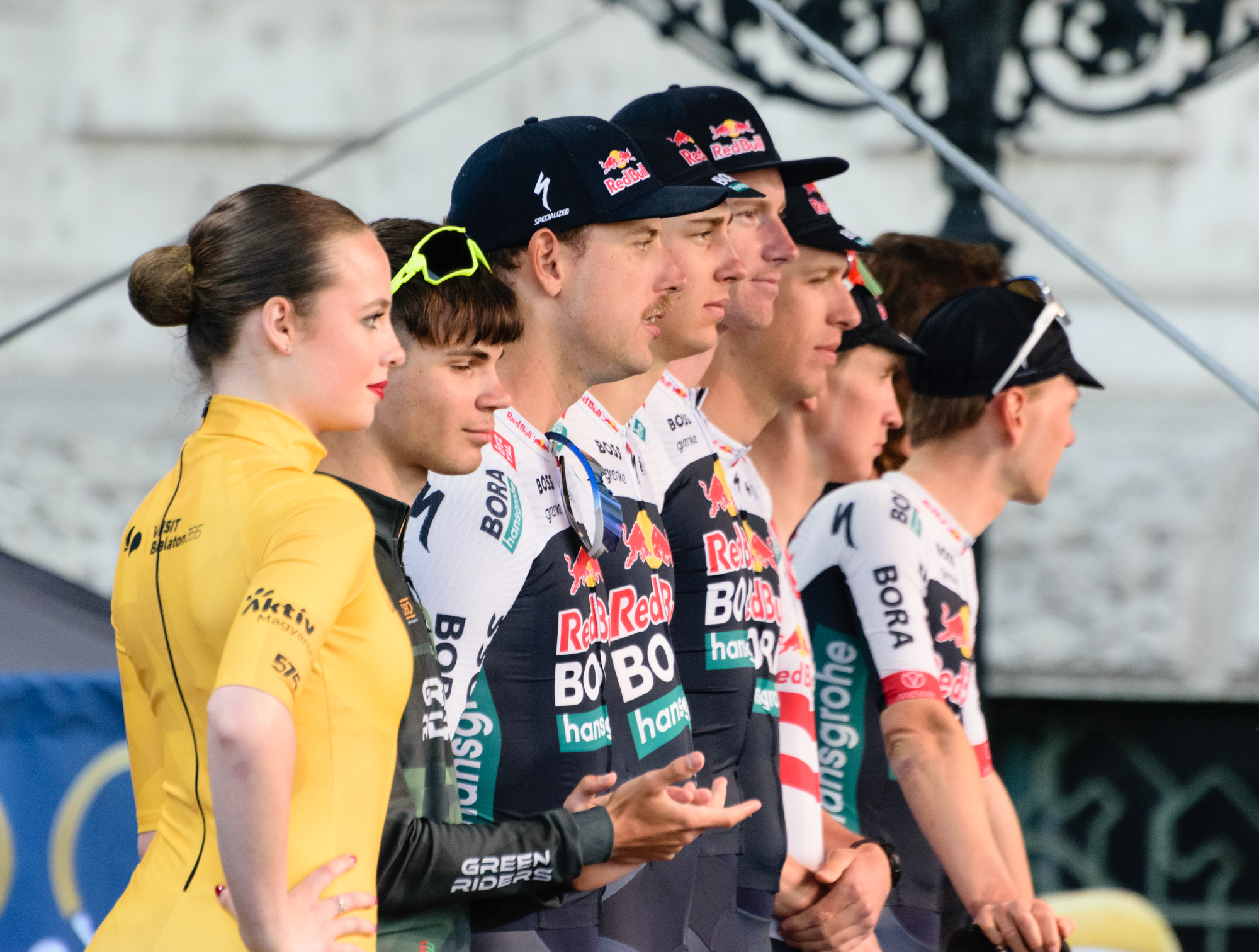
Red Bull–Bora–Hansgrohe

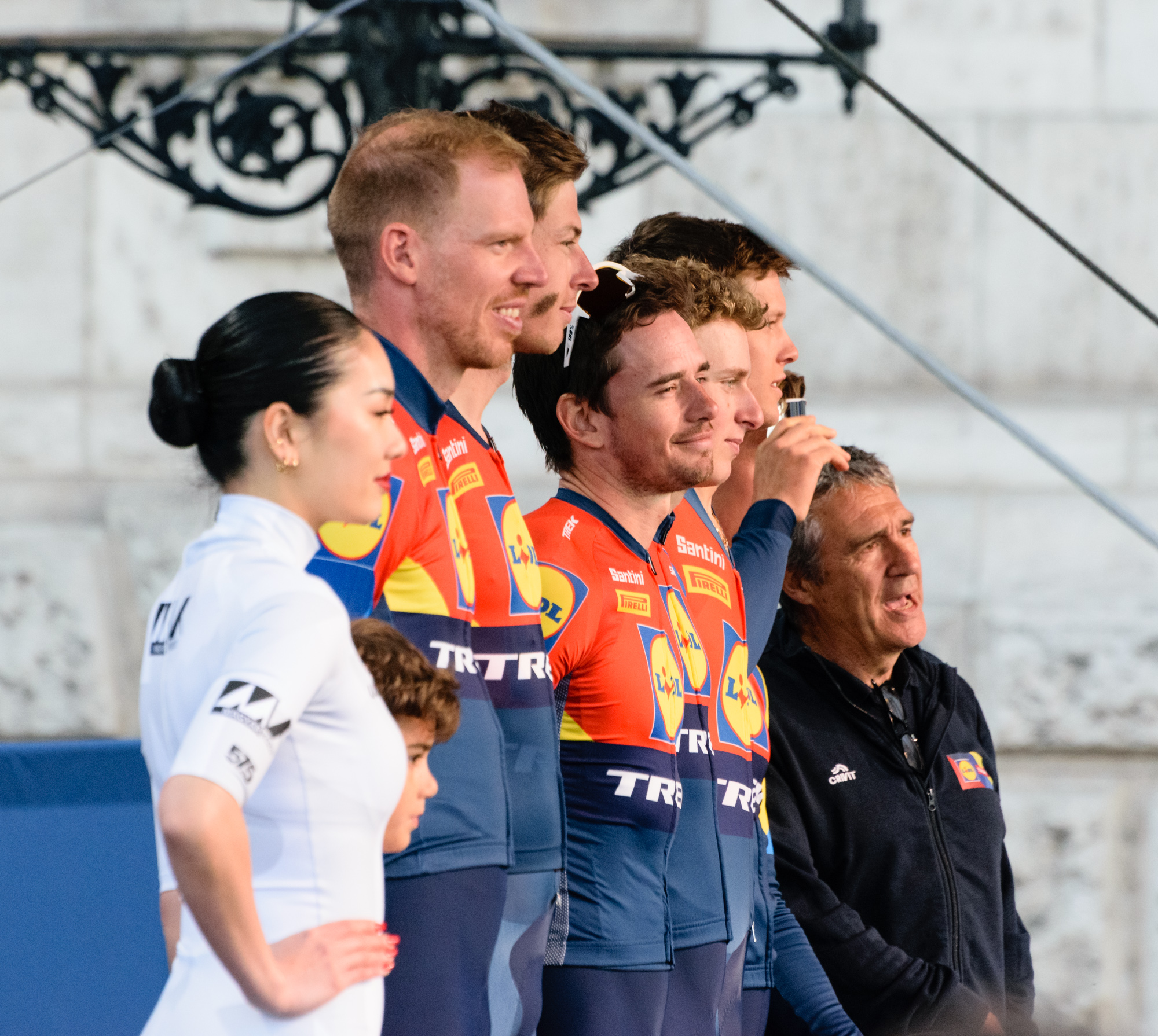
Lidl–Trek

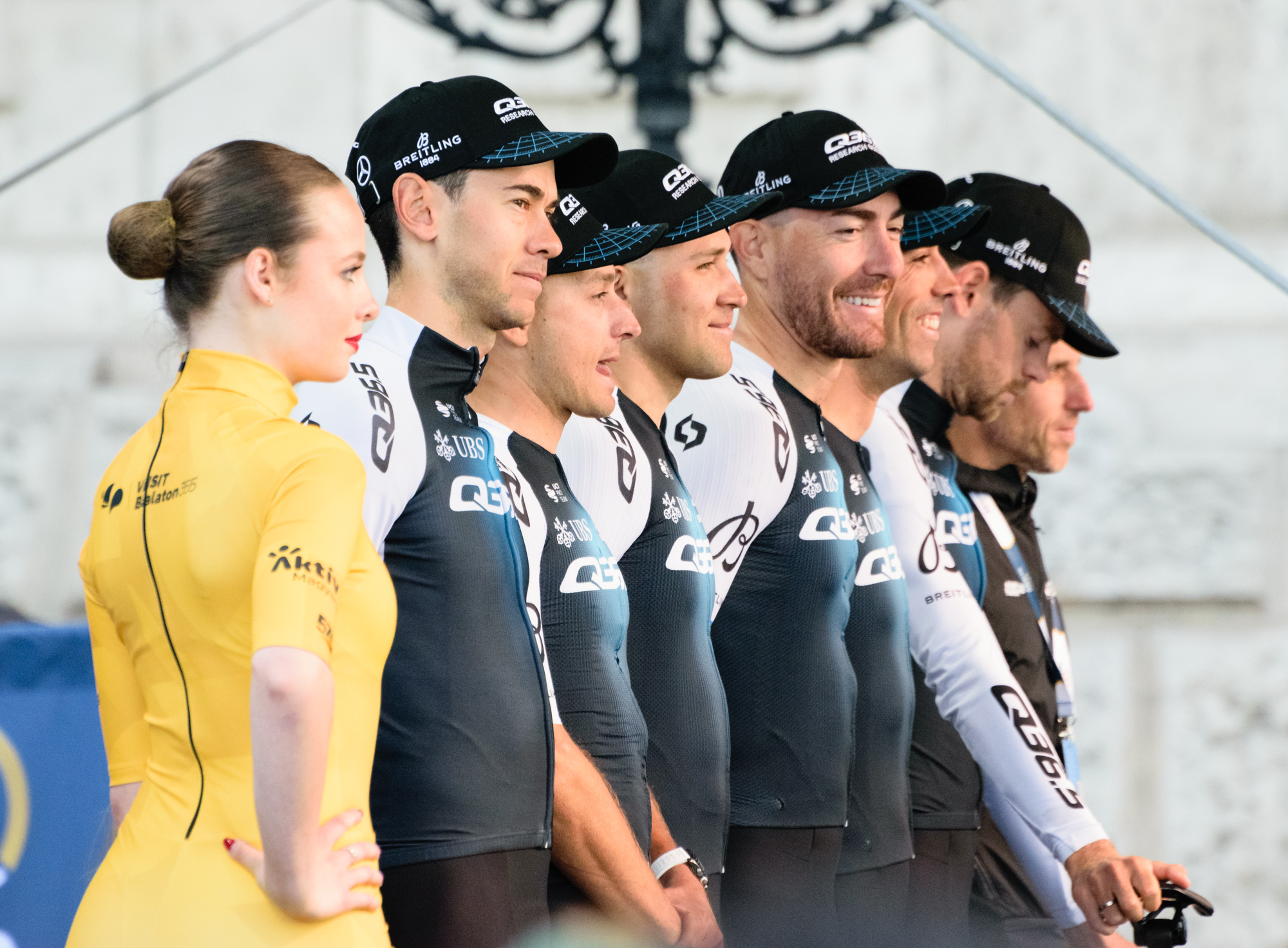
Q36.5 Pro Cycling Team

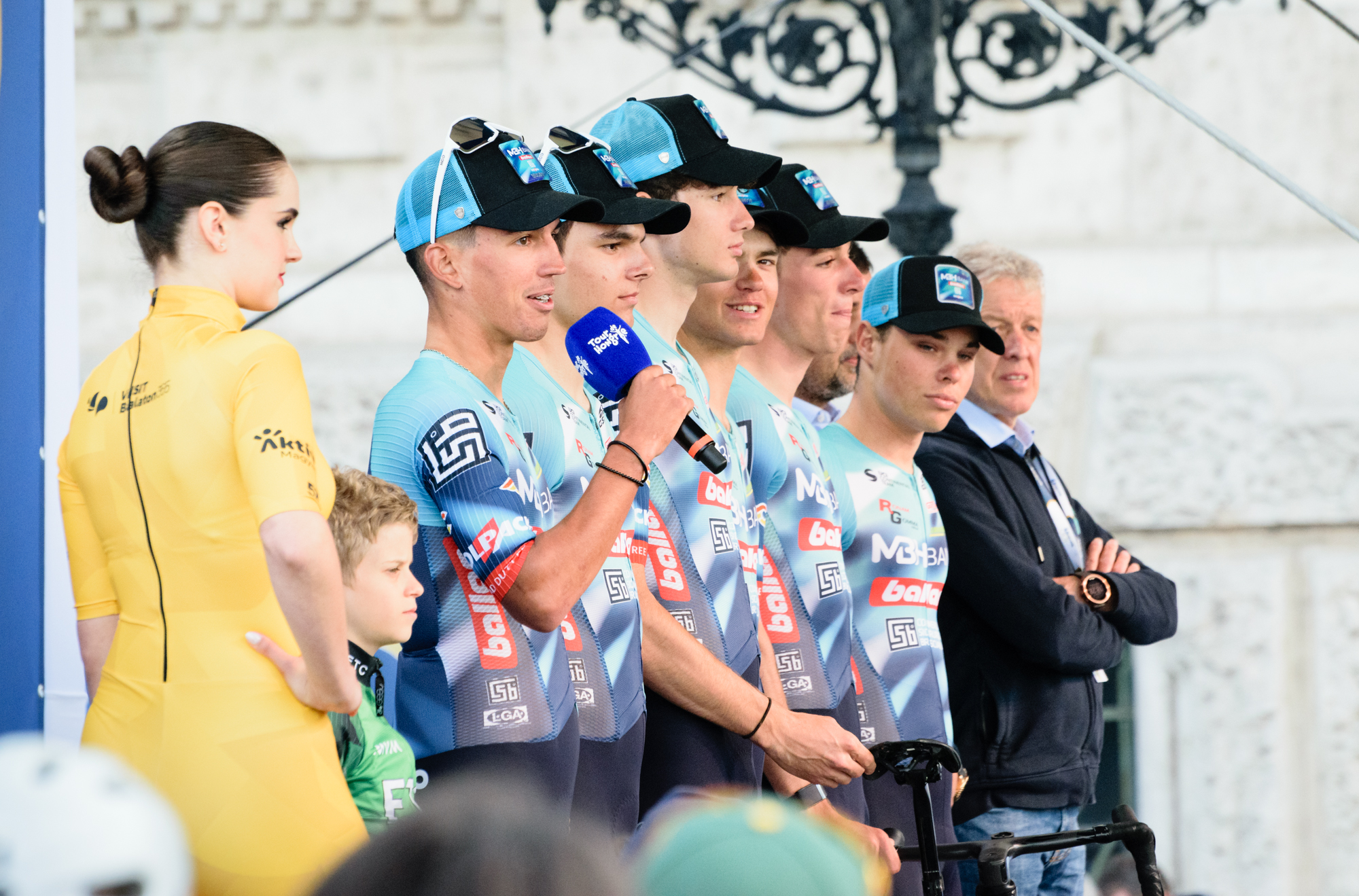
MBH Bank Ballan CSB

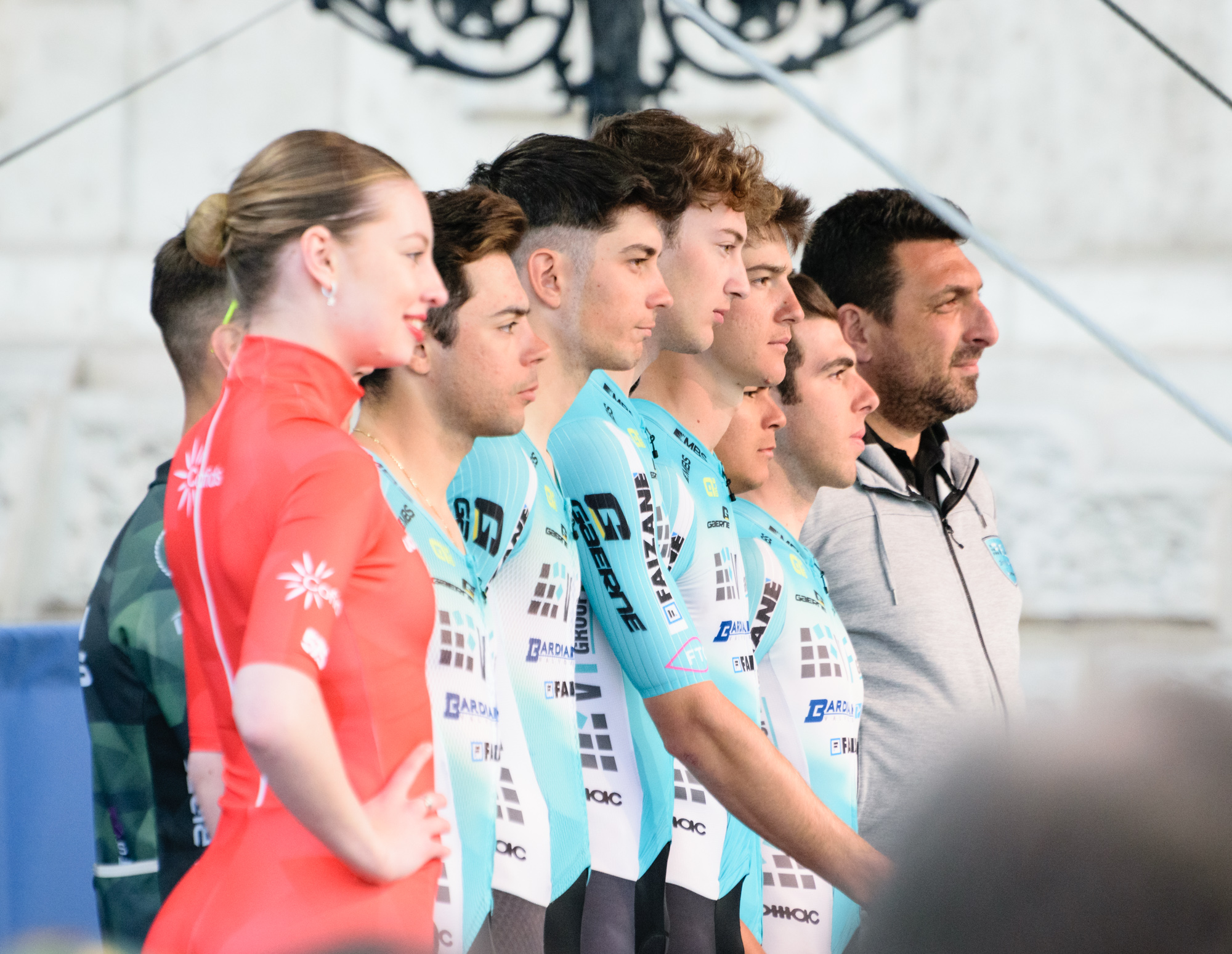
VF Group–Bardiani–CSF–Faizanè

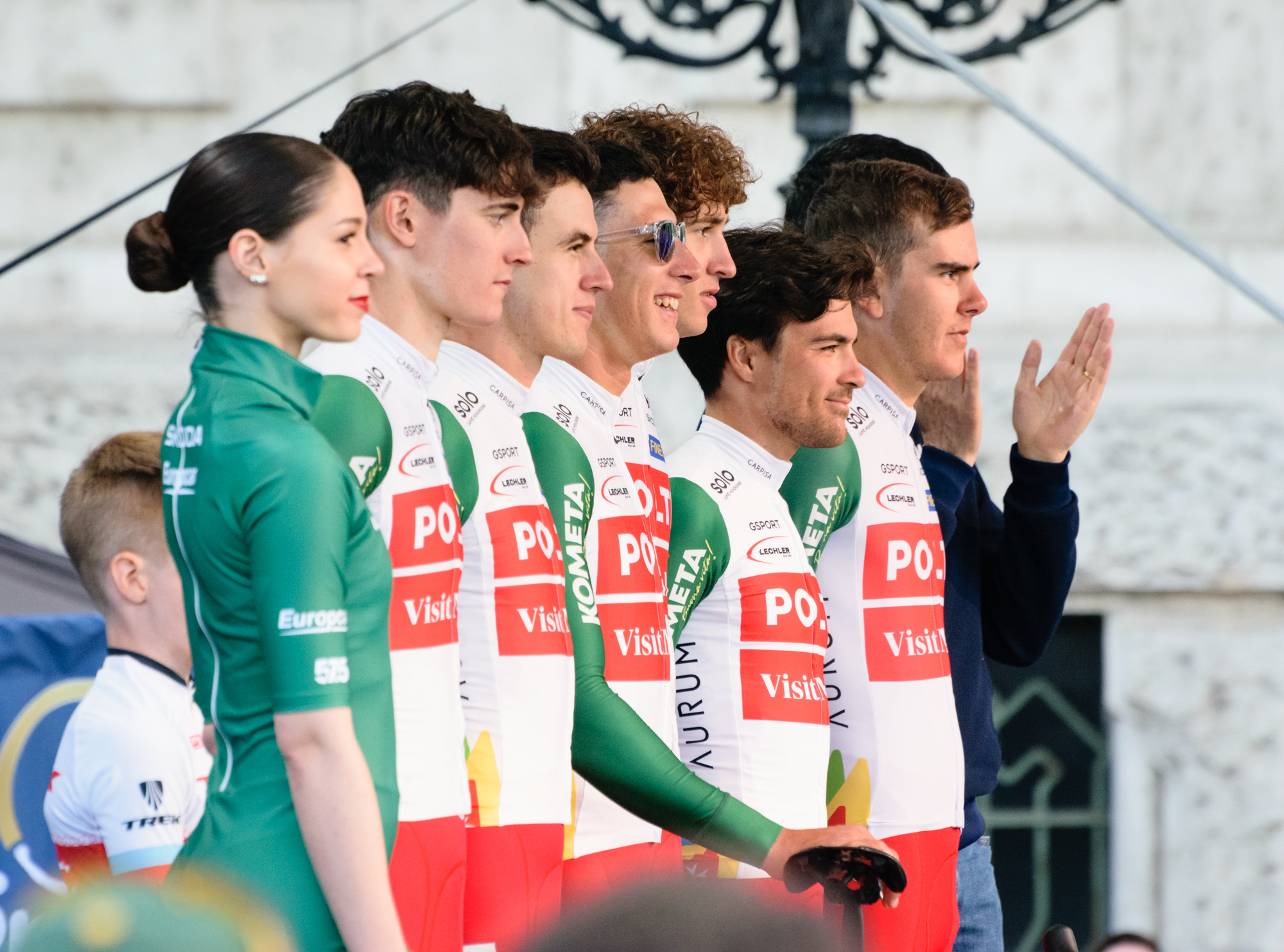
Team Polti VisitMalta

== Route ==
Stage characteristics and winners
Stage	Date	Route	Distance	Elevation gain	Type	Winner
1	14 May	Budapest to Győr	210 km (130 mi)	1,042 m (3,419 ft)	Flat stage	Danny van Poppel (NED)
2	15 May	Veszprém to Siófok	178 km (111 mi)	1,244 m (4,081 ft)	Flat stage	Danny van Poppel (NED)
3	16 May	Gödöllő to Gyöngyös (Kékestető)	163 km (101 mi)	1,974 m (6,476 ft)	Intermediate stage	Harold Martín López (ECU)
4	17 May	Tata to Székesfehérvár	154 km (96 mi)	1,035 m (3,396 ft)	Flat stage	Dylan Groenewegen (NED)
5	18 May	Etyek to Esztergom	170 km (110 mi)	1,960 m (6,430 ft)	Hilly stage	Juan Sebastián Molano (COL)
Total			875 km (544 mi)	7,255 m (23,802 ft)		

== Stages ==
=== Stage 1 ===
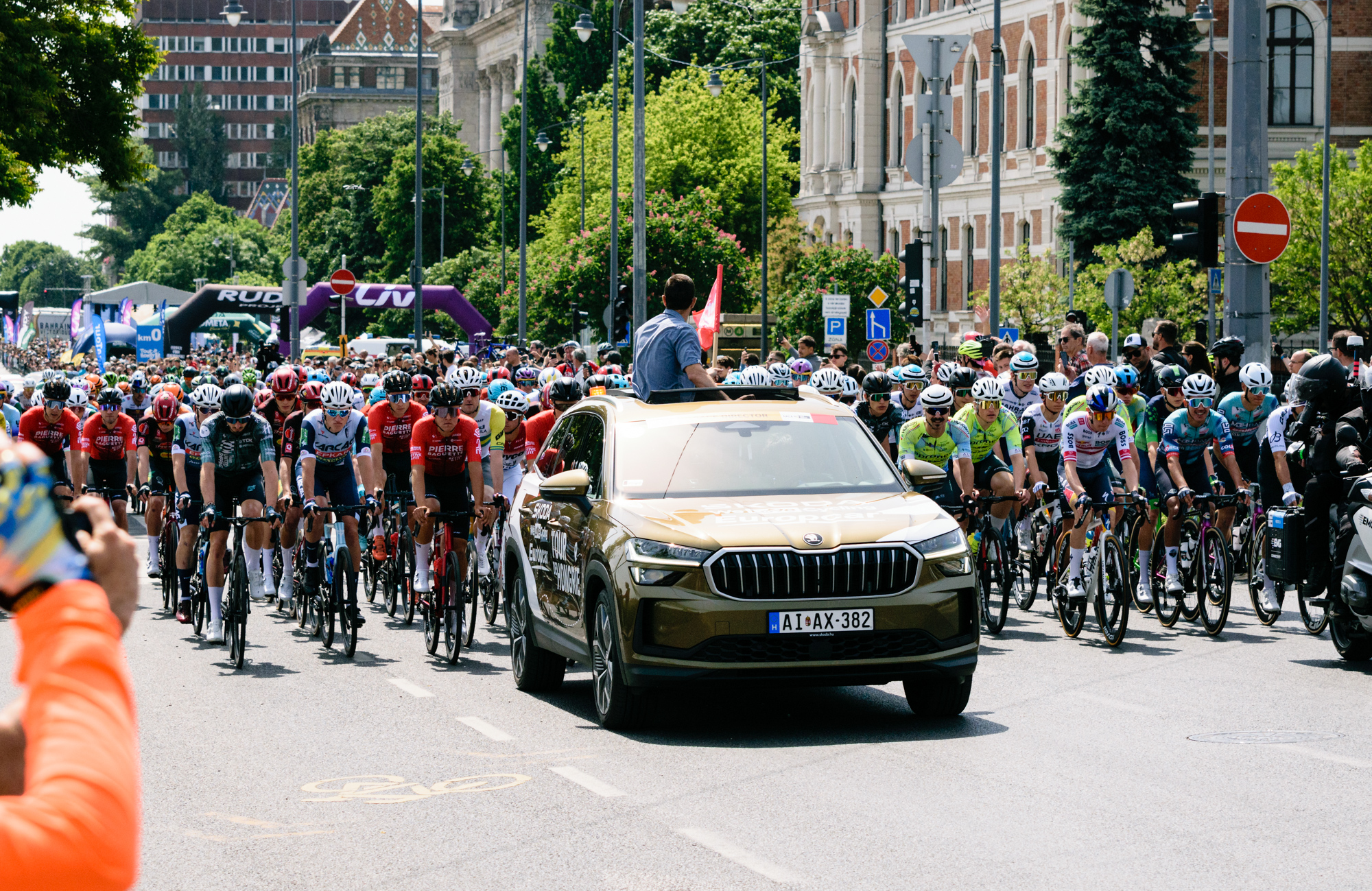
Riders behind the pace car of race director László Szilasi on Stage 1 of the 2025 Tour de Hongrie, Szent Gellért tér, Budapest, Hungary

14 May 2025 — Budapest to Győr, 210 km (130 mi)

Stage 1 Result
Rank	Rider	Team	Time
1	Danny van Poppel (NED)	Red Bull–Bora–Hansgrohe	4h 54' 18"
2	Tim Torn Teutenberg (GER)	Lidl–Trek	+ 0"
3	Dylan Groenewegen (NED)	Team Jayco–AlUla	+ 0"
4	Marc Brustenga (ESP)	Equipo Kern Pharma	+ 0"
5	Matteo Malucelli (ITA)	XDS Astana Team	+ 0"
6	Mihajlo Stolić (SRB)	Team United Shipping	+ 0"
7	Giacomo Nizzolo (ITA)	Q36.5 Pro Cycling Team	+ 0"
8	Phil Bauhaus (GER)	Team Bahrain Victorious	+ 0"
9	Sam Welsford (AUS)	Red Bull–Bora–Hansgrohe	+ 0"
10	Luca Colnaghi (ITA)	VF Group–Bardiani–CSF–Faizanè	+ 0"

General classification after Stage 1
Rank	Rider	Team	Time
1	Danny van Poppel (NED)	Red Bull–Bora–Hansgrohe	4h 54' 08"
2	Tim Torn Teutenberg (GER)	Lidl–Trek	+ 4"
3	János Pelikán (HUN)	Team United Shipping	+ 4"
4	Dylan Groenewegen (NED)	Team Jayco–AlUla	+ 6"
5	Michael Vanthourenhout (BEL)	Pauwels Sauzen–Cibel Clementines	+ 6"
6	Matteo Ambrosini (ITA)	MBH Bank Ballan CSB	+ 9"
7	Siebe Deweirdt (BEL)	Team Flanders–Baloise	+ 9"
8	Marc Brustenga (ESP)	Equipo Kern Pharma	+ 10"
9	Matteo Malucelli (ITA)	XDS Astana Team	+ 10"
10	Mihajlo Stolić (SRB)	Team United Shipping	+ 10"

=== Stage 2 ===
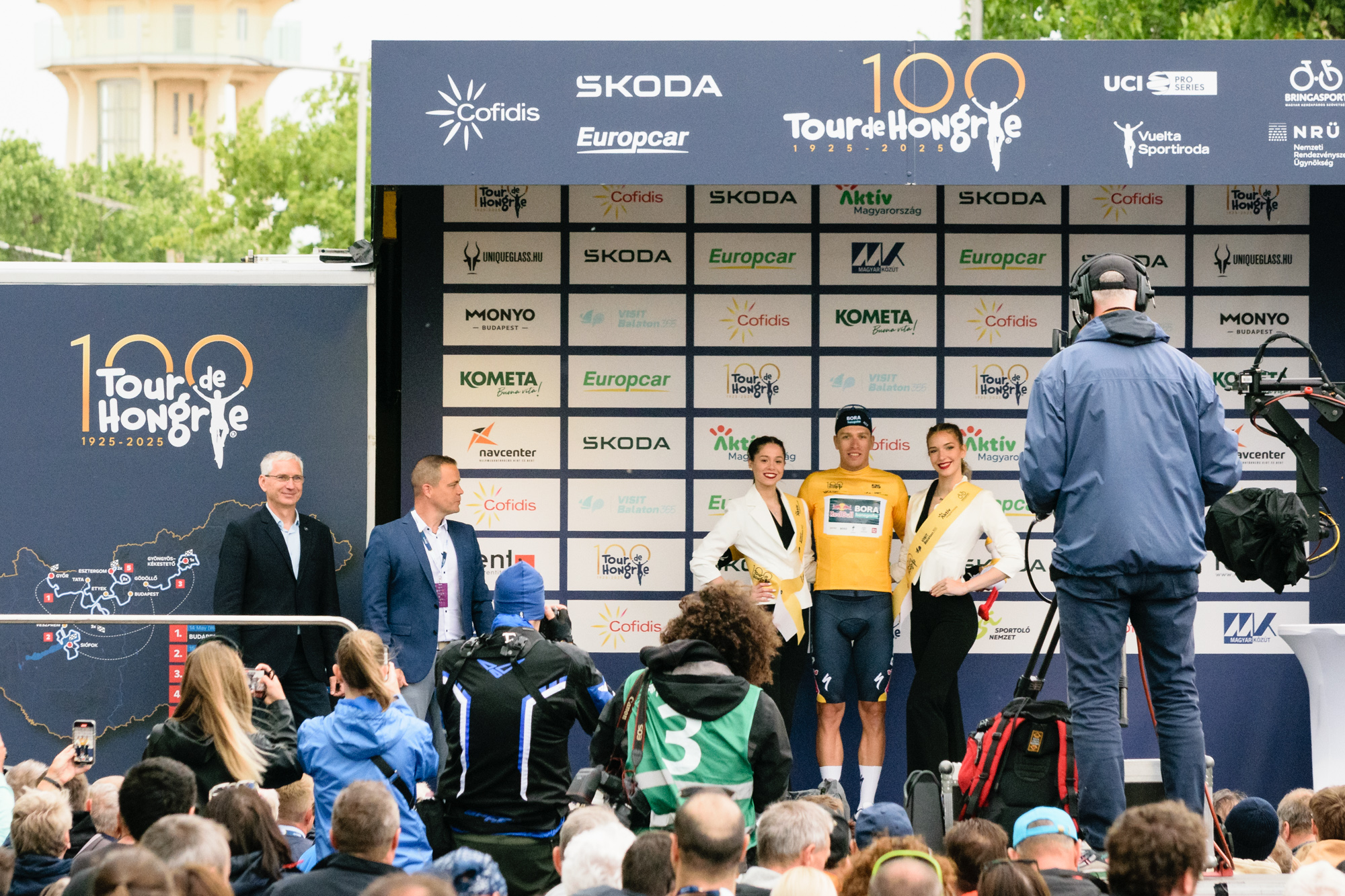
Danny van Poppel receiving the yellow jersey at the podium ceremony after Stage 2

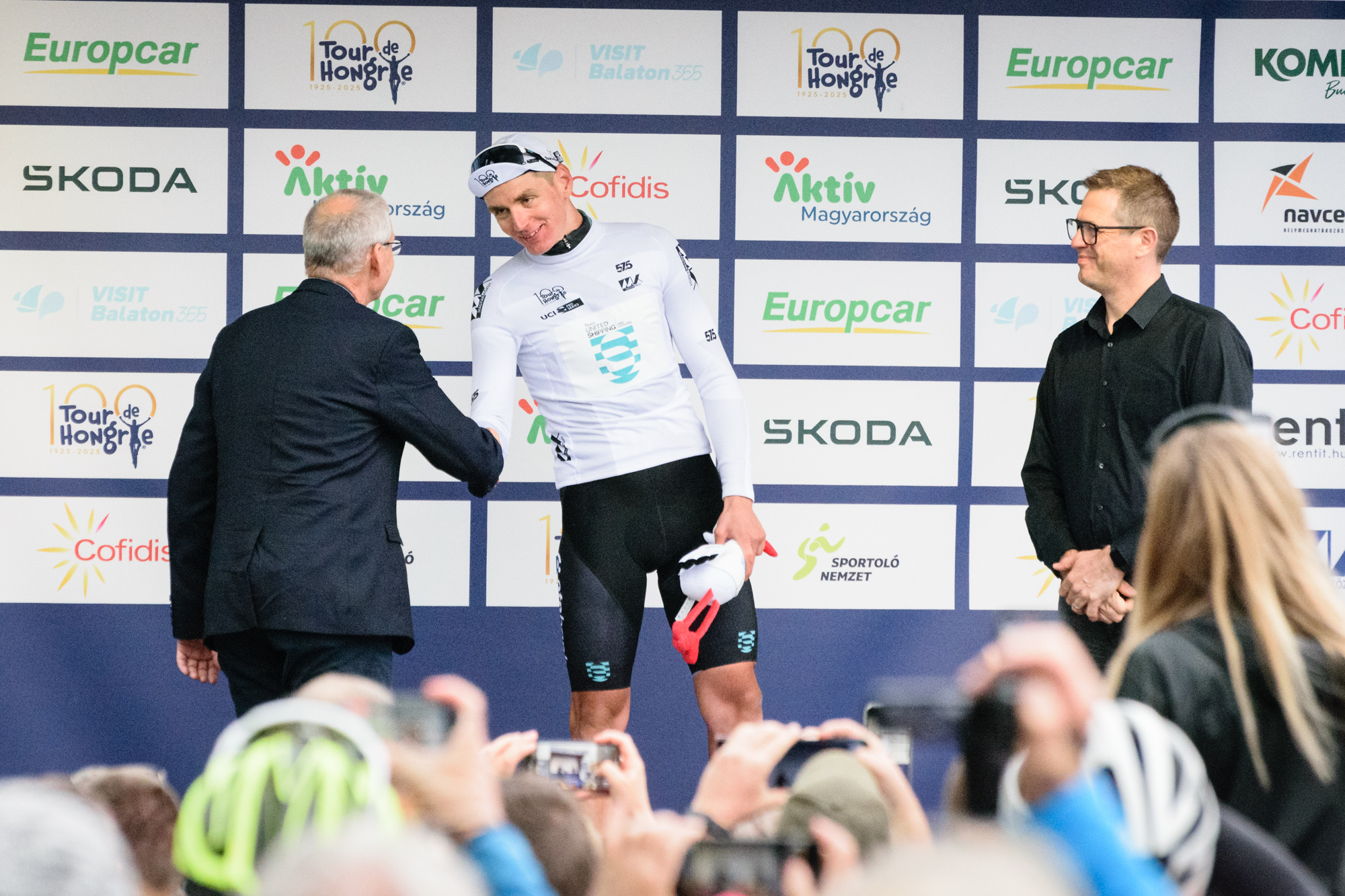
János Pelikán receiving the white jersey for leading the Hungarian leader classification, at the podium ceremony after Stage 2

15 May 2025 — Veszprém to Siófok, 178 km (111 mi)

Stage 2 Result
Rank	Rider	Team	Time
1	Danny van Poppel (NED)	Red Bull–Bora–Hansgrohe	3h 59' 46"
2	Dylan Groenewegen (NED)	Team Jayco–AlUla	+ 0"
3	Tim Torn Teutenberg (GER)	Lidl–Trek	+ 0"
4	Matyáš Kopecký (CZE)	Team Novo Nordisk	+ 0"
5	Juan Sebastián Molano (COL)	UAE Team Emirates XRG	+ 0"
6	Manuel Peñalver (ESP)	Team Polti VisitMalta	+ 0"
7	Marc Brustenga (ESP)	Equipo Kern Pharma	+ 0"
8	Jules Hesters (BEL)	Team Flanders–Baloise	+ 0"
9	Mihajlo Stolić (SRB)	Team United Shipping	+ 0"
10	Matteo Malucelli (ITA)	XDS Astana Team	+ 0"

General classification after Stage 2
Rank	Rider	Team	Time
1	Danny van Poppel (NED)	Red Bull–Bora–Hansgrohe	8h 53' 44"
2	János Pelikán (HUN)	Team United Shipping	+ 8"
3	Dylan Groenewegen (NED)	Team Jayco–AlUla	+ 10"
4	Tim Torn Teutenberg (GER)	Lidl–Trek	+ 10"
5	Michael Vanthourenhout (BEL)	Pauwels Sauzen–Cibel Clementines	+ 16"
6	Luca Cretti (ITA)	MBH Bank Ballan CSB	+ 16"
7	Balázs Rózsa (HUN)	Epronex–Hungary Cycling Team	+ 18"
8	Matteo Ambrosini (ITA)	MBH Bank Ballan CSB	+ 19"
9	Siebe Deweirdt (BEL)	Team Flanders–Baloise	+ 19"
10	Marc Brustenga (ESP)	Equipo Kern Pharma	+ 20"

=== Stage 3 ===
16 May 2025 — Gödöllő to Gyöngyös (Kékestető), 163 km (101 mi)

Stage 3 Result
Rank	Rider	Team	Time
1	Harold Martín López (ECU)	XDS Astana Team	3h 54' 13"
2	Alessandro Covi (ITA)	UAE Team Emirates XRG	+ 7"
3	Albert Withen Philipsen (DEN)	Lidl–Trek	+ 7"
4	Pavel Novák (CZE)	MBH Bank Ballan CSB	+ 7"
5	Jan Castellon (ESP)	Caja Rural–Seguros RGA	+ 7"
6	Alexander Hajek (AUT)	Red Bull–Bora–Hansgrohe	+ 7"
7	Bálint Feldhoffer (HUN)	Team United Shipping	+ 12"
8	Odd Christian Eiking (NOR)	Unibet Tietema Rockets	+ 12"
9	Harm Vanhoucke (BEL)	Q36.5 Pro Cycling Team	+ 15"
10	Alex Tolio (ITA)	VF Group–Bardiani–CSF–Faizanè	+ 15"

General classification after Stage 3
Rank	Rider	Team	Time
1	Harold Martín López (ECU)	XDS Astana Team	12h 48' 07"
2	Alessandro Covi (ITA)	UAE Team Emirates XRG	+ 11"
3	Albert Withen Philipsen (DEN)	Lidl–Trek	+ 13"
4	Alexander Hajek (AUT)	Red Bull–Bora–Hansgrohe	+ 17"
5	Pavel Novák (CZE)	MBH Bank Ballan CSB	+ 17"
6	Jan Castellon (ESP)	Caja Rural–Seguros RGA	+ 17"
7	Bálint Feldhoffer (HUN)	Team United Shipping	+ 22"
8	Odd Christian Eiking (NOR)	Unibet Tietema Rockets	+ 22"
9	Harm Vanhoucke (BEL)	Q36.5 Pro Cycling Team	+ 25"
10	Alex Tolio (ITA)	VF Group–Bardiani–CSF–Faizanè	+ 25"

=== Stage 4 ===
17 May 2025 — Tata to Székesfehérvár, 154 km (96 mi)

Stage 4 Result
Rank	Rider	Team	Time
1	Dylan Groenewegen (NED)	Team Jayco–AlUla	3h 14' 39"
2	Danny van Poppel (NED)	Red Bull–Bora–Hansgrohe	+ 0"
3	Tim Torn Teutenberg (GER)	Lidl–Trek	+ 0"
4	Jules Hesters (BEL)	Team Flanders–Baloise	+ 0"
5	Matteo Malucelli (ITA)	XDS Astana Team	+ 0"
6	Giacomo Nizzolo (ITA)	Q36.5 Pro Cycling Team	+ 0"
7	Marc Brustenga (ESP)	Equipo Kern Pharma	+ 0"
8	Matyáš Kopecký (CZE)	Team Novo Nordisk	+ 0"
9	Mihajlo Stolić (SRB)	Team United Shipping	+ 0"
10	Andoni López de Abetxuko (ESP)	Euskaltel–Euskadi	+ 0"

General classification after Stage 4
Rank	Rider	Team	Time
1	Harold Martín López (ECU)	XDS Astana Team	16h 02' 46"
2	Alessandro Covi (ITA)	UAE Team Emirates XRG	+ 8"
3	Albert Withen Philipsen (DEN)	Lidl–Trek	+ 13"
4	Alexander Hajek (AUT)	Red Bull–Bora–Hansgrohe	+ 16"
5	Jan Castellon (ESP)	Caja Rural–Seguros RGA	+ 17"
6	Pavel Novák (CZE)	MBH Bank Ballan CSB	+ 17"
7	Bálint Feldhoffer (HUN)	Team United Shipping	+ 22"
8	Odd Christian Eiking (NOR)	Unibet Tietema Rockets	+ 22"
9	Harm Vanhoucke (BEL)	Q36.5 Pro Cycling Team	+ 25"
10	Alex Tolio (ITA)	VF Group–Bardiani–CSF–Faizanè	+ 25"

=== Stage 5 ===
18 May 2025 — Etyek to Esztergom, 170 km (110 mi)

Stage 5 Result
Rank	Rider	Team	Time
1	Juan Sebastián Molano (COL)	UAE Team Emirates XRG	3h 54' 02"
2	Danny van Poppel (NED)	Red Bull–Bora–Hansgrohe	+ 0"
3	Tim Torn Teutenberg (GER)	Lidl–Trek	+ 0"
4	Ivo Oliveira (POR)	UAE Team Emirates XRG	+ 0"
5	Matyáš Kopecký (CZE)	Team Novo Nordisk	+ 0"
6	David González (ESP)	Q36.5 Pro Cycling Team	+ 5"
7	Jules Hesters (BEL)	Team Flanders–Baloise	+ 5"
8	Lindsay De Vylder (BEL)	Team Flanders–Baloise	+ 5"
9	Joel Nicolau (ESP)	Caja Rural–Seguros RGA	+ 5"
10	Alessandro Covi (ITA)	UAE Team Emirates XRG	+ 5"

General classification after Stage 5
Rank	Rider	Team	Time
1	Harold Martín López (ECU)	XDS Astana Team	19h 56' 53"
2	Alessandro Covi (ITA)	UAE Team Emirates XRG	+ 7"
3	Albert Withen Philipsen (DEN)	Lidl–Trek	+ 10"
4	Alexander Hajek (AUT)	Red Bull–Bora–Hansgrohe	+ 16"
5	Jan Castellon (ESP)	Caja Rural–Seguros RGA	+ 26"
6	Pavel Novák (CZE)	MBH Bank Ballan CSB	+ 26"
7	Bálint Feldhoffer (HUN)	Team United Shipping	+ 27"
8	Ludovico Crescioli (ITA)	Team Polti VisitMalta	+ 30"
9	Odd Christian Eiking (NOR)	Unibet Tietema Rockets	+ 31"
10	Urko Berrade (ESP)	Equipo Kern Pharma	+ 33"

== Classification leadership table ==
Points for the points classification
Type	1	2	3	4	5	6	7	8	9	10
Stage finishes	20	16	14	12	10	8	6	4	2	1
Intermediate sprint	5	3	1	0						

Points for the mountains classification
Type	1	2	3	4	5	6	7
Points for Category	15	10	8	6	4	2	1
Points for Category	10	6	4	2	1	0	
Points for Category	5	3	1	0			

In the 2025 Tour de Hongrie, four different jerseys were awarded.

The general classification is calculated by adding each cyclist's finishing times on each stage. The leader of the general classification receives a yellow jersey, sponsored by the Hungarian Tourism Agency (VisitBalaton365) and Hungarian Cycling Federation ("Bringasport"). The winner of this classification is considered the winner of the race.

The second classification is the points classification. Riders are awarded points for finishing in the top fifteen of each stage. Points are also on offer at intermediate sprints. The leader of the points classification wears a green jersey, sponsored by Škoda and Europcar.

There is also a mountains classification for which points are awarded for reaching the top of a climb before other riders. The climbs are categorized, in order of increasing difficulty, as first, second, and third-category. The leader of the mountains classification wears a red jersey, sponsored by Cofidis.

The fourth jersey is a classification for Hungarian riders, marked by a white jersey sponsored by the Hungarian Public Road Company (Hungarian: Magyar Közút). Only Hungarian riders are eligible and they are ranked according to their placement in the general classification of the race.

The final classification is the team classification, for which the times of the best three cyclists in each team on each stage are added together; the leading team at the end of the race is the team with the lowest cumulative time.

Classification leadership by stage
Stage	Winner	General classification	Points classification	Mountains classification	Hungarian rider classification	Team classification
1	Danny van Poppel	Danny van Poppel	Danny van Poppel	Siebe Deweirdt	János Pelikán	Lidl–Trek
2	Danny van Poppel	Danny van Poppel	Danny van Poppel	Siebe Deweirdt	János Pelikán	Lidl–Trek
3	Harold Martín López	Harold Martín López	Danny van Poppel	Siebe Deweirdt	Bálint Feldhoffer	Unibet Tietema Rockets
4	Dylan Groenewegen	Harold Martín López	Danny van Poppel	Siebe Deweirdt	Bálint Feldhoffer	Unibet Tietema Rockets
5	Juan Sebastián Molano	Harold Martín López	Danny van Poppel	Siebe Deweirdt	Bálint Feldhoffer	Unibet Tietema Rockets
Final		Harold Martín López	Danny van Poppel	Siebe Deweirdt	Bálint Feldhoffer	Unibet Tietema Rockets

== Classification standings ==
Legend
Denotes the winner of the general classification	Denotes the winner of the points classification
Denotes the winner of the mountains classification	Denotes the winner of the Hungarian rider classification

=== General classification ===
Final general classification (1–10)
Rank	Rider	Team	Time
1	Harold Martín López (ECU)	XDS Astana Team	19h 56' 53"
2	Alessandro Covi (ITA)	UAE Team Emirates XRG	+ 7"
3	Albert Withen Philipsen (DEN)	Lidl–Trek	+ 10"
4	Alexander Hajek (AUT)	Red Bull–Bora–Hansgrohe	+ 16"
5	Jan Castellon (ESP)	Caja Rural–Seguros RGA	+ 26"
6	Pavel Novák (CZE)	MBH Bank Ballan CSB	+ 26"
7	Bálint Feldhoffer (HUN)	Team United Shipping	+ 27"
8	Ludovico Crescioli (ITA)	Team Polti VisitMalta	+ 30"
9	Odd Christian Eiking (NOR)	Unibet Tietema Rockets	+ 31"
10	Urko Berrade (ESP)	Equipo Kern Pharma	+ 33"

=== Points classification ===
Final points classification (1–10)
Rank	Rider	Team	Points
1	Danny van Poppel (NED)	Red Bull–Bora–Hansgrohe	73
2	Tim Torn Teutenberg (GER)	Lidl–Trek	61
3	Dylan Groenewegen (NED)	Team Jayco–AlUla	50
4	Juan Sebastián Molano (COL)	UAE Team Emirates XRG	30
5	Matyáš Kopecký (CZE)	Team Novo Nordisk	26
6	Marc Brustenga (ESP)	Equipo Kern Pharma	24
7	Alessandro Covi (ITA)	UAE Team Emirates XRG	23
8	Jules Hesters (BEL)	Team Flanders–Baloise	22
9	Harold Martín López (ECU)	XDS Astana Team	20
10	János Pelikán (HUN)	Team United Shipping	20

=== Mountains classification ===
Final mountains classification (1–10)
Rank	Rider	Team	Points
1	Siebe Deweirdt (BEL)	Team Flanders–Baloise	25
2	Harold Martín López (ECU)	XDS Astana Team	15
3	Owen Geleijn (NED)	Unibet Tietema Rockets	13
4	Zétény Szijártó (HUN)	Team United Shipping	12
5	Gabriele Raccagni (ITA)	Team Polti VisitMalta	10
6	Alessandro Covi (ITA)	UAE Team Emirates XRG	10
7	Albert Withen Philipsen (DEN)	Lidl–Trek	8
8	Balázs Rózsa (HUN)	Epronex–Hungary Cycling Team	7
9	Michal Schuran (CZE)	Team United Shipping	7
10	Pavel Novák (CZE)	MBH Bank Ballan CSB	6

=== Hungarian rider classification ===
Final Hungarian rider classification (1–10)
Rank	Rider	Team	Time
1	Bálint Feldhoffer (HUN)	Team United Shipping	19h 57' 20"
2	Márton Dina (HUN)	Euskaltel–Euskadi	+ 44"
3	Márk Valent (HUN)	MBH Bank Ballan CSB	+ 1' 34"
4	János Pelikán (HUN)	Team United Shipping	+ 3' 35"
5	Zsombor Tamás Takács (HUN)	MBH Bank Ballan CSB	+ 3' 37"
6	Erik Fetter (HUN)	Team United Shipping	+ 4' 20"
7	Balázs Rózsa (HUN)	Epronex–Hungary Cycling Team	+ 5' 17"
8	Zétény Szijártó (HUN)	Team United Shipping	+ 6' 19"
9	Viktor Filutás (HUN)	Karcag Cycling ÉPKAR Team	+ 12' 39"
10	Zsolt Istlstekker (HUN)	Epronex–Hungary Cycling Team	+ 17' 40"

=== Team classification ===
Final team classification (1–10)
Rank	Team	Time
1	(France) Unibet Tietema Rockets	59h 52' 45"
2	(Spain) Caja Rural–Seguros RGA	+ 20"
3	(Switzerland) Q36.5 Pro Cycling Team	+ 26"
4	(Italy) Team Polti VisitMalta	+ 29"
5	(Spain) Euskaltel–Euskadi	+ 45"
6	(Spain) Equipo Kern Pharma	+ 45"
7	(Italy) MBH Bank Ballan CSB	+ 56"
8	(Belgium) Pauwels Sauzen–Cibel Clementines	+ 2' 44"
9	(United States) Lidl–Trek	+ 5' 08"
10	(Hungary) Team United Shipping	+ 5' 52"

== See also ==
- 2025 in men's road cycling
- 2025 in sports
