= Mathys Rondel =

French cyclist

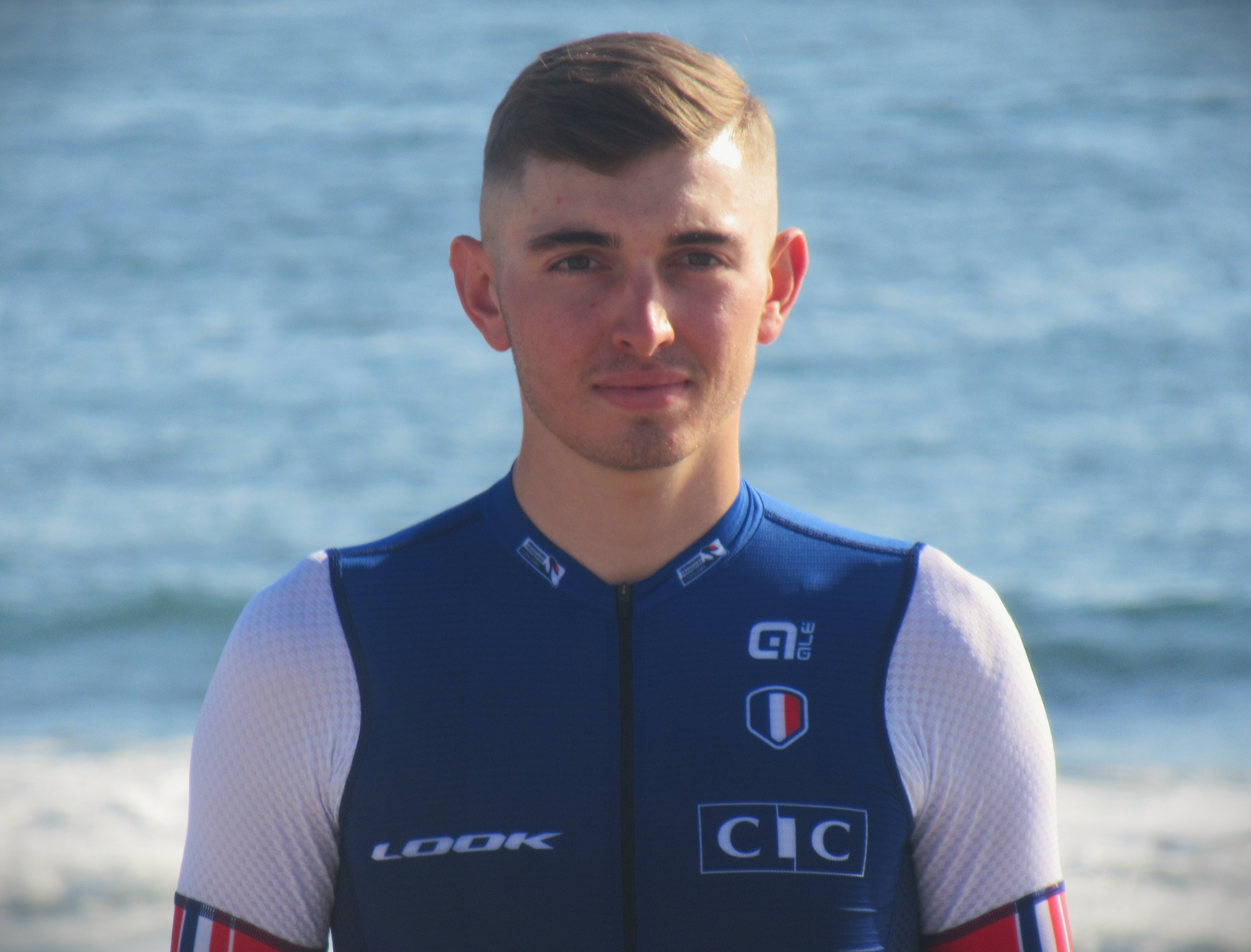
- Rondel in 2023

Personal information
- Born: 23 September 2003 (age 23) Le Mans, France
- Height: 1.80 m (5 ft 11 in)

Cycling career
- Sport: Cycling
- Current team: Tudor Pro Cycling Team
- Discipline: Road
- Role: Rider
- Rider type: Climber

Amateur teams
- 2020–2021: UC Montgesnoise
- 2022: VC Pays de Loudéac

Professional teams
- 2023–2024: Tudor Pro Cycling Team U23 (Note: Until 19 July)
- 2024–: Tudor Pro Cycling Team (Note: Joined on 20 July)

Mathys Rondel (born 23 September 2003) is a French professional racing cyclist, who currently rides for UCI ProTeam Tudor Pro Cycling Team. He finished 11th at the 2026 Giro d'Italia.

== Major results ==
2022
7th Overall Ronde de l'Isard

1st Points classification

2023
2nd Overall Tour Alsace

1st Young rider classification

5th Ruota d'Oro
6th Overall Tour de l'Avenir
7th Piccolo Giro di Lombardia
8th Orlen Nations Grand Prix
2024
1st Overall Orlen Nations Grand Prix

1st Stage 2

4th Overall Giro Next Gen
2025
2nd Trofeo Tessile & Moda
4th Overall Tour de Luxembourg
4th Overall Giro d'Abruzzo
4th Japan Cup
9th Overall Tour de Romandie
2026
2nd Overall Giro d'Abruzzo
2nd Trofeo Andratx–Pollença
4th Trofeo Serra Tramuntana
5th Overall Tour of the Alps
6th Overall Vuelta a Burgos
8th Overall Paris–Nice
8th GP Industria & Artigianato di Larciano
9th Memorial Marco Pantani
10th Giro di Lombardia

=== Grand Tour general classification results timeline ===
Grand Tour	2026
Giro d'Italia	11
Tour de France	—
Vuelta a España	—
