= Ludovico Crescioli =

Italian cyclist

Personal information
- Born: 20 October 2003 (age 22) Empoli, Italy
- Height: 1.78 m (5 ft 10 in)
- Weight: 63 kg (139 lb)

Cycling career
- Sport: Cycling
- Current team: Team Polti VisitMalta
- Discipline: Road
- Role: Rider
- Rider type: Climber

Amateur teams
- 2020–2021: UC Casano
- 2022–2023: Mastromarco Sensi Nibali

Professional teams
- 2024: Team Technipes #inEmiliaRomagna
- 2025–: Team Polti VisitMalta

Ludovico Crescioli (born 20 October 2003) is an Italian cyclist, who currently rides for UCI ProTeam Team Polti VisitMalta. He took his first professional win in April 2026 in a three-man sprint at the Giro dell'Appennino.

== Major results ==
2021
2nd Overall Giro della Lunigiana
4th Trofeo Buffoni
7th Trofeo Guido Dorigo
2024
1st Stage 2 Tour de l'Avenir
3rd Overall Giro della Valle d'Aosta
3rd Trofeo Città di San Vendemiano
3rd Giro del Belvedere
4th Overall Ronde de l'Isard
4th Ruota d'Oro
2025
8th Overall Tour de Hongrie
8th Clàssica Camp de Morvedre
9th Overall Tour of Magnificent Qinghai
2026 (1 pro win)
1st Giro dell'Appennino
2nd Trofeo Matteotti
4th Tour du Jura Cycliste
5th Circuito de Getxo
7th Overall Giro d'Abruzzo
8th Coppa Sabatini
8th Tre Valli Varesine
9th Giro del Veneto
9th Region on Dodecanese GP

=== Grand Tour general classification results timeline ===
Grand Tour	2026
Giro d'Italia	27
Tour de France	—
Vuelta a España	—

Legend
—	Did not compete
DNF	Did not finish
