= Mario Zanchi =

Italian cyclist (1939–1976)

Personal information
- Born: 8 May 1939 Castiglion Fibocchi, Tuscany, Kingdom of Italy
- Died: 20 April 1976 (aged 36) Montevarchi, Tuscany, Italy

Cycling career
- Sport: Cycling
- Role: Rider

Mario Zanchi (8 May 1939 – 20 April 1976) was an Italian racing cyclist. He rode in the 1962 Tour de France.
