= Giro d'Abruzzo =

Professional cycling race held annually in Italy

- 2026 Giro d'Abruzzo

Race details
- Date: April–May
- Region: Abruzzo
- Discipline: Road race
- Competition: UCI Europe Tour
- Type: Stage race

History
- First edition: 1961
- Editions: 37 (as of 2026)
- First winner: Mario Zanchi (ITA)
- Most wins: (2) Aleksandr Kuschynski (BLR)
- Most recent: Kévin Vauquelin (FRA)

The Giro d'Abruzzo is a professional cycling race held annually in Italy. It was part of UCI Europe Tour in category 2.2 in 2007, and returned in 2024 as a 2.1 rated event.

The race returned in 2024 under RCS Sport, in collaboration with the Abruzzo Region, replacing the Giro di Sicilia.

== Winners ==
Year	Winner	Second	Third
1961	(Italy) Mario Zanchi		
1962	(Italy) Primo Nardello		
1963	(Italy) Fabrizio Carloni		
1964	(Italy) Giancarlo Massari		
1965	(Italy) Francesco Polidori		
1966	(Italy) Luigi Sgarbozza		
1967	(Italy) Antonio Fradusco		
1968	No race		
1969	(Italy) Angelo Bassini		
1970	(Italy) Paolo Battistacci		
1971	(Italy) Luciano Mencuccini		
1972	(Italy) Palmiro Masciarelli		
1973–78	No race		
1979	(Italy) Giovanni Bino		
1980	(Switzerland) Fausto Stiz		
1981	(Italy) Maurizio Viotto		
1982	(Soviet Union) Sergey Voronin		
1983	(France) Philippe Le Peurien		
1984	(Italy) Tullio Cortinovis		
1985	(Italy) Enrico Galleschi		
1986	(Italy) Luigi Botteon		
1987	(Italy) Angelo Gelfi		
1988	(Italy) Moreno Picchio		
1989–92	No race		
1993	(Italy) Maurizio Frizzo		
1994	(Italy) Filippo Casagrande		
1995	(Italy) Pasquale Braido		
1996	(Italy) Andrea Zatti	(Italy) Oscar Pozzi	(Italy) Isidoro Colombo
1997	(Italy) Fabio Balzi	(Italy) Cristian Moreni	(Italy) Maurizio Vandelli
1998	(Italy) Francesco Secchiari	(Italy) Stefano Faustini	(Italy) Isidoro Colombo
1999	(Italy) Cristian Gasperoni	(Italy) Danilo Di Luca	(Italy) Giorgio Feliziani
2000	(Italy) Daniele De Paoli	(Ukraine) Vladimir Douma	(Italy) Giuseppe Palumbo
2001	(Italy) Danilo Di Luca	(Socialist Federal Republic of Yugoslavia) Saša Gajičić	(Italy) Roberto Petito
2002	(Belarus) Aleksandr Kuschynski	(Italy) Alessio Ciro	(Italy) Luigi Bonfrate
2003	(Italy) Oscar Mason	(Italy) Denis Lunghi	(Italy) Michele Scarponi
2004	(Belarus) Aleksandr Kuschynski	(Slovenia) Valter Bonca	(Italy) Domenico Quagliarello
2005–06	No race		
2007	(Italy) Luca Ascani	(Italy) Ivan Fanelli	(Italy) Davide Tortella
2008–23	No race		
2024	(Kazakhstan) Alexey Lutsenko	(France) Pavel Sivakov	(New Zealand) George Bennett
2025	(Germany) Georg Zimmermann	(Spain) David de la Cruz	(Spain) Pablo Torres
2026	(France) Kévin Vauquelin	(France) Mathys Rondel	(Italy) Nicola Conci
