= List of teams and cyclists in the 2022 Vuelta a España =

List of cyclists

The following is a list of teams and cyclists who took part in the 2022 Vuelta a España.

== Teams ==
UCI WorldTeams

- AG2R Citroën Team
- Astana Qazaqstan Team
- Bora–Hansgrohe
- Cofidis
- EF Education–EasyPost
- Groupama–FDJ
- INEOS Grenadiers
- Intermarché–Wanty–Gobert Matériaux
- Israel–Premier Tech
- Lotto–Soudal
- Movistar Team
- Quick-Step Alpha Vinyl Team
- Team Bahrain Victorious
- Team BikeExchange–Jayco
- Team DSM
- Team Jumbo–Visma
- Trek–Segafredo
- UAE Team Emirates

UCI ProTeams

- Alpecin–Deceuninck
- Arkéa–Samsic
- Burgos BH
- Equipo Kern Pharma
- Euskaltel–Euskadi

== Cyclists ==
Legend
No.	Starting number worn by the rider during the Vuelta
Pos.	Position in the general classification
Time	Deficit to the winner of the general classification
†	Denotes riders born on or after 1 January 1997, and thus eligible for the young rider classification
	Denotes the winner of the general classification
	Denotes the winner of the points classification
	Denotes the winner of the mountains classification
	Denotes the winner of the young rider classification
	Denotes the winner of the team classification
	Denotes the winner of the combativity award
DNS	Denotes a rider who did not start, followed by the stage before which he withdrew
DNF	Denotes a rider who did not finish, followed by the stage in which he withdrew
DSQ	Denotes a rider who was disqualified from the race, followed by the stage in which this occurred
OTL	Denotes a rider who finished outside the time limit, followed by the stage in which he did so
COV	Denotes a rider who withdrew because of COVID-19 either because he tested positive or team members tested positive, followed by the stage before which he withdrew
Ages correct as of Friday 19 August 2022, the date on which the Vuelta began

=== By starting number ===
No.	Name	Nationality	Team	Age	Pos.	Time	Ref.
1	Primož Roglič	Slovenia	Team Jumbo–Visma	32	DNS-17	–	
2	Edoardo Affini	Italy	Team Jumbo–Visma	26	DNS-10	–	
3	Rohan Dennis	Australia	Team Jumbo–Visma	32	52	+ 2h 30' 38"	
4	Robert Gesink	Netherlands	Team Jumbo–Visma	36	41	+ 1h 47' 49"	
5	Chris Harper	Australia	Team Jumbo–Visma	27	33	+ 1h 25' 40"	
6	Sepp Kuss	United States	Team Jumbo–Visma	27	DNS-9	–	
7	Sam Oomen	Netherlands	Team Jumbo–Visma	27	30	+ 1h 22' 43"	
8	Mike Teunissen	Netherlands	Team Jumbo–Visma	29	91	+ 3h 52' 29"	
11	Ben O'Connor	Australia	AG2R Citroën Team	26	8	+ 10' 30"	
12	Clément Champoussin †	France	AG2R Citroën Team	24	32	+ 1h 24' 39"	
13	Jaakko Hänninen †	Finland	AG2R Citroën Team	25	COV-7	–	
14	Bob Jungels	Luxembourg	AG2R Citroën Team	29	51	+ 2h 30' 17"	
15	Nans Peters	France	AG2R Citroën Team	28	61	+ 2h 43' 45"	
16	Nicolas Prodhomme †	France	AG2R Citroën Team	25	73	+ 3h 16' 03"	
17	Antoine Raugel †	France	AG2R Citroën Team	23	115	+ 4h 41' 39"	
18	Andrea Vendrame	Italy	AG2R Citroën Team	28	COV-7	–	
21	Miguel Ángel López	Colombia	Astana Qazaqstan Team	28	4	+ 5' 56"	
22	Samuele Battistella †	Italy	Astana Qazaqstan Team	23	DNS-18	–	
23	David de la Cruz	Spain	Astana Qazaqstan Team	33	21	+ 1h 00' 15"	
24	Yevgeniy Fedorov †	Kazakhstan	Astana Qazaqstan Team	22	123	+ 4h 54' 32"	
25	Alexey Lutsenko	Kazakhstan	Astana Qazaqstan Team	29	71	+ 3h 14' 22"	
26	Vincenzo Nibali	Italy	Astana Qazaqstan Team	37	45	+ 2h 05' 45"	
27	Vadim Pronskiy †	Kazakhstan	Astana Qazaqstan Team	24	38	+ 1h 35' 03"	
28	Harold Tejada †	Colombia	Astana Qazaqstan Team	25	65	+ 3h 01' 54"	
31	Mikel Landa	Spain	Team Bahrain Victorious	32	15	+ 44' 13"	
32	Santiago Buitrago †	Colombia	Team Bahrain Victorious	22	COV-12	–	
33	Gino Mäder †	Switzerland	Team Bahrain Victorious	25	20	+ 52' 25"	
34	Wout Poels	Netherlands	Team Bahrain Victorious	23	COV-9	–	
35	Luis León Sánchez	Spain	Team Bahrain Victorious	38	16	+ 45' 49"	
36	Jasha Sütterlin	Germany	Team Bahrain Victorious	29	85	+ 3h 44' 28"	
37	Fred Wright †	Great Britain	Team Bahrain Victorious	23	67	+ 3h 07' 51"	
38	Edoardo Zambanini †	Italy	Team Bahrain Victorious	21	36	+ 1h 31' 40"	
41	Sam Bennett	Ireland	Bora–Hansgrohe	31	COV-10	–	
42	Matteo Fabbro	Italy	Bora–Hansgrohe	27	54	+ 2h 32' 05"	
43	Sergio Higuita †	Colombia	Bora–Hansgrohe	25	23	+ 1h 01' 23"	
44	Jai Hindley	Australia	Bora–Hansgrohe	26	10	+ 12' 01"	
45	Wilco Kelderman	Netherlands	Bora–Hansgrohe	31	18	+ 48' 37"	
46	Jonas Koch	Germany	Bora–Hansgrohe	29	99	+ 4h 08' 48"	
47	Ryan Mullen	Ireland	Bora–Hansgrohe	28	128	+ 5h 13' 47"	
48	Danny van Poppel	Netherlands	Bora–Hansgrohe	29	121	+ 4h 51' 49"	
51	Jesús Herrada	Spain	Cofidis	32	56	+ 2h 35' 06"	
52	Bryan Coquard	France	Cofidis	30	DNS-17	–	
53	Davide Cimolai	Italy	Cofidis	33	134	+ 5h 31' 26"	
54	Thomas Champion †	France	Cofidis	22	98	+ 4h 07' 57"	
55	Rubén Fernández	Spain	Cofidis	31	59	+ 2h 39' 15"	
56	José Herrada	Spain	Cofidis	36	COV-10	–	
57	Rémy Rochas	France	Cofidis	26	DNF-7	–	
58	Davide Villella	Italy	Cofidis	31	53	+ 2h 31' 31"	
61	Rigoberto Urán	Colombia	EF Education–EasyPost	35	9	+ 11' 04"	
62	Jonathan Kléver Caicedo	Ecuador	EF Education–EasyPost	29	69	+ 3h 10' 33"	
63	Hugh Carthy	Great Britain	EF Education–EasyPost	28	25	+ 1h 04' 31"	
64	Esteban Chaves	Colombia	EF Education–EasyPost	32	DNS-16	–	
65	Merhawi Kudus	Eritrea	EF Education–EasyPost	28	79	+ 3h 30' 00"	
66	Mark Padun	Ukraine	EF Education–EasyPost	26	46	+ 2h 14' 34"	
67	James Shaw	Great Britain	EF Education–EasyPost	26	87	+ 3h 48' 57"	
68	Julius van den Berg	Netherlands	EF Education–EasyPost	25	130	+ 5h 15' 43"	
71	Thibaut Pinot	France	Groupama–FDJ	32	17	+ 46' 20"	
72	Bruno Armirail	France	Groupama–FDJ	28	DNS-18	–	
73	Fabian Lienhard	Switzerland	Groupama–FDJ	28	122	+ 4h 53' 56"	
74	Rudy Molard	France	Groupama–FDJ	32	31	+ 1h 23' 20"	
75	Quentin Pacher	France	Groupama–FDJ	30	DNF-18	–	
76	Sébastien Reichenbach	Switzerland	Groupama–FDJ	33	24	+ 1h 01' 39"	
77	Miles Scotson	Australia	Groupama–FDJ	28	109	+ 4h 27' 35"	
78	Jake Stewart †	Great Britain	Groupama–FDJ	22	DNS-8	–	
81	Richard Carapaz	Ecuador	INEOS Grenadiers	29	14	+ 29' 19"	
82	Dylan van Baarle	Netherlands	INEOS Grenadiers	30	49	+ 2h 18' 25"	
83	Tao Geoghegan Hart	Great Britain	INEOS Grenadiers	27	19	+ 49' 11"	
84	Ethan Hayter †	Great Britain	INEOS Grenadiers	23	COV-10	–	
85	Luke Plapp †	Australia	INEOS Grenadiers	21	95	+ 4h 00' 04"	
86	Carlos Rodríguez †	Spain	INEOS Grenadiers	21	7	+ 7' 57"	
87	Pavel Sivakov †	France	INEOS Grenadiers	25	COV-11	–	
88	Ben Turner †	Great Britain	INEOS Grenadiers	23	72	+ 3h 15' 34"	
91	Jan Bakelants	Belgium	Intermarché–Wanty–Gobert Matériaux	36	29	+ 1h 21' 33"	
92	Jan Hirt	Czechia	Intermarché–Wanty–Gobert Matériaux	31	COV-6	–	
93	Julius Johansen †	Denmark	Intermarché–Wanty–Gobert Matériaux	22	129	+ 5h 14' 17"	
94	Louis Meintjes	South Africa	Intermarché–Wanty–Gobert Matériaux	30	11	+ 15' 41"	
95	Domenico Pozzovivo	Italy	Intermarché–Wanty–Gobert Matériaux	39	DNS-15	–	
96	Rein Taaramäe	Estonia	Intermarché–Wanty–Gobert Matériaux	35	DNS-17	–	
97	Gerben Thijssen †	Belgium	Intermarché–Wanty–Gobert Matériaux	24	DNF-9	–	
98	Boy van Poppel	Netherlands	Intermarché–Wanty–Gobert Matériaux	34	COV-12	–	
101	Michael Woods	Canada	Israel–Premier Tech	35	DNF-3	–	
102	Patrick Bevin	New Zealand	Israel–Premier Tech	31	75	+ 3h 20' 37"	
103	Alessandro De Marchi	Italy	Israel–Premier Tech	36	103	+ 4h 16' 06"	
104	Itamar Einhorn †	Israel	Israel–Premier Tech	24	DNF-8	–	
105	Chris Froome	Great Britain	Israel–Premier Tech	37	114	+ 4h 39' 31"	
106	Omer Goldstein	Israel	Israel–Premier Tech	25	63	+ 2h 51' 38"	
107	Carl Fredrik Hagen	Norway	Israel–Premier Tech	30	34	+ 1h 26' 35"	
108	Daryl Impey	South Africa	Israel–Premier Tech	37	101	+ 4h 10' 52"	
111	Thomas De Gendt	Belgium	Lotto–Soudal	35	80	+ 3h 33' 27"	
112	Cedric Beullens †	Belgium	Lotto–Soudal	25	108	+ 4h 25' 23"	
113	Filippo Conca †	Italy	Lotto–Soudal	23	COV-17	–	
114	Steff Cras	Belgium	Lotto–Soudal	26	DNF-2	–	
115	Jarrad Drizners †	Australia	Lotto–Soudal	23	COV-10	–	
116	Kamil Małecki	Poland	Lotto–Soudal	26	125	+ 5h 00' 05"	
117	Harry Sweeny †	Australia	Lotto–Soudal	24	COV-10	–	
118	Maxim Van Gils †	Belgium	Lotto–Soudal	22	COV-16	–	
121	Alejandro Valverde	Spain	Movistar Team	42	13	+ 25' 39"	
122	Mathias Norsgaard †	Denmark	Movistar Team	25	COV-10	–	
123	Lluís Mas	Spain	Movistar Team	32	133	+ 5h 27' 42"	
124	Enric Mas	Spain	Movistar Team	27	2	+ 2' 02"	
125	Gregor Mühlberger	Austria	Movistar Team	28	50	+ 2h 25' 08"	
126	Nelson Oliveira	Portugal	Movistar Team	33	37	+ 1h 31' 42"	
127	José Joaquín Rojas	Spain	Movistar Team	37	48	+ 2h 17' 50"	
128	Carlos Verona	Spain	Movistar Team	29	35	+ 1h 28' 33"	
131	Julian Alaphilippe	France	Quick-Step Alpha Vinyl Team	30	DNF-11	–	
132	Rémi Cavagna	France	Quick-Step Alpha Vinyl Team	27	104	+ 4h 16' 33"	
133	Dries Devenyns	Belgium	Quick-Step Alpha Vinyl Team	39	100	+ 4h 09' 15"	
134	Remco Evenepoel †	Belgium	Quick-Step Alpha Vinyl Team	22	1	80h 26' 59"	
135	Fausto Masnada	Italy	Quick-Step Alpha Vinyl Team	28	57	+ 2h 38' 11"	
136	Pieter Serry	Belgium	Quick-Step Alpha Vinyl Team	33	COV-9	–	
137	Ilan Van Wilder †	Belgium	Quick-Step Alpha Vinyl Team	22	40	+ 1h 45' 24"	
138	Louis Vervaeke	Belgium	Quick-Step Alpha Vinyl Team	28	58	+ 2h 38' 29"	
141	Simon Yates	Great Britain	Team BikeExchange–Jayco	30	COV-11	–	
142	Lawson Craddock	United States	Team BikeExchange–Jayco	30	55	+ 2h 32' 14"	
143	Luke Durbridge	Australia	Team BikeExchange–Jayco	31	112	+ 4h 35' 38"	
144	Kaden Groves †	Australia	Team BikeExchange–Jayco	23	113	+ 4h 38' 00"	
145	Lucas Hamilton	Australia	Team BikeExchange–Jayco	26	78	+ 3h 28' 54"	
146	Michael Hepburn	Australia	Team BikeExchange–Jayco	31	118	+ 4h 48' 17"	
147	Kelland O'Brien †	Australia	Team BikeExchange–Jayco	24	DNF-14	–	
148	Callum Scotson	Australia	Team BikeExchange–Jayco	26	DNS-12	–	
151	Thymen Arensman †	Netherlands	Team DSM	22	6	+ 7' 45"	
152	Nikias Arndt	Germany	Team DSM	30	COV-8	–	
153	Marco Brenner †	Germany	Team DSM	19	74	+ 3h 19' 54"	
154	John Degenkolb	Germany	Team DSM	33	124	+ 4h 56' 40"	
155	Mark Donovan †	Great Britain	Team DSM	23	COV-8	–	
156	Jonas Iversby Hvideberg †	Norway	Team DSM	23	110	+ 4h 33' 12"	
157	Joris Nieuwenhuis	Netherlands	Team DSM	26	106	+ 4h 19' 29"	
158	Henri Vandenabeele †	Belgium	Team DSM	22	DNF-9	–	
161	Julien Bernard	France	Trek–Segafredo	30	88	+ 3h 51' 02"	
162	Dario Cataldo	Italy	Trek–Segafredo	37	117	+ 4h 48' 07"	
163	Kenny Elissonde	France	Trek–Segafredo	31	64	+ 3h 00' 24"	
164	Daan Hoole †	Netherlands	Trek–Segafredo	23	COV-5	–	
165	Alex Kirsch	Luxembourg	Trek–Segafredo	30	119	+ 4h 50' 17"	
166	Juan Pedro López †	Spain	Trek–Segafredo	25	97	+ 4h 03' 39"	
167	Mads Pedersen	Denmark	Trek–Segafredo	26	102	+ 4h 14' 48"	
168	Antonio Tiberi †	Italy	Trek–Segafredo	21	92	+ 3h 52' 58"	
171	Marc Soler	Spain	UAE Team Emirates	28	27	+ 1h 17' 08"	
172	Pascal Ackermann	Germany	UAE Team Emirates	28	111	+ 4h 33' 23"	
173	Ivo Oliveira	Portugal	UAE Team Emirates	25	131	+ 5h 19' 55"	
174	Juan Ayuso †	Spain	UAE Team Emirates	19	3	+ 4' 57"	
175	João Almeida †	Portugal	UAE Team Emirates	24	5	+ 7' 24"	
176	Brandon McNulty †	United States	UAE Team Emirates	24	70	+ 3h 13' 18"	
177	Juan Sebastián Molano	Colombia	UAE Team Emirates	27	126	+ 5h 09' 31"	
178	Jan Polanc	Slovenia	UAE Team Emirates	30	12	+ 21' 39"	
181	Tim Merlier	Belgium	Alpecin–Deceuninck	29	132	+ 5h 21' 23"	
182	Floris De Tier	Belgium	Alpecin–Deceuninck	30	DNS-10	–	
183	Jimmy Janssens	Belgium	Alpecin–Deceuninck	33	107	+ 4h 23' 20"	
184	Xandro Meurisse	Belgium	Alpecin–Deceuninck	30	39	+ 1h 42' 47"	
185	Robert Stannard †	Australia	Alpecin–Deceuninck	23	81	+ 3h 33' 44"	
186	Lionel Taminiaux	Belgium	Alpecin–Deceuninck	26	127	+ 5h 11' 20"	
187	Gianni Vermeersch	Belgium	Alpecin–Deceuninck	29	82	+ 3h 42' 48"	
188	Jay Vine	Australia	Alpecin–Deceuninck	26	DNF-18	–	
191	Jetse Bol	Netherlands	Burgos BH	32	89	+ 3h 51' 27"	
192	Óscar Cabedo	Spain	Burgos BH	27	22	+ 1h 00' 54"	
193	José Manuel Díaz	Spain	Burgos BH	27	43	+ 1h 55' 36"	
194	Jesús Ezquerra	Spain	Burgos BH	31	68	+ 3h 09' 07"	
195	Victor Langellotti	Monaco	Burgos BH	27	DNF-8	–	
196	Daniel Navarro	Spain	Burgos BH	39	44	+ 2h 04' 57"	
197	Ander Okamika	Spain	Burgos BH	29	96	+ 4h 01' 39"	
198	Manuel Peñalver †	Spain	Burgos BH	23	COV-1	–	
201	Roger Adrià †	Spain	Equipo Kern Pharma	24	COV-11	–	
202	Urko Berrade †	Spain	Equipo Kern Pharma	24	66	+ 3h 06' 38"	
203	Héctor Carretero	Spain	Equipo Kern Pharma	27	COV-11	–	
204	Francisco Galván †	Spain	Equipo Kern Pharma	24	105	+ 4h 16' 50"	
205	Raúl García Pierna †	Spain	Equipo Kern Pharma	21	47	+ 2h 15' 48"	
206	Pau Miquel †	Spain	Equipo Kern Pharma	21	COV-11	–	
207	José Félix Parra †	Spain	Equipo Kern Pharma	25	26	+ 1h 05' 02"	
208	Vojtěch Řepa †	Czechia	Equipo Kern Pharma	22	77	+ 3h 27' 42"	
211	Mikel Bizkarra	Spain	Euskaltel–Euskadi	32	28	+ 1h 20' 34"	
212	Xabier Azparren †	Spain	Euskaltel–Euskadi	23	94	+ 3h 59' 57"	
213	Ibai Azurmendi	Spain	Euskaltel–Euskadi	26	86	+ 3h 48' 06"	
214	Joan Bou †	Spain	Euskaltel–Euskadi	25	83	+ 3h 43' 14"	
215	Carlos Canal †	Spain	Euskaltel–Euskadi	21	84	+ 3h 43' 36"	
216	Mikel Iturria	Spain	Euskaltel–Euskadi	30	93	+ 3h 57' 28"	
217	Gotzon Martín	Spain	Euskaltel–Euskadi	26	76	+ 3h 22' 03"	
218	Luis Ángel Maté	Spain	Euskaltel–Euskadi	38	62	+ 2h 44' 52"	
221	Élie Gesbert	France	Arkéa–Samsic	27	42	+ 1h 55' 17"	
222	Anthony Delaplace	France	Arkéa–Samsic	32	COV-8	–	
223	Thibault Guernalec †	France	Arkéa–Samsic	25	DNF-13	–	
224	Simon Guglielmi †	France	Arkéa–Samsic	25	60	+ 2h 40' 00"	
225	Daniel McLay	Great Britain	Arkéa–Samsic	30	120	+ 4h 50' 41"	
226	Łukasz Owsian	Poland	Arkéa–Samsic	32	90	+ 3h 51' 50"	
227	Clément Russo	France	Arkéa–Samsic	27	116	+ 4h 42' 15"	

=== By team ===
(Netherlands) Team Jumbo–Visma (TJV)
No.	Rider	Pos.
1	Primož Roglič (SLO)	DNS-17
2	Edoardo Affini (ITA)	DNS-10
3	Rohan Dennis (AUS)	52
4	Robert Gesink (NED)	41
5	Chris Harper (AUS)	33
6	Sepp Kuss (USA)	DNS-9
7	Sam Oomen (NED)	30
8	Mike Teunissen (NED)	91

(France) AG2R Citroën Team (ALM)
No.	Rider	Pos.
11	Ben O'Connor (AUS)	8
12	Clément Champoussin (FRA)	32
13	Jaakko Hänninen (FIN)	COV-7
14	Bob Jungels (LUX)	51
15	Nans Peters (FRA)	61
16	Nicolas Prodhomme (FRA)	73
17	Antoine Raugel (FRA)	115
18	Andrea Vendrame (ITA)	COV-7

(Kazakhstan) Astana Qazaqstan Team (AST)
No.	Rider	Pos.
21	Miguel Ángel López (COL)	4
22	Samuele Battistella (ITA)	DNS-18
23	David de la Cruz (ESP)	21
24	Yevgeniy Fedorov (KAZ)	123
25	Alexey Lutsenko (KAZ)	71
26	Vincenzo Nibali (ITA)	45
27	Vadim Pronskiy (KAZ)	38
28	Harold Tejada (COL)	65

Team Bahrain Victorious (TBV)
No.	Rider	Pos.
31	Mikel Landa (ESP)	15
32	Santiago Buitrago (COL)	COV-12
33	Gino Mäder (SUI)	20
34	Wout Poels (NED)	COV-9
35	Luis León Sánchez (ESP)	16
36	Jasha Sütterlin (GER)	85
37	Fred Wright (GBR)	67
38	Edoardo Zambanini (ITA)	36

(Germany) Bora–Hansgrohe (BOH)
No.	Rider	Pos.
41	Sam Bennett (IRL)	COV-10
42	Matteo Fabbro (ITA)	54
43	Sergio Higuita (COL)	23
44	Jai Hindley (AUS)	10
45	Wilco Kelderman (NED)	18
46	Jonas Koch (GER)	99
47	Ryan Mullen (IRL)	128
48	Danny van Poppel (NED)	121

(France) Cofidis (COF)
No.	Rider	Pos.
51	Jesús Herrada (ESP)	56
52	Bryan Coquard (FRA)	DNS-17
53	Davide Cimolai (ITA)	134
54	Thomas Champion (FRA)	98
55	Rubén Fernández (ESP)	59
56	José Herrada (ESP)	COV-10
57	Rémy Rochas (FRA)	DNF-7
58	Davide Villella (ITA)	53

(United States) EF Education–EasyPost (EFE)
No.	Rider	Pos.
61	Rigoberto Urán (COL)	9
62	Jonathan Kléver Caicedo (ECU)	69
63	Hugh Carthy (GBR)	25
64	Esteban Chaves (COL)	DNS-16
65	Merhawi Kudus (ERI)	79
66	Mark Padun (UKR)	46
67	James Shaw (GBR)	87
68	Julius van den Berg (NED)	130

(France) Groupama–FDJ (GFC)
No.	Rider	Pos.
71	Thibaut Pinot (FRA)	17
72	Bruno Armirail (FRA)	DNS-18
73	Fabian Lienhard (SUI)	122
74	Rudy Molard (FRA)	31
75	Quentin Pacher (FRA)	DNF-18
76	Sébastien Reichenbach (SUI)	24
77	Miles Scotson (AUS)	109
78	Jake Stewart (GBR)	DNS-8

(United Kingdom) INEOS Grenadiers (IGD)
No.	Rider	Pos.
81	Richard Carapaz (ECU)	14
82	Dylan van Baarle (NED)	49
83	Tao Geoghegan Hart (GBR)	19
84	Ethan Hayter (GBR)	COV-10
85	Luke Plapp (AUS)	95
86	Carlos Rodríguez (ESP)	7
87	Pavel Sivakov (FRA)	COV-11
88	Ben Turner (GBR)	72

(Belgium) Intermarché–Wanty–Gobert Matériaux (IWG)
No.	Rider	Pos.
91	Jan Bakelants (BEL)	29
92	Jan Hirt (CZE)	COV-6
93	Julius Johansen (DEN)	129
94	Louis Meintjes (RSA)	11
95	Domenico Pozzovivo (ITA)	DNS-15
96	Rein Taaramäe (EST)	DNS-17
97	Gerben Thijssen (BEL)	DNF-9
98	Boy van Poppel (NED)	COV-12

Israel–Premier Tech (IPT)
No.	Rider	Pos.
101	Michael Woods (CAN)	DNF-3
102	Patrick Bevin (NZL)	75
103	Alessandro De Marchi (ITA)	103
104	Itamar Einhorn (ISR)	DNF-8
105	Chris Froome (GBR)	114
106	Omer Goldstein (ISR)	63
107	Carl Fredrik Hagen (NOR)	34
108	Daryl Impey (RSA)	101

(Belgium) Lotto–Soudal (LTS)
No.	Rider	Pos.
111	Thomas De Gendt (BEL)	80
112	Cedric Beullens (BEL)	108
113	Filippo Conca (ITA)	COV-17
114	Steff Cras (BEL)	DNF-2
115	Jarrad Drizners (AUS)	COV-10
116	Kamil Małecki (POL)	125
117	Harry Sweeny (AUS)	COV-10
118	Maxim Van Gils (BEL)	COV-16

(Spain) Movistar Team (MOV)
No.	Rider	Pos.
121	Alejandro Valverde (ESP)	13
122	Mathias Norsgaard (DEN)	COV-10
123	Lluís Mas (ESP)	133
124	Enric Mas (ESP)	2
125	Gregor Mühlberger (AUT)	50
126	Nelson Oliveira (POR)	37
127	José Joaquín Rojas (ESP)	48
128	Carlos Verona (ESP)	35

(Belgium) Quick-Step Alpha Vinyl Team (QST)
No.	Rider	Pos.
131	Julian Alaphilippe (FRA)	DNF-11
132	Rémi Cavagna (FRA)	104
133	Dries Devenyns (BEL)	100
134	Remco Evenepoel (BEL)	1
135	Fausto Masnada (ITA)	57
136	Pieter Serry (BEL)	COV-9
137	Ilan Van Wilder (BEL)	40
138	Louis Vervaeke (BEL)	58

(Australia) Team BikeExchange–Jayco (BEX)
No.	Rider	Pos.
141	Simon Yates (GBR)	COV-11
142	Lawson Craddock (USA)	55
143	Luke Durbridge (AUS)	112
144	Kaden Groves (AUS)	113
145	Lucas Hamilton (AUS)	78
146	Michael Hepburn (AUS)	118
147	Kelland O'Brien (AUS)	DNF-14
148	Callum Scotson (AUS)	DNS-12

(Netherlands) Team DSM (DSM)
No.	Rider	Pos.
151	Thymen Arensman (NED)	6
152	Nikias Arndt (GER)	COV-8
153	Marco Brenner (GER)	74
154	John Degenkolb (GER)	124
155	Mark Donovan (GBR)	COV-8
156	Jonas Iversby Hvideberg (NOR)	110
157	Joris Nieuwenhuis (NED)	106
158	Henri Vandenabeele (BEL)	DNF-9

(United States) Trek–Segafredo (TFS)
No.	Rider	Pos.
161	Julien Bernard (FRA)	88
162	Dario Cataldo (ITA)	117
163	Kenny Elissonde (FRA)	64
164	Daan Hoole (NED)	COV-5
165	Alex Kirsch (LUX)	119
166	Juan Pedro López (ESP)	97
167	Mads Pedersen (DEN)	102
168	Antonio Tiberi (ITA)	92

(United Arab Emirates) UAE Team Emirates (UAD)
No.	Rider	Pos.
171	Marc Soler (ESP)	27
172	Pascal Ackermann (GER)	111
173	Ivo Oliveira (POR)	131
174	Juan Ayuso (ESP)	3
175	João Almeida (POR)	5
176	Brandon McNulty (USA)	70
177	Juan Sebastián Molano (COL)	126
178	Jan Polanc (SLO)	12

(Belgium) Alpecin–Deceuninck (ADC)
No.	Rider	Pos.
181	Tim Merlier (BEL)	132
182	Floris De Tier (BEL)	DNS-10
183	Jimmy Janssens (BEL)	107
184	Xandro Meurisse (BEL)	39
185	Robert Stannard (AUS)	81
186	Lionel Taminiaux (BEL)	127
187	Gianni Vermeersch (BEL)	82
188	Jay Vine (AUS)	DNF-18

(Spain) Burgos BH (BBH)
No.	Rider	Pos.
191	Jetse Bol (NED)	89
192	Óscar Cabedo (ESP)	22
193	José Manuel Díaz (ESP)	43
194	Jesús Ezquerra (ESP)	68
195	Victor Langellotti (MON)	DNF-8
196	Daniel Navarro (ESP)	44
197	Ander Okamika (ESP)	96
198	Manuel Peñalver (ESP)	COV-1

(Spain) Equipo Kern Pharma (EKP)
No.	Rider	Pos.
201	Roger Adrià (ESP)	COV-11
202	Urko Berrade (ESP)	66
203	Héctor Carretero (ESP)	COV-11
204	Francisco Galván (ESP)	105
205	Raúl García Pierna (ESP)	47
206	Pau Miquel (ESP)	COV-11
207	José Félix Parra (ESP)	26
208	Vojtěch Řepa (CZE)	77

(Spain) Euskaltel–Euskadi (EUS)
No.	Rider	Pos.
211	Mikel Bizkarra (ESP)	28
212	Xabier Azparren (ESP)	94
213	Ibai Azurmendi (ESP)	86
214	Joan Bou (ESP)	83
215	Carlos Canal (ESP)	84
216	Mikel Iturria (ESP)	93
217	Gotzon Martín (ESP)	76
218	Luis Ángel Maté (ESP)	62

(France) Arkéa–Samsic (ARK)
No.	Rider	Pos.
221	Élie Gesbert (FRA)	42
222	Anthony Delaplace (FRA)	COV-8
223	Thibault Guernalec (FRA)	DNF-13
224	Simon Guglielmi (FRA)	60
225	Daniel McLay (GBR)	120
226	Łukasz Owsian (POL)	90
227	Clément Russo (FRA)	116

=== By nationality ===
Country	No. of riders	In competition	Stage wins
Australia	16	11	3 (Kaden Groves, Jay Vine x2)
Austria	1	1	
Belgium	18	12	2 (Remco Evenepoel x2)
Canada	1	0	
Colombia	7	5	2 (Rigoberto Urán, Juan Sebastián Molano)
Czechia	2	1	
Denmark	3	2	3 (Mads Pedersen x3)
Ecuador	2	2	3 (Richard Carapaz x3)
Eritrea	1	1	
Estonia	1	0	
Finland	1	0	
France	21	13	
Germany	6	5	
Great Britain	11	7	
Ireland	2	1	2 (Sam Bennett x2)
Israel	2	1	
Italy	14	9	
Kazakhstan	3	3	
Luxembourg	2	2	
Monaco	1	0	
Netherlands	13	10	1 (Thymen Arensman)
New Zealand	1	1	
Norway	2	2	
Poland	2	2	
Portugal	3	3	
Slovenia	2	1	1 (Primož Roglič)
South Africa	2	2	1 (Louis Meintjes)
Spain	36	31	2 (Jesús Herrada, Marc Soler)
Switzerland	3	3	
Ukraine	1	1	
United States	3	2	
Total	183	134	20
