= 2022 Vuelta a España, Stage 12 to Stage 21 =

Vuelta a España stages (cycling)

The 2022 Vuelta a España was the 77th edition of Vuelta a España, one of cycling's Grand Tours. The Vuelta began in Utrecht on 19 August, and Stage 12 from Salobreña to Peñas Blancas occurred on 1 September. The race finished in Madrid on 11 September.

== Classification standings ==
Legend
| Denotes the leader of the general classification | Denotes the leader of the young rider classification |
| Denotes the leader of the points classification | Denotes the leader of the team classification |
| Denotes the leader of the mountains classification | Denotes the winner of the combativity award |

== Stage 12 ==
1 September 2022 – Salobreña to Peñas Blancas, 195.5 km (121.5 mi)

The twelfth stage featured the race's fourth summit finish as the riders headed towards the climb of Peñas Blancas. The first 105 kilometres (65 mi) were mostly flat before the riders tackled an uncategorized climb. Following the descent, the riders went towards the intermediate sprint at Estepona with 20.3 kilometres (12.6 mi) left, with the sprint offering bonus seconds to the first three riders across. Shortly after, the riders began the climb of the first-category Peñas Blancas. The climb, which last featured in the Vuelta in 2013, is 19 kilometres (12 mi) long with an average of 6.7 percent.

After around 25 kilometres (16 mi) of constant attacks, a large 32-man break escaped from the peloton. The biggest GC threat from the break was Wilco Kelderman (Bora–Hansgrohe), who was 14' 04" down. Initially, Groupama–FDJ and Quick-Step Alpha Vinyl Team controlled the gap but they gradually let the gap go out to 10 minutes. With 66 kilometres (41 mi) remaining, Samuele Battistella (Astana Qazaqstan Team) attacked from the break. He had a lead of almost a minute but he was eventually brought back by the rest of the break. Meanwhile, in the peloton, the race leader, Remco Evenepoel (Quick-Step Alpha Vinyl Team) went down together with his teammate, Ilan Van Wilder. Both riders were not injured and they eventually made it back to the peloton. Evenepoel's crash caused the break's advantage to increase to 11 1/2 minutes, which meant that Kelderman was second in the virtual GC at one point in the stage. At the foot of the climb of Peñas Blancas, the break still had an advantage of 10 minutes.

On the climb, the Alpecin–Deceuninck duo of Lionel Taminiaux and Gianni Vermeersch set the pace for Jay Vine before Matteo Fabbro (Bora–Hansgrohe) took over at the front of the break. His pace thinned out the break until Elie Gesbert (Arkéa–Samsic) attacked inside the final 5 kilometres (3.1 mi). After he was brought back, Jan Polanc (UAE Team Emirates) made an unsuccessful attack before Gesbert went again. At this point, Vine began to drop from the front group. Just under the 2-kilometre (1.2 mi)-to-go mark, Richard Carapaz (INEOS Grenadiers) launched his attack. Gesbert and Kelderman tried to go in pursuit of Carapaz but the Ecuadorian gradually increased his lead. He would not be caught as he took his first Vuelta stage win. Kelderman crossed the line in second at nine seconds down while Marc Soler (UAE Team Emirates), who was initially dropped, came back to finish third at 24 seconds down.

Meanwhile, in the peloton, Quick-Step Alpha Vinyl Team continued to pace the peloton before Team Jumbo–Visma took over on the climb. Further up the climb, Movistar Team took over the pacemaking before Enric Mas (Movistar Team) accelerated from the peloton. Evenepoel and Miguel Ángel López (Astana Qazaqstan Team) were immediately on his wheel but Primož Roglič (Team Jumbo–Visma), Carlos Rodríguez (INEOS Grenadiers), and Juan Ayuso (UAE Team Emirates) gradually caught up with them. Inside the final 2 kilometres (1.2 mi), Rodríguez tried to make his move but he did not gap the rest of the group. Towards the line, Rodríguez and López were dropped by Evenepoel's pace. Evenepoel, Roglič, Mas, and Ayuso finished seven and a half minutes down while López and Rodríguez lost six and 11 seconds, respectively. The rest of the contenders lost between 28 seconds and around a minute and a half.

In the GC, Evenepoel kept the red jersey, maintaining his advantage over Roglič, Mas, and Ayuso. Despite losing 11 seconds, Rodríguez kept his fourth place. With their time gains from the break, Kelderman and Polanc entered the top ten at sixth and ninth, respectively. Another change was López overtaking João Almeida (UAE Team Emirates) for seventh place while Tao Geoghegan Hart (INEOS Grenadiers) dropped to tenth.

Stage 12 result
| Rank | Rider | Team | Time |
|---|---|---|---|
| 1 | Richard Carapaz (ECU) | INEOS Grenadiers | 4h 38' 26" |
| 2 | Wilco Kelderman (NED) | Bora–Hansgrohe | + 9" |
| 3 | Marc Soler (ESP) | UAE Team Emirates | + 24" |
| 4 | Jan Polanc (SLO) | UAE Team Emirates | + 26" |
| 5 | Marco Brenner (GER) | Team DSM | + 34" |
| 6 | Élie Gesbert (FRA) | Arkéa–Samsic | + 56" |
| 7 | Jay Vine (AUS) | Alpecin–Deceuninck | + 1' 12" |
| 8 | Carl Fredrik Hagen (NOR) | Israel–Premier Tech | + 1' 23" |
| 9 | James Shaw (GBR) | EF Education–EasyPost | + 3' 04" |
| 10 | Matteo Fabbro (ITA) | Bora–Hansgrohe | + 3' 17" |

General classification after stage 12
| Rank | Rider | Team | Time |
|---|---|---|---|
| 1 | Remco Evenepoel (BEL) | Quick-Step Alpha Vinyl Team | 44h 25' 09" |
| 2 | Primož Roglič (SLO) | Team Jumbo–Visma | + 2' 41" |
| 3 | Enric Mas (ESP) | Movistar Team | + 3' 03" |
| 4 | Carlos Rodríguez (ESP) | INEOS Grenadiers | + 4' 06" |
| 5 | Juan Ayuso (ESP) | UAE Team Emirates | + 4' 53" |
| 6 | Wilco Kelderman (NED) | Bora–Hansgrohe | + 6' 28" |
| 7 | Miguel Ángel López (COL) | Astana Qazaqstan Team | + 6' 56" |
| 8 | João Almeida (POR) | UAE Team Emirates | + 7' 18" |
| 9 | Jan Polanc (SLO) | UAE Team Emirates | + 8' 00" |
| 10 | Tao Geoghegan Hart (GBR) | INEOS Grenadiers | + 8' 05" |

== Stage 13 ==
2 September 2022 – Ronda to Montilla, 171 km (106 mi)

The thirteenth stage featured a transition stage from Ronda to Montilla. There were no categorized climbs on the route but the entirety of the stage had a rolling terrain with several lumps on the route. The intermediate sprint was located in Espejo with 14.6 kilometres (9.1 mi) to go while also offering bonus seconds to the first three riders across. Near the finish, the riders went up two short climbs, including one in the final 700 metres (2,300 ft) which averaged 5 percent.

Before the stage, it was reported that Juan Ayuso (UAE Team Emirates), who was fifth on GC, tested positive for COVID-19. However, a PCR test deemed that he had a low risk of infectivity and thus, he remained in the race. Immediately as the stage started, Joan Bou (Euskaltel–Euskadi), Ander Okamika (Burgos BH), and Julius van den Berg (EF Education–EasyPost) broke away from the peloton. The peloton quickly gave the break an advantage of around two and a half minutes before the sprinters' teams controlled the gap. Soon, the gap went past three minutes before the peloton began to decrease the break's advantage. Right after the riders went past the intermediate sprint, van den Berg was dropped from the break before getting swept by the peloton, with the other two also getting caught shortly after. The bunch soon headed towards an inevitable sprint, with Team Jumbo–Visma leading the peloton into the final kilometer as they teed up Primož Roglič for the uphill drag to the line. On the uphill section, Trek–Segafredo began their lead out before Pascal Ackermann (UAE Team Emirates) launched an early sprint. Mads Pedersen (Trek–Segafredo) went after him before going past the German near the finish. Pedersen would not be caught as he took the stage win. Bryan Coquard (Cofidis) had a late surge to finish second while Ackermann held on for third. All the GC contenders finished in the front group as Remco Evenepoel (Quick-Step Alpha Vinyl Team) kept the red jersey ahead of a weekend of mountain stages.

Stage 13 result
| Rank | Rider | Team | Time |
|---|---|---|---|
| 1 | Mads Pedersen (DEN) | Trek–Segafredo | 3h 46' 01" |
| 2 | Bryan Coquard (FRA) | Cofidis | + 0" |
| 3 | Pascal Ackermann (GER) | UAE Team Emirates | + 0" |
| 4 | Fred Wright (GBR) | Team Bahrain Victorious | + 0" |
| 5 | Danny van Poppel (NED) | Bora–Hansgrohe | + 0" |
| 6 | Quentin Pacher (FRA) | Groupama–FDJ | + 0" |
| 7 | Jesús Ezquerra (ESP) | Burgos BH | + 0" |
| 8 | Maxim Van Gils (BEL) | Lotto–Soudal | + 0" |
| 9 | Primož Roglič (SLO) | Team Jumbo–Visma | + 0" |
| 10 | Urko Berrade (ESP) | Equipo Kern Pharma | + 0" |

General classification after stage 13
| Rank | Rider | Team | Time |
|---|---|---|---|
| 1 | Remco Evenepoel (BEL) | Quick-Step Alpha Vinyl Team | 48h 11' 10" |
| 2 | Primož Roglič (SLO) | Team Jumbo–Visma | + 2' 41" |
| 3 | Enric Mas (ESP) | Movistar Team | + 3' 03" |
| 4 | Carlos Rodríguez (ESP) | INEOS Grenadiers | + 4' 06" |
| 5 | Juan Ayuso (ESP) | UAE Team Emirates | + 4' 53" |
| 6 | Wilco Kelderman (NED) | Bora–Hansgrohe | + 6' 28" |
| 7 | Miguel Ángel López (COL) | Astana Qazaqstan Team | + 6' 56" |
| 8 | João Almeida (POR) | UAE Team Emirates | + 7' 18" |
| 9 | Jan Polanc (SLO) | UAE Team Emirates | + 8' 00" |
| 10 | Tao Geoghegan Hart (GBR) | INEOS Grenadiers | + 8' 05" |

== Stage 14 ==
3 September 2022 – Montoro to Sierra de La Pandera, 160.3 km (99.6 mi)

The race returned to the mountains on the fourteenth stage as the riders headed towards a summit finish at Sierra de La Pandera. The first 83 kilometres (52 mi) were mostly flat before the riders gradually climbed towards the foot of the third-category Puerto de Siete Pilillas. Following the descent, the riders passed through the intermediate sprint with 33.1 kilometres (20.6 mi) left. After an uncategorized climb, the riders reached the foot of the second-category Puerto de Los Villares, a 10.4-kilometre (6.5 mi) climb with an average of 5.5 percent. As the riders crested the top, which offered bonus seconds, there was a 3.7-kilometre (2.3 mi) plateau section before the final climb, the first-category Sierra de La Pandera. The climb is 8.4 kilometres (5.2 mi) long with an average of 7.8 percent and also featured multiple 15 percent sections. Towards the top, there was a short descent before once again ramping up near the finish line.

The start of the stage was marked by a long fight for the break. It took more than 60 kilometres (37 mi) before an attack by Richard Carapaz (INEOS Grenadiers) and Alexey Lutsenko (Astana Qazaqstan Team) got some leeway from the peloton. They were joined by eight other riders to form the break of the day. The break built a maximum advantage of four and a half minutes over the peloton, which was being led by Quick-Step Alpha Vinyl Team. As the break reached the intermediate sprint, Mads Pedersen (Trek–Segafredo) took maximum points to further extend his lead in the points classification. The advantage hovered around four minutes as the riders headed towards the foot of the penultimate climb, the Puerto de Los Villares. On the climb, the break began to split with the riders beginning to attack each other. Towards the top, Luis León Sánchez (Team Bahrain Victorious) got a gap over his breakaway companions, taking a 15-second lead at the top. On the short plateau section before the final climb, Carapaz caught up with Sánchez out front. They were soon joined by Clément Champoussin (AG2R Citroën Team) and Filippo Conca (Lotto–Soudal) to form a quartet up front. With around 3.3 kilometres (2.1 mi) to go, Carapaz dropped his breakaway companions in pursuit of the stage win. He would not be caught as he took his second stage win in a span of three days.

Meanwhile, in the peloton, Quick-Step Alpha Vinyl Team continued to pace the peloton until they reached the climb of Puerto de Los Villares. In the middle of the climb, Team Jumbo–Visma took over at the front of the peloton, eating into the break's advantage. The peloton continued to thin out before Primož Roglič (Team Jumbo–Visma) attacked with around 4 kilometres (2.5 mi) remaining. The race leader, Remco Evenepoel (Quick-Step Alpha Vinyl Team) tried to bring Roglič back but it soon appeared that he was struggling as the other contenders began to drop him. Roglič was soon joined by Enric Mas (Movistar Team) and Miguel Ángel López (Astana Qazaqstan Team), with the trio increasing their lead over Evenepoel. Near the top, Mas was dropped as Roglič and López tried to catch Carapaz. They eventually fell short by seven seconds, with López and Roglič taking second and third, respectively. João Almeida (UAE Team Emirates) passed and dropped Mas, finishing a further 19 seconds behind while Mas and Carlos Rodríguez (INEOS Grenadiers) finished 28 seconds behind López and Roglič. Thymen Arensman (Team DSM) was 43 seconds down while five seconds later, Evenepoel finished with Juan Ayuso (UAE Team Emirates), who suffered from an untimely puncture on the climb.

In the GC, Evenepoel retained the red jersey with a reduced advantage of 1' 49" on Roglič, who gained 52 seconds on the Belgian, including bonus seconds. Mas and Rodríguez gained 20 seconds and retained their GC positions while Ayuso rounded out the top five. López and Almeida moved up to sixth and seventh, respectively, having overtaken Wilco Kelderman (Bora–Hansgrohe), who lost more than a minute. Tao Geoghegan Hart (INEOS Grenadiers) moved up to ninth while Ben O'Connor (AG2R Citroën Team) moved inside the top ten.

Stage 14 result
| Rank | Rider | Team | Time |
|---|---|---|---|
| 1 | Richard Carapaz (ECU) | INEOS Grenadiers | 4h 09' 27" |
| 2 | Miguel Ángel López (COL) | Astana Qazaqstan Team | + 8" |
| 3 | Primož Roglič (SLO) | Team Jumbo–Visma | + 8" |
| 4 | João Almeida (POR) | UAE Team Emirates | + 27" |
| 5 | Carlos Rodríguez (ESP) | INEOS Grenadiers | + 36" |
| 6 | Enric Mas (ESP) | Movistar Team | + 36" |
| 7 | Thymen Arensman (NED) | Team DSM | + 51" |
| 8 | Remco Evenepoel (BEL) | Quick-Step Alpha Vinyl Team | + 56" |
| 9 | Juan Ayuso (ESP) | UAE Team Emirates | + 56" |
| 10 | Wilco Kelderman (NED) | Bora–Hansgrohe | + 1' 24" |

General classification after stage 14
| Rank | Rider | Team | Time |
|---|---|---|---|
| 1 | Remco Evenepoel (BEL) | Quick-Step Alpha Vinyl Team | 52h 21' 33" |
| 2 | Primož Roglič (SLO) | Team Jumbo–Visma | + 1' 49" |
| 3 | Enric Mas (ESP) | Movistar Team | + 2' 43" |
| 4 | Carlos Rodríguez (ESP) | INEOS Grenadiers | + 3' 46" |
| 5 | Juan Ayuso (ESP) | UAE Team Emirates | + 4' 53" |
| 6 | Miguel Ángel López (COL) | Astana Qazaqstan Team | + 6' 02" |
| 7 | João Almeida (POR) | UAE Team Emirates | + 6' 49" |
| 8 | Wilco Kelderman (NED) | Bora–Hansgrohe | + 6' 56" |
| 9 | Tao Geoghegan Hart (GBR) | INEOS Grenadiers | + 8' 49" |
| 10 | Ben O'Connor (AUS) | AG2R Citroën Team | + 9' 12" |

== Stage 15 ==
4 September 2022 – Martos to Sierra Nevada, 148.1 km (92.0 mi)

The fifteenth stage featured the race's queen stage, with the riders heading towards the highest point of this year's Vuelta at Sierra Nevada. The first 27.3 kilometres (17.0 mi) were mostly flat before the riders went up the third-category Puerto del Castillo. Following an undulating section and a valley section, the riders passed through the intermediate sprint in Granada with 60.3 kilometres (37.5 mi) left. Shortly afterwards, the riders went up the first-category Alto del Purche, which is 9.1 kilometres (5.7 mi) long with an average of 7.6 percent. Bonus seconds were on offer at the top of the climb, 42.2 kilometres (26.2 mi) from the finish. Following the descent, the riders faced an uncategorized climb before reaching the foot of the final climb of the day, the special-category Alto Hoya de la Mora, a 22.3-kilometre (13.9 mi) climb with an average of 7.9 percent. The riders headed to the top via the Alto de Hazallanas, with the first 4.5 kilometres (2.8 mi) of the climb averaging more than 10 percent. Afterwards, the rest of the climb towards Sierra Nevada averages 5.5 percent, with the riders finishing at 2,512 metres (8,241 ft) above sea level.

At the start of the stage, six riders got a gap over the rest of the peloton. As the riders continued attacking, there was a crash that involved Wilco Kelderman (Bora–Hansgrohe), who suffered from bruises but was able to get back to the peloton. Up front, only Rohan Dennis (Team Jumbo–Visma), Vincenzo Nibali (Astana Qazaqstan Team), and Hugh Carthy (EF Education–EasyPost) remained until they were eventually joined by 26 other riders to form the break of the day. The best-placed GC man in the break was Thymen Arensman (Team DSM), who was only 9' 14" down. Quick-Step Alpha Vinyl Team soon began to control the peloton, allowing the gap to reach six minutes before AG2R Citroën Team took over as Arensman threatened Ben O'Connor's place on GC. Back at the front, the break kept working together until Lawson Craddock (Team BikeExchange–Jayco) launched an attack with 80 kilometres (50 mi) to go. He extended his lead over the chasers to around a minute and a half as he reached the penultimate climb, the Alto del Purche. Eventually, Jay Vine (Alpecin–Deceuninck) accelerated out of the chasing group. He caught Craddock near the top before sprinting to take the maximum KOM points, adding to his lead in the KOM classification.

With 28 kilometres (17 mi) to go, the lead duo was caught by the reduced chasing group, with the peloton five minutes behind. At the bottom of the final climb, Marc Soler (UAE Team Emirates) attacked the break, going solo out front. He led by as much as 50 seconds over the chasing group, which was reduced to just seven riders. 8.7 kilometres (5.4 mi) from the finish, Arensman attacked out of the chasing group. He caught up with Soler with 7 kilometres (4.3 mi) left before dropping the Spaniard after a few hundred meters. Arensman gradually increased his gap over the chasers to almost a minute and a half. He maintained his advantage all the way to the finish to win his first Grand Tour stage.

In the peloton, AG2R Citroën Team continued to pace the group before Team Jumbo–Visma took control of the pace near the foot of the final climb. The team set a furious pace on the bottom of the climb, splitting the peloton into pieces. As the dust settled, most of the top seven riders on GC, as well as O'Connor, remained in the red jersey group. The only exceptions were the UAE Team Emirates duo of Juan Ayuso and João Almeida, who were dangling separately at around half a minute back. Towards the end of the steep section of the climb, Carlos Rodríguez (INEOS Grenadiers) was dropped from the main group. Remco Evenepoel (Quick-Step Alpha Vinyl Team) took up most of the pacemaking in the group before linking up with his teammate, Louis Vervaeke, who was in the break. 11 kilometres (6.8 mi) from the finish, Miguel Ángel López (Astana Qazaqstan Team) accelerated from the red jersey group, followed soon after by Enric Mas (Movistar Team). Both riders made their way towards the remnants of the break, increasing their lead to around half a minute over Evenepoel, who had Primož Roglič (Team Jumbo–Visma) and O'Connor with him. Inside the last 2 kilometres (1.2 mi), Roglič and O'Connor dropped Evenepoel, with both riders eventually gaining 15 seconds on the race leader but also losing 27 seconds to Mas, including bonus seconds. Meanwhile, Ayuso and Almeida were able to catch and drop Rodríguez, with Ayuso eventually passing Evenepoel towards the finish while Almeida finished just 11 seconds down on the Belgian.

In the GC, Evenepoel kept the red jersey by a margin of 1' 34" over Roglič while Mas's time gains allowed him to move within 2' 01" of the race lead. Ayuso moved up to fourth after he gained more than a minute and a half on Rodríguez. López retained sixth place but his deficit to Rodríguez for fifth place was reduced to just eight seconds. Almeida limited his losses to retain his seventh place while Arensman and Jai Hindley (Bora–Hansgrohe) moved back inside the top ten after being in the break. O'Connor's strong ride also allowed him to move up a place into ninth.

Stage 15 result
| Rank | Rider | Team | Time |
|---|---|---|---|
| 1 | Thymen Arensman (NED) | Team DSM | 4h 17' 17" |
| 2 | Enric Mas (ESP) | Movistar Team | + 1' 23" |
| 3 | Miguel Ángel López (COL) | Astana Qazaqstan Team | + 1' 25" |
| 4 | Jay Vine (AUS) | Alpecin–Deceuninck | + 1' 30" |
| 5 | Primož Roglič (SLO) | Team Jumbo–Visma | + 1' 44" |
| 6 | Ben O'Connor (AUS) | AG2R Citroën Team | + 1' 44" |
| 7 | Juan Ayuso (ESP) | UAE Team Emirates | + 1' 55" |
| 8 | Jai Hindley (AUS) | Bora–Hansgrohe | + 1' 55" |
| 9 | Louis Meintjes (RSA) | Intermarché–Wanty–Gobert Matériaux | + 1' 55" |
| 10 | Remco Evenepoel (BEL) | Quick-Step Alpha Vinyl Team | + 1' 59" |

General classification after stage 15
| Rank | Rider | Team | Time |
|---|---|---|---|
| 1 | Remco Evenepoel (BEL) | Quick-Step Alpha Vinyl Team | 56h 40' 49" |
| 2 | Primož Roglič (SLO) | Team Jumbo–Visma | + 1' 34" |
| 3 | Enric Mas (ESP) | Movistar Team | + 2' 01" |
| 4 | Juan Ayuso (ESP) | UAE Team Emirates | + 4' 49" |
| 5 | Carlos Rodríguez (ESP) | INEOS Grenadiers | + 5' 16" |
| 6 | Miguel Ángel López (COL) | Astana Qazaqstan Team | + 5' 24" |
| 7 | João Almeida (POR) | UAE Team Emirates | + 7' 00" |
| 8 | Thymen Arensman (NED) | Team DSM | +7' 05" |
| 9 | Ben O'Connor (AUS) | AG2R Citroën Team | + 8' 57" |
| 10 | Jai Hindley (AUS) | Bora–Hansgrohe | + 11' 36" |

== Rest day 3 ==
5 September 2022 – Sanlúcar de Barrameda

== Stage 16 ==
6 September 2022 – Sanlúcar de Barrameda to Tomares, 188.9 km (117.4 mi)

Following the last rest day, the riders tackled a flat stage that featured the penultimate chance for the sprinters to challenge for the stage win. The stage was mostly flat throughout but there two small lumps in the last 13 kilometres (8.1 mi) that could spark some late attacks. The first of these lumps was 1.5 kilometres (0.93 mi) long with an average of 6 percent while the second lump was 600 metres (2,000 ft) long with an average of 8 percent. The riders passed through the intermediate sprint with 28.4 kilometres (17.6 mi) left, with the sprint offering bonus seconds. The finish of the stage was slightly uphill.

As soon as the stage started, Ander Okamika (Burgos BH) and Luis Ángel Maté (Euskaltel–Euskadi) attacked out of the peloton. Both riders built a maximum advantage of almost four minutes with Trek–Segafredo and Cofidis mainly controlling the pace in the peloton. As the riders came closer to the finish, the lead duo's advantage gradually came down. Close to the intermediate sprint, the break's lead stood at less than a minute. Maté and Okamika took the maximum points while Mads Pedersen (Trek–Segafredo) took third place to further extend his lead in the points classification. The break hovered out front until they were reeled in with 13.8 kilometres (8.6 mi) remaining. Shortly after both riders were caught, Ibai Azurmendi (Euskaltel–Euskadi) attacked but he was quickly brought back.

The sprinters' teams and the GC teams soon took station at the front of the peloton. As the riders tackled a short climb inside the final 3 kilometres (1.9 mi), Primož Roglič (Team Jumbo–Visma) accelerated out of the peloton. Pascal Ackermann (UAE Team Emirates) was the only rider able to follow him while Pedersen, who had Danny van Poppel (Bora–Hansgrohe) and Fred Wright (Team Bahrain Victorious) with him, went off in pursuit of the two. They caught up with the lead duo to make it five out front, holding a small gap over the peloton. Meanwhile, from behind, the race leader, Remco Evenepoel (Quick-Step Alpha Vinyl Team), allegedly suffered a puncture but his mechanical happened in the last 3 kilometres (1.9 mi), which meant that he was credited with the same time as the main peloton. Up front, Roglič led out the group as he attempted to increase his gap over the other GC contenders. As the lead quintet sprinted for the win, Roglič collided with Wright, causing Roglic to crash heavily while Wright was able to stay upright. Amidst the chaos, Pedersen launched his sprint and no one came around him as he took his second stage win. Ackermann finished second while van Poppel took third. The reduced peloton finished eight seconds down while Roglič, who was credited with the same time as the lead group, crossed the line with several cuts on his right side. In the GC, Evenepoel kept the red jersey, with his advantage over Roglič reduced by eight seconds. The rest of the top ten remained unchanged.

Stage 16 result
| Rank | Rider | Team | Time |
|---|---|---|---|
| 1 | Mads Pedersen (DEN) | Trek–Segafredo | 4h 45' 29" |
| 2 | Pascal Ackermann (GER) | UAE Team Emirates | + 0" |
| 3 | Danny van Poppel (NED) | Bora–Hansgrohe | + 0" |
| 4 | Fred Wright (GBR) | Team Bahrain Victorious | + 0" |
| 5 | Quentin Pacher (FRA) | Groupama–FDJ | + 8" |
| 6 | Samuele Battistella (ITA) | Astana Qazaqstan Team | + 8" |
| 7 | Cédric Beullens (BEL) | Lotto–Soudal | + 8" |
| 8 | Clement Russo (FRA) | Arkéa–Samsic | + 8" |
| 9 | Jesús Ezquerra (ESP) | Burgos BH | + 8" |
| 10 | Julius van den Berg (NED) | EF Education–EasyPost | + 8" |

General classification after stage 16
| Rank | Rider | Team | Time |
|---|---|---|---|
| 1 | Remco Evenepoel (BEL) | Quick-Step Alpha Vinyl Team | 61h 26' 26" |
| 2 | Primož Roglič (SLO) | Team Jumbo–Visma | + 1' 26" |
| 3 | Enric Mas (ESP) | Movistar Team | + 2' 01" |
| 4 | Juan Ayuso (ESP) | UAE Team Emirates | + 4' 49" |
| 5 | Carlos Rodríguez (ESP) | INEOS Grenadiers | + 5' 16" |
| 6 | Miguel Ángel López (COL) | Astana Qazaqstan Team | + 5' 24" |
| 7 | João Almeida (POR) | UAE Team Emirates | + 7' 00" |
| 8 | Thymen Arensman (NED) | Team DSM | + 7' 05" |
| 9 | Ben O'Connor (AUS) | AG2R Citroën Team | + 8' 57" |
| 10 | Jai Hindley (AUS) | Bora–Hansgrohe | + 11' 36" |

== Stage 17 ==
7 September 2022 – Aracena to Monasterio de Tentudía, 160 km (99 mi)

The seventeenth stage featured another uphill finish as the riders finished atop the Monasterio de Tentudía. Almost the entirety of the stage was ridden on a rolling terrain with almost no flat kilometers. With 29.1 kilometres (18.1 mi) left, the riders passed through the intermediate sprint, which offered bonus seconds to the first three riders across. Afterwards, the riders headed towards the only categorized climb of the day, the second-category Monasterio de Tentudía. The climb is 10.3 kilometres (6.4 mi) long with an average of 5 percent but there were a few kilometers of flat section in the middle of the climb. The last 4 kilometres (2.5 mi) of the climb has an average of 7.6 percent.

Before the start of the stage, the big news on the day was the abandonment of Primož Roglič (Team Jumbo–Visma), who was second in the GC, as a consequence of his crash before the finish the previous day. After the flag dropped, multiple riders attempted the get into the break before a group of 13 riders managed to build a significant gap over the peloton. The best-placed GC rider in the break was Rigoberto Urán (EF Education–EasyPost), who was 14' 56" down. Just as the break was getting established, Juan Ayuso (UAE Team Emirates), who was virtually third on GC, was involved in a crash but he managed to escape unscathed. Quick-Step Alpha Vinyl Team set a steady pace in the peloton for the majority of the stage, allowing the break to extend their advantage to seven and a half minutes. As the riders headed towards the final climb, the break maintained their seven-minute advantage over the peloton, making it certain that the stage would be fought between the breakaway riders.

With 18 kilometres (11 mi) to go, Lawson Craddock (Team BikeExchange–Jayco) attacked out of the break. He launched more attacks until he pried himself from his breakaway companions with 14 kilometres (8.7 mi) remaining. His lead hovered around 20 seconds over the chasing group, which began to split as the attacks started to come. Six riders emerged as the strongest chasers but Craddock still maintained his gap heading into the climb's steepest section. Going into the final 2 kilometres (1.2 mi), Jesús Herrada (Cofidis), Quentin Pacher (Groupama–FDJ), Kenny Elissonde (Trek–Segafredo), Clément Champoussin (AG2R Citroën Team), Marc Soler (UAE Team Emirates), and Uran were around 10 seconds behind Craddock, who was eventually reeled back before the final kilometer. Just as Craddock was caught, Champoussin immediately attacked but Herrada caught him before attacking himself. Uran went off in pursuit of Herrada, catching the Spaniard before sprinting for the stage win. Uran held off a fast-finishing Pacher to win the stage, completing his set of taking a stage win at all three Grand Tours.

Meanwhile, in the peloton, the riders rode a steady pace ahead of the final climb. As they reached the climb's steepest section, Enric Mas (Movistar Team) tried to launch several attacks but Remco Evenepoel (Quick-Step Alpha Vinyl Team) was immediately on his wheel. After a while, João Almeida (UAE Team Emirates) attacked, forcing Miguel Ángel López (Astana Qazaqstan Team) to give chase. Almeida eventually finished nine seconds ahead of Evenepoel and Mas, who was two seconds further ahead of Ayuso. The rest of the contenders finished between four and 14 seconds behind Evenepoel while Thymen Arensman (Team DSM) lost 41 seconds. In the GC, with Roglič's withdrawal, Evenepoel's lead over Mas in second place was now two minutes while Ayuso moved up inside the podium. Almeida gained 18 seconds on López to move to within 1' 18" of the Colombian's fifth place. Uran gained more than five minutes with his ride in the break, allowing him to move up into ninth on GC.

Stage 17 result
| Rank | Rider | Team | Time |
|---|---|---|---|
| 1 | Rigoberto Urán (COL) | EF Education–EasyPost | 3h 42' 28" |
| 2 | Quentin Pacher (FRA) | Groupama–FDJ | + 0" |
| 3 | Jesús Herrada (ESP) | Cofidis | + 2" |
| 4 | Marc Soler (ESP) | UAE Team Emirates | + 15" |
| 5 | Kenny Elissonde (FRA) | Trek–Segafredo | + 26" |
| 6 | Clément Champoussin (FRA) | AG2R Citroën Team | + 29" |
| 7 | Alessandro De Marchi (ITA) | Israel–Premier Tech | + 46" |
| 8 | Bob Jungels (LUX) | AG2R Citroën Team | + 55" |
| 9 | Élie Gesbert (FRA) | Arkéa–Samsic | + 1' 09" |
| 10 | Lawson Craddock (USA) | Team BikeExchange–Jayco | + 1' 30" |

General classification after stage 17
| Rank | Rider | Team | Time |
|---|---|---|---|
| 1 | Remco Evenepoel (BEL) | Quick-Step Alpha Vinyl Team | 65h 14' 05" |
| 2 | Enric Mas (ESP) | Movistar Team | + 2' 01" |
| 3 | Juan Ayuso (ESP) | UAE Team Emirates | + 4' 51" |
| 4 | Carlos Rodríguez (ESP) | INEOS Grenadiers | + 5' 20" |
| 5 | Miguel Ángel López (COL) | Astana Qazaqstan Team | + 5' 33" |
| 6 | João Almeida (POR) | UAE Team Emirates | + 6' 51" |
| 7 | Thymen Arensman (NED) | Team DSM | + 7' 46" |
| 8 | Ben O'Connor (AUS) | AG2R Citroën Team | + 9' 11" |
| 9 | Rigoberto Urán (COL) | EF Education–EasyPost | + 9' 33" |
| 10 | Jai Hindley (AUS) | Bora–Hansgrohe | + 11' 40" |

== Stage 18 ==
8 September 2022 – Trujillo to Alto del Piornal, 191.7 km (119.1 mi)

The eighteenth stage featured the last summit finish of the race as the riders finished atop the Alto del Piornal. The terrain on the first 80 kilometres (50 mi) was mostly undulating before the riders went up an uncategorized climb. Immediately after that climb, the riders tackled the second-category Alto de la Desesperá, which is 3.7 kilometres (2.3 mi) long with an average of 9.4 percent. Following the descent and a valley section, the riders passed through the intermediate sprint with 54.2 kilometres (33.7 mi) left. The sprint was located right at the foot of the first-category Alto del Piornal, a 13.5-kilometre (8.4 mi) long climb with an average of 5 percent. At the top, 40.8 kilometres (25.4 mi) from the finish, there were bonus seconds on offer to the first three riders across. After the descent and a short flat section, the riders climbed up a different side of the Alto del Piornal. On this occasion, the climb is 13.3 kilometres (8.3 mi) long with an average of 5.5 percent, with the stage finishing at the top.

There was another furious fight for the breakaway as it took more than 50 kilometres (31 mi) before a large 41-man break escaped from the peloton. There was no GC threat in the break since the best-placed GC rider was Richard Carapaz (INEOS Grenadiers), who was more than 26 minutes down on GC. As the fight for the break was ongoing, there was a crash that involved several riders in the peloton, including Jay Vine (Alpecin–Deceuninck), Mads Pedersen (Trek–Segafredo), and Carlos Rodríguez (INEOS Grenadiers). The biggest victim of the crash was Vine, who was forced to abandon the race, meaning that the KOM jersey passed on to Carapaz, who was second in the classification. As a consequence of the crash, Rodríguez also suffered cuts and bruises on his body, but he was able to make it back to the peloton. The break led by as much as nine minutes but the pace in the peloton increased due to an attack by João Almeida (UAE Team Emirates) with 90 kilometres (56 mi) to go. Almeida led the peloton by more than a minute before Astana Qazaqstan Team took up the chase, with Miguel Ángel López's position being threatened by Almeida. At the top of Alto de la Desesperá, the break led Almeida by almost five minutes, with the peloton a further minute down.

On the way to the first ascent of Alto del Piornal, Clément Russo (Arkéa–Samsic) attacked out of the break, building a lead of almost a minute. His lead gradually went down before he was caught just before the Alto del Piornal. At the foot of the climb, Hugh Carthy (EF Education–EasyPost) accelerated from the break. Sergio Higuita (Bora–Hansgrohe) and Thibaut Pinot (Groupama–FDJ) soon bridged up to him while a chase group composed of Carapaz, Robert Gesink (Team Jumbo–Visma), and Élie Gesbert (Arkéa–Samsic) formed behind them. With 41 kilometres (25 mi) to go, the trio of chasers caught up with the lead trio before Carapaz took the maximum KOM points to extend his virtual lead in the KOM classification. Almeida crossed the top with his teammate, Marc Soler, at around three minutes down while the red jersey group was around less than a minute down on the Portuguese. The only GC contenders missing from the group was Rodríguez, who was suffering from the effects of his crash. On the descent, Almeida and Soler caught up with the remnants of the break, which was almost three minutes down on the lead sextet. Meanwhile, Rodríguez made it back to the red jersey group, which was hovering around 40 seconds down on Almeida. At the foot of the second ascent of Alto del Piornal, the lead group led the Almeida group by a minute and a half, with the red jersey group a further half a minute down.

On the bottom of the climb, Gesbert attacked from the lead group. He built an advantage of around half a minute before Gesink went off in pursuit of him. Meanwhile, with around 10 kilometres (6.2 mi) to go, Enric Mas (Movistar Team) began to go on the offensive, but Remco Evenepoel (Quick-Step Alpha Vinyl Team) immediately marked his moves. Ben O'Connor (AG2R Citroën Team) and Thymen Arensman (Team DSM) also attacked from the peloton, gapping the other contenders and dropping Rodríguez as a result. Just over 8 kilometres (5.0 mi) from the finish, Evenepoel made an attack of his own, reeling in O'Connor and Arensman as well as catching the Almeida group in the process. The other contenders, minus Rodríguez, gradually caught up with Evenepoel, with the red jersey group trailing the lead duo by less than a minute. With around 6.5 kilometres (4.0 mi) left, Gesink dropped Gesbert to go in pursuit of the stage win. His lead over the red jersey group gradually decreased as attacks started to fly from the group. With just over a kilometre left, Mas launched an attack that was only answered by Evenepoel while Gesink's lead was down to around 20 seconds. The duo eventually caught up with Gesink in the final hundred metres before Evenepoel launched his sprint. He gapped Mas and Gesink by two seconds to win his second stage of the race. The group containing most of the other GC contenders finished 13 seconds down while Rodríguez lost more than a minute. In the GC, Evenepoel extended his lead over Mas by six seconds with his time gap and bonus seconds. López overhauled Rodríguez into fourth while Almeida moved to within 25 seconds of Rodríguez's position in fifth.

Stage 18 result
| Rank | Rider | Team | Time |
|---|---|---|---|
| 1 | Remco Evenepoel (BEL) | Quick-Step Alpha Vinyl Team | 4h 45' 17" |
| 2 | Enric Mas (ESP) | Movistar Team | + 2" |
| 3 | Robert Gesink (NED) | Team Jumbo–Visma | + 2" |
| 4 | Jai Hindley (AUS) | Bora–Hansgrohe | + 13" |
| 5 | Thymen Arensman (NED) | Team DSM | + 13" |
| 6 | Thibaut Pinot (FRA) | Groupama–FDJ | + 13" |
| 7 | Ben O'Connor (AUS) | AG2R Citroën Team | + 13" |
| 8 | Juan Ayuso (ESP) | UAE Team Emirates | + 13" |
| 9 | Miguel Ángel López (COL) | Astana Qazaqstan Team | + 13" |
| 10 | João Almeida (POR) | UAE Team Emirates | + 13" |

General classification after stage 18
| Rank | Rider | Team | Time |
|---|---|---|---|
| 1 | Remco Evenepoel (BEL) | Quick-Step Alpha Vinyl Team | 69h 59' 12" |
| 2 | Enric Mas (ESP) | Movistar Team | + 2' 07" |
| 3 | Juan Ayuso (ESP) | UAE Team Emirates | + 5' 14" |
| 4 | Miguel Ángel López (COL) | Astana Qazaqstan Team | + 5' 56" |
| 5 | Carlos Rodríguez (ESP) | INEOS Grenadiers | + 6' 49" |
| 6 | João Almeida (POR) | UAE Team Emirates | + 7' 14" |
| 7 | Thymen Arensman (NED) | Team DSM | + 8' 09" |
| 8 | Ben O'Connor (AUS) | AG2R Citroën Team | + 9' 34" |
| 9 | Rigoberto Urán (COL) | EF Education–EasyPost | + 9' 56" |
| 10 | Jai Hindley (AUS) | Bora–Hansgrohe | + 12' 03" |

== Stage 19 ==
9 September 2022 – Talavera de la Reina to Talavera de la Reina, 132.7 km (82.5 mi)

Stage 19 result
| Rank | Rider | Team | Time |
|---|---|---|---|
| 1 | Mads Pedersen (DEN) | Trek–Segafredo | 3h 19' 11" |
| 2 | Fred Wright (GBR) | Team Bahrain Victorious | + 0" |
| 3 | Gianni Vermeersch (BEL) | Alpecin–Deceuninck | + 0" |
| 4 | Ben Turner (GBR) | INEOS Grenadiers | + 0" |
| 5 | Mike Teunissen (NED) | Team Jumbo–Visma | + 0" |
| 6 | Jonas Koch (GER) | Bora–Hansgrohe | + 0" |
| 7 | Omer Goldstein (ISR) | Israel–Premier Tech | + 0" |
| 8 | Raúl García Pierna (ESP) | Equipo Kern Pharma | + 0" |
| 9 | Miguel Ángel López (COL) | Astana Qazaqstan Team | + 0" |
| 10 | Dylan van Baarle (NED) | INEOS Grenadiers | + 0" |

General classification after stage 19
| Rank | Rider | Team | Time |
|---|---|---|---|
| 1 | Remco Evenepoel (BEL) | Quick-Step Alpha Vinyl Team | 73h 18' 23" |
| 2 | Enric Mas (ESP) | Movistar Team | + 2' 07" |
| 3 | Juan Ayuso (ESP) | UAE Team Emirates | + 5' 14" |
| 4 | Miguel Ángel López (COL) | Astana Qazaqstan Team | + 5' 56" |
| 5 | Carlos Rodríguez (ESP) | INEOS Grenadiers | + 6' 49" |
| 6 | João Almeida (POR) | UAE Team Emirates | + 7' 14" |
| 7 | Thymen Arensman (NED) | Team DSM | + 8' 09" |
| 8 | Ben O'Connor (AUS) | AG2R Citroën Team | + 9' 34" |
| 9 | Rigoberto Urán (COL) | EF Education–EasyPost | + 9' 56" |
| 10 | Jai Hindley (AUS) | Bora–Hansgrohe | + 12' 03" |

== Stage 20 ==
10 September 2022 – Moralzarzal to Puerto de Navacerrada, 175.5 km (109.1 mi)

Stage 20 result
| Rank | Rider | Team | Time |
|---|---|---|---|
| 1 | Richard Carapaz (ECU) | INEOS Grenadiers | 4h 41' 34" |
| 2 | Thymen Arensman (NED) | Team DSM | + 8" |
| 3 | Juan Ayuso (ESP) | UAE Team Emirates | + 13" |
| 4 | Jai Hindley (AUS) | Bora–Hansgrohe | + 13" |
| 5 | Enric Mas (ESP) | Movistar Team | + 13" |
| 6 | Remco Evenepoel (BEL) | Quick-Step Alpha Vinyl Team | + 15" |
| 7 | Louis Meintjes (RSA) | Intermarché–Wanty–Gobert Matériaux | + 15" |
| 8 | Miguel Ángel López (COL) | Astana Qazaqstan Team | + 15" |
| 9 | João Almeida (POR) | UAE Team Emirates | + 17" |
| 10 | Sergio Higuita (COL) | Bora–Hansgrohe | + 32" |

General classification after stage 20
| Rank | Rider | Team | Time |
|---|---|---|---|
| 1 | Remco Evenepoel (BEL) | Quick-Step Alpha Vinyl Team | 78h 00' 12" |
| 2 | Enric Mas (ESP) | Movistar Team | + 2' 05" |
| 3 | Juan Ayuso (ESP) | UAE Team Emirates | + 5' 08" |
| 4 | Miguel Ángel López (COL) | Astana Qazaqstan Team | + 5' 56" |
| 5 | João Almeida (POR) | UAE Team Emirates | + 7' 16" |
| 6 | Thymen Arensman (NED) | Team DSM | + 7' 56" |
| 7 | Carlos Rodríguez (ESP) | INEOS Grenadiers | + 7' 57" |
| 8 | Ben O'Connor (AUS) | AG2R Citroën Team | + 10' 30" |
| 9 | Rigoberto Urán (COL) | EF Education–EasyPost | + 11' 04" |
| 10 | Jai Hindley (AUS) | Bora–Hansgrohe | + 12' 01" |

== Stage 21 ==
11 September 2022 – Las Rozas to Madrid, 100.5 km (62.4 mi)

Stage 21 result
| Rank | Rider | Team | Time |
|---|---|---|---|
| 1 | Juan Sebastián Molano (COL) | UAE Team Emirates | 2h 26' 36" |
| 2 | Mads Pedersen (DEN) | Trek–Segafredo | + 0" |
| 3 | Pascal Ackermann (GER) | UAE Team Emirates | + 0" |
| 4 | Mike Teunissen (NED) | Team Jumbo–Visma | + 0" |
| 5 | Danny van Poppel (NED) | Bora–Hansgrohe | + 0" |
| 6 | Kaden Groves (AUS) | Team BikeExchange–Jayco | + 0" |
| 7 | Fred Wright (GBR) | Team Bahrain Victorious | + 0" |
| 8 | Lionel Taminiaux (BEL) | Alpecin–Deceuninck | + 0" |
| 9 | Ben Turner (GBR) | INEOS Grenadiers | + 0" |
| 10 | Cedric Beullens (BEL) | Lotto–Soudal | + 0" |

General classification after stage 21
| Rank | Rider | Team | Time |
|---|---|---|---|
| 1 | Remco Evenepoel (BEL) | Quick-Step Alpha Vinyl Team | 80h 26' 59" |
| 2 | Enric Mas (ESP) | Movistar Team | + 2' 02" |
| 3 | Juan Ayuso (ESP) | UAE Team Emirates | + 4' 57" |
| 4 | Miguel Ángel López (COL) | Astana Qazaqstan Team | + 5' 56" |
| 5 | João Almeida (POR) | UAE Team Emirates | + 7' 24" |
| 6 | Thymen Arensman (NED) | Team DSM | + 7' 45" |
| 7 | Carlos Rodríguez (ESP) | INEOS Grenadiers | + 7' 57" |
| 8 | Ben O'Connor (AUS) | AG2R Citroën Team | + 10' 30" |
| 9 | Rigoberto Urán (COL) | EF Education–EasyPost | + 11' 04" |
| 10 | Jai Hindley (AUS) | Bora–Hansgrohe | + 12' 01" |
