= 2022 Vuelta a España, Stage 1 to Stage 11 =

Vuelta a España stages (cycling)

The 2022 Vuelta a España was the 77th edition of Vuelta a España, one of cycling's Grand Tours. The Vuelta began in Utrecht on 19 August, and Stage 11 from ElPozo Alimentación to Cabo de Gata occurred on 31 August. The race finished in Madrid on 11 September.

== Classification standings ==
Legend
| Denotes the leader of the general classification | Denotes the leader of the young rider classification |
| Denotes the leader of the points classification | Denotes the leader of the team classification |
| Denotes the leader of the mountains classification | Denotes the winner of the combativity award |

== Stage 1 ==
19 August 2022 – Utrecht (Netherlands) to Utrecht (Netherlands), 23.3 km (14.5 mi) (TTT)

This year's Vuelta started with a 23.3-kilometre (14.5 mi) team time trial along the streets of Utrecht in Netherlands. This marked the first time since the opening stage of the 2019 Vuelta that a team time trial featured in a World Tour race. The entirety of the course was flat but it featured several corners along the route. There was a single intermediate time check in the middle of the course. At the finish, the times were taken when fifth rider from the team crossed the line.

Burgos BH was the first team off the start ramp as the rain greeted the first teams off the ramp. The first benchmark time was set by Groupama–FDJ, who finished with a time of 25' 18". A few minutes later, Team BikeExchange–Jayco knocked Groupama–FDJ off the hot seat after beating their time by seven seconds. As they finished, the roads began to dry up. Soon after, Bora–Hansgrohe was able to go faster than Team BikeExchange–Jayco at the time check but they slowed down in the second half of the course, falling short off the hot seat by 10 seconds. UAE Team Emirates also challenged the leading time but they fell short by two seconds.

The focus soon shifted to Team Jumbo–Visma, INEOS Grenadiers, and Quick-Step Alpha Vinyl Team, three of the favorites for the stage win. INEOS Grenadiers initially set the fastest time at the time check before Quick-Step Alpha Vinyl Team went faster than their squad. At the finish, INEOS Grenadiers finished with a time of 24' 53", beating Team BikeExchange–Jayco's time and setting the first time under 25 minutes. Quick-Step Alpha Vinyl Team came close to beating their time but they were less than a second slower at the end. However, the best performance on the day went to Team Jumbo–Visma. They were 14 seconds faster than everyone at the time check before setting a time of 24' 40", winning the stage by 13 seconds over INEOS Grenadiers. Robert Gesink crossed the line first to take the first red jersey of the race, with the three-time defending champion, Primož Roglič, in second.

Stage 1 result
| Rank | Team | Time |
|---|---|---|
| 1 | Team Jumbo–Visma | 24' 40" |
| 2 | INEOS Grenadiers | + 13" |
| 3 | Quick-Step Alpha Vinyl Team | + 14" |
| 4 | Team BikeExchange–Jayco | + 31" |
| 5 | UAE Team Emirates | + 33" |
| 6 | Groupama–FDJ | + 38" |
| 7 | Bora–Hansgrohe | + 41" |
| 8 | Trek–Segafredo | + 42" |
| 9 | Team Bahrain Victorious | + 42" |
| 10 | Movistar Team | + 43" |

General classification after stage 1
| Rank | Rider | Team | Time |
|---|---|---|---|
| 1 | Robert Gesink (NED) | Team Jumbo–Visma | 24' 40" |
| 2 | Primož Roglič (SLO) | Team Jumbo–Visma | + 0" |
| 3 | Chris Harper (AUS) | Team Jumbo–Visma | + 0" |
| 4 | Sepp Kuss (USA) | Team Jumbo–Visma | + 0" |
| 5 | Rohan Dennis (AUS) | Team Jumbo–Visma | + 0" |
| 6 | Edoardo Affini (ITA) | Team Jumbo–Visma | + 0" |
| 7 | Sam Oomen (NED) | Team Jumbo–Visma | + 0" |
| 8 | Mike Teunissen (NED) | Team Jumbo–Visma | + 0" |
| 9 | Ethan Hayter (GBR) | INEOS Grenadiers | + 13" |
| 10 | Richard Carapaz (ECU) | INEOS Grenadiers | + 13" |

== Stage 2 ==
20 August 2022 – 's-Hertogenbosch (Netherlands) to Utrecht (Netherlands), 175.1 km (108.8 mi)

The Vuelta remained in Netherlands for the second stage that was expected to be for the sprinters. The first 80 kilometres (50 mi) were entirely flat before the riders tackled a 78-kilometre (48 mi) long section that featured a few lumps as well as the fourth-category climb of Alto de Amerongse. With 16.8 kilometres (10.4 mi) remaining, the riders passed through the intermediate sprint, which also featured bonus seconds of 3, 2, and 1 to the first three riders across. Afterwards, the rest of the stage was flat all the way to the finish.

After the official start, a group of five riders containing Julius van den Berg (EF Education–EasyPost), Xabier Azparren (Euskaltel–Euskadi), Thibault Guernalec (Arkéa–Samsic), Jetse Bol (Burgos BH), and Pau Miquel (Equipo Kern Pharma) went off the front. They extended their advantage to as much as five minutes before Alpecin–Deceuninck quickly brought the gap down. As the race headed towards the lone categorized climb of the day, the peloton came close to catching the break but they continued to let the quintet dangle off the front. On the climb, van den Berg took maximum points to lead the KOM classification. The quintet led the race until the 58.4-kilometre (36.3 mi)-to-go mark, when they were finally swept up by the peloton. With 45 kilometres (28 mi) left, Luis Ángel Maté (Euskaltel–Euskadi) attacked from the peloton to form a solo break. He was not able to build a significant gap and he was brought back with 21 kilometres (13 mi) remaining. The sprinters' teams soon began to set up their trains for the inevitable bunch sprint. At the finish, Danny van Poppel (Bora–Hansgrohe) managed to shepherd his team's sprinter, Sam Bennett, near the front of the peloton. Mads Pedersen (Trek–Segafredo) began his sprint first but Bennett came around him to win the stage, taking the lead in the points classification in the process. Pedersen held on for second while Tim Merlier (Alpecin–Deceuninck) took third. By finishing fourth on the stage, Mike Teunissen (Team Jumbo–Visma) took over the red jersey from his teammate, Robert Gesink.

Stage 2 result
| Rank | Rider | Team | Time |
|---|---|---|---|
| 1 | Sam Bennett (IRL) | Bora–Hansgrohe | 3h 49' 34" |
| 2 | Mads Pedersen (DEN) | Trek–Segafredo | + 0" |
| 3 | Tim Merlier (BEL) | Alpecin–Deceuninck | + 0" |
| 4 | Mike Teunissen (NED) | Team Jumbo–Visma | + 0" |
| 5 | Pascal Ackermann (GER) | UAE Team Emirates | + 0" |
| 6 | Daniel McLay (GBR) | Arkéa–Samsic | + 0" |
| 7 | Itamar Einhorn (ISR) | Israel–Premier Tech | + 0" |
| 8 | Jake Stewart (GBR) | Groupama–FDJ | + 0" |
| 9 | John Degenkolb (GER) | Team DSM | + 0" |
| 10 | Kaden Groves (AUS) | Team BikeExchange–Jayco | + 0" |

General classification after stage 2
| Rank | Rider | Team | Time |
|---|---|---|---|
| 1 | Mike Teunissen (NED) | Team Jumbo–Visma | 4h 14' 14" |
| 2 | Edoardo Affini (ITA) | Team Jumbo–Visma | + 0" |
| 3 | Sam Oomen (NED) | Team Jumbo–Visma | + 0" |
| 4 | Primož Roglič (SLO) | Team Jumbo–Visma | + 0" |
| 5 | Sepp Kuss (USA) | Team Jumbo–Visma | + 0" |
| 6 | Robert Gesink (NED) | Team Jumbo–Visma | + 0" |
| 7 | Richard Carapaz (ECU) | INEOS Grenadiers | + 13" |
| 8 | Ethan Hayter (GBR) | INEOS Grenadiers | + 13" |
| 9 | Pavel Sivakov (FRA) | INEOS Grenadiers | + 13" |
| 10 | Carlos Rodríguez (ESP) | INEOS Grenadiers | + 13" |

== Stage 3 ==
21 August 2022 – Breda (Netherlands) to Breda (Netherlands), 193.5 km (120.2 mi)

The final stage in Netherlands featured another flat stage for the pure sprinters. The parcours was flat throughout, apart from a fourth-category climb with 59.4 kilometres (36.9 mi) to go. The intermediate sprint was located in Sint Willebrord with 22.6 kilometres (14.0 mi) remaining, with the sprint offering bonus seconds to the first three riders across.

At the start of the stage, Julius van den Berg (EF Education–EasyPost) kicked off the attacks and he was soon joined by six other riders to form the break of the day. They were allowed an advantage of almost three minutes before the sprinters' teams began to take up the chase. With around 139 kilometres (86 mi) to go, there was a crash that involved Michael Woods (Israel–Premier Tech), forcing him to retire from the race. As the break passed through the only categorized climb of the day, Thomas De Gendt (Lotto–Soudal) took maximum KOM points while van den Berg took second to ensure that he kept the polka-dot jersey. Towards the intermediate sprint, the break was still out front, albeit with a gap of less than a minute over the peloton. De Gendt once again took maximum points before being dropped shortly after.

With around 21 kilometres (13 mi) left, there was a crash that involved three of INEOS Grenadiers' GC leaders: Richard Carapaz, Pavel Sivakov, and Carlos Rodríguez. They were able to escape unscathed and they quickly made their way back to the peloton. The break was soon caught at 11 kilometres (6.8 mi) from the finish before the sprinters' teams began to set up their lead-out trains. In the final kilometer, UAE Team Emirates led the peloton out for their sprinter, Pascal Ackermann, who started his sprint first. However, he was passed towards the line, where Sam Bennett (Bora–Hansgrohe) prevailed in the sprint for his second successive stage win. Mads Pedersen (Trek–Segafredo) once again finished second while Daniel McLay (Arkéa–Samsic) took third. The red jersey changed hands once again at the end of the day as Edoardo Affini (Team Jumbo–Visma) took over the race lead ahead of the race's first rest day.

Stage 3 result
| Rank | Rider | Team | Time |
|---|---|---|---|
| 1 | Sam Bennett (IRL) | Bora–Hansgrohe | 4h 05' 53" |
| 2 | Mads Pedersen (DEN) | Trek–Segafredo | + 0" |
| 3 | Daniel McLay (GBR) | Arkéa–Samsic | + 0" |
| 4 | Bryan Coquard (FRA) | Cofidis | + 0" |
| 5 | Fabian Lienhard (SUI) | Groupama–FDJ | + 0" |
| 6 | Tim Merlier (BEL) | Alpecin–Deceuninck | + 0" |
| 7 | Kaden Groves (AUS) | Team BikeExchange–Jayco | + 0" |
| 8 | Cedric Beullens (BEL) | Lotto–Soudal | + 0" |
| 9 | Pascal Ackermann (GER) | UAE Team Emirates | + 0" |
| 10 | Danny van Poppel (NED) | Bora–Hansgrohe | + 0" |

General classification after stage 3
| Rank | Rider | Team | Time |
|---|---|---|---|
| 1 | Edoardo Affini (ITA) | Team Jumbo–Visma | 8h 20' 07" |
| 2 | Sam Oomen (NED) | Team Jumbo–Visma | + 0" |
| 3 | Primož Roglič (SLO) | Team Jumbo–Visma | + 0" |
| 4 | Sepp Kuss (USA) | Team Jumbo–Visma | + 0" |
| 5 | Mike Teunissen (NED) | Team Jumbo–Visma | + 0" |
| 6 | Robert Gesink (NED) | Team Jumbo–Visma | + 0" |
| 7 | Ethan Hayter (GBR) | INEOS Grenadiers | + 13" |
| 8 | Richard Carapaz (ECU) | INEOS Grenadiers | + 13" |
| 9 | Carlos Rodríguez (ESP) | INEOS Grenadiers | + 13" |
| 10 | Pavel Sivakov (FRA) | INEOS Grenadiers | + 13" |

== Rest day 1 ==
22 August 2022 – Vitoria-Gasteiz

== Stage 4 ==
23 August 2022 – Vitoria-Gasteiz to Laguardia, 152.5 km (94.8 mi)

Following the first rest day, the race went to Spain for a hilly stage that included an uphill finish. The first 56.9 kilometres (35.4 mi) were flat before the riders tackled the second-category climb of Puerto de Opakua. Afterwards, the riders faced two uncategorized climbs before going through the intermediate sprint in Lagrán with 34.2 kilometres (21.3 mi) left. After another uncategorized climb, the riders tackled the second-category climb of Puerto de Herrera, which was crested with 14.5 kilometres (9.0 mi) to go. Bonus seconds were on offer to the first three riders across the top of the climb. Following the descent, the riders faced an uphill climb towards the finish, with the final 900 metres (3,000 ft) averaging around 8 percent.

Six riders formed the day's breakaway, which was given a maximum advantage of around three minutes. The best-placed GC rider in the break was Alexey Lutsenko (Astana Qazaqstan Team), who was only 46 seconds down at the start of the day. Bora–Hansgrohe and Team Jumbo–Visma took up the pacesetting in the peloton, keeping the break on a tight leash. On the first climb of the day, the Puerto de Opakua, Joan Bou (Euskaltel–Euskadi) took maximum KOM points to take over the lead in KOM classification. As the break went through the uncategorized climbs, Bou, Ander Okamika (Burgos BH), and Jarrad Drizners (Lotto–Soudal) were dropped from the break, leaving Lutsenko, Alessandro De Marchi (Israel–Premier Tech), and James Shaw (EF Education–EasyPost) out front. The trio's lead continued to tumble until they were caught with 34 kilometres (21 mi) left.

The peloton soon headed towards the last categorized climb, the Puerto de Herrera. Towards the top, Julian Alaphilippe (Quick-Step Alpha Vinyl Team) launched an attack that was answered by Primož Roglič (Team Jumbo–Visma). Roglič passed Alaphilippe to take maximum KOM points as well as three bonus seconds. On the descent, Remco Evenepoel (Quick-Step Alpha Vinyl Team) set a furious pace that caused some splits in the peloton but the group was all back together ahead of the final ramp to the finish. Movistar Team led the peloton into the final kilometer before Trek–Segafredo took up the lead out duties for their sprinter, Mads Pedersen, who was able to survive the climbs. With 200 metres (660 ft) remaining, Roglič launched his sprint with Pedersen in second wheel. Pedersen was not able to come around as Roglič took the stage win, going into the red jersey in the process. Third place went to Enric Mas (Movistar Team). Only 12 riders finished in the front group, getting a gap of seven seconds over the second group, which contained the likes of Simon Yates (Team BikeExchange–Jayco), Richard Carapaz (INEOS Grenadiers), and João Almeida (UAE Team Emirates).

Stage 4 result
| Rank | Rider | Team | Time |
|---|---|---|---|
| 1 | Primož Roglič (SLO) | Team Jumbo–Visma | 3h 31' 05" |
| 2 | Mads Pedersen (DEN) | Trek–Segafredo | + 0" |
| 3 | Enric Mas (ESP) | Movistar Team | + 0" |
| 4 | Quentin Pacher (FRA) | Groupama–FDJ | + 0" |
| 5 | Pavel Sivakov (FRA) | INEOS Grenadiers | + 0" |
| 6 | Ben O'Connor (AUS) | AG2R Citroën Team | + 0" |
| 7 | Ethan Hayter (GBR) | INEOS Grenadiers | + 0" |
| 8 | Remco Evenepoel (BEL) | Quick-Step Alpha Vinyl Team | + 0" |
| 9 | Wilco Kelderman (NED) | Bora–Hansgrohe | + 0" |
| 10 | Jai Hindley (AUS) | Bora–Hansgrohe | + 0" |

General classification after stage 4
| Rank | Rider | Team | Time |
|---|---|---|---|
| 1 | Primož Roglič (SLO) | Team Jumbo–Visma | 11h 50' 59" |
| 2 | Sepp Kuss (USA) | Team Jumbo–Visma | + 13" |
| 3 | Ethan Hayter (GBR) | INEOS Grenadiers | + 26" |
| 4 | Pavel Sivakov (FRA) | INEOS Grenadiers | + 26" |
| 5 | Tao Geoghegan Hart (GBR) | INEOS Grenadiers | + 26" |
| 6 | Remco Evenepoel (BEL) | Quick-Step Alpha Vinyl Team | + 27" |
| 7 | Richard Carapaz (ECU) | INEOS Grenadiers | + 33" |
| 8 | Carlos Rodríguez (ESP) | INEOS Grenadiers | + 33" |
| 9 | Mads Pedersen (DEN) | Trek–Segafredo | + 34" |
| 10 | Simon Yates (GBR) | Team BikeExchange–Jayco | + 51" |

== Stage 5 ==
24 August 2022 – Irun to Bilbao, 187.2 km (116.3 mi)

The fifth stage of the Vuelta featured a hilly parcours that was expected to be for the breakaway specialists. The first 90.4 kilometres (56.2 mi) were mostly flat before the riders tackled three third-category climbs of Puerto de Gontzagarigana, Balcón de Bizkaia, and Alto de Morga in succession. After a short valley section, the riders climbed up the second-category Alto del Vivero, which is 4.6 kilometres (2.9 mi) long with an average of 8 percent. Following the descent, the riders passed through the finish line in Bilbao for the first time, with the line acting as an intermediate sprint on this occasion. Afterwards, the riders looped back towards the Alto del Vivero as they climbed it for a second time. At the top, 14.2 kilometres (8.8 mi) from the finish, bonus seconds were on offer to the first three riders across. The riders then tackled the descent once again before making their way back to the finish line in Bilbao.

The start of the stage was marked by a furious fight for the break as several riders tried to get into the move. Eventually, with 115 kilometres (71 mi) left, a group of nine riders got a significant gap over the peloton. Successful counterattacks from the peloton meant that the break ballooned to 17 riders, with Rudy Molard (Groupama–FDJ) the best-placed GC rider in the break at only 58 seconds down while Fred Wright (Team Bahrain Victorious) was only four seconds behind him. As the riders tackled the first categorized climb of the day, Marc Soler (UAE Team Emirates) made a late attempt to bridge to the break, which was around two minutes ahead at this point. He successfully made it to the break on the second climb of the day. On each of the first three climbs, Victor Langellotti (Burgos BH) took maximum KOM points. Meanwhile, in the peloton, Team Jumbo–Visma continued to set a steady pace, content to let someone from the break take the red jersey. On the first ascent of Alto del Vivero, Lawson Craddock (Team BikeExchange–Jayco) attacked, gapping his breakaway companions. He took maximum KOM points at the top, holding off a fast-approaching Langellotti, who took second to move into the virtual lead of the KOM classification. After the riders passed through the finish line for the first time, there were 12 riders left in the break.

With around 24 kilometres (15 mi) to go, Jake Stewart (Groupama–FDJ) launched an attack. He extended his lead to around 40 seconds as the break made their way back to Alto del Vivero. On the climb, there were several counterattacks from the chasing group until Soler managed to build a gap over the other chasers. He slowly ate into Stewart's lead until Soler caught and dropped him with 15 kilometres (9.3 mi) left. Soler went across the top around 11 seconds ahead of Molard, who took two bonus seconds to extend his virtual GC lead over Wright. On the descent, the chasers regrouped after splitting on the climb, minus Stewart who suffered from leg cramps. Although the chasers came to within six seconds of making the catch, Soler held them off to win the stage. Daryl Impey (Israel–Premier Tech) finished second while Wright took third, taking four bonus seconds in the process. The peloton finished over five minutes down, which meant that Molard, who finished fourth, took the red jersey, two seconds ahead of Wright.

Stage 5 result
| Rank | Rider | Team | Time |
|---|---|---|---|
| 1 | Marc Soler (ESP) | UAE Team Emirates | 4h 15' 23" |
| 2 | Daryl Impey (RSA) | Israel–Premier Tech | + 4" |
| 3 | Fred Wright (GBR) | Team Bahrain Victorious | + 4" |
| 4 | Rudy Molard (FRA) | Groupama–FDJ | + 4" |
| 5 | Lawson Craddock (USA) | Team BikeExchange–Jayco | + 4" |
| 6 | Nikias Arndt (GER) | Team DSM | + 4" |
| 7 | Victor Langellotti (MON) | Burgos BH | + 4" |
| 8 | Vadim Pronskiy (KAZ) | Astana Qazaqstan Team | + 4" |
| 9 | Gregor Mühlberger (AUT) | Movistar Team | + 4" |
| 10 | Roger Adrià (ESP) | Equipo Kern Pharma | + 4" |

General classification after stage 5
| Rank | Rider | Team | Time |
|---|---|---|---|
| 1 | Rudy Molard (FRA) | Groupama–FDJ | 16h 07' 22" |
| 2 | Fred Wright (GBR) | Team Bahrain Victorious | + 2" |
| 3 | Nikias Arndt (GER) | Team DSM | + 1' 09" |
| 4 | Lawson Craddock (USA) | Team BikeExchange–Jayco | + 2' 27" |
| 5 | Primož Roglič (SLO) | Team Jumbo–Visma | + 4' 09" |
| 6 | Sepp Kuss (USA) | Team Jumbo–Visma | + 4' 22" |
| 7 | Pavel Sivakov (FRA) | INEOS Grenadiers | + 4' 35" |
| 8 | Tao Geoghegan Hart (GBR) | INEOS Grenadiers | + 4' 35" |
| 9 | Remco Evenepoel (BEL) | Quick-Step Alpha Vinyl Team | + 4' 36" |
| 10 | Richard Carapaz (ECU) | INEOS Grenadiers | + 4' 42" |

== Stage 6 ==
25 August 2022 – Bilbao to Pico Jano (San Miguel de Aguayo), 181.2 km (112.6 mi)

The sixth stage featured the first summit finish of the race, with the riders finishing atop the climb of Pico Jano. After an undulating first few kilometers, the riders tackled the second-category climb of Puerto de Alisas after 69 kilometres (43 mi) of racing. Following the descent and a long flat section, the riders faced an uncategorized climb before riding on a short valley section. With 42 kilometres (26 mi) left, the riders went up the first-category Collada de Brenes, which is 6.8 kilometres (4.2 mi) long with an average of 8.2 percent. At the top, 35.4 kilometres (22.0 mi) from the finish, there were bonus seconds on offer to the first three riders across. After the descent and a short valley section, the riders passed through the intermediate sprint with 19.2 kilometres (11.9 mi) remaining. Shortly after, the riders tackled the final climb, the first-category Pico Jano. The climb is 12.6 kilometres (7.8 mi) long with an average of 6.6 percent, although there was a kilometer of flat section in the middle of the climb.

After around 10 kilometres (6.2 mi) of racing, a group of ten riders broke clear of the peloton to establish the day's breakaway. The best-placed GC rider in the break was Jan Bakelants (Intermarché–Wanty–Gobert Matériaux), who was 5' 02" down on Rudy Molard (Groupama–FDJ) at the start of the day. The break was allowed a maximum advantage of around five minutes, with Groupama–FDJ and Quick-Step Alpha Vinyl Team setting the pace in the peloton. On the first categorized climb, Rubén Fernández (Cofidis) took maximum KOM points. As the race headed towards the latter half of the stage, heavy rain began to treat the riders on the road. On the descent of an uncategorized climb, there was a crash that caused splits in the peloton but there was a regrouping ahead of the first-category climb of Collada de Brenes. Just before the climb, INEOS Grenadiers took over at the front of the peloton, shredding the break's lead to just around a minute and a half. On the climb, Mark Padun (EF Education–EasyPost) dropped his breakaway companions, soloing to a lead of almost a minute over Fernández and Fausto Masnada (Quick-Step Alpha Vinyl Team), the remaining survivors of the break. Meanwhile, the peloton crossed the top with a deficit of two minutes to Padun. At this point, the race leader, Molard, was dropped from the peloton.

On the descent, Padun saw his advantage drop to less than half a minute over Fernández and Masnada and just over a minute over the peloton. Ahead of the final climb to Pico Jano, the peloton swept up the two chasers, with Padun holding his advantage to just under a minute. At the start of the climb, there were some attacks from the peloton but the only successful move came from Jay Vine (Alpecin–Deceuninck), who began to eat into Padun's advantage. With 8.6 kilometres (5.3 mi) left, after an unsuccessful attack from Simon Yates (Team BikeExchange–Jayco), Remco Evenepoel (Quick-Step Alpha Vinyl Team) increased the pace. Initially, a select group of GC contenders followed his move but the Belgian gradually dropped everyone off his wheel apart from Enric Mas (Movistar Team), the only rider able to stay with Evenepoel. A chase group containing other GC contenders formed before Juan Ayuso (UAE Team Emirates) attacked in pursuit of the stage win. Meanwhile, up front, Vine caught Padun with 6.5 kilometres (4.0 mi) left before dropping him shortly after. His advantage over Evenepoel and Mas hovered around 20 seconds and despite Evenepoel's efforts to make the catch, Vine held off the chasers to take his first professional win. 15 seconds later, Evenepoel crossed the line in second, having gapped Mas by one second. Ayuso came home 55 seconds behind Vine while Primož Roglič (Team Jumbo–Visma) led the favorites' group home at 1' 37" down, having lost 1' 28" to Evenepoel after factoring in bonus seconds.

In terms of the GC, Evenepoel took control of the red jersey, becoming the sixth leader of the Vuelta in as many days. He led by 21 seconds over Molard and 28 seconds over Mas. After his time loss, Roglič was now just over a minute down on Evenepoel while Ayuso's ride propelled him to fifth on GC, 1' 12" behind.

Stage 6 result
| Rank | Rider | Team | Time |
|---|---|---|---|
| 1 | Jay Vine (AUS) | Alpecin–Deceuninck | 4h 38' 00" |
| 2 | Remco Evenepoel (BEL) | Quick-Step Alpha Vinyl Team | + 15" |
| 3 | Enric Mas (ESP) | Movistar Team | + 16" |
| 4 | Juan Ayuso (ESP) | UAE Team Emirates | + 55" |
| 5 | Primož Roglič (SLO) | Team Jumbo–Visma | + 1' 37" |
| 6 | Pavel Sivakov (FRA) | INEOS Grenadiers | + 1' 37" |
| 7 | Tao Geoghegan Hart (GBR) | INEOS Grenadiers | + 1' 37" |
| 8 | Jai Hindley (AUS) | Bora–Hansgrohe | + 1' 37" |
| 9 | Carlos Rodríguez (ESP) | INEOS Grenadiers | + 1' 37" |
| 10 | Simon Yates (GBR) | Team BikeExchange–Jayco | + 1' 37" |

General classification after stage 6
| Rank | Rider | Team | Time |
|---|---|---|---|
| 1 | Remco Evenepoel (BEL) | Quick-Step Alpha Vinyl Team | 20h 50' 07" |
| 2 | Rudy Molard (FRA) | Groupama–FDJ | + 21" |
| 3 | Enric Mas (ESP) | Movistar Team | + 28" |
| 4 | Primož Roglič (SLO) | Team Jumbo–Visma | + 1' 01" |
| 5 | Juan Ayuso (ESP) | UAE Team Emirates | + 1' 12" |
| 6 | Pavel Sivakov (FRA) | INEOS Grenadiers | + 1' 27" |
| 7 | Tao Geoghegan Hart (GBR) | INEOS Grenadiers | + 1' 27" |
| 8 | Carlos Rodríguez (ESP) | INEOS Grenadiers | + 1' 34" |
| 9 | Simon Yates (GBR) | Team BikeExchange–Jayco | + 1' 52" |
| 10 | João Almeida (POR) | UAE Team Emirates | + 1' 54" |

== Stage 7 ==
26 August 2022 – Camargo to Cistierna, 190 km (120 mi)

The seventh stage of the Vuelta featured a hilly parcours from Camargo to Cistierna. The first 70 kilometres (43 mi) had an undulating terrain before the riders gradually went uphill towards the foot of the first-category Puerto de San Glorio. The climb, which is 22.4 kilometres (13.9 mi) long with an average of 5.5 percent, was the only climb of the day, with the top being crested at 64.2 kilometres (39.9 mi) from the finish. Following a short descent, the rest of the stage was mostly flat. The intermediate sprint was located in Las Salas with 22 kilometres (14 mi) to go, with the sprint also offering bonus seconds to the first three riders across.

Shortly after the start of the stage, a group of six riders broke away from the peloton. The group contained Fred Wright (Team Bahrain Victorious), Samuele Battistella (Astana Qazaqstan Team), Jimmy Janssens (Alpecin–Deceuninck), Jesús Herrada (Cofidis), Harry Sweeny (Lotto–Soudal), and Omer Goldstein (Israel–Premier Tech). Despite some counterattacks from the peloton, no one was able to bridge up to the break. The lead sextet's advantage maxed out at around four minutes before the gap stabilized. As the riders climbed up the Puerto de San Glorio, Goldstein was dropped from the break. Meanwhile, in the peloton, Trek–Segafredo began to set a furious tempo in an attempt to drop the pure sprinters. They were successful in doing so, although Sam Bennett (Bora–Hansgrohe), the race's most successful sprinter thus far, found himself only around half a minute down on the peloton at the top. At this point, the break's advantage stood at just under three minutes.

On the descent, Bennett was able to return to the peloton. Team BikeExchange–Jayco, Arkéa–Samsic, Bora–Hansgrohe, and Trek–Segafredo took up the chase in the peloton but despite their best efforts, the break worked well together to maintain their advantage. Heading into the final 10 kilometres (6.2 mi), the break still held a lead of just over a minute. With around 5 kilometres (3.1 mi) left, the lead quintet's advantage was still around 50 seconds, almost ensuring that the break would stay away. Inside the final kilometer, Janssens briefly went to the front before Wright took over at the front. Wright started his sprint with around 300 metres (980 ft) left but he started to fade towards the end. Just before the finish, Battistella and Herrada went past Wright, with Herrada prevailing in the sprint to take his second Vuelta stage win. 29 seconds later, Bennett led the peloton across to increase his lead in the points classification. Remco Evenepoel (Quick-Step Alpha Vinyl Team) kept the red jersey as there were no changes in the top ten.

Stage 7 result
| Rank | Rider | Team | Time |
|---|---|---|---|
| 1 | Jesús Herrada (ESP) | Cofidis | 4h 30' 58" |
| 2 | Samuele Battistella (ITA) | Astana Qazaqstan Team | + 0" |
| 3 | Fred Wright (GBR) | Team Bahrain Victorious | + 0" |
| 4 | Jimmy Janssens (BEL) | Alpecin–Deceuninck | + 0" |
| 5 | Harry Sweeny (AUS) | Lotto–Soudal | + 0" |
| 6 | Sam Bennett (IRL) | Bora–Hansgrohe | + 29" |
| 7 | Jake Stewart (GBR) | Groupama–FDJ | + 29" |
| 8 | Kaden Groves (AUS) | Team BikeExchange–Jayco | + 29" |
| 9 | Mads Pedersen (DEN) | Trek–Segafredo | + 29" |
| 10 | Daniel McLay (GBR) | Arkéa–Samsic | + 29" |

General classification after stage 7
| Rank | Rider | Team | Time |
|---|---|---|---|
| 1 | Remco Evenepoel (BEL) | Quick-Step Alpha Vinyl Team | 25h 21' 34" |
| 2 | Rudy Molard (FRA) | Groupama–FDJ | + 21" |
| 3 | Enric Mas (ESP) | Movistar Team | + 28" |
| 4 | Primož Roglič (SLO) | Team Jumbo–Visma | + 1' 01" |
| 5 | Juan Ayuso (ESP) | UAE Team Emirates | + 1' 12" |
| 6 | Pavel Sivakov (FRA) | INEOS Grenadiers | + 1' 27" |
| 7 | Tao Geoghegan Hart (GBR) | INEOS Grenadiers | + 1' 27" |
| 8 | Carlos Rodríguez (ESP) | INEOS Grenadiers | + 1' 34" |
| 9 | Simon Yates (GBR) | Team BikeExchange–Jayco | + 1' 52" |
| 10 | João Almeida (POR) | UAE Team Emirates | + 1' 54" |

== Stage 8 ==
27 August 2022 – La Pola Llaviana to Colláu Fancuaya, 153.4 km (95.3 mi)

The Vuelta headed to its second mountaintop finish on the eighth stage with the riders finishing atop Colláu Fancuaya. Immediately from the get-go, the riders tackled the second-category Alto de la Colladona, giving the climbers the opportunity to get into the break. Following the descent and a long valley section, the riders went up the second-category Alto de la Mozqueta and the third-category Alto de Santo Emiliano in quick succession before another valley section succeeded these two climbs. Afterwards, the riders tackled the third-category climbs of Puerto de Tenebreo, where bonus seconds were on offer at the top, and Puerto de Perlavia before passing through the intermediate sprint in Grado/Grau with 26 kilometres (16 mi) left. Afterwards, the riders gradually climbed towards the foot of the final climb, the first-category Colláu Fancuaya, a 10.1-kilometre (6.3 mi) climb with an average of 8.5 percent, for another summit finish.

Following the start of the stage, the first rider to make his move was Alexey Lutsenko (Astana Qazaqstan Team). More riders gradually made their way towards him on the first climb, including Richard Carapaz (INEOS Grenadiers). Quick-Step Alpha Vinyl Team slowly brought the break back towards the top of the climb. At the top, Jay Vine (Alpecin–Deceuninck) attacked from the initial break to take maximum KOM points while Marc Soler (UAE Team Emirates) followed behind him. On the descent, both riders maintained their gap over the peloton before eight more riders joined the duo to establish the break of the day. The best-placed GC rider in the break was Mikel Landa (Team Bahrain Victorious), who was 6' 33" down on Remco Evenepoel (Quick-Step Alpha Vinyl Team) at the start of the day. The break was allowed to gain an advantage of around four minutes, with Quick-Step Alpha Vinyl Team controlling the peloton. On each of the next four climbs, Vine took maximum KOM points to take the lead in the mountain classification. As the break made their way past the intermediate sprint, Mads Pedersen (Trek–Segafredo) took maximum points to take over the lead in the points classification before he dropped back from the break.

On the final climb to Colláu Fancuaya, the break's advantage stood at around three minutes. With 6.2 kilometres (3.9 mi) left, Vine increased the pace before gradually dropping his breakaway companions off his wheel. Thibaut Pinot (Groupama–FDJ), Rein Taaramäe (Intermarché–Wanty–Gobert Matériaux), and Soler emerged as the strongest chasers but Vine continued to increase his lead. Towards the finish, Soler dropped Pinot and Taaramae but Vine held off the chasers to win his second stage of the Vuelta. Soler was caught by Taaramae at the line but he held on for second. Meanwhile, in the peloton, Quick-Step Alpha Vinyl Team continued to lead the peloton until Evenepoel lifted the pace. Only Enric Mas (Movistar Team), Primož Roglič (Team Jumbo–Visma), and Carlos Rodríguez (INEOS Grenadiers) were able to follow him, with Simon Yates (Team BikeExchange–Jayco) following closely behind them. Towards the top, the other contenders gradually lost time to the Evenepoel group, which went past the remnants of the break. Evenepoel, Mas, and Roglič eventually crossed the line at 1' 20" down while Rodríguez was dropped and caught by Yates, with the duo losing 13 seconds. Tao Geoghegan Hart (INEOS Grenadiers) lost 27 seconds while the UAE Team Emirates duo of João Almeida and Juan Ayuso as well as Ben O'Connor (AG2R Citroën Team) finished 50 seconds behind Evenepoel. The winner of this year's Giro, Jai Hindley (Bora–Hansgrohe), finished 56 seconds behind while Pavel Sivakov (INEOS Grenadiers) was among the biggest losers after losing more than two minutes.

In the GC, Evenepoel maintained his advantage over Mas and Roglič in second and third, respectively. Rodríguez and Geoghegan Hart rounded out the top five at almost two minutes down. Ayuso, Yates, Almeida, Hindley, and O'Connor comprised the bottom half of the top ten, each with a deficit of two to three minutes to Evenepoel.

Stage 8 result
| Rank | Rider | Team | Time |
|---|---|---|---|
| 1 | Jay Vine (AUS) | Alpecin–Deceuninck | 4h 05' 25" |
| 2 | Marc Soler (ESP) | UAE Team Emirates | + 43" |
| 3 | Rein Taaramäe (EST) | Intermarché–Wanty–Gobert Matériaux | + 43" |
| 4 | Thibaut Pinot (FRA) | Groupama–FDJ | + 47" |
| 5 | Remco Evenepoel (BEL) | Quick-Step Alpha Vinyl Team | + 1' 20" |
| 6 | Enric Mas (ESP) | Movistar Team | + 1' 20" |
| 7 | Primož Roglič (SLO) | Team Jumbo–Visma | + 1' 20" |
| 8 | Simon Yates (GBR) | Team BikeExchange–Jayco | + 1' 33" |
| 9 | Carlos Rodríguez (ESP) | INEOS Grenadiers | + 1' 33" |
| 10 | Sebastien Reichenbach (SUI) | Groupama–FDJ | + 1' 42" |

General classification after stage 8
| Rank | Rider | Team | Time |
|---|---|---|---|
| 1 | Remco Evenepoel (BEL) | Quick-Step Alpha Vinyl Team | 29h 28' 19" |
| 2 | Enric Mas (ESP) | Movistar Team | + 28" |
| 3 | Primož Roglič (SLO) | Team Jumbo–Visma | + 1' 01" |
| 4 | Carlos Rodríguez (ESP) | INEOS Grenadiers | + 1' 47" |
| 5 | Tao Geoghegan Hart (GBR) | INEOS Grenadiers | + 1' 54" |
| 6 | Juan Ayuso (ESP) | UAE Team Emirates | + 2' 02" |
| 7 | Simon Yates (GBR) | Team BikeExchange–Jayco | + 2' 05" |
| 8 | João Almeida (POR) | UAE Team Emirates | + 2' 44" |
| 9 | Jai Hindley (AUS) | Bora–Hansgrohe | + 2' 51" |
| 10 | Ben O'Connor (AUS) | AG2R Citroën Team | + 2' 59" |

== Stage 9 ==
28 August 2022 – Villaviciosa to Les Praeres, 171.4 km (106.5 mi)

The last stage before the second rest day featured another mountaintop finish as the riders headed towards the climb of Les Praeres. The climb last featured in the Vuelta in 2018, when Simon Yates won the stage en route to his Vuelta victory. The first 48 kilometres (30 mi) had an undulating terrain before the riders climbed up the second-category Alto del Torno. Following a gradual descent, the riders went up the first-category Mirador del Fito before the descent and a short flat section. With around 60.4 kilometres (37.5 mi) to go, the riders tackled the third-category Alto de la Llama. A plateau section and the descent led to the intermediate sprint in Villaviciosa with 33.4 kilometres (20.8 mi) left. Shortly afterwards, the riders climbed up the third-category La Campa, with bonus seconds on offer at the top. A short, undulating section led the riders to the foot of the final climb, the first-category Les Praeres. The climb is 3.9 kilometres (2.4 mi) long with an average of 12.9 percent, with gradients maxing out at 24 percent near the top.

The start of the stage was marked by a furious fight for the break, with several riders trying to get into the move. After 42 kilometres (26 mi), a break finally went clear, initially consisting of ten riders. However, Thymen Arensman (Team DSM), who was only 3' 18" down on GC, opted to wait for the peloton. This meant that Louis Meintjes (Intermarché–Wanty–Gobert Matériaux), at 8' 28" down, was the best-placed rider in the break. The lead group led by as much as five and a half minutes as Quick-Step Alpha Vinyl Team controlled the peloton. After the break formed, Marc Soler (UAE Team Emirates), Jay Vine (Alpecin–Deceuninck), and Santiago Buitrago (Team Bahrain Victorious) tried to bridge up to the break but they were chased down by the peloton. On each of the first four categorized climbs, the Alpecin–Deceuninck duo of Robert Stannard and Jimmy Janssens took the maximum KOM points to take away points from Vine's possible rivals for the mountain classification. Ahead of the final climb, there were attacks in the break before Janssens and Samuele Battistella (Astana Qazaqstan Team) got a gap over their breakaway companions. As they reached the foot of Les Praeres, the break still held a lead of almost four minutes over the peloton.

On the climb, Janssens gapped Battistella by a few meters before the latter began to claw his way back. Meanwhile, Meintjes managed to drop his fellow chasers before catching up to the lead duo. Meintjes immediately dropped both Janssens and Batistella before gradually increasing his lead towards the top to win the stage, taking his first win at World Tour level. Battistella finished second at more than a minute down while Edoardo Zambanini (Team Bahrain Victorious) took third. In the peloton, Quick-Step Alpha Vinyl Team led the group onto the climb, setting a furious pace that split the group. At the bottom of the climb, Juan Ayuso (UAE Team Emirates) launched an attack, with Remco Evenepoel (Quick-Step Alpha Vinyl Team), Enric Mas (Movistar Team), and Primož Roglič (Team Jumbo–Visma) the only ones able to follow. Eventually, Evenepoel moved to the front before dropping his GC rivals off his wheel. He gradually increased his lead towards the top while a chase group consisting of Mas, Ayuso, and Carlos Rodríguez (INEOS Grenadiers) formed, with Roglič a bit further behind. Evenepoel eventually finished 1' 34" down on Meintjes while Ayuso distanced Mas and Rodríguez to finish 34 seconds down on the race leader. Mas, Rodríguez, and Roglič lost between 44 and 52 seconds while the other contenders lost between one and four minutes.

In terms of the GC, Evenepoel strengthened his hold on the red jersey, extending his lead to more than a minute over Mas. Roglič sat in third at almost two minutes behind. Rodríguez and Ayuso rounded out the top five at more than two and a half minutes down, separated by only three seconds. Yates, João Almeida (UAE Team Emirates), Miguel Ángel López (Astana Qazaqstan Team), Jai Hindley (Bora–Hansgrohe), and Pavel Sivakov (INEOS Grenadiers) rounded out the top ten, sitting between three and five and a half minutes down.

Stage 9 result
| Rank | Rider | Team | Time |
|---|---|---|---|
| 1 | Louis Meintjes (RSA) | Intermarché–Wanty–Gobert Matériaux | 4h 32' 39" |
| 2 | Samuele Battistella (ITA) | Astana Qazaqstan Team | + 1' 01" |
| 3 | Edoardo Zambanini (ITA) | Team Bahrain Victorious | + 1' 14" |
| 4 | Remco Evenepoel (BEL) | Quick-Step Alpha Vinyl Team | + 1' 34" |
| 5 | Filippo Conca (ITA) | Lotto–Soudal | + 1' 58" |
| 6 | Juan Ayuso (ESP) | UAE Team Emirates | + 2' 08" |
| 7 | Simon Guglielmi (FRA) | Arkéa–Samsic | + 2' 08" |
| 8 | Enric Mas (ESP) | Movistar Team | + 2' 18" |
| 9 | Carlos Rodríguez (ESP) | INEOS Grenadiers | + 2' 20" |
| 10 | Primož Roglič (SLO) | Team Jumbo–Visma | + 2' 26" |

General classification after stage 9
| Rank | Rider | Team | Time |
|---|---|---|---|
| 1 | Remco Evenepoel (BEL) | Quick-Step Alpha Vinyl Team | 34h 02' 32" |
| 2 | Enric Mas (ESP) | Movistar Team | + 1' 12" |
| 3 | Primož Roglič (SLO) | Team Jumbo–Visma | + 1' 53" |
| 4 | Carlos Rodríguez (ESP) | INEOS Grenadiers | + 2' 33" |
| 5 | Juan Ayuso (ESP) | UAE Team Emirates | + 2' 36" |
| 6 | Simon Yates (GBR) | Team BikeExchange–Jayco | + 3' 08" |
| 7 | João Almeida (POR) | UAE Team Emirates | + 4' 32" |
| 8 | Miguel Ángel López (COL) | Astana Qazaqstan Team | + 5' 03" |
| 9 | Jai Hindley (AUS) | Bora–Hansgrohe | + 5' 36" |
| 10 | Pavel Sivakov (FRA) | INEOS Grenadiers | + 5' 39" |

== Rest day 2 ==
29 August 2022 – Alicante

== Stage 10 ==
30 August 2022 – Elche to Alicante, 30.9 km (19.2 mi) (ITT)

Following the second rest day, the race returned with its only individual time trial as the riders tackled a 30.9-kilometre (19.2 mi) parcours from Elche to Alicante. Almost the entirety of the course was flat, apart from a small lump towards the end of the course. There were two intermediate time checks located after 10.4 kilometres (6.5 mi) and 21 kilometres (13 mi) of racing.

As is customary for individual time trials, the riders set off in reverse order of their GC placings. Floris De Tier (Alpecin–Deceuninck) was supposed to be the first rider off the start ramp but he withdrew due to saddle sores. Seven other riders did not start the stage, most of them due to COVID-19 positive tests. The first rider off the start ramp was Boy van Poppel (Intermarché–Wanty–Gobert Matériaux). Multiple riders such as Alex Kirsch (Trek–Segafredo), and the Team BikeExchange–Jayco duo of Kelland O'Brien and Michael Hepburn set the initial benchmark times until Rémi Cavagna (Quick-Step Alpha Vinyl Team) set a blistering time at the finish. He took the fastest times at both time checks before setting a time of 34' 18". No rider came close to challenging his time until the GC contenders began to roll down the ramp. Among the riders just outside the top ten on GC, Tao Geoghegan Hart (INEOS Grenadiers) and Ben O'Connor (AG2R Citroën Team) set times of 35' 04" and 35' 11", respectively. Both times were good for eighth and twelfth, respectively.

The top ten GC riders soon began to start their time trials. Pavel Sivakov (INEOS Grenadiers), who was tenth on GC, set a time of 34' 45", the fifth-fastest time on the day while Miguel Ángel López (Astana Qazaqstan Team), despite not being known for him time-trial capabilities, finished with the ninth-best time of 35' 05". Meanwhile, Jai Hindley (Bora–Hansgrohe) suffered in the time trial after setting a time of 37' 06", dropping him out of the top ten as a result. For the UAE Team Emirates duo of João Almeida and Juan Ayuso, they set times of 35' 31" and 35' 35", respectively, which were good for top 20 on the day. Almeida's ride did not come without an issue, however, as he took a wrong turn in the final few hundred meters, costing him some time. Simon Yates (Team BikeExchange–Jayco) set the seventh-best time of 35' 00" while Carlos Rodríguez (INEOS Grenadiers) set an impressive time of 34' 40", the fourth-fastest time of the day.

The focus soon shifted to the podium contenders. Primož Roglič (Team Jumbo–Visma) was just under a second down on Cavagna on both time checks before edging the Frenchman at the finish after he set a time of 34' 06". Enric Mas (Movistar Team) was able to limit his losses on the time checks but he struggled towards the finish. His time of 35' 09" was still good for tenth on the day. The last rider down the start ramp was Remco Evenepoel (Quick-Step Alpha Vinyl Team), the race leader. He dominated both time checks before finishing with a time of 33' 18", 48 seconds clear of Roglič. As a result, Evenepoel took his first Grand Tour stage win.

In the GC, Evenepoel extended his lead to 2' 41" over Roglič, who moved up to second while Mas dropped to third at 3' 03" down on the Belgian. Rodríguez kept fourth, but he was now almost four minutes down while Yates moved up to fifth, almost five minutes behind Evenepoel. Ayuso, Almeida, López, and Sivakov occupied the next four spots while Geoghegan Hart moved inside the top ten.

Stage 10 result
| Rank | Rider | Team | Time |
|---|---|---|---|
| 1 | Remco Evenepoel (BEL) | Quick-Step Alpha Vinyl Team | 33' 18" |
| 2 | Primož Roglič (SLO) | Team Jumbo–Visma | + 48" |
| 3 | Remi Cavagna (FRA) | Quick-Step Alpha Vinyl Team | + 1' 00" |
| 4 | Carlos Rodríguez (ESP) | INEOS Grenadiers | + 1' 22" |
| 5 | Pavel Sivakov (FRA) | INEOS Grenadiers | + 1' 27" |
| 6 | Lawson Craddock (USA) | Team BikeExchange–Jayco | + 1' 37" |
| 7 | Simon Yates (GBR) | Team BikeExchange–Jayco | + 1' 42" |
| 8 | Tao Geoghegan Hart (GBR) | INEOS Grenadiers | + 1' 46" |
| 9 | Miguel Ángel López (COL) | Astana Qazaqstan Team | + 1' 47" |
| 10 | Enric Mas (ESP) | Movistar Team | + 1' 51" |

General classification after stage 10
| Rank | Rider | Team | Time |
|---|---|---|---|
| 1 | Remco Evenepoel (BEL) | Quick-Step Alpha Vinyl Team | 34h 35' 50" |
| 2 | Primož Roglič (SLO) | Team Jumbo–Visma | + 2' 41" |
| 3 | Enric Mas (ESP) | Movistar Team | + 3' 03" |
| 4 | Carlos Rodríguez (ESP) | INEOS Grenadiers | + 3' 55" |
| 5 | Simon Yates (GBR) | Team BikeExchange–Jayco | + 4' 50" |
| 6 | Juan Ayuso (ESP) | UAE Team Emirates | + 4' 53" |
| 7 | João Almeida (POR) | UAE Team Emirates | + 6' 45" |
| 8 | Miguel Ángel López (COL) | Astana Qazaqstan Team | + 6' 50" |
| 9 | Pavel Sivakov (FRA) | INEOS Grenadiers | + 7' 06" |
| 10 | Tao Geoghegan Hart (GBR) | INEOS Grenadiers | + 7' 37" |

== Stage 11 ==
31 August 2022 – ElPozo Alimentación to Cabo de Gata, 191.2 km (118.8 mi)

The eleventh stage featured an opportunity for the sprinters as the riders faced a 191.2-kilometre (118.8 mi) parcours from ElPozo Alimentación to Cabo de Gata. There were no categorized climb on the route although the second half of the stage had an undulating terrain. 10.2 kilometres (6.3 mi) from the finish, the riders passed through the intermediate sprint, which also offered bonus seconds. Afterwards, the rest of the stage was entirely flat.

Before the stage started, it was announced that Simon Yates (Team BikeExchange–Jayco) and Pavel Sivakov (INEOS Grenadiers), two riders in the top ten on GC, had to withdraw from the race after testing positive for COVID-19. Three riders from Equipo Kern Pharma also had to withdraw due to the same issue. Immediately at the start, Vojtěch Řepa (Equipo Kern Pharma), Joan Bou (Euskaltel–Euskadi), and Jetse Bol (Burgos BH) escaped from the peloton to form the day's breakaway. Their advantage maxed out at around two minutes as the sprinters' teams kept them in check. With around 64 kilometres (40 mi) to go, Řepa crashed in the break but he quickly made it back to the front group. At around the same time, Julian Alaphilippe (Quick-Step Alpha Vinyl Team) slid down in the peloton. He was unable to continue the race and it was eventually revealed that he had a dislocated shoulder. 52 kilometres (32 mi) from the finish, Bol attacked his breakaway companions, going solo off the front. Řepa and Bou were eventually caught by the peloton while Bol continued to stay ahead.

With 26 kilometres (16 mi) left, Bol was finally caught by the peloton. After the catch was made, the peloton slowly made their way towards the finish as no team set the pace at the front. At the intermediate sprint, Mads Pedersen (Trek–Segafredo) took the maximum points uncontested to increase his lead in the points classification. The bunch soon headed towards an inevitable sprint, with Team BikeExchange–Jayco leading the peloton into the final kilometer. John Degenkolb (Team DSM) started his sprint first before Sebastian Molano (UAE Team Emirates) made his way to the front. However, Kaden Groves (Team BikeExchange–Jayco) timed his sprint perfectly to win his first Grand Tour stage. Danny van Poppel (Bora–Hansgrohe) and Tim Merlier (Alpecin–Deceuninck) made late surges to finish second and third, respectively. In the GC, the only changes at the top were Ben O'Connor (AG2R Citroën Team) and Thymen Arensman (Team DSM) entering the top ten after Yates' and Sivakov's withdrawals.

Stage 11 result
| Rank | Rider | Team | Time |
|---|---|---|---|
| 1 | Kaden Groves (AUS) | Team BikeExchange–Jayco | 5h 03' 14" |
| 2 | Danny van Poppel (NED) | Bora–Hansgrohe | + 0" |
| 3 | Tim Merlier (BEL) | Alpecin–Deceuninck | + 0" |
| 4 | Sebastian Molano (COL) | UAE Team Emirates | + 0" |
| 5 | Mads Pedersen (DEN) | Trek–Segafredo | + 0" |
| 6 | Daniel McLay (GBR) | Arkéa–Samsic | + 0" |
| 7 | John Degenkolb (GER) | Team DSM | + 0" |
| 8 | Fred Wright (GBR) | Team Bahrain Victorious | + 0" |
| 9 | Cédric Beullens (BEL) | Lotto–Soudal | + 0" |
| 10 | Boy van Poppel (NED) | Intermarché–Wanty–Gobert Matériaux | + 0" |

General classification after stage 11
| Rank | Rider | Team | Time |
|---|---|---|---|
| 1 | Remco Evenepoel (BEL) | Quick-Step Alpha Vinyl Team | 39h 39' 04" |
| 2 | Primož Roglič (SLO) | Team Jumbo–Visma | + 2' 41" |
| 3 | Enric Mas (ESP) | Movistar Team | + 3' 03" |
| 4 | Carlos Rodríguez (ESP) | INEOS Grenadiers | + 3' 55" |
| 5 | Juan Ayuso (ESP) | UAE Team Emirates | + 4' 53" |
| 6 | João Almeida (POR) | UAE Team Emirates | + 6' 45" |
| 7 | Miguel Ángel López (COL) | Astana Qazaqstan Team | + 6' 50" |
| 8 | Tao Geoghegan Hart (GBR) | INEOS Grenadiers | + 7' 37" |
| 9 | Ben O'Connor (AUS) | AG2R Citroën Team | + 7' 46" |
| 10 | Thymen Arensman (NED) | Team DSM | + 8' 44" |
