= Pico Jano =

Mountain in Spain

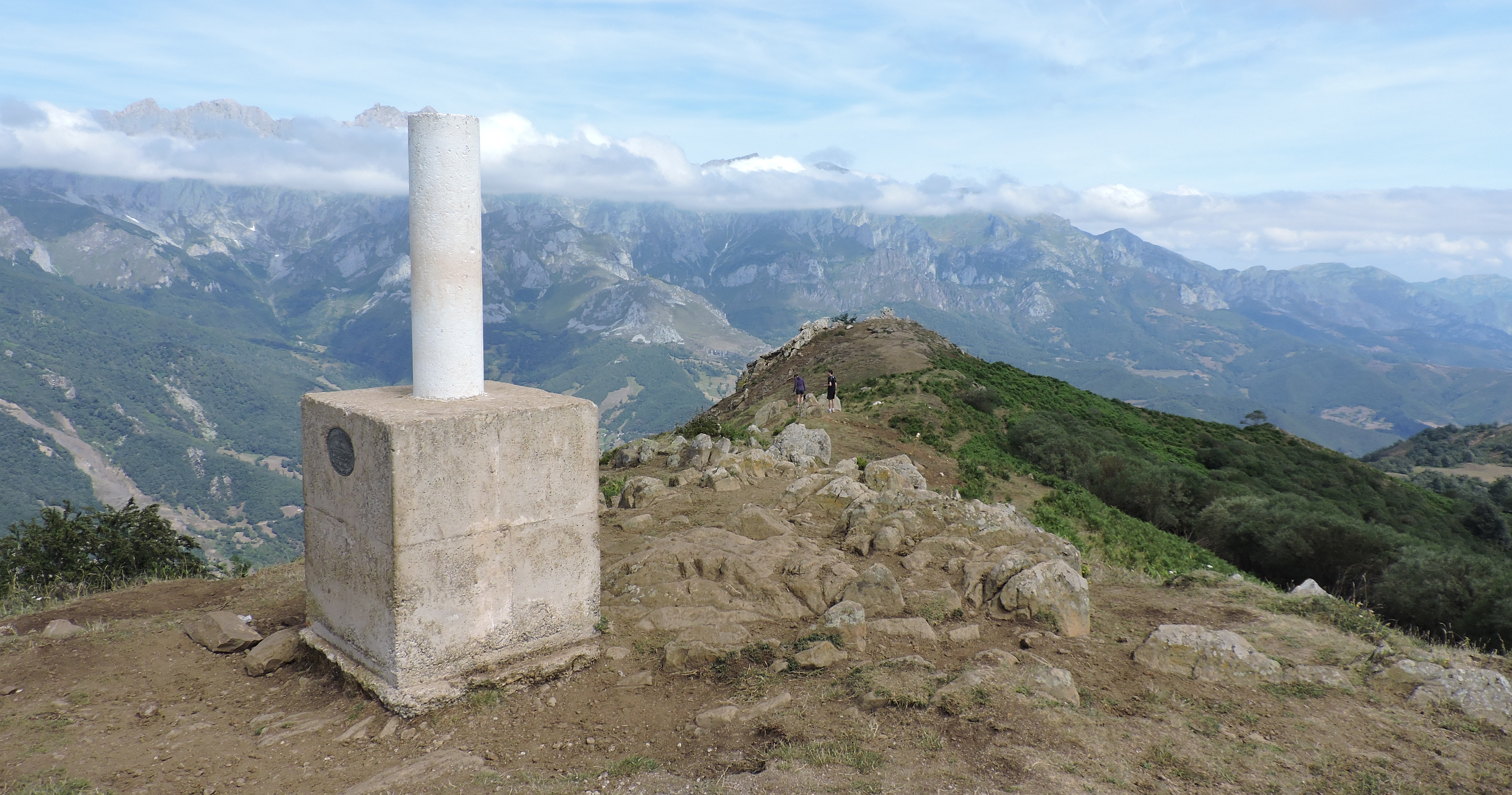
- Trig point on the summit

Highest point
- Elevation: 1,446 m (4,744 ft)
- Prominence: 350 m (1,150 ft)
- Isolation: 8.39 km (5.21 mi)
- Coordinates: 43°07′00″N 4°42′01″W

Geography
- Location within Spain
- Location: Cantabria, Spain
- Parent range: Cantabrian Mountains

Climbing
- Easiest route: footpath from Dobarganes

Pico Jano is a mountain of Cantabria (northern Spain).

== Geography ==
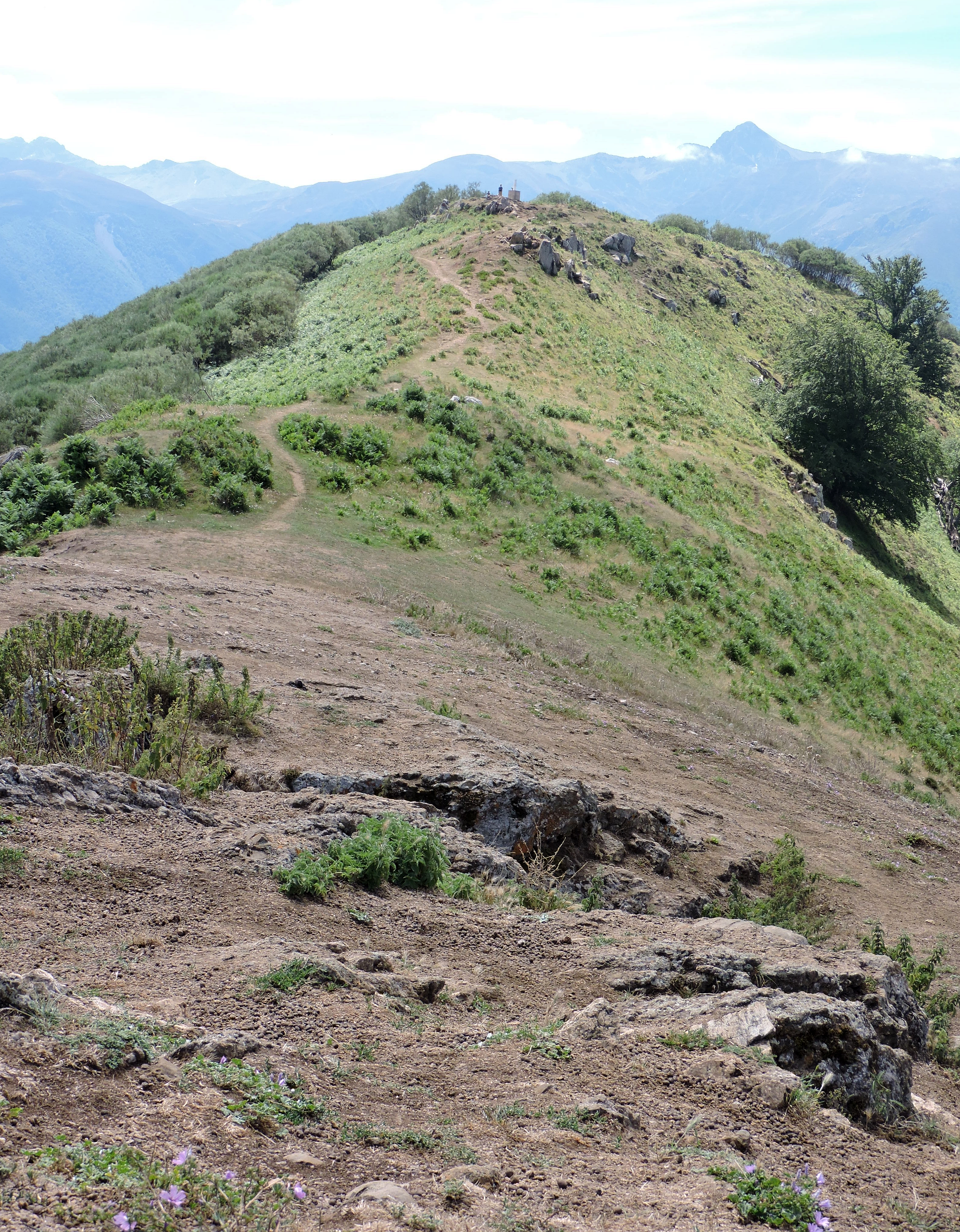
NW view of the mountain

The mountain is part of the range dividing the valleys of rivers Deva and Quiviesa. Located between the municipalities of Camaleño and Vega de Liébana, both in Liébana, its highest point is occupied by a pillar used as trig point, whose base is at 1,446-metre (4,744 ft) m. The mountain must not be confused with another Pico Jano close to Bárcena de Pie de Concha (1,289.7-metre (4,231 ft)).

== Access to the summit ==
An easy and well waymarked route to Pico Jano starts from Dobarganes, a village of Vega de Liébana municipality. Its length is about 4 km. The summit can also be reached by mountain bike. Pico Jano offers views of Picos de Europa.
