= Piornal =

Piornal, Spain
- municipality
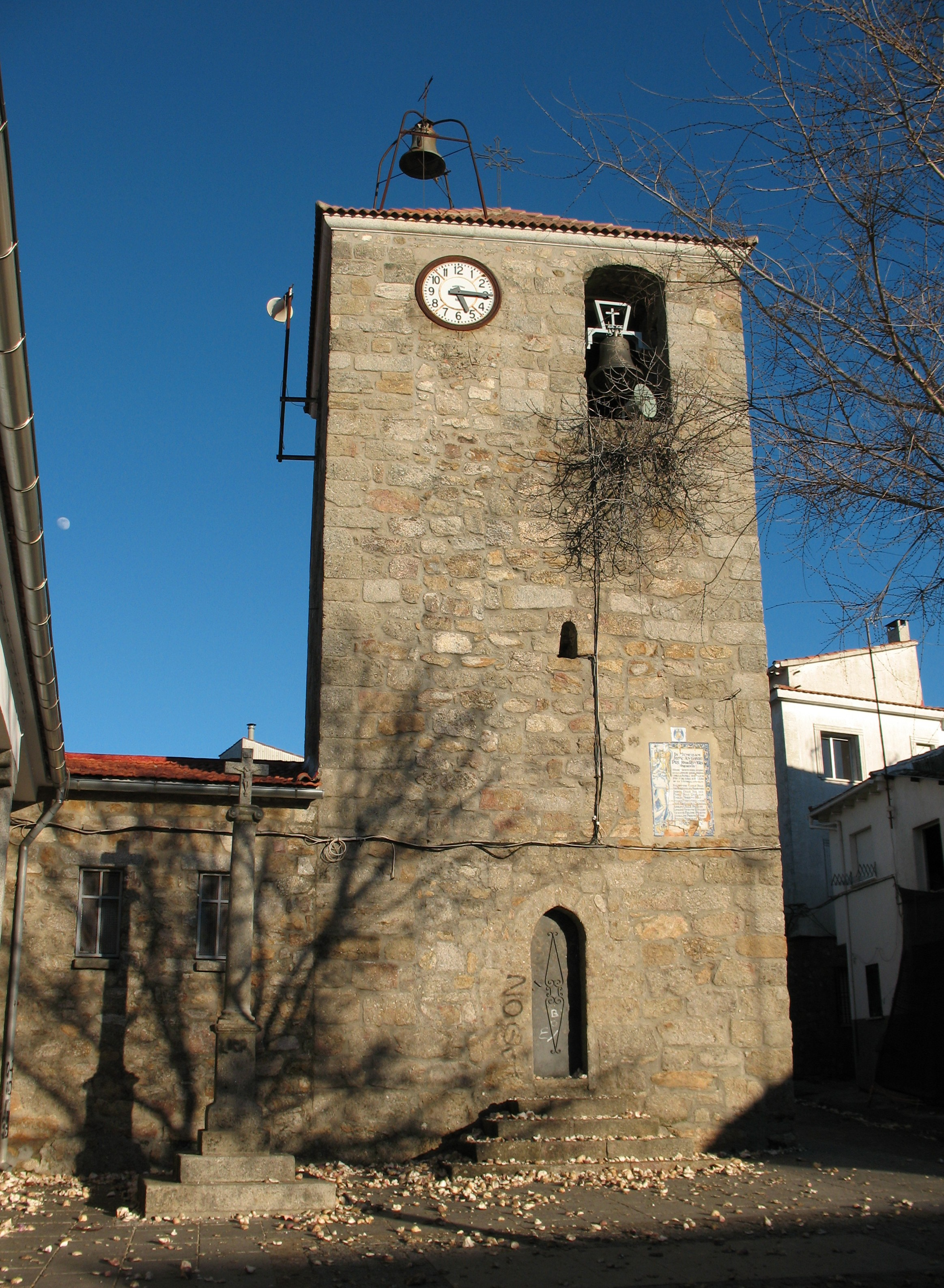
- Church of San Juan in the town of Piornal from Cáceres

- Flag Coat of arms
- Interactive map of Piornal, Spain
- Coordinates: 40°07′N 5°50′W
- Country: Spain
- Autonomous community: Extremadura
- Province: Cáceres
- Municipality: Piornal

Area
  - Total: 36 km^{2} (14 sq mi)
- Elevation: 1,175 m (3,855 ft)

Population (2025-01-01)
  - Total: 1,443
  - Density: 40/km^{2} (100/sq mi)
- Time zone: UTC+1 (CET)
  - Summer (DST): UTC+2 (CEST)

Piornal (Spanish pronunciation: [pjoɾˈnal]) is a municipality located in the province of Cáceres, Extremadura, Spain. According to the 2005 census (INE), the municipality has a population of 1532 inhabitants.

== See also ==
- List of municipalities in Cáceres
