= Ibai Azurmendi =

Spanish road bicycle racer

Personal information
- Full name: Ibai Azurmendi Sagastibeltza
- Born: 11 June 1996 (age 30) Leitza, Spain

Cycling career
- Sport: Cycling
- Current team: Euskaltel–Euskadi
- Discipline: Road
- Role: Rider

Amateur team
- 2015–2017: Fundación Euskadi–EDP

Professional team
- 2018–: Fundación Euskadi

Ibai Azurmendi Sagastibeltza (born 11 June 1996) is a Spanish cyclist who currently rides for UCI ProTeam Euskaltel–Euskadi.

== Major results ==
=== Grand Tour general classification results timeline ===
Grand Tour	2022
Giro d'Italia	—
Tour de France	—
Vuelta a España	86

Legend
—	Did not compete
DNF	Did not finish
