= Filippo Conca =

Italian cyclist (born 1998)

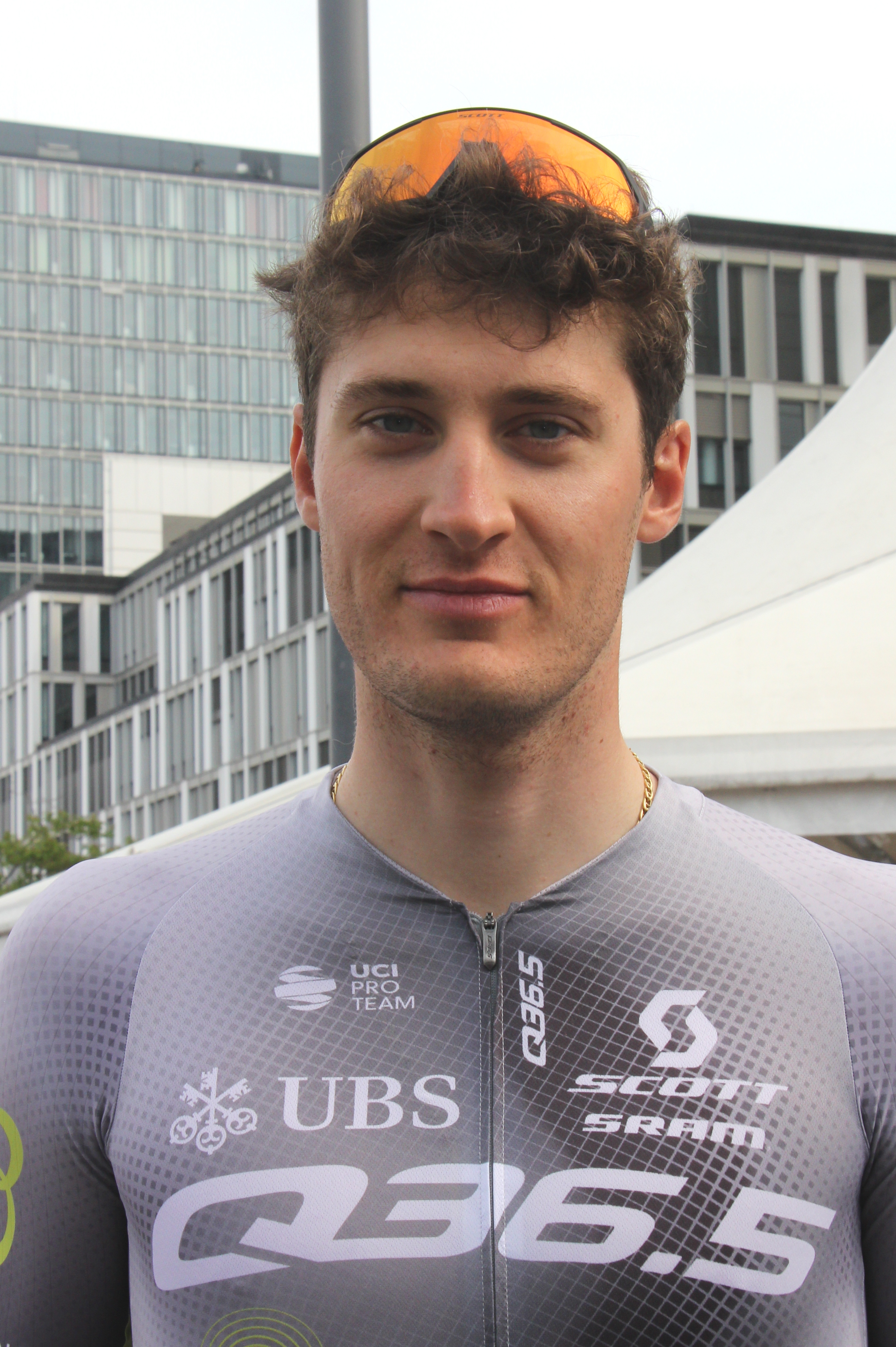
- Conca in 2023

Personal information
- Born: 22 September 1998 (age 28) Lecco, Italy
- Height: 1.9 m (6 ft 3 in)
- Weight: 71 kg (157 lb)

Cycling career
- Sport: Cycling
- Current team: Team Jayco–AlUla
- Discipline: Road
- Role: Rider

Amateur teams
- 2017: Palazzago–Pala Fenice Franchini
- 2018: Palazzago–Alé Cipollini
- 2025: Swatt Club

Professional teams
- 2019–2020: Biesse–Carrera
- 2021–2022: Lotto–Soudal
- 2023–2024: Q36.5 Pro Cycling Team
- 2025–: Team Jayco–AlUla

Major wins
- One-day races and Classics National Road Race Championships (2025)

Filippo Conca (born 22 September 1998 in Lecco) is an Italian cyclist, who currently rides for UCI WorldTeam Team Jayco–AlUla. He was the 2025 Italian National Road Race champion.

== Professional career ==
=== Biesse Arvedi (2019–20) ===
In 2019, Conca turned professional with Biesse Arvedi, a Continental Team. He immediately impressed, finishing 5th overall at the 2019 Giro Ciclistico d'Italia ("Baby Giro"). The following season, he repeated his placing at the Baby Giro.

=== Lotto–Soudal (2021–22) ===
Conca stepped up to the UCI World Tour in 2021 with Lotto Soudal. In his debut race at the Tour de la Provence, he captured the mountains classification. He made his first Grand Tour appearance at the 2022 Vuelta a España, where he secured a top-5 finish in stage 9, but later withdrew during stage 17, due to contracting COVID-19.

=== Q36.5 (2023–24) ===
In 2023, Conca signed with Q36.5 Pro Cycling Team. Despite competing in major races – including Milan-San Remo – he was unable to secure victories. Notably, he placed 9th in the 2024 Coppa Agostoni. After two seasons, his contract was not renewed, leaving him without a pro team for 2025.

=== SWATT Club (2025) ===
Facing limited professional opportunities, Conca joined the SWATT Club, an Italian amateur team, for 2025. The team is known for offering cyclists a fresh start, combining road and gravel racing.

On 29 June 2025, Conca made a dramatic comeback by winning the elite men's road race at the Italian Championships. He out-sprinted Alessandro Covi and Thomas Pesenti from a decisive breakaway. His victory was widely regarded as one of the most surprising national titles of the season. In post-race interviews, Conca reflected that without SWATT Club, he might have retired in late 2024.

=== Team Jayco–AlUla (2025–) ===
In August 2025, Conca signed a professional contract with Team Jayco–AlUla until 2027, thus returning to the World Tour circuit.

== Major results ==
2018
4th Trofeo Alcide Degasperi
2019
5th Overall Giro Ciclistico d'Italia
7th Overall Giro della Valle d'Aosta
9th Gran Premio Sportivi di Poggiana
2020
5th Overall Giro Ciclistico d'Italia
10th Trofeo Laigueglia
2021
1st Mountains classification, Tour de la Provence
2024
9th Coppa Agostoni
2025 (1 pro win)
1st Road race, National Road Championships

=== Grand Tour general classification results timeline ===
Grand Tour	2022
Giro d'Italia	—
Tour de France	—
Vuelta a España	DNF

Legend
—	Did not compete
DNF	Did not finish
