= Ander Okamika =

Spanish cyclist

Personal information
- Full name: Ander Okamika Bengoetxea
- Born: 2 April 1993 (age 33) Lekeitio, Spain
- Height: 1.89 m (6 ft 2 in)
- Weight: 72 kg (159 lb)

Cycling career
- Sport: Cycling
- Current team: Burgos Burpellet BH
- Discipline: Road
- Role: Rider

Amateur team
- 2020: Netllar Telecom–Alé

Professional team
- 2021–: Burgos BH

Ander Okamika Bengoetxea (born 2 April 1993) is a Spanish road cyclist and former triathlete, who currently rides for UCI ProTeam Burgos Burpellet BH.

== Major results ==
2020
National Amateur Road Championships

1st Time trial
2nd Road race

1st Stage 1 Vuelta a Alicante
2021
9th Coppa Sabatini
10th Classic Loire Atlantique
2022
Combativity award Stage 19 Vuelta a España
2023
1st Stage 1 (TTT) GP Beiras e Serra da Estrela
7th Overall Tour of Turkey
Vuelta a España

Combativity award Stages 4 & 7

2024
10th Overall Tour of Qinghai Lake
2025
5th Road race, National Road Championships

=== Grand Tour general classification results timeline ===
Grand Tour	2021	2022	2023
Giro d'Italia	—	—	—
Tour de France	—	—	—
Vuelta a España	75	96	62

Legend
—	Did not compete
DNF	Did not finish
