= 2023 Vuelta a Andalucía =

Spanish cycling race

2023 UCI ProSeries

Race details
- Dates: 15–19 February 2023
- Stages: 5
- Distance: 845.2 km (525.2 mi)
- Winning time: 21h 05' 02"

Results
Jersey awarded to the overall winner	Winner	Tadej Pogačar (SLO)	(UAE Team Emirates)
	Second	Mikel Landa (ESP)	(Team Bahrain Victorious)
	Third	Santiago Buitrago (COL)	(Team Bahrain Victorious)
Jersey awarded to the points classification winner	Points	Tadej Pogačar (SLO)	(UAE Team Emirates)
Jersey awarded to the mountains classification winner	Mountains	Gotzon Martín (ESP)	(Eolo–Kometa)
	Combination	Tadej Pogačar (SLO)	(UAE Team Emirates)
Jersey awarded to the sprints classification winner	Sprints	Aaron Van Poucke (BEL)	(Team Flanders–Baloise)
	Team	(United Kingdom) Ineos Grenadiers	

The 2023 Vuelta a Andalucía Ruta del Sol (English: Tour of Andalucia Route of the Sun) was a road cycling stage race that took place between 15 and 19 February 2023 in the autonomous community of Andalusia in southern Spain. The race was rated as a category 2.Pro event on the 2023 UCI ProSeries calendar, and was the 69th edition of the Vuelta a Andalucía.

== Teams ==
10 of the 18 UCI WorldTeams and eight UCI ProTeams made up the 18 teams that participated in the race.

UCI WorldTeams

- Alpecin–Deceuninck
- Astana Qazaqstan Team
- Ineos Grenadiers
- Intermarché–Circus–Wanty
- Lotto–Dstny
- Movistar Team
- Team Bahrain Victorious
- Team Jayco–AlUla
- UAE Team Emirates

UCI ProTeams

- Burgos BH
- Caja Rural–Seguros RGA
- Eolo–Kometa
- Equipo Kern Pharma
- Euskaltel–Euskadi
- Israel–Premier Tech
- Team Flanders–Baloise
- Team TotalEnergies

== Route ==
Stage characteristics and winners
Stage	Date	Course	Distance	Type	Stage winner
1	15 February	Puente de Génave to Santiago de la Espada	179 km (111 mi)	Mountain stage	Tadej Pogačar (SLO)
2	16 February	Diezma to Alcalá la Real	156.1 km (97.0 mi)	Mountain stage	Tadej Pogačar (SLO)
3	17 February	Alcalá de Guadaíra to Alcalá de los Gazules	161 km (100 mi)	Flat stage	Tim Wellens (BEL)
4	18 February	Olvera to Iznájar	164.8 km (102.4 mi)	Hilly stage	Tadej Pogačar (SLO)
5	19 February	Huesa to Chiclana de Segura	184.3 km (114.5 mi)	Hilly stage	Omar Fraile (ESP)
Total			845.2 km (525.2 mi)		

== Stages ==
=== Stage 1 ===
15 February 2023 – Puente de Génave to Santiago de la Espada, 179 km (111 mi)

Stage 1 Result (1–10)
Rank	Rider	Team	Time
1	Tadej Pogačar (SLO)	UAE Team Emirates	5h 04' 19"
2	Mikel Landa (ESP)	Team Bahrain Victorious	+ 38"
3	Carlos Rodríguez (ESP)	Ineos Grenadiers	+ 38"
4	Santiago Buitrago (COL)	Team Bahrain Victorious	+ 38"
5	Tao Geoghegan Hart (GBR)	Ineos Grenadiers	+ 1' 38"
6	Pavel Sivakov (FRA)	Ineos Grenadiers	+ 1' 39"
7	Damiano Caruso (ITA)	Team Bahrain Victorious	+ 1' 39"
8	Enric Mas (ESP)	Movistar Team	+ 1' 39"
9	Jack Haig (AUS)	Team Bahrain Victorious	+ 1' 39"
10	Jefferson Cepeda (ECU)	Caja Rural–Seguros RGA	+ 1' 41"

General classification after Stage 1 (1–10)
Rank	Rider	Team	Time
1	Tadej Pogačar (SLO)	UAE Team Emirates	5h 04' 19"
2	Mikel Landa (ESP)	Team Bahrain Victorious	+ 38"
3	Carlos Rodríguez (ESP)	Ineos Grenadiers	+ 38"
4	Santiago Buitrago (COL)	Team Bahrain Victorious	+ 38"
5	Tao Geoghegan Hart (GBR)	Ineos Grenadiers	+ 1' 38"
6	Pavel Sivakov (FRA)	Ineos Grenadiers	+ 1' 39"
7	Damiano Caruso (ITA)	Team Bahrain Victorious	+ 1' 39"
8	Enric Mas (ESP)	Movistar Team	+ 1' 39"
9	Jack Haig (AUS)	Team Bahrain Victorious	+ 1' 39"
10	Jefferson Cepeda (ECU)	Caja Rural–Seguros RGA	+ 1' 41"

=== Stage 2 ===
16 February 2023 – Diezma to Alcalá la Real, 156.1 km (97.0 mi)

Stage 2 Result (1–10)
Rank	Rider	Team	Time
1	Tadej Pogačar (SLO)	UAE Team Emirates	3h 40' 10"
2	Enric Mas (ESP)	Movistar Team	+ 4"
3	Santiago Buitrago (COL)	Team Bahrain Victorious	+ 4"
4	Mikel Landa (ESP)	Team Bahrain Victorious	+ 4"
5	Carlos Rodríguez (ESP)	Ineos Grenadiers	+ 4"
6	Lorenzo Rota (ITA)	Intermarché–Circus–Wanty	+ 17"
7	Dylan Teuns (BEL)	Israel–Premier Tech	+ 21"
8	Tao Geoghegan Hart (GBR)	Ineos Grenadiers	+ 24"
9	Damiano Caruso (ITA)	Team Bahrain Victorious	+ 33"
10	Georg Zimmermann (GER)	Intermarché–Circus–Wanty	+ 36"

General classification after Stage 2 (1–10)
Rank	Rider	Team	Time
1	Tadej Pogačar (SLO)	UAE Team Emirates	8h 44' 19"
2	Santiago Buitrago (COL)	Team Bahrain Victorious	+ 48"
3	Mikel Landa (ESP)	Team Bahrain Victorious	+ 52"
4	Carlos Rodríguez (ESP)	Ineos Grenadiers	+ 52"
5	Enric Mas (ESP)	Movistar Team	+ 1' 47"
6	Tao Geoghegan Hart (GBR)	Ineos Grenadiers	+ 2' 12"
7	Damiano Caruso (ITA)	Team Bahrain Victorious	+ 2' 22"
8	Rafał Majka (POL)	UAE Team Emirates	+ 2' 51"
9	Pavel Sivakov (FRA)	Ineos Grenadiers	+ 2' 52"
10	Jack Haig (AUS)	Team Bahrain Victorious	+ 2' 52"

=== Stage 3 ===
17 February 2023 – Alcalá de Guadaíra to Alcalá de los Gazules, 161 km (100 mi)

Stage 3 Result (1–10)
Rank	Rider	Team	Time
1	Tim Wellens (BEL)	UAE Team Emirates	3h 47' 12"
2	Pierre Latour (FRA)	Team TotalEnergies	+ 14"
3	Samuele Battistella (ITA)	Astana Qazaqstan Team	+ 15"
4	Connor Swift (GBR)	Ineos Grenadiers	+ 15"
5	Laurenz Rex (BEL)	Intermarché–Circus–Wanty	+ 16"
6	Davide Bais (ITA)	Eolo–Kometa	+ 16"
7	Edoardo Zambanini (ITA)	Team Bahrain Victorious	+ 16"
8	Cyril Barthe (FRA)	Burgos BH	+ 26"
9	Erik Fetter (HUN)	Eolo–Kometa	+ 28"
10	Gorka Izagirre (ESP)	Movistar Team	+ 28"

General classification after Stage 3 (1–10)
Rank	Rider	Team	Time
1	Tadej Pogačar (SLO)	UAE Team Emirates	12h 35' 57"
2	Santiago Buitrago (COL)	Team Bahrain Victorious	+ 48"
3	Mikel Landa (ESP)	Team Bahrain Victorious	+ 52"
4	Carlos Rodríguez (ESP)	Ineos Grenadiers	+ 52"
5	Enric Mas (ESP)	Movistar Team	+ 1' 47"
6	José Manuel Díaz (ESP)	Burgos BH	+ 2' 12"
7	Gorka Izagirre (ESP)	Movistar Team	+ 2' 12"
8	Tao Geoghegan Hart (GBR)	Ineos Grenadiers	+ 2' 12"
9	Damiano Caruso (ITA)	Team Bahrain Victorious	+ 2' 22"
10	Tim Wellens (BEL)	UAE Team Emirates	+ 2' 26"

=== Stage 4 ===
18 February 2023 – Olvera to Iznájar, 164.8 km (102.4 mi)

Stage 4 Result (1–10)
Rank	Rider	Team	Time
1	Tadej Pogačar (SLO)	UAE Team Emirates	4h 01' 11"
2	Enric Mas (ESP)	Movistar Team	+ 3"
3	Lorenzo Rota (ITA)	Intermarché–Circus–Wanty	+ 9"
4	Mikel Landa (ESP)	Team Bahrain Victorious	+ 12"
5	Santiago Buitrago (COL)	Team Bahrain Victorious	+ 21"
6	Nick Schultz (AUS)	Israel–Premier Tech	+ 21"
7	Tao Geoghegan Hart (GBR)	Ineos Grenadiers	+ 21"
8	Andreas Kron (DEN)	Lotto–Dstny	+ 24"
9	Damiano Caruso (ITA)	Team Bahrain Victorious	+ 33"
10	Carlos Rodríguez (ESP)	Ineos Grenadiers	+ 33"

General classification after Stage 4 (1–10)
Rank	Rider	Team	Time
1	Tadej Pogačar (SLO)	UAE Team Emirates	16h 36' 58"
2	Mikel Landa (ESP)	Team Bahrain Victorious	+ 1' 14"
3	Santiago Buitrago (COL)	Team Bahrain Victorious	+ 1' 19"
4	Carlos Rodríguez (ESP)	Ineos Grenadiers	+ 1' 35"
5	Enric Mas (ESP)	Movistar Team	+ 1' 54"
6	Tao Geoghegan Hart (GBR)	Ineos Grenadiers	+ 2' 43"
7	Damiano Caruso (ITA)	Team Bahrain Victorious	+ 3' 05"
8	Lorenzo Rota (ITA)	Intermarché–Circus–Wanty	+ 3' 23"
9	Andreas Kron (DEN)	Lotto–Dstny	+ 3' 45"
10	Pavel Sivakov (FRA)	Ineos Grenadiers	+ 3' 53"

=== Stage 5 ===
19 February 2023 – Villa de Otura to Alhaurín de la Torre, 184.3 km (114.5 mi)

Stage 5 Result (1–10)
Rank	Rider	Team	Time
1	Omar Fraile (ESP)	Ineos Grenadiers	4h 27' 59"
2	Alessandro Covi (ITA)	UAE Team Emirates	+ 0"
3	Andrea Pasqualon (ITA)	Team Bahrain Victorious	+ 0"
4	Andreas Kron (DEN)	Lotto–Dstny	+ 0"
5	Nick Schultz (AUS)	Israel–Premier Tech	+ 0"
6	Gonzalo Serrano (ESP)	Movistar Team	+ 0"
7	Edvald Boasson Hagen (NOR)	Team TotalEnergies	+ 0"
8	Damiano Caruso (ITA)	Team Bahrain Victorious	+ 5"
9	Jesus Ezquerra (ESP)	Burgos BH	+ 5"
10	Lorenzo Rota (ITA)	Intermarché–Circus–Wanty	+ 5"

General classification after Stage 5 (1–10)
Rank	Rider	Team	Time
1	Tadej Pogačar (SLO)	UAE Team Emirates	21h 05' 02"
2	Mikel Landa (ESP)	Team Bahrain Victorious	+ 1' 18"
3	Santiago Buitrago (COL)	Team Bahrain Victorious	+ 1' 23"
4	Carlos Rodríguez (ESP)	Ineos Grenadiers	+ 1' 39"
5	Enric Mas (ESP)	Movistar Team	+ 2' 02"
6	Tao Geoghegan Hart (GBR)	Ineos Grenadiers	+ 2' 47"
7	Damiano Caruso (ITA)	Team Bahrain Victorious	+ 3' 05"
8	Lorenzo Rota (ITA)	Intermarché–Circus–Wanty	+ 3' 23"
9	Andreas Kron (DEN)	Lotto–Dstny	+ 3' 40"
10	Pavel Sivakov (FRA)	Ineos Grenadiers	+ 3' 57"

== Classification leadership table ==
Classification leadership by stage
Stage	Winner	General classification	Points classification	Mountains classification	Sprints classification	Andalusian rider classification	Spanish rider classification	Combination classification	Team classification
1	Tadej Pogačar	Tadej Pogačar	Tadej Pogačar	Gotzon Martín	Aaron Van Poucke	Carlos Rodríguez	Mikel Landa	Tadej Pogačar	Team Bahrain Victorious
2	Tadej Pogačar	Tadej Pogačar	Tadej Pogačar	Gotzon Martín	Aaron Van Poucke	Carlos Rodríguez	Mikel Landa	Tadej Pogačar	Team Bahrain Victorious
3	Tim Wellens	Tadej Pogačar	Tadej Pogačar	Gotzon Martín	Aaron Van Poucke	Carlos Rodríguez	Mikel Landa	Tadej Pogačar	Ineos Grenadiers
4	Tadej Pogačar	Tadej Pogačar	Tadej Pogačar	Gotzon Martín	Aaron Van Poucke	Carlos Rodríguez	Mikel Landa	Tadej Pogačar	Ineos Grenadiers
5	Omar Fraile	Tadej Pogačar	Tadej Pogačar	Gotzon Martín	Aaron Van Poucke	Carlos Rodríguez	Mikel Landa	Tadej Pogačar	Ineos Grenadiers
Final		Tadej Pogačar	Tadej Pogačar	Gotzon Martín	Aaron Van Poucke	Carlos Rodríguez	Mikel Landa	Tadej Pogačar	Ineos Grenadiers

== Final classification standings ==
Legend
Denotes the winner of the general classification	Denotes the winner of the sprints classification
Denotes the winner of the points classification	Denotes the winner of the Andalusian rider classification
Denotes the winner of the mountains classification	

=== General classification ===
Final general classification (1–10)
Rank	Rider	Team	Time
1	Tadej Pogačar (SLO)	UAE Team Emirates	21h 05' 02"
2	Mikel Landa (ESP)	Team Bahrain Victorious	+ 1' 18"
3	Santiago Buitrago (COL)	Team Bahrain Victorious	+ 1' 23"
4	Carlos Rodríguez (ESP)	Ineos Grenadiers	+ 1' 39"
5	Enric Mas (ESP)	Movistar Team	+ 2' 02"
6	Tao Geoghegan Hart (GBR)	Ineos Grenadiers	+ 2' 47"
7	Damiano Caruso (ITA)	Team Bahrain Victorious	+ 3' 05"
8	Lorenzo Rota (ITA)	Intermarché–Circus–Wanty	+ 3' 23"
9	Andreas Kron (DEN)	Lotto–Dstny	+ 3' 40"
10	Pavel Sivakov (FRA)	Ineos Grenadiers	+ 3' 57"

=== Points classification ===
Final points classification (1–10)
Rank	Rider	Team	Time
1	Tadej Pogačar (SLO)	UAE Team Emirates	77
2	Mikel Landa (ESP)	Team Bahrain Victorious	48
3	Enric Mas (ESP)	Movistar Team	48
4	Santiago Buitrago (COL)	Team Bahrain Victorious	42
5	Carlos Rodríguez (ESP)	Ineos Grenadiers	34
6	Lorenzo Rota (ITA)	Intermarché–Circus–Wanty	32
7	Damiano Caruso (ITA)	Team Bahrain Victorious	31
8	Tim Wellens (BEL)	UAE Team Emirates	29
9	Tao Geoghegan Hart (GBR)	Ineos Grenadiers	29
10	Omar Fraile (ESP)	Ineos Grenadiers	25

=== Mountains classification ===
Final mountains classification (1–10)
Rank	Rider	Team	Time
1	Gotzon Martín (ESP)	Euskaltel–Euskadi	26
2	Álex Martín (ESP)	Euskaltel–Euskadi	18
3	Dries De Bondt (BEL)	Alpecin–Deceuninck	16
4	Tadej Pogačar (SLO)	UAE Team Emirates	15
5	Clément Alleno (FRA)	Burgos BH	10
6	Pavel Sivakov (FRA)	Ineos Grenadiers	9
7	Mikel Landa (ESP)	Team Bahrain Victorious	9
8	Omar Fraile (ESP)	Ineos Grenadiers	8
9	Edvald Boasson Hagen (NOR)	Team TotalEnergies	8
10	Pascal Eenkhoorn (NED)	Lotto–Dstny	7

=== Sprints classification ===
Final sprints classification (1–10)
Rank	Rider	Team	Time
1	Aaron Van Poucke (BEL)	Team Flanders–Baloise	9
2	Vincent Van Hemelen (BEL)	Team Flanders–Baloise	3
3	Edvald Boasson Hagen (NOR)	Team TotalEnergies	3
4	Álex Martín (ESP)	Euskaltel–Euskadi	3
5	Dries Van Gestel (BEL)	Team TotalEnergies	2
6	Pavel Sivakov (FRA)	Ineos Grenadiers	2
7	Nelson Oliveira (POR)	Movistar Team	2
8	Clément Alleno (FRA)	Burgos BH	2
9	Erik Fetter (HUN)	Eolo–Kometa	1
10	Jefferson Alveiro Cepeda (ECU)	Caja Rural–Seguros RGA	1

=== Team classification ===
Final team classification (1–10)
Rank	Team	Time
1	(United Kingdom) Ineos Grenadiers	63h 15' 54"
2	Team Bahrain Victorious	+ 43"
3	(United Arab Emirates) UAE Team Emirates	+ 9' 57"
4	(Spain) Movistar Team	+ 14' 41"
5	(Australia) Team Jayco–AlUla	+ 19' 59"
6	(Belgium) Intermarché–Circus–Wanty	+ 32' 40"
7	(Spain) Burgos BH	+ 34' 48"
8	(Italy) Eolo–Kometa	+ 38' 55"
9	Israel–Premier Tech	+ 46' 35"
10	(Belgium) Lotto–Dstny	+ 51' 06"
