= 2022 Vuelta a Andalucía =

Spanish cycling race

2022 UCI ProSeries

Race details
- Dates: 16–20 February 2022
- Stages: 5
- Distance: 818.3 km (508.5 mi)
- Winning time: 20h 51' 27"

Results
Jersey awarded to the overall winner	Winner	Wout Poels (NED)	(Team Bahrain Victorious)
	Second	Cristián Rodríguez (ESP)	(Team TotalEnergies)
	Third	Miguel Ángel López (COL)	(Astana Qazaqstan Team)
Jersey awarded to the points classification winner	Points	Alessandro Covi (ITA)	(UAE Team Emirates)
Jersey awarded to the mountains classification winner	Mountains	Jon Barrenetxea (ESP)	(Caja Rural–Seguros RGA)
	Combination	Miguel Ángel López (COL)	(Astana Qazaqstan Team)
Jersey awarded to the sprints classification winner	Sprints	Diego Pablo Sevilla (ESP)	(Eolo–Kometa)
	Team	Astana Qazaqstan Team	

The 2022 Vuelta a Andalucía Ruta del Sol (English: Tour of Andalucia Route of the Sun) was a road cycling stage race that took place between 16 and 20 February 2022 in the autonomous community of Andalusia in southern Spain. The race was rated as a category 2.Pro event on the 2022 UCI ProSeries calendar, and was the 68th edition of the Vuelta a Andalucía.

After the 2021 edition was postponed to May due to the COVID-19 pandemic in Spain, the race returned to its traditional mid-February timeslot.

== Teams ==
12 of the 18 UCI WorldTeams and ten UCI ProTeams made up the 22 teams that participated in the race. Only 14 teams entered a full squad of seven riders each. Four teams entered six riders each, and three teams entered five riders each, while Team TotalEnergies was the only team to enter four riders. Euskaltel–Euskadi, with one non-starter, was reduced to six riders. In total, 140 riders started the race, of which 108 finished.

Before stage 3, Gazprom–RusVelo and Human Powered Health both withdrew from the race after returning multiple positive COVID-19 test results.

UCI WorldTeams

- AG2R Citroën Team
- Astana Qazaqstan Team
- Bora–Hansgrohe
- INEOS Grenadiers
- Intermarché–Wanty–Gobert Matériaux
- Israel–Premier Tech
- Lotto–Soudal
- Movistar Team
- Quick-Step Alpha Vinyl Team
- Team Bahrain Victorious
- Team BikeExchange–Jayco
- UAE Team Emirates

UCI ProTeams

- Alpecin–Fenix
- Burgos BH
- Caja Rural–Seguros RGA
- Eolo–Kometa
- Equipo Kern Pharma
- Euskaltel–Euskadi
- Gazprom–RusVelo
- Human Powered Health
- Sport Vlaanderen–Baloise
- Team TotalEnergies

== Route ==
Stage characteristics and winners
Stage	Date	Course	Distance	Type	Stage winner
1	16 February	Ubrique to Iznájar	200.7 km (124.7 mi)	Hilly stage	Rune Herregodts (BEL)
2	17 February	Archidona to Alcalá la Real	150.6 km (93.6 mi)	Mountain stage	Alessandro Covi (ITA)
3	18 February	Lucena to Otura	153.2 km (95.2 mi)	Hilly stage	Magnus Sheffield (USA)
4	19 February	Cúllar Vega to Baza	167.4 km (104.0 mi)	Mountain stage	Wout Poels (NED)
5	20 February	Huesa to Chiclana de Segura	146.4 km (91.0 mi)	Mountain stage	Lennard Kämna (GER)
Total			818.3 km (508.5 mi)		

== Stages ==
=== Stage 1 ===
16 February 2022 – Ubrique to Iznájar, 200.7 km (124.7 mi)

Stage 1 Result (1–10)
Rank	Rider	Team	Time
1	Rune Herregodts (BEL)	Sport Vlaanderen–Baloise	5h 16' 44"
2	Stephen Bassett (USA)	Human Powered Health	+ 2"
3	Ander Okamika (ESP)	Burgos BH	+ 2"
4	Xabier Isasa (ESP)	Euskaltel–Euskadi	+ 12"
5	Lindsay De Vylder (BEL)	Sport Vlaanderen–Baloise	+ 15"
6	Mark Christian (GBR)	Eolo–Kometa	+ 18"
7	Alessandro Covi (ITA)	UAE Team Emirates	+ 31"
8	Gonzalo Serrano (ESP)	Movistar Team	+ 37"
9	Matteo Trentin (ITA)	UAE Team Emirates	+ 37"
10	Benoît Cosnefroy (FRA)	AG2R Citroën Team	+ 37"

General classification after Stage 1 (1–10)
Rank	Rider	Team	Time
1	Rune Herregodts (BEL)	Sport Vlaanderen–Baloise	5h 16' 44"
2	Stephen Bassett (USA)	Human Powered Health	+ 2"
3	Ander Okamika (ESP)	Burgos BH	+ 2"
4	Xabier Isasa (ESP)	Euskaltel–Euskadi	+ 12"
5	Lindsay De Vylder (BEL)	Sport Vlaanderen–Baloise	+ 15"
6	Mark Christian (GBR)	Eolo–Kometa	+ 18"
7	Alessandro Covi (ITA)	UAE Team Emirates	+ 31"
8	Gonzalo Serrano (ESP)	Movistar Team	+ 37"
9	Matteo Trentin (ITA)	UAE Team Emirates	+ 37"
10	Benoît Cosnefroy (FRA)	AG2R Citroën Team	+ 37"

=== Stage 2 ===
17 February 2022 – Archidona to Alcalá la Real, 150.6 km (93.6 mi)

Stage 2 Result (1–10)
Rank	Rider	Team	Time
1	Alessandro Covi (ITA)	UAE Team Emirates	3h 57' 46"
2	Miguel Ángel López (COL)	Astana Qazaqstan Team	+ 2"
3	Iván Sosa (COL)	Movistar Team	+ 4"
4	Jack Haig (AUS)	Team Bahrain Victorious	+ 4"
5	Steff Cras (BEL)	Lotto–Soudal	+ 4"
6	Carlos Rodríguez (ESP)	INEOS Grenadiers	+ 4"
7	Dries Devenyns (BEL)	Quick-Step Alpha Vinyl Team	+ 4"
8	Domenico Pozzovivo (ITA)	Intermarché–Wanty–Gobert Matériaux	+ 4"
9	Simon Clarke (AUS)	Israel–Premier Tech	+ 4"
10	Cristián Rodríguez (ESP)	Team TotalEnergies	+ 4"

General classification after Stage 2 (1–10)
Rank	Rider	Team	Time
1	Alessandro Covi (ITA)	UAE Team Emirates	9h 15' 01"
2	Ander Okamika (ESP)	Burgos BH	+ 5"
3	Miguel Ángel López (COL)	Astana Qazaqstan Team	+ 8"
4	Jack Haig (AUS)	Team Bahrain Victorious	+ 10"
5	Dries Devenyns (BEL)	Quick-Step Alpha Vinyl Team	+ 10"
6	Simon Clarke (AUS)	Israel–Premier Tech	+ 10"
7	Steff Cras (BEL)	Lotto–Soudal	+ 10"
8	Cristián Rodríguez (ESP)	Team TotalEnergies	+ 10"
9	Iván Sosa (COL)	Movistar Team	+ 10"
10	Domenico Pozzovivo (ITA)	Intermarché–Wanty–Gobert Matériaux	+ 10"

=== Stage 3 ===
18 February 2022 – Lucena to Otura, 153.2 km (95.2 mi)

Stage 3 Result (1–10)
Rank	Rider	Team	Time
1	Magnus Sheffield (USA)	INEOS Grenadiers	3h 54' 37"
2	Simon Clarke (AUS)	Israel–Premier Tech	+ 3"
3	Stan Dewulf (BEL)	AG2R Citroën Team	+ 3"
4	Ben Turner (GBR)	INEOS Grenadiers	+ 3"
5	Mauri Vansevenant (BEL)	Quick-Step Alpha Vinyl Team	+ 3"
6	Wout Poels (NED)	Team Bahrain Victorious	+ 3"
7	Alessandro Covi (ITA)	UAE Team Emirates	+ 3"
8	Simon Yates (GBR)	Team BikeExchange–Jayco	+ 3"
9	Miguel Ángel López (COL)	Astana Qazaqstan Team	+ 3"
10	Dries Devenyns (BEL)	Quick-Step Alpha Vinyl Team	+ 3"

General classification after Stage 3 (1–10)
Rank	Rider	Team	Time
1	Alessandro Covi (ITA)	UAE Team Emirates	13h 09' 41"
2	Miguel Ángel López (COL)	Astana Qazaqstan Team	+ 8"
3	Simon Clarke (AUS)	Israel–Premier Tech	+ 10"
4	Dries Devenyns (BEL)	Quick-Step Alpha Vinyl Team	+ 10"
5	Steff Cras (BEL)	Lotto–Soudal	+ 10"
6	Jack Haig (AUS)	Team Bahrain Victorious	+ 10"
7	Cristián Rodríguez (ESP)	Team TotalEnergies	+ 10"
8	Iván Sosa (COL)	Movistar Team	+ 10"
9	Domenico Pozzovivo (ITA)	Intermarché–Wanty–Gobert Matériaux	+ 10"
10	Carlos Rodríguez (ESP)	INEOS Grenadiers	+ 10"

=== Stage 4 ===
19 February 2022 – Cúllar Vega to Baza, 167.4 km (104.0 mi)

Stage 4 Result (1–10)
Rank	Rider	Team	Time
1	Wout Poels (NED)	Team Bahrain Victorious	3h 56' 52"
2	Alexey Lutsenko (KAZ)	Astana Qazaqstan Team	+ 0"
3	Mauri Vansevenant (BEL)	Quick-Step Alpha Vinyl Team	+ 18"
4	Simon Yates (GBR)	Team BikeExchange–Jayco	+ 18"
5	Damiano Caruso (ITA)	Team Bahrain Victorious	+ 18"
6	Cristián Rodríguez (ESP)	Team TotalEnergies	+ 18"
7	Jack Haig (AUS)	Team Bahrain Victorious	+ 18"
8	Iván Sosa (COL)	Movistar Team	+ 18"
9	Ben O'Connor (AUS)	AG2R Citroën Team	+ 18"
10	Miguel Ángel López (COL)	Astana Qazaqstan Team	+ 18"

General classification after Stage 4 (1–10)
Rank	Rider	Team	Time
1	Wout Poels (NED)	Team Bahrain Victorious	17h 06' 49"
2	Miguel Ángel López (COL)	Astana Qazaqstan Team	+ 10"
3	Cristián Rodríguez (ESP)	Team TotalEnergies	+ 12"
4	Jack Haig (AUS)	Team Bahrain Victorious	+ 12"
5	Iván Sosa (COL)	Movistar Team	+ 12"
6	Carlos Rodríguez (ESP)	INEOS Grenadiers	+ 12"
7	Simon Yates (GBR)	Team BikeExchange–Jayco	+ 21"
8	Ben O'Connor (AUS)	AG2R Citroën Team	+ 21"
9	Alexey Lutsenko (KAZ)	Astana Qazaqstan Team	+ 24"
10	Mauri Vansevenant (BEL)	Quick-Step Alpha Vinyl Team	+ 27"

=== Stage 5 ===
20 February 2022 – Huesa to Chiclana de Segura, 146.4 km (91.0 mi)

Stage 5 Result (1–10)
Rank	Rider	Team	Time
1	Lennard Kämna (GER)	Bora–Hansgrohe	3h 43' 05"
2	Lorenzo Fortunato (ITA)	Eolo–Kometa	+ 4"
3	Alessandro Covi (ITA)	UAE Team Emirates	+ 10"
4	Magnus Sheffield (USA)	INEOS Grenadiers	+ 12"
5	Gonzalo Serrano (ESP)	Movistar Team	+ 25"
6	Emanuel Buchmann (GER)	Bora–Hansgrohe	+ 26"
7	Stefano Oldani (ITA)	Alpecin–Fenix	+ 27"
8	Simone Velasco (ITA)	Astana Qazaqstan Team	+ 29"
9	Floris De Tier (BEL)	Alpecin–Fenix	+ 39"
10	Nelson Oliveira (POR)	Movistar Team	+ 49"

General classification after Stage 5 (1–10)
Rank	Rider	Team	Time
1	Wout Poels (NED)	Team Bahrain Victorious	20h 51' 27"
2	Cristián Rodríguez (ESP)	Team TotalEnergies	+ 14"
3	Miguel Ángel López (COL)	Astana Qazaqstan Team	+ 15"
4	Carlos Rodríguez (ESP)	INEOS Grenadiers	+ 19"
5	Simon Yates (GBR)	Team BikeExchange–Jayco	+ 20"
6	Jack Haig (AUS)	Team Bahrain Victorious	+ 22"
7	Ben O'Connor (AUS)	AG2R Citroën Team	+ 26"
8	Mauri Vansevenant (BEL)	Quick-Step Alpha Vinyl Team	+ 32"
9	Alexey Lutsenko (KAZ)	Astana Qazaqstan Team	+ 34"
10	Iván Sosa (COL)	Movistar Team	+ 39"

== Classification leadership table ==
Classification leadership by stage
Stage	Winner	General classification	Points classification	Mountains classification	Sprints classification	Andalusian rider classification	Spanish rider classification	Combined classification	Team classification
1	Rune Herregodts	Rune Herregodts	Rune Herregodts	Álvaro Cuadros	Stephen Bassett	Cristián Rodríguez	Ander Okamika	Rune Herregodts	Sport Vlaanderen–Baloise
2	Alessandro Covi	Alessandro Covi	Alessandro Covi	Jon Barrenetxea	Diego Pablo Sevilla	Cristián Rodríguez	Ander Okamika	Ander Okamika	Astana Qazaqstan Team
3	Magnus Sheffield	Alessandro Covi	Alessandro Covi	Jon Barrenetxea	Diego Pablo Sevilla	Cristián Rodríguez	Cristián Rodríguez	Xabier Isasa	Astana Qazaqstan Team
4	Wout Poels	Wout Poels	Alessandro Covi	Jon Barrenetxea	Damiano Caruso	Cristián Rodríguez	Cristián Rodríguez	Miguel Ángel López	Astana Qazaqstan Team
5	Lennard Kämna	Wout Poels	Alessandro Covi	Jon Barrenetxea	Diego Pablo Sevilla	Cristián Rodríguez	Cristián Rodríguez	Miguel Ángel López	Astana Qazaqstan Team
Final		Wout Poels	Alessandro Covi	Jon Barrenetxea	Diego Pablo Sevilla	Cristián Rodríguez	Cristián Rodríguez	Miguel Ángel López	Astana Qazaqstan Team

- On stage 2, Ander Okamika, who was third in the points classification, wore the green jersey, because first-placed Rune Herregodts wore the yellow jersey as the leader of the general classification, and second-placed Stephen Bassett wore the blue jersey as the leader of the sprints classification.
- On stage 3, Rune Herregodts, who was second in the points classification, wore the green jersey, because first-placed Alessandro Covi wore the yellow jersey as the leader of the general classification. For the same reason, Simon Clarke wore the green jersey on stage 4.

== Final classification standings ==
Legend
Denotes the winner of the general classification	Denotes the winner of the sprints classification
Denotes the winner of the points classification	Denotes the winner of the Andalusian rider classification
Denotes the winner of the mountains classification	

=== General classification ===
Final general classification (1–10)
Rank	Rider	Team	Time
1	Wout Poels (NED)	Team Bahrain Victorious	20h 51' 27"
2	Cristián Rodríguez (ESP)	Team TotalEnergies	+ 14"
3	Miguel Ángel López (COL)	Astana Qazaqstan Team	+ 15"
4	Carlos Rodríguez (ESP)	INEOS Grenadiers	+ 19"
5	Simon Yates (GBR)	Team BikeExchange–Jayco	+ 20"
6	Jack Haig (AUS)	Team Bahrain Victorious	+ 22"
7	Ben O'Connor (AUS)	AG2R Citroën Team	+ 26"
8	Mauri Vansevenant (BEL)	Quick-Step Alpha Vinyl Team	+ 32"
9	Alexey Lutsenko (KAZ)	Astana Qazaqstan Team	+ 34"
10	Iván Sosa (COL)	Movistar Team	+ 39"

=== Points classification ===
Final points classification (1–10)
Rank	Rider	Team	Points
1	Alessandro Covi (ITA)	UAE Team Emirates	59
2	Wout Poels (NED)	Team Bahrain Victorious	41
3	Magnus Sheffield (USA)	INEOS Grenadiers	39
4	Miguel Ángel López (COL)	Astana Qazaqstan Team	33
5	Mauri Vansevenant (BEL)	Quick-Step Alpha Vinyl Team	31
6	Simon Clarke (AUS)	Israel–Premier Tech	31
7	Simon Yates (GBR)	Team BikeExchange–Jayco	29
8	Lennard Kämna (GER)	Bora–Hansgrohe	25
9	Alexey Lutsenko (KAZ)	Astana Qazaqstan Team	25
10	Gonzalo Serrano (ESP)	Movistar Team	25

=== Mountains classification ===
Final mountains classification (1–10)
Rank	Rider	Team	Points
1	Jon Barrenetxea (ESP)	Caja Rural–Seguros RGA	30
2	Álvaro Cuadros (ESP)	Caja Rural–Seguros RGA	24
3	Alexey Lutsenko (KAZ)	Astana Qazaqstan Team	24
4	Xabier Isasa (ESP)	Euskaltel–Euskadi	21
5	Ben O'Connor (AUS)	AG2R Citroën Team	14
6	Miguel Ángel López (COL)	Astana Qazaqstan Team	12
7	Ander Okamika (ESP)	Burgos BH	12
8	Gotzon Martín (ESP)	Euskaltel–Euskadi	10
9	Lorenzo Fortunato (ITA)	Eolo–Kometa	7
10	Lennard Kämna (GER)	Bora–Hansgrohe	6

=== Sprints classification ===
Final sprints classification (1–10)
Rank	Rider	Team	Points
1	Diego Pablo Sevilla (ESP)	Eolo–Kometa	9
2	Damiano Caruso (ITA)	Team Bahrain Victorious	6
3	Cristián Rodríguez (ESP)	Team TotalEnergies	4
4	Lindsay De Vylder (BEL)	Sport Vlaanderen–Baloise	4
5	Emanuel Buchmann (GER)	Bora–Hansgrohe	3
6	Nelson Oliveira (POR)	Movistar Team	3
7	Ibai Azurmendi (ESP)	Euskaltel–Euskadi	3
8	Miguel Ángel López (COL)	Astana Qazaqstan Team	2
9	Jack Haig (AUS)	Team Bahrain Victorious	2
10	Alexey Lutsenko (KAZ)	Astana Qazaqstan Team	2

=== Andalusian rider classification ===
Final Andalusian rider classification (1–5)
Rank	Rider	Team	Time
1	Cristián Rodríguez (ESP)	Team TotalEnergies	20h 51' 41"
2	Carlos Rodríguez (ESP)	INEOS Grenadiers	+ 5"
3	Luis Ángel Maté (ESP)	Euskaltel–Euskadi	+ 19' 39"
4	Álvaro Cuadros (ESP)	Caja Rural–Seguros RGA	+ 30' 33"
5	Alejandro Ropero (ESP)	Eolo–Kometa	+ 42' 44"

=== Spanish rider classification ===
Final Spanish rider classification (1–10)
Rank	Rider	Team	Time
1	Cristián Rodríguez (ESP)	Team TotalEnergies	20h 51' 41"
2	Carlos Rodríguez (ESP)	INEOS Grenadiers	+ 5"
3	Gonzalo Serrano (ESP)	Movistar Team	+ 6' 13"
4	Mikel Landa (ESP)	Team Bahrain Victorious	+ 11' 31"
5	Antonio Jesús Soto (ESP)	Euskaltel–Euskadi	+ 15' 44"
6	Daniel Navarro (ESP)	Burgos BH	+ 17' 11"
7	Ibai Azurmendi (ESP)	Euskaltel–Euskadi	+ 18' 27"
8	Luis Ángel Maté (ESP)	Euskaltel–Euskadi	+ 19' 39"
9	Ander Okamika (ESP)	Burgos BH	+ 21' 24"
10	Sergio Martín (ESP)	Caja Rural–Seguros RGA	+ 22' 51"

=== Combined classification ===
Final combined classification (1–10)
Rank	Rider	Team	Points
1	Miguel Ángel López (COL)	Astana Qazaqstan Team	13
2	Alexey Lutsenko (KAZ)	Astana Qazaqstan Team	21
3	Wout Poels (NED)	Team Bahrain Victorious	22
4	Mauri Vansevenant (BEL)	Quick-Step Alpha Vinyl Team	28
5	Ben O'Connor (AUS)	AG2R Citroën Team	34
6	Alessandro Covi (ITA)	UAE Team Emirates	35
7	Lorenzo Fortunato (ITA)	Eolo–Kometa	40
8	Cristián Rodríguez (ESP)	Team TotalEnergies	42
9	Lennard Kämna (GER)	Bora–Hansgrohe	47
10	Damiano Caruso (ITA)	Team Bahrain Victorious	48

=== Team classification ===
Final team classification (1–10)
Rank	Team	Time
1	Astana Qazaqstan Team	62h 35' 11"
2	Team Bahrain Victorious	+ 1' 35"
3	INEOS Grenadiers	+ 13' 37"
4	Movistar Team	+ 13' 38"
5	UAE Team Emirates	+ 22' 16"
6	AG2R Citroën Team	+ 28' 01"
7	Bora–Hansgrohe	+ 29' 03"
8	Team BikeExchange–Jayco	+ 30' 11"
9	Quick-Step Alpha Vinyl Team	+ 33' 36"
10	Caja Rural–Seguros RGA	+ 34' 35"
