= 2020 Giro d'Italia =

Cycling race

2020 UCI World Tour, race 16 of 21
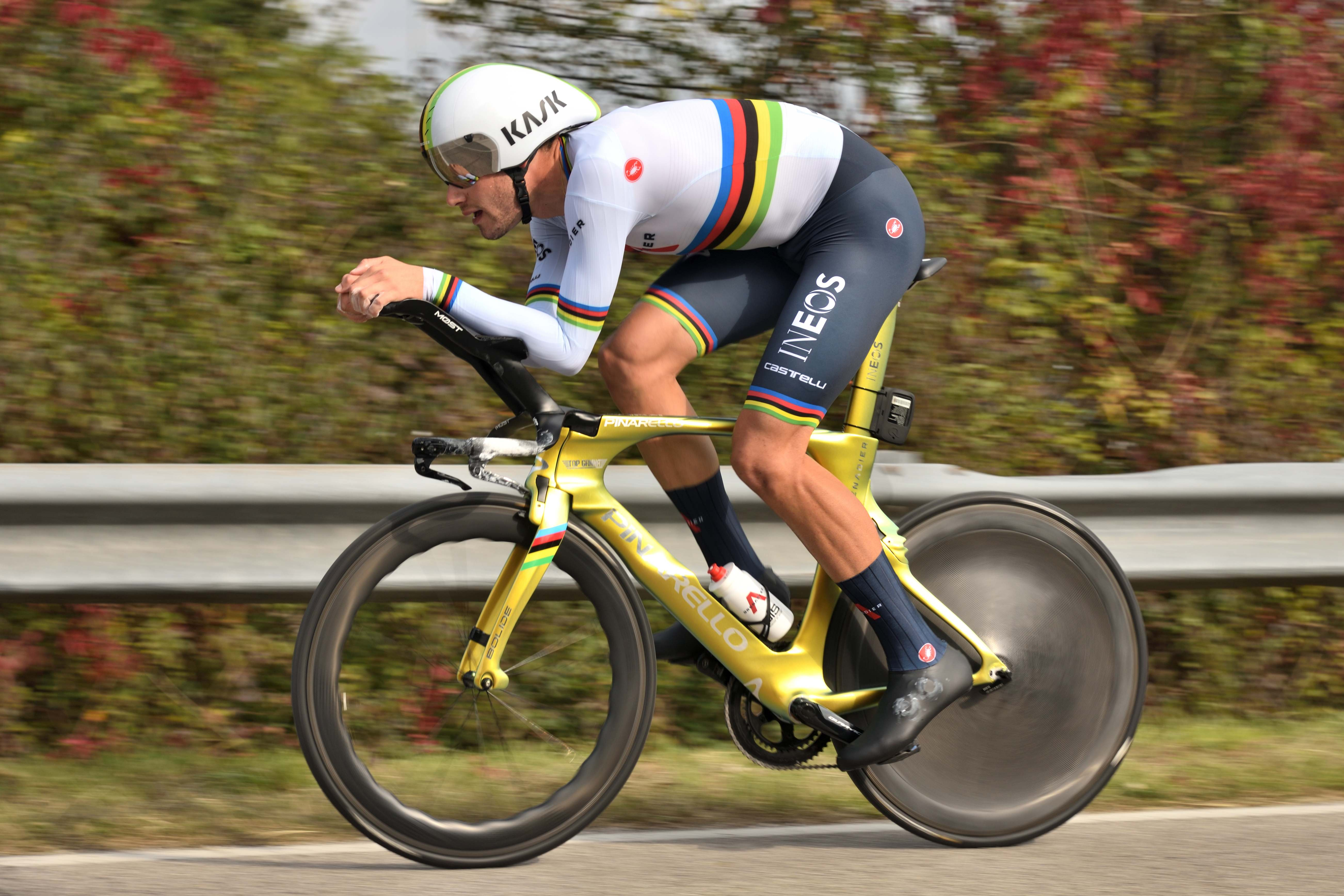
- Filippo Ganna on stage 14

Race details
- Dates: 3–25 October 2020
- Stages: 21
- Distance: 3,361.4 (Note: Distance originally was 3,497.9 km.) km (2,088.7 mi)
- Winning time: 85h 40' 21"

Results
Jersey awarded to the overall winner	Winner	Tao Geoghegan Hart (GBR)	(INEOS Grenadiers)
	Second	Jai Hindley (AUS)	(Team Sunweb)
	Third	Wilco Kelderman (NED)	(Team Sunweb)
Jersey awarded to the points classification winner	Points	Arnaud Démare (FRA)	(Groupama–FDJ)
Jersey awarded to the mountains classification winner	Mountains	Ruben Guerreiro (POR)	(EF Pro Cycling)
Jersey awarded to the young rider classification winner	Young rider	Tao Geoghegan Hart (GBR)	(INEOS Grenadiers)
	Sprints	Simon Pellaud (SUI)	(Androni Giocattoli–Sidermec)
Jersey awarded to the combativity classification winner	Combativity	Thomas De Gendt (BEL)	(Lotto–Soudal)
	Team	(United Kingdom) INEOS Grenadiers	

The 2020 Giro d'Italia was a road cycling stage race that took place between 3 and 25 October, after initially being postponed due to the COVID-19 pandemic. It was originally to have taken place from 9 to 31 May 2020, as the 103rd edition of the Giro d'Italia, a three-week Grand Tour. The start of the 2020 Giro (known as the Grande Partenza) had been planned to take place in Budapest, Hungary, which would have been the 14th time the Giro has started outside Italy, and the first time a Grand Tour has visited Hungary.

The event was jeopardised by the COVID-19 pandemic in Italy, and in March 2020 it was postponed, as other early season races in Italy had been. When the government of Hungary announced they would not allow the Grande Partenza to take place, RCS Sport decided they would postpone the race to a later to-be-determined date. On 15 April, UCI announced that both Giro and Vuelta would take place in autumn after the 2020 UCI Road World Championships. On 5 May, UCI announced that the Giro would take place between 3 and 25 October, overlapping with the 2020 Vuelta a España .

The race was won by Tao Geoghegan Hart of Great Britain and Ineos Grenadiers, who finished 39 seconds ahead of Australia's Jai Hindley, having taken over leadership of his team after pre-race favourite and teammate Geraint Thomas had crashed out at an early stage. Geoghehan Hart also won the young riders' jersey, and became the first rider in Giro history to win the pink jersey outright on the final stage, having never worn it during the race – he entered the decisive final day time-trial level on time, but second on countback, to Hindley. The mountains jersey was won by Ruben Guerreiro and the sprinters' prize went to Simon Pellaud.

== Teams ==
Twenty-two teams participated in the 2020 Giro d'Italia. All nineteen UCI WorldTeams are entitled, and obliged, to enter the race. Additionally, three second-tier UCI ProTeams were invited to participate in the event. The teams were announced on 16 January 2020. On 13 October 2020, ahead of the start of stage 10, Mitchelton-Scott and Jumbo-Visma withdrew all their remaining riders from the race following positive COVID-19 tests.

The teams participating in the race were:

UCI WorldTeams

- AG2R La Mondiale
- Astana
- Bahrain–McLaren
- Bora–Hansgrohe
- CCC Team
- Cofidis
- Deceuninck–Quick-Step
- EF Pro Cycling
- Groupama–FDJ
- Israel Start-Up Nation
- Lotto–Soudal
- Mitchelton–Scott
- Movistar Team
- NTT Pro Cycling
- INEOS Grenadiers
- Team Jumbo–Visma
- Team Sunweb
- Trek–Segafredo
- UAE Team Emirates

UCI ProTeams

- Androni Giocattoli–Sidermec
- Bardiani–CSF–Faizanè
- Vini Zabù–Brado–KTM

== Pre-race favourites ==
Geraint Thomas (INEOS Grenadiers), the 2018 Tour de France champion, was considered the pre-race favourite. Simon Yates (Mitchelton–Scott) was seen as one of his main challengers after beating Thomas in the lead-up race Tirreno–Adriatico. Steven Kruijswijk (Team Jumbo–Visma), a previous race leader in 2016, was another top contender, as was the only past champion in the field – two-time winner Vincenzo Nibali (Trek–Segafredo). Astana's trio of Jakob Fuglsang, Miguel Ángel López and Aleksandr Vlasov were also seen as top contenders. Other riders considered as contenders included Rafał Majka (Bora–Hansgrohe) and Wilco Kelderman (Team Sunweb). Remco Evenepoel (Deceuninck–Quick-Step) was earlier considered a favourite but did not enter the race due to injuries sustained in Il Lombardia.

Riders believed to be the main contenders for victories on the sprint stages were Arnaud Démare (Groupama–FDJ), Fernando Gaviria (UAE Team Emirates), Peter Sagan (Bora–Hansgrohe), Elia Viviani (Cofidis) and Michael Matthews (Team Sunweb).

== Route and stages ==
List of stages
Stage	Date	Course	Distance	Type	Winner
1	3 October	Monreale to Palermo	15 km (9 mi)	Individual time trial	Filippo Ganna (ITA)
2	4 October	Alcamo to Agrigento	149 km (93 mi)	Hilly stage	Diego Ulissi (ITA)
3	5 October	Enna to Etna	150 km (93 mi)	Mountain stage	Jonathan Caicedo (ECU)
4	6 October	Catania to Villafranca Tirrena	140 km (87 mi)	Flat stage	Arnaud Démare (FRA)
5	7 October	Mileto to Camigliatello Silano	225 km (140 mi)	Intermediate stage	Filippo Ganna (ITA)
6	8 October	Castrovillari to Matera	188 km (117 mi)	Flat stage	Arnaud Démare (FRA)
7	9 October	Matera to Brindisi	143 km (89 mi)	Flat stage	Arnaud Démare (FRA)
8	10 October	Giovinazzo to Vieste	200 km (124 mi)	Intermediate stage	Alex Dowsett (GBR)
9	11 October	San Salvo to Roccaraso (Aremogna)	207 km (129 mi)	Mountain stage	Ruben Guerreiro (POR)
	12 October			Rest day	
10	13 October	Lanciano to Tortoreto	177 km (110 mi)	Intermediate stage	Peter Sagan (SVK)
11	14 October	Porto Sant'Elpidio to Rimini	182 km (113 mi)	Flat stage	Arnaud Démare (FRA)
12	15 October	Cesenatico to Cesenatico	204 km (127 mi)	Intermediate stage	Jhonatan Narváez (ECU)
13	16 October	Cervia to Monselice	192 km (119 mi)	Hilly stage	Diego Ulissi (ITA)
14	17 October	Conegliano to Valdobbiadene	34.1 km (21 mi)	Individual time trial	Filippo Ganna (ITA)
15	18 October	Base Aerea Rivolto to Piancavallo	185 km (115 mi)	Mountain stage	Tao Geoghegan Hart (GBR)
	19 October			Rest day	
16	20 October	Udine to San Daniele del Friuli	229 km (142 mi)	Intermediate stage	Jan Tratnik (SLO)
17	21 October	Bassano del Grappa to Madonna di Campiglio	203 km (126 mi)	Mountain stage	Ben O'Connor (AUS)
18	22 October	Pinzolo to Laghi di Cancano	207 km (129 mi)	Mountain stage	Jai Hindley (AUS)
19	23 October	~~Morbegno~~ Abbiategrasso to Asti	124.5 km (77 mi) (Note: Distance originally was 253 km, then it was rerouted to 258 km. Before the start of the stage, the distance was shortened to 124.5 km after riders were protesting against the long distance in bad weather conditions.)	Flat stage	Josef Černý (CZE)
20	24 October	Alba to Sestriere	190 km (118 mi) (Note: Distance originally was 198 km. Due to French COVID-19 rules, the Giro was not allowed to enter France.)	Mountain stage	Tao Geoghegan Hart (GBR)
21	25 October	Cernusco sul Naviglio to Milan	15.7 km (10 mi)	Individual time trial	Filippo Ganna (ITA)
	Total		3,361.4 km (2,089 mi)		

== Classification leadership ==
Classification leadership by stage
Stage	Winner	General classification	Points classification	Mountains classification	Young rider classification	General Super Team	Intermediate sprint classification	Combativity classification	Breakaway classification	Fair play classification
1	Filippo Ganna	Filippo Ganna	Filippo Ganna	Rick Zabel	Filippo Ganna	INEOS Grenadiers	Not awarded	Filippo Ganna	Not awarded	INEOS Grenadiers
2	Diego Ulissi	Filippo Ganna	Diego Ulissi	Peter Sagan	Filippo Ganna	INEOS Grenadiers	Thomas De Gendt	Thomas De Gendt	Ben Gastauer	INEOS Grenadiers
3	Jonathan Caicedo	João Almeida	Diego Ulissi	Jonathan Caicedo	João Almeida	Deceuninck–Quick-Step	Thomas De Gendt	Jonathan Caicedo	Giovanni Visconti	Deceuninck–Quick-Step
4	Arnaud Démare	João Almeida	Peter Sagan	Jonathan Caicedo	João Almeida	Deceuninck–Quick-Step	Thomas De Gendt	Jonathan Caicedo	Giovanni Visconti	Team Sunweb
5	Filippo Ganna	João Almeida	Peter Sagan	Filippo Ganna	João Almeida	Deceuninck–Quick-Step	Thomas De Gendt	Jonathan Caicedo	Filippo Ganna	Team Sunweb
6	Arnaud Démare	João Almeida	Arnaud Démare	Filippo Ganna	João Almeida	Deceuninck–Quick-Step	Mattia Bais	Jonathan Caicedo	Mattia Bais	Trek–Segafredo
7	Arnaud Démare	João Almeida	Arnaud Démare	Filippo Ganna	João Almeida	Deceuninck–Quick-Step	Marco Frapporti	Arnaud Démare	Mattia Bais	Trek–Segafredo
8	Alex Dowsett	João Almeida	Arnaud Démare	Filippo Ganna	João Almeida	INEOS Grenadiers	Marco Frapporti	Arnaud Démare	Mattia Bais	Trek–Segafredo
9	Ruben Guerreiro	João Almeida	Arnaud Démare	Ruben Guerreiro	João Almeida	INEOS Grenadiers	Marco Frapporti	Ruben Guerreiro	Salvatore Puccio	Movistar Team
10	Peter Sagan	João Almeida	Arnaud Démare	Ruben Guerreiro	João Almeida	INEOS Grenadiers	Marco Frapporti	Peter Sagan	Salvatore Puccio	Movistar Team
11	Arnaud Démare	João Almeida	Arnaud Démare	Ruben Guerreiro	João Almeida	INEOS Grenadiers	Marco Frapporti	Peter Sagan	Mattia Bais	Movistar Team
12	Jhonatan Narváez	João Almeida	Arnaud Démare	Ruben Guerreiro	João Almeida	INEOS Grenadiers	Marco Frapporti	Peter Sagan	Mattia Bais	AG2R La Mondiale
13	Diego Ulissi	João Almeida	Arnaud Démare	Ruben Guerreiro	João Almeida	INEOS Grenadiers	Simon Pellaud	Simon Pellaud	Mattia Bais	AG2R La Mondiale
14	Filippo Ganna	João Almeida	Arnaud Démare	Ruben Guerreiro	João Almeida	INEOS Grenadiers	Simon Pellaud	Simon Pellaud	Mattia Bais	AG2R La Mondiale
15	Tao Geoghegan Hart	João Almeida	Arnaud Démare	Giovanni Visconti	João Almeida	INEOS Grenadiers	Simon Pellaud	Simon Pellaud	Mattia Bais	AG2R La Mondiale
16	Jan Tratnik	João Almeida	Arnaud Démare	Giovanni Visconti	João Almeida	INEOS Grenadiers	Simon Pellaud	Simon Pellaud	Mattia Bais	Groupama–FDJ
17	Ben O'Connor	João Almeida	Arnaud Démare	Ruben Guerreiro	João Almeida	INEOS Grenadiers	Simon Pellaud	Thomas De Gendt	Mattia Bais	Groupama–FDJ
18	Jai Hindley	Wilco Kelderman	Arnaud Démare	Ruben Guerreiro	Jai Hindley	INEOS Grenadiers	Simon Pellaud	Thomas De Gendt	Mattia Bais	Groupama–FDJ
19	Josef Černý	Wilco Kelderman	Arnaud Démare	Ruben Guerreiro	Jai Hindley	INEOS Grenadiers	Simon Pellaud	Thomas De Gendt	Mattia Bais	Groupama–FDJ
20	Tao Geoghegan Hart	Jai Hindley	Arnaud Démare	Ruben Guerreiro	Jai Hindley	INEOS Grenadiers	Simon Pellaud	Thomas De Gendt	Mattia Bais	Groupama–FDJ
21	Filippo Ganna	Tao Geoghegan Hart	Arnaud Démare	Ruben Guerreiro	Tao Geoghegan Hart	INEOS Grenadiers	Simon Pellaud	Thomas De Gendt	Mattia Bais	Groupama–FDJ
Final		Tao Geoghegan Hart	Arnaud Démare	Ruben Guerreiro	Tao Geoghegan Hart	INEOS Grenadiers	Simon Pellaud	Thomas De Gendt	Mattia Bais	Groupama–FDJ

- On stage 2, João Almeida, who was second in the points classification, wore the cyclamen jersey, because first placed Filippo Ganna wore the pink jersey as the leader of the general classification. Because Ganna and Almeida were also the first two riders in the young rider classification, Mikkel Bjerg, who was third in the young rider classification, wore the white jersey.
- On stage 3, João Almeida, who was second in the young rider classification, wore the white jersey, because first placed Filippo Ganna wore the pink jersey as the leader of the general classification.
- On stages 4–10, Harm Vanhoucke, who was second in the young rider classification, wore the white jersey, because first placed João Almeida wore the pink jersey as the leader of the general classification. On stages 11–14 and 16–18, Jai Hindley wore the white jersey for the same reason, as did Brandon McNulty on stage 15.
- On stage 21, Tao Geoghegan Hart, who was second in the young rider classification, wore the white jersey, because first placed Jai Hindley wore the pink jersey as the leader of the general classification.

== Final classification standings ==
Legend
A pink jersey.	Denotes the winner of the general classification	A blue jersey.	Denotes the winner of the mountains classification
A violet jersey.	Denotes the winner of the points classification	A white jersey.	Denotes the winner of the young rider classification

=== General classification ===
Final general classification (1–10)
Rank	Rider	Team	Time
1	Tao Geoghegan Hart (GBR)	INEOS Grenadiers	85h 40' 21"
2	Jai Hindley (AUS)	Team Sunweb	+ 39"
3	Wilco Kelderman (NED)	Team Sunweb	+ 1' 29"
4	João Almeida (POR)	Deceuninck–Quick-Step	+ 2' 57"
5	Pello Bilbao (ESP)	Bahrain–McLaren	+ 3' 09"
6	Jakob Fuglsang (DEN)	Astana	+ 7' 02"
7	Vincenzo Nibali (ITA)	Trek–Segafredo	+ 8' 15"
8	Patrick Konrad (AUT)	Bora–Hansgrohe	+ 8' 42"
9	Fausto Masnada (ITA)	Deceuninck–Quick-Step	+ 9' 57"
10	Hermann Pernsteiner (AUT)	Bahrain–McLaren	+ 11' 05"

Final general classification (11–133)
Rank	Rider	Team	Time
11	Domenico Pozzovivo (ITA)	NTT Pro Cycling	+ 11' 52"
12	Rafał Majka (POL)	Bora–Hansgrohe	+ 20' 31"
13	Sergio Samitier (ESP)	Movistar Team	+ 35' 29"
14	James Knox (GBR)	Deceuninck–Quick-Step	+ 37' 41"
15	Brandon McNulty (USA)	UAE Team Emirates	+ 38' 10"
16	Aurélien Paret-Peintre (FRA)	AG2R La Mondiale	+ 45' 04"
17	Larry Warbasse (USA)	AG2R La Mondiale	+ 53' 25"
18	Ben Swift (GBR)	INEOS Grenadiers	+ 57' 36"
19	Antonio Pedrero (ESP)	Movistar Team	+ 59' 36"
20	Ben O'Connor (AUS)	NTT Pro Cycling	+ 1h 02' 57"
21	Sam Oomen (NED)	Team Sunweb	+ 1h 03' 46"
22	Ilnur Zakarin (RUS)	CCC Team	+ 1h 06' 11"
23	Matteo Fabbro (ITA)	Bora–Hansgrohe	+ 1h 13' 49"
24	Jonathan Castroviejo (ESP)	INEOS Grenadiers	+ 1h 16' 15"
25	Fabio Felline (ITA)	Astana	+ 1h 25' 14"
26	Martijn Tusveld (NED)	Team Sunweb	+ 1h 25' 34"
27	Attila Valter (HUN)	CCC Team	+ 1h 30' 13"
28	Pieter Serry (BEL)	Deceuninck–Quick-Step	+ 1h 30' 54"
29	Chris Hamilton (AUS)	Team Sunweb	+ 1h 32' 26"
30	Mikkel Frølich Honoré (DEN)	Deceuninck–Quick-Step	+ 1h 34' 49"
31	Jacopo Mosca (ITA)	Trek–Segafredo	+ 1h 48' 45"
32	Tanel Kangert (EST)	EF Pro Cycling	+ 1h 55' 57"
33	Ruben Guerreiro (POR)	EF Pro Cycling	+ 1h 58' 58"
34	Víctor de la Parte (ESP)	CCC Team	+ 2h 00' 42"
35	Rohan Dennis (AUS)	INEOS Grenadiers	+ 2h 04' 26"
36	Louis Meintjes (RSA)	NTT Pro Cycling	+ 2h 05' 51"
37	Antonio Nibali (ITA)	Trek–Segafredo	+ 2h 05' 56"
38	Diego Ulissi (ITA)	UAE Team Emirates	+ 2h 06' 59"
39	François Bidard (FRA)	AG2R La Mondiale	+ 2h 07' 36"
40	Davide Villella (ITA)	Movistar Team	+ 2h 10' 28"
41	Thomas De Gendt (BEL)	Lotto–Soudal	+ 2h 14' 51"
42	Carl Fredrik Hagen (NOR)	Lotto–Soudal	+ 2h 20' 58"
43	Joe Dombrowski (USA)	UAE Team Emirates	+ 2h 23' 09"
44	Jesper Hansen (DEN)	Cofidis	+ 2h 27' 05"
45	Óscar Rodríguez (ESP)	Astana	+ 2h 32' 17"
46	Enrico Battaglin (ITA)	Bahrain–McLaren	+ 2h 32' 44"
47	Sander Armée (BEL)	Lotto–Soudal	+ 2h 32' 48"
48	Daniel Navarro (ESP)	Israel Start-Up Nation	+ 2h 37' 43"
49	Julien Bernard (FRA)	Trek–Segafredo	+ 2h 38' 53"
50	Andrea Vendrame (ITA)	AG2R La Mondiale	+ 2h 39' 38"
51	Alessandro Tonelli (ITA)	Bardiani–CSF–Faizanè	+ 2h 42' 25"
52	Nicola Conci (ITA)	Trek–Segafredo	+ 2h 43' 56"
53	Jonas Gregaard (DEN)	Astana	+ 2h 44' 59"
54	Amanuel Ghebreigzabhier (ERI)	NTT Pro Cycling	+ 2h 47' 05"
55	Geoffrey Bouchard (FRA)	AG2R La Mondiale	+ 2h 47' 38"
56	Salvatore Puccio (ITA)	INEOS Grenadiers	+ 2h 50' 11"
57	Eduardo Sepúlveda (ARG)	Movistar Team	+ 2h 50' 15"
58	Einer Rubio (COL)	Movistar Team	+ 2h 51' 20"
59	Domen Novak (SLO)	Bahrain–McLaren	+ 2h 54' 22"
60	Harm Vanhoucke (BEL)	Lotto–Soudal	+ 2h 55' 25"
61	Filippo Ganna (ITA)	INEOS Grenadiers	+ 3h 03' 16"
62	Jan Tratnik (SLO)	Bahrain–McLaren	+ 3h 05' 27"
63	Stéphane Rossetto (FRA)	Cofidis	+ 3h 08' 54"
64	Joey Rosskopf (USA)	CCC Team	+ 3h 10' 30"
65	Jonathan Caicedo (ECU)	EF Pro Cycling	+ 3h 14' 47"
66	Dario Cataldo (ITA)	Movistar Team	+ 3h 21' 44"
67	Paweł Poljański (POL)	Bora–Hansgrohe	+ 3h 22' 39"
68	Kamil Małecki (POL)	CCC Team	+ 3h 23' 03"
69	Chad Haga (USA)	Team Sunweb	+ 3h 23' 06"
70	Mark Padun (UKR)	Bahrain–McLaren	+ 3h 25' 54"
71	Simon Pellaud (SUI)	Androni Giocattoli–Sidermec	+ 3h 28' 32"
72	Davide Ballerini (ITA)	Deceuninck–Quick-Step	+ 3h 30' 50"
73	Jaakko Hänninen (FIN)	AG2R La Mondiale	+ 3h 35' 23"
74	Simone Ravanelli (ITA)	Androni Giocattoli–Sidermec	+ 3h 38' 15"
75	Simon Clarke (AUS)	EF Pro Cycling	+ 3h 41' 04"
76	Matteo Sobrero (ITA)	NTT Pro Cycling	+ 3h 41' 58"
77	Kilian Frankiny (SUI)	Groupama–FDJ	+ 3h 45' 21"
78	Jefferson Cepeda (ECU)	Androni Giocattoli–Sidermec	+ 3h 49' 05"
79	Héctor Carretero (ESP)	Movistar Team	+ 3h 54' 39"
80	Mathias Le Turnier (FRA)	Cofidis	+ 4h 00' 46"
81	Matthew Holmes (GBR)	Lotto–Soudal	+ 4h 01' 45"
82	Giovanni Carboni (ITA)	Bardiani–CSF–Faizanè	+ 4h 02' 55"
83	Nico Denz (GER)	Team Sunweb	+ 4h 03' 03"
84	Danilo Wyss (SUI)	NTT Pro Cycling	+ 4h 03' 24"
85	Luca Chirico (ITA)	Androni Giocattoli–Sidermec	+ 4h 03' 58"
86	Josef Černý (CZE)	CCC Team	+ 4h 04' 57"
87	Eros Capecchi (ITA)	Bahrain–McLaren	+ 4h 05' 17"
88	Etienne van Empel (NED)	Vini Zabù–Brado–KTM	+ 4h 07' 49"
89	Yukiya Arashiro (JPN)	Bahrain–McLaren	+ 4h 10' 07"
90	Alessandro Bisolti (ITA)	Androni Giocattoli–Sidermec	+ 4h 15' 50"
91	Francesco Romano (ITA)	Bardiani–CSF–Faizanè	+ 4h 18' 52"
92	Peter Sagan (SVK)	Bora–Hansgrohe	+ 4h 21' 56"
93	Lorenzo Rota (ITA)	Vini Zabù–Brado–KTM	+ 4h 22' 59"
94	Cesare Benedetti (ITA)	Bora–Hansgrohe	+ 4h 23' 22"
95	Victor Campenaerts (BEL)	NTT Pro Cycling	+ 4h 27' 30"
96	Edoardo Zardini (ITA)	Vini Zabù–Brado–KTM	+ 4h 30' 02"
97	Mikkel Bjerg (DEN)	UAE Team Emirates	+ 4h 31' 02"
98	Stefano Oldani (ITA)	Lotto–Soudal	+ 4h 33' 10"
99	Josip Rumac (CRO)	Androni Giocattoli–Sidermec	+ 4h 34' 38"
100	Filippo Zana (ITA)	Bardiani–CSF–Faizanè	+ 4h 45' 29"
101	Valerio Conti (ITA)	UAE Team Emirates	+ 4h 45' 35"
102	Mattia Bais (ITA)	Androni Giocattoli–Sidermec	+ 4h 49' 25"
103	Jhonatan Restrepo (COL)	Androni Giocattoli–Sidermec	+ 4h 52' 03"
104	Kamil Gradek (POL)	CCC Team	+ 4h 56' 07"
105	James Whelan (AUS)	EF Pro Cycling	+ 4h 57' 54"
106	Albert Torres (ESP)	Movistar Team	+ 4h 59' 30"
107	Maciej Bodnar (POL)	Bora–Hansgrohe	+ 5h 04' 10"
108	Marco Frapporti (ITA)	Vini Zabù–Brado–KTM	+ 5h 05' 15"
109	Filippo Fiorelli (ITA)	Bardiani–CSF–Faizanè	+ 5h 08' 17"
110	Rodrigo Contreras (COL)	Astana	+ 5h 08' 22"
111	Lachlan Morton (AUS)	EF Pro Cycling	+ 5h 09' 44"
112	Elia Viviani (ITA)	Cofidis	+ 5h 10' 26"
113	Miles Scotson (AUS)	Groupama–FDJ	+ 5h 13' 09"
114	Dylan Sunderland (AUS)	NTT Pro Cycling	+ 5h 13' 54"
115	Simone Consonni (ITA)	Cofidis	+ 5h 16' 07"
116	Simon Guglielmi (FRA)	Groupama–FDJ	+ 5h 16' 48"
117	Adam Hansen (AUS)	Lotto–Soudal	+ 5h 17' 02"
118	Davide Cimolai (ITA)	Israel Start-Up Nation	+ 5h 19' 10"
119	Nathan Haas (AUS)	Cofidis	+ 5h 20' 50"
120	Alex Dowsett (GBR)	Israel Start-Up Nation	+ 5h 23' 04"
121	Arnaud Démare (FRA)	Groupama–FDJ	+ 5h 26' 45"
122	Iljo Keisse (BEL)	Deceuninck–Quick-Step	+ 5h 32' 08"
123	Rick Zabel (GER)	Israel Start-Up Nation	+ 5h 32' 22"
124	Ignatas Konovalovas (LTU)	Groupama–FDJ	+ 5h 36' 34"
125	Giovanni Lonardi (ITA)	Bardiani–CSF–Faizanè	+ 5h 41' 00"
126	Matthias Brändle (AUT)	Israel Start-Up Nation	+ 5h 42' 40"
127	Simone Bevilacqua (ITA)	Vini Zabù–Brado–KTM	+ 5h 45' 25"
128	Jacopo Guarnieri (ITA)	Groupama–FDJ	+ 5h 46' 03"
129	Fabio Mazzucco (ITA)	Bardiani–CSF–Faizanè	+ 5h 48' 10"
130	Marco Mathis (GER)	Cofidis	+ 5h 51' 35"
131	Álvaro Hodeg (COL)	Deceuninck–Quick-Step	+ 5h 53' 47"
132	Guy Sagiv (ISR)	Israel Start-Up Nation	+ 6h 12' 07"
133	Jonathan Dibben (GBR)	Lotto–Soudal	+ 6h 13' 59"

=== Points classification ===
Final points classification (1–10)
Rank	Rider	Team	Points
1	Arnaud Démare (FRA)	Groupama–FDJ	233
2	Peter Sagan (SVK)	Bora–Hansgrohe	184
3	João Almeida (POR)	Deceuninck–Quick-Step	108
4	Filippo Ganna (ITA)	INEOS Grenadiers	87
5	Josef Černý (CZE)	CCC Team	78
6	Andrea Vendrame (ITA)	AG2R La Mondiale	78
7	Diego Ulissi (ITA)	UAE Team Emirates	77
8	Simon Pellaud (SUI)	Androni Giocattoli–Sidermec	70
9	Tao Geoghegan Hart (GBR)	INEOS Grenadiers	66
10	Patrick Konrad (AUT)	Bora–Hansgrohe	61

=== Mountains classification ===
Final mountains classification (1–10)
Rank	Rider	Team	Points
1	Ruben Guerreiro (POR)	EF Pro Cycling	234
2	Tao Geoghegan Hart (GBR)	INEOS Grenadiers	157
3	Thomas De Gendt (BEL)	Lotto–Soudal	122
4	Rohan Dennis (AUS)	INEOS Grenadiers	119
5	Ben O'Connor (AUS)	NTT Pro Cycling	71
6	Jai Hindley (AUS)	Team Sunweb	71
7	Wilco Kelderman (NED)	Team Sunweb	55
8	Filippo Ganna (ITA)	INEOS Grenadiers	48
9	Jonathan Castroviejo (ESP)	INEOS Grenadiers	45
10	Einer Rubio (COL)	Movistar Team	44

=== Young rider classification ===
Final young rider classification (1–10)
Rank	Rider	Team	Time
1	Tao Geoghegan Hart (GBR)	INEOS Grenadiers	85h 40' 21"
2	Jai Hindley (AUS)	Team Sunweb	+ 39"
3	João Almeida (POR)	Deceuninck–Quick-Step	+ 2' 57"
4	Sergio Samitier (ESP)	Movistar Team	+ 35' 29"
5	James Knox (GBR)	Deceuninck–Quick-Step	+ 37' 41"
6	Brandon McNulty (USA)	UAE Team Emirates	+ 38' 10"
7	Aurélien Paret-Peintre (FRA)	AG2R La Mondiale	+ 45' 04"
8	Ben O'Connor (AUS)	NTT Pro Cycling	+ 1h 02' 57"
9	Sam Oomen (NED)	Team Sunweb	+ 1h 03' 46"
10	Matteo Fabbro (ITA)	Bora–Hansgrohe	+ 1h 13' 49"

=== Team classification ===
Final team classification (1–10)
Rank	Team	Time
1	(United Kingdom) INEOS Grenadiers	257h 15' 58"
2	(Belgium) Deceuninck–Quick-Step	+ 22' 32"
3	(Germany) Team Sunweb	+ 28' 50"
4	Bahrain–McLaren	+ 32' 50"
5	(Germany) Bora–Hansgrohe	+ 1h 12' 34"
6	(South Africa) NTT Pro Cycling	+ 1h 49' 59"
7	(France) AG2R La Mondiale	+ 2h 04' 38"
8	(Spain) Movistar Team	+ 2h 08' 26"
9	(Kazakhstan) Astana	+ 2h 29' 44"
10	(United States) Trek–Segafredo	+ 2h 42' 36"

=== Intermediate sprint classification ===
Final intermediate sprint classification (1–10)
Rank	Rider	Team	Points
1	Simon Pellaud (SUI)	Androni Giocattoli–Sidermec	78
2	Thomas De Gendt (BEL)	Lotto–Soudal	56
3	Marco Frapporti (ITA)	Vini Zabù–Brado–KTM	44
4	Mattia Bais (ITA)	Androni Giocattoli–Sidermec	34
5	Jhonatan Restrepo (COL)	Androni Giocattoli–Sidermec	28
6	Andrea Vendrame (ITA)	AG2R La Mondiale	25
7	Peter Sagan (SVK)	Bora–Hansgrohe	21
8	Francesco Romano (ITA)	Bardiani–CSF–Faizanè	20
9	Héctor Carretero (ESP)	Movistar Team	19
10	Matthew Holmes (GBR)	Lotto–Soudal	17

=== Combativity classification ===
Final combativity classification (1–10)
Rank	Rider	Team	Points
1	Thomas De Gendt (BEL)	Lotto–Soudal	55
2	Simon Pellaud (SUI)	Androni Giocattoli–Sidermec	52
3	Tao Geoghegan Hart (GBR)	INEOS Grenadiers	45
4	Ruben Guerreiro (POR)	EF Pro Cycling	45
5	Peter Sagan (SVK)	Bora–Hansgrohe	40
6	Rohan Dennis (AUS)	INEOS Grenadiers	39
7	Filippo Ganna (ITA)	INEOS Grenadiers	37
8	Jai Hindley (AUS)	Team Sunweb	36
9	João Almeida (POR)	Deceuninck–Quick-Step	35
10	Arnaud Démare (FRA)	Groupama–FDJ	33

=== Breakaway classification ===
Final breakaway classification (1–10)
Rank	Rider	Team	Kilometers
1	Mattia Bais (ITA)	Androni Giocattoli–Sidermec	458
2	Marco Frapporti (ITA)	Vini Zabù–Brado–KTM	428
3	Simon Pellaud (SUI)	Androni Giocattoli–Sidermec	352
4	Matthew Holmes (GBR)	Lotto–Soudal	336
5	Salvatore Puccio (ITA)	INEOS Grenadiers	320
6	Alessandro Tonelli (ITA)	Bardiani–CSF–Faizanè	307
7	Filippo Ganna (ITA)	INEOS Grenadiers	304
8	Simone Ravanelli (ITA)	Androni Giocattoli–Sidermec	304
9	Francesco Romano (ITA)	Bardiani–CSF–Faizanè	263
10	Thomas De Gendt (BEL)	Lotto–Soudal	237

=== Fair play classification ===
Final fair play classification (1–10)
Rank	Team	Points
1	(France) Groupama–FDJ	0
2	(Italy) Androni Giocattoli–Sidermec	0.5
3	(Germany) Team Sunweb	20
4	(France) AG2R La Mondiale	20
5	(Poland) CCC Team	20
6	(Germany) Bora–Hansgrohe	40
7	(Belgium) Deceuninck–Quick-Step	60
8	(Italy) Vini Zabù–Brado–KTM	70
9	(United Arab Emirates) UAE Team Emirates	85
10	(South Africa) NTT Pro Cycling	100
