= 2020 Giro d'Italia, Stage 12 to Stage 21 =

Cycling race stages

The 2020 Giro d'Italia was the 103rd edition of the Giro d'Italia, one of cycling's Grand Tours. The Giro began in Monreale with an individual time trial on 3 October, and Stage 12 occurred on 15 October with a stage from Cesenatico. The race finished in Milan on 25 October.

== Classification standings ==
Legend
| A pink jersey. | Denotes the leader of the general classification | A blue jersey. | Denotes the leader of the mountains classification |
| A violet jersey. | Denotes the leader of the points classification | A white jersey. | Denotes the leader of the young rider classification |

== Stage 12 ==
15 October 2020 - Cesenatico to Cesenatico, 204 km (127 mi)

Stage 12 Result
| Rank | Rider | Team | Time |
|---|---|---|---|
| 1 | Jhonatan Narváez (ECU) | INEOS Grenadiers | 5h 31' 24" |
| 2 | Mark Padun (UKR) | Bahrain–McLaren | + 1' 08" |
| 3 | Simon Clarke (AUS) | EF Pro Cycling | + 6' 50" |
| 4 | Joey Rosskopf (USA) | CCC Team | + 7' 30" |
| 5 | Simon Pellaud (SUI) | Androni Giocattoli–Sidermec | + 7' 43" |
| 6 | Brandon McNulty (USA) | UAE Team Emirates | + 8' 25" |
| 7 | Patrick Konrad (AUT) | Bora–Hansgrohe | + 8' 25" |
| 8 | Ruben Guerreiro (POR) | EF Pro Cycling | + 8' 25" |
| 9 | João Almeida (POR) | Deceuninck–Quick-Step | + 8' 25" |
| 10 | Tao Geoghegan Hart (GBR) | INEOS Grenadiers | + 8' 25" |

General classification after Stage 12
| Rank | Rider | Team | Time |
|---|---|---|---|
| 1 | João Almeida (POR) | Deceuninck–Quick-Step | 49h 21' 46" |
| 2 | Wilco Kelderman (NED) | Team Sunweb | + 34" |
| 3 | Pello Bilbao (ESP) | Bahrain–McLaren | + 43" |
| 4 | Domenico Pozzovivo (ITA) | NTT Pro Cycling | + 57" |
| 5 | Vincenzo Nibali (ITA) | Trek–Segafredo | + 1' 01" |
| 6 | Patrick Konrad (AUT) | Bora–Hansgrohe | + 1' 15" |
| 7 | Jai Hindley (AUS) | Team Sunweb | + 1' 19" |
| 8 | Rafał Majka (POL) | Bora–Hansgrohe | + 1' 21" |
| 9 | Fausto Masnada (ITA) | Deceuninck–Quick-Step | + 1' 36" |
| 10 | Jakob Fuglsang (DEN) | Astana | + 2' 20" |

== Stage 13 ==
16 October 2020 - Cervia to Monselice, 192 km (119 mi)

Stage 13 Result
| Rank | Rider | Team | Time |
|---|---|---|---|
| 1 | Diego Ulissi (ITA) | UAE Team Emirates | 4h 22' 18" |
| 2 | João Almeida (POR) | Deceuninck–Quick-Step | + 0" |
| 3 | Patrick Konrad (AUT) | Bora–Hansgrohe | + 0" |
| 4 | Tao Geoghegan Hart (GBR) | INEOS Grenadiers | + 0" |
| 5 | Mikkel Frølich Honoré (DEN) | Deceuninck–Quick-Step | + 0" |
| 6 | Sergio Samitier (ESP) | Movistar Team | + 0" |
| 7 | Jakob Fuglsang (DEN) | Astana | + 0" |
| 8 | Pello Bilbao (ESP) | Bahrain–McLaren | + 0" |
| 9 | Vincenzo Nibali (ITA) | Trek–Segafredo | + 0" |
| 10 | Jai Hindley (AUS) | Team Sunweb | + 0" |

General classification after Stage 13
| Rank | Rider | Team | Time |
|---|---|---|---|
| 1 | João Almeida (POR) | Deceuninck–Quick-Step | 53h 43' 58" |
| 2 | Wilco Kelderman (NED) | Team Sunweb | + 40" |
| 3 | Pello Bilbao (ESP) | Bahrain–McLaren | + 49" |
| 4 | Domenico Pozzovivo (ITA) | NTT Pro Cycling | + 1' 03" |
| 5 | Vincenzo Nibali (ITA) | Trek–Segafredo | + 1' 07" |
| 6 | Patrick Konrad (AUT) | Bora–Hansgrohe | + 1' 17" |
| 7 | Jai Hindley (AUS) | Team Sunweb | + 1' 25" |
| 8 | Rafał Majka (POL) | Bora–Hansgrohe | + 1' 27" |
| 9 | Fausto Masnada (ITA) | Deceuninck–Quick-Step | + 1' 42" |
| 10 | Jakob Fuglsang (DEN) | Astana | + 2' 26" |

== Stage 14 ==
17 October 2020 - Conegliano to Valdobbiadene, 34.1 km (21.2 mi) (ITT)

Stage 14 Result
| Rank | Rider | Team | Time |
|---|---|---|---|
| 1 | Filippo Ganna (ITA) | INEOS Grenadiers | 42' 40" |
| 2 | Rohan Dennis (AUS) | INEOS Grenadiers | + 26" |
| 3 | Brandon McNulty (USA) | UAE Team Emirates | + 1' 09" |
| 4 | Thomas De Gendt (BEL) | Lotto–Soudal | + 1' 11" |
| 5 | Josef Černý (CZE) | CCC Team | + 1' 16" |
| 6 | João Almeida (POR) | Deceuninck–Quick-Step | + 1' 31" |
| 7 | Tanel Kangert (EST) | EF Pro Cycling | + 1' 33" |
| 8 | Jonathan Castroviejo (ESP) | INEOS Grenadiers | + 1' 44" |
| 9 | Wilco Kelderman (NED) | Team Sunweb | + 1' 47" |
| 10 | Jan Tratnik (SLO) | Bahrain–McLaren | + 2' 00" |

General classification after Stage 14
| Rank | Rider | Team | Time |
|---|---|---|---|
| 1 | João Almeida (POR) | Deceuninck–Quick-Step | 54h 28' 09" |
| 2 | Wilco Kelderman (NED) | Team Sunweb | + 56" |
| 3 | Pello Bilbao (ESP) | Bahrain–McLaren | + 2' 11" |
| 4 | Brandon McNulty (USA) | UAE Team Emirates | + 2' 23" |
| 5 | Vincenzo Nibali (ITA) | Trek–Segafredo | + 2' 30" |
| 6 | Rafał Majka (POL) | Bora–Hansgrohe | + 2' 33" |
| 7 | Domenico Pozzovivo (ITA) | NTT Pro Cycling | + 2' 33" |
| 8 | Fausto Masnada (ITA) | Deceuninck–Quick-Step | + 3' 11" |
| 9 | Patrick Konrad (AUT) | Bora–Hansgrohe | + 3' 17" |
| 10 | Jai Hindley (AUS) | Team Sunweb | + 3' 33" |

== Stage 15 ==
18 October 2020 - Base Aerea Rivolto to Piancavallo, 185 km (115 mi)

Stage 15 Result
| Rank | Rider | Team | Time |
|---|---|---|---|
| 1 | Tao Geoghegan Hart (GBR) | INEOS Grenadiers | 4h 58' 52" |
| 2 | Wilco Kelderman (NED) | Team Sunweb | + 2" |
| 3 | Jai Hindley (AUS) | Team Sunweb | + 4" |
| 4 | João Almeida (POR) | Deceuninck–Quick-Step | + 37" |
| 5 | Rafał Majka (POL) | Bora–Hansgrohe | + 1' 22" |
| 6 | Patrick Konrad (AUT) | Bora–Hansgrohe | + 1' 29" |
| 7 | James Knox (GBR) | Deceuninck–Quick-Step | + 1' 36" |
| 8 | Pello Bilbao (ESP) | Bahrain–McLaren | + 1' 36" |
| 9 | Jakob Fuglsang (DEN) | Astana | + 1' 36" |
| 10 | Vincenzo Nibali (ITA) | Trek–Segafredo | + 1' 36" |

General classification after Stage 15
| Rank | Rider | Team | Time |
|---|---|---|---|
| 1 | João Almeida (POR) | Deceuninck–Quick-Step | 59h 27' 38" |
| 2 | Wilco Kelderman (NED) | Team Sunweb | + 15" |
| 3 | Jai Hindley (AUS) | Team Sunweb | + 2' 56" |
| 4 | Tao Geoghegan Hart (GBR) | INEOS Grenadiers | + 2' 57" |
| 5 | Pello Bilbao (ESP) | Bahrain–McLaren | + 3' 10" |
| 6 | Rafał Majka (POL) | Bora–Hansgrohe | + 3' 18" |
| 7 | Vincenzo Nibali (ITA) | Trek–Segafredo | + 3' 29" |
| 8 | Domenico Pozzovivo (ITA) | NTT Pro Cycling | + 3' 50" |
| 9 | Patrick Konrad (AUT) | Bora–Hansgrohe | + 4' 09" |
| 10 | Fausto Masnada (ITA) | Deceuninck–Quick-Step | + 4' 12" |

== Rest day 2 ==
19 October 2020

== Stage 16 ==
20 October 2020 - Udine to San Daniele del Friuli, 229 km (142 mi)

Stage 16 Result
| Rank | Rider | Team | Time |
|---|---|---|---|
| 1 | Jan Tratnik (SLO) | Bahrain–McLaren | 6h 04' 36" |
| 2 | Ben O'Connor (AUS) | NTT Pro Cycling | + 7" |
| 3 | Enrico Battaglin (ITA) | Bahrain–McLaren | + 1' 14" |
| 4 | Kamil Małecki (POL) | CCC Team | + 1' 14" |
| 5 | Ben Swift (GBR) | INEOS Grenadiers | + 1' 14" |
| 6 | Andrea Vendrame (ITA) | AG2R La Mondiale | + 1' 21" |
| 7 | Geoffrey Bouchard (FRA) | AG2R La Mondiale | + 1' 21" |
| 8 | Matteo Fabbro (ITA) | Bora–Hansgrohe | + 1' 25" |
| 9 | Manuele Boaro (ITA) | Astana | + 1' 33" |
| 10 | Alessandro Tonelli (ITA) | Bardiani–CSF–Faizanè | + 1' 37" |

General classification after Stage 16
| Rank | Rider | Team | Time |
|---|---|---|---|
| 1 | João Almeida (POR) | Deceuninck–Quick-Step | 65h 45' 08" |
| 2 | Wilco Kelderman (NED) | Team Sunweb | + 17" |
| 3 | Jai Hindley (AUS) | Team Sunweb | + 2' 58" |
| 4 | Tao Geoghegan Hart (GBR) | INEOS Grenadiers | + 2' 59" |
| 5 | Pello Bilbao (ESP) | Bahrain–McLaren | + 3' 12" |
| 6 | Rafał Majka (POL) | Bora–Hansgrohe | + 3' 20" |
| 7 | Vincenzo Nibali (ITA) | Trek–Segafredo | + 3' 31" |
| 8 | Domenico Pozzovivo (ITA) | NTT Pro Cycling | + 3' 52" |
| 9 | Patrick Konrad (AUT) | Bora–Hansgrohe | + 4' 11" |
| 10 | Fausto Masnada (ITA) | Deceuninck–Quick-Step | + 4' 24" |

== Stage 17 ==
21 October 2020 - Bassano del Grappa to Madonna di Campiglio, 203 km (126 mi)

Stage 17 Result
| Rank | Rider | Team | Time |
|---|---|---|---|
| 1 | Ben O'Connor (AUS) | NTT Pro Cycling | 5h 50' 59" |
| 2 | Hermann Pernsteiner (AUT) | Bahrain–McLaren | + 31" |
| 3 | Thomas De Gendt (BEL) | Lotto–Soudal | + 1' 10" |
| 4 | Ilnur Zakarin (RUS) | CCC Team | + 1' 13" |
| 5 | Kilian Frankiny (SUI) | Groupama–FDJ | + 1' 55" |
| 6 | Harm Vanhoucke (BEL) | Lotto–Soudal | + 2' 49" |
| 7 | Davide Villella (ITA) | Movistar Team | + 3' 29" |
| 8 | Óscar Rodríguez (ESP) | Astana | + 3' 29" |
| 9 | Amanuel Ghebreigzabhier (ERI) | NTT Pro Cycling | + 3' 30" |
| 10 | Jesper Hansen (DEN) | Cofidis | + 4' 32" |

General classification after Stage 17
| Rank | Rider | Team | Time |
|---|---|---|---|
| 1 | João Almeida (POR) | Deceuninck–Quick-Step | 71h 41' 18" |
| 2 | Wilco Kelderman (NED) | Team Sunweb | + 17" |
| 3 | Jai Hindley (AUS) | Team Sunweb | + 2' 58" |
| 4 | Tao Geoghegan Hart (GBR) | INEOS Grenadiers | + 2' 59" |
| 5 | Pello Bilbao (ESP) | Bahrain–McLaren | + 3' 12" |
| 6 | Rafał Majka (POL) | Bora–Hansgrohe | + 3' 20" |
| 7 | Vincenzo Nibali (ITA) | Trek–Segafredo | + 3' 31" |
| 8 | Domenico Pozzovivo (ITA) | NTT Pro Cycling | + 3' 52" |
| 9 | Patrick Konrad (AUT) | Bora–Hansgrohe | + 4' 11" |
| 10 | Fausto Masnada (ITA) | Deceuninck–Quick-Step | + 4' 26" |

== Stage 18 ==
22 October 2020 - Pinzolo to Laghi di Cancano, 207 km (129 mi)

Stage 18 Result
| Rank | Rider | Team | Time |
|---|---|---|---|
| 1 | Jai Hindley (AUS) | Team Sunweb | 6h 03' 03" |
| 2 | Tao Geoghegan Hart (GBR) | INEOS Grenadiers | + 0" |
| 3 | Pello Bilbao (ESP) | Bahrain–McLaren | + 46" |
| 4 | Jakob Fuglsang (DEN) | Astana | + 1' 25" |
| 5 | Wilco Kelderman (NED) | Team Sunweb | + 2' 18" |
| 6 | Patrick Konrad (AUT) | Bora–Hansgrohe | + 4' 04" |
| 7 | João Almeida (POR) | Deceuninck–Quick-Step | + 4' 51" |
| 8 | Vincenzo Nibali (ITA) | Trek–Segafredo | + 4' 51" |
| 9 | Hermann Pernsteiner (AUT) | Bahrain–McLaren | + 4' 51" |
| 10 | Fausto Masnada (ITA) | Deceuninck–Quick-Step | + 4' 55" |

General classification after Stage 18
| Rank | Rider | Team | Time |
|---|---|---|---|
| 1 | Wilco Kelderman (NED) | Team Sunweb | 77h 46' 56" |
| 2 | Jai Hindley (AUS) | Team Sunweb | + 12" |
| 3 | Tao Geoghegan Hart (GBR) | INEOS Grenadiers | + 15" |
| 4 | Pello Bilbao (ESP) | Bahrain–McLaren | + 1' 19" |
| 5 | João Almeida (POR) | Deceuninck–Quick-Step | + 2' 16" |
| 6 | Jakob Fuglsang (DEN) | Astana | + 3' 59" |
| 7 | Patrick Konrad (AUT) | Bora–Hansgrohe | + 5' 40" |
| 8 | Vincenzo Nibali (ITA) | Trek–Segafredo | + 5' 47" |
| 9 | Fausto Masnada (ITA) | Deceuninck–Quick-Step | + 6' 46" |
| 10 | Rafał Majka (POL) | Bora–Hansgrohe | + 7' 28" |

== Stage 19 ==
23 October 2020 - ~~Morbegno~~ Abbiategrasso to Asti, 124.5 km (77.4 mi)

Stage 19 Result
| Rank | Rider | Team | Time |
|---|---|---|---|
| 1 | Josef Černý (CZE) | CCC Team | 2h 30' 40" |
| 2 | Victor Campenaerts (BEL) | NTT Pro Cycling | + 18" |
| 3 | Jacopo Mosca (ITA) | Trek–Segafredo | + 26" |
| 4 | Simon Clarke (AUS) | EF Pro Cycling | + 26" |
| 5 | Iljo Keisse (BEL) | Deceuninck–Quick-Step | + 26" |
| 6 | Sander Armée (BEL) | Lotto–Soudal | + 26" |
| 7 | Albert Torres (ESP) | Movistar Team | + 1' 10" |
| 8 | Simon Pellaud (SUI) | Androni Giocattoli–Sidermec | + 1' 10" |
| 9 | Giovanni Carboni (ITA) | Bardiani–CSF–Faizanè | + 1' 10" |
| 10 | Alex Dowsett (GBR) | Israel Start-Up Nation | + 1' 10" |

General classification after Stage 19
| Rank | Rider | Team | Time |
|---|---|---|---|
| 1 | Wilco Kelderman (NED) | Team Sunweb | 80h 29' 19" |
| 2 | Jai Hindley (AUS) | Team Sunweb | + 12" |
| 3 | Tao Geoghegan Hart (GBR) | INEOS Grenadiers | + 15" |
| 4 | Pello Bilbao (ESP) | Bahrain–McLaren | + 1' 19" |
| 5 | João Almeida (POR) | Deceuninck–Quick-Step | + 2' 16" |
| 6 | Jakob Fuglsang (DEN) | Astana | + 3' 59" |
| 7 | Patrick Konrad (AUT) | Bora–Hansgrohe | + 5' 40" |
| 8 | Vincenzo Nibali (ITA) | Trek–Segafredo | + 5' 47" |
| 9 | Fausto Masnada (ITA) | Deceuninck–Quick-Step | + 6' 46" |
| 10 | Rafał Majka (POL) | Bora–Hansgrohe | + 7' 28" |

== Stage 20 ==
24 October 2020 - Alba to Sestriere, 190 km (120 mi)

Stage 20 Result
| Rank | Rider | Team | Time |
|---|---|---|---|
| 1 | Tao Geoghegan Hart (GBR) | INEOS Grenadiers | 4h 52' 45" |
| 2 | Jai Hindley (AUS) | Team Sunweb | + 0" |
| 3 | Rohan Dennis (AUS) | INEOS Grenadiers | + 25" |
| 4 | João Almeida (POR) | Deceuninck–Quick-Step | + 1' 01" |
| 5 | Andrea Vendrame (ITA) | AG2R La Mondiale | + 1' 34" |
| 6 | Einer Rubio (COL) | Movistar Team | + 1' 35" |
| 7 | Pello Bilbao (ESP) | Bahrain–McLaren | + 1' 35" |
| 8 | Wilco Kelderman (NED) | Team Sunweb | + 1' 35" |
| 9 | Attila Valter (HUN) | CCC Team | + 1' 48" |
| 10 | James Knox (GBR) | Deceuninck–Quick-Step | + 2' 00" |

General classification after Stage 20
| Rank | Rider | Team | Time |
|---|---|---|---|
| 1 | Jai Hindley (AUS) | Team Sunweb | 85h 22' 07" |
| 2 | Tao Geoghegan Hart (GBR) | INEOS Grenadiers | + 0" |
| 3 | Wilco Kelderman (NED) | Team Sunweb | + 1' 32" |
| 4 | Pello Bilbao (ESP) | Bahrain–McLaren | + 2' 51" |
| 5 | João Almeida (POR) | Deceuninck–Quick-Step | + 3' 14" |
| 6 | Jakob Fuglsang (DEN) | Astana | + 6' 32" |
| 7 | Vincenzo Nibali (ITA) | Trek–Segafredo | + 7' 46" |
| 8 | Patrick Konrad (AUT) | Bora–Hansgrohe | + 8' 05" |
| 9 | Fausto Masnada (ITA) | Deceuninck–Quick-Step | + 9' 24" |
| 10 | Hermann Pernsteiner (AUT) | Bahrain–McLaren | + 10' 08" |

== Stage 21 ==
25 October 2020 - Cernusco sul Naviglio to Milan, 15.7 km (9.8 mi) (ITT)

Stage 21 Result
| Rank | Rider | Team | Time |
|---|---|---|---|
| 1 | Filippo Ganna (ITA) | INEOS Grenadiers | 17' 16" |
| 2 | Victor Campenaerts (BEL) | NTT Pro Cycling | + 32" |
| 3 | Rohan Dennis (AUS) | INEOS Grenadiers | + 32" |
| 4 | João Almeida (POR) | Deceuninck–Quick-Step | + 41" |
| 5 | Miles Scotson (AUS) | Groupama–FDJ | + 41" |
| 6 | Josef Černý (CZE) | CCC Team | + 44" |
| 7 | Chad Haga (USA) | Team Sunweb | + 44" |
| 8 | Brandon McNulty (USA) | UAE Team Emirates | + 46" |
| 9 | Kamil Gradek (POL) | CCC Team | + 47" |
| 10 | Jan Tratnik (SLO) | Bahrain–McLaren | + 47" |

Final general classification
| Rank | Rider | Team | Time |
|---|---|---|---|
| 1 | Tao Geoghegan Hart (GBR) | INEOS Grenadiers | 85h 40' 21" |
| 2 | Jai Hindley (AUS) | Team Sunweb | + 39" |
| 3 | Wilco Kelderman (NED) | Team Sunweb | + 1' 29" |
| 4 | João Almeida (POR) | Deceuninck–Quick-Step | + 2' 57" |
| 5 | Pello Bilbao (ESP) | Bahrain–McLaren | + 3' 09" |
| 6 | Jakob Fuglsang (DEN) | Astana | + 7' 02" |
| 7 | Vincenzo Nibali (ITA) | Trek–Segafredo | + 8' 15" |
| 8 | Patrick Konrad (AUT) | Bora–Hansgrohe | + 8' 42" |
| 9 | Fausto Masnada (ITA) | Deceuninck–Quick-Step | + 9' 57" |
| 10 | Hermann Pernsteiner (AUT) | Bahrain–McLaren | + 11' 05" |
