= Otura =

Otura may refer to the following places:

- Villa de Otura, Granada, Spain
- Stará Turá (Hungarian: Ótura), Trenčín Region, Slovakia
