= Alejandro Ropero =

Spanish cyclist

Personal information
- Born: 17 April 1998 (age 28) Villa de Otura, Spain
- Height: 1.71 m (5 ft 7 in)
- Weight: 61 kg (134 lb)

Cycling career
- Sport: Cycling
- Current team: Gomur–Cantabria Infinita
- Discipline: Road
- Role: Rider

Amateur teams
- 2014: CC Churriana de la Vega
- 2015: Fenavin
- 2016–2017: RH+–Polartec–Fundación Contador
- 2018–2019: Polartec–Kometa Amateur
- 2018: Polartec–Kometa (stagiaire)
- 2024–: Gomur–Cantabria Infinita

Professional teams
- 2019–2020: Tirol KTM Cycling Team
- 2020–2022: Kometa Xstra Cycling Team
- 2023: Electro Hiper Europa

Alejandro Ropero (born 17 April 1998) is a Spanish racing cyclist, who currently rides for club team Gomur–Cantabria Infinita.

== Major results ==
2019
1st Stage 4 Vuelta a Zamora
1st Stage 1 Vuelta al Bidasoa
2nd Overall Tour of Galicia
2020
7th Overall Giro Ciclistico d'Italia

1st Stage 1

2021
9th Giro dell'Appennino
2023
4th Clássica da Arrábida
