= Tao Geoghegan Hart =

British road cyclist

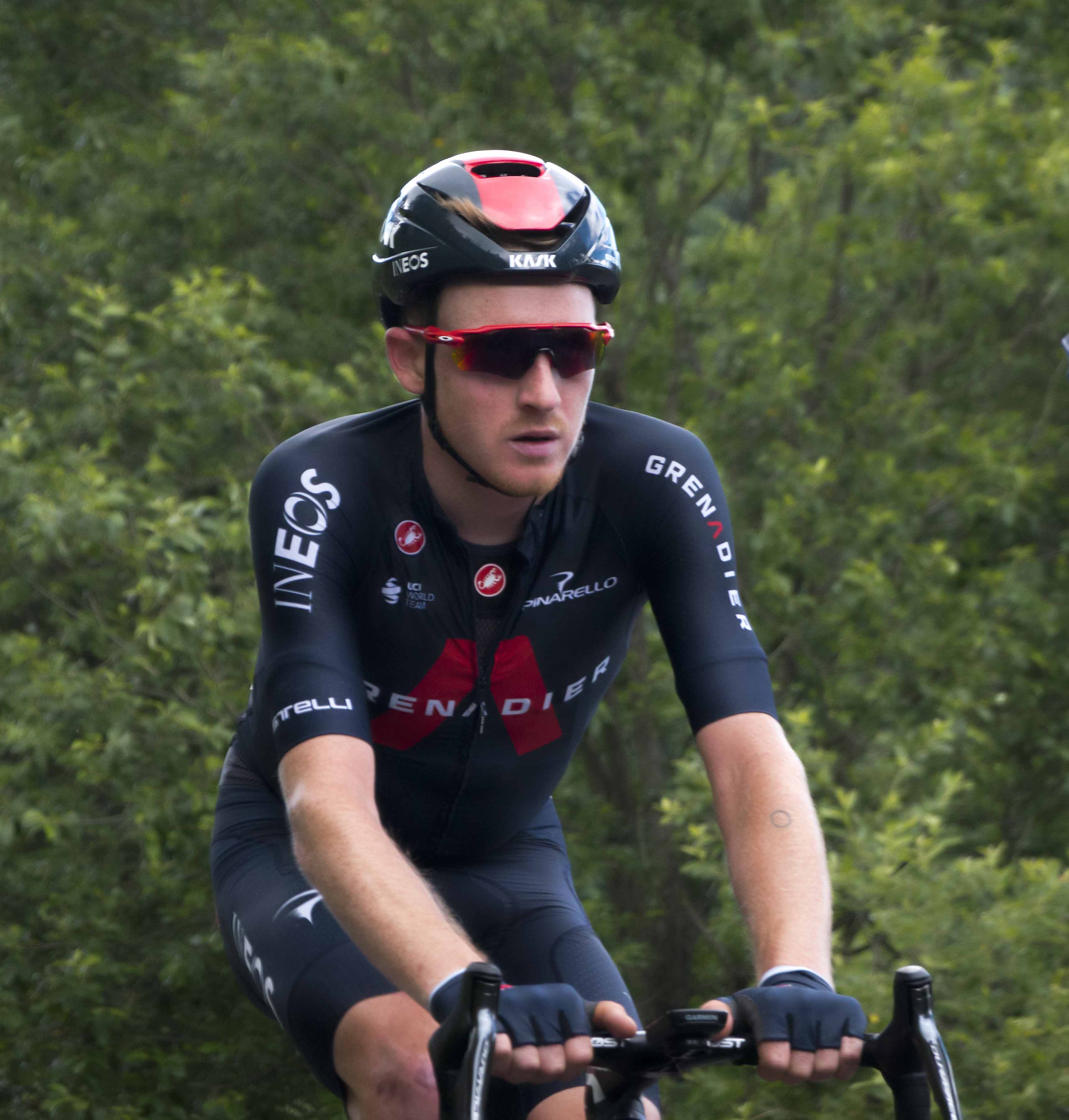
- Geoghegan Hart at the 2021 Tour de France

Personal information
- Full name: Tao Geoghegan Hart
- Born: 30 March 1995 (age 31) Holloway, London, England, United Kingdom
- Height: 1.83 m (6 ft 0 in)
- Weight: 67 kg (148 lb; 10 st 8 lb)

Cycling career
- Sport: Cycling
- Current team: Lidl–Trek
- Disciplines: Road; Track
- Role: Rider
- Rider type: Climber

Professional teams
- 2014–2016: Bissell Development Team
- → 2015: Team Sky (stagiaire)
- 2017–2023: Team Sky
- 2024–2026: Lidl–Trek
- 2027–: EF Education–EasyPost

Major wins
- Grand Tours Giro d'Italia General classification (2020) Young rider classification (2020) 2 individual stages (2020) Stage races Tour of the Alps (2023)

Tao Geoghegan Hart (/ˈteɪoʊ ˌɡeɪɡən ˈhɑːrt/ TAY-oh GAY-gən HART; born 30 March 1995) is a British cyclist who currently rides for UCI WorldTeam Lidl–Trek. He rode for Team Sky as a stagiaire in late 2015, and joined the team permanently for the 2017 season.

Geoghegan Hart won the 2020 Giro d'Italia, taking the jersey following the final day time-trial and becoming the first winner in the history of the Giro never to wear the maglia rosa until he had won it outright. As such, he was the fifth British rider to win a grand tour (after Bradley Wiggins, Chris Froome, Geraint Thomas and Simon Yates), the second Briton to win the Giro (after Froome in 2018) and the youngest British rider to win a grand tour.

== Early and personal life ==
Tao Geoghegan Hart was born in Holloway, London. The eldest of 4 siblings, he grew up in the London Fields neighbourhood of Hackney, attending Gayhurst primary school. His family is of Scottish and Irish ancestry. He played football until he was 12 and was a goalkeeper. He was brought up as a vegetarian. He also became a keen swimmer after starting secondary school at Stoke Newington School; on 28 July 2008, when he was 13, he was part of a cross-Channel swimming relay with Clissold Swimming Club. The team of six completed the crossing in 11 hours 34 minutes.

Geoghegan Hart learnt to ride a bike when he was five, and first had a BMX cycle as a young boy. He has said he recalls being impressed when attending the 2007 Tour de France prologue in London as a spectator. He gained a serious interest in cycling after his father bought him a second-hand women's Specialized Dolce when he was 13. He took part in the Dunwich Dynamo cycle ride in the summer of 2008. In 2009, Tao attended the launch of Team Sky, joining an amateur peloton riding behind Bradley Wiggins and Chris Froome. He also took a Saturday job at Condor Cycles that year, and was supported with bicycles, wheels, and kit by the London bicycle manufacturer. He was also sponsored by London company Rapha as a young rider.

Geoghegan Hart is married to Lotte Wubben-Moy, a professional football player who, like Geoghegan Hart, also grew up in East London and also attended Stoke Newington School.

== Career ==
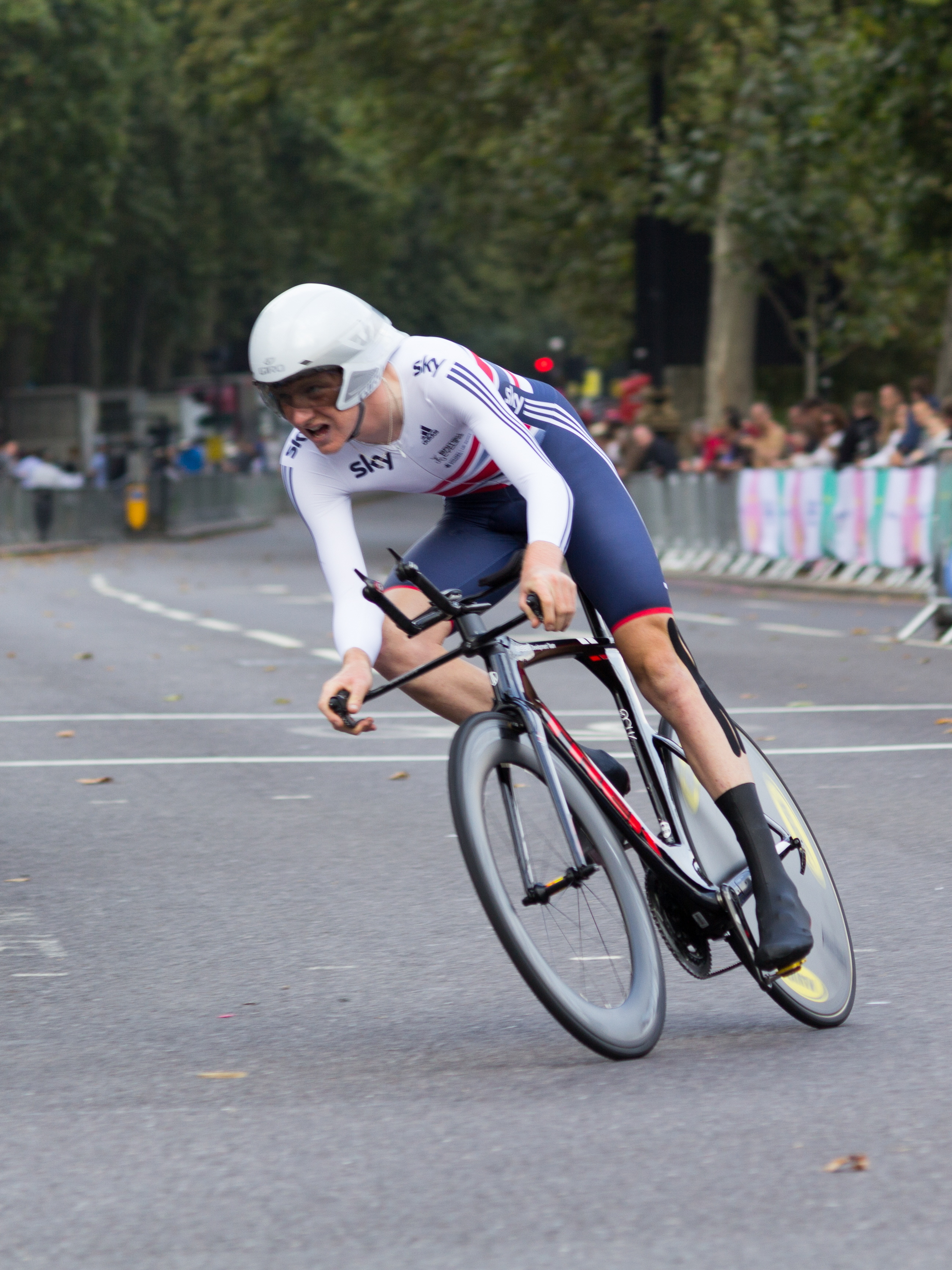
Geoghegan Hart at the 2014 Tour of Britain.

Geoghegan Hart started competitive racing at the national level in 2010 with the East London-based club Cycling Club Hackney. He joined the British Cycling under-16 development programme in 2011, followed by the Olympic Development Programme for under-18s. He also competed internationally, and attracted attention for victories abroad and podium places at races including 3rd place at the 2013 Paris–Roubaix Juniors. He also took a clean sweep of mountains, points and general classification jerseys at the Giro Internazionale della Lunigiana in 2013.

In 2014, Geoghegan Hart rode for Axel Merckx's Bissell Development Team. He finished third in Liège–Bastogne–Liège U23 and rode his first UCI 2. HC ranked race at the Tour of California in May 2014 before completing a second at the Tour of Britain in September when, riding for the Great Britain national team, he finished 15th overall.

He was named in Scotland's Commonwealth Games teams for both Glasgow 2014 and Gold Coast 2018, but was unable to fit the competition into his race schedule on either occasion.

In 2015, he again finished third in Liège–Bastogne–Liège U23, eighth overall in the Tour of the Gila, 13th overall in the Tour of California and seventh overall in the USA Pro Cycling Challenge, winning the best young rider classification. He also rode as a Stagiaire for Team Sky in 2015, but opted to stay at Under-23 level for the 2016 season.

=== Team Sky / Ineos Grenadiers ===
In August 2016, Geoghegan Hart was confirmed as having signed for Team Sky for the 2017 season. In August 2018, he was named in the startlist for the 2018 Vuelta a España. In May 2019, he was named in the startlist for the 2019 Giro d'Italia.

On 18 October 2020, Geoghegan Hart won his first stage of a Grand Tour, taking stage 15 of the Giro d'Italia on the Alpine summit finish of the Piancavallo. Following in the steps of previous winners Marco Pantani and Mikel Landa, Geoghegan Hart rode away from the remaining peloton with the Sunweb duo of Jai Hindley and Wilco Kelderman, out-sprinting Kelderman at the line to take the stage win. The result also took Geoghegan Hart up to 4th in the General Classification of the race ahead of the second rest day. On 24 October 2020, he won his second stage of the Giro d'Italia, taking 2nd overall on the same time as the leader, and on the final stage on the following day, he finished 13th in a time-trial in a time which won the Giro d'Italia. In taking the jersey following the final day time-trial, he became the first rider in Giro history to win the overall title having never carried the pink jersey during the race itself.

Geoghegan Hart had a few tough seasons after his Giro d'Italia win in 2020 having to deal with COVID and repeated infections afterwards. He finished 60th on GC in the 2021 Tour de France and notched only 19th in the 2022 Vuelta a España.

He returned to form in early 2023 after winning the 4th stage of the Volta a la Comunitat Valenciana, his first win in over 2 years after the Giro victory. He finished 3rd overall on GC, and continued on an upward trajectory by securing a 3rd place on GC in the 2023 Tirreno–Adriatico in March 2023. His good form continued in 2023 as he went on to win the opening stage of the Tour of the Alps on 17 April and followed up by finishing first on stage 2 just a day later. He finished the race first in GC on 21 April and claimed top spot in the points classification.

Going into the 2023 Giro d'Italia, Geoghegan Hart was designated as co-leader for Ineos Grenadiers alongside Geraint Thomas. However, a fractured hip sustained in a crash on Stage 11 required surgery, forcing him to withdraw from the race and ultimately ruling him out for the remainder of the 2023 season.

=== Lidl–Trek ===
In August 2023, it was announced that Geoghegan Hart would leave INEOS Grenadiers, having signed a three-year contract with Lidl–Trek.

=== EF Education–EasyPost ===
In October 2026, EF Education–EasyPost announced the signing of Geoghegen Hart ahead of the 2027 season.

== Major results ==
2012
3rd Overall National Junior Road Series
2013
1st Overall Giro della Lunigiana

1st Points classification
1st Mountains classification
1st Stage 1

1st Overall Tour of Istria

1st Stage 2

3rd Road race, National Junior Road Championships
3rd Paris–Roubaix Juniors
5th Overall Course de la Paix Juniors
8th Overall Keizer der Juniores
9th Overall Driedaagse van Axel
2014
3rd Liège–Bastogne–Liège Espoirs
10th Overall Tour de l'Avenir
2015
3rd Time trial, National Under-23 Road Championships
3rd Liège–Bastogne–Liège Espoirs
6th Trofeo PIVA
7th Overall USA Pro Cycling Challenge

1st Young rider classification

8th Overall Tour of the Gila
9th Beaumont Trophy
2016
National Under-23 Road Championships

1st Road race
2nd Time trial

1st Trofeo PIVA
2nd Overall Tour de Savoie Mont-Blanc

1st Stage 5

2nd Overall Course de la Paix Under-23
6th Overall Tour of the Gila

1st Young rider classification

6th Overall Tour de l'Avenir
6th Overall Volta ao Alentejo
7th Gran Premio Palio del Recioto
8th Giro del Belvedere
9th Time trial, UEC European Under-23 Road Championships
10th Ruota d'Oro
2017
2nd Road race, National Under-23 Road Championships
4th Time trial, National Road Championships
4th Trofeo Serra de Tramuntana
8th Overall Tour of California
8th Overall Tour de Yorkshire
2018
1st Stage 3 (TTT) Critérium du Dauphiné
5th Overall Tour of California
5th Overall Vuelta a Burgos
2019 (2 pro wins)
2nd Overall Tour of the Alps

1st Stages 1 & 4

5th Overall Tour de Pologne
8th Tre Valli Varesine
Combativity award Stage 20 Vuelta a España
2020 (3)
1st Overall Giro d'Italia

1st Young rider classification
1st Stages 15 & 20

3rd Overall Volta a la Comunitat Valenciana
2021
9th Memorial Marco Pantani
10th Overall Critérium du Dauphiné
10th Overall Tour des Alpes-Maritimes et du Var
2022
5th Overall Tour of Norway
8th Overall Critérium du Dauphiné
2023 (4)
1st Overall Tour of the Alps

1st Points classification
1st Stages 1 & 2

3rd Overall Volta a la Comunitat Valenciana

1st Stage 4

3rd Overall Tirreno–Adriatico
6th Overall Vuelta a Andalucía
Giro d'Italia

Held after Stage 1

2024
9th Overall Tour de Romandie
2025
3rd Overall Tour of Slovenia
9th Overall Volta ao Algarve

=== General classification results timeline ===
Grand Tour general classification results
Grand Tour	2017	2018	2019	2020	2021	2022	2023	2024	2025
Giro d'Italia	—	—	DNF	1	—	—	DNF	—	—
Tour de France	—	—	—	—	60	—	—	—	—
Vuelta a España	—	62	20	—	—	19	—	62	—
Major stage race general classification results
Race	2017	2018	2019	2020	2021	2022	2023	2024	2025
Paris–Nice	—	—	32	—	DNF	—	—	—	—
Tirreno–Adriatico	—	—	—	30	—	DNF	3	29	—
Volta a Catalunya	—	53	—	NH	—	—	—	—	DNF
Tour of the Basque Country	90	68	—	NH	DNF	29	—	43	—
Tour de Romandie	—	—	—	NH	—	—	—	9	—
Critérium du Dauphiné	—	13	—	—	10	8	—	DNF	—
Tour de Suisse	14	—	—	NH	—	—	—	—	25

Legend
—	Did not compete
DNF	Did not finish
NH	Not held
IP	In progress
