= Puente de Génave =

Puente de Génave, Spain
- city
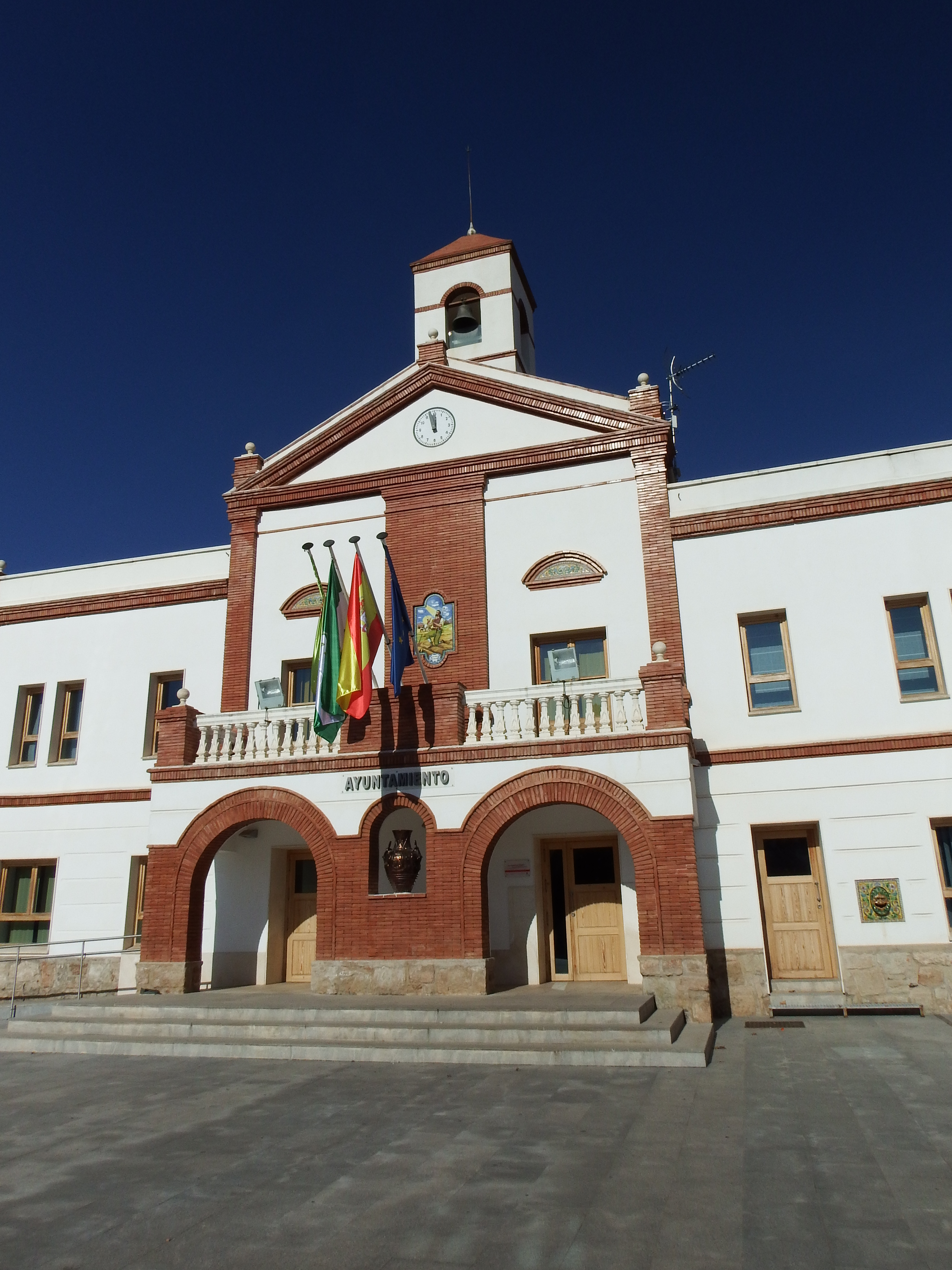
- Town Hall of Puente de Génave

- Coat of arms

- Location in the Province of Jaén Puente de Génave (Andalusia) Puente de Génave (Spain)
- Coordinates: 38°21′N 02°48′W
- Country: Spain
- Autonomous community: Andalusia
- Province: Jaén
- Municipality: Puente de Génave

Area
  - Total: 38 km^{2} (15 sq mi)
- Elevation: 540 m (1,770 ft)

Population (2025-01-01)
  - Total: 2,191
  - Density: 58/km^{2} (150/sq mi)
- Time zone: UTC+1 (CET)
  - Summer (DST): UTC+2 (CEST)

Puente de Génave is a city located in the province of Jaén, Spain. According to the 2005 census (INE), the city had a population of 2,119 inhabitants.

== See also ==
- List of municipalities in Jaén
