= Santiago-Pontones =

Santiago-Pontones, Spain
- city
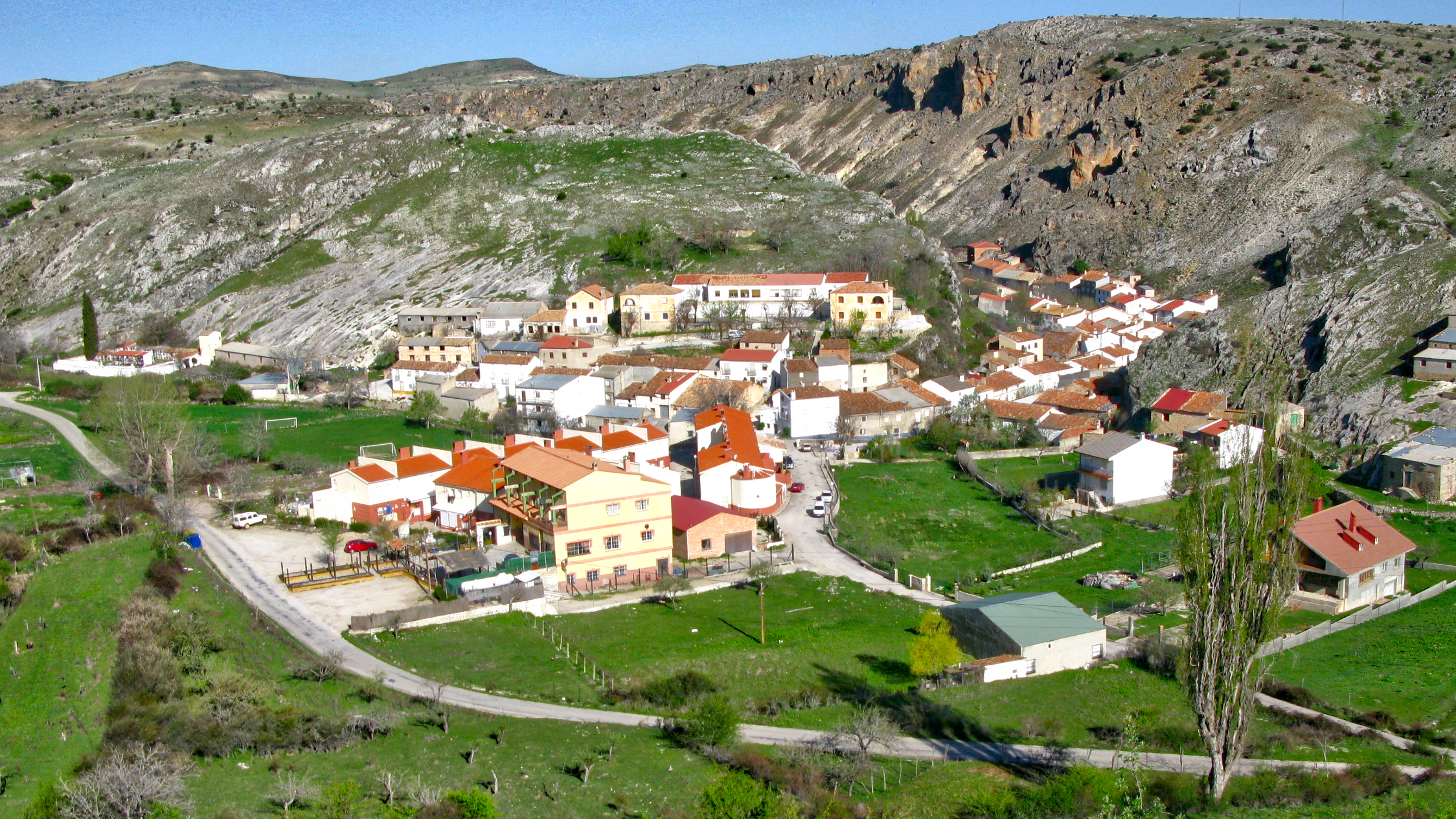

- Coat of arms

- Location in the Province of Jaén Santiago-Pontones (Andalusia) Santiago-Pontones (Spain)
- Country: Spain
- Autonomous community: Andalusia
- Province: Jaén
- Municipality: Santiago-Pontones

Area
  - Total: 684 km^{2} (264 sq mi)
- Elevation: 1 m (3.3 ft)

Population (2025-01-01)
  - Total: 2,629
  - Density: 3.84/km^{2} (9.95/sq mi)
- Time zone: UTC+1 (CET)
  - Summer (DST): UTC+2 (CEST)

Santiago-Pontones is a city located in the province of Jaén, Spain. According to the 2005 census (INE), the city has a population of 4131 inhabitants.

== See also ==
- List of municipalities in Jaén
