= Bacino di San Giacomo =

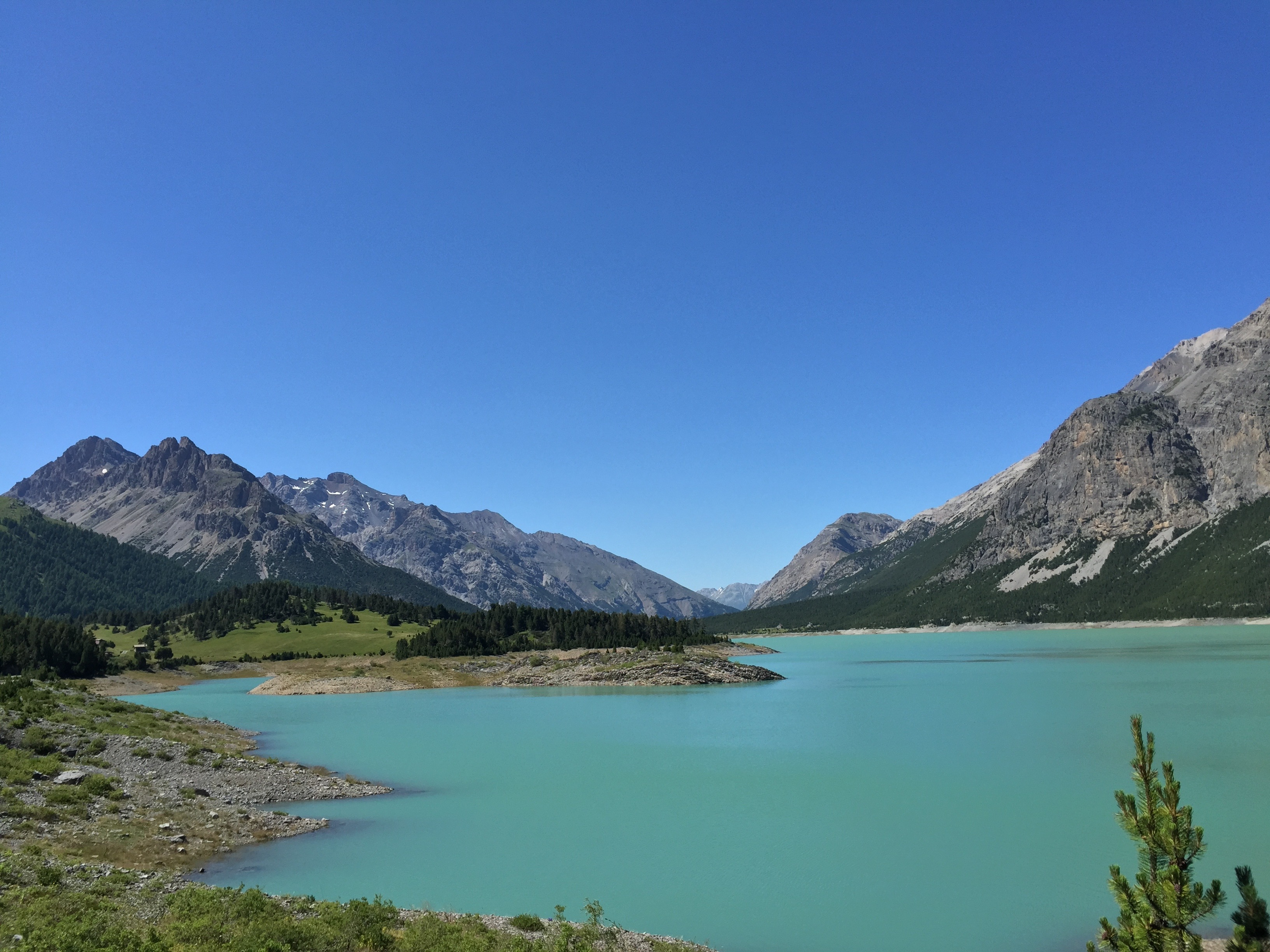
- Partial view of the Lago di San Giacomo

- Location within Lombardy
- Location: Province of Sondrio, Lombardy
- Coordinates: 46°32′35″N 10°15′58″E
- Type: reservoir
- Basin countries: Italy

Bacino di San Giacomo is a reservoir in the Province of Sondrio, Lombardy, Italy.

== Gallery ==
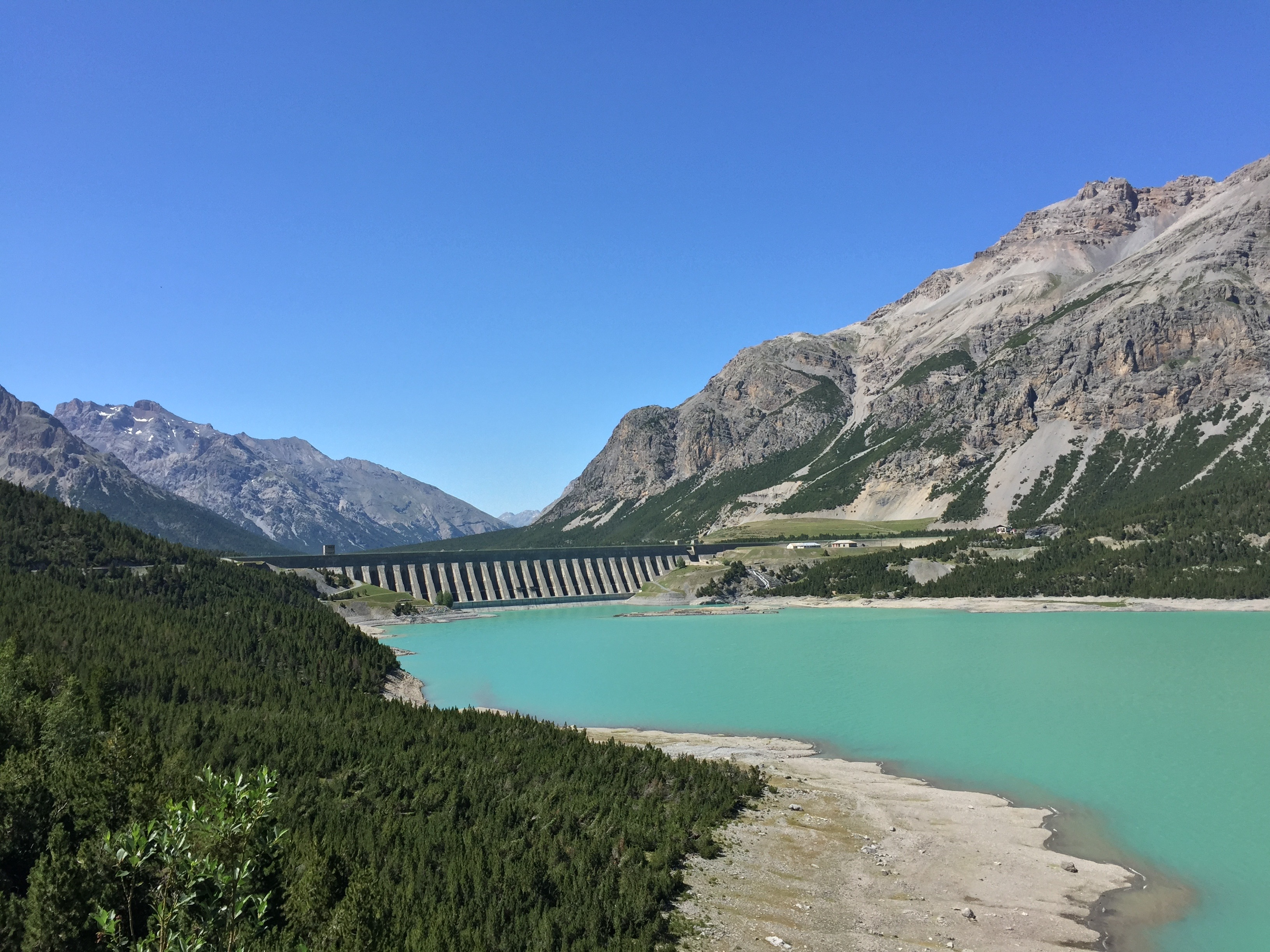
The San Giacomo Dam that separates two reservoirs (Lago di San Giacomo and Lago di Cancano)

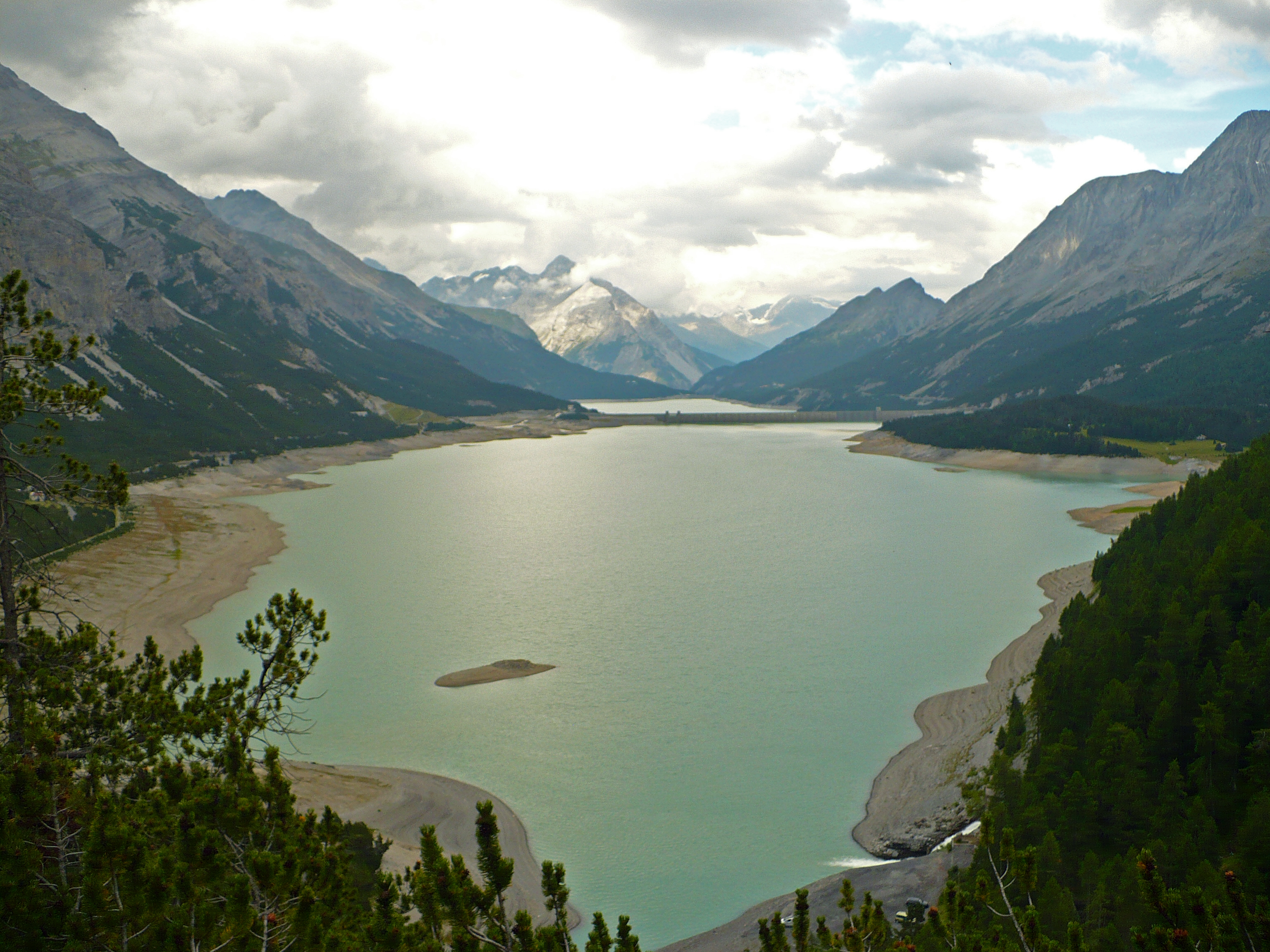
Another view of the lake

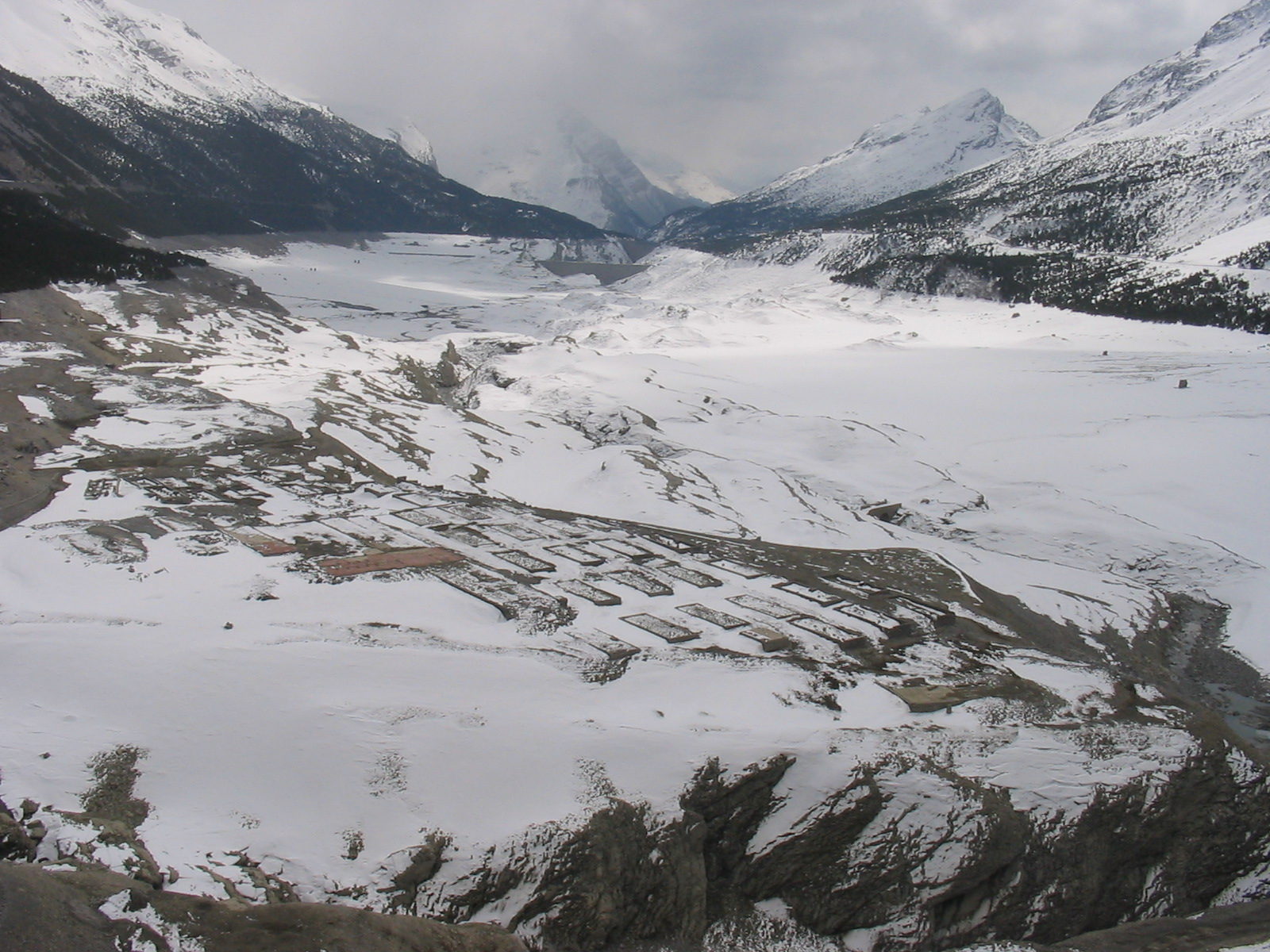
The reservoir during the winter
