= Chiclana de Segura =

- city
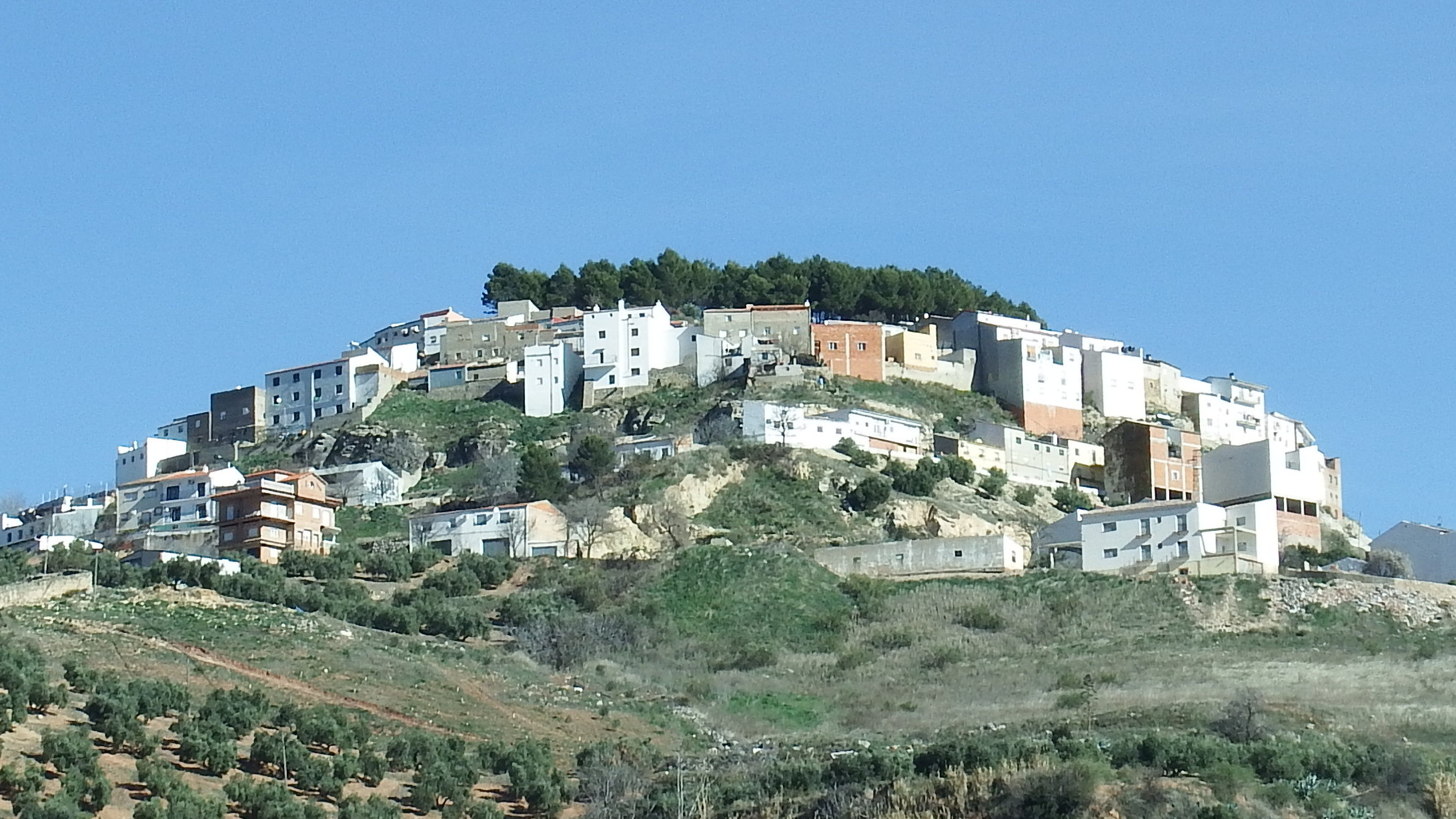

- Flag Coat of arms

- Location in the Province of Jaén Chiclana de Segura (Andalusia) Chiclana de Segura (Spain)
- Coordinates: 38°18′N 3°02′W
- Country: Spain
- Autonomous community: Andalusia
- Province: Jaén
- Comarca: El Condado

Government
  - Mayor: Santiago Rodriguez Yeste (PSOE)

Area
  - Total: 233 km^{2} (90 sq mi)
- Elevation: 872 m (2,861 ft)

Population (2025-01-01)
  - Total: 859
  - Density: 3.69/km^{2} (9.55/sq mi)
- Demonym: Chiclaneros
- Time zone: UTC+1 (CET)
  - Summer (DST): UTC+2 (CEST)

Chiclana de Segura is a city located in the province of Jaén, Spain.

== Twin towns ==
- Chiclana de la Frontera, Spain
- Chiusa Sclafani, Italy

== See also ==
- List of municipalities in Jaén
