= Villa de Otura =

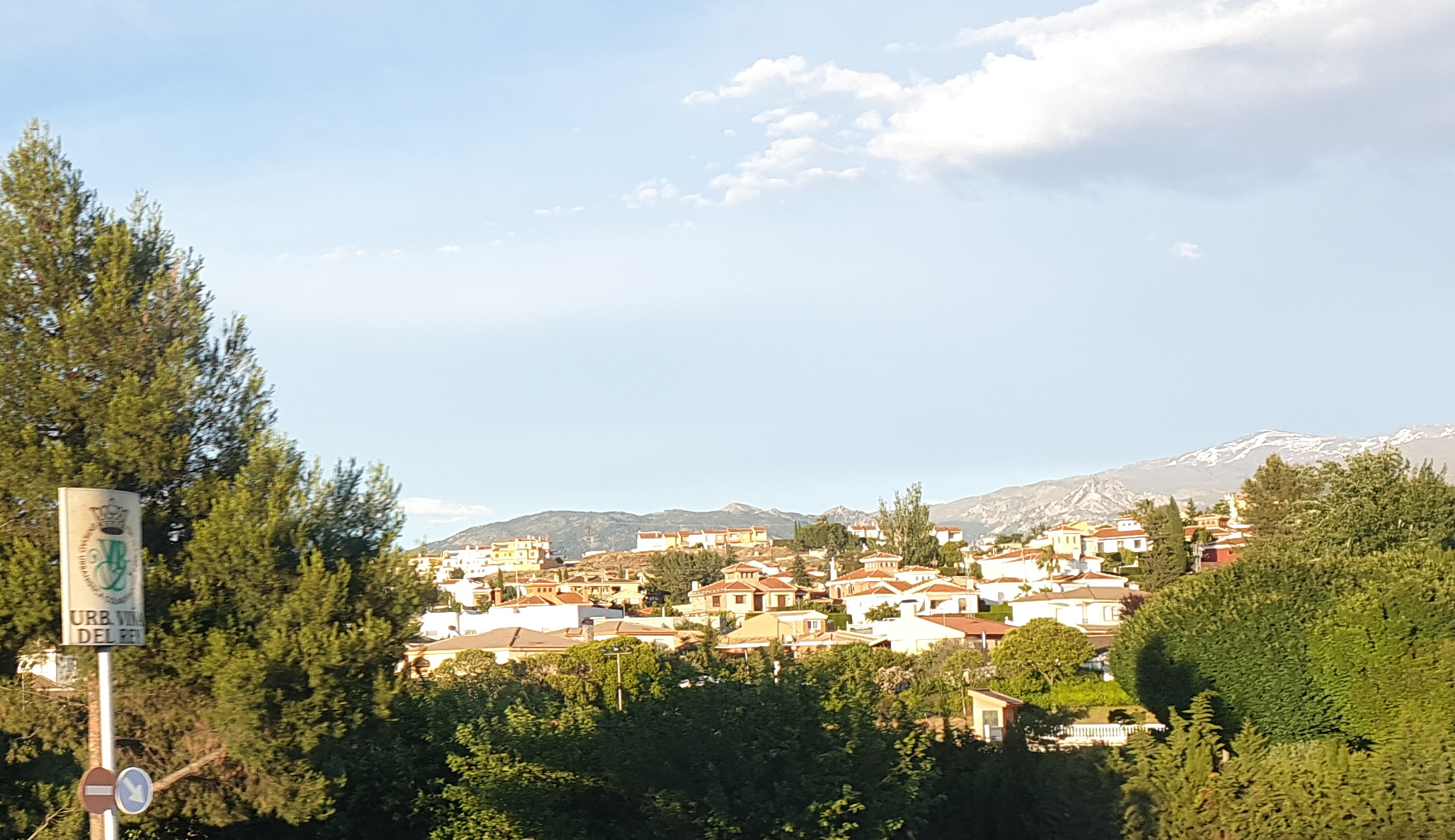
- Villa de Otura

- Flag Coat of arms

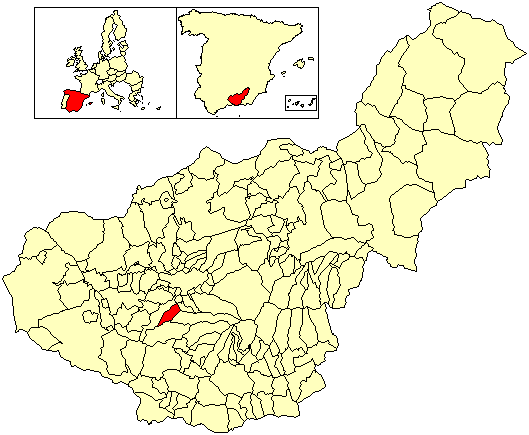

- Location in Spain
- Coordinates: 37°07′N 3°36′W
- Country: Spain
- Autonomous community: Andalusia
- Province: Granada

Area
  - Total: 24.34 km^{2} (9.40 sq mi)
- Elevation: 813 m (2,667 ft)

Population (2025-01-01)
  - Total: 7,696
  - Density: 316.2/km^{2} (818.9/sq mi)
- Time zone: UTC+1 (CET)
  - Summer (DST): UTC+2 (CEST)
- Website: www.ayuntamientodeotura.es

Villa de Otura is a municipality in the province of Granada, Spain. As of 2010, it has a population of 6,598 inhabitants.

== See also ==
- List of municipalities in Granada
