= List of teams and cyclists in the 2020 Giro d'Italia =

List of cyclists

The following is a list of teams and cyclists that will take part in the 2020 Giro d'Italia.

== Teams ==
The 19 UCI WorldTeams are automatically invited to the race. Additionally, the organisers of the Giro invited three second-tier UCI Professional Continental teams to participate in the event.

The teams participating in the race are:

UCI WorldTeams

- AG2R La Mondiale
- Astana
- Bahrain–McLaren
- Bora–Hansgrohe
- CCC Team
- Cofidis
- Deceuninck–Quick-Step
- EF Pro Cycling
- Groupama–FDJ
- Ineos Grenadiers
- Israel Start-Up Nation
- Lotto–Soudal
- Mitchelton–Scott
- Movistar Team
- NTT Pro Cycling
- Team Jumbo–Visma
- Team Sunweb
- Trek–Segafredo
- UAE Team Emirates

UCI Professional Continental teams

- Androni Giocattoli–Sidermec
- Bardiani–CSF–Faizanè
- Vini Zabù–Brado–KTM

== Cyclists ==
Legend
No.	Starting number worn by the rider during the Giro
Pos.	Position in the general classification
Time	Deficit to the winner of the general classification
†	Denotes riders born on or after 1 January 1995 eligible for the young rider classification
General classification	Denotes the winner of the general classification
Points classification	Denotes the winner of the points classification
Mountains classification	Denotes the winner of the mountains classification
Young rider classification	Denotes the winner of the young rider classification (eligibility indicated by †)
DNS	Denotes a rider who did not start a stage, followed by the stage before which he withdrew
DNF	Denotes a rider who did not finish a stage, followed by the stage in which he withdrew
DSQ	Denotes a rider who was disqualified from the race, followed by the stage in which this occurred
HD	Denotes a rider finished outside the time limit, followed by the stage in which they did so
COV	Denotes a rider who withdrawn because of COVID 19 either because he tested positive or team members tested positive, followed by the stage before which he withdrew
Ages correct as of Saturday 3 October 2020, the date on which the Giro began

=== By starting number ===
No.	Name	Nationality	Team	Age	Pos.	Time	Ref.
1	Tony Gallopin	France	AG2R La Mondiale	32	DNS-8	–	
2	François Bidard	France	AG2R La Mondiale	28	39	+ 2h 07' 36"	
3	Geoffrey Bouchard	France	AG2R La Mondiale	28	55	+ 2h 47' 38"	
4	Ben Gastauer	Luxembourg	AG2R La Mondiale	32	DNF-8	–	
5	Jaakko Hänninen †	Finland	AG2R La Mondiale	23	73	+ 3h 35' 23"	
6	Aurélien Paret-Peintre †	France	AG2R La Mondiale	24	16	+ 45' 04"	
7	Andrea Vendrame	Italy	AG2R La Mondiale	26	50	+ 2h 39' 38"	
8	Larry Warbasse	United States	AG2R La Mondiale	30	17	+ 53' 25"	
11	Mattia Bais †	Italy	Androni Giocattoli–Sidermec	23	102	+ 4h 49' 25"	
12	Alessandro Bisolti	Italy	Androni Giocattoli–Sidermec	35	90	+ 4h 15' 50"	
13	Jefferson Cepeda †	Ecuador	Androni Giocattoli–Sidermec	22	78	+ 3h 49' 05"	
14	Luca Chirico	Italy	Androni Giocattoli–Sidermec	28	85	+ 4h 03' 58"	
15	Simon Pellaud	Switzerland	Androni Giocattoli–Sidermec	27	71	+ 3h 28' 32"	
16	Simone Ravanelli †	Italy	Androni Giocattoli–Sidermec	25	74	+ 3h 38' 15"	
17	Jhonatan Restrepo	Colombia	Androni Giocattoli–Sidermec	25	103	+ 4h 52' 03"	
18	Josip Rumac	Croatia	Androni Giocattoli–Sidermec	25	99	+ 4h 34' 38"	
21	Jakob Fuglsang	Denmark	Astana	35	6	+ 7' 02"	
22	Manuele Boaro	Italy	Astana	33	DNF-18	–	
23	Rodrigo Contreras	Colombia	Astana	26	110	+ 5h 08' 22"	
24	Fabio Felline	Italy	Astana	30	25	+ 1h 25' 14"	
25	Jonas Gregaard †	Denmark	Astana	24	53	+ 2h 44' 59"	
26	Miguel Ángel López	Colombia	Astana	26	DNF-1	–	
27	Óscar Rodríguez †	Spain	Astana	25	45	+ 2h 32' 17"	
28	Aleksandr Vlasov †	Russia	Astana	24	DNF-2	–	
31	Yukiya Arashiro	Japan	Bahrain–McLaren	36	89	+ 4h 10' 07"	
32	Enrico Battaglin	Italy	Bahrain–McLaren	30	46	+ 2h 32' 44"	
33	Pello Bilbao	Spain	Bahrain–McLaren	30	5	+ 3' 09"	
34	Eros Capecchi	Italy	Bahrain–McLaren	34	87	+ 4h 05' 17"	
35	Domen Novak †	Slovenia	Bahrain–McLaren	25	59	+ 2h 54' 22"	
36	Mark Padun †	Ukraine	Bahrain–McLaren	24	70	+ 3h 25' 54"	
37	Hermann Pernsteiner	Austria	Bahrain–McLaren	30	10	+ 11' 05"	
38	Jan Tratnik	Slovenia	Bahrain–McLaren	30	62	+ 3h 05' 27"	
41	Giovanni Carboni †	Italy	Bardiani–CSF–Faizanè	25	82	+ 4h 02' 55"	
42	Luca Covili †	Italy	Bardiani–CSF–Faizanè	23	HD-1	–	
43	Filippo Fiorelli	Italy	Bardiani–CSF–Faizanè	25	109	+ 5h 08' 17"	
44	Giovanni Lonardi †	Italy	Bardiani–CSF–Faizanè	23	125	+ 5h 41' 00"	
45	Fabio Mazzucco †	Italy	Bardiani–CSF–Faizanè	21	129	+ 5h 48' 10"	
46	Francesco Romano †	Italy	Bardiani–CSF–Faizanè	23	91	+ 4h 18' 52"	
47	Alessandro Tonelli	Italy	Bardiani–CSF–Faizanè	28	51	+ 2h 42' 25"	
48	Filippo Zana †	Italy	Bardiani–CSF–Faizanè	21	100	+ 4h 45' 29"	
51	Peter Sagan	Slovakia	Bora–Hansgrohe	30	92	+ 4h 21' 56"	
52	Cesare Benedetti	Italy	Bora–Hansgrohe	33	94	+ 4h 23' 22"	
53	Maciej Bodnar	Poland	Bora–Hansgrohe	35	107	+ 5h 04' 10"	
54	Matteo Fabbro †	Italy	Bora–Hansgrohe	25	23	+ 1h 13' 49"	
55	Patrick Gamper †	Austria	Bora–Hansgrohe	23	DNS-8	–	
56	Patrick Konrad	Austria	Bora–Hansgrohe	28	8	+ 8' 42"	
57	Rafał Majka	Poland	Bora–Hansgrohe	31	12	+ 20' 31"	
58	Paweł Poljański	Poland	Bora–Hansgrohe	30	67	+ 3h 22' 39"	
61	Ilnur Zakarin	Russia	CCC Team	31	22	+ 1h 06' 11"	
62	Josef Černý	Czechia	CCC Team	27	86	+ 4h 04' 57"	
63	Víctor de la Parte	Spain	CCC Team	34	34	+ 2h 00' 42"	
64	Kamil Gradek	Poland	CCC Team	30	104	+ 4h 56' 07"	
65	Pavel Kochetkov	Russia	CCC Team	34	DNF-9	–	
66	Kamil Małecki †	Poland	CCC Team	24	68	+ 3h 23' 03"	
67	Joey Rosskopf	United States	CCC Team	31	64	+ 3h 10' 30"	
68	Attila Valter †	Hungary	CCC Team	22	27	+ 1h 30' 13"	
71	Elia Viviani	Italy	Cofidis	31	112	+ 5h 10' 26"	
72	Simone Consonni	Italy	Cofidis	26	115	+ 5h 16' 07"	
73	Nicolas Edet	France	Cofidis	32	DNF-15	–	
74	Nathan Haas	Australia	Cofidis	31	119	+ 5h 20' 50"	
75	Jesper Hansen	Denmark	Cofidis	29	44	+ 2h 27' 05"	
76	Mathias Le Turnier †	France	Cofidis	25	80	+ 4h 00' 46"	
77	Marco Mathis	Germany	Cofidis	26	130	+ 5h 51' 35"	
78	Stéphane Rossetto	France	Cofidis	33	63	+ 3h 08' 54"	
81	João Almeida †	Portugal	Deceuninck–Quick-Step	22	4	+ 2' 57"	
82	Davide Ballerini	Italy	Deceuninck–Quick-Step	26	72	+ 3h 30' 50"	
83	Álvaro José Hodeg †	Colombia	Deceuninck–Quick-Step	24	131	+ 5h 53' 47"	
84	Mikkel Frølich Honoré †	Denmark	Deceuninck–Quick-Step	23	30	+ 1h 34' 49"	
85	Iljo Keisse	Belgium	Deceuninck–Quick-Step	37	122	+ 5h 32' 08"	
86	James Knox †	Great Britain	Deceuninck–Quick-Step	24	14	+ 37' 41"	
87	Fausto Masnada	Italy	Deceuninck–Quick-Step	26	9	+ 9' 57"	
88	Pieter Serry	Belgium	Deceuninck–Quick-Step	31	28	+ 1h 30' 54"	
91	Sean Bennett †	United States	EF Pro Cycling	24	DNS-8	–	
92	Jonathan Caicedo	Ecuador	EF Pro Cycling	27	65	+ 3h 14' 47"	
93	Simon Clarke	Australia	EF Pro Cycling	34	75	+ 3h 41' 04"	
94	Lawson Craddock	United States	EF Pro Cycling	28	DNS-10	–	
95	Ruben Guerreiro	Portugal	EF Pro Cycling	26	33	+ 1h 58' 58"	
96	Tanel Kangert	Estonia	EF Pro Cycling	33	32	+ 1h 55' 57"	
97	Lachlan Morton	Australia	EF Pro Cycling	28	111	+ 5h 09' 44"	
98	James Whelan †	Australia	EF Pro Cycling	24	105	+ 4h 57' 54"	
101	Arnaud Démare	France	Groupama–FDJ	29	121	+ 5h 26' 45"	
102	Kilian Frankiny	Switzerland	Groupama–FDJ	26	77	+ 3h 45' 21"	
103	Jacopo Guarnieri	Italy	Groupama–FDJ	33	128	+ 5h 46' 03"	
104	Simon Guglielmi †	France	Groupama–FDJ	23	116	+ 5h 16' 48"	
105	Ignatas Konovalovas	Lithuania	Groupama–FDJ	34	124	+ 5h 36' 34"	
106	Miles Scotson	Australia	Groupama–FDJ	26	113	+ 5h 13' 09"	
107	Ramon Sinkeldam	Netherlands	Groupama–FDJ	31	DNF-10	–	
109	Benjamin Thomas †	France	Groupama–FDJ	25	DNF-5	–	
111	Rudy Barbier	France	Israel Start-Up Nation	27	DNS-9	–	
112	Matthias Brändle	Austria	Israel Start-Up Nation	30	126	+ 5h 42' 40"	
113	Alexander Cataford	Canada	Israel Start-Up Nation	27	DNF-12	–	
114	Davide Cimolai	Italy	Israel Start-Up Nation	31	118	+ 5h 19' 10"	
115	Alex Dowsett	Great Britain	Israel Start-Up Nation	32	120	+ 5h 23' 04"	
116	Daniel Navarro	Spain	Israel Start-Up Nation	37	48	+ 2h 37' 43"	
117	Guy Sagiv	Israel	Israel Start-Up Nation	25	132	+ 6h 12' 07"	
118	Rick Zabel	Germany	Israel Start-Up Nation	26	123	+ 5h 32' 22"	
121	Sander Armée	Belgium	Lotto–Soudal	34	47	+ 2h 32' 48"	
122	Thomas De Gendt	Belgium	Lotto–Soudal	33	41	+ 2h 14' 51"	
123	Jonathan Dibben	Great Britain	Lotto–Soudal	26	133	+ 6h 13' 59"	
124	Carl Fredrik Hagen	Norway	Lotto–Soudal	29	42	+ 2h 20' 58"	
125	Adam Hansen	Australia	Lotto–Soudal	39	117	+ 5h 17' 02"	
126	Matthew Holmes	Great Britain	Lotto–Soudal	26	81	+ 4h 01' 45"	
127	Stefano Oldani †	Italy	Lotto–Soudal	22	98	+ 4h 33' 10"	
128	Harm Vanhoucke †	Belgium	Lotto–Soudal	23	60	+ 2h 55' 25"	
131	Simon Yates	Great Britain	Mitchelton–Scott	28	COV-8	–	
132	Edoardo Affini †	Italy	Mitchelton–Scott	24	DNS-8	–	
133	Brent Bookwalter	United States	Mitchelton–Scott	36	DNS-6	–	
134	Jack Haig	Australia	Mitchelton–Scott	27	COV-10	–	
135	Lucas Hamilton †	Australia	Mitchelton–Scott	24	COV-10	–	
136	Michael Hepburn	Australia	Mitchelton–Scott	29	COV-10	–	
137	Damien Howson	Australia	Mitchelton–Scott	28	COV-10	–	
138	Cameron Meyer	Australia	Mitchelton–Scott	32	COV-10	–	
141	Héctor Carretero †	Spain	Movistar Team	25	79	+ 3h 54' 39"	
142	Dario Cataldo	Italy	Movistar Team	35	66	+ 3h 14' 47"	
143	Antonio Pedrero	Spain	Movistar Team	28	19	+ 59' 36"	
144	Einer Rubio †	Colombia	Movistar Team	22	58	+ 2h 51' 20"	
145	Sergio Samitier †	Spain	Movistar Team	25	13	+ 35' 29"	
146	Eduardo Sepúlveda	Argentina	Movistar Team	29	57	+ 2h 50' 15"	
147	Albert Torres	Spain	Movistar Team	30	106	+ 4h 59' 30"	
148	Davide Villella	Italy	Movistar Team	29	40	+ 2h 10' 28"	
151	Louis Meintjes	South Africa	NTT Pro Cycling	28	36	+ 2h 05' 51"	
152	Victor Campenaerts	Belgium	NTT Pro Cycling	28	95	+ 4h 27' 30"	
153	Amanuel Ghebreigzabhier	Eritrea	NTT Pro Cycling	26	54	+ 2h 47' 05"	
154	Ben O'Connor †	Australia	NTT Pro Cycling	24	20	+ 1h 02' 57"	
155	Domenico Pozzovivo	Italy	NTT Pro Cycling	37	11	+ 11' 52"	
156	Matteo Sobrero †	Italy	NTT Pro Cycling	23	76	+ 3h 41' 58"	
157	Dylan Sunderland †	Australia	NTT Pro Cycling	24	114	+ 5h 13' 54"	
158	Danilo Wyss	Switzerland	NTT Pro Cycling	35	84	+ 4h 03' 24"	
161	Geraint Thomas	Great Britain	Ineos Grenadiers	34	DNS-4	–	
162	Jonathan Castroviejo	Spain	Ineos Grenadiers	33	24	+ 1h 16' 15"	
163	Rohan Dennis	Australia	Ineos Grenadiers	30	35	+ 2h 04' 26"	
164	Filippo Ganna †	Italy	Ineos Grenadiers	24	61	+ 3h 03' 16"	
165	Tao Geoghegan Hart †	Great Britain	Ineos Grenadiers	25	1	85h 40' 21"	
166	Jhonatan Narváez †	Ecuador	Ineos Grenadiers	23	DNF-15	–	
167	Salvatore Puccio	Italy	Ineos Grenadiers	31	56	+ 2h 50' 11"	
168	Ben Swift	Great Britain	Ineos Grenadiers	32	18	+ 57' 36"	
171	Steven Kruijswijk	Netherlands	Team Jumbo–Visma	33	COV-10	–	
172	Koen Bouwman	Netherlands	Team Jumbo–Visma	26	COV-10	–	
173	Tobias Foss †	Norway	Team Jumbo–Visma	23	COV-10	–	
174	Chris Harper	Australia	Team Jumbo–Visma	25	COV-10	–	
175	Tony Martin	Germany	Team Jumbo–Visma	35	COV-10	–	
176	Christoph Pfingsten	Germany	Team Jumbo–Visma	32	COV-10	–	
177	Antwan Tolhoek	Netherlands	Team Jumbo–Visma	26	COV-10	–	
178	Jos van Emden	Netherlands	Team Jumbo–Visma	35	COV-10	–	
181	Wilco Kelderman	Netherlands	Team Sunweb	29	3	+ 1' 29"	
182	Nico Denz	Germany	Team Sunweb	26	83	+ 4h 03' 03"	
183	Chad Haga	United States	Team Sunweb	32	69	+ 3h 23' 06"	
184	Chris Hamilton †	Australia	Team Sunweb	25	29	+ 1h 32' 26"	
185	Jai Hindley †	Australia	Team Sunweb	24	2	+ 39"	
186	Michael Matthews	Australia	Team Sunweb	30	COV-10	–	
187	Sam Oomen †	Netherlands	Team Sunweb	25	21	+ 1h 03' 46"	
188	Martijn Tusveld	Netherlands	Team Sunweb	27	26	+ 1h 25' 34"	
191	Vincenzo Nibali	Italy	Trek–Segafredo	35	7	+ 8' 15"	
192	Julien Bernard	France	Trek–Segafredo	28	49	+ 2h 38' 53"	
193	Gianluca Brambilla	Italy	Trek–Segafredo	33	DNF-15	–	
194	Giulio Ciccone	Italy	Trek–Segafredo	25	DNS-14	–	
195	Nicola Conci †	Italy	Trek–Segafredo	23	52	+ 2h 43' 56"	
196	Jacopo Mosca	Italy	Trek–Segafredo	27	31	+ 1h 48' 45"	
197	Antonio Nibali	Italy	Trek–Segafredo	28	37	+ 2h 05' 56"	
198	Pieter Weening	Netherlands	Trek–Segafredo	39	DNF-5	–	
201	Diego Ulissi	Italy	UAE Team Emirates	31	38	+ 2h 06' 59"	
202	Mikkel Bjerg †	Denmark	UAE Team Emirates	21	97	+ 4h 31' 02"	
203	Valerio Conti	Italy	UAE Team Emirates	27	101	+ 4h 45' 35"	
204	Joe Dombrowski	United States	UAE Team Emirates	29	43	+ 2h 23' 09"	
205	Fernando Gaviria	Colombia	UAE Team Emirates	26	COV-16	–	
206	Brandon McNulty †	United States	UAE Team Emirates	22	15	+ 38' 10"	
207	Juan Sebastián Molano	Colombia	UAE Team Emirates	25	DNS-15	–	
208	Maximiliano Richeze	Argentina	UAE Team Emirates	37	DNF-16	–	
211	Giovanni Visconti	Italy	Vini Zabù–Brado–KTM	37	DNS-18	–	
212	Simone Bevilacqua †	Italy	Vini Zabù–Brado–KTM	23	127	+ 5h 45' 25"	
213	Marco Frapporti	Italy	Vini Zabù–Brado–KTM	35	108	+ 5h 05' 15"	
214	Lorenzo Rota †	Italy	Vini Zabù–Brado–KTM	25	93	+ 4h 22' 59"	
215	Matteo Spreafico	Italy	Vini Zabù–Brado–KTM	27	DNS-19	–	
216	Etienne van Empel	Netherlands	Vini Zabù–Brado–KTM	26	88	+ 4h 07' 49"	
217	Luca Wackermann	Italy	Vini Zabù–Brado–KTM	28	DNS-5	–	
218	Edoardo Zardini	Italy	Vini Zabù–Brado–KTM	30	96	+ 4h 30' 02"	

=== By team ===
AG2R La Mondiale (ALM)
No.	Rider	Pos.
1	Tony Gallopin (FRA)	DNS-8
2	François Bidard (FRA)	39
3	Geoffrey Bouchard (FRA)	55
4	Ben Gastauer (LUX)	DNF-8
5	Jaakko Hänninen (FIN)	73
6	Aurélien Paret-Peintre (FRA)	16
7	Andrea Vendrame (ITA)	50
8	Larry Warbasse (USA)	17

Androni Giocattoli–Sidermec (ANS)
No.	Rider	Pos.
11	Mattia Bais (ITA)	102
12	Alessandro Bisolti (ITA)	90
13	Jefferson Cepeda (ECU)	78
14	Luca Chirico (ITA)	85
15	Simon Pellaud (SUI)	71
16	Simone Ravanelli (ITA)	74
17	Jhonatan Restrepo (COL)	103
18	Josip Rumac (CRO)	99

Astana (AST)
No.	Rider	Pos.
21	Jakob Fuglsang (DEN)	6
22	Manuele Boaro (ITA)	DNF-18
23	Rodrigo Contreras (COL)	110
24	Fabio Felline (ITA)	25
25	Jonas Gregaard (DEN)	53
26	Miguel Ángel López (COL)	DNF-1
27	Óscar Rodríguez (ESP)	45
28	Aleksandr Vlasov (RUS)	DNF-2

Bahrain–McLaren (TBM)
No.	Rider	Pos.
31	Yukiya Arashiro (JPN)	89
32	Enrico Battaglin (ITA)	46
33	Pello Bilbao (ESP)	5
34	Eros Capecchi (ITA)	87
35	Domen Novak (SLO)	59
36	Mark Padun (UKR)	70
37	Hermann Pernsteiner (AUT)	10
38	Jan Tratnik (SLO)	62

Bardiani–CSF–Faizanè (BRD)
No.	Rider	Pos.
41	Giovanni Carboni (ITA)	82
42	Luca Covili (ITA)	HD-1
43	Filippo Fiorelli (ITA)	109
44	Giovanni Lonardi (ITA)	125
45	Fabio Mazzucco (ITA)	129
46	Francesco Romano (ITA)	91
47	Alessandro Tonelli (ITA)	51
48	Filippo Zana (ITA)	100

Bora–Hansgrohe (BOH)
No.	Rider	Pos.
51	Peter Sagan (SVK)	92
52	Cesare Benedetti (ITA)	94
53	Maciej Bodnar (POL)	107
54	Matteo Fabbro (ITA)	23
55	Patrick Gamper (AUT)	DNS-8
56	Patrick Konrad (AUT)	8
57	Rafał Majka (POL)	12
58	Paweł Poljański (POL)	67

CCC Team (CCC)
No.	Rider	Pos.
61	Ilnur Zakarin (RUS)	22
62	Josef Černý (CZE)	86
63	Víctor de la Parte (ESP)	34
64	Kamil Gradek (POL)	104
65	Pavel Kochetkov (RUS)	DNF-9
66	Kamil Małecki (POL)	68
67	Joey Rosskopf (USA)	64
68	Attila Valter (HUN)	27

Cofidis (COF)
No.	Rider	Pos.
71	Elia Viviani (ITA)	112
72	Simone Consonni (ITA)	115
73	Nicolas Edet (FRA)	DNF-15
74	Nathan Haas (AUS)	119
75	Jesper Hansen (DEN)	44
76	Mathias Le Turnier (FRA)	80
77	Marco Mathis (GER)	130
78	Stéphane Rossetto (FRA)	63

Deceuninck–Quick-Step (DQT)
No.	Rider	Pos.
81	João Almeida (POR)	4
82	Davide Ballerini (ITA)	72
83	Álvaro José Hodeg (COL)	131
84	Mikkel Frølich Honoré (DEN)	30
85	Iljo Keisse (BEL)	122
86	James Knox (GBR)	14
87	Fausto Masnada (ITA)	9
88	Pieter Serry (BEL)	28

EF Pro Cycling (EF1)
No.	Rider	Pos.
91	Sean Bennett (USA)	DNS-8
92	Jonathan Caicedo (ECU)	65
93	Simon Clarke (AUS)	75
94	Lawson Craddock (USA)	DNS-10
95	Ruben Guerreiro (POR)	33
96	Tanel Kangert (EST)	32
97	Lachlan Morton (AUS)	111
98	James Whelan (AUS)	105

Groupama–FDJ (GFC)
No.	Rider	Pos.
101	Arnaud Démare (FRA)	121
102	Kilian Frankiny (SUI)	77
103	Jacopo Guarnieri (ITA)	128
104	Simon Guglielmi (FRA)	116
105	Ignatas Konovalovas (LTU)	124
106	Miles Scotson (AUS)	113
107	Ramon Sinkeldam (NED)	DNF-10
109	Benjamin Thomas (FRA)	DNF-5

Israel Start-Up Nation (ISN)
No.	Rider	Pos.
111	Rudy Barbier (FRA)	DNS-9
112	Matthias Brändle (AUT)	126
113	Alexander Cataford (CAN)	DNF-12
114	Davide Cimolai (ITA)	118
115	Alex Dowsett (GBR)	120
116	Daniel Navarro (ESP)	48
117	Guy Sagiv (ISR)	132
118	Rick Zabel (GER)	123

Lotto–Soudal (LTS)
No.	Rider	Pos.
121	Sander Armée (BEL)	47
122	Thomas De Gendt (BEL)	41
123	Jonathan Dibben (GBR)	133
124	Carl Fredrik Hagen (NOR)	42
125	Adam Hansen (AUS)	117
126	Matthew Holmes (GBR)	81
127	Stefano Oldani (ITA)	98
128	Harm Vanhoucke (BEL)	60

Mitchelton–Scott (MTS)
No.	Rider	Pos.
131	Simon Yates (GBR)	COV-8
132	Edoardo Affini (ITA)	DNS-8
133	Brent Bookwalter (USA)	DNS-6
134	Jack Haig (AUS)	COV-10
135	Lucas Hamilton (AUS)	COV-10
136	Michael Hepburn (AUS)	COV-10
137	Damien Howson (AUS)	COV-10
138	Cameron Meyer (AUS)	COV-10

Movistar Team (MOV)
No.	Rider	Pos.
141	Héctor Carretero (ESP)	79
142	Dario Cataldo (ITA)	66
143	Antonio Pedrero (ESP)	19
144	Einer Rubio (COL)	58
145	Sergio Samitier (ESP)	13
146	Eduardo Sepúlveda (ARG)	57
147	Albert Torres (ESP)	106
148	Davide Villella (ITA)	40

NTT Pro Cycling (NTT)
No.	Rider	Pos.
151	Louis Meintjes (RSA)	36
152	Victor Campenaerts (BEL)	95
153	Amanuel Ghebreigzabhier (ERI)	54
154	Ben O'Connor (AUS)	20
155	Domenico Pozzovivo (ITA)	11
156	Matteo Sobrero (ITA)	76
157	Dylan Sunderland (AUS)	114
158	Danilo Wyss (SUI)	84

Ineos Grenadiers (IGD)
No.	Rider	Pos.
161	Geraint Thomas (GBR)	DNS-4
162	Jonathan Castroviejo (ESP)	24
163	Rohan Dennis (AUS)	35
164	Filippo Ganna (ITA)	61
165	Tao Geoghegan Hart (GBR)	1
166	Jhonatan Narváez (ECU)	DNF-15
167	Salvatore Puccio (ITA)	56
168	Ben Swift (GBR)	18

Team Jumbo–Visma (TJV)
No.	Rider	Pos.
171	Steven Kruijswijk (NED)	COV-10
172	Koen Bouwman (NED)	COV-10
173	Tobias Foss (NOR)	COV-10
174	Chris Harper (AUS)	COV-10
175	Tony Martin (GER)	COV-10
176	Christoph Pfingsten (GER)	COV-10
177	Antwan Tolhoek (NED)	COV-10
178	Jos van Emden (NED)	COV-10

Team Sunweb (SUN)
No.	Rider	Pos.
181	Wilco Kelderman (NED)	3
182	Nico Denz (GER)	83
183	Chad Haga (USA)	69
184	Chris Hamilton (AUS)	29
185	Jai Hindley (AUS)	2
186	Michael Matthews (AUS)	COV-10
187	Sam Oomen (NED)	21
188	Martijn Tusveld (NED)	26

Trek–Segafredo (TFS)
No.	Rider	Pos.
191	Vincenzo Nibali (ITA)	7
192	Julien Bernard (FRA)	49
193	Gianluca Brambilla (ITA)	DNF-15
194	Giulio Ciccone (ITA)	DNS-14
195	Nicola Conci (ITA)	52
196	Jacopo Mosca (ITA)	31
197	Antonio Nibali (ITA)	37
198	Pieter Weening (NED)	DNF-5

UAE Team Emirates (UAD)
No.	Rider	Pos.
201	Diego Ulissi (ITA)	38
202	Mikkel Bjerg (DEN)	97
203	Valerio Conti (ITA)	101
204	Joe Dombrowski (USA)	43
205	Fernando Gaviria (COL)	COV-16
206	Brandon McNulty (USA)	15
207	Juan Sebastián Molano (COL)	DNS-15
208	Maximiliano Richeze (ARG)	DNF-16

Vini Zabù–Brado–KTM (THR)
No.	Rider	Pos.
211	Giovanni Visconti (ITA)	DNS-18
212	Simone Bevilacqua (ITA)	127
213	Marco Frapporti (ITA)	108
214	Lorenzo Rota (ITA)	93
215	Matteo Spreafico (ITA)	DNS-19
216	Etienne van Empel (NED)	88
217	Luca Wackermann (ITA)	DNS-5
218	Edoardo Zardini (ITA)	96

=== By nationality ===
Country	No. of riders	Finishers	Stage wins
Argentina	2	1	
Australia	18	11	2 (Ben O'Connor, Jai Hindley)
Austria	4	3	
Belgium	6	6	
Canada	1	0	
Colombia	7	4	
Croatia	1	1	
Czechia	1	1	1 (Josef Černý)
Denmark	5	5	
Ecuador	3	2	2 (Jonathan Caicedo, Jhonatan Narváez)
Eritrea	1	1	
Estonia	1	1	
Finland	1	1	
France	12	8	4 (Arnaud Démare x4)
Germany	5	3	
Great Britain	8	6	3 (Alex Dowsett, Tao Geoghegan Hart x2)
Hungary	1	1	
Israel	1	1	
Italy	48	40	6 (Filippo Ganna x4, Diego Ulissi x2)
Japan	1	1	
Lithuania	1	1	
Luxembourg	1	0	
Netherlands	10	4	
Norway	2	1	
Poland	5	5	
Portugal	2	2	1 (Ruben Guerreiro)
Russia	3	1	
Slovakia	1	1	1 (Peter Sagan)
Slovenia	2	2	1 (Jan Tratnik)
South Africa	1	1	
Spain	9	9	
Switzerland	3	3	
Ukraine	1	1	
United States	8	5	
Total	176	133	21
