= 2021 UAE Tour =

Cycling race

2021 UCI World Tour, race 1 of 29

Race details
- Dates: 21–27 February 2021
- Stages: 7
- Distance: 1,044 km (649 mi)
- Winning time: 24h 00' 28"

Results
Jersey awarded to the overall winner	Winner	Tadej Pogačar (SLO)	(UAE Team Emirates)
	Second	Adam Yates (GBR)	(INEOS Grenadiers)
	Third	João Almeida (POR)	(Deceuninck–Quick-Step)
Jersey awarded to the points classification winner	Points	David Dekker (NED)	(Team Jumbo–Visma)
Jersey awarded to the young rider classification winner	Young rider	Tadej Pogačar (SLO)	(UAE Team Emirates)
Jersey awarded to the sprints classification winner	Sprints	Tony Gallopin (FRA)	(AG2R Citroën Team)
	Team	UAE Team Emirates	

The 2021 UAE Tour was a road cycling stage race that took place between 21 and 27 February 2021 in the United Arab Emirates. It was the third edition of the UAE Tour and the first race of the 2021 UCI World Tour.

== Teams ==
All nineteen UCI WorldTeams were joined by one UCI ProTeam to make up the twenty teams that participated in the race. Each team entered seven riders, except for EF Education–Nippo with six, for a total of 139 riders, of which 125 finished.

UCI WorldTeams

- AG2R Citroën Team
- Astana–Premier Tech
- Bora–Hansgrohe
- Cofidis
- Deceuninck–Quick-Step
- EF Education–Nippo
- Groupama–FDJ
- INEOS Grenadiers
- Intermarché–Wanty–Gobert Matériaux
- Israel Start-Up Nation
- Lotto–Soudal
- Movistar Team
- Team Bahrain Victorious
- Team BikeExchange
- Team DSM
- Team Jumbo–Visma
- Team Qhubeka Assos
- Trek–Segafredo
- UAE Team Emirates

UCI ProTeams

- Alpecin–Fenix

== Route ==
Stage characteristics and winners
Stage	Date	Course	Distance	Type	Stage winner
1	21 February	Al Dhafra Castle to Al Mirfa	176 km (109 mi)	Flat stage	Mathieu van der Poel (NED)
2	22 February	Al Hudayriat Island	13 km (8.1 mi)	Individual time trial	Filippo Ganna (ITA)
3	23 February	Al Ain to Jebel Hafeet	166 km (103 mi)	Mountain stage	Tadej Pogačar (SLO)
4	24 February	Al Marjan Island to Al Marjan Island	204 km (127 mi)	Flat stage	Sam Bennett (IRL)
5	25 February	Fujairah City to Jebel Jais	170 km (110 mi)	Mountain stage	Jonas Vingegaard (DEN)
6	26 February	Deira Islands to Palm Jumeirah	168 km (104 mi)	Flat stage	Sam Bennett (IRL)
7	27 February	Yas Mall to Abu Dhabi	147 km (91 mi)	Flat stage	Caleb Ewan (AUS)
Total		1,044 km (649 mi)			

== Stages ==
=== Stage 1 ===
21 February 2021 — Al Dhafra Castle to Al Mirfa, 176 km (109 mi)

Stage 1 Result
Rank	Rider	Team	Time
1	Mathieu van der Poel (NED)	Alpecin–Fenix	3h 45' 47"
2	David Dekker (NED)	Team Jumbo–Visma	+ 0"
3	Emīls Liepiņš (LAT)	Trek–Segafredo	+ 0"
4	Michael Mørkøv (DEN)	Deceuninck–Quick-Step	+ 0"
5	Elia Viviani (ITA)	Cofidis	+ 0"
6	Tadej Pogačar (SLO)	UAE Team Emirates	+ 0"
7	Anthony Roux (FRA)	Groupama–FDJ	+ 0"
8	Chris Harper (AUS)	Team Jumbo–Visma	+ 3"
9	João Almeida (POR)	Deceuninck–Quick-Step	+ 3"
10	Fausto Masnada (ITA)	Deceuninck–Quick-Step	+ 3"

General classification after Stage 1
Rank	Rider	Team	Time
1	Mathieu van der Poel (NED)	Alpecin–Fenix	3h 45' 37"
2	David Dekker (NED)	Team Jumbo–Visma	+ 4"
3	Michael Mørkøv (DEN)	Deceuninck–Quick-Step	+ 6"
4	João Almeida (POR)	Deceuninck–Quick-Step	+ 7"
5	Tadej Pogačar (SLO)	UAE Team Emirates	+ 8"
6	Emīls Liepiņš (LAT)	Trek–Segafredo	+ 10"
7	Elia Viviani (ITA)	Cofidis	+ 10"
8	Anthony Roux (FRA)	Groupama–FDJ	+ 10"
9	Damiano Caruso (ITA)	Team Bahrain Victorious	+ 10"
10	Chris Harper (AUS)	Team Jumbo–Visma	+ 13"

=== Stage 2 ===
22 February 2021 – Al Hudayriat Island, 13 km (8.1 mi) (ITT)

After a round of COVID-19 testing on 21 February returned a positive result for an Alpecin–Fenix staff member, the entire team, including overnight race leader Mathieu van der Poel, withdrew from the race. Consequently, David Dekker, who was second overall, wore the red jersey of the leader of the general classification on Stage 2. He was due to wear the white jersey of the leader of the young rider classification, but that jersey was worn by Tadej Pogačar, who was third in the young rider classification, as the second-placed young rider, João Almeida, wore the green jersey of the leader of the points classification, which had also been led by van der Poel. Almeida had been leading the sprints classification, so the black jersey was worn by second-placed Mattia Cattaneo.

Stage 2 Result
Rank	Rider	Team	Time
1	Filippo Ganna (ITA)	INEOS Grenadiers	13' 56"
2	Stefan Bissegger (SUI)	EF Education–Nippo	+ 14"
3	Mikkel Bjerg (DEN)	UAE Team Emirates	+ 21"
4	Tadej Pogačar (SLO)	UAE Team Emirates	+ 24"
5	Luis León Sánchez (ESP)	Astana–Premier Tech	+ 30"
6	João Almeida (POR)	Deceuninck–Quick-Step	+ 30"
7	Max Walscheid (GER)	Team Qhubeka Assos	+ 32"
8	Stefan de Bod (RSA)	Astana–Premier Tech	+ 33"
9	Daniel Martínez (COL)	INEOS Grenadiers	+ 36"
10	Matthias Brändle (AUT)	Israel Start-Up Nation	+ 38"

General classification after Stage 2
Rank	Rider	Team	Time
1	Tadej Pogačar (SLO)	UAE Team Emirates	4h 00' 05"
2	João Almeida (POR)	Deceuninck–Quick-Step	+ 5"
3	Mattia Cattaneo (ITA)	Deceuninck–Quick-Step	+ 18"
4	Chris Harper (AUS)	Team Jumbo–Visma	+ 33"
5	Adam Yates (GBR)	INEOS Grenadiers	+ 39"
6	Neilson Powless (USA)	EF Education–Nippo	+ 41"
7	Anthony Roux (FRA)	Groupama–FDJ	+ 45"
8	David Dekker (NED)	Team Jumbo–Visma	+ 46"
9	Michael Mørkøv (DEN)	Deceuninck–Quick-Step	+ 47"
10	Mattias Skjelmose Jensen (DEN)	Trek–Segafredo	+ 48"

=== Stage 3 ===
23 February 2021 – Al Ain to Jebel Hafeet, 166 km (103 mi)

Stage 3 Result
Rank	Rider	Team	Time
1	Tadej Pogačar (SLO)	UAE Team Emirates	3h 58' 35"
2	Adam Yates (GBR)	INEOS Grenadiers	+ 0"
3	Sergio Higuita (COL)	EF Education–Nippo	+ 48"
4	Emanuel Buchmann (GER)	Bora–Hansgrohe	+ 48"
5	Harm Vanhoucke (BEL)	Lotto–Soudal	+ 48"
6	João Almeida (POR)	Deceuninck–Quick-Step	+ 48"
7	Florian Stork (GER)	Team DSM	+ 54"
8	Neilson Powless (USA)	EF Education–Nippo	+ 54"
9	Chris Harper (AUS)	Team Jumbo–Visma	+ 1' 00"
10	Geoffrey Bouchard (FRA)	AG2R Citroën Team	+ 1' 09"

General classification after Stage 3
Rank	Rider	Team	Time
1	Tadej Pogačar (SLO)	UAE Team Emirates	7h 58' 30"
2	Adam Yates (GBR)	INEOS Grenadiers	+ 43"
3	João Almeida (POR)	Deceuninck–Quick-Step	+ 1' 03"
4	Chris Harper (AUS)	Team Jumbo–Visma	+ 1' 43"
5	Neilson Powless (USA)	EF Education–Nippo	+ 1' 45"
6	Mattias Skjelmose Jensen (DEN)	Trek–Segafredo	+ 2' 36"
7	Damiano Caruso (ITA)	Team Bahrain Victorious	+ 2' 38"
8	Mattia Cattaneo (ITA)	Deceuninck–Quick-Step	+ 2' 39"
9	Rubén Fernández (ESP)	Cofidis	+ 3' 32"
10	Fausto Masnada (ITA)	Deceuninck–Quick-Step	+ 4' 47"

=== Stage 4 ===
24 February 2021 – Al Marjan Island to Al Marjan Island, 204 km (127 mi)

Stage 4 Result
Rank	Rider	Team	Time
1	Sam Bennett (IRL)	Deceuninck–Quick-Step	4h 51' 51"
2	David Dekker (NED)	Team Jumbo–Visma	+ 0"
3	Caleb Ewan (AUS)	Lotto–Soudal	+ 0"
4	Elia Viviani (ITA)	Cofidis	+ 0"
5	Matteo Moschetti (ITA)	Trek–Segafredo	+ 0"
6	Pascal Ackermann (GER)	Bora–Hansgrohe	+ 0"
7	Phil Bauhaus (GER)	Team Bahrain Victorious	+ 0"
8	Giacomo Nizzolo (ITA)	Team Qhubeka Assos	+ 0"
9	Fernando Gaviria (COL)	UAE Team Emirates	+ 0"
10	Kaden Groves (AUS)	Team BikeExchange	+ 0"

General classification after Stage 4
Rank	Rider	Team	Time
1	Tadej Pogačar (SLO)	UAE Team Emirates	12h 50' 21"
2	Adam Yates (GBR)	INEOS Grenadiers	+ 43"
3	João Almeida (POR)	Deceuninck–Quick-Step	+ 1' 03"
4	Chris Harper (AUS)	Team Jumbo–Visma	+ 1' 43"
5	Neilson Powless (USA)	EF Education–Nippo	+ 1' 45"
6	Mattias Skjelmose Jensen (DEN)	Trek–Segafredo	+ 2' 36"
7	Mattia Cattaneo (ITA)	Deceuninck–Quick-Step	+ 2' 38"
8	Damiano Caruso (ITA)	Team Bahrain Victorious	+ 2' 38"
9	Rubén Fernández (ESP)	Cofidis	+ 3' 32"
10	Fausto Masnada (ITA)	Deceuninck–Quick-Step	+ 4' 47"

=== Stage 5 ===
25 February 2021 – Fujairah City to Jebel Jais, 170 km (110 mi)

Stage 5 Result
Rank	Rider	Team	Time
1	Jonas Vingegaard (DEN)	Team Jumbo–Visma	4h 19' 08"
2	Tadej Pogačar (SLO)	UAE Team Emirates	+ 3"
3	Adam Yates (GBR)	INEOS Grenadiers	+ 3"
4	Sergio Higuita (COL)	EF Education–Nippo	+ 5"
5	João Almeida (POR)	Deceuninck–Quick-Step	+ 6"
6	Nick Schultz (AUS)	Team BikeExchange	+ 6"
7	Sepp Kuss (USA)	Team Jumbo–Visma	+ 8"
8	Wout Poels (NED)	Team Bahrain Victorious	+ 8"
9	Ben Hermans (BEL)	Israel Start-Up Nation	+ 8"
10	Geoffrey Bouchard (FRA)	AG2R Citroën Team	+ 8"

General classification after Stage 5
Rank	Rider	Team	Time
1	Tadej Pogačar (SLO)	UAE Team Emirates	17h 09' 26"
2	Adam Yates (GBR)	INEOS Grenadiers	+ 45"
3	João Almeida (POR)	Deceuninck–Quick-Step	+ 1' 12"
4	Chris Harper (AUS)	Team Jumbo–Visma	+ 1' 54"
5	Neilson Powless (USA)	EF Education–Nippo	+ 1' 56"
6	Mattias Skjelmose Jensen (DEN)	Trek–Segafredo	+ 2' 47"
7	Damiano Caruso (ITA)	Team Bahrain Victorious	+ 2' 49"
8	Mattia Cattaneo (ITA)	Deceuninck–Quick-Step	+ 4' 03"
9	Rubén Fernández (ESP)	Cofidis	+ 4' 23"
10	Fausto Masnada (ITA)	Deceuninck–Quick-Step	+ 6' 40"

=== Stage 6 ===
26 February 2021 – Deira Islands to Palm Jumeirah, 168 km (104 mi)

Stage 6 Result
Rank	Rider	Team	Time
1	Sam Bennett (IRL)	Deceuninck–Quick-Step	3h 32' 23"
2	Elia Viviani (ITA)	Cofidis	+ 0"
3	Pascal Ackermann (GER)	Bora–Hansgrohe	+ 0"
4	David Dekker (NED)	Team Jumbo–Visma	+ 0"
5	Fernando Gaviria (COL)	UAE Team Emirates	+ 0"
6	Giacomo Nizzolo (ITA)	Team Qhubeka Assos	+ 0"
7	Kaden Groves (AUS)	Team BikeExchange	+ 0"
8	André Greipel (GER)	Israel Start-Up Nation	+ 0"
9	Cees Bol (NED)	Team DSM	+ 0"
10	Michael Mørkøv (DEN)	Deceuninck–Quick-Step	+ 0"

General classification after Stage 6
Rank	Rider	Team	Time
1	Tadej Pogačar (SLO)	UAE Team Emirates	20h 41' 59"
2	Adam Yates (GBR)	INEOS Grenadiers	+ 35"
3	João Almeida (POR)	Deceuninck–Quick-Step	+ 1' 02"
4	Chris Harper (AUS)	Team Jumbo–Visma	+ 1' 44"
5	Neilson Powless (USA)	EF Education–Nippo	+ 1' 46"
6	Mattias Skjelmose Jensen (DEN)	Trek–Segafredo	+ 2' 37"
7	Damiano Caruso (ITA)	Team Bahrain Victorious	+ 2' 39"
8	Mattia Cattaneo (ITA)	Deceuninck–Quick-Step	+ 3' 53"
9	Rubén Fernández (ESP)	Cofidis	+ 4' 13"
10	Fausto Masnada (ITA)	Deceuninck–Quick-Step	+ 6' 30"

=== Stage 7 ===
27 February 2021 – Yas Mall to Abu Dhabi, 147 km (91 mi)

Stage 7 Result
Rank	Rider	Team	Time
1	Caleb Ewan (AUS)	Lotto–Soudal	3h 18' 29"
2	Sam Bennett (IRL)	Deceuninck–Quick-Step	+ 0"
3	Phil Bauhaus (GER)	Team Bahrain Victorious	+ 0"
4	Michael Mørkøv (DEN)	Deceuninck–Quick-Step	+ 0"
5	Cees Bol (NED)	Team DSM	+ 0"
6	André Greipel (GER)	Israel Start-Up Nation	+ 0"
7	Andrea Vendrame (ITA)	AG2R Citroën Team	+ 0"
8	Luka Mezgec (SLO)	Team BikeExchange	+ 0"
9	Riccardo Minali (ITA)	Intermarché–Wanty–Gobert Matériaux	+ 0"
10	Yevgeniy Gidich (KAZ)	Astana–Premier Tech	+ 0"

General classification after Stage 7
Rank	Rider	Team	Time
1	Tadej Pogačar (SLO)	UAE Team Emirates	24h 00' 28"
2	Adam Yates (GBR)	INEOS Grenadiers	+ 35"
3	João Almeida (POR)	Deceuninck–Quick-Step	+ 1' 02"
4	Chris Harper (AUS)	Team Jumbo–Visma	+ 1' 42"
5	Neilson Powless (USA)	EF Education–Nippo	+ 1' 45"
6	Mattias Skjelmose Jensen (DEN)	Trek–Segafredo	+ 2' 37"
7	Damiano Caruso (ITA)	Team Bahrain Victorious	+ 2' 39"
8	Mattia Cattaneo (ITA)	Deceuninck–Quick-Step	+ 3' 53"
9	Rubén Fernández (ESP)	Cofidis	+ 4' 13"
10	Fausto Masnada (ITA)	Deceuninck–Quick-Step	+ 6' 30"

== Classification leadership table ==
Classification leadership by stage
Stage	Winner	General classification	Points classification	Sprints classification	Youth classification	Team classification
1	Mathieu van der Poel	Mathieu van der Poel	Mathieu van der Poel	João Almeida	David Dekker	Deceuninck–Quick-Step
2	Filippo Ganna	Tadej Pogačar	João Almeida	João Almeida	Tadej Pogačar	UAE Team Emirates
3	Tadej Pogačar	Tadej Pogačar	Tadej Pogačar	João Almeida	Tadej Pogačar	UAE Team Emirates
4	Sam Bennett	Tadej Pogačar	David Dekker	Tony Gallopin	Tadej Pogačar	UAE Team Emirates
5	Jonas Vingegaard	Tadej Pogačar	Tadej Pogačar	Thomas de Gendt	Tadej Pogačar	UAE Team Emirates
6	Sam Bennett	Tadej Pogačar	David Dekker	Tony Gallopin	Tadej Pogačar	UAE Team Emirates
7	Caleb Ewan	Tadej Pogačar	David Dekker	Tony Gallopin	Tadej Pogačar	UAE Team Emirates
Final		Tadej Pogačar	David Dekker	Tony Gallopin	Tadej Pogačar	UAE Team Emirates

- On stage 2, David Dekker, who was second in the general classification, wore the red jersey, because first-placed Mathieu van der Poel had withdrawn from the race after an Alpecin–Fenix staff member tested positive for COVID-19. Dekker, who was first in the young rider classification, was originally supposed to wear the white jersey, but it was instead worn by third-placed Tadej Pogačar, as second-placed João Almeida wore the green jersey as the temporary leader of the points classification, which had also been led by van der Poel.
- On stages 2 and 3, Mattia Cattaneo, who was second in the sprints classification, wore the black jersey, because first-placed João Almeida wore the green jersey.
- On stages 3 and 4, Neilson Powless, who was third in the young rider classification, wore the white jersey, because first-placed Tadej Pogačar wore the red jersey as the leader of the general classification, while second-placed João Almeida wore the green jersey on stage 3 and the black jersey on stage 4. For the same reasons, on stage 4, Filippo Ganna, who is third in the points classification, wore the green jersey.
- On stages 5 to 7, João Almeida, who was second in the young rider classification, wore the white jersey, because first-placed Tadej Pogačar wore the red jersey as the leader of the general classification. For the same reason, on stage 6, David Dekker, who was second in the points classification, wore the green jersey.

== Final classification standings ==
Legend
Denotes the winner of the general classification	Denotes the winner of the sprints classification
Denotes the winner of the points classification	Denotes the winner of the young rider classification

=== General classification ===
Final general classification (1–10)
Rank	Rider	Team	Time
1	Tadej Pogačar (SLO)	UAE Team Emirates	24h 00' 28"
2	Adam Yates (GBR)	INEOS Grenadiers	+ 35"
3	João Almeida (POR)	Deceuninck–Quick-Step	+ 1' 02"
4	Chris Harper (AUS)	Team Jumbo–Visma	+ 1' 42"
5	Neilson Powless (USA)	EF Education–Nippo	+ 1' 45"
6	Mattias Skjelmose Jensen (DEN)	Trek–Segafredo	+ 2' 37"
7	Damiano Caruso (ITA)	Team Bahrain Victorious	+ 2' 39"
8	Mattia Cattaneo (ITA)	Deceuninck–Quick-Step	+ 3' 53"
9	Rubén Fernández (ESP)	Cofidis	+ 4' 13"
10	Fausto Masnada (ITA)	Deceuninck–Quick-Step	+ 6' 30"

=== Points classification ===
Final points classification (1–10)
Rank	Rider	Team	Points
1	David Dekker (NED)	Team Jumbo–Visma	66
2	Sam Bennett (IRL)	Deceuninck–Quick-Step	56
3	Tadej Pogačar (SLO)	UAE Team Emirates	51
4	João Almeida (POR)	Deceuninck–Quick-Step	35
5	Tony Gallopin (FRA)	AG2R Citroën Team	33
6	Elia Viviani (ITA)	Cofidis	33
7	Caleb Ewan (AUS)	Lotto–Soudal	32
8	Adam Yates (GBR)	INEOS Grenadiers	28
9	Michael Mørkøv (DEN)	Deceuninck–Quick-Step	28
10	Filippo Ganna (ITA)	INEOS Grenadiers	21

=== Sprints classification ===
Final sprints classification (1–10)
Rank	Rider	Team	Points
1	Tony Gallopin (FRA)	AG2R Citroën Team	33
2	David Dekker (NED)	Team Jumbo–Visma	25
3	Thomas De Gendt (BEL)	Lotto–Soudal	18
4	João Almeida (POR)	Deceuninck–Quick-Step	16
5	Omer Goldstein (ISR)	Israel Start-Up Nation	10
6	Mattia Cattaneo (ITA)	Deceuninck–Quick-Step	9
7	Matteo Sobrero (ITA)	Astana–Premier Tech	8
8	Mathias Frank (SUI)	AG2R Citroën Team	8
9	Olivier Le Gac (FRA)	Groupama–FDJ	8
10	Luis León Sánchez (ESP)	Astana–Premier Tech	6

=== Young rider classification ===
Final young rider classification (1–10)
Rank	Rider	Team	Time
1	Tadej Pogačar (SLO)	UAE Team Emirates	24h 00' 28"
2	João Almeida (POR)	Deceuninck–Quick-Step	+ 1' 02"
3	Neilson Powless (USA)	EF Education–Nippo	+ 1' 45"
4	Mattias Skjelmose Jensen (DEN)	Trek–Segafredo	+ 2' 37"
5	Sergio Higuita (COL)	EF Education–Nippo	+ 9' 47"
6	Stefan de Bod (RSA)	Astana–Premier Tech	+ 12' 34"
7	Harm Vanhoucke (BEL)	Lotto–Soudal	+ 13' 05"
8	Rémy Rochas (FRA)	Cofidis	+ 14' 06"
9	Mikkel Bjerg (DEN)	UAE Team Emirates	+ 14' 18"
10	Samuele Battistella (ITA)	Astana–Premier Tech	+ 14' 45"

=== Team classification ===
Final team classification (1–10)
Rank	Team	Time
1	UAE Team Emirates	72h 07' 44"
2	Deceuninck–Quick-Step	+ 5' 10"
3	Team Jumbo–Visma	+ 11' 01"
4	Cofidis	+ 16' 28"
5	EF Education–Nippo	+ 17' 25"
6	Team Bahrain Victorious	+ 18' 59"
7	Astana–Premier Tech	+ 29' 11"
8	Bora–Hansgrohe	+ 32' 12"
9	Trek–Segafredo	+ 34' 17"
10	Intermarché–Wanty–Gobert Matériaux	+ 34' 25"
