= 2018 UCI Oceania Tour =

Season of the UCI Oceania Tour

- Fourteenth edition of the UCI Oceania Tour

Details
- Dates: 17 January – 25 March 2018
- Location: Oceania
- Races: 5

The 2018 UCI Oceania Tour was the 14th season of the UCI Oceania Tour. The season began on 17 January 2018 with the New Zealand Cycle Classic and finished on 25 March 2018 with the Continental Championships.

Throughout the season, points are awarded to the top finishers of stages within stage races and the final general classification standings of each of the stages races and one-day events. The quality and complexity of a race also determines how many points are awarded to the top finishers, the higher the UCI rating of a race, the more points are awarded. The UCI ratings from highest to lowest are as follows:

- Multi-day events: 2.HC, 2.1 and 2.2
- One-day events: 1.HC, 1.1 and 1.2

== Events ==
Date	Race Name	Location	UCI Rating	Winner	Team	Ref
17–21 January	New Zealand Cycle Classic	New Zealand	2.2	Hayden McCormick (NZL)	New Zealand (national team)	
27 January	Gravel and Tar	New Zealand	1.2	Ethan Berends (AUS)	Mobius–BridgeLane	
31 January – 4 February	Herald Sun Tour	Australia	2.1	Esteban Chaves (COL)	Mitchelton–Scott	
23 March	Oceanian Cycling Championships – Time Trial	Australia	CC	Hamish Bond (NZL)	Waikato BoP	
23 March	Oceanian Cycling Championships – Time Trial U23	Australia	CC	Jake Marryatt (NZL)	Fagan Motors	
25 March	Oceanian Cycling Championships – Road Race	Australia	CC	Chris Harper (AUS)	Bennelong SwissWellness Cycling Team	
25 March	Oceanian Cycling Championships – Road Race U23	Australia	CC	James Whelan (AUS)	Drapac–EF p/b Cannondale Holistic Development Team	
