= 2020 Giro d'Italia, Stage 1 to Stage 11 =

The 2020 Giro d'Italia was the 103rd edition of the Giro d'Italia, one of cycling's Grand Tours. The Giro began in Monreale with an individual time trial on 3 October, and Stage 11 occurred on 14 October with a stage to Rimini. The race finished in Milan on 25 October.

== Classification standings ==
Legend
A pink jersey.	Denotes the leader of the general classification	A blue jersey.	Denotes the leader of the mountains classification
A violet jersey.	Denotes the leader of the points classification	A white jersey.	Denotes the leader of the young rider classification

== Stage 1 ==
3 October 2020 - Monreale to Palermo, 15 km (9.3 mi) (ITT)

Stage 1 Result
Rank	Rider	Team	Time
1	Filippo Ganna (ITA)	Ineos Grenadiers	15' 24"
2	João Almeida (POR)	Deceuninck–Quick-Step	+ 22"
3	Mikkel Bjerg (DEN)	UAE Team Emirates	+ 22"
4	Geraint Thomas (GBR)	Ineos Grenadiers	+ 23"
5	Tobias Foss (NOR)	Team Jumbo–Visma	+ 31"
6	Josef Černý (CZE)	CCC Team	+ 36"
7	Matteo Sobrero (ITA)	NTT Pro Cycling	+ 40"
8	Lawson Craddock (USA)	EF Pro Cycling	+ 41"
9	Miles Scotson (AUS)	Groupama–FDJ	+ 42"
10	Matthias Brändle (AUT)	Israel Start-Up Nation	+ 42"

General classification after Stage 1
Rank	Rider	Team	Time
1	Filippo Ganna (ITA)	Ineos Grenadiers	15' 24"
2	João Almeida (POR)	Deceuninck–Quick-Step	+ 22"
3	Mikkel Bjerg (DEN)	UAE Team Emirates	+ 22"
4	Geraint Thomas (GBR)	Ineos Grenadiers	+ 23"
5	Tobias Foss (NOR)	Team Jumbo–Visma	+ 31"
6	Josef Černý (CZE)	CCC Team	+ 36"
7	Matteo Sobrero (ITA)	NTT Pro Cycling	+ 40"
8	Lawson Craddock (USA)	EF Pro Cycling	+ 41"
9	Miles Scotson (AUS)	Groupama–FDJ	+ 42"
10	Matthias Brändle (AUT)	Israel Start-Up Nation	+ 42"

== Stage 2 ==
4 October 2020 - Alcamo to Agrigento, 149 km (93 mi)

Stage 2 Result
Rank	Rider	Team	Time
1	Diego Ulissi (ITA)	UAE Team Emirates	3h 24' 58"
2	Peter Sagan (SVK)	Bora–Hansgrohe	+ 0"
3	Mikkel Frølich Honoré (DEN)	Deceuninck–Quick-Step	+ 0"
4	Michael Matthews (AUS)	Team Sunweb	+ 5"
5	Luca Wackermann (ITA)	Vini Zabù–KTM	+ 5"
6	João Almeida (POR)	Deceuninck–Quick-Step	+ 5"
7	Gianluca Brambilla (ITA)	Trek–Segafredo	+ 5"
8	Vincenzo Nibali (ITA)	Trek–Segafredo	+ 5"
9	Pello Bilbao (ESP)	Bahrain–McLaren	+ 5"
10	Lucas Hamilton (AUS)	Mitchelton–Scott	+ 5"

General classification after Stage 2
Rank	Rider	Team	Time
1	Filippo Ganna (ITA)	Ineos Grenadiers	3h 40' 27"
2	João Almeida (POR)	Deceuninck–Quick-Step	+ 22"
3	Geraint Thomas (GBR)	Ineos Grenadiers	+ 23"
4	Tobias Foss (NOR)	Team Jumbo–Visma	+ 31"
5	Josef Černý (CZE)	CCC Team	+ 36"
6	Matteo Sobrero (ITA)	NTT Pro Cycling	+ 40"
7	Jan Tratnik (SLO)	Bahrain–McLaren	+ 42"
8	Simon Yates (GBR)	Mitchelton–Scott	+ 49"
9	Tanel Kangert (EST)	EF Pro Cycling	+ 49"
10	Diego Ulissi (ITA)	UAE Team Emirates	+ 54"

== Stage 3 ==
5 October 2020 - Enna to Etna, 150 km (93 mi)

Stage 3 Result
Rank	Rider	Team	Time
1	Jonathan Caicedo (ECU)	EF Pro Cycling	4h 02' 33"
2	Giovanni Visconti (ITA)	Vini Zabù–KTM	+ 21"
3	Harm Vanhoucke (BEL)	Lotto–Soudal	+ 30"
4	Wilco Kelderman (NED)	Team Sunweb	+ 39"
5	Jakob Fuglsang (DEN)	Astana	+ 51"
6	Rafał Majka (POL)	Bora–Hansgrohe	+ 51"
7	Vincenzo Nibali (ITA)	Trek–Segafredo	+ 51"
8	Jonathan Castroviejo (ESP)	Ineos Grenadiers	+ 51"
9	Domenico Pozzovivo (ITA)	NTT Pro Cycling	+ 51"
10	Steven Kruijswijk (NED)	Team Jumbo–Visma	+ 56"

General classification after Stage 3
Rank	Rider	Team	Time
1	João Almeida (POR)	Deceuninck–Quick-Step	7h 44' 25"
2	Jonathan Caicedo (ECU)	EF Pro Cycling	+ 0"
3	Pello Bilbao (ESP)	Bahrain–McLaren	+ 37"
4	Wilco Kelderman (NED)	Team Sunweb	+ 42"
5	Harm Vanhoucke (BEL)	Lotto–Soudal	+ 53"
6	Vincenzo Nibali (ITA)	Trek–Segafredo	+ 55"
7	Domenico Pozzovivo (ITA)	NTT Pro Cycling	+ 59"
8	Brandon McNulty (USA)	UAE Team Emirates	+ 1' 11"
9	Jakob Fuglsang (DEN)	Astana	+ 1' 13"
10	Steven Kruijswijk (NED)	Team Jumbo–Visma	+ 1' 15"

== Stage 4 ==
6 October 2020 - Catania to Villafranca Tirrena, 140 km (87 mi)

Stage 4 Result
Rank	Rider	Team	Time
1	Arnaud Démare (FRA)	Groupama–FDJ	3h 22' 13"
2	Peter Sagan (SVK)	Bora–Hansgrohe	+ 0"
3	Davide Ballerini (ITA)	Deceuninck–Quick-Step	+ 0"
4	Andrea Vendrame (ITA)	AG2R La Mondiale	+ 0"
5	Elia Viviani (ITA)	Cofidis	+ 0"
6	Stefano Oldani (ITA)	Lotto–Soudal	+ 0"
7	Davide Cimolai (ITA)	Israel Start-Up Nation	+ 0"
8	Michael Matthews (AUS)	Team Sunweb	+ 0"
9	Filippo Fiorelli (ITA)	Bardiani–CSF–Faizanè	+ 0"
10	Enrico Battaglin (ITA)	Bahrain–McLaren	+ 0"

General classification after Stage 4
Rank	Rider	Team	Time
1	João Almeida (POR)	Deceuninck–Quick-Step	11h 06' 36"
2	Jonathan Caicedo (ECU)	EF Pro Cycling	+ 2"
3	Pello Bilbao (ESP)	Bahrain–McLaren	+ 39"
4	Wilco Kelderman (NED)	Team Sunweb	+ 44"
5	Harm Vanhoucke (BEL)	Lotto–Soudal	+ 55"
6	Vincenzo Nibali (ITA)	Trek–Segafredo	+ 57"
7	Domenico Pozzovivo (ITA)	NTT Pro Cycling	+ 1' 01"
8	Brandon McNulty (USA)	UAE Team Emirates	+ 1' 13"
9	Jakob Fuglsang (DEN)	Astana	+ 1' 15"
10	Steven Kruijswijk (NED)	Team Jumbo–Visma	+ 1' 17"

== Stage 5 ==
7 October 2020 - Mileto to Camigliatello Silano, 225 km (140 mi)

Stage 5 Result
Rank	Rider	Team	Time
1	Filippo Ganna (ITA)	Ineos Grenadiers	5h 59' 17"
2	Patrick Konrad (AUT)	Bora–Hansgrohe	+ 34"
3	João Almeida (POR)	Deceuninck–Quick-Step	+ 34"
4	Wilco Kelderman (NED)	Team Sunweb	+ 34"
5	Lucas Hamilton (AUS)	Mitchelton–Scott	+ 34"
6	Jai Hindley (AUS)	Team Sunweb	+ 34"
7	Harm Vanhoucke (BEL)	Lotto–Soudal	+ 34"
8	Pello Bilbao (ESP)	Bahrain–McLaren	+ 34"
9	Jakob Fuglsang (DEN)	Astana	+ 34"
10	Fausto Masnada (ITA)	Deceuninck–Quick-Step	+ 34"

General classification after Stage 5
Rank	Rider	Team	Time
1	João Almeida (POR)	Deceuninck–Quick-Step	17h 06' 23"
2	Pello Bilbao (ESP)	Bahrain–McLaren	+ 43"
3	Wilco Kelderman (NED)	Team Sunweb	+ 48"
4	Harm Vanhoucke (BEL)	Lotto–Soudal	+ 59"
5	Vincenzo Nibali (ITA)	Trek–Segafredo	+ 1' 01"
6	Domenico Pozzovivo (ITA)	NTT Pro Cycling	+ 1' 05"
7	Jakob Fuglsang (DEN)	Astana	+ 1' 19"
8	Steven Kruijswijk (NED)	Team Jumbo–Visma	+ 1' 21"
9	Patrick Konrad (AUT)	Bora–Hansgrohe	+ 1' 26"
10	Rafał Majka (POL)	Bora–Hansgrohe	+ 1' 32"

== Stage 6 ==
8 October 2020 - Castrovillari to Matera, 188 km (117 mi)

Stage 6 Result
Rank	Rider	Team	Time
1	Arnaud Démare (FRA)	Groupama–FDJ	4h 54' 38"
2	Michael Matthews (AUS)	Team Sunweb	+ 0"
3	Fabio Felline (ITA)	Astana	+ 0"
4	Juan Sebastián Molano (COL)	UAE Team Emirates	+ 0"
5	Davide Cimolai (ITA)	Israel Start-Up Nation	+ 0"
6	Andrea Vendrame (ITA)	AG2R La Mondiale	+ 0"
7	Mikkel Frølich Honoré (DEN)	Deceuninck–Quick-Step	+ 0"
8	Peter Sagan (SVK)	Bora–Hansgrohe	+ 0"
9	Enrico Battaglin (ITA)	Bahrain–McLaren	+ 0"
10	Jhonatan Narváez (ECU)	Ineos Grenadiers	+ 0"

General classification after Stage 6
Rank	Rider	Team	Time
1	João Almeida (POR)	Deceuninck–Quick-Step	22h 01' 01"
2	Pello Bilbao (ESP)	Bahrain–McLaren	+ 43"
3	Wilco Kelderman (NED)	Team Sunweb	+ 48"
4	Harm Vanhoucke (BEL)	Lotto–Soudal	+ 59"
5	Vincenzo Nibali (ITA)	Trek–Segafredo	+ 1' 01"
6	Domenico Pozzovivo (ITA)	NTT Pro Cycling	+ 1' 05"
7	Jakob Fuglsang (DEN)	Astana	+ 1' 19"
8	Steven Kruijswijk (NED)	Team Jumbo–Visma	+ 1' 21"
9	Patrick Konrad (AUT)	Bora–Hansgrohe	+ 1' 26"
10	Rafał Majka (POL)	Bora–Hansgrohe	+ 1' 32"

== Stage 7 ==
9 October 2020 - Matera to Brindisi, 143 km (89 mi)

Stage 7 Result
Rank	Rider	Team	Time
1	Arnaud Démare (FRA)	Groupama–FDJ	2h 47' 28"
2	Peter Sagan (SVK)	Bora–Hansgrohe	+ 0"
3	Michael Matthews (AUS)	Team Sunweb	+ 0"
4	Ben Swift (GBR)	Ineos Grenadiers	+ 0"
5	Álvaro Hodeg (COL)	Deceuninck–Quick-Step	+ 0"
6	Rudy Barbier (FRA)	Israel Start-Up Nation	+ 0"
7	Davide Ballerini (ITA)	Deceuninck–Quick-Step	+ 0"
8	Enrico Battaglin (ITA)	Bahrain–McLaren	+ 0"
9	Filippo Fiorelli (ITA)	Bardiani–CSF–Faizanè	+ 0"
10	Elia Viviani (ITA)	Cofidis	+ 0"

General classification after Stage 7
Rank	Rider	Team	Time
1	João Almeida (POR)	Deceuninck–Quick-Step	24h 48' 29"
2	Pello Bilbao (ESP)	Bahrain–McLaren	+ 43"
3	Wilco Kelderman (NED)	Team Sunweb	+ 48"
4	Harm Vanhoucke (BEL)	Lotto–Soudal	+ 59"
5	Vincenzo Nibali (ITA)	Trek–Segafredo	+ 1' 01"
6	Domenico Pozzovivo (ITA)	NTT Pro Cycling	+ 1' 05"
7	Jakob Fuglsang (DEN)	Astana	+ 1' 19"
8	Steven Kruijswijk (NED)	Team Jumbo–Visma	+ 1' 21"
9	Patrick Konrad (AUT)	Bora–Hansgrohe	+ 1' 26"
10	Rafał Majka (POL)	Bora–Hansgrohe	+ 1' 32"

== Stage 8 ==
10 October 2020 - Giovinazzo to Vieste, 200 km (120 mi)

Stage 8 Result
Rank	Rider	Team	Time
1	Alex Dowsett (GBR)	Israel Start-Up Nation	4h 50' 09"
2	Salvatore Puccio (ITA)	Ineos Grenadiers	+ 1' 15"
3	Matthew Holmes (GBR)	Lotto–Soudal	+ 1' 15"
4	Joey Rosskopf (USA)	CCC Team	+ 1' 15"
5	Matthias Brändle (AUT)	Israel Start-Up Nation	+ 2' 10"
6	Simone Ravanelli (ITA)	Androni Giocattoli–Sidermec	+ 2' 13"
7	Michael Matthews (AUS)	Team Sunweb	+ 13' 56"
8	Fernando Gaviria (COL)	UAE Team Emirates	+ 13' 56"
9	Mikkel Bjerg (DEN)	UAE Team Emirates	+ 13' 56"
10	Andrea Vendrame (ITA)	AG2R La Mondiale	+ 13' 56"

General classification after Stage 8
Rank	Rider	Team	Time
1	João Almeida (POR)	Deceuninck–Quick-Step	29h 52' 34"
2	Pello Bilbao (ESP)	Bahrain–McLaren	+ 43"
3	Wilco Kelderman (NED)	Team Sunweb	+ 48"
4	Harm Vanhoucke (BEL)	Lotto–Soudal	+ 59"
5	Vincenzo Nibali (ITA)	Trek–Segafredo	+ 1' 01"
6	Domenico Pozzovivo (ITA)	NTT Pro Cycling	+ 1' 05"
7	Jakob Fuglsang (DEN)	Astana	+ 1' 19"
8	Steven Kruijswijk (NED)	Team Jumbo–Visma	+ 1' 21"
9	Patrick Konrad (AUT)	Bora–Hansgrohe	+ 1' 26"
10	Rafał Majka (POL)	Bora–Hansgrohe	+ 1' 32"

== Stage 9 ==
11 October 2020 - San Salvo to Roccaraso (Aremogna), 207 km (129 mi)

Stage 9 Result
Rank	Rider	Team	Time
1	Ruben Guerreiro (POR)	EF Pro Cycling	5h 41' 20"
2	Jonathan Castroviejo (ESP)	Ineos Grenadiers	+ 8"
3	Mikkel Bjerg (DEN)	UAE Team Emirates	+ 58"
4	Kilian Frankiny (SUI)	Groupama–FDJ	+ 1' 16"
5	Larry Warbasse (USA)	AG2R La Mondiale	+ 1' 16"
6	Tao Geoghegan Hart (GBR)	Ineos Grenadiers	+ 1' 19"
7	Lucas Hamilton (AUS)	Mitchelton–Scott	+ 1' 32"
8	Wilco Kelderman (NED)	Team Sunweb	+ 1' 38"
9	Jakob Fuglsang (DEN)	Astana	+ 1' 38"
10	Jai Hindley (AUS)	Team Sunweb	+ 1' 38"

General classification after Stage 9
Rank	Rider	Team	Time
1	João Almeida (POR)	Deceuninck–Quick-Step	35h 35' 50"
2	Wilco Kelderman (NED)	Team Sunweb	+ 30"
3	Pello Bilbao (ESP)	Bahrain–McLaren	+ 39"
4	Domenico Pozzovivo (ITA)	NTT Pro Cycling	+ 53"
5	Vincenzo Nibali (ITA)	Trek–Segafredo	+ 57"
6	Jakob Fuglsang (DEN)	Astana	+ 1' 01"
7	Harm Vanhoucke (BEL)	Lotto–Soudal	+ 1' 02"
8	Patrick Konrad (AUT)	Bora–Hansgrohe	+ 1' 11"
9	Jai Hindley (AUS)	Team Sunweb	+ 1' 15"
10	Rafał Majka (POL)	Bora–Hansgrohe	+ 1' 17"

== Rest day 1 ==
12 October 2020

== Stage 10 ==
13 October 2020 - Lanciano to Tortoreto, 177 km (110 mi)

Stage 10 Result
Rank	Rider	Team	Time
1	Peter Sagan (SVK)	Bora–Hansgrohe	4h 01' 56"
2	Brandon McNulty (USA)	UAE Team Emirates	+ 19"
3	João Almeida (POR)	Deceuninck–Quick-Step	+ 23"
4	Ben Swift (GBR)	Ineos Grenadiers	+ 23"
5	Jai Hindley (AUS)	Team Sunweb	+ 23"
6	Rafał Majka (POL)	Bora–Hansgrohe	+ 23"
7	Patrick Konrad (AUT)	Bora–Hansgrohe	+ 23"
8	Wilco Kelderman (NED)	Team Sunweb	+ 23"
9	Domenico Pozzovivo (ITA)	NTT Pro Cycling	+ 23"
10	Pello Bilbao (ESP)	Bahrain–McLaren	+ 23"

General classification after Stage 10
Rank	Rider	Team	Time
1	João Almeida (POR)	Deceuninck–Quick-Step	39h 38' 05"
2	Wilco Kelderman (NED)	Team Sunweb	+ 34"
3	Pello Bilbao (ESP)	Bahrain–McLaren	+ 43"
4	Domenico Pozzovivo (ITA)	NTT Pro Cycling	+ 57"
5	Vincenzo Nibali (ITA)	Trek–Segafredo	+ 1' 01"
6	Patrick Konrad (AUT)	Bora–Hansgrohe	+ 1' 15"
7	Jai Hindley (AUS)	Team Sunweb	+ 1' 19"
8	Rafał Majka (POL)	Bora–Hansgrohe	+ 1' 21"
9	Fausto Masnada (ITA)	Deceuninck–Quick-Step	+ 1' 36"
10	Hermann Pernsteiner (AUT)	Bahrain–McLaren	+ 1' 52"

== Stage 11 ==
14 October 2020 - Porto Sant'Elpidio to Rimini, 182 km (113 mi)

Stage 11 Result
Rank	Rider	Team	Time
1	Arnaud Démare (FRA)	Groupama–FDJ	4h 03' 52"
2	Peter Sagan (SVK)	Bora–Hansgrohe	+ 0"
3	Álvaro Hodeg (COL)	Deceuninck–Quick-Step	+ 0"
4	Simone Consonni (ITA)	Cofidis	+ 0"
5	Rick Zabel (GER)	Israel Start-Up Nation	+ 0"
6	Nico Denz (GER)	Team Sunweb	+ 0"
7	Fernando Gaviria (COL)	UAE Team Emirates	+ 0"
8	Stefano Oldani (ITA)	Lotto–Soudal	+ 0"
9	Jacopo Mosca (ITA)	Trek–Segafredo	+ 0"
10	Elia Viviani (ITA)	Cofidis	+ 0"

General classification after Stage 11
Rank	Rider	Team	Time
1	João Almeida (POR)	Deceuninck–Quick-Step	43h 41' 57"
2	Wilco Kelderman (NED)	Team Sunweb	+ 34"
3	Pello Bilbao (ESP)	Bahrain–McLaren	+ 43"
4	Domenico Pozzovivo (ITA)	NTT Pro Cycling	+ 57"
5	Vincenzo Nibali (ITA)	Trek–Segafredo	+ 1' 01"
6	Patrick Konrad (AUT)	Bora–Hansgrohe	+ 1' 15"
7	Jai Hindley (AUS)	Team Sunweb	+ 1' 19"
8	Rafał Majka (POL)	Bora–Hansgrohe	+ 1' 21"
9	Fausto Masnada (ITA)	Deceuninck–Quick-Step	+ 1' 36"
10	Hermann Pernsteiner (AUT)	Bahrain–McLaren	+ 1' 52"
