= David Dekker =

Dutch cyclist

Personal information
- Full name: David Dekker
- Nickname: Sneaker Dave
- Born: 2 February 1998 (age 28) Amersfoort, Netherlands
- Height: 1.89 m (6 ft 2 in)
- Weight: 78 kg (172 lb)

Cycling career
- Sport: Cycling
- Current team: BEAT CC p/b Saxo
- Discipline: Road
- Role: Rider
- Rider type: Sprinter

Amateur teams
- 2016: Willebrord Wil Vooruit
- 2017: LottoNL–Jumbo–De Jonge Renner

Professional teams
- 2018–2019: Metec–TKH
- 2020: SEG Racing Academy
- 2021–2022: Team Jumbo–Visma
- 2023–2024: Arkéa–Samsic
- 2025: Euskaltel–Euskadi
- 2026: BEAT CC p/b Saxo

David Dekker (born 2 February 1998) is a Dutch cyclist, who currently rides for UCI Continental team BEAT CC p/b Saxo. He is the son of former professional cyclist Erik Dekker. In May 2021, Dekker was named in the startlist for the 2021 Giro d'Italia.

== Major results ==
2016
1st Overall Tour des Portes du Pays d'Othe
3rd Road race, National Junior Road Championships
6th Menen-Kemmel-Menen
2018
1st Mountains classification, Olympia's Tour
2019
1st Road race, National Under-23 Road Championships
1st Stage 1 Carpathian Couriers Race
10th Arno Wallaard Memorial
2020
1st Ster van Zwolle
1st Dorpenomloop Rucphen
3rd Le Samyn
2021
1st Points classification, UAE Tour
2024
3rd Grote Prijs Jean-Pierre Monseré
2026
1st HLC Omloop van de Braakman
2nd Dorpenomloop Rucphen
5th Binche–Chimay–Binche
6th Circuit de Wallonie
7th Scheldeprijs

=== Grand Tour general classification results timeline ===
Grand Tour	2021	2022	2023	2024
Giro d'Italia	DNF	—	DNF	DNF
Tour de France	—	—	—	—
Vuelta a España	—	—	—	—

Legend
—	Did not compete
DNF	Did not finish
