= Chris Harper (cyclist) =

Australian cyclist (born 1994)

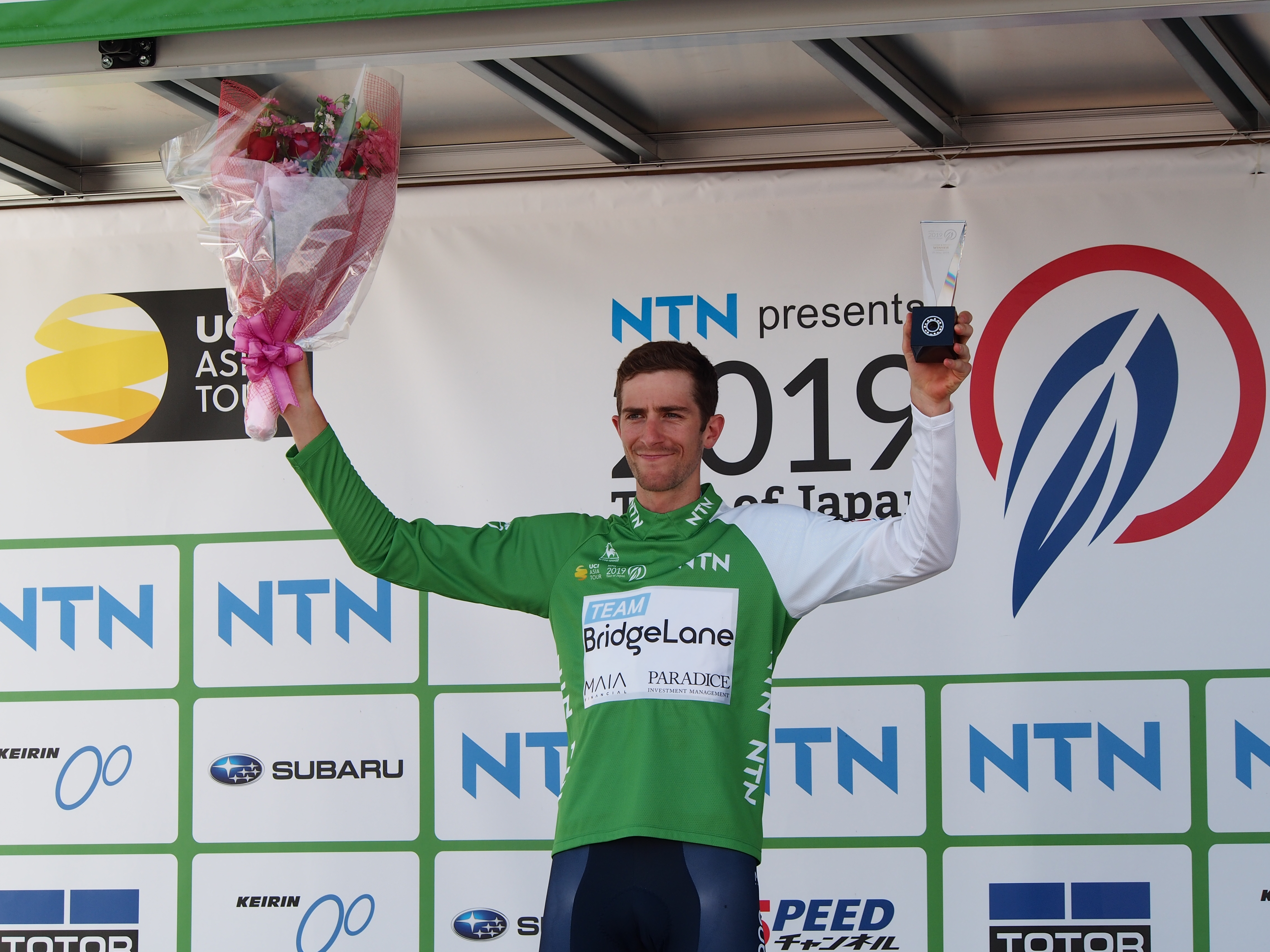
- Harper at the 2019 Tour of Japan

Personal information
- Full name: Chris Harper
- Born: 23 November 1994 (age 31) Melbourne, Victoria, Australia
- Height: 1.85 m (6 ft 1 in)
- Weight: 67 kg (148 lb)

Cycling career
- Sport: Cycling
- Current team: Pinarello–Q36.5 Pro Cycling Team
- Discipline: Road
- Role: Rider
- Rider type: Climber

Professional teams
- 2016: State of Matter MAAP Racing
- 2017–2018: IsoWhey Sports SwissWellness
- 2019: Team BridgeLane
- 2020–2022: Team Jumbo–Visma
- 2023–2024: Team Jayco–AlUla
- 2025–present: Q36.5 Pro Cycling Team

Major wins
- Grand Tours Giro d'Italia 1 individual stage (2025) Vuelta a España 1 TTT stage (2022)

Chris Harper (born 23 November 1994) is an Australian cyclist, who currently rides for UCI ProTeam Pinarello–Q36.5 Pro Cycling Team.

== Career ==
=== Early career ===
Starting his second year at Bennelong SwissWellness Cycling Team, he opened the year by finishing third at the national road race championships behind two UCI WorldTour riders. He then went on to finish in the top 10 of both the New Zealand Cycle Classic and the Herald Sun Tour. Beating James Whelan with a late attack gave Harper his first professional win, the Oceania Road Championships.

=== Team Jumbo–Visma (2020–2022) ===
Harper turned professional with UCI WorldTour Team Jumbo–Visma in 2020. In October 2020, he was named in the startlist for the 2020 Giro d'Italia, his first Grand Tour. The team pulled out ahead of stage 10 because team leader Steven Kruijswijk tested positive for COVID-19. Harper was sitting 26th overall when the team pulled out after a strong week of racing.

At the 2022 Vuelta a España Harper's Team Jumbo–Visma won the opening Team time trial. This put his teammate Robert Gesink into the red leaders jersey while Harper sat third overall.

=== Team Jayco–AlUla (2023–2024) ===
He joined Team Jayco–AlUla on a two-year contract after three years with Team Jumbo–Visma. Harper started 2024 off by placing second behind teammate Luke Plapp in both the National Road race and National Time trial championships. During stage 4 of the Tour of the Alps Harper crashed heavily head-first into a lamp pole. He abandoned the race with a concussion after spending the first two stages in the top 10 overall.

=== Q36.5 Pro Cycling Team (2025-present) ===
He joined Q36.5 Pro Cycling Team on a two-year deal to start 2025.

On stage 10 of the 2026 Tour de France, he crashed on a descent of Puy Mary. He was forced to withdraw from the race due to an injury to his hand suffered in the crash.

== Major results ==
2016
2nd Road race, Oceania Under-23 Road Championships
6th Road race, Oceania Road Championships
2017
6th Overall Tour de Langkawi
2018 (1 pro win)
1st Overall UCI Oceania Tour
1st Road race, Oceania Road Championships
3rd Road race, National Road Championships
4th Overall Tour of Japan

1st Young rider classification

6th Overall Herald Sun Tour
7th Overall New Zealand Cycle Classic
2019 (2)
1st Overall Tour de Savoie Mont Blanc

1st Points classification
1st Mountains classification
1st Stages 4 & 5

1st Overall Tour of Japan

1st Young rider classification
1st Stage 6

2nd Road race, National Road Championships
Oceanian Road Championships

3rd Road race
6th Time trial

4th Overall Herald Sun Tour
5th Overall Tour of Bihor
2020
3rd Time trial, National Road Championships
2021
4th Time trial, National Road Championships
4th Overall UAE Tour
2022
1st Stage 1 (TTT) Vuelta a España
9th Overall Sibiu Cycling Tour
2023
5th Time trial, National Road Championships
5th Coppa Agostoni
2024
National Road Championships

2nd Time trial
2nd Road race

6th Overall Volta a Catalunya
2025 (1)
1st Stage 20 Giro d'Italia
National Road Championships

4th Time trial
5th Road race

6th Overall Tour of Oman
2026
4th Andorra MoraBanc Clàssica
7th Overall Tour of the Alps

=== Grand Tour general classification results timeline ===
| Grand Tour | 2020 | 2021 | 2022 | 2023 | 2024 | 2025 |
|---|---|---|---|---|---|---|
| Giro d'Italia | DNF | — | — | — | — | 23 |
| Tour de France | — | — | — | 16 | DNF | — |
| Vuelta a España | — | — | 33 | — | DNF | — |

Legend
| — | Did not compete |
| DNF | Did not finish |
