= 2022 Vuelta a España =

77th edition of the Vuelta a España

2022 UCI World Tour, race 26 of 31
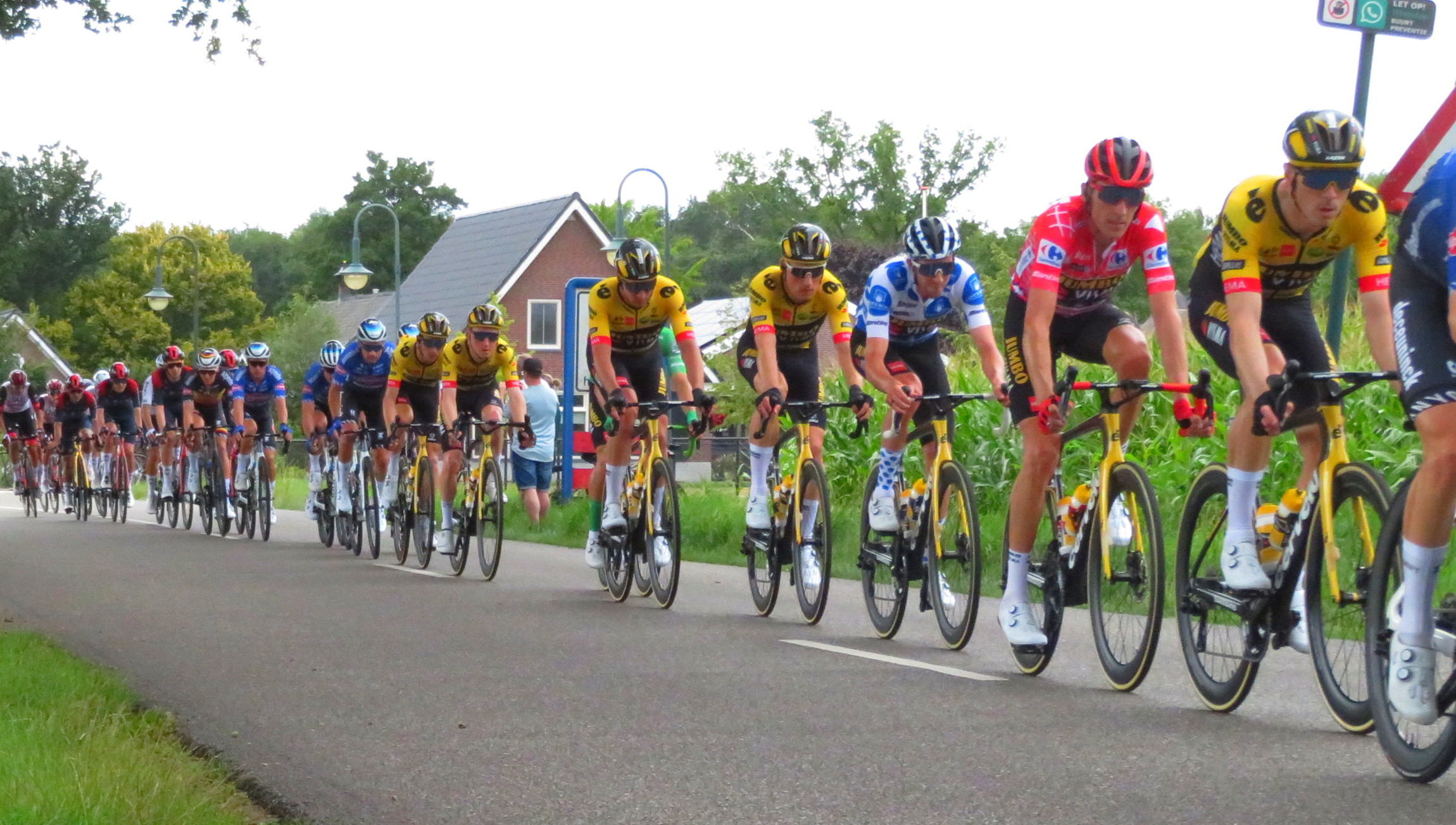
- Peloton in Stage 2, Netherlands

Race details
- Dates: 19 August – 11 September
- Stages: 21
- Distance: 3,280.5 km (2,038 mi)
- Winning time: 80h 26' 59"

Results
Jersey awarded to the overall winner	Winner	Remco Evenepoel (BEL)	(Quick-Step Alpha Vinyl Team)
	Second	Enric Mas (ESP)	(Movistar Team)
	Third	Juan Ayuso (ESP)	(UAE Team Emirates)
Jersey awarded to the points classification winner	Points	Mads Pedersen (DEN)	(Trek–Segafredo)
Jersey awarded to the mountains classification winner	Mountains	Richard Carapaz (ECU)	(Ineos Grenadiers)
Jersey awarded to the youth classification winner	Youth	Remco Evenepoel (BEL)	(Quick-Step Alpha Vinyl Team)
Jersey awarded to the combativity classification winner	Combativity	Marc Soler (ESP)	(UAE Team Emirates)
Jersey awarded to the team classification winner	Team	(United Arab Emirates) UAE Team Emirates	

The 2022 Vuelta a España was a three-week cycling race which took place in the Netherlands and Spain between 19 August and 11 September 2022. It was the 77th edition of the Vuelta a España and the third and final grand tour of the 2022 men's road cycling season. The race started in Utrecht and finished in Madrid. In the third stage, the route briefly passed through Baarle-Hertog, in Belgium.

The race was won by Belgium's Remco Evenepoel which was his first Grand Tour triumph.

== Teams ==
Twenty-three teams participated in the 2022 Vuelta a España. All eighteen UCI WorldTeams were obliged to participate. Five UCI ProTeams also participated: Alpecin–Deceuninck and Arkéa–Samsic were automatically invited as the two best-performing ProTeams in 2021.

UCI WorldTeams

- AG2R Citroën Team
- Astana Qazaqstan Team
- Bora–Hansgrohe
- Cofidis
- EF Education–EasyPost
- Groupama–FDJ
- Ineos Grenadiers
- Intermarché–Wanty–Gobert Matériaux
- Israel–Premier Tech
- Lotto–Soudal
- Movistar Team
- Quick-Step Alpha Vinyl Team
- Team Bahrain Victorious
- Team BikeExchange–Jayco
- Team DSM
- Team Jumbo–Visma
- Trek–Segafredo
- UAE Team Emirates

UCI ProTeams

- Alpecin–Deceuninck
- Arkéa–Samsic
- Burgos BH
- Equipo Kern Pharma
- Euskaltel–Euskadi

== Route and stages ==
Stage characteristics and winners
Stage	Date	Course	Distance	Type	Winner	Ref
1	19 August	Utrecht (Netherlands) to Utrecht (Netherlands)	23.2 km (14.4 mi)	Team time trial	(Netherlands) Team Jumbo–Visma	
2	20 August	's-Hertogenbosch (Netherlands) to Utrecht (Netherlands)	175.1 km (108.8 mi)	Flat stage	Sam Bennett (IRL)	
3	21 August	Breda (Netherlands) to Breda (Netherlands)	193.2 km (120.0 mi)	Flat stage	Sam Bennett (IRL)	
	22 August	Transfer				
4	23 August	Vitoria-Gasteiz to Laguardia	153.5 km (95.4 mi)	Medium-mountain stage	Primož Roglič (SLO)	
5	24 August	Irun to Bilbao	187 km (116 mi)	Medium-mountain stage	Marc Soler (ESP)	
6	25 August	Bilbao to Pico Jano (San Miguel de Aguayo)	180 km (110 mi)	Mountain stage	Jay Vine (AUS)	
7	26 August	Camargo to Cistierna	190.1 km (118.1 mi)	Medium-mountain stage	Jesús Herrada (ESP)	
8	27 August	La Pola Llaviana to Colláu Fancuaya	154.5 km (96.0 mi)	Mountain stage	Jay Vine (AUS)	
9	28 August	Villaviciosa to Les Praeres	175.5 km (109.1 mi)	Mountain stage	Louis Meintjes (RSA)	
	29 August	Elche	Rest day			
10	30 August	Elche to Alicante	31.1 km (19.3 mi)	Individual time trial	Remco Evenepoel (BEL)	
11	31 August	ElPozo Alimentación to Cabo de Gata	193 km (120 mi)	Flat stage	Kaden Groves (AUS)	
12	1 September	Salobreña to Peñas Blancas	195.5 km (121.5 mi)	Medium-mountain stage	Richard Carapaz (ECU)	
13	2 September	Ronda to Montilla	171 km (106 mi)	Flat stage	Mads Pedersen (DEN)	
14	3 September	Montoro to Sierra de La Pandera	160.3 km (99.6 mi)	Mountain stage	Richard Carapaz (ECU)	
15	4 September	Martos to Sierra Nevada	148.1 km (92.0 mi)	Mountain stage	Thymen Arensman (NED)	
	5 September	Sanlúcar de Barrameda	Rest day			
16	6 September	Sanlúcar de Barrameda to Tomares	188.9 km (117.4 mi)	Flat stage	Mads Pedersen (DEN)	
17	7 September	Aracena to Monasterio de Tentudía	160 km (99 mi)	Medium-mountain stage	Rigoberto Urán (COL)	
18	8 September	Trujillo to Alto del Piornal	191.7 km (119.1 mi)	Mountain stage	Remco Evenepoel (BEL)	
19	9 September	Talavera de la Reina to Talavera de la Reina	132.7 km (82.5 mi)	Medium-mountain stage	Mads Pedersen (DEN)	
20	10 September	Moralzarzal to Puerto de Navacerrada	175.5 km (109.1 mi)	Mountain stage	Richard Carapaz (ECU)	
21	11 September	Las Rozas to Madrid	100.5 km (62.4 mi)	Flat stage	Juan Sebastián Molano (COL)	
Total			3,280.5 km (2,038.4 mi)			

== Classification leadership ==
Classification leadership by stage
Stage	Winner	General classification	Points classification	Mountains classification	Young rider classification	Team classification	Combativity award
1	Team Jumbo–Visma	Robert Gesink	Primož Roglič (Note: Although Primož Roglič received the jersey on the podium in Utrecht, and wore it during stage 2, no points were on offer during stage 1.)	Chris Harper (Note: Although Chris Harper received the jersey on the podium in Utrecht, and wore it during stage 2, no points were on offer during stage 1.)	Ethan Hayter	Team Jumbo–Visma	not awarded
2	Sam Bennett	Mike Teunissen	Sam Bennett	Julius van den Berg	Ethan Hayter	Team Jumbo–Visma	Jetse Bol
3	Sam Bennett	Edoardo Affini	Sam Bennett	Julius van den Berg	Ethan Hayter	Team Jumbo–Visma	Pau Miquel
4	Primož Roglič	Primož Roglič	Sam Bennett	Joan Bou	Ethan Hayter	Ineos Grenadiers	Alessandro De Marchi
5	Marc Soler	Rudy Molard	Sam Bennett	Victor Langellotti	Fred Wright	Groupama–FDJ	Marc Soler
6	Jay Vine	Remco Evenepoel	Sam Bennett	Victor Langellotti	Remco Evenepoel (Note: On stages 7-8 and stages 16-19, Juan Ayuso, who was second in the young rider classification, wore the white jersey, because first placed Remco Evenepoel wore the red jersey as the leader of the general classification.) (Note: On stages 9-10, Carlos Rodríguez, who was second in the young rider classification, wore the white jersey, because first placed Remco Evenepoel wore the red jersey as the leader of the general classification.) (Note: On stages 11-15, Juan Ayuso, who was third in the young rider classification, wore the white jersey, because first placed Remco Evenepoel wore the red jersey as the leader of the general classification while second placed Carlos Rodríguez wore his Spanish national champion's jersey.)	UAE Team Emirates	Mark Padun
7	Jesús Herrada	Remco Evenepoel	Sam Bennett	Victor Langellotti	Remco Evenepoel	Team Bahrain Victorious	Jesús Herrada
8	Jay Vine	Remco Evenepoel	Mads Pedersen	Jay Vine	Remco Evenepoel	UAE Team Emirates	Mikel Landa
9	Louis Meintjes	Remco Evenepoel	Mads Pedersen	Jay Vine	Remco Evenepoel	UAE Team Emirates	José Manuel Díaz
10	Remco Evenepoel	Remco Evenepoel	Mads Pedersen	Jay Vine	Remco Evenepoel	Ineos Grenadiers	not awarded
11	Kaden Groves	Remco Evenepoel	Mads Pedersen	Jay Vine	Remco Evenepoel	Ineos Grenadiers	Jetse Bol
12	Richard Carapaz	Remco Evenepoel	Mads Pedersen	Jay Vine	Remco Evenepoel	UAE Team Emirates	Samuele Battistella
13	Mads Pedersen	Remco Evenepoel	Mads Pedersen	Jay Vine	Remco Evenepoel	UAE Team Emirates	Joan Bou
14	Richard Carapaz	Remco Evenepoel	Mads Pedersen	Jay Vine	Remco Evenepoel	UAE Team Emirates	Luis León Sánchez
15	Thymen Arensman	Remco Evenepoel	Mads Pedersen	Jay Vine	Remco Evenepoel	UAE Team Emirates	Lawson Craddock
16	Mads Pedersen	Remco Evenepoel	Mads Pedersen	Jay Vine	Remco Evenepoel	UAE Team Emirates	Luis Ángel Maté
17	Rigoberto Urán	Remco Evenepoel	Mads Pedersen	Jay Vine	Remco Evenepoel	UAE Team Emirates	Lawson Craddock
18	Remco Evenepoel	Remco Evenepoel	Mads Pedersen	Richard Carapaz	Remco Evenepoel	UAE Team Emirates	Robert Gesink
19	Mads Pedersen	Remco Evenepoel	Mads Pedersen	Richard Carapaz	Remco Evenepoel	UAE Team Emirates	Ander Okamika
20	Richard Carapaz	Remco Evenepoel	Mads Pedersen	Richard Carapaz	Remco Evenepoel	UAE Team Emirates	Alejandro Valverde
21	Juan Sebastián Molano	Remco Evenepoel	Mads Pedersen	Richard Carapaz	Remco Evenepoel	UAE Team Emirates	not awarded
Final		Remco Evenepoel	Mads Pedersen	Richard Carapaz	Remco Evenepoel	UAE Team Emirates	Marc Soler

== Classification standings ==
Legend
Denotes the leader of the general classification	Denotes the leader of the young rider classification
Denotes the leader of the points classification	Denotes the leader of the team classification
Denotes the leader of the mountains classification	Denotes the winner of the combativity award

=== General classification ===
Final general classification (1–10)
Rank	Rider	Team	Time
1	Remco Evenepoel (BEL)	Quick-Step Alpha Vinyl Team	80h 26' 59"
2	Enric Mas (ESP)	Movistar Team	+ 2' 02"
3	Juan Ayuso (ESP)	UAE Team Emirates	+ 4' 57"
4	Miguel Ángel López (COL)	Astana Qazaqstan Team	+ 5' 56"
5	João Almeida (POR)	UAE Team Emirates	+ 7' 24"
6	Thymen Arensman (NED)	Team DSM	+ 7' 45"
7	Carlos Rodríguez (ESP)	Ineos Grenadiers	+ 7' 57"
8	Ben O'Connor (AUS)	AG2R Citroën Team	+ 10' 30"
9	Rigoberto Urán (COL)	EF Education–EasyPost	+ 11' 04"
10	Jai Hindley (AUS)	Bora–Hansgrohe	+ 12' 01"

Final general classification (11–134)
Rank	Rider	Team	Time
11	Louis Meintjes (RSA)	Intermarché–Wanty–Gobert Matériaux	+ 15' 41"
12	Jan Polanc (SLO)	UAE Team Emirates	+ 21' 39"
13	Alejandro Valverde (ESP)	Movistar Team	+ 25' 39"
14	Richard Carapaz (ECU)	Ineos Grenadiers	+ 29' 19"
15	Mikel Landa (ESP)	Team Bahrain Victorious	+ 44' 13"
16	Luis León Sánchez (ESP)	Team Bahrain Victorious	+ 45' 49"
17	Thibaut Pinot (FRA)	Groupama–FDJ	+ 46' 20"
18	Wilco Kelderman (NED)	Bora–Hansgrohe	+ 48' 37"
19	Tao Geoghegan Hart (GBR)	Ineos Grenadiers	+ 49' 11"
20	Gino Mäder (SUI)	Team Bahrain Victorious	+ 52' 25"
21	David de la Cruz (ESP)	Astana Qazaqstan Team	+ 1h 00' 15"
22	Óscar Cabedo (ESP)	Burgos BH	+ 1h 00' 54"
23	Sergio Higuita (COL)	Bora–Hansgrohe	+ 1h 01' 23"
24	Sébastien Reichenbach (SUI)	Groupama–FDJ	+ 1h 01' 39"
25	Hugh Carthy (GBR)	EF Education–EasyPost	+ 1h 04' 31"
26	José Félix Parra (ESP)	Equipo Kern Pharma	+ 1h 05' 02"
27	Marc Soler (ESP)	UAE Team Emirates	+ 1h 17' 08"
28	Mikel Bizkarra (ESP)	Euskaltel–Euskadi	+ 1h 20' 34"
29	Jan Bakelants (BEL)	Intermarché–Wanty–Gobert Matériaux	+ 1h 21' 33"
30	Sam Oomen (NED)	Team Jumbo–Visma	+ 1h 22' 43"
31	Rudy Molard (FRA)	Groupama–FDJ	+ 1h 23' 20"
32	Clément Champoussin (FRA)	AG2R Citroën Team	+ 1h 24' 39"
33	Chris Harper (AUS)	Team Jumbo–Visma	+ 1h 25' 40"
34	Carl Fredrik Hagen (NOR)	Israel–Premier Tech	+ 1h 26' 35"
35	Carlos Verona (ESP)	Movistar Team	+ 1h 28' 33"
36	Edoardo Zambanini (ITA)	Team Bahrain Victorious	+ 1h 31' 40"
37	Nelson Oliveira (POR)	Movistar Team	+ 1h 31' 42"
38	Vadim Pronskiy (KAZ)	Astana Qazaqstan Team	+ 1h 35' 03"
39	Xandro Meurisse (BEL)	Alpecin–Deceuninck	+ 1h 42' 47"
40	Ilan Van Wilder (BEL)	Quick-Step Alpha Vinyl Team	+ 1h 45' 24"
41	Robert Gesink (NED)	Team Jumbo–Visma	+ 1h 47' 49"
42	Élie Gesbert (FRA)	Arkéa–Samsic	+ 1h 55' 17"
43	José Manuel Díaz (ESP)	Burgos BH	+ 1h 55' 36"
44	Daniel Navarro (ESP)	Burgos BH	+ 2h 04' 57"
45	Vincenzo Nibali (ITA)	Astana Qazaqstan Team	+ 2h 05' 45"
46	Mark Padun (UKR)	EF Education–EasyPost	+ 2h 14' 34"
47	Raúl García Pierna (ESP)	Equipo Kern Pharma	+ 2h 15' 48"
48	José Joaquín Rojas (ESP)	Movistar Team	+ 2h 17' 50"
49	Dylan van Baarle (NED)	Ineos Grenadiers	+ 2h 18' 25"
50	Gregor Mühlberger (AUT)	Movistar Team	+ 2h 25' 08"
51	Bob Jungels (LUX)	AG2R Citroën Team	+ 2h 30' 17"
52	Rohan Dennis (AUS)	Team Jumbo–Visma	+ 2h 30' 38"
53	Davide Villella (ITA)	Cofidis	+ 2h 31' 31"
54	Matteo Fabbro (ITA)	Bora–Hansgrohe	+ 2h 32' 05"
55	Lawson Craddock (USA)	Team BikeExchange–Jayco	+ 2h 32' 14"
56	Jesús Herrada (ESP)	Cofidis	+ 2h 35' 06"
57	Fausto Masnada (ITA)	Quick-Step Alpha Vinyl Team	+ 2h 38' 11"
58	Louis Vervaeke (BEL)	Quick-Step Alpha Vinyl Team	+ 2h 38' 29"
59	Rubén Fernández (ESP)	Cofidis	+ 2h 39' 15"
60	Simon Guglielmi (FRA)	Arkéa–Samsic	+ 2h 40' 00"
61	Nans Peters (FRA)	AG2R Citroën Team	+ 2h 43' 45"
62	Luis Ángel Maté (ESP)	Euskaltel–Euskadi	+ 2h 44' 52"
63	Omer Goldstein (ISR)	Israel–Premier Tech	+ 2h 51' 38"
64	Kenny Elissonde (FRA)	Trek–Segafredo	+ 3h 00' 24"
65	Harold Tejada (COL)	Astana Qazaqstan Team	+ 3h 10' 54"
66	Urko Berrade (ESP)	Equipo Kern Pharma	+ 3h 06' 38"
67	Fred Wright (GBR)	Team Bahrain Victorious	+ 3h 07' 51"
68	Jesús Ezquerra (ESP)	Burgos BH	+ 3h 09' 07"
69	Jonathan Caicedo (ECU)	EF Education–EasyPost	+ 3h 10' 33"
70	Brandon McNulty (USA)	UAE Team Emirates	+ 3h 03' 18"
71	Alexey Lutsenko (KAZ)	Astana Qazaqstan Team	+ 3h 14' 22"
72	Ben Turner (GBR)	Ineos Grenadiers	+ 3h 15' 34"
73	Nicolas Prodhomme (FRA)	AG2R Citroën Team	+ 3h 16' 03"
74	Marco Brenner (GER)	Team DSM	+ 3h 19' 54"
75	Patrick Bevin (NZL)	Israel–Premier Tech	+ 3h 20' 37"
76	Gotzon Martín (ESP)	Euskaltel–Euskadi	+ 3h 22' 03"
77	Vojtěch Řepa (CZE)	Equipo Kern Pharma	+ 3h 27' 42"
78	Lucas Hamilton (AUS)	Team BikeExchange–Jayco	+ 3h 28' 54"
79	Merhawi Kudus (ERI)	EF Education–EasyPost	+ 3h 30' 00"
80	Thomas De Gendt (BEL)	Lotto–Soudal	+ 3h 33' 27"
81	Robert Stannard (AUS)	Alpecin–Deceuninck	+ 3h 33' 44"
82	Gianni Vermeersch (BEL)	Alpecin–Deceuninck	+ 3h 42' 48"
83	Joan Bou (ESP)	Euskaltel–Euskadi	+ 3h 43' 14"
84	Carlos Canal (ESP)	Euskaltel–Euskadi	+ 3h 43' 36"
85	Jasha Sütterlin (GER)	Team Bahrain Victorious	+ 3h 44' 28"
86	Ibai Azurmendi (ESP)	Euskaltel–Euskadi	+ 3h 48' 06"
87	James Shaw (GBR)	EF Education–EasyPost	+ 3h 48' 57"
88	Julien Bernard (FRA)	Trek–Segafredo	+ 3h 51' 02"
89	Jetse Bol (NED)	Burgos BH	+ 3h 51' 27"
90	Łukasz Owsian (POL)	Arkéa–Samsic	+ 3h 51' 50"
91	Mike Teunissen (NED)	Team Jumbo–Visma	+ 3h 52' 29"
92	Antonio Tiberi (ITA)	Trek–Segafredo	+ 3h 52' 58"
93	Mikel Iturria (ESP)	Euskaltel–Euskadi	+ 3h 57' 28"
94	Xabier Azparren (ESP)	Euskaltel–Euskadi	+ 3h 59' 57"
95	Lucas Plapp (AUS)	Ineos Grenadiers	+ 4h 00' 04"
96	Ander Okamika (ESP)	Burgos BH	+ 4h 01' 39"
97	Juan Pedro López (ESP)	Trek–Segafredo	+ 4h 03' 39"
98	Thomas Champion (FRA)	Cofidis	+ 4h 07' 57"
99	Jonas Koch (GER)	Bora–Hansgrohe	+ 4h 08' 48"
100	Dries Devenyns (BEL)	Quick-Step Alpha Vinyl Team	+ 4h 09' 15"
101	Daryl Impey (RSA)	Israel–Premier Tech	+ 4h 10' 52"
102	Mads Pedersen (DEN)	Trek–Segafredo	+ 4h 14' 48"
103	Alessandro De Marchi (ITA)	Israel–Premier Tech	+ 4h 16' 06"
104	Rémi Cavagna (FRA)	Quick-Step Alpha Vinyl Team	+ 4h 16' 33"
105	Kiko Galván (ESP)	Equipo Kern Pharma	+ 4h 16' 50"
106	Joris Nieuwenhuis (NED)	Team DSM	+ 4h 19' 29"
107	Jimmy Janssens (BEL)	Alpecin–Deceuninck	+ 4h 23' 20"
108	Cedric Beullens (BEL)	Lotto–Soudal	+ 4h 25' 23"
109	Miles Scotson (AUS)	Groupama–FDJ	+ 4h 27' 35"
110	Jonas Iversby Hvideberg (NOR)	Team DSM	+ 4h 33' 12"
111	Pascal Ackermann (GER)	UAE Team Emirates	+ 4h 33' 23"
112	Luke Durbridge (AUS)	Team BikeExchange–Jayco	+ 4h 35' 38"
113	Kaden Groves (AUS)	Team BikeExchange–Jayco	+ 4h 38' 00"
114	Chris Froome (GBR)	Israel–Premier Tech	+ 4h 39' 31"
115	Antoine Raugel (FRA)	AG2R Citroën Team	+ 4h 41' 39"
116	Clément Russo (FRA)	Arkéa–Samsic	+ 4h 42' 15"
117	Dario Cataldo (ITA)	Trek–Segafredo	+ 4h 48' 07"
118	Michael Hepburn (AUS)	Team BikeExchange–Jayco	+ 4h 48' 17"
119	Alex Kirsch (LUX)	Trek–Segafredo	+ 4h 50' 17"
120	Daniel McLay (GBR)	Arkéa–Samsic	+ 4h 50' 41"
121	Danny van Poppel (NED)	Bora–Hansgrohe	+ 4h 51' 49"
122	Fabian Lienhard (SUI)	Groupama–FDJ	+ 4h 53' 56"
123	Yevgeniy Fedorov (KAZ)	Astana Qazaqstan Team	+ 4h 48' 07"
124	John Degenkolb (GER)	Team DSM	+ 4h 56' 40"
125	Kamil Malecki (POL)	Lotto–Soudal	+ 5h 00' 05"
126	Juan Sebastián Molano (COL)	UAE Team Emirates	+ 5h 09' 31"
127	Lionel Taminiaux (BEL)	Alpecin–Deceuninck	+ 5h 11' 20"
128	Ryan Mullen (IRL)	Bora–Hansgrohe	+ 5h 13' 47"
129	Julius Johansen (DEN)	Intermarché–Wanty–Gobert Matériaux	+ 5h 14' 17"
130	Julius van den Berg (NED)	EF Education–EasyPost	+ 5h 15' 43"
131	Ivo Oliveira (POR)	UAE Team Emirates	+ 5h 19' 55"
132	Tim Merlier (BEL)	Alpecin–Deceuninck	+ 5h 21' 23"
133	Lluís Mas (ESP)	Movistar Team	+ 5h 27' 42"
134	Davide Cimolai (ITA)	Cofidis	+ 5h 31' 26"

=== Points classification ===
Final points classification (1–10)
Rank	Rider	Team	Points
1	Mads Pedersen (DEN)	Trek–Segafredo	409
2	Fred Wright (GBR)	Team Bahrain Victorious	186
3	Enric Mas (ESP)	Movistar Team	138
4	Remco Evenepoel (BEL)	Quick-Step Alpha Vinyl Team	133
5	Marc Soler (ESP)	UAE Team Emirates	133
6	Danny van Poppel (NED)	Bora–Hansgrohe	108
7	Pascal Ackermann (GER)	UAE Team Emirates	106
8	Richard Carapaz (ECU)	Ineos Grenadiers	105
9	Kaden Groves (AUS)	Team BikeExchange–Jayco	74
10	Juan Sebastián Molano (COL)	UAE Team Emirates	69

=== Mountains classification ===
Final mountains classification (1–10)
Rank	Rider	Team	Points
1	Richard Carapaz (ECU)	Ineos Grenadiers	73
2	Robert Stannard (AUS)	Alpecin–Deceuninck	36
3	Enric Mas (ESP)	Movistar Team	28
4	Thymen Arensman (NED)	Team DSM	23
5	Remco Evenepoel (BEL)	Quick-Step Alpha Vinyl Team	23
6	Marc Soler (ESP)	UAE Team Emirates	23
7	Sergio Higuita (COL)	Bora–Hansgrohe	18
8	Miguel Ángel López (COL)	Astana Qazaqstan Team	17
9	Jimmy Janssens (BEL)	Alpecin–Deceuninck	17
10	Rubén Fernández (ESP)	Cofidis	15

=== Young rider classification ===
Final young rider classification (1–10)
Rank	Rider	Team	Time
1	Remco Evenepoel (BEL)	Quick-Step Alpha Vinyl Team	80h 26' 59"
2	Juan Ayuso (ESP)	UAE Team Emirates	+ 4' 57"
3	João Almeida (POR)	UAE Team Emirates	+ 7' 24"
4	Thymen Arensman (NED)	Team DSM	+ 7' 45"
5	Carlos Rodríguez (ESP)	Ineos Grenadiers	+ 7' 57"
6	Gino Mäder (SUI)	Team Bahrain Victorious	+ 52' 25"
7	Sergio Higuita (COL)	Bora–Hansgrohe	+ 1h 01' 23"
8	José Félix Parra (ESP)	Equipo Kern Pharma	+ 1h 05' 02"
9	Clément Champoussin (FRA)	AG2R Citroën Team	+ 1h 24' 39"
10	Edoardo Zambanini (ITA)	Team Bahrain Victorious	+ 1h 31' 40"

=== Team classification ===
Final team classification (1–10)
Rank	Team	Time
1	(United Arab Emirates) UAE Team Emirates	240h 36' 32"
2	(United Kingdom) Ineos Grenadiers	+ 55' 35"
3	(Spain) Movistar Team	+ 1h 16' 52"
4	Team Bahrain Victorious	+ 1h 17' 36"
5	(Kazakhstan) Astana Qazaqstan Team	+ 1h 34' 18"
6	(Germany) Bora–Hansgrohe	+ 1h 38' 20"
7	(Netherlands) Team Jumbo–Visma	+ 2h 12' 14"
8	(United States) EF Education–EasyPost	+ 2h 25' 47"
9	(France) Groupama–FDJ	+ 2h 33' 37"
10	(Belgium) Quick-Step Alpha Vinyl Team	+ 2h 47' 09"
