= João Almeida (cyclist) =

Portuguese cyclist (born 1998)

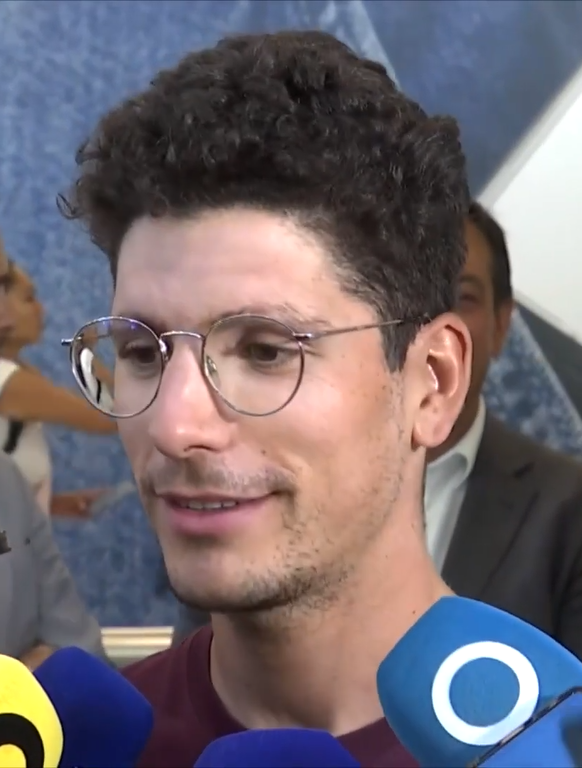
- Almeida following the 2024 Tour de France

Personal information
- Full name: João Pedro Gonçalves Almeida
- Nickname: A Pantera (The Panther)
- Born: 5 August 1998 (age 28) A dos Francos - Caldas da Rainha, Portugal
- Height: 1.78 m (5 ft 10 in)
- Weight: 63 kg (139 lb)

Cycling career
- Sport: Cycling
- Current team: UAE Team Emirates XRG
- Discipline: Road
- Role: Rider
- Rider type: Climber

Amateur teams
- 2013: Ecosprint–BTT Caldas
- 2014: CC José Maria Nicolau
- 2015: Sicasal–Liberty Seguros–Bombarralense
- 2016: CC Bairrada

Professional teams
- 2017: Unieuro Trevigiani–Hemus 1896
- 2018–2019: Hagens Berman Axeon
- 2020–2021: Deceuninck–Quick-Step
- 2022–Present: UAE Team Emirates XRG

Major wins
- Grand Tours Giro d'Italia Young rider classification (2023) 1 individual stage (2023) Vuelta a España 1 individual stage (2025) 1 TTT stage (2025) Stage races Tour de Romandie (2025) Tour de Suisse (2025) Tour of the Basque Country (2025) Tour de Pologne (2021) Tour de Luxembourg (2021) One-day races and Classics National Road Race Championships (2022) National Time Trial Championships (2021, 2023)

João Pedro Gonçalves Almeida (pronounced [ʒuˈɐ̃w alˈmɐjðɐ]; born 5 August 1998) is a Portuguese professional cyclist who currently rides for UCI WorldTeam UAE Team Emirates XRG.

Almeida rose to prominence during the 2020 Giro d'Italia, his Grand Tour debut, where he held the race leader's pink jersey for two weeks. Almeida finished the race fourth overall, the best finish at the race for a Portuguese rider. Almeida finished third at the Giro in 2023, also winning a stage and the young rider classification, and has won four UCI WorldTour stage races: the 2021 Tour de Pologne, 2025 Tour of the Basque Country, 2025 Tour de Romandie and 2025 Tour de Suisse.

== Career ==
In August 2019, Almeida, then riding for Hagens Berman Axeon, signed a 2-year contract with World Tour team Deceuninck–Quick-Step for the 2020 season.

=== Deceuninck–Quick-Step (2020–2021) ===
==== 2020 ====
After a 2nd place finish in the Giro dell'Emilia, Almeida was named in the start list for the 2020 Giro d'Italia, his first ever participation in a Grand Tour. He wore the Giro's pink leader's jersey for 15 consecutive days, from stage 4 to stage 18, the longest ever by an under-23 rider. He eventually finished 4th overall in the general classification, the highest ever placing by a Portuguese rider.

==== 2021 ====
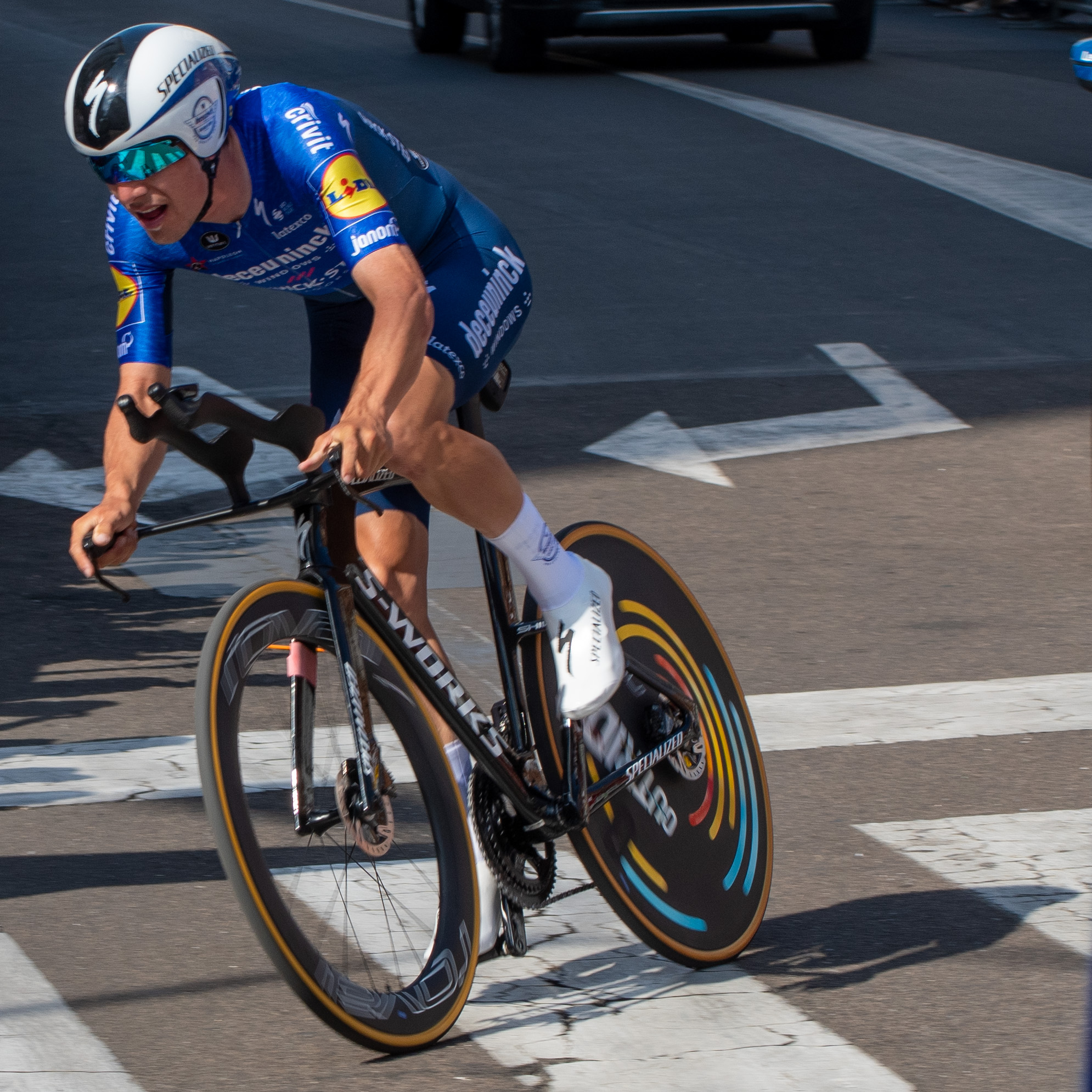
Almeida at the 2021 Giro d'Italia

After a series of top-10 finishes in winter and early-spring stage races, Almeida's contract with Deceuninck–Quick-Step was set to expire by the end of the year. Despite this, Almeida was again featured in the start list for the 2021 Giro d'Italia. After supporting Remco Evenepoel in the first 2 weeks, Almeida ended up finishing in the top-10 in the last 6 stages, placing 6th overall in the general classification.

In June, Almeida became Portuguese Time Trial Champion as an Elite rider. He later participated in the UEC European Road Championships and the Olympics.

In August, Almeida signed a 5-year contract with UAE Team Emirates to begin in 2022. Shortly after, he achieved his first stage-race general classification victories, in the Tour de Pologne and Tour de Luxembourg, also winning 3 stages and both the youth rider and points classification in the latter.

In the Autumn, Almeida finished 47th in the UCI Road World Championships Elite Road Race; 2nd in Giro dell'Emilia, losing to Primož Roglič by 3 seconds; and 3rd in Milano–Torino.

=== UAE Team Emirates (2022–) ===
==== 2022 ====
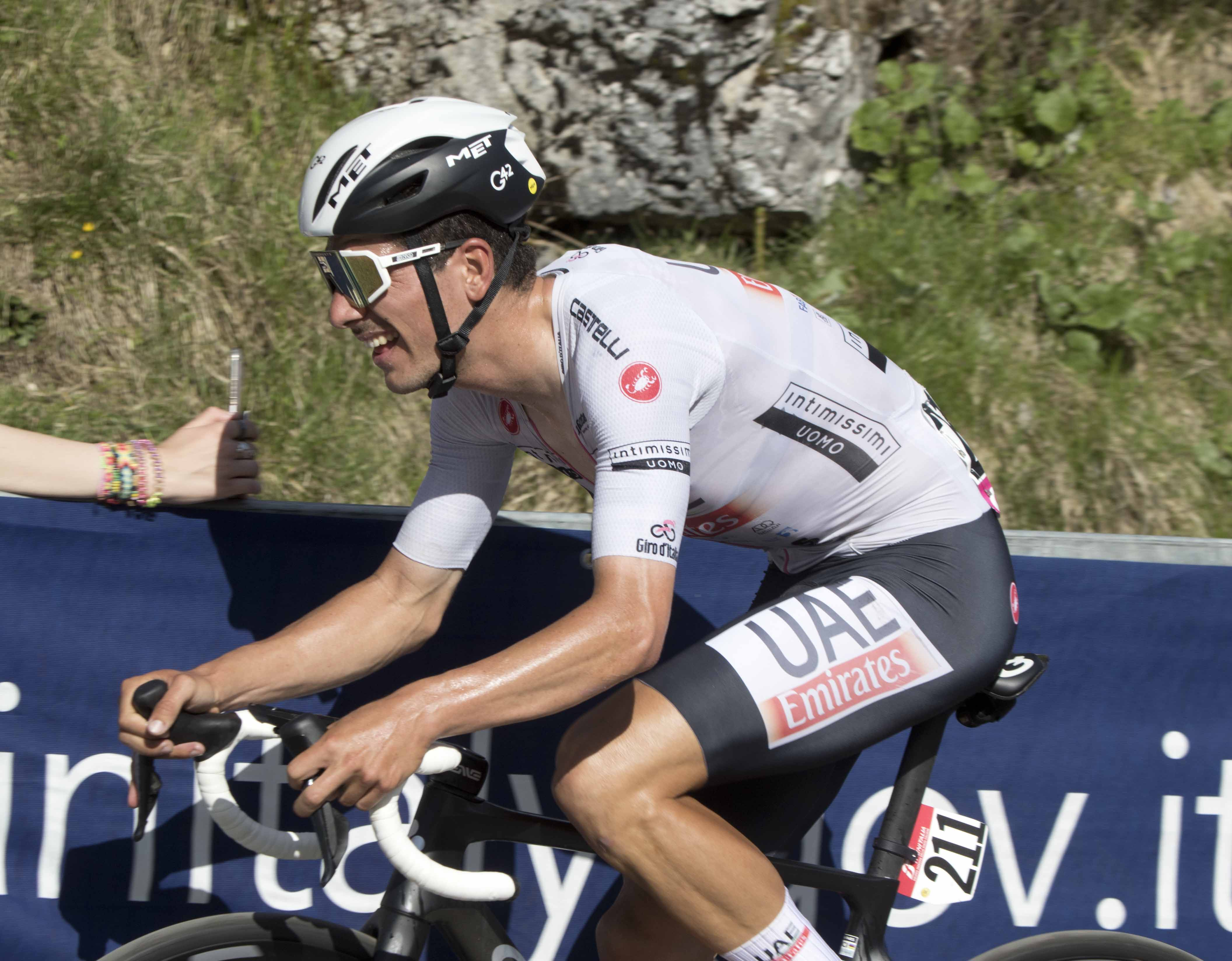
Almeida wearing the Maglia bianca at the 2023 Giro d'Italia

Almeida was in 4th place in the general classification at the Giro d'Italia when he was forced to abandon the race after stage 17 due to a positive test for COVID-19.

In June, Almeida won the Portuguese National Road Race Championships, and placed 3rd in the Time Trial. In September, he placed 5th overall in the Vuelta a España.

==== 2023 ====
Almeida placed 3rd overall in the Giro d'Italia, becoming the first Portuguese rider to reach the podium in a grand tour since Joaquim Agostinho's 3rd place finish in the 1979 Tour de France. Almeida also secured a victory in stage 16 and placed 1st in the young rider classification. For the second time, Almeida won the Portuguese National Time Trial Championships. In September, he placed 9th overall in the Vuelta a España.

==== 2024 ====
Almeida rode in the 2024 Tour de France in service of the general classification winner Tadej Pogačar, placing 4th overall and trailing 3rd place Remco Evenepoel by just under 10 minutes. He entered the 2024 Vuelta a España as Team UAE Emirates' main GC threat but was forced to withdraw before the start of stage 9 after contracting COVID-19, his second grand tour withdrawal due to the virus.

== Major results ==
2014
National Cadet Road Championships

1st Road race
1st Time trial

2015
National Junior Road Championships

1st Road race
2st Time trial

2016
National Junior Road Championships

1st Road race
1st Time trial

2017
3rd Time trial, National Under-23 Road Championships
4th Overall Toscana-Terra di Ciclismo

1st Stage 2

4th Overall Tour of Ankara
8th Overall Tour of Mersin

1st Stage 3

9th Overall Tour of Ukraine

1st Young rider classification
1st Stage 4

2018
1st Liège–Bastogne–Liège Espoirs
National Under-23 Road Championships

2nd Road race
2nd Time trial

2nd Overall Giro Ciclistico d'Italia

1st Young rider classification

5th Overall Ronde de l'Isard

1st Young rider classification

7th Overall Tour de l'Avenir
2019
National Under-23 Road Championships

1st Road race
1st Time trial

4th Overall Tour of Utah

1st Young rider classification

2020
2nd Giro dell'Emilia
3rd Overall Settimana Internazionale di Coppi e Bartali

1st Stage 1b (TTT)

3rd Overall Vuelta a Burgos
4th Overall Giro d'Italia

Held & after Stages 3–17

7th Overall Tour de l'Ain

1st Young rider classification

9th Overall Volta ao Algarve
2021 (6 pro wins)
1st Time trial, National Road Championships
1st Overall Tour de Pologne

1st Sprints classification
1st Stages 2 & 4

1st Overall Tour de Luxembourg

1st Points classification
1st Young rider classification
1st Stage 1

2nd Giro dell'Emilia
3rd Overall UAE Tour
3rd Milano–Torino
6th Overall Giro d'Italia
6th Overall Tirreno–Adriatico
7th Overall Volta a Catalunya

1st Young rider classification

10th Time trial, UEC European Road Championships
2022 (3)
National Road Championships

1st Road race
3rd Time trial

2nd Overall Vuelta a Burgos

1st Stage 5

3rd Overall Volta a Catalunya

1st Stage 4

5th Overall Vuelta a España
5th Overall UAE Tour
8th Overall Paris–Nice

1st Young rider classification

Giro d'Italia

Held after Stages 14–17
Combativity award Stage 9

2023 (2)
1st Time trial, National Road Championships
2nd Overall Tirreno–Adriatico

1st Young rider classification

2nd Overall Tour de Pologne
3rd Overall Giro d'Italia

1st Young rider classification
1st Stage 16
Combativity award Stage 16

3rd Overall Volta a Catalunya
6th Overall Volta ao Algarve
9th Overall Vuelta a España
9th Trofeo Serra de Tramuntana
2024 (2)
1st Stage 3 (TTT) Paris–Nice
2nd Overall Tour de Suisse

1st Stages 6 & 8 (ITT)

4th Overall Tour de France
9th Overall Volta a Catalunya
2025 (10)
1st Overall Tour de Suisse

1st Points classification
1st Stage 4, 7 & 8 (ITT)

1st Overall Tour of the Basque Country

1st Points classification
1st Stage 4 & 6

1st Overall Tour de Romandie
2nd Overall Vuelta a España

1st Stages 5 (TTT) & 13

2nd Overall Volta ao Algarve
2nd Overall Volta a la Comunitat Valenciana
6th Overall Paris–Nice

1st Stage 4

2026
2nd Overall Volta a la Comunitat Valenciana
3rd Overall Volta ao Algarve

=== General classification results timeline ===
Grand Tour general classification results
Grand Tour	2020	2021	2022	2023	2024	2025	2026
Giro d'Italia	4	6	DNF	3	—	—	—
Tour de France	—	—	—	—	4	DNF	
Vuelta a España	—	—	5	9	DNF	2	91
Major stage race general classification results
Major stage race	2020	2021	2022	2023	2024	2025	2026
Paris–Nice	—	—	8	—	11	6	—
Tirreno–Adriatico	—	6	—	2	—	—	—
Volta a Catalunya	NH	7	3	3	9	—	38
Tour of the Basque Country	NH	—	—	—	—	1	—
Tour de Romandie	NH	—	—	—	—	1	—
Critérium du Dauphiné	—	—	—	—	—	—	
Tour de Suisse	NH	—	—	—	2	1	

=== Major championships results timeline ===
Event		2020	2021	2022	2023	2024	2025
Olympic Games	Road race	NH	13	Not held		—	NH
Olympic Games	Time trial	NH	16	Not held		—	NH
World Championships	Road race	—	47	60	DNF	DNF	—
World Championships	Time trial	—	—	DNS	23	24	—
European Championships	Road race	—	14	—	—	—	DNF
European Championships	Time trial	—	10	—	—	—	DNS
National Championships	Road race	—	20	1	14	—	—
National Championships	Time trial	—	1	3	1	—	—

Legend
—	Did not compete
DNF	Did not finish
DNS	Did not start
NH	Not held
