= Harm Vanhoucke =

Belgian cyclist

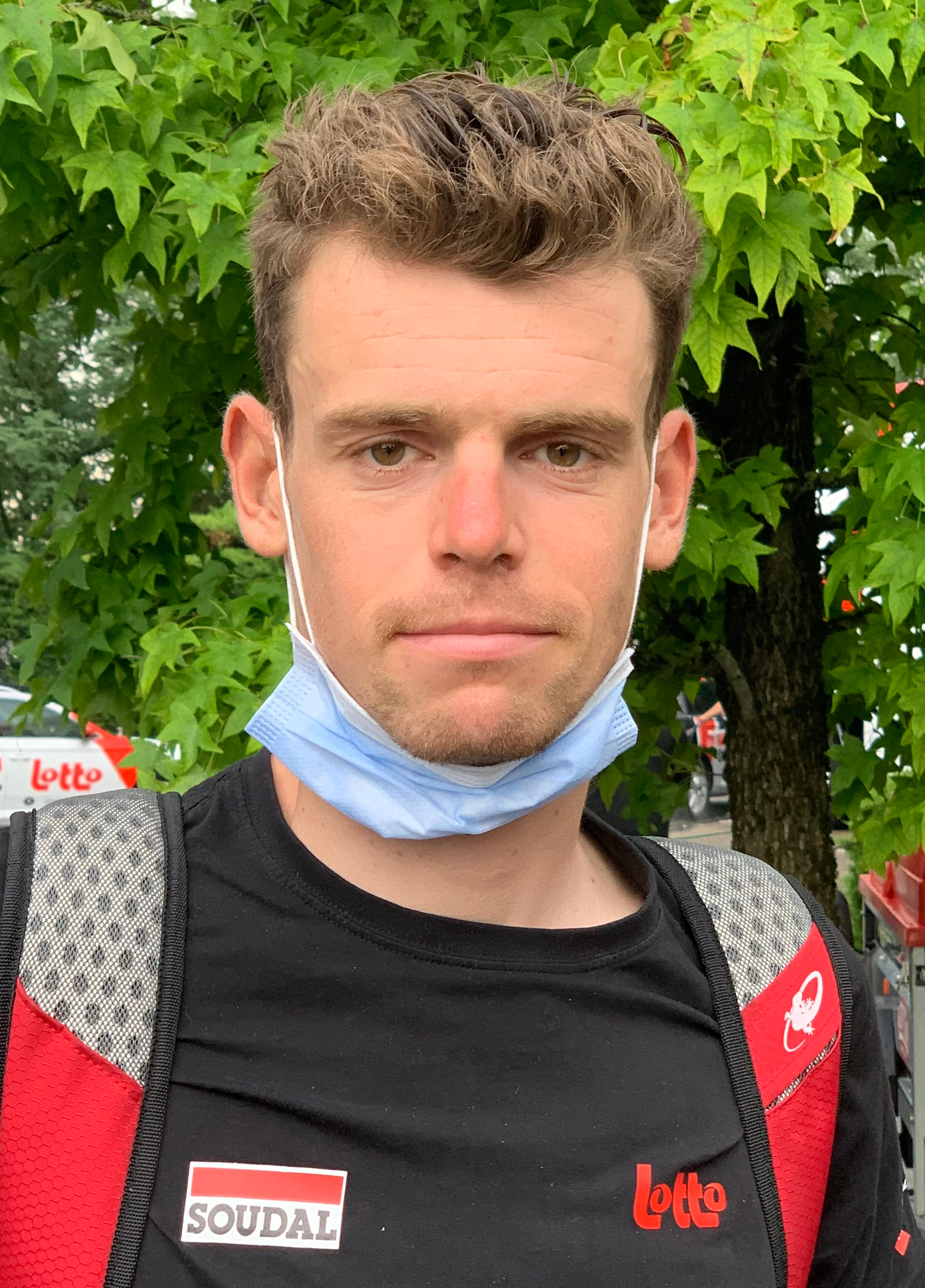
- Vanhoucke in 2021

Personal information
- Full name: Harm Vanhoucke
- Born: 17 June 1997 (age 29) Kortrijk, Belgium
- Height: 1.77 m (5 ft 10 in)
- Weight: 65 kg (143 lb)

Cycling career
- Sport: Cycling
- Current team: Pinarello–Q36.5 Pro Cycling Team
- Discipline: Road
- Role: Rider
- Rider type: Climber

Amateur team
- 2016–2018: Lotto–Soudal U23

Professional teams
- 2018–2022: Lotto–Soudal
- 2023: Team DSM
- 2023–2024: Lotto–Dstny
- 2025–: Q36.5 Pro Cycling Team

Harm Vanhoucke (born 17 June 1997 in Kortrijk) is a Belgian cyclist who currently rides for UCI ProTeam Pinarello–Q36.5 Pro Cycling Team.

On 21 March 2020, Vanhoucke was assaulted by a car driver during a training ride. He claims to have been punched several times by an aggressive heavily built man.

== Major results ==
2015
3rd Overall Oberösterreich Juniorenrundfahrt
8th Grand Prix Bati-Metallo
9th La Philippe Gilbert Juniors
10th Overall GP Général Patton
2016
1st Piccolo Giro di Lombardia
1st Stage 2 Tour des Pays de Savoie
4th Overall Tour Alsace
9th Overall Tour de l'Avenir
2017
1st Flèche Ardennaise
1st Vuelta a Navarra
3rd Overall Tour de Savoie Mont Blanc
4th Overall Grand Prix Priessnitz spa
4th Overall Ronde de l'Isard
2018
3rd Time trial, National Under-23 Road Championships
6th Overall Tour du Jura
2020
1st Mountains classification, Tour Poitou-Charentes en Nouvelle-Aquitaine
10th Overall Vuelta a Andalucía
10th Trofeo Serra de Tramuntana
2021
2nd Overall Tour de l'Ain
2022
5th Overall Tour of Turkey
2023
1st Mountains classification, Deutschland Tour
6th Overall Okolo jižních Čech

1st Stage 3

10th Overall UAE Tour
2024
3rd Mercan'Tour Classic
4th Classic Grand Besançon Doubs
5th Tour du Jura
6th Overall Tour de Hongrie
10th Volta NXT Classic
2025
5th Overall Sibiu Cycling Tour
7th Overall International Tour of Hellas

=== Grand Tour general classification results timeline ===
Grand Tour	2019	2020	2021	2022	2023	2024
Giro d'Italia	—	60	86	DNF	DNF	—
Tour de France	—	—	—	—	—	130
Vuelta a España	115	—	115	—	—	—

Legend
—	Did not compete
DNF	Did not finish
