= 2025 Tour of the Basque Country =

Spanish cycling race

2025 UCI World Tour, race 15 of 36

Race details
- Dates: 7–12 April 2025
- Stages: 6
- Distance: 855 km (531.3 mi)
- Winning time: 20h 04' 49"

Results
Jersey awarded to the overall winner	Winner	João Almeida (POR)	(UAE Team Emirates XRG)
	Second	Enric Mas (ESP)	(Movistar Team)
	Third	Maximilian Schachmann (GER)	(Soudal–Quick-Step)
Jersey awarded to the points classification winner	Points	João Almeida (POR)	(UAE Team Emirates XRG)
Jersey awarded to the mountains classification winner	Mountains	Bruno Armirail (FRA)	(Groupama–FDJ)
Jersey awarded to the youth classification winner	Youth	Isaac del Toro (MEX)	(UAE Team Emirates XRG)
Jersey awarded to the team classification winner	Team	(Belgium) Soudal–Quick-Step	

The 2025 Tour of the Basque Country (officially known as Itzulia Basque Country 2025) was a road cycling stage race that took place between 7 and 12 April in the Basque region in northern Spain. It was the 64th edition of the Tour of the Basque Country and the 15th race of the 2025 UCI World Tour.

== Teams ==
All 18 UCI WorldTeams and six UCI ProTeams made up the 24 teams that participated in the race. All teams entered a full squad of seven riders, making a total of 168 competitors.

UCI WorldTeams

- Alpecin–Deceuninck
- Arkéa–B&B Hotels
- Cofidis
- Decathlon–AG2R La Mondiale
- EF Education–EasyPost
- Groupama–FDJ
- Ineos Grenadiers
- Intermarché–Wanty
- Lidl–Trek
- Movistar Team
- Red Bull–Bora–Hansgrohe
- Soudal–Quick-Step
- Team Bahrain Victorious
- Team Jayco–AlUla
- Team Picnic PostNL
- UAE Team Emirates XRG
- Visma–Lease a Bike
- XDS Astana Team

UCI ProTeams

- Burgos Burpellet BH
- Caja Rural–Seguros RGA
- Equipo Kern Pharma
- Euskaltel–Euskadi
- Team TotalEnergies
- Tudor Pro Cycling Team

== Route ==
Stage characteristics and winners
Stage	Date	Course	Distance	Type	Winner
1	7 April	Vitoria-Gasteiz to Vitoria-Gasteiz	16.5 km (10.3 mi)	Individual time trial	Maximilian Schachmann (GER)
2	8 April	Pamplona to Lodosa	186.6 km (115.9 mi)	Hilly stage	Caleb Ewan (AUS)
3	9 April	Zarautz to Beasain	155.6 km (96.7 mi)	Medium mountain stage	Alex Aranburu (ESP)
4	10 April	Beasain to Markina-Xemein	169.6 km (105.4 mi)	Medium mountain stage	João Almeida (POR)
5	11 April	Urduña to Gernika-Lumo	172.3 km (107.1 mi)	Medium mountain stage	Ben Healy (IRL)
6	12 April	Eibar to Eibar	153.4 km (95.3 mi)	Mountain stage	João Almeida (POR)
Total			855 km (531 mi)		

== Stages ==
=== Stage 1 ===
7 April 2025 — Vitoria-Gasteiz to Vitoria-Gasteiz, 16.5 km (10.3 mi) (ITT)

Stage 1 Result
Rank	Rider	Team	Time
1	Maximilian Schachmann (GER)	Soudal–Quick-Step	18' 37"
2	João Almeida (POR)	UAE Team Emirates XRG	+ 0"
3	Florian Lipowitz (GER)	Red Bull–Bora–Hansgrohe	+ 1"
4	Ethan Hayter (GBR)	Soudal–Quick-Step	+ 6"
5	Aleksandr Vlasov	Red Bull–Bora–Hansgrohe	+ 10"
6	Ilan Van Wilder (BEL)	Soudal–Quick-Step	+ 11"
7	Victor Campenaerts (BEL)	Visma–Lease a Bike	+ 12"
8	Mattias Skjelmose (DEN)	Lidl–Trek	+ 12"
9	Bruno Armirail (FRA)	Groupama–FDJ	+ 13"
10	Michael Leonard (CAN)	Ineos Grenadiers	+ 16"

General classification after Stage 1
Rank	Rider	Team	Time
1	Maximilian Schachmann (GER)	Soudal–Quick-Step	18' 37"
2	João Almeida (POR)	UAE Team Emirates XRG	+ 0"
3	Florian Lipowitz (GER)	Red Bull–Bora–Hansgrohe	+ 1"
4	Ethan Hayter (GBR)	Soudal–Quick-Step	+ 6"
5	Aleksandr Vlasov	Red Bull–Bora–Hansgrohe	+ 10"
6	Ilan Van Wilder (BEL)	Soudal–Quick-Step	+ 11"
7	Victor Campenaerts (BEL)	Visma–Lease a Bike	+ 12"
8	Mattias Skjelmose (DEN)	Lidl–Trek	+ 12"
9	Bruno Armirail (FRA)	Groupama–FDJ	+ 13"
10	Michael Leonard (CAN)	Ineos Grenadiers	+ 16"

=== Stage 2 ===
8 April 2025 — Pamplona to Lodosa, 186.6 km (115.9 mi)

Stage 2 Result
Rank	Rider	Team	Time
1	Caleb Ewan (AUS)	Ineos Grenadiers	4h 13' 50"
2	Luca Van Boven (BEL)	Intermarché–Wanty	+ 0"
3	Bastien Tronchon (FRA)	Decathlon–AG2R La Mondiale	+ 0"
4	Thibaud Gruel (FRA)	Groupama–FDJ	+ 0"
5	Iúri Leitão (POR)	Caja Rural–Seguros RGA	+ 0"
6	Axel Zingle (FRA)	Visma–Lease a Bike	+ 0"
7	Fabio Van den Bossche (BEL)	Alpecin–Deceuninck	+ 0"
8	Luc Wirtgen (LUX)	Tudor Pro Cycling Team	+ 0"
9	Jon Aberasturi (ESP)	Euskaltel–Euskadi	+ 0"
10	Anders Foldager (DEN)	Team Jayco–AlUla	+ 0"

General classification after Stage 2
Rank	Rider	Team	Time
1	Maximilian Schachmann (GER)	Soudal–Quick-Step	4h 32' 27"
2	João Almeida (POR)	UAE Team Emirates XRG	+ 0"
3	Florian Lipowitz (GER)	Red Bull–Bora–Hansgrohe	+ 1"
4	Ethan Hayter (GBR)	Soudal–Quick-Step	+ 6"
5	Aleksandr Vlasov	Red Bull–Bora–Hansgrohe	+ 10"
6	Ilan Van Wilder (BEL)	Soudal–Quick-Step	+ 11"
7	Victor Campenaerts (BEL)	Visma–Lease a Bike	+ 12"
8	Mattias Skjelmose (DEN)	Lidl–Trek	+ 12"
9	Bruno Armirail (FRA)	Groupama–FDJ	+ 13"
10	Michael Leonard (CAN)	Ineos Grenadiers	+ 16"

=== Stage 3 ===
9 April 2025 — Zarautz to Beasain, 155.6 km (96.7 mi)

Stage 3 Result
Rank	Rider	Team	Time
1	Alex Aranburu (ESP)	Cofidis	3h 45' 21"
2	Romain Grégoire (FRA)	Groupama–FDJ	+ 3"
3	Maximilian Schachmann (GER)	Soudal–Quick-Step	+ 3"
4	João Almeida (POR)	UAE Team Emirates XRG	+ 3"
5	Enric Mas (ESP)	Movistar Team	+ 3"
6	Mattias Skjelmose (DEN)	Lidl–Trek	+ 3"
7	Wilco Kelderman (NED)	Visma–Lease a Bike	+ 3"
8	Florian Lipowitz (GER)	Red Bull–Bora–Hansgrohe	+ 3"
9	Steff Cras (BEL)	Team TotalEnergies	+ 3"
10	Ilan Van Wilder (BEL)	Soudal–Quick-Step	+ 3"

General classification after Stage 3
Rank	Rider	Team	Time
1	Maximilian Schachmann (GER)	Soudal–Quick-Step	8h 17' 47"
2	Florian Lipowitz (GER)	Red Bull–Bora–Hansgrohe	+ 4"
3	João Almeida (POR)	UAE Team Emirates XRG	+ 4"
4	Ilan Van Wilder (BEL)	Soudal–Quick-Step	+ 15"
5	Mattias Skjelmose (DEN)	Lidl–Trek	+ 16"
6	Wilco Kelderman (NED)	Visma–Lease a Bike	+ 37"
7	Romain Grégoire (FRA)	Groupama–FDJ	+ 40"
8	Steff Cras (BEL)	Team TotalEnergies	+ 46"
9	Alex Aranburu (ESP)	Cofidis	+ 1' 03"
10	Enric Mas (ESP)	Movistar Team	+ 1' 14"

=== Stage 4 ===
10 April 2025 — Beasain to Markina-Xemein, 169.6 km (105.4 mi)

Stage 4 Result
Rank	Rider	Team	Time
1	João Almeida (POR)	UAE Team Emirates XRG	3h 52' 39"
2	Isaac del Toro (MEX)	UAE Team Emirates XRG	+ 28"
3	Maximilian Schachmann (GER)	Soudal–Quick-Step	+ 28"
4	Clément Champoussin (FRA)	XDS Astana Team	+ 28"
5	Alex Aranburu (ESP)	Cofidis	+ 28"
6	Clément Berthet (FRA)	Decathlon–AG2R La Mondiale	+ 28"
7	Simone Velasco (ITA)	XDS Astana Team	+ 28"
8	Oscar Onley (GBR)	Team Picnic PostNL	+ 28"
9	Ilan Van Wilder (BEL)	Soudal–Quick-Step	+ 28"
10	Guillaume Martin (FRA)	Groupama–FDJ	+ 28"

General classification after Stage 4
Rank	Rider	Team	Time
1	João Almeida (POR)	UAE Team Emirates XRG	12h 10' 20"
2	Maximilian Schachmann (GER)	Soudal–Quick-Step	+ 30"
3	Florian Lipowitz (GER)	Red Bull–Bora–Hansgrohe	+ 38"
4	Ilan Van Wilder (BEL)	Soudal–Quick-Step	+ 49"
5	Mattias Skjelmose (DEN)	Lidl–Trek	+ 50"
6	Wilco Kelderman (NED)	Visma–Lease a Bike	+ 1' 11"
7	Alex Aranburu (ESP)	Cofidis	+ 1' 37"
8	Enric Mas (ESP)	Movistar Team	+ 1' 48"
9	Steff Cras (BEL)	Team TotalEnergies	+ 2' 15"
10	Simone Velasco (ITA)	XDS Astana Team	+ 2' 18"

=== Stage 5 ===
11 April 2025 — Urduña to Gemika-Lumo, 172.3 km (107.1 mi)

Stage 5 Result
Rank	Rider	Team	Time
1	Ben Healy (IRL)	EF Education–EasyPost	3h 55' 57"
2	Axel Laurance (FRA)	Ineos Grenadiers	+ 1' 47"
3	Simone Velasco (ITA)	XDS Astana Team	+ 1' 48"
4	Alex Aranburu (ESP)	Cofidis	+ 1' 48"
5	Romain Grégoire (FRA)	Groupama–FDJ	+ 1' 48"
6	Maxim Van Gils (BEL)	Red Bull–Bora–Hansgrohe	+ 1' 48"
7	Pau Miquel (ESP)	Equipo Kern Pharma	+ 1' 48"
8	Jordan Jegat (FRA)	Team TotalEnergies	+ 1' 48"
9	Clément Champoussin (FRA)	XDS Astana Team	+ 1' 48"
10	Guillermo Thomas Silva (URU)	Caja Rural–Seguros RGA	+ 1' 48"

General classification after Stage 5
Rank	Rider	Team	Time
1	João Almeida (POR)	UAE Team Emirates XRG	16h 08' 05"
2	Maximilian Schachmann (GER)	Soudal–Quick-Step	+ 30"
3	Florian Lipowitz (GER)	Red Bull–Bora–Hansgrohe	+ 38"
4	Ilan Van Wilder (BEL)	Soudal–Quick-Step	+ 49"
5	Mattias Skjelmose (DEN)	Lidl–Trek	+ 50"
6	Wilco Kelderman (NED)	Visma–Lease a Bike	+ 1' 11"
7	Alex Aranburu (ESP)	Cofidis	+ 1' 37"
8	Enric Mas (ESP)	Movistar Team	+ 1' 48"
9	Simone Velasco (ITA)	XDS Astana Team	+ 2' 14"
10	Steff Cras (BEL)	Team TotalEnergies	+ 2' 15"

=== Stage 6 ===
12 April 2025 — Eibar to Eibar, 153.4 km (95.3 mi)

Stage 6 Result
Rank	Rider	Team	Time
1	João Almeida (POR)	UAE Team Emirates XRG	3h 56' 54"
2	Enric Mas (ESP)	Movistar Team	+ 0"
3	Ben Healy (IRL)	EF Education–EasyPost	+ 13"
4	Isaac del Toro (MEX)	UAE Team Emirates XRG	+ 28"
5	Alex Aranburu (ESP)	Cofidis	+ 58"
6	Jordan Jegat (FRA)	Team TotalEnergies	+ 58"
7	Simone Velasco (ITA)	XDS Astana Team	+ 1' 19"
8	Oscar Onley (GBR)	Team Picnic PostNL	+ 1' 19"
9	Felix Großschartner (AUT)	UAE Team Emirates XRG	+ 1' 19"
10	Clément Champoussin (FRA)	XDS Astana Team	+ 1' 19"

General classification after Stage 6
Rank	Rider	Team	Time
1	João Almeida (POR)	UAE Team Emirates XRG	20h 04' 49"
2	Enric Mas (ESP)	Movistar Team	+ 1' 52"
3	Maximilian Schachmann (GER)	Soudal–Quick-Step	+ 1' 59"
4	Florian Lipowitz (GER)	Red Bull–Bora–Hansgrohe	+ 2' 07"
5	Mattias Skjelmose (DEN)	Lidl–Trek	+ 2' 17"
6	Ilan Van Wilder (BEL)	Soudal–Quick-Step	+ 2' 18"
7	Alex Aranburu (ESP)	Cofidis	+ 2' 45"
8	Guillaume Martin (FRA)	Groupama–FDJ	+ 3' 42"
9	Simone Velasco (ITA)	XDS Astana Team	+ 3' 43"
10	Oscar Onley (GBR)	Team Picnic PostNL	+ 3' 50"

== Classification leadership table ==
Classification leadership by stage
Stage	Winner	General classification	Points classification	Mountains classification	Young rider classification	Basque rider classification	Team classification	Combativity award
1	Maximilian Schachmann	Maximilian Schachmann	Maximilian Schachmann	Maximilian Schachmann	Michael Leonard	Pello Bilbao	Soudal–Quick-Step	Florian Lipowitz
2	Caleb Ewan	Maximilian Schachmann	Maximilian Schachmann	Diego Uriarte	Michael Leonard	Pello Bilbao	Soudal–Quick-Step	Tobias Bayer
3	Alex Aranburu	Maximilian Schachmann	Maximilian Schachmann	Bruno Armirail	Romain Grégoire	Alex Aranburu	Soudal–Quick-Step	Clément Berthet
4	João Almeida	João Almeida	João Almeida	Marc Soler	Brieuc Rolland	Alex Aranburu	XDS Astana Team	Marc Soler
5	Ben Healy	João Almeida	João Almeida	Bruno Armirail	Brieuc Rolland	Alex Aranburu	XDS Astana Team	Ben Healy
6	João Almeida	João Almeida	João Almeida	Bruno Armirail	Isaac del Toro	Alex Aranburu	Soudal–Quick-Step	Bruno Armirail
Final		João Almeida	João Almeida	Bruno Armirail	Isaac del Toro	Alex Aranburu	Soudal Quick-Step	Bruno Armirail

== Classification standings ==
Legend
Denotes the winner of the general classification	Denotes the winner of the young rider classification
Denotes the winner of the points classification	Denotes the winner of the team classification
Denotes the winner of the mountains classification	Denotes the winner of the combativity award

=== General classification ===
Final general classification (1–10)
Rank	Rider	Team	Time
1	João Almeida (POR)	UAE Team Emirates XRG	20h 04' 49"
2	Enric Mas (ESP)	Movistar Team	+ 1' 52"
3	Maximilian Schachmann (GER)	Soudal–Quick-Step	+ 1' 59"
4	Florian Lipowitz (GER)	Red Bull–Bora–Hansgrohe	+ 2' 07"
5	Mattias Skjelmose (DEN)	Lidl–Trek	+ 2' 17"
6	Ilan Van Wilder (BEL)	Soudal–Quick-Step	+ 2' 18"
7	Alex Aranburu (ESP)	Cofidis	+ 2' 45"
8	Simone Velasco (ITA)	XDS Astana Team	+ 3' 43"
9	Oscar Onley (GBR)	Team Picnic PostNL	+ 3' 50"
10	Clément Champoussin (FRA)	XDS Astana Team	+ 3' 55"

=== Points classification ===
Final points classification (1–10)
Rank	Rider	Team	Time
1	João Almeida (POR)	UAE Team Emirates XRG	84
2	Alex Aranburu (ESP)	Cofidis	67
3	Ben Healy (IRL)	EF Education–EasyPost	66
4	Maximilian Schachmann (GER)	Soudal–Quick-Step	61
5	Isaac del Toro (MEX)	UAE Team Emirates XRG	45
6	Simone Velasco (ITA)	XDS Astana Team	39
7	Enric Mas (ESP)	Movistar Team	35
8	Florian Lipowitz (GER)	Red Bull–Bora–Hansgrohe	32
9	Romain Grégoire (FRA)	Groupama–FDJ	32
10	Jordan Jegat (FRA)	Team TotalEnergies	31

=== Mountains classification ===
Final mountains classification (1–10)
Rank	Rider	Team	Time
1	Bruno Armirail (FRA)	Decathlon–AG2R La Mondiale	57
2	Ben Healy (IRL)	EF Education–EasyPost	25
3	Marc Soler (ESP)	UAE Team Emirates XRG	23
4	Enric Mas (ESP)	Movistar Team	20
5	João Almeida (POR)	UAE Team Emirates XRG	18
6	Sergio Samitier (ESP)	Cofidis	11
7	Jordan Jegat (FRA)	Team TotalEnergies	10
8	Daniel Martínez (COL)	Red Bull–Bora–Hansgrohe	9
9	Juan Guillermo Martínez (COL)	Team Picnic PostNL	8
10	Brandon McNulty (USA)	UAE Team Emirates XRG	6

=== Young rider classification ===
Final young rider classification (1–10)
Rank	Rider	Team	Time
1	Isaac del Toro (MEX)	UAE Team Emirates XRG	20h 09' 44"
2	Brieuc Rolland (FRA)	Groupama–FDJ	+ 3' 48"
3	Romain Grégoire (FRA)	Groupama–FDJ	+ 4' 37"
4	Léo Bisiaux (FRA)	Decathlon–AG2R La Mondiale	+ 4' 38"
5	Hugo de la Calle (ESP)	Burgos Burpellet BH	+ 19' 25"
6	Max van der Meulen (NED)	Team Bahrain Victorious	+ 27' 22"
7	Alexander Hajek (AUT)	Red Bull–Bora–Hansgrohe	+ 35' 58"
8	Juan Guillermo Martínez (COL)	Team Picnic PostNL	+ 36' 00"
9	Thibaud Gruel (FRA)	Groupama–FDJ	+ 37' 01"
10	Bjoern Koerdt (GBR)	Team Picnic PostNL	+ 44' 48"

=== Basque rider classification ===
Final Basque rider classification (1–10)
Rank	Rider	Team	Time
1	Alex Aranburu (ESP)	Cofidis	20h 07' 34"
2	Unai Iribar (ESP)	Equipo Kern Pharma	+ 6' 31"
3	Gotzon Martín (ESP)	Euskaltel–Euskadi	+ 21' 27"
4	Ander Okamika (ESP)	Burgos Burpellet BH	+ 25' 51"
5	Mikel Bizkarra (ESP)	Euskaltel–Euskadi	+ 27' 33"
6	Julen Arriola-Bengoa (ESP)	Caja Rural–Seguros RGA	+ 33' 25"
7	Ion Izagirre (ESP)	Cofidis	+ 35' 17"
8	Txomin Juaristi (ESP)	Euskaltel–Euskadi	+ 39' 26"
9	Omar Fraile (ESP)	Ineos Grenadiers	+ 41' 07"
10	Pello Bilbao (ESP)	Team Bahrain Victorious	+ 43' 06"

=== Team classification ===
Final team classification (1–10)
Rank	Team	Time
1	(Belgium) Soudal–Quick-Step	60h 27' 39"
2	(Kazakhstan) XDS Astana Team	+ 3' 04"
3	(France) Groupama–FDJ	+ 7' 21"
4	(United Arab Emirates) UAE Team Emirates XRG	+ 8' 26"
5	(United States) Lidl–Trek	+ 19' 31"
6	(France) Team TotalEnergies	+ 26' 05"
7	(Germany) Red Bull–Bora–Hansgrohe	+ 27' 06"
8	(France) Decathlon–AG2R La Mondiale	+ 27' 20"
9	(Spain) Burgos Burpellet BH	+ 30' 45"
10	(Spain) Equipo Kern Pharma	+ 33' 29"
