= 2025 Movistar Team (men's team) season =

Movistar Team
- 2025 season
- UCI code: MOV
- Status: UCI WorldTeam
- Manager: Eusebio Unzué (ESP)
- Main sponsor(s): Movistar
- Based: Spain
- Bicycles: Canyon
- Groupset: SRAM

Season victories
- Stage race stages: 5
- National Championships: 4
- Most wins: (Spain) Iván Romeo (3)

The 2025 season for the Movistar Team is the 46th season in the team's existence and the 15th season under the current name. The team has been a UCI WorldTeam since 2005, when the tier was first established.

== Team roster ==
As of 21 January 2025.

| Rider | Date of birth |
|---|---|
| Orluis Aular (VEN) | 5 November 1996 (aged 28) |
| Jorge Arcas (ESP) | 8 July 1992 (aged 32) |
| Jon Barrenetxea (ESP) | 20 April 2000 (aged 24) |
| Will Barta (USA) | 4 January 1996 (aged 28) |
| Carlos Canal (ESP) | 28 June 2001 (aged 23) |
| Pablo Castrillo (ESP) | 2 January 2001 (aged 23) |
| Jefferson Alveiro Cepeda (ECU) | 2 March 1996 (aged 28) |
| Davide Cimolai (ITA) | 13 August 1989 (aged 35) |
| Davide Formolo (ITA) | 25 October 1992 (aged 32) |
| Iván García Cortina (ESP) | 20 November 1995 (aged 29) |
| Fernando Gaviria (COL) | 19 August 1994 (aged 30) |
| Ruben Guerreiro (POR) | 6 July 1994 (aged 30) |
| Michel Hessmann (GER) | 6 April 2001 (aged 23) |
| Enric Mas (ESP) | 7 January 1995 (aged 29) |
| Lorenzo Milesi (ITA) | 19 March 2002 (aged 22) |

| Rider | Date of birth |
|---|---|
| Manlio Moro (ITA) | 17 March 2002 (aged 22) |
| Gregor Mühlberger (AUT) | 4 April 1994 (aged 30) |
| Mathias Norsgaard (DEN) | 5 May 1997 (aged 27) |
| Nelson Oliveira (POR) | 6 March 1989 (aged 35) |
| Antonio Pedrero (ESP) | 23 October 1991 (aged 33) |
| Diego Pescador (COL) | 21 December 2002 (aged 22) |
| Nairo Quintana (COL) | 4 February 1990 (aged 34) |
| Iván Romeo (ESP) | 16 August 2003 (aged 21) |
| Javier Romo (ESP) | 6 January 1999 (aged 25) |
| Einer Rubio (COL) | 22 February 1998 (aged 26) |
| Pelayo Sánchez (ESP) | 27 March 2000 (aged 24) |
| Gonzalo Serrano (ESP) | 17 August 1994 (aged 30) |
| Natnael Tesfatsion (ERI) | 23 May 1999 (aged 25) |
| Albert Torres (ESP) | 26 April 1990 (aged 34) |

== Season victories ==
| Date | Race | Competition | Rider | Country | Location | Ref. |
|---|---|---|---|---|---|---|
| 23 January | Tour Down Under, stage 3 | UCI World Tour | Javier Romo (ESP) | Australia | Uraidla | |
| 7 February | Volta a la Comunitat Valenciana, stage 3 | UCI ProSeries | Iván Romeo (ESP) | Spain | Alpuente | |
| 23 February | Vuelta a Andalucía, stage 5 | UCI ProSeries | Jon Barrenetxea (ESP) | Spain | La Línea de la Concepción | |
| 25 April | Vuelta a Asturias, stage 2 | UCI Europe Tour | Iván García Cortina (ESP) | Spain | Pola de Lena | |
| 10 June | Critérium du Dauphiné, stage 3 | UCI World Tour | Iván Romeo (ESP) | France | Charantonnay | |

== National, Continental, and World Champions ==
| Date | Discipline | Jersey | Rider | Country | Location | Ref. |
|---|---|---|---|---|---|---|
| 31 January | Ecuadorian National Time Trial Championships | | Jefferson Alveiro Cepeda (ECU) | Ecuador | Atuntaqui | |
| 26 June | Venezuelan National Time Trial Championships | | Orluis Aular (VEN) | Venezuela | San Felipe | |
| 29 June | Spanish National Road Race Championships | | Iván Romeo (ESP) | Spain | Granada | |
| 29 June | Venezuelan National Road Race Championships | | Orluis Aular (VEN) | Venezuela | | |
