= 2023 Tour of the Basque Country =

Spanish cycling race

2023 UCI World Tour, race 15 of 35

Race details
- Dates: 3–8 April 2023
- Stages: 6
- Distance: 992.5 km (616.7 mi)
- Winning time: 24h 45' 24"

Results
Jersey awarded to the overall winner	Winner	Jonas Vingegaard (DEN)	(Team Jumbo–Visma)
	Second	Mikel Landa (ESP)	(Team Bahrain Victorious)
	Third	Ion Izagirre (ESP)	(Cofidis)
Jersey awarded to the points classification winner	Points	Jonas Vingegaard (DEN)	(Team Jumbo–Visma)
Jersey awarded to the mountains classification winner	Mountains	Jon Barrenetxea (ESP)	(Caja Rural–Seguros RGA)
Jersey awarded to the youth classification winner	Youth	Brandon McNulty (USA)	(UAE Team Emirates)
Jersey awarded to the team classification winner	Team	(Belgium) Soudal–Quick-Step	

The 2023 Tour of the Basque Country (officially known as Itzulia Basque Country 2023) was a road cycling stage race that took place between 3 and 8 April 2023 in the titular region in northern Spain. It was the 62nd edition of the Tour of the Basque Country and the 15th race of the 2023 UCI World Tour.

== Teams ==
All 18 UCI WorldTeams and five UCI ProTeams made up the 23 teams that participated in the race. All teams entered a full squad of seven riders.

UCI WorldTeams

- AG2R Citroën Team
- Alpecin–Deceuninck
- Arkéa–Samsic
- Astana Qazaqstan Team
- Bora–Hansgrohe
- Cofidis
- EF Education–EasyPost
- Groupama–FDJ
- Ineos Grenadiers
- Intermarché–Circus–Wanty
- Movistar Team
- Soudal–Quick-Step
- Team Bahrain Victorious
- Team DSM
- Team Jayco–AlUla
- Team Jumbo–Visma
- Trek–Segafredo
- UAE Team Emirates

UCI ProTeams

- Burgos BH
- Caja Rural–Seguros RGA
- Equipo Kern Pharma
- Euskaltel–Euskadi
- Team TotalEnergies

== Route ==
Stage characteristics and winners
Stage	Date	Course	Distance	Type	Winner
1	3 April	Vitoria-Gasteiz to Labastida	165.4 km (102.8 mi)	Medium mountain stage	Ethan Hayter (GBR)
2	4 April	Viana to Leitza	193.8 km (120.4 mi)	Mountain stage	Ide Schelling (NED)
3	5 April	Errenteria to Amasa-Villabona	153.9 km (95.6 mi)	Medium mountain stage	Jonas Vingegaard (DEN)
4	6 April	Santurtzi to Santurtzi	175.7 km (109.2 mi)	Medium mountain stage	Jonas Vingegaard (DEN)
5	7 April	Amorebieta-Etxano to Amorebieta-Etxano	165.9 km (103.1 mi)	Mountain stage	Sergio Higuita (COL)
6	8 April	Eibar to Eibar	137.8 km (85.6 mi)	Mountain stage	Jonas Vingegaard (DEN)
Total			992.5 km (616.7 mi)		

== Stages ==
=== Stage 1 ===
3 April 2023 — Vitoria-Gasteiz to Labastida, 165.4 km (102.8 mi)

Stage 1 Result (1–10)
Rank	Rider	Team	Time
1	Ethan Hayter (GBR)	Ineos Grenadiers	4h 01' 24"
2	Mauro Schmid (SUI)	Soudal–Quick-Step	+ 0"
3	Jon Aberasturi (ESP)	Trek–Segafredo	+ 0"
4	Alex Aranburu (ESP)	Movistar Team	+ 0"
5	Orluis Aular (VEN)	Caja Rural–Seguros RGA	+ 0"
6	Richard Carapaz (ECU)	EF Education–EasyPost	+ 0"
7	Quinten Hermans (BEL)	Alpecin–Deceuninck	+ 0"
8	Gonzalo Serrano (ESP)	Movistar Team	+ 0"
9	Mattias Skjelmose (DEN)	Trek–Segafredo	+ 0"
10	Christian Scaroni (ITA)	Astana Qazaqstan Team	+ 0"

General classification after Stage 1 (1–10)
Rank	Rider	Team	Time
1	Ethan Hayter (GBR)	Ineos Grenadiers	4h 01' 14"
2	Mauro Schmid (SUI)	Soudal–Quick-Step	+ 4"
3	Jon Aberasturi (ESP)	Trek–Segafredo	+ 6"
4	Daniel Martínez (COL)	Ineos Grenadiers	+ 7"
5	Jonas Vingegaard (DEN)	Team Jumbo–Visma	+ 8"
6	Marc Soler (ESP)	UAE Team Emirates	+ 9"
7	Cristián Rodríguez (ESP)	Arkéa–Samsic	+ 9"
8	Alex Aranburu (ESP)	Movistar Team	+ 10"
9	Orluis Aular (VEN)	Caja Rural–Seguros RGA	+ 10"
10	Richard Carapaz (ECU)	EF Education–EasyPost	+ 10"

=== Stage 2 ===
4 April 2023 — Viana to Leitza, 193.8 km (120.4 mi)

Stage 2 Result (1–10)
Rank	Rider	Team	Time
1	Ide Schelling (NED)	Bora–Hansgrohe	4h 53' 53"
2	Matteo Sobrero (ITA)	Team Jayco–AlUla	+ 0"
3	David Gaudu (FRA)	Groupama–FDJ	+ 0"
4	Alex Aranburu (ESP)	Movistar Team	+ 0"
5	Brandon McNulty (USA)	UAE Team Emirates	+ 0"
6	Andrea Bagioli (ITA)	Soudal–Quick-Step	+ 0"
7	Rigoberto Urán (COL)	EF Education–EasyPost	+ 0"
8	Christian Scaroni (ITA)	Astana Qazaqstan Team	+ 0"
9	Simon Guglielmi (FRA)	Arkéa–Samsic	+ 0"
10	Ruben Guerreiro (POR)	Movistar Team	+ 0"

General classification after Stage 2 (1–10)
Rank	Rider	Team	Time
1	Ide Schelling (NED)	Bora–Hansgrohe	8h 54' 47"
2	Matteo Sobrero (ITA)	Team Jayco–AlUla	+ 4"
3	David Gaudu (FRA)	Groupama–FDJ	+ 6"
4	Mikel Landa (ESP)	Team Bahrain Victorious	+ 7"
5	Jonas Vingegaard (DEN)	Team Jumbo–Visma	+ 8"
6	Alex Aranburu (ESP)	Movistar Team	+ 10"
7	Andrea Bagioli (ITA)	Soudal–Quick-Step	+ 10"
8	Christian Scaroni (ITA)	Astana Qazaqstan Team	+ 10"
9	Mattias Skjelmose (DEN)	Trek–Segafredo	+ 10"
10	Richard Carapaz (ECU)	EF Education–EasyPost	+ 10"

=== Stage 3 ===
5 April 2023 — Errenteria to Amasa-Villabona, 162.2 km (100.8 mi)

Stage 3 Result (1–10)
Rank	Rider	Team	Time
1	Jonas Vingegaard (DEN)	Team Jumbo–Visma	3h 51' 58"
2	Mikel Landa (ESP)	Team Bahrain Victorious	+ 2"
3	Enric Mas (ESP)	Movistar Team	+ 2"
4	Ion Izagirre (ESP)	Cofidis	+ 8"
5	David Gaudu (FRA)	Groupama–FDJ	+ 8"
6	Mattias Skjelmose (DEN)	Trek–Segafredo	+ 10"
7	Felix Gall (AUT)	AG2R Citroën Team	+ 12"
8	Andrea Bagioli (ITA)	Soudal–Quick-Step	+ 13"
9	Simon Yates (GBR)	Team Jayco–AlUla	+ 13"
10	Alex Aranburu (ESP)	Movistar Team	+ 13"

General classification after Stage 3 (1–10)
Rank	Rider	Team	Time
1	Jonas Vingegaard (DEN)	Team Jumbo–Visma	12h 46' 53"
2	Mikel Landa (ESP)	Team Bahrain Victorious	+ 5"
3	David Gaudu (FRA)	Groupama–FDJ	+ 16"
4	Matteo Sobrero (ITA)	Team Jayco–AlUla	+ 18"
5	Ion Izagirre (ESP)	Cofidis	+ 20"
6	Enric Mas (ESP)	Movistar Team	+ 21"
7	Mattias Skjelmose (DEN)	Trek–Segafredo	+ 22"
8	Alex Aranburu (ESP)	Movistar Team	+ 25"
9	Andrea Bagioli (ITA)	Soudal–Quick-Step	+ 25"
10	Rémy Rochas (FRA)	Cofidis	+ 25"

=== Stage 4 ===
6 April 2023 — Santurtzi to Santurtzi, 175.7 km (109.2 mi)

Stage 4 Result (1–10)
Rank	Rider	Team	Time
1	Jonas Vingegaard (DEN)	Team Jumbo–Visma	4h 22' 26"
2	Mikel Landa (ESP)	Team Bahrain Victorious	+ 0"
3	Mauro Schmid (SUI)	Soudal–Quick-Step	+ 2"
4	Matteo Sobrero (ITA)	Team Jayco–AlUla	+ 2"
5	Brandon McNulty (USA)	UAE Team Emirates	+ 2"
6	Rigoberto Urán (COL)	EF Education–EasyPost	+ 2"
7	David Gaudu (FRA)	Groupama–FDJ	+ 2"
8	Felix Gall (AUT)	AG2R Citroën Team	+ 2"
9	Clément Champoussin (FRA)	Arkéa–Samsic	+ 2"
10	Mattias Skjelmose (DEN)	Trek–Segafredo	+ 2"

General classification after Stage 4 (1–10)
Rank	Rider	Team	Time
1	Jonas Vingegaard (DEN)	Team Jumbo–Visma	17h 08' 56"
2	Mikel Landa (ESP)	Team Bahrain Victorious	+ 12"
3	David Gaudu (FRA)	Groupama–FDJ	+ 31"
4	Matteo Sobrero (ITA)	Team Jayco–AlUla	+ 33"
5	Ion Izagirre (ESP)	Cofidis	+ 33"
6	Enric Mas (ESP)	Movistar Team	+ 36"
7	Mattias Skjelmose (DEN)	Trek–Segafredo	+ 37"
8	Brandon McNulty (USA)	UAE Team Emirates	+ 38"
9	Simon Yates (GBR)	Team Jayco–AlUla	+ 39"
10	James Knox (GBR)	Soudal–Quick-Step	+ 46"

=== Stage 5 ===
7 April 2023 — Amorebieta-Etxano to Amorebieta-Etxano, 165.9 km (103.1 mi)

Stage 5 Result (1–10)
Rank	Rider	Team	Time
1	Sergio Higuita (COL)	Bora–Hansgrohe	3h 59' 57"
2	Andrea Bagioli (ITA)	Soudal–Quick-Step	+ 0"
3	Mattias Skjelmose (DEN)	Trek–Segafredo	+ 0"
4	Matteo Sobrero (ITA)	Team Jayco–AlUla	+ 0"
5	Mauro Schmid (SUI)	Soudal–Quick-Step	+ 0"
6	Clément Champoussin (FRA)	Arkéa–Samsic	+ 0"
7	Ion Izagirre (ESP)	Cofidis	+ 0"
8	Felix Gall (AUT)	AG2R Citroën Team	+ 0"
9	Ruben Guerreiro (POR)	Movistar Team	+ 0"
10	Jonas Vingegaard (DEN)	Team Jumbo–Visma	+ 0"

General classification after Stage 5 (1–10)
Rank	Rider	Team	Time
1	Jonas Vingegaard (DEN)	Team Jumbo–Visma	21h 08' 52"
2	Mikel Landa (ESP)	Team Bahrain Victorious	+ 13"
3	Mattias Skjelmose (DEN)	Trek–Segafredo	+ 32"
4	David Gaudu (FRA)	Groupama–FDJ	+ 32"
5	Matteo Sobrero (ITA)	Team Jayco–AlUla	+ 34"
6	Ion Izagirre (ESP)	Cofidis	+ 34"
7	Enric Mas (ESP)	Movistar Team	+ 37"
8	Sergio Higuita (COL)	Bora–Hansgrohe	+ 38"
9	Brandon McNulty (USA)	UAE Team Emirates	+ 39"
10	Simon Yates (GBR)	Team Jayco–AlUla	+ 40"

=== Stage 6 ===
8 April 2023 — Eibar to Eibar, 137.8 km (85.6 mi)

Stage 6 Result (1–10)
Rank	Rider	Team	Time
1	Jonas Vingegaard (DEN)	Team Jumbo–Visma	3h 36' 42"
2	James Knox (GBR)	Soudal–Quick-Step	+ 49"
3	Ion Izagirre (ESP)	Cofidis	+ 49"
4	Brandon McNulty (USA)	UAE Team Emirates	+ 49"
5	Sergio Higuita (COL)	Bora–Hansgrohe	+ 49"
6	David Gaudu (FRA)	Groupama–FDJ	+ 49"
7	Mauro Schmid (SUI)	Soudal–Quick-Step	+ 49"
8	Simon Yates (GBR)	Team Jayco–AlUla	+ 49"
9	Felix Gall (AUT)	AG2R Citroën Team	+ 49"
10	Enric Mas (ESP)	Movistar Team	+ 49"

General classification after Stage 6 (1–10)
Rank	Rider	Team	Time
1	Jonas Vingegaard (DEN)	Team Jumbo–Visma	24h 45' 24"
2	Mikel Landa (ESP)	Team Bahrain Victorious	+ 1' 12"
3	Ion Izagirre (ESP)	Cofidis	+ 1' 29"
4	David Gaudu (FRA)	Groupama–FDJ	+ 1' 31"
5	Enric Mas (ESP)	Movistar Team	+ 1' 36"
6	Sergio Higuita (COL)	Bora–Hansgrohe	+ 1' 37"
7	Brandon McNulty (USA)	UAE Team Emirates	+ 1' 38"
8	James Knox (GBR)	Soudal–Quick-Step	+ 1' 38"
9	Simon Yates (GBR)	Team Jayco–AlUla	+ 1' 39"
10	Felix Gall (AUT)	AG2R Citroën Team	+ 1' 50"

== Classification leadership table ==
Classification leadership by stage
Stage	Winner	General classification	Points classification	Mountains classification	Young rider classification	Basque rider classification	Team classification	Combativity award
1	Ethan Hayter	Ethan Hayter	Ethan Hayter	Jon Barrenetxea	Ethan Hayter	Jon Aberasturi	Ineos Grenadiers	Txomin Juaristi
2	Ide Schelling	Ide Schelling	Alex Aranburu	Jon Barrenetxea	Ide Schelling	Mikel Landa	Movistar Team	Javier Romo
3	Jonas Vingegaard	Jonas Vingegaard	Alex Aranburu	Jon Barrenetxea	Mattias Skjelmose	Mikel Landa	Movistar Team	Rémi Cavagna
4	Jonas Vingegaard	Jonas Vingegaard	Jonas Vingegaard	Jon Barrenetxea	Mattias Skjelmose	Mikel Landa	Soudal–Quick-Step	Jon Barrenetxea
5	Sergio Higuita	Jonas Vingegaard	Jonas Vingegaard	Jon Barrenetxea	Mattias Skjelmose	Mikel Landa	Soudal–Quick-Step	Mattia Cattaneo
6	Jonas Vingegaard	Jonas Vingegaard	Jonas Vingegaard	Jon Barrenetxea	Brandon McNulty	Mikel Landa	Soudal–Quick-Step	Esteban Chaves
Final		Jonas Vingegaard	Jonas Vingegaard	Jon Barrenetxea	Brandon McNulty	Mikel Landa	Soudal Quick-Step	Not awarded

== Classification standings ==
Legend
Denotes the winner of the general classification	Denotes the winner of the young rider classification
Denotes the winner of the points classification	Denotes the winner of the team classification
Denotes the winner of the mountains classification	Denotes the winner of the combativity award

=== General classification ===
Final general classification (1–10)
Rank	Rider	Team	Time
1	Jonas Vingegaard (DEN)	Team Jumbo–Visma	24h 45' 24"
2	Mikel Landa (ESP)	Team Bahrain Victorious	+ 1' 12"
3	Ion Izagirre (ESP)	Cofidis	+ 1' 29"
4	David Gaudu (FRA)	Groupama–FDJ	+ 1' 31"
5	Enric Mas (ESP)	Movistar Team	+ 1' 36"
6	Sergio Higuita (COL)	Bora–Hansgrohe	+ 1' 37"
7	Brandon McNulty (USA)	UAE Team Emirates	+ 1' 38"
8	James Knox (GBR)	Soudal–Quick-Step	+ 1' 38"
9	Simon Yates (GBR)	Team Jayco–AlUla	+ 1' 39"
10	Felix Gall (AUT)	AG2R Citroën Team	+ 1' 50"

=== Points classification ===
Final points classification (1–10)
Rank	Rider	Team	Time
1	Jonas Vingegaard (DEN)	Team Jumbo–Visma	102
2	Mauro Schmid (SUI)	Soudal–Quick-Step	67
3	Mikel Landa (ESP)	Team Bahrain Victorious	55
4	Ion Izagirre (ESP)	Cofidis	51
5	Matteo Sobrero (ITA)	Team Jayco–AlUla	51
6	Mattias Skjelmose (DEN)	Trek–Segafredo	50
7	Brandon McNulty (USA)	UAE Team Emirates	48
8	David Gaudu (FRA)	Groupama–FDJ	47
9	Sergio Higuita (COL)	Bora–Hansgrohe	44
10	Alex Aranburu (ESP)	Movistar Team	34

=== Mountains classification ===
Final mountains classification (1–10)
Rank	Rider	Team	Time
1	Jon Barrenetxea (ESP)	Caja Rural–Seguros RGA	35
2	Esteban Chaves (COL)	EF Education–EasyPost	27
3	Ruben Guerreiro (POR)	Movistar Team	25
4	Jonas Vingegaard (DEN)	Team Jumbo–Visma	19
5	Steven Kruijswijk (NED)	Team Jumbo–Visma	18
6	Rémi Cavagna (FRA)	Soudal–Quick-Step	18
7	Mattia Cattaneo (ITA)	Soudal–Quick-Step	14
8	Alan Jousseaume (FRA)	Team TotalEnergies	11
9	Georg Zimmermann (GER)	Intermarché–Circus–Wanty	10
10	Mikel Landa (ESP)	Team Bahrain Victorious	8

=== Young rider classification ===
Final young rider classification (1–10)
Rank	Rider	Team	Time
1	Brandon McNulty (USA)	UAE Team Emirates	24h 47' 02"
2	Felix Gall (AUT)	AG2R Citroën Team	+ 12"
3	Mauro Schmid (SUI)	Soudal–Quick-Step	+ 58"
4	Attila Valter (HUN)	Team Jumbo–Visma	+ 1' 35"
5	Mattias Skjelmose (DEN)	Trek–Segafredo	+ 3' 05"
6	Andreas Leknessund (NOR)	Team DSM	+ 6' 06"
7	Igor Arrieta (ESP)	Equipo Kern Pharma	+ 6' 20"
8	Marc Hirschi (SUI)	UAE Team Emirates	+ 14' 42"
9	Laurens Huys (BEL)	Intermarché–Circus–Wanty	+ 18' 04"
10	Romain Grégoire (FRA)	Groupama–FDJ	+ 32' 33"

=== Basque rider classification ===
Final Basque rider classification (1–10)
Rank	Rider	Team	Time
1	Mikel Landa (ESP)	Team Bahrain Victorious	24h 46' 36"
2	Ion Izagirre (ESP)	Cofidis	+ 17"
3	Víctor de la Parte (ESP)	Team TotalEnergies	+ 4' 46"
4	Mikel Bizkarra (ESP)	Euskaltel–Euskadi	+ 4' 59"
5	Igor Arrieta (ESP)	Equipo Kern Pharma	+ 6' 46"
6	Jonathan Lastra (ESP)	Cofidis	+ 14' 24"
7	Alex Aranburu (ESP)	Movistar Team	+ 14' 28"
8	Gorka Izagirre (ESP)	Movistar Team	+ 17' 13"
9	Gorzon Martín (ESP)	Euskaltel–Euskadi	+ 24' 03"
10	Jonathan Castroviejo (ESP)	Ineos Grenadiers	+ 26' 18"

=== Team classification ===
Final team classification (1–10)
Rank	Team	Time
1	(Belgium) Soudal–Quick-Step	74h 24' 59"
2	(Netherlands) Team Jumbo–Visma	+ 3' 29"
3	(Spain) Movistar Team	+ 5' 58"
4	(Germany) Bora–Hansgrohe	+ 14' 43"
5	(United States) EF Education–EasyPost	+ 15' 19"
6	(France) Arkéa–Samsic	+ 17' 21"
7	(Australia) Team Jayco–AlUla	+ 20' 16"
8	(United States) Trek–Segafredo	+ 20' 37"
9	(France) Groupama–FDJ	+ 21' 52"
10	(France) Cofidis	+ 32' 46"
