= 2025 Euskaltel–Euskadi season =

Euskaltel–Euskadi
- 2025 season
- UCI code: EUS
- Status: UCI ProTeam
- Manager: (Spain) Aitor Galdós
- Based: Spain
- Bicycles: Mendiz

Season victories
- Stage race stages: 1
- Most wins: (France) Paul Hennequin (1)

The 2025 season for the Euskaltel–Euskadi team is the team's 8th season in existence, and its 6th season as a UCI ProTeam.

== Team roster ==
All ages are as of 1 January 2025, the first day of the 2025 season.

As of 21 March 2025.

Rider	Date of birth
Jon Aberasturi (ESP)	28 March 1989 (aged 35)
Jon Agirre (ESP)	10 September 1997 (aged 27)
Nicolás Alustiza (ESP)	4 January 2003 (aged 21)
Xabier Berasategi (ESP)	4 August 2000 (aged 24)
Mikel Bizkarra (ESP)	21 August 1989 (aged 35)
Iker Bonillo (ESP)	9 July 2003 (aged 21)
Víctor de la Parte (ESP)	22 June 1986 (aged 38)
David Dekker (NED)	2 February 1998 (aged 26)
Márton Dina (HUN)	11 April 1996 (aged 28)
Ander Ganzábal (ESP)	25 January 2000 (aged 24)
Paul Hennequin (FRA)	9 December 2002 (aged 22)

Rider	Date of birth
Xabier Isasa (ESP)	24 August 2001 (aged 23)
Txomin Juaristi (ESP)	20 July 1995 (aged 29)
Andoni López de Abetxuko (ESP)	3 August 1999 (aged 25)
Jordi López (ESP)	14 August 1998 (aged 26)
Gotzon Martín (ESP)	15 February 1996 (aged 28)
Iker Mintegui (ESP)	15 November 2002 (aged 22)
Jokin Murguialday (ESP)	19 March 2000 (aged 24)
Louis Sutton (GBR)	27 May 2002 (aged 22)
Danny van der Tuuk (POL)	5 November 1999 (aged 25)
Unai Zubeldia (ESP)	7 July 2003 (aged 21)

== Season victories ==
Date	Race	Competition	Rider	Country	Location	Ref.
20 March	Tour de Taiwan, stage 5	UCI Asia Tour	Paul Hennequin (FRA)	Taiwan	Liudui Hakka Cultural Park	
