= 2025 Vuelta a Andalucía =

Spanish cycling race

2025 UCI ProSeries

Race details
- Dates: 19–23 February 2025
- Stages: 5
- Distance: 820.3 km (509.7 mi)
- Winning time: 19h 41' 03"

Results
Jersey awarded to the overall winner	Winner	Pavel Sivakov (FRA)	(UAE Team Emirates XRG)
	Second	Clément Berthet (FRA)	(Decathlon–AG2R La Mondiale)
	Third	Tom Pidcock (GBR)	(Q36.5 Pro Cycling Team)
Jersey awarded to the points classification winner	Points	Maxim Van Gils (BEL)	(Red Bull–Bora–Hansgrohe)
Jersey awarded to the mountains classification winner	Mountains	Guillermo Thomas Silva (URU)	(Caja Rural–Seguros RGA)
	Combination	Pavel Sivakov (FRA)	(UAE Team Emirates XRG)
Jersey awarded to the sprints classification winner	Sprints	Andreas Leknessund (NOR)	(Uno-X Mobility)
	Team	(France) Decathlon–AG2R La Mondiale	

The 2025 Vuelta a Andalucía Ruta del Sol (English: Tour of Andalucia Route of the Sun) was a road cycling stage race that took place between 19 and 23 February 2025 in the autonomous community of Andalusia in southern Spain. The race was rated as a category 2.Pro event on the 2025 UCI ProSeries calendar, and was the 71st edition of the Vuelta a Andalucía.

== Teams ==
Six UCI WorldTeams ten, UCI ProTeams, and one UCI Continental team made up the seventeen teams that participated in the race..

UCI WorldTeams

- Decathlon–AG2R La Mondiale
- Ineos Grenadiers
- Movistar Team
- Red Bull–Bora–Hansgrohe
- Team Jayco–AlUla
- UAE Team Emirates XRG

UCI ProTeams

- Burgos Burpellet BH
- Caja Rural–Seguros RGA
- Equipo Kern Pharma
- Euskaltel–Euskadi
- Q36.5 Pro Cycling Team
- Team Flanders–Baloise
- Team TotalEnergies
- Unibet Tietema Rockets
- Uno-X Mobility
- Wagner Bazin WB

UCI Continental Teams

- Petrolike

== Route ==
Stage characteristics and winners
Stage	Date	Course	Distance	Type	Stage winner
1	19 February	Torrox to Cueva de Nerja	162.6 km (101.0 mi)	Hilly stage	Maxim Van Gils (BEL)
2	20 February	Alcaudete to Torredelcampo	133.2 km (82.8 mi)	Hilly stage	Tom Pidcock (GBR)
3	21 February	Arjona to Pozoblanco	162.1 km (100.7 mi)	Hilly stage	Alexander Kristoff (NOR)
4	22 February	Córdoba to Alhaurín de la Torre	194.3 km (120.7 mi)	Hilly stage	Diego Uriarte (ESP)
5	23 February	Benahavís to La Línea de la Concepción	168.1 km (104.5 mi)	Mountain stage	Jon Barrenetxea (ESP)
Total			820.3 km (509.7 mi)		

== Stages ==
=== Stage 1 ===
19 February 2025 – Torrox to Cueva de Nerja, 162.6 km (101.0 mi)

Stage 1 Result
Rank	Rider	Team	Time
1	Maxim Van Gils (BEL)	Red Bull–Bora–Hansgrohe	4h 19' 23"
2	Tim Wellens (BEL)	UAE Team Emirates XRG	+ 0"
3	Pavel Sivakov (FRA)	UAE Team Emirates XRG	+ 7"
4	Marc Soler (ESP)	UAE Team Emirates XRG	+ 30"
5	Clément Berthet (FRA)	Decathlon–AG2R La Mondiale	+ 30"
6	Andreas Leknessund (NOR)	Uno-X Mobility	+ 33"
7	Steff Cras (BEL)	Team TotalEnergies	+ 39"
8	Tom Pidcock (GBR)	Q36.5 Pro Cycling Team	+ 39"
9	Igor Arrieta (ESP)	UAE Team Emirates XRG	+ 1' 38"
10	Thomas Gachignard (FRA)	Team TotalEnergies	+ 1' 40"

General classification after Stage 1
Rank	Rider	Team	Time
1	Maxim Van Gils (BEL)	Red Bull–Bora–Hansgrohe	4h 19' 23"
2	Tim Wellens (BEL)	UAE Team Emirates XRG	+ 0"
3	Pavel Sivakov (FRA)	UAE Team Emirates XRG	+ 7"
4	Marc Soler (ESP)	UAE Team Emirates XRG	+ 30"
5	Clément Berthet (FRA)	Decathlon–AG2R La Mondiale	+ 30"
6	Andreas Leknessund (NOR)	Uno-X Mobility	+ 33"
7	Steff Cras (BEL)	Team TotalEnergies	+ 39"
8	Tom Pidcock (GBR)	Q36.5 Pro Cycling Team	+ 39"
9	Igor Arrieta (ESP)	UAE Team Emirates XRG	+ 1' 38"
10	Thomas Gachignard (FRA)	Team TotalEnergies	+ 1' 40"

=== Stage 2 ===
20 February 2025 – Alcaudete to Torredelcampo, 133.2 km (82.8 mi)

Stage 2 Result
Rank	Rider	Team	Time
1	Tom Pidcock (GBR)	Q36.5 Pro Cycling Team	3h 22' 04"
2	Brandon Rivera (COL)	Ineos Grenadiers	+ 0"
3	Pavel Sivakov (FRA)	UAE Team Emirates XRG	+ 0"
4	Clément Berthet (FRA)	Decathlon–AG2R La Mondiale	+ 0"
5	Enric Mas (ESP)	Movistar Team	+ 0"
6	Maxim Van Gils (BEL)	Red Bull–Bora–Hansgrohe	+ 1' 10"
7	Markus Hoelgaard (NOR)	Uno-X Mobility	+ 1' 10"
8	Tim Wellens (BEL)	UAE Team Emirates XRG	+ 1' 10"
9	Ruben Guerreiro (POR)	Movistar Team	+ 1' 10"
10	José Manuel Díaz (ESP)	Burgos Burpellet BH	+ 1' 10"

General classification after Stage 2
Rank	Rider	Team	Time
1	Pavel Sivakov (FRA)	UAE Team Emirates XRG	7h 41' 34"
2	Clément Berthet (FRA)	Decathlon–AG2R La Mondiale	+ 23"
3	Tom Pidcock (GBR)	Q36.5 Pro Cycling Team	+ 32"
4	Maxim Van Gils (BEL)	Red Bull–Bora–Hansgrohe	+ 1' 03"
5	Tim Wellens (BEL)	UAE Team Emirates XRG	+ 1' 03"
6	Marc Soler (ESP)	UAE Team Emirates XRG	+ 1' 38"
7	Steff Cras (BEL)	Team TotalEnergies	+ 1' 42"
8	Johannes Staune-Mittet (NOR)	Decathlon–AG2R La Mondiale	+ 2' 43"
9	Markus Hoelgaard (NOR)	Uno-X Mobility	+ 2' 46"
10	Nicolas Prodhomme (FRA)	Decathlon–AG2R La Mondiale	+ 3' 02"

=== Stage 3 ===
21 February 2025 – Arjona to Pozoblanco, 162.1 km (100.7 mi)

Stage 3 Result
Rank	Rider	Team	Time
1	Alexander Kristoff (NOR)	Uno-X Mobility	3h 51' 32"
2	Ben Turner (GBR)	Ineos Grenadiers	+ 0"
3	Maxim Van Gils (BEL)	Red Bull–Bora–Hansgrohe	+ 0"
4	Tom Pidcock (GBR)	Q36.5 Pro Cycling Team	+ 0"
5	Oliver Naesen (BEL)	Decathlon–AG2R La Mondiale	+ 0"
6	Cesar Macias (MEX)	Petrolike	+ 0"
7	Florian Dauphin (FRA)	Team TotalEnergies	+ 0"
8	Anders Foldager (DEN)	Team Jayco–AlUla	+ 0"
9	Jon Barrenetxea (ESP)	Movistar Team	+ 0"
10	David Martín (ESP)	Burgos Burpellet BH	+ 0"

General classification after Stage 3
Rank	Rider	Team	Time
1	Pavel Sivakov (FRA)	UAE Team Emirates XRG	11h 33' 06"
2	Clément Berthet (FRA)	Decathlon–AG2R La Mondiale	+ 23"
3	Tom Pidcock (GBR)	Q36.5 Pro Cycling Team	+ 26"
4	Maxim Van Gils (BEL)	Red Bull–Bora–Hansgrohe	+ 59"
5	Tim Wellens (BEL)	UAE Team Emirates XRG	+ 1' 03"
6	Marc Soler (ESP)	UAE Team Emirates XRG	+ 1' 35"
7	Steff Cras (BEL)	Team TotalEnergies	+ 1' 42"
8	Markus Hoelgaard (NOR)	Uno-X Mobility	+ 2' 41"
9	Johannes Staune-Mittet (NOR)	Decathlon–AG2R La Mondiale	+ 2' 43"
10	Nicolas Prodhomme (FRA)	Decathlon–AG2R La Mondiale	+ 3' 02"

=== Stage 4 ===
22 February 2025 – Córdoba to Alhaurín de la Torre, 194.3 km (120.7 mi)

Stage 4 Result
Rank	Rider	Team	Time
1	Diego Uriarte (ESP)	Equipo Kern Pharma	4h 07' 21"
2	Alan Jousseaume (FRA)	Team TotalEnergies	+ 9"
3	Connor Swift (GBR)	Ineos Grenadiers	+ 9"
4	Callum Scotson (AUS)	Decathlon–AG2R La Mondiale	+ 9"
5	Sebastian Berwick (AUS)	Caja Rural–Seguros RGA	+ 9"
6	Danny van der Tuuk (POL)	Euskaltel–Euskadi	+ 16"
7	Welay Berhe (ETH)	Team Jayco–AlUla	+ 21"
8	Anders Halland Johannessen (NOR)	Uno-X Mobility	+ 21"
9	Emīls Liepiņš (LAT)	Q36.5 Pro Cycling Team	+ 21"
10	Jorge Arcas (ESP)	Movistar Team	+ 26"

General classification after Stage 4
Rank	Rider	Team	Time
1	Pavel Sivakov (FRA)	UAE Team Emirates XRG	15h 44' 59"
2	Clément Berthet (FRA)	Decathlon–AG2R La Mondiale	+ 23"
3	Tom Pidcock (GBR)	Q36.5 Pro Cycling Team	+ 26"
4	Maxim Van Gils (BEL)	Red Bull–Bora–Hansgrohe	+ 59"
5	Tim Wellens (BEL)	UAE Team Emirates XRG	+ 1' 03"
6	Marc Soler (ESP)	UAE Team Emirates XRG	+ 1' 35"
7	Steff Cras (BEL)	Team TotalEnergies	+ 1' 42"
8	Markus Hoelgaard (NOR)	Uno-X Mobility	+ 2' 41"
9	Johannes Staune-Mittet (NOR)	Decathlon–AG2R La Mondiale	+ 2' 43"
10	Nicolas Prodhomme (FRA)	Decathlon–AG2R La Mondiale	+ 3' 02"

=== Stage 5 ===
23 February 2025 – Córdoba to Alhaurín de la Torre, 168.1 km (104.5 mi)

Stage 5 Result
Rank	Rider	Team	Time
1	Jon Barrenetxea (ESP)	Movistar Team	3h 55' 33"
2	Tobias Halland Johannessen (NOR)	Uno-X Mobility	+ 0"
3	Johannes Staune-Mittet (NOR)	Decathlon–AG2R La Mondiale	+ 2"
4	Giovanni Carboni (ITA)	Unibet Tietema Rockets	+ 12"
5	Thomas Gachignard (FRA)	Team TotalEnergies	+ 18"
6	Maxim Van Gils (BEL)	Red Bull–Bora–Hansgrohe	+ 31"
7	Ben Turner (GBR)	Ineos Grenadiers	+ 31"
8	Anders Foldager (DEN)	Team Jayco–AlUla	+ 31"
9	Oliver Naesen (BEL)	Decathlon–AG2R La Mondiale	+ 31"
10	Tom Pidcock (GBR)	Q36.5 Pro Cycling Team	+ 31"

General classification after Stage 5
Rank	Rider	Team	Time
1	Pavel Sivakov (FRA)	UAE Team Emirates XRG	19h 41' 03"
2	Clément Berthet (FRA)	Decathlon–AG2R La Mondiale	+ 23"
3	Tom Pidcock (GBR)	Q36.5 Pro Cycling Team	+ 26"
4	Maxim Van Gils (BEL)	Red Bull–Bora–Hansgrohe	+ 59"
5	Tim Wellens (BEL)	UAE Team Emirates XRG	+ 1' 03"
6	Steff Cras (BEL)	Team TotalEnergies	+ 1' 42"
7	Marc Soler (ESP)	UAE Team Emirates XRG	+ 1' 43"
8	Johannes Staune-Mittet (NOR)	Decathlon–AG2R La Mondiale	+ 2' 14"
9	Markus Hoelgaard (NOR)	Uno-X Mobility	+ 2' 41"
10	Nicolas Prodhomme (FRA)	Decathlon–AG2R La Mondiale	+ 3' 02"

== Classification leadership table ==
Classification leadership by stage
Stage	Winner	General classification	Points classification	Mountains classification	Sprints classification	Andalusian rider classification	Spanish rider classification	Combination classification	Team classification
1	Maxim Van Gils	Maxim Van Gils	Maxim Van Gils	Guillermo Thomas Silva	Andreas Leknessund	José Manuel Díaz	Marc Soler	Maxim Van Gils	UAE Team Emirates XRG
2	Tom Pidcock	Pavel Sivakov	Maxim Van Gils	Guillermo Thomas Silva	Andreas Leknessund	José Manuel Díaz	Marc Soler	Pavel Sivakov	UAE Team Emirates XRG
3	Alexander Kristoff	Pavel Sivakov	Maxim Van Gils	Guillermo Thomas Silva	Andreas Leknessund	José Manuel Díaz	Marc Soler	Pavel Sivakov	UAE Team Emirates XRG
4	Diego Uriarte	Pavel Sivakov	Maxim Van Gils	Guillermo Thomas Silva	Andreas Leknessund	José Manuel Díaz	Marc Soler	Pavel Sivakov	Decathlon–AG2R La Mondiale
5	Jon Barrenetxea	Pavel Sivakov	Maxim Van Gils	Guillermo Thomas Silva	Andreas Leknessund	José Manuel Díaz	Marc Soler	Pavel Sivakov	Decathlon–AG2R La Mondiale
Final		Pavel Sivakov	Maxim Van Gils	Guillermo Thomas Silva	Andreas Leknessund	José Manuel Díaz	Marc Soler	Pavel Sivakov	Decathlon–AG2R La Mondiale

== Classification standings ==
Legend
Denotes the winner of the general classification	Denotes the winner of the sprints classification
Denotes the winner of the points classification	Denotes the winner of the Andalusian rider classification
Denotes the winner of the mountains classification	Denotes the winner of the Spanish rider classification

=== General classification ===
Final general classification (1–10)
Rank	Rider	Team	Time
1	Pavel Sivakov (FRA)	UAE Team Emirates XRG	19h 41' 03"
2	Clément Berthet (FRA)	Decathlon–AG2R La Mondiale	+ 23"
3	Tom Pidcock (GBR)	Q36.5 Pro Cycling Team	+ 26"
4	Maxim Van Gils (BEL)	Red Bull–Bora–Hansgrohe	+ 59"
5	Tim Wellens (BEL)	UAE Team Emirates XRG	+ 1' 03"
6	Steff Cras (BEL)	Team TotalEnergies	+ 1' 42"
7	Marc Soler (ESP)	UAE Team Emirates XRG	+ 1' 43"
8	Johannes Staune-Mittet (NOR)	Decathlon–AG2R La Mondiale	+ 2' 14"
9	Markus Hoelgaard (NOR)	Uno-X Mobility	+ 2' 41"
10	Nicolas Prodhomme (FRA)	Decathlon–AG2R La Mondiale	+ 3' 02"

=== Points classification ===
Final points classification (1–10)
Rank	Rider	Team	Time
1	Maxim Van Gils (BEL)	Red Bull–Bora–Hansgrohe	62
2	Tom Pidcock (GBR)	Q36.5 Pro Cycling Team	53
3	Jon Barrenetxea (ESP)	Movistar Team	32
4	Pavel Sivakov (FRA)	UAE Team Emirates XRG	32
5	Tim Wellens (BEL)	UAE Team Emirates XRG	31
6	Ben Turner (GBR)	Ineos Grenadiers	29
7	Clément Berthet (FRA)	Decathlon–AG2R La Mondiale	26
8	Diego Uriarte (ESP)	Equipo Kern Pharma	25
9	Johannes Staune-Mittet (NOR)	Decathlon–AG2R La Mondiale	25
10	Tobias Halland Johannessen (NOR)	Uno-X Mobility	21

=== Mountains classification ===
Final mountains classification (1–10)
Rank	Rider	Team	Time
1	Guillermo Thomas Silva (URU)	Caja Rural–Seguros RGA	22
2	Alan Jousseaume (FRA)	Team TotalEnergies	10
3	Thomas Gachignard (FRA)	Team TotalEnergies	8
4	Pavel Sivakov (FRA)	UAE Team Emirates XRG	7
5	Andreas Leknessund (NOR)	Uno-X Mobility	7
6	Marc Soler (ESP)	UAE Team Emirates XRG	6
7	Gianluca Brambilla (ITA)	Q36.5 Pro Cycling Team	6
8	Paul Double (GBR)	Team Jayco–AlUla	6
9	Ander Okamika (ESP)	Burgos Burpellet BH	6
10	Enric Mas (ESP)	Movistar Team	4

=== Sprints classification ===
Final sprints classification (1–10)
Rank	Rider	Team	Time
1	Andreas Leknessund (NOR)	Uno-X Mobility	6
2	Guillermo Thomas Silva (URU)	Caja Rural–Seguros RGA	3
3	Diego Uriarte (ESP)	Equipo Kern Pharma	3
4	Pavel Sivakov (FRA)	UAE Team Emirates XRG	2
5	Tobias Halland Johannessen (NOR)	Uno-X Mobility	2
6	Axel Laurance (FRA)	Ineos Grenadiers	2
7	Nicolas Prodhomme (FRA)	Decathlon–AG2R La Mondiale	1
8	Connor Swift (GBR)	Ineos Grenadiers	1
9	Jordan Labrosse (FRA)	Decathlon–AG2R La Mondiale	1
10	Jaume Guardeño (ESP)	Caja Rural–Seguros RGA	1

=== Teams classification ===
Final team classification (1–10)
Rank	Team	Time
1	(France) Decathlon–AG2R La Mondiale	59h 04' 22"
2	(United Arab Emirates) UAE Team Emirates XRG	+ 1' 36"
3	(Norway) Uno-X Mobility	+ 12' 59"
4	(Spain) Movistar Team	+ 21' 58"
5	(United Kingdom) Ineos Grenadiers	+ 30' 03"
6	(France) Team TotalEnergies	+ 30' 47"
7	(Switzerland) Q36.5 Pro Cycling Team	+ 36' 50"
8	(Germany) Red Bull–Bora–Hansgrohe	+ 39' 14"
9	(Spain) Burgos Burpellet BH	+ 41' 06"
10	(Spain) Equipo Kern Pharma	+ 46' 26"
