= 2025 Vuelta a Asturias =

Spanish cycling race

2025 Vuelta Asturias
2025 UCI Europe Tour

Race details
- Dates: 24–27 April 2025
- Stages: 4
- Distance: 609.3 km (378.6 mi)
- Winning time: 15h 10' 23"

Results
Jersey awarded to the overall winner	Winner	Marc Soler (ESP)	(UAE Team Emirates XRG)
	Second	Txomin Juaristi (ESP)	(Euskaltel–Euskadi)
	Third	Alexis Guérin (FRA)	(Anicolor / Tien 21)
Jersey awarded to the points classification winner	Points	Marc Soler (ESP)	(UAE Team Emirates XRG)
Jersey awarded to the mountains classification winner	Mountains	Marc Soler (ESP)	(UAE Team Emirates XRG)
Jersey awarded to the sprints classification winner	Sprints	Jan Sommer (SUI)	(MYVELO Pro Cycling Team)
Jersey awarded to the team classification winner	Team	UAE Team Emirates XRG	

The 2025 Vuelta Asturias Julio Alvarez Mendo was a road cycling stage race that took place between 24 and 27 April 2025 in the Asturias region of northwestern Spain. It was the 67th edition of the Vuelta a Asturias and was part of the 2025 UCI Europe Tour calendar as a category 2.1 event.

== Teams ==
Two UCI WorldTeams, five UCI ProTeams, seven UCI Continental, and the Spanish national team made up the fifteen teams that participated in the race. There were a total of 104 riders that started the race.

=== UCI WorldTeams ===
- Movistar Team
- UAE Team Emirates XRG

=== UCI ProTeams ===
- Burgos Burpellet BH
- Caja Rural–Seguros RGA
- Equipo Kern Pharma
- Euskaltel–Euskadi
- Team TotalEnergies

=== UCI Continental Teams ===
- Anicolor / Tien 21
- EuroCyclingTrips–CCN
- Illes Balears Arabay
- MENtoRISE Teem CCN
- MYVELO Pro Cycling Team
- Victoria Sports Pro Cycling
- X-Speed United Continental Team

=== National teams ===
- Spain

== Route ==
Stage characteristics and winners
Stage	Date	Route	Distance	Type	Winner
1	24 April	Oviedo to Llanes	163.9 km (101.8 mi)	Mountain stage	Steff Cras (BEL)
2	25 April	Benia de Onís to Pola de Lena	144.3 km (89.7 mi)	Mountain stage	Iván García Cortina (ESP)
3	26 April	Castropol to Vegadeo	165.5 km (102.8 mi)	Mountain stage	Alessandro Covi (ITA)
4	27 April	Navia to Oviedo	135.6 km (84.3 mi)	Hilly stage	Marc Soler (ESP)
Total			609.3 km (378.6 mi)		

== Stages ==
=== Stage 1 ===
24 April 2025 – Oviedo to Llanes, 163.9 km (101.8 mi)

Stage 1 Result
Rank	Rider	Team	Time
1	Steff Cras (BEL)	Team TotalEnergies	4h 01' 53"
2	Marc Soler (ESP)	UAE Team Emirates XRG	+ 0"
3	Alessandro Covi (ITA)	UAE Team Emirates XRG	+ 1' 01"
4	Sergio Chumil (GUA)	Burgos Burpellet BH	+ 1' 01"
5	Alex Molenaar (NED)	Caja Rural–Seguros RGA	+ 1' 01"
6	Joris Delbove (FRA)	Team TotalEnergies	+ 1' 01"
7	Fernando Barceló (ESP)	Caja Rural–Seguros RGA	+ 1' 01"
8	Pau Martí (ESP)	Spain	+ 1' 01"
9	Iván Cobo (ESP)	Equipo Kern Pharma	+ 1' 01"
10	Antonio Pedrero (ESP)	Movistar Team	+ 1' 01"

General classification after Stage 1
Rank	Rider	Team	Time
1	Steff Cras (BEL)	Team TotalEnergies	4h 01' 53"
2	Marc Soler (ESP)	UAE Team Emirates XRG	+ 0"
3	Alessandro Covi (ITA)	UAE Team Emirates XRG	+ 1' 01"
4	Sergio Chumil (GUA)	Burgos Burpellet BH	+ 1' 01"
5	Alex Molenaar (NED)	Caja Rural–Seguros RGA	+ 1' 01"
6	Joris Delbove (FRA)	Team TotalEnergies	+ 1' 01"
7	Fernando Barceló (ESP)	Caja Rural–Seguros RGA	+ 1' 01"
8	Pau Martí (ESP)	Spain	+ 1' 01"
9	Iván Cobo (ESP)	Equipo Kern Pharma	+ 1' 01"
10	Antonio Pedrero (ESP)	Movistar Team	+ 1' 01"

=== Stage 2 ===
25 April 2025 – Benia de Onís to Pola de Lena, 144.3 km (89.7 mi)

Stage 2 Result
Rank	Rider	Team	Time
1	Iván García Cortina (ESP)	Movistar Team	3h 48' 33"
2	Julius Johansen (DEN)	UAE Team Emirates XRG	+ 1"
3	Marc Soler (ESP)	UAE Team Emirates XRG	+ 41"
4	Hugo de la Calle (ESP)	Burgos Burpellet BH	+ 1' 21"
5	Samuel Fernández (ESP)	Caja Rural–Seguros RGA	+ 1' 23"
6	António Morgado (POR)	UAE Team Emirates XRG	+ 2' 42"
7	Adrià Pericas (ESP)	UAE Team Emirates XRG	+ 2' 42"
8	Txomin Juaristi (ESP)	Euskaltel–Euskadi	+ 2' 42"
9	Diego Pescador (COL)	Movistar Team	+ 3' 23"
10	Alexis Guérin (FRA)	Anicolor / Tien 21	+ 3' 23"

General classification after Stage 2
Rank	Rider	Team	Time
1	Marc Soler (ESP)	UAE Team Emirates XRG	7h 50' 57"
2	Hugo de la Calle (ESP)	Burgos Burpellet BH	+ 1' 51"
3	Samuel Fernández (ESP)	Caja Rural–Seguros RGA	+ 1' 53"
4	Adrià Pericas (ESP)	UAE Team Emirates XRG	+ 3' 12"
5	Txomin Juaristi (ESP)	Euskaltel–Euskadi	+ 3' 12"
6	Alexis Guérin (FRA)	Anicolor / Tien 21	+ 3' 53"
7	Diego Pescador (COL)	Movistar Team	+ 3' 53"
8	Fernando Barceló (ESP)	Caja Rural–Seguros RGA	+ 4' 00"
9	Joris Delbove (FRA)	Team TotalEnergies	+ 4' 00"
10	José Manuel Díaz (ESP)	Burgos Burpellet BH	+ 4' 00"

=== Stage 3 ===
26 April – Castropol to Vegadeo, 165.5 km (102.8 mi)

Stage 3 Result
Rank	Rider	Team	Time
1	Alessandro Covi (ITA)	UAE Team Emirates XRG	4h 04' 57"
2	Jordi López (ESP)	Euskaltel–Euskadi	+ 0"
3	Iván García Cortina (ESP)	Movistar Team	+ 0"
4	Jason Tesson (FRA)	Team TotalEnergies	+ 0"
5	Mats Wenzel (LUX)	Equipo Kern Pharma	+ 0"
6	Iker Bonillo (ESP)	Euskaltel–Euskadi	+ 0"
7	Antonio Angulo (ESP)	Burgos Burpellet BH	+ 0"
8	Sergio Trueba (ESP)	Illes Balears Arabay	+ 0"
9	Fernando Barceló (ESP)	Caja Rural–Seguros RGA	+ 0"
10	Alex Molenaar (NED)	Caja Rural–Seguros RGA	+ 0"

Final general classification
Rank	Rider	Team	Time
1	Marc Soler (ESP)	UAE Team Emirates XRG	11h 55' 54"
2	Hugo de la Calle (ESP)	Burgos Burpellet BH	+ 1' 51"
3	Samuel Fernández (ESP)	Caja Rural–Seguros RGA	+ 1' 53"
4	Adrià Pericas (ESP)	UAE Team Emirates XRG	+ 3' 12"
5	Txomin Juaristi (ESP)	Euskaltel–Euskadi	+ 3' 12"
6	Alexis Guérin (FRA)	Anicolor / Tien 21	+ 3' 53"
7	Diego Pescador (COL)	Movistar Team	+ 3' 53"
8	Fernando Barceló (ESP)	Caja Rural–Seguros RGA	+ 4' 00"
9	Joris Delbove (FRA)	Team TotalEnergies	+ 4' 00"
10	José Manuel Díaz (ESP)	Burgos Burpellet BH	+ 4' 00"

=== Stage 4 ===
27 April – Navia to Oviedo, 135.6 km (84.3 mi)

Stage 4 Result
Rank	Rider	Team	Time
1	Marc Soler (ESP)	UAE Team Emirates XRG	3h 14' 39"
2	Mattéo Vercher (FRA)	Team TotalEnergies	+ 3"
3	Alexis Guérin (FRA)	Anicolor / Tien 21	+ 16"
4	Txomin Juaristi (ESP)	Euskaltel–Euskadi	+ 16"
5	Fernando Barceló (ESP)	Caja Rural–Seguros RGA	+ 1' 16"
6	Diego Pescador (COL)	Movistar Team	+ 1' 16"
7	Unai Iribar (ESP)	Equipo Kern Pharma	+ 1' 16"
8	Joris Delbove (FRA)	Team TotalEnergies	+ 1 16"
9	Alan Jousseaume (FRA)	Team TotalEnergies	+ 1' 16"
10	José Félix Parra (ESP)	Equipo Kern Pharma	+ 1' 16"

Final general classification
Rank	Rider	Team	Time
1	Marc Soler (ESP)	UAE Team Emirates XRG	15h 10' 23"
2	Txomin Juaristi (ESP)	Euskaltel–Euskadi	+ 3' 37"
3	Alexis Guérin (FRA)	Anicolor / Tien 21	+ 4' 15"
4	Hugo de la Calle (ESP)	Burgos Burpellet BH	+ 4' 27"
5	Samuel Fernández (ESP)	Caja Rural–Seguros RGA	+ 4' 51"
6	Diego Pescador (COL)	Movistar Team	+ 5' 16"
7	Fernando Barceló (ESP)	Caja Rural–Seguros RGA	+ 5' 20"
8	Joris Delbove (FRA)	Team TotalEnergies	+ 5' 24"
9	José Manuel Díaz (ESP)	Burgos Burpellet BH	+ 5' 26"
10	Jan Castellon (ESP)	Caja Rural–Seguros RGA	+ 5' 29"

== Classification leadership table ==
Classification leadership by stage
Stage	Winner	General classification	Points classification	Mountains classification	Young rider classification	Intermediate sprint classification	Team classification
1	Steff Cras	Steff Cras	Steff Cras	Steff Cras	Pau Martí	Sergio Trueba	UAE Team Emirates XRG
2	Iván García Cortina	Marc Soler	Marc Soler	Iván García Cortina	Hugo de la Calle	Jan Sommer	UAE Team Emirates XRG
3	Alessandro Covi	Marc Soler	Iván García Cortina	Iván García Cortina	Hugo de la Calle	Jan Sommer	UAE Team Emirates XRG
4	Marc Soler	Marc Soler	Marc Soler	Marc Soler	Hugo de la Calle	Jan Sommer	UAE Team Emirates XRG
Final		Marc Soler	Marc Soler	Marc Soler	Hugo de la Calle	Jan Sommer	UAE Team Emirates

== Classification standings ==
Legend
Denotes the leader of the General classification	Denotes the leader of the Mountains classification
Denotes the leader of the Points classification	Denotes the leader of the Intermediate sprints classification

=== General classification ===
Final general classification (1–10)
Rank	Rider	Team	Time
1	Marc Soler (ESP)	UAE Team Emirates XRG	15h 10' 23"
2	Txomin Juaristi (ESP)	Euskaltel–Euskadi	+ 3' 37"
3	Alexis Guérin (FRA)	Anicolor / Tien 21	+ 4' 15"
4	Hugo de la Calle (ESP)	Burgos Burpellet BH	+ 4' 27"
5	Samuel Fernández (ESP)	Caja Rural–Seguros RGA	+ 4' 51"
6	Diego Pescador (COL)	Movistar Team	+ 5' 16"
7	Fernando Barceló (ESP)	Caja Rural–Seguros RGA	+ 5' 20"
8	Joris Delbove (FRA)	Team TotalEnergies	+ 5' 24"
9	José Manuel Díaz (ESP)	Burgos Burpellet BH	+ 5' 26"
10	Jan Castellon (ESP)	Caja Rural–Seguros RGA	+ 5' 29"

=== Points classification ===
Final points classification (1–10)
Rank	Rider	Team	Points
1	Marc Soler (ESP)	UAE Team Emirates XRG	61
2	Alessandro Covi (ITA)	UAE Team Emirates XRG	41
3	Iván García Cortina (ESP)	Movistar Team	41
4	Fernando Barceló (ESP)	Caja Rural–Seguros RGA	33
5	Txomin Juaristi (ESP)	Euskaltel–Euskadi	22
6	Alexis Guérin (FRA)	Anicolor / Tien 21	22
7	Joris Delbove (FRA)	Team TotalEnergies	22
8	Julius Johansen (DEN)	UAE Team Emirates XRG	20
9	Jordi López (ESP)	Euskaltel–Euskadi	20
10	Mattéo Vercher (FRA)	Team TotalEnergies	20

=== Mountains classification ===
Final mountains classification (1–10)
Rank	Rider	Team	Points
1	Marc Soler (ESP)	UAE Team Emirates XRG	34
2	Iván García Cortina (ESP)	Movistar Team	25
3	Julius Johansen (DEN)	UAE Team Emirates XRG	18
4	Jakob Schmidt (GER)	MYVELO Pro Cycling Team	13
5	Txomin Juaristi (ESP)	Euskaltel–Euskadi	13
6	Carlos García Pierna (ESP)	Burgos Burpellet BH	10
7	Iker Gomez (ESP)	Spain	10
8	Antonio Jesús Soto (ESP)	Equipo Kern Pharma	8
9	Sergio Chumil (GUA)	Burgos Burpellet BH	6
10	Gonzalo Serrano (ESP)	Movistar Team	6

=== Young rider classification ===
Final young rider classification (1–10)
Rank	Rider	Team	Time
1	Hugo de la Calle (ESP)	Burgos Burpellet BH	15h 14' 50"
2	Samuel Fernández (ESP)	Caja Rural–Seguros RGA	+ 24"
3	Diego Pescador (COL)	Movistar Team	+ 49"
4	Jan Castellon (ESP)	Caja Rural–Seguros RGA	+ 1' 02"
5	Adrià Pericas (ESP)	UAE Team Emirates XRG	+ 2' 31"
6	Pau Martí (ESP)	Spain	+ 2' 54"
7	Álex Díaz (ESP)	Caja Rural–Seguros RGA	+ 3' 23"
8	António Morgado (POR)	UAE Team Emirates XRG	+ 6' 16"
9	Jaume Guardeño (ESP)	Caja Rural–Seguros RGA	+ 8' 56"
10	Mats Wenzel (LUX)	Equipo Kern Pharma	+ 9' 31"

=== Team classification ===
Final team classification (1–10)
Rank	Team	Time
1	(United Arab Emirates) UAE Team Emirates XRG	45h 41' 08"
2	(Spain) Caja Rural–Seguros RGA	+ 5' 47"
3	(Spain) Movistar Team	+ 6' 23"
4	(Spain) Burgos Burpellet BH	+ 8' 30"
5	(Spain) Equipo Kern Pharma	+ 11' 20"
6	(Spain) Euskaltel–Euskadi	+ 26' 44"
7	(France) Team TotalEnergies	+ 46' 11"
8	(Portugal) Anicolor / Tien 21	+ 48' 37"
9	Spain	+ 1h 04' 41"
10	(Spain) Illes Balears Arabay	+ 1h 36' 10"

=== Intermediate sprints classification ===
Final sprints classification (1–10)
Rank	Rider	Team	Points
1	Jan Sommer (SUI)	MYVELO Pro Cycling Team	12
2	Fernando Barceló (ESP)	Caja Rural–Seguros RGA	6
3	Sergio Trueba (ESP)	Illes Balears Arabay	6
4	Jakob Schmidt (GER)	MYVELO Pro Cycling Team	5
5	António Morgado (POR)	UAE Team Emirates XRG	3
6	Diego Pescador (COL)	Movistar Team	3
7	Joris Delbove (FRA)	Team TotalEnergies	2
8	Carlos García Pierna (ESP)	Burgos Burpellet BH	2
9	Julius Johansen (DEN)	UAE Team Emirates XRG	2
10	Iván García Cortina (ESP)	Movistar Team	2
