= Warre Vangheluwe =

Belgian cyclist

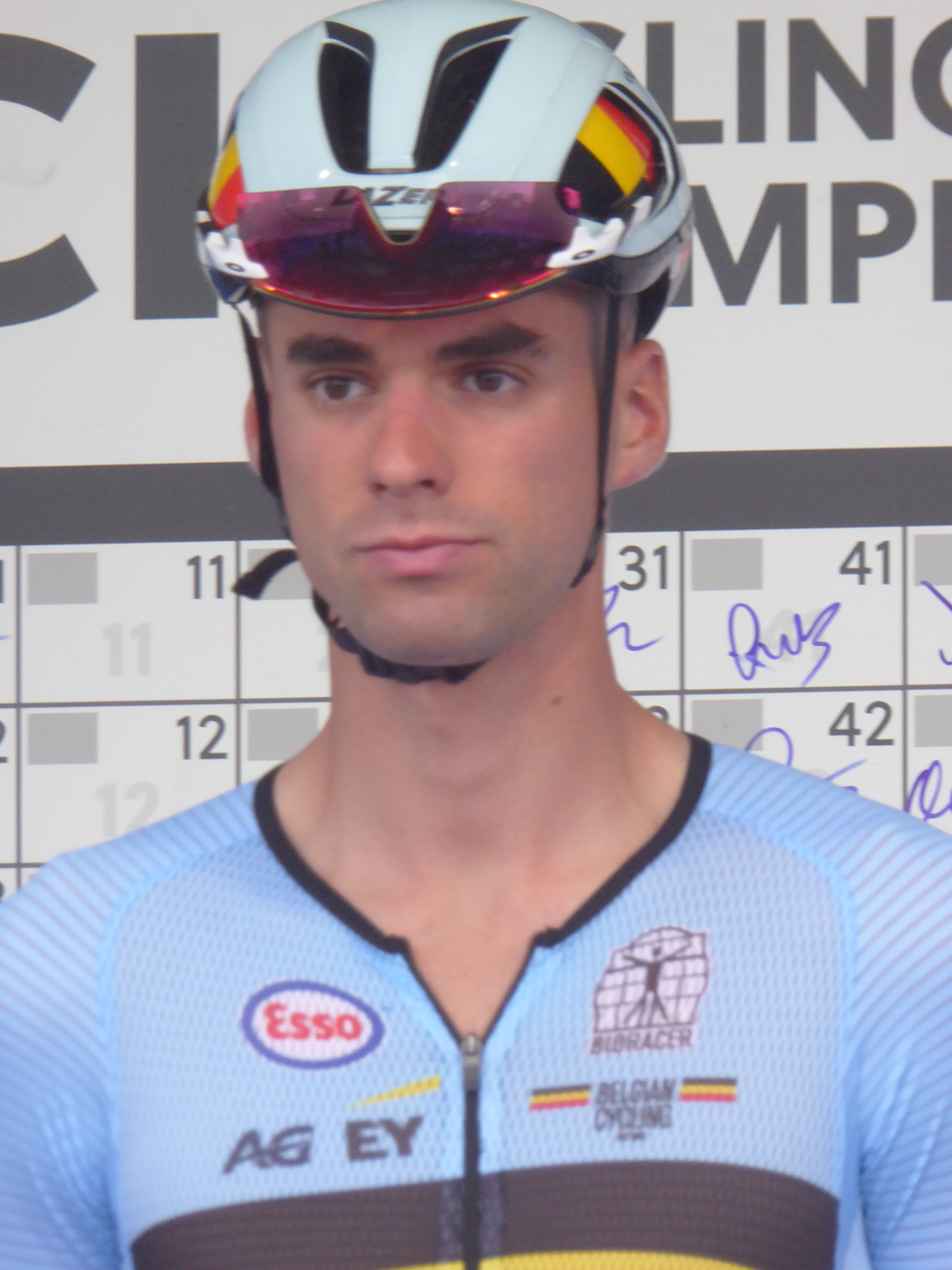
- Vangheluwe in 2023

Personal information
- Born: 23 July 2001 (age 25) Tielt, Belgium
- Height: 1.90 m (6 ft 3 in)
- Weight: 78 kg (172 lb)

Cycling career
- Sport: Cycling
- Current team: Soudal–Quick-Step
- Discipline: Road
- Role: Rider

Amateur teams
- 2018: Meubelen Gaverzicht–Glascentra CT
- 2019: Gaverzicht–BE Okay U19
- 2020–2022: Elevate p/b Home Solution-Soenens

Professional teams
- 2023: Soudal–Quick-Step Devo Team
- 2024–: Soudal–Quick-Step

Warre Vangheluwe (born 23 July 2001) is a Belgian cyclist, who currently rides for UCI WorldTeam Soudal–Quick-Step.

== Major results ==
2019
7th Ronde van Vlaanderen Juniores
2022
1st Kemmel Koerse
3rd Omloop Het Nieuwsblad U23
2023
1st Gullegem Koerse
1st Youngster Coast Challenge
1st Hel van Voerendaal
3rd Overall Tour du Loir et Cher

1st Young rider classification

3rd Omloop Het Nieuwsblad U23
2024 (2 pro wins)
1st Stage 2 Tour of Guangxi
1st Stage 4 Four Days of Dunkirk
6th Elfstedenronde
