= Marc Soler =

Spanish cyclist

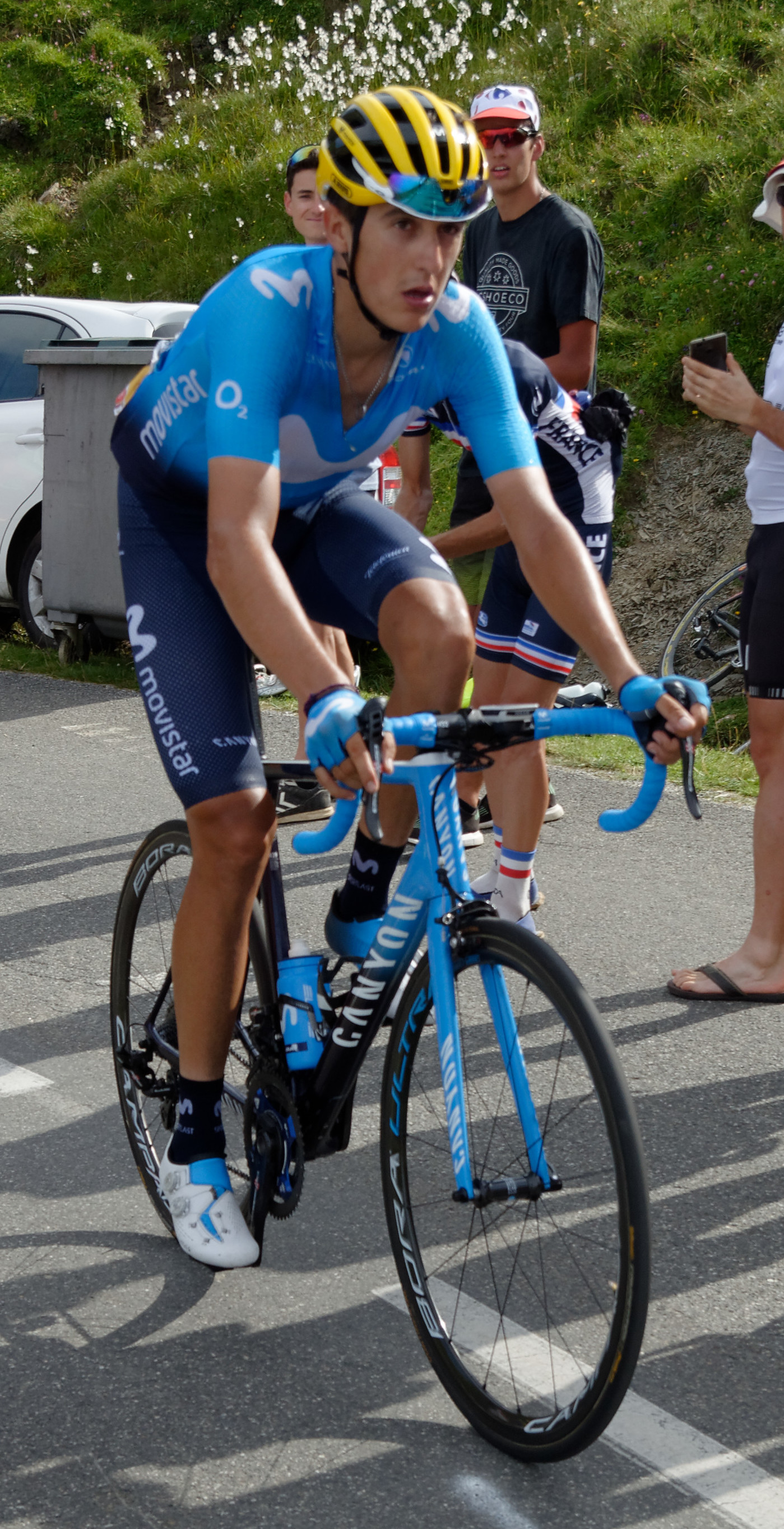
- Soler at the 2018 Tour de France

Personal information
- Full name: Marc Soler Giménez
- Born: November 22, 1993 (age 32) Vilanova i la Geltrú, Spain
- Height: 1.86 m (6 ft 1 in)
- Weight: 68 kg (150 lb; 10 st 10 lb)

Cycling career
- Sport: Cycling
- Current team: UAE Team Emirates XRG
- Discipline: Road
- Role: Rider
- Rider type: Climber

Amateur team
- 2012–2014: Lizarte

Professional teams
- 2015–2021: Movistar Team
- 2022–: UAE Team Emirates

Major wins
- Grand Tours Vuelta a España 4 individual stages (2020, 2022, 2024, 2025) 1 TTT stage (2025) Combativity award (2022, 2024) Stage races Paris–Nice (2018)

Marc Soler Giménez (born 22 November 1993) is a Spanish cyclist, who currently rides for UCI WorldTeam UAE Team Emirates XRG.

== Career ==
Soler was born in Vilanova i la Geltrú. In 2017, Soler finished third overall behind team mate Alejandro Valverde and Alberto Contador in the Volta a Catalunya, winning the young rider's classification. Later that year was named in the startlist for the Vuelta a España.

In March 2018, he won the Paris–Nice stage race. Having started the final stage 37 seconds down on race leader Simon Yates (Mitchelton–Scott) in sixth place overall, Soler attacked around halfway into the stage along with compatriot David de la Cruz (Team Sky); the duo joined Omar Fraile (Astana) at the head of the race, and the trio managed to stay clear of the rest of the field by the time they reached Nice. As de la Cruz and Fraile contested stage honours, Soler finished third – acquiring four bonus seconds on the finish in addition to three gained at an earlier intermediate sprint – and with a 35-second gap to Yates and the remaining general classification contenders, it was enough to give Soler victory over Yates by four seconds.

In June 2021, Soler was forced to abandon the 2021 Tour de France, after being involved in a crash on the opening stage and suffering fractures to both arms' radial heads and his left ulnar head.

== Major results ==
2013
1st Stage 3 Vuelta a Palencia
2014
1st Soraluzeko Saria
1st Ereñoko Udala Sari Nagusia
1st Grand Prix Kutxabank
1st Memorial Cirilo Zunzarren
1st Stage 3 Vuelta a Zamora
3rd Time trial, National Under-23 Road Championships
2015
1st Overall Tour de l'Avenir
6th Klasika Primavera
2016 (1 pro win)
2nd Overall Route du Sud

1st Young rider classification
1st Stage 4

7th Circuito de Getxo
2017
3rd Overall Volta a Catalunya

1st Young rider classification

4th Time trial, National Road Championships
5th GP Miguel Induráin
8th Overall Tour de Suisse
Combativity award Stage 9 Vuelta a España
2018 (1)
1st Overall Paris–Nice

1st Young rider classification

3rd Overall Vuelta a Andalucía
5th Overall Volta a Catalunya
6th Overall Vuelta a Aragón
6th GP Miguel Induráin
2019
8th Overall Vuelta a Aragón
9th Overall Vuelta a España
2020 (2)
1st Pollença–Andratx
Vuelta a España

1st Stage 2
Combativity award Stages 11, 14 & 17

8th Overall Vuelta a Andalucía
2021 (1)
4th Overall Tour de Romandie

1st Stage 3

2022 (1)
Vuelta a España

1st Stage 5
Combativity award Stage 5 & Overall

7th Overall Tour of the Basque Country
2023
4th Overall Volta a Catalunya
2024 (2)
Vuelta a España

1st Stage 16
Held after Stages 18–19
Combativity award Stages 16, 18, 20 & Overall

1st Stage 3 (TTT) Paris–Nice
4th Overall Tour of the Basque Country
9th Trofeo Pollença–Port d'Andratx
10th Clásica Jaén Paraíso Interior
2025 (3)
1st Overall Vuelta a Asturias

1st Points classification
1st Mountains classification
1st Stage 4

Vuelta a España

1st Stages 5 (TTT) & 14
Combativity award Stage 14

7th Overall Vuelta a Andalucía
2026 (1)
1st Stage 1 Vuelta a Murcia
6th Overall Paris–Nice

=== General classification results timeline ===
Grand Tour general classification results
Grand Tour	2015	2016	2017	2018	2019	2020	2021	2022	2023	2024	2025	2026
Giro d'Italia	—	—	—	—	—	—	DNF	—	—	—	—	DNF
Tour de France	—	—	—	62	37	21	DNF	DNF	56	44	29	
Vuelta a España	—	—	48	—	9	18	—	27	14	41	26	
Major stage race general classification results
Major stage race	2015	2016	2017	2018	2019	2020	2021	2022	2023	2024	2025	2026
Paris–Nice	—	—	24	1	50	—	—	—	—	DNF	—	6
Tirreno–Adriatico	—	—	—	—	—	—	11	15	—	—	—	—
Volta a Catalunya	DNF	DNF	3	5	DNF	NH	76	DNF	4	46	26	37
Tour of the Basque Country	—	—	—	—	—	NH	—	7	DNF	4	50	28
Tour de Romandie	—	—	—	—	—	NH	4	—	—	—	—	—
Critérium du Dauphiné	—	79	—	16	—	DNF	—	—	—	17	88	
Tour de Suisse	—	—	8	—	12	NH	79	DNF	—	—	—	

Legend
—	Did not compete
DNF	Did not finish
NH	Not held
