= Steff Cras =

Belgian cyclist (born 1996)

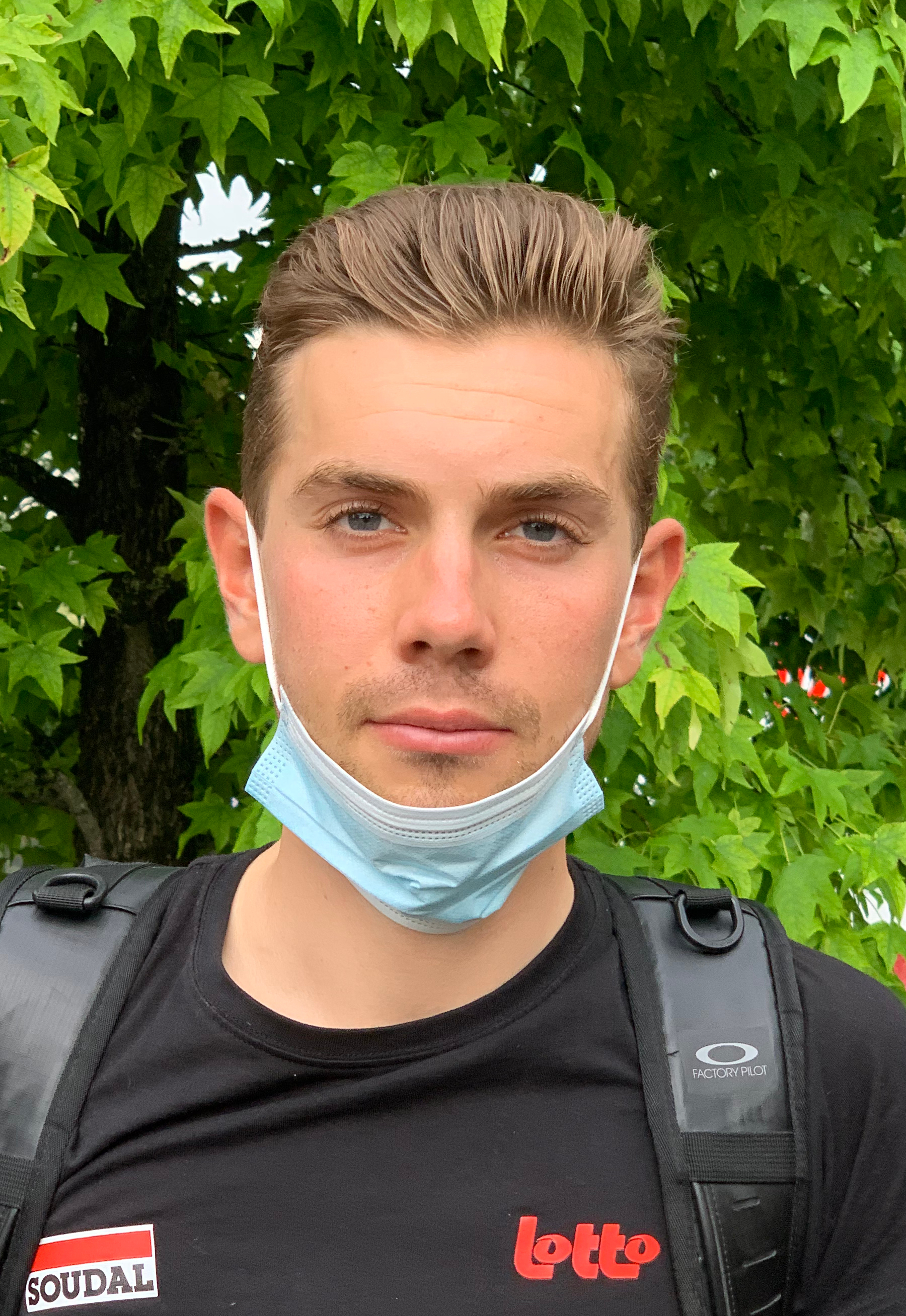
- Cras in 2021

Personal information
- Born: 13 February 1996 (age 30) Geel, Belgium
- Height: 1.83 m (6 ft 0 in)
- Weight: 67 kg (148 lb)

Cycling career
- Sport: Cycling
- Current team: Team TotalEnergies
- Discipline: Road
- Role: Rider
- Rider type: Climber

Amateur teams
- 2015–2016: Lotto–Soudal U23
- 2017: BMC Development Team

Professional teams
- 2018–2019: Team Katusha–Alpecin
- 2020–2022: Lotto–Soudal
- 2023–2025: Team TotalEnergies
- 2026–: Soudal–Quick-Step

Steff Cras (born 13 February 1996) is a Belgian professional cyclist who rides for UCI WorldTeam Soudal–Quick-Step.

== Career ==
In August 2019 he rode the 2019 Vuelta a España. In October 2019 Cras had been announced to join Lotto–Soudal on an initial two-year deal following the demise of his current team Team Katusha–Alpecin. In August 2020, he was named in the startlist for the 2020 Tour de France. This was his first ever Tour, his job was to ride in support of Caleb Ewan who was aiming for the Green Points Jersey. The 2021 Volta a Catalunya was a race where COVID-19 was rampant, Cras caught COVID and had to abandon the race before the last stage. After two years at Lotto–Soudal Cras announced a one-year contract extension to remain with the team till the end of 2022. On 17 August 2022 it was announced that Cras would join Team TotalEnergies for two seasons from 2023. Cras started in the 2022 Vuelta a España but crashed heavily in Stage 2 so did not finish the stage and pulled out of the race.

In August 2025, Cras signed with UCI WorldTeam Soudal–Quick-Step ahead of the 2026 season.

== Major results ==
2014
2nd Overall Tour du Valromey

1st Stage 1

2015
10th Overall Ronde de l'Isard
2016
8th Overall Ronde de l'Isard
8th Overall Course de la Paix U23
8th Overall Tour de Savoie Mont-Blanc
2017
3rd Time trial, National Under-23 Road Championships
3rd Overall Ronde de l'Isard
4th Overall Tour Alsace
5th Overall Tour de l'Avenir
5th Overall Grand Prix Priessnitz spa
5th Gran Premio Palio del Recioto
2018
7th Overall Arctic Race of Norway
7th Overall Okolo Slovenska
2019
9th Tokyo 2020 Test Event
2022
4th Classic Grand Besançon Doubs
5th Mercan'Tour Classic
8th Clásica Jaén Paraíso Interior
2023
5th Overall Vuelta a Asturias
7th Tour du Doubs
2024
8th GP Miguel Induráin
8th Vuelta a Murcia
9th Overall Tour of Slovenia
2025 (1 pro win)
1st Stage 1 Vuelta a Asturias
3rd Overall Route d'Occitanie
3rd Giro della Toscana
5th Time trial, National Road Championships
6th Overall Vuelta a Andalucía

=== Grand Tour general classification results timeline ===
Grand Tour	2019	2020	2021	2022	2023	2024
Giro d'Italia	—	—	—	—	—	—
Tour de France	—	DNF	—	—	DNF	16
Vuelta a España	76	—	20	DNF	11	—

Legend
—	Did not compete
DNF	Did not finish
