= Diego Uriarte =

Spanish cyclist (born 2001)

Personal information
- Full name: Diego Uriarte Belzunegi
- Born: 26 October 2001 (age 24) Barañain, Navarre, Spain
- Height: 1.80 m (5 ft 11 in)
- Weight: 67 kg (148 lb)

Cycling career
- Sport: Cycling
- Current team: Equipo Kern Pharma
- Discipline: Road
- Role: Rider

Amateur team
- 2019–2023: Lizarte

Professional team
- 2024–: Equipo Kern Pharma

Diego Uriarte Belzunegi (born 26 October 2001) is a Spanish cyclist, who currently rides for UCI ProTeam Equipo Kern Pharma.

== Major results ==
2023
1st Overall Vuelta a la Comunidad de Madrid

1st Stage 5

1st Gran Premio Primavera de Ontur
1st Stage 1 (ITT) Vuelta a Galicia
1st Stage 1 (TTT) Vuelta a Extremadura
5th Overall Vuelta a Navarra
2025 (1 pro win)
1st Stage 4 Vuelta a Andalucía
9th Overall AlUla Tour
