= Clément Berthet =

French cyclist

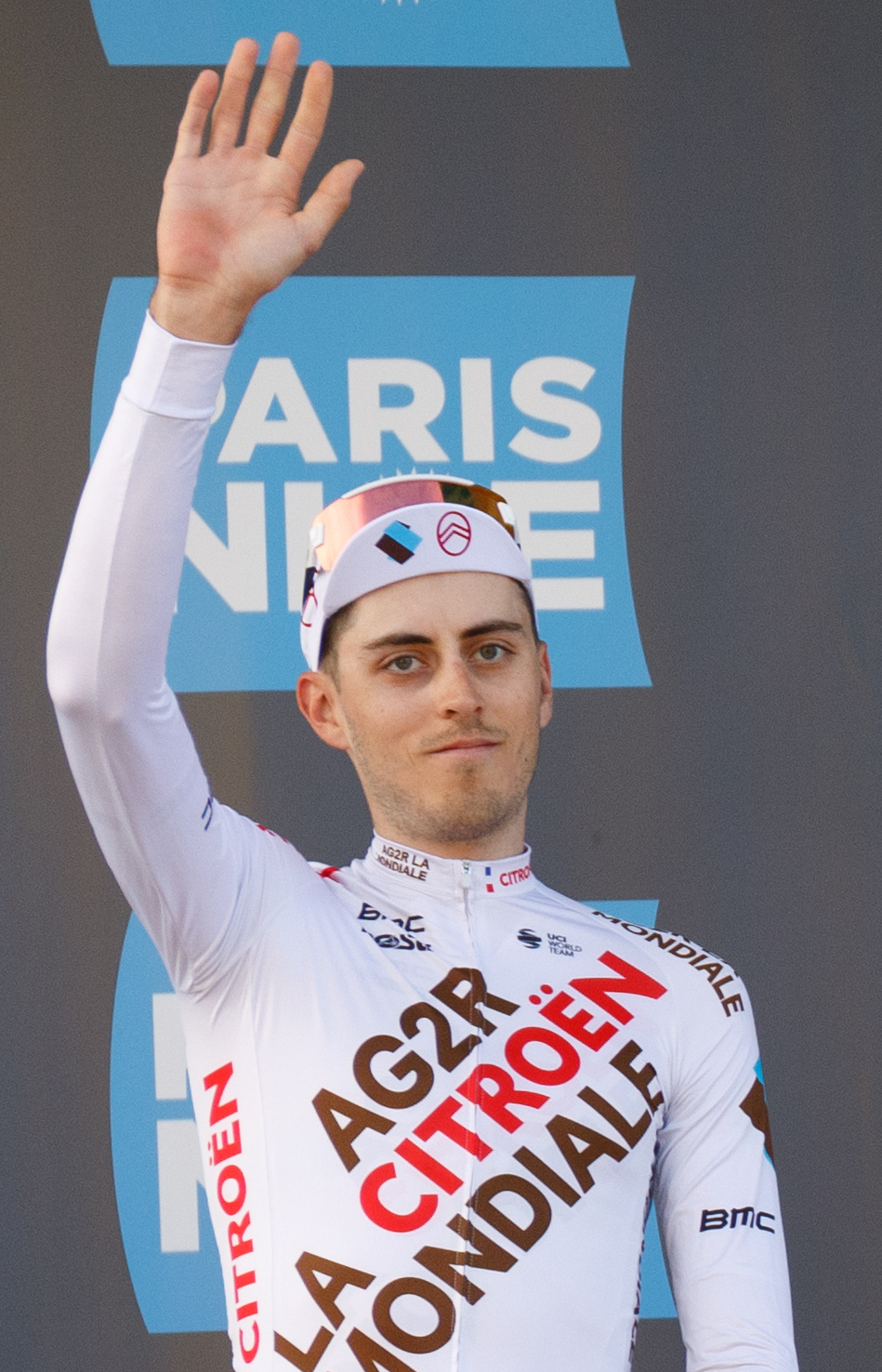
- Clément Berthet in 2023

Personal information
- Born: 2 August 1997 (age 29) Pierre-Bénite, France
- Height: 1.83 m (6 ft 0 in)
- Weight: 68 kg (150 lb)

Cycling career
- Sport: Cycling
- Current team: Groupama–FDJ United
- Disciplines: Road; Mountain biking (former)
- Role: Rider

Amateur team
- VC Ornans

Professional teams
- 2021: Delko
- 2021–2025: AG2R Citroën Team
- 2026–: Groupama–FDJ United

Clément Berthet (born 2 August 1997) is a French road cyclist and former cross-country mountain biker, who currently rides for UCI WorldTeam Groupama–FDJ United.

Berthet switched to road cycling in 2021, signing a four-year contract with Delko. However, on 1 August 2021, he made a mid-season transfer to AG2R Citroën Team, signing a three-year contract. In August 2025, Berthet signed a three year contract with Groupama–FDJ. Berthet married fellow professional cyclist Juliette Berthet in October 2025.

== Major results ==
2023
6th Classic Grand Besançon Doubs
6th Mercan'Tour Classic
6th Tour du Jura
2024
2nd Mercan'Tour Classic
2nd Tour du Doubs
7th Tour du Jura
8th Classic Grand Besançon Doubs
2025
2nd Overall Vuelta a Andalucía
4th Overall Tour Poitou-Charentes en Nouvelle-Aquitaine
7th Clásica Jaén Paraíso Interior
2026
4th Veneto Classic
8th Overall Vuelta a España
8th Classic Grand Besançon Doubs

=== Grand Tour general classification results timeline ===
Grand Tour	2023	2024	2025	2026
Giro d'Italia	—	—	—	—
Tour de France	25	—	36	DNF
Vuelta a España	—	20	—	8

Legend
—	Did not compete
DNF	Did not finish
IP	Race in Progress
