= Hugo de la Calle =

Spanish cyclist (born 2000)

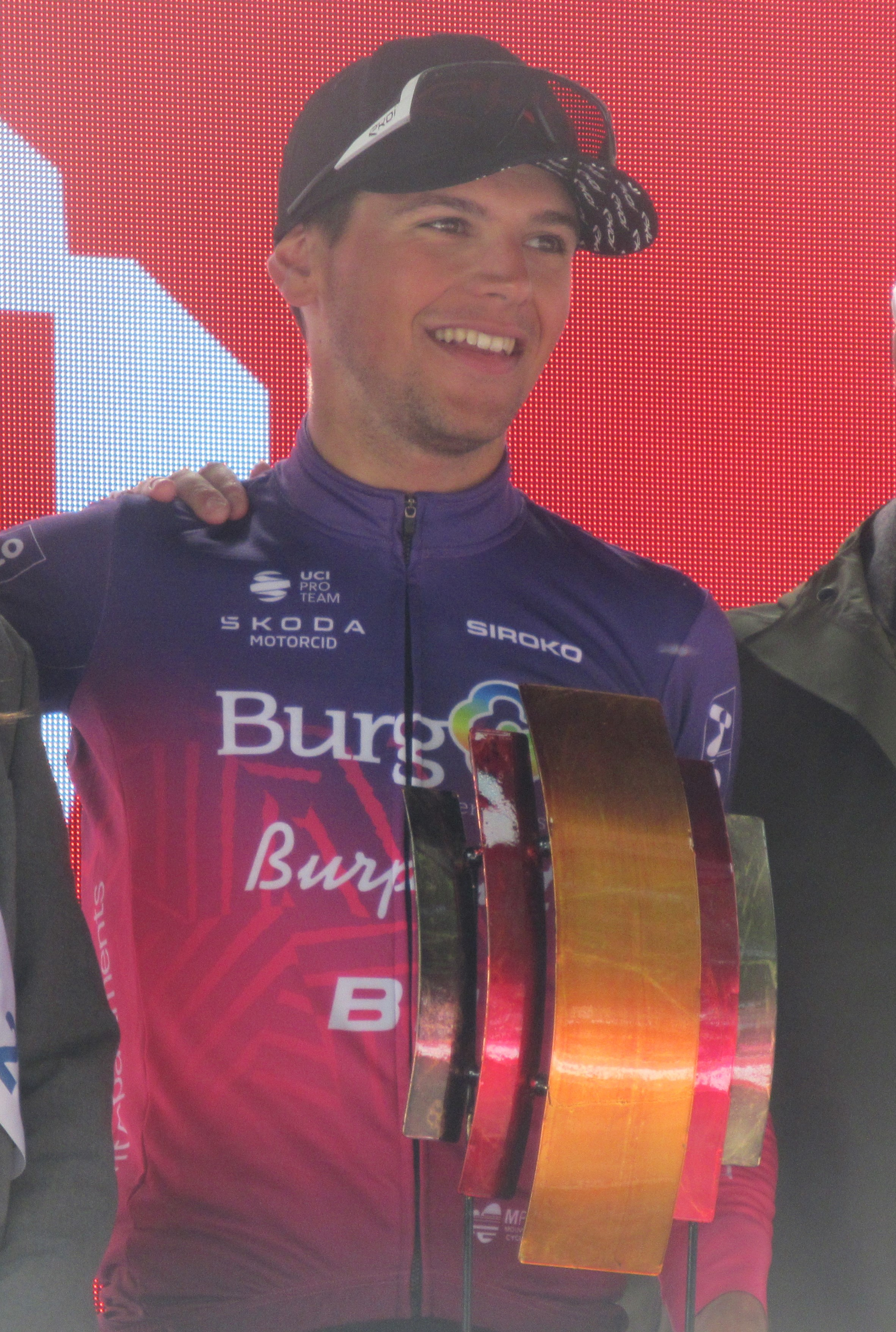
- de la Calle in 2025

Personal information
- Full name: Hugo de la Calle Arango
- Born: 12 July 2004 (age 22) Castrillón, Spain
- Height: 1.80 m (5 ft 11 in)
- Weight: 65 kg (143 lb)

Cycling career
- Sport: Cycling
- Current team: Burgos Burpellet BH
- Discipline: Road
- Role: Rider

Amateur teams
- 2020–2022: MMR Cycling Academy
- 2023: Caja Rural–Alea
- 2024: Padronés Cortizo

Professional team
- 2025–: Burgos Burpellet BH

Hugo de la Calle Arango (born 12 July 2004) is a Spanish cyclist, who currently rides for UCI ProTeam Burgos Burpellet BH.

== Major results ==
2022
3rd Time trial, National Junior Road Championships
2024
1st Road race, National Under-23 Road Championships
2025
4th Overall Vuelta a Asturias

1st Young rider classification

9th Trofeo Tessile & Moda
10th Coppa Agostoni
Combativity award Stage 1 Vuelta a España

=== Grand Tour general classification results timeline ===
Grand Tour	2025
Giro d'Italia	—
Tour de France	—
Vuelta a España	63

Legend
—	Did not compete
DNF	Did not finish
IP	In progress
