= Euskaltel–Euskadi =

Spanish team

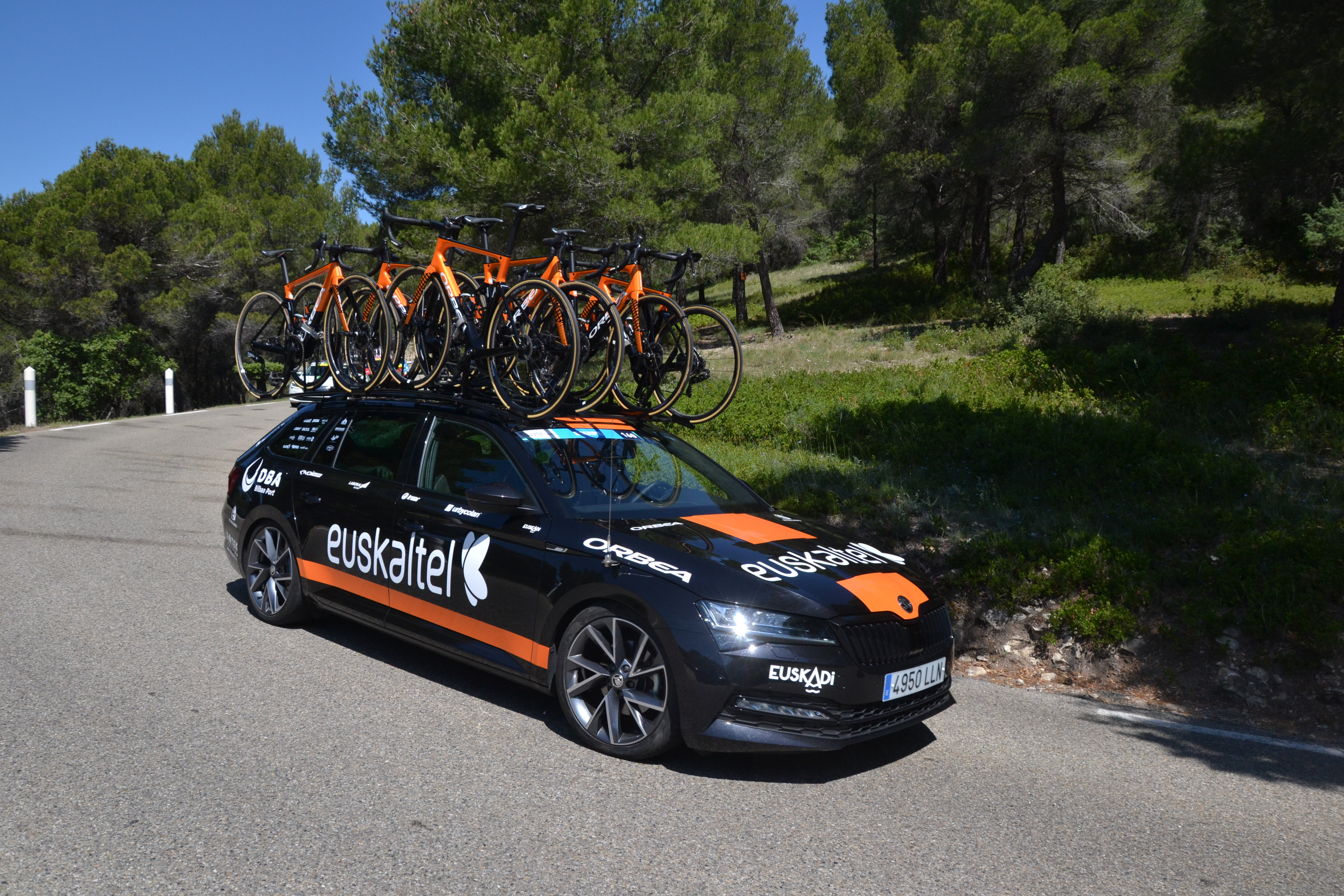

Team information
- UCI code: EUS
- Registered: Spain
- Founded: 2008
- Discipline: Road
- Status: Amateur (2008–2017); UCI Continental (2018–2019); UCI ProTeam (2020–)
- Bicycles: Orbea

Team name history
- 2008–2013 2014 2015–2017 2018–2019 2020 2020–: Naturgas Energía; EDP Energía; Fundación Euskadi–EDP; Fundación Euskadi (EUK); Fundación–Orbea (FOR); Euskaltel–Euskadi

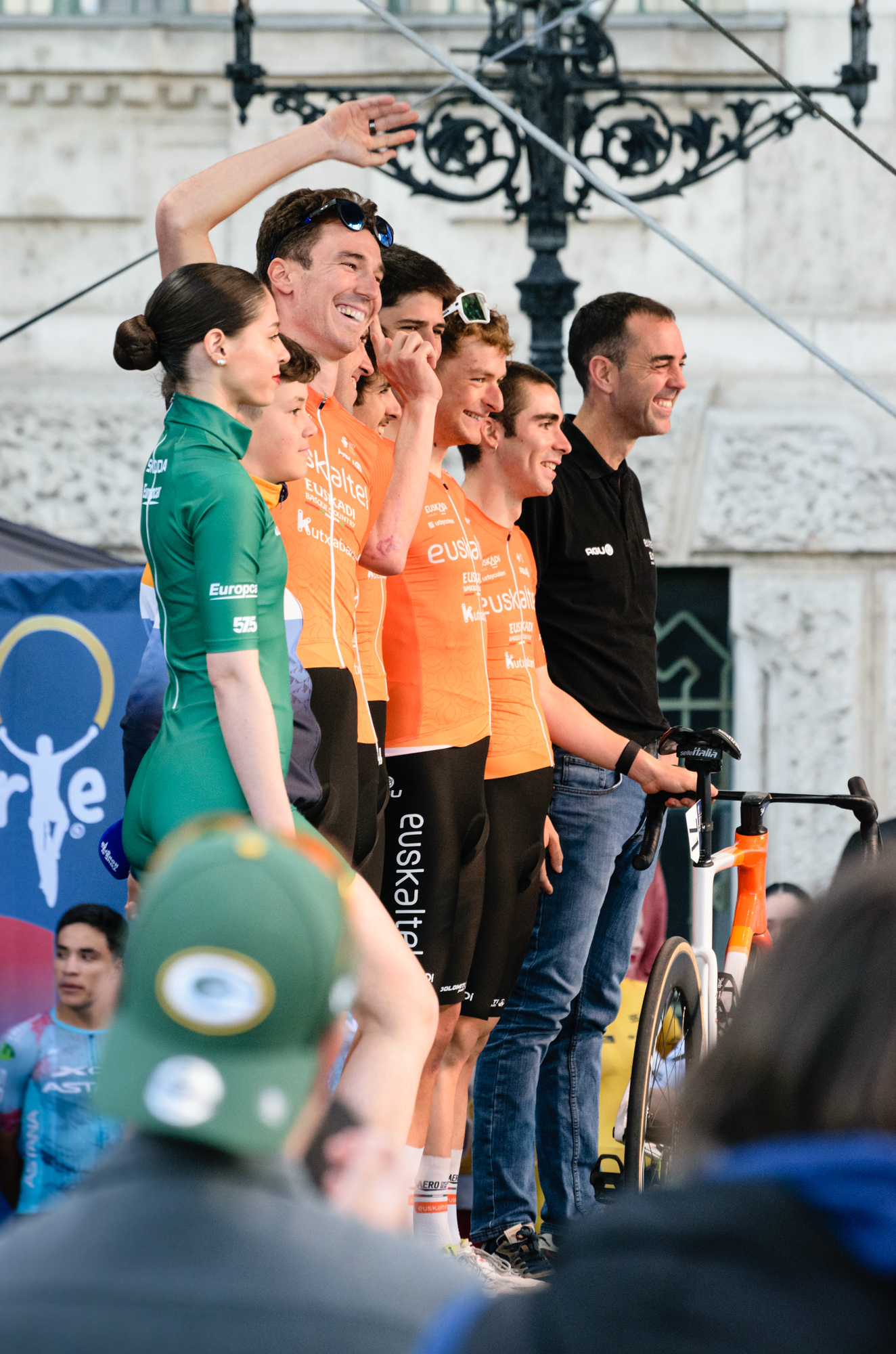
The team at the 2025 Tour de Hongrie (fltr: Dina, Juaristi, Murguialday, López de Abetxuko, Sutton, Mintegi and sports director Jorge Azanza)

Euskaltel–Euskadi is a Spanish UCI ProTeam road cycling team founded in 2008. It was initially an amateur team, but upgraded to Continental level in 2018.

Having spent two years as a UCI Continental team, the team registered their interest to become a UCI ProTeam for the 2020 season, and were granted a ProTeam licence in December 2019. In February 2020, it was announced that Spanish telecommunications company Euskaltel were to become the team's title sponsor for four years, from that year's Tour of the Basque Country – later cancelled due to the COVID-19 pandemic in Spain. The company had sponsored the previous Euskaltel–Euskadi team between 1998 and 2013, before the team disbanded.

== Team roster ==
As of 21 March 2025.

Rider	Date of birth
Jon Aberasturi (ESP)	28 March 1989 (aged 35)
Jon Agirre (ESP)	10 September 1997 (aged 27)
Nicolás Alustiza (ESP)	4 January 2003 (aged 21)
Xabier Berasategi (ESP)	4 August 2000 (aged 24)
Mikel Bizkarra (ESP)	21 August 1989 (aged 35)
Iker Bonillo (ESP)	9 July 2003 (aged 21)
Víctor de la Parte (ESP)	22 June 1986 (aged 38)
David Dekker (NED)	2 February 1998 (aged 26)
Márton Dina (HUN)	11 April 1996 (aged 28)
Ander Ganzábal (ESP)	25 January 2000 (aged 24)
Paul Hennequin (FRA)	9 December 2002 (aged 22)

Rider	Date of birth
Xabier Isasa (ESP)	24 August 2001 (aged 23)
Txomin Juaristi (ESP)	20 July 1995 (aged 29)
Andoni López de Abetxuko (ESP)	3 August 1999 (aged 25)
Jordi López (ESP)	14 August 1998 (aged 26)
Gotzon Martín (ESP)	15 February 1996 (aged 28)
Iker Mintegui (ESP)	15 November 2002 (aged 22)
Jokin Murguialday (ESP)	19 March 2000 (aged 24)
Louis Sutton (GBR)	27 May 2002 (aged 22)
Danny van der Tuuk (POL)	5 November 1999 (aged 25)
Unai Zubeldia (ESP)	7 July 2003 (aged 21)

== Major wins ==
2015
Stage 3 Ronde de l'Isard, Xabier San Sebastián
2019
Stage 4 Volta ao Alentejo, Sergio Higuita
2021
Vuelta a Murcia, Antonio Jesús Soto
Stage 1 Volta ao Alentejo, Juan José Lobato
2022
Stage 4 Volta ao Alentejo, Xabier Azparren
Stage 5 Volta ao Alentejo, Juan José Lobato
2023
Stage 6 Volta a Portugal, Luis Ángel Maté
Stage 10 (ITT) Volta a Portugal, Txomin Juaristi
2024
Stage 4 Volta a Portugal, Luis Ángel Maté
2025
See 2025 Euskaltel–Euskadi season
2026
1st Gran Premio Primavera Ontur, Axel van der Tuuk

== Supplementary statistics ==
Grand Tours by highest finishing position
Race	2020	2021	2022	2023	2024
Giro d'Italia	—	—	—	—	—
Tour de France	—	—	—	—	—
Vuelta a España	—	30	28	—	
Major week-long stage races by highest finishing position
Race	2020	2021	2022	2023	2024
Tour Down Under	—	NH		—	—
Paris–Nice	—	—	—	—	—
Tirreno–Adriatico	—	—	—	—	—
Volta a Catalunya	NH	17	48	24	32
Tour of the Basque Country	NH	53	29	21	36
Tour de Romandie	NH	—	—	—	—
Critérium du Dauphiné	—	—	—	—	—
Tour de Suisse	NH	—	—	—	—
Tour de Pologne	—	—	—	—	—
Benelux Tour	—	—	NH	—	—
Monument races by highest finishing position
Monument	2020	2021	2022	2023	2024
Milan–San Remo	—	—	—	—	—
Tour of Flanders	—	—	—	—	—
Paris–Roubaix	NH	—	—	—	—
Liège–Bastogne–Liège	—	—	—	—	—
Il Lombardia	—	—	—	—	—
Classics by highest finishing position
Classic	2020	2021	2022	2023	2024
Omloop Het Nieuwsblad	—	—	—	—	—
Kuurne–Brussels–Kuurne	—	—	—	—	—
Strade Bianche	—	—	—	—	—
E3 Saxo Bank Classic	NH	—	—	—	—
Gent–Wevelgem	—	—	—	—	—
Amstel Gold Race	NH	—	—	—	—
La Flèche Wallonne	—	—	—	—	33
Clásica de San Sebastián	NH	67	48	35	57
Paris–Tours	16	48	—	—	—

Legend
—	Did not compete
DNF	Did not finish
IP	Race in Progress
NH	Not held
