= Alan Jousseaume =

French bicycle racer

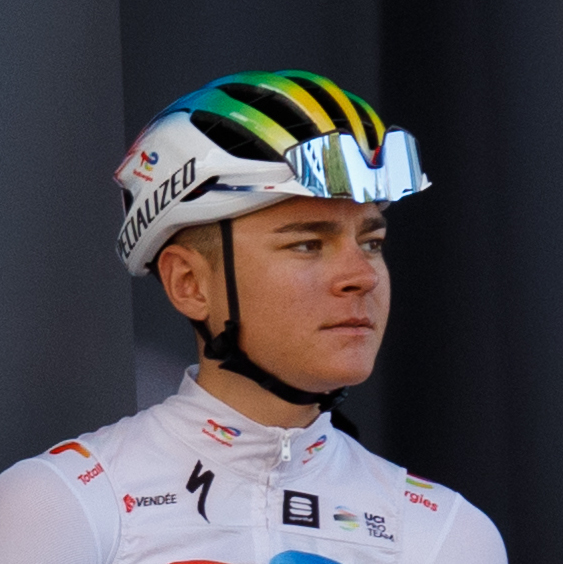
- Jousseaume in 2023

Personal information
- Born: 3 August 1998 (age 28) Vannes, France
- Height: 1.77 m (5 ft 10 in)

Cycling career
- Sport: Cycling
- Current team: Team TotalEnergies
- Discipline: Road
- Role: Rider

Amateur teams
- 2016–2018: VS Valletais
- 2019–2021: Vendée U
- 2021: Team TotalEnergies (stagiaire)

Professional team
- 2022–: Team TotalEnergies

Alan Jousseaume (born 3 August 1998) is a French cyclist, who currently rides for UCI ProTeam Team TotalEnergies.

== Major results ==
2020
2nd Tour du Jura
3rd Overall Ronde de l'Isard
2021
1st Tour du Jura
6th Overall Tour Alsace
2022
9th Classic Loire Atlantique

=== Grand Tour general classification results timeline ===
Grand Tour	2023
Giro d'Italia	—
Tour de France	—
Vuelta a España	DNF

Legend
—	Did not compete
DNF	Did not finish
