= Txomin Juaristi =

Spanish road bicycle racer

Personal information
- Full name: Txomin Juaristi Arrieta
- Born: 20 July 1995 (age 31) Markina-Xemein, Spain
- Height: 1.82 m (6 ft 0 in)
- Weight: 67.5 kg (149 lb)

Cycling career
- Sport: Cycling
- Current team: Euskaltel–Euskadi
- Discipline: Road
- Role: Rider

Amateur teams
- 2014–2016: Café Baqué–Conservas Campos
- 2017: Baqué–BH
- 2017: Euskadi Basque Country–Murias (stagiaire)

Professional team
- 2018–: Fundación Euskadi

Txomin Juaristi Arrieta (born 20 July 1995) is a Spanish cyclist, who currently rides for UCI ProTeam Euskaltel–Euskadi.

== Major results ==
2017
2nd Overall Volta a Portugal do Futuro
2019
5th Klasika Primavera
6th Overall Volta ao Alentejo
2022
10th Overall Volta a Portugal
2023 (1 pro win)
2nd Overall Volta a Portugal

1st Stage 10 (ITT)

2024
5th Time trial, National Road Championships
2025
2nd Overall Vuelta a Asturias
7th Tour du Doubs
2026
7th Overall O Gran Camiño
