= 2026 Vuelta a España, Stage 1 to Stage 11 =

Vuelta a España stages (cycling)

The 2026 Vuelta a España is a three-week cycling race which is taking place in Monaco, France, Andorra and Spain. It is the 81st edition of the Vuelta a España and the third and final grand tour of the 2026 men's road cycling season. It started on 22 August in Monaco, and will finish on 13 September in Granada.

== Classification standings ==
Legend
Denotes the leader of the general classification	Denotes the leader of the young rider classification
Denotes the leader of the points classification	Denotes the leader of the team classification
Denotes the leader of the mountains classification	Denotes the winner of the combativity award

== Stage 1 ==
22 August 2026 – Monaco to Monaco, 9 km (5.6 mi) (ITT)

Stage 1 Result
Rank	Rider	Team	Time
1	Tadej Pogačar (SLO)	UAE Team Emirates XRG	10' 57"
2	Ethan Hayter (GBR)	Soudal–Quick-Step	+ 0"
3	Joshua Tarling (GBR)	Netcompany INEOS	+ 4"
4	Callum Thornley (GBR)	Red Bull–Bora–Hansgrohe	+ 5"
5	Christophe Laporte (FRA)	Visma–Lease a Bike	+ 6"
6	Oscar Chamberlain (AUS)	Decathlon CMA CGM	+ 8"
7	Léo Bisiaux (FRA)	Decathlon CMA CGM	+ 9"
8	Wout van Aert (BEL)	Visma–Lease a Bike	+ 9"
9	Finn Fisher-Black (NZL)	Red Bull–Bora–Hansgrohe	+ 10"
10	Arthur Kluckers (LUX)	Tudor Pro Cycling Team	+ 11"

General classification after Stage 1
Rank	Rider	Team	Time
1	Tadej Pogačar (SLO)	UAE Team Emirates XRG	10' 57"
2	Ethan Hayter (GBR)	Soudal–Quick-Step	+ 0"
3	Joshua Tarling (GBR)	Netcompany INEOS	+ 4"
4	Callum Thornley (GBR)	Red Bull–Bora–Hansgrohe	+ 5"
5	Christophe Laporte (FRA)	Visma–Lease a Bike	+ 6"
6	Oscar Chamberlain (AUS)	Decathlon CMA CGM	+ 8"
7	Léo Bisiaux (FRA)	Decathlon CMA CGM	+ 9"
8	Wout van Aert (BEL)	Visma–Lease a Bike	+ 9"
9	Finn Fisher-Black (NZL)	Red Bull–Bora–Hansgrohe	+ 10"
10	Arthur Kluckers (LUX)	Tudor Pro Cycling Team	+ 11"

== Stage 2 ==
23 August 2026 – Monaco to Manosque (France), 215.5 km (133.9 mi)

Stage 2 Result
Rank	Rider	Team	Time
1	Matthew Brennan (GBR)	Visma–Lease a Bike	4h 47' 47"
2	Pau Miquel (ESP)	Team Bahrain Victorious	+ 0"
3	Tadej Pogačar (SLO)	UAE Team Emirates XRG	+ 0"
4	Mads Pedersen (DEN)	Lidl–Trek	+ 0"
5	Hugo Hofstetter (FRA)	NSN Cycling Team	+ 0"
6	Tobias Halland Johannessen (NOR)	Uno-X Mobility	+ 0"
7	Finn Fisher-Black (NZL)	Red Bull–Bora–Hansgrohe	+ 0"
8	Axel Laurance (FRA)	Netcompany INEOS	+ 0"
9	Oscar Onley (GBR)	Netcompany INEOS	+ 0"
10	Orluis Aular (VEN)	Movistar Team	+ 0"

General classification after Stage 2
Rank	Rider	Team	Time
1	Tadej Pogačar (SLO)	UAE Team Emirates XRG	4h 58' 40"
2	Wout van Aert (BEL)	Visma–Lease a Bike	+ 9"
3	Matthew Brennan (GBR)	Visma–Lease a Bike	+ 10"
4	Léo Bisiaux (FRA)	Decathlon CMA CGM	+ 12"
5	Finn Fisher-Black (NZL)	Red Bull–Bora–Hansgrohe	+ 14"
6	Stefan Küng (SUI)	Tudor Pro Cycling Team	+ 18"
7	Jay Vine (AUS)	UAE Team Emirates XRG	+ 18"
8	Mads Pedersen (DEN)	Lidl–Trek	+ 20"
9	Primož Roglič (SLO)	Red Bull–Bora–Hansgrohe	+ 26"
10	Jordan Labrosse (FRA)	Decathlon CMA CGM	+ 27"

== Stage 3 ==
24 August 2026 – Gruissan (France) to Font Romeu (France), 166.7 km (103.6 mi)

The stage was neutralised and then cancelled with around 15 km (9.3 mi) remaining due to a severe hailstorm.

General classification after Stage 3
Rank	Rider	Team	Time
1	Tadej Pogačar (SLO)	UAE Team Emirates XRG	4h 58' 40"
2	Wout van Aert (BEL)	Visma–Lease a Bike	+ 9"
3	Matthew Brennan (GBR)	Visma–Lease a Bike	+ 10"
4	Léo Bisiaux (FRA)	Decathlon CMA CGM	+ 12"
5	Finn Fisher-Black (NZL)	Red Bull–Bora–Hansgrohe	+ 14"
6	Stefan Küng (SUI)	Tudor Pro Cycling Team	+ 18"
7	Jay Vine (AUS)	UAE Team Emirates XRG	+ 18"
8	Mads Pedersen (DEN)	Lidl–Trek	+ 20"
9	Primož Roglič (SLO)	Red Bull–Bora–Hansgrohe	+ 26"
10	Jordan Labrosse (FRA)	Decathlon CMA CGM	+ 27"

== Stage 4 ==
25 August 2026 – Andorra la Vella (Andorra) to Andorra la Vella (Andorra), 104.9 km (65.2 mi)

Stage 4 Result
Rank	Rider	Team	Time
1	Tadej Pogačar (SLO)	UAE Team Emirates XRG	2h 40' 25"
2	Jarno Widar (BEL)	Lotto–Intermarché	+ 2' 39"
3	Felix Gall (AUT)	Decathlon CMA CGM	+ 2' 39"
4	Oscar Onley (GBR)	Netcompany INEOS	+ 2' 39"
5	Sepp Kuss (USA)	Visma–Lease a Bike	+ 2' 39"
6	Enric Mas (ESP)	Movistar Team	+ 2' 39"
7	Primož Roglič (SLO)	Red Bull–Bora–Hansgrohe	+ 2' 39"
8	Richard Carapaz (ECU)	EF Education–EasyPost	+ 2' 57"
9	Mattias Skjelmose (DEN)	Lidl–Trek	+ 3' 17"
10	Gregor Mühlberger (AUT)	Decathlon CMA CGM	+ 3' 17"

General classification after Stage 4
Rank	Rider	Team	Time
1	Tadej Pogačar (SLO)	UAE Team Emirates XRG	7h 38' 59"
2	Primož Roglič (SLO)	Red Bull–Bora–Hansgrohe	+ 3' 21"
3	Enric Mas (ESP)	Movistar Team	+ 3' 32"
4	Sepp Kuss (USA)	Visma–Lease a Bike	+ 3' 44"
5	Oscar Onley (GBR)	Netcompany INEOS	+ 3' 45"
6	Richard Carapaz (ECU)	EF Education–EasyPost	+ 3' 50"
7	Felix Gall (AUT)	Decathlon CMA CGM	+ 3' 57"
8	Mattias Skjelmose (DEN)	Lidl–Trek	+ 4' 06"
9	Jarno Widar (BEL)	Lotto–Intermarché	+ 4' 06"
10	Jay Vine (AUS)	UAE Team Emirates XRG	+ 4' 11"

== Stage 5 ==
26 August 2026 – Falset to Roquetes, 171.1 km (106.3 mi)

Stage 5 Result
Rank	Rider	Team	Time
1	Matthew Brennan (GBR)	Visma–Lease a Bike	3h 47' 02"
2	Jordi Meeus (BEL)	Red Bull–Bora–Hansgrohe	+ 0"
3	Vincenzo Albanese (ITA)	EF Education–EasyPost	+ 0"
4	Alessandro Romele (ITA)	XDS Astana Team	+ 0"
5	Axel Laurance (FRA)	Netcompany INEOS	+ 0"
6	Christophe Laporte (FRA)	Visma–Lease a Bike	+ 0"
7	Alberto Dainese (ITA)	Soudal–Quick-Step	+ 0"
8	Vito Braet (BEL)	Lotto–Intermarché	+ 0"
9	David González (ESP)	Pinarello–Q36.5 Pro Cycling Team	+ 0"
10	Wout van Aert (BEL)	Visma–Lease a Bike	+ 0"

General classification after Stage 5
Rank	Rider	Team	Time
1	Tadej Pogačar (SLO)	UAE Team Emirates XRG	11h 26' 01"
2	Primož Roglič (SLO)	Red Bull–Bora–Hansgrohe	+ 3' 21"
3	Enric Mas (ESP)	Movistar Team	+ 3' 32"
4	Sepp Kuss (USA)	Visma–Lease a Bike	+ 3' 44"
5	Oscar Onley (GBR)	Netcompany INEOS	+ 3' 45"
6	Richard Carapaz (ECU)	EF Education–EasyPost	+ 3' 50"
7	Felix Gall (AUT)	Decathlon CMA CGM	+ 3' 57"
8	Mattias Skjelmose (DEN)	Lidl–Trek	+ 4' 06"
9	Jarno Widar (BEL)	Lotto–Intermarché	+ 4' 06"
10	Jay Vine (AUS)	UAE Team Emirates XRG	+ 4' 11"

== Stage 6 ==
27 August 2026 – Alcossebre to Castellón, 176.8 km (109.9 mi)

Stage 6 Result
Rank	Rider	Team	Time
1	Tadej Pogačar (SLO)	UAE Team Emirates XRG	4h 12' 40"
2	Enric Mas (ESP)	Movistar Team	+ 0"
3	Ramses Debruyne (BEL)	Alpecin–Premier Tech	+ 46"
4	Richard Carapaz (ECU)	EF Education–EasyPost	+ 46"
5	Harold Tejada (COL)	XDS Astana Team	+ 46"
6	Felix Gall (AUT)	Decathlon CMA CGM	+ 46"
7	Primož Roglič (SLO)	Red Bull–Bora–Hansgrohe	+ 46"
8	Cristián Rodríguez (ESP)	XDS Astana Team	+ 1' 38"
9	Clément Berthet (FRA)	Groupama–FDJ United	+ 1' 38"
10	Mattias Skjelmose (DEN)	Lidl–Trek	+ 1' 38"

General classification after Stage 6
Rank	Rider	Team	Time
1	Tadej Pogačar (SLO)	UAE Team Emirates XRG	15h 38' 27"
2	Enric Mas (ESP)	Movistar Team	+ 3' 34"
3	Primož Roglič (SLO)	Red Bull–Bora–Hansgrohe	+ 4' 21"
4	Richard Carapaz (ECU)	EF Education–EasyPost	+ 4' 50"
5	Felix Gall (AUT)	Decathlon CMA CGM	+ 4' 55"
6	Sepp Kuss (USA)	Visma–Lease a Bike	+ 5' 36"
7	Oscar Onley (GBR)	Netcompany INEOS	+ 5' 37"
8	Ramses Debruyne (BEL)	Alpecin–Premier Tech	+ 5' 40"
9	Mattias Skjelmose (DEN)	Lidl–Trek	+ 5' 58"
10	Harold Tejada (COL)	XDS Astana Team	+ 6' 30"

== Stage 7 ==
28 August 2026 – Vall d'Alba to Aramón Valdelinares, 149.9 km (93.1 mi)

Andreas Leknessund won stage seven, leading a Norwegian one-two ahead of Tobias Halland Johannessen. The victory came on the same day as the death of King Harald V of Norway, with both Norwegian riders wearing black armbands in his memory. Tadej Pogačar extended his overall lead in the general classification.

Stage 7 Result
Rank	Rider	Team	Time
1	Andreas Leknessund (NOR)	Uno-X Mobility	3h 49' 47"
2	Tobias Halland Johannessen (NOR)	Uno-X Mobility	+ 34"
3	Wout van Aert (BEL)	Visma–Lease a Bike	+ 47"
4	Jakob Omrzel (SLO)	Team Bahrain Victorious	+ 58"
5	Juan Felipe Rodríguez (COL)	EF Education–EasyPost	+ 1' 13"
6	Iván Sosa (COL)	Equipo Kern Pharma	+ 1' 16"
7	Alexey Lutsenko (KAZ)	NSN Cycling Team	+ 1' 44"
8	Eddie Dunbar (IRL)	Pinarello–Q36.5 Pro Cycling Team	+ 1' 51"
9	Léo Bisiaux (FRA)	Decathlon CMA CGM	+ 1' 53"
10	Raúl García Pierna (ESP)	Movistar Team	+ 2' 14"

General classification after Stage 7
Rank	Rider	Team	Time
1	Tadej Pogačar (SLO)	UAE Team Emirates XRG	19h 32' 37"
2	Enric Mas (ESP)	Movistar Team	+ 3' 50"
3	Primož Roglič (SLO)	Red Bull–Bora–Hansgrohe	+ 4' 50"
4	Felix Gall (AUT)	Decathlon CMA CGM	+ 5' 01"
5	Sepp Kuss (USA)	Visma–Lease a Bike	+ 6' 05"
6	Oscar Onley (GBR)	Netcompany INEOS	+ 6' 06"
7	Richard Carapaz (ECU)	EF Education–EasyPost	+ 6' 12"
8	Mattias Skjelmose (DEN)	Lidl–Trek	+ 7' 17"
9	Harold Tejada (COL)	XDS Astana Team	+ 7' 46"
10	Gregor Mühlberger (AUT)	Decathlon CMA CGM	+ 9' 29"

== Stage 8 ==
29 August 2026 – Puçol to Xeraco, 176.4 km (109.6 mi)

Tadej Pogačar crashed after hitting a rock in the road about 33 km from the finish and was unable to continue, forcing him to abandon the race. He was later diagnosed with a fractured left clavicle and a C7 cervical fracture.

Stage 8 Result
Rank	Rider	Team	Time
1	Bryan Coquard (FRA)	Cofidis	3h 47' 06"
2	Mads Pedersen (DEN)	Lidl–Trek	+ 0"
3	Jordi Meeus (BEL)	Red Bull–Bora–Hansgrohe	+ 0"
4	Ben Turner (GBR)	Netcompany INEOS	+ 0"
5	Jordan Labrosse (FRA)	Decathlon CMA CGM	+ 0"
6	Alessandro Romele (ITA)	XDS Astana Team	+ 0"
7	Bastien Tronchon (FRA)	Groupama–FDJ United	+ 0"
8	Hugo Hofstetter (FRA)	NSN Cycling Team	+ 0"
9	Orluis Aular (VEN)	Movistar Team	+ 0"
10	Matthew Brennan (GBR)	Visma–Lease a Bike	+ 0"

General classification after Stage 8
Rank	Rider	Team	Time
1	Enric Mas (ESP)	Movistar Team	23h 23' 33"
2	Primož Roglič (SLO)	Red Bull–Bora–Hansgrohe	+ 1' 00"
3	Felix Gall (AUT)	Decathlon CMA CGM	+ 1' 11"
4	Sepp Kuss (USA)	Visma–Lease a Bike	+ 2' 15"
5	Oscar Onley (GBR)	Netcompany INEOS	+ 2' 16"
6	Richard Carapaz (ECU)	EF Education–EasyPost	+ 2' 22"
7	Mattias Skjelmose (DEN)	Lidl–Trek	+ 3' 27"
8	Harold Tejada (COL)	XDS Astana Team	+ 3' 56"
9	Gregor Mühlberger (AUT)	Decathlon CMA CGM	+ 5' 39"
10	Jakob Omrzel (SLO)	Team Bahrain Victorious	+ 6' 04"

== Stage 9 ==
30 August 2026 – Villajoyosa to Alto de Aitana, 187.5 km (116.5 mi)

Stage 9 Result
Rank	Rider	Team	Time
1	Enric Mas (ESP)	Movistar Team	5h 10' 40"
2	Oscar Onley (GBR)	Netcompany INEOS	+ 0"
3	Primož Roglič (SLO)	Red Bull–Bora–Hansgrohe	+ 12"
4	Felix Gall (AUT)	Decathlon CMA CGM	+ 18"
5	Cristián Rodríguez (ESP)	XDS Astana Team	+ 20"
6	Mattias Skjelmose (DEN)	Lidl–Trek	+ 20"
7	Jarno Widar (BEL)	Lotto–Intermarché	+ 25"
8	Harold Tejada (COL)	XDS Astana Team	+ 33"
9	Richard Carapaz (ECU)	EF Education–EasyPost	+ 54"
10	Santiago Buitrago (COL)	Team Bahrain Victorious	+ 1' 41"

General classification after Stage 9
Rank	Rider	Team	Time
1	Enric Mas (ESP)	Movistar Team	28h 34' 03"
2	Primož Roglič (SLO)	Red Bull–Bora–Hansgrohe	+ 1' 18"
3	Felix Gall (AUT)	Decathlon CMA CGM	+ 1' 39"
4	Oscar Onley (GBR)	Netcompany INEOS	+ 2' 20"
5	Richard Carapaz (ECU)	EF Education–EasyPost	+ 3' 26"
6	Mattias Skjelmose (DEN)	Lidl–Trek	+ 3' 55"
7	Sepp Kuss (USA)	Visma–Lease a Bike	+ 4' 09"
8	Harold Tejada (COL)	XDS Astana Team	+ 4' 39"
9	Gregor Mühlberger (AUT)	Decathlon CMA CGM	+ 7' 33"
10	Jakob Omrzel (SLO)	Team Bahrain Victorious	+ 8' 05"

== Rest day 1 ==
31 August 2026

== Stage 10 ==
1 September 2026 – Alcaraz to Elche de la Sierra, 184.5 km (114.6 mi)

Stage 10 Result
Rank	Rider	Team	Time
1	Bastien Tronchon (FRA)	Groupama–FDJ United	4h 07' 41"
2	Magnus Cort (DEN)	Uno-X Mobility	+ 0"
3	Thibau Nys (BEL)	Lidl–Trek	+ 0"
4	Wout van Aert (BEL)	Visma–Lease a Bike	+ 0"
5	Alessandro Romele (ITA)	XDS Astana Team	+ 0"
6	Xabier Azparren (ESP)	Pinarello–Q36.5 Pro Cycling Team	+ 0"
7	Finn Fisher-Black (NZL)	Red Bull–Bora–Hansgrohe	+ 0"
8	Orluis Aular (VEN)	Movistar Team	+ 0"
9	Jordan Labrosse (FRA)	Decathlon CMA CGM	+ 0"
10	Hugo Hofstetter (FRA)	NSN Cycling Team	+ 0"

General classification after Stage 10
Rank	Rider	Team	Time
1	Enric Mas (ESP)	Movistar Team	32h 41' 44"
2	Primož Roglič (SLO)	Red Bull–Bora–Hansgrohe	+ 1' 18"
3	Felix Gall (AUT)	Decathlon CMA CGM	+ 1' 39"
4	Oscar Onley (GBR)	Netcompany INEOS	+ 2' 20"
5	Richard Carapaz (ECU)	EF Education–EasyPost	+ 3' 26"
6	Mattias Skjelmose (DEN)	Lidl–Trek	+ 3' 55"
7	Sepp Kuss (USA)	Visma–Lease a Bike	+ 4' 09"
8	Harold Tejada (COL)	XDS Astana Team	+ 4' 39"
9	Gregor Mühlberger (AUT)	Decathlon CMA CGM	+ 7' 33"
10	Jakob Omrzel (SLO)	Team Bahrain Victorious	+ 8' 05"

== Stage 11 ==
2 September 2026 – Cartagena to Lorca, 156.1 km (97.0 mi)

Stage 11 Result
Rank	Rider	Team	Time
1	Matthew Brennan (GBR)	Visma–Lease a Bike	3h 17' 18"
2	Bryan Coquard (FRA)	Cofidis	+ 0"
3	Jordi Meeus (BEL)	Red Bull–Bora–Hansgrohe	+ 0"
4	Magnus Cort (DEN)	Uno-X Mobility	+ 0"
5	Wout van Aert (BEL)	Visma–Lease a Bike	+ 0"
6	Hugo Hofstetter (FRA)	NSN Cycling Team	+ 0"
7	Bastien Tronchon (FRA)	Groupama–FDJ United	+ 0"
8	Alessandro Romele (ITA)	XDS Astana Team	+ 0"
9	Matevž Govekar (SLO)	Team Bahrain Victorious	+ 0"
10	Orluis Aular (VEN)	Movistar Team	+ 0"

General classification after Stage 11
Rank	Rider	Team	Time
1	Enric Mas (ESP)	Movistar Team	35h 59' 02"
2	Primož Roglič (SLO)	Red Bull–Bora–Hansgrohe	+ 1' 18"
3	Felix Gall (AUT)	Decathlon CMA CGM	+ 1' 39"
4	Oscar Onley (GBR)	Netcompany INEOS	+ 2' 20"
5	Richard Carapaz (ECU)	EF Education–EasyPost	+ 3' 26"
6	Mattias Skjelmose (DEN)	Lidl–Trek	+ 3' 55"
7	Sepp Kuss (USA)	Visma–Lease a Bike	+ 4' 09"
8	Harold Tejada (COL)	XDS Astana Team	+ 4' 39"
9	Gregor Mühlberger (AUT)	Decathlon CMA CGM	+ 7' 33"
10	Jakob Omrzel (SLO)	Team Bahrain Victorious	+ 8' 05"
