= 2026 Vuelta a España, Stage 12 to Stage 21 =

Vuelta a España stages (cycling)

The 2026 Vuelta a España is a three-week cycling race which is taking place in Monaco, France, Andorra and Spain. It is the 81st edition of the Vuelta a España and the third and final grand tour of the 2026 men's road cycling season. It started on 22 August in Monaco, and will finish on 13 September in Granada.

== Classification standings ==
Legend
Denotes the leader of the general classification	Denotes the leader of the young rider classification
Denotes the leader of the points classification	Denotes the leader of the team classification
Denotes the leader of the mountains classification	Denotes the winner of the combativity award

== Stage 12 ==
3 September 2026 – Vera to Calar Alto, 166.5 km (103.5 mi)

Stage 12 Result
Rank	Rider	Team	Time
1	Jakob Omrzel (SLO)	Team Bahrain Victorious	4h 29' 53"
2	Urko Berrade (ESP)	Equipo Kern Pharma	+ 1' 56"
3	Santiago Buitrago (COL)	Team Bahrain Victorious	+ 2' 13"
4	Alexey Lutsenko (KAZ)	NSN Cycling Team	+ 2' 49"
5	Mauri Vansevenant (BEL)	Soudal–Quick-Step	+ 2' 53"
6	Enric Mas (ESP)	Movistar Team	+ 2' 56"
7	Felix Gall (AUT)	Decathlon CMA CGM	+ 3' 23"
8	Primož Roglič (SLO)	Red Bull–Bora–Hansgrohe	+ 3' 23"
9	Richard Carapaz (ECU)	EF Education–EasyPost	+ 3' 23"
10	Gregor Mühlberger (AUT)	Decathlon CMA CGM	+ 3' 50"

General classification after Stage 12
Rank	Rider	Team	Time
1	Enric Mas (ESP)	Movistar Team	40h 31' 51"
2	Primož Roglič (SLO)	Red Bull–Bora–Hansgrohe	+ 1' 45"
3	Felix Gall (AUT)	Decathlon CMA CGM	+ 2' 06"
4	Richard Carapaz (ECU)	EF Education–EasyPost	+ 3' 53"
5	Oscar Onley (GBR)	Netcompany INEOS	+ 4' 29"
6	Jakob Omrzel (SLO)	Team Bahrain Victorious	+ 4' 59"
7	Mattias Skjelmose (DEN)	Lidl–Trek	+ 7' 24"
8	Sepp Kuss (USA)	Visma–Lease a Bike	+ 7' 58"
9	Gregor Mühlberger (AUT)	Decathlon CMA CGM	+ 8' 27"
10	Harold Tejada (COL)	XDS Astana Team	+ 8' 33"

== Stage 13 ==
4 September 2026 – Almuñécar to Loja, 193.2 km (120.0 mi)

Stage 13 Result
Rank	Rider	Team	Time
1	Wout van Aert (BEL)	Visma–Lease a Bike	4h 34' 00"
2	Valentin Paret-Peintre (FRA)	Soudal–Quick-Step	+ 0"
3	Matthew Brennan (GBR)	Visma–Lease a Bike	+ 24"
4	Jarno Widar (BEL)	Lotto–Intermarché	+ 24"
5	Vincenzo Albanese (ITA)	EF Education–EasyPost	+ 24"
6	Finn Fisher-Black (NZL)	Red Bull–Bora–Hansgrohe	+ 24"
7	Kevin Vermaerke (USA)	UAE Team Emirates XRG	+ 24"
8	Léo Bisiaux (FRA)	Decathlon CMA CGM	+ 24"
9	Simon Dalby (DEN)	Uno-X Mobility	+ 32"
10	Filippo Zana (ITA)	Soudal–Quick-Step	+ 45"

General classification after Stage 13
Rank	Rider	Team	Time
1	Enric Mas (ESP)	Movistar Team	45h 08' 51"
2	Primož Roglič (SLO)	Red Bull–Bora–Hansgrohe	+ 1' 45"
3	Felix Gall (AUT)	Decathlon CMA CGM	+ 2' 06"
4	Richard Carapaz (ECU)	EF Education–EasyPost	+ 3' 53"
5	Oscar Onley (GBR)	Netcompany INEOS	+ 4' 29"
6	Jakob Omrzel (SLO)	Team Bahrain Victorious	+ 4' 59"
7	Mattias Skjelmose (DEN)	Lidl–Trek	+ 5' 32"
8	Sepp Kuss (USA)	Visma–Lease a Bike	+ 7' 58"
9	Harold Tejada (COL)	XDS Astana Team	+ 8' 33"
10	Clément Berthet (FRA)	Groupama–FDJ United	+ 11' 06"

== Stage 14 ==
5 September 2026 – Jaén to Sierra de la Pandera, 154.5 km (96.0 mi)

Stage 14 Result
Rank	Rider	Team	Time
1	Marco Brenner (GER)	Tudor Pro Cycling Team	4h 15' 09"
2	Santiago Buitrago (COL)	Team Bahrain Victorious	+ 1"
3	Cristián Rodríguez (ESP)	XDS Astana Team	+ 11"
4	Iván Sosa (COL)	Equipo Kern Pharma	+ 14"
5	Valentin Paret-Peintre (FRA)	Soudal–Quick-Step	+ 22"
6	Clément Berthet (FRA)	Groupama–FDJ United	+ 27"
7	Jørgen Nordhagen (NOR)	Visma–Lease a Bike	+ 39"
8	Filippo Zana (ITA)	Soudal–Quick-Step	+ 43"
9	Walter Calzoni (ITA)	Pinarello–Q36.5 Pro Cycling Team	+ 1' 06"
10	João Almeida (POR)	UAE Team Emirates XRG	+ 1' 09"

General classification after Stage 14
Rank	Rider	Team	Time
1	Enric Mas (ESP)	Movistar Team	49h 28' 12"
2	Felix Gall (AUT)	Decathlon CMA CGM	+ 2' 06"
3	Primož Roglič (SLO)	Red Bull–Bora–Hansgrohe	+ 2' 10"
4	Richard Carapaz (ECU)	EF Education–EasyPost	+ 4' 24"
5	Oscar Onley (GBR)	Netcompany INEOS	+ 5' 44"
6	Jakob Omrzel (SLO)	Team Bahrain Victorious	+ 6' 14"
7	Mattias Skjelmose (DEN)	Lidl–Trek	+ 6' 49"
8	Cristián Rodríguez (ESP)	XDS Astana Team	+ 7' 01"
9	Clément Berthet (FRA)	Groupama–FDJ United	+ 7' 19"
10	Sepp Kuss (USA)	Visma–Lease a Bike	+ 8' 55"

== Stage 15 ==
6 September 2026 – Palma del Río to Córdoba, 110.2 km (68.5 mi)

Stage 15 Result
Rank	Rider	Team	Time
1	Wout van Aert (BEL)	Visma–Lease a Bike	2h 35' 00"
2	Alessandro Romele (ITA)	XDS Astana Team	+ 0"
3	Thibau Nys (BEL)	Lidl–Trek	+ 0"
4	Ramses Debruyne (BEL)	Alpecin–Premier Tech	+ 2"
5	Andreas Leknessund (NOR)	Uno-X Mobility	+ 2"
6	Alessandro Covi (ITA)	Team Jayco–AlUla	+ 58"
7	Bastien Tronchon (FRA)	Groupama–FDJ United	+ 58"
8	Henok Mulubrhan (ERI)	XDS Astana Team	+ 58"
9	Stefan Küng (SUI)	Tudor Pro Cycling Team	+ 58"
10	Ivo Oliveira (POR)	UAE Team Emirates XRG	+ 58"

General classification after Stage 15
Rank	Rider	Team	Time
1	Enric Mas (ESP)	Movistar Team	52h 05' 56"
2	Felix Gall (AUT)	Decathlon CMA CGM	+ 2' 06"
3	Primož Roglič (SLO)	Red Bull–Bora–Hansgrohe	+ 2' 10"
4	Richard Carapaz (ECU)	EF Education–EasyPost	+ 4' 24"
5	Oscar Onley (GBR)	Netcompany INEOS	+ 5' 44"
6	Jakob Omrzel (SLO)	Team Bahrain Victorious	+ 6' 14"
7	Mattias Skjelmose (DEN)	Lidl–Trek	+ 6' 49"
8	Cristián Rodríguez (ESP)	XDS Astana Team	+ 7' 01"
9	Clément Berthet (FRA)	Groupama–FDJ United	+ 7' 19"
10	Sepp Kuss (USA)	Visma–Lease a Bike	+ 8' 55"

== Rest day 2 ==
7 September 2026

== Stage 16 ==
8 September 2026 – Cortegana to Palos de la Frontera, 186 km (116 mi)

Stage 16 Result
Rank	Rider	Team	Time
1	Matthew Brennan (GBR)	Visma–Lease a Bike	3h 56' 33"
2	Bryan Coquard (FRA)	Cofidis	+ 0"
3	Vito Braet (BEL)	Lotto–Intermarché	+ 0"
4	Jordi Meeus (BEL)	Red Bull–Bora–Hansgrohe	+ 0"
5	Magnus Cort (DEN)	Uno-X Mobility	+ 0"
6	Wout van Aert (BEL)	Visma–Lease a Bike	+ 0"
7	Hugo Hofstetter (FRA)	NSN Cycling Team	+ 0"
8	Vincenzo Albanese (ITA)	EF Education–EasyPost	+ 0"
9	Alberto Dainese (ITA)	Soudal–Quick-Step	+ 0"
10	César Macías (MEX)	Burgos Burpellet BH	+ 0"

General classification after Stage 16
Rank	Rider	Team	Time
1	Enric Mas (ESP)	Movistar Team	56h 02' 29"
2	Felix Gall (AUT)	Decathlon CMA CGM	+ 2' 06"
3	Primož Roglič (SLO)	Red Bull–Bora–Hansgrohe	+ 2' 10"
4	Richard Carapaz (ECU)	EF Education–EasyPost	+ 4' 24"
5	Oscar Onley (GBR)	Netcompany INEOS	+ 5' 44"
6	Jakob Omrzel (SLO)	Team Bahrain Victorious	+ 6' 14"
7	Mattias Skjelmose (DEN)	Lidl–Trek	+ 6' 49"
8	Cristián Rodríguez (ESP)	XDS Astana Team	+ 7' 01"
9	Clément Berthet (FRA)	Groupama–FDJ United	+ 7' 19"
10	Sepp Kuss (USA)	Visma–Lease a Bike	+ 8' 55"

== Stage 17 ==
9 September 2026 – Dos Hermanas to Seville, 189.2 km (117.6 mi)

Stage 17 Result
Rank	Rider	Team	Time
1	Matthew Brennan (GBR)	Visma–Lease a Bike	4h 07' 15"
2	Jordi Meeus (BEL)	Red Bull–Bora–Hansgrohe	+ 0"
3	Magnus Cort (DEN)	Uno-X Mobility	+ 0"
4	Alessandro Romele (ITA)	XDS Astana Team	+ 0"
5	Steffen De Schuyteneer (BEL)	Lotto–Intermarché	+ 0"
6	Axel Laurance (FRA)	Netcompany INEOS	+ 0"
7	Pau Miquel (ESP)	Team Bahrain Victorious	+ 0"
8	César Macías (MEX)	Burgos Burpellet BH	+ 0"
9	Hugo Hofstetter (FRA)	NSN Cycling Team	+ 0"
10	Bryan Coquard (FRA)	Cofidis	+ 0"

General classification after Stage 17
Rank	Rider	Team	Time
1	Enric Mas (ESP)	Movistar Team	60h 09' 44"
2	Felix Gall (AUT)	Decathlon CMA CGM	+ 2' 06"
3	Primož Roglič (SLO)	Red Bull–Bora–Hansgrohe	+ 2' 10"
4	Richard Carapaz (ECU)	EF Education–EasyPost	+ 4' 24"
5	Oscar Onley (GBR)	Netcompany INEOS	+ 5' 44"
6	Jakob Omrzel (SLO)	Team Bahrain Victorious	+ 6' 14"
7	Mattias Skjelmose (DEN)	Lidl–Trek	+ 6' 49"
8	Cristián Rodríguez (ESP)	XDS Astana Team	+ 7' 01"
9	Clément Berthet (FRA)	Groupama–FDJ United	+ 7' 19"
10	Sepp Kuss (USA)	Visma–Lease a Bike	+ 8' 55"

== Stage 18 ==
10 September 2026 – El Puerto de Santa María to Jerez de la Frontera, 32.5 km (20.2 mi) (ITT)

Stage 18 Result
Rank	Rider	Team	Time
1	Stefan Küng (SUI)	Tudor Pro Cycling Team	35' 22"
2	Callum Thornley (GBR)	Red Bull–Bora–Hansgrohe	+ 3"
3	João Almeida (POR)	UAE Team Emirates XRG	+ 9"
4	Primož Roglič (SLO)	Red Bull–Bora–Hansgrohe	+ 19"
5	Wout van Aert (BEL)	Visma–Lease a Bike	+ 20"
6	Finn Fisher-Black (NZL)	Red Bull–Bora–Hansgrohe	+ 21"
7	Bruno Armirail (FRA)	Visma–Lease a Bike	+ 26"
8	Ivo Oliveira (POR)	UAE Team Emirates XRG	+ 30"
9	Ethan Hayter (GBR)	Soudal–Quick-Step	+ 32"
10	Xabier Azparren (ESP)	Pinarello–Q36.5 Pro Cycling Team	+ 33"

General classification after Stage 18
Rank	Rider	Team	Time
1	Enric Mas (ESP)	Movistar Team	60h 45' 58"
2	Primož Roglič (SLO)	Red Bull–Bora–Hansgrohe	+ 1' 37"
3	Felix Gall (AUT)	Decathlon CMA CGM	+ 3' 01"
4	Richard Carapaz (ECU)	EF Education–EasyPost	+ 5' 17"
5	Oscar Onley (GBR)	Netcompany INEOS	+ 6' 03"
6	Jakob Omrzel (SLO)	Team Bahrain Victorious	+ 7' 00"
7	Clément Berthet (FRA)	Groupama–FDJ United	+ 7' 47"
8	Mattias Skjelmose (DEN)	Lidl–Trek	+ 7' 51"
9	Cristián Rodríguez (ESP)	XDS Astana Team	+ 7' 51"
10	Harold Tejada (COL)	XDS Astana Team	+ 9' 57"

== Stage 19 ==
11 September 2026 – Vélez-Málaga to Peñas Blancas, 205.1 km (127.4 mi)

Stage 19 Result
Rank	Rider	Team	Time
1	Eddie Dunbar (IRL)	Pinarello–Q36.5 Pro Cycling Team	5h 00' 54"
2	Santiago Buitrago (COL)	Team Bahrain Victorious	+ 14"
3	Thomas Gloag (GBR)	Pinarello–Q36.5 Pro Cycling Team	+ 23"
4	Urko Berrade (ESP)	Equipo Kern Pharma	+ 44"
5	Marcel Camprubí (ESP)	Pinarello–Q36.5 Pro Cycling Team	+ 1' 44"
6	Andreas Leknessund (NOR)	Uno-X Mobility	+ 2' 01"
7	Guillaume Martin (FRA)	Groupama–FDJ United	+ 2' 11"
8	Chris Hamilton (AUS)	Team Picnic–PostNL	+ 2' 39"
9	Kevin Vermaerke (USA)	UAE Team Emirates XRG	+ 3' 03"
10	Sergio Samitier (ESP)	Cofidis	+ 3' 17"

General classification after Stage 19
Rank	Rider	Team	Time
1	Enric Mas (ESP)	Movistar Team	65h 52' 03"
2	Primož Roglič (SLO)	Red Bull–Bora–Hansgrohe	+ 1' 37"
3	Felix Gall (AUT)	Decathlon CMA CGM	+ 3' 01"
4	Richard Carapaz (ECU)	EF Education–EasyPost	+ 5' 17"
5	Oscar Onley (GBR)	Netcompany INEOS	+ 6' 03"
6	Jakob Omrzel (SLO)	Team Bahrain Victorious	+ 7' 06"
7	Clément Berthet (FRA)	Groupama–FDJ United	+ 7' 57"
8	Cristián Rodríguez (ESP)	XDS Astana Team	+ 8' 21"
9	Mattias Skjelmose (DEN)	Lidl–Trek	+ 9' 06"
10	Harold Tejada (COL)	XDS Astana Team	+ 10' 27"

== Stage 20 ==
12 September 2026 – La Calahorra to Collado del Alguacil, 187 km (116 mi)

Stage 20 Result
Rank	Rider	Team	Time
1	Mikel Landa (ESP)	Soudal–Quick-Step	4h 58' 01"
2	Tobias Halland Johannessen (NOR)	Uno-X Mobility	+ 47"
3	Ramses Debruyne (BEL)	Alpecin–Premier Tech	+ 1' 27"
4	Pau Miquel (ESP)	Team Bahrain Victorious	+ 3' 00"
5	Urko Berrade (ESP)	Equipo Kern Pharma	+ 4' 12"
6	Jan Hirt (CZE)	NSN Cycling Team	+ 4' 18"
7	Jørgen Nordhagen (NOR)	Visma–Lease a Bike	+ 4' 35"
8	Sepp Kuss (USA)	Visma–Lease a Bike	+ 4' 35"
9	Walter Calzoni (ITA)	Pinarello–Q36.5 Pro Cycling Team	+ 4' 48"
10	Lorenzo Fortunato (ITA)	XDS Astana Team	+ 4' 53"

General classification after Stage 20
Rank	Rider	Team	Time
1	Enric Mas (ESP)	Movistar Team	70h 56' 58"
2	Primož Roglič (SLO)	Red Bull–Bora–Hansgrohe	+ 2' 15"
3	Felix Gall (AUT)	Decathlon CMA CGM	+ 2' 44"
4	Richard Carapaz (ECU)	EF Education–EasyPost	+ 6' 54"
5	Sepp Kuss (USA)	Visma–Lease a Bike	+ 8' 45"
6	Oscar Onley (GBR)	Netcompany INEOS	+ 9' 28"
7	Jakob Omrzel (SLO)	Team Bahrain Victorious	+ 10' 38"
8	Clément Berthet (FRA)	Groupama–FDJ United	+ 11' 41"
9	Cristián Rodríguez (ESP)	XDS Astana Team	+ 11' 59"
10	Harold Tejada (COL)	XDS Astana Team	+ 14' 40"

== Stage 21 ==
13 September 2026 – Granada to Granada, 99.4 km (61.8 mi)

Stage 21 Result
Rank	Rider	Team	Time
1	Tobias Halland Johannessen (NOR)	Uno-X Mobility	2h 54' 08"
2	Alessandro Romele (ITA)	XDS Astana Team	+ 0"
3	Ramses Debruyne (BEL)	Alpecin–Premier Tech	+ 0"
4	Matthew Brennan (GBR)	Visma–Lease a Bike	+ 0"
5	Bastien Tronchon (FRA)	Groupama–FDJ United	+ 0"
6	Pello Bilbao (ESP)	Team Bahrain Victorious	+ 0"
7	Finn Fisher-Black (NZL)	Red Bull–Bora–Hansgrohe	+ 0"
8	Axel Laurance (FRA)	Netcompany INEOS	+ 0"
9	Pau Martí (ESP)	NSN Cycling Team	+ 0"
10	Marco Brenner (GER)	Tudor Pro Cycling Team	+ 0"

General classification after stage 21
Rank	Rider	Team	Time
1	Enric Mas (ESP)	Movistar Team	73h 52' 55"
2	Primož Roglič (SLO)	Red Bull–Bora–Hansgrohe	+ 2' 15"
3	Felix Gall (AUT)	Decathlon CMA CGM	+ 2' 44"
4	Richard Carapaz (ECU)	EF Education–EasyPost	+ 6' 54"
5	Sepp Kuss (USA)	Visma–Lease a Bike	+ 8' 45"
6	Oscar Onley (GBR)	Netcompany INEOS	+ 9' 28"
7	Jakob Omrzel (SLO)	Team Bahrain Victorious	+ 10' 38"
8	Clément Berthet (FRA)	Groupama–FDJ United	+ 11' 41"
9	Cristián Rodríguez (ESP)	XDS Astana Team	+ 11' 59"
10	Harold Tejada (COL)	XDS Astana Team	+ 12' 51"
