= 2026 Vuelta a España =

80th edition of the Vuelta a España

2026 UCI World Tour, race 31 of 36
- Enric Mas and the riders during stage 9

Race details
- Dates: 22 August – 13 September
- Stages: 21
- Distance: 3,310.6 km (2,057.1 mi)
- Winning time: 73h 52' 55"

Results
Jersey awarded to the overall winner	Winner	Enric Mas (ESP)	(Movistar Team)
	Second	Primož Roglič (SLO)	(Red Bull–Bora–Hansgrohe)
	Third	Felix Gall (AUT)	(Decathlon CMA CGM)
Jersey awarded to the points classification winner	Points	Wout van Aert (BEL)	(Visma–Lease a Bike)
Jersey awarded to the mountains classification winner	Mountains	Santiago Buitrago (COL)	(Team Bahrain Victorious)
Jersey awarded to the young rider classification winner	Young rider	Oscar Onley (GBR)	(Netcompany INEOS)
Jersey awarded to the combativity classification winner	Combativity	Wout van Aert (BEL)	(Visma–Lease a Bike)
Jersey awarded to the team classification winner	Team	(France) Decathlon CMA CGM	

The 2026 Vuelta a España was a three-week cycling race taking place in Monaco, France, Andorra and Spain. It started on 22 August in Monaco and finished on 13 September in Granada. It is the 81st edition of the Vuelta a España and the third and final grand tour of the 2026 men's road cycling season.

The general classification was won by Enric Mas of Movistar Team. Although Tadej Pogačar (UAE Team Emirates XRG) was widely expected to win the GC, and won three of the first six stages, he was injured in a crash on the eighth stage and forced to withdraw from the race. Mas, who was in second place when Pogačar crashed, inherited the red jersey, won the ninth stage, and defended his lead until the end of the Vuelta.

The points classification was won by Wout van Aert (Visma–Lease a Bike}, who also won two stages and the overall combativity award. Van Aert's teammate Matthew Brennan won five stages, more than any other competitor. Santiago Buitrago (Team Bahrain Victorious) won the mountains classification, and Oscar Onley (Netcompany INEOS), placing sixth in the overall GC standings, won the young rider classification.

== Teams ==
Twenty-three teams took part in the race. All eighteen UCI WorldTeams were automatically invited. They were joined by five UCI ProTeams; the three highest ranked UCI ProTeams in 2025 (Tudor Pro Cycling Team, Pinarello–Q36.5 Pro Cycling Team and Cofidis), along with two other Spanish teams (Burgos Burpellet BH and Equipo Kern Pharma). The teams were announced on 30 January 2026.

=== UCI WorldTeams ===
- Alpecin–Premier Tech
- Decathlon CMA CGM
- EF Education–EasyPost
- Groupama–FDJ United
- Lidl–Trek
- Lotto–Intermarché
- Movistar Team
- Netcompany INEOS
- NSN Cycling Team
- Red Bull–Bora–Hansgrohe
- Soudal–Quick-Step
- Team Bahrain Victorious
- Team Jayco–AlUla
- Team Picnic–PostNL
- UAE Team Emirates XRG
- Uno-X Mobility
- Visma–Lease a Bike
- XDS Astana Team

=== UCI ProTeams ===
- Burgos Burpellet BH
- Cofidis
- Equipo Kern Pharma
- Pinarello–Q36.5 Pro Cycling Team
- Tudor Pro Cycling Team

== Pre-race favourites ==
Five-time Tour de France champion Tadej Pogačar (UAE Team Emirates) arrived to the Vuelta regarded as the presumptive winner of the race, but retired from the race after crashing during the eighth stage. The Slovenian held a big lead in the race but got caught in a crash near the end of the stage. He tried to rejoin the race but was unable to due to severe injuries to his clavicle and spine, and was taken by ambulance to hospital. Race organizers confirmed he pulled out of the race. Other contenders for the general classification included Felix Gall and Richard Carapaz, as well as 4-time winner Primož Roglič, despite having been hit by a car during training just 3 weeks before the start. In the competition for the green jersey, Mads Pedersen and Wout van Aert were considered the favourites.

== Route and stages ==
The official route was announced on 17 December 2025 in Monaco.

Stage characteristics and winners
Stage	Date	Course	Distance	Type	Winner
1	22 August	Monaco to Monaco	9 km (5.6 mi)	Individual time trial	Tadej Pogačar (SLO)
2	23 August	Monaco to Manosque (France)	215.5 km (133.9 mi)	Hilly stage	Matthew Brennan (GBR)
3	24 August	Gruissan (France) to Font Romeu (France)	166.7 km (103.6 mi)	Medium-mountain stage	Stage cancelled (Note: The stage was cancelled due to the weather conditions making it impossible to continue to Font-Romeu.)
4	25 August	Andorra la Vella (Andorra) to Andorra la Vella (Andorra)	104.9 km (65.2 mi)	Mountain stage	Tadej Pogačar (SLO)
5	26 August	Falset to Roquetes	171.1 km (106.3 mi)	Hilly stage	Matthew Brennan (GBR)
6	27 August	Alcossebre to Castellón	176.8 km (109.9 mi)	Medium-mountain stage	Tadej Pogačar (SLO)
7	28 August	Vall d'Alba to Aramón Valdelinares	149.9 km (93.1 mi)	Mountain stage	Andreas Leknessund (NOR)
8	29 August	Puçol to Xeraco	176.4 km (109.6 mi)	Flat stage	Bryan Coquard (FRA)
9	30 August	Villajoyosa to Alto de Aitana	187.5 km (116.5 mi)	Mountain stage	Enric Mas (ESP)
	31 August	Rest day			
10	1 September	Alcaraz to Elche de la Sierra	184.5 km (114.6 mi)	Hilly stage	Bastien Tronchon (FRA)
11	2 September	Cartagena to Lorca	156.1 km (97.0 mi)	Flat stage	Matthew Brennan (GBR)
12	3 September	Vera to Calar Alto	166.5 km (103.5 mi)	Mountain stage	Jakob Omrzel (SLO)
13	4 September	Almuñécar to Loja	193.2 km (120.0 mi)	Medium-mountain stage	Wout van Aert (BEL)
14	5 September	Jaén to Sierra de la Pandera	152.7 km (94.9 mi)	Mountain stage	Marco Brenner (GER)
15	6 September	Palma del Río to Córdoba	110.2 km (68.5 mi)	Medium-mountain stage	Wout Van Aert (BEL)
	7 September	Rest day			
16	8 September	Cortegana to Palos de la Frontera	186 km (116 mi)	Flat stage	Matthew Brennan (GBR)
17	9 September	Dos Hermanas to Seville	189.2 km (117.6 mi)	Flat stage	Matthew Brennan (GBR)
18	10 September	El Puerto de Santa María to Jerez de la Frontera	32.5 km (20.2 mi)	Individual time trial	Stefan Küng (SUI)
19	11 September	Vélez-Málaga to Peñas Blancas	205.1 km (127.4 mi)	Hilly stage	Eddie Dunbar (IRL)
20	12 September	La Calahorra to Collado del Alguacil	187 km (116 mi)	Mountain stage	Mikel Landa (ESP)
21	13 September	Granada to Granada	99.4 km (61.8 mi)	Flat stage	Tobias Halland Johannessen (NOR)
Total			3,310.6 km (2,057.1 mi)		

== Classification leadership ==
Classification leadership by stage
Stage	Winner	General classification	Points classification	Mountains classification	Young rider classification	Team classification	Combativity award
1	Tadej Pogačar	Tadej Pogačar	Tadej Pogačar (Note: On stages 2–5, Ethan Hayter who was second in the points classification, wore the green jersey, because first placed Tadej Pogačar wore the red jersey as the leader of the general classification. On stage 6, Matthew Brennan wore the green jersey for the same reason. On stage 7, Wout van Aert wore the green jersey for the same reason.)	Callum Thornley (Note: Although there were no points awarded towards the mountains classification during the individual time trial, the first polka dot jersey was awarded to the highest-placed rider who is not leading a classification.)	Joshua Tarling	UAE Team Emirates XRG	no award
2	Matthew Brennan	Tadej Pogačar	Tadej Pogačar	Koen Bouwman	Matthew Brennan	UAE Team Emirates XRG	Ethan Hayter
3	Stage cancelled	Tadej Pogačar	Tadej Pogačar	Koen Bouwman	Matthew Brennan	UAE Team Emirates XRG	no award
4	Tadej Pogačar	Tadej Pogačar	Tadej Pogačar	Tadej Pogačar (Note: On stages 5 and 6 Lorenzo Fortunato who was second in the mountains classification, wore the polka dot jersey, because first placed Tadej Pogačar wore the red jersey as the leader of the general classification. On stage 7, Enric Mas wore the polka dot jersey for the same reason. On stage 8, Andreas Leknessund wore the polka dot jersey for the same reason.)	Oscar Onley	UAE Team Emirates XRG	Tadej Pogačar
5	Matthew Brennan	Tadej Pogačar	Tadej Pogačar	Tadej Pogačar	Oscar Onley	UAE Team Emirates XRG	Ethan Hayter
6	Tadej Pogačar	Tadej Pogačar	Tadej Pogačar	Tadej Pogačar	Oscar Onley	Decathlon CMA CGM	Tadej Pogačar
7	Andreas Leknessund	Tadej Pogačar	Wout van Aert	Tadej Pogačar	Oscar Onley	Decathlon CMA CGM	Wout van Aert
8	Bryan Coquard	Enric Mas	Wout van Aert	Andreas Leknessund	Oscar Onley	Decathlon CMA CGM	Sinuhé Fernández
9	Enric Mas	Enric Mas	Wout van Aert	Santiago Buitrago	Oscar Onley	Decathlon CMA CGM	Pavel Sivakov
10	Bastien Tronchon	Enric Mas	Wout van Aert	Santiago Buitrago	Oscar Onley	Decathlon CMA CGM	Michael Gogl
11	Matthew Brennan	Enric Mas	Wout van Aert	Santiago Buitrago	Oscar Onley	Decathlon CMA CGM	Ethan Hayter
12	Jakob Omrzel	Enric Mas	Wout van Aert	Santiago Buitrago	Oscar Onley	Decathlon CMA CGM	Wout van Aert
13	Wout van Aert	Enric Mas	Wout van Aert	Santiago Buitrago	Oscar Onley	Decathlon CMA CGM	Andreas Kron
14	Marco Brenner	Enric Mas	Wout van Aert	Santiago Buitrago	Oscar Onley	Decathlon CMA CGM	Kevin Vermaerke
15	Wout van Aert	Enric Mas	Wout van Aert	Santiago Buitrago	Oscar Onley	Decathlon CMA CGM	Andreas Leknessund
16	Matthew Brennan	Enric Mas	Wout van Aert	Santiago Buitrago	Oscar Onley	Decathlon CMA CGM	Kevin Vermaerke
17	Matthew Brennan	Enric Mas	Wout van Aert	Santiago Buitrago	Oscar Onley	Decathlon CMA CGM	Enzo Paleni
18	Stefan Küng	Enric Mas	Wout van Aert	Santiago Buitrago	Oscar Onley	Decathlon CMA CGM	no award
19	Eddie Dunbar	Enric Mas	Wout van Aert	Santiago Buitrago	Oscar Onley	Decathlon CMA CGM	Eddie Dunbar
20	Mikel Landa	Enric Mas	Wout van Aert	Santiago Buitrago	Oscar Onley	Decathlon CMA CGM	Tobias Halland Johannessen
21	Tobias Halland Johannessen	Enric Mas	Wout van Aert	Santiago Buitrago	Oscar Onley	Decathlon CMA CGM	no award
Final		Enric Mas	Wout van Aert	Santiago Buitrago	Oscar Onley	Decathlon CMA CGM	Wout van Aert

== Classification standings ==
Legend
Denotes the leader of the general classification	Denotes the leader of the young rider classification
Denotes the leader of the points classification	Denotes the leader of the team classification
Denotes the leader of the mountains classification	Denotes the winner of the combativity award

=== General classification ===
Final general classification (1–10)
Rank	Rider	Team	Time
1	Enric Mas (ESP)	Movistar Team	73h 52' 55"
2	Primož Roglič (SLO)	Red Bull–Bora–Hansgrohe	+ 2' 15"
3	Felix Gall (AUT)	Decathlon CMA CGM	+ 2' 44"
4	Richard Carapaz (ECU)	EF Education–EasyPost	+ 6' 54"
5	Sepp Kuss (USA)	Visma–Lease a Bike	+ 8' 45"
6	Oscar Onley (GBR)	Netcompany INEOS	+ 9' 28"
7	Jakob Omrzel (SLO)	Team Bahrain Victorious	+ 10' 38"
8	Clément Berthet (FRA)	Groupama–FDJ United	+ 11' 41"
9	Cristián Rodríguez (ESP)	XDS Astana Team	+ 11' 59"
10	Harold Tejada (COL)	XDS Astana Team	+ 12' 51"

Final general classification (11–142)
Rank	Rider	Team	Time
11	Guillaume Martin (FRA)	Groupama–FDJ United	+ 20' 14"
12	Léo Bisiaux (FRA)	Decathlon CMA CGM	+ 25' 03"
13	Mattias Skjelmose (DEN)	Lidl–Trek	+ 25' 43"
14	Mario Aparicio (ESP)	Burgos Burpellet BH	+ 42' 17"
15	Jan Hirt (CZE)	NSN Cycling Team	+ 43' 20"
16	Juan Felipe Rodríguez (COL)	EF Education–EasyPost	+ 47' 56"
17	Santiago Buitrago (COL)	Team Bahrain Victorious	+ 50' 56"
18	Filippo Zana (ITA)	Soudal–Quick-Step	+ 58' 44"
19	Urko Berrade (ESP)	Equipo Kern Pharma	+ 1h 01' 09"
20	Embret Svestad-Bårdseng (NOR)	Netcompany INEOS	+ 1h 10' 46"
21	Koen Bouwman (NED)	Team Jayco–AlUla	+ 1h 14' 26"
22	Raúl García Pierna (ESP)	Movistar Team	+ 1h 16' 45"
23	Jarno Widar (BEL)	Lotto–Intermarché	+ 1h 18' 52"
24	Jack Haig (AUS)	Netcompany INEOS	+ 1h 21' 35"
25	Emanuel Buchmann (GER)	Cofidis	+ 1h 24' 50"
26	Tobias Halland Johannessen (NOR)	Uno-X Mobility	+ 1h 26' 03"
27	Gijs Leemreize (NED)	Team Picnic–PostNL	+ 1h 26' 27"
28	Finlay Pickering (GBR)	Team Jayco–AlUla	+ 1h 29' 10"
29	Kevin Vermaerke (USA)	UAE Team Emirates XRG	+ 1h 31' 49"
30	Mikel Landa (ESP)	Soudal–Quick-Step	+ 1h 36' 39"
31	José Manuel Díaz (ESP)	Burgos Burpellet BH	+ 1h 44' 33"
32	Ramses Debruyne (BEL)	Alpecin–Premier Tech	+ 1h 50' 31"
33	Pello Bilbao (ESP)	Team Bahrain Victorious	+ 1h 54' 02"
34	Valentin Paret-Peintre (FRA)	Soudal–Quick-Step	+ 1h 56' 41"
35	Valentin Madouas (FRA)	Groupama–FDJ United	+ 1h 56' 47"
36	Carlos Rodríguez (ESP)	Netcompany INEOS	+ 1h 57' 52"
37	Jørgen Nordhagen (NOR)	Visma–Lease a Bike	+ 2h 00' 41"
38	Callum Scotson (AUS)	Decathlon CMA CGM	+ 2h 03' 02"
39	Lorenzo Fortunato (ITA)	XDS Astana Team	+ 2h 07' 42"
40	Patrick Konrad (AUT)	Lidl–Trek	+ 2h 08' 19"
41	Larry Warbasse (USA)	Tudor Pro Cycling Team	+ 2h 10' 02"
42	Pau Miquel (ESP)	Team Bahrain Victorious	+ 2h 13' 01"
43	Henok Mulubrhan (ERI)	XDS Astana Team	+ 2h 14' 30"
44	Wout van Aert (BEL)	Visma–Lease a Bike	+ 2h 15' 35"
45	Attila Valter (HUN)	Team Bahrain Victorious	+ 2h 18' 39"
46	Luke Tuckwell (AUS)	Red Bull–Bora–Hansgrohe	+ 2h 23' 51"
47	Milan Vader (NED)	Pinarello–Q36.5 Pro Cycling Team	+ 2h 28' 23"
48	Hannes Wilksch (GER)	Tudor Pro Cycling Team	+ 2h 28' 27"
49	Julien Bernard (FRA)	Lidl–Trek	+ 2h 29' 13"
50	Marco Brenner (GER)	Tudor Pro Cycling Team	+ 2h 29' 27"
51	Rudy Molard (FRA)	Groupama–FDJ United	+ 2h 33' 24"
52	Finn Fisher-Black (NZL)	Red Bull–Bora–Hansgrohe	+ 2h 36' 23"
53	Gianmarco Garofoli (ITA)	Soudal–Quick-Step	+ 2h 37' 12"
54	Will Barta (USA)	Tudor Pro Cycling Team	+ 2h 37' 27"
55	Mauri Vansevenant (BEL)	Soudal–Quick-Step	+ 2h 38' 35"
56	Rudy Porter (AUS)	Team Jayco–AlUla	+ 2h 38' 50"
57	Reuben Thompson (NZL)	Lotto–Intermarché	+ 2h 38' 55"
58	Paul Ourselin (FRA)	Cofidis	+ 2h 39' 25"
59	Pau Martí (ESP)	NSN Cycling Team	+ 2h 40' 08"
60	Bruno Armirail (FRA)	Visma–Lease a Bike	+ 2h 40' 33"
61	Andreas Leknessund (NOR)	Uno-X Mobility	+ 2h 43' 07"
62	Enzo Paleni (FRA)	Groupama–FDJ United	+ 2h 44' 58"
63	Axel Laurance (FRA)	Netcompany INEOS	+ 2h 46' 19"
64	James Shaw (GBR)	EF Education–EasyPost	+ 2h 46' 32"
65	Marcel Camprubí (ESP)	Pinarello–Q36.5 Pro Cycling Team	+ 2h 50' 55"
66	Andreas Kron (DEN)	Uno-X Mobility	+ 2h 51' 03"
67	Thomas Gloag (GBR)	Pinarello–Q36.5 Pro Cycling Team	+ 2h 53' 29"
68	Ibon Ruiz (ESP)	Equipo Kern Pharma	+ 2h 54' 03"
69	Rémy Rochas (FRA)	Groupama–FDJ United	+ 2h 55' 00"
70	Walter Calzoni (ITA)	Pinarello–Q36.5 Pro Cycling Team	+ 2h 56' 58"
71	Lennard Kämna (GER)	Lidl–Trek	+ 2h 57' 47"
72	Fabian Weiss (SUI)	Tudor Pro Cycling Team	+ 2h 59' 24"
73	Iván Romeo (ESP)	Movistar Team	+ 3h 01' 28"
74	Clément Alleno (FRA)	Burgos Burpellet BH	+ 3h 01' 55"
75	Bastien Tronchon (FRA)	Groupama–FDJ United	+ 3h 03' 31"
76	Hugo Hofstetter (FRA)	NSN Cycling Team	+ 3h 03' 47"
77	José Luis Faura (ESP)	Burgos Burpellet BH	+ 3h 05' 08"
78	Sergio Samitier (ESP)	Cofidis	+ 3h 08' 26"
79	Steven Kruijswijk (NED)	Visma–Lease a Bike	+ 3h 08' 32"
80	Sander De Pestel (BEL)	Decathlon CMA CGM	+ 3h 13' 33"
81	Pablo Castrillo (ESP)	Movistar Team	+ 3h 14' 39"
82	Simon Dalby (DEN)	Uno-X Mobility	+ 3h 16' 53"
83	Vincenzo Albanese (ITA)	EF Education–EasyPost	+ 3h 19' 12"
84	Lucas Hamilton (AUS)	Netcompany INEOS	+ 3h 20' 41"
85	Jesús Herrada (ESP)	Burgos Burpellet BH	+ 3h 21' 29"
86	Roland Thalmann (SUI)	Tudor Pro Cycling Team	+ 3h 22' 35"
87	Iván Sosa (COL)	Equipo Kern Pharma	+ 3h 24' 24"
88	Gianni Vermeersch (BEL)	Red Bull–Bora–Hansgrohe	+ 3h 29' 09"
89	Lars Craps (BEL)	Lotto–Intermarché	+ 3h 29' 12"
90	Carlos Canal (ESP)	Movistar Team	+ 3h 30' 08"
91	João Almeida (POR)	UAE Team Emirates XRG	+ 3h 30' 16"
92	Alessandro Romele (ITA)	XDS Astana Team	+ 3h 31' 07"
93	Jacopo Mosca (ITA)	Lidl–Trek	+ 3h 37' 51"
94	Michael Gogl (AUT)	Alpecin–Premier Tech	+ 3h 40' 20"
95	Sylvain Moniquet (BEL)	Cofidis	+ 3h 43' 18"
96	Frederik Wandahl (DEN)	Red Bull–Bora–Hansgrohe	+ 3h 44' 17"
97	Fredrik Dversnes (NOR)	Uno-X Mobility	+ 3h 45' 26"
98	Gal Glivar (SLO)	Alpecin–Premier Tech	+ 3h 46' 27"
99	Ivo Oliveira (POR)	UAE Team Emirates XRG	+ 3h 46' 43"
100	Lorenzo Rota (ITA)	Lotto–Intermarché	+ 3h 48' 44"
101	Xabier Azparren (ESP)	Pinarello–Q36.5 Pro Cycling Team	+ 3h 48' 45"
102	Mathijs Paasschens (NED)	Team Bahrain Victorious	+ 3h 48' 51"
103	Mats Wenzel (LUX)	Equipo Kern Pharma	+ 3h 50' 54"
104	Darren Rafferty (IRL)	EF Education–EasyPost	+ 3h 55' 15"
105	David de la Cruz (ESP)	Pinarello–Q36.5 Pro Cycling Team	+ 3h 57' 34"
106	Magnus Cort (DEN)	Uno-X Mobility	+ 3h 58' 30"
107	Nick Schultz (AUS)	NSN Cycling Team	+ 3h 58' 53"
108	Matthew Brennan (GBR)	Visma–Lease a Bike	+ 4h 00' 02"
109	Martin Tjøtta (NOR)	Uno-X Mobility	+ 4h 00' 30"
110	Jorge Arcas (ESP)	Movistar Team	+ 4h 00' 31"
111	Darren van Bekkum (NED)	XDS Astana Team	+ 4h 01' 08"
112	Thibau Nys (BEL)	Lidl–Trek	+ 4h 06' 27"
113	Iván Cobo (ESP)	Equipo Kern Pharma	+ 4h 08' 21"
114	Oscar Chamberlain (AUS)	Decathlon CMA CGM	+ 4h 08' 22"
115	Iñigo Elosegui (ESP)	Equipo Kern Pharma	+ 4h 11' 57"
116	Sinuhé Fernández (ESP)	Burgos Burpellet BH	+ 4h 14' 13"
117	Bryan Coquard (FRA)	Cofidis	+ 4h 15' 29"
118	Georg Steinhauser (GER)	EF Education–EasyPost	+ 4h 16' 16"
119	Roman Ermakov (SLO)	Team Bahrain Victorious	+ 4h 16' 27"
120	Timo de Jong (NED)	Team Picnic–PostNL	+ 4h 21' 01"
121	Gianni Moscon (ITA)	Red Bull–Bora–Hansgrohe	+ 4h 24' 15"
122	Orluis Aular (VEN)	Movistar Team	+ 4h 25' 11"
123	Alastair MacKellar (AUS)	EF Education–EasyPost	+ 4h 26' 34"
124	Jasha Sütterlin (GER)	Team Jayco–AlUla	+ 4h 26' 39"
125	Alessandro Covi (ITA)	Team Jayco–AlUla	+ 4h 29' 00"
126	Rasmus Tiller (NOR)	Uno-X Mobility	+ 4h 29' 51"
127	Fabio Van den Bossche (BEL)	Soudal–Quick-Step	+ 4h 32' 17"
128	Callum Thornley (GBR)	Red Bull–Bora–Hansgrohe	+ 4h 32' 20"
129	Juan Guillermo Martínez (COL)	Team Picnic–PostNL	+ 4h 34' 08"
130	Alberto Dainese (ITA)	Soudal–Quick-Step	+ 4h 38' 17"
131	Olivier Le Gac (FRA)	Groupama–FDJ United	+ 4h 41' 40"
132	Vito Braet (BEL)	Lotto–Intermarché	+ 4h 48' 14"
133	César Macías (MEX)	Burgos Burpellet BH	+ 4h 48' 46"
134	Louis Rouland (FRA)	Cofidis	+ 4h 55' 04"
135	Steffen De Schuyteneer (BEL)	Lotto–Intermarché	+ 4h 56' 43"
136	Marc Brustenga (ESP)	Equipo Kern Pharma	+ 4h 58' 26"
137	Matevž Govekar (SLO)	Team Bahrain Victorious	+ 5h 01' 15"
138	Asbjørn Hellemose (DEN)	Team Jayco–AlUla	+ 5h 13' 22"
139	Ethan Hayter (GBR)	Soudal–Quick-Step	+ 5h 17' 18"
140	Domen Novak (SLO)	UAE Team Emirates XRG	+ 5h 22' 08"
141	Jordi Meeus (BEL)	Red Bull–Bora–Hansgrohe	+ 5h 24' 31"
142	Mathias Norsgaard (DEN)	Lidl–Trek	+ 6h 15' 51"

=== Points classification ===
Final points classification (1–10)
Rank	Rider	Team	Points
1	Wout van Aert (BEL)	Visma–Lease a Bike	326
2	Matthew Brennan (GBR)	Visma–Lease a Bike	273
3	Alessandro Romele (ITA)	XDS Astana Team	216
4	Bryan Coquard (FRA)	Cofidis	141
5	Jordi Meeus (BEL)	Red Bull–Bora–Hansgrohe	116
6	Kevin Vermaerke (USA)	UAE Team Emirates XRG	115
7	Ramses Debruyne (BEL)	Alpecin–Premier Tech	115
8	Andreas Leknessund (NOR)	Uno-X Mobility	106
9	Tobias Halland Johannessen (NOR)	Uno-X Mobility	104
10	Bastien Tronchon (FRA)	Groupama–FDJ United	103

=== Mountains classification ===
Final mountains classification (1–10)
Rank	Rider	Team	Points
1	Santiago Buitrago (COL)	Team Bahrain Victorious	78
2	Wout van Aert (BEL)	Visma–Lease a Bike	62
3	Andreas Leknessund (NOR)	Uno-X Mobility	36
4	Mikel Landa (ESP)	Soudal–Quick-Step	30
5	Tobias Halland Johannessen (NOR)	Uno-X Mobility	28
6	Enric Mas (ESP)	Movistar Team	24
7	Pau Miquel (ESP)	Team Bahrain Victorious	23
8	Lorenzo Fortunato (ITA)	XDS Astana Team	21
9	Ramses Debruyne (BEL)	Alpecin–Premier Tech	19
10	Kevin Vermaerke (USA)	UAE Team Emirates XRG	14

=== Young rider classification ===
Final young rider classification (1–10)
Rank	Rider	Team	Time
1	Oscar Onley (GBR)	Netcompany INEOS	74h 02' 23"
2	Jakob Omrzel (SLO)	Team Bahrain Victorious	+ 1' 10"
3	Léo Bisiaux (FRA)	Decathlon CMA CGM	+ 15' 35"
4	Juan Felipe Rodríguez (COL)	EF Education–EasyPost	+ 38' 28"
5	Embret Svestad-Bårdseng (NOR)	Netcompany INEOS	+ 1h 01' 18"
6	Raúl García Pierna (ESP)	Movistar Team	+ 1h 07' 17"
7	Jarno Widar (BEL)	Lotto–Intermarché	+ 1h 09' 24"
8	Finlay Pickering (GBR)	Team Jayco–AlUla	+ 1h 19' 42"
9	Ramses Debruyne (BEL)	Alpecin–Premier Tech	+ 1h 41' 03"
10	Valentin Paret-Peintre (FRA)	Soudal–Quick-Step	+ 1h 47' 13"

=== Team classification ===
Final team classification (1–10)
Rank	Team	Time
1	(France) Decathlon CMA CGM	222h 25' 14"
2	(Kazakhstan) XDS Astana Team	+ 38' 00"
3	Team Bahrain Victorious	+ 54' 46"
4	(France) Groupama–FDJ United	+ 1h 01' 28"
5	(United Kingdom) Netcompany INEOS	+ 1h 25' 12"
6	(Netherlands) Visma–Lease a Bike	+ 1h 48' 16"
7	(Spain) Movistar Team	+ 1h 56' 38"
8	(United States) EF Education–EasyPost	+ 2h 00' 07"
9	(Belgium) Soudal–Quick-Step	+ 2h 13' 27"
10	(Spain) Burgos Burpellet BH	+ 2h 54' 18"
