= 2026 UAE Tour =

Emirati cycling race

2026 UCI World Tour, race 3 of 36

Race details
- Dates: 16–22 February 2026
- Stages: 7
- Distance: 978.2 km (607.8 mi)
- Winning time: 21h 10' 30"

Results
| Jersey awarded to the overall winner | Winner | Isaac del Toro (MEX) | (UAE Team Emirates XRG) |
| | Second | Antonio Tiberi (ITA) | (Team Bahrain Victorious) |
| | Third | Luke Plapp (AUS) | (Team Jayco–AlUla) |
| Jersey awarded to the points classification winner | Points | Jonathan Milan (ITA) | (Lidl–Trek) |
| Jersey awarded to the youth classification winner | Youth | Isaac del Toro (MEX) | (UAE Team Emirates XRG) |
| Jersey awarded to the sprints classification winner | Sprints | Silvan Dillier (SUI) | (Alpecin–Premier Tech) |
| | Team | (United Arab Emirates) UAE Team Emirates XRG | |

The 2026 UAE Tour was a road cycling stage race that took place between 16 and 22 February in the United Arab Emirates. It was the eighth edition of the UAE Tour, and the third race of the 2026 UCI World Tour.

== Teams ==
All eighteen UCI WorldTeams and three UCI ProTeams took part in the race.

UCI WorldTeams

- Alpecin–Premier Tech
- Decathlon CMA CGM
- EF Education–EasyPost
- Groupama–FDJ United
- INEOS Grenadiers
- Lidl–Trek
- Lotto–Intermarché
- Movistar Team
- NSN Cycling Team
- Red Bull–Bora–Hansgrohe
- Soudal–Quick-Step
- Team Bahrain Victorious
- Team Jayco–AlUla
- Team Picnic–PostNL
- Visma–Lease a Bike
- UAE Team Emirates XRG
- Uno-X Mobility
- XDS Astana Team

UCI ProTeams

- Modern Adventure Pro Cycling
- Pinarello–Q36.5 Pro Cycling Team
- Tudor Pro Cycling Team

== Route ==
Stage characteristics and winners
| Stage | Date | Course | Distance | Type | Stage winner |
|---|---|---|---|---|---|
| 1 | 16 February | Madinat Zayed Majlis to Liwa Palace | ~~144 km (89 mi)~~ 118 km (73 mi) | Flat stage | Isaac del Toro (MEX) |
| 2 | 17 February | Al Hudayriat Island to Al Hudayriat Island | 12.2 km (7.6 mi) | Individual time trial | Remco Evenepoel (BEL) |
| 3 | 18 February | Umm Al Quwain to Jebel Mobrah | 182 km (113 mi) | Mountain stage | Antonio Tiberi (ITA) |
| 4 | 19 February | Fujairah to Fujairah | 182 km (113 mi) | Flat stage | Jonathan Milan (ITA) |
| 5 | 20 February | Dubai Al Mamzar Park to Hamdan Bin Mohammed Smart University | 165 km (103 mi) | Flat stage | Jonathan Milan (ITA) |
| 6 | 21 February | Al Ain Museum to Jebel Hafeet | 168 km (104 mi) | Mountain stage | Isaac del Toro (MEX) |
| 7 | 22 February | Zayed National Museum to Abu Dhabi Breakwater | 149 km (93 mi) | Flat stage | Jonathan Milan (ITA) |
| Total | | | 978.2 km (607.8 mi) | | |

== Stages ==
=== Stage 1 ===
16 February 2026 — Madinat Zayed Majlis to Liwa Palace, 118 km (73 mi)

Stage 1 Result
| Rank | Rider | Team | Time |
|---|---|---|---|
| 1 | Isaac del Toro (MEX) | UAE Team Emirates XRG | 2h 30' 56" |
| 2 | Cees Bol (NED) | Decathlon CMA CGM | + 0" |
| 3 | Antonio Tiberi (ITA) | Team Bahrain Victorious | + 0" |
| 4 | Matteo Malucelli (ITA) | XDS Astana Team | + 0" |
| 5 | Alessandro Romele (ITA) | XDS Astana Team | + 0" |
| 6 | Ilan Van Wilder (BEL) | Soudal–Quick-Step | + 0" |
| 7 | Riley Pickrell (CAN) | Modern Adventure Pro Cycling | + 0" |
| 8 | Lennert Van Eetvelt (BEL) | Lotto–Intermarché | + 0" |
| 9 | Ethan Vernon (GBR) | NSN Cycling Team | + 0" |
| 10 | Tobias Halland Johannessen (NOR) | Uno-X Mobility | + 0" |

General classification after Stage 1
| Rank | Rider | Team | Time |
|---|---|---|---|
| 1 | Isaac del Toro (MEX) | UAE Team Emirates XRG | 2h 30' 46" |
| 2 | Cees Bol (NED) | Decathlon CMA CGM | + 4" |
| 3 | Antonio Tiberi (ITA) | Team Bahrain Victorious | + 6" |
| 4 | Jonathan Milan (ITA) | Lidl–Trek | + 7" |
| 5 | Ben Tulett (GBR) | Visma–Lease a Bike | + 8" |
| 6 | Lennert Van Eetvelt (BEL) | Lotto–Intermarché | + 9" |
| 7 | Matteo Malucelli (ITA) | XDS Astana Team | + 10" |
| 8 | Alessandro Romele (ITA) | XDS Astana Team | + 10" |
| 9 | Ilan Van Wilder (BEL) | Soudal–Quick-Step | + 10" |
| 10 | Riley Pickrell (CAN) | Modern Adventure Pro Cycling | + 10" |

=== Stage 2 ===
17 February 2026 – Al Hudayriat Island to Al Hudayriat Island, 12.2 km (7.6 mi) (ITT)

Stage 2 Result
| Rank | Rider | Team | Time |
|---|---|---|---|
| 1 | Remco Evenepoel (BEL) | Red Bull–Bora–Hansgrohe | 13' 03" |
| 2 | Joshua Tarling (GBR) | INEOS Grenadiers | + 6" |
| 3 | Rémi Cavagna (FRA) | Groupama–FDJ United | + 12" |
| 4 | Ethan Hayter (GBR) | Soudal–Quick-Step | + 25" |
| 5 | Daan Hoole (NED) | Decathlon CMA CGM | + 26" |
| 6 | Luke Plapp (AUS) | Team Jayco–AlUla | + 26" |
| 7 | Artem Shmidt (USA) | INEOS Grenadiers | + 29" |
| 8 | Florian Vermeersch (BEL) | UAE Team Emirates XRG | + 30" |
| 9 | Stefan Bissegger (SUI) | Decathlon CMA CGM | + 31" |
| 10 | Rune Herregodts (BEL) | UAE Team Emirates XRG | + 32" |

General classification after Stage 2
| Rank | Rider | Team | Time |
|---|---|---|---|
| 1 | Remco Evenepoel (BEL) | Red Bull–Bora–Hansgrohe | 2h 43' 59" |
| 2 | Joshua Tarling (GBR) | INEOS Grenadiers | + 6" |
| 3 | Rémi Cavagna (FRA) | Groupama–FDJ United | + 12" |
| 4 | Ethan Hayter (GBR) | Soudal–Quick-Step | + 25" |
| 5 | Daan Hoole (NED) | Decathlon CMA CGM | + 26" |
| 6 | Luke Plapp (AUS) | Team Jayco–AlUla | + 26" |
| 7 | Florian Vermeersch (BEL) | UAE Team Emirates XRG | + 30" |
| 8 | Antonio Tiberi (ITA) | Team Bahrain Victorious | + 30" |
| 9 | Stefan Bissegger (SUI) | Decathlon CMA CGM | + 31" |
| 10 | Isaac del Toro (MEX) | UAE Team Emirates XRG | + 32" |

=== Stage 3 ===
18 February 2026 – Umm Al Quwain to Jebel Mobrah, 182 km (113 mi)

Stage 3 Result
| Rank | Rider | Team | Time |
|---|---|---|---|
| 1 | Antonio Tiberi (ITA) | Team Bahrain Victorious | 4h 24' 44" |
| 2 | Isaac del Toro (MEX) | UAE Team Emirates XRG | + 15" |
| 3 | Lennert Van Eetvelt (BEL) | Lotto–Intermarché | + 29" |
| 4 | Harold Tejada (COL) | XDS Astana Team | + 41" |
| 5 | Felix Gall (AUT) | Decathlon CMA CGM | + 51" |
| 6 | Tobias Halland Johannessen (NOR) | Uno-X Mobility | + 51" |
| 7 | Derek Gee-West (CAN) | Lidl–Trek | + 1' 07" |
| 8 | Jørgen Nordhagen (NOR) | Visma–Lease a Bike | + 1' 07" |
| 9 | Ilan Van Wilder (BEL) | Soudal–Quick-Step | + 1' 07" |
| 10 | Luke Plapp (AUS) | Team Jayco–AlUla | + 1' 13" |

General classification after Stage 3
| Rank | Rider | Team | Time |
|---|---|---|---|
| 1 | Antonio Tiberi (ITA) | Team Bahrain Victorious | 7h 09' 03" |
| 2 | Isaac del Toro (MEX) | UAE Team Emirates XRG | + 21" |
| 3 | Harold Tejada (COL) | XDS Astana Team | + 1' 00" |
| 4 | Lennert Van Eetvelt (BEL) | Lotto–Intermarché | + 1' 07" |
| 5 | Luke Plapp (AUS) | Team Jayco–AlUla | + 1' 19" |
| 6 | Ilan Van Wilder (BEL) | Soudal–Quick-Step | + 1' 21" |
| 7 | Derek Gee-West (CAN) | Lidl–Trek | + 1' 22" |
| 8 | Felix Gall (AUT) | Decathlon CMA CGM | + 1' 28" |
| 9 | Jørgen Nordhagen (NOR) | Visma–Lease a Bike | + 1' 30" |
| 10 | Tobias Halland Johannessen (NOR) | Uno-X Mobility | + 1' 43" |

=== Stage 4 ===
19 February 2026 – Fujairah to Fujairah, 182 km (113 mi)

Stage 4 Result
| Rank | Rider | Team | Time |
|---|---|---|---|
| 1 | Jonathan Milan (ITA) | Lidl–Trek | 4h 03' 06" |
| 2 | Ethan Vernon (GBR) | NSN Cycling Team | + 0" |
| 3 | Matteo Milan (ITA) | Groupama–FDJ United | + 0" |
| 4 | Gerben Thijssen (BEL) | Alpecin–Premier Tech | + 0" |
| 5 | Robin Froidevaux (SUI) | Tudor Pro Cycling Team | + 0" |
| 6 | Matteo Malucelli (ITA) | XDS Astana Team | + 0" |
| 7 | Steffen De Schuyteneer (BEL) | Lotto–Intermarché | + 0" |
| 8 | Riley Pickrell (CAN) | Modern Adventure Pro Cycling | + 0" |
| 9 | Sam Welsford (AUS) | INEOS Grenadiers | + 0" |
| 10 | Emmanuel Houcou (FRA) | Pinarello–Q36.5 Pro Cycling Team | + 0" |

General classification after Stage 4
| Rank | Rider | Team | Time |
|---|---|---|---|
| 1 | Antonio Tiberi (ITA) | Team Bahrain Victorious | 11h 12' 09" |
| 2 | Isaac del Toro (MEX) | UAE Team Emirates XRG | + 21" |
| 3 | Harold Tejada (COL) | XDS Astana Team | + 1' 00" |
| 4 | Lennert Van Eetvelt (BEL) | Lotto–Intermarché | + 1' 07" |
| 5 | Luke Plapp (AUS) | Team Jayco–AlUla | + 1' 19" |
| 6 | Ilan Van Wilder (BEL) | Soudal–Quick-Step | + 1' 21" |
| 7 | Derek Gee-West (CAN) | Lidl–Trek | + 1' 22" |
| 8 | Felix Gall (AUT) | Decathlon CMA CGM | + 1' 28" |
| 9 | Jørgen Nordhagen (NOR) | Visma–Lease a Bike | + 1' 30" |
| 10 | Tobias Halland Johannessen (NOR) | Uno-X Mobility | + 1' 43" |

=== Stage 5 ===
20 February 2026 – Dubai Al Mamzar Park to Hamdan Bin Mohammed Smart University, 165 km (103 mi)

Stage 5 Result
| Rank | Rider | Team | Time |
|---|---|---|---|
| 1 | Jonathan Milan (ITA) | Lidl–Trek | 3h 33' 18" |
| 2 | Erlend Blikra (NOR) | Uno-X Mobility | + 0" |
| 3 | Matteo Malucelli (ITA) | XDS Astana Team | + 0" |
| 4 | Luka Mezgec (SLO) | Team Jayco–AlUla | + 0" |
| 5 | Daniel Skerl (ITA) | Team Bahrain Victorious | + 0" |
| 6 | Ethan Vernon (GBR) | NSN Cycling Team | + 0" |
| 7 | Steffen De Schuyteneer (BEL) | Lotto–Intermarché | + 0" |
| 8 | Axel Huens (FRA) | Groupama–FDJ United | + 0" |
| 9 | Madis Mihkels (EST) | EF Education–EasyPost | + 0" |
| 10 | Nicolò Parisini (ITA) | Pinarello–Q36.5 Pro Cycling Team | + 0" |

General classification after Stage 5
| Rank | Rider | Team | Time |
|---|---|---|---|
| 1 | Antonio Tiberi (ITA) | Team Bahrain Victorious | 14h 45' 27" |
| 2 | Isaac del Toro (MEX) | UAE Team Emirates XRG | + 21" |
| 3 | Harold Tejada (COL) | XDS Astana Team | + 1' 00" |
| 4 | Lennert Van Eetvelt (BEL) | Lotto–Intermarché | + 1' 07" |
| 5 | Luke Plapp (AUS) | Team Jayco–AlUla | + 1' 19" |
| 6 | Ilan Van Wilder (BEL) | Soudal–Quick-Step | + 1' 21" |
| 7 | Derek Gee-West (CAN) | Lidl–Trek | + 1' 22" |
| 8 | Felix Gall (AUT) | Decathlon CMA CGM | + 1' 28" |
| 9 | Jørgen Nordhagen (NOR) | Visma–Lease a Bike | + 1' 30" |
| 10 | Tobias Halland Johannessen (NOR) | Uno-X Mobility | + 1' 43" |

=== Stage 6 ===
21 February 2026 – Al Ain Museum to Jebel Hafeet, 168 km (104 mi)

Stage 6 Result
| Rank | Rider | Team | Time |
|---|---|---|---|
| 1 | Isaac del Toro (MEX) | UAE Team Emirates XRG | 3h 27' 54" |
| 2 | Luke Plapp (AUS) | Team Jayco–AlUla | + 12" |
| 3 | Felix Gall (AUT) | Decathlon CMA CGM | + 21" |
| 4 | Antonio Tiberi (ITA) | Team Bahrain Victorious | + 31" |
| 5 | Tobias Halland Johannessen (NOR) | Uno-X Mobility | + 36" |
| 6 | Jørgen Nordhagen (NOR) | Visma–Lease a Bike | + 36" |
| 7 | Derek Gee-West (CAN) | Lidl–Trek | + 36" |
| 8 | Harold Tejada (COL) | XDS Astana Team | + 36" |
| 9 | David Gaudu (FRA) | Groupama–FDJ United | + 48" |
| 10 | Michael Storer (AUS) | Tudor Pro Cycling Team | + 48" |

General classification after Stage 6
| Rank | Rider | Team | Time |
|---|---|---|---|
| 1 | Isaac del Toro (MEX) | UAE Team Emirates XRG | 18h 13' 42" |
| 2 | Antonio Tiberi (ITA) | Team Bahrain Victorious | + 20" |
| 3 | Luke Plapp (AUS) | Team Jayco–AlUla | + 1' 14" |
| 4 | Harold Tejada (COL) | XDS Astana Team | + 1' 25" |
| 5 | Felix Gall (AUT) | Decathlon CMA CGM | + 1' 34" |
| 6 | Lennert Van Eetvelt (BEL) | Lotto–Intermarché | + 1' 44" |
| 7 | Derek Gee-West (CAN) | Lidl–Trek | + 1' 47" |
| 8 | Jørgen Nordhagen (NOR) | Visma–Lease a Bike | + 1' 55" |
| 9 | Tobias Halland Johannessen (NOR) | Uno-X Mobility | + 2' 08" |
| 10 | Remco Evenepoel (BEL) | Red Bull–Bora–Hansgrohe | + 2' 25" |

=== Stage 7 ===
22 February 2026 – Zayed National Museum to Abu Dhabi Breakwater, 149 km (93 mi)

Stage 7 Result
| Rank | Rider | Team | Time |
|---|---|---|---|
| 1 | Jonathan Milan (ITA) | Lidl–Trek | 2h 56' 48" |
| 2 | Erlend Blikra (NOR) | Uno-X Mobility | + 0" |
| 3 | Sam Welsford (AUS) | INEOS Grenadiers | + 0" |
| 4 | Ethan Vernon (GBR) | NSN Cycling Team | + 0" |
| 5 | Matteo Malucelli (ITA) | XDS Astana Team | + 0" |
| 6 | Madis Mihkels (EST) | EF Education–EasyPost | + 0" |
| 7 | Gerben Thijssen (BEL) | Alpecin–Premier Tech | + 0" |
| 8 | Luka Mezgec (SLO) | Team Jayco–AlUla | + 0" |
| 9 | Riley Pickrell (CAN) | Modern Adventure Pro Cycling | + 0" |
| 10 | Daniel Skerl (ITA) | Team Bahrain Victorious | + 0" |

General classification after Stage 7
| Rank | Rider | Team | Time |
|---|---|---|---|
| 1 | Isaac del Toro (MEX) | UAE Team Emirates XRG | 21h 10' 30" |
| 2 | Antonio Tiberi (ITA) | Team Bahrain Victorious | + 20" |
| 3 | Luke Plapp (AUS) | Team Jayco–AlUla | + 1' 14" |
| 4 | Harold Tejada (COL) | XDS Astana Team | + 1' 25" |
| 5 | Felix Gall (AUT) | Decathlon CMA CGM | + 1' 34" |
| 6 | Lennert Van Eetvelt (BEL) | Lotto–Intermarché | + 1' 44" |
| 7 | Derek Gee-West (CAN) | Lidl–Trek | + 1' 47" |
| 8 | Jørgen Nordhagen (NOR) | Visma–Lease a Bike | + 1' 55" |
| 9 | Tobias Halland Johannessen (NOR) | Uno-X Mobility | + 2' 08" |
| 10 | Remco Evenepoel (BEL) | Red Bull–Bora–Hansgrohe | + 2' 25" |

== Classification leadership table ==
Classification leadership by stage
| Stage | Winner | General classification | Points classification | Sprints classification | Young rider classification | Team classification |
|---|---|---|---|---|---|---|
| 1 | Isaac del Toro | Isaac del Toro | Isaac del Toro | Jonathan Milan | Isaac del Toro | XDS Astana Team |
| 2 | Remco Evenepoel | Remco Evenepoel | Remco Evenepoel | Jonathan Milan | Joshua Tarling | INEOS Grenadiers |
| 3 | Antonio Tiberi | Antonio Tiberi | Isaac del Toro | Silvan Dillier | Antonio Tiberi | UAE Team Emirates XRG |
| 4 | Jonathan Milan | Antonio Tiberi | Isaac del Toro | Silvan Dillier | Antonio Tiberi | UAE Team Emirates XRG |
| 5 | Jonathan Milan | Antonio Tiberi | Jonathan Milan | Silvan Dillier | Antonio Tiberi | UAE Team Emirates XRG |
| 6 | Isaac del Toro | Isaac del Toro | Isaac del Toro | Silvan Dillier | Isaac del Toro | UAE Team Emirates XRG |
| 7 | Jonathan Milan | Isaac del Toro | Jonathan Milan | Silvan Dillier | Isaac del Toro | UAE Team Emirates XRG |
| Final | | Isaac del Toro | Jonathan Milan | Silvan Dillier | Isaac del Toro | UAE Team Emirates XRG |

== Classification standings ==
Legend
| Denotes the winner of the general classification | Denotes the winner of the sprints classification |
| Denotes the winner of the points classification | Denotes the winner of the young rider classification |

=== General classification ===
Final general classification (1–10)
| Rank | Rider | Team | Time |
|---|---|---|---|
| 1 | Isaac del Toro (MEX) | UAE Team Emirates XRG | 21h 10' 30" |
| 2 | Antonio Tiberi (ITA) | Team Bahrain Victorious | + 20" |
| 3 | Luke Plapp (AUS) | Team Jayco–AlUla | + 1' 14" |
| 4 | Harold Tejada (COL) | XDS Astana Team | + 1' 25" |
| 5 | Felix Gall (AUT) | Decathlon CMA CGM | + 1' 34" |
| 6 | Lennert Van Eetvelt (BEL) | Lotto–Intermarché | + 1' 44" |
| 7 | Derek Gee-West (CAN) | Lidl–Trek | + 1' 47" |
| 8 | Jørgen Nordhagen (NOR) | Visma–Lease a Bike | + 1' 55" |
| 9 | Tobias Halland Johannessen (NOR) | Uno-X Mobility | + 2' 08" |
| 10 | Remco Evenepoel (BEL) | Red Bull–Bora–Hansgrohe | + 2' 25" |

=== Points classification ===
Final points classification (1–10)
| Rank | Rider | Team | Points |
|---|---|---|---|
| 1 | Jonathan Milan (ITA) | Lidl–Trek | 70 |
| 2 | Isaac del Toro (MEX) | UAE Team Emirates XRG | 56 |
| 3 | Antonio Tiberi (ITA) | Team Bahrain Victorious | 41 |
| 4 | Silvan Dillier (SUI) | Alpecin–Premier Tech | 40 |
| 5 | Matteo Malucelli (ITA) | XDS Astana Team | 33 |
| 6 | Ethan Vernon (GBR) | NSN Cycling Team | 32 |
| 7 | Erlend Blikra (NOR) | Uno-X Mobility | 32 |
| 8 | Luke Plapp (AUS) | Team Jayco–AlUla | 23 |
| 9 | Remco Evenepoel (BEL) | Red Bull–Bora–Hansgrohe | 20 |
| 10 | Felix Gall (AUT) | Decathlon CMA CGM | 19 |

=== Sprints classification ===
Final sprints classification (1–10)
| Rank | Rider | Team | Points |
|---|---|---|---|
| 1 | Silvan Dillier (SUI) | Alpecin–Premier Tech | 40 |
| 2 | Patrick Gamper (AUT) | Team Jayco–AlUla | 16 |
| 3 | Aivaras Mikutis (LTU) | Tudor Pro Cycling Team | 13 |
| 4 | Jonathan Milan (ITA) | Lidl–Trek | 10 |
| 5 | Stefan De Bod (RSA) | Modern Adventure Pro Cycling | 10 |
| 6 | Jonas Rickaert (BEL) | Alpecin–Premier Tech | 10 |
| 7 | Gianni Moscon (ITA) | Red Bull–Bora–Hansgrohe | 10 |
| 8 | Daan Hoole (NED) | Decathlon CMA CGM | 9 |
| 9 | Axel Huens (FRA) | Groupama–FDJ United | 8 |
| 10 | Johan Jacobs (SUI) | Groupama–FDJ United | 8 |

=== Young rider classification ===
Final young rider classification (1–10)
| Rank | Rider | Team | Time |
|---|---|---|---|
| 1 | Isaac del Toro (MEX) | UAE Team Emirates XRG | 21h 10' 30" |
| 2 | Antonio Tiberi (ITA) | Team Bahrain Victorious | + 20" |
| 3 | Lennert Van Eetvelt (BEL) | Lotto–Intermarché | + 1' 44" |
| 4 | Jørgen Nordhagen (NOR) | Visma–Lease a Bike | + 1' 55" |
| 5 | Mathys Rondel (FRA) | Tudor Pro Cycling Team | + 2' 38" |
| 6 | Tijmen Graat (NED) | Visma–Lease a Bike | + 3' 50" |
| 7 | Embret Svestad-Bårdseng (NOR) | INEOS Grenadiers | + 3' 57" |
| 8 | Georg Steinhauser (GER) | EF Education–EasyPost | + 4' 41" |
| 9 | Pablo Castrillo (ESP) | Movistar Team | + 4' 57" |
| 10 | Junior Lecerf (BEL) | Soudal–Quick-Step | + 5' 37" |

=== Teams classification ===
Final team classification (1–10)
| Rank | Team | Time |
|---|---|---|
| 1 | (United Arab Emirates) UAE Team Emirates XRG | 63h 40' 56" |
| 2 | (Netherlands) Visma–Lease a Bike | + 22" |
| 3 | (Norway) Uno-X Mobility | + 5' 25" |
| 4 | (United States) EF Education–EasyPost | + 5' 33" |
| 5 | (Spain) Movistar Team | + 8' 36" |
| 6 | (Australia) Team Jayco–AlUla | + 8' 40" |
| 7 | (Kazakhstan) XDS Astana Team | + 9' 21" |
| 8 | (Switzerland) Pinarello–Q36.5 Pro Cycling Team | + 9' 58" |
| 9 | (Switzerland) Tudor Pro Cycling Team | + 11' 12" |
| 10 | Team Bahrain Victorious | + 18' 54" |
