= 2026 Paris–Nice =

Road cycling race in France

2026 UCI World Tour, race 6 of 36

Race details
- Dates: 8–15 March 2026
- Stages: 8
- Distance: 1,153.4 km (716.7 mi)
- Winning time: 25h 25' 11"

Results
Jersey awarded to the overall winner	Winner	Jonas Vingegaard (DEN)	(Visma–Lease a Bike)
	Second	Daniel Martínez (COL)	(Red Bull–Bora–Hansgrohe)
	Third	Georg Steinhauser (GER)	(EF Education–EasyPost)
Jersey awarded to the points classification winner	Points	Jonas Vingegaard (DEN)	(Visma–Lease a Bike)
Jersey awarded to the mountains classification winner	Mountains	Jonas Vingegaard (DEN)	(Visma–Lease a Bike)
Jersey awarded to the young rider classification winner	Young rider	Georg Steinhauser (GER)	(EF Education–EasyPost)
	Team	(United Kingdom) INEOS Grenadiers	

The 2026 Paris–Nice was a road cycling stage race which started on 8 March and finished on 15 March in France. It was the 84th edition of Paris–Nice and the sixth race of the 2026 UCI World Tour.

== Teams ==
All eighteen UCI WorldTeams and four UCI ProTeams made up the 22 teams that participated in the race.

UCI WorldTeams

- Alpecin–Premier Tech
- Decathlon CMA CGM
- EF Education–EasyPost
- Groupama–FDJ United
- INEOS Grenadiers
- Lidl–Trek
- Lotto–Intermarché
- Movistar Team
- NSN Cycling Team
- Red Bull–Bora–Hansgrohe
- Soudal–Quick-Step
- Team Bahrain Victorious
- Team Jayco–AlUla
- Team Picnic–PostNL
- Visma–Lease a Bike
- UAE Team Emirates XRG
- Uno-X Mobility
- XDS Astana Team

UCI ProTeams

- Cofidis
- Pinarello–Q36.5 Pro Cycling Team
- Team TotalEnergies
- Tudor Pro Cycling Team

== Route ==
Stage characteristics and winners
Stage	Date	Course	Distance	Type	Stage winner
1	8 March	Achères to Carrières-sous-Poissy	171.2 km (106.4 mi)	Flat stage	Luke Lamperti (USA)
2	9 March	Épône to Montargis	187 km (116 mi)	Flat stage	Max Kanter (GER)
3	10 March	Cosne-Cours-sur-Loire to Pouilly-sur-Loire	23.5 km (14.6 mi)	Team time trial	INEOS Grenadiers (GBR)
4	11 March	Bourges to Uchon	195 km (121 mi)	Medium mountain stage	Jonas Vingegaard (DEN)
5	12 March	Cormoranche-sur-Saône to Colombier-le-Vieux	205.4 km (127.6 mi)	Hilly stage	Jonas Vingegaard (DEN)
6	13 March	Barbentane to Apt	179.3 km (111.4 mi)	Hilly stage	Harold Tejada (COL)
7	14 March	Nice to ~~Auron~~ Isola-Village	~~138.7 km (86.2 mi)~~ 47 km (29 mi)	Mountain stage	Dorian Godon (FRA)
8	15 March	Nice to Nice	145 km (90 mi)	Medium mountain stage	Lenny Martinez (FRA)
Total			1,153.4 km (716.7 mi)		

== Stages ==
=== Stage 1 ===
8 March 2026 — Achères to Carrières-sous-Poissy, 171.2 km (106.4 mi)

Stage 1 Result (1–10)
Rank	Rider	Team	Time
1	Luke Lamperti (USA)	EF Education–EasyPost	3h 45' 17"
2	Vito Braet (BEL)	Lotto–Intermarché	+ 0"
3	Orluis Aular (VEN)	Movistar Team	+ 0"
4	Milan Fretin (BEL)	Cofidis	+ 0"
5	Biniam Girmay (ERI)	NSN Cycling Team	+ 0"
6	Jensen Plowright (AUS)	Alpecin–Premier Tech	+ 0"
7	Mike Teunissen (NED)	XDS Astana Team	+ 0"
8	Sakarias Koller Løland (NOR)	Uno-X Mobility	+ 0"
9	Axel Zingle (FRA)	Visma–Lease a Bike	+ 0"
10	Robert Donaldson (GBR)	Team Jayco–AlUla	+ 0"

General classification after Stage 1 (1–10)
Rank	Rider	Team	Time
1	Luke Lamperti (USA)	EF Education–EasyPost	3h 45' 07"
2	Vito Braet (BEL)	Lotto–Intermarché	+ 4"
3	Orluis Aular (VEN)	Movistar Team	+ 6"
4	Casper Pedersen (DEN)	Soudal–Quick-Step	+ 6"
5	Milan Fretin (BEL)	Cofidis	+ 10"
6	Biniam Girmay (ERI)	NSN Cycling Team	+ 10"
7	Jensen Plowright (AUS)	Alpecin–Premier Tech	+ 10"
8	Mike Teunissen (NED)	XDS Astana Team	+ 10"
9	Sakarias Koller Løland (NOR)	Uno-X Mobility	+ 10"
10	Axel Zingle (FRA)	Visma–Lease a Bike	+ 10"

=== Stage 2 ===
9 March 2026 – Épône to Montargis, 187 km (116 mi)

Stage 2 Result (1–10)
Rank	Rider	Team	Time
1	Max Kanter (GER)	XDS Astana Team	4h 25' 07"
2	Laurence Pithie (NZL)	Red Bull–Bora–Hansgrohe	+ 0"
3	Jasper Stuyven (BEL)	Soudal–Quick-Step	+ 0"
4	Dorian Godon (FRA)	INEOS Grenadiers	+ 0"
5	Luke Lamperti (USA)	EF Education–EasyPost	+ 0"
6	Rick Pluimers (NED)	Tudor Pro Cycling Team	+ 0"
7	Lewis Askey (GBR)	NSN Cycling Team	+ 0"
8	Tom Van Asbroeck (BEL)	NSN Cycling Team	+ 0"
9	Clément Russo (FRA)	Groupama–FDJ United	+ 0"
10	Anthony Turgis (FRA)	Team TotalEnergies	+ 0"

General classification after Stage 2 (1–10)
Rank	Rider	Team	Time
1	Luke Lamperti (USA)	EF Education–EasyPost	8h 10' 12"
2	Vito Braet (BEL)	Lotto–Intermarché	+ 0"
3	Laurence Pithie (NZL)	Red Bull–Bora–Hansgrohe	+ 6"
4	Jasper Stuyven (BEL)	Soudal–Quick-Step	+ 8"
5	Orluis Aular (VEN)	Movistar Team	+ 8"
6	Juan Ayuso (ESP)	Lidl–Trek	+ 8"
7	Casper Pedersen (DEN)	Soudal–Quick-Step	+ 8"
8	Dorian Godon (FRA)	INEOS Grenadiers	+ 12"
9	Anthony Turgis (FRA)	Team TotalEnergies	+ 12"
10	Mike Teunissen (NED)	XDS Astana Team	+ 12"

=== Stage 3 ===
10 March 2026 – Cosne-Cours-sur-Loire to Pouilly-sur-Loire, 23.5 km (14.6 mi) (TTT)

Stage 3 Result (1–10)
Rank	Team	Time
1	(United Kingdom) INEOS Grenadiers	26' 40"
2	(Germany) Lidl–Trek	+ 2"
3	(France) Decathlon CMA CGM	+ 11"
4	(Netherlands) Visma–Lease a Bike	+ 15"
5	(Germany) Red Bull–Bora–Hansgrohe	+ 20"
6	(United States) EF Education–EasyPost	+ 23"
7	(Spain) Movistar Team	+ 28"
8	(United Arab Emirates) UAE Team Emirates XRG	+ 37"
9	(France) Groupama–FDJ United	+ 41"
10	(France) Cofidis	+ 42"

General classification after Stage 3 (1–10)
Rank	Rider	Team	Time
1	Juan Ayuso (ESP)	Lidl–Trek	8h 37' 02"
2	Kévin Vauquelin (FRA)	INEOS Grenadiers	+ 2"
3	Oscar Onley (GBR)	INEOS Grenadiers	+ 3"
4	Daan Hoole (NED)	Decathlon CMA CGM	+ 13"
5	Bruno Armirail (FRA)	Visma–Lease a Bike	+ 17"
6	Davide Piganzoli (ITA)	Visma–Lease a Bike	+ 17"
7	Jonas Vingegaard (DEN)	Visma–Lease a Bike	+ 17"
8	Aleksandr Vlasov	Red Bull–Bora–Hansgrohe	+ 22"
9	Daniel Martínez (COL)	Red Bull–Bora–Hansgrohe	+ 22"
10	Laurence Pithie (NZL)	Red Bull–Bora–Hansgrohe	+ 24"

=== Stage 4 ===
11 March 2026 – Bourges to Uchon, 195 km (121 mi)

Stage 4 Result (1–10)
Rank	Rider	Team	Time
1	Jonas Vingegaard (DEN)	Visma–Lease a Bike	4h 16' 12"
2	Daniel Martínez (COL)	Red Bull–Bora–Hansgrohe	+ 41"
3	Tim van Dijke (NED)	Red Bull–Bora–Hansgrohe	+ 45"
4	Mick van Dijke (NED)	Red Bull–Bora–Hansgrohe	+ 1' 42"
5	Georg Steinhauser (GER)	EF Education–EasyPost	+ 2' 54"
6	Kévin Vauquelin (FRA)	INEOS Grenadiers	+ 3' 38"
7	Lenny Martinez (FRA)	Team Bahrain Victorious	+ 4' 02"
8	David Gaudu (FRA)	Groupama–FDJ United	+ 4' 20"
9	Jensen Plowright (AUS)	Alpecin–Premier Tech	+ 4' 55"
10	Marc Soler (ESP)	UAE Team Emirates XRG	+ 5' 07"

General classification after Stage 4 (1–10)
Rank	Rider	Team	Time
1	Jonas Vingegaard (DEN)	Visma–Lease a Bike	12h 53' 15"
2	Daniel Martínez (COL)	Red Bull–Bora–Hansgrohe	+ 52"
3	Georg Steinhauser (GER)	EF Education–EasyPost	+ 3' 20"
4	Kévin Vauquelin (FRA)	INEOS Grenadiers	+ 3' 39"
5	David Gaudu (FRA)	Groupama–FDJ United	+ 5' 02"
6	Lenny Martinez (FRA)	Team Bahrain Victorious	+ 5' 07"
7	Tim van Dijke (NED)	Red Bull–Bora–Hansgrohe	+ 5' 33"
8	Marc Soler (ESP)	UAE Team Emirates XRG	+ 5' 45"
9	Jensen Plowright (AUS)	Alpecin–Premier Tech	+ 6' 27"
10	Ion Izagirre (ESP)	Cofidis	+ 6' 32"

=== Stage 5 ===
12 March 2026 – Cormoranche-sur-Saône to Colombier-le-Vieux, 205.4 km (127.6 mi)

Stage 5 Result (1–10)
Rank	Rider	Team	Time
1	Jonas Vingegaard (DEN)	Visma–Lease a Bike	4h 29' 01"
2	Valentin Paret-Peintre (FRA)	Soudal–Quick-Step	+ 2' 02"
3	Harold Tejada (COL)	XDS Astana Team	+ 2' 20"
4	Lenny Martinez (FRA)	Team Bahrain Victorious	+ 2' 20"
5	Ion Izagirre (ESP)	Cofidis	+ 2' 20"
6	Daniel Martínez (COL)	Red Bull–Bora–Hansgrohe	+ 2' 20"
7	Kévin Vauquelin (FRA)	INEOS Grenadiers	+ 2' 20"
8	Georg Steinhauser (GER)	EF Education–EasyPost	+ 2' 20"
9	Mathys Rondel (FRA)	Tudor Pro Cycling Team	+ 2' 20"
10	Marc Soler (ESP)	UAE Team Emirates XRG	+ 2' 20"

General classification after Stage 5 (1–10)
Rank	Rider	Team	Time
1	Jonas Vingegaard (DEN)	Visma–Lease a Bike	17h 22' 06"
2	Daniel Martínez (COL)	Red Bull–Bora–Hansgrohe	+ 3' 22"
3	Georg Steinhauser (GER)	EF Education–EasyPost	+ 5' 50"
4	Kévin Vauquelin (FRA)	INEOS Grenadiers	+ 6' 09"
5	Lenny Martinez (FRA)	Team Bahrain Victorious	+ 7' 37"
6	Marc Soler (ESP)	UAE Team Emirates XRG	+ 8' 15"
7	Ion Izagirre (ESP)	Cofidis	+ 9' 02"
8	Mathys Rondel (FRA)	Tudor Pro Cycling Team	+ 10' 06"
9	Alex Baudin (FRA)	EF Education–EasyPost	+ 10' 16"
10	Oscar Onley (GBR)	INEOS Grenadiers	+ 11' 23"

=== Stage 6 ===
13 March 2026 – Barbentane to Apt, 179.3 km (111.4 mi)

Stage 6 Result (1–10)
Rank	Rider	Team	Time
1	Harold Tejada (COL)	XDS Astana Team	3h 54' 38"
2	Dorian Godon (FRA)	INEOS Grenadiers	+ 6"
3	Lewis Askey (GBR)	NSN Cycling Team	+ 6"
4	Bryan Coquard (FRA)	Cofidis	+ 6"
5	Matteo Trentin (ITA)	Tudor Pro Cycling Team	+ 6"
6	Laurence Pithie (NZL)	Red Bull–Bora–Hansgrohe	+ 6"
7	Kévin Vauquelin (FRA)	INEOS Grenadiers	+ 6"
8	Valentin Paret-Peintre (FRA)	Soudal–Quick-Step	+ 6"
9	Aleksandr Vlasov	Red Bull–Bora–Hansgrohe	+ 6"
10	Alex Baudin (FRA)	EF Education–EasyPost	+ 6"

General classification after Stage 6 (1–10)
Rank	Rider	Team	Time
1	Jonas Vingegaard (DEN)	Visma–Lease a Bike	21h 16' 50"
2	Daniel Martínez (COL)	Red Bull–Bora–Hansgrohe	+ 3' 22"
3	Georg Steinhauser (GER)	EF Education–EasyPost	+ 5' 50"
4	Kévin Vauquelin (FRA)	INEOS Grenadiers	+ 6' 09"
5	Lenny Martinez (FRA)	Team Bahrain Victorious	+ 7' 37"
6	Marc Soler (ESP)	UAE Team Emirates XRG	+ 8' 15"
7	Ion Izagirre (ESP)	Cofidis	+ 9' 02"
8	Mathys Rondel (FRA)	Tudor Pro Cycling Team	+ 10' 06"
9	Alex Baudin (FRA)	EF Education–EasyPost	+ 10' 16"
10	Harold Tejada (COL)	XDS Astana Team	+ 11' 27"

=== Stage 7 ===
14 March 2026 – Nice to Isola-Village, 47 km (29 mi)

Stage 7 Result (1–10)
Rank	Rider	Team	Time
1	Dorian Godon (FRA)	INEOS Grenadiers	1h 01' 48"
2	Biniam Girmay (ERI)	NSN Cycling Team	+ 0"
3	Cees Bol (NED)	Decathlon CMA CGM	+ 0"
4	Laurence Pithie (NZL)	Red Bull–Bora–Hansgrohe	+ 0"
5	Luke Lamperti (USA)	EF Education–EasyPost	+ 0"
6	Mike Teunissen (NED)	XDS Astana Team	+ 0"
7	Jensen Plowright (AUS)	Alpecin–Premier Tech	+ 0"
8	Jasper Stuyven (BEL)	Soudal–Quick-Step	+ 0"
9	Matteo Trentin (ITA)	Tudor Pro Cycling Team	+ 0"
10	Samuel Watson (GBR)	INEOS Grenadiers	+ 0"

General classification after Stage 7 (1–10)
Rank	Rider	Team	Time
1	Jonas Vingegaard (DEN)	Visma–Lease a Bike	22h 18' 38"
2	Daniel Martínez (COL)	Red Bull–Bora–Hansgrohe	+ 3' 22"
3	Georg Steinhauser (GER)	EF Education–EasyPost	+ 5' 50"
4	Kévin Vauquelin (FRA)	INEOS Grenadiers	+ 6' 09"
5	Lenny Martinez (FRA)	Team Bahrain Victorious	+ 7' 37"
6	Marc Soler (ESP)	UAE Team Emirates XRG	+ 8' 15"
7	Ion Izagirre (ESP)	Cofidis	+ 9' 02"
8	Mathys Rondel (FRA)	Tudor Pro Cycling Team	+ 10' 06"
9	Alex Baudin (FRA)	EF Education–EasyPost	+ 10' 16"
10	Harold Tejada (COL)	XDS Astana Team	+ 11' 27"

=== Stage 8 ===
15 March 2026 – Nice to Nice, 145 km (90 mi)

Stage 8 Result (1–10)
Rank	Rider	Team	Time
1	Lenny Martinez (FRA)	Team Bahrain Victorious	3h 06' 43"
2	Jonas Vingegaard (DEN)	Visma–Lease a Bike	+ 0"
3	Harold Tejada (COL)	XDS Astana Team	+ 7"
4	Kévin Vauquelin (FRA)	INEOS Grenadiers	+ 7"
5	Alex Baudin (FRA)	EF Education–EasyPost	+ 7"
6	Georg Steinhauser (GER)	EF Education–EasyPost	+ 7"
7	Ion Izagirre (ESP)	Cofidis	+ 7"
8	Mathys Rondel (FRA)	Tudor Pro Cycling Team	+ 7"
9	Nicolas Vinokurov (KAZ)	XDS Astana Team	+ 44"
10	Marc Soler (ESP)	UAE Team Emirates XRG	+ 44"

General classification after Stage 8 (1–10)
Rank	Rider	Team	Time
1	Jonas Vingegaard (DEN)	Visma–Lease a Bike	25h 25' 11"
2	Daniel Martínez (COL)	Red Bull–Bora–Hansgrohe	+ 4' 23"
3	Georg Steinhauser (GER)	EF Education–EasyPost	+ 6' 07"
4	Kévin Vauquelin (FRA)	INEOS Grenadiers	+ 6' 24"
5	Lenny Martinez (FRA)	Team Bahrain Victorious	+ 7' 31"
6	Marc Soler (ESP)	UAE Team Emirates XRG	+ 9' 09"
7	Ion Izagirre (ESP)	Cofidis	+ 9' 19"
8	Mathys Rondel (FRA)	Tudor Pro Cycling Team	+ 10' 23"
9	Alex Baudin (FRA)	EF Education–EasyPost	+ 10' 33"
10	Harold Tejada (COL)	XDS Astana Team	+ 11' 40"

== Classification leadership table ==
Classification leadership by stage
Stage	Stage Winner	General classification	Points classification	Mountains classification	Young rider classification	Team classification	Combativity award
1	Luke Lamperti	Luke Lamperti	Luke Lamperti	Casper Pedersen	Luke Lamperti	NSN Cycling Team	Mathis Le Berre
2	Max Kanter	Luke Lamperti	Luke Lamperti	Casper Pedersen	Luke Lamperti	NSN Cycling Team	Daan Hoole
3	INEOS Grenadiers	Juan Ayuso	Luke Lamperti	Casper Pedersen	Juan Ayuso	INEOS Grenadiers	Not awarded
4	Jonas Vingegaard	Jonas Vingegaard	Luke Lamperti	Casper Pedersen	Georg Steinhauser	Red Bull–Bora–Hansgrohe	Tim van Dijke & Mick van Dijke
5	Jonas Vingegaard	Jonas Vingegaard	Luke Lamperti	Jonas Vingegaard	Georg Steinhauser	INEOS Grenadiers	Jonas Vingegaard
6	Harold Tejada	Jonas Vingegaard	Luke Lamperti	Jonas Vingegaard	Georg Steinhauser	INEOS Grenadiers	Joshua Tarling
7	Dorian Godon	Jonas Vingegaard	Dorian Godon	Jonas Vingegaard	Georg Steinhauser	INEOS Grenadiers	Tim Marsman
8	Lenny Martinez	Jonas Vingegaard	Jonas Vingegaard	Jonas Vingegaard	Georg Steinhauser	INEOS Grenadiers	Valentin Paret-Peintre
Final		Jonas Vingegaard	Jonas Vingegaard	Jonas Vingegaard	Georg Steinhauser	INEOS Grenadiers	Not awarded

== Classification standings ==
Legend
Denotes the winner of the general classification	Denotes the winner of the mountains classification
Denotes the winner of the points classification	Denotes the winner of the young rider classification
Denotes the winner of the team classification	Denotes the winner of the combativity award

=== General classification ===
Final general classification (1–10)
Rank	Rider	Team	Time
1	Jonas Vingegaard (DEN)	Visma–Lease a Bike	25h 25' 11"
2	Daniel Martínez (COL)	Red Bull–Bora–Hansgrohe	+ 4' 23"
3	Georg Steinhauser (GER)	EF Education–EasyPost	+ 6' 07"
4	Kévin Vauquelin (FRA)	INEOS Grenadiers	+ 6' 24"
5	Lenny Martinez (FRA)	Team Bahrain Victorious	+ 7' 31"
6	Marc Soler (ESP)	UAE Team Emirates XRG	+ 9' 09"
7	Ion Izagirre (ESP)	Cofidis	+ 9' 19"
8	Mathys Rondel (FRA)	Tudor Pro Cycling Team	+ 10' 23"
9	Alex Baudin (FRA)	EF Education–EasyPost	+ 10' 33"
10	Harold Tejada (COL)	XDS Astana Team	+ 11' 40"

=== Points classification ===
Final points classification (1–10)
Rank	Rider	Team	Points
1	Jonas Vingegaard (DEN)	Visma–Lease a Bike	58
2	Dorian Godon (FRA)	INEOS Grenadiers	55
3	Harold Tejada (COL)	XDS Astana Team	45
4	Laurence Pithie (NZL)	Red Bull–Bora–Hansgrohe	44
5	Lenny Martinez (FRA)	Team Bahrain Victorious	37
6	Kévin Vauquelin (FRA)	INEOS Grenadiers	33
7	Vito Braet (BEL)	Lotto–Intermarché	32
8	Lewis Askey (GBR)	NSN Cycling Team	32
9	Daniel Martínez (COL)	Red Bull–Bora–Hansgrohe	23
10	Jasper Stuyven (BEL)	Soudal–Quick-Step	23

=== Mountains classification ===
Final mountains classification (1–10)
Rank	Rider	Team	Points
1	Jonas Vingegaard (DEN)	Visma–Lease a Bike	44
2	Valentin Paret-Peintre (FRA)	Soudal–Quick-Step	27
3	Casper Pedersen (DEN)	Soudal–Quick-Step	18
4	Mathis Le Berre (FRA)	Team TotalEnergies	14
5	Lenny Martinez (FRA)	Team Bahrain Victorious	12
6	Harold Tejada (COL)	XDS Astana Team	11
7	Mick van Dijke (NED)	Red Bull–Bora–Hansgrohe	10
8	Aleksandr Vlasov	Red Bull–Bora–Hansgrohe	9
9	Igor Arrieta (ESP)	UAE Team Emirates XRG	8
10	Daniel Martínez (COL)	Red Bull–Bora–Hansgrohe	8

=== Young rider classification ===
Final young rider classification (1–10)
Rank	Rider	Team	Time
1	Georg Steinhauser (GER)	EF Education–EasyPost	25h 31' 18"
2	Kévin Vauquelin (FRA)	INEOS Grenadiers	+ 17"
3	Lenny Martinez (FRA)	Team Bahrain Victorious	+ 1' 24"
4	Mathys Rondel (FRA)	Tudor Pro Cycling Team	+ 4' 16"
5	Alex Baudin (FRA)	EF Education–EasyPost	+ 4' 26"
6	Mattéo Vercher (FRA)	Team TotalEnergies	+ 7' 02"
7	Valentin Paret-Peintre (FRA)	Soudal–Quick-Step	+ 20' 07"
8	Nicolas Vinokurov (KAZ)	XDS Astana Team	+ 35' 54"
9	Carlos Rodríguez (ESP)	INEOS Grenadiers	+ 37' 04"
10	Joshua Tarling (GBR)	INEOS Grenadiers	+ 37' 50"

=== Teams classification ===
Final team classification (1–10)
Rank	Team	Time
1	(United Kingdom) INEOS Grenadiers	77h 00' 14"
2	(Germany) Red Bull–Bora–Hansgrohe	+ 3' 25"
3	(Netherlands) Visma–Lease a Bike	+ 4' 39"
4	(United States) EF Education–EasyPost	+ 23' 35"
5	(France) Groupama–FDJ United	+ 28' 29"
6	(United Arab Emirates) UAE Team Emirates XRG	+ 35' 41"
7	(Kazakhstan) XDS Astana Team	+ 44' 30"
8	(France) Team TotalEnergies	+ 55' 27"
9	(Switzerland) Tudor Pro Cycling Team	+ 55' 42"
10	(Belgium) Soudal–Quick-Step	+ 1h 16' 22"
