= Harold Tejada =

Colombian cyclist

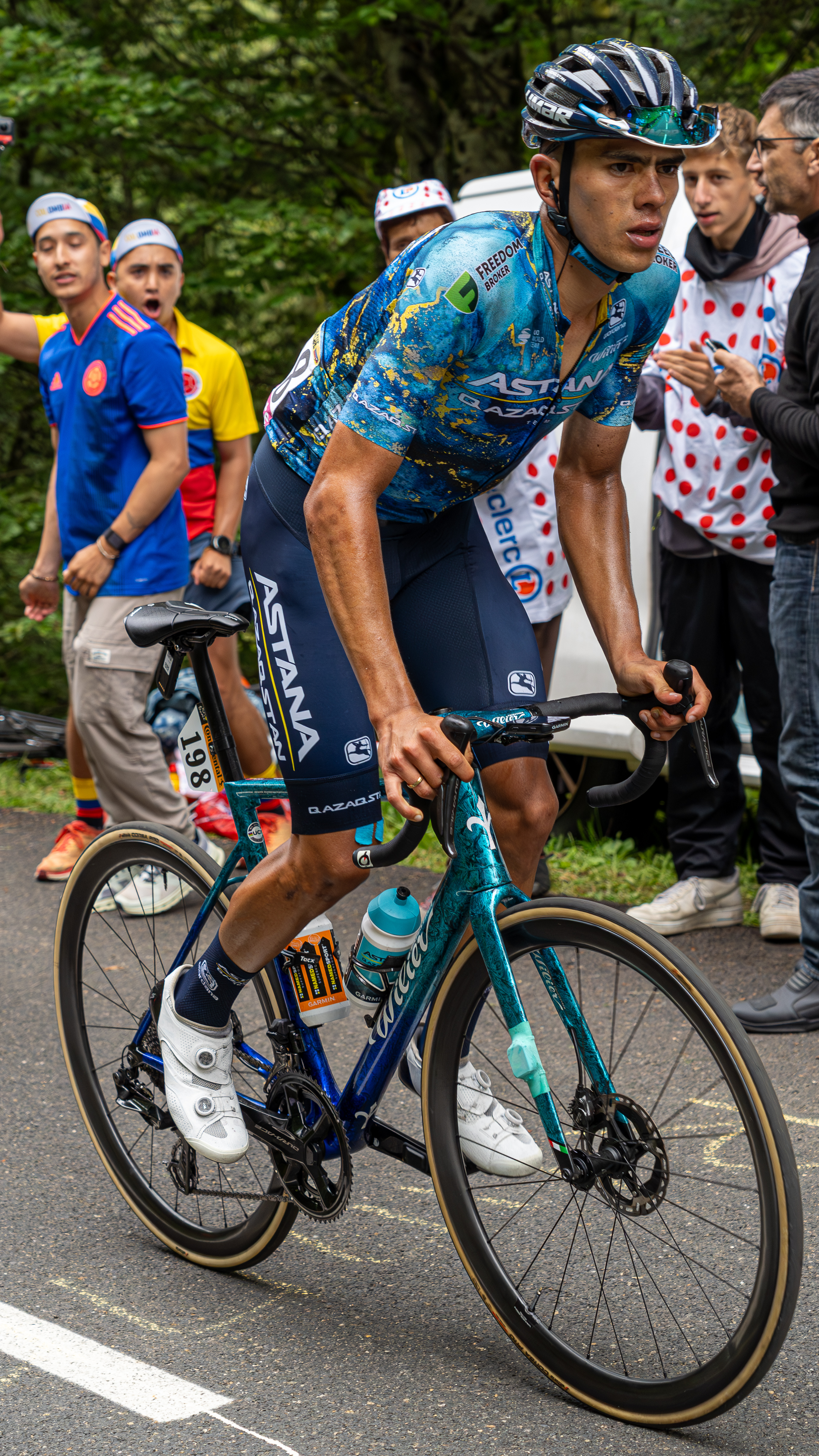
- Tejada at the 2023 Tour de France

Personal information
- Full name: Harold Alfonso Tejada Canacue
- Born: 27 April 1997 (age 29) Pitalito, Colombia
- Height: 1.8 m (5 ft 11 in)
- Weight: 63 kg (139 lb)

Cycling career
- Sport: Cycling
- Current team: XDS Astana Team
- Discipline: Road
- Role: Rider
- Rider type: Climber

Professional teams
- 2017–2018: EPM
- 2019: Medellín
- 2020–: Astana

Harold Alfonso Tejada Canacue (born 27 April 1997) is a Colombian road cyclist, who currently rides for UCI WorldTeam XDS Astana Team. In August 2020, he was named in the startlist for the 2020 Tour de France.

== Major results ==
2013
2nd Time trial, National Junior Road Championships
2015
5th Road race, Pan American Junior Road Championships
2019
National Under-23 Road Championships

1st Road race
1st Time trial

1st Stage 7 Tour de l'Avenir
4th Overall Vuelta a la Independencia Nacional

1st Young rider classification

2020
6th Mont Ventoux Dénivelé Challenge
2023
3rd Overall Tour of Turkey
8th Gran Piemonte
10th Overall Tour de Suisse
2024 (1 pro win)
6th Overall Tour Colombia

1st Stage 2

2025
5th Time trial, National Road Championships
8th Overall Paris–Nice
9th Overall UAE Tour
2026 (1)
4th Overall UAE Tour
10th Overall Vuelta a España
10th Overall Paris–Nice

1st Stage 6

=== Grand Tour general classification results timeline ===
Grand Tour	2020	2021	2022	2023	2024	2025	2026
Giro d'Italia	—	36	56	—	—	—	—
Tour de France	45	—	—	34	74	44	26
Vuelta a España	—	—	65	—	40	—	10

Legend
—	Did not compete
DNF	Did not finish
