= Juan Felipe Rodríguez =

Colombian cyclist

Personal information
- Full name: Juan Felipe Rodríguez Contreras
- Born: 5 November 2003 (age 22) Tenjo, Colombia

Cycling career
- Sport: Cycling
- Current team: EF Education–EasyPost
- Discipline: Road
- Role: Rider
- Rider type: Climber

Amateur teams
- 2022: Camacho Premiun
- 2022: Alcadía La Vega
- 2023: Domore–Mercados Cash
- 2024: Arroz Sonora–4WD Rentacar
- 2024: Alcaldía de Manizales

Professional teams
- 2023: Pío Rico–Alcaldía La Vega
- 2025: Team Sistecredito
- 2026: EF Education–Aevolo
- 2026–: EF Education–EasyPost

Juan Felipe Rodríguez Contreras (born 5 November 2003) is a Colombian cyclist, who currently rides for UCI WorldTeam EF Education–EasyPost.

== Major results ==
2023
1st GP Internacional de Ciclismo de Santa Catarina
2025
1st Overall Vuelta de la Juventud de Colombia

1st Points classification

3rd Overall Ronde de l'Isard

1st Stage 4

2026
3rd Road race, National Championships
3rd Overall Tour of Rhodes
4th Overall Alpes Isère Tour
