= Young rider classification in the Vuelta a España =

Secondary classification in the Spanish cycling grand tour

White jersey
- Sport: Road Cycling
- Competition: Vuelta a España
- Awarded for: Young rider classification
- Local name: Jersey Blanco

History
- First award: 2017
- Editions: 10 (as of 2026)
- First winner: Miguel Ángel López (COL)
- Most wins: Enric Mas (ESP) (2 wins)
- Most recent: Oscar Onley (GBR)

The young rider classification is one of the primary awards in the Vuelta a España cycling stage race. This classification is awarded based on the young rider with the lowest cumulative time (the same methodology as the general classification). The jersey is also awarded alongside the points and mountains classifications. In the 2017 and the 2018 editions, the winner only wore a red number bib as the white jersey was awarded to the winner of the Combination classification.

== Winners ==
Year	Rider	Team	GC
2017	Miguel Ángel López (COL)	Astana	8
2018	Enric Mas (ESP)	Quick-Step Floors	2
2019	Tadej Pogačar (SLO)	UAE Team Emirates	3
2020	Enric Mas (ESP)	Movistar Team	5
2021	Gino Mäder (SUI)	Team Bahrain Victorious	5
2022	Remco Evenepoel (BEL)	Quick-Step Alpha Vinyl Team	1
2023	Juan Ayuso (ESP)	UAE Team Emirates	4
2024	Mattias Skjelmose (DEN)	Lidl–Trek	5
2025	Matthew Riccitello (USA)	Israel–Premier Tech	5
2026	Oscar Onley (GBR)	Netcompany INEOS	6

=== By nationality ===
Vuelta a España young rider classification winners by nationality
Country	No. of winning cyclists	No. of wins
Spain	2	3
Colombia	1	1
Slovenia	1	1
Switzerland	1	1
Belgium	1	1
Denmark	1	1
United Kingdom	1	1
United States	1	1
