= Jakob Omrzel =

Slovenian cyclist (born 2006)

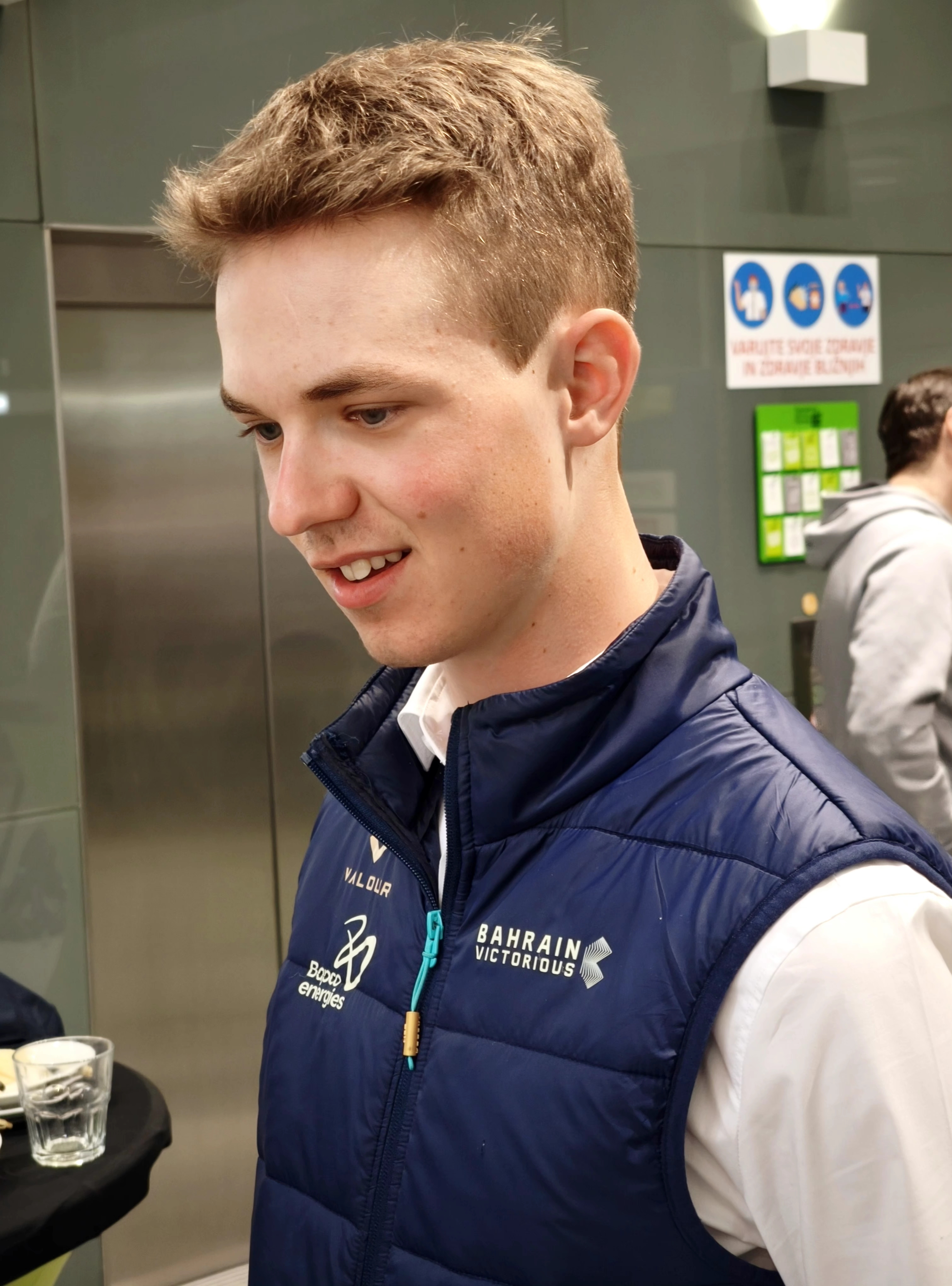
- Omrzel at the 2026 Tour of Slovenia press conference

Personal information
- Born: 21 March 2006 (age 20) Novo Mesto, Slovenia

Cycling career
- Sport: Cycling
- Current team: Team Bahrain Victorious
- Discipline: Road
- Role: Rider

Amateur team
- 2023–2024: Adria Mobil Juniors

Professional team
- 2025–: Team Bahrain Victorious

Major wins
- Grand Tours Vuelta a España 1 individual stage (2026) One-day races and Classics National Road Race Championships (2025)

Jakob Omrzel (born 21 March 2006) is a Slovenian cyclist who rides for UCI WorldTeam Team Bahrain Victorious.

As a junior, Omrzel is considered one of Slovenia's biggest cycling prospects, as a two-time national road race champion and winner of Paris–Roubaix Juniors. In 2024, Omrzel suffered a significant crash while riding in the Giro della Lunigiana, colliding with a signalman and requiring resuscitation.

Omrzel signed a contract with Team Bahrain Victorious in late 2025 to turn professional. He participated in the 2026 Vuelta a España where he won a stage after dropping the other breakaway riders on the last climb.

== Major results ==
2023
National Junior Road Championships

1st Road race
1st Time trial

2024
National Junior Road Championships

1st Road race
2nd Time trial

1st Paris–Roubaix Juniors
3rd Overall Tour du Pays de Vaud
4th Overall Ain Bugey Valromey Tour
2025 (1 pro win)
1st Road race, National Road Championships
1st Overall Giro Next Gen

1st Young rider classification

1st Mountains classification, International Tour of Rhodes
2nd Giro del Belvedere
4th Overall Tour of Slovenia

1st Young rider classification

5th Trofeo Piva
7th Overall CRO Race

1st Young rider classification

7th Gran Premio Palio del Recioto
9th Overall Circuit des Ardennes
2026 (1)
National Road Championships

2nd Road race
3rd Time trial

3rd Overall Tour of Slovenia

1st Young rider classification

6th Overall Tour of the Alps
7th Overall Vuelta a España

1st Stage 12

=== Grand Tour general classification results timeline ===
Grand Tour	2026
Giro d'Italia	—
Tour de France	—
Vuelta a España	7
