= Oscar Onley =

British cyclist (born 2002)

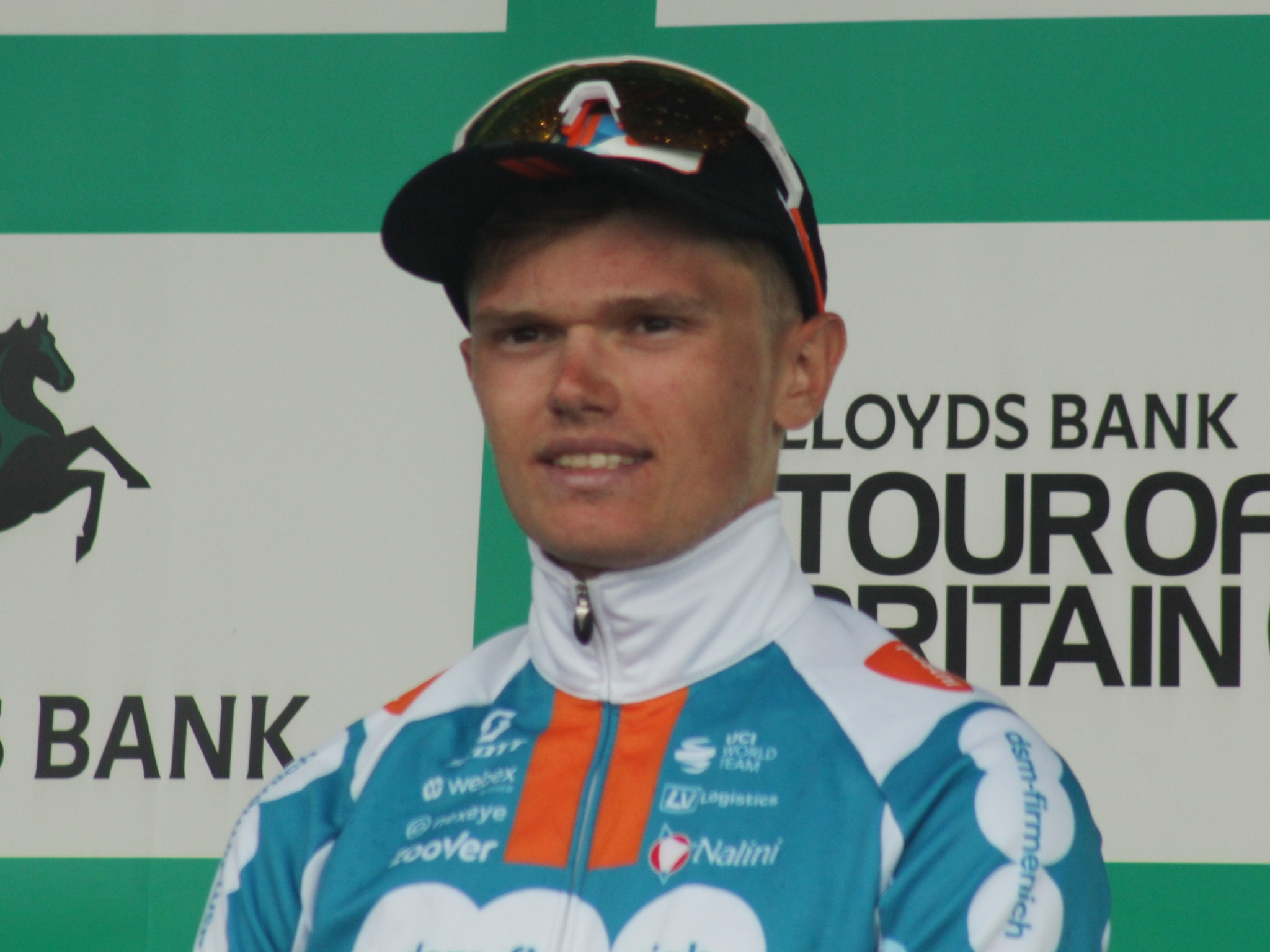
- Onley at the 2024 Tour of Britain

Personal information
- Full name: Oscar Edgar Onley
- Born: 13 October 2002 (age 24) London, United Kingdom
- Height: 1.73 m (5 ft 8 in)

Cycling career
- Sport: Cycling
- Current team: Netcompany–Ineos
- Discipline: Road
- Role: Rider
- Rider type: Climber

Amateur teams
- 2019: Spokes Racing
- 2019–2020: Van Rysel–AG2R La Mondiale

Professional teams
- 2021–2022: Development Team Sunweb
- 2023–2025: Team dsm–firmenich
- 2026–: Netcompany INEOS

Major wins
- Grand Tours Vuelta a España Young rider classification (2026) 1 TTT stage (2023)

Oscar Edgar Onley (born 13 October 2002) is a Scottish cyclist who, since January 2026, has ridden for UCI WorldTeam Netcompany–Ineos.

== Early life ==
Onley was born in London, England but grew up in Kelso in the Scottish Borders. He attended Longridge Towers School and Kelso High School.

He started cycling at the age of ten and joined his local club, the Kelso Wheelers. However, his preferred sport as a child was cross-country running. He began to take cycling more seriously after turning 18 and joining the junior ranks; Onley has stated that he simply preferred the training for cycling compared to running.

== Career ==
In 2019, Onley started a two-year stint with the Van Rysel-AG2R La Mondiale development team, though his 2020 season was interrupted by the COVID-19 pandemic. He then signed with Development Team DSM for the start of 2021. Though he did not achieve any significant results in his initial season with the squad, his 2022 season was very strong. This included a stand-out performance at the CRO Race, where he closely competed with that year's Tour de France winner, Jonas Vingegaard, on a number of stages. He ultimately finished third overall in the General Classification and won the Young Rider Classification. Onley was supported by the Rayner Foundation in 2021 and 2022, during his time with Development Team DSM.

After spending two seasons with the development squad, he joined UCI WorldTeam Team Picnic–PostNL in 2023, having signed a five-year contract with the team in late 2022. In 2023, he competed in his first Grand Tour, the Vuelta a España, where he was part of the winning team on the Stage One team time trial. Onley abandoned the race during the following stage after sustaining a broken collarbone in a crash in wet conditions.

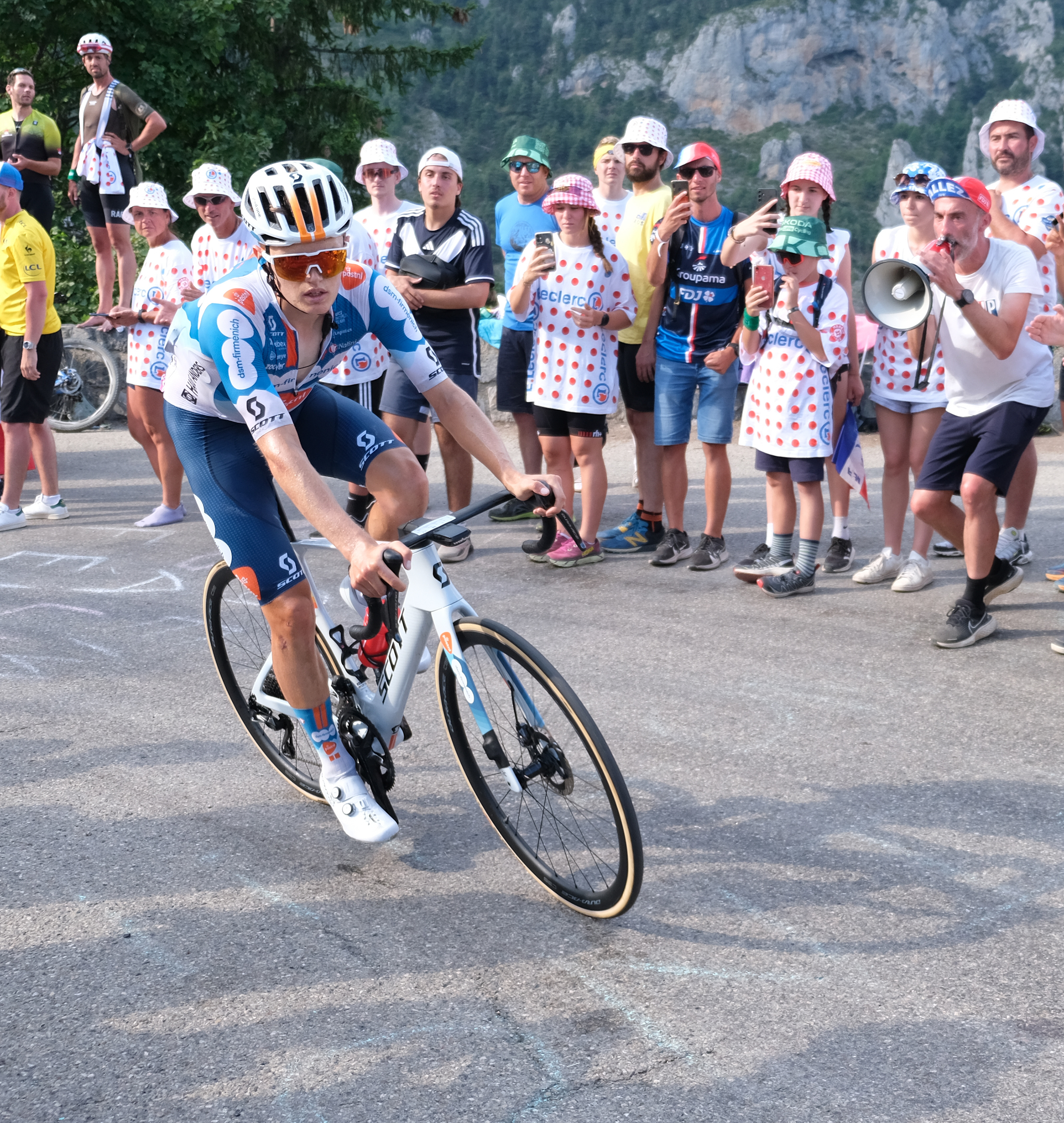
Onley at the 2024 Tour de France

The following January, Onley took his first individual professional win in an uphill finish on Stage Five of the 2024 Tour Down Under, ultimately finishing fourth overall.

Onley competed in the 2024 Tour de France, his second Grand Tour. On Stage 17, he was involved in the day's breakaway and finished fifth on the stage. He also managed to be in the breakaway on the following stage, and was part of the nine-man group that first reached the foot of the Col de la Bonette, but was unable to stay with the leading riders during the ascent. Onley finished 39th overall in the General Classification and 10th in the Young Rider Classification.

In September he raced in the Tour of Britain, the first stage of which started and finished in his hometown, Kelso. He finished the Tour second overall and won the Youth Classification, which he had been leading since Stage Two.

On 17 September 2024 it was announced that Onley would represent Great Britain in the elite men's road race at the 2024 UCI Road World Championships in Zurich. He finished in 16th place with a time of 6:31:22, 3 minutes and 52 seconds behind winner Tadej Pogačar, making him the highest-placed British rider.

On 27 July 2025, Onley placed fourth in the 2025 Tour de France, finishing 12 minutes and 12 seconds behind the winner Tadej Pogačar.

In December 2025, Onley signed for Netcompany INEOS from the beginning of the 2026 season, after agreeing a transfer from Team Picnic–PostNL.

== Major results ==
2019
5th Chrono des Nations Juniors
7th Overall Ain Bugey Valromey Tour
8th Overall Aubel–Thimister–Stavelot

1st Stage 2a (TTT)

2020
1st Trophee des Grimpeurs Col de Peyra Taillade
2021
3rd Time trial, National Under-23 Road Championships
2022
Giro della Valle d'Aosta

1st Points classification
1st Stage 5

3rd Overall CRO Race

1st Young rider classification

5th Overall Circuit des Ardennes
7th Overall Sazka Tour
9th Overall Giro Ciclistico d'Italia
2023
1st Stage 1 (TTT) Vuelta a España
1st Young rider classification, Volta ao Algarve
2nd Overall Alpes Isère Tour
6th Overall Tour de Hongrie
10th Overall Tour de Pologne
2024 (1 pro win)
2nd Overall Tour of Guangxi
2nd Overall Tour of Britain

1st Young rider classification

3rd GP Miguel Induráin
4th Overall Tour Down Under

1st Stage 5

8th Overall Tour de Suisse
10th Overall Tour de Pologne
2025 (1)
3rd Overall Tour de Suisse

1st Stage 5

4th Overall Tour de France
4th Overall Tour Down Under
4th Overall Tour of Britain
5th Overall UAE Tour
9th Overall Tour of the Basque Country
9th Cadel Evans Great Ocean Road Race
2026 (1)
1st Stage 3 (TTT) Paris–Nice
2nd Overall Vuelta a Burgos

1st Points classification
1st Mountains classification
1st Stage 2

3rd Giro dell'Emilia
4th Overall Volta ao Algarve
6th Overall Vuelta a España

1st Young rider classification

=== General classification results timeline ===
Grand Tour general classification results
Grand Tour	2023	2024	2025	2026
Giro d'Italia	—	—	—	—
Tour de France	—	39	4	—
Vuelta a España	DNF	—	—	6
Major stage race general classification results
Race	2023	2024	2025	2026
Paris–Nice	—	—	—	DNF
Tirreno–Adriatico	—	—	—	—
Volta a Catalunya	39	—	—	12
Tour of the Basque Country	—	19	9	—
Tour de Romandie	23	—	16	DNF
Critérium du Dauphiné	40	—	—	DNF
Tour de Suisse	—	8	3	—

Legend
—	Did not compete
DNF	Did not finish
