= 2026 in men's road cycling =

2026 in men's road cycling is about the 2026 men's bicycle races ruled by the UCI, national federations and the 2026 UCI Men's Teams.
