= Alessandro Romele =

Italian cyclist (born 2003)

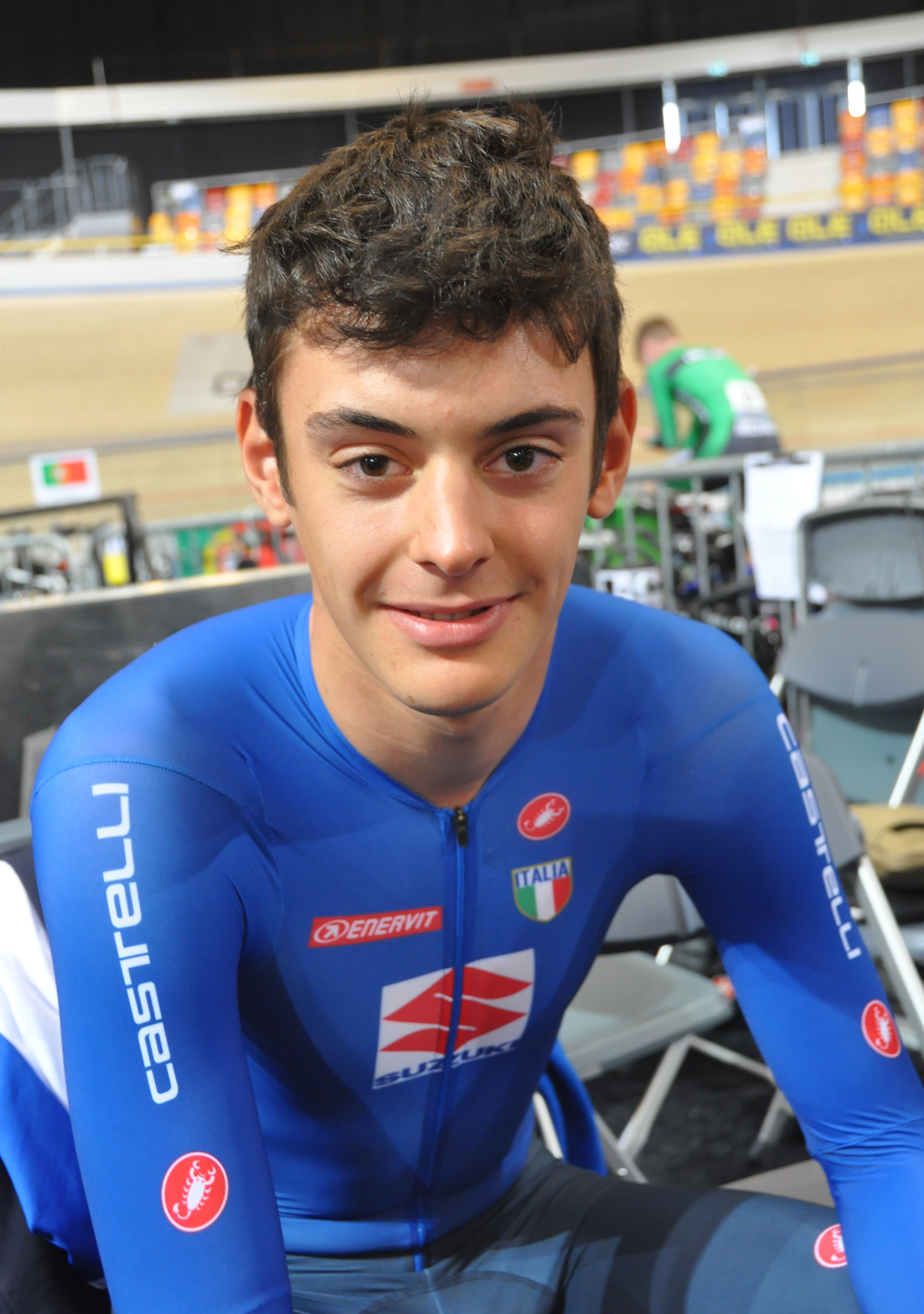
- Romele in 2021

Personal information
- Born: 30 August 2003 (age 23) Iseo, Lombardy, Italy
- Height: 1.86 m (6 ft 1 in)

Cycling career
- Sport: Cycling
- Current team: XDS Astana Team
- Discipline: Road
- Role: Rider

Amateur team
- 2020–2021: Ciclistica Trevigliese

Professional teams
- 2022–2023: Team Colpack–Ballan
- 2024: Astana Qazaqstan Development Team
- 2025–: XDS Astana Team

Alessandro Romele (born 30 August 2003) is an Italian road and track cyclist, who currently rides for UCI WorldTeam XDS Astana Team.

== Major results ==
2020
10th Overall Visegrad 4 Juniors
2021
National Junior Road Championships

1st Road race
3rd Time trial

3rd Trofeo Guido Dorigo
2022
2nd Piccola Sanremo
4th Road race, National Under-23 Road Championships
2023
1st Gran Premio della Liberazione
1st Coppa Zappi
1st Costa Dei Trulli
1st Stage 6 Giro Next Gen
5th Time trial, National Under-23 Road Championships
5th Trofeo Città di San Vendemiano
9th Paris–Tours Espoirs
2024
2nd Overall Tour of İstanbul
2nd Overall Tour of Rhodes

1st Young rider classification
1st Stages 2 & 3

2nd Cupa Max Ausnit
4th International Rhodes Grand Prix
6th Overall Tour of Szeklerland
6th Coppa Città di San Daniele
2025
8th Le Samyn
10th Bredene Koksijde Classic
2026
3rd Road race, National Road Championships
4th Coppa Bernocchi
