= 2025 Étoile de Bessèges =

2025 UCI Europe Tour

Race details
- Dates: 5–9 February 2025
- Stages: 5
- Distance: 590.745 km (367.1 mi)
- Winning time: 13h 20' 40"

Results
Jersey awarded to the overall winner	Winner	Kévin Vauquelin (FRA)	(Arkéa–B&B Hotels)
	Second	Dylan Teuns (BEL)	(Cofidis)
	Third	Kevin Geniets (LUX)	(Groupama–FDJ)
Jersey awarded to the points classification winner	Points	Kévin Vauquelin (FRA)	(Arkéa–B&B Hotels)
Jersey awarded to the mountains classification winner	Mountains	Victor Vercouillie (BEL)	(Team Flanders–Baloise)
Jersey awarded to the youth classification winner	Youth	Clément Izquierdo (FRA)	(Cofidis)
	Team	(France) Groupama–FDJ	

The 2025 Étoile de Bessèges – Tour du Gard (transl. Star of Bessèges – Tour of Gard) was a road cycling stage race that took place between 5 and 9 February 2025 almost entirely within the French department of Gard. The race was rated as a category 2.1 event on the 2025 UCI Europe Tour calendar and was the 55th edition of the Étoile de Bessèges.

== Teams ==
Ten UCI WorldTeams, seven UCI ProTeams, and four UCI Continental teams make up the 21 teams that participated in the race.

UCI WorldTeams

- Alpecin–Deceuninck
- Arkéa–B&B Hotels
- Cofidis
- Decathlon–AG2R La Mondiale
- EF Education–EasyPost
- Groupama–FDJ
- Ineos Grenadiers
- Lidl–Trek
- Red Bull–Bora–Hansgrohe
- Soudal–Quick-Step

UCI ProTeams

- Equipo Kern Pharma
- Lotto
- Team Flanders–Baloise
- Team TotalEnergies
- Unibet Tietema Rockets
- Uno-X Mobility
- Wagner Bazin WB

UCI Continental Teams

- CIC–U–Nantes
- Nice Métropole Côte d'Azur
- St. Michel–Preference Home–Auber93
- Van Rysel–Roubaix

== Route ==
Stage characteristics and winners
Stage	Date	Course	Distance	Type	Stage winner
1	5 February	Bellegarde to Bellegarde	159.07 km (98.84 mi)	Hilly stage	Paul Magnier (FRA)
2	6 February	Domessargues to Marguerittes	165.83 km (103.04 mi)	Hilly stage	Søren Wærenskjold (NOR)
3	7 February	Bessèges to Bessèges	~~164.05 km (101.94 mi)~~ 136.2 km (84.6 mi)	Hilly stage	Arnaud De Lie (BEL)
4	8 February	Vauvert to Le Mont Bouquet	~~155.73 km (96.77 mi)~~ 119 km (74 mi)	Hilly stage	Kévin Vauquelin (FRA)
5	9 February	Alès to Alès	10.645 km (6.614 mi)	Individual time trial	Kévin Vauquelin (FRA)
Total			590.745 km (367.072 mi)		

== Stages ==
=== Stage 1 ===
5 February 2025 – Bellegarde to Bellegarde, 159.07 km (98.84 mi)

Stage 1 Result
Rank	Rider	Team	Time
1	Paul Magnier (FRA)	Soudal–Quick-Step	3h 33' 29"
2	Jordi Meeus (BEL)	Red Bull–Bora–Hansgrohe	+ 0"
3	Marijn van den Berg (NED)	EF Education–EasyPost	+ 0"
4	Maxim Van Gils (BEL)	Red Bull–Bora–Hansgrohe	+ 0"
5	Timo Kielich (BEL)	Alpecin–Deceuninck	+ 0"
6	Sandy Dujardin (FRA)	Team TotalEnergies	+ 0"
7	Arnaud De Lie (BEL)	Lotto	+ 2"
8	Jan Tratnik (SLO)	Red Bull–Bora–Hansgrohe	+ 2"
9	Axel Laurance (FRA)	Ineos Grenadiers	+ 2"
10	Lukáš Kubiš (SVK)	Unibet Tietema Rockets	+ 2"

General classification after Stage 1
Rank	Rider	Team	Time
1	Paul Magnier (FRA)	Soudal–Quick-Step	3h 33' 19"
2	Jordi Meeus (BEL)	Red Bull–Bora–Hansgrohe	+ 4"
3	Marijn van den Berg (NED)	EF Education–EasyPost	+ 6"
4	Maxim Van Gils (BEL)	Red Bull–Bora–Hansgrohe	+ 10"
5	Timo Kielich (BEL)	Alpecin–Deceuninck	+ 10"
6	Sandy Dujardin (FRA)	Team TotalEnergies	+ 10"
7	Arnaud De Lie (BEL)	Lotto	+ 12"
8	Jan Tratnik (SLO)	Red Bull–Bora–Hansgrohe	+ 12"
9	Axel Laurance (FRA)	Ineos Grenadiers	+ 12"
10	Lukáš Kubiš (SVK)	Unibet Tietema Rockets	+ 12"

=== Stage 2 ===
6 February 2025 – Domessargues to Marguerittes, 165.83 km (103.04 mi)

Stage 2 Result
Rank	Rider	Team	Time
1	Søren Wærenskjold (NOR)	Uno-X Mobility	3h 57' 54"
2	Arnaud Démare (FRA)	Arkéa–B&B Hotels	+ 0"
3	Paul Magnier (FRA)	Soudal–Quick-Step	+ 0"
4	Jordi Meeus (BEL)	Red Bull–Bora–Hansgrohe	+ 0"
5	Axel Laurance (FRA)	Ineos Grenadiers	+ 0"
6	Paul Penhoët (FRA)	Groupama–FDJ	+ 0"
7	Madis Mihkels (EST)	EF Education–EasyPost	+ 0"
8	Sandy Dujardin (FRA)	Team TotalEnergies	+ 0"
9	Sam Bennett (IRL)	Decathlon–AG2R La Mondiale	+ 0"
10	Axel Huens (FRA)	Unibet Tietema Rockets	+ 0"

General classification after Stage 2
Rank	Rider	Team	Time
1	Paul Magnier (FRA)	Soudal–Quick-Step	7h 31' 09"
2	Jordi Meeus (BEL)	Red Bull–Bora–Hansgrohe	+ 8"
3	Marijn van den Berg (NED)	EF Education–EasyPost	+ 10"
4	Sandy Dujardin (FRA)	Team TotalEnergies	+ 14"
5	Timo Kielich (BEL)	Alpecin–Deceuninck	+ 14"
6	Axel Laurance (FRA)	Ineos Grenadiers	+ 16"
7	Paul Penhoët (FRA)	Groupama–FDJ	+ 16"
8	Valentin Tabellion (FRA)	Van Rysel–Roubaix	+ 16"
9	Lukáš Kubiš (SVK)	Unibet Tietema Rockets	+ 16"
10	Kévin Vauquelin (FRA)	Arkéa–B&B Hotels	+ 16"

=== Stage 3 ===
7 February 2025 – Bessèges to Bessèges, ~~164.05 km (101.94 mi)~~ 136.2 km (84.6 mi)

Stage 3 Result
Rank	Rider	Team	Time
1	Arnaud De Lie (BEL)	Lotto	2h 27' 45"
2	Arnaud Démare (FRA)	Arkéa–B&B Hotels	+ 0"
3	Paul Penhoët (FRA)	Groupama–FDJ	+ 0"
4	Ronan Augé (FRA)	CIC–U–Nantes	+ 0"
5	Alan Riou (FRA)	St. Michel–Preference Home–Auber93	+ 0"
6	Théo Delacroix (FRA)	St. Michel–Preference Home–Auber93	+ 0"
7	Giacomo Villa (ITA)	Wagner Bazin WB	+ 0"
8	Damien Touzé (FRA)	Cofidis	+ 0"
9	Elias Maris (BEL)	Team Flanders–Baloise	+ 0"
10	Valentin Tabellion (FRA)	Van Rysel–Roubaix	+ 0"

General classification after Stage 3
Rank	Rider	Team	Time
1	Arnaud De Lie (BEL)	Lotto	9h 59' 00"
2	Paul Penhoët (FRA)	Groupama–FDJ	+ 6"
3	Sandy Dujardin (FRA)	Team TotalEnergies	+ 8"
4	Valentin Tabellion (FRA)	Van Rysel–Roubaix	+ 10"
5	Kévin Vauquelin (FRA)	Arkéa–B&B Hotels	+ 10"
6	Pierre Latour (FRA)	Team TotalEnergies	+ 10"
7	Kevin Geniets (LUX)	Groupama–FDJ	+ 10"
8	Vincent Van Hemelen (BEL)	Team Flanders–Baloise	+ 13"
9	Alex Colman (BEL)	Team Flanders–Baloise	+ 14"
10	Dylan Vandenstorme (BEL)	Team Flanders–Baloise	+ 14"

=== Stage 4 ===
8 February 2025 – Vauvert to Le Mont Bouquet, ~~155.73 km (96.77 mi)~~ 119 km (74 mi)

Stage 4 Result
Rank	Rider	Team	Time
1	Kévin Vauquelin (FRA)	Arkéa–B&B Hotels	3h 06' 33"
2	Thomas Champion (FRA)	St. Michel–Preference Home–Auber93	+ 26"
3	Nicolas Breuillard (FRA)	St. Michel–Preference Home–Auber93	+ 41"
4	Kevin Geniets (LUX)	Groupama–FDJ	+ 47"
5	Dylan Teuns (BEL)	Cofidis	+ 47"
6	Théo Delacroix (FRA)	St. Michel–Preference Home–Auber93	+ 56"
7	Damien Touzé (FRA)	Cofidis	+ 1' 01"
8	Andrea Mifsud (MLT)	Nice Métropole Côte d'Azur	+ 1' 01"
9	Pierre Latour (FRA)	Team TotalEnergies	+ 1' 01"
10	Thibault Guernalec (FRA)	Arkéa–B&B Hotels	+ 1' 08"

General classification after Stage 4
Rank	Rider	Team	Time
1	Kévin Vauquelin (FRA)	Arkéa–B&B Hotels	13h 05' 33"
2	Nicolas Breuillard (FRA)	St. Michel–Preference Home–Auber93	+ 51"
3	Kevin Geniets (LUX)	Groupama–FDJ	+ 57"
4	Dylan Teuns (BEL)	Cofidis	+ 1' 01"
5	Thomas Champion (FRA)	St. Michel–Preference Home–Auber93	+ 1' 10"
6	Pierre Latour (FRA)	Team TotalEnergies	+ 1' 11"
7	Damien Touzé (FRA)	Cofidis	+ 1' 19"
8	Thibault Guernalec (FRA)	Arkéa–B&B Hotels	+ 1' 31"
9	Vincent Van Hemelen (BEL)	Team Flanders–Baloise	+ 1' 51"
10	Théo Delacroix (FRA)	St. Michel–Preference Home–Auber93	+ 1' 52"

=== Stage 5 ===
9 February 2025 – Alès to Alès, 10.645 km (6.614 mi), (ITT)

Stage 5 Result
Rank	Rider	Team	Time
1	Kévin Vauquelin (FRA)	Arkéa–B&B Hotels	15' 07"
2	Rémi Cavagna (FRA)	Groupama–FDJ	+ 19"
3	Dylan Teuns (BEL)	Cofidis	+ 21"
4	Thibault Guernalec (FRA)	Arkéa–B&B Hotels	+ 24"
5	Maxime Decomble (FRA)	Groupama–FDJ	+ 25"
6	Vincent Van Hemelen (BEL)	Team Flanders–Baloise	+ 29"
7	Pierre Latour (FRA)	Team TotalEnergies	+ 35"
8	Kevin Geniets (LUX)	Groupama–FDJ	+ 38"
9	Damien Touzé (FRA)	Cofidis	+ 43"
10	Oliver Knight (GBR)	Cofidis	+ 45"

General classification after Stage 5
Rank	Rider	Team	Time
1	Kévin Vauquelin (FRA)	Arkéa–B&B Hotels	13h 20' 40"
2	Dylan Teuns (BEL)	Cofidis	+ 1' 22"
3	Kevin Geniets (LUX)	Groupama–FDJ	+ 1' 35"
4	Pierre Latour (FRA)	Team TotalEnergies	+ 1' 46"
5	Thibault Guernalec (FRA)	Arkéa–B&B Hotels	+ 1' 55"
6	Nicolas Breuillard (FRA)	St. Michel–Preference Home–Auber93	+ 1' 56"
7	Damien Touzé (FRA)	Cofidis	+ 2' 02"
8	Vincent Van Hemelen (BEL)	Team Flanders–Baloise	+ 2' 20"
9	Thomas Champion (FRA)	St. Michel–Preference Home–Auber93	+ 2' 23"
10	Fabien Doubey (FRA)	Team TotalEnergies	+ 2' 41"

== Classification leadership table ==
Classification leadership by stage
Stage	Winner	General classification (Note: The general classification leader's jersey is known as the coral jersey.)	Points classification	Mountains classification	Young rider classification	Team classification
1	Paul Magnier	Paul Magnier	Paul Magnier	Axandre Van Petegem	Paul Magnier	Red Bull–Bora–Hansgrohe
2	Søren Wærenskjold	Paul Magnier	Paul Magnier	Axandre Van Petegem	Paul Magnier	Red Bull–Bora–Hansgrohe
3	Arnaud De Lie	Arnaud De Lie	Arnaud Démare	Victor Vercouillie	Arnaud De Lie	Team TotalEnergies
4	Kévin Vauquelin	Kévin Vauquelin	Arnaud Démare	Victor Vercouillie	Clément Izquierdo	St. Michel–Preference Home–Auber93
5	Kévin Vauquelin	Kévin Vauquelin	Kévin Vauquelin	Victor Vercouillie	Clément Izquierdo	Groupama–FDJ
Final		Kévin Vauquelin	Kévin Vauquelin	Victor Vercouillie	Clément Izquierdo	Groupama–FDJ

== Classification standings ==
Legend
Denotes the winner of the general classification	Denotes the winner of the points classification
Denotes the winner of the mountains classification	Denotes the winner of the young rider classification

=== General classification ===
Final general classification (1–10)
Rank	Rider	Team	Time
1	Kévin Vauquelin (FRA)	Arkéa–B&B Hotels	13h 20' 40"
2	Dylan Teuns (BEL)	Cofidis	+ 1' 22"
3	Kevin Geniets (LUX)	Groupama–FDJ	+ 1' 35"
4	Pierre Latour (FRA)	Team TotalEnergies	+ 1' 46"
5	Thibault Guernalec (FRA)	Arkéa–B&B Hotels	+ 1' 55"
6	Nicolas Breuillard (FRA)	St. Michel–Preference Home–Auber93	+ 1' 56"
7	Damien Touzé (FRA)	Cofidis	+ 2' 02"
8	Vincent Van Hemelen (BEL)	Team Flanders–Baloise	+ 2' 20"
9	Thomas Champion (FRA)	St. Michel–Preference Home–Auber93	+ 2' 23"
10	Fabien Doubey (FRA)	Team TotalEnergies	+ 2' 41"

=== Points classification ===
Final points classification (1–10)
Rank	Rider	Team	Time
1	Kévin Vauquelin (FRA)	Arkéa–B&B Hotels	54
2	Arnaud Démare (FRA)	Arkéa–B&B Hotels	40
3	Arnaud De Lie (BEL)	Lotto	34
4	Dylan Teuns (BEL)	Cofidis	28
5	Paul Penhoët (FRA)	Groupama–FDJ	28
6	Kevin Geniets (LUX)	Groupama–FDJ	27
7	Rémi Cavagna (FRA)	Groupama–FDJ	25
8	Damien Touzé (FRA)	Cofidis	24
9	Théo Delacroix (FRA)	St. Michel–Preference Home–Auber93	23
10	Thibault Guernalec (FRA)	Arkéa–B&B Hotels	20

=== Mountains classification ===
Final mountains classification (1–10)
Rank	Rider	Team	Time
1	Victor Vercouillie (BEL)	Team Flanders–Baloise	36
2	Kévin Vauquelin (FRA)	Arkéa–B&B Hotels	20
3	Oliver Knight (GBR)	Cofidis	12
4	Théo Delacroix (FRA)	St. Michel–Preference Home–Auber93	10
5	Dylan Teuns (BEL)	Cofidis	10
6	Thomas Champion (FRA)	St. Michel–Preference Home–Auber93	8
7	Valentin Retailleau (FRA)	Team TotalEnergies	6
8	Nicolas Breuillard (FRA)	St. Michel–Preference Home–Auber93	6
9	Kevin Geniets (LUX)	Groupama–FDJ	4
10	Pierre Latour (FRA)	Team TotalEnergies	4

=== Young rider classification ===
Final young rider classification (1–10)
Rank	Rider	Team	Time
1	Clément Izquierdo (FRA)	Cofidis	13h 23' 29"
2	Maxime Decomble (FRA)	Groupama–FDJ	+ 1' 45"
3	Arnaud De Lie (BEL)	Lotto	+ 2' 10"
4	Sam Maisonobe (FRA)	Cofidis	+ 2' 21"
5	Dylan Vandenstorme (BEL)	Team Flanders–Baloise	+ 3' 34"
6	Pierre Thierry (FRA)	Arkéa–B&B Hotels	+ 5' 39"
7	Ronan Augé (FRA)	CIC–U–Nantes	+ 9' 49"
8	Baptiste Gillet (FRA)	Arkéa–B&B Hotels	+ 10' 45"
9	Corentin Devroute (FRA)	CIC–U–Nantes	+ 12' 59"
10	Victor Vercouillie (BEL)	Team Flanders–Baloise	+ 13' 27"

=== Teams classification ===
Final team classification (1–9)
Rank	Team	Time
1	(France) Groupama–FDJ	40h 08' 01"
2	(France) Cofidis	+ 11"
3	(France) St. Michel–Preference Home–Auber93	+ 23"
4	(France) Team TotalEnergies	+ 1' 50"
5	(France) Arkéa–B&B Hotels	+ 1' 54"
6	(France) Van Rysel–Roubaix	+ 7' 22"
7	(Belgium) Team Flanders–Baloise	+ 8' 01"
8	(France) Nice Métropole Côte d'Azur	+ 16' 47"
9	(France) CIC–U–Nantes	+ 18' 47"
