= 2025 Boucles de la Mayenne =

French cycling race

2025 UCI ProSeries

Race details
- Dates: 29 May – 1 June 2025
- Stages: 3 + Prologue
- Distance: 545.5 km (339.0 mi)
- Winning time: 12h 41' 56"

Results
| Jersey awarded to the overall winner | Winner | Aaron Gate (NZL) | (XDS Astana Team) |
| | Second | Pierre Latour (FRA) | (Team TotalEnergies) |
| | Third | Thibaud Gruel (FRA) | (Groupama–FDJ) |
| Jersey awarded to the points classification winner | Points | Pierre Latour (FRA) | (Team TotalEnergies) |
| Jersey awarded to the mountains classification winner | Mountains | Lenaic Langella (FRA) | (CIC–U–Nantes) |
| Jersey awarded to the youth classification winner | Youth | Thibaud Gruel (FRA) | (Groupama–FDJ) |
| | Team | (United States) EF Education–EasyPost | |

The 2025 Boucles de la Mayenne (transl. Loops of the Mayenne) is a road cycling stage race that is taking place between 29 May and 1 June 2025 in the Mayenne department in northwestern France. The race is rated as a category 2.Pro event on the 2025 UCI ProSeries calendar, and is the 50th edition of the Boucles de la Mayenne.

== Teams ==
Nine UCI WorldTeams, nine UCI ProTeams and four UCI Continental teams made up the 22 teams that participated in the race.

UCI WorldTeams

- Arkéa–B&B Hotels
- Cofidis
- Decathlon–AG2R La Mondiale
- EF Education–EasyPost
- Groupama–FDJ
- Intermarché–Wanty
- Movistar Team
- Team Jayco–AlUla
- XDS Astana Team

UCI ProTeams

- Burgos Burpellet BH
- Caja Rural–Seguros RGA
- Lotto
- Q36.5 Pro Cycling Team
- Team Solution Tech–Vini Fantini
- Team TotalEnergies
- Tudor Pro Cycling Team
- Unibet Tietema Rockets
- Wagner Bazin WB

UCI Continental Teams

- CIC–U–Nantes
- Nice Métropole Côte d'Azur
- St. Michel–Preference Home–Auber93
- Van Rysel–Roubaix

== Route ==
Stage characteristics and winners
| Stage | Date | Course | Distance | Type | Stage winner |
|---|---|---|---|---|---|
| P | 29 May | Laval (Espace Mayenne) | 5.4 km (3.4 mi) | Individual time trial | Thibaud Gruel (FRA) |
| 1 | 30 May | Saint-Berthevin to Juvigné | 166 km (103 mi) | Hilly stage | Pierre Latour (FRA) |
| 2 | 31 May | Sainte-Suzanne to Bais | 210.2 km (130.6 mi) | Hilly stage | Aaron Gate (NZL) |
| 3 | 1 June | Javron-les-Chapelles to Laval | 163.9 km (101.8 mi) | Flat stage | Marius Mayrhofer (GER) |
| Total | | | 545.5 km (339.0 mi) | | |

== Stages ==
=== Prologue ===
29 May 2025 – Laval (Espace Mayenne), 5.4 km (3.4 mi)

Prologue Result
| Rank | Rider | Team | Time |
|---|---|---|---|
| 1 | Thibaud Gruel (FRA) | Groupama–FDJ | 6' 46" |
| 2 | Benoît Cosnefroy (FRA) | Decathlon–AG2R La Mondiale | + 3" |
| 3 | Rory Townsend (IRL) | Q36.5 Pro Cycling Team | + 6" |
| 4 | Arthur Kluckers (LUX) | Tudor Pro Cycling Team | + 6" |
| 5 | Marijn van den Berg (NED) | EF Education–EasyPost | + 7" |
| 6 | Noa Isidore (FRA) | Decathlon–AG2R La Mondiale | + 7" |
| 7 | Paul Lapeira (FRA) | Decathlon–AG2R La Mondiale | + 7" |
| 8 | Amaury Capiot (BEL) | Arkéa–B&B Hotels | + 8" |
| 9 | Jordan Labrosse (FRA) | Decathlon–AG2R La Mondiale | + 9" |
| 10 | Clément Russo (FRA) | Groupama–FDJ | + 9" |

General classification after Prologue
| Rank | Rider | Team | Time |
|---|---|---|---|
| 1 | Thibaud Gruel (FRA) | Groupama–FDJ | 6' 46" |
| 2 | Benoît Cosnefroy (FRA) | Decathlon–AG2R La Mondiale | + 3" |
| 3 | Rory Townsend (IRL) | Q36.5 Pro Cycling Team | + 6" |
| 4 | Arthur Kluckers (LUX) | Tudor Pro Cycling Team | + 6" |
| 5 | Marijn van den Berg (NED) | EF Education–EasyPost | + 7" |
| 6 | Noa Isidore (FRA) | Decathlon–AG2R La Mondiale | + 7" |
| 7 | Paul Lapeira (FRA) | Decathlon–AG2R La Mondiale | + 7" |
| 8 | Amaury Capiot (BEL) | Arkéa–B&B Hotels | + 8" |
| 9 | Jordan Labrosse (FRA) | Decathlon–AG2R La Mondiale | + 9" |
| 10 | Clément Russo (FRA) | Groupama–FDJ | + 9" |

=== Stage 1 ===
30 May 2025 – Saint-Berthevin to Juvigné, 166 km (103 mi)

Stage 1 Result
| Rank | Rider | Team | Time |
|---|---|---|---|
| 1 | Pierre Latour (FRA) | Team TotalEnergies | 3h 54' 03" |
| 2 | Biniam Girmay (ERI) | Intermarché–Wanty | + 3" |
| 3 | Paul Penhoët (FRA) | Groupama–FDJ | + 3" |
| 4 | Jelte Krijnsen (NED) | Team Jayco–AlUla | + 3" |
| 5 | Giacomo Nizzolo (ITA) | Q36.5 Pro Cycling Team | + 3" |
| 6 | Valentin Retailleau (FRA) | Team TotalEnergies | + 3" |
| 7 | Carlos Canal (ESP) | Movistar Team | + 3" |
| 8 | Lander Loockx (BEL) | Unibet Tietema Rockets | + 3" |
| 9 | Robert Donaldson (GBR) | Team Jayco–AlUla | + 3" |
| 10 | Thibaud Gruel (FRA) | Groupama–FDJ | + 3" |

General classification after stage 1
| Rank | Rider | Team | Time |
|---|---|---|---|
| 1 | Thibaud Gruel (FRA) | Groupama–FDJ | 4h 00' 52" |
| 2 | Benoît Cosnefroy (FRA) | Decathlon–AG2R La Mondiale | + 3" |
| 3 | Rory Townsend (IRL) | Q36.5 Pro Cycling Team | + 6" |
| 4 | Paul Lapeira (FRA) | Decathlon–AG2R La Mondiale | + 6" |
| 5 | Arthur Kluckers (LUX) | Tudor Pro Cycling Team | + 6" |
| 6 | Marijn van den Berg (NED) | EF Education–EasyPost | + 7" |
| 7 | Noa Isidore (FRA) | Decathlon–AG2R La Mondiale | + 7" |
| 8 | Amaury Capiot (BEL) | Arkéa–B&B Hotels | + 8" |
| 9 | Clément Izquierdo (FRA) | Cofidis | + 8" |
| 10 | Jordan Labrosse (FRA) | Decathlon–AG2R La Mondiale | + 9" |

=== Stage 2 ===
31 May 2025 – Sainte-Suzanne to Bais, 210.2 km (130.6 mi)

Stage 2 Result
| Rank | Rider | Team | Time |
|---|---|---|---|
| 1 | Aaron Gate (NZL) | XDS Astana Team | 5h 07' 37" |
| 2 | Pierre Latour (FRA) | Team TotalEnergies | + 0" |
| 3 | Milan Menten (BEL) | Lotto | + 5" |
| 4 | Amaury Capiot (BEL) | Arkéa–B&B Hotels | + 5" |
| 5 | Rory Townsend (IRL) | Q36.5 Pro Cycling Team | + 5" |
| 6 | Benjamin Thomas (FRA) | Cofidis | + 5" |
| 7 | Lukáš Kubiš (SVK) | Unibet Tietema Rockets | + 5" |
| 8 | Marijn van den Berg (NED) | EF Education–EasyPost | + 5" |
| 9 | Clément Izquierdo (FRA) | Cofidis | + 5" |
| 10 | Biniam Girmay (ERI) | Intermarché–Wanty | + 5" |

General classification after stage 2
| Rank | Rider | Team | Time |
|---|---|---|---|
| 1 | Aaron Gate (NZL) | XDS Astana Team | 9h 08' 31" |
| 2 | Pierre Latour (FRA) | Team TotalEnergies | + 0" |
| 3 | Thibaud Gruel (FRA) | Groupama–FDJ | + 2" |
| 4 | Paul Lapeira (FRA) | Decathlon–AG2R La Mondiale | + 4" |
| 5 | Benoît Cosnefroy (FRA) | Decathlon–AG2R La Mondiale | + 6" |
| 6 | Rory Townsend (IRL) | Q36.5 Pro Cycling Team | + 9" |
| 7 | Marijn van den Berg (NED) | EF Education–EasyPost | + 10" |
| 8 | Amaury Capiot (BEL) | Arkéa–B&B Hotels | + 11" |
| 9 | Clément Izquierdo (FRA) | Cofidis | + 11" |
| 10 | Anthon Charmig (DEN) | XDS Astana Team | + 12" |

=== Stage 3 ===
1 June 2025 – Javron-les-Chapelles to Laval, 163.9 km (101.8 mi)

Stage 3 Result
| Rank | Rider | Team | Time |
|---|---|---|---|
| 1 | Marius Mayrhofer (GER) | Tudor Pro Cycling Team | 3h 32' 54" |
| 2 | Biniam Girmay (ERI) | Intermarché–Wanty | + 32" |
| 3 | Bryan Coquard (FRA) | Cofidis | + 32" |
| 4 | Paul Lapeira (FRA) | Decathlon–AG2R La Mondiale | + 32" |
| 5 | Paul Penhoët (FRA) | Groupama–FDJ | + 32" |
| 6 | Giacomo Nizzolo (ITA) | Q36.5 Pro Cycling Team | + 32" |
| 7 | Marijn van den Berg (NED) | EF Education–EasyPost | + 32" |
| 8 | Milan Menten (BEL) | Lotto | + 32" |
| 9 | Rory Townsend (IRL) | Q36.5 Pro Cycling Team | + 32" |
| 10 | Benjamin Thomas (FRA) | Cofidis | + 32" |

General classification after stage 3
| Rank | Rider | Team | Time |
|---|---|---|---|
| 1 | Aaron Gate (NZL) | XDS Astana Team | 12h 41' 56" |
| 2 | Pierre Latour (FRA) | Team TotalEnergies | + 1" |
| 3 | Thibaud Gruel (FRA) | Groupama–FDJ | + 3" |
| 4 | Paul Lapeira (FRA) | Decathlon–AG2R La Mondiale | + 5" |
| 5 | Benoît Cosnefroy (FRA) | Decathlon–AG2R La Mondiale | + 7" |
| 6 | Rory Townsend (IRL) | Q36.5 Pro Cycling Team | + 10" |
| 7 | Amaury Capiot (BEL) | Arkéa–B&B Hotels | + 10" |
| 8 | Marijn van den Berg (NED) | EF Education–EasyPost | + 11" |
| 9 | Clément Izquierdo (FRA) | Cofidis | + 12" |
| 10 | Anthon Charmig (DEN) | XDS Astana Team | + 13" |

== Classification leadership table ==
Classification leadership by stage
| Stage | Winner | General classification | Points classification | Mountains classification | Young rider classification | Team classification |
|---|---|---|---|---|---|---|
| P | Thibaud Gruel | Thibaud Gruel | Thibaud Gruel | not awarded | Thibaud Gruel | Decathlon–AG2R La Mondiale |
| 1 | Pierre Latour | Thibaud Gruel | Thibaud Gruel | Lenaic Langella | Thibaud Gruel | Decathlon–AG2R La Mondiale |
| 2 | Aaron Gate | Aaron Gate | Pierre Latour | Lenaic Langella | Thibaud Gruel | EF Education–EasyPost |
| 3 | Marius Mayrhofer | Aaron Gate | Pierre Latour | Lenaic Langella | Thibaud Gruel | EF Education–EasyPost |
| Final | | Aaron Gate | Pierre Latour | Lenaic Langella | Thibaud Gruel | EF Education–EasyPost |

== Classification standings ==
Legend
| Denotes the winner of the general classification | Denotes the winner of the mountains classification |
| Denotes the winner of the points classification | Denotes the winner of the young rider classification |

=== General classification ===
Final general classification (1–10)
| Rank | Rider | Team | Time |
|---|---|---|---|
| 1 | Aaron Gate (NZL) | XDS Astana Team | 12h 41' 56" |
| 2 | Pierre Latour (FRA) | Team TotalEnergies | + 1" |
| 3 | Thibaud Gruel (FRA) | Groupama–FDJ | + 3" |
| 4 | Paul Lapeira (FRA) | Decathlon–AG2R La Mondiale | + 5" |
| 5 | Benoît Cosnefroy (FRA) | Decathlon–AG2R La Mondiale | + 7" |
| 6 | Rory Townsend (IRL) | Q36.5 Pro Cycling Team | + 10" |
| 7 | Amaury Capiot (BEL) | Arkéa–B&B Hotels | + 10" |
| 8 | Marijn van den Berg (NED) | EF Education–EasyPost | + 11" |
| 9 | Clément Izquierdo (FRA) | Cofidis | + 12" |
| 10 | Anthon Charmig (DEN) | XDS Astana Team | + 13" |

=== Points classification ===
Final points classification (1–10)
| Rank | Rider | Team | Points |
|---|---|---|---|
| 1 | Pierre Latour (FRA) | Team TotalEnergies | 57 |
| 2 | Biniam Girmay (ERI) | Intermarché–Wanty | 46 |
| 3 | Marius Mayrhofer (GER) | Tudor Pro Cycling Team | 35 |
| 4 | Paul Lapeira (FRA) | Decathlon–AG2R La Mondiale | 35 |
| 5 | Rory Townsend (IRL) | Q36.5 Pro Cycling Team | 35 |
| 6 | Aaron Gate (NZL) | XDS Astana Team | 31 |
| 7 | Thibaud Gruel (FRA) | Groupama–FDJ | 30 |
| 8 | Marijn van den Berg (NED) | EF Education–EasyPost | 30 |
| 9 | Paul Penhoët (FRA) | Groupama–FDJ | 30 |
| 10 | Milan Menten (BEL) | Lotto | 28 |

=== Mountains classification ===
Final mountains classification (1–10)
| Rank | Rider | Team | Points |
|---|---|---|---|
| 1 | Lenaic Langella (FRA) | CIC–U–Nantes | 64 |
| 2 | Alessandro De Marchi (ITA) | EF Education–EasyPost | 24 |
| 3 | Célestin Guillon (FRA) | Van Rysel–Roubaix | 20 |
| 4 | Baptiste Veistroffer (FRA) | Lotto | 17 |
| 5 | Andreas Stokbro (DEN) | Unibet Tietema Rockets | 15 |
| 6 | Leander Van Hautegem (BEL) | Wagner Bazin WB | 11 |
| 7 | Johan Meens (BEL) | Wagner Bazin WB | 10 |
| 8 | Florian Sénéchal (FRA) | Arkéa–B&B Hotels | 10 |
| 9 | Paul Lapeira (FRA) | Decathlon–AG2R La Mondiale | 8 |
| 10 | Clément Izquierdo (FRA) | Cofidis | 8 |

=== Young rider classification ===
Final young rider classification (1–10)
| Rank | Rider | Team | Time |
|---|---|---|---|
| 1 | Thibaud Gruel (FRA) | Groupama–FDJ | 12h 41' 59" |
| 2 | Clément Izquierdo (FRA) | Cofidis | + 9" |
| 3 | Logan Currie (NZL) | Lotto | + 19" |
| 4 | Carlos Canal (ESP) | Movistar Team | + 21" |
| 5 | Louis Rouland (FRA) | Arkéa–B&B Hotels | + 24" |
| 6 | Lucas Beneteau (FRA) | St. Michel–Preference Home–Auber93 | + 35" |
| 7 | Alessandro Romele (ITA) | XDS Astana Team | + 1' 02" |
| 8 | Michel Hessmann (GER) | Movistar Team | + 1' 05" |
| 9 | Maximilien Juillard (FRA) | Van Rysel–Roubaix | + 2' 05" |
| 10 | Victor Papon (FRA) | Wagner Bazin WB | + 5' 24" |

=== Team classification ===
Final team classification (1–10)
| Rank | Team | Time |
|---|---|---|
| 1 | (United States) EF Education–EasyPost | 38h 06' 31" |
| 2 | (France) Cofidis | + 7" |
| 3 | (Kazakhstan) XDS Astana Team | + 8" |
| 4 | (France) Arkéa–B&B Hotels | + 11" |
| 5 | (Spain) Movistar Team | + 23" |
| 6 | (France) Unibet Tietema Rockets | + 26" |
| 7 | (France) Team TotalEnergies | + 29" |
| 8 | (Spain) Caja Rural–Seguros RGA | + 44" |
| 9 | (Belgium) Wagner Bazin WB | + 1' 19" |
| 10 | (Belgium) Lotto | + 5' 56" |
