= 2025 Cofidis (men's team) season =

Cofidis
- 2025 season
- UCI code: COF
- Status: UCI WorldTeam
- Manager: Cédric Vasseur (FRA)
- Based: France
- Bicycles: Look
- Groupset: Campagnolo

Season victories
- One-day races: 3
- Stage race stages: 6
- Most wins: (Belgium) Milan Fretin (3)

The 2025 season for the Cofidis team is the team's 29th season in existence, and the 6th consecutive year as a UCI WorldTeam.

== Team roster ==
All ages are as of 1 January 2025, the first day of the 2025 season.

As of 8 January 2025.

Rider	Date of birth
Piet Allegaert (BEL)	20 January 1995 (aged 29)
Stanisław Aniołkowski (POL)	20 January 1997 (aged 27)
Alex Aranburu (ESP)	19 September 1995 (aged 29)
Emanuel Buchmann (GER)	18 November 1992 (aged 32)
Simon Carr (GBR)	29 August 1998 (aged 26)
Bryan Coquard (FRA)	25 April 1992 (aged 32)
Aimé De Gendt (BEL)	17 June 1994 (aged 30)
Nicolas Debeaumarché (FRA)	24 February 1998 (aged 26)
Valentin Ferron (FRA)	8 February 1998 (aged 26)
Eddy Finé (FRA)	20 November 1997 (aged 27)
Milan Fretin (BEL)	19 March 2001 (aged 23)
Jesús Herrada (ESP)	26 July 1990 (aged 34)
Ion Izagirre (ESP)	4 February 1989 (aged 35)
Clément Izquierdo (FRA)	16 February 2002 (aged 22)
Oliver Knight (GBR)	25 January 2001 (aged 23)

Rider	Date of birth
Jonathan Lastra (ESP)	3 June 1993 (aged 31)
Jan Maas (NED)	19 February 1996 (aged 28)
Nolann Mahoudo (FRA)	17 November 2002 (aged 22)
Sam Maisonobe (FRA)	8 September 2003 (aged 21)
Sylvain Moniquet (BEL)	14 January 1998 (aged 26)
Stefano Oldani (ITA)	10 January 1998 (aged 26)
Paul Ourselin (FRA)	13 April 1994 (aged 30)
Anthony Perez (FRA)	22 April 1991 (aged 33)
Alexis Renard (FRA)	1 June 1999 (aged 25)
Ludovic Robeet (BEL)	22 May 1994 (aged 30)
Sergio Samitier (ESP)	31 August 1995 (aged 29)
Dylan Teuns (BEL)	1 March 1992 (aged 32)
Benjamin Thomas (FRA)	12 September 1995 (aged 29)
Hugo Toumire (FRA)	5 October 2001 (aged 23)
Damien Touzé (FRA)	7 July 1996 (aged 28)

== Season victories ==
Date	Race	Competition	Rider	Country	Location	Ref.
24 January	Tour Down Under, stage 4	UCI World Tour	Bryan Coquard (FRA)	Australia	Victor Harbor	
2 February	Grand Prix La Marseillaise	UCI Europe Tour	Valentin Ferron (FRA)	France	Marseille	
16 February	Clásica de Almería	UCI ProSeries	Milan Fretin (BEL)	Spain	Roquetas de Mar	
22 February	Volta ao Algarve, stage 4	UCI ProSeries	Milan Fretin (BEL)	Portugal	Faro	
9 April	Tour of the Basque Country, stage 3	UCI World Tour	Alex Aranburu (ESP)	Spain	Beasain	
16 April	Ronde van Limburg	UCI Europe Tour	Milan Fretin (BEL)	Belgium	Tongeren	
27 July	Tour de Wallonie, stage 2	UCI ProSeries	Oliver Knight (GBR)	Belgium	Sambreville	
30 July	Tour de Wallonie, stage 5	UCI ProSeries	Clément Izquierdo (FRA)	Belgium	Bertrix	
20 August	Tour du Limousin, stage 2	UCI Europe Tour	Sylvain Moniquet (BEL)	France	Grèzes	
