= 2025 Red Bull–Bora–Hansgrohe season =

Red Bull–Bora–Hansgrohe
- 2025 season
- UCI code: BOH / RBH
- Status: UCI WorldTeam
- Manager: Ralph Denk (GER)
- Based: Germany
- Bicycles: Specialized
- Groupset: SRAM

Season victories
- One-day races: 1
- Stage race overall: 1
- Stage race stages: 14
- National Championships: 4
- Most wins: (Slovenia) Primož Roglič (Australia) Sam Welsford (Belgium) Jordi Meeus (Netherlands) Danny van Poppel (3 wins each)

The 2025 season for the Red Bull–Bora–Hansgrohe team is the team's 16th season in existence, and its 9th season as a UCI WorldTeam.

== Team roster ==
As of 1 January 2025.

Rider	Date of birth
Roger Adrià (ESP)	18 May 1998 (aged 26)
Giovanni Aleotti (ITA)	25 May 1999 (aged 25)
Nico Denz (GER)	15 February 1994 (aged 30)
Finn Fisher-Black (NZL)	21 December 2001 (aged 23)
Alexander Hajek (AUT)	19 July 2003 (aged 21)
Emil Herzog (GER)	6 October 2004 (aged 20)
Jai Hindley (AUS)	5 May 1996 (aged 28)
Jonas Koch (GER)	25 June 1993 (aged 31)
Oier Lazkano (ESP)	7 November 1999 (aged 25)
Florian Lipowitz (GER)	21 September 2000 (aged 24)
Filip Maciejuk (POL)	3 September 1999 (aged 25)
Daniel Martínez (COL)	25 April 1996 (aged 28)
Jordi Meeus (BEL)	1 July 1998 (aged 26)
Gianni Moscon (ITA)	20 April 1994 (aged 30)
Ryan Mullen (IRL)	7 August 1994 (aged 30)

Rider	Date of birth
Anton Palzer (GER)	11 March 1993 (aged 31)
Giulio Pellizzari (ITA)	21 November 2003 (aged 21)
Laurence Pithie (NZL)	17 July 2002 (aged 22)
Primož Roglič (SLO)	29 October 1989 (aged 35)
Matteo Sobrero (ITA)	14 June 1997 (aged 27)
Jan Tratnik (SLO)	23 February 1990 (aged 34)
Mick van Dijke (NED)	15 March 2000 (aged 24)
Tim van Dijke (NED)	15 March 2000 (aged 24)
Maxim Van Gils (BEL)	25 November 1999 (aged 25)
Danny van Poppel (NED)	26 July 1993 (aged 31)
Aleksandr Vlasov (RUS)	23 April 1996 (aged 28)
Frederik Wandahl (DEN)	9 May 2001 (aged 23)
Sam Welsford (AUS)	19 January 1996 (aged 28)
Ben Zwiehoff (GER)	22 February 1994 (aged 30)

== Season victories ==
Date	Race	Competition	Rider	Country	Location	Ref.
21 January	Tour Down Under, stage 1	UCI World Tour	Sam Welsford (AUS)	Australia	Gumeracha	
22 January	Tour Down Under, stage 2	UCI World Tour	Sam Welsford (AUS)	Australia	Tanunda	
26 January	Tour Down Under, stage 6	UCI World Tour	Sam Welsford (AUS)	Australia	Adelaide	
19 February	Vuelta a Andalucía, stage 1	UCI ProSeries	Maxim Van Gils (BEL)	Spain	Cuevas de Nerja	
21 February	Volta ao Algarve, stage 3	UCI ProSeries	Jordi Meeus (BEL)	Portugal	Tavira	
27 March	Volta a Catalunya, stage 4	UCI World Tour	Primož Roglič (SLO)	Spain	Montserrat Mil·lenari	
30 March	Volta a Catalunya, stage 7	UCI World Tour	Primož Roglič (SLO)	Spain	Barcelona	
30 March	Volta a Catalunya, overall	UCI World Tour	Primož Roglič (SLO)	Spain		
14 May	Tour de Hongrie, stage 1	UCI ProSeries	Danny van Poppel (NED)	Hungary	Győr	
15 May	Tour de Hongrie, stage 2	UCI ProSeries	Danny van Poppel (NED)	Hungary	Siófok	
29 May	Giro d'Italia, stage 18	UCI World Tour	Nico Denz (GER)	Italy	Cesano Maderno	
31 May	Tour of Norway, stage 3	UCI ProSeries	Maxim Van Gils (BEL)	Norway	Heja	
20 June	Tour de Suisse, stage 6	UCI World Tour	Jordi Meeus (BEL)	Switzerland	Neuhausen am Rheinfall	
22 June	Copenhagen Sprint	UCI World Tour	Jordi Meeus (BEL)	Denmark	Copenhagen	
28 July	Tour de Wallonie, stage 3	UCI ProSeries	Davide Donati (ITA)	Belgium	Antoing	
5 August	Vuelta a Burgos, stage 1	UCI ProSeries	Roger Adrià (ESP)	Spain	Burgos	

== National, Continental, and World Champions ==
Date	Discipline	Jersey	Rider	Country	Location	Ref.
6 February	New Zealand National Time Trial Championships		Finn Fisher-Black (NZL)	New Zealand	Timaru	
26 June	Polish National Time Trial Championships		Filip Maciejuk (POL)	Poland	Szczyrzyc	
26 June	Irish National Time Trial Championships		Ryan Mullen (IRL)	Ireland	Kilbeggan	
28 June	Dutch National Road Race Championships		Danny van Poppel (NED)	Netherlands	Ede	
