= Anthon Charmig =

Danish cyclist (born 1998)

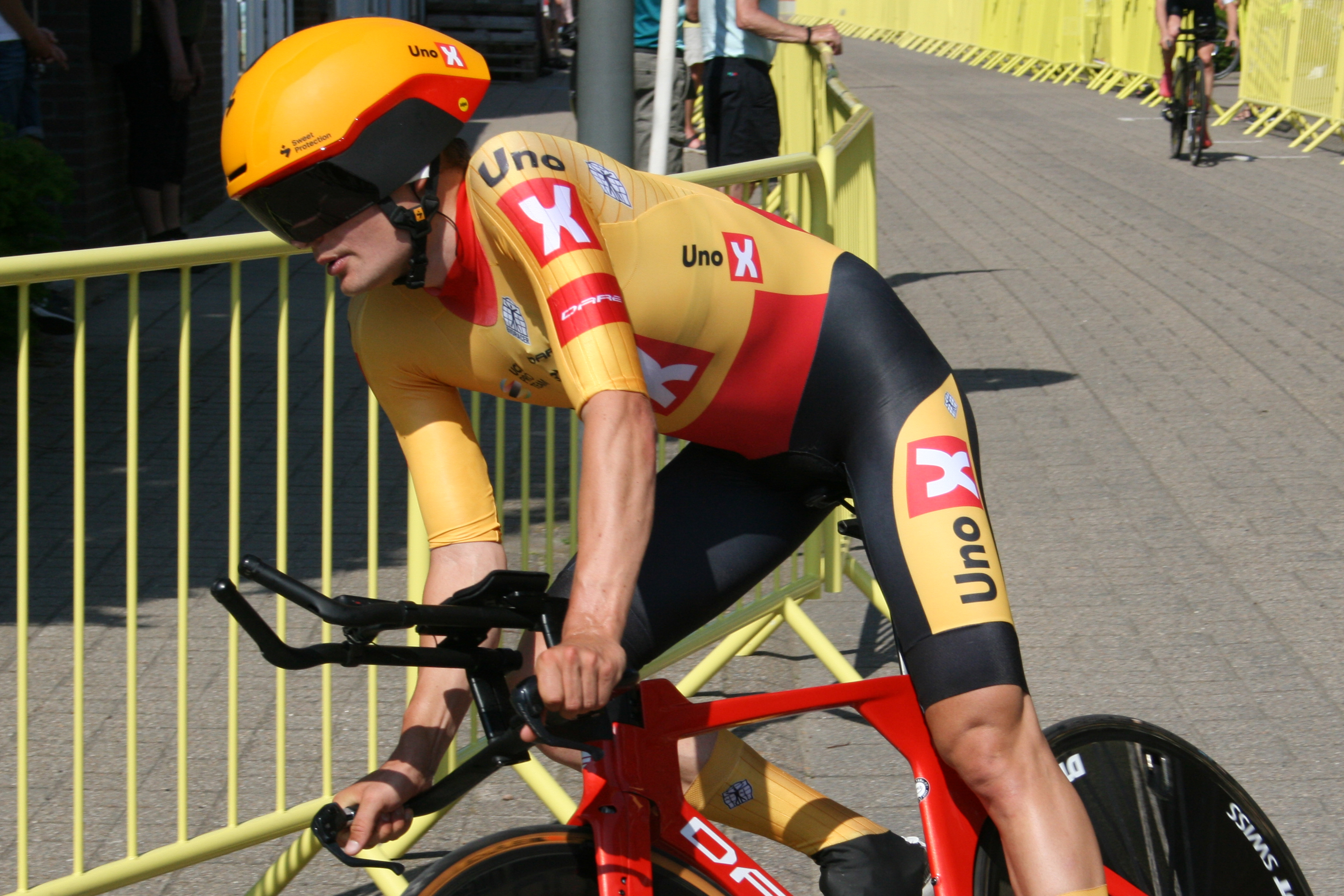
- Anthon Charmig in 2021

Personal information
- Nickname: Prins Charmig
- Born: 25 March 1998 (age 28) Aarhus, Denmark
- Height: 1.82 m (6 ft 0 in)
- Weight: 66 kg (146 lb)

Cycling career
- Sport: Cycling
- Current team: Uno-X Mobility
- Discipline: Road
- Role: Rider
- Rider type: Puncheur, all-rounder

Amateur teams
- 2007–2010: CK Aarhus
- 2011–2014: Odder CK
- 2015–2016: Team Kelberg–Roskilde Junior
- 2019: AURA Energi–CK Aarhus

Professional teams
- 2017: Team VéloCONCEPT
- 2020: Team ColoQuick
- 2021: Uno-X Dare Development Team
- 2021–2023: Uno-X Pro Cycling Team
- 2024–2025: Astana Qazaqstan Team
- 2026–: Uno-X Mobility
Medal record
Road cycling
Representing Denmark
European Road Championships
Silver medal – second place	2020 Plouay	Under-23 road race

Anthon Charmig (born 25 March 1998) is a Danish professional road racing cyclist who rides for UCI WorldTeam Uno-X Mobility.

Charmig won the Danish junior time trial title in 2015 and the Taiwan KOM Challenge in 2019. He finished second in the under-23 road race at the 2020 European Road Championships and won the mountains classification at the Tour of Norway. He won a stage of the Tour of Oman in 2022. He won the second stage of the Tour Auvergne-Rhône-Alpes in 2026 for his first victory at UCI World Tour level.

== Early life, amateur and continental career ==
Charmig comes from Malling, south of Aarhus. He began cycling at the age of nine. He rode first for Cykle Klubben Aarhus and then for Odder CK in Odder. In the under-17 category, he made a name for himself during the 2014 season by winning the GP Matoušek, considered a junior version of the Peace Race. He also finished second in the junior time trial at the Danish National Road Race Championships, whilst not yet seventeen years old.

In 2015, he became Danish time trial champion and national cyclo-cross runner-up in the junior category. At international level, he won the Trophée Centre Morbihan, part of the Junior Nations Cup calendar. He also finished second in Aubel-Thimister-La Gleize and the Trofeo Emilio Paganessi, and third in the Ster van Zuid-Limburg and the Tour du Pays de Vaud. In the autumn, he represented his country at the World Championships, held in Richmond. Again in his age group, he finished thirteenth in the road race.

Charmig joined the Team VéloCONCEPT continental team in 2017. His new manager, Bjarne Riis, praised his physical abilities, comparing him to Alberto Contador. However, he had a difficult start in the U23 ranks. At just nineteen, he decided to end his cycling career in order to study at Copenhagen Business School (CBS). However, he reversed his decision when he realised that the course was not right for him. Initially, he took up cycling again with friends, whilst training at a gym in Aarhus. He then made his return to competition in 2019. On the Danish circuit, he secured one victory, three podium finishes and six top-ten placings. He also claimed victory abroad at the Taiwan KOM Challenge.

In 2020, he joined Team ColoQuick. Due to the COVID-19 pandemic, he did not compete in any races until July. He nevertheless distinguished himself with the Danish national team by becoming European road runner-up in the U23 category. The Danish rider was narrowly beaten at the finish line by Norway's Jonas Iversby Hvideberg. Following this performance, he joined the Uno-X Pro continental reserve squad in 2021. Regularly competing alongside the professionals, he demonstrated his ability by finishing sixth in the Tour of Turkey and seventh in the Tour of Denmark. At the Tour of Norway, he won the mountains classification, thanks to a series of breakaways. He also finished second in the Alpes Isère Tour and fourth in the time trial at the U23 Giro d'Italia.

== Professional career ==
=== Uno-X Pro Cycling Team (2022–23) ===
In 2022, Charmig was officially promoted to the Uno-X Pro squad. He made his comeback at the Saudi Tour, where he finished third in a stage and seventh overall. Charmig took his first professional win on the third stage of the Tour of Oman on 12 February 2022. The stage ran 180 km (110 mi) from Sultan Qaboos University to Qurayyat and finished on a climb of 2.8 km (1.7 mi) at an average gradient of 6.5%. A six-man breakaway led by three minutes and the last of it was caught inside the final 10 km (6.2 mi). Jan Hirt attacked early on the climb. Charmig came past him and beat him to the line. Charmig took the red jersey from Mark Cavendish, who lost several minutes, and led Hirt by four seconds. He ultimately finished the race in fifth place overall, whilst also winning the white jersey for best young rider. On his return to Europe, he was part of a breakaway for 130 kilometres at the La Drôme Classic. In March, he fell ill during the Volta a Catalunya. Sidelined from competition for a month, he regained his form during the spring, finishing ninth in the Tour de Hongrie. He then came second in the Czech Tour and tenth in the Tour of Denmark.

During the summer of 2023, he finished fourth in the road race at the Danish National Championships. The following month, he lined up at the start of the Tour de France. His main role was to support the climbers Tobias Halland Johannessen and Torstein Træen. In his first Grand Tour, he broke away on two stages, though without achieving any notable results.

=== Astana Qazaqstan Team (2024–25) ===
After two seasons with Uno-X Pro, Charmig joined the Astana Qazaqstan Team in 2024. His year was disrupted by health issues and a crash, which prevented him from competing in a Grand Tour. He nevertheless finished fourth in the Tour de Kyushu and fifth in the Tour de Langkawi. In 2025, he finished sixth in the Clàssica Comunitat Valenciana 1969 and tenth in the Boucles de la Mayenne. At World Tour level, he achieved his best result at the Grand Prix Cycliste de Québec, finishing seventh.

=== Return to Uno-X Mobility (2026–present) ===
In 2026, he returned to the Uno-X Mobility, which he had left two years earlier. Competing initially in Oceania, he finished seventh in the Tour Down Under and eleventh in the Cadel Evans Great Ocean Road Race. In March, he came fifth in a stage of the Volta a Catalunya, following a sprint finish.

Charmig won the second stage of the Tour Auvergne-Rhône-Alpes on 8 June 2026. The stage ran 234.3 km (145.6 mi) from Saint-Martin-le-Vinoux to Le Puy-en-Velay and was the race's longest since 2003. A ten-man breakaway went clear on the opening climbs and led by 5 minutes 40 seconds at the summit of the Col de la Croix de Tour Aures. The group split on the Côte des Baraques, which summited about 30 km (19 mi) from the finish, and Charmig lost contact. He regained it with three others to leave seven riders at the front with 20 km (12 mi) to go. He attacked on the steeper second half of the Côte de Saint-Vidal about 12 km (7.5 mi) from the line and crossed the summit alone with twelve seconds in hand. He held the gap on the descent and won by 43 seconds from Henri-François Renard-Haquin, who outsprinted Vlad Van Mechelen for second. Alex Baudin kept the race lead as the main group finished about 3 minutes 10 seconds down. It was Charmig's first win at World Tour level and his first of any kind since Oman in 2022. He said afterwards that the second-to-last climb had been too long for him and that he had tried not to panic when the others went clear.

== Riding style ==
Emil Axelgaard of TV 2 described Charmig as a puncheur rather than a climber, and wrote that a lack of consistency had been the theme of his career. Axelgaard wrote that Charmig often began seasons strongly and then spent long periods well short of the leading riders, and that he had struggled to carry his form in smaller races over to the World Tour. Charmig has also ridden as a lead-out man, and set up Magnus Cort for a win at the Volta a Catalunya.

== Major results ==
2014
2nd Time trial, National Junior Road Championships
2015
National Junior Road Championships

1st Time trial
2nd Road race

1st Overall Trophée Centre Morbihan

1st Young rider classification

2nd Overall Aubel–Thimister–La Gleize
2nd Trofeo Emilio Paganessi
3rd Overall Tour du Pays de Vaud

1st Young rider classification

7th Trofeo comune di Vertova Memorial Pietro Merelli
2016
4th Trofeo Emilio Paganessi
2019
1st Taiwan KOM Challenge
2020
2nd Road race, UEC European Under-23 Road Championships
3rd Overall Randers Bike Week
2021
1st Mountains classification, Tour of Norway
2nd Overall Alpes Isère Tour
6th Overall Tour of Turkey
7th Overall Danmark Rundt
2022 (1 pro win)
2nd Overall Czech Cycling Tour
5th Overall Tour of Oman

1st Young rider classification
1st Stage 3

7th Overall Saudi Tour
9th Overall Tour de Hongrie
10th Overall Danmark Rundt
2023
4th Road race, National Road Championships
2024
4th Overall Tour de Kyushu
5th Overall Tour de Langkawi
2025
6th Clàssica Comunitat Valenciana 1969
7th Grand Prix Cycliste de Québec
10th Overall Boucles de la Mayenne
2026 (1)
1st Stage 2 Tour Auvergne-Rhône-Alpes
2nd Gran Piemonte
2nd Giro del Veneto
2nd Veneto Classic
3rd Road race, National Road Championships
3rd Grand Prix Cycliste de Québec
3rd GP Industria & Artigianato di Larciano
7th Overall Tour Down Under
Combativity award Stage 11 Tour de France

=== Grand Tour general classification results timeline ===
Grand Tour	2023	2024	2025	2026
Giro d'Italia	—	—	—	—
Tour de France	99	—	—	DNF
Vuelta a España	—	—	—	

Legend
—	Did not compete
DNF	Did not finish
IP	Race in Progress
