= 2026 Coppa Bernocchi =

- 2026 UCI ProSeries

Race details
- Dates: 5 October 2026
- Stages: 1
- Distance: 178.1 km (110.7 mi)
- Winning time: 3h 53' 28"

Results
	Winner	Noa Isidore (FRA)	(Decathlon CMA CGM)
	Second	Tommaso Dati (ITA)	(Team UKYO)
	Third	Orluis Aular (VEN)	(Movistar Team)

The 2026 Coppa Bernocchi (also known as the Coppa Bernocchi – GP Banco BPM for sponsorship reasons) was the 107th edition of the Coppa Bernocchi road cycling one day race, which was held in and around Legnano, Italy, on 5 October 2026.

== Teams ==
Sixteen UCI WorldTeams, eight UCI ProTeams, and one UCI Continental team made up the twenty-five teams that participated in the race.

UCI WorldTeams

- Alpecin–Premier Tech
- Decathlon CMA CGM
- EF Education–EasyPost
- Groupama–FDJ United
- Lotto–Intermarché
- Lidl–Trek
- Movistar Team
- Netcompany INEOS
- NSN Cycling Team
- Red Bull–Bora–Hansgrohe
- Soudal–Quick-Step
- Team Bahrain Victorious
- Team Jayco–AlUla
- UAE Team Emirates XRG
- Uno-X Mobility
- XDS Astana Team

UCI ProTeams

- Bardiani–CSF 7 Saber
- Caja Rural–Seguros RGA
- Cofidis
- MBH Bank CSB Telecom Fort
- Pinarello–Q36.5 Pro Cycling Team
- Team Polti VisitMalta
- Tudor Pro Cycling Team
- Solution Tech NIPPO Rali

UCI Continental Teams

- Team UKYO

== Results ==
Result
Rank	Rider	Team	Time
1	Noa Isidore (FRA)	Decathlon CMA CGM	3h 53' 28"
2	Tommaso Dati (ITA)	Team UKYO	+ 0"
3	Orluis Aular (VEN)	Movistar Team	+ 0"
4	Alessandro Romele (ITA)	XDS Astana Team	+ 0"
5	Dorian Godon (FRA)	Netcompany INEOS	+ 0"
6	Pepijn Reinderink (NED)	Soudal–Quick-Step	+ 0"
7	Davide Donati (ITA)	Red Bull–Bora–Hansgrohe	+ 0"
8	Andrea Vendrame (ITA)	Team Jayco–AlUla	+ 0"
9	Filippo Baroncini (ITA)	UAE Team Emirates XRG	+ 0"
10	Sakarias Koller Løland (NOR)	Uno-X Mobility	+ 0"
