= Marie-Cécile Morice =

French politician (1947–2024)

- Born: 9 July 1947
- Died: 9 February 2024 (aged 75)
- Known for: politician

Marie-Cécile Morice (9 July 1947 – 9 February 2024) was a French politician.

== Career ==
Morice had a long career in politics. She was the parliamentary assistant to the Member of Parliament François d'Aubert in 1989. Morice was mayor of Bais, a commune in Mayenne. She was elected in 2020. She was also a member of the Departmental Council of Mayenne and vice-president of the Departmental Council. In office she was responsible for a new health center, leisure area, fire station and a gendarmerie.

Morice died in hospital in February 2024. Her funeral was held on 14 February in Évron.

== Awards and honours ==
For her services she was awarded the Knight of the National Order of Merit.
