= Victor Vercouillie =

Belgian cyclist (born 2002)

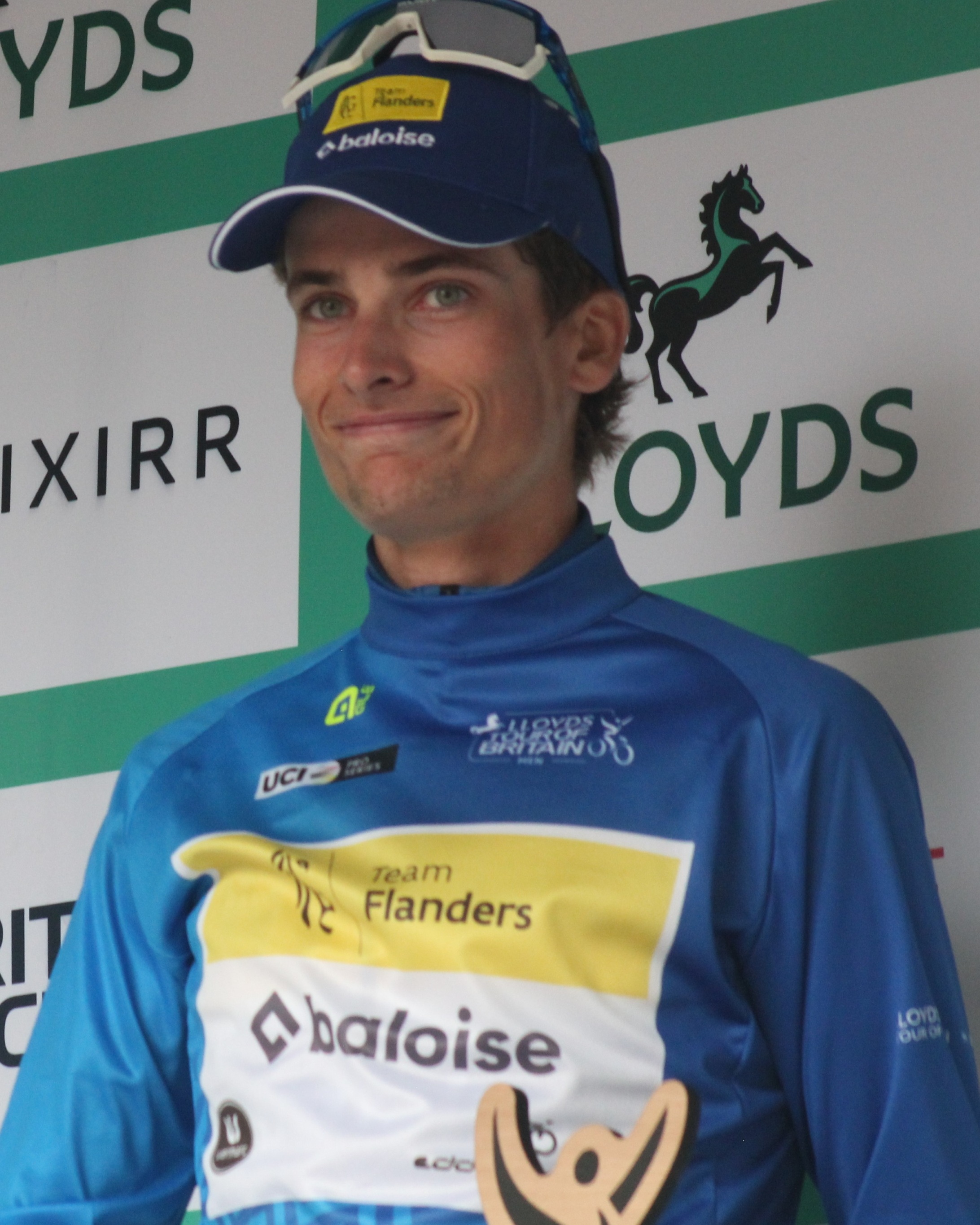
- Vercouillie in 2025

Personal information
- Born: 3 November 2002 (age 23) Kortrijk, Belgium
- Height: 1.82 m (6 ft 0 in)
- Weight: 66 kg (146 lb)

Cycling career
- Sport: Cycling
- Current team: Team Flanders–Baloise
- Discipline: Road
- Role: Rider
- Rider type: Time trialist

Amateur teams
- 2019–2020: Onder Ons Parike WZW
- 2021–2022: Dovy Keukens–FCC
- 2023: EFC–L&R–Van Mossel

Professional teams
- 2023: Bolton Equities Black Spoke (stagiaire)
- 2024–: Team Flanders–Baloise
Medal record
Men's road bicycle racing
Representing Belgium
European Championships
Bronze medal – third place	2024 Limburg	Mixed team relay

Victor Vercouillie (born 3 November 2002) is a Belgian cyclist, who currently rides for UCI ProTeam Team Flanders–Baloise.

== Major results ==
2023
1st Stage 2 H4A Beloften Weekend
2nd Memorial Igor Decraene
3rd Time trial, National Under-23 Road Championships
4th Overall Flanders Tomorrow Tour
2024
3rd Team relay, UEC European Road Championships
2025
1st Mountains classification, Tour of Britain
1st Mountains classification, Étoile de Bessèges
6th Grote Prijs Jean-Pierre Monseré
