= 2024 Astana Qazaqstan Team season =

Astana Qazaqstan Team
- 2024 season
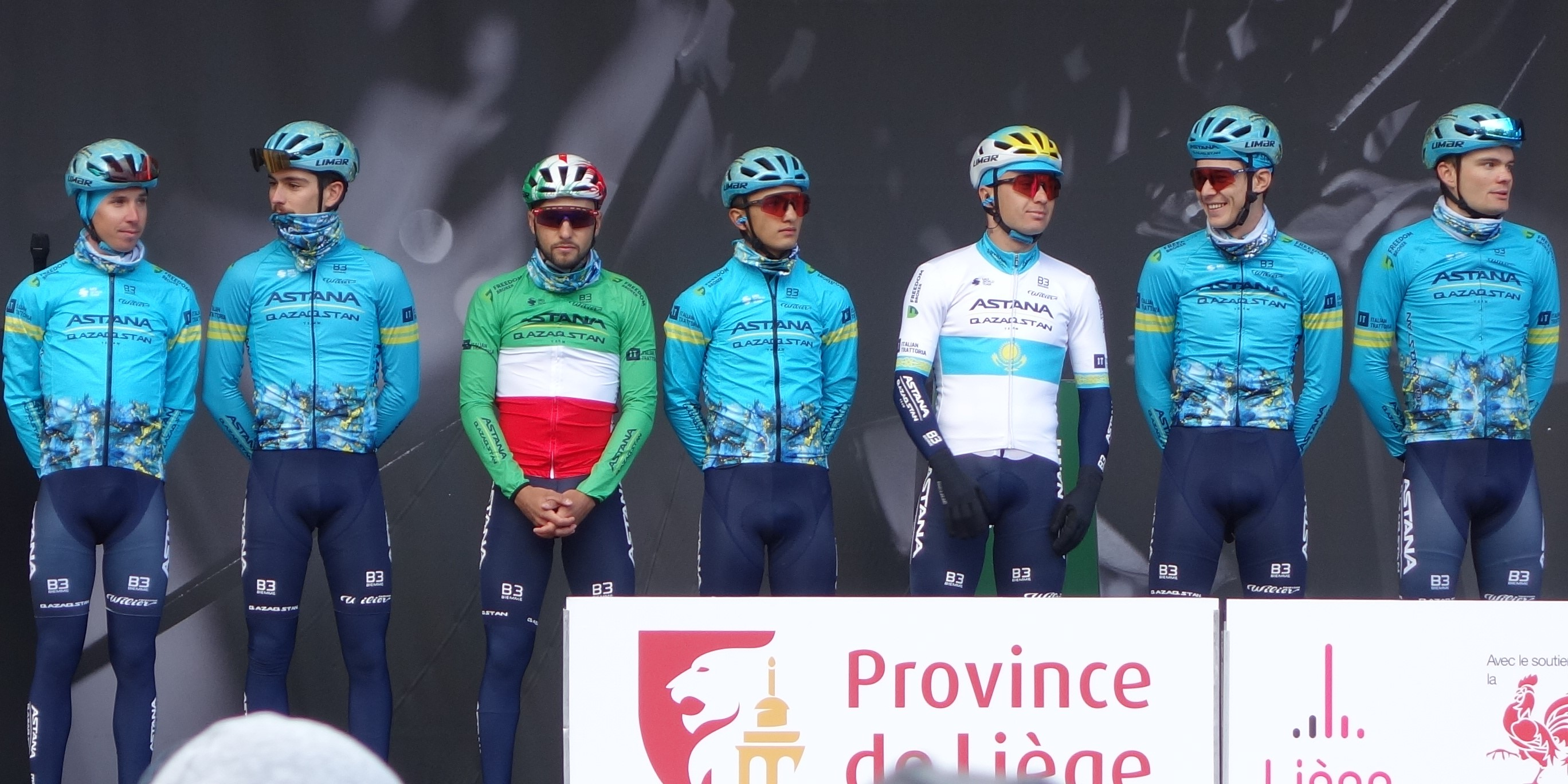
- UCI code: AST
- Status: UCI WorldTeam
- Manager: Alexander Vinokourov (KAZ)
- Based: Kazakhstan

Season victories
- Stage race overall: 1
- Stage race stages: 9
- National Championships: 2
- Most wins: (United Kingdom) Mark Cavendish (3 wins)

The 2024 season for the Astana Qazaqstan Team team is the team's 19th season in existence, all of which have been as a UCI WorldTeam.

== Team roster ==
As of 10 January 2024.

Rider	Date of birth
Davide Ballerini (ITA)	21 September 1994 (aged 29)
Samuele Battistella (ITA)	14 November 1998 (aged 25)
Cees Bol (NED)	27 July 1995 (aged 28)
Gleb Brussenskiy (KAZ)	18 April 2000 (aged 23)
Mark Cavendish (GBR)	21 May 1985 (aged 38)
Anthon Charmig (DEN)	25 March 1998 (aged 25)
Igor Chzhan (KAZ)	2 October 1999 (aged 24)
Yevgeniy Fedorov (KAZ)	16 February 2000 (aged 23)
Lorenzo Fortunato (ITA)	9 May 1996 (aged 27)
Gianmarco Garofoli (ITA)	6 October 2002 (aged 21)
Michele Gazzoli (ITA)	4 March 1999 (aged 24)
Yevgeniy Gidich (KAZ)	19 May 1996 (aged 27)
Dmitriy Gruzdev (KAZ)	13 March 1986 (aged 37)
Max Kanter (GER)	22 October 1997 (aged 26)
Anton Kuzmin (KAZ)	20 November 1996 (aged 27)

Rider	Date of birth
Harold Martín López (ECU)	3 December 2000 (aged 23)
Alexey Lutsenko (KAZ)	7 September 1992 (aged 31)
Daniil Marukhin (KAZ)	13 February 1999 (aged 24)
Michael Mørkøv (DEN)	30 April 1985 (aged 38)
Henok Mulubrhan (ERI)	11 November 1999 (aged 24)
Vadim Pronskiy (KAZ)	4 June 1998 (aged 25)
Christian Scaroni (ITA)	16 October 1997 (aged 26)
Ide Schelling (NED)	6 February 1998 (aged 25)
Rüdiger Selig (GER)	19 February 1989 (aged 34)
Gleb Syritsa (RUS)	14 April 2000 (aged 23)
Harold Tejada (COL)	27 April 1997 (aged 26)
Santiago Umba (COL)	20 November 2002 (aged 21)
Simone Velasco (ITA)	2 December 1995 (aged 28)
Nicolas Vinokurov (KAZ)	7 July 2002 (aged 21)

== Season victories ==
Date	Race	Competition	Rider	Country	Location	Ref.
7 February	Tour Colombia, stage 2	UCI America Tour	Harold Tejada (COL)	Colombia	Santa Rosa de Viterbo	
9 February	Tour Colombia, stage 4	UCI America Tour	Mark Cavendish (GBR)	Colombia	Zipaquirá	
11 April	Giro d'Abruzzo, stage 3	UCI Europe Tour	Alexey Lutsenko (KAZ)	Italy	Prati di Tivo	
12 April	Giro d'Abruzzo, overall	UCI Europe Tour	Alexey Lutsenko (KAZ)	Italy		
22 April	Tour of Turkey, stage 2	UCI ProSeries	Max Kanter (GER)	Turkey	Kaş	
9 May	Tour de Hongrie, stage 2	UCI ProSeries	Mark Cavendish (GBR)	Hungary	Kazincbarcika	
3 July	Tour de France, stage 5	UCI World Tour	Mark Cavendish (GBR)	France	Saint-Vulbas	
31 August	Tour of Hainan, stage 5	UCI ProSeries	Ivan Smirnov (RUS)	China	Sanya	
29 September	Tour de Langkawi, stage 1	UCI ProSeries	Gleb Syritsa (RUS)	Malaysia	Kuah	
14 October	Tour de Kyushu, stage 3	UCI Asia Tour	Ivan Smirnov (RUS)	Japan	Munakata	

== National, Continental, and World Champions ==
Date	Discipline	Jersey	Rider	Country	Location	Ref.
8 June	Asian Under-23 Continental Time Trial Championships		Nicolas Vinokurov (KAZ)	Kazakhstan	Almaty	
9 June	Asian Continental Time Trial Championships		Yevgeniy Fedorov (KAZ)	Kazakhstan	Almaty	
19 June	Kazakhstan National Time Trial Championships		Dmitriy Gruzdev (KAZ)	Kazakhstan	Taldykorgan	
23 June	Kazakhstan National Road Race Championships		Dmitriy Gruzdev (KAZ)	Kazakhstan	Taldykorgan	
13 October	African Continental Road Race Championships		Henok Mulubrhan (ERI)	KEN	Iten	
