= 2025 Tour de Wallonie =

2025 UCI ProSeries
- Event poster with previous winner Matteo Trentin

Race details
- Dates: 26–30 July 2025
- Stages: 5
- Distance: 847 km (526 mi)
- Winning time: 19h 33' 03"

Results
Jersey awarded to the overall winner	Winner	Corbin Strong (NZL)	(Israel–Premier Tech)
	Second	Mathias Vacek (CZE)	(Lidl–Trek)
	Third	Oliver Knight (GBR)	(Cofidis)
Jersey awarded to the points classification winner	Points	Corbin Strong (NZL)	(Israel–Premier Tech)
Jersey awarded to the mountains classification winner	Mountains	Henri-François Renard-Haquin (FRA)	(Wagner Bazin WB)
	Young rider	Mathias Vacek (CZE)	(Lidl–Trek)
Jersey awarded to the sprints classification winner	Sprints	Henri-François Renard-Haquin (FRA)	(Wagner Bazin WB)
	Team	(Spain) Movistar Team	

The 2025 Tour de Wallonie (known as the Ethias–Tour de Wallonie for sponsorship reasons) was a five-stage men's professional road cycling race mainly held in the Belgian region of Wallonia. It was a 2.Pro race as part of the 2025 UCI ProSeries calendar. It was the 52nd edition of the Tour de Wallonie.

== Teams ==
Eleven UCI WorldTeams, seven UCI ProTeams, and three UCI Continental teams make up the twenty-one teams that will participate in the race.

UCI WorldTeams

- Alpecin–Deceuninck
- Arkéa–B&B Hotels
- Cofidis
- Groupama–FDJ
- INEOS Grenadiers
- Intermarché–Wanty
- Lidl–Trek
- Movistar Team
- Red Bull–Bora–Hansgrohe
- Team Bahrain Victorious
- Team Jayco–AlUla

UCI ProTeams

- Israel–Premier Tech
- Lotto
- Team Flanders–Baloise
- Team TotalEnergies
- Uno-X Mobility
- VF Group–Bardiani–CSF–Faizanè
- Wagner Bazin WB

UCI Continental Teams

- Baloise Glowi Lions
- Pauwels Sauzen–Cibel Clementines
- Tarteletto–Isorex

== Route ==
Stage characteristics and winners
Stage	Date	Route	Distance	Type	Winner
1	26 July	Nassogne to Nassogne	182 km (113 mi)	Hilly stage	Corbin Strong (NZL)
2	27 July	Huy to Sambreville	153.1 km (95.1 mi)	Hilly stage	Oliver Knight (GBR)
3	28 July	Estinnes to Antoing	165.3 km (102.7 mi)	Flat stage	Davide Donati (ITA)
4	29 July	Welkenraedt to Seraing	163.3 km (101.5 mi)	Hilly stage	Mathias Vacek (CZE)
5	30 July	Bertrix to Bertrix	183.3 km (113.9 mi)	Hilly stage	Clément Izquierdo (FRA)
Total			847 km (526 mi)		

== Stages ==
=== Stage 1 ===
26 July 2025 — Nassogne to Nassogne, 182 km (113 mi)

Stage 1 Result
Rank	Rider	Team	Time
1	Corbin Strong (NZL)	Israel–Premier Tech	4h 14' 00"
2	Rasmus Tiller (NOR)	Uno-X Mobility	+ 0"
3	Anders Foldager (DEN)	Team Jayco–AlUla	+ 0"
4	Oliver Knight (GBR)	Cofidis	+ 0"
5	Sandy Dujardin (FRA)	Team TotalEnergies	+ 0"
6	Jelte Krijnsen (NED)	Team Jayco–AlUla	+ 0"
7	Tibor Del Grosso (NED)	Alpecin–Deceuninck	+ 0"
8	Natnael Tesfatsion (ERI)	Movistar Team	+ 0"
9	Mathias Vacek (CZE)	Lidl–Trek	+ 0"
10	Toon Aerts (BEL)	Lotto	+ 0"

General classification after Stage 1
Rank	Rider	Team	Time
1	Corbin Strong (NZL)	Israel–Premier Tech	4h 13' 50"
2	Rasmus Tiller (NOR)	Uno-X Mobility	+ 4"
3	Anders Foldager (DEN)	Team Jayco–AlUla	+ 6"
4	Oliver Knight (GBR)	Cofidis	+ 10"
5	Sandy Dujardin (FRA)	Team TotalEnergies	+ 10"
6	Jelte Krijnsen (NED)	Team Jayco–AlUla	+ 10"
7	Tibor Del Grosso (NED)	Alpecin–Deceuninck	+ 10"
8	Natnael Tesfatsion (ERI)	Movistar Team	+ 10"
9	Mathias Vacek (CZE)	Lidl–Trek	+ 10"
10	Toon Aerts (BEL)	Lotto	+ 10"

=== Stage 2 ===
27 July 2025 — Huy to Sambreville, 153.1 km (95.1 mi)

Stage 2 Result
Rank	Rider	Team	Time
1	Oliver Knight (GBR)	Cofidis	3h 25' 49"
2	Lorenzo Milesi (ITA)	Movistar Team	+ 0"
3	Louis Rouland (FRA)	Arkéa–B&B Hotels	+ 0"
4	Sandy Dujardin (FRA)	Team TotalEnergies	+ 0"
5	Luca Mozzato (ITA)	Arkéa–B&B Hotels	+ 0"
6	Kim Heiduk (GER)	INEOS Grenadiers	+ 0"
7	Lewis Bower (NZL)	Groupama–FDJ	+ 0"
8	Mathias Vacek (CZE)	Lidl–Trek	+ 0"
9	Milan Fretin (BEL)	Cofidis	+ 0"
10	Corbin Strong (NZL)	Israel–Premier Tech	+ 0"

General classification after Stage 2
Rank	Rider	Team	Time
1	Oliver Knight (GBR)	Cofidis	7h 39' 38"
2	Corbin Strong (NZL)	Israel–Premier Tech	+ 1"
3	Rasmus Tiller (NOR)	Uno-X Mobility	+ 5"
4	Louis Rouland (FRA)	Arkéa–B&B Hotels	+ 5"
5	Timo Kielich (BEL)	Alpecin–Deceuninck	+ 5"
6	Anders Foldager (DEN)	Team Jayco–AlUla	+ 7"
7	Filippo Magli (ITA)	VF Group–Bardiani–CSF–Faizanè	+ 7"
8	Olivier Godfroid (BEL)	Baloise Glowi Lions	+ 10"
9	Ceriel Desal (BEL)	Wagner Bazin WB	+ 10"
10	Sandy Dujardin (FRA)	Team TotalEnergies	+ 11"

=== Stage 3 ===
28 July 2025 — Estinnes to Antoing, 165.3 km (102.7 mi)

Stage 3 Result
Rank	Rider	Team	Time
1	Davide Donati (ITA)	Red Bull–Bora–Hansgrohe	3h 33' 23"
2	Milan Fretin (BEL)	Cofidis	+ 0"
3	Anders Foldager (DEN)	Team Jayco–AlUla	+ 0"
4	Corbin Strong (NZL)	Israel–Premier Tech	+ 0"
5	Tibor Del Grosso (NED)	Alpecin–Deceuninck	+ 0"
6	Henrik Pedersen (DEN)	Uno-X Mobility	+ 0"
7	Kim Heiduk (GER)	INEOS Grenadiers	+ 0"
8	Lewis Bower (NZL)	Groupama–FDJ	+ 0"
9	Timo Kielich (BEL)	Alpecin–Deceuninck	+ 0"
10	Toon Aerts (BEL)	Lotto	+ 0"

General classification after Stage 3
Rank	Rider	Team	Time
1	Oliver Knight (GBR)	Cofidis	11h 13' 01"
2	Corbin Strong (NZL)	Israel–Premier Tech	+ 1"
3	Anders Foldager (DEN)	Team Jayco–AlUla	+ 2"
4	Rasmus Tiller (NOR)	Uno-X Mobility	+ 5"
5	Milan Fretin (BEL)	Cofidis	+ 5"
6	Timo Kielich (BEL)	Alpecin–Deceuninck	+ 5"
7	Louis Rouland (FRA)	Arkéa–B&B Hotels	+ 5"
8	Filippo Magli (ITA)	VF Group–Bardiani–CSF–Faizanè	+ 7"
9	Mathias Vacek (CZE)	Lidl–Trek	+ 8"
10	Kim Heiduk (GER)	INEOS Grenadiers	+ 9"

=== Stage 4 ===
29 July 2025 — Welkenraedt to Seraing, 163.3 km (101.5 mi)

Stage 4 Result
Rank	Rider	Team	Time
1	Mathias Vacek (CZE)	Lidl–Trek	3h 53' 36"
2	Corbin Strong (NZL)	Israel–Premier Tech	+ 0"
3	Carlos Canal (ESP)	Movistar Team	+ 0"
4	Natnael Tesfatsion (ERI)	Movistar Team	+ 0"
5	Luca Mozzato (ITA)	Arkéa–B&B Hotels	+ 7"
6	Filippo Fiorelli (ITA)	VF Group–Bardiani–CSF–Faizanè	+ 7"
7	Sakarias Koller Løland (NOR)	Uno-X Mobility	+ 7"
8	Kim Heiduk (GER)	INEOS Grenadiers	+ 7"
9	Lorenzo Conforti (ITA)	VF Group–Bardiani–CSF–Faizanè	+ 7"
10	Timo Kielich (BEL)	Alpecin–Deceuninck	+ 7"

General classification after Stage 4
Rank	Rider	Team	Time
1	Corbin Strong (NZL)	Israel–Premier Tech	15h 06' 30"
2	Mathias Vacek (CZE)	Lidl–Trek	+ 1"
3	Oliver Knight (GBR)	Cofidis	+ 14"
4	Carlos Canal (ESP)	Movistar Team	+ 14"
5	Anders Foldager (DEN)	Team Jayco–AlUla	+ 16"
6	Natnael Tesfatsion (ERI)	Movistar Team	+ 18"
7	Timo Kielich (BEL)	Alpecin–Deceuninck	+ 19"
8	Vlad Van Mechelen (BEL)	Team Bahrain Victorious	+ 19"
9	Kim Heiduk (GER)	INEOS Grenadiers	+ 20"
10	Toon Aerts (BEL)	Lotto	+ 24"

=== Stage 5 ===
30 July 2025 — Bertrix to Bertrix, 183.3 km (113.9 mi)

Stage 5 Result
Rank	Rider	Team	Time
1	Clément Izquierdo (FRA)	Cofidis	4h 26' 39"
2	Corbin Strong (NZL)	Israel–Premier Tech	+ 0"
3	Lorenzo Milesi (ITA)	Movistar Team	+ 0"
4	Rémy Rochas (FRA)	Groupama–FDJ	+ 0"
5	Filippo Fiorelli (ITA)	VF Group–Bardiani–CSF–Faizanè	+ 0"
6	Gianni Marchand (BEL)	Tarteletto–Isorex	+ 0"
7	Toon Aerts (BEL)	Lotto	+ 0"
8	Nicolò Buratti (ITA)	Team Bahrain Victorious	+ 0"
9	Ben Swift (GBR)	INEOS Grenadiers	+ 0"
10	Tibor Del Grosso (NED)	Alpecin–Deceuninck	+ 2"

General classification after Stage 5
Rank	Rider	Team	Time
1	Corbin Strong (NZL)	Israel–Premier Tech	19h 33' 03"
2	Mathias Vacek (CZE)	Lidl–Trek	+ 9"
3	Oliver Knight (GBR)	Cofidis	+ 22"
4	Carlos Canal (ESP)	Movistar Team	+ 22"
5	Anders Foldager (DEN)	Team Jayco–AlUla	+ 24"
6	Natnael Tesfatsion (ERI)	Movistar Team	+ 26"
7	Vlad Van Mechelen (BEL)	Team Bahrain Victorious	+ 27"
8	Kim Heiduk (GER)	INEOS Grenadiers	+ 28"
9	Toon Aerts (BEL)	Lotto	+ 30"
10	Filippo Fiorelli (ITA)	VF Group–Bardiani–CSF–Faizanè	+ 31"

== Classification leadership table ==
Classification leadership by stage
Stage	Winner	General classification	Points classification	Mountains classification	Sprints classification	Young rider classification	Team classification
1	Corbin Strong	Corbin Strong	Corbin Strong	Kenneth Van Rooy	Kenay De Moyer	Anders Foldager	Team Jayco–AlUla
2	Oliver Knight	Oliver Knight	Oliver Knight	Kenneth Van Rooy	Timo Kielich	Louis Rouland	Team Jayco–AlUla
3	Davide Donati	Oliver Knight	Corbin Strong	Kenneth Van Rooy	Timo Kielich	Anders Foldager	Team Jayco–AlUla
4	Mathias Vacek	Corbin Strong	Corbin Strong	Vlad Van Mechelen	Mathias Vacek	Mathias Vacek	Movistar Team
5	Clément Izquierdo	Corbin Strong	Corbin Strong	Henri-François Renard-Haquin	Henri-François Renard-Haquin	Mathias Vacek	Movistar Team
Final		Corbin Strong	Corbin Strong	Henri-François Renard-Haquin	Henri-François Renard-Haquin	Mathias Vacek	Movistar Team

== Classification standings ==
Legend
Denotes the winner of the general classification	Denotes the winner of the sprints classification
Denotes the winner of the mountains classification	Denotes the winner of the points classification

=== General classification ===
Final general classification (1–10)
Rank	Rider	Team	Time
1	Corbin Strong (NZL)	Israel–Premier Tech	19h 33' 03"
2	Mathias Vacek (CZE)	Lidl–Trek	+ 9"
3	Oliver Knight (GBR)	Cofidis	+ 22"
4	Carlos Canal (ESP)	Movistar Team	+ 22"
5	Anders Foldager (DEN)	Team Jayco–AlUla	+ 24"
6	Natnael Tesfatsion (ERI)	XDS Astana Team	+ 26"
7	Vlad Van Mechelen (BEL)	Team Bahrain Victorious	+ 27"
8	Kim Heiduk (GER)	INEOS Grenadiers	+ 28"
9	Toon Aerts (BEL)	Lotto	+ 30"
10	Filippo Fiorelli (ITA)	VF Group–Bardiani–CSF–Faizanè	+ 31"

=== Points classification ===
Final points classification (1–10)
Rank	Rider	Team	Points
1	Corbin Strong (NZL)	Israel–Premier Tech	76
2	Oliver Knight (GBR)	Cofidis	35
3	Lorenzo Milesi (ITA)	Movistar Team	35
4	Mathias Vacek (CZE)	Lidl–Trek	30
5	Anders Foldager (DEN)	Team Jayco–AlUla	30
6	Davide Donati (ITA)	Red Bull–Bora–Hansgrohe	25
7	Clément Izquierdo (FRA)	Cofidis	25
8	Rasmus Tiller (NOR)	Uno-X Mobility	20
9	Sandy Dujardin (FRA)	Team TotalEnergies	18
10	Luca Mozzato (ITA)	Arkéa–B&B Hotels	16

=== Mountains classification ===
Final mountains classification (1–10)
Rank	Rider	Team	Points
1	Henri-François Renard-Haquin (FRA)	Wagner Bazin WB	72
2	Vlad Van Mechelen (BEL)	Team Bahrain Victorious	48
3	Tom Donnenwirth (FRA)	Groupama–FDJ	28
4	Kenneth Van Rooy (BEL)	Wagner Bazin WB	22
5	Matevž Govekar (SLO)	Team Bahrain Victorious	22
6	Filip Maciejuk (POL)	Red Bull–Bora–Hansgrohe	22
7	David Haverdings (NED)	Baloise Glowi Lions	20
8	Alessandro Borgo (ITA)	Team Bahrain Victorious	18
9	Rémy Rochas (FRA)	Groupama–FDJ	16
10	Lorenzo Milesi (ITA)	Movistar Team	14

=== Sprints classification ===
Final sprints classification (1–10)
Rank	Rider	Team	Points
1	Henri-François Renard-Haquin (FRA)	Wagner Bazin WB	25
2	Mathias Vacek (CZE)	Lidl–Trek	11
3	Lorenzo Milesi (ITA)	Movistar Team	11
4	Vlad Van Mechelen (BEL)	Team Bahrain Victorious	10
5	Timo Kielich (BEL)	Alpecin–Deceuninck	10
6	Kenay De Moyer (BEL)	Pauwels Sauzen–Cibel Clementines	10
7	Kim Heiduk (GER)	INEOS Grenadiers	7
8	Ludovic Robeet (BEL)	Cofidis	6
9	Filippo Magli (ITA)	VF Group–Bardiani–CSF–Faizanè	6
10	Kenneth Van Rooy (BEL)	Wagner Bazin WB	6

=== Young rider classification ===
Final young rider classification (1–10)
Rank	Rider	Team	Time
1	Mathias Vacek (CZE)	Lidl–Trek	19h 33' 12"
2	Anders Foldager (DEN)	Team Jayco–AlUla	+ 15"
3	Vlad Van Mechelen (BEL)	Team Bahrain Victorious	+ 18"
4	Tibor Del Grosso (NED)	Alpecin–Deceuninck	+ 24"
5	Alexander Hajek (AUT)	Red Bull–Bora–Hansgrohe	+ 24"
6	Lorenzo Germani (ITA)	Groupama–FDJ	+ 24"
7	Louis Rouland (FRA)	Arkéa–B&B Hotels	+ 1' 12"
8	Sakarias Koller Løland (NOR)	Uno-X Mobility	+ 1' 33"
9	Lars Craps (BEL)	Lotto	+ 1' 49"
10	Lorenzo Conforti (ITA)	VF Group–Bardiani–CSF–Faizanè	+ 2' 05"

=== Team classification ===
Final team classification (1–10)
Rank	Team	Time
1	(Spain) Movistar Team	58h 40' 32"
2	(France) Cofidis	+ 14"
3	(Belgium) Intermarché–Wanty	+ 1' 33"
4	(Belgium) Lotto	+ 1' 39"
5	(Belgium) Alpecin–Deceuninck	+ 2' 43"
6	(Norway) Uno-X Mobility	+ 3' 42"
7	Team Bahrain Victorious	+ 3' 48"
8	(France) Arkéa–B&B Hotels	+ 5' 31"
9	(United Kingdom) INEOS Grenadiers	+ 5' 32"
10	(France) Groupama–FDJ	+ 7' 28"
