= Noa Isidore =

French cyclist

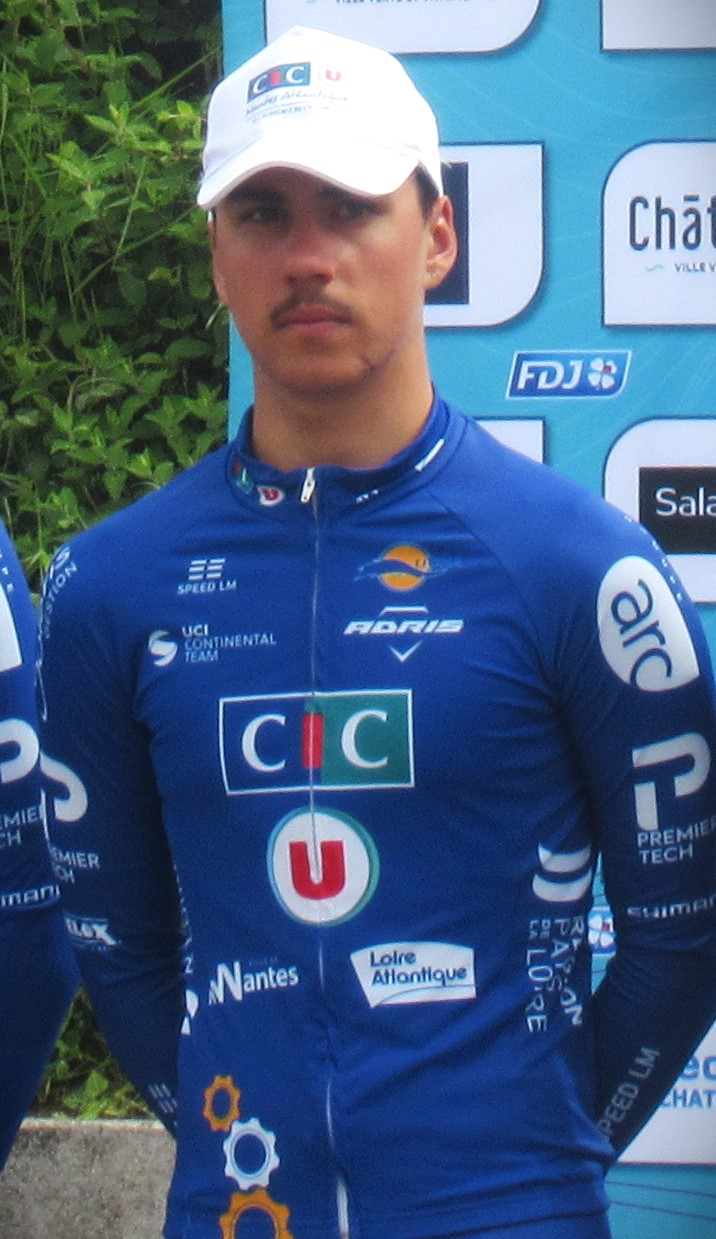
- Isidore in 2023

Personal information
- Born: 17 September 2004 (age 22) Troyes, France
- Height: 1.80 m (5 ft 11 in)
- Weight: 67 kg (148 lb)

Cycling career
- Sport: Cycling
- Current team: Decathlon CMA CGM Team
- Discipline: Road
- Role: Rider

Amateur teams
- 2015–2020: UV Aube-Club Champagne Charlott
- 2021–2022: AG2R Citroën U19 Team

Professional teams
- 2023: CIC U Nantes Atlantique
- 2024: Decathlon–AG2R La Mondiale Development Team
- 2025–: Decathlon–AG2R La Mondiale

Major wins
- One-day races and Classics Coppa Bernocchi (2026)

Noa Isidore (born 17 September 2004) is a French road cyclist, who rides for UCI WorldTeam Decathlon CMA CGM Team.

== Major results ==
2021
1st Gran Premio Eccellenze Valli del Soligo
4th Road race, National Junior Road Championships
5th Overall Saarland Trofeo
2022
1st Overall La Philippe Gilbert Juniors

1st Stage 1

3rd Ronde van Vlaanderen Juniores
7th Overall Aubel–Thimister–Stavelot

1st Stage 2a (TTT)

7th Overall Ain Bugey Valromey Tour

1st Points classification
1st Stage 1

8th Road race, European Junior Road Championships
9th Kuurne–Brussels–Kuurne Juniors
2023
1st Overall Tour d'Eure-et-Loir

1st Young rider classification
1st Stage 1

1st Stage 2 Alpes Isère Tour
7th Gent–Wevelgem U23
10th Overall Kreiz Breizh Elites
2024
National Under-23 Road Championships

1st Road race
5th Time trial

1st Overall Istrian Spring Trophy

1st Points classification
1st Stage 2

2nd Umag Trophy
2nd Ronde van de Achterhoek
5th Poreč Trophy
8th Route Adélie
9th Overall Tour of Britain
2025
9th Route Adélie de Vitré
2026 (3 pro wins)
1st Coppa Bernocchi
Tour du Limousin

1st Stages 1 & 4

2nd Grand Prix du Morbihan
3rd Overall Boucles de la Mayenne
4th Polynormande
