= Clément Izquierdo =

French cyclist

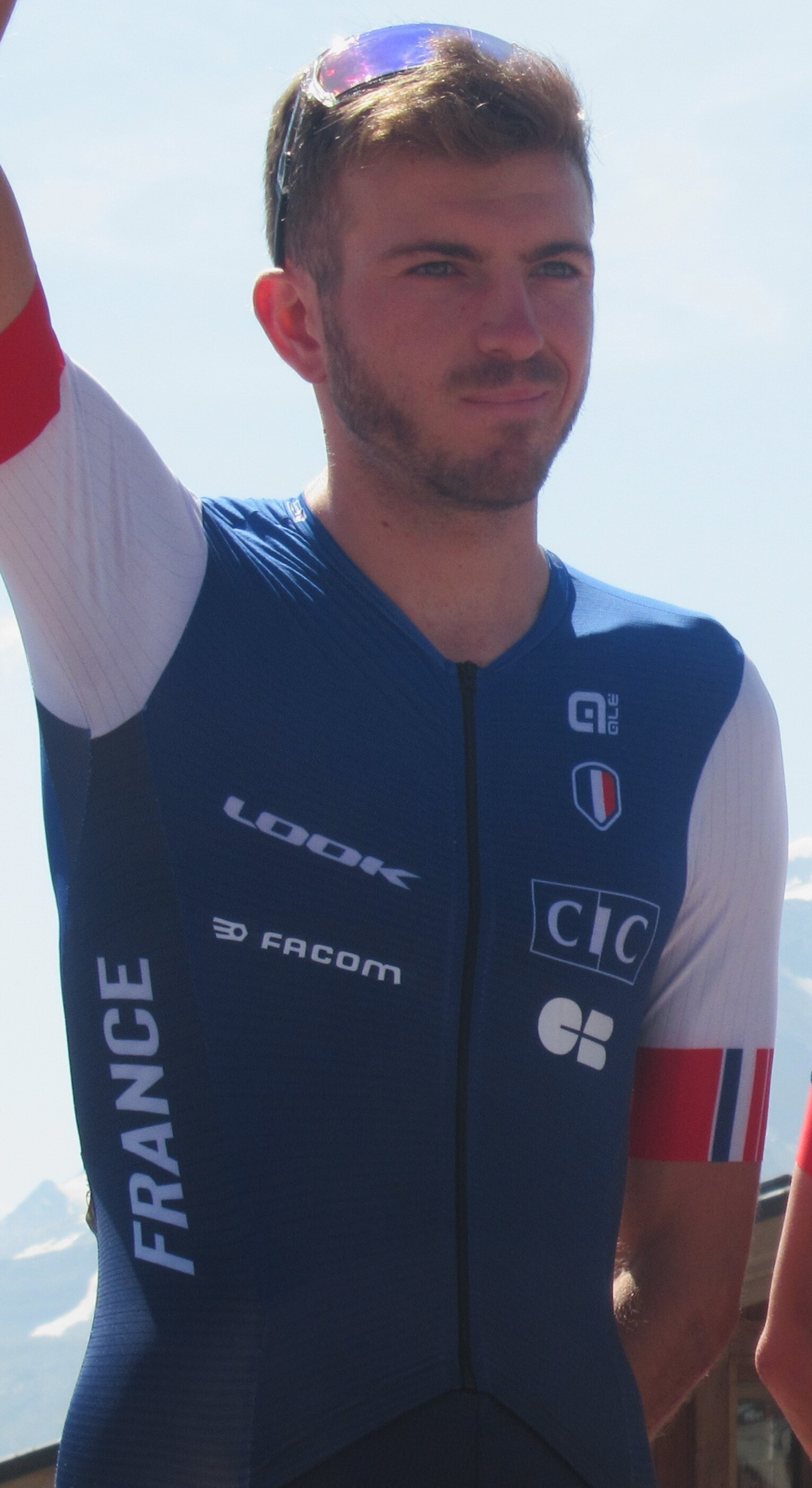
- Izquierdo in 2024

Personal information
- Born: 16 February 2002 (age 24) Marseille, France

Cycling career
- Sport: Cycling
- Current team: Cofidis
- Discipline: Road
- Role: Rider

Amateur team
- 2023–2024: AVC Aix-en-Provence

Professional team
- 2025–: Cofidis

Clément Izquierdo (born 16 February 2002) is a French professional racing cyclist, who currently rides for UCI WorldTeam Cofidis.

== Major results ==
2022
1st GP de la Saint-Romain
6th Overall Tour des Alpes de Haute Provence

1st Stage 1

2023
1st Overall Vuelta Ciclistica a Hispania

1st Stages 2 (TTT) & 4

7th Overall Tour du Beaujolais
2024
1st Classique Puisaye-Forterre
1st Grand Prix du Pays d'Aix
2nd Annemasse-Bellegarde et retour
2nd Grand Prix de Puyloubier
2nd Circuit des communes de la vallée du Bédat
2nd Grand Prix de Saint-Étienne Loire
2nd Tour de Basse-Navarre
3rd Overall Tour du Beaujolais
3rd Overall Tour Nivernais Morvan
4th Le Poinçonnet-Panazol
4th Ronde du Pays Basque
5th Trophée de l'Essor
6th Overall Tour de la Mirabelle

1st Stage 2

8th Overall Tour de Moselle

1st Stage 2

10th Trophée Roger-Walkowiak
2025 (1 pro win)
1st Stage 5 Tour de Wallonie
1st Young rider classification, Étoile de Bessèges
9th Overall Boucles de la Mayenne
2026
8th Overall Étoile de Bessèges
8th Giro del Veneto
