= Théo Delacroix =

French cyclist

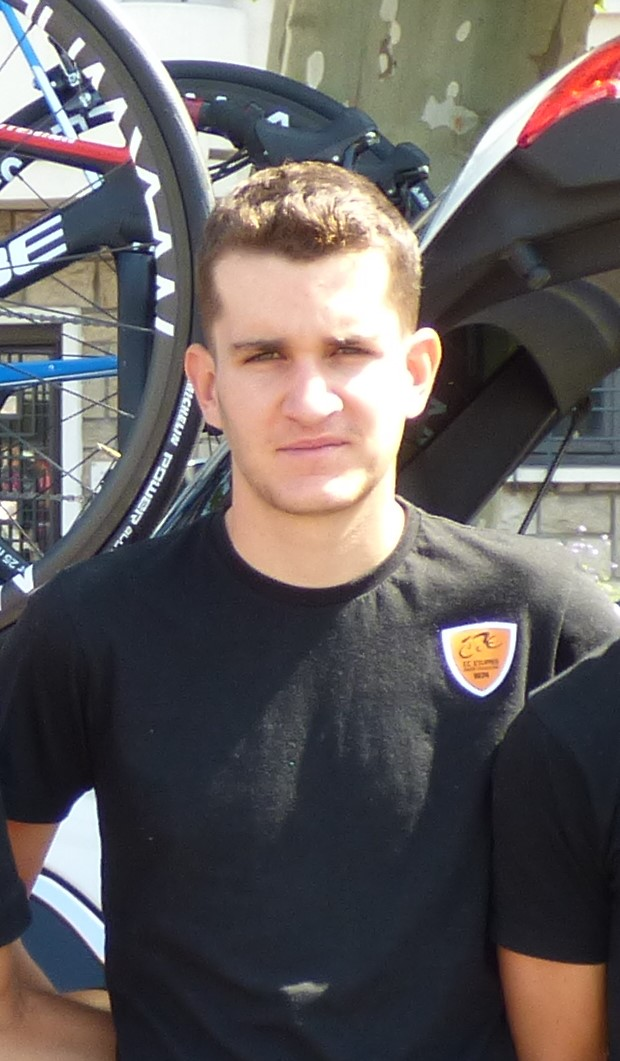
- Delacroix in 2019

Personal information
- Born: 21 February 1999 (age 27) Lons-le-Saunier, Jura
- Height: 1.86 m (6 ft 1 in)
- Weight: 70 kg (154 lb)

Cycling career
- Sport: Cycling
- Current team: St. Michel–Preference Home–Auber93
- Discipline: Road
- Role: Rider

Amateur teams
- 2016–2017: Jura Cyclisme Junior
- 2018–2020: CC Étupes

Professional teams
- 2020: Circus–Wanty Gobert
- 2021–2022: Intermarché–Wanty–Gobert Matériaux
- 2023–: St. Michel–Mavic–Auber93

Théo Delacroix (born 21 February 1999) is a French cyclist, who currently rides for UCI Continental team St. Michel–Preference Home–Auber93.

== Major results ==
2017
2nd La Classique des Alpes Juniors
2019
1st Road race, National Under–23 Road Championships
9th Liège–Bastogne–Liège Espoirs
2023
2nd Grand Prix de Plouay
9th Overall Tour d'Eure-et-Loir
2024
1st Grand Prix de la ville de Pérenchies
2nd Overall Tour d'Eure-et-Loir
4th Grand Prix de la Ville de Lillers
2025
8th Overall Tour Poitou-Charentes en Nouvelle-Aquitaine
