= Domessargues =

- Commune
- Coat of arms
- Location of Domessargues
- Location within France Location within Occitanie
- Coordinates: 43°58′39″N 4°10′11″E
- Country: France
- Region: Occitania
- Department: Gard
- Arrondissement: Nîmes
- Canton: Quissac
- Intercommunality: CA Nîmes Métropole

Government
  - Mayor (2020–2026): Bernard Clement
- Area^{1}: 7.32 km^{2} (2.83 sq mi)
- Elevation: 160 m (520 ft)
- Highest elevation: 235 m (771 ft)
- Lowest elevation: 99 m (325 ft)
- Population (2023): 782
  - Density: 107/km^{2} (277/sq mi)
- Time zone: UTC+01:00 (CET)
  - Summer (DST): UTC+02:00 (CEST)
- INSEE/Postal code: 30104 /30350
- ^{1} French Land Register data, which excludes lakes, ponds, glaciers > 1 km^{2} (0.386 sq mi or 247 acres) and river estuaries.

Domessargues (French pronunciation: [dɔmesaʁɡ]; Occitan: Domençargues) is a commune in the Gard department in southern France.

== Population ==
Historical population
| Year | Pop. | ±% p.a. |
|---|---|---|
| 1968 | 148 | — |
| 1975 | 148 | +0.00% |
| 1982 | 177 | +2.59% |
| 1990 | 251 | +4.46% |
| 1999 | 420 | +5.89% |
| 2007 | 669 | +5.99% |
| 2012 | 691 | +0.65% |
| 2017 | 753 | +1.73% |
| 2023 | 782 | +0.63% |
Source: INSEE

== See also ==
- Communes of the Gard department
