= Brouzet-lès-Alès =

Commune in Occitanie, France

- Commune
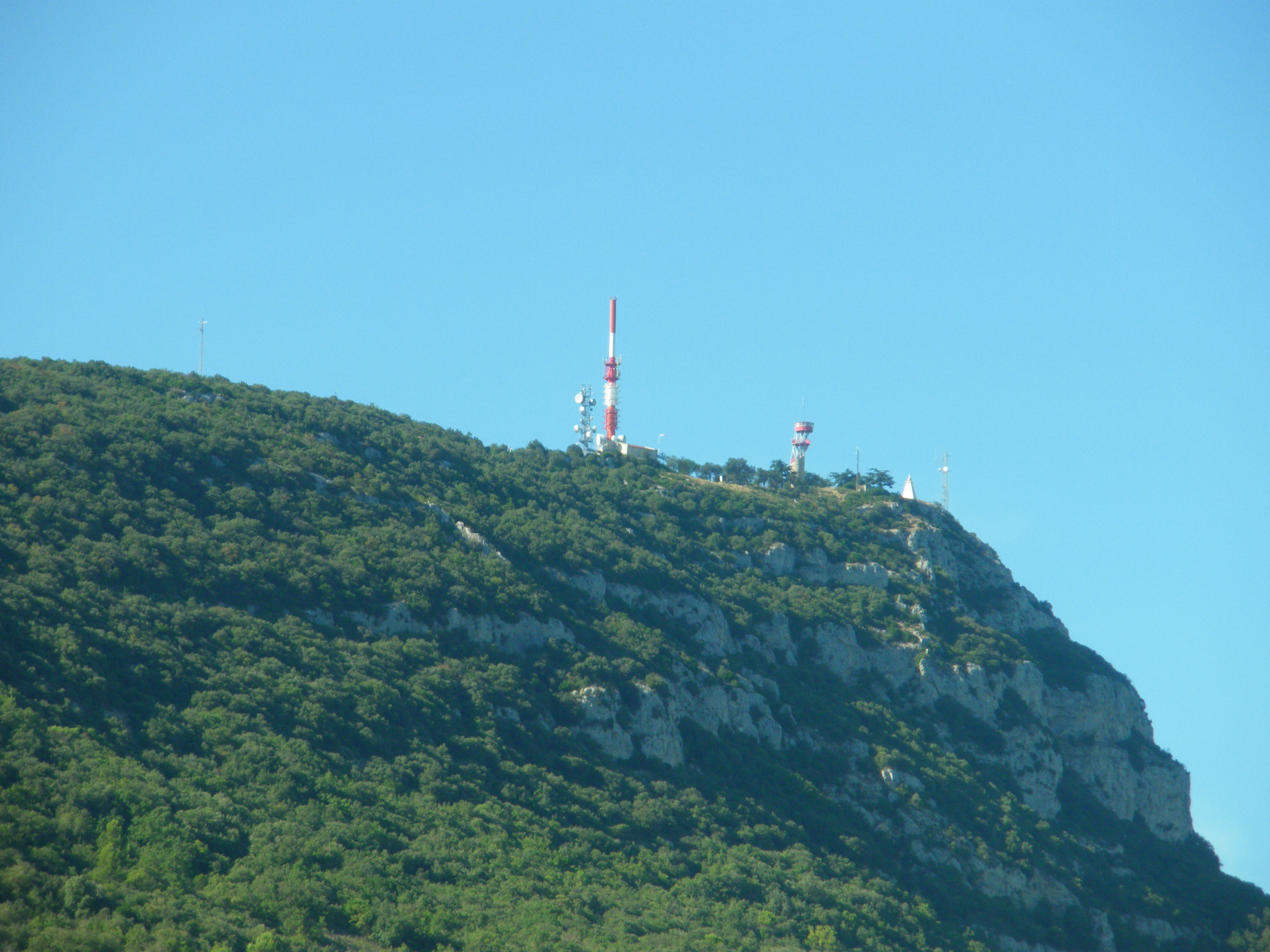
- Mont Bouquet

- Coat of arms
- Location of Brouzet-lès-Alès
- Location within France Location within Occitanie
- Coordinates: 44°08′18″N 4°14′49″E
- Country: France
- Region: Occitania
- Department: Gard
- Arrondissement: Alès
- Canton: Alès-2
- Intercommunality: Alès Agglomération

Government
  - Mayor (2020–2026): Matthieu Testard
- Area^{1}: 13.03 km^{2} (5.03 sq mi)
- Elevation: 235 m (771 ft)
- Highest elevation: 623 m (2,044 ft)
- Lowest elevation: 159 m (522 ft)
- Population (2023): 670
  - Density: 51/km^{2} (130/sq mi)
- Time zone: UTC+01:00 (CET)
  - Summer (DST): UTC+02:00 (CEST)
- INSEE/Postal code: 30055 /30580
- ^{1} French Land Register data, which excludes lakes, ponds, glaciers > 1 km^{2} (0.386 sq mi or 247 acres) and river estuaries.

Brouzet-lès-Alès (French pronunciation: [bʁuzɛ lɛ.z‿alɛs], literally Brouzet near Alès; Occitan: Broset d'Alès) is a commune in the Gard department in southern France.

== Geography ==
=== Climate ===
Brouzet-lès-Alès has a humid subtropical climate (Köppen climate classification Cfa). The average annual temperature in Brouzet-lès-Alès is 13.5 °C (56.3 °F). The average annual rainfall is 923.9 mm (36.37 in) with November as the wettest month. The temperatures are highest on average in July, at around 22.9 °C (73.2 °F), and lowest in January, at around 5.4 °C (41.7 °F). The highest temperature ever recorded in Brouzet-lès-Alès was 39.8 °C (103.6 °F) on 28 June 2019; the coldest temperature ever recorded was −11.7 °C (10.9 °F) on 5 February 2012.

Climate data for Brouzet-lès-Alès (1991−2020 normals, extremes 2011−present)
| Month | Jan | Feb | Mar | Apr | May | Jun | Jul | Aug | Sep | Oct | Nov | Dec | Year |
|---|---|---|---|---|---|---|---|---|---|---|---|---|---|
| Record high °C (°F) | 19.0 (66.2) | 21.4 (70.5) | 24.0 (75.2) | 27.0 (80.6) | 30.1 (86.2) | 39.8 (103.6) | 35.9 (96.6) | 37.5 (99.5) | 33.6 (92.5) | 28.2 (82.8) | 21.5 (70.7) | 17.5 (63.5) | 39.8 (103.6) |
| Mean daily maximum °C (°F) | 8.2 (46.8) | 9.0 (48.2) | 13.4 (56.1) | 16.6 (61.9) | 20.1 (68.2) | 25.3 (77.5) | 28.6 (83.5) | 28.0 (82.4) | 23.3 (73.9) | 17.4 (63.3) | 11.9 (53.4) | 9.3 (48.7) | 17.6 (63.7) |
| Daily mean °C (°F) | 5.4 (41.7) | 5.5 (41.9) | 9.3 (48.7) | 12.2 (54.0) | 15.4 (59.7) | 20.1 (68.2) | 22.9 (73.2) | 22.6 (72.7) | 18.8 (65.8) | 14.0 (57.2) | 9.1 (48.4) | 6.6 (43.9) | 13.5 (56.3) |
| Mean daily minimum °C (°F) | 2.5 (36.5) | 2.0 (35.6) | 5.1 (41.2) | 7.8 (46.0) | 10.6 (51.1) | 14.9 (58.8) | 17.3 (63.1) | 17.2 (63.0) | 14.2 (57.6) | 10.6 (51.1) | 6.4 (43.5) | 3.9 (39.0) | 9.4 (48.9) |
| Record low °C (°F) | −6.4 (20.5) | −11.7 (10.9) | −3.8 (25.2) | −1.4 (29.5) | 2.2 (36.0) | 6.9 (44.4) | 10.5 (50.9) | 9.6 (49.3) | 4.9 (40.8) | −0.7 (30.7) | −4.1 (24.6) | −4.5 (23.9) | −11.7 (10.9) |
| Average precipitation mm (inches) | 79.2 (3.12) | 54.2 (2.13) | 80.1 (3.15) | 82.7 (3.26) | 59.8 (2.35) | 46.5 (1.83) | 49.0 (1.93) | 55.4 (2.18) | 99.0 (3.90) | 112.3 (4.42) | 156.6 (6.17) | 49.1 (1.93) | 923.9 (36.37) |
| Average precipitation days (≥ 1.0 mm) | 7.4 | 5.4 | 6.7 | 7.7 | 6.8 | 5.5 | 5.1 | 4.5 | 4.3 | 6.9 | 9.4 | 7.1 | 76.8 |
Source: Météo-France

== Population ==
Historical population
| Year | Pop. | ±% p.a. |
|---|---|---|
| 1968 | 342 | — |
| 1975 | 343 | +0.04% |
| 1982 | 348 | +0.21% |
| 1990 | 392 | +1.50% |
| 1999 | 436 | +1.19% |
| 2007 | 570 | +3.41% |
| 2012 | 625 | +1.86% |
| 2017 | 649 | +0.76% |
| 2023 | 670 | +0.53% |
Source: INSEE

== See also ==
- Communes of the Gard department
