= Davide Donati (cyclist) =

Italian cyclist

- Donati at the 2023 UCI Road World Championships

Personal information
- Born: 8 April 2005 (age 21)
- Height: 1.86 m (6 ft 1 in)

Cycling career
- Sport: Cycling
- Current team: Red Bull–Bora–Hansgrohe Rookies
- Discipline: Road
- Role: Rider

Amateur team
- 2022–2023: Ciclistica Trevigliese

Professional teams
- 2024: Biesse–Carrera
- 2025–: Red Bull–Bora–Hansgrohe Rookies

Davide Donati (born 8 April 2005) is an Italian cyclist, who currently rides for UCI Continental team Red Bull–Bora–Hansgrohe Rookies. He took his first professional win in July 2025, winning stage three of the Tour de Wallonie in a bunch sprint.

== Major results ==
2022
2nd Time trial, National Junior Road Championships
2023
1st Chrono des Nations Juniors
1st Trofeo Comune di Vertova
1st Stage 2 Tour du Valromey
2nd Time trial, National Junior Road Championships
4th Overall Grand Prix Rüebliland
2024
1st Gran Premio della Liberazione
2nd Coppa San Geo
2nd Giro del Belvedere
8th Overall Tour de la Mirabelle
8th Popolarissima
10th Giro del Medio Brenta
2025 (1 pro win)
1st Time trial, National Under-23 Road Championships
1st Stage 3 Tour de Wallonie
5th Boucle de l'Artois
2026 (2)
1st Paris–Roubaix Espoirs
Giro di Sardegna

1st Points classification
1st Stages 2 & 5

1st Stage 2 Giro Next Gen
7th Coppa Bernocchi
