= Henri-François Renard-Haquin =

French cyclist (born 2002)

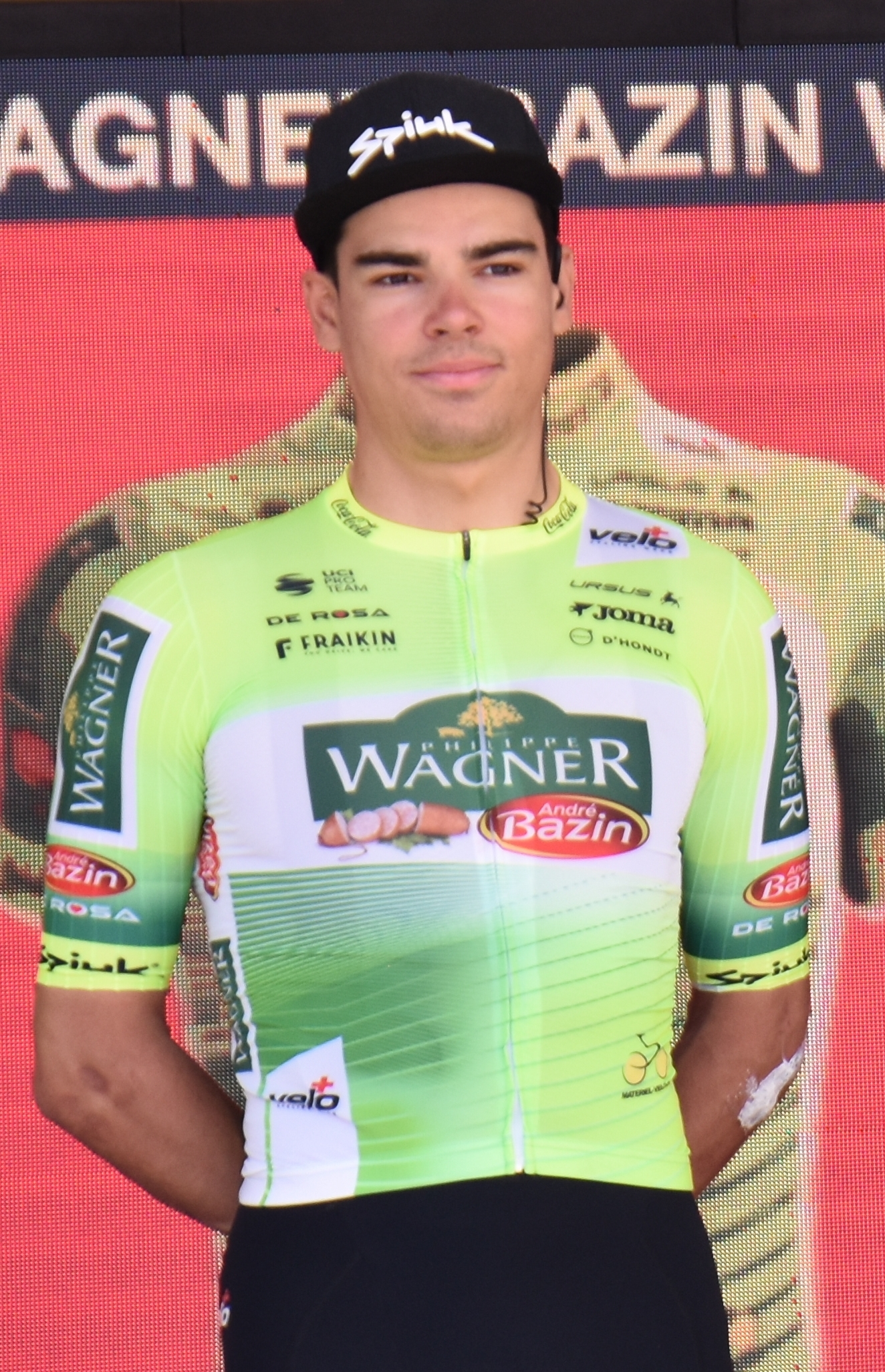
- Renard-Haquin in 2025

Personal information
- Born: 12 December 2002 (age 23) Dijon, France
- Height: 1.85 m (6 ft 1 in)
- Weight: 74 kg (163 lb)

Cycling career
- Sport: Cycling
- Current team: Team Picnic–PostNL
- Discipline: Road
- Role: Rider

Amateur teams
- 2019–2021: Team Prodialog–David Derepas
- 2022–2024: CC Étupes

Professional teams
- 2024: St. Michel–Mavic–Auber93 (stagiaire)
- 2025: Wagner Bazin WB
- 2026–: Team Picnic–PostNL

Henri-François Renard-Haquin (born 12 December 2002) is a French professional road cyclist, who currently rides for UCI WorldTeam Team Picnic–PostNL.

== Major results ==
2024
1st Stage 4 Tour Alsace
2025
Tour de Wallonie

1st Mountains classification
1st Sprints classification
