= Vlad Van Mechelen =

Belgian cyclist

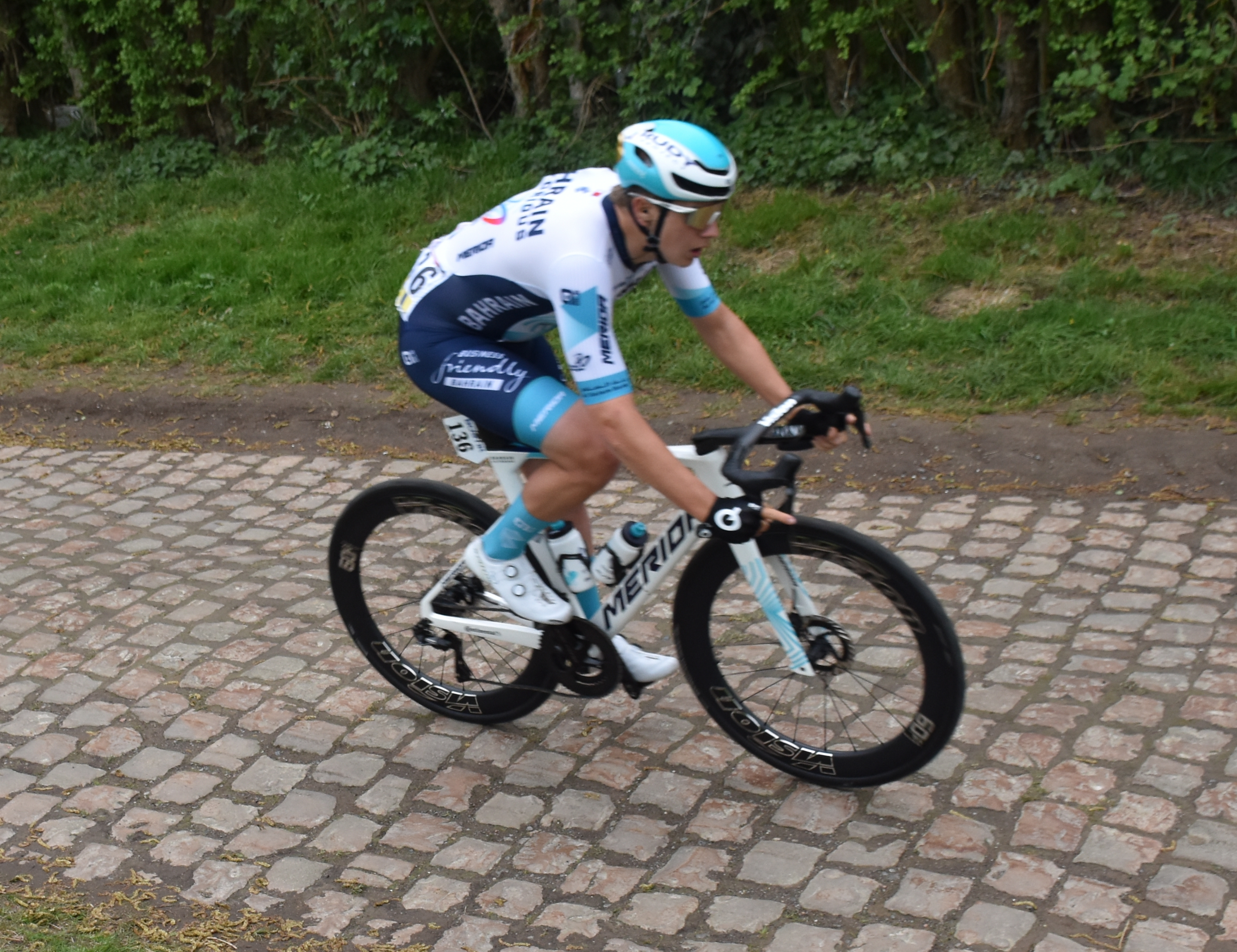
- Van Mechelen at the 2025 Paris–Roubaix

Personal information
- Born: 2 June 2004 (age 22) Leuven, Belgium
- Height: 1.70 m (5 ft 7 in)
- Weight: 65 kg (143 lb)

Cycling career
- Sport: Cycling
- Current team: Team Bahrain Victorious
- Discipline: Road
- Role: Rider

Amateur team
- 2021–2022: Cannibal Team

Professional teams
- 2023–2024: Development Team DSM
- 2024: Team Bahrain Victorious (stagiaire)
- 2025–: Team Bahrain Victorious
Medal record
Representing Belgium
Men's road bicycle racing
World Championships
Bronze medal – third place	2022 Wollongong	Junior road race

Vlad Van Mechelen (born 2 June 2004) is a Belgian cyclist, who currently rides for UCI WorldTeam Team Bahrain Victorious.

== Major results ==
2021
4th Road race, UEC European Junior Championships
4th Paris–Roubaix Juniors
7th Overall Course de la Paix Juniors
8th Road race, UCI Junior Road World Championships
2022
1st Guido Reybrouck Classic
Trophée Centre Morbihan

1st Points classification
1st Stage 1

2nd Overall Manavgat Side Junior

1st Stage 2

2nd Giro di Primavera
3rd Road race, UCI Junior Road World Championships
3rd Overall Gipuzkoa Klasika
3rd La Route des Géants
7th Overall Course de la Paix Juniors
8th Overall Watersley Junior Challenge
9th Paris–Roubaix Juniors
10th Overall Aubel–Thimister–Stavelot
2023
5th Brussel-Opwijk
7th Overall Tour de Bretagne
8th Youngster Coast Challenge
2024
3rd Ster van Zwolle
5th Dorpenomloop Rucphen
5th Paris–Roubaix Espoirs
6th Gent–Wevelgem U23
2025
7th Overall Tour de Wallonie
8th Super 8 Classic
2026
3rd Time trial, National Road Championships
8th Clàssica Comunitat Valenciana 1969
