= Bais, Mayenne =

Bais
- Commune
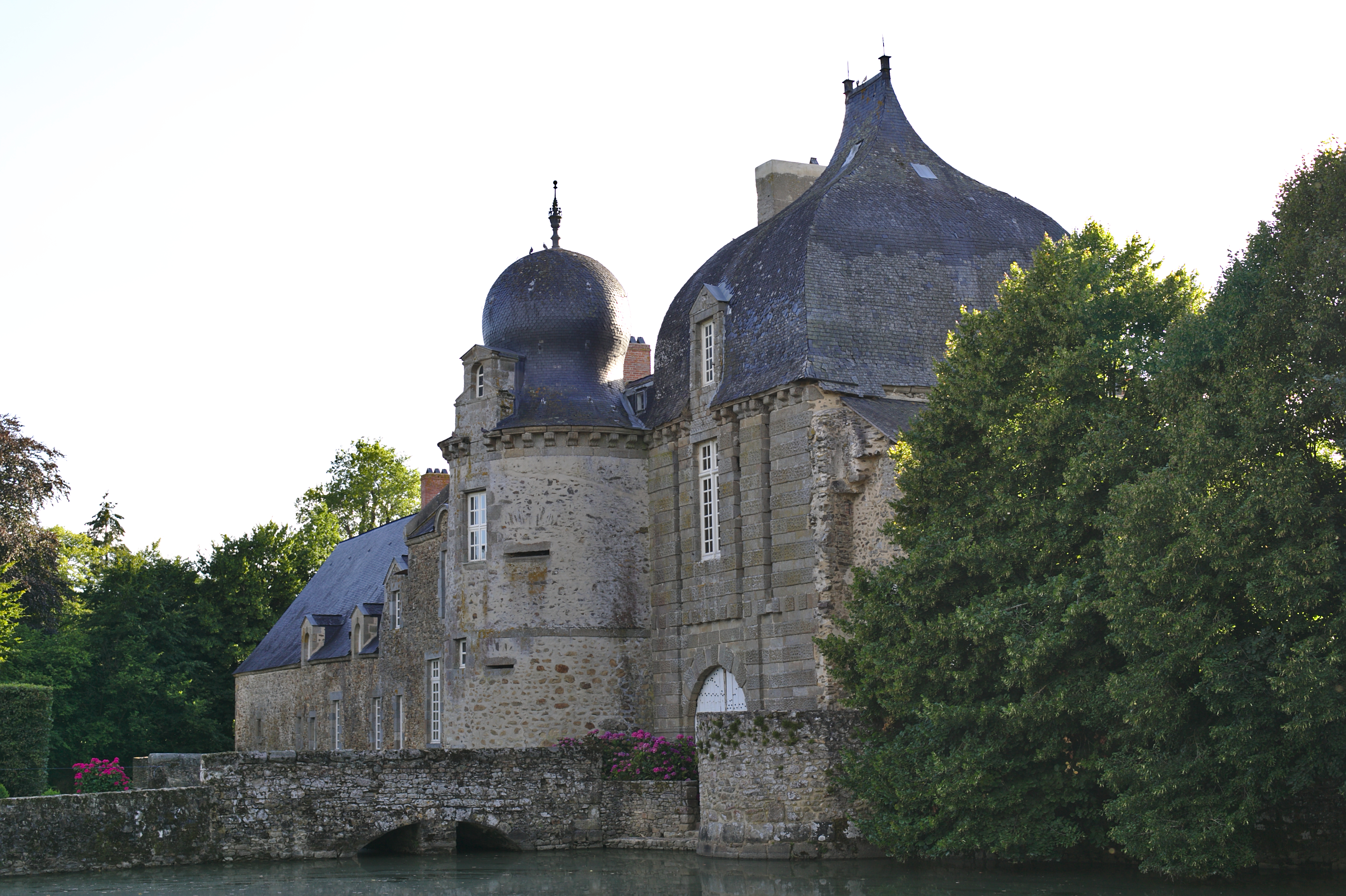
- The Château de Montesson, in Bais

- Coat of arms
- Location of Bais
- Location within France Location within Pays de la Loire
- Coordinates: 48°15′15″N 0°21′51″W
- Country: France
- Region: Pays de la Loire
- Department: Mayenne
- Arrondissement: Mayenne
- Canton: Évron

Government
  - Mayor (2020–2026): Marie-Cécile Morice
- Area^{1}: 26.23 km^{2} (10.13 sq mi)
- Elevation: 183 m (600 ft)
- Highest elevation: 337 m (1,106 ft)
- Lowest elevation: 155 m (509 ft)
- Population (2023): 1,222
  - Density: 46.59/km^{2} (120.7/sq mi)
- Time zone: UTC+01:00 (CET)
  - Summer (DST): UTC+02:00 (CEST)
- INSEE/Postal code: 53016 /53160
- ^{1} French Land Register data, which excludes lakes, ponds, glaciers > 1 km^{2} (0.386 sq mi or 247 acres) and river estuaries.

Bais is a commune in the Mayenne department in northwestern France.

== Population ==
Historical population
| Year | Pop. | ±% p.a. |
|---|---|---|
| 1968 | 1,105 | — |
| 1975 | 1,251 | +1.79% |
| 1982 | 1,457 | +2.20% |
| 1990 | 1,571 | +0.95% |
| 1999 | 1,487 | −0.61% |
| 2007 | 1,340 | −1.29% |
| 2012 | 1,271 | −1.05% |
| 2017 | 1,239 | −0.51% |
| 2023 | 1,222 | −0.23% |
Source: INSEE

== See also ==
- Communes of Mayenne
