= Louis Rouland =

French cyclist

Personal information
- Born: 21 October 2002 (age 23) Le Mans, France
- Height: 1.84 m (6 ft 0 in)
- Weight: 55 kg (121 lb)

Cycling career
- Sport: Cycling
- Current team: Cofidis
- Discipline: Road
- Role: Rider

Amateur teams
- 2019–2020: Le Mans Sarthe Vélo
- 2021: VC Pays de Loudéac
- 2022–2023: Bourg-en-Bresse Ain Cyclisme

Professional teams
- 2022: B&B Hotels–KTM (stagiaire)
- 2024: Arkéa–B&B Hôtels Continentale
- 2025: Arkéa–B&B Hotels
- 2026: Cofidis

Louis Rouland (born 21 October 2002) is a French cyclist, who currently rides for UCI ProSeries team Cofidis.

== Major results ==
2022
8th Overall Grand Prix Jeseníky
2023
4th Road race, National Under-23 Road Championships
5th Overall Tour de la Mirabelle

1st Young rider classification

6th Overall Grand Prix Jeseníky
2024
3rd Road race, National Under-23 Road Championships
3rd Grand Prix de Plouay
5th Overall Circuit des Ardennes
7th Overall Giro della Valle d'Aosta
10th Overall Tour Alsace
2025
4th Overall Tour de l'Ain
2026
8th Tour du Jura
10th Overall Tour of Oman
