= Oliver Knight (cyclist) =

British cyclist

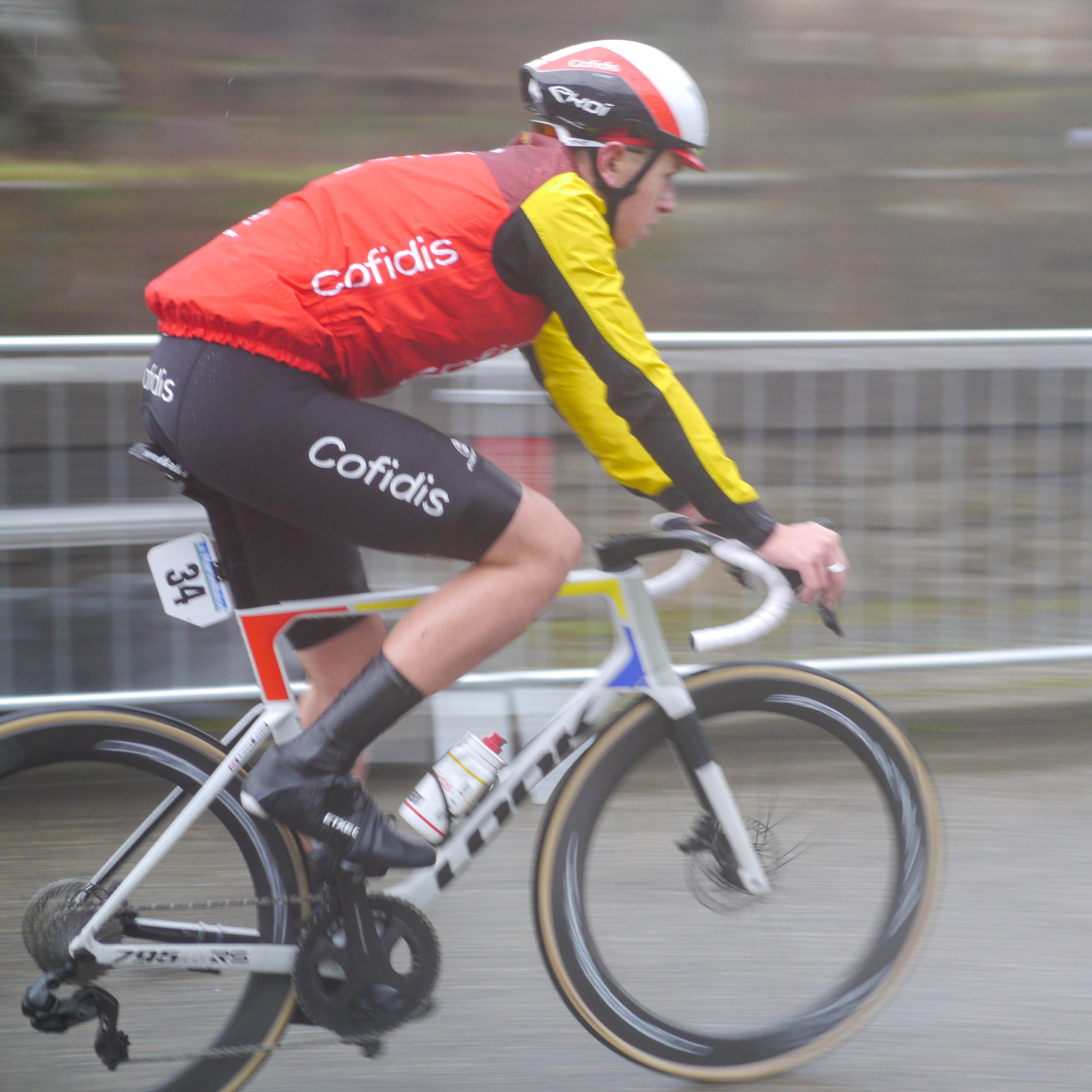
- Knight in 2025

Personal information
- Born: 25 January 2001 (age 25) Bedford, England

Cycling career
- Sport: Cycling
- Current team: Cofidis
- Discipline: Road
- Role: Rider
- Rider type: Time trialist

Amateur teams
- –2019: Corley Cycles
- 2019: HMT Hospitals Giant
- 2020–2021: AVC Aix-en-Provence

Professional teams
- 2022: UAE Team Emirates XRG (stagiaire)
- 2023: Cofidis (stagiaire)
- 2024–: Cofidis

Oliver Knight (born 25 January 2001), is a British cyclist who currently rides for UCI WorldTeam Cofidis.

== Career ==
From Bedford, Knight competed as a junior for the HMT Hospitals – Giant team and won a silver medal in the British junior national 10 mile championships, and finished second overall in the Junior Tour of the Basque Country behind Carlos Rodriguez, prior to joining French team AVC Aix-en-Provence for the 2020 and 2021 seasons. In 2022, he rode as a stagiaire for UAE Team Emirates XRG and made his debut at a UCI World Tour event at the Vuelta a Burgos. In 2023, he rode as a stagiaire with UCI WorldTeam Cofidis and ahead of the 2024 season signed a two-year contract with the team.

On 19 June 2024 he finished sixth at the British National Time Trial Championships in Catterick.

In June 2025, he finished third in the men's race at the British National Time Trial Championships.

== Major results ==
2019
2nd Overall Bizkaiko Itzulia
6th Overall Vuelta a Pamplona

1st Stage 4

2021
1st Grand Prix de la Saint-Pierre-Alleins
3rd Cursa Festes del Tura-Olot
5th GP de Cintegabelle
6th Overall Quatre Jours des As-en-Provence
6th GP Greolieres
8th Cronoescalada La Garriga
9th Overall Tour du Piémont Pyrénéen
2022
1st Overall Vuelta a Castellón

1st Stage 2

2nd Tour de Basse-Navarre
2nd Circuit de I'Essor
3rd Overall Tour du Pays Roannais

1st Points classification
1st Young rider classification

3rd Grand Prix de Saint-Étienne Loire
4th Overall Tour du Beaujolais
7th Paris–Troyes
7th Ronde du Pays Basque
7th Trophée de I'Essor
8th GP de Cintegabelle
9th Le Poinçonnet-Panazol
9th Overall Vuelta a Navarra

1st Stage 1

2023
1st Tour de Basse-Navarre
1st Trophée de I'Essor
1st Boucles du Haut-Var
1st Circuit des communes de la vallée du Bédat
1st Stage 2 Tour de Côte-d'Or
2nd Le Poinçonnet-Panazol
2nd Tour cycliste des 4B Sud Charente
3rd Ronde du Pays Basque
4th Grand Prix de Plouay
8th Overall Tour d'Eure-et-Loir
8th Tour du Gévaudan
2025 (1 pro win)
3rd Time trial, National Road Championships
3rd Overall Tour de Wallonie

1st Stage 2

7th Chrono des Nations

=== Grand Tour general classification results timeline ===
| Grand Tour | 2025 |
|---|---|
| Giro d'Italia | — |
| Tour de France | — |
| Vuelta a España | DNF |

Legend
| — | Did not compete |
| DNF | Did not finish |
