= 2025 Q36.5 Pro Cycling Team season =

Q36.5 Pro Cycling Team
- 2025 season
- UCI code: Q36
- Status: UCI ProTeam
- Manager: Douglas Ryder (RSA)
- Based: Switzerland
- Bicycles: Scott
- Groupset: SRAM

Season victories
- One-day races: 2
- Stage race overall: 1
- Stage race stages: 7
- National Championships: 1
- Most wins: Matteo Moschetti (ITA); Tom Pidcock (GBR) (4 wins each)

The 2025 season for the Q36.5 Pro Cycling Team is the 3rd season in the team's existence since it was rebranded.

== Team roster ==
As of 10 January 2025.

Rider	Date of birth
Enekoitz Azparren (ESP)	5 August 2002 (aged 22)
Xabier Azparren (ESP)	25 February 1999 (aged 25)
Matteo Badilatti (SUI)	30 July 1992 (aged 32)
Sjoerd Bax (NED)	6 January 1996 (aged 28)
Gianluca Brambilla (ITA)	22 August 1987 (aged 37)
Walter Calzoni (ITA)	8 August 2001 (aged 23)
Marcel Camprubi (ESP)	15 September 2001 (aged 23)
Fabio Christen (SUI)	29 June 2002 (aged 22)
David de la Cruz (ESP)	6 May 1989 (aged 35)
Mark Donovan (GBR)	3 April 1999 (aged 25)
Frederik Frison (BEL)	28 July 1992 (aged 32)
David González (ESP)	21 February 1996 (aged 28)
Damien Howson (AUS)	13 August 1992 (aged 32)

Rider	Date of birth
Emīls Liepiņš (LAT)	29 October 1992 (aged 32)
Kamil Małecki (POL)	2 January 1996 (aged 28)
Matteo Moschetti (ITA)	14 August 1996 (aged 28)
Giacomo Nizzolo (ITA)	30 January 1989 (aged 35)
Nicolò Parisini (ITA)	25 April 2000 (aged 24)
Joe Pidcock (GBR)	20 March 2002 (aged 22)
Tom Pidcock (GBR)	30 July 1999 (aged 25)
Jannik Steimle (GER)	4 April 1996 (aged 28)
Rory Townsend (IRE)	30 June 1995 (aged 29)
Milan Vader (NED)	18 February 1996 (aged 28)
Harm Vanhoucke (BEL)	17 June 1997 (aged 27)
Nickolas Zukowsky (CAN)	3 June 1998 (aged 26)

== Season victories ==
Date	Race	Competition	Rider	Country	Location	Ref.
29 January	AlUla Tour, stage 2	UCI Asia Tour	Tom Pidcock (GBR)	Saudi Arabia	Bir Jaydah Mountain Wirkah	
31 January	AlUla Tour, stage 4	UCI Asia Tour	Tom Pidcock (GBR)	Saudi Arabia	Skyviews of Harrat Uwayrid	
1 February	AlUla Tour, stage 5	UCI Asia Tour	Matteo Moschetti (ITA)	Saudi Arabia	AlUla Camel Cup Track	
1 February	AlUla Tour, overall	UCI Asia Tour	Tom Pidcock (GBR)	Saudi Arabia		
15 February	Vuelta a Murcia	UCI Europe Tour	Fabio Christen (SWI)	Spain	Murcia	
20 February	Vuelta a Andalucía, stage 2	UCI ProSeries	Tom Pidcock (GBR)	Spain	Torredelcampo	
8 March	Grand Prix Criquielion	UCI Europe Tour	Matteo Moschetti (ITA)	Belgium	Lessines	
2 April	Tour of Greece, stage 1	UCI Europe Tour	Matteo Moschetti (ITA)	Greece	Agrinio	
6 April	Tour of Greece, stage 5	UCI Europe Tour	Matteo Moschetti (ITA)	Greece	Syntagma, Athens	
5 June	Tour of Slovenia, stage 2	UCI ProSeries	Fabio Christen (SUI)	Slovenia	Rogaška Slatina	

== National, Continental, and World Champions ==
Date	Discipline	Jersey	Rider	Country	Location	Ref.
29 June	Irish National Road Race Championships		Rory Townsend (IRL)	Ireland	Yellow Furze	
