= 2025 Tour of Slovenia =

2025 UCI ProSeries
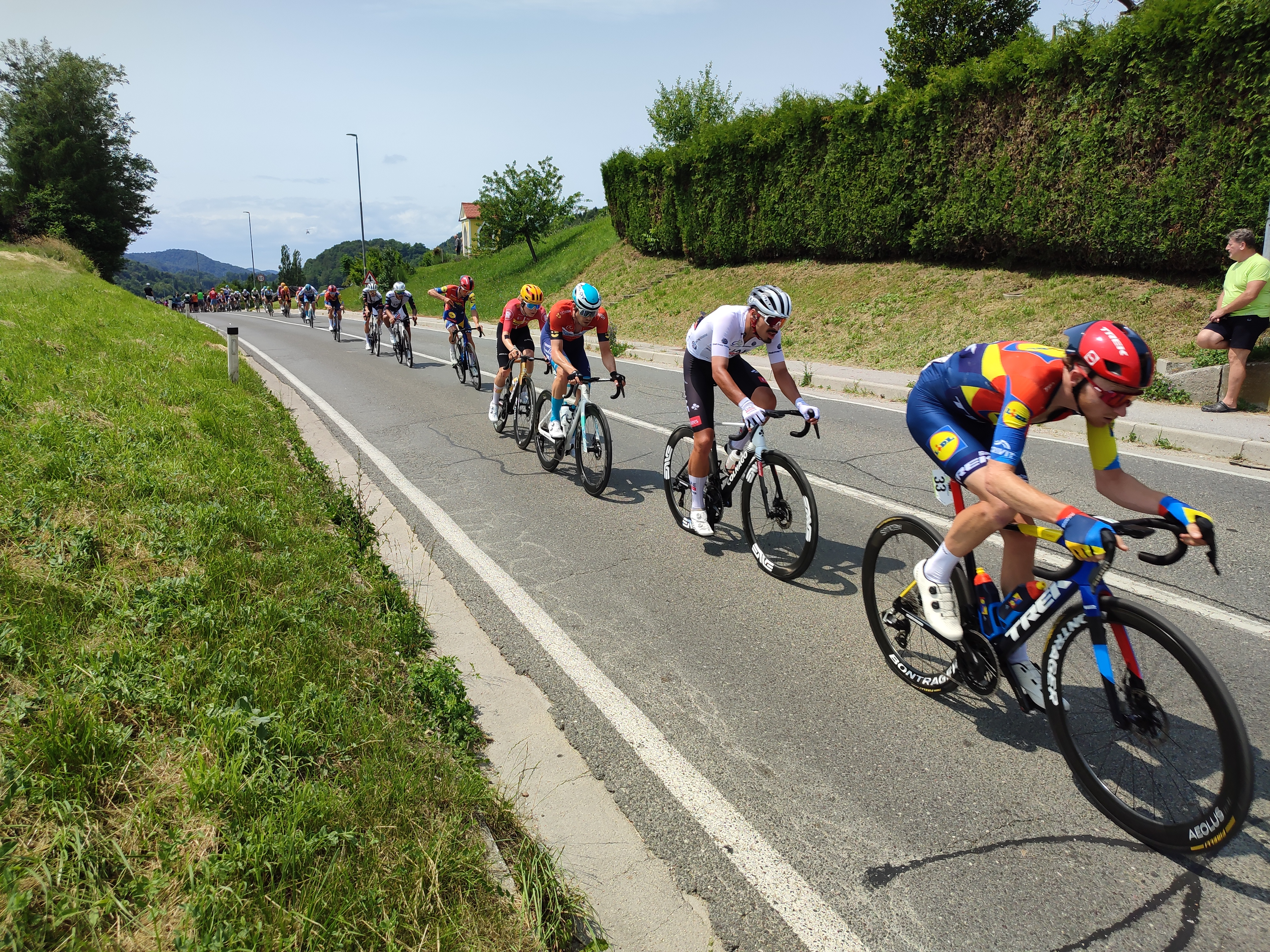
- Lead away group, Stage 2

Race details
- Dates: 4–8 June 2025
- Stages: 5
- Distance: 804.4 km (499.8 mi)
- Winning time: 19h 06' 07"

Results
Jersey awarded to the overall winner	Winner	Anders Halland Johannessen (NOR)	(Uno-X Mobility)
	Second	Felix Großschartner (AUT)	(UAE Team Emirates XRG)
	Third	Tao Geoghegan Hart (GBR)	(Lidl–Trek)
Jersey awarded to the points classification winner	Points	Fabio Christen (SUI)	(Q36.5 Pro Cycling Team)
Jersey awarded to the mountains classification winner	Mountains	Fabio Christen (SUI)	(Q36.5 Pro Cycling Team)
Jersey awarded to the youth classification winner	Youth	Jakob Omrzel (SLO)	(Team Bahrain Victorious)
	Team	(Italy) VF Group–Bardiani–CSF–Faizanè	

The 2025 Tour of Slovenia (Slovene: Dirka po Sloveniji) was the 31st edition of the Tour of Slovenia stage race, held between 4 and 8 June 2025. The 2.Pro category race was part of the UCI ProSeries. The tour consisted of five stages. Anders Halland Johannessen (Uno-X Mobility) won overall, having led the general classification since Stage 4. The total prize money was €70,545.

== Teams ==
Four of the eighteen UCI WorldTeams, ten UCI ProTeams and five UCI Continental teams make up the nineteen teams that participated in the race. Originally Visma–Lease a Bike were also invited, but withdrew 3 days before the start of the race citing multiple injuries in their squad as the reason.

The best-positioned riders (according to the UCI ranking) were Dylan Groenewegen (Team Jayco–AlUla), Fabio Christen (Q36.5 Pro Cycling Team) and António Morgado (UAE Team Emirates XRG).

UCI WorldTeams

- Lidl–Trek
- Team Jayco–AlUla
- Team Bahrain Victorious
- UAE Team Emirates XRG

UCI ProTeams

- Burgos BH
- Caja Rural–Seguros RGA
- Equipo Kern Pharma
- Euskaltel–Euskadi
- Q36.5 Pro Cycling Team
- Team Polti VisitMalta
- Team Solution Tech–Vini Fantini
- Unibet Tietema Rockets
- Uno-X Mobility
- VF Group–Bardiani–CSF–Faizanè

UCI Continental Teams

- Adria Mobil
- Benotti Berthold
- Factor Racing
- Pierre Baguette Cycling
- Pogi Team Gusto Ljubljana

== Route ==
Stage characteristics and winners
Stage	Date	Course	Distance	Elevation gain	Type	Stage winner
1	4 June	Piran to Škofljica	168.7 km (104.8 mi)	1,838 m (6,030 ft)	Hilly stage	Dylan Groenewegen (NED)
2	5 June	Velenje to Rogaška Slatina	157.8 km (98.1 mi)	1,842 m (6,043 ft)	Hilly stage	Fabio Christen (SUI)
3	6 June	Majšperk to Ormož	173.4 km (107.7 mi)	1,382 m (4,534 ft)	Flat stage	Dylan Groenewegen (NED)
4	7 June	Maribor to Golte	175.2 km (108.9 mi)	3,014 m (9,888 ft)	Mountain stage	Kyrylo Tsarenko (UKR)
5	8 June	Litija to Novo Mesto	123.9 km (77.0 mi)	1,847 m (6,060 ft)	Hilly stage	Rui Oliveira (POR)
Total			804.4 km (499.8 mi)	12,401 m (40,686 ft)		

== Stages ==
=== Stage 1 ===
4 June 2025 — Piran to Škofljica, 168.7 km (104.8 mi)

Stage 1 Result
Rank	Rider	Team	Time
1	Dylan Groenewegen (NED)	Team Jayco–AlUla	3h 49' 21"
2	Phil Bauhaus (GER)	Team Bahrain Victorious	+ 0"
3	Manuel Peñalver (ESP)	Team Polti VisitMalta	+ 0"
4	Tim Torn Teutenberg (GER)	Lidl–Trek	+ 0"
5	Juan Sebastián Molano (COL)	UAE Team Emirates XRG	+ 0"
6	Luca Colnaghi (ITA)	VF Group–Bardiani–CSF–Faizanè	+ 0"
7	Tilen Finkšt (SLO)	Adria Mobil	+ 0"
8	Sakarias Koller Løland (NOR)	Uno-X Mobility	+ 0"
9	Žak Eržen (SLO)	Team Bahrain Victorious	+ 0"
10	Davide Bomboi (BEL)	Unibet Tietema Rockets	+ 0"

General classification after Stage 1
Rank	Rider	Team	Time
1	Dylan Groenewegen (NED)	Team Jayco–AlUla	3h 49' 11"
2	Fabio Christen (SUI)	Q36.5 Pro Cycling Team	+ 1"
3	Phil Bauhaus (GER)	Team Bahrain Victorious	+ 4"
4	Manuel Peñalver (ESP)	Team Polti VisitMalta	+ 6"
5	Matic Žumer (SLO)	Adria Mobil	+ 7"
6	António Morgado (POR)	UAE Team Emirates XRG	+ 8"
7	Fernando Barceló (ESP)	Caja Rural–Seguros RGA	+ 9"
8	Juan Sebastián Molano (COL)	UAE Team Emirates XRG	+ 10"
9	Luca Colnaghi (ITA)	VF Group–Bardiani–CSF–Faizanè	+ 10"
10	Tilen Finkšt (SLO)	Adria Mobil	+ 10"

=== Stage 2 ===
5 June 2025 — Velenje to Rogaška Slatina, 157.8 km (98.1 mi)

Stage 2 was an active race, with riders attacking in an effort to put sprint specialists under pressure and prevent a bunch sprint at the finish in Rogaška Slatina. The sprinters had form here; Dylan Groenewegen (Team Jayco–AlUla) had won in Rogaška Slatina three times previously (in 2018, 2022 and 2023), while Phil Bauhaus (Team Bahrain Victorious) had won in 2024. A group of seven riders escaped the peloton around 20 km from the finish and built a gap which grew to about one minute. In the final sprint, Rui Oliveira (UAE Team Emirates XRG) crossed the line first but was later relegated upon video review. He was deemed to have veered dangerously to the left, blocking Fabio Christen (Q36.5 Pro Cycling Team). Christen was subsequently awarded the stage win, with Anders Halland Johannessen (Uno-X Mobility) finishing second and Tao Geoghegan Hart (Lidl–Trek) third. Christen was also the first to reach the summit of the stage's only categorised climb, Celjska koča (7.8 km at 6.1%).

Stage 2 Result
Rank	Rider	Team	Time
1	Fabio Christen (SUI)	Q36.5 Pro Cycling Team	3h 44' 31"
2	Anders Halland Johannessen (NOR)	Uno-X Mobility	+ 0"
3	Tao Geoghegan Hart (GBR)	Lidl–Trek	+ 0"
4	Felix Großschartner (AUT)	UAE Team Emirates XRG	+ 0"
5	Jakob Omrzel (SLO)	Team Bahrain Victorious	+ 0"
6	Rui Oliveira (POR)	UAE Team Emirates XRG	+ 0"
7	Sjoerd Bax (NED)	Q36.5 Pro Cycling Team	+ 6"
8	Nicolò Parisini (ITA)	Q36.5 Pro Cycling Team	+ 53"
9	Sakarias Koller Løland (NOR)	Uno-X Mobility	+ 53"
10	Tim Torn Teutenberg (GER)	Lidl–Trek	+ 53"

General classification after Stage 2
Rank	Rider	Team	Time
1	Fabio Christen (SUI)	Q36.5 Pro Cycling Team	7h 33' 27"
2	Anders Halland Johannessen (NOR)	Uno-X Mobility	+ 16"
3	Tao Geoghegan Hart (GBR)	Lidl–Trek	+ 21"
4	Rui Oliveira (POR)	UAE Team Emirates XRG	+ 25"
5	Felix Großschartner (AUT)	UAE Team Emirates XRG	+ 25"
6	Jakob Omrzel (SLO)	Team Bahrain Victorious	+ 25"
7	Sjoerd Bax (NED)	Q36.5 Pro Cycling Team	+ 31"
8	Fernando Barceló (ESP)	Caja Rural–Seguros RGA	+ 1' 15"
9	António Morgado (POR)	UAE Team Emirates XRG	+ 1' 16"
10	Tim Torn Teutenberg (GER)	Lidl–Trek	+ 1' 18"

=== Stage 3 ===
6 June 2025 — Majšperk to Ormož, 173.4 km (107.7 mi)

Stage 3 Result
Rank	Rider	Team	Time
1	Dylan Groenewegen (NED)	Team Jayco–AlUla	3h 57' 48"
2	Juan Sebastián Molano (COL)	UAE Team Emirates XRG	+ 0"
3	Phil Bauhaus (GER)	Team Bahrain Victorious	+ 0"
4	Tim Torn Teutenberg (GER)	Lidl–Trek	+ 0"
5	Manuel Peñalver (ESP)	Team Polti VisitMalta	+ 0"
6	Tilen Finkšt (SLO)	Adria Mobil	+ 0"
7	Carl-Frederik Bévort (DEN)	Uno-X Mobility	+ 0"
8	Nicolò Parisini (ITA)	Q36.5 Pro Cycling Team	+ 0"
9	Fernando Barceló (ESP)	Caja Rural–Seguros RGA	+ 0"
10	Luca Colnaghi (ITA)	VF Group–Bardiani–CSF–Faizanè	+ 0"

General classification after Stage 3
Rank	Rider	Team	Time
1	Fabio Christen (SUI)	Q36.5 Pro Cycling Team	11h 31' 15"
2	Anders Halland Johannessen (NOR)	Uno-X Mobility	+ 16"
3	Tao Geoghegan Hart (GBR)	Lidl–Trek	+ 21"
4	Rui Oliveira (POR)	UAE Team Emirates XRG	+ 25"
5	Felix Großschartner (AUT)	UAE Team Emirates XRG	+ 25"
6	Jakob Omrzel (SLO)	Team Bahrain Victorious	+ 25"
7	Sjoerd Bax (NED)	Q36.5 Pro Cycling Team	+ 31"
8	Mikel Retegi (ESP)	Equipo Kern Pharma	+ 1' 10"
9	Fernando Barceló (ESP)	Caja Rural–Seguros RGA	+ 1' 15"
10	António Morgado (POR)	UAE Team Emirates XRG	+ 1' 16"

=== Stage 4 ===
7 June 2025 — Maribor to Golte, 175.2 km (108.9 mi)

Stage 4 was the Queen stage of the race, featuring the climb to Volovljek pass (category 2 climb; 5.3 km at 8.3%, with the summit at 1030 m) and an uphill finish to Golte (category 1 climb; 13.0 km at 7.5%, with the summit at 1412 m). Kyrylo Tsarenko (Team Solution Tech–Vini Fantini) won the stage, his first against strong UCI WorldTeam competition, having built a lead as part of an early breakaway.

Stage 4

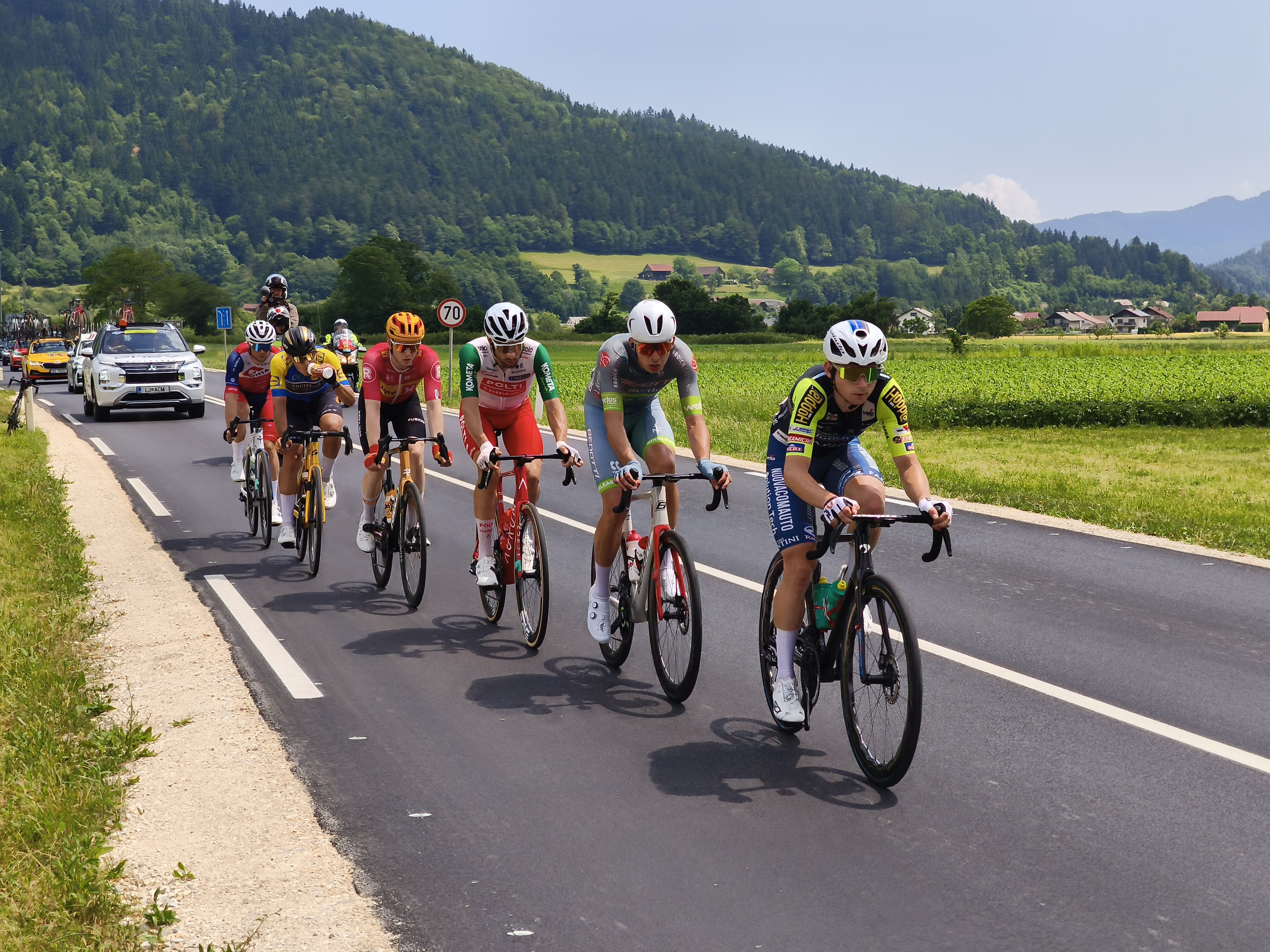
Breakaway group at Ljubno ob Savinji...

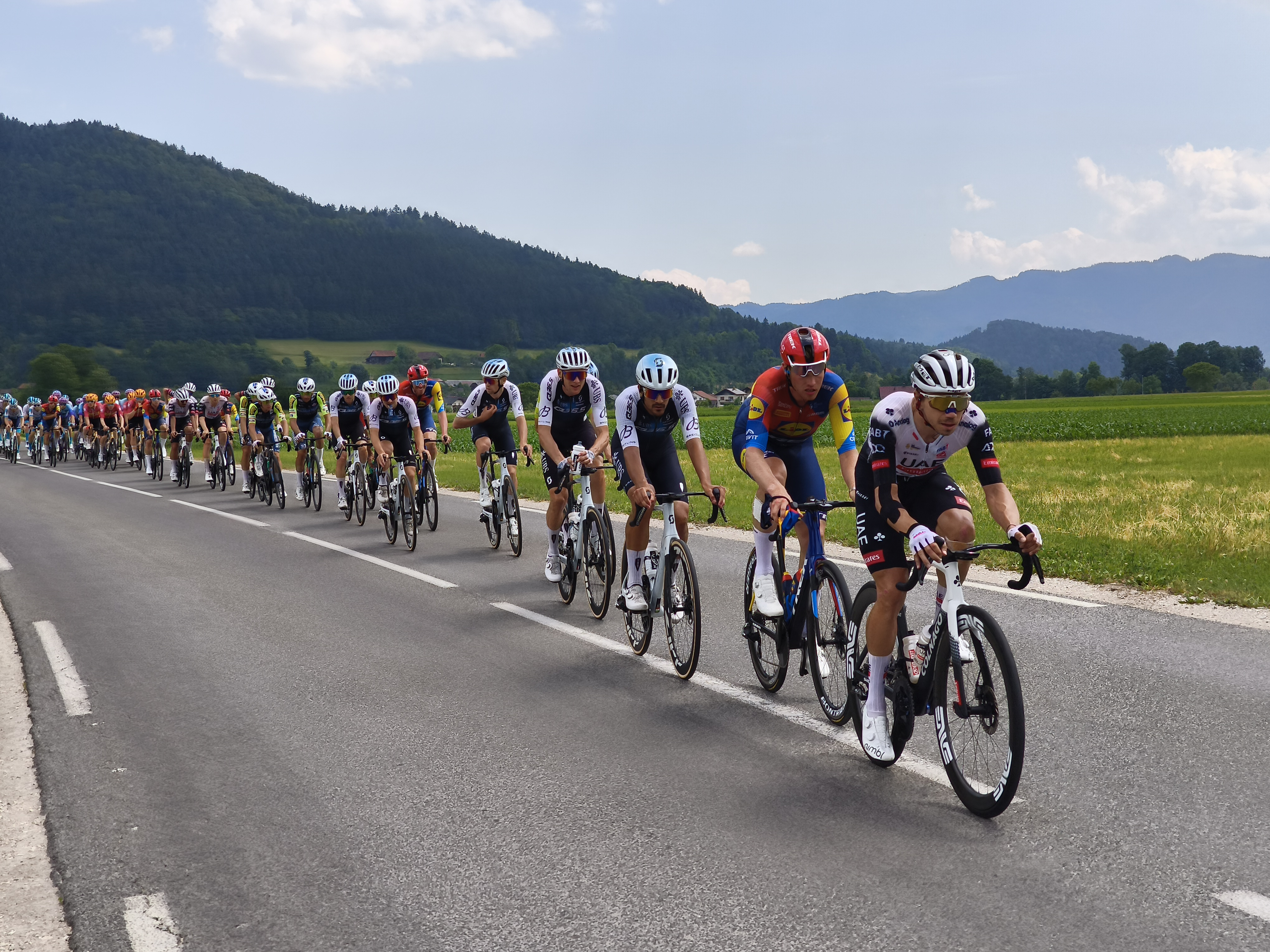
...followed by the peloton (time gap 5' 48") before the Volovljek Pass climb.

Stage 4 Result
Rank	Rider	Team	Time
1	Kyrylo Tsarenko (UKR)	Team Solution Tech–Vini Fantini	4h 37' 46"
2	Samuele Zoccarato (ITA)	Team Polti VisitMalta	+ 28"
3	Anders Halland Johannessen (NOR)	Uno-X Mobility	+ 38"
4	Felix Großschartner (AUT)	UAE Team Emirates XRG	+ 41"
5	Johannes Kulset (NOR)	Uno-X Mobility	+ 47"
6	Tao Geoghegan Hart (GBR)	Lidl–Trek	+ 48"
7	Jan Castellon (ESP)	Caja Rural–Seguros RGA	+ 52"
8	Jakob Omrzel (SLO)	Team Bahrain Victorious	+ 1' 00"
9	José Félix Parra (ESP)	Equipo Kern Pharma	+ 1' 02"
10	Fernando Barceló (ESP)	Caja Rural–Seguros RGA	+ 1' 02"

General classification after Stage 4
Rank	Rider	Team	Time
1	Anders Halland Johannessen (NOR)	Uno-X Mobility	16h 09' 51"
2	Felix Großschartner (AUT)	UAE Team Emirates XRG	+ 16"
3	Tao Geoghegan Hart (GBR)	Lidl–Trek	+ 19"
4	Jakob Omrzel (SLO)	Team Bahrain Victorious	+ 35"
5	Fabio Christen (SUI)	Q36.5 Pro Cycling Team	+ 50"
6	Johannes Kulset (NOR)	Uno-X Mobility	+ 1' 15"
7	Jan Castellon (ESP)	Caja Rural–Seguros RGA	+ 1' 20"
8	Fernando Barceló (ESP)	Caja Rural–Seguros RGA	+ 1' 27"
9	José Félix Parra (ESP)	Equipo Kern Pharma	+ 1' 30"
10	Alex Tolio (ITA)	VF Group–Bardiani–CSF–Faizanè	+ 1' 32"

=== Stage 5 ===
8 June 2025 — Litija to Novo Mesto, 123.9 km (77.0 mi)

Stage 5 was a short, hilly stage with a traditional finish in Novo Mesto. The stage featured five categorised climbs; two ascents of Vače (the first a category 2 climb, the second a shorter category 3) as well as Bogenšperk (cat. 3), Trebelno (cat. 3) and Trška Gora (cat. 3). On the final climb, general classification leader Anders Halland Johannessen (Uno-X Mobility) launched an attack on the peloton and moved up the road to finish with the front group. Ivo Oliveira (UAE Team Emirates XRG) won the stage in a reduced bunch sprint.

Stage 5 Result
Rank	Rider	Team	Time
1	Ivo Oliveira (POR)	UAE Team Emirates XRG	2h 56' 16"
2	Andrea Bagioli (ITA)	Lidl–Trek	+ 0"
3	Fernando Barceló (ESP)	Caja Rural–Seguros RGA	+ 0"
4	Fabio Christen (SUI)	Q36.5 Pro Cycling Team	+ 0"
5	Ludovico Crescioli (ITA)	Team Polti VisitMalta	+ 0"
6	Jelte Krijnsen (NED)	Team Jayco–AlUla	+ 0"
7	Jakob Omrzel (SLO)	Team Bahrain Victorious	+ 0"
8	Lorenzo Quartucci (ITA)	Team Solution Tech–Vini Fantini	+ 0"
9	Matteo Scalco (ITA)	VF Group–Bardiani–CSF–Faizanè	+ 0"
10	Eric Antonio Fagúndez (URU)	Burgos Burpellet BH	+ 0"

General classification after Stage 5
Rank	Rider	Team	Time
1	Anders Halland Johannessen (NOR)	Uno-X Mobility	19h 06' 07"
2	Felix Großschartner (AUT)	UAE Team Emirates XRG	+ 14"
3	Tao Geoghegan Hart (GBR)	Lidl–Trek	+ 19"
4	Jakob Omrzel (SLO)	Team Bahrain Victorious	+ 35"
5	Fabio Christen (SUI)	Q36.5 Pro Cycling Team	+ 50"
6	Johannes Kulset (NOR)	Uno-X Mobility	+ 1' 15"
7	Jan Castellon (ESP)	Caja Rural–Seguros RGA	+ 1' 20"
8	Fernando Barceló (ESP)	Caja Rural–Seguros RGA	+ 1' 23"
9	José Félix Parra (ESP)	Equipo Kern Pharma	+ 1' 24"
10	Alex Tolio (ITA)	VF Group–Bardiani–CSF–Faizanè	+ 1' 32"

== Classification leadership ==
Classification leadership by stage
Stage	Winner	General classification	Points classification	Mountains classification	Young rider classification	Team classification
1	Dylan Groenewegen	Dylan Groenewegen	Dylan Groenewegen	Fabio Christen	António Morgado	UAE Team Emirates XRG
2	Fabio Christen	Fabio Christen	Fabio Christen	Fabio Christen	Jakob Omrzel	UAE Team Emirates XRG
3	Dylan Groenewegen	Fabio Christen	Dylan Groenewegen	Fabio Christen	Jakob Omrzel	UAE Team Emirates XRG
4	Kyrylo Tsarenko	Anders Halland Johannessen	Dylan Groenewegen	Fabio Christen	Jakob Omrzel	Caja Rural–Seguros RGA
5	Ivo Oliveira	Anders Halland Johannessen	Dylan Groenewegen	Fabio Christen	Jakob Omrzel	VF Group–Bardiani–CSF–Faizanè
Final		Anders Halland Johannessen	Fabio Christen	Fabio Christen	Jakob Omrzel	VF Group–Bardiani–CSF–Faizanè

== Classification standings ==
Legend
Denotes the winner of the general classification	Denotes the winner of the points classification
Denotes the winner of the mountains classification	Denotes the winner of the young rider classification

=== General classification ===
Final general classification (1–10)
Rank	Rider	Team	Time
1	Anders Halland Johannessen (NOR)	Uno-X Mobility	19h 06' 07"
2	Felix Großschartner (AUT)	UAE Team Emirates XRG	+ 14"
3	Tao Geoghegan Hart (GBR)	Lidl–Trek	+ 19"
4	Jakob Omrzel (SLO)	Team Bahrain Victorious	+ 35"
5	Fabio Christen (SUI)	Q36.5 Pro Cycling Team	+ 50"
6	Johannes Kulset (NOR)	Uno-X Mobility	+ 1' 15"
7	Jan Castellon (ESP)	Caja Rural–Seguros RGA	+ 1' 20"
8	Fernando Barceló (ESP)	Caja Rural–Seguros RGA	+ 1' 23"
9	José Félix Parra (ESP)	Equipo Kern Pharma	+ 1' 24"
10	Alex Tolio (ITA)	VF Group–Bardiani–CSF–Faizanè	+ 1' 32"

=== Points classification ===
Final points classification (1–10)
Rank	Rider	Team	Points
1	Fabio Christen (SUI)	Q36.5 Pro Cycling Team	63
2	Dylan Groenewegen (NED)	Team Jayco–AlUla	50
3	Anders Halland Johannessen (NOR)	Uno-X Mobility	41
4	Phil Bauhaus (GER)	Team Bahrain Victorious	36
5	Tim Torn Teutenberg (GER)	Lidl–Trek	34
6	Felix Großschartner (AUT)	UAE Team Emirates XRG	33
7	Fernando Barceló (ESP)	Caja Rural–Seguros RGA	33
8	Ivo Oliveira (POR)	UAE Team Emirates XRG	29
9	Tao Geoghegan Hart (GBR)	Lidl–Trek	29
10	Jakob Omrzel (SLO)	Team Bahrain Victorious	29

=== Mountains classification ===
Final mountains classification (1–10)
Rank	Rider	Team	Points
1	Fabio Christen (SUI)	Q36.5 Pro Cycling Team	12
2	Mihael Štajnar (SLO)	Pogi Team Gusto Ljubljana	12
3	Samuele Zoccarato (ITA)	VF Group–Bardiani–CSF–Faizanè	12
4	Kyrylo Tsarenko (UKR)	Team Solution Tech–Vini Fantini	10
5	Juan Pedro López (ESP)	Lidl–Trek	10
6	Anders Halland Johannessen (NOR)	Uno-X Mobility	8
7	Matteo Badilatti (SUI)	Q36.5 Pro Cycling Team	6
8	Diego Uriarte (ESP)	Equipo Kern Pharma	5
9	Matteo Scalco (ITA)	VF Group–Bardiani–CSF–Faizanè	5
10	Márton Dina (HUN)	Euskaltel–Euskadi	4

=== Young rider classification ===
Final young rider classification (1–10)
Rank	Rider	Team	Time
1	Jakob Omrzel (SLO)	Team Bahrain Victorious	19h 06' 42"
2	Johannes Kulset (NOR)	Uno-X Mobility	+ 40"
3	Jan Castellon (ESP)	Caja Rural–Seguros RGA	+ 45"
4	Matteo Scalco (ITA)	VF Group–Bardiani–CSF–Faizanè	+ 1' 07"
5	Luca Paletti (ITA)	VF Group–Bardiani–CSF–Faizanè	+ 1' 50"
6	Roman Ermakov	Team Bahrain Victorious	+ 10' 24"
7	António Morgado (POR)	UAE Team Emirates XRG	+ 19' 01"
8	Samuel Fernández (ESP)	Caja Rural–Seguros RGA	+ 19' 03"
9	Sven Aleksander Mernik (SLO)	Factor Racing	+ 19' 16"
10	Vlad Van Mechelen (BEL)	Team Bahrain Victorious	+ 30' 02"

=== Team classification ===
Final team classification (1–10)
Rank	Team	Time
1	(Italy) VF Group–Bardiani–CSF–Faizanè	57h 24' 00"
2	(Spain) Caja Rural–Seguros RGA	+ 29"
3	(United States) Lidl–Trek	+ 57"
4	(Spain) Equipo Kern Pharma	+ 1' 34"
5	(Italy) Team Polti VisitMalta	+ 3' 20"
6	(Spain) Burgos Burpellet BH	+ 3' 24"
7	(Switzerland) Q36.5 Pro Cycling Team	+ 5' 33"
8	Team Bahrain Victorious	+ 8' 21"
9	(Spain) Euskaltel–Euskadi	+ 9' 37"
10	(Norway) Uno-X Mobility	+ 13' 35"
