= 2023 CRO Race =

2023 UCI Europe Tour

Race details
- Dates: 26 September–1 October 2023
- Stages: 6
- Distance: 966.5 km (600.6 mi)
- Winning time: 22h 59' 38"

Results
Jersey awarded to the overall winner	Winner	Orluis Aular (VEN)	(Caja Rural–Seguros RGA)
	Second	Alexander Kristoff (NOR)	(Uno-X Pro Cycling Team)
	Third	Ethan Hayter (GBR)	(Ineos Grenadiers)
Jersey awarded to the points classification winner	Points	Alexander Kristoff (NOR)	(Uno-X Pro Cycling Team)
Jersey awarded to the mountains classification winner	Mountains	Jonas Rapp (GER)	(Hrinkow Advarics)
Jersey awarded to the youth classification winner	Youth	Magnus Sheffield (USA)	(Ineos Grenadiers)
	Team	(Norway) Uno-X Pro Cycling Team	

The 2023 CRO Race was a road cycling stage race in Croatia between 26 September and 1 October 2023. It was the eighth edition of the Tour of Croatia since its revival in 2015 and the fourth under the CRO Race name. The race was rated as a category 2.1 event on the 2023 UCI Europe Tour calendar.

== Teams ==
Five of the 18 UCI WorldTeams, five UCI ProTeams and eight UCI Continental teams made up the 18 teams that participated in the race.

UCI WorldTeams

- Ineos Grenadiers
- Lidl–Trek
- Team Bahrain Victorious
- Team dsm–firmenich
- Team Jayco–AlUla

UCI ProTeams

- Caja Rural–Seguros RGA
- Eolo–Kometa
- Equipo Kern Pharma
- Q36.5 Pro Cycling Team
- Uno-X Pro Cycling Team

UCI Continental Teams

- Adria Mobil
- ATT Investments
- HRE Mazowsze Serce Polski
- Hrinkow Advarics
- Ljubljana Gusto Santic
- Maloja Pushbikers
- Santic–Wibatech
- Voster ATS Team

== Route ==
Stage characteristics and winners
Stage	Date	Course	Distance	Type	Winner
1	26 September	Primošten to Sinj	181 km (112 mi)	Hilly stage	Elia Viviani (ITA)
2	27 September	Biograd na Moru to Novalja	114.5 km (71.1 mi)	Flat stage	Iúri Leitão (POR)
3	28 September	Otočac to Opatija	133.5 km (83.0 mi)	Hilly stage	Nicolò Parisini (ITA)
4	29 September	Krk to Labin	191 km (119 mi)	Mountain stage	Matej Mohorič (SLO)
5	30 September	Crikvenica to Ozalj	189 km (117 mi)	Hilly stage	Orluis Aular (VEN)
6	1 October	Samobor to Zagreb	157.5 km (97.9 mi)	Flat stage	Campbell Stewart (NZL)
Total			966.5 km (600.6 mi)		

== Stages ==
=== Stage 1 ===
26 September 2023 – Primošten to Sinj, 181 km (112 mi)

Stage 1 Result
Rank	Rider	Team	Time
1	Elia Viviani (ITA)	Ineos Grenadiers	4h 38' 39"
2	Tobias Lund Andresen (DEN)	Team dsm–firmenich	+ 0"
3	Alexander Kristoff (NOR)	Uno-X Pro Cycling Team	+ 0"
4	Campbell Stewart (NZL)	Team Jayco–AlUla	+ 0"
5	Giovanni Lonardi (ITA)	Eolo–Kometa	+ 0"
6	Nicolò Buratti (ITA)	Team Bahrain Victorious	+ 0"
7	Nicolò Parisini (ITA)	Q36.5 Pro Cycling Team	+ 0"
8	Jiří Petruš (CZE)	ATT Investments	+ 0"
9	Matevž Govekar (SLO)	Team Bahrain Victorious	+ 0"
10	Fabian Steiniger (AUT)	Maloja Pushbikers	+ 0"

General classification after Stage 1
Rank	Rider	Team	Time
1	Elia Viviani (ITA)	Ineos Grenadiers	4h 38' 29"
2	Tobias Lund Andresen (DEN)	Team dsm–firmenich	+ 4"
3	Alexander Kristoff (NOR)	Uno-X Pro Cycling Team	+ 6"
4	Campbell Stewart (NZL)	Team Jayco–AlUla	+ 10"
5	Giovanni Lonardi (ITA)	Eolo–Kometa	+ 10"
6	Nicolò Buratti (ITA)	Team Bahrain Victorious	+ 10"
7	Nicolò Parisini (ITA)	Q36.5 Pro Cycling Team	+ 10"
8	Jiří Petruš (CZE)	ATT Investments	+ 10"
9	Matevž Govekar (SLO)	Team Bahrain Victorious	+ 10"
10	Fabian Steiniger (AUT)	Maloja Pushbikers	+ 10"

=== Stage 2 ===
27 September 2023 – Biograd na Moru to Novalja, 114.5 km (71.1 mi)

Stage 2 Result
Rank	Rider	Team	Time
1	Iúri Leitão (POR)	Caja Rural–Seguros RGA	2h 39' 16"
2	Elia Viviani (ITA)	Ineos Grenadiers	+ 0"
3	Alexander Kristoff (NOR)	Uno-X Pro Cycling Team	+ 0"
4	Tim Torn Teutenberg (GER)	Lidl–Trek	+ 0"
5	Giovanni Lonardi (ITA)	Eolo–Kometa	+ 0"
6	Tobias Lund Andresen (DEN)	Team dsm–firmenich	+ 0"
7	Matevž Govekar (SLO)	Team Bahrain Victorious	+ 0"
8	Filippo Fortin (ITA)	Maloja Pushbikers	+ 0"
9	Bartłomiej Proć (POL)	Santic–Wibatech	+ 0"
10	Orluis Aular (VEN)	Caja Rural–Seguros RGA	+ 0"

General classification after Stage 2
Rank	Rider	Team	Time
1	Elia Viviani (ITA)	Ineos Grenadiers	7h 17' 39"
2	Iúri Leitão (POR)	Caja Rural–Seguros RGA	+ 6"
3	Alexander Kristoff (NOR)	Uno-X Pro Cycling Team	+ 8"
4	Tobias Lund Andresen (DEN)	Team dsm–firmenich	+ 10"
5	Kristijan Koren (SLO)	Adria Mobil	+ 11"
6	Jonas Gregaard (DEN)	Uno-X Pro Cycling Team	+ 13"
7	Roger Adrià (ESP)	Equipo Kern Pharma	+ 14"
8	Ethan Hayter (GBR)	Ineos Grenadiers	+ 15"
9	Giovanni Lonardi (ITA)	Eolo–Kometa	+ 16"
10	Matevž Govekar (SLO)	Team Bahrain Victorious	+ 16"

=== Stage 3 ===
28 September 2023 – Otočac to Opatija, 133.5 km (83.0 mi)

Stage 3 Result
Rank	Rider	Team	Time
1	Nicolò Parisini (ITA)	Q36.5 Pro Cycling Team	3h 01' 35"
2	Tobias Lund Andresen (DEN)	Team dsm–firmenich	+ 0"
3	Matej Mohorič (SLO)	Team Bahrain Victorious	+ 0"
4	Pavel Bittner (CZE)	Team dsm–firmenich	+ 0"
5	Orluis Aular (VEN)	Caja Rural–Seguros RGA	+ 0"
6	Erik Fetter (HUN)	Eolo–Kometa	+ 0"
7	Nicolò Buratti (ITA)	Team Bahrain Victorious	+ 0"
8	Fernando Barceló (ESP)	Caja Rural–Seguros RGA	+ 0"
9	Magnus Sheffield (USA)	Ineos Grenadiers	+ 0"
10	Gal Glivar (SLO)	Adria Mobil	+ 0"

General classification after Stage 3
Rank	Rider	Team	Time
1	Tobias Lund Andresen (DEN)	Team dsm–firmenich	10h 19' 18"
2	Nicolò Parisini (ITA)	Q36.5 Pro Cycling Team	+ 2"
3	Alexander Kristoff (NOR)	Uno-X Pro Cycling Team	+ 4"
4	Orluis Aular (VEN)	Caja Rural–Seguros RGA	+ 9"
5	Jonas Gregaard (DEN)	Uno-X Pro Cycling Team	+ 9"
6	Magnus Sheffield (USA)	Ineos Grenadiers	+ 10"
7	Ethan Hayter (GBR)	Ineos Grenadiers	+ 11"
8	Campbell Stewart (NZL)	Team Jayco–AlUla	+ 12"
9	Nicolò Buratti (ITA)	Team Bahrain Victorious	+ 12"
10	Pavel Bittner (CZE)	Team dsm–firmenich	+ 12"

=== Stage 4 ===
29 September 2023 – Krk to Labin, 191 km (119 mi)

Stage 4 Result
Rank	Rider	Team	Time
1	Matej Mohorič (SLO)	Team Bahrain Victorious	4h 48' 19"
2	Magnus Sheffield (USA)	Ineos Grenadiers	+ 0"
3	Orluis Aular (VEN)	Caja Rural–Seguros RGA	+ 0"
4	Ethan Hayter (GBR)	Ineos Grenadiers	+ 0"
5	Roger Adrià (ESP)	Equipo Kern Pharma	+ 0"
6	Matthew Dinham (AUS)	Team dsm–firmenich	+ 0"
7	Erik Fetter (HUN)	Eolo–Kometa	+ 0"
8	Jakub Otruba (CZE)	ATT Investments	+ 0"
9	Urko Berrade (ESP)	Equipo Kern Pharma	+ 0"
10	Eddie Dunbar (IRL)	Team Jayco–AlUla	+ 0"

General classification after Stage 4
Rank	Rider	Team	Time
1	Magnus Sheffield (USA)	Ineos Grenadiers	15h 07' 41"
2	Orluis Aular (VEN)	Caja Rural–Seguros RGA	+ 1"
3	Ethan Hayter (GBR)	Ineos Grenadiers	+ 4"
4	Nicolò Parisini (ITA)	Q36.5 Pro Cycling Team	+ 5"
5	Matthew Dinham (AUS)	Team dsm–firmenich	+ 8"
6	Urko Berrade (ESP)	Equipo Kern Pharma	+ 8"
7	Erik Fetter (HUN)	Eolo–Kometa	+ 8"
8	Gal Glivar (SLO)	Adria Mobil	+ 8"
9	Eddie Dunbar (IRL)	Team Jayco–AlUla	+ 8"
10	Jakub Otruba (CZE)	ATT Investments	+ 8"

=== Stage 5 ===
30 September 2023 – Crikvenica to Ozalj, 189 km (117 mi)

Stage 5 Result
Rank	Rider	Team	Time
1	Orluis Aular (VEN)	Caja Rural–Seguros RGA	4h 34' 17"
2	Alexander Kristoff (NOR)	Uno-X Pro Cycling Team	+ 0"
3	Ethan Hayter (GBR)	Ineos Grenadiers	+ 0"
4	Elia Viviani (ITA)	Ineos Grenadiers	+ 0"
5	Tobias Lund Andresen (DEN)	Team dsm–firmenich	+ 0"
6	Giovanni Lonardi (ITA)	Eolo–Kometa	+ 0"
7	Campbell Stewart (NZL)	Team Jayco–AlUla	+ 0"
8	Tim Torn Teutenberg (GER)	Lidl–Trek	+ 0"
9	Nicolò Buratti (ITA)	Team Bahrain Victorious	+ 0"
10	Nicolò Parisini (ITA)	Q36.5 Pro Cycling Team	+ 0"

General classification after Stage 5
Rank	Rider	Team	Time
1	Orluis Aular (VEN)	Caja Rural–Seguros RGA	19h 41' 19"
2	Ethan Hayter (GBR)	Ineos Grenadiers	+ 9"
3	Magnus Sheffield (USA)	Ineos Grenadiers	+ 9"
4	Alexander Kristoff (NOR)	Uno-X Pro Cycling Team	+ 12"
5	Nicolò Parisini (ITA)	Q36.5 Pro Cycling Team	+ 14"
6	Matthew Dinham (AUS)	Team dsm–firmenich	+ 17"
7	Urko Berrade (ESP)	Equipo Kern Pharma	+ 17"
8	Erik Fetter (HUN)	Eolo–Kometa	+ 17"
9	Gal Glivar (SLO)	Adria Mobil	+ 17"
10	Jakub Otruba (CZE)	ATT Investments	+ 17"

=== Stage 6 ===
1 October 2023 – Samobor to Zagreb, 157.5 km (97.9 mi)

Stage 6 Result
Rank	Rider	Team	Time
1	Campbell Stewart (NZL)	Team Jayco–AlUla	3h 17' 49"
2	Alexander Kristoff (NOR)	Uno-X Pro Cycling Team	+ 0"
3	Gal Glivar (SLO)	Adria Mobil	+ 0"
4	Nicolò Parisini (ITA)	Q36.5 Pro Cycling Team	+ 0"
5	Tobias Lund Andresen (DEN)	Team dsm–firmenich	+ 0"
6	Matevž Govekar (SLO)	Team Bahrain Victorious	+ 0"
7	Giovanni Lonardi (ITA)	Eolo–Kometa	+ 0"
8	Tim Torn Teutenberg (GER)	Lidl–Trek	+ 0"
9	Nicolò Buratti (ITA)	Team Bahrain Victorious	+ 0"
10	Iúri Leitão (POR)	Caja Rural–Seguros RGA	+ 0"

General classification after Stage 6
Rank	Rider	Team	Time
1	Orluis Aular (VEN)	Caja Rural–Seguros RGA	22h 59' 38"
2	Alexander Kristoff (NOR)	Uno-X Pro Cycling Team	+ 3"
3	Ethan Hayter (GBR)	Ineos Grenadiers	+ 7"
4	Magnus Sheffield (USA)	Ineos Grenadiers	+ 9"
5	Gal Glivar (SLO)	Adria Mobil	+ 13"
6	Nicolò Parisini (ITA)	Q36.5 Pro Cycling Team	+ 14"
7	Urko Berrade (ESP)	Equipo Kern Pharma	+ 17"
8	Matthew Dinham (AUS)	Team dsm–firmenich	+ 17"
9	Erik Fetter (HUN)	Eolo–Kometa	+ 17"
10	Jakub Otruba (CZE)	ATT Investments	+ 17"

== Classification leadership table ==
In the 2023 CRO Race, four different jerseys were awarded. The general classification was calculated by adding each cyclist's finishing times on each stage, and applying time bonuses for the first three riders at intermediate sprints (three seconds to first, two seconds to second, and one second to third) and at the finish of mass-start stages; these were awarded to the first three finishers on all stages: the stage winner won a ten-second bonus, with six and four seconds for the second and third riders, respectively. The leader of the classification received a red jersey; it was considered the most important of the 2023 CRO Race, and the winner of the classification was considered the winner of the race.

Points for the mountains classification
Position	1	2	3	4	5	6	7	8
Points for Hors-category	20	15	10	8	6	4	3	2
Points for Category 1	12	8	6	4	2	0		
Points for Category 2	6	4	2	0				
Points for Category 3	3	2	1	0				

Additionally, there was a points classification, for which the leader was awarded a blue jersey. In the points classification, cyclists received points for finishing in the top 15 of each stage. For winning a stage, a rider earned 25 points, with 20 for second, 16 for third, 14 for fourth, 12 for fifth, 10 for sixth, and a point fewer per place down to 1 point for 15th place. Points towards the classification could also be won on a 5–3–1 scale for the first three riders, respectively, at intermediate sprint points during each stage; these intermediate sprints also offered bonus seconds towards the general classification as noted above.

There was also a mountains classification, the leadership of which was marked by a green jersey. In the mountains classification, points towards the classification were won by reaching the summit of a climb before other cyclists. Each climb was marked as either hors, first, second, or third-category, with more points available for the higher-categorized climbs.

The fourth and final jersey represented the young rider classification, and its leadership was marked by a white jersey. This was decided in the same way as the general classification, but only riders born after 1 January 2001 (i.e., under 23 years of age at the beginning of the year) were eligible to be ranked in the classification. There was also a team classification, in which the times of the best three cyclists per team on each stage were added together; the leading team at the end of the race was the team with the lowest total time.

Classification leadership by stage
Stage	Winner	General classification	Points classification	Mountains classification	Young rider classification	Team classification
1	Elia Viviani	Elia Viviani	Elia Viviani	Michal Schuran	Tobias Lund Andresen	Team dsm–firmenich
2	Iúri Leitão	Elia Viviani	Elia Viviani	Michal Schuran	Tobias Lund Andresen	Caja Rural–Seguros RGA
3	Nicolò Parisini	Tobias Lund Andresen	Tobias Lund Andresen	Marvin Hammerschmid	Tobias Lund Andresen	Team dsm–firmenich
4	Matej Mohorič	Magnus Sheffield	Tobias Lund Andresen	Jonas Abrahamsen	Magnus Sheffield	Uno-X Pro Cycling Team
5	Orluis Aular	Orluis Aular	Orluis Aular	Jonas Rapp	Magnus Sheffield	Uno-X Pro Cycling Team
6	Campbell Stewart	Orluis Aular	Alexander Kristoff	Jonas Rapp	Magnus Sheffield	Uno-X Pro Cycling Team
Final		Orluis Aular	Alexander Kristoff	Jonas Rapp	Magnus Sheffield	Uno-X Pro Cycling Team

- On stage 2, Alexander Kristoff, who was third in the points classification, wore the blue jersey, because first-placed Elia Viviani wore the red jersey as the leader of the general classification and second-placed, Tobias Lund Andresen, wore the white jersey as the leader of the youth rider classification.

== Classification standings ==
Legend
Denotes the winner of the general classification	Denotes the winner of the mountains classification
Denotes the winner of the points classification	Denotes the winner of the young rider classification

=== General classification ===
Final general classification (1–10)
Rank	Rider	Team	Time
1	Orluis Aular (VEN)	Caja Rural–Seguros RGA	22h 59' 38"
2	Alexander Kristoff (NOR)	Uno-X Pro Cycling Team	+ 3"
3	Ethan Hayter (GBR)	Ineos Grenadiers	+ 7"
4	Magnus Sheffield (USA)	Ineos Grenadiers	+ 9"
5	Gal Glivar (SLO)	Adria Mobil	+ 13"
6	Nicolò Parisini (ITA)	Q36.5 Pro Cycling Team	+ 14"
7	Urko Berrade (ESP)	Equipo Kern Pharma	+ 17"
8	Matthew Dinham (AUS)	Team dsm–firmenich	+ 17"
9	Erik Fetter (HUN)	Eolo–Kometa	+ 17"
10	Jakub Otruba (CZE)	ATT Investments	+ 17"

=== Points classification ===
Final points classification (1–10)
Rank	Rider	Team	Points
1	Alexander Kristoff (NOR)	Uno-X Pro Cycling Team	77
2	Tobias Lund Andresen (DEN)	Team dsm–firmenich	74
3	Orluis Aular (VEN)	Caja Rural–Seguros RGA	66
4	Elia Viviani (ITA)	Ineos Grenadiers	59
5	Nicolò Parisini (ITA)	Q36.5 Pro Cycling Team	57
6	Campbell Stewart (NZL)	Team Jayco–AlUla	55
7	Giovanni Lonardi (ITA)	Eolo–Kometa	43
8	Ethan Hayter (GBR)	Ineos Grenadiers	39
9	Matej Mohorič (SLO)	Team Bahrain Victorious	36
10	Magnus Sheffield (USA)	Ineos Grenadiers	34

=== Mountains classification ===
Final mountains classification (1–10)
Rank	Rider	Team	Time
1	Jonas Rapp (GER)	Hrinkow Advarics	35
2	Michal Schuran (CZE)	ATT Investments	33
3	Jonas Abrahamsen (NOR)	Uno-X Pro Cycling Team	28
4	Marvin Hammerschmid (AUT)	Hrinkow Advarics	12
5	Simone Bevilacqua (ITA)	Eolo–Kometa	11
6	Christopher Juul-Jensen (DEN)	Team Jayco–AlUla	11
7	Mirco Maestri (ITA)	Eolo–Kometa	10
8	Jan Kašpar (CZE)	ATT Investments	8
9	Andrea Pietrobon (ITA)	Eolo–Kometa	8
10	Fran Miholjević (CRO)	Team Bahrain Victorious	8

=== Young rider classification ===
Final young rider classification (1–10)
Rank	Rider	Team	Time
1	Magnus Sheffield (USA)	Ineos Grenadiers	22h 59' 47"
2	Gal Glivar (SLO)	Adria Mobil	+ 4"
3	Nicolò Buratti (ITA)	Team Bahrain Victorious	+ 27"
4	Fernando Tercero (ESP)	Eolo–Kometa	+ 33"
5	Igor Arrieta (ESP)	Equipo Kern Pharma	+ 1' 52"
6	Oscar Onley (GBR)	Team dsm–firmenich	+ 4' 56"
7	Fran Miholjević (CRO)	Team Bahrain Victorious	+ 6' 15"
8	Simon Dalby (DEN)	Uno-X Pro Cycling Team	+ 9' 48"
9	Joshua Tarling (GBR)	Ineos Grenadiers	+ 10' 31"
10	Nils Aebersold (SUI)	Lidl–Trek	+ 16' 29"

=== Team classification ===
Final team classification (1–10)
Rank	Team	Time
1	(Norway) Uno-X Pro Cycling Team	69h 00' 03"
2	(Netherlands) Team dsm–firmenich	+ 16"
3	Team Bahrain Victorious	+ 17"
4	(Australia) Team Jayco–AlUla	+ 24"
5	(Spain) Equipo Kern Pharma	+ 39"
6	(Italy) Eolo–Kometa	+ 55"
7	(Spain) Caja Rural–Seguros RGA	+ 1' 03"
8	(United Kingdom) Ineos Grenadiers	+ 3' 15"
9	(Switzerland) Q36.5 Pro Cycling Team	+ 4' 12"
10	(Austria) Hrinkow Advarics	+ 10' 48"
