= 2022 CRO Race =

2022 UCI Europe Tour

Race details
- Dates: 27 September–2 October 2022
- Stages: 6
- Distance: 1,074.5 km (667.7 mi)
- Winning time: 24h 54' 05"

Results
Jersey awarded to the overall winner	Winner	Matej Mohorič (SLO)	(Team Bahrain Victorious)
	Second	Jonas Vingegaard (DEN)	(Team Jumbo–Visma)
	Third	Oscar Onley (GBR)	(Team DSM)
Jersey awarded to the points classification winner	Points	Jonathan Milan (ITA)	(Team Bahrain Victorious)
Jersey awarded to the mountains classification winner	Mountains	Alexis Guérin (FRA)	(Team Vorarlberg)
Jersey awarded to the young rider classification winner	Young rider	Oscar Onley (GBR)	(Team DSM)
	Team	(United Kingdom) INEOS Grenadiers	

The 2022 CRO Race was a road cycling stage race in Croatia between 27 September and 2 October 2022. It was the seventh edition of the Tour of Croatia since its revival in 2015 and the third under the CRO Race name. The race is rated as a category 2.1 event on the 2022 UCI Europe Tour calendar.

== Teams ==
Six of the 18 UCI WorldTeams, eight UCI ProTeams and six UCI Continental teams made up the 20 teams that will participated in the race.

UCI WorldTeams

- Team Bahrain Victorious
- INEOS Grenadiers
- Israel–Premier Tech
- Team Jumbo–Visma
- Team DSM
- Trek–Segafredo

UCI ProTeams

- Bardiani–CSF–Faizanè
- Bingoal Pauwels Sauces WB
- B&B Hotels–KTM
- Caja Rural–Seguros RGA
- Eolo–Kometa
- Equipo Kern Pharma
- Human Powered Health
- Uno-X Pro Cycling Team

UCI Continental Teams

- Adria Mobil
- HRE Mazowsze Serce Polski
- Hrinkow Advarics
- Ljubljana Gusto Santic
- Meridiana–Kamen
- Team Vorarlberg

== Route ==
Stage characteristics and winners
Stage	Date	Course	Distance	Type	Winner
1	27 September	Osijek to Ludbreg	223.5 km (138.9 mi)	Flat stage	Jonathan Milan (ITA)
2	28 September	Otočac to Zadar	163.0 km (101.3 mi)	Hilly stage	Jonathan Milan (ITA)
3	29 September	Sinj to Primošten	157.0 km (97.6 mi)	Hilly stage	Jonas Vingegaard (DEN)
4	30 September	Biograd na Moru to Crikvenica	219.0 km (136.1 mi)	Hilly stage	Axel Laurance (FRA)
5	1 October	Opatija to Labin	154.0 km (95.7 mi)	Mountain stage	Jonas Vingegaard (DEN)
6	2 October	Sveta Nedelja to Zagreb	158.0 km (98.2 mi)	Flat stage	Elia Viviani (ITA)
Total			1,074.5 km (667.7 mi)		

== Stages ==
=== Stage 1 ===
27 September 2022 – Osijek to Ludbreg, 223.5 km (138.9 mi)

Stage 1 Result (1–10)
Rank	Rider	Team	Time
1	Jonathan Milan (ITA)	Team Bahrain Victorious	5h 31' 48"
2	Sacha Modolo (ITA)	Bardiani–CSF–Faizanè	+ 0"
3	Mirco Maestri (ITA)	Eolo–Kometa	+ 0"
4	Kim Heiduk (GER)	INEOS Grenadiers	+ 0"
5	Gal Glivar (SLO)	Adria Mobil	+ 0"
6	Sergio Martín (ESP)	Caja Rural–Seguros RGA	+ 0"
7	Matej Mohorič (SLO)	Team Bahrain Victorious	+ 0"
8	Kiko Galván (ESP)	Equipo Kern Pharma	+ 0"
9	Jacopo Mosca (ITA)	Trek–Segafredo	+ 0"
10	Chris Hamilton (AUS)	Team DSM	+ 0"

General classification after Stage 1 (1–10)
Rank	Rider	Team	Time
1	Jonathan Milan (ITA)	Team Bahrain Victorious	5h 31' 38"
2	Sacha Modolo (ITA)	Bardiani–CSF–Faizanè	+ 4"
3	Kenny Molly (BEL)	Bingoal Pauwels Sauces WB	+ 4"
4	Mirco Maestri (ITA)	Eolo–Kometa	+ 6"
5	Kim Heiduk (GER)	INEOS Grenadiers	+ 10"
6	Gal Glivar (SLO)	Adria Mobil	+ 10"
7	Sergio Martín (ESP)	Caja Rural–Seguros RGA	+ 10"
8	Matej Mohorič (SLO)	Team Bahrain Victorious	+ 10"
9	Kiko Galván (ESP)	Equipo Kern Pharma	+ 10"
10	Jacopo Mosca (ITA)	Trek–Segafredo	+ 10"

=== Stage 2 ===
28 September 2022 – Otočac to Zadar, 163 km (101 mi)

Stage 2 Result (1–10)
Rank	Rider	Team	Time
1	Jonathan Milan (ITA)	Team Bahrain Victorious	3h 44' 44"
2	Pierre Barbier (FRA)	B&B Hotels–KTM	+ 0"
3	Elia Viviani (ITA)	INEOS Grenadiers	+ 0"
4	Axel Laurance (FRA)	B&B Hotels–KTM	+ 0"
5	Jon Aberasturi (ESP)	Trek–Segafredo	+ 0"
6	Nils Eekhoff (NED)	Team DSM	+ 0"
7	Arvid de Kleijn (NED)	Human Powered Health	+ 0"
8	Attilio Viviani (ITA)	Bingoal Pauwels Sauces WB	+ 0"
9	Vincenzo Albanese (ITA)	Eolo–Kometa	+ 0"
10	Milan Menten (BEL)	Bingoal Pauwels Sauces WB	+ 0"

General classification after Stage 2 (1–10)
Rank	Rider	Team	Time
1	Jonathan Milan (ITA)	Team Bahrain Victorious	9h 16' 12"
2	Pierre Barbier (FRA)	B&B Hotels–KTM	+ 14"
3	Sacha Modolo (ITA)	Bardiani–CSF–Faizanè	+ 14"
4	Kenny Molly (BEL)	Bingoal Pauwels Sauces WB	+ 14"
5	Elia Viviani (ITA)	INEOS Grenadiers	+ 16"
6	Jacopo Mosca (ITA)	Trek–Segafredo	+ 17"
7	Álex Jaime (ESP)	Equipo Kern Pharma	+ 18"
8	Victor Koretzky (FRA)	B&B Hotels–KTM	+ 19"
9	Kiko Galván (ESP)	Equipo Kern Pharma	+ 20"
10	Sergio Martín (ESP)	Caja Rural–Seguros RGA	+ 20"

=== Stage 3 ===
29 September 2022 – Sinj to Primošten, 157 km (98 mi)

Stage 3 Result (1–10)
Rank	Rider	Team	Time
1	Jonas Vingegaard (DEN)	Team Jumbo–Visma	3h 31' 28"
2	Oscar Onley (GBR)	Team DSM	+ 0"
3	Matej Mohorič (SLO)	Team Bahrain Victorious	+ 2"
4	Vincenzo Albanese (ITA)	Eolo–Kometa	+ 5"
5	Jonathan Milan (ITA)	Team Bahrain Victorious	+ 9"
6	Axel Laurance (FRA)	B&B Hotels–KTM	+ 9"
7	Santiago Buitrago (COL)	Team Bahrain Victorious	+ 9"
8	Jonas Gregaard (DEN)	Uno-X Pro Cycling Team	+ 9"
9	Brandon Rivera (COL)	INEOS Grenadiers	+ 9"
10	Mathijs Paasschens (NED)	Bingoal Pauwels Sauces WB	+ 9"

General classification after Stage 3 (1–10)
Rank	Rider	Team	Time
1	Jonathan Milan (ITA)	Team Bahrain Victorious	12h 47' 49"
2	Jonas Vingegaard (DEN)	Team Jumbo–Visma	+ 1"
3	Oscar Onley (GBR)	Team DSM	+ 5"
4	Matej Mohorič (SLO)	Team Bahrain Victorious	+ 9"
5	Vincenzo Albanese (ITA)	Eolo–Kometa	+ 16"
6	Brandon Rivera (COL)	INEOS Grenadiers	+ 20"
7	Axel Laurance (FRA)	B&B Hotels–KTM	+ 20"
8	Jonas Gregaard (DEN)	Uno-X Pro Cycling Team	+ 20"
9	Santiago Buitrago (COL)	Team Bahrain Victorious	+ 20"
10	Chris Hamilton (AUS)	Team DSM	+ 23"

=== Stage 4 ===
30 September 2022 – Biograd na Moru to Crikvenica, 219 km (136 mi)

Stage 4 Result (1–10)
Rank	Rider	Team	Time
1	Axel Laurance (FRA)	B&B Hotels–KTM	5h 04' 31"
2	Jonathan Milan (ITA)	Team Bahrain Victorious	+ 0"
3	Matej Mohorič (SLO)	Team Bahrain Victorious	+ 0"
4	Brandon Rivera (COL)	INEOS Grenadiers	+ 0"
5	Álex Jaime (ESP)	Equipo Kern Pharma	+ 0"
6	Laurenz Rex (BEL)	Bingoal Pauwels Sauces WB	+ 0"
7	Jon Aberasturi (ESP)	Trek–Segafredo	+ 0"
8	Marc Brustenga (ESP)	Trek–Segafredo	+ 0"
9	Kiko Galván (ESP)	Equipo Kern Pharma	+ 0"
10	Sacha Modolo (ITA)	Bardiani–CSF–Faizanè	+ 0"

General classification after Stage 4 (1–10)
Rank	Rider	Team	Time
1	Jonathan Milan (ITA)	Team Bahrain Victorious	17h 52' 11"
2	Jonas Vingegaard (DEN)	Team Jumbo–Visma	+ 10"
3	Matej Mohorič (SLO)	Team Bahrain Victorious	+ 14"
4	Oscar Onley (GBR)	Team DSM	+ 14"
5	Axel Laurance (FRA)	B&B Hotels–KTM	+ 19"
6	Vincenzo Albanese (ITA)	Eolo–Kometa	+ 24"
7	Brandon Rivera (COL)	INEOS Grenadiers	+ 29"
8	Jonas Gregaard (DEN)	Uno-X Pro Cycling Team	+ 29"
9	Santiago Buitrago (COL)	Team Bahrain Victorious	+ 29"
10	Chris Hamilton (AUS)	Team DSM	+ 33"

=== Stage 5 ===
1 October 2022 – Opatija to Labin, 154 km (96 mi)

Stage 5 Result (1–10)
Rank	Rider	Team	Time
1	Jonas Vingegaard (DEN)	Team Jumbo–Visma	3h 46' 04"
2	Oscar Onley (GBR)	Team DSM	+ 0"
3	Matej Mohorič (SLO)	Team Bahrain Victorious	+ 2"
4	Vincenzo Albanese (ITA)	Eolo–Kometa	+ 3"
5	Brandon Rivera (COL)	INEOS Grenadiers	+ 3"
6	Torstein Træen (NOR)	Uno-X Pro Cycling Team	+ 6"
7	Axel Laurance (FRA)	B&B Hotels–KTM	+ 6"
8	Pierre Rolland (FRA)	B&B Hotels–KTM	+ 8"
9	Santiago Buitrago (COL)	Team Bahrain Victorious	+ 14"
10	Jonathan Lastra (ESP)	Caja Rural–Seguros RGA	+ 14"

General classification after Stage 5 (1–10)
Rank	Rider	Team	Time
1	Jonas Vingegaard (DEN)	Team Jumbo–Visma	21h 38' 15"
2	Matej Mohorič (SLO)	Team Bahrain Victorious	+ 8"
3	Oscar Onley (GBR)	Team DSM	+ 8"
4	Vincenzo Albanese (ITA)	Eolo–Kometa	+ 24"
5	Axel Laurance (FRA)	B&B Hotels–KTM	+ 25"
6	Brandon Rivera (COL)	INEOS Grenadiers	+ 30"
7	Torstein Træen (NOR)	Uno-X Pro Cycling Team	+ 38"
8	Santiago Buitrago (COL)	Team Bahrain Victorious	+ 43"
9	Jonathan Lastra (ESP)	Caja Rural–Seguros RGA	+ 46"
10	Chris Hamilton (AUS)	Team DSM	+ 59"

=== Stage 6 ===
2 October 2022 – Sveta Nedelja to Zagreb, 158 km (98 mi)

Stage 6 Result (1–10)
Rank	Rider	Team	Time
1	Elia Viviani (ITA)	INEOS Grenadiers	3h 15' 51"
2	Matej Mohorič (SLO)	Team Bahrain Victorious	+ 0"
3	Vincenzo Albanese (ITA)	Eolo–Kometa	+ 0"
4	Laurenz Rex (BEL)	Bingoal Pauwels Sauces WB	+ 0"
5	Sacha Modolo (ITA)	Bardiani–CSF–Faizanè	+ 0"
6	Jonathan Milan (ITA)	Team Bahrain Victorious	+ 0"
7	Kenny Molly (BEL)	Bingoal Pauwels Sauces WB	+ 0"
8	Kim Heiduk (GER)	INEOS Grenadiers	+ 0"
9	Brandon Rivera (COL)	INEOS Grenadiers	+ 0"
10	Marc Brustenga (ESP)	Trek–Segafredo	+ 0"

General classification after Stage 6 (1–10)
Rank	Rider	Team	Time
1	Matej Mohorič (SLO)	Team Bahrain Victorious	24h 54' 05"
2	Jonas Vingegaard (DEN)	Team Jumbo–Visma	+ 1"
3	Oscar Onley (GBR)	Team DSM	+ 11"
4	Vincenzo Albanese (ITA)	Eolo–Kometa	+ 21"
5	Axel Laurance (FRA)	B&B Hotels–KTM	+ 26"
6	Brandon Rivera (COL)	INEOS Grenadiers	+ 31"
7	Torstein Træen (NOR)	Uno-X Pro Cycling Team	+ 39"
8	Jonathan Lastra (ESP)	Caja Rural–Seguros RGA	+ 47"
9	Chris Hamilton (AUS)	Team DSM	+ 1' 11"
10	Omar Fraile (ESP)	INEOS Grenadiers	+ 1' 43"

== Classification leadership table ==
In the 2022 CRO Race, four different jerseys were awarded. The general classification was calculated by adding each cyclist's finishing times on each stage, and applying time bonuses for the first three riders at intermediate sprints (three seconds to first, two seconds to second, and one second to third) and at the finish of mass-start stages; these were awarded to the first three finishers on all stages: the stage winner won a ten-second bonus, with six and four seconds for the second and third riders, respectively. The leader of the classification received a red jersey; it was considered the most important of the 2022 CRO Race, and the winner of the classification was considered the winner of the race.

Points for the mountains classification
Position	1	2	3	4	5	6	7	8
Points for Hors-category	20	15	10	8	6	4	3	2
Points for Category 1	12	8	6	4	2	0		
Points for Category 2	6	4	2	0				
Points for Category 3	3	2	1	0				

Additionally, there was a points classification, for which the leader was awarded a blue jersey. In the points classification, cyclists received points for finishing in the top 15 of each stage. For winning a stage, a rider earned 25 points, with 20 for second, 16 for third, 14 for fourth, 12 for fifth, 10 for sixth, and a point fewer per place down to 1 point for 15th place. Points towards the classification could also be won on a 5–3–1 scale for the first three riders, respectively, at intermediate sprint points during each stage; these intermediate sprints also offered bonus seconds towards the general classification as noted above.

There was also a mountains classification, the leadership of which was marked by a green jersey. In the mountains classification, points towards the classification were won by reaching the summit of a climb before other cyclists. Each climb was marked as either hors, first, second, or third-category, with more points available for the higher-categorized climbs.

The fourth and final jersey represented the young rider classification, and its leadership was marked by a white jersey. This was decided in the same way as the general classification, but only riders born after 1 January 2000 (i.e., under 23 years of age at the beginning of the year) were eligible to be ranked in the classification. There was also a team classification, in which the times of the best three cyclists per team on each stage were added together; the leading team at the end of the race was the team with the lowest total time.

Classification leadership by stage
Stage	Winner	General classification	Points classification	Mountains classification	Young rider classification	Team classification
1	Jonathan Milan	Jonathan Milan	Jonathan Milan	Oscar Onley	Jonathan Milan	Team Bahrain Victorious
2	Jonathan Milan	Jonathan Milan	Jonathan Milan	Tobiasz Pawlak	Jonathan Milan	Team Bahrain Victorious
3	Jonas Vingegaard	Jonathan Milan	Jonathan Milan	Oscar Onley	Jonathan Milan	Team Bahrain Victorious
4	Axel Laurence	Jonathan Milan	Jonathan Milan	Alexis Guérin	Jonathan Milan	Team Bahrain Victorious
5	Jonas Vingegaard	Jonas Vingegaard	Jonathan Milan	Alexis Guérin	Oscar Onley	INEOS Grenadiers
6	Elia Viviani	Matej Mohorič	Jonathan Milan	Alexis Guérin	Oscar Onley	INEOS Grenadiers
Final		Matej Mohorič	Jonathan Milan	Alexis Guérin	Oscar Onley	INEOS Grenadiers

- On stage 2, Sacha Modolo, who was second in the points classification, wore the blue jersey, because first-placed Jonathan Milan wore the red jersey as the leader of the general classification. For the same reason Kim Heiduk who was second in the young rider classification, wore the white jersey.
- On stage 3, Pierre Barbier, who was second in the points classification, wore the blue jersey, because first-placed Jonathan Milan wore the red jersey as the leader of the general classification. For the same reason Axel Laurance who was second in the young rider classification, wore the white jersey.
- On stage 4, Jonas Vingegaard, who was second in the points classification, wore the blue jersey, because first-placed Jonathan Milan wore the red jersey as the leader of the general classification. For the same reason Axel Laurance who was second in the young rider classification, wore the white jersey.
- On stage 5, Axel Laurance, who was second in the points classification, wore the blue jersey, because first-placed Jonathan Milan wore the red jersey as the leader of the general classification. For the same reason Oscar Onley who was second in the young rider classification, wore the white jersey.

== Final classification standings ==
Legend
Denotes the winner of the general classification	Denotes the winner of the mountains classification
Denotes the winner of the points classification	Denotes the winner of the young rider classification

=== General classification ===
Final general classification (1–10)
Rank	Rider	Team	Time
1	Matej Mohorič (SLO)	Team Bahrain Victorious	24h 54' 05"
2	Jonas Vingegaard (DEN)	Team Jumbo–Visma	+ 1"
3	Oscar Onley (GBR)	Team DSM	+ 11"
4	Vincenzo Albanese (ITA)	Eolo–Kometa	+ 21"
5	Axel Laurance (FRA)	B&B Hotels–KTM	+ 26"
6	Brandon Rivera (COL)	INEOS Grenadiers	+ 31"
7	Torstein Træen (NOR)	Uno-X Pro Cycling Team	+ 39"
8	Jonathan Lastra (ESP)	Caja Rural–Seguros RGA	+ 47"
9	Chris Hamilton (AUS)	Team DSM	+ 1' 11"
10	Omar Fraile (ESP)	INEOS Grenadiers	+ 1' 43"

=== Points classification ===
Final points classification (1–10)
Rank	Rider	Team	Points
1	Jonathan Milan (ITA)	Team Bahrain Victorious	98
2	Matej Mohorič (SLO)	Team Bahrain Victorious	88
3	Axel Laurance (FRA)	B&B Hotels–KTM	58
4	Vincenzo Albanese (ITA)	Eolo–Kometa	57
5	Jonas Vingegaard (DEN)	Team Jumbo–Visma	52
6	Oscar Onley (GBR)	Team DSM	46
7	Brandon Rivera (COL)	INEOS Grenadiers	43
8	Elia Viviani (ITA)	INEOS Grenadiers	41
9	Sacha Modolo (ITA)	Bardiani–CSF–Faizanè	38
10	Jacopo Mosca (ITA)	Trek–Segafredo	30

=== Mountains classification ===
Final mountains classification (1–10)
Rank	Rider	Team	Points
1	Alexis Guérin (FRA)	Team Vorarlberg	51
2	Oscar Onley (GBR)	Team DSM	26
3	Jonas Vingegaard (DEN)	Team Jumbo–Visma	22
4	Gijs Leemreize (NED)	Team Jumbo–Visma	17
5	Pierre Rolland (FRA)	B&B Hotels–KTM	12
6	Max Poole (GBR)	Team DSM	11
7	Tobiasz Pawlak (POL)	HRE Mazowsze Serce Polski	9
8	Omar Fraile (ESP)	INEOS Grenadiers	6
9	Jacopo Mosca (ITA)	Trek–Segafredo	5
10	Matej Mohorič (SLO)	Team Bahrain Victorious	4

=== Young rider classification ===
Final young rider classification (1–10)
Rank	Rider	Team	Time
1	Oscar Onley (GBR)	Team DSM	24h 54' 16"
2	Axel Laurance (FRA)	B&B Hotels–KTM	+ 15"
3	Jonathan Milan (ITA)	Team Bahrain Victorious	+ 10' 12"
4	Kim Heiduk (GER)	INEOS Grenadiers	+ 13' 55"
5	Gal Glivar (SLO)	Adria Mobil	+ 14' 31"
6	Max Poole (GBR)	Team DSM	+ 15' 25"
7	Álex Martín (ESP)	Eolo–Kometa	+ 19' 19"
8	Alessandro Fancellu (ITA)	Eolo–Kometa	+ 23' 46"
9	Fran Miholjević (CRO)	Equipo Kern Pharma	+ 25' 33"
10	Dylan Hopkins (AUS)	Ljubljana Gusto Santic	+ 32' 12"

=== Team classification ===
Final team classification (1–10)
Rank	Team	Time
1	INEOS Grenadiers	74h 48' 19"
2	Team Bahrain Victorious	+ 6' 13"
3	Caja Rural–Seguros RGA	+ 7' 44"
4	B&B Hotels–KTM	+ 8' 11"
5	Team DSM	+ 10' 08"
6	Uno-X Pro Cycling Team	+ 15' 53"
7	Eolo–Kometa	+ 16' 23"
8	Team Jumbo–Visma	+ 17' 27"
9	Team Vorarlberg	+ 32' 32"
10	Bingoal Pauwels Sauces WB	+ 34' 00"
