= Anders Halland Johannessen =

Norwegian cyclist (born 1999)

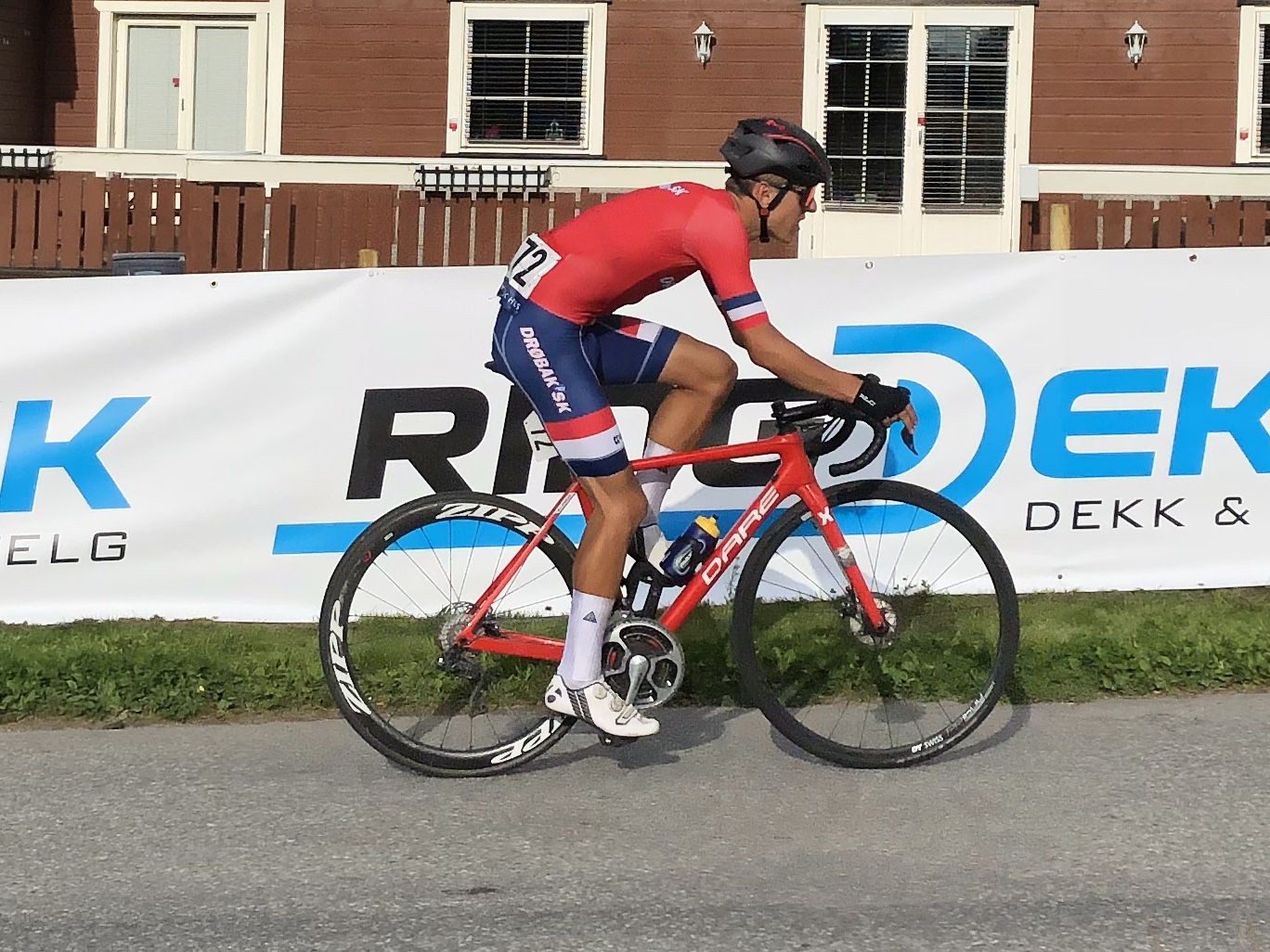

Personal information
- Born: 23 August 1999 (age 27) Drøbak, Norway

Cycling career
- Sport: Cycling
- Current team: Uno-X Mobility
- Disciplines: Road; Cyclo-cross; Mountain biking
- Role: Rider

Amateur team
- 2019–2020: Dare Bikes Development

Professional teams
- 2021: Uno-X Dare Development Team
- 2022–: Uno-X Pro Cycling Team

Major wins
- Stage races Tour of Slovenia (2025)

Anders Halland Johannessen (born 23 August 1999) is a Norwegian road cyclist, who currently rides for UCI WorldTeam Uno-X Mobility.

Along with his twin brother Tobias, Anders has raced in mountain biking, cyclo-cross and road cycling, before focusing primarily on road racing.

== Major results ==
=== Road ===
2020
2nd Road race, National Under–23 Championships
10th Gylne Gutuer
2021
7th Overall Tour de l'Avenir

1st Stage 6

8th Overall Giro Ciclistico d'Italia
9th Overall Tour of Turkey
10th Overall Alpes Isère Tour
2022
6th Overall Tour of Turkey
2023
5th Overall Sibiu Cycling Tour
2025 (1 pro win)
1st Overall Tour of Slovenia
2nd Road race, National Championships
2nd Overall Tour de Langkawi
6th Milano–Torino
6th Maryland Cycling Classic

=== Grand Tour general classification results timeline ===
Grand Tour	2025	2026
Giro d'Italia	—	—
Tour de France	76	64
Vuelta a España	—	

Legend
—	Did not compete
DNF	Did not finish

=== Cyclo-cross ===
2018–2019
2nd National Championships
