= Fabio Christen =

Swiss cyclist (born 2002)

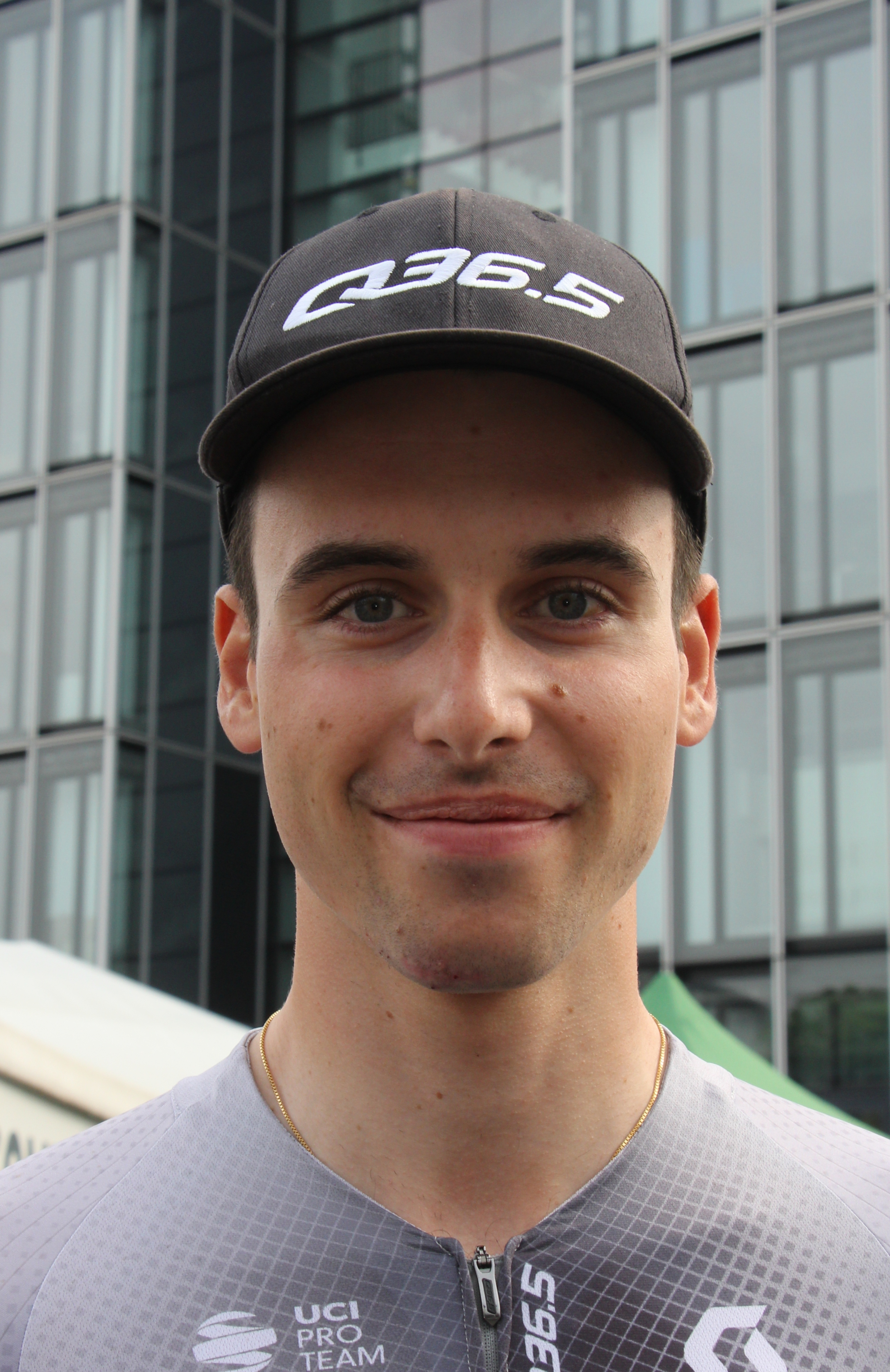
- Christen in 2023

Personal information
- Born: 29 June 2002 (age 24)
- Height: 1.84 m (6 ft 0 in)

Cycling career
- Sport: Cycling
- Current team: Pinarello–Q36.5 Pro Cycling Team
- Discipline: Road
- Role: Rider

Professional teams
- 2021–2022: Nippo–Provence–PTS Conti
- 2023–: Q36.5 Pro Cycling Team

Fabio Christen (born 29 June 2002) is a Swiss racing cyclist, who currently rides for UCI ProTeam Pinarello–Q36.5 Pro Cycling Team. His younger brother Jan Christen is also a professional cyclist.

Christen took the first professional victory of his career at the 2025 Vuelta a Murcia, a one-day race in Murcia, Spain. He sprinted to the front with 200m to go and held off Aurélien Paret-Peintre and Christian Scaroni to take the win.

== Major results ==
2019
1st Time trial, National Junior Road Championships
2020
National Junior Road Championships

1st Time trial
2nd Road race

7th Overall Grand Prix Rüebliland
2021
3rd Road race, National Under-23 Road Championships
2022
2nd Team relay, UEC European Under-23 Road Championships
National Under-23 Road Championships

3rd Time trial
4th Road race

4th Overall Istrian Spring Trophy
5th Overall Tour du Pays de Montbéliard
6th Grand Prix Velo Alanya
2023
1st Stage 4 Tour de l'Avenir
5th Grand Prix de Wallonie
8th Road race, UEC European Under-23 Road Championships
2024
2nd Time trial, National Under-23 Road Championships
4th Road race, National Road Championships
5th Overall Arctic Race of Norway
6th Grand Prix of Aargau Canton
8th Overall Deutschland Tour
9th Paris–Tours
10th Rund um Köln
2025 (2 pro wins)
1st Vuelta a Murcia
4th Gran Piemonte
4th Giro del Veneto
5th Overall Tour of Slovenia

1st Points classification
1st Mountains classification
1st Stage 2

6th Brabantse Pijl

=== Grand Tour general classification results timeline ===
Grand Tour	2025
Giro d'Italia	—
Tour de France	—
Vuelta a España	133

Legend
—	Did not compete
DNF	Did not finish
