= Pinarello–Q36.5 Pro Cycling Team =

Swiss cycling team

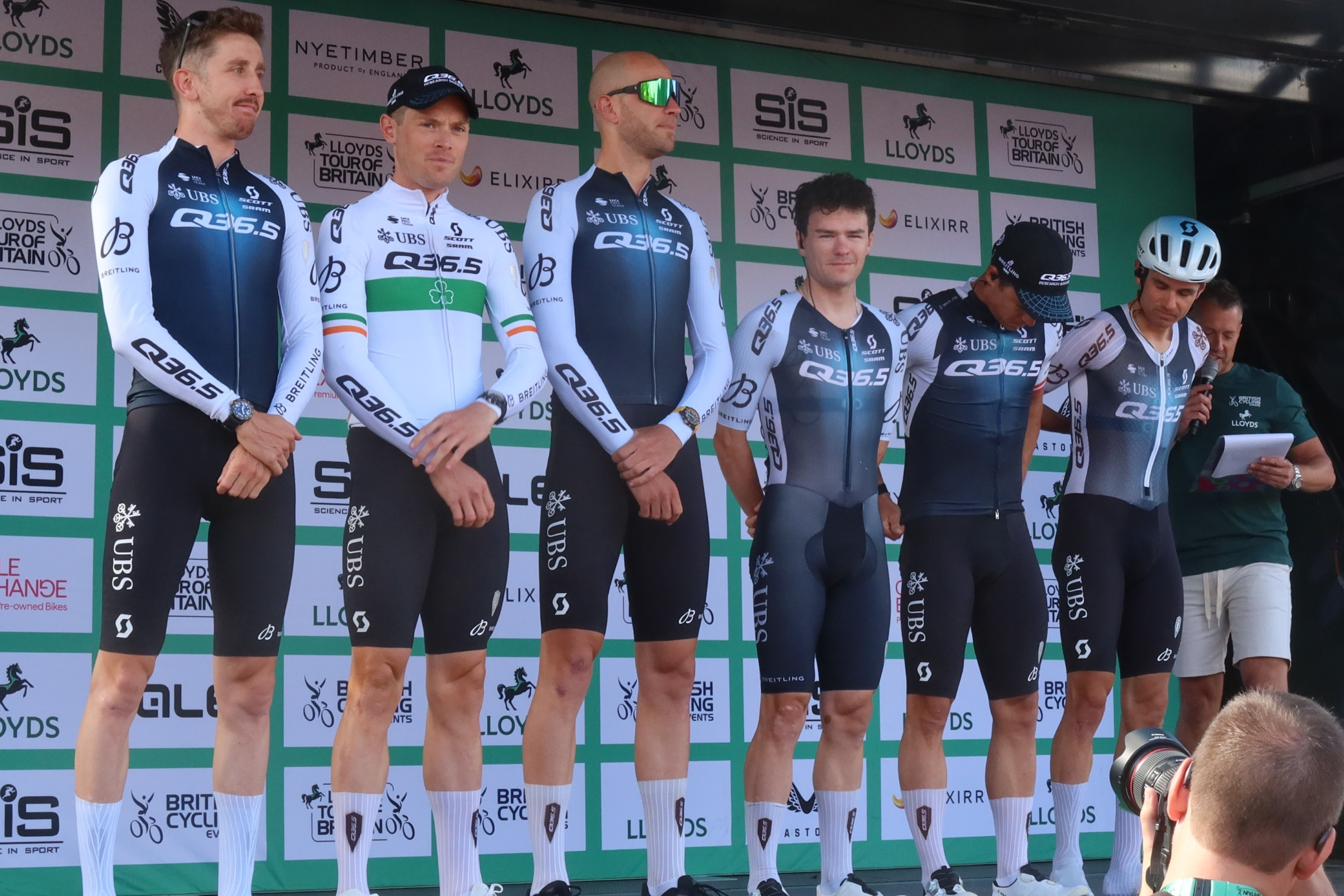
- Q36.5 at the 2025 Tour of Britain

Team information
- UCI code: PQT
- Registered: Switzerland
- Founded: 2023
- Discipline: Road
- Status: UCI ProTeam (2023–)
- Website: Team home page

Key personnel
- General manager: Douglas Ryder
- Team managers: Kurt Bogaerts, Gabriele Missaglia

Team name history
- 2023–2025; 2026–: Q36.5 Pro Cycling Team; Pinarello–Q36.5 Pro Cycling Team

Pinarello–Q36.5 Pro Cycling Team is a Swiss UCI ProTeam focusing on road bicycle racing. Douglas Ryder created the team which rode its first season in 2023. The team is sponsored by clothing brand Q36.5.

== History ==
=== Formation ===
After Team Qhubeka NextHash folded in 2021, Douglas Ryder said he always wanted to come back to cycling at the top level. In 2022 Ryder was looking for riders to race for his team in 2022. The team was formed with riders who already rode for UCI WorldTeams plus some riders from the second and third divisions. Four-time Grand Tour champion Vincenzo Nibali joined as the team's technical advisor and Giro d'Italia stage winner Gabriele Missaglia was hired as an assistant directeur sportif. In December 2022, Union Cycliste Internationale announced that Q36.5 Pro Cycling Team was granted a UCI ProTeam licence for 2023 season.

=== 2023 season ===
Q36.5 made an immediate impact with seven professional wins in its first season. Mark Donovan took overall victory at the 2023 Sibiu Cycling Tour, Matteo Moschetti had one-day victories at Clásica de Almería and Grand Prix d'Isbergues, and Nickolas Zukowsky was the Canadian National Road Race Champion. There were also stage victories for Matteo Badilatti at the Tour du Rwanda, Damien Howson at Vuelta a Asturias and Nicolò Parisini at CRO Race.

=== 2024 season ===
The team followed up a successful debut season with a further five victories including two national titles. Jannik Steimle and Jelte Krijnsen took one-day wins at Grand Prix de Denain and Druivenkoers Overijse respectively, and Giacomo Nizzolo won stage four at the Sibiu Cycling Tour. David de la Cruz was the Spanish National Time Trial Champion and Negasi Haylu Abreha won the Ethiopian National Road Race title.

=== 2025 season ===
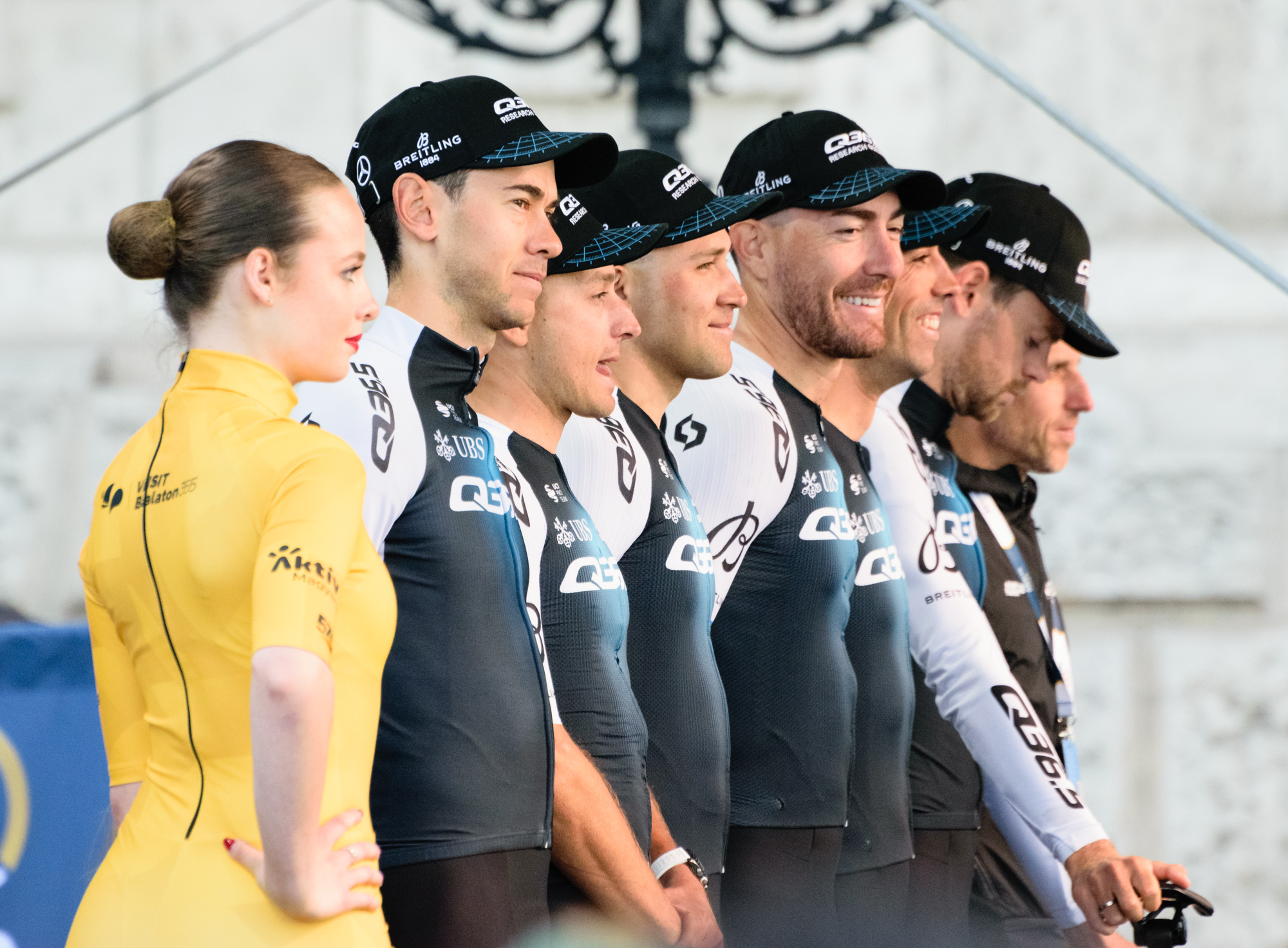
The team at the 2025 Tour de Hongrie

In December 2024, it was announced that Tom Pidcock would leave Ineos Grenadiers to join Q36.5. Tom's younger brother Joe Pidcock and Kurt Bogaerts, Ineos assistant directeur sportif and long-time personal coach of Tom, also joined the team. The moves paid immediate dividends, with Tom Pidcock taking two stages, the points competition and the first general classification victory of his career at his first race for the team, the 2025 AlUla Tour. Matteo Moschetti also won a stage to round out an excellent start to the season.

Fabio Christen took the first professional victory of his career at the 2025 Vuelta a Murcia, a one-day race in Murcia, Spain. Christen sprinted to the front with 200m to go and held off Aurélien Paret-Peintre and Christian Scaroni to take the win. Tom Pidcock added another early-season Spanish win with victory on stage two at Vuelta a Andalucía on his way to third place overall. Matteo Moschetti took his second win of the season on 8 March at Grand Prix Criquielion, the same day that Tom Pidcock finished second to reigning World Champion Tadej Pogačar at Strade Bianche.

Matteo Moschetti took his third and fourth wins of the season in April at the Tour of Hellas, outsprinting Dylan Groenewegen to the line twice to win stages one and five at the Greek race. The stage one result was the team's eighth win of the season, ensuring that 2025 would be its most successful year to date in terms of race victories.

On 31 March it was confirmed that Q36.5 would compete in its first Grand Tour race at the 2025 Giro d'Italia after being invited to participate by race organisers RCS Sport. Tom Pidcock was the highest overall finisher on the team, completing the race in 14th place. Pidcock and Moschetti both took stage podiums during the race, with Pidcock finishing third on stage five and Moschetti placing third on the final stage behind Olav Kooij and Kaden Groves as the riders sprinted to the finish in Rome.

Q36.5 were also invited to compete in the 2025 Vuelta a España after their strong performance in the Giro. Tom Pidcock finished on the podium in 3rd for the general classification, 3'11" behind winner Jonas Vingegaard. The team also finished in the top 10 in the team classification.

== Team roster ==
As of 16 January 2026.

| Rider | Date of birth |
|---|---|
| Xabier Azparren (ESP) | 25 February 1999 (age 27) |
| Matteo Badilatti (SUI) | 30 July 1992 (age 34) |
| Sjoerd Bax (NED) | 6 January 1996 (age 30) |
| Sam Bennett (IRE) | 16 October 1990 (age 35) |
| Walter Calzoni (ITA) | 8 August 2001 (age 25) |
| Marcel Camprubi (ESP) | 15 September 2001 (age 24) |
| Fabio Christen (SUI) | 29 June 2002 (age 24) |
| David de la Cruz (ESP) | 6 May 1989 (age 37) |
| Aimé De Gendt (BEL) | 17 June 1994 (age 32) |
| Mark Donovan (GBR) | 3 April 1999 (age 27) |
| Eddie Dunbar (IRE) | 1 September 1996 (age 30) |
| Frederik Frison (BEL) | 28 July 1992 (age 34) |
| Thomas Gloag (GBR) | 13 September 2001 (age 24) |
| David González (ESP) | 21 February 1996 (age 30) |
| Chris Harper (AUS) | 23 November 1994 (age 31) |

| Rider | Date of birth |
|---|---|
| Quinten Hermans (BEL) | 29 July 1995 (age 31) |
| Emmanuel Houcou (FRA) | 14 February 2003 (age 23) |
| Damien Howson (AUS) | 13 August 1992 (age 34) |
| Emīls Liepiņš (LAT) | 29 October 1992 (age 33) |
| Kamil Małecki (POL) | 2 January 1996 (age 30) |
| Xandro Meurisse (BEL) | 31 January 1992 (age 34) |
| Matteo Moschetti (ITA) | 14 August 1996 (age 30) |
| Nicolò Parisini (ITA) | 25 April 2000 (age 26) |
| Joe Pidcock (GBR) | 20 March 2002 (age 24) |
| Tom Pidcock (GBR) | 30 July 1999 (age 27) |
| Milan Vader (NED) | 18 February 1996 (age 30) |
| Brent Van Moer (BEL) | 12 January 1998 (age 28) |
| Harm Vanhoucke (BEL) | 17 June 1997 (age 29) |
| Fred Wright (GBR) | 13 June 1999 (age 27) |
| Nickolas Zukowsky (CAN) | 3 June 1998 (age 28) |

== Major wins ==
2023
Clásica de Almería, Matteo Moschetti
Stage 6 Tour du Rwanda, Matteo Badilatti
Stage 1 Vuelta a Asturias, Damien Howson
Canada National Road Race Championships, Nickolas Zukowsky
Overall Sibiu Cycling Tour, Mark Donovan
Grand Prix d'Isbergues, Matteo Moschetti
Stage 3 CRO Race, Nicolò Parisini
2024
Grand Prix de Denain, Jannik Steimle
Spain National Time Trial Championships, David de la Cruz
Ethiopia National Road Race Championships, Negasi Haylu Abreha
Stage 4 Sibiu Cycling Tour, Giacomo Nizzolo
Druivenkoers Overijse, Jelte Krijnsen
2025
Overall AlUla Tour, Tom Pidcock

Stages 2 & 4, Tom Pidcock
Stage 5, Matteo Moschetti

Vuelta a Murcia, Fabio Christen
Stage 2 Vuelta a Andalucía, Tom Pidcock
Grand Prix Criquielion, Matteo Moschetti
Stages 1 & 5 Tour of Hellas, Matteo Moschetti
Stage 2 Tour of Slovenia, Fabio Christen
Ireland National Road Race Championships, Rory Townsend
Stage 2 Vuelta a Burgos, Matteo Moschetti
Stage 3 Arctic Race of Norway, Tom Pidcock
Hamburg Cyclassics, Rory Townsend
2026
Stage 5 Vuelta a Andalucía, Tom Pidcock
Milano–Torino, Tom Pidcock

== National champions ==
2023
Canada Road Race, Nickolas Zukowsky
2024
Spain Time Trial, David de la Cruz
Ethiopia Road Race, Negasi Haylu Abreha
2025
Ireland Road Race, Rory Townsend

=== Supplementary statistics ===
Grand Tours by highest finishing position
| Race | 2023 | 2024 | 2025 |
| Giro d'Italia | – | – | 16 |
| Tour de France | – | – | – |
| Vuelta a España | – | – | 3 |
Major week-long stage races by highest finishing position
| Race | 2023 | 2024 | 2025 |
| Tour Down Under | – | – | – |
| Paris–Nice | – | – | – |
| Tirreno–Adriatico | 17 | 89 | 6 |
| Volta a Catalunya | – | – | – |
| Tour of the Basque Country | – | 37 | – |
| Tour de Romandie | – | 15 | – |
| Critérium du Dauphiné | – | 24 | – |
| Tour de Suisse | 18 | 14 | 31 |
| Tour de Pologne | 24 | 20 | – |
| Benelux Tour | – | – | – |
Monuments by highest finishing position
| Monument | 2023 | 2024 | 2025 |
| Milan–San Remo | 42 | – | 39 |
| Tour of Flanders | 50 | 14 | 56 |
| Paris–Roubaix | 85 | 18 | 32 |
| Liège–Bastogne–Liège | – | – | 9 |
| Il Lombardia | 72 | – | 6 |
Classics by highest finishing position
| Classic | 2023 | 2024 | 2025 |
| Omloop Het Nieuwsblad | – | 49 | 38 |
| Kuurne–Brussels–Kuurne | 29 | 28 | 45 |
| Strade Bianche | 53 | 45 | 2 |
| E3 Harelbeke | 56 | 29 | 32 |
| Gent–Wevelgem | – | 31 | 63 |
| Dwars door Vlaanderen | 47 | 42 | 42 |
| Amstel Gold Race | 58 | 23 | 9 |
| La Flèche Wallonne | – | 29 | 3 |
| Clásica de San Sebastián | – | – | – |
| Paris–Tours | 53 | 9 | 77 |

Legend
| — | Did not compete |
| DNS | Did not start |
| DNF | Did not finish |
| NH | Not held |
