= 2025 Vuelta a Murcia =

2025 UCI Europe Tour

Race details
- Dates: 15 February 2025
- Distance: 199.6 km (124.0 mi)
- Winning time: 4h 38' 09"

Results
	Winner	Fabio Christen (SUI)	(Q36.5 Pro Cycling Team)
	Second	Aurélien Paret-Peintre (FRA)	(Decathlon–AG2R La Mondiale)
	Third	Christian Scaroni (ITA)	(XDS Astana Team)

The 2025 Vuelta a Murcia was the 45th edition of the Vuelta a Murcia road cycling race. It was held on 15 February 2025 in the titular region of southeastern Spain as a category 1.1 event on the 2025 UCI Europe Tour calendar.

== Teams ==
Five UCI WorldTeams, nine UCI ProTeams, three UCI Continental and one national team made up the eighteen teams that participated in the race.

UCI WorldTeams

- Decathlon–AG2R La Mondiale
- Intermarché–Wanty
- Movistar Team
- UAE Team Emirates XRG
- XDS Astana Team

UCI ProTeams

- Burgos Burpellet BH
- Caja Rural–Seguros RGA
- Equipo Kern Pharma
- Euskaltel–Euskadi
- Q36.5 Pro Cycling Team
- Team Flanders–Baloise
- Team TotalEnergies
- Tudor Pro Cycling Team
- VF Group–Bardiani–CSF–Faizanè

UCI Continental Teams

- Illes Balears Arabay
- Petrolike
- Project Echelon Racing

National Teams

- Spain

== Results ==
Result
Rank	Rider	Team	Time
1	Fabio Christen (SUI)	Q36.5 Pro Cycling Team	4h 38' 09"
2	Aurélien Paret-Peintre (FRA)	Decathlon–AG2R La Mondiale	+ 0"
3	Christian Scaroni (ITA)	XDS Astana Team	+ 0"
4	Clément Champoussin (FRA)	XDS Astana Team	+ 0"
5	Lorenzo Fortunato (ITA)	XDS Astana Team	+ 0"
6	Nairo Quintana (COL)	Movistar Team	+ 0"
7	Isaac del Toro (MEX)	UAE Team Emirates XRG	+ 0"
8	Tim Wellens (BEL)	UAE Team Emirates XRG	+ 2"
9	Adrià Pericas (ESP)	UAE Team Emirates XRG	+ 5"
10	Jordan Labrosse (FRA)	Decathlon–AG2R La Mondiale	+ 10"
