= Joe Pidcock =

British cyclist (born 2002)

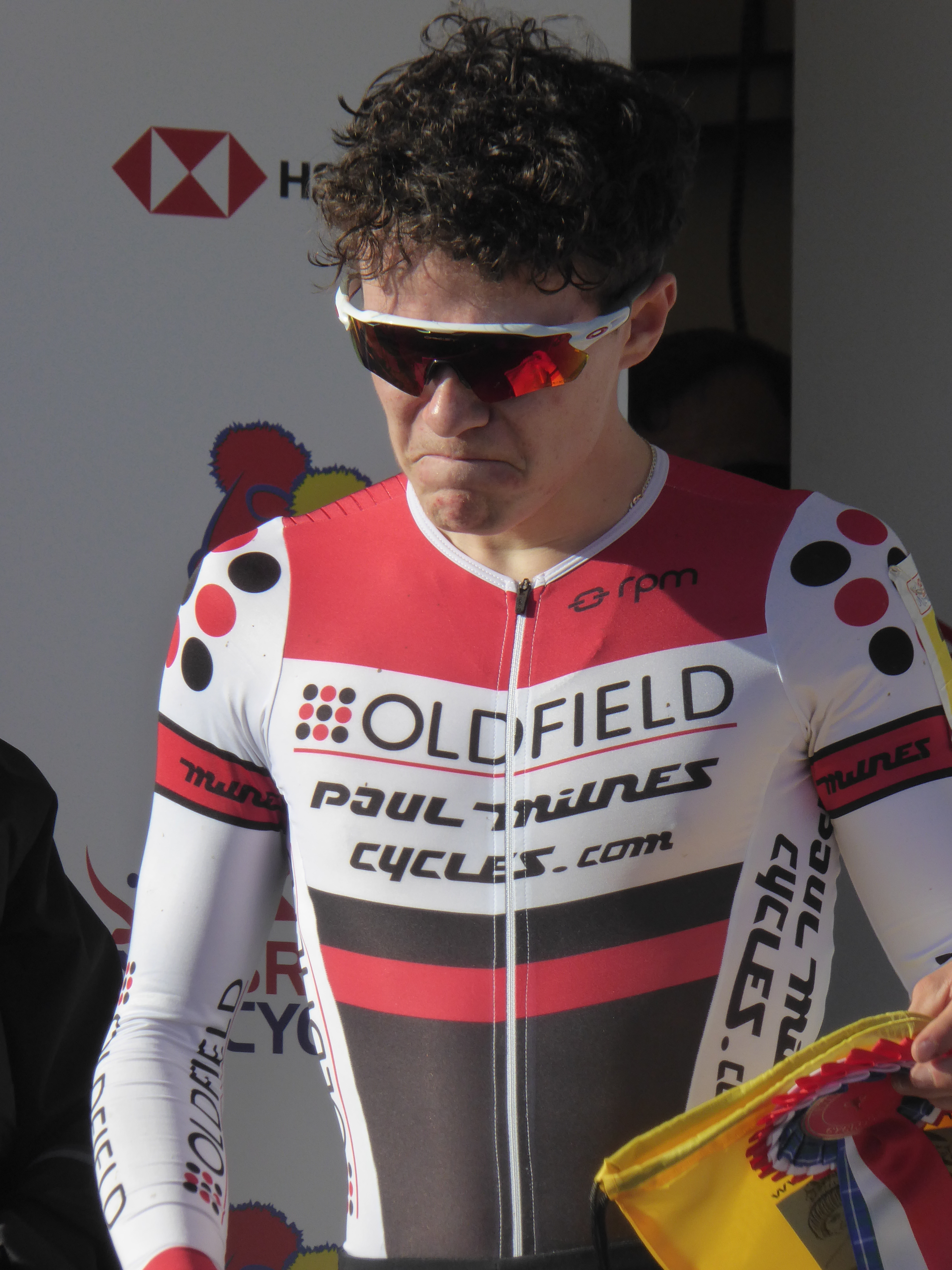
- Pidcock in 2018

Personal information
- Full name: Joseph Pidcock
- Born: 20 March 2002 (age 24) Leeds, England
- Height: 1.70 m (5 ft 7 in)
- Weight: 57 kg (126 lb)

Cycling career
- Sport: Cycling
- Current team: Pinarello–Q36.5 Pro Cycling Team
- Discipline: Road
- Role: Rider

Amateur teams
- 2017–2018: PH–MAS–Paul Milnes–Oldfield ERT
- 2019–2020: Fensham Howes–MAS Design

Professional teams
- 2021–2022: Équipe Continentale Groupama–FDJ
- 2023–2024: Trinity Racing
- 2025–: Q36.5 Pro Cycling Team

Joseph Pidcock (born 20 March 2002) is a British road racing cyclist who rides for UCI ProTeam Pinarello–Q36.5 Pro Cycling Team. He is the brother of fellow cyclist Tom Pidcock.

== Early life ==
From Leeds, he competed in cyclo-cross as well as road racing before deciding to focus just on road racing. He won the U16 boys title at the Youth Tour of London in 2018.

== Career ==
He rode for the Équipe Continentale Groupama–FDJ in 2021, prior to riding for Trinity Racing from 2023. In 2024, he won a stage at the Ronde de l'Isard and a stage of the Rás Mumhan in Ireland. He was in the lead group of the 2024 Paris-Roubaix espoirs race but suffered a badly-timed mechanical issue with his bike and finished in 59th place.

Ahead of the 2025 season he signed for UCI ProTeam Q36.5 Pro Cycling Team. He suffered a concussion at the Trofeo Laigueglia in early March 2025 and did not race again until April. His next race was at Paris–Roubaix where he was a late inclusion in the Q36.5 team. He ended up being the last finisher of the race after being involved in a series of crashes, finishing 21 minutes after the previous rider, however he spoke after the race of his determination to finish and described it as a good experience and "still quite cool".

== Personal life ==
He is the son of cycling team manager Giles Pidcock and brother of cyclist Tom Pidcock. In November 2023, he received a diagnosis for ADHD. He described how medication for the condition had helped him, writing on his private Instagram page that it felt "as if I suddenly stopped walking through 3 feet deep water like I had all my life."

== Major results ==
2019
9th Overall Keizer der Juniores
2020
7th Overall La Philippe Gilbert Juniors
2024
1st Stage 5 Ronde de l'Isard
1st Stage 4 Rás Mumhan
2025
4th Overall Tour de Kyushu
2026
8th Hong Kong Cyclothon
