= Sergio Martín =

Spanish cyclist

Personal information
- Full name: Sergio Román Martín Galán
- Born: 13 December 1996 (age 29) Galapagar, Spain
- Height: 1.82 m (6 ft 0 in)
- Weight: 69 kg (152 lb)

Cycling career
- Sport: Cycling
- Current team: Retired
- Discipline: Road
- Role: Rider

Amateur teams
- 2015–2016: Bicicletas Rodríguez–Extremadura
- 2017–2018: Caja Rural–Seguros RGA Amateur
- 2019: Caja Rural–Seguros RGA (stagiaire)

Professional team
- 2020–2023: Caja Rural–Seguros RGA

Sergio Román Martín Galán (born 13 December 1996 in Galapagar) is a Spanish former cyclist, who competed as a professional from 20230 to 2023 for UCI ProTeam Caja Rural–Seguros RGA.

== Major results ==
=== Grand Tour general classification results timeline ===
Grand Tour	2021
Giro d'Italia	—
Tour de France	—
Vuelta a España	DNF

Legend
—	Did not compete
DNF	Did not finish
