= Gal Glivar =

Slovenian cyclist

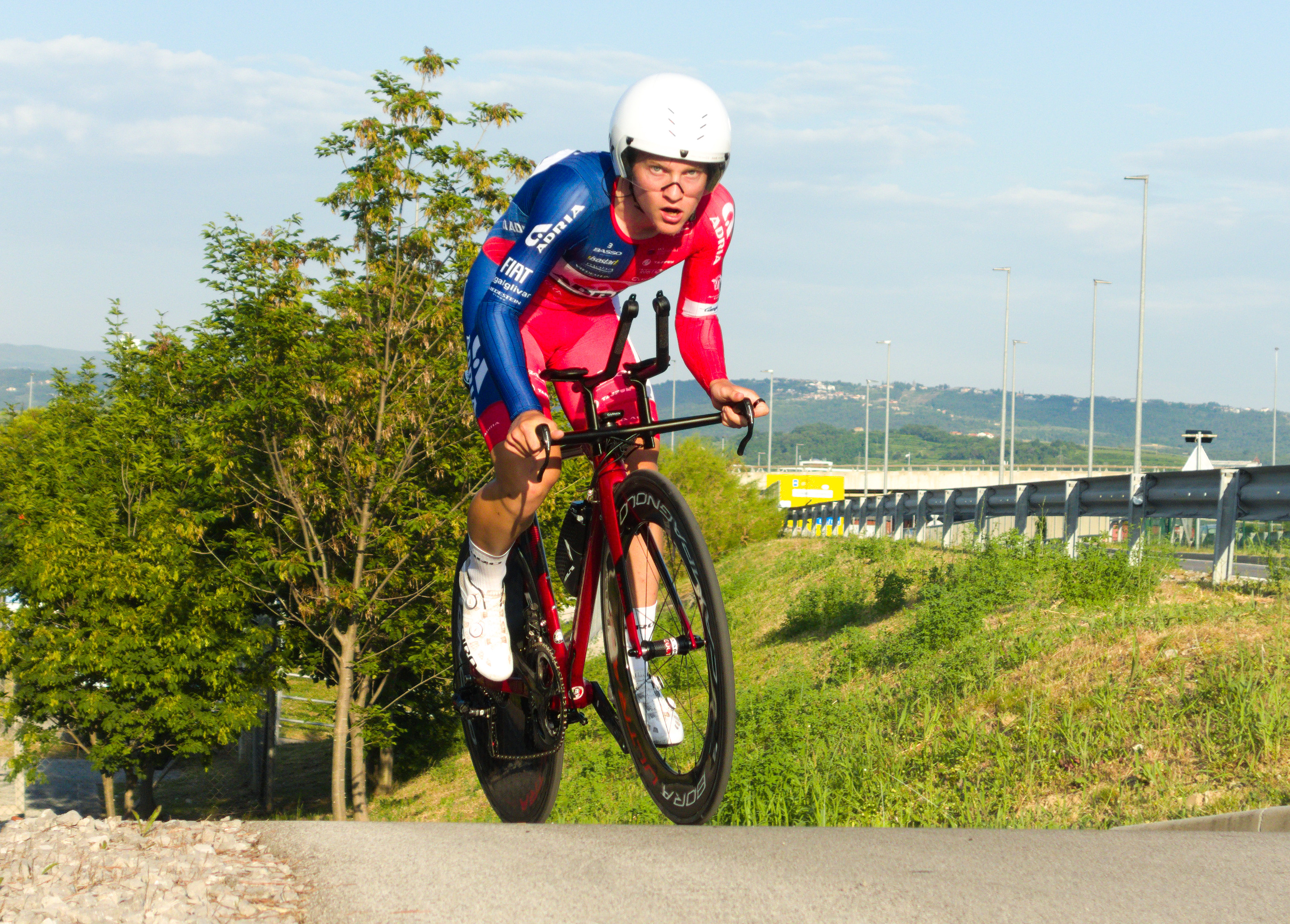
- Glivar in 2021

Personal information
- Born: 1 May 2002 (age 24) Novo Mesto, Slovenia
- Height: 1.71 m (5 ft 7 in)
- Weight: 62 kg (137 lb)

Cycling career
- Sport: Cycling
- Current team: Alpecin–Premier Tech
- Disciplines: Road; Track
- Role: Rider

Professional teams
- 2021–2023: Adria Mobil
- 2023: UAE Team Emirates (stagiaire)
- 2024: UAE Team Emirates Gen Z
- 2025–: Alpecin–Deceuninck

Gal Glivar (born 1 May 2002) is a Slovenian professional racing cyclist, who currently rides for UCI WorldTeam Alpecin–Premier Tech.

He is the son of Srečko Glivar, who is a former cyclist and a directeur sportif of Kolesarski Klub Novo Mesto.

== Major results ==
2019
National Junior Road Championships

1st Road race
3rd Time trial

6th Gran Premio Eccellenze Valli del Soligo (TTT)
2020
1st Time trial, National Junior Road Championships
2021
National Track Championships

1st Team pursuit
2nd Omnium
2nd Elimination

2023
1st Overall Carpathian Couriers Race

1st Points classification
1st Stages 3 & 5

1st Overall Orlen Nations Grand Prix
4th GP Gorenjska
5th Overall CRO Race
2024
1st Time trial, National Under-23 Road Championships
1st Overall Tour of Sharjah

1st Young rider classification
1st Stage 3 (ITT)

1st Giro del Belvedere
2nd Road race, National Road Championships
5th Trofeo Piva
7th Gent–Wevelgem Beloften
8th Trofeo Città di San Vendemiano
2026
8th Cadel Evans Great Ocean Road Race
