= Golte Ski Resort =

Ski resort in Slovenia

- Interactive map of Golte Ski Resort
- Location: Mozirje; Kamnik–Savinja Alps; Slovenia
- Nearest city: Velenje
- Coordinates: 46.3560°N 14.9316°E
- Vertical: 600 meters (2,000 ft) total
- Top elevation: 1,600 meters (5,200 ft)
- Base elevation: 1,000 meters (3,300 ft)
- Skiable area: 185 acres (0.75 km^{2})
- Trails: Total 12 kilometers (7.5 mi) 4 kilometers (2.5 mi); 7 kilometers (4.3 mi); 1 kilometer (0.62 mi)
- Longest run: FIS Veleslalom (1.64 kilometers or 1.02 miles)
- Lift system: 7 total 2 surface 1 cablecar 2 doublechair 1 triplechair 1 ski carpet
- Snowmaking: yes
- Website: golte.si

The Golte Ski Resort is a Slovenian ski resort just above Mozirje in the Kamnik–Savinja Alps. It has 12 kilometers (7.5 mi) of ski slopes and 5 kilometers (3.1 mi) of cross-country skiing tracks. The closest city is Velenje. There is hiking and mountain biking in the area in the summer.

== Resort statistics ==
Elevation
Summit: 1,600 meters (5,200 ft)
Base: 1,000 meters (3,300 ft)

Ski terrain
0.75 square kilometers (0.29 sq mi) - covering 12 km (7.5 mi) of ski slopes on one mountain.

Slope difficulty
- Expert 1 kilometer (0.62 mi)
- Intermediate 7 kilometers (4.3 mi)
- Beginner 4 kilometers (2.5 mi)

Vertical drop
- 1,000 meters (3,300 ft) in total

Longest run: FIS Veleslalom (1.64 kilometers or 1.02 miles)

Average winter daytime temperature:

Average annual snowfall:

Lift capacity: 6,300 skiers per hour (altogether)

Ski season opens: December

Ski season ends: March

Snow conditions phone line: +386 0 (4) 5747100

== Ski lifts ==
Name	Length	Category
Slalom	870 meters (2,850 ft)	
Bela peč	780 meters (2,560 ft)	
Varianta I	430 meters (1,410 ft)	
FIS Slalom	620 meters (2,030 ft)	
Varianta II	370 meters (1,210 ft)	
Preseka	420 meters (1,380 ft)	
Turist	760 meters (2,490 ft)	
Podleška planina	1,050 meters (3,440 ft)	
FIS Veleslalom	1,640 meters (5,380 ft)	
Stari Stani	730 meters (2,400 ft)	
Blatnik	615 meters (2,018 ft)	
Ciciban	410 meters (1,350 ft)	
Družinska proga	1,010 meters (3,310 ft)	
Bukovc	310 meters (1,020 ft)	
Lahovnik	850 meters (2,790 ft)	
Beli zajec	1,530 meters (5,020 ft)	
Mulda	240 meters (790 ft)	
