= Nicolò Parisini =

Italian cyclist

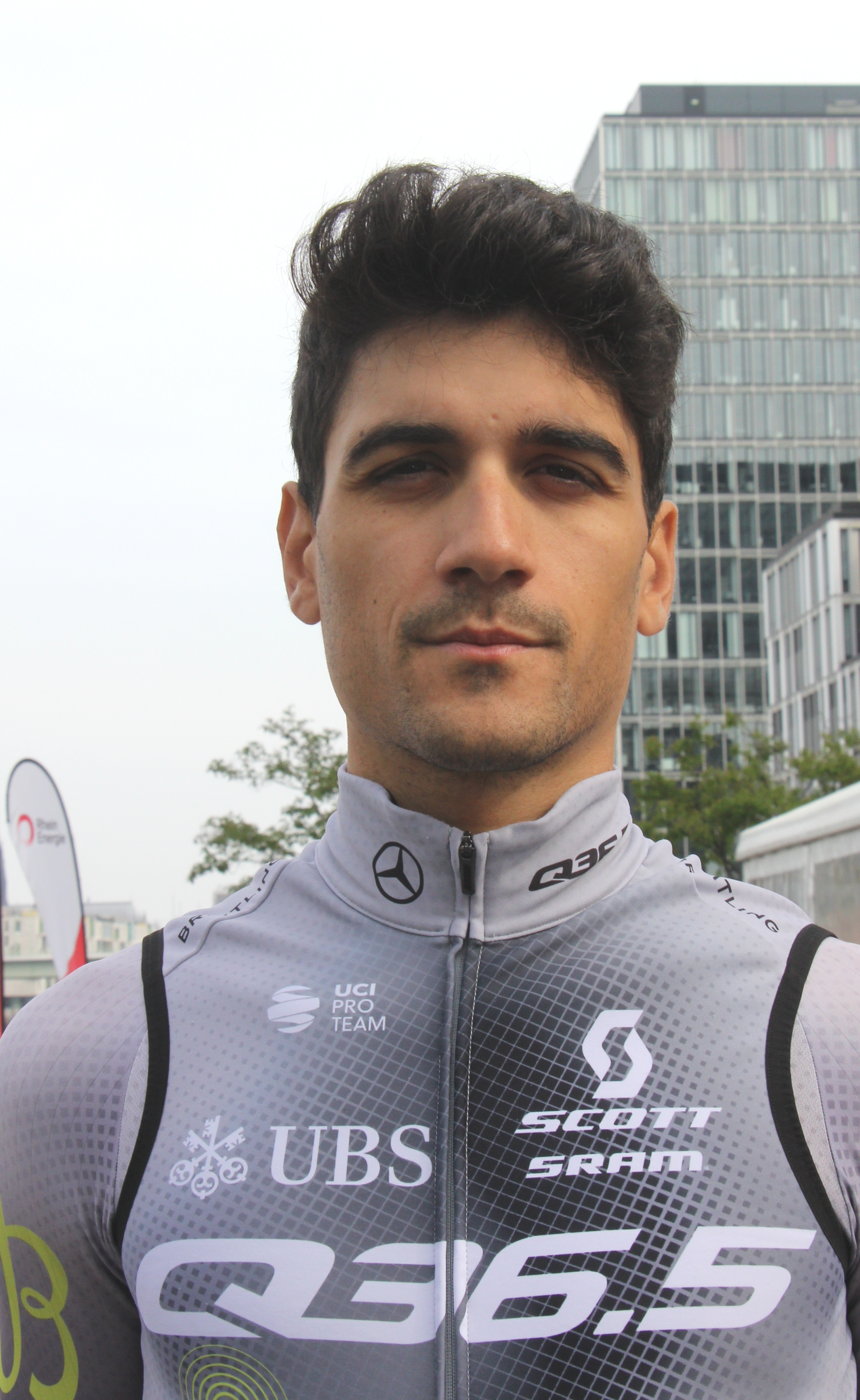
- Parisini in 2023

Personal information
- Born: 25 April 2000 (age 26) Voghera, Italy
- Height: 1.83 m (6 ft 0 in)
- Weight: 65 kg (143 lb)

Cycling career
- Sport: Cycling
- Current team: Pinarello–Q36.5 Pro Cycling Team
- Discipline: Road
- Role: Rider

Amateur team
- 2017–2018: GB Junior Team

Professional teams
- 2019–2021: Team Beltrami TSA–Hopplà–Petroli Firenze
- 2022: Team Qhubeka
- 2023–: Q36.5 Pro Cycling Team

Nicolò Parisini (born 25 April 2000) is an Italian racing cyclist, who currently rides for UCI ProTeam Pinarello–Q36.5 Pro Cycling Team. His professional accomplishments include winning Stage 3 of the 2023 CRO Race.

== Major results ==
2018
1st Overall Tre Giorni Ciclista Bresciana

1st Stages 1 & 3

2nd Road race, National Junior Road Championships
4th Overall Aubel–Thimister–Stavelot
6th Trofeo Comune di Vertova
7th Gran Premio dell'Arno
2021
7th Giro del Medio Brenta
2022
6th Road race, UEC European Under-23 Road Championships
2023 (1 pro win)
6th Overall CRO Race

1st Stage 3
