= Sjoerd Bax =

Dutch cyclist (born 1996)

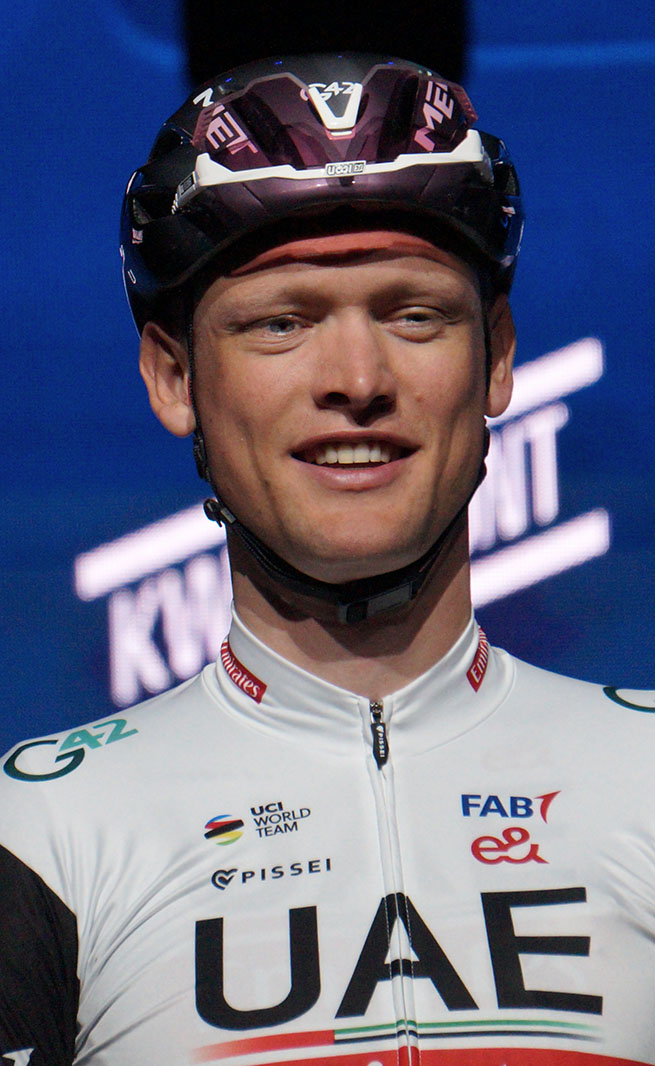
- Bax in 2023

Personal information
- Born: 6 January 1996 (age 30) Gorinchem, Netherlands
- Height: 1.9 m (6 ft 3 in)
- Weight: 75 kg (165 lb)

Cycling career
- Sport: Cycling
- Current team: Pinarello–Q36.5 Pro Cycling Team
- Discipline: Road
- Role: Rider

Amateur team
- 2017: RCMP Jan van Arckel

Professional teams
- 2015–2016: Rabobank Development Team
- 2017–2018: Delta Cycling Rotterdam
- 2019–2021: Metec–TKH
- 2022: Alpecin–Fenix
- 2023–2024: UAE Team Emirates
- 2025–: Q36.5 Pro Cycling Team

Sjoerd Bax (born 6 January 1996) is a Dutch cyclist, who currently rides for UCI ProTeam Pinarello–Q36.5 Pro Cycling Team.

== Major results ==
2014
1st Time trial, National Junior Road Championships
3rd Overall Aubel–Thimister–La Gleize
10th Road race, UCI Junior Road World Championships
2015
1st Young rider classification, Le Triptyque des Monts et Châteaux
2018
3rd Flèche Ardennaise
4th Overall Carpathian Couriers Race
7th Overall Rás Tailteann
8th Overall Olympia's Tour
2019
5th Overall Rhône-Alpes Isère Tour

1st Points classification
1st Stage 2

5th Overall Ronde de l'Oise
6th Overall Flèche du Sud
9th Overall CRO Race
2021
1st Overall Alpes Isère Tour

1st Points classification
1st Stages 3 & 5

2nd Road race, National Road Championships
2nd Overall Tour de la Mirabelle

1st Stage 2

2022 (2 pro wins)
1st Coppa Agostoni
1st Stage 7 Tour de Langkawi
4th Overall Tour de Luxembourg
10th Overall Arctic Race of Norway
2023 (1)
1st Trofeo Matteotti
3rd Time trial, National Road Championships
9th Coppa Agostoni
10th Time trial, UEC European Road Championships
10th Nokere Koerse
2024
3rd Time trial, National Road Championships
2025
9th Overall International Tour of Hellas
2026
3rd Time trial, National Road Championships
