= List of teams and cyclists in the 2026 Vuelta a España =

List of cyclists

The following is a list of teams and cyclists who participated in the 2026 Vuelta a España.

== Teams ==
Twenty-three teams took part in the race. All eighteen UCI WorldTeams were automatically invited. They were joined by five UCI ProTeams; the three highest ranked UCI ProTeams in 2025 (Tudor Pro Cycling Team, Pinarello–Q36.5 Pro Cycling Team and Cofidis), along with two other Spanish teams (Burgos Burpellet BH and Equipo Kern Pharma). The teams were announced on 30 January 2026.

=== UCI WorldTeams ===
- Alpecin–Premier Tech
- Decathlon CMA CGM
- EF Education–EasyPost
- Groupama–FDJ United
- Lidl–Trek
- Lotto–Intermarché
- Movistar Team
- Netcompany INEOS
- NSN Cycling Team
- Red Bull–Bora–Hansgrohe
- Soudal–Quick-Step
- Team Bahrain Victorious
- Team Jayco–AlUla
- Team Picnic–PostNL
- Visma–Lease a Bike
- UAE Team Emirates XRG
- Uno-X Mobility
- XDS Astana Team

=== UCI ProTeams ===
- Burgos Burpellet BH
- Cofidis
- Equipo Kern Pharma
- Pinarello–Q36.5 Pro Cycling Team
- Tudor Pro Cycling Team

== Cyclists ==
Legend
No.	Starting number worn by the rider during the Vuelta
Pos.	Position in the general classification
Time	Deficit to the winner of the general classification
‡	Denotes riders born on or after 1 January 2001, and thus eligible for the young rider classification
	Denotes the winner of the general classification
	Denotes the winner of the points classification
	Denotes the winner of the mountains classification
	Denotes the winner of the young rider classification
	Denotes the winner of the team classification
	Denotes the winner of the combativity award
DNS	Denotes a rider who did not start, followed by the stage before which he withdrew
DNF	Denotes a rider who did not finish, followed by the stage in which he withdrew
DSQ	Denotes a rider who was disqualified from the race, followed by the stage in which this occurred
OTL	Denotes a rider who finished outside the time limit, followed by the stage in which he did so
Ages correct as of Saturday 22 August 2026, the date on which the Vuelta began

=== By starting number ===
No.	Name	Nationality	Team	Age	Pos.	Time
1	Primož Roglič	Slovenia	Red Bull–Bora–Hansgrohe	36	2	+ 2' 15"
2	Finn Fisher-Black ‡	New Zealand	Red Bull–Bora–Hansgrohe	24	52	+ 2h 36' 23"
3	Jordi Meeus	Belgium	Red Bull–Bora–Hansgrohe	28	141	+ 5h 24' 31"
4	Gianni Moscon	Italy	Red Bull–Bora–Hansgrohe	32	121	+ 4h 24' 15"
5	Callum Thornley ‡	Great Britain	Red Bull–Bora–Hansgrohe	23	128	+ 4h 32' 20"
6	Luke Tuckwell ‡	Australia	Red Bull–Bora–Hansgrohe	22	46	+ 2h 23' 51"
7	Gianni Vermeersch	Belgium	Red Bull–Bora–Hansgrohe	33	88	+ 3h 29' 09"
8	Frederik Wandahl ‡	Denmark	Red Bull–Bora–Hansgrohe	25	96	+ 3h 44' 17"
11	Tadej Pogačar	Slovenia	UAE Team Emirates XRG	27	DNF-8	–
12	João Almeida	Portugal	UAE Team Emirates XRG	28	91	+ 3h 30' 16"
13	Domen Novak	Slovenia	UAE Team Emirates XRG	31	140	+ 5h 22' 08"
14	Ivo Oliveira	Portugal	UAE Team Emirates XRG	29	99	+ 3h 46' 43"
15	Pavel Sivakov	France	UAE Team Emirates XRG	29	DNF-13	–
16	Pablo Torres ‡	Spain	UAE Team Emirates XRG	20	DNF-9	–
17	Kevin Vermaerke	United States	UAE Team Emirates XRG	25	29	+ 1h 31' 49"
18	Jay Vine	Australia	UAE Team Emirates XRG	30	DNF-12	–
21	Enric Mas	Spain	Movistar Team	31	1	73h 52' 55"
22	Jorge Arcas	Spain	Movistar Team	34	110	+ 4h 00' 31"
23	Orluis Aular	Venezuela	Movistar Team	29	122	+ 4h 25' 11"
24	Carlos Canal ‡	Spain	Movistar Team	25	90	+ 3h 30' 08"
25	Pablo Castrillo ‡	Spain	Movistar Team	25	81	+ 3h 14' 39"
26	Raúl García Pierna ‡	Spain	Movistar Team	25	22	+ 1h 16' 45"
27	Iván Romeo ‡	Spain	Movistar Team	23	73	+ 3h 01' 28"
28	Cian Uijtdebroeks ‡	Belgium	Movistar Team	23	DNS-5	–
31	Wout van Aert	Belgium	Visma–Lease a Bike	31	44	+ 2h 15' 35"
32	Bruno Armirail	France	Visma–Lease a Bike	32	60	+ 2h 40' 33"
33	Matthew Brennan ‡	Great Britain	Visma–Lease a Bike	21	108	+ 4h 00' 02"
34	Steven Kruijswijk	Netherlands	Visma–Lease a Bike	39	79	+ 3h 08' 32"
35	Sepp Kuss	United States	Visma–Lease a Bike	31	5	+ 8' 45"
36	Christophe Laporte	France	Visma–Lease a Bike	33	DNF-14	–
37	Jørgen Nordhagen ‡	Norway	Visma–Lease a Bike	21	37	+ 2h 00' 41"
38	Ben Tulett ‡	Great Britain	Visma–Lease a Bike	24	DNS-12	–
41	Felix Gall	Austria	Decathlon CMA CGM	28	3	+ 2' 44"
42	Léo Bisiaux ‡	France	Decathlon CMA CGM	21	12	+ 25' 03"
43	Oscar Chamberlain ‡	Australia	Decathlon CMA CGM	21	114	+ 4h 08' 22"
44	Sander De Pestel	Belgium	Decathlon CMA CGM	27	80	+ 3h 13' 33"
45	Jordan Labrosse ‡	France	Decathlon CMA CGM	23	DNF-14	–
46	Gregor Mühlberger	Austria	Decathlon CMA CGM	32	DNF-13	–
47	Matthew Riccitello ‡	United States	Decathlon CMA CGM	24	DNF-20	–
48	Callum Scotson	Australia	Decathlon CMA CGM	30	38	+ 2h 03' 02"
51	David de la Cruz	Spain	Pinarello–Q36.5 Pro Cycling Team	37	105	+ 3h 57' 34"
52	Xabier Mikel Azparren	Spain	Pinarello–Q36.5 Pro Cycling Team	27	101	+ 3h 48' 45"
53	Walter Calzoni ‡	Italy	Pinarello–Q36.5 Pro Cycling Team	25	70	+ 2h 56' 58"
54	Marcel Camprubí ‡	Spain	Pinarello–Q36.5 Pro Cycling Team	24	65	+ 2h 50' 55"
55	Eddie Dunbar	Ireland	Pinarello–Q36.5 Pro Cycling Team	29	DNF-20	–
56	Thomas Gloag ‡	Great Britain	Pinarello–Q36.5 Pro Cycling Team	24	67	+ 2h 53' 29"
57	David González	Spain	Pinarello–Q36.5 Pro Cycling Team	30	DNS-12	–
58	Milan Vader	Netherlands	Pinarello–Q36.5 Pro Cycling Team	30	47	+ 2h 28' 23"
61	Oscar Onley ‡	Great Britain	Netcompany INEOS	23	6	+ 9' 28"
62	Jack Haig	Australia	Netcompany INEOS	32	24	+ 1h 21' 35"
63	Lucas Hamilton	Australia	Netcompany INEOS	30	84	+ 3h 20' 41"
64	Axel Laurance ‡	France	Netcompany INEOS	25	63	+ 2h 46' 19"
65	Carlos Rodríguez ‡	Spain	Netcompany INEOS	25	36	+ 1h 57' 52"
66	Embret Svestad-Bårdseng ‡	Norway	Netcompany INEOS	23	20	+ 1h 10' 46"
67	Joshua Tarling ‡	Great Britain	Netcompany INEOS	22	DNF-6	–
68	Ben Turner	Great Britain	Netcompany INEOS	27	DNF-10	–
71	Pello Bilbao	Spain	Team Bahrain Victorious	36	33	+ 1h 54' 02"
72	Santiago Buitrago	Colombia	Team Bahrain Victorious	26	17	+ 50' 56"
73	Roman Ermakov ‡	Slovenia	Team Bahrain Victorious	21	119	+ 4h 16' 27"
74	Matevž Govekar	Slovenia	Team Bahrain Victorious	26	137	+ 5h 01' 15"
75	Pau Miquel	Spain	Team Bahrain Victorious	26	42	+ 2h 13' 01"
76	Jakob Omrzel ‡	Slovenia	Team Bahrain Victorious	20	7	+ 10' 38"
77	Mathijs Paasschens	Netherlands	Team Bahrain Victorious	30	102	+ 3h 48' 51"
78	Attila Valter	Hungary	Team Bahrain Victorious	28	45	+ 2h 18' 39"
81	Mattias Skjelmose	Denmark	Lidl–Trek	25	13	+ 25' 43"
82	Julien Bernard	France	Lidl–Trek	34	49	+ 2h 29' 13"
83	Lennard Kämna	Germany	Lidl–Trek	29	71	+ 2h 57' 47"
84	Patrick Konrad	Austria	Lidl–Trek	34	40	+ 2h 08' 19"
85	Jacopo Mosca	Italy	Lidl–Trek	32	93	+ 3h 37' 51"
86	Mathias Sunekær Norsgaard	Denmark	Lidl–Trek	29	142	+ 6h 15' 51"
87	Thibau Nys ‡	Belgium	Lidl–Trek	23	112	+ 4h 06' 27"
88	Mads Pedersen	Denmark	Lidl–Trek	30	DNS-11	–
91	Clément Berthet	France	Groupama–FDJ United	29	8	+ 11' 41"
92	Olivier Le Gac	France	Groupama–FDJ United	32	131	+ 4h 41' 40"
93	Valentin Madouas	France	Groupama–FDJ United	30	35	+ 1h 56' 47"
94	Guillaume Martin	France	Groupama–FDJ United	33	11	+ 20' 14"
95	Rudy Molard	France	Groupama–FDJ United	36	51	+ 2h 33' 24"
96	Enzo Paleni ‡	France	Groupama–FDJ United	24	62	+ 2h 44' 58"
97	Rémy Rochas	France	Groupama–FDJ United	30	69	+ 2h 55' 00"
98	Bastien Tronchon ‡	France	Groupama–FDJ United	24	75	+ 3h 03' 31"
101	Kaden Groves	Australia	Alpecin–Premier Tech	27	DNF-9	–
102	Francesco Busatto ‡	Italy	Alpecin–Premier Tech	23	DNF-13	–
103	Lindsay De Vylder	Belgium	Alpecin–Premier Tech	31	DNS-12	–
104	Ramses Debruyne ‡	Belgium	Alpecin–Premier Tech	23	32	+ 1h 50' 31"
105	Gal Glivar ‡	Slovenia	Alpecin–Premier Tech	24	98	+ 3h 46' 27"
106	Michael Gogl	Austria	Alpecin–Premier Tech	32	94	+ 3h 40' 20"
107	Hugo Houle	Canada	Alpecin–Premier Tech	35	DNF-14	–
108	Sente Sentjens ‡	Belgium	Alpecin–Premier Tech	20	DNF-13	–
111	Alexey Lutsenko	Kazakhstan	NSN Cycling Team	33	DNS-13	–
112	George Bennett	New Zealand	NSN Cycling Team	36	DNS-10	–
113	Jan Hirt	Czechia	NSN Cycling Team	35	15	+ 43' 20"
114	Hugo Hofstetter	France	NSN Cycling Team	32	76	+ 3h 03' 47"
115	Moritz Kretschy ‡	Germany	NSN Cycling Team	24	DNS-14	–
116	Pau Martí ‡	Spain	NSN Cycling Team	21	59	+ 2h 40' 08"
117	Nick Schultz	Australia	NSN Cycling Team	31	107	+ 3h 58' 53"
118	Floris Van Tricht ‡	Belgium	NSN Cycling Team	25	DNF-8	–
121	Mikel Landa	Spain	Soudal–Quick-Step	36	30	+ 1h 36' 39"
122	Alberto Dainese	Italy	Soudal–Quick-Step	28	130	+ 4h 38' 17"
123	Gianmarco Garofoli ‡	Italy	Soudal–Quick-Step	23	53	+ 2h 37' 12"
124	Ethan Hayter	Great Britain	Soudal–Quick-Step	27	139	+ 5h 17' 18"
125	Valentin Paret-Peintre ‡	France	Soudal–Quick-Step	25	34	+ 1h 56' 41"
126	Fabio Van den Bossche	Belgium	Soudal–Quick-Step	25	127	+ 4h 32' 17"
127	Mauri Vansevenant	Belgium	Soudal–Quick-Step	27	55	+ 2h 38' 35"
128	Filippo Zana	Italy	Soudal–Quick-Step	27	18	+ 58' 44"
131	Magnus Cort	Denmark	Uno-X Mobility	33	106	+ 3h 58' 30"
132	Simon Dalby ‡	Denmark	Uno-X Mobility	23	82	+ 3h 16' 53"
133	Fredrik Dversnes Lavik	Norway	Uno-X Mobility	29	97	+ 3h 45' 26"
134	Tobias Halland Johannessen	Norway	Uno-X Mobility	26	26	+ 1h 26' 03"
135	Andreas Kron	Denmark	Uno-X Mobility	28	66	+ 2h 51' 03"
136	Andreas Leknessund	Norway	Uno-X Mobility	27	61	+ 2h 43' 07"
137	Rasmus Tiller	Norway	Uno-X Mobility	30	126	+ 4h 29' 51"
138	Martin Tjøtta ‡	Norway	Uno-X Mobility	25	109	+ 4h 00' 30"
141	Emanuel Buchmann	Germany	Cofidis	33	25	+ 1h 24' 50"
142	Bryan Coquard	France	Cofidis	34	117	+ 4h 15' 29"
143	Alex Kirsch	Luxembourg	Cofidis	34	DNF-3	–
144	Sylvain Moniquet	Belgium	Cofidis	28	95	+ 3h 43' 18"
145	Paul Ourselin	France	Cofidis	32	58	+ 2h 39' 35"
146	Alexis Renard	France	Cofidis	27	DNS-18	–
147	Louis Rouland ‡	France	Cofidis	23	134	+ 4h 55' 04"
148	Sergio Samitier	Spain	Cofidis	30	78	+ 3h 08' 26"
151	Alessandro Covi	Italy	Team Jayco–AlUla	27	125	+ 4h 29' 00"
152	Koen Bouwman	Netherlands	Team Jayco–AlUla	32	21	+ 1h 14' 26"
153	Paul Double	Great Britain	Team Jayco–AlUla	30	DNF-19	–
154	Asbjørn Hellemose	Denmark	Team Jayco–AlUla	27	138	+ 5h 13' 22"
155	Hamish McKenzie ‡	Australia	Team Jayco–AlUla	21	DNF-12	–
156	Finlay Pickering ‡	Great Britain	Team Jayco–AlUla	23	28	+ 1h 29' 10"
157	Rudy Porter	Australia	Team Jayco–AlUla	25	56	+ 2h 38' 50"
158	Jasha Sütterlin	Germany	Team Jayco–AlUla	33	124	+ 4h 26' 39"
161	Richard Carapaz	Ecuador	EF Education–EasyPost	33	4	+ 6' 54"
162	Vincenzo Albanese	Italy	EF Education–EasyPost	29	83	+ 3h 19' 12"
163	Markel Beloki ‡	Spain	EF Education–EasyPost	21	DNF-6	–
164	Alastair MacKellar ‡	Australia	EF Education–EasyPost	24	123	+ 4h 26' 34"
165	Darren Rafferty ‡	Ireland	EF Education–EasyPost	23	104	+ 3h 55' 15"
166	Juan Felipe Rodríguez ‡	Colombia	EF Education–EasyPost	22	16	+ 47' 56"
167	James Shaw	Great Britain	EF Education–EasyPost	30	64	+ 2h 46' 32"
168	Georg Steinhauser ‡	Germany	EF Education–EasyPost	24	118	+ 4h 16' 16"
171	Marco Brenner ‡	Germany	Tudor Pro Cycling Team	23	50	+ 2h 29' 27"
172	Will Barta	United States	Tudor Pro Cycling Team	30	54	+ 2h 37' 27"
173	Arthur Kluckers	Luxembourg	Tudor Pro Cycling Team	26	DNF-12	–
174	Stefan Küng	Switzerland	Tudor Pro Cycling Team	32	DNS-19	–
175	Roland Thalmann	Switzerland	Tudor Pro Cycling Team	33	86	+ 3h 22' 35"
176	Larry Warbasse	United States	Tudor Pro Cycling Team	36	41	+ 2h 10' 02"
177	Fabian Weiss ‡	Switzerland	Tudor Pro Cycling Team	24	72	+ 2h 59' 24"
178	Hannes Wilksch ‡	Germany	Tudor Pro Cycling Team	24	48	+ 2h 28' 27"
181	Harold Tejada	Colombia	XDS Astana Team	29	10	+ 12' 51"
182	Yevgeniy Fedorov	Kazakhstan	XDS Astana Team	26	DNS-19	–
183	Lorenzo Fortunato	Italy	XDS Astana Team	30	39	+ 2h 07' 42"
184	Victor Langellotti	Monaco	XDS Astana Team	31	DNF-9	–
185	Henok Mulubrhan	Eritrea	XDS Astana Team	26	43	+ 2h 14' 30"
186	Cristián Rodríguez	Spain	XDS Astana Team	31	9	+ 11' 59"
187	Alessandro Romele ‡	Italy	XDS Astana Team	22	92	+ 3h 31' 07"
188	Darren van Bekkum ‡	Netherlands	XDS Astana Team	24	111	+ 4h 01' 08"
191	Jesús Herrada	Spain	Burgos Burpellet BH	36	85	+ 3h 21' 29"
192	Clément Alleno	France	Burgos Burpellet BH	25	74	+ 3h 01' 55"
193	Mario Aparicio	Spain	Burgos Burpellet BH	26	14	+ 42' 17"
194	Sergio Chumil	Guatemala	Burgos Burpellet BH	25	DNF-2	–
195	José Manuel Díaz	Spain	Burgos Burpellet BH	31	31	+ 1h 44' 33"
196	José Luis Faura	Spain	Burgos Burpellet BH	25	77	+ 3h 05' 08"
197	Sinuhé Fernández	Spain	Burgos Burpellet BH	26	116	+ 4h 14' 13"
198	César Macías ‡	Mexico	Burgos Burpellet BH	22	133	+ 4h 48' 46"
201	Jarno Widar ‡	Belgium	Lotto–Intermarché	20	23	+ 1h 18' 52"
202	Vito Braet	Belgium	Lotto–Intermarché	25	132	+ 4h 48' 14"
203	Lars Craps ‡	Belgium	Lotto–Intermarché	24	89	+ 3h 29' 12"
204	Steffen De Schuyteneer ‡	Belgium	Lotto–Intermarché	21	135	+ 4h 56' 43"
205	Lorenzo Rota	Italy	Lotto–Intermarché	31	100	+ 3h 48' 44"
206	Reuben Thompson ‡	New Zealand	Lotto–Intermarché	25	57	+ 2h 38' 55"
207	Luca Van Boven	Belgium	Lotto–Intermarché	26	DNS-8	–
208	Roel van Sintmaartensdijk ‡	Netherlands	Lotto–Intermarché	25	DNF-5	–
211	Chris Hamilton	Australia	Team Picnic–PostNL	31	DNF-20	–
212	Timo de Jong	Netherlands	Team Picnic–PostNL	27	120	+ 4h 24' 01"
213	Mattia Gaffuri	Italy	Team Picnic–PostNL	27	DNF-8	–
214	Gijs Leemreize	Netherlands	Team Picnic–PostNL	26	27	+ 1h 26' 27"
215	Juan Guillermo Martínez ‡	Colombia	Team Picnic–PostNL	21	129	+ 4h 34' 08"
216	Oliver Peace ‡	Great Britain	Team Picnic–PostNL	21	DNF-14	–
217	Henri-François Renard-Haquin ‡	France	Team Picnic–PostNL	23	DNS-10	–
218	Timo Roosen	Netherlands	Team Picnic–PostNL	33	DNF-16	–
221	Urko Berrade	Spain	Equipo Kern Pharma	28	19	+ 1h 01' 09"
222	Marc Brustenga	Spain	Equipo Kern Pharma	26	136	+ 4h 58' 26"
223	Iván Cobo	Spain	Equipo Kern Pharma	26	113	+ 4h 08' 21"
224	Iñigo Elosegui	Spain	Equipo Kern Pharma	28	115	+ 4h 11' 57"
225	Ibon Ruiz	Spain	Equipo Kern Pharma	27	68	+ 2h 54' 03"
226	Iván Sosa	Colombia	Equipo Kern Pharma	28	87	+ 3h 24' 24"
227	Diego Uriarte ‡	Spain	Equipo Kern Pharma	24	DNF-8	–
228	Mats Wenzel ‡	Luxembourg	Equipo Kern Pharma	23	103	+ 3h 50' 54"

=== By team ===
(Germany) Red Bull–Bora–Hansgrohe (RBH)
No.	Rider	Pos.
1	Primož Roglič (SLO)	2
2	Finn Fisher-Black (NZL)	52
3	Jordi Meeus (BEL)	141
4	Gianni Moscon (ITA)	121
5	Callum Thornley (GBR)	128
6	Luke Tuckwell (AUS)	46
7	Gianni Vermeersch (BEL)	88
8	Frederik Wandahl (DEN)	96

(United Arab Emirates) UAE Team Emirates XRG (UEX)
No.	Rider	Pos.
11	Tadej Pogačar (SLO)	DNF-8
12	João Almeida (POR)	91
13	Domen Novak (SLO)	140
14	Ivo Oliveira (POR)	99
15	Pavel Sivakov (FRA)	DNF-13
16	Pablo Torres (ESP)	DNF-9
17	Kevin Vermaerke (USA)	29
18	Jay Vine (AUS)	DNF-12

(Spain) Movistar Team (MOV)
No.	Rider	Pos.
21	Enric Mas (ESP)	1
22	Jorge Arcas (ESP)	110
23	Orluis Aular (VEN)	122
24	Carlos Canal (ESP)	90
25	Pablo Castrillo (ESP)	81
26	Raúl García Pierna (ESP)	22
27	Iván Romeo (ESP)	73
28	Cian Uijtdebroeks (BEL)	DNS-5

(Netherlands) Visma–Lease a Bike (TVL)
No.	Rider	Pos.
31	Wout van Aert (BEL)	44
32	Bruno Armirail (FRA)	60
33	Matthew Brennan (GBR)	108
34	Steven Kruijswijk (NED)	79
35	Sepp Kuss (USA)	5
36	Christophe Laporte (FRA)	DNF-14
37	Jørgen Nordhagen (NOR)	37
38	Ben Tulett (GBR)	DNS-12

(France) Decathlon CMA CGM (DCT)
No.	Rider	Pos.
41	Felix Gall (AUT)	3
42	Léo Bisiaux (FRA)	12
43	Oscar Chamberlain (AUS)	114
44	Sander De Pestel (BEL)	80
45	Jordan Labrosse (FRA)	DNF-14
46	Gregor Mühlberger (AUT)	DNF-13
47	Matthew Riccitello (USA)	DNF-20
48	Callum Scotson (AUS)	38

(Switzerland) Pinarello–Q36.5 Pro Cycling Team (PQT)
No.	Rider	Pos.
51	David de la Cruz (ESP)	105
52	Xabier Mikel Azparren (ESP)	101
53	Walter Calzoni (ITA)	70
54	Marcel Camprubí (ESP)	65
55	Eddie Dunbar (IRL)	DNF-20
56	Thomas Gloag (GBR)	67
57	David González (ESP)	DNS-12
58	Milan Vader (NED)	47

(United Kingdom) Netcompany INEOS (NCI)
No.	Rider	Pos.
61	Oscar Onley (GBR)	6
62	Jack Haig (AUS)	24
63	Lucas Hamilton (AUS)	84
64	Axel Laurance (FRA)	63
65	Carlos Rodríguez (ESP)	36
66	Embret Svestad-Bårdseng (NOR)	20
67	Joshua Tarling (GBR)	DNF-6
68	Ben Turner (GBR)	DNF-10

Team Bahrain Victorious (TBV)
No.	Rider	Pos.
71	Pello Bilbao (ESP)	33
72	Santiago Buitrago (COL)	17
73	Roman Ermakov (SLO)	119
74	Matevž Govekar (SLO)	137
75	Pau Miquel (ESP)	42
76	Jakob Omrzel (SLO)	7
77	Mathijs Paasschens (NED)	102
78	Attila Valter (HUN)	45

(Germany) Lidl–Trek (LTK)
No.	Rider	Pos.
81	Mattias Skjelmose (DEN)	13
82	Julien Bernard (FRA)	49
83	Lennard Kämna (GER)	71
84	Patrick Konrad (AUT)	40
85	Jacopo Mosca (ITA)	93
86	Mathias Sunekær Norsgaard (DEN)	142
87	Thibau Nys (BEL)	112
88	Mads Pedersen (DEN)	DNS-11

(France) Groupama–FDJ United (GFC)
No.	Rider	Pos.
91	Clément Berthet (FRA)	8
92	Olivier Le Gac (FRA)	131
93	Valentin Madouas (FRA)	35
94	Guillaume Martin (FRA)	11
95	Rudy Molard (FRA)	51
96	Enzo Paleni (FRA)	62
97	Rémy Rochas (FRA)	69
98	Bastien Tronchon (FRA)	75

(Belgium) Alpecin–Premier Tech (APT)
No.	Rider	Pos.
101	Kaden Groves (AUS)	DNF-9
102	Francesco Busatto (ITA)	DNF-13
103	Lindsay De Vylder (BEL)	DNS-12
104	Ramses Debruyne (BEL)	32
105	Gal Glivar (SLO)	98
106	Michael Gogl (AUT)	94
107	Hugo Houle (CAN)	DNF-14
108	Sente Sentjens (BEL)	DNF-13

(Switzerland) NSN Cycling Team (NSN)
No.	Rider	Pos.
111	Alexey Lutsenko (KAZ)	DNS-13
112	George Bennett (NZL)	DNS-10
113	Jan Hirt (CZE)	15
114	Hugo Hofstetter (FRA)	76
115	Moritz Kretschy (GER)	DNS-14
116	Pau Martí (ESP)	59
117	Nick Schultz (AUS)	107
118	Floris Van Tricht (BEL)	DNF-8

(Belgium) Soudal–Quick-Step (SOQ)
No.	Rider	Pos.
121	Mikel Landa (ESP)	30
122	Alberto Dainese (ITA)	130
123	Gianmarco Garofoli (ITA)	53
124	Ethan Hayter (GBR)	139
125	Valentin Paret-Peintre (FRA)	34
126	Fabio Van den Bossche (BEL)	127
127	Mauri Vansevenant (BEL)	55
128	Filippo Zana (ITA)	18

(Norway) Uno-X Mobility (UXM)
No.	Rider	Pos.
131	Magnus Cort (DEN)	106
132	Simon Dalby (DEN)	82
133	Fredrik Dversnes Lavik (NOR)	97
134	Tobias Halland Johannessen (NOR)	26
135	Andreas Kron (DEN)	66
136	Andreas Leknessund (NOR)	61
137	Rasmus Tiller (NOR)	126
138	Martin Tjøtta (NOR)	109

(France) Cofidis (COF)
No.	Rider	Pos.
141	Emanuel Buchmann (GER)	25
142	Bryan Coquard (FRA)	117
143	Alex Kirsch (LUX)	DNF-3
144	Sylvain Moniquet (BEL)	95
145	Paul Ourselin (FRA)	58
146	Alexis Renard (FRA)	DNS-18
147	Louis Rouland (FRA)	134
148	Sergio Samitier (ESP)	78

(Australia) Team Jayco–AlUla (JAY)
No.	Rider	Pos.
151	Alessandro Covi (ITA)	125
152	Koen Bouwman (NED)	21
153	Paul Double (GBR)	DNF-19
154	Asbjørn Hellemose (DEN)	138
155	Hamish McKenzie (AUS)	DNF-12
156	Finlay Pickering (GBR)	28
157	Rudy Porter (AUS)	56
158	Jasha Sütterlin (GER)	124

(United States) EF Education–EasyPost (EFE)
No.	Rider	Pos.
161	Richard Carapaz (ECU)	4
162	Vincenzo Albanese (ITA)	83
163	Markel Beloki (ESP)	DNF-6
164	Alastair MacKellar (AUS)	123
165	Darren Rafferty (IRL)	104
166	Juan Felipe Rodríguez (COL)	16
167	James Shaw (GBR)	64
168	Georg Steinhauser (GER)	118

(Switzerland) Tudor Pro Cycling Team (TUD)
No.	Rider	Pos.
171	Marco Brenner (GER)	50
172	Will Barta (USA)	54
173	Arthur Kluckers (LUX)	DNF-12
174	Stefan Küng (SUI)	DNS-19
175	Roland Thalmann (SUI)	86
176	Larry Warbasse (USA)	41
177	Fabian Weiss (SUI)	72
178	Hannes Wilksch (GER)	48

(Kazakhstan) XDS Astana Team (XAT)
No.	Rider	Pos.
181	Harold Tejada (COL)	10
182	Yevgeniy Fedorov (KAZ)	DNS-19
183	Lorenzo Fortunato (ITA)	39
184	Victor Langellotti (MON)	DNF-9
185	Henok Mulubrhan (ERI)	43
186	Cristián Rodríguez (ESP)	9
187	Alessandro Romele (ITA)	92
188	Darren van Bekkum (NED)	111

(Spain) Burgos Burpellet BH (BBH)
No.	Rider	Pos.
191	Jesús Herrada (ESP)	85
192	Clément Alleno (FRA)	74
193	Mario Aparicio (ESP)	14
194	Sergio Chumil (GUA)	DNF-2
195	José Manuel Díaz (ESP)	31
196	José Luis Faura (ESP)	77
197	Sinuhé Fernández (ESP)	116
198	César Macías (MEX)	133

(Belgium) Lotto–Intermarché (LOI)
No.	Rider	Pos.
201	Jarno Widar (BEL)	23
202	Vito Braet (BEL)	132
203	Lars Craps (BEL)	89
204	Steffen De Schuyteneer (BEL)	135
205	Lorenzo Rota (ITA)	100
206	Reuben Thompson (NZL)	57
207	Luca Van Boven (BEL)	DNS-8
208	Roel van Sintmaartensdijk (NED)	DNF-5

(Netherlands) Team Picnic–PostNL (TPP)
No.	Rider	Pos.
211	Chris Hamilton (AUS)	DNF-20
212	Timo de Jong (NED)	120
213	Mattia Gaffuri (ITA)	DNF-8
214	Gijs Leemreize (NED)	27
215	Juan Guillermo Martínez (COL)	129
216	Oliver Peace (GBR)	DNF-14
217	Henri-François Renard-Haquin (FRA)	DNS-10
218	Timo Roosen (NED)	DNF-16

(Spain) Equipo Kern Pharma (EKP)
No.	Rider	Pos.
221	Urko Berrade (ESP)	19
222	Marc Brustenga (ESP)	136
223	Iván Cobo (ESP)	113
224	Iñigo Elosegui (ESP)	115
225	Ibon Ruiz (ESP)	68
226	Iván Sosa (COL)	87
227	Diego Uriarte (ESP)	DNF-8
228	Mats Wenzel (LUX)	103

=== By nationality ===
Country	No. of riders	Finished	Stage wins
Australia	12	8	
Austria	4	3	
Belgium	18	13	2 (Wout van Aert x2)
Canada	1	0	
Colombia	5	5	
Czechia	1	1	
Denmark	8	7	
Ecuador	1	1	
Eritrea	1	1	
France	23	18	2 (Bryan Coquard, Bastien Tronchon)
Germany	7	6	1 (Marco Brenner)
Great Britain	12	7	5 (Matthew Brennan x5)
Guatemala	1	0	
Hungary	1	1	
Ireland	2	1	1 (Eddie Dunbar)
Italy	13	11	
Kazakhstan	2	0	
Luxembourg	3	1	
Mexico	1	1	
Monaco	1	0	
Netherlands	9	7	
New Zealand	3	2	
Norway	7	7	2 (Tobias Halland Johannessen, Andreas Leknessund)
Portugal	2	2	
Slovenia	7	6	4 (Jakob Omrzel, Tadej Pogačar x3)
Spain	30	26	2 (Mikel Landa, Enric Mas)
Switzerland	3	2	1 (Stefan Küng)
United States	5	4	
Venezuela	1	1	
Total	184	142	20
