= 2026 Figueira Champions Classic =

2026 UCI ProSeries

Race details
- Dates: 14 February 2026
- Stages: 1
- Distance: 177.8 km (110.5 mi)
- Winning time: 4h 19' 13"

Results
	Winner	António Morgado (POR)	(UAE Team Emirates XRG)
	Second	Alex Aranburu (ESP)	(Cofidis)
	Third	Pau Martí (ESP)	(NSN Cycling Team)

The 2026 Figueira Champions Classic was the 4th edition of the Figueira Champions Classic single-day cycling race. It was held on 14 February 2026 over a distance of 177.8 km, starting and ending in Figueira da Foz.

== Teams ==
Eight UCI WorldTeams, seven UCI ProTeams, and nine UCI Continental teams made up the twenty-four teams that participated in the race.

UCI WorldTeams

- EF Education–EasyPost
- Lidl–Trek
- Lotto–Intermarché
- Movistar Team
- NSN Cycling Team
- Red Bull–Bora–Hansgrohe
- Team Picnic–PostNL
- UAE Team Emirates XRG

UCI ProTeams

- Caja Rural–Seguros RGA
- Cofidis
- Equipo Kern Pharma
- Euskaltel–Euskadi
- Pinarello–Q36.5 Pro Cycling Team
- Team TotalEnergies
- Tudor Pro Cycling Team

UCI Continental teams

- Aviludo–Louletano–Loulé
- Credibom / LA Alumínios / Marcos Car
- Efapel Cycling
- Feira dos Sofás–Boavista
- Feirense–Beeceler
- GI Group Holding–Simoldes–UDO
- Tavfer–Ovos Matinados–Mortágua
- Team Tavira

== Results ==
Result
Rank	Rider	Team	Time
1	António Morgado (POR)	UAE Team Emirates XRG	4h 19' 13"
2	Alex Aranburu (ESP)	Cofidis	+ 0"
3	Pau Martí (ESP)	NSN Cycling Team	+ 9"
4	Jarno Widar (BEL)	Lotto–Intermarché	+ 10"
5	Ion Izagirre (ESP)	Cofidis	+ 10"
6	Brandon McNulty (USA)	UAE Team Emirates XRG	+ 10"
7	Marc Hirschi (SUI)	Tudor Pro Cycling Team	+ 21"
8	Felix Großschartner (AUT)	UAE Team Emirates XRG	+ 21"
9	Daniel Martínez (COL)	Red Bull–Bora–Hansgrohe	+ 21"
10	Thomas Gloag (GBR)	Pinarello–Q36.5 Pro Cycling Team	+ 21"
