= 2026 Veneto Classic =

2026 UCI ProSeries

Race details
- Dates: 18 October 2026
- Stages: 1
- Distance: 157.6 km (97.9 mi)
- Winning time: 3h 32' 57"

Results
	Winner	Brandon McNulty (USA)	(UAE Team Emirates XRG)
	Second	Anthon Charmig (DEN)	(Uno-X Mobility)
	Third	Pavel Sivakov (FRA)	(UAE Team Emirates XRG)

The 2026 Veneto Classic was the 6th edition of the Veneto Classic single-day cycling race. It was held on 18 October 2026 as part of the 2026 UCI ProSeries calendar.

== Teams ==
Seven UCI WorldTeams, nine UCI ProTeams, and five UCI Continental teams made up the twenty-one teams that participated in the race.

UCI WorldTeams

- Groupama–FDJ United
- Movistar Team
- NSN Cycling Team
- Team Jayco–AlUla
- UAE Team Emirates XRG
- Uno-X Mobility
- XDS Astana Team

UCI ProTeams

- Bardiani–CSF 7 Saber
- Caja Rural–Seguros RGA
- Cofidis
- Euskaltel–Euskadi
- MBH Bank CSB Telecom Fort
- Pinarello–Q36.5 Pro Cycling Team
- Solution Tech NIPPO Rali
- Team Polti VisitMalta
- Tudor Pro Cycling Team

UCI Continental Teams

- Biesse–Carrera–Premac
- Campana Imballaggi–Morbiato–Trentino
- General Store–Essegibi–Fratelli Curia
- S.C. Padovani Polo Cherry Bank
- Swatt Club

== Results ==
Result
Rank	Rider	Team	Time
1	Brandon McNulty (USA)	UAE Team Emirates XRG	3h 32' 57"
2	Anthon Charmig (DEN)	Uno-X Mobility	+ 1' 06"
3	Pavel Sivakov (FRA)	UAE Team Emirates XRG	+ 1' 32"
4	Clément Berthet (FRA)	Groupama–FDJ United	+ 1' 53"
5	Marc Hirschi (SUI)	Tudor Pro Cycling Team	+ 2' 02"
6	Christian Scaroni (ITA)	XDS Astana Team	+ 2' 09"
7	Quinten Hermans (BEL)	Pinarello–Q36.5 Pro Cycling Team	+ 2' 10"
8	Marcel Camprubí (ESP)	Pinarello–Q36.5 Pro Cycling Team	+ 2' 20"
9	Diego Ulissi (ITA)	XDS Astana Team	+ 2' 20"
10	Benoît Cosnefroy (FRA)	UAE Team Emirates XRG	+ 2' 20"
