= NSN Development Team =

Swiss cycling team

Team information
- UCI code: ISA (2020); ICA (2021–2025); NDT (2026–)
- Registered: Israel (2021–2025); Switzerland (2026–)
- Founded: 2020
- Discipline: Road
- Status: UCI Continental

Key personnel
- General manager: Kjell Carlström
- Team manager: Tim Elverson

Team name history
- 2020–2022 2023–2025 2026–: Israel Cycling Academy; Israel Premier Tech Academy; NSN Development Team

NSN Development Team is a Swiss UCI Continental team founded in 2020 that acts as a development team for UCI WorldTeam NSN Cycling Team.

== Team roster ==
As of 1 July 2025.

Rider	Date of birth
Dylan Bibic (CAN)	3 August 2003 (age 23)
Patrick Casey (IRL)	21 March 2006 (age 20)
Samuel Coleman (IRL)	15 January 2006 (age 20)
Roei Edinger (ISR)	9 May 2006 (age 20)
Emry Faingezicht (ISR)	11 February 2003 (age 23)
Álvaro García (ESP)	6 April 2005 (age 21)
Brady Gilmore (AUS)	14 April 2001 (age 25)
Moritz Kretschy (GER)	12 May 2002 (age 24)
Karl Kurits (EST)	14 June 2005 (age 21)
Daniel Lima (POR)	12 December 2004 (age 21)

Rider	Date of birth
Pau Martí (ESP)	24 November 2004 (age 21)
Viggo Moore (USA)	8 May 2004 (age 22)
Matar Peretz Hardeball (ISR)	6 October 2005 (age 20)
Finlay Tarling (GBR)	2 October 2006 (age 19)
Rotem Tene (ISR)	30 March 2001 (age 25)
Luke Valenti (CAN)	5 June 2004 (age 22)
Floris Van Tricht (BEL)	23 June 2001 (age 25)
Jens Verbrugghe (BEL)	23 September 2004 (age 21)
Kiaan Watts (NZL)	27 July 2001 (age 25)
Euan Woodliffe (GBR)	18 January 2004 (age 22)

== Major results ==
2020
Stage 1 Course de Solidarność et des Champions Olympiques, Itamar Einhorn
Israel National Under-23 Road Race, Omer Lahav
2021
Israel National Under-23 Time Trial, Oded Kogut
Israel National Under-23 Road Race, Oded Kogut
Stage 2 Troféu Joaquim Agostinho, Alastair Mackellar
Stage 5 Volta a Portugal, Mason Hollyman
2022
Stage 4 Circuit des Ardennes, Marco Frigo
Stage 5 Alpes Isère Tour, Sebastian Berwick
Stage 4 Giro d'Italia Giovani Under 23, Riley Pickrell
Canada National Time Trial, Derek Gee
Israel National Under-23 Time Trial, Roi Weinberg
Stage 1 Giro della Valle d'Aosta, Mason Hollyman
2023
Australia National Under-23 Time Trial, Alastair Mackellar
Australia National Under-23 Road Race, Alastair Mackellar
United States National Under-23 Time Trial, Viggo Moore
Israel National Time Trial, Oded Kogut
Israel National Under-23 Road Race, Jonathan Abudraham
Overall Tour Alsace, Sebastian Berwick

Stage 3, Sebastian Berwick

2024
Overall Circuit des Ardennes, Joseph Blackmore

Stage 4, Joseph Blackmore

Liège–Bastogne–Liège Espoirs, Joseph Blackmore
Israel National Under-23 Time Trial, Emry Faingezicht
Canada National Time Trial, Pier-André Côté
Israel National Under-23 Road Race, Matar Peretz Hardeball
Midden-Brabant Poort Omloop, Floris Van Tricht
2025
Overall Circuit des Ardennes, Brady Gilmore

Stage 4, Brady Gilmore

Stage 1 Alpes Isère Tour, Viggo Moore
Stages 2 & 4 Alpes Isère Tour, Moritz Kretschy
2026
1st Overall Tour du Rwanda, Moritz Kretschy

== National champions ==
2020
Israel U23 Road Race, Omer Lahav
2021
Israel U23 Time Trial, Oded Kogut
Israel U23 Road Race, Oded Kogut
2022
Canada Time Trial, Derek Gee
Israel U23 Time Trial, Roi Weinberg
2023
Australia U23 Time Trial, Alastair Mackellar
Australia U23 Road Race, Alastair Mackellar
United States U23 Time Trial, Viggo Moore
Israel Time Trial, Oded Kogut
Israel U23 Road Race, Jonathan Abudraham
2024
Israel U23 Time Trial, Emry Faingezicht
Canada Time Trial, Pier-André Côté
Israel U23 Road Race, Matar Peretz Hardeball
