= 2023 Volta a la Comunitat Valenciana =

2023 UCI ProSeries

Race details
- Dates: 1–5 February 2023
- Stages: 5
- Distance: 779 km (484.0 mi)
- Winning time: 19h 10' 06"

Results
Jersey awarded to the overall winner	Winner	Rui Costa (POR)	(Intermarché–Circus–Wanty)
	Second	Giulio Ciccone (ITA)	(Trek–Segafredo)
	Third	Tao Geoghegan Hart (GBR)	(Ineos Grenadiers)
Jersey awarded to the points classification winner	Points	Giulio Ciccone (ITA)	(Trek–Segafredo)
Jersey awarded to the mountains classification winner	Mountains	Samuele Zoccarato (ITA)	(Green Project–Bardiani–CSF–Faizanè)
Jersey awarded to the youth classification winner	Youth	Thomas Gloag (GBR)	(Team Jumbo–Visma)
	Team	(United Arab Emirates) UAE Team Emirates	

The 2023 Volta a la Comunitat Valenciana (English: Tour of the Valencian Community) was a road cycling stage race that took place from 1 to 5 February 2023 in the Spanish autonomous community of Valencia. The race was rated as a category 2.Pro event on the 2023 UCI ProSeries calendars, and was the 74th edition of the Volta a la Comunitat Valenciana.

== Teams ==
Ten of the eighteen UCI WorldTeams and nine UCI ProTeams made up the nineteen teams that took part in the race. All but one team entered a full squad of seven riders; Trek–Segafredo only entered five riders. In total, 130 riders started the race, as Mikkel Bjerg of UAE Team Emirates did not start the first stage.

UCI WorldTeams

- Astana Qazaqstan Team
- Bora–Hansgrohe
- Team Bahrain Victorious
- Ineos Grenadiers
- Intermarché–Circus–Wanty
- Movistar Team
- Team Jayco–AlUla
- Team Jumbo–Visma
- Trek–Segafredo
- UAE Team Emirates

UCI ProTeams

- Burgos BH
- Caja Rural–Seguros RGA
- Equipo Kern Pharma
- Euskaltel–Euskadi
- Green Project–Bardiani–CSF–Faizanè
- Human Powered Health
- Q36.5 Pro Cycling Team
- Team Flanders–Baloise
- Uno-X Pro Cycling Team

== Route ==
Stage characteristics and winners
Stage	Date	Course	Distance	Type	Stage winner
1	1 February	Orihuela to Altea	189.4 km (117.7 mi)	Hilly stage	Biniam Girmay (ERI)
2	2 February	Novelda to Alto del Pino	178.2 km (110.7 mi)	Mountain stage	Giulio Ciccone (ITA)
3	3 February	Bétera to Sagonte	145.1 km (90.2 mi)	Hilly stage	Simone Velasco (ITA)
4	4 February	Burriana to Alto de la Cueva Santa	181.6 km (112.8 mi)	Mountain stage	Tao Geoghegan Hart (GBR)
5	5 February	Paterna to Valencia	93.2 km (57.9 mi)	Hilly stage	Rui Costa (POR)
Total			787.5 km (489.3 mi)		

== Stages ==
=== Stage 1 ===
1 February 2022 — Orihuela to Altea, 89.4 km (55.6 mi)

Stage 1 Result (1–10)
Rank	Rider	Team	Time
1	Biniam Girmay (ERI)	Intermarché–Circus–Wanty	4h 38' 11"
2	Olav Kooij (NED)	Team Jumbo–Visma	+ 0"
3	Iván García Cortina (ESP)	Movistar Team	+ 0"
4	José Joaquín Rojas (ESP)	Movistar Team	+ 0"
5	Alex Aranburu (ESP)	Movistar Team	+ 0"
6	Antonio Jesús Soto (ESP)	Euskaltel–Euskadi	+ 0"
7	Samuele Battistella (ITA)	Astana Qazaqstan Team	+ 0"
8	Fernando Barceló (ESP)	Caja Rural–Seguros RGA	+ 0"
9	Louis Bendixen (DEN)	Uno-X Pro Cycling Team	+ 0"
10	Giulio Ciccone (ITA)	Trek–Segafredo	+ 0"

General classification after Stage 1 (1–10)
Rank	Rider	Team	Time
1	Biniam Girmay (ERI)	Intermarché–Circus–Wanty	4h 38' 01"
2	Olav Kooij (NED)	Team Jumbo–Visma	+ 4"
3	Iván García Cortina (ESP)	Movistar Team	+ 6"
4	José Joaquín Rojas (ESP)	Movistar Team	+ 10"
5	Alex Aranburu (ESP)	Movistar Team	+ 10"
6	Antonio Jesús Soto (ESP)	Euskaltel–Euskadi	+ 10"
7	Samuele Battistella (ITA)	Astana Qazaqstan Team	+ 10"
8	Fernando Barceló (ESP)	Caja Rural–Seguros RGA	+ 10"
9	Louis Bendixen (DEN)	Uno-X Pro Cycling Team	+ 10"
10	Giulio Ciccone (ITA)	Trek–Segafredo	+ 10"

=== Stage 2 ===
2 February 2022 — Novelda to Alto del Pino, 178.2 km (110.7 mi)

Stage 2 Result (1–10)
Rank	Rider	Team	Time
1	Giulio Ciccone (ITA)	Trek–Segafredo	4h 38' 59"
2	Pello Bilbao (ESP)	Team Bahrain Victorious	+ 0"
3	Aleksandr Vlasov	Bora–Hansgrohe	+ 0"
4	Mikel Landa (ESP)	Team Bahrain Victorious	+ 0"
5	Rui Costa (POR)	Intermarché–Circus–Wanty	+ 0"
6	Anthon Charmig (DEN)	Uno-X Pro Cycling Team	+ 0"
7	Alex Aranburu (ESP)	Movistar Team	+ 0"
8	Thomas Gloag (GBR)	Team Jumbo–Visma	+ 0"
9	Tao Geoghegan Hart (GBR)	Ineos Grenadiers	+ 0"
10	Carlos Rodríguez (ESP)	Ineos Grenadiers	+ 6"

General classification after Stage 2 (1–10)
Rank	Rider	Team	Time
1	Giulio Ciccone (ITA)	Trek–Segafredo	9h 17' 00"
2	Pello Bilbao (ESP)	Team Bahrain Victorious	+ 3"
3	Aleksandr Vlasov	Bora–Hansgrohe	+ 6"
4	Alex Aranburu (ESP)	Movistar Team	+ 10"
5	Anthon Charmig (DEN)	Uno-X Pro Cycling Team	+ 10"
6	Thomas Gloag (GBR)	Team Jumbo–Visma	+ 10"
7	Rui Costa (POR)	Intermarché–Circus–Wanty	+ 10"
8	Tao Geoghegan Hart (GBR)	Ineos Grenadiers	+ 10"
9	Mikel Landa (ESP)	Team Bahrain Victorious	+ 10"
10	Carlos Rodríguez (ESP)	Ineos Grenadiers	+ 16"

=== Stage 3 ===
3 February 2022 — Bétera to Sagonte, 145.1 km (90.2 mi)

Stage 3 Result (1–10)
Rank	Rider	Team	Time
1	Simone Velasco (ITA)	Astana Qazaqstan Team	3h 13' 47"
2	Bob Jungels (LUX)	Bora–Hansgrohe	+ 0"
3	Jonas Gregaard (DEN)	Uno-X Pro Cycling Team	+ 0"
4	Alex Aranburu (ESP)	Movistar Team	+ 3"
5	José Joaquín Rojas (ESP)	Movistar Team	+ 3"
6	Fred Wright (GBR)	Team Bahrain Victorious	+ 3"
7	Koen Bouwman (NED)	Team Jumbo–Visma	+ 3"
8	Rui Costa (POR)	Intermarché–Circus–Wanty	+ 3"
9	Pello Bilbao (ESP)	Team Bahrain Victorious	+ 3"
10	Brandon McNulty (USA)	UAE Team Emirates	+ 3"

General classification after Stage 3 (1–10)
Rank	Rider	Team	Time
1	Giulio Ciccone (ITA)	Trek–Segafredo	12h 30' 50"
2	Pello Bilbao (ESP)	Team Bahrain Victorious	+ 3"
3	Aleksandr Vlasov	Bora–Hansgrohe	+ 6"
4	Alex Aranburu (ESP)	Movistar Team	+ 10"
5	Anthon Charmig (DEN)	Uno-X Pro Cycling Team	+ 10"
6	Thomas Gloag (GBR)	Team Jumbo–Visma	+ 10"
7	Rui Costa (POR)	Intermarché–Circus–Wanty	+ 10"
8	Tao Geoghegan Hart (GBR)	Ineos Grenadiers	+ 10"
9	Carlos Rodríguez (ESP)	Ineos Grenadiers	+ 16"
10	Brandon McNulty (USA)	UAE Team Emirates	+ 18"

=== Stage 4 ===
4 February 2022 — Burriana to Alto de la Cueva Santa, 181.6 km (112.8 mi)

Stage 4 Result (1–10)
Rank	Rider	Team	Time
1	Tao Geoghegan Hart (GBR)	Ineos Grenadiers	4h 32' 00"
2	Thomas Gloag (GBR)	Team Jumbo–Visma	+ 0"
3	Giulio Ciccone (ITA)	Trek–Segafredo	+ 0"
4	Aleksandr Vlasov	Bora–Hansgrohe	+ 0"
5	Mikel Landa (ESP)	Team Bahrain Victorious	+ 0"
6	Pello Bilbao (ESP)	Team Bahrain Victorious	+ 0"
7	Rui Costa (POR)	Intermarché–Circus–Wanty	+ 0"
8	Carlos Rodríguez (ESP)	Ineos Grenadiers	+ 0"
9	Diego Ulissi (ITA)	UAE Team Emirates	+ 0"
10	Brandon McNulty (USA)	UAE Team Emirates	+ 6"

General classification after Stage 4 (1–10)
Rank	Rider	Team	Time
1	Giulio Ciccone (ITA)	Trek–Segafredo	17h 02' 46"
2	Tao Geoghegan Hart (GBR)	Ineos Grenadiers	+ 4"
3	Pello Bilbao (ESP)	Team Bahrain Victorious	+ 7"
4	Aleksandr Vlasov	Bora–Hansgrohe	+ 8"
5	Thomas Gloag (GBR)	Team Jumbo–Visma	+ 8"
6	Rui Costa (POR)	Intermarché–Circus–Wanty	+ 14"
7	Mikel Landa (ESP)	Team Bahrain Victorious	+ 14"
8	Alex Aranburu (ESP)	Movistar Team	+ 20"
9	Anthon Charmig (DEN)	Uno-X Pro Cycling Team	+ 20"
10	Carlos Rodríguez (ESP)	Ineos Grenadiers	+ 20"

=== Stage 5 ===
5 February 2022 — Paterna to Valencia, 93.2 km (57.9 mi)

Stage 5 Result (1–10)
Rank	Rider	Team	Time
1	Rui Costa (POR)	Intermarché–Circus–Wanty	2h 07' 16"
2	Thymen Arensman (NED)	Ineos Grenadiers	+ 0"
3	Samuele Battistella (ITA)	Astana Qazaqstan Team	+ 7"
4	Marc Soler (ESP)	UAE Team Emirates	+ 7"
5	Giulio Ciccone (ITA)	Trek–Segafredo	+ 21"
6	Pello Bilbao (ESP)	Team Bahrain Victorious	+ 23"
7	Brandon McNulty (USA)	UAE Team Emirates	+ 28"
8	Fred Wright (GBR)	Team Bahrain Victorious	+ 30"
9	Matej Mohorič (SLO)	Team Bahrain Victorious	+ 30"
10	Omar Fraile (ESP)	Ineos Grenadiers	+ 30"

General classification after Stage 5 (1–10)
Rank	Rider	Team	Time
1	Rui Costa (POR)	Intermarché–Circus–Wanty	19h 10' 06"
2	Giulio Ciccone (ITA)	Trek–Segafredo	+ 16"
3	Tao Geoghegan Hart (GBR)	Ineos Grenadiers	+ 19"
4	Pello Bilbao (ESP)	Team Bahrain Victorious	+ 21"
5	Aleksandr Vlasov	Bora–Hansgrohe	+ 25"
6	Thomas Gloag (GBR)	Team Jumbo–Visma	+ 34"
7	Mikel Landa (ESP)	Team Bahrain Victorious	+ 40"
8	Brandon McNulty (USA)	UAE Team Emirates	+ 45"
9	Alex Aranburu (ESP)	Movistar Team	+ 46"
10	Carlos Rodríguez (ESP)	Ineos Grenadiers	+ 46"

== Classification leadership table ==
Classification leadership by stage
Stage	Winner	General classification	Points classification	Mountains classification	Young rider classification	Team classification
1	Biniam Girmay	Biniam Girmay	Biniam Girmay	Marc Soler	Biniam Girmay	Movistar Team
2	Giulio Ciccone	Giulio Ciccone	Giulio Ciccone	Samuele Zoccarato	Anthon Charmig	UAE Team Emirates
3	Simone Velasco	Giulio Ciccone	Alex Aranburu	Samuele Zoccarato	Anthon Charmig	UAE Team Emirates
4	Tao Geoghegan Hart	Giulio Ciccone	Giulio Ciccone	Samuele Zoccarato	Thomas Gloag	UAE Team Emirates
5	Rui Costa	Rui Costa	Giulio Ciccone	Samuele Zoccarato	Thomas Gloag	UAE Team Emirates
Final		Rui Costa	Giulio Ciccone	Samuele Zoccarato	Thomas Gloag	UAE Team Emirates

- On stage 2, Olav Kooij, who was second in the points classification, wore the orange jersey, because first-placed Biniam Girmay wore the yellow jersey as the leader of the general classification. For the same reason, Samuele Battistella, who was third in the young rider classification behind Girmay and Kooij, wore the white jersey.

== Current classification standings ==
Legend
Denotes the winner of the general classification	Denotes the winner of the mountains classification
Denotes the winner of the points classification	Denotes the winner of the young rider classification

=== General classification ===
Final general classification (1–10)
Rank	Rider	Team	Time
1	Rui Costa (POR)	Intermarché–Circus–Wanty	19h 10' 06"
2	Giulio Ciccone (ITA)	Trek–Segafredo	+ 16"
3	Tao Geoghegan Hart (GBR)	Ineos Grenadiers	+ 19"
4	Pello Bilbao (ESP)	Team Bahrain Victorious	+ 21"
5	Aleksandr Vlasov	Bora–Hansgrohe	+ 25"
6	Thomas Gloag (GBR)	Team Jumbo–Visma	+ 34"
7	Mikel Landa (ESP)	Team Bahrain Victorious	+ 40"
8	Brandon McNulty (USA)	UAE Team Emirates	+ 45"
9	Alex Aranburu (ESP)	Movistar Team	+ 46"
10	Carlos Rodríguez (ESP)	Ineos Grenadiers	+ 46"

=== Points classification ===
Final points classification (1–10)
Rank	Rider	Team	Time
1	Giulio Ciccone (ITA)	Trek–Segafredo	60
2	Rui Costa (POR)	Intermarché–Circus–Wanty	54
3	Pello Bilbao (ESP)	Team Bahrain Victorious	52
4	Alex Aranburu (ESP)	Movistar Team	42
5	Aleksandr Vlasov	Bora–Hansgrohe	34
6	Thomas Gloag (GBR)	Team Jumbo–Visma	29
7	Tao Geoghegan Hart (GBR)	Ineos Grenadiers	27
8	Mikel Landa (ESP)	Team Bahrain Victorious	26
9	Brandon McNulty (USA)	UAE Team Emirates	26
10	José Joaquín Rojas (ESP)	Movistar Team	26

=== Mountains classification ===
Final mountains classification (1–10)
Rank	Rider	Team	Time
1	Samuele Zoccarato (ITA)	Green Project–Bardiani–CSF–Faizanè	40
2	Javier Romo (ESP)	Astana Qazaqstan Team	17
3	Giulio Ciccone (ITA)	Trek–Segafredo	16
4	Mulu Hailemichael (ERI)	Caja Rural–Seguros RGA	16
5	Alessandro De Marchi (ITA)	Team Jayco–AlUla	15
6	Aleksandr Vlasov	Bora–Hansgrohe	14
7	Tao Geoghegan Hart (GBR)	Ineos Grenadiers	12
8	Lawson Craddock (USA)	Team Jayco–AlUla	11
9	Joan Bou (ESP)	Euskaltel–Euskadi	10
10	Simone Velasco (ITA)	Astana Qazaqstan Team	10

=== Young rider classification ===
Final young rider classification (1–10)
Rank	Rider	Team	Time
1	Thomas Gloag (GBR)	Team Jumbo–Visma	19h 10' 40"
2	Brandon McNulty (USA)	UAE Team Emirates	+ 11"
3	Carlos Rodriguez (ESP)	Ineos Grenadiers	+ 12"
4	Anthon Charmig (DEN)	Uno-X Pro Cycling Team	+ 1' 54"
5	Thymen Arensman (NED)	Ineos Grenadiers	+ 6' 25"
6	Filippo Conca (ITA)	Q36.5 Pro Cycling Team	+ 7' 44"
7	Samuele Battistella (ITA)	Astana Qazaqstan Team	+ 14' 20"
8	Alex Tolio (ITA)	Green Project–Bardiani–CSF–Faizanè	+ 15' 45"
9	Pelayo Sánchez (ESP)	Burgos BH	+ 22' 18"
10	Jon Barrenetxea (ESP)	Caja Rural–Seguros RGA	+ 27' 11"

=== Team classification ===
Final team classification (1–10)
Rank	Team	Time
1	(United Arab Emirates) UAE Team Emirates	57h 32' 55"
2	(United Kingdom) Ineos Grenadiers	+ 17"
3	Team Bahrain Victorious	+ 1' 47"
4	(Germany) Bora–Hansgrohe	+ 5' 01"
5	(United States) Trek–Segafredo	+ 5' 38"
6	(Netherlands) Team Jumbo–Visma	+ 7' 50"
7	(Spain) Euskaltel–Euskadi	+ 9' 40"
8	(Spain) Movistar Team	+ 9' 43"
9	(Kazakhstan) Astana Qazaqstan Team	+ 11' 01"
10	(Belgium) Intermarché–Circus–Wanty	+ 11' 03"
