= Midden–Brabant Poort Omloop =

Midden-Brabant Poort Omloop
Race details
- Date: July
- Region: Gilze, Netherlands
- Discipline: Road
- Competition: UCI Europe Tour
- Type: One-day race

History
- First edition: 2011
- Editions: 14 (as of 2026)
- First winner: Jaap Kooijman (NED)
- Most wins: Erik Jan Kooiman (NED) (2 wins)
- Most recent: Patrick Eddy (AUS)

The Midden–Brabant Poort Omloop is a one-day professional cycling race held annually in the Netherlands since 2011. It has been held as a category 1.2 event on the UCI Europe Tour since 2017.

== Winners ==
Year	Country	Rider	Team
2011	Netherlands	Erik Jan Kooiman	
2012	Netherlands	Erik Jan Kooiman	
2013	Netherlands	Sander Oostlander	
2014	Netherlands	Tom Vermeer	Cycling Team Jo Piels
2015	Netherlands	Twan Brusselman	Cyclingteam Jo Piels
2016	Netherlands	Rens te Stroet	Cyclingteam Jo Piels
2017	Netherlands	Jaap Kooijman	LottoNL–Jumbo–De Jonge Renner
2018	Netherlands	Julius van den Berg	SEG Racing Academy
2019	Netherlands	Arvid de Kleijn	Alecto Cycling Team
2020	No race due to the COVID-19 pandemic		
2021	No race due to the COVID-19 pandemic		
2022	Latvia	Mārtiņš Pluto	Abloc CT
2023	Belgium	Thimo Willems	VolkerWessels Cycling Team
2024	Belgium	Floris Van Tricht	Israel Premier Tech Academy
2025	Netherlands	Timo de Jong	VolkerWessels Cycling Team
2026	Australia	Patrick Eddy	Team Brennan
