= Floris Van Tricht =

Belgian cyclist

Personal information
- Born: 23 June 2001 (age 25) Leuven, Belgium

Cycling career
- Sport: Cycling
- Current team: NSN Cycling Team
- Disciplines: Road; Cyclo-cross
- Role: Rider

Amateur teams
- 2018: Wim Ruelens Olympia Tienen
- 2019: Brain² Olympia Tienen
- 2020: GM Recycling Team
- 2021: Basso Team Flanders
- 2022: Urbano–Vulsteke Cycling Team
- 2023: EFC–L&R–Van Mossel

Professional teams
- 2024–2025: Israel Premier Tech Academy
- 2025–: Israel–Premier Tech

Floris Van Tricht (born 23 June 2001) is a Belgian cyclist, who currently rides for UCI ProTeam NSN Cycling Team.

He was originally due to join Israel–Premier Tech in 2026, but was promoted in July 2025 after Jakob Fuglsang announced his retirement.

His older brother Stan is also a professional cyclist.

== Major results ==
2023
1st National Under-23 Gravel Championships
1st Grand Prix de Honelles
1st Memorial Bjorg Lambrecht
1st Arden Challenge #4
1st Stage 4 Tour du Piémont Pyrénéen
2nd Road race, National Under-23 Road Championships
4th Tour des 100 Communes
2024
1st Schaal Sels
1st Midden-Brabant Poort Omloop
10th Omloop van het Waasland
2026
2nd Muur Classic Geraardsbergen
3rd Ronde van Limburg
