= Alastair MacKellar =

Australian cyclist (born 2002)

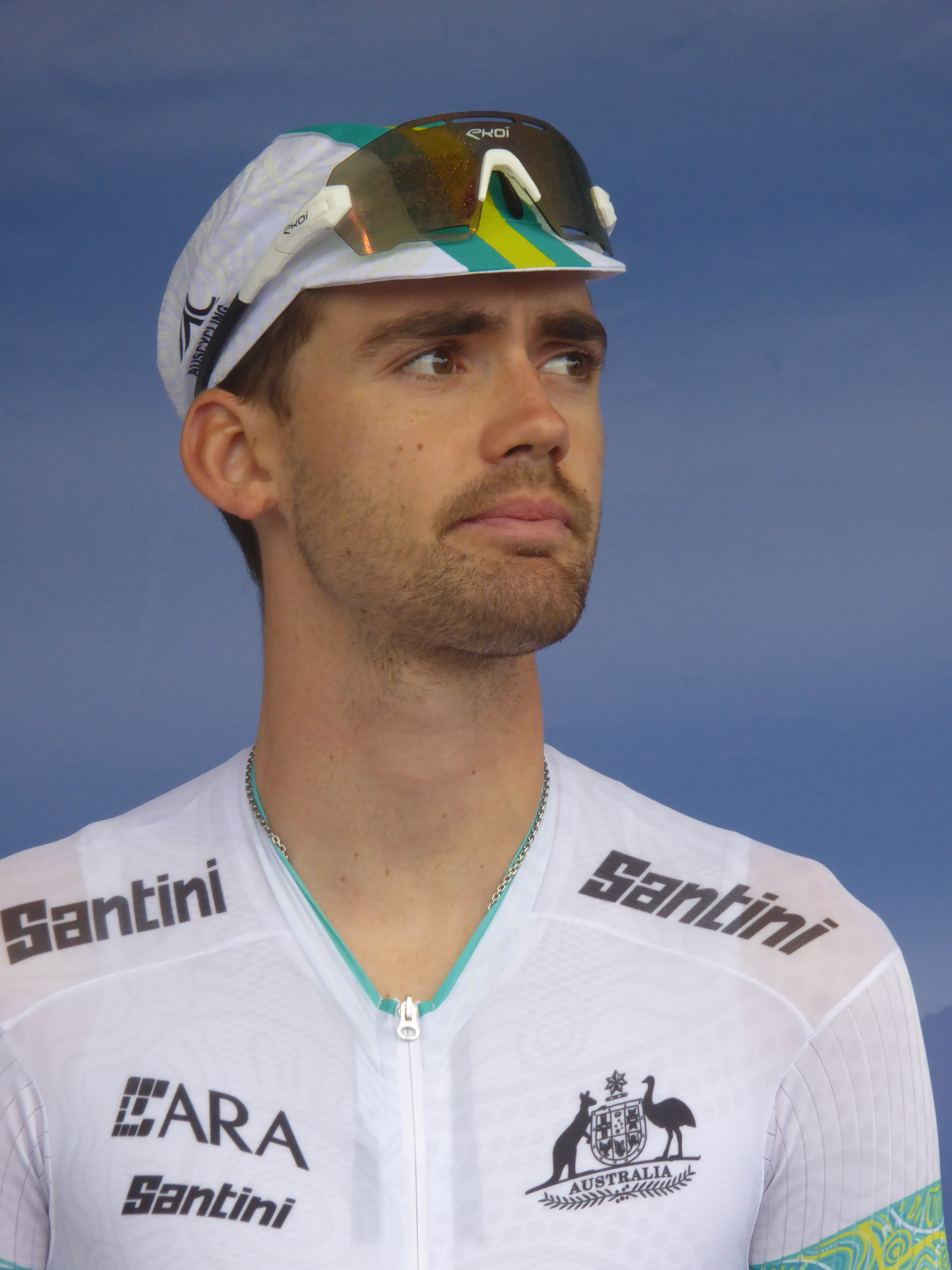
- MacKellar in 2023

Personal information
- Nickname: MackDaddy
- Born: 20 January 2002 (age 24) Nambour, Australia
- Height: 1.84 m (6 ft 0 in)
- Weight: 69 kg (152 lb)

Cycling career
- Sport: Cycling
- Current team: EF Education–EasyPost
- Discipline: Road
- Role: Rider

Amateur team
- 2018–2020: ACA–Ride Sunshine Coast

Professional teams
- 2021–2023: Israel Cycling Academy
- 2024: Hagens Berman Jayco
- 2024: Team Jayco–AlUla (stagiaire)
- 2025–: EF Education–EasyPost

Alastair MacKellar (born 20 January 2002) is an Australian professional cyclist, who currently rides for UCI WorldTeam EF Education–EasyPost.

== Career ==
In 2026, MacKellar made his debut at Paris-Roubaix. He spent almost 150 km alone in front of the broom wagon, but was determined to complete the race, recognising that "it feels like one of the only races where there’s real prestige in just finishing - even if you’re outside the time limit". He was the last rider to finish.

== Major results ==
2018
2nd Tour de Okinawa Junior
2019
3rd Time trial, National Junior Road Championships
2020
National Junior Road Championships

2nd Time trial
3rd Road race

2021
1st Stage 2 Troféu Joaquim Agostinho
2022
6th Overall Santos Festival of Cycling
2023
National Under-23 Road Championships

1st Road race
1st Time trial

2024
1st Stage 4 Alpes Isère Tour
4th Flèche Ardennaise
10th Overall International Tour of Rhodes
