= Thomas Gloag =

British cyclist

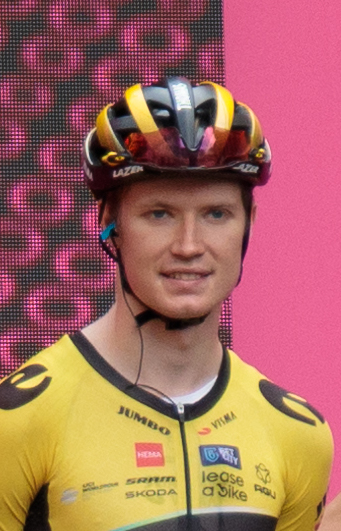
- Gloag at the 2023 Giro d'Italia

Personal information
- Full name: Thomas Gloag
- Nickname: The Gloagtrotter
- Born: 13 September 2001 (age 25) East Dulwich, England

Cycling career
- Sport: Cycling
- Current team: Pinarello–Q36.5 Pro Cycling Team
- Discipline: Road
- Role: Rider

Amateur team
- 2017–2019: VC Londres

Professional teams
- 2021–2022: Trinity Racing
- 2022: Team Jumbo–Visma (stagiaire)
- 2023–2025: Team Jumbo–Visma
- 2026-: Pinarello–Q36.5 Pro Cycling Team

Thomas Gloag (born 13 September 2001) is a British racing cyclist, who currently rides for Pinarello–Q36.5 Pro Cycling Team UCI WorldTeam .

== Career ==
At the 2022 Tour de l'Avenir Gloag was in a breakaway on stage 4 that made it to the finish line where he won the sprint against Adam Holm Jørgensen to take his second stage victory at Under-23 level. Whilst on his way up the podium to celebrate his win with Bernard Hinault he tripped and slipped down the stairs. He took lead of the race after his result, he would slip to second in the following stages then nineteenth overall before abandoning the race. It was announced on 7 August 2022 that Gloag would join Team Jumbo–Visma as a stagiaire for the rest of the 2022 season. On 29 August 2022 Team Jumbo–Visma announced that Gloag would join their team from the 2023 season on a three-year contract.

Gloag was knocked off his bike by a police vehicle during the Tre Valli Varesine in October 2026, requiring several stitches in his knee. The incident happened months after fellow cyclist Finlay Tarling had been killed by a van driving down the course of the Volta a Portugal.

== Major results ==
2019
1st Trofeo Fundación
1st Zumarraga
Junior Tour of Wales

1st Mountains classification
1st Stage 2

3rd Overall Sint-Martinusprijs Kontich

1st Stage 1 (TTT)

8th Kuurne–Brussels–Kuurne Juniors
2021
3rd Overall Ronde de l'Isard

1st Stage 4

4th Overall Giro Ciclistico d'Italia
6th Liège–Bastogne–Liège Espoirs
2022
1st Stage 4 Tour de l'Avenir
3rd Flèche Ardennaise
2023
6th Overall Volta a la Comunitat Valenciana

1st Young rider classification

2024 (1 pro win)
1st Stage 3 Czech Tour
2025
3rd Overall Okolo Slovenska
8th Overall Tour Down Under
2026
10th Figueira Champions Classic

=== Grand Tour general classification results timeline ===
Grand Tour	2023
Giro d'Italia	76
Tour de France	—
Vuelta a España	—
