= Moritz Kretschy =

German cyclist

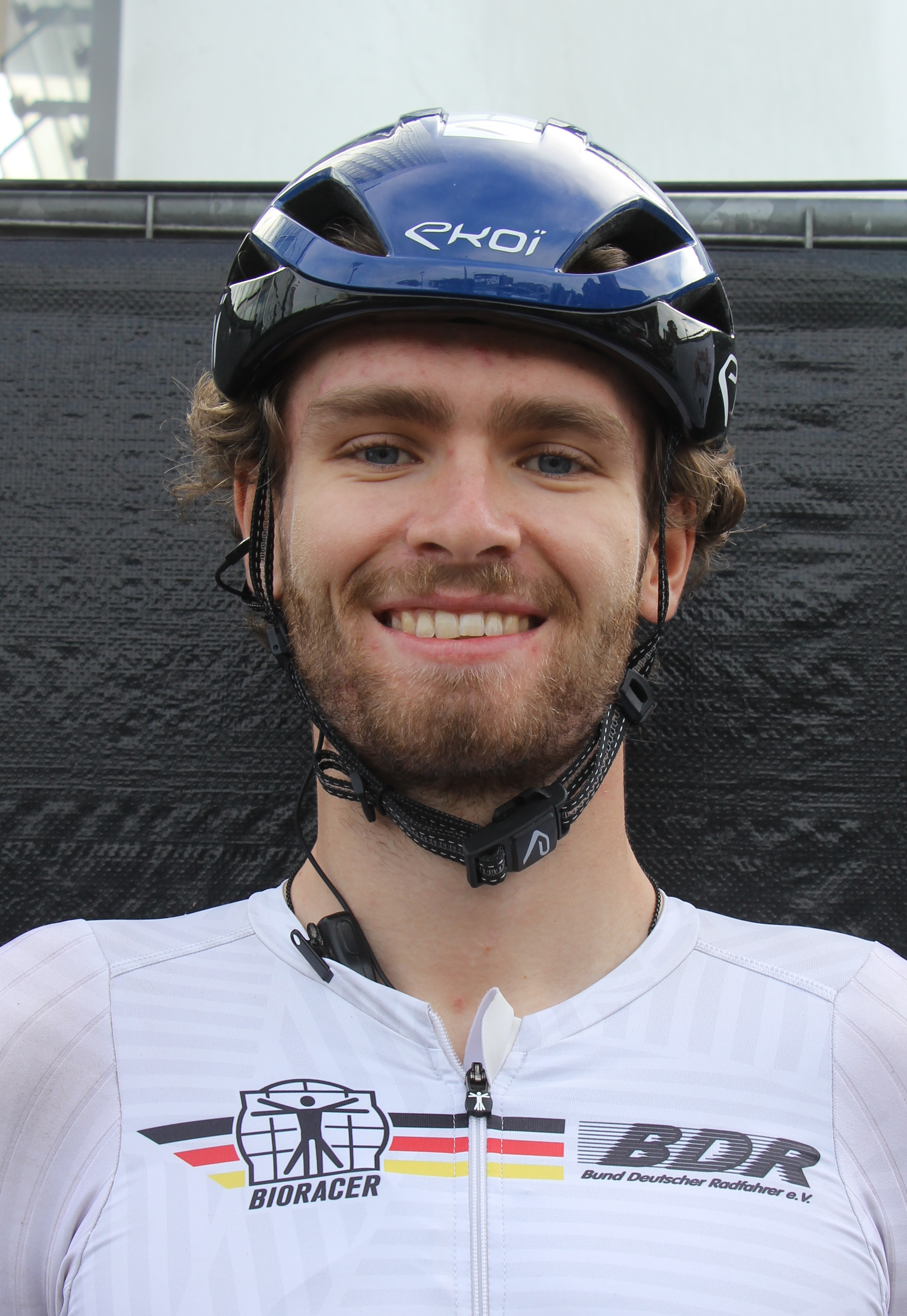
- Kretschy in 2024

Personal information
- Born: 14 May 2002 (age 24) Annaberg-Buchholz, Germany
- Height: 1.83 m (6 ft 0 in)
- Weight: 63 kg (139 lb)

Cycling career
- Sport: Cycling
- Current team: NSN Cycling Team
- Disciplines: Road; Track
- Role: Rider

Amateur team
- 2019–2020: Junioren Schwalbe Team Sachsen

Professional teams
- 2021–2023: Rad-Net Rose Team
- 2024–2026: Israel Premier Tech Academy
- 2026–: NSN Cycling Team
Medal record
Men's track cycling
Representing Germany
World Junior Championships
Gold medal – first place	2019 Frankfurt	Team pursuit
European Junior Championships
Gold medal – first place	2020 Fiorenzuola d'Arda	Points race
Silver medal – second place	2020 Fiorenzuola d'Arda	Team pursuit
Bronze medal – third place	2019 Ghent	Team pursuit

Moritz Kretschy (born 24 November 2002) is a German cyclist, who currently rides for UCI WorldTeam NSN Cycling Team.

In 2019, he won the team pursuit at the UCI Junior Track Cycling World Championships. In the final, he and his teammates set a new world record. Earlier that season, he won the bronze medal in the same event at the European Junior Championships. The following year, he became European champion in the junior points race.

For his debut in the under-23 category, he joined UCI Continental team Rad-Net Rose Team in 2021. His first result of note was a third place in the Grand Prix Velo Alanya in 2022.

In 2023, he became a double German national under-23 champion in both the road race and the time trial. The same year, he finished eighth in the Tour Alsace, and especially sixth in the under-23 road race at the World Championships. After those performances, he joined Israel Premier Tech Academy in 2024. Regularly promoted to thir professional team, he notably finished 8th in the 2024 Tour du Rwanda and second in the 2025 Tour de Taiwan. In May 2025, he won two stages of the Alpes Isère Tour.

== Major results ==
=== Road ===
2020
1st National Junior Hill-climb Championships
4th Overall Visegrad 4 Juniors
2022
3rd Grand Prix Velo Alanya
2023
National Under-23 Championships

1st Road race
1st Time trial

6th Road race, UCI World Under-23 Championships
8th Overall Tour Alsace
2024
1st National Under-23 Hill-climb Championships
9th Overall Tour du Rwanda
2025
1st Karlie Krit
1st Stages 2 & 4 Alpes Isère Tour
2nd Overall Tour de Taiwan
2026
1st Overall Tour du Rwanda

=== Track ===
2019
1st Team pursuit, UCI Junior World Championships
3rd Team pursuit, UEC European Junior Championships
2020
UEC European Junior Championships

1st Points race
3rd Team pursuit
