= Marcel Camprubí =

Spanish cyclist (born 2001)

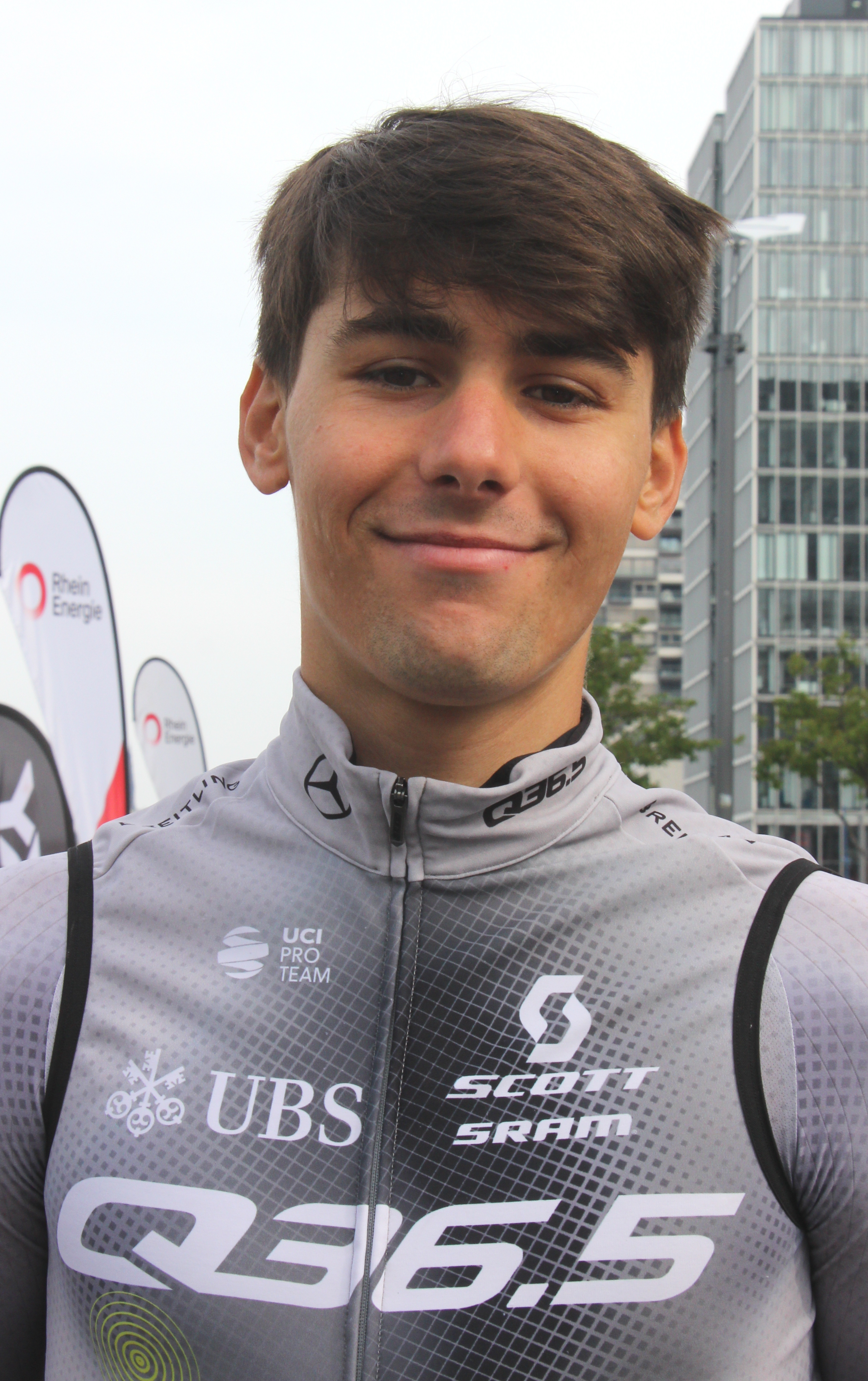
- Camprubí in 2023

Personal information
- Full name: Marcel Camprubí
- Born: 15 September 2001 (age 25) Barcelona, Spain
- Height: 1.78 m (5 ft 10 in)
- Weight: 69 kg (152 lb)

Cycling career
- Sport: Cycling
- Current team: Pinarello–Q36.5 Pro Cycling Team
- Discipline: Road
- Role: Rider

Amateur teams
- 2020: Team Smartdry
- 2021: Antiga Casa Bellsolà–Girona
- 2022: EOLO–Kometa U23

Professional team
- 2023–: Q36.5 Pro Cycling Team

Major wins
- One-day races and Classics National Road Race Championships (2026)

Marcel Camprubi Pijuan (born 15 September 2001) is a Spanish cyclist, who currently rides for UCI ProTeam Pinarello–Q36.5 Pro Cycling Team.

== Early life ==
Born in Barcelona, he competed as a youngster in triathlon. He finished third in the 2019 Spanish Sprint Triathlon National Championships junior race.

== Career ==
He was the runner-up at the U23 Spanish National Road Race Championships in 2021. In July 2021, he won the final stage of the Vuelta a la Comunidad de Madrid.

He rode in 2022 for EOLO-Kometa U23, the development team of UCI ProTeam Team Polti VisitMalta. In May 2022, he won the third stage of the Vuelta a Navarra in Berrioplano. He represented Spain at the 2022 Mediterranean Games in the road race and time trial. In August 2022, he won the Vuelta a Toledo Imperial. He won the Vuelta a Cantabria in September 2022.

He signed for the 2023 season with the Swiss UCI ProTeam Pinarello–Q36.5 Pro Cycling Team. He finished runner-up in the young rider classification at the 2023 Tour of Slovenia. In 2024, he finished seventh in the Trofeo Matteotti.

In June 2026, he won the Spanish National Road Race Championships. Camprubí was knocked off his bike by a police car during the Tre Valli Varesine in October 2026, months after fellow cyclist Finlay Tarling had been killed by a van driving down the course of the Volta a Portugal.

== Major results ==
2021
1st Stage 5 Vuelta a la Comunidad de Madrid Sub-23
2nd Road race, National Under-23 Road Championships
2022
1st Overall Vuelta a Cantabria

1st Young rider classification
1st Stage 3

1st Overall Vuelta a Toledo Imperial

1st Stage 1 (TTT)

1st Stage 3 Vuelta a Navarra
2nd Overall Vuelta a la Comunidad de Madrid Sub-23
8th Ruota d'Oro
2023
7th Overall Giro della Valle d'Aosta
2024
6th Overall Istrian Spring Trophy
7th Trofeo Matteotti
2025
6th Overall International Tour of Hellas
2026 (1 pro win)
1st Road race, National Road Championships
4th Circuito de Getxo
8th Veneto Classic
9th Clásica de San Sebastián
10th GP Gippingen

=== Grand Tour general classification results timeline ===
Grand Tour	2025
Giro d'Italia	—
Tour de France	—
Vuelta a España	114

Legend
—	Did not compete
DNF	Did not finish
