= Oliver Peace =

British cyclist

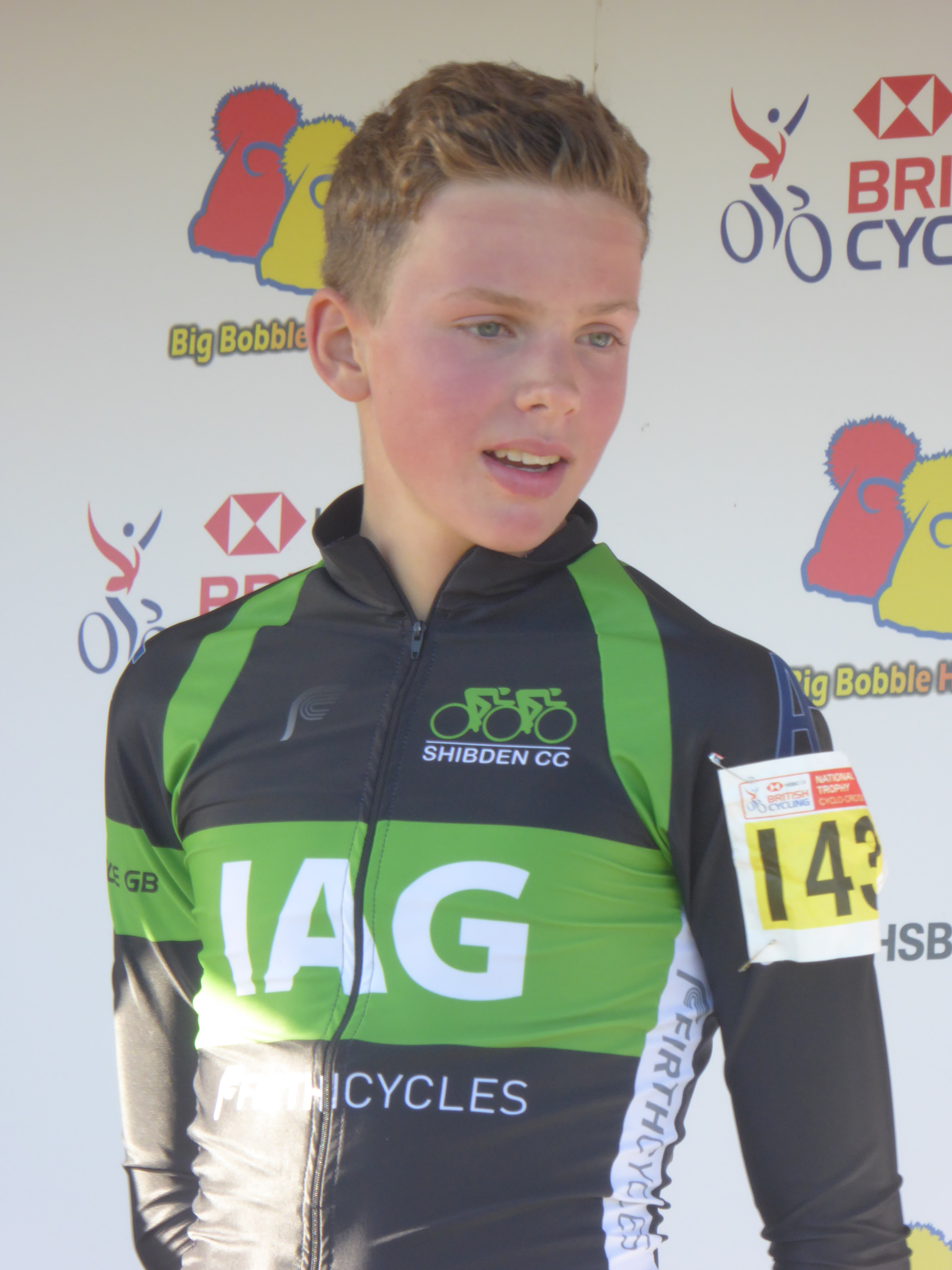
- Peace in 2018

Personal information
- Born: 2 April 2005 (age 21) Keighley, England
- Height: 1.86 m (6 ft 1 in)
- Weight: 64 kg (141 lb)

Cycling career
- Sport: Cycling
- Current team: Development Team DSM–Firmenich PostNL
- Discipline: Road
- Role: Rider
- Rider type: Climber

Amateur team
- 2022–2023: Tofauti Everyone Active

Professional team
- 2024–2025: Development Team DSM–Firmenich PostNL

Oliver Peace (born 2 April 2005) is a British cyclist who rides for UCI Continental team Development Team Picnic–PostNL. In 2026, he will join UCI WorldTeam Team Picnic–PostNL.

== Early life ==
From Ilkley, he started cycling at 12 years-old. He attended Bradford Grammar School.

== Career ==
He made his debut on the UCI ProSeries at the 2024 Tour of the Alps. He was selected to ride the 2024 Tour of Britain in September 2024 and the Tour de Langkawi in 2025.

== Major results ==
=== Road ===
2022
1st Overall Vuelta a Las Comarcas

1st Stage 1

3rd Hatherleigh Junior Road Race
8th Overall Ronde des Vallées
2023
5th Overall Junior Tour of Wales
8th Overall Gipuzkoa Klasikoa
2024
6th Paris–Tours Espoirs

=== Cyclo-cross ===
2022–2023
2nd National Junior Championships
2nd Clanfield Juniors
