= Pau Martí (cyclist) =

Spanish cyclist

Personal information
- Full name: Pau Martí Soriano
- Born: 24 November 2004 (age 21) Moixent, Spain

Cycling career
- Sport: Cycling
- Current team: NSN Cycling Team
- Discipline: Road
- Role: Rider

Amateur team
- 2021–2022: Team Teika–GSPort–BH

Professional teams
- 2023–2025: Israel Premier Tech Academy
- 2026–: NSN Cycling Team

Pau Martí Soriano (born 24 November 2004) is a Spanish cyclist, who currently rides for UCI WorldTeam NSN Cycling Team.

He took his first elite wins in 2025, winning the overall classification of the Course de la Paix U23 – Grand Prix Jeseníky in May and as a stage of the Volta a Portugal in August.

== Major results ==
2023
6th Gran Premio Sportivi di Poggiana
2024
3rd Overall Giro Next Gen
3rd Flèche Ardennaise
2025 (1 pro win)
1st Overall Grand Prix Jeseníky
1st Stage 2 Volta a Portugal
4th Overall Volta ao Alentejo
6th Road race, UCI Road World Under-23 Championships
10th Japan Cup
2026 (1)
1st Stage 2 Tour du Rwanda
3rd Figueira Champions Classic
10th Gran Piemonte
