= NSN Cycling Team =

Swiss cycling team

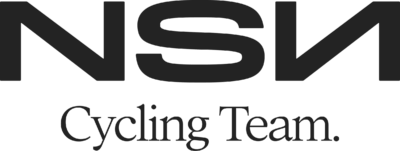

Team information
- UCI code: NSN
- Registered: Switzerland
- Founded: 2015
- Discipline: Road
- Status: UCI Continental (2015–2016); UCI Professional Continental (2017–2019); UCI World Tour (2020–2022); UCI ProTeam (2023–2025); UCI World Tour (2026-)
- Bicycles: Factor (2017–2025); Scott (2026–)
- Website: Team home page

Key personnel
- Team manager: Kjell Carlström

Team name history
2015–2016	Cycling Academy Team
2017–2019	Israel Cycling Academy
2020–2021	Israel Start-Up Nation
2022–2025	Israel–Premier Tech
2026-	NSN Cycling Team

The NSN Cycling Team (UCI team code: NSN) is a UCI WorldTeam cycling team. It was originally founded in 2014 by Ron Baron and Ran Margaliot as Cycling Academy and was based in Israel. It started as a Continental outfit to help develop young cycling talent and kickstart their professional careers. Under the names of Israel Start-Up Nation and Israel–Premier Tech, the team competed as a UCI World Tour squad from 2020 to 2022 before being relegated to the UCI ProTeam at the end of the 2022 season. From 2023 to 2025, the team and its riders were subject to disruptions by protestors over the Gaza War and accused of sportswashing.

In November 2025, it was announced that the team would go through a rebrand and be renamed to NSN Cycling Team for the 2026 cycling season. The team rides under a Swiss license and is based in Spain and competes in the World Tour.

== History ==
=== Israel Cycling Academy (2014–2019) ===
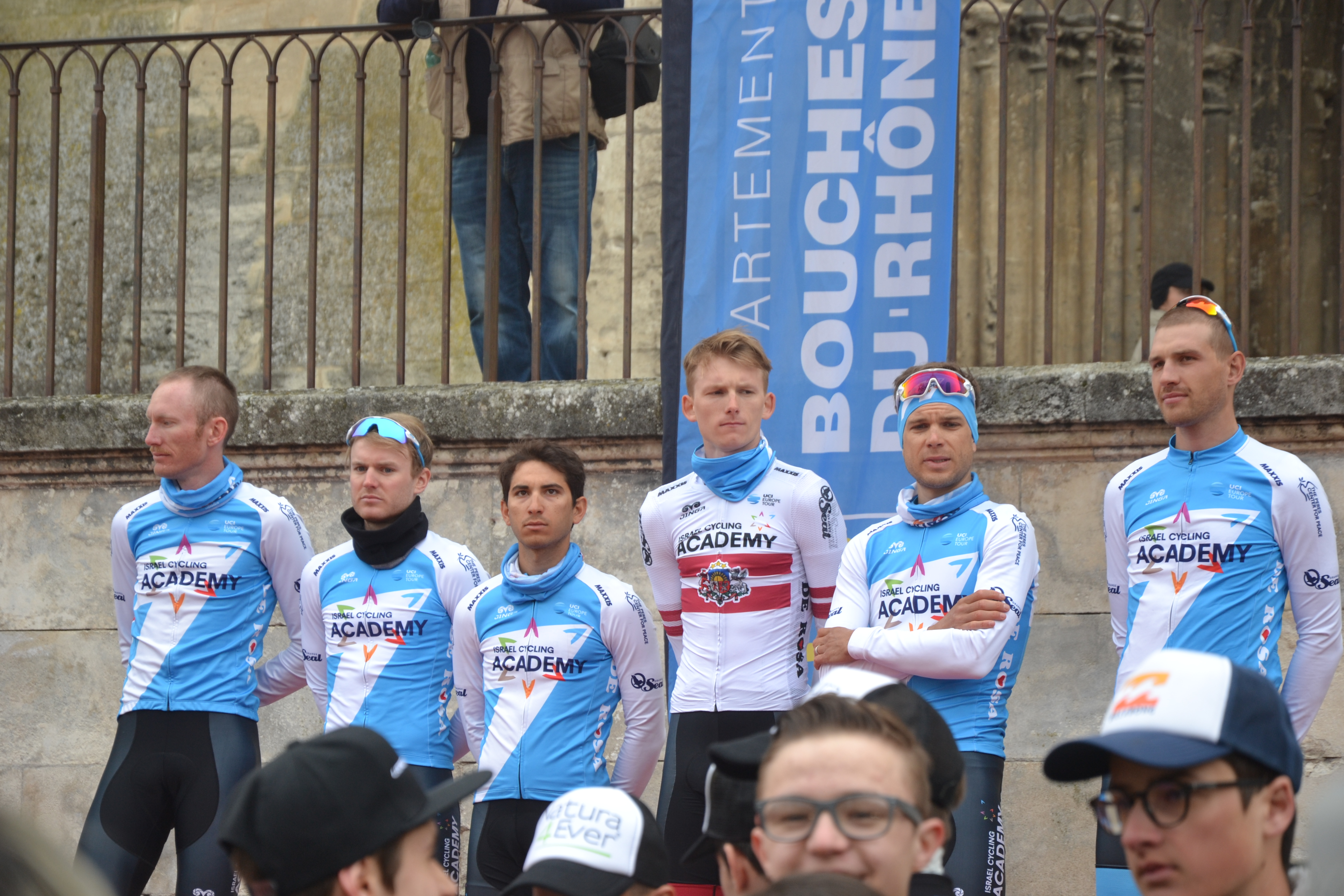
Riders at the 2019 Tour de la Provence

In November 2014, Ron Baron and Ran Margaliot launched the Israel Cycling Academy (ICA), with the aim of providing an opportunity for young and talented cyclists to compete in the international arena and launch their professional careers. The team's first victory came in the fourth stage of the 2015 Tour d'Azerbaïdjan, won by Daniel Turek. On 2 July 2015, the Israeli Road Racing Champion Guy Sagiv joined the ranks of ICA.

In 2018, the team participated in a cycling monument event, Milan–San Remo, for the first time; and in a grand tour, the 2018 Giro d'Italia, for the first time. The Giro d’Italia opening stage took place in Jerusalem on 4 May 2018 – the first time in the Giro's 101 years of existence that it has started outside Europe. The Giro held its second and third stages in Israel before it continued onto European soil.

The three stages raced in Israel attracted considerable interest from the Israeli public, with many thousands of Israelis lining up along the route and supporting the riders and especially the ICA home team. It was considered a significant success. ICA co-owner Sylvan Adams was the driving force behind the Giro's "Big Start" in Israel, having financed a significant part of the race budget. ICA's best performance in the Giro was recorded in the 18th stage, when its Spanish rider Ruben Plaza finished in second place. Three days later when the team completed the Giro in Rome, Guy Sagiv became the first-ever Israeli cyclist to finish a grand tour.

In 2019, in its fifth season of existence, ICA enlarged its team roster to 30 riders and set up a racing program that has exceeded 250 racing days all around the globe. The team was invited to take part in the Giro d’Italia In May 2019. The team owners, Ron Baron and Sylvan Adams, have set the team's goal as participation in the world's biggest races including the Tour de France, in order to continue inspiring and developing a new generation of Israeli cyclists.

In January 2019 the team opened three special youth cycling programs in Israel and formed a youth cycling team in the Arab village of Shfaram. To further develop young Israeli cyclists, ICA operates a development team with a select group of under-23 riders. They also established a special partnership with one of the leading French amateur teams – Côte d’Armor – which enabled its young development team riders to race in France and gain valuable experience overseas.

=== Israel Start-Up Nation (2020–2021) ===
In October 2019, Israel Cycling Academy completed the takeover of UCI World Tour team Katusha-Alpecin, including its UCI WorldTour license. As a result, Israel Cycling Academy was due to become a UCI World Tour team, pending UCI approval. The UCI approved the team's promotion to World Tour status in December of that year, and the team subsequently changed its name to Israel Start-Up Nation, while the former name became the name of the team's continental level development squad. In July 2020, it was announced that seven-time Grand Tour winner Chris Froome would join the team for the 2021 season.

In August and September 2020, Israel Start-Up Nation took part in the 2020 Tour de France. On 11 October 2020, the team won a Grand Tour stage for the first time when British rider Alex Dowsett won Stage 8 of the 2020 Giro d'Italia. They won another Grand Tour stage 11 days later when Irish rider Dan Martin won Stage 3 of the 2020 Vuelta a España, a result that also took him up from third to second in the General classification; he eventually finished fourth in that classification. On 4 December 2020, the team announced Cherie Pridham as a new sports director, the first woman to assume the role on a men's World Tour team.

In the 2021 Giro d'Italia in May, Italian rider Alessandro De Marchi briefly wore the maglia rosa as leader of the general classification after Stages 4 and 5, while Dan Martin won Stage 17 and finished tenth overall, and Davide Cimolai finished second in the Points classification. The team itself finished as one of three teams with no penalty points in the Fair Play classification. However, tie-breakers meant that it finished third in the classification, as Dan Martin's tenth-place finish in the general classification was bettered by Tobias Foss finishing ninth for Team Jumbo–Visma and by Damiano Caruso finishing second for Team Bahrain Victorious.

=== Israel–Premier Tech (2022–2025) ===
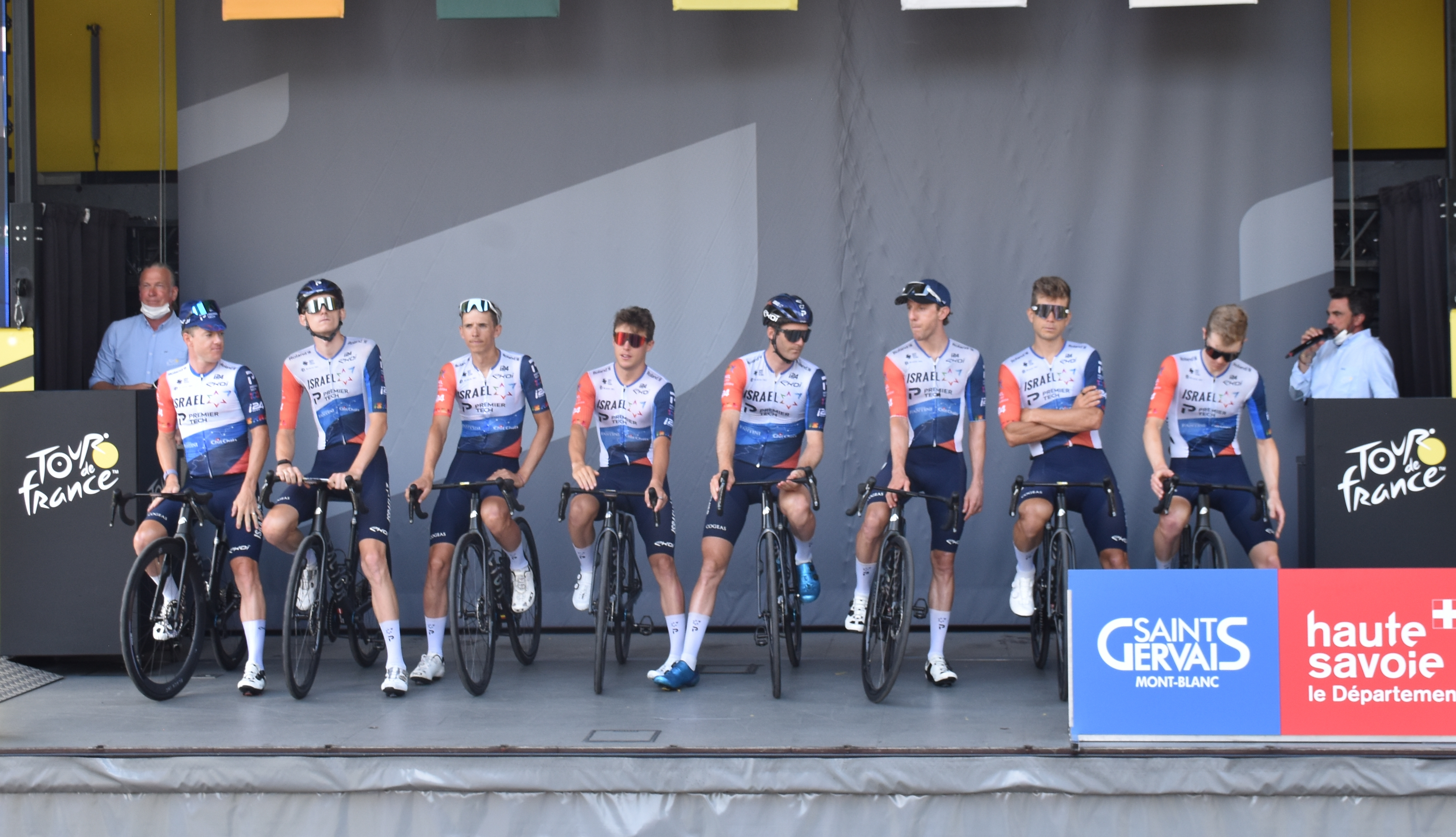
The team at the 2023 Tour de France

Ahead of the 2022 season, the team announced that Canadian tech company Premier Tech would join as a co-title sponsor.

The season was largely disappointing for IPT, as they struggled for results and faced the threat of relegation from the UCI World Tour. Canadian rider Hugo Houle provided a moment of success with his maiden Tour de France and Grand Tour stage victory, after which an emotional Houle dedicated the win to his late brother. Australian rider Simon Clarke also claimed a stage victory during the race.

The team was relegated from the World Tour at the end of the 2022 season after finishing 20th in the points standings for the 2020 – 2022 qualification cycle. The top 18 teams qualified for the 2023 – 2025 cycle, meaning that from 2023 the team will drop down a division and race under a UCI ProTeam licence. Among non-World Tour teams, IPT finished third in the 2022 one-year points list behind Lotto–Soudal and Team TotalEnergies, meaning it also missed out on wildcards for 2023 World Tour stage races but would receive entries to all World Tour one-day events.

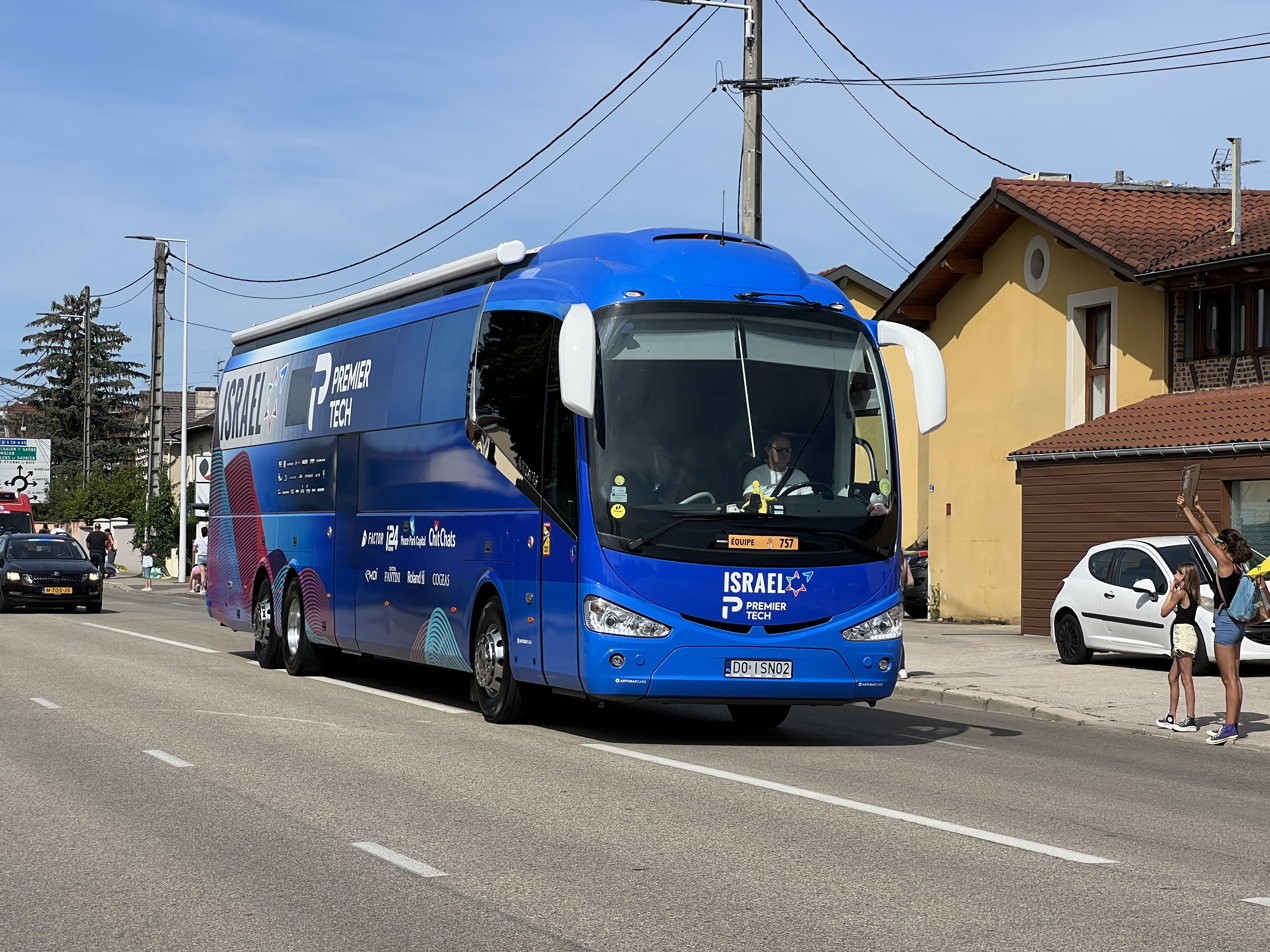
A team bus in 2023

However, the UCI subsequently announced that IPT would receive invitations to single-week World Tour stage races in 2023, a decision made due to "three years of significant upheaval due to the global pandemic". IPT was awarded a wildcard entry to the 2023 Giro d'Italia after both Lotto-Dstny and Team TotalEnergies declined to take part and was also invited to the 2023 Tour de France, meaning that with the exception of the Vuelta a España their 2023 race programme will be largely unaffected by their relegation.

On July 9, Michael Woods won stage 9 of the 2023 Tour de France on a mountain day with a final steep climb to Puy de Dôme. This is Israel–Premier Tech's third Tour de France victory, after two wins in 2022.

==== Calls for exclusion and protests related to Gaza war ====
As a result of the Gaza war, Israel–Premier Tech and its team members have been subject to many disruptions by protestors. The Times of Israel said the team has been targeted because it "is a private initiative meant to boost Israel's image worldwide." Sylvan Adams has described the Gaza war as a contest between "good vs. evil and civilization against barbarism."

In 2024, Australian pro-Palestinian protesters disrupted Simon Clarke during the Australian National Championships because of his affiliation with the team. Demonstrators carried a banner reading “Israel – Premier Tech not welcome” and chanted criticism that "Simon Clarke serves an apartheid regime." Israel–Premier Tech responded "We are the only professional sports team in the world that includes Israel as part of its name, and we will continue to do so and proudly represent the country."

In early 2025, the Palestinian movement Boycott, Divestment and Sanctions (BDS) called for "peaceful protests" at the 2025 Tour de France against the participation of Israel–Premier Tech. In April 2025, during the 2025 Amstel Gold Race, the pro-Palestinian protest group "Free Palestine Maastricht" again disrupted Israel–Premier Tech's participation. In May 2025, an activist was charged with assault after running onto the road in front of an Israel–Premier Tech rider in a breakaway from the peloton at the Giro d’Italia.

During the 2025 Tour de France (5–27 July 2025), protests over the genocide in Gaza and calls for the exclusion of Israel-Premier Tech from the competition continued. Notably, on stage 11 of the Tour of 16 July 2025, a protestor ran onto the final straight of the stage, but was tackled and beaten by the Tour's manager for stage finishes, before being arrested. The protestor later defended his actions explaining "We have reached a point where we are forced to choose new spaces to express ourselves. The world of sport has not done its job and has not shown its opposition to what is happening in the Middle East". He defended freedom of speech, and denounced the beating and verbal abuse by the Tour executive, even after he was brought to the ground outside the course.

The following days, former Israel-Premier Tech cyclists publicly expressed relief at not riding for the team any more due to Israel's actions in Gaza. Former Israel-Premier Tech rider Alessandro De Marchi stated on 25 July 2025 that he “would have really struggled to be there now and been in great difficulty. [...] I won't criticise anyone riding there because everyone is free to decide, but right now I wouldn't sign a contract with Israel. I wouldn't be able to manage the feelings I have, to be able to be involved in something like that.” He also criticized the UCI stating "We need to see real action from our governing body to position the cycling world on the right side and to show awareness of what's going on in Gaza. [...] We have to show that as a cycling world we care about human rights and international law violations.”

Anti-apartheid and anti-genocide organizations called for the exclusion of Israel-Premier Tech from the 2025 Vuelta a España (23 August – 14 September 2025) under the slogan "Sport without genocide". La Vuelta director Javier Guillén responded on 20 August 2025 stating that the organizers "We're aware of the controversy surrounding the Israeli team [...], but we can't expel it from La Vuelta. It's impossible, and it's in the race by its own right. It has every right to participate, and we have every right to host it. [...] We're not unaware of what's happening, but we have nothing to say to any peaceful demonstration; protesting is a constitutional right." On 25 August 2025, the Spanish Izquierda Unida political party reiterated calls for the Spanish Government to exclude the team due to the International Court of Justice provisional measures based on the Convention on the Prevention and Punishment of the Crime of Genocide in the Gaza Strip (South Africa v. Israel) and called for an investigation on agreements and the use of public funds in relation with Israel-Premier Tech as a "sports washing tool for Genocide".

On 27 August 2025, protestors with Palestinian flags and a banner reading "Neutrality is complicity. Boycott Israel" blocked Israel-Premier Tech's team time trial during Stage 5 of the 2025 Vuelta a España. The team finished the stage in 19th place of 23, losing 0:54 seconds to the stage winners UAE Team Emirates - XRG, but were then awarded 15 seconds due to the protest, thus placing them in 14th place. One protestor was arrested by the regional Catalan Police. Guillén responded by stating "they cannot allow what happened" in Stage 5 with the Israel-Premier Tech team. Some sports commentators have commended protestors, but disapproved that the protest affected only one team and for putting rider safety at risk during the protest. Other commentators disapproved the protest all together affirming that the Vuelta is not the place for such protests.

=== NSN Cycling Team (2026–) ===
In September 2025, the team was excluded from participating in the Giro dell'Emilia due to possible disruptions. On 6 October 2025, the team said it would change its name and move away from its association with Israel. In November 2025, it was announced that entertainment company Never Say Never (NSN) and global investment platform Stoneweg would take over the team in a joint venture and that the team would be renamed to NSN Cycling Team, with a Swiss license and based in Spain. Alongside this, Canadian-Israeli billionaire Sylvan Adams and team owner withdrew from being involved directly in the daily operations.

In December 2025, it was announced that Intermarché-Wanty rider Biniam Girmay had a signed a three-year contract with the rebranded NSN Cycling Team. Bicycle producer Scott signed an unspecified multi-year sponsorship deal with the new team, who will also be the team's new bike supplier starting in 2026. This marks the return of Scott to a UCI World Tour team after a year of absence. On December 9, the new co-owner and former FC Barcelona player Andrés Iniesta formally presented Girmay as their team leader and unveiled their new kit for the team in Barcelona. The team regards Barcelona as their "home city", and was used as the main inspiration for the kit design. The team received a World Tour license for the next three seasons.

In 2026, following Derek Gee-West's notice of termination in early August 2025, which was disputed by IPT, he officially signed a three-year contract with Lidl-Trek in 2026. NSN Cycling Team confirmed that all three parties involved, with authorization by the UCI, reached an agreement to end the existing contract with IPT. That same week, the team signed former Intermarché-Wanty rider Dion Smith and promoted Rotem Tene from their development team, the latter rider is set to replace Simon Clarke, who is retiring on February 2.

Sprinter Ethan Vernon clinched the 4th stage of the 2026 Tour Down Under, marking the first victory for the new team. The stage was meant to be the queen stage of the tour, but was truncated due to the severe heat, as such the Willunga Hill was eliminated from the course. At his first race of the season, Girmay won the opening stage of the Volta a la Comunitat Valenciana, ending his dry spell he had since his green jersey win at the 2024 Tour de France. George Bennett grabbed his second national title at the New Zealand National Road Race Championships on February 7, 2026.

== Partnerships ==
From 2020 to 2025 Factor Bikes was a technical partner of Israel-Premier Tech, despite accusations that the team is “sportswashing [Israel's] grave crimes against Palestinians”. Israel-Premier Tech has most notably contributed to the design of the Factor O2 VAM model. The bike manufacturer's then Head of Engineering, Graham Shrive, declared in 2023 that "the level of involvement from Israel-Premier Tech is above anything you might expect. “We have a weekly call with the team and we’re in touch most days. [...] Every time we go to the wind tunnel, three guys from the team join us. Rob [Gitelis, CEO] really values long-term relationships, which is rare in the bike industry. We’re with IPT for the long haul.”

Facing questions on CyclingNews over the partnership and the genocide in Gaza in 2024, Factor Bikes and Black Inc. founder Rob Gitelis defended the partnership: "I think that people understand that we're a bike company for the most part. We're not condoning what's happening there". On 3 July 2025, two days before the start of the 2025 Tour de France and amidst calls for the exclusion of the team from the competition, Factor and Israel-Premier Tech announced a new multi-year contract. Gitelis stated they “are delighted to continue our partnership with Israel – Premier Tech. [...] This partnership is where innovation meets reality, and that's where Factor thrives.”

The NSN team announced that in 2026 it will use Scott rather than Factor bikes.

== Team roster ==
As of 23 June 2026.

Rider	Date of birth
Lewis Askey (GBR)	4 May 2001 (age 25)
George Bennett (NZL)	7 April 1990 (age 36)
Joseph Blackmore (GBR)	23 February 2003 (age 23)
Guillaume Boivin (CAN)	25 May 1989 (age 37)
Simon Clarke (Note: Retired on February 2.) (AUS)	18 July 1986 (age 40)
Pier-André Côté (CAN)	24 April 1997 (age 29)
Itamar Einhorn (ISR)	20 September 1997 (age 28)
Marco Frigo (ITA)	2 March 2000 (age 26)
Brady Gilmore (AUS)	14 April 2001 (age 25)
Biniam Girmay (ERI)	2 April 2000 (age 26)
Jan Hirt (CZE)	21 January 1991 (age 35)
Hugo Hofstetter (FRA)	13 February 1994 (age 32)
Oded Kogut (ISR)	14 February 2001 (age 25)
Moritz Kretschy (Note: Joined on May 8.) (GER)	12 May 2002 (age 24)
Matis Louvel (FRA)	19 July 1999 (age 27)
Alexey Lutsenko (KAZ)	7 September 1992 (age 33)

Rider	Date of birth
Pau Martí (ESP)	24 November 2004 (age 21)
Ryan Mullen (IRL)	7 August 1994 (age 32)
Krists Neilands (LAT)	18 August 1994 (age 32)
Alessandro Pinarello (ITA)	13 July 2003 (age 23)
Nadav Raisberg (ISR)	29 March 2001 (age 25)
Nick Schultz (AUS)	13 September 1994 (age 31)
Riley Sheehan (USA)	16 June 2000 (age 26)
Dion Smith (NZL)	3 March 1993 (age 33)
Jake Stewart (GBR)	2 October 1999 (age 26)
Corbin Strong (NZL)	30 April 2000 (age 26)
Rotem Tene (Note: Joined on February 2.) (ISR)	30 March 2001 (age 25)
Tom Van Asbroeck (BEL)	19 April 1990 (age 36)
Floris Van Tricht (BEL)	23 June 2001 (age 25)
Ethan Vernon (GBR)	26 August 2000 (age 26)
Stephen Williams (GBR)	9 June 1996 (age 30)

== National champions ==
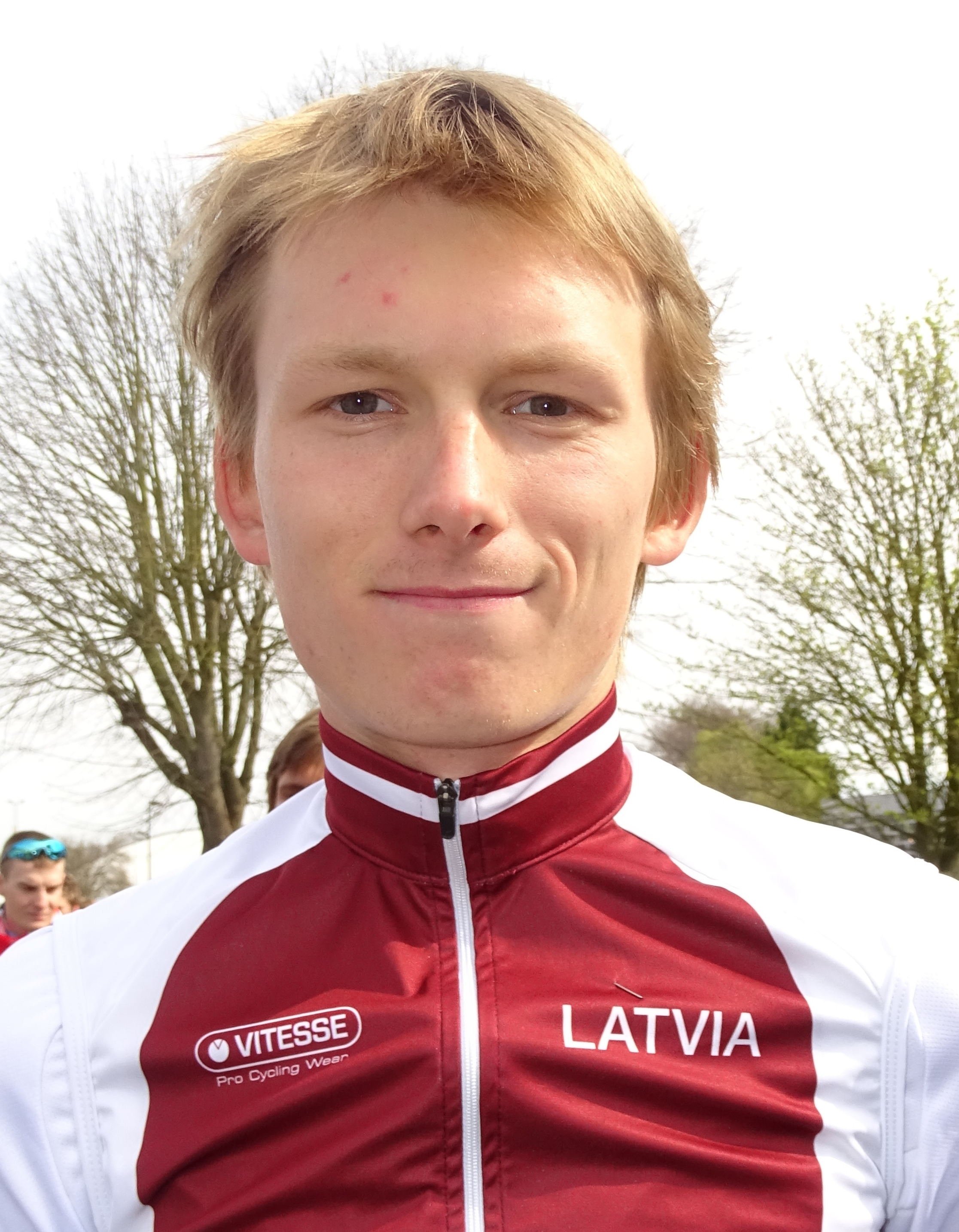
Krists Neilands

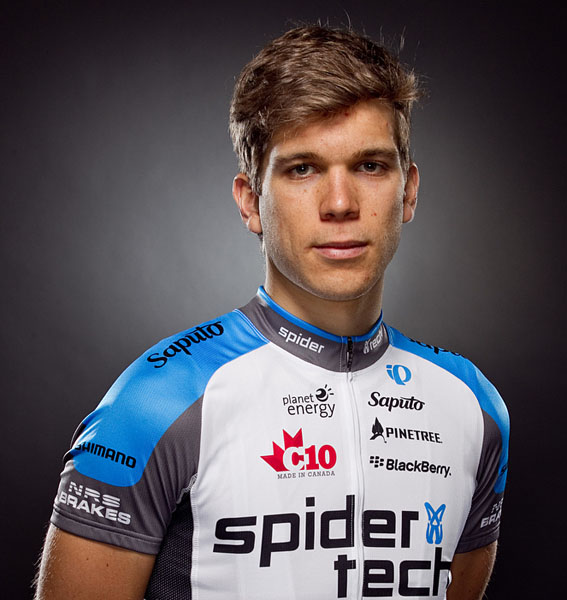
Guillaume Boivin

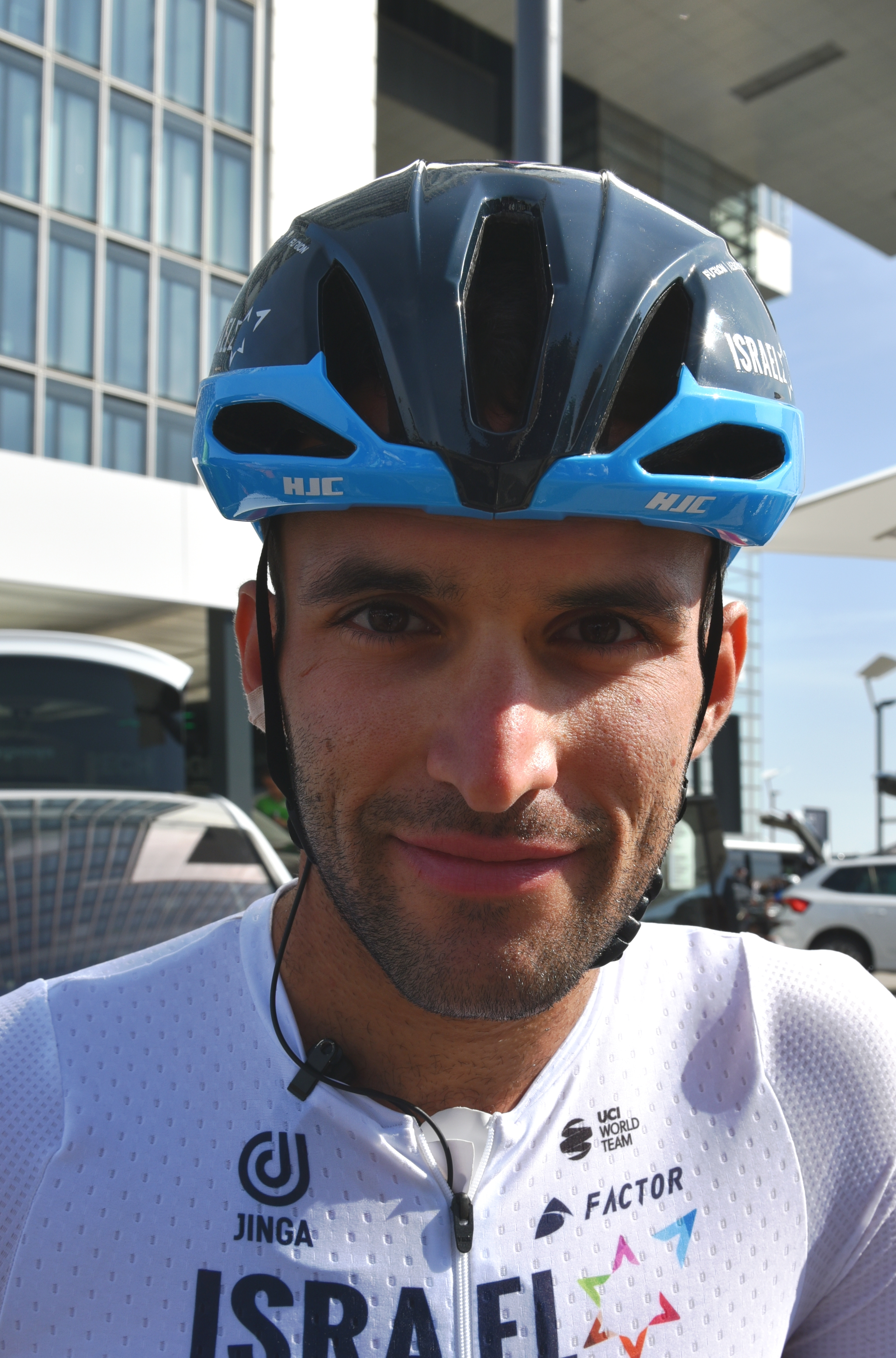
Itamar Einhorn

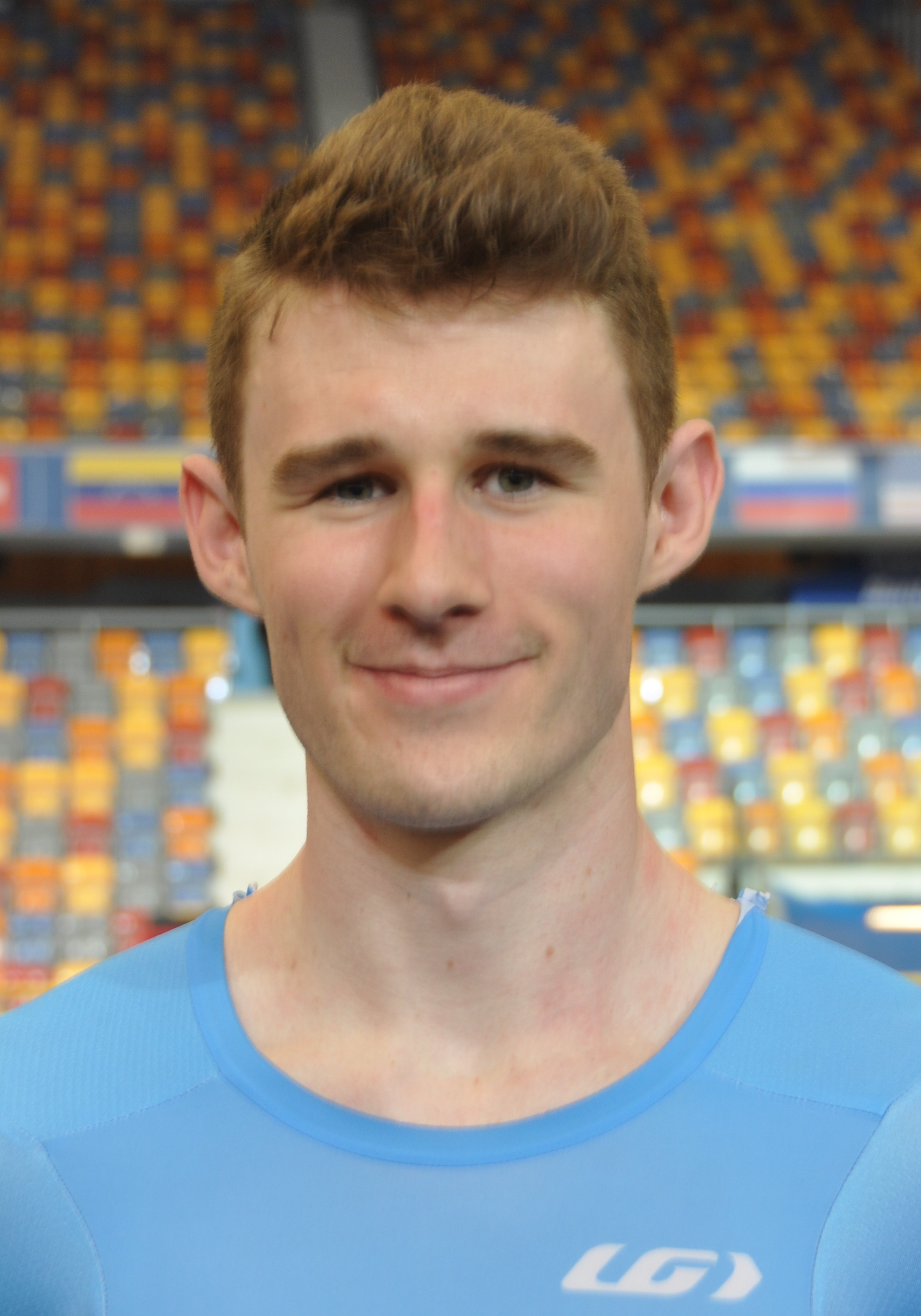
Derek Gee

2015
Israel Time Trial, Yoav Bear
Israel Road Race, Guy Sagiv
2016
Namibia Road Race, Dan Craven
Israel Time Trial, Aviv Yechezkel
Israel Road Race, Guy Sagiv
Mexico Road Race, Luis Lemus
Estonia Road Race, Mihkel Raim
2017
Israel Time Trial, Guy Sagiv
Israel Road Race, Roy Goldstein
Latvian Road Race, Krists Neilands
2018
Israel Time Trial, Omer Goldstein
Israel Road Race, Roy Goldstein
Latvian Road Race, Krists Neilands
Estonia Road Race, Mihkel Raim
2019
Austria Time Trial, Matthias Brändle
Israel Time Trial, Guy Niv
Latvian Time Trial, Krists Neilands
Israel Road Race, Guy Sagiv
2020
Estonia Road Race, Norman Vahtra
Austria Time Trial, Matthias Brändle
Israel Time Trial, Guy Sagiv
Israel Road Race, Omer Goldstein
2021
Israel Time Trial, Omer Goldstein
Austria Time Trial, Matthias Brändle
Denmark Road Race, Mads Würtz Schmidt
Canada Road Race, Guillaume Boivin
2022
Israel Time Trial, Omer Goldstein
Israel Road Race, Itamar Einhorn
2023
Canada Time Trial, Derek Gee
Israel Road Race, Itamar Einhorn
2026
New Zealand Road Race, George Bennett

== See also ==
- Sport in Israel
- Cycling in Israel
