= List of teams and cyclists in the 2024 Giro d'Italia =

List of cyclists

The following is a list of teams and cyclists who participated in the 2024 Giro d'Italia.

== Teams ==
UCI WorldTeams

- Alpecin–Deceuninck
- Arkéa–B&B Hotels
- Astana Qazaqstan Team
- Bora–Hansgrohe
- Cofidis
- Decathlon–AG2R La Mondiale
- EF Education–EasyPost
- Groupama–FDJ
- Ineos Grenadiers
- Intermarché–Wanty
- Lidl–Trek
- Movistar Team
- Soudal–Quick-Step
- Team Bahrain Victorious
- Team dsm–firmenich PostNL
- Team Jayco–AlUla
- UAE Team Emirates
- Visma–Lease a Bike

UCI ProTeams

- Israel–Premier Tech
- Polti–Kometa
- Tudor Pro Cycling Team
- VF Group–Bardiani–CSF–Faizanè

== Cyclists ==
Legend
No.	Starting number worn by the rider during the Giro
Pos.	Position in the general classification
Time	Deficit to the winner of the general classification
‡	Denotes riders born on or after 1 January 1999 eligible for the young rider classification
General classification	Denotes the winner of the general classification
Points classification	Denotes the winner of the points classification
Mountains classification	Denotes the winner of the mountains classification
Young rider classification	Denotes the winner of the young rider classification (eligibility indicated by ‡)
Combativity award	Denotes the winner of the combativity award
Intergiro classification	Denotes the winner of the intergiro classification
DNS	Denotes a rider who did not start a stage, followed by the stage before which he withdrew
DNF	Denotes a rider who did not finish a stage, followed by the stage in which he withdrew
DSQ	Denotes a rider who was disqualified from the race, followed by the stage in which this occurred
HD	Denotes a rider finished outside the time limit, followed by the stage in which they did so
Ages correct as of Saturday 4 May 2024, the date on which the Giro began

=== By starting number ===
No.	Name	Nationality	Team	Age	Pos.	Time	Ref.
1	Geraint Thomas	Great Britain	Ineos Grenadiers	37	3	+10' 24"	
2	Thymen Arensman ‡	Netherlands	Ineos Grenadiers	24	6	+14' 31"	
3	Tobias Foss	Norway	Ineos Grenadiers	26	79	+4h 1' 40"	
4	Filippo Ganna	Italy	Ineos Grenadiers	27	101	+4h 34' 59"	
5	Jhonatan Narváez	Ecuador	Ineos Grenadiers	27	28	+1h 33' 13"	
6	Magnus Sheffield ‡	United States	Ineos Grenadiers	22	59	+3h 06' 10"	
7	Ben Swift	Great Britain	Ineos Grenadiers	36	58	+3h 04' 46"	
8	Connor Swift	Great Britain	Ineos Grenadiers	28	83	+4h 08' 46"	
11	Kaden Groves	Australia	Alpecin–Deceuninck	25	91	+4h 18' 38"	
12	Tobias Bayer ‡	Austria	Alpecin–Deceuninck	24	96	+4h 25' 27"	
13	Nicola Conci	Italy	Alpecin–Deceuninck	27	23	+1h 09' 10"	
14	Quinten Hermans	Belgium	Alpecin–Deceuninck	28	53	+2h 53' 06"	
15	Jimmy Janssens	Belgium	Alpecin–Deceuninck	34	84	+4h 13' 19"	
16	Timo Kielich ‡	Belgium	Alpecin–Deceuninck	24	111	+4h 56' 47"	
17	Edward Planckaert	Belgium	Alpecin–Deceuninck	29	95	+4h 25' 03"	
18	Fabio Van den Bossche ‡	Belgium	Alpecin–Deceuninck	23	107	+4h 46' 05"	
21	Jenthe Biermans	Belgium	Arkéa–B&B Hotels	28	DNS-16	–	
22	Louis Barré ‡	France	Arkéa–B&B Hotels	24	DNS-11	–	
23	Ewen Costiou ‡	France	Arkéa–B&B Hotels	21	90	+4h 18' 08"	
24	David Dekker	Netherlands	Arkéa–B&B Hotels	26	DNF-17	–	
25	Donavan Grondin ‡	France	Arkéa–B&B Hotels	23	119	+5h 19' 38"	
26	Michel Ries	Luxembourg	Arkéa–B&B Hotels	26	25	+1h 20' 06"	
27	Alan Riou	France	Arkéa–B&B Hotels	27	142	+6h 02' 28"	
28	Alessandro Verre ‡	Italy	Arkéa–B&B Hotels	22	73	+3h 54' 23"	
31	Alexey Lutsenko	Kazakhstan	Astana Qazaqstan Team	31	DNS-9	–	
32	Davide Ballerini	Italy	Astana Qazaqstan Team	29	70	+3h 48' 00"	
33	Lorenzo Fortunato	Italy	Astana Qazaqstan Team	27	12	+26' 44"	
34	Max Kanter	Germany	Astana Qazaqstan Team	26	DNS-10	–	
35	Henok Mulubrhan ‡	Eritrea	Astana Qazaqstan Team	24	47	+2h 33' 34"	
36	Vadim Pronskiy	Kazakhstan	Astana Qazaqstan Team	25	DNS-15	–	
37	Christian Scaroni	Italy	Astana Qazaqstan Team	26	DNS-18	–	
38	Simone Velasco	Italy	Astana Qazaqstan Team	28	32	+2h 00' 00"	
41	Daniel Martínez	Colombia	Bora–Hansgrohe	28	2	+9' 56"	
42	Giovanni Aleotti ‡	Italy	Bora–Hansgrohe	24	24	+1h 13' 03"	
43	Patrick Gamper	Austria	Bora–Hansgrohe	27	86	+4h 14' 45"	
44	Jonas Koch	Germany	Bora–Hansgrohe	30	100	+4h 29' 56"	
45	Florian Lipowitz ‡	Germany	Bora–Hansgrohe	23	DNS-6	–	
46	Ryan Mullen	Ireland	Bora–Hansgrohe	29	131	+5h 35' 48"	
47	Maximilian Schachmann	Germany	Bora–Hansgrohe	30	45	+2h 29' 54"	
48	Danny van Poppel	Netherlands	Bora–Hansgrohe	30	DNS-16	–	
51	Stefano Oldani	Italy	Cofidis	26	DNS-11	–	
52	Stanisław Aniołkowski	Poland	Cofidis	27	129	+5h 30' 35"	
53	Thomas Champion ‡	France	Cofidis	24	55	+2h 27' 59"	
54	Nicolas Debeaumarché	France	Cofidis	26	114	+5h 11' 40"	
55	Rubén Fernández	Spain	Cofidis	33	54	+2h 53' 11"	
56	Simon Geschke	Germany	Cofidis	38	14	+33' 55"	
57	Benjamin Thomas	France	Cofidis	28	DNF-16	–	
58	Harrison Wood ‡	Great Britain	Cofidis	23	66	+3h 34' 36"	
61	Ben O'Connor	Australia	Decathlon–AG2R La Mondiale	28	4	+12' 07"	
62	Alex Baudin ‡	France	Decathlon–AG2R La Mondiale	22	21	+1h 00' 47"	
63	Aurélien Paret-Peintre	France	Decathlon–AG2R La Mondiale	28	26	+1h 22' 55"	
64	Valentin Paret-Peintre ‡	France	Decathlon–AG2R La Mondiale	23	16	+43' 26"	
65	Damien Touzé	France	Decathlon–AG2R La Mondiale	27	69	+3h 46' 43"	
66	Bastien Tronchon ‡	France	Decathlon–AG2R La Mondiale	22	88	+4h 16' 47"	
67	Andrea Vendrame	Italy	Decathlon–AG2R La Mondiale	29	46	+2h 30' 54"	
68	Larry Warbasse	United States	Decathlon–AG2R La Mondiale	33	37	+2h 12' 16"	
71	Esteban Chaves	Colombia	EF Education–EasyPost	34	35	+2h 04' 22"	
72	Jefferson Alexander Cepeda	Ecuador	EF Education–EasyPost	25	71	+3h 51' 59"	
73	Stefan de Bod	South Africa	EF Education–EasyPost	27	80	+4h 04' 01"	
74	Simon Carr	Great Britain	EF Education–EasyPost	25	DNF-3	–	
75	Mikkel Frølich Honoré	Denmark	EF Education–EasyPost	27	62	+3h 18' 52"	
76	Andrea Piccolo ‡	Italy	EF Education–EasyPost	23	DNF-19	–	
77	Georg Steinhauser ‡	Germany	EF Education–EasyPost	22	33	+2h 01' 11"	
78	Michael Valgren	Denmark	EF Education–EasyPost	32	38	+2h 12' 33"	
81	Laurence Pithie ‡	New Zealand	Groupama–FDJ	21	103	+4h 38' 23"	
82	Lewis Askey ‡	Great Britain	Groupama–FDJ	23	93	+4h 21' 30"	
83	Cyril Barthe	France	Groupama–FDJ	28	72	+3h 54' 13"	
84	Clément Davy	France	Groupama–FDJ	25	DNF-15	–	
85	Lorenzo Germani ‡	Italy	Groupama–FDJ	22	87	+4h 16' 21"	
86	Olivier Le Gac	France	Groupama–FDJ	30	133	+5h 39' 13"	
87	Fabien Lienhard	Switzerland	Groupama–FDJ	30	139	+5h 46' 08"	
88	Enzo Paleni ‡	France	Groupama–FDJ	21	56	+3h 00' 47"	
91	Biniam Girmay ‡	Eritrea	Intermarché–Wanty	24	DNF-4	–	
92	Lilian Calmejane	France	Intermarché–Wanty	31	42	+2h 23' 01"	
93	Kevin Colleoni ‡	Italy	Intermarché–Wanty	24	98	+4h 27' 05"	
94	Dries De Pooter ‡	Belgium	Intermarché–Wanty	21	106	+4h 43' 53"	
95	Madis Mihkels ‡	Estonia	Intermarché–Wanty	20	112	+4h 57' 16"	
96	Adrien Petit	France	Intermarché–Wanty	33	DNF-5	–	
97	Dion Smith	New Zealand	Intermarché–Wanty	31	89	+4h 17' 50"	
98	Roel van Sintmaartensdijk ‡	Netherlands	Intermarché–Wanty	22	104	+4h 39' 29"	
101	Michael Woods	Canada	Israel–Premier Tech	37	DNS-6	–	
102	Simon Clarke	Australia	Israel–Premier Tech	37	97	+4h 26' 00"	
103	Marco Frigo ‡	Italy	Israel–Premier Tech	24	44	+2h 28' 33"	
104	Hugo Hofstetter	France	Israel–Premier Tech	30	126	+5h 25' 50"	
105	Riley Pickrell ‡	Canada	Israel–Premier Tech	22	DNS-6	–	
106	Nadav Raisberg ‡	Israel	Israel–Premier Tech	23	DNS-6	–	
107	Nick Schultz	Australia	Israel–Premier Tech	29	DNS-19	–	
109	Ethan Vernon ‡	Great Britain	Israel–Premier Tech	23	DNS-10	–	
111	Jonathan Milan ‡	Italy	Lidl–Trek	23	118	+5h 18' 49"	
112	Andrea Bagioli ‡	Italy	Lidl–Trek	25	65	+3h 34' 13"	
113	Simone Consonni	Italy	Lidl–Trek	29	123	+5h 24' 28"	
114	Amanuel Ghebreigzabhier	Eritrea	Lidl–Trek	29	63	+3h 20' 43"	
115	Daan Hoole ‡	Netherlands	Lidl–Trek	25	132	+5h 37' 50"	
116	Juan Pedro López	Spain	Lidl–Trek	26	39	+2h 13' 11"	
117	Jasper Stuyven	Belgium	Lidl–Trek	32	92	+4h 20' 07"	
118	Edward Theuns	Belgium	Lidl–Trek	33	113	+5h 11? 21"	
121	Nairo Quintana	Colombia	Movistar Team	34	19	+54' 37"	
122	Will Barta	United States	Movistar Team	28	50	+2h 44' 15"	
123	Davide Cimolai	Italy	Movistar Team	34	134	+5h 39' 49"	
124	Fernando Gaviria	Colombia	Movistar Team	29	137	+5h 42' 54"	
125	Lorenzo Milesi ‡	Italy	Movistar Team	22	85	+4h 13' 21"	
126	Einer Rubio	Colombia	Movistar Team	26	7	+15' 52"	
127	Pelayo Sánchez ‡	Spain	Movistar Team	24	40	+2h 14' 44"	
128	Albert Torres	Spain	Movistar Team	34	68	+3h 38' 37"	
131	Julian Alaphilippe	France	Soudal–Quick-Step	31	48	+2h 35' 58"	
132	Josef Černý	Czechia	Soudal–Quick-Step	30	141	+5h 55' 35"	
133	Jan Hirt	Czechia	Soudal–Quick-Step	33	8	+18' 05"	
134	Luke Lamperti ‡	United States	Soudal–Quick-Step	21	117	+5h 15' 06"	
135	Tim Merlier	Belgium	Soudal–Quick-Step	31	138	+5h 46' 04"	
136	Pieter Serry	Belgium	Soudal–Quick-Step	35	78	+4h 00' 53"	
137	Bert Van Lerberghe	Belgium	Soudal–Quick-Step	31	135	+5h 40' 20"	
138	Mauri Vansevenant ‡	Belgium	Soudal–Quick-Step	24	30	+1h 47' 43"	
141	Romain Bardet	France	Team dsm–firmenich PostNL	33	9	+20' 32"	
142	Tobias Lund Andresen ‡	Denmark	Team dsm–firmenich PostNL	21	140	+5h 49' 25"	
143	Chris Hamilton	Australia	Team dsm–firmenich PostNL	28	36	+2h 07' 50"	
144	Fabio Jakobsen	Netherlands	Team dsm–firmenich PostNL	27	DNS-12	–	
145	Gijs Leemreize ‡	Netherlands	Team dsm–firmenich PostNL	24	43	+2h 24' 58"	
146	Julius van den Berg	Netherlands	Team dsm–firmenich PostNL	27	DNF-16	–	
147	Kevin Vermaerke ‡	United States	Team dsm–firmenich PostNL	23	29	+1h 33' 41"	
148	Bram Welten	Netherlands	Team dsm–firmenich PostNL	27	DNS-4	–	
151	Alessandro De Marchi	Italy	Team Jayco–AlUla	37	51	+2h 47' 06"	
152	Eddie Dunbar	Ireland	Team Jayco–AlUla	27	DNS-3	–	
153	Caleb Ewan	Australia	Team Jayco–AlUla	29	120	+5h 20' 01"	
154	Michael Hepburn	Australia	Team Jayco–AlUla	32	115	+5h 11' 49"	
155	Luka Mezgec	Slovenia	Team Jayco–AlUla	35	DNS-14	–	
156	Luke Plapp ‡	Australia	Team Jayco–AlUla	23	52	+2h 52' 59"	
157	Max Walscheid	Germany	Team Jayco–AlUla	30	127	+5h 26' 34"	
158	Filippo Zana ‡	Italy	Team Jayco–AlUla	25	11	+23' 59"	
161	Matteo Fabbro	Italy	Polti–Kometa	29	94	+4h 22' 04"	
162	Davide Bais	Italy	Polti–Kometa	26	76	+3h 58' 26"	
163	Mattia Bais	Italy	Polti–Kometa	27	61	+3h 12' 08"	
164	Giovanni Lonardi	Italy	Polti–Kometa	27	128	+5h 29' 14"	
165	Mirco Maestri	Italy	Polti–Kometa	32	60	+3h 11' 01"	
166	Francisco Muñoz ‡	Spain	Polti–Kometa	22	122	+5h 21' 56"	
167	Andrea Pietrobon ‡	Italy	Polti–Kometa	25	109	+4h 53' 44"	
168	Davide Piganzoli ‡	Italy	Polti–Kometa	21	13	+32' 23"	
171	Christophe Laporte	France	Visma–Lease a Bike	31	DNS-8	–	
172	Edoardo Affini	Italy	Visma–Lease a Bike	27	130	+5h 30' 59"	
173	Robert Gesink	Netherlands	Visma–Lease a Bike	37	DNS-2	–	
174	Olav Kooij ‡	Netherlands	Visma–Lease a Bike	22	DNS-10	–	
175	Jan Tratnik	Slovenia	Visma–Lease a Bike	34	34	+2h 04' 11"	
176	Cian Uijtdebroeks ‡	Belgium	Visma–Lease a Bike	21	DNS-11	–	
177	Attila Valter	Hungary	Visma–Lease a Bike	25	22	+1h 04' 46"	
178	Tim van Dijke ‡	Netherlands	Visma–Lease a Bike	24	105	+4h 43' 29"	
181	Matteo Trentin	Italy	Tudor Pro Cycling Team	34	82	+4h 07' 41"	
182	Alberto Dainese	Italy	Tudor Pro Cycling Team	26	116	+5h 14' 20"	
183	Robin Froidevaux	Switzerland	Tudor Pro Cycling Team	25	136	+5h 41' 04"	
184	Alexander Kamp	Denmark	Tudor Pro Cycling Team	30	110	+4h 54' 18"	
185	Alexander Krieger	Germany	Tudor Pro Cycling Team	32	DNF-9	–	
186	Marius Mayrhofer ‡	Germany	Tudor Pro Cycling Team	23	DNS-10	–	
187	Michael Storer	Australia	Tudor Pro Cycling Team	27	10	+21' 11"	
188	Florian Stork	Germany	Tudor Pro Cycling Team	27	74	+3h 54' 30"	
191	Tadej Pogačar	Slovenia	UAE Team Emirates	25	1	79h 14' 03"	
192	Rui Oliveira	Portugal	UAE Team Emirates	27	121	+5h 21' 05"	
193	Mikkel Bjerg	Denmark	UAE Team Emirates	25	108	+4h 52' 11"	
194	Felix Großschartner	Austria	UAE Team Emirates	30	31	1h 56' 06"	
195	Vegard Stake Laengen	Norway	UAE Team Emirates	35	75	+3h 56' 58"	
196	Rafał Majka	Poland	UAE Team Emirates	34	15	+37' 05"	
197	Juan Sebastián Molano	Colombia	UAE Team Emirates	29	125	+5h 25' 08"	
198	Domen Novak	Slovenia	UAE Team Emirates	28	67	+3h 36' 45"	
201	Domenico Pozzovivo	Italy	VF Group–Bardiani–CSF–Faizanè	41	20	+56' 32"	
202	Luca Covili	Italy	VF Group–Bardiani–CSF–Faizanè	27	18	+51' 08"	
203	Filippo Fiorelli	Italy	VF Group–Bardiani–CSF–Faizanè	29	77	+4h 00' 18"	
204	Martin Marcellusi ‡	Italy	VF Group–Bardiani–CSF–Faizanè	24	99	+4h 29' 28"	
205	Giulio Pellizzari ‡	Italy	VF Group–Bardiani–CSF–Faizanè	20	49	+2h 42' 10"	
206	Manuele Tarozzi	Italy	VF Group–Bardiani–CSF–Faizanè	25	102	+4h 38' 06"	
207	Alessandro Tonelli	Italy	VF Group–Bardiani–CSF–Faizanè	31	41	+2h 17' 48"	
208	Enrico Zanoncello	Italy	VF Group–Bardiani–CSF–Faizanè	26	124	+5h 24' 52"	
211	Antonio Tiberi ‡	Italy	Team Bahrain Victorious	22	5	+12' 49"	
212	Rainer Kepplinger	Austria	Team Bahrain Victorious	26	64	+3h 23' 14"	
213	Phil Bauhaus	Germany	Team Bahrain Victorious	29	DNS-14	–	
214	Damiano Caruso	Italy	Team Bahrain Victorious	36	17	+48' 16"	
215	Andrea Pasqualon	Italy	Team Bahrain Victorious	36	81	+4h 07' 30"	
216	Edoardo Zambanini ‡	Italy	Team Bahrain Victorious	23	27	+1h 25' 56"	
217	Jasha Sütterlin	Germany	Team Bahrain Victorious	31	57	+3h 04' 32"	
218	Torstein Træen	Norway	Team Bahrain Victorious	28	DNF-4	–	

=== By team ===
(United Kingdom) Ineos Grenadiers (IGD)
No.	Rider	Pos.
1	Geraint Thomas (GBR)	3
2	Thymen Arensman (NED)	6
3	Tobias Foss (NOR)	79
4	Filippo Ganna (ITA)	101
5	Jhonatan Narváez (ECU)	28
6	Magnus Sheffield (USA)	59
7	Ben Swift (GBR)	58
8	Connor Swift (GBR)	83

(Belgium) Alpecin–Deceuninck (ADC)
No.	Rider	Pos.
11	Kaden Groves (AUS)	91
12	Tobias Bayer (AUT)	96
13	Nicola Conci (ITA)	23
14	Quinten Hermans (BEL)	53
15	Jimmy Janssens (BEL)	84
16	Timo Kielich (BEL)	111
17	Edward Planckaert (BEL)	95
18	Fabio Van den Bossche (BEL)	107

(France) Arkéa–B&B Hotels (ARK)
No.	Rider	Pos.
21	Jenthe Biermans (BEL)	DNS-16
22	Louis Barré (FRA)	DNS-11
23	Ewen Costiou (FRA)	90
24	David Dekker (NED)	DNF-17
25	Donavan Grondin (FRA)	119
26	Michel Ries (LUX)	25
27	Alan Riou (FRA)	142
28	Alessandro Verre (ITA)	73

(Kazakhstan) Astana Qazaqstan Team (AST)
No.	Rider	Pos.
31	Alexey Lutsenko (KAZ)	DNS-9
32	Davide Ballerini (ITA)	70
33	Lorenzo Fortunato (ITA)	12
34	Max Kanter (GER)	DNS-10
35	Henok Mulubrhan (ERI)	47
36	Vadim Pronskiy (KAZ)	DNS-15
37	Christian Scaroni (ITA)	DNS-18
38	Simone Velasco (ITA)	32

(Germany) Bora–Hansgrohe (BOH)
No.	Rider	Pos.
41	Daniel Martínez (COL)	2
42	Giovanni Aleotti (ITA)	24
43	Patrick Gamper (AUT)	86
44	Jonas Koch (GER)	100
45	Florian Lipowitz (GER)	DNS-6
46	Ryan Mullen (IRL)	131
47	Maximilian Schachmann (GER)	45
48	Danny van Poppel (NED)	DNS-16

(France) Cofidis (COF)
No.	Rider	Pos.
51	Stefano Oldani (ITA)	DNS-11
52	Stanisław Aniołkowski (POL)	129
53	Thomas Champion (FRA)	55
54	Nicolas Debeaumarché (FRA)	114
55	Rubén Fernández (ESP)	54
56	Simon Geschke (GER)	14
57	Benjamin Thomas (FRA)	DNF-16
58	Harrison Wood (GBR)	66

(France) Decathlon–AG2R La Mondiale (DAT)
No.	Rider	Pos.
61	Ben O'Connor (AUS)	4
62	Alex Baudin (FRA)	21
63	Aurélien Paret-Peintre (FRA)	26
64	Valentin Paret-Peintre (FRA)	16
65	Damien Touzé (FRA)	69
66	Bastien Tronchon (FRA)	88
67	Andrea Vendrame (ITA)	46
68	Larry Warbasse (USA)	37

(United States) EF Education–EasyPost (EFE)
No.	Rider	Pos.
71	Esteban Chaves (COL)	35
72	Jefferson Alexander Cepeda (ECU)	71
73	Stefan de Bod (RSA)	80
74	Simon Carr (GBR)	DNF-3
75	Mikkel Frølich Honoré (DEN)	62
76	Andrea Piccolo (ITA)	DNF-19
77	Georg Steinhauser (GER)	33
78	Michael Valgren (DEN)	38

(France) Groupama–FDJ (GFC)
No.	Rider	Pos.
81	Laurence Pithie (NZL)	103
82	Lewis Askey (GBR)	93
83	Cyril Barthe (FRA)	72
84	Clément Davy (FRA)	DNF-15
85	Lorenzo Germani (ITA)	87
86	Olivier Le Gac (FRA)	133
87	Fabien Lienhard (SUI)	139
88	Enzo Paleni (FRA)	56

(Belgium) Intermarché–Wanty (IWA)
No.	Rider	Pos.
91	Biniam Girmay (ERI)	DNF-4
92	Lilian Calmejane (FRA)	42
93	Kevin Colleoni (ITA)	98
94	Madis Mihkels (EST)	112
95	Dries De Pooter (BEL)	106
96	Adrien Petit (FRA)	DNF-5
97	Dion Smith (NZL)	89
98	Roel van Sintmaartensdijk (NED)	104

Israel–Premier Tech (IPT)
No.	Rider	Pos.
101	Michael Woods (CAN)	DNS-6
102	Simon Clarke (AUS)	97
103	Marco Frigo (ITA)	44
104	Hugo Hofstetter (FRA)	126
105	Riley Pickrell (CAN)	DNS-6
106	Nadav Raisberg (ISR)	DNS-6
107	Nick Schultz (AUS)	DNS-19
109	Ethan Vernon (GBR)	DNS-10

(United States) Lidl–Trek (LTK)
No.	Rider	Pos.
111	Jonathan Milan (ITA)	118
112	Andrea Bagioli (ITA)	65
113	Simone Consonni (ITA)	123
114	Amanuel Ghebreigzabhier (ERI)	63
115	Daan Hoole (NED)	132
116	Juan Pedro López (ESP)	39
117	Jasper Stuyven (BEL)	92
118	Edward Theuns (BEL)	113

(Spain) Movistar Team (MOV)
No.	Rider	Pos.
121	Nairo Quintana (COL)	19
122	Will Barta (USA)	50
123	Davide Cimolai (ITA)	134
124	Fernando Gaviria (COL)	137
125	Lorenzo Milesi (ITA)	85
126	Einer Rubio (COL)	7
127	Pelayo Sánchez (ESP)	40
128	Albert Torres (ESP)	68

(Belgium) Soudal–Quick-Step (SOQ)
No.	Rider	Pos.
131	Julian Alaphilippe (FRA)	48
132	Josef Černý (CZE)	141
133	Jan Hirt (CZE)	8
134	Luke Lamperti (USA)	117
135	Tim Merlier (BEL)	138
136	Pieter Serry (BEL)	78
137	Bert Van Lerberghe (BEL)	135
138	Mauri Vansevenant (BEL)	30

(Netherlands) Team dsm–firmenich PostNL (DFP)
No.	Rider	Pos.
141	Romain Bardet (FRA)	9
142	Tobias Lund Andresen (DEN)	140
143	Chris Hamilton (AUS)	36
144	Fabio Jakobsen (NED)	DNS-12
145	Gijs Leemreize (NED)	43
146	Julius van den Berg (NED)	DNF-16
147	Kevin Vermaerke (USA)	29
148	Bram Welten (NED)	DNS-4

(Australia) Team Jayco–AlUla (JAY)
No.	Rider	Pos.
151	Alessandro De Marchi (ITA)	51
152	Eddie Dunbar (IRL)	DNS-3
153	Caleb Ewan (AUS)	120
154	Michael Hepburn (AUS)	115
155	Luka Mezgec (SLO)	DNS-14
156	Luke Plapp (AUS)	52
157	Max Walscheid (GER)	127
158	Filippo Zana (ITA)	11

(Italy) Polti–Kometa (PTK)
No.	Rider	Pos.
161	Matteo Fabbro (ITA)	94
162	Davide Bais (ITA)	76
163	Mattia Bais (ITA)	61
164	Giovanni Lonardi (ITA)	128
165	Mirco Maestri (ITA)	60
166	Francisco Muñoz (ESP)	122
167	Andrea Pietrobon (ITA)	109
168	Davide Piganzoli (ITA)	13

(Netherlands) Visma–Lease a Bike (TVL)
No.	Rider	Pos.
171	Christophe Laporte (FRA)	DNS-8
172	Edoardo Affini (ITA)	130
173	Robert Gesink (NED)	DNS-2
174	Olav Kooij (NED)	DNS-10
175	Jan Tratnik (SLO)	34
176	Cian Uijtdebroeks (BEL)	DNS-11
177	Attila Valter (HUN)	22
178	Tim van Dijke (NED)	105

(Switzerland) Tudor Pro Cycling Team (TUD)
No.	Rider	Pos.
181	Matteo Trentin (ITA)	82
182	Alberto Dainese (ITA)	116
183	Robin Froidevaux (SUI)	136
184	Alexander Kamp (DEN)	110
185	Alexander Krieger (GER)	DNF-9
186	Marius Mayrhofer (GER)	DNS-10
187	Michael Storer (AUS)	10
188	Florian Stork (GER)	74

(United Arab Emirates) UAE Team Emirates (UAD)
No.	Rider	Pos.
191	Tadej Pogačar (SLO)	1
192	Rui Oliveira (POR)	121
193	Mikkel Bjerg (DEN)	108
194	Felix Großschartner (AUT)	31
195	Vegard Stake Laengen (NOR)	75
196	Rafał Majka (POL)	15
197	Juan Sebastián Molano (COL)	125
198	Domen Novak (SLO)	67

(Italy) VF Group–Bardiani–CSF–Faizanè (VBF)
No.	Rider	Pos.
201	Domenico Pozzovivo (ITA)	20
202	Luca Covili (ITA)	18
203	Filippo Fiorelli (ITA)	77
204	Martin Marcellusi (ITA)	99
205	Giulio Pellizzari (ITA)	49
206	Manuele Tarozzi (ITA)	102
207	Alessandro Tonelli (ITA)	41
208	Enrico Zanoncello (ITA)	124

Team Bahrain Victorious (TBV)
No.	Rider	Pos.
211	Antonio Tiberi (ITA)	5
212	Rainer Kepplinger (AUT)	64
213	Phil Bauhaus (GER)	DNS-14
214	Damiano Caruso (ITA)	17
215	Andrea Pasqualon (ITA)	81
216	Edoardo Zambanini (ITA)	27
217	Jasha Sütterlin (GER)	57
218	Torstein Træen (NOR)	DNF-4

=== By nationality ===
Country	No. of riders	Finished	Stage wins
Australia	9	8	
Austria	4	4	
Belgium	14	12	3 (Tim Merlier x3)
Canada	2	0	
Colombia	6	6	
Czechia	2	2	
Denmark	5	5	
Ecuador	2	2	1 (Jhonatan Narváez)
Eritrea	3	2	
Estonia	1	1	
France	22	17	3 (Julian Alaphilippe, Valentin Paret-Peintre, Benjamin Thomas)
Germany	12	7	1 (Georg Steinhauser)
Great Britain	7	5	
Hungary	1	1	
Ireland	2	1	
Israel	1	0	
Italy	43	40	5 (Filippo Ganna, Jonathan Milan x3, Andrea Vendrame)
Kazakhstan	2	0	
Luxembourg	1	1	
Netherlands	12	5	1 (Olav Kooij)
New Zealand	2	2	
Norway	3	2	
Poland	2	2	
Portugal	1	1	
Slovenia	4	3	6 (Tadej Pogačar x6)
South Africa	1	1	
Spain	5	5	1 (Pelayo Sánchez)
Switzerland	2	2	
United States	5	5	
Total	176	142	21
