= 2024 Giro d'Italia, Stage 12 to Stage 21 =

Cycling results

The 2024 Giro d'Italia is the 107th edition of the Giro d'Italia, one of cycling's Grand Tours. The Giro began in Venaria Reale on 4 May, and Stage 12 will occur on 16 May with a stage to Fano. The race will finish in Rome on 26 May.

== Classification standings ==
Legend
| Denotes the leader of the general classification | Denotes the leader of the mountains classification |
| Denotes the leader of the points classification | Denotes the leader of the young rider classification |
| Denotes the winner of the combativity award | Denotes the leader of the intergiro classification |

== Stage 12 ==
16 May 2024 — Martinsicuro to Fano, 193 km (120 mi)

Stage 12 Result
| Rank | Rider | Team | Time |
|---|---|---|---|
| 1 | Julian Alaphilippe (FRA) | Soudal–Quick-Step | 4h 07' 44" |
| 2 | Jhonatan Narváez (ECU) | INEOS Grenadiers | + 31" |
| 3 | Quinten Hermans (BEL) | Alpecin–Deceuninck | + 32" |
| 4 | Michael Valgren (DEN) | EF Education–EasyPost | + 43" |
| 5 | Christian Scaroni (ITA) | Astana Qazaqstan Team | + 43" |
| 6 | Matteo Trentin (ITA) | Tudor Pro Cycling Team | + 1' 30" |
| 7 | Simon Clarke (AUS) | Israel–Premier Tech | + 1' 30" |
| 8 | Gijs Leemreize (NED) | Team dsm–firmenich PostNL | + 1' 30" |
| 9 | Mirco Maestri (ITA) | Polti–Kometa | + 1' 30" |
| 10 | Benjamin Thomas (FRA) | Cofidis | + 1' 30" |

General classification after Stage 12
| Rank | Rider | Team | Time |
|---|---|---|---|
| 1 | Tadej Pogačar (SLO) | UAE Team Emirates | 45h 22' 35" |
| 2 | Daniel Martínez (COL) | Bora–Hansgrohe | + 2' 40" |
| 3 | Geraint Thomas (GBR) | INEOS Grenadiers | + 2' 56" |
| 4 | Ben O'Connor (AUS) | Decathlon–AG2R La Mondiale | + 3' 39" |
| 5 | Antonio Tiberi (ITA) | Team Bahrain Victorious | + 4' 27" |
| 6 | Romain Bardet (FRA) | Team dsm–firmenich PostNL | + 4' 57" |
| 7 | Lorenzo Fortunato (ITA) | Astana Qazaqstan Team | + 5' 19" |
| 8 | Filippo Zana (ITA) | Team Jayco–AlUla | + 5' 23" |
| 9 | Einer Rubio (COL) | Movistar Team | + 5' 28" |
| 10 | Thymen Arensman (NED) | INEOS Grenadiers | + 5' 52" |

== Stage 13 ==
17 May 2024 — Riccione to Cento, 179 km (111 mi)

Stage 13 Result
| Rank | Rider | Team | Time |
|---|---|---|---|
| 1 | Jonathan Milan (ITA) | Lidl–Trek | 4h 02' 03" |
| 2 | Stanisław Aniołkowski (POL) | Cofidis | + 0" |
| 3 | Phil Bauhaus (GER) | Team Bahrain Victorious | + 0" |
| 4 | Tim van Dijke (NED) | Visma–Lease a Bike | + 0" |
| 5 | Hugo Hofstetter (FRA) | Israel–Premier Tech | + 0" |
| 6 | Fernando Gaviria (COL) | Movistar Team | + 0" |
| 7 | Juan Sebastián Molano (COL) | UAE Team Emirates | + 0" |
| 8 | Laurence Pithie (NZL) | Groupama–FDJ | + 0" |
| 9 | Giovanni Lonardi (ITA) | Polti–Kometa | + 0" |
| 10 | Alberto Dainese (ITA) | Tudor Pro Cycling Team | + 0" |

General classification after Stage 13
| Rank | Rider | Team | Time |
|---|---|---|---|
| 1 | Tadej Pogačar (SLO) | UAE Team Emirates | 49h 24' 38" |
| 2 | Daniel Martínez (COL) | Bora–Hansgrohe | + 2' 40" |
| 3 | Geraint Thomas (GBR) | INEOS Grenadiers | + 2' 56" |
| 4 | Ben O'Connor (AUS) | Decathlon–AG2R La Mondiale | + 3' 39" |
| 5 | Antonio Tiberi (ITA) | Team Bahrain Victorious | + 4' 27" |
| 6 | Romain Bardet (FRA) | Team dsm–firmenich PostNL | + 4' 57" |
| 7 | Lorenzo Fortunato (ITA) | Astana Qazaqstan Team | + 5' 19" |
| 8 | Filippo Zana (ITA) | Team Jayco–AlUla | + 5' 23" |
| 9 | Einer Rubio (COL) | Movistar Team | + 5' 28" |
| 10 | Thymen Arensman (NED) | INEOS Grenadiers | + 5' 52" |

== Stage 14 ==
18 May 2024 — Castiglione delle Stiviere to Desenzano del Garda, 31.2 km (19.4 mi) (ITT)

Stage 14 Result
| Rank | Rider | Team | Time |
|---|---|---|---|
| 1 | Filippo Ganna (ITA) | INEOS Grenadiers | 35' 02" |
| 2 | Tadej Pogačar (SLO) | UAE Team Emirates | + 29" |
| 3 | Thymen Arensman (NED) | INEOS Grenadiers | + 1' 07" |
| 4 | Geraint Thomas (GBR) | INEOS Grenadiers | + 1' 14" |
| 5 | Luke Plapp (AUS) | Team Jayco–AlUla | + 1' 18" |
| 6 | Antonio Tiberi (ITA) | Team Bahrain Victorious | + 1' 19" |
| 7 | Ben O'Connor (AUS) | Decathlon–AG2R La Mondiale | + 1' 25" |
| 8 | Tobias Foss (NOR) | INEOS Grenadiers | + 1' 26" |
| 9 | Mikkel Bjerg (DEN) | UAE Team Emirates | + 1' 28" |
| 10 | Edoardo Affini (ITA) | Visma–Lease a Bike | + 1' 30" |

General classification after Stage 14
| Rank | Rider | Team | Time |
|---|---|---|---|
| 1 | Tadej Pogačar (SLO) | UAE Team Emirates | 50h 00' 09" |
| 2 | Geraint Thomas (GBR) | INEOS Grenadiers | + 3' 41" |
| 3 | Daniel Martínez (COL) | Bora–Hansgrohe | + 3' 56" |
| 4 | Ben O'Connor (AUS) | Decathlon–AG2R La Mondiale | + 4' 35" |
| 5 | Antonio Tiberi (ITA) | Team Bahrain Victorious | + 5' 17" |
| 6 | Thymen Arensman (NED) | INEOS Grenadiers | + 6' 30" |
| 7 | Filippo Zana (ITA) | Team Jayco–AlUla | + 7' 26" |
| 8 | Romain Bardet (FRA) | Team dsm–firmenich PostNL | + 7' 52" |
| 9 | Lorenzo Fortunato (ITA) | Astana Qazaqstan Team | + 8' 40" |
| 10 | Alex Baudin (FRA) | Decathlon–AG2R La Mondiale | + 8' 56" |

== Stage 15 ==
19 May 2024 — Manerba del Garda to Livigno, 222 km (138 mi)

Stage 15 Result
| Rank | Rider | Team | Time |
|---|---|---|---|
| 1 | Tadej Pogačar (SLO) | UAE Team Emirates | 6h 11' 43" |
| 2 | Nairo Quintana (COL) | Movistar Team | + 29" |
| 3 | Georg Steinhauser (GER) | EF Education–EasyPost | + 2' 32" |
| 4 | Romain Bardet (FRA) | Team dsm–firmenich PostNL | + 2' 47" |
| 5 | Daniel Martínez (COL) | Bora–Hansgrohe | + 2' 50" |
| 6 | Geraint Thomas (GBR) | INEOS Grenadiers | + 2' 50" |
| 7 | Einer Rubio (COL) | Movistar Team | + 2' 58" |
| 8 | Ben O'Connor (AUS) | Decathlon–AG2R La Mondiale | + 2' 58" |
| 9 | Thymen Arensman (NED) | INEOS Grenadiers | + 3' 05" |
| 10 | Jan Hirt (CZE) | Soudal–Quick-Step | + 3' 20" |

General classification after Stage 15
| Rank | Rider | Team | Time |
|---|---|---|---|
| 1 | Tadej Pogačar (SLO) | UAE Team Emirates | 56h 11' 42" |
| 2 | Geraint Thomas (GBR) | INEOS Grenadiers | + 6' 41" |
| 3 | Daniel Martínez (COL) | Bora–Hansgrohe | + 6' 56" |
| 4 | Ben O'Connor (AUS) | Decathlon–AG2R La Mondiale | + 7' 43" |
| 5 | Antonio Tiberi (ITA) | Team Bahrain Victorious | + 9' 26" |
| 6 | Thymen Arensman (NED) | INEOS Grenadiers | + 9' 45" |
| 7 | Romain Bardet (FRA) | Team dsm–firmenich PostNL | + 10' 49" |
| 8 | Filippo Zana (ITA) | Team Jayco–AlUla | + 11' 11" |
| 9 | Einer Rubio (COL) | Movistar Team | + 12' 13" |
| 10 | Jan Hirt (CZE) | Soudal–Quick-Step | + 13' 11" |

== Rest day 2 ==
20 May 2024 — Livigno

== Stage 16 ==
21 May 2024 — ~~Livigno~~ Laas to Santa Cristina Valgardena (Note: Distance originally was 202 km, then it was rerouted to 206 km. Before the start of the stage, the distance was shortened to 118.7 km due to bad weather conditions.), 118.7 km (73.8 mi)

Stage 16 Result
| Rank | Rider | Team | Time |
|---|---|---|---|
| 1 | Tadej Pogačar (SLO) | UAE Team Emirates | 2h 49' 37" |
| 2 | Giulio Pellizzari (ITA) | VF Group–Bardiani–CSF–Faizanè | + 16" |
| 3 | Daniel Martínez (COL) | Bora–Hansgrohe | + 16" |
| 4 | Christian Scaroni (ITA) | Astana Qazaqstan Team | + 31" |
| 5 | Antonio Tiberi (ITA) | Team Bahrain Victorious | + 33" |
| 6 | Thymen Arensman (NED) | INEOS Grenadiers | + 38" |
| 7 | Damiano Caruso (ITA) | Team Bahrain Victorious | + 39" |
| 8 | Michael Storer (AUS) | Tudor Pro Cycling Team | + 42" |
| 9 | Ewen Costiou (FRA) | Arkéa–B&B Hotels | + 42" |
| 10 | Valentin Paret-Peintre (FRA) | Decathlon–AG2R La Mondiale | + 45" |

General classification after Stage 16
| Rank | Rider | Team | Time |
|---|---|---|---|
| 1 | Tadej Pogačar (SLO) | UAE Team Emirates | 59h 01' 09" |
| 2 | Daniel Martínez (COL) | Bora–Hansgrohe | + 7' 18" |
| 3 | Geraint Thomas (GBR) | INEOS Grenadiers | + 7' 40" |
| 4 | Ben O'Connor (AUS) | Decathlon–AG2R La Mondiale | + 8' 42" |
| 5 | Antonio Tiberi (ITA) | Team Bahrain Victorious | + 10' 09" |
| 6 | Thymen Arensman (NED) | INEOS Grenadiers | + 10' 33" |
| 7 | Romain Bardet (FRA) | Team dsm–firmenich PostNL | + 12' 18" |
| 8 | Filippo Zana (ITA) | Team Jayco–AlUla | + 12' 43" |
| 9 | Einer Rubio (COL) | Movistar Team | + 13' 09" |
| 10 | Jan Hirt (CZE) | Soudal–Quick-Step | + 14' 07" |

== Stage 17 ==
22 May 2024 — Selva di Val Gardena to Passo del Brocon, 159 km (99 mi)

Stage 17 Result
| Rank | Rider | Team | Time |
|---|---|---|---|
| 1 | Georg Steinhauser (GER) | EF Education–EasyPost | 4h 28' 51" |
| 2 | Tadej Pogačar (SLO) | UAE Team Emirates | + 1' 24" |
| 3 | Antonio Tiberi (ITA) | Team Bahrain Victorious | + 1' 42" |
| 4 | Geraint Thomas (GBR) | INEOS Grenadiers | + 1' 42" |
| 5 | Daniel Martínez (COL) | Bora–Hansgrohe | + 1' 42" |
| 6 | Einer Rubio (COL) | Movistar Team | + 1' 42" |
| 7 | Romain Bardet (FRA) | Team dsm–firmenich PostNL | + 1' 42" |
| 8 | Thymen Arensman (NED) | INEOS Grenadiers | + 1' 55" |
| 9 | Jan Hirt (CZE) | Soudal–Quick-Step | + 1' 55" |
| 10 | Rafal Majka (POL) | UAE Team Emirates | + 1' 55" |

General classification after Stage 17
| Rank | Rider | Team | Time |
|---|---|---|---|
| 1 | Tadej Pogačar (SLO) | UAE Team Emirates | 63h 31' 18" |
| 2 | Daniel Martínez (COL) | Bora–Hansgrohe | + 7' 42" |
| 3 | Geraint Thomas (GBR) | INEOS Grenadiers | + 8' 04" |
| 4 | Ben O'Connor (AUS) | Decathlon–AG2R La Mondiale | + 9' 47" |
| 5 | Antonio Tiberi (ITA) | Team Bahrain Victorious | + 10' 29" |
| 6 | Thymen Arensman (NED) | INEOS Grenadiers | + 11' 10" |
| 7 | Romain Bardet (FRA) | Team dsm–firmenich PostNL | + 12' 42" |
| 8 | Einer Rubio (COL) | Movistar Team | + 13' 33" |
| 9 | Filippo Zana (ITA) | Team Jayco–AlUla | + 13' 52" |
| 10 | Jan Hirt (CZE) | Soudal–Quick-Step | + 14' 44" |

== Stage 18 ==
23 May 2024 — Fiera di Primiero to Padua, 178 km (111 mi)

Stage 18 Result
| Rank | Rider | Team | Time |
|---|---|---|---|
| 1 | Tim Merlier (BEL) | Soudal–Quick-Step | 3h 55' 44" |
| 2 | Jonathan Milan (ITA) | Lidl–Trek | + 0" |
| 3 | Kaden Groves (AUS) | Alpecin–Deceuninck | + 0" |
| 4 | Alberto Dainese (ITA) | Tudor Pro Cycling Team | + 0" |
| 5 | Stanisław Aniołkowski (POL) | Cofidis | + 0" |
| 6 | Fernando Gaviria (COL) | Movistar Team | + 0" |
| 7 | Madis Mihkels (EST) | Intermarché–Wanty | + 0" |
| 8 | Caleb Ewan (AUS) | Team Jayco–AlUla | + 0" |
| 9 | Davide Ballerini (ITA) | Astana Qazaqstan Team | + 0" |
| 10 | Juan Sebastián Molano (COL) | UAE Team Emirates | + 0" |

General classification after Stage 18
| Rank | Rider | Team | Time |
|---|---|---|---|
| 1 | Tadej Pogačar (SLO) | UAE Team Emirates | 67h 17' 02" |
| 2 | Daniel Martínez (COL) | Bora–Hansgrohe | + 7' 42" |
| 3 | Geraint Thomas (GBR) | INEOS Grenadiers | + 8' 04" |
| 4 | Ben O'Connor (AUS) | Decathlon–AG2R La Mondiale | + 9' 47" |
| 5 | Antonio Tiberi (ITA) | Team Bahrain Victorious | + 10' 29" |
| 6 | Thymen Arensman (NED) | INEOS Grenadiers | + 11' 10" |
| 7 | Romain Bardet (FRA) | Team dsm–firmenich PostNL | + 12' 42" |
| 8 | Einer Rubio (COL) | Movistar Team | + 13' 33" |
| 9 | Filippo Zana (ITA) | Team Jayco–AlUla | + 13' 52" |
| 10 | Jan Hirt (CZE) | Soudal–Quick-Step | + 14' 44" |

== Stage 19 ==
24 May 2024 — Mortegliano to Sappada, 157 km (98 mi)

Stage 19 Result
| Rank | Rider | Team | Time |
|---|---|---|---|
| 1 | Andrea Vendrame (ITA) | Decathlon–AG2R La Mondiale | 3h 31' 05" |
| 2 | Pelayo Sánchez (ESP) | Movistar Team | + 54" |
| 3 | Georg Steinhauser (GER) | EF Education–EasyPost | + 1' 07" |
| 4 | Jhonatan Narvaez (ECU) | INEOS Grenadiers | + 2' 27" |
| 5 | Lucas Plapp (AUS) | Team Jayco–AlUla | + 2' 27" |
| 6 | Simone Velasco (ITA) | Astana Qazaqstan Team | + 2' 30" |
| 7 | Jan Tratnik (SLO) | Visma–Lease a Bike | + 2' 30" |
| 8 | Michael Valgren (DEN) | EF Education–EasyPost | + 2' 30" |
| 9 | Julian Alaphilippe (FRA) | Soudal–Quick-Step | + 2' 32" |
| 10 | Quinten Hermans (BEL) | Alpecin–Deceuninck | + 3' 52" |

General classification after Stage 19
| Rank | Rider | Team | Time |
|---|---|---|---|
| 1 | Tadej Pogačar (SLO) | UAE Team Emirates | 71h 24' 03" |
| 2 | Daniel Martínez (COL) | Bora–Hansgrohe | + 7' 42" |
| 3 | Geraint Thomas (GBR) | INEOS Grenadiers | + 8' 04" |
| 4 | Ben O'Connor (AUS) | Decathlon–AG2R La Mondiale | + 9' 47" |
| 5 | Antonio Tiberi (ITA) | Team Bahrain Victorious | + 10' 29" |
| 6 | Thymen Arensman (NED) | INEOS Grenadiers | + 11' 10" |
| 7 | Romain Bardet (FRA) | Team dsm–firmenich PostNL | + 12' 42" |
| 8 | Einer Rubio (COL) | Movistar Team | + 13' 33" |
| 9 | Filippo Zana (ITA) | Team Jayco–AlUla | + 13' 52" |
| 10 | Jan Hirt (CZE) | Soudal–Quick-Step | + 14' 44" |

== Stage 20 ==
25 May 2024 — Alpago to Bassano del Grappa, 184 km (114 mi)

Stage 20 Result
| Rank | Rider | Team | Time |
|---|---|---|---|
| 1 | Tadej Pogačar (SLO) | UAE Team Emirates | 4h 58' 23" |
| 2 | Valentin Paret-Peintre (FRA) | Decathlon–AG2R La Mondiale | + 2' 07" |
| 3 | Daniel Martínez (COL) | Bora–Hansgrohe | + 2' 07" |
| 4 | Antonio Tiberi (ITA) | Team Bahrain Victorious | + 2' 07" |
| 5 | Einer Rubio (COL) | Movistar Team | + 2' 07" |
| 6 | Giulio Pellizzari (ITA) | VF Group–Bardiani–CSF–Faizanè | + 2' 07" |
| 7 | Geraint Thomas (GBR) | INEOS Grenadiers | + 2' 07" |
| 8 | Ben O'Connor (AUS) | Decathlon–AG2R La Mondiale | + 2' 07" |
| 9 | Michael Storer (AUS) | Tudor Pro Cycling Team | + 2' 31" |
| 10 | Rafal Majka (POL) | UAE Team Emirates | + 3' 08" |

General classification after Stage 20
| Rank | Rider | Team | Time |
|---|---|---|---|
| 1 | Tadej Pogačar (SLO) | UAE Team Emirates | 76h 22' 13" |
| 2 | Daniel Martínez (COL) | Bora–Hansgrohe | + 9' 56" |
| 3 | Geraint Thomas (GBR) | INEOS Grenadiers | + 10' 24" |
| 4 | Ben O'Connor (AUS) | Decathlon–AG2R La Mondiale | + 12' 07" |
| 5 | Antonio Tiberi (ITA) | Team Bahrain Victorious | + 12' 49" |
| 6 | Thymen Arensman (NED) | INEOS Grenadiers | + 14' 31" |
| 7 | Einer Rubio (COL) | Movistar Team | + 15' 52" |
| 8 | Jan Hirt (CZE) | Soudal–Quick-Step | + 18' 05" |
| 9 | Romain Bardet (FRA) | Team dsm–firmenich PostNL | + 20' 32" |
| 10 | Michael Storer (AUS) | Tudor Pro Cycling Team | + 21' 11" |

== Stage 21 ==
26 May 2024 — Rome to Rome, 125 km (78 mi)

Stage 21 Result
| Rank | Rider | Team | Time |
|---|---|---|---|
| 1 | Tim Merlier (BEL) | Soudal–Quick-Step | 2h 51' 50" |
| 2 | Jonathan Milan (ITA) | Lidl–Trek | + 0" |
| 3 | Kaden Groves (AUS) | Alpecin–Deceuninck | + 0" |
| 4 | Fernando Gaviria (COL) | Movistar Team | + 0" |
| 5 | Tim van Dijke (NED) | Visma–Lease a Bike | + 0" |
| 6 | Stanislaw Aniolkowski (POL) | Cofidis | + 0" |
| 7 | Alberto Dainese (ITA) | Tudor Pro Cycling Team | + 0" |
| 8 | Giovanni Lonardi (ITA) | Polti–Kometa | + 0" |
| 9 | Caleb Ewan (AUS) | Team Jayco–AlUla | + 0" |
| 10 | Donavan Grondin (FRA) | Arkéa–B&B Hotels | + 0" |

General classification after Stage 21
| Rank | Rider | Team | Time |
|---|---|---|---|
| 1 | Tadej Pogačar (SLO) | UAE Team Emirates | 79h 14' 03" |
| 2 | Daniel Martínez (COL) | Bora–Hansgrohe | + 9' 56" |
| 3 | Geraint Thomas (GBR) | INEOS Grenadiers | + 10' 24" |
| 4 | Ben O'Connor (AUS) | Decathlon–AG2R La Mondiale | + 12' 07" |
| 5 | Antonio Tiberi (ITA) | Team Bahrain Victorious | + 12' 49" |
| 6 | Thymen Arensman (NED) | INEOS Grenadiers | + 14' 31" |
| 7 | Einer Rubio (COL) | Movistar Team | + 15' 52" |
| 8 | Jan Hirt (CZE) | Soudal–Quick-Step | + 18' 05" |
| 9 | Romain Bardet (FRA) | Team dsm–firmenich PostNL | + 20' 32" |
| 10 | Michael Storer (AUS) | Tudor Pro Cycling Team | + 21' 11" |
