= 2024 Giro d'Italia, Stage 1 to Stage 11 =

Cycling results

The 2024 Giro d'Italia is the 107th edition of the Giro d'Italia, one of cycling's Grand Tours. The Giro began in Venaria Reale on 4 May, and Stage 11 will occur on 15 May with a stage to Francavilla al Mare. The race will finish in Rome on 26 May.

== Classification standings ==
Legend
Denotes the leader of the general classification	Denotes the leader of the mountains classification
Denotes the leader of the points classification	Denotes the leader of the young rider classification
Denotes the winner of the combativity award	Denotes the leader of the intergiro classification

== Stage 1 ==
4 May 2024 — Venaria Reale to Turin, 140 km (87 mi)

Stage 1 Result
Rank	Rider	Team	Time
1	Jhonatan Narváez (ECU)	INEOS Grenadiers	3h 14' 23"
2	Maximilian Schachmann (GER)	Bora–Hansgrohe	+ 0"
3	Tadej Pogačar (SLO)	UAE Team Emirates	+ 0"
4	Alex Baudin (FRA)	Decathlon–AG2R La Mondiale	+ 6"
5	Nicola Conci (ITA)	Alpecin–Deceuninck	+ 10"
6	Quinten Hermans (BEL)	Alpecin–Deceuninck	+ 10"
7	Mauri Vansevenant (BEL)	Soudal–Quick-Step	+ 10"
8	Antonio Tiberi (ITA)	Team Bahrain Victorious	+ 10"
9	Attila Valter (HUN)	Visma–Lease a Bike	+ 10"
10	Geraint Thomas (GBR)	INEOS Grenadiers	+ 10"

General classification after Stage 1
Rank	Rider	Team	Time
1	Jhonatan Narváez (ECU)	INEOS Grenadiers	3h 14' 23"
2	Maximilian Schachmann (GER)	Bora–Hansgrohe	+ 3"
3	Tadej Pogačar (SLO)	UAE Team Emirates	+ 6"
4	Alex Baudin (FRA)	Decathlon–AG2R La Mondiale	+ 16"
5	Damiano Caruso (ITA)	Team Bahrain Victorious	+ 17"
6	Nicola Conci (ITA)	Alpecin–Deceuninck	+ 18"
7	Quinten Hermans (BEL)	Alpecin–Deceuninck	+ 20"
8	Mauri Vansevenant (BEL)	Soudal–Quick-Step	+ 20"
9	Antonio Tiberi (ITA)	Team Bahrain Victorious	+ 20"
10	Attila Valter (HUN)	Visma–Lease a Bike	+ 20"

== Stage 2 ==
5 May 2024 — San Francesco al Campo to Santuario di Oropa (Biella), 161 km (100 mi)

Stage 2 Result
Rank	Rider	Team	Time
1	Tadej Pogačar (SLO)	UAE Team Emirates	3h 54' 20"
2	Daniel Martínez (COL)	Bora–Hansgrohe	+ 27"
3	Geraint Thomas (GBR)	INEOS Grenadiers	+ 27"
4	Lorenzo Fortunato (ITA)	Astana Qazaqstan Team	+ 27"
5	Florian Lipowitz (GER)	Bora–Hansgrohe	+ 27"
6	Michael Storer (AUS)	Tudor Pro Cycling Team	+ 30"
7	Cian Uijtdebroeks (BEL)	Visma–Lease a Bike	+ 30"
8	Einer Rubio (COL)	Movistar Team	+ 30"
9	Juan Pedro López (ESP)	Lidl–Trek	+ 35"
10	Jan Hirt (CZE)	Soudal–Quick-Step	+ 37"

General classification after Stage 2
Rank	Rider	Team	Time
1	Tadej Pogačar (SLO)	UAE Team Emirates	7h 08' 29"
2	Geraint Thomas (GBR)	INEOS Grenadiers	+ 45"
3	Daniel Martínez (COL)	Bora–Hansgrohe	+ 45"
4	Cian Uijtdebroeks (BEL)	Visma–Lease a Bike	+ 54"
5	Einer Rubio (COL)	Movistar Team	+ 54"
6	Lorenzo Fortunato (ITA)	Astana Qazaqstan Team	+ 1' 05"
7	Juan Pedro López (ESP)	Lidl–Trek	+ 1' 09"
8	Jan Hirt (CZE)	Soudal–Quick-Step	+ 1' 11"
9	Esteban Chaves (COL)	EF Education–EasyPost	+ 1' 24"
10	Ben O'Connor (AUS)	Decathlon–AG2R La Mondiale	+ 1' 24"

== Stage 3 ==
6 May 2024 — Novara to Fossano, 166 km (103 mi)

Stage 3 Result
Rank	Rider	Team	Time
1	Tim Merlier (BEL)	Soudal–Quick-Step	3h 54' 35"
2	Jonathan Milan (ITA)	Lidl–Trek	+ 0"
3	Biniam Girmay (ERI)	Intermarché–Wanty	+ 0"
4	Jenthe Biermans (BEL)	Arkéa–B&B Hotels	+ 0"
5	Tobias Lund Andresen (DEN)	Team dsm–firmenich PostNL	+ 0"
6	Olav Kooij (NED)	Visma–Lease a Bike	+ 0"
7	Ethan Vernon (GBR)	Israel–Premier Tech	+ 0"
8	Stanisław Aniołkowski (POL)	Cofidis	+ 0"
9	Fernando Gaviria (COL)	Movistar Team	+ 0"
10	Alberto Dainese (ITA)	Tudor Pro Cycling Team	+ 0"

General classification after Stage 3
Rank	Rider	Team	Time
1	Tadej Pogačar (SLO)	UAE Team Emirates	11h 03' 02"
2	Geraint Thomas (GBR)	INEOS Grenadiers	+ 46"
3	Daniel Martínez (COL)	Bora–Hansgrohe	+ 47"
4	Einer Rubio (COL)	Movistar Team	+ 56"
5	Cian Uijtdebroeks (BEL)	Visma–Lease a Bike	+ 56"
6	Lorenzo Fortunato (ITA)	Astana Qazaqstan Team	+ 1' 07"
7	Juan Pedro López (ESP)	Lidl–Trek	+ 1' 11"
8	Jan Hirt (CZE)	Soudal–Quick-Step	+ 1' 13"
9	Alexey Lutsenko (KAZ)	Astana Qazaqstan Team	+ 1' 26"
10	Ben O'Connor (AUS)	Decathlon–AG2R La Mondiale	+ 1' 26"

== Stage 4 ==
7 May 2024 — Acqui Terme to Andora, 190 km (120 mi)

Stage 4 Result
Rank	Rider	Team	Time
1	Jonathan Milan (ITA)	Lidl–Trek	4h 16' 03"
2	Kaden Groves (AUS)	Alpecin–Deceuninck	+ 0"
3	Phil Bauhaus (GER)	Team Bahrain Victorious	+ 0"
4	Olav Kooij (NED)	Visma–Lease a Bike	+ 0"
5	Tim Merlier (BEL)	Soudal–Quick-Step	+ 0"
6	Davide Ballerini (ITA)	Astana Qazaqstan Team	+ 0"
7	Fernando Gaviria (COL)	Movistar Team	+ 0"
8	Enrico Zanoncello (ITA)	VF Group–Bardiani–CSF–Faizanè	+ 0"
9	Madis Mihkels (EST)	Intermarché–Wanty	+ 0"
10	Giovanni Lonardi (ITA)	Polti–Kometa	+ 0"

General classification after Stage 4
Rank	Rider	Team	Time
1	Tadej Pogačar (SLO)	UAE Team Emirates	15h 19' 05"
2	Geraint Thomas (GBR)	INEOS Grenadiers	+ 46"
3	Daniel Martínez (COL)	Bora–Hansgrohe	+ 47"
4	Cian Uijtdebroeks (BEL)	Visma–Lease a Bike	+ 55"
5	Einer Rubio (COL)	Movistar Team	+ 56"
6	Lorenzo Fortunato (ITA)	Astana Qazaqstan Team	+ 1' 07"
7	Juan Pedro López (ESP)	Lidl–Trek	+ 1' 11"
8	Jan Hirt (CZE)	Soudal–Quick-Step	+ 1' 13"
9	Alexey Lutsenko (KAZ)	Astana Qazaqstan Team	+ 1' 26"
10	Esteban Chaves (COL)	EF Education–EasyPost	+ 1' 26"

== Stage 5 ==
8 May 2024 — Genoa to Lucca, 178 km (111 mi)

Stage 5 Result
Rank	Rider	Team	Time
1	Benjamin Thomas (FRA)	Cofidis	3h 59' 59"
2	Michael Valgren (DEN)	EF Education–EasyPost	+ 0"
3	Andrea Pietrobon (ITA)	Polti–Kometa	+ 0"
4	Enzo Paleni (FRA)	Groupama–FDJ	+ 3"
5	Jonathan Milan (ITA)	Lidl–Trek	+ 11"
6	Caleb Ewan (AUS)	Team Jayco–AlUla	+ 11"
7	Phil Bauhaus (GER)	Team Bahrain Victorious	+ 11"
8	Tim Merlier (BEL)	Soudal–Quick-Step	+ 11"
9	Olav Kooij (NED)	Visma–Lease a Bike	+ 11"
10	Madis Mihkels (EST)	Intermarché–Wanty	+ 11"

General classification after Stage 5
Rank	Rider	Team	Time
1	Tadej Pogačar (SLO)	UAE Team Emirates	19h 19' 15"
2	Geraint Thomas (GBR)	INEOS Grenadiers	+ 46"
3	Daniel Martínez (COL)	Bora–Hansgrohe	+ 47"
4	Cian Uijtdebroeks (BEL)	Visma–Lease a Bike	+ 55"
5	Einer Rubio (COL)	Movistar Team	+ 56"
6	Lorenzo Fortunato (ITA)	Astana Qazaqstan Team	+ 1' 07"
7	Juan Pedro López (ESP)	Lidl–Trek	+ 1' 11"
8	Jan Hirt (CZE)	Soudal–Quick-Step	+ 1' 13"
9	Alexey Lutsenko (KAZ)	Astana Qazaqstan Team	+ 1' 26"
10	Esteban Chaves (COL)	EF Education–EasyPost	+ 1' 26"

== Stage 6 ==
9 May 2024 — Viareggio to Rapolano Terme, 180 km (110 mi)

Stage 6 Result
Rank	Rider	Team	Time
1	Pelayo Sánchez (ESP)	Movistar Team	4h 01' 08"
2	Julian Alaphilippe (FRA)	Soudal–Quick-Step	+ 0"
3	Luke Plapp (AUS)	Team Jayco–AlUla	+ 1"
4	Andrea Piccolo (ITA)	EF Education–EasyPost	+ 24"
5	Jhonatan Narváez (ECU)	INEOS Grenadiers	+ 29"
6	Luka Mezgec (SLO)	Team Jayco–AlUla	+ 29"
7	Quinten Hermans (BEL)	Alpecin–Deceuninck	+ 29"
8	Nick Schultz (AUS)	Israel–Premier Tech	+ 29"
9	Daniel Martínez (COL)	Bora–Hansgrohe	+ 29"
10	Alexey Lutsenko (KAZ)	Astana Qazaqstan Team	+ 29"

General classification after Stage 6
Rank	Rider	Team	Time
1	Tadej Pogačar (SLO)	UAE Team Emirates	23h 20' 52"
2	Geraint Thomas (GBR)	INEOS Grenadiers	+ 46"
3	Daniel Martínez (COL)	Bora–Hansgrohe	+ 47"
4	Cian Uijtdebroeks (BEL)	Visma–Lease a Bike	+ 55"
5	Einer Rubio (COL)	Movistar Team	+ 56"
6	Lorenzo Fortunato (ITA)	Astana Qazaqstan Team	+ 1' 07"
7	Juan Pedro López (ESP)	Lidl–Trek	+ 1' 11"
8	Jan Hirt (CZE)	Soudal–Quick-Step	+ 1' 13"
9	Alexey Lutsenko (KAZ)	Astana Qazaqstan Team	+ 1' 26"
10	Esteban Chaves (COL)	EF Education–EasyPost	+ 1' 26"

== Stage 7 ==
10 May 2024 — Foligno to Perugia, 40.6 km (25.2 mi) (ITT)

Stage 7 Result
Rank	Rider	Team	Time
1	Tadej Pogačar (SLO)	UAE Team Emirates	51' 44"
2	Filippo Ganna (ITA)	INEOS Grenadiers	+ 17"
3	Magnus Sheffield (USA)	INEOS Grenadiers	+ 49"
4	Thymen Arensman (NED)	INEOS Grenadiers	+ 1' 00"
5	Maximilian Schachmann (GER)	Bora–Hansgrohe	+ 1' 05"
6	Antonio Tiberi (ITA)	Team Bahrain Victorious	+ 1' 21"
7	Luke Plapp (AUS)	Team Jayco–AlUla	+ 1' 45"
8	Daniel Martínez (COL)	Bora–Hansgrohe	+ 1' 49"
9	Mikkel Bjerg (DEN)	UAE Team Emirates	+ 1' 56"
10	Geraint Thomas (GBR)	INEOS Grenadiers	+ 2' 00"

General classification after Stage 7
Rank	Rider	Team	Time
1	Tadej Pogačar (SLO)	UAE Team Emirates	24h 12' 36"
2	Daniel Martínez (COL)	Bora–Hansgrohe	+ 2' 36"
3	Geraint Thomas (GBR)	INEOS Grenadiers	+ 2' 46"
4	Ben O'Connor (AUS)	Decathlon–AG2R La Mondiale	+ 3' 33"
5	Luke Plapp (AUS)	Team Jayco–AlUla	+ 3' 42"
6	Alexey Lutsenko (KAZ)	Astana Qazaqstan Team	+ 3' 49"
7	Cian Uijtdebroeks (BEL)	Visma–Lease a Bike	+ 3' 50"
8	Antonio Tiberi (ITA)	Team Bahrain Victorious	+ 4' 11"
9	Filippo Zana (ITA)	Team Jayco–AlUla	+ 4' 41"
10	Lorenzo Fortunato (ITA)	Astana Qazaqstan Team	+ 4' 44"

== Stage 8 ==
11 May 2024 — Spoleto to Prati di Tivo, 152 km (94 mi)

Stage 8 Result
Rank	Rider	Team	Time
1	Tadej Pogačar (SLO)	UAE Team Emirates	4h 02' 16"
2	Daniel Martínez (COL)	Bora–Hansgrohe	+ 0"
3	Ben O'Connor (AUS)	Decathlon–AG2R La Mondiale	+ 0"
4	Antonio Tiberi (ITA)	Team Bahrain Victorious	+ 2"
5	Geraint Thomas (GBR)	INEOS Grenadiers	+ 2"
6	Einer Rubio (COL)	Movistar Team	+ 2"
7	Cian Uijtdebroeks (BEL)	Visma–Lease a Bike	+ 2"
8	Thymen Arensman (NED)	INEOS Grenadiers	+ 11"
9	Michael Storer (AUS)	Tudor Pro Cycling Team	+ 13"
10	Alex Baudin (FRA)	Decathlon–AG2R La Mondiale	+ 21"

General classification after Stage 8
Rank	Rider	Team	Time
1	Tadej Pogačar (SLO)	UAE Team Emirates	28h 14' 42"
2	Daniel Martínez (COL)	Bora–Hansgrohe	+ 2' 40"
3	Geraint Thomas (GBR)	INEOS Grenadiers	+ 2' 58"
4	Ben O'Connor (AUS)	Decathlon–AG2R La Mondiale	+ 3' 39"
5	Cian Uijtdebroeks (BEL)	Visma–Lease a Bike	+ 4' 02"
6	Antonio Tiberi (ITA)	Team Bahrain Victorious	+ 4' 23"
7	Lorenzo Fortunato (ITA)	Astana Qazaqstan Team	+ 5' 15"
8	Einer Rubio (COL)	Movistar Team	+ 5' 28"
9	Thymen Arensman (NED)	INEOS Grenadiers	+ 5' 30"
10	Jan Hirt (CZE)	Soudal–Quick-Step	+ 5' 53"

== Stage 9 ==
12 May 2024 — Avezzano to Naples, 214 km (133 mi)

Stage 9 Result
Rank	Rider	Team	Time
1	Olav Kooij (NED)	Visma–Lease a Bike	4h 44' 22"
2	Jonathan Milan (ITA)	Lidl–Trek	+ 0"
3	Juan Sebastian Molano (COL)	UAE Team Emirates	+ 0"
4	Alberto Dainese (ITA)	Tudor Pro Cycling Team	+ 0"
5	Danny van Poppel (NED)	Bora–Hansgrohe	+ 0"
6	Madis Mihkels (EST)	Intermarché–Wanty	+ 0"
7	Kaden Groves (AUS)	Alpecin–Deceuninck	+ 0"
8	Andrea Vendrame (ITA)	Decathlon–AG2R La Mondiale	+ 0"
9	Davide Ballerini (ITA)	Astana Qazaqstan Team	+ 0"
10	Max Kanter (GER)	Astana Qazaqstan Team	+ 0"

General classification after Stage 9
Rank	Rider	Team	Time
1	Tadej Pogačar (SLO)	UAE Team Emirates	32h 59' 04"
2	Daniel Martínez (COL)	Bora–Hansgrohe	+ 2' 40"
3	Geraint Thomas (GBR)	INEOS Grenadiers	+ 2' 58"
4	Ben O'Connor (AUS)	Decathlon–AG2R La Mondiale	+ 3' 39"
5	Cian Uijtdebroeks (BEL)	Visma–Lease a Bike	+ 4' 02"
6	Antonio Tiberi (ITA)	Team Bahrain Victorious	+ 4' 23"
7	Lorenzo Fortunato (ITA)	Astana Qazaqstan Team	+ 5' 15"
8	Einer Rubio (COL)	Movistar Team	+ 5' 28"
9	Thymen Arensman (NED)	INEOS Grenadiers	+ 5' 30"
10	Jan Hirt (CZE)	Soudal–Quick-Step	+ 5' 53"

== Rest day 1 ==
13 May 2024 — Naples

== Stage 10 ==
14 May 2024 — Pompei to Cusano Mutri, 142 km (88 mi)

Stage 10 Result
Rank	Rider	Team	Time
1	Valentin Paret-Peintre (FRA)	Decathlon–AG2R La Mondiale	3h 43' 50"
2	Romain Bardet (FRA)	Team dsm–firmenich PostNL	+ 29"
3	Jan Tratnik (SLO)	Visma–Lease a Bike	+ 1' 01"
4	Andrea Bagioli (ITA)	Lidl–Trek	+ 1' 18"
5	Aurélien Paret-Peintre (FRA)	Decathlon–AG2R La Mondiale	+ 1' 25"
6	Simon Geschke (GER)	Cofidis	+ 1' 25"
7	Filippo Zana (ITA)	Team Jayco–AlUla	+ 1' 25"
8	Domenico Pozzovivo (ITA)	VF Group–Bardiani–CSF–Faizanè	+ 1' 25"
9	Nicola Conci (ITA)	Alpecin–Deceuninck	+ 1' 41"
10	Esteban Chaves (COL)	EF Education–EasyPost	+ 1' 56"

General classification after Stage 10
Rank	Rider	Team	Time
1	Tadej Pogačar (SLO)	UAE Team Emirates	36h 46' 08"
2	Daniel Martínez (COL)	Bora–Hansgrohe	+ 2' 40"
3	Geraint Thomas (GBR)	INEOS Grenadiers	+ 2' 58"
4	Ben O'Connor (AUS)	Decathlon–AG2R La Mondiale	+ 3' 39"
5	Cian Uijtdebroeks (BEL)	Visma–Lease a Bike	+ 4' 15"
6	Antonio Tiberi (ITA)	Team Bahrain Victorious	+ 4' 27"
7	Romain Bardet (FRA)	Team dsm–firmenich PostNL	+ 4' 57"
8	Lorenzo Fortunato (ITA)	Astana Qazaqstan Team	+ 5' 19"
9	Filippo Zana (ITA)	Team Jayco–AlUla	+ 5' 23"
10	Einer Rubio (COL)	Movistar Team	+ 5' 28"

== Stage 11 ==
15 May 2024 — Foiano di Val Fortore to Francavilla al Mare, 207 km (129 mi)

Stage 11 Result
Rank	Rider	Team	Time
1	Jonathan Milan (ITA)	Lidl–Trek	4h 23' 18"
2	Kaden Groves (AUS)	Alpecin–Deceuninck	+ 0"
3	Giovanni Lonardi (ITA)	Polti–Kometa	+ 0"
4	Laurence Pithie (NZL)	Groupama–FDJ	+ 0"
5	Juan Sebastian Molano (COL)	UAE Team Emirates	+ 0"
6	Danny Van Poppel (NED)	Bora–Hansgrohe	+ 0"
7	Fernando Gaviria (COL)	Movistar Team	+ 0"
8	Phil Bauhaus (GER)	Team Bahrain Victorious	+ 0"
9	Stanisław Aniołkowski (POL)	Cofidis	+ 0"
10	Enrico Zanoncello (ITA)	VF Group–Bardiani–CSF–Faizanè	+ 0"

General classification after Stage 11
Rank	Rider	Team	Time
1	Tadej Pogačar (SLO)	UAE Team Emirates	41h 09' 26"
2	Daniel Martínez (COL)	Bora–Hansgrohe	+ 2' 40"
3	Geraint Thomas (GBR)	INEOS Grenadiers	+ 2' 56"
4	Ben O'Connor (AUS)	Decathlon–AG2R La Mondiale	+ 3' 39"
5	Antonio Tiberi (ITA)	Team Bahrain Victorious	+ 4' 27"
6	Romain Bardet (FRA)	Team dsm–firmenich PostNL	+ 4' 57"
7	Lorenzo Fortunato (ITA)	Astana Qazaqstan Team	+ 5' 19"
8	Filippo Zana (ITA)	Team Jayco–AlUla	+ 5' 23"
9	Einer Rubio (COL)	Movistar Team	+ 5' 28"
10	Thymen Arensman (NED)	INEOS Grenadiers	+ 5' 52"
