= 2025 Tirreno–Adriatico =

Italian cycling race

2025 UCI World Tour, race 7 of 36

Race details
- Dates: 10–16 March 2025
- Stages: 7
- Distance: 1,147.5 km (713.0 mi)
- Winning time: 28h 41' 24"

Results
Jersey awarded to the overall winner	Winner	Juan Ayuso (ESP)	(UAE Team Emirates XRG)
	Second	Filippo Ganna (ITA)	(INEOS Grenadiers)
	Third	Antonio Tiberi (ITA)	(Team Bahrain Victorious)
Jersey awarded to the points classification winner	Points	Jonathan Milan (ITA)	(Lidl–Trek)
Jersey awarded to the mountains classification winner	Mountains	Manuele Tarozzi (ITA)	(VF Group–Bardiani–CSF–Faizanè)
Jersey awarded to the youth classification winner	Youth	Juan Ayuso (ESP)	(UAE Team Emirates XRG)
	Team	(United Arab Emirates) UAE Team Emirates XRG	

The 2025 Tirreno–Adriatico was a road cycling stage race that took place between 10 and 16 March in Italy. It was the 60th edition of the Tirreno–Adriatico and the seventh race of the 2025 UCI World Tour.

== Teams ==
All 18 UCI WorldTeams and six UCI ProTeams made up the 24 teams that participated in the race.

UCI WorldTeams

- Alpecin–Deceuninck
- Arkéa–B&B Hotels
- Cofidis
- Decathlon–AG2R La Mondiale
- EF Education–EasyPost
- Groupama–FDJ
- INEOS Grenadiers
- Intermarché–Wanty
- Lidl–Trek
- Movistar Team
- Red Bull–Bora–Hansgrohe
- Soudal–Quick-Step
- Team Bahrain Victorious
- Team Jayco–AlUla
- Team Picnic–PostNL
- UAE Team Emirates XRG
- Visma–Lease a Bike
- XDS Astana Team

UCI ProTeams

- Israel–Premier Tech
- Q36.5 Pro Cycling Team
- Team Polti VisitMalta
- Tudor Pro Cycling Team
- Uno-X Mobility
- VF Group–Bardiani–CSF–Faizanè

== Route ==
Stage characteristics and winners
Stage	Date	Course	Distance	Type	Stage winner
1	10 March	Lido di Camaiore to Lido di Camaiore	11.5 km (7.1 mi)	Individual time trial	Filippo Ganna (ITA)
2	11 March	Camaiore to Follonica	192 km (119 mi)	Hilly stage	Jonathan Milan (ITA)
3	12 March	Follonica to Colfiorito	239 km (149 mi)	Intermediate stage	Andrea Vendrame (ITA)
4	13 March	Norcia to Trasacco	190 km (120 mi)	Intermediate stage	Olav Kooij (NED)
5	14 March	Ascoli Piceno to Pergola	205 km (127 mi)	Mountain stage	Fredrik Dversnes (NOR)
6	15 March	Cartoceto to Frontignano	163 km (101 mi)	Mountain stage	Juan Ayuso (ESP)
7	16 March	Porto Potenza Picena to San Benedetto del Tronto	147 km (91 mi)	Flat stage	Jonathan Milan (ITA)
Total			1,147.5 km (713.0 mi)		

== Stages ==
=== Stage 1 ===
10 March 2025 — Lido di Camaiore to Lido di Camaiore, 11.5 km (7.1 mi) (ITT)

Stage 1 Result (1–10)
Rank	Rider	Team	Time
1	Filippo Ganna (ITA)	INEOS Grenadiers	12' 17"
2	Juan Ayuso (ESP)	UAE Team Emirates XRG	+ 23"
3	Johan Price-Pejtersen (DEN)	Alpecin–Deceuninck	+ 28"
4	Antonio Tiberi (ITA)	Team Bahrain Victorious	+ 29"
5	Jonathan Milan (ITA)	Lidl–Trek	+ 31"
6	Derek Gee (CAN)	Israel–Premier Tech	+ 34"
7	Mattia Cattaneo (ITA)	Soudal–Quick-Step	+ 36"
8	Søren Wærenskjold (NOR)	Uno-X Mobility	+ 37"
9	Isaac del Toro (MEX)	UAE Team Emirates XRG	+ 38"
10	Kévin Vauquelin (FRA)	Arkéa–B&B Hotels	+ 41"

General classification after Stage 1 (1–10)
Rank	Rider	Team	Time
1	Filippo Ganna (ITA)	INEOS Grenadiers	12' 17"
2	Juan Ayuso (ESP)	UAE Team Emirates XRG	+ 23"
3	Johan Price-Pejtersen (DEN)	Alpecin–Deceuninck	+ 28"
4	Antonio Tiberi (ITA)	Team Bahrain Victorious	+ 29"
5	Jonathan Milan (ITA)	Lidl–Trek	+ 31"
6	Derek Gee (CAN)	Israel–Premier Tech	+ 34"
7	Mattia Cattaneo (ITA)	Soudal–Quick-Step	+ 36"
8	Søren Wærenskjold (NOR)	Uno-X Mobility	+ 37"
9	Isaac del Toro (MEX)	UAE Team Emirates XRG	+ 38"
10	Kévin Vauquelin (FRA)	Arkéa–B&B Hotels	+ 41"

=== Stage 2 ===
11 March 2025 – Camaiore to Follonica, 192 km (119 mi)

Stage 2 Result (1–10)
Rank	Rider	Team	Time
1	Jonathan Milan (ITA)	Lidl–Trek	4h 45' 13"
2	Maikel Zijlaard (NED)	Tudor Pro Cycling Team	+ 0"
3	Paul Penhoët (FRA)	Groupama–FDJ	+ 0"
4	Olav Kooij (NED)	Visma–Lease a Bike	+ 0"
5	Simone Consonni (ITA)	Lidl–Trek	+ 0"
6	Sam Bennett (IRL)	Decathlon–AG2R La Mondiale	+ 0"
7	Jake Stewart (GBR)	Israel–Premier Tech	+ 0"
8	Tim van Dijke (NED)	Red Bull–Bora–Hansgrohe	+ 0"
9	Bryan Coquard (FRA)	Cofidis	+ 0"
10	Enrico Zanoncello (ITA)	VF Group–Bardiani–CSF–Faizanè	+ 0"

General classification after Stage 2 (1–10)
Rank	Rider	Team	Time
1	Filippo Ganna (ITA)	INEOS Grenadiers	4h 57' 30"
2	Jonathan Milan (ITA)	Lidl–Trek	+ 19"
3	Juan Ayuso (ESP)	UAE Team Emirates XRG	+ 22"
4	Johan Price-Pejtersen (DEN)	Alpecin–Deceuninck	+ 28"
5	Antonio Tiberi (ITA)	Team Bahrain Victorious	+ 29"
6	Derek Gee (CAN)	Israel–Premier Tech	+ 34"
7	Mattia Cattaneo (ITA)	Soudal–Quick-Step	+ 36"
8	Søren Wærenskjold (NOR)	Uno-X Mobility	+ 37"
9	Isaac del Toro (MEX)	UAE Team Emirates XRG	+ 38"
10	Maikel Zijlaard (NED)	Tudor Pro Cycling Team	+ 40"

=== Stage 3 ===
12 March 2025 – Follonica to Colfiorito, 239 km (149 mi)

Stage 3 Result (1–10)
Rank	Rider	Team	Time
1	Andrea Vendrame (ITA)	Decathlon–AG2R La Mondiale	6h 28' 25"
2	Tom Pidcock (GBR)	Q36.5 Pro Cycling Team	+ 0"
3	Romain Grégoire (FRA)	Groupama–FDJ	+ 0"
4	Rick Pluimers (NED)	Tudor Pro Cycling Team	+ 0"
5	Roger Adrià (ESP)	Red Bull–Bora–Hansgrohe	+ 0"
6	Simone Velasco (ITA)	XDS Astana Team	+ 0"
7	Filippo Fiorelli (ITA)	VF Group–Bardiani–CSF–Faizanè	+ 0"
8	Alex Aranburu (ESP)	Cofidis	+ 0"
9	Samuele Battistella (ITA)	EF Education–EasyPost	+ 0"
10	Filippo Ganna (ITA)	INEOS Grenadiers	+ 0"

General classification after Stage 3 (1–10)
Rank	Rider	Team	Time
1	Filippo Ganna (ITA)	INEOS Grenadiers	11h 25' 55"
2	Juan Ayuso (ESP)	UAE Team Emirates XRG	+ 22"
3	Antonio Tiberi (ITA)	Team Bahrain Victorious	+ 29"
4	Derek Gee (CAN)	Israel–Premier Tech	+ 34"
5	Mattia Cattaneo (ITA)	Soudal–Quick-Step	+ 36"
6	Kévin Vauquelin (FRA)	Arkéa–B&B Hotels	+ 41"
7	Eddie Dunbar (IRL)	Team Jayco–AlUla	+ 44"
8	Laurens De Plus (BEL)	INEOS Grenadiers	+ 45"
9	Ben Healy (IRL)	EF Education–EasyPost	+ 48"
10	Romain Grégoire (FRA)	Groupama–FDJ	+ 48"

=== Stage 4 ===
13 March 2025 – Norcia to Trasacco, 190 km (120 mi)

Stage 4 Result (1–10)
Rank	Rider	Team	Time
1	Olav Kooij (NED)	Visma–Lease a Bike	4h 48' 05"
2	Rick Pluimers (NED)	Tudor Pro Cycling Team	+ 0"
3	Mathieu van der Poel (NED)	Alpecin–Deceuninck	+ 0"
4	Paul Magnier (FRA)	Soudal–Quick-Step	+ 0"
5	Mirco Maestri (ITA)	Team Polti VisitMalta	+ 0"
6	Andrea Vendrame (ITA)	Decathlon–AG2R La Mondiale	+ 0"
7	Filippo Ganna (ITA)	INEOS Grenadiers	+ 0"
8	Tom Pidcock (GBR)	Q36.5 Pro Cycling Team	+ 0"
9	Giovanni Lonardi (ITA)	Team Polti VisitMalta	+ 0"
10	Filippo Fiorelli (ITA)	VF Group–Bardiani–CSF–Faizanè	+ 0"

General classification after Stage 4 (1–10)
Rank	Rider	Team	Time
1	Filippo Ganna (ITA)	INEOS Grenadiers	16h 14' 00"
2	Juan Ayuso (ESP)	UAE Team Emirates XRG	+ 22"
3	Antonio Tiberi (ITA)	Team Bahrain Victorious	+ 29"
4	Derek Gee (CAN)	Israel–Premier Tech	+ 34"
5	Mattia Cattaneo (ITA)	Soudal–Quick-Step	+ 36"
6	Kévin Vauquelin (FRA)	Arkéa–B&B Hotels	+ 41"
7	Eddie Dunbar (IRL)	Team Jayco–AlUla	+ 44"
8	Laurens De Plus (BEL)	INEOS Grenadiers	+ 45"
9	Ben Healy (IRL)	EF Education–EasyPost	+ 48"
10	Romain Grégoire (FRA)	Groupama–FDJ	+ 48"

=== Stage 5 ===
14 March 2025 – Ascoli Piceno to Pergola, 205 km (127 mi)

Stage 5 Result (1–10)
Rank	Rider	Team	Time
1	Fredrik Dversnes (NOR)	Uno-X Mobility	5h 04' 56"
2	Mathieu van der Poel (NED)	Alpecin–Deceuninck	+ 7"
3	Roger Adrià (ESP)	Red Bull–Bora–Hansgrohe	+ 7"
4	Giulio Ciccone (ITA)	Lidl–Trek	+ 7"
5	Alex Aranburu (ESP)	Cofidis	+ 7"
6	Tom Pidcock (GBR)	Q36.5 Pro Cycling Team	+ 7"
7	Romain Grégoire (FRA)	Groupama–FDJ	+ 7"
8	Tobias Halland Johannessen (NOR)	Uno-X Mobility	+ 7"
9	Pello Bilbao (ESP)	Team Bahrain Victorious	+ 7"
10	Simone Velasco (ITA)	XDS Astana Team	+ 7"

General classification after Stage 5 (1–10)
Rank	Rider	Team	Time
1	Filippo Ganna (ITA)	INEOS Grenadiers	21h 19' 03"
2	Juan Ayuso (ESP)	UAE Team Emirates XRG	+ 22"
3	Antonio Tiberi (ITA)	Team Bahrain Victorious	+ 29"
4	Derek Gee (CAN)	Israel–Premier Tech	+ 34"
5	Mattia Cattaneo (ITA)	Soudal–Quick-Step	+ 36"
6	Kévin Vauquelin (FRA)	Arkéa–B&B Hotels	+ 41"
7	Laurens De Plus (BEL)	INEOS Grenadiers	+ 45"
8	Romain Grégoire (FRA)	Groupama–FDJ	+ 48"
9	David de la Cruz (ESP)	Q36.5 Pro Cycling Team	+ 54"
10	Pello Bilbao (ESP)	Team Bahrain Victorious	+ 54"

=== Stage 6 ===
15 March 2025 – Cartoceto to Frontignano, 163 km (101 mi)

Stage 6 Result (1–10)
Rank	Rider	Team	Time
1	Juan Ayuso (ESP)	UAE Team Emirates XRG	4h 14' 02"
2	Tom Pidcock (GBR)	Q36.5 Pro Cycling Team	+ 13"
3	Jai Hindley (AUS)	Red Bull–Bora–Hansgrohe	+ 13"
4	Mikel Landa (ESP)	Soudal–Quick-Step	+ 15"
5	Antonio Tiberi (ITA)	Team Bahrain Victorious	+ 20"
6	Derek Gee (CAN)	Israel–Premier Tech	+ 20"
7	Isaac del Toro (MEX)	UAE Team Emirates XRG	+ 36"
8	Ben Healy (IRL)	EF Education–EasyPost	+ 42"
9	Tobias Halland Johannessen (NOR)	Uno-X Mobility	+ 45"
10	Lorenzo Fortunato (ITA)	XDS Astana Team	+ 50"

General classification after Stage 6 (1–10)
Rank	Rider	Team	Time
1	Juan Ayuso (ESP)	UAE Team Emirates XRG	25h 33' 17"
2	Antonio Tiberi (ITA)	Team Bahrain Victorious	+ 37"
3	Filippo Ganna (ITA)	INEOS Grenadiers	+ 38"
4	Derek Gee (CAN)	Israel–Premier Tech	+ 42"
5	Jai Hindley (AUS)	Red Bull–Bora–Hansgrohe	+ 53"
6	Tom Pidcock (GBR)	Q36.5 Pro Cycling Team	+ 56"
7	Mikel Landa (ESP)	Soudal–Quick-Step	+ 1' 05"
8	David de la Cruz (ESP)	Q36.5 Pro Cycling Team	+ 1' 32"
9	Pello Bilbao (ESP)	Team Bahrain Victorious	+ 1' 32"
10	Mattia Cattaneo (ITA)	Soudal–Quick-Step	+ 1' 38"

=== Stage 7 ===
16 March 2025 – Porto Potenza Picena to San Benedetto del Tronto, 147 km (91 mi)

Stage 7 Result (1–10)
Rank	Rider	Team	Time
1	Jonathan Milan (ITA)	Lidl–Trek	3h 08' 07"
2	Sam Bennett (IRL)	Decathlon–AG2R La Mondiale	+ 0"
3	Olav Kooij (NED)	Visma–Lease a Bike	+ 0"
4	Jake Stewart (GBR)	Israel–Premier Tech	+ 0"
5	Paul Penhoët (FRA)	Groupama–FDJ	+ 0"
6	Giovanni Lonardi (ITA)	Team Polti VisitMalta	+ 0"
7	Maikel Zijlaard (NED)	Tudor Pro Cycling Team	+ 0"
8	Natnael Tesfatsion (ERI)	Movistar Team	+ 0"
9	Casper van Uden (NED)	Team Picnic–PostNL	+ 0"
10	Clément Venturini (FRA)	Arkéa–B&B Hotels	+ 0"

General classification after Stage 7 (1–10)
Rank	Rider	Team	Time
1	Juan Ayuso (ESP)	UAE Team Emirates XRG	28h 41' 24"
2	Filippo Ganna (ITA)	INEOS Grenadiers	+ 35"
3	Antonio Tiberi (ITA)	Team Bahrain Victorious	+ 36"
4	Derek Gee (CAN)	Israel–Premier Tech	+ 42"
5	Jai Hindley (AUS)	Red Bull–Bora–Hansgrohe	+ 53"
6	Tom Pidcock (GBR)	Q36.5 Pro Cycling Team	+ 56"
7	Mikel Landa (ESP)	Soudal–Quick-Step	+ 1' 05"
8	David de la Cruz (ESP)	Q36.5 Pro Cycling Team	+ 1' 32"
9	Pello Bilbao (ESP)	Team Bahrain Victorious	+ 1' 32"
10	Mattia Cattaneo (ITA)	Soudal–Quick-Step	+ 1' 38"

== Classification leadership table ==
Classification leadership by stage
Stage	Winner	General classification	Points classification	Mountains classification	Young rider classification	Team classification
1	Filippo Ganna	Filippo Ganna	Filippo Ganna	not awarded	Juan Ayuso	INEOS Grenadiers
2	Jonathan Milan	Filippo Ganna	Jonathan Milan	Davide Bais	Jonathan Milan	INEOS Grenadiers
3	Andrea Vendrame	Filippo Ganna	Jonathan Milan	Manuele Tarozzi	Juan Ayuso	UAE Team Emirates XRG
4	Olav Kooij	Filippo Ganna	Jonathan Milan	Manuele Tarozzi	Juan Ayuso	UAE Team Emirates XRG
5	Fredrik Dversnes	Filippo Ganna	Jonathan Milan	Manuele Tarozzi	Juan Ayuso	UAE Team Emirates XRG
6	Juan Ayuso	Juan Ayuso	Tom Pidcock	Manuele Tarozzi	Juan Ayuso	UAE Team Emirates XRG
7	Jonathan Milan	Juan Ayuso	Jonathan Milan	Manuele Tarozzi	Juan Ayuso	UAE Team Emirates XRG
Final		Juan Ayuso	Jonathan Milan	Manuele Tarozzi	Juan Ayuso	UAE Team Emirates XRG

== Classification standings ==
Legend
Denotes the winner of the general classification	Denotes the winner of the mountains classification
Denotes the winner of the points classification	Denotes the winner of the young rider classification

=== General classification ===
Final general classification (1-10)
Rank	Rider	Team	Time
1	Juan Ayuso (ESP)	UAE Team Emirates XRG	28h 41' 24"
2	Filippo Ganna (ITA)	INEOS Grenadiers	+ 35"
3	Antonio Tiberi (ITA)	Team Bahrain Victorious	+ 36"
4	Derek Gee (CAN)	Israel–Premier Tech	+ 42"
5	Jai Hindley (AUS)	Red Bull–Bora–Hansgrohe	+ 53"
6	Tom Pidcock (GBR)	Q36.5 Pro Cycling Team	+ 56"
7	Mikel Landa (ESP)	Soudal–Quick-Step	+ 1' 05"
8	David de la Cruz (ESP)	Q36.5 Pro Cycling Team	+ 1' 32"
9	Pello Bilbao (ESP)	Team Bahrain Victorious	+ 1' 32"
10	Mattia Cattaneo (ITA)	Soudal–Quick-Step	+ 1' 38"

=== Points classification ===
Final points classification (1-10)
Rank	Rider	Team	Points
1	Jonathan Milan (ITA)	Lidl–Trek	41
2	Tom Pidcock (GBR)	Q36.5 Pro Cycling Team	28
3	Olav Kooij (NED)	Visma–Lease a Bike	27
4	Juan Ayuso (ESP)	UAE Team Emirates XRG	24
5	Filippo Ganna (ITA)	INEOS Grenadiers	22
6	Andrea Vendrame (ITA)	Decathlon–AG2R La Mondiale	22
7	Mathieu van der Poel (NED)	Alpecin–Deceuninck	18
8	Rick Pluimers (NED)	Tudor Pro Cycling Team	17
9	Antonio Tiberi (ITA)	Team Bahrain Victorious	15
10	Roger Adrià (ESP)	Red Bull–Bora–Hansgrohe	15

=== Mountains classification ===
Final mountains classification (1-10)
Rank	Rider	Team	Points
1	Manuele Tarozzi (ITA)	VF Group–Bardiani–CSF–Faizanè	32
2	Juan Ayuso (ESP)	UAE Team Emirates XRG	20
3	Tom Pidcock (GBR)	Q36.5 Pro Cycling Team	13
4	Davide Bais (ITA)	Team Polti VisitMalta	11
5	Richard Carapaz (ECU)	EF Education–EasyPost	10
6	Fredrik Dversnes (NOR)	Uno-X Mobility	8
7	Derek Gee (CAN)	Israel–Premier Tech	7
8	Jai Hindley (AUS)	Red Bull–Bora–Hansgrohe	7
9	Ben Healy (IRL)	EF Education–EasyPost	7
10	Brandon Rivera (COL)	INEOS Grenadiers	5

=== Young rider classification ===
Final young rider classification (1-10)
Rank	Rider	Team	Time
1	Juan Ayuso (ESP)	UAE Team Emirates XRG	28h 41' 24"
2	Antonio Tiberi (ITA)	Team Bahrain Victorious	+ 36"
3	Kévin Vauquelin (FRA)	Arkéa–B&B Hotels	+ 1' 52"
4	Romain Grégoire (FRA)	Groupama–FDJ	+ 2' 05"
5	Davide Piganzoli (ITA)	Team Polti VisitMalta	+ 2' 11"
6	Isaac del Toro (MEX)	UAE Team Emirates XRG	+ 2' 33"
7	Alessandro Pinarello (ITA)	VF Group–Bardiani–CSF–Faizanè	+ 2' 41"
8	Ben Healy (IRL)	EF Education–EasyPost	+ 2' 54"
9	Florian Samuel Kajamini (ITA)	XDS Astana Team	+ 3' 26"
10	Johannes Staune-Mittet (NOR)	Decathlon–AG2R La Mondiale	+ 5' 25"

=== Team classification ===
Final teams classification (1-10)
Rank	Team	Time
1	(United Arab Emirates) UAE Team Emirates XRG	86h 07' 15"
2	(Belgium) Soudal–Quick-Step	+ 4' 23"
3	(Kazakhstan) XDS Astana Team	+ 5' 21"
4	(United States) EF Education–EasyPost	+ 6' 20"
5	Team Bahrain Victorious	+ 6' 23"
6	(Netherlands) Visma–Lease a Bike	+ 7' 03"
7	(France) Groupama–FDJ	+ 9' 34"
8	(Italy) VF Group–Bardiani–CSF–Faizanè	+ 9' 51"
9	(France) Decathlon–AG2R La Mondiale	+ 10' 18"
10	(United Kingdom) INEOS Grenadiers	+ 11' 38"
