= 2024 Volta a Catalunya =

Spanish cycling race

2024 UCI World Tour, race 9 of 35
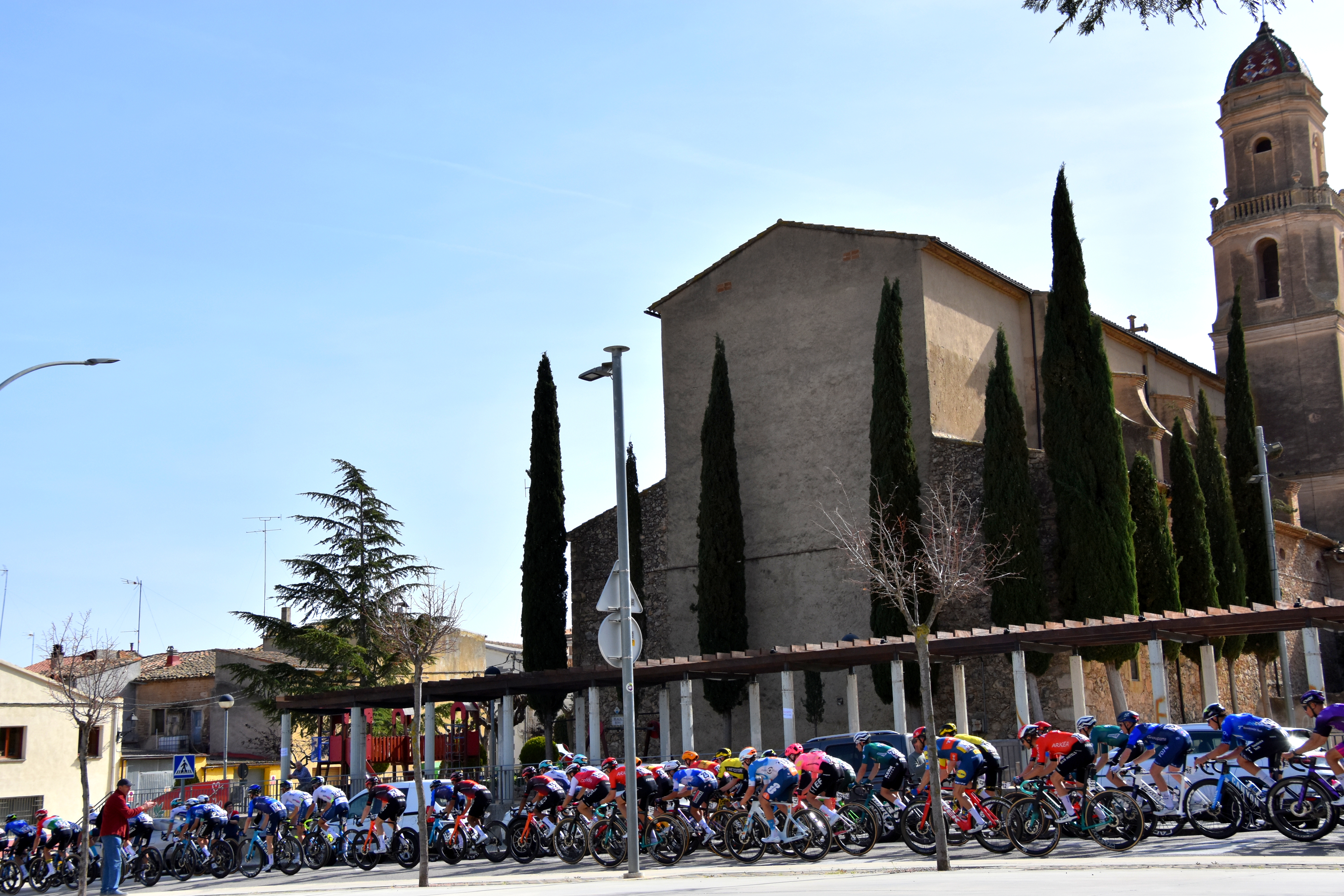
- Peloton in stage 5

Race details
- Dates: 18–24 March 2024
- Stages: 7
- Distance: 1,173.5 km (729.2 mi)

Results
Jersey awarded to the overall winner	Winner	Tadej Pogačar (SLO)	(UAE Team Emirates)
	Second	Mikel Landa (ESP)	(Soudal–Quick-Step)
	Third	Egan Bernal (COL)	(Ineos Grenadiers)
Jersey awarded to the points classification winner	Points	Tadej Pogačar (SLO)	(UAE Team Emirates)
Jersey awarded to the mountains classification winner	Mountains	Tadej Pogačar (SLO)	(UAE Team Emirates)
Jersey awarded to the youth classification winner	Youth	Lenny Martinez (FRA)	(Groupama–FDJ)
Jersey awarded to the team classification winner	Team	Team Bahrain Victorious	

The 2024 Volta a Catalunya was a road cycling stage race that took place between 18 and 24 March. It was the 103rd edition of the Volta a Catalunya. The race was won by Tadej Pogačar, who also won the points classification, the mountains classification and four out of seven stages.

== Teams ==
All 18 UCI WorldTeams and seven UCI ProTeams participated in the race.

UCI WorldTeams

- Alpecin–Deceuninck
- Arkéa–B&B Hotels
- Astana Qazaqstan Team
- Bora–Hansgrohe
- Cofidis
- Decathlon–AG2R La Mondiale
- EF Education–EasyPost
- Groupama–FDJ
- Ineos Grenadiers
- Intermarché–Wanty
- Lidl–Trek
- Movistar Team
- Soudal–Quick-Step
- Team Bahrain Victorious
- Team dsm–firmenich PostNL
- Team Jayco–AlUla
- UAE Team Emirates
- Visma–Lease a Bike

UCI ProTeams

- Burgos BH
- Caja Rural–Seguros RGA
- Equipo Kern Pharma
- Euskaltel–Euskadi
- Israel–Premier Tech
- Lotto–Dstny
- Uno-X Mobility

== Route ==
Stage characteristics and winners
Stage	Date	Course	Distance	Elevation gain	Type	Winner
1	18 March	Sant Feliu de Guíxols to Sant Feliu de Guíxols	174 km (108 mi)	2,272 m (7,454 ft)	Medium-mountain stage	Nick Schultz (AUS)
2	19 March	Mataró to Vallter	186.5 km (115.9 mi)	2,587 m (8,488 ft)	Mountain stage	Tadej Pogačar (SLO)
3	20 March	Sant Joan de les Abadesses to Port Ainé	176.5 km (109.7 mi)	3,925 m (12,877 ft)	Mountain stage	Tadej Pogačar (SLO)
4	21 March	Sort to Lleida	169 km (105 mi)	1,201 m (3,940 ft)	Flat stage	Marijn van den Berg (NED)
5	22 March	Altafulla to Viladecans	167.5 km (104.1 mi)	2,306 m (7,566 ft)	Flat stage	Axel Laurance (FRA)
6	23 March	Berga to Queralt	154.5 km (96.0 mi)	4,085 m (13,402 ft)	Mountain stage	Tadej Pogačar (SLO)
7	24 March	Barcelona to Barcelona	145.5 km (90.4 mi)	1,943 m (6,375 ft)	Medium-mountain stage	Tadej Pogačar (SLO)
Total			1,173.5 km (729.2 mi)	18,319 m (60,102 ft)		

== Stages ==
=== Stage 1 ===
18 March 2024 — Sant Feliu de Guíxols to Sant Feliu de Guíxols, 174 km (108 mi)

Stage 1 Result (1–10)
Rank	Rider	Team	Time
1	Nick Schultz (AUS)	Israel–Premier Tech	4h 11' 38"
2	Tadej Pogačar (SLO)	UAE Team Emirates	+ 0"
3	Stephen Williams (GBR)	Israel–Premier Tech	+ 0"
4	Dorian Godon (FRA)	Decathlon–AG2R La Mondiale	+ 0"
5	Axel Laurance (FRA)	Alpecin–Deceuninck	+ 0"
6	Rémy Rochas (FRA)	Groupama–FDJ	+ 0"
7	Ilan Van Wilder (BEL)	Soudal–Quick-Step	+ 0"
8	Aleksandr Vlasov	Bora–Hansgrohe	+ 0"
9	Sepp Kuss (USA)	Visma–Lease a Bike	+ 0"
10	Harold Tejada (COL)	Astana Qazaqstan Team	+ 0"

General classification after Stage 1 (1–10)
Rank	Rider	Team	Time
1	Nick Schultz (AUS)	Israel–Premier Tech	4h 11' 28"
2	Tadej Pogačar (SLO)	UAE Team Emirates	+ 2"
3	Stephen Williams (GBR)	Israel–Premier Tech	+ 6"
4	Egan Bernal (COL)	Ineos Grenadiers	+ 7"
5	Laurens De Plus (BEL)	Ineos Grenadiers	+ 9"
6	Dorian Godon (FRA)	Decathlon–AG2R La Mondiale	+ 10"
7	Axel Laurance (FRA)	Alpecin–Deceuninck	+ 10"
8	Rémy Rochas (FRA)	Groupama–FDJ	+ 10"
9	Ilan Van Wilder (BEL)	Soudal–Quick-Step	+ 10"
10	Aleksandr Vlasov	Bora–Hansgrohe	+ 10"

=== Stage 2 ===
19 March 2024 — Mataró to Vallter, 186.5 km (115.9 mi)

Stage 2 Result (1–10)
Rank	Rider	Team	Time
1	Tadej Pogačar (SLO)	UAE Team Emirates	4h 52' 37"
2	Mikel Landa (ESP)	Soudal–Quick-Step	+ 1' 23"
3	Aleksandr Vlasov	Bora–Hansgrohe	+ 1' 24"
4	João Almeida (POR)	UAE Team Emirates	+ 1' 38"
5	Lenny Martinez (FRA)	Groupama–FDJ	+ 1' 43"
6	Chris Harper (AUS)	Team Jayco–AlUla	+ 1' 44"
7	Egan Bernal (COL)	Ineos Grenadiers	+ 1' 47"
8	Enric Mas (ESP)	Movistar Team	+ 1' 49"
9	Wout Poels (NED)	Team Bahrain Victorious	+ 2' 03"
10	José Manuel Díaz (ESP)	Burgos BH	+ 2' 03"

General classification after Stage 2 (1–10)
Rank	Rider	Team	Time
1	Tadej Pogačar (SLO)	UAE Team Emirates	9h 03' 57"
2	Mikel Landa (ESP)	Soudal–Quick-Step	+ 1' 35"
3	Aleksandr Vlasov	Bora–Hansgrohe	+ 1' 38"
4	João Almeida (POR)	UAE Team Emirates	+ 1' 56"
5	Lenny Martinez (FRA)	Groupama–FDJ	+ 2' 01"
6	Chris Harper (AUS)	Team Jayco–AlUla	+ 2' 02"
7	Egan Bernal (COL)	Ineos Grenadiers	+ 2' 02"
8	Enric Mas (ESP)	Movistar Team	+ 2' 07"
9	Sepp Kuss (USA)	Visma–Lease a Bike	+ 2' 21"
10	José Manuel Díaz (ESP)	Burgos BH	+ 2' 21"

=== Stage 3 ===
20 March 2024 — Sant Joan de les Abadesses to Port Ainé, 176.5 km (109.7 mi)

Stage 3 Result (1–10)
Rank	Rider	Team	Time
1	Tadej Pogačar (SLO)	UAE Team Emirates	4h 34' 25"
2	Mikel Landa (ESP)	Soudal–Quick-Step	+ 48"
3	Antonio Tiberi (ITA)	Team Bahrain Victorious	+ 1' 03"
4	Wout Poels (NED)	Team Bahrain Victorious	+ 1' 03"
5	Sepp Kuss (USA)	Visma–Lease a Bike	+ 1' 03"
6	Aleksandr Vlasov	Bora–Hansgrohe	+ 1' 10"
7	Cristián Rodríguez (ESP)	Arkéa–B&B Hotels	+ 1' 10"
8	Chris Harper (AUS)	Team Jayco–AlUla	+ 1' 10"
9	Lenny Martinez (FRA)	Groupama–FDJ	+ 1' 10"
10	Enric Mas (ESP)	Movistar Team	+ 1' 10"

General classification after Stage 3 (1–10)
Rank	Rider	Team	Time
1	Tadej Pogačar (SLO)	UAE Team Emirates	13h 38' 12"
2	Mikel Landa (ESP)	Soudal–Quick-Step	+ 2' 27"
3	Aleksandr Vlasov	Bora–Hansgrohe	+ 2' 55"
4	Lenny Martinez (FRA)	Groupama–FDJ	+ 3' 21"
5	Chris Harper (AUS)	Team Jayco–AlUla	+ 3' 22"
6	Enric Mas (ESP)	Movistar Team	+ 3' 27"
7	Sepp Kuss (USA)	Visma–Lease a Bike	+ 3' 34"
8	Wout Poels (NED)	Team Bahrain Victorious	+ 3' 34"
9	Egan Bernal (COL)	Ineos Grenadiers	+ 3' 50"
10	João Almeida (POR)	UAE Team Emirates	+ 3' 52"

=== Stage 4 ===
21 March 2024 — Sort to Lleida, 169 km (105 mi)

Stage 4 Result (1–10)
Rank	Rider	Team	Time
1	Marijn van den Berg (NED)	EF Education–EasyPost	3h 40' 19"
2	Arne Marit (BEL)	Intermarché–Wanty	+ 0"
3	Emīls Liepiņš (LAT)	Team dsm–firmenich PostNL	+ 0"
4	Bryan Coquard (FRA)	Cofidis	+ 0"
5	Axel Laurance (FRA)	Alpecin–Deceuninck	+ 0"
6	Cyril Barthe (FRA)	Groupama–FDJ	+ 0"
7	Ethan Hayter (GBR)	Ineos Grenadiers	+ 0"
8	Dorian Godon (FRA)	Decathlon–AG2R La Mondiale	+ 0"
9	Orluis Aular (VEN)	Caja Rural–Seguros RGA	+ 0"
10	Jacopo Mosca (ITA)	Lidl–Trek	+ 0"

General classification after Stage 4 (1–10)
Rank	Rider	Team	Time
1	Tadej Pogačar (SLO)	UAE Team Emirates	17h 18' 31"
2	Mikel Landa (ESP)	Soudal–Quick-Step	+ 2' 27"
3	Aleksandr Vlasov	Bora–Hansgrohe	+ 2' 55"
4	Lenny Martinez (FRA)	Groupama–FDJ	+ 3' 21"
5	Chris Harper (AUS)	Team Jayco–AlUla	+ 3' 22"
6	Enric Mas (ESP)	Movistar Team	+ 3' 27"
7	Wout Poels (NED)	Team Bahrain Victorious	+ 3' 31"
8	Sepp Kuss (USA)	Visma–Lease a Bike	+ 3' 32"
9	Egan Bernal (COL)	Ineos Grenadiers	+ 3' 50"
10	João Almeida (POR)	UAE Team Emirates	+ 3' 52"

=== Stage 5 ===
22 March 2024 — Altafulla to Viladecans, 167.5 km (104.1 mi)

Stage 5 Result (1–10)
Rank	Rider	Team	Time
1	Axel Laurance (FRA)	Alpecin–Deceuninck	3h 36' 05"
2	Marijn van den Berg (NED)	EF Education–EasyPost	+ 0"
3	Bryan Coquard (FRA)	Cofidis	+ 0"
4	Orluis Aular (VEN)	Caja Rural–Seguros RGA	+ 0"
5	Stephen Williams (GBR)	Israel–Premier Tech	+ 0"
6	Patrick Konrad (AUT)	Lidl–Trek	+ 0"
7	Dorian Godon (FRA)	Decathlon–AG2R La Mondiale	+ 0"
8	Pau Miquel (ESP)	Equipo Kern Pharma	+ 0"
9	Fernando Barceló (ESP)	Caja Rural–Seguros RGA	+ 0"
10	Frank van den Broek (NED)	Team dsm–firmenich PostNL	+ 0"

General classification after Stage 5 (1–10)
Rank	Rider	Team	Time
1	Tadej Pogačar (SLO)	UAE Team Emirates	20h 54' 36"
2	Mikel Landa (ESP)	Soudal–Quick-Step	+ 2' 27"
3	Aleksandr Vlasov	Bora–Hansgrohe	+ 2' 55"
4	Lenny Martinez (FRA)	Groupama–FDJ	+ 3' 21"
5	Chris Harper (AUS)	Team Jayco–AlUla	+ 3' 22"
6	Enric Mas (ESP)	Movistar Team	+ 3' 24"
7	Sepp Kuss (USA)	Visma–Lease a Bike	+ 3' 31"
8	Wout Poels (NED)	Team Bahrain Victorious	+ 3' 31"
9	Egan Bernal (COL)	Ineos Grenadiers	+ 3' 50"
10	João Almeida (POR)	UAE Team Emirates	+ 3' 52"

=== Stage 6 ===
23 March 2024 — Berga to Queralt, 154.5 km (96.0 mi)

Stage 6 Result (1–10)
Rank	Rider	Team	Time
1	Tadej Pogačar (SLO)	UAE Team Emirates	4h 11' 53"
2	Egan Bernal (COL)	Ineos Grenadiers	+ 57"
3	Mikel Landa (ESP)	Soudal–Quick-Step	+ 57"
4	Enric Mas (ESP)	Movistar Team	+ 2' 14"
5	Chris Harper (AUS)	Team Jayco–AlUla	+ 2' 16"
6	Antonio Tiberi (ITA)	Team Bahrain Victorious	+ 2' 16"
7	João Almeida (POR)	UAE Team Emirates	+ 2' 18"
8	Lenny Martinez (FRA)	Groupama–FDJ	+ 2' 18"
9	Lorenzo Fortunato (ITA)	Astana Qazaqstan Team	+ 2' 34"
10	Aleksandr Vlasov	Bora–Hansgrohe	+ 2' 38"

General classification after Stage 6 (1–10)
Rank	Rider	Team	Time
1	Tadej Pogačar (SLO)	UAE Team Emirates	25h 06' 16"
2	Mikel Landa (ESP)	Soudal–Quick-Step	+ 3' 31"
3	Egan Bernal (COL)	Ineos Grenadiers	+ 4' 53"
4	Aleksandr Vlasov	Bora–Hansgrohe	+ 5' 46"
5	Enric Mas (ESP)	Movistar Team	+ 5' 51"
6	Chris Harper (AUS)	Team Jayco–AlUla	+ 5' 51"
7	Lenny Martinez (FRA)	Groupama–FDJ	+ 5' 52"
8	Antonio Tiberi (ITA)	Team Bahrain Victorious	+ 6' 23"
9	João Almeida (POR)	UAE Team Emirates	+ 6' 23"
10	Lorenzo Fortunato (ITA)	Astana Qazaqstan Team	+ 7' 17"

=== Stage 7 ===
24 March 2024 — Barcelona to Barcelona, 145.5 km (90.4 mi)

Stage 7 Result (1–10)
Rank	Rider	Team	Time
1	Tadej Pogačar (SLO)	UAE Team Emirates	3h 15' 23"
2	Dorian Godon (FRA)	Decathlon–AG2R La Mondiale	+ 0"
3	Guillaume Martin (FRA)	Cofidis	+ 0"
4	Stephen Williams (GBR)	Israel–Premier Tech	+ 0"
5	Patrick Konrad (AUT)	Lidl–Trek	+ 0"
6	Sergio Higuita (COL)	Bora–Hansgrohe	+ 0"
7	David González (ESP)	Caja Rural–Seguros RGA	+ 0"
8	Antonio Tiberi (ITA)	Team Bahrain Victorious	+ 0"
9	Aleksandr Vlasov	Bora–Hansgrohe	+ 0"
10	Wout Poels (NED)	Team Bahrain Victorious	+ 0"

General classification after Stage 7 (1–10)
Rank	Rider	Team	Time
1	Tadej Pogačar (SLO)	UAE Team Emirates	28h 21' 29"
2	Mikel Landa (ESP)	Soudal–Quick-Step	+ 3' 41"
3	Egan Bernal (COL)	Ineos Grenadiers	+ 5' 03"
4	Aleksandr Vlasov	Bora–Hansgrohe	+ 5' 56"
5	Enric Mas (ESP)	Movistar Team	+ 6' 01"
6	Chris Harper (AUS)	Team Jayco–AlUla	+ 6' 01"
7	Lenny Martinez (FRA)	Groupama–FDJ	+ 6' 02"
8	Antonio Tiberi (ITA)	Team Bahrain Victorious	+ 6' 33"
9	João Almeida (POR)	UAE Team Emirates	+ 6' 33"
10	Lorenzo Fortunato (ITA)	Astana Qazaqstan Team	+ 7' 27"

== Classification leadership table ==
Classification leadership by stage
Stage	Winner	General classification	Points classification	Mountains classification	Young rider classification	Team classification	Combativity award
1	Nick Schultz	Nick Schultz	Nick Schultz	Kenny Elissonde	Axel Laurance	Israel–Premier Tech	Mikel Bizkarra
2	Tadej Pogačar	Tadej Pogačar	Tadej Pogačar	Tadej Pogačar	Lenny Martinez	UAE Team Emirates	Álex Jaime
3	Tadej Pogačar	Tadej Pogačar	Tadej Pogačar	Tadej Pogačar	Lenny Martinez	Movistar Team	Harold Tejada
4	Marijn van den Berg	Tadej Pogačar	Tadej Pogačar	Tadej Pogačar	Lenny Martinez	Movistar Team	Urko Berrade
5	Axel Laurance	Tadej Pogačar	Tadej Pogačar	Tadej Pogačar	Lenny Martinez	Movistar Team	Óscar Rodríguez
6	Tadej Pogačar	Tadej Pogačar	Tadej Pogačar	Tadej Pogačar	Lenny Martinez	Team Bahrain Victorious	Tadej Pogačar
7	Tadej Pogačar	Tadej Pogačar	Tadej Pogačar	Tadej Pogačar	Lenny Martinez	Team Bahrain Victorious	Ander Okamika
Final		Tadej Pogačar	Tadej Pogačar	Tadej Pogačar	Lenny Martinez	Team Bahrain Victorious	Not awarded

== Classification standings ==
Legend
Denotes the winner of the general classification	Denotes the winner of the young rider classification
Denotes the winner of the points classification	Denotes the winner of the team classification
Denotes the winner of the mountains classification	Denotes the winner of the combativity award

=== General classification ===
Final general classification (1–10)
Rank	Rider	Team	Time
1	Tadej Pogačar (SLO)	UAE Team Emirates	28h 21' 29"
2	Mikel Landa (ESP)	Soudal–Quick-Step	+ 3' 41"
3	Egan Bernal (COL)	Ineos Grenadiers	+ 5' 03"
4	Aleksandr Vlasov	Bora–Hansgrohe	+ 5' 56"
5	Enric Mas (ESP)	Movistar Team	+ 6' 01"
6	Chris Harper (AUS)	Team Jayco–AlUla	+ 6' 01"
7	Lenny Martinez (FRA)	Groupama–FDJ	+ 6' 02"
8	Antonio Tiberi (ITA)	Team Bahrain Victorious	+ 6' 33"
9	João Almeida (POR)	UAE Team Emirates	+ 6' 33"
10	Lorenzo Fortunato (ITA)	Astana Qazaqstan Team	+ 7' 27"

=== Points classification ===
Final points classification (1–10)
Rank	Rider	Team	Points
1	Tadej Pogačar (SLO)	UAE Team Emirates	51
2	Mikel Landa (ESP)	Soudal–Quick-Step	18
3	Nick Schultz (AUS)	Israel–Premier Tech	10
4	Axel Laurance (FRA)	Alpecin–Deceuninck	10
5	Egan Bernal (COL)	Ineos Grenadiers	10
6	Idar Andersen (NOR)	Uno-X Mobility	9
7	Jimmy Janssens (BEL)	Alpecin–Deceuninck	8
8	Aleksandr Vlasov	Bora–Hansgrohe	7
9	Antonio Tiberi (ITA)	Team Bahrain Victorious	7
10	Hugh Carthy (GBR)	EF Education–EasyPost	6

=== Mountains classification ===
Final mountains classification (1–10)
Rank	Rider	Team	Points
1	Tadej Pogačar (SLO)	UAE Team Emirates	103
2	Mikel Landa (ESP)	Soudal–Quick-Step	70
3	Harold Tejada (COL)	Astana Qazaqstan Team	37
4	Marc Soler (ESP)	UAE Team Emirates	35
5	Egan Bernal (COL)	Ineos Grenadiers	29
6	Aleksandr Vlasov	Bora–Hansgrohe	27
7	João Almeida (POR)	UAE Team Emirates	24
8	Attila Valter (HUN)	Visma–Lease a Bike	21
9	Steven Kruijswijk (NED)	Visma–Lease a Bike	20
10	Antonio Tiberi (ITA)	Team Bahrain Victorious	19

=== Young rider classification ===
Final young rider classification (1–10)
Rank	Rider	Team	Time
1	Lenny Martinez (FRA)	Groupama–FDJ	28h 27' 31"
2	Antonio Tiberi (ITA)	Team Bahrain Victorious	+ 31"
3	Johannes Kulset (NOR)	Uno-X Mobility	+ 9' 13"
4	Valentin Paret-Peintre (FRA)	Decathlon–AG2R La Mondiale	+ 15' 08"
5	Pablo Castrillo (ESP)	Equipo Kern Pharma	+ 15' 43"
6	Darren Rafferty (IRL)	EF Education–EasyPost	+ 17' 38"
7	William Junior Lecerf (BEL)	Soudal–Quick-Step	+ 18' 31"
8	Georg Steinhauser (GER)	EF Education–EasyPost	+ 37' 37"
9	Edoardo Zambanini (ITA)	Team Bahrain Victorious	+ 43' 11"
10	Jorge Gutiérrez (ESP)	Equipo Kern Pharma	+ 49' 17"

=== Team classification ===
Final team classification (1–10)
Rank	Team	Time
1	Team Bahrain Victorious	85h 32' 47"
2	(Spain) Movistar Team	+ 2' 08"
3	(United Kingdom) Ineos Grenadiers	+ 2' 09"
4	(Belgium) Soudal–Quick-Step	+ 7' 25"
5	(United Arab Emirates) UAE Team Emirates	+ 16' 36"
6	(United States) EF Education–EasyPost	+ 16' 42"
7	(Netherlands) Visma–Lease a Bike	+ 17' 08"
8	(France) Decathlon–AG2R La Mondiale	+ 20' 25"
9	(Germany) Bora–Hansgrohe	+ 28' 19"
10	Israel–Premier Tech	+ 36' 56"
