= Harrison Wood =

British cyclist

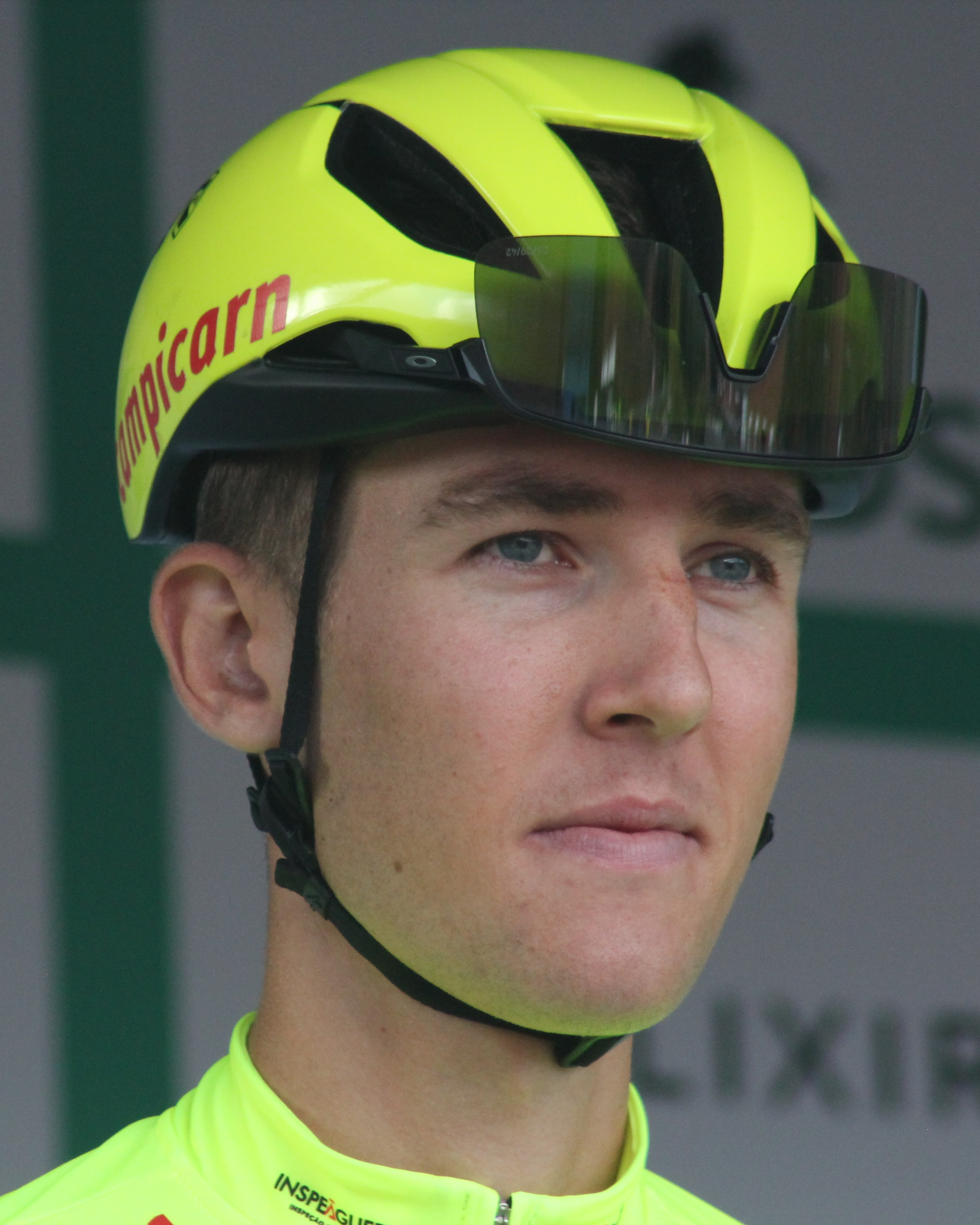
- Harrison Wood in 2025

Personal information
- Born: 14 June 2000 (age 26) Torquay, England
- Height: 1.85 m (6 ft 1 in)
- Weight: 64 kg (141 lb)

Cycling career
- Sport: Cycling
- Current team: Cofidis
- Discipline: Road
- Role: Rider

Amateur teams
- 2017: HMT JLT Condor
- 2018: HMT Hospitals Giant
- 2018: CT Soenens–Boom
- 2019: AVC Aix-en-Provence
- 2022: AVC Aix-en-Provence

Professional teams
- 2020–2021: SEG Racing Academy
- 2022: Cofidis (stagiaire)
- 2023–: Cofidis

Harrison Wood (born 14 June 2000) is a British professional racing cyclist, who currently rides for UCI WorldTeam Cofidis.

== Major results ==
2018
1st Mountains classification, Junior Tour of Wales
2019
9th Chrono des Nations U23
2021
8th International Rhodes Grand Prix
2022
1st Stage 2 Vuelta al Bidasoa
2nd Overall Vuelta a Navarra

=== Grand Tour general classification results timeline ===
| Grand Tour | 2024 |
|---|---|
| Giro d'Italia | 66 |
| Tour de France | |
| Vuelta a España | |

Legend
| — | Did not compete |
| DNF | Did not finish |
