= Antonio Tiberi =

Italian cyclist (born 2001)

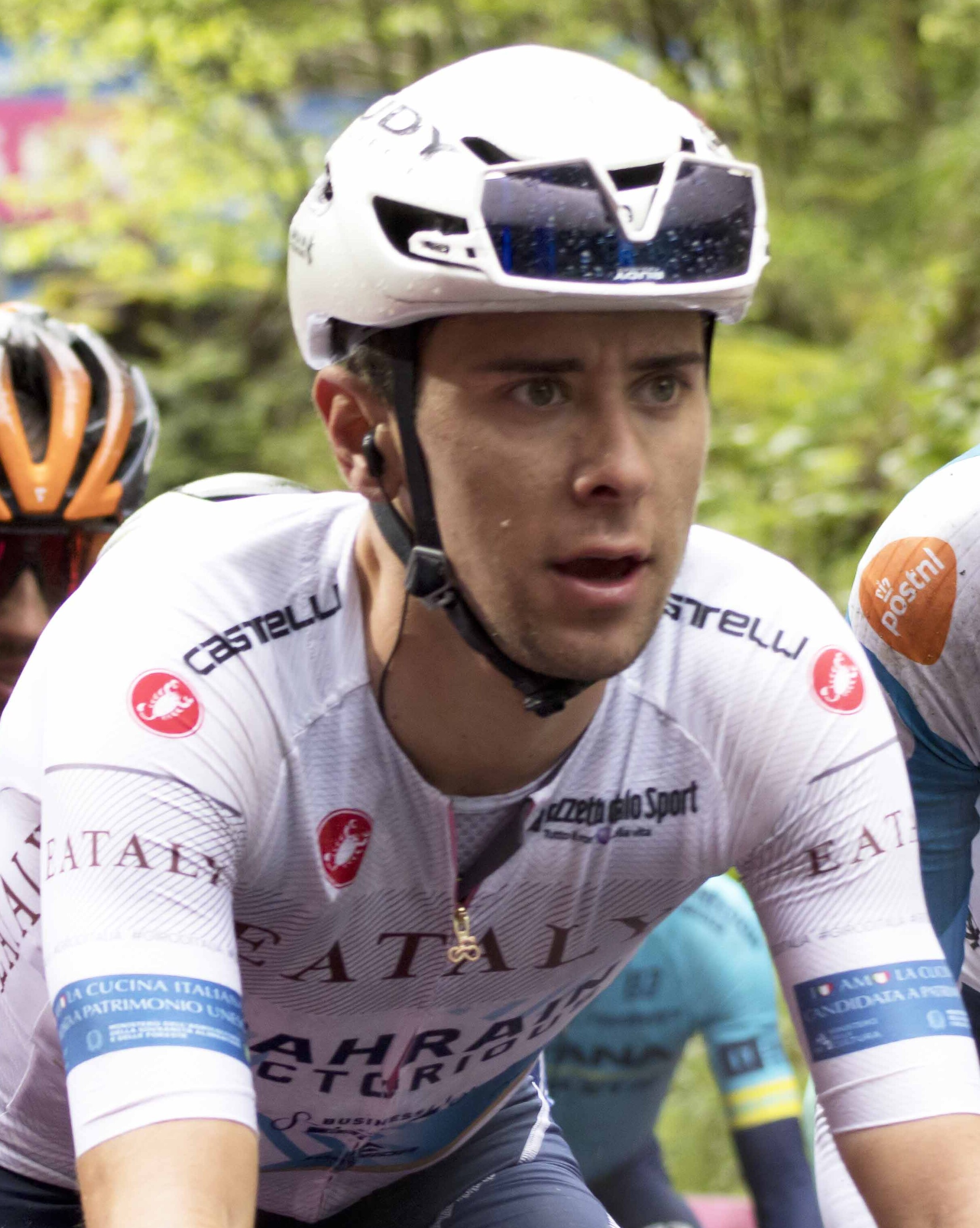
- Tiberi at the 2024 Giro d'Italia

Personal information
- Full name: Antonio Tiberi
- Born: 24 June 2001 (age 25) Frosinone, Italy

Cycling career
- Sport: Cycling
- Current team: Team Bahrain Victorious
- Discipline: Road
- Role: Rider
- Rider type: Climber

Amateur team
- 2018–2019: Team Franco Ballerini Primigi Store

Professional teams
- 2020: Team Colpack–Ballan
- 2020: Trek–Segafredo (stagiaire)
- 2021–2023: Trek–Segafredo
- 2023–: Team Bahrain Victorious

Major wins
- Grand Tours Giro d'Italia Young rider classification (2024) Stage races Tour de Luxembourg (2024)
Medal record
Representing Italy
Men's road bicycle racing
World Championships
Gold medal – first place	2019 Yorkshire	Junior time trial
European Championships
Bronze medal – third place	2018 Brno	Junior time trial

Antonio Tiberi (born 24 June 2001) is an Italian road cyclist, who currently rides for UCI WorldTeam Team Bahrain Victorious.

== Career ==
Tiberi won the men's junior time trial at the 2019 UCI Road World Championships, overcoming a crank failure before the first corner of the course which forced him to change bikes.

He signed with Trek–Segafredo in September 2019.

It was published on 28 February 2023 that Tiberi was fined €4,000 in San Marino for shooting and killing a cat with his air rifle in June 2022. His team Trek–Segafredo suspended Tiberi for 20 days, causing him to miss multiple races. Two months later Trek–Segafredo announced they terminated Tiberi's contract and that he was free to sign with another team.

He joined Team Bahrain Victorious on June 1, 2023. He finished 18th at the 2023 Vuelta a España. He rode in the 2024 Giro d’Italia where he finished fifth overall.

== Major results ==
2018
2nd Time trial, National Junior Road Championships
2nd Trofeo Citta di Loano
3rd Time trial, UEC European Junior Road Championships
6th Overall Course de la Paix Juniors

1st Young rider classification

9th Road race, UCI Junior Road World Championships
9th Trofeo Buffoni
9th Gran Premio dell'Arno
2019
1st Time trial, UCI Junior Road World Championships
1st Trofeo Guido Dorigo
1st Mountains classification, Giro della Lunigiana
3rd Time trial, National Junior Road Championships
6th Time trial, UEC European Junior Road Championships
7th Overall Course de la Paix Juniors

1st Stages 2a (ITT) & 3

8th Gent–Wevelgem Juniors
9th Trofeo Buffoni
2020
1st Trofeo Città di San Vendemiano
3rd Time trial, National Under-23 Road Championships
2021
3rd Overall Tour de Hongrie
2022 (1 pro win)
1st Stage 5 Tour de Hongrie
5th Overall Settimana Internazionale di Coppi e Bartali
8th GP Industria & Artigianato
2023
5th Time trial, National Road Championships
7th Overall UAE Tour
8th Overall Tour Down Under
9th Gran Piemonte
2024 (1)
1st Overall Tour de Luxembourg

1st Young rider classification

3rd Overall Tour of the Alps

1st Young rider classification

5th Overall Giro d'Italia

1st Young rider classification

8th Overall Volta a Catalunya
Vuelta a España

Held after Stages 4–5 & 7–8

2025
2nd Overall Tour de Pologne
3rd Overall Tirreno–Adriatico
Combativity award Stage 17 Vuelta a España
2026 (1)
2nd Overall UAE Tour

1st Stage 3

3rd Trofeo Laigueglia
4th Overall Volta a la Comunitat Valenciana
6th GP Industria & Artigianato di Larciano
8th Giro della Toscana
8th Memorial Marco Pantani

=== General classification results timeline ===
Grand Tour	2021	2022	2023	2024	2025
Giro d'Italia	—	—	—	5	17
Tour de France	—	—	—	—	—
Vuelta a España	—	92	18	DNF	41
Major stage race general classification results
Stage races	2021	2022	2023	2024	2025
Paris–Nice	—	—	—	—	—
Tirreno–Adriatico	—	—	—	27	3
Volta a Catalunya	—	—	—	8	
Tour of the Basque Country	—	—	—	—	—
Tour de Romandie	33	72	—	—	—
Critérium du Dauphiné	—	66	—	DNF	—
Tour de Suisse	DNF	—	DNF	—	—

Legend
—	Did not compete
DNF	Did not finish
