= Jan Hirt =

Czech cyclist (born 1991)

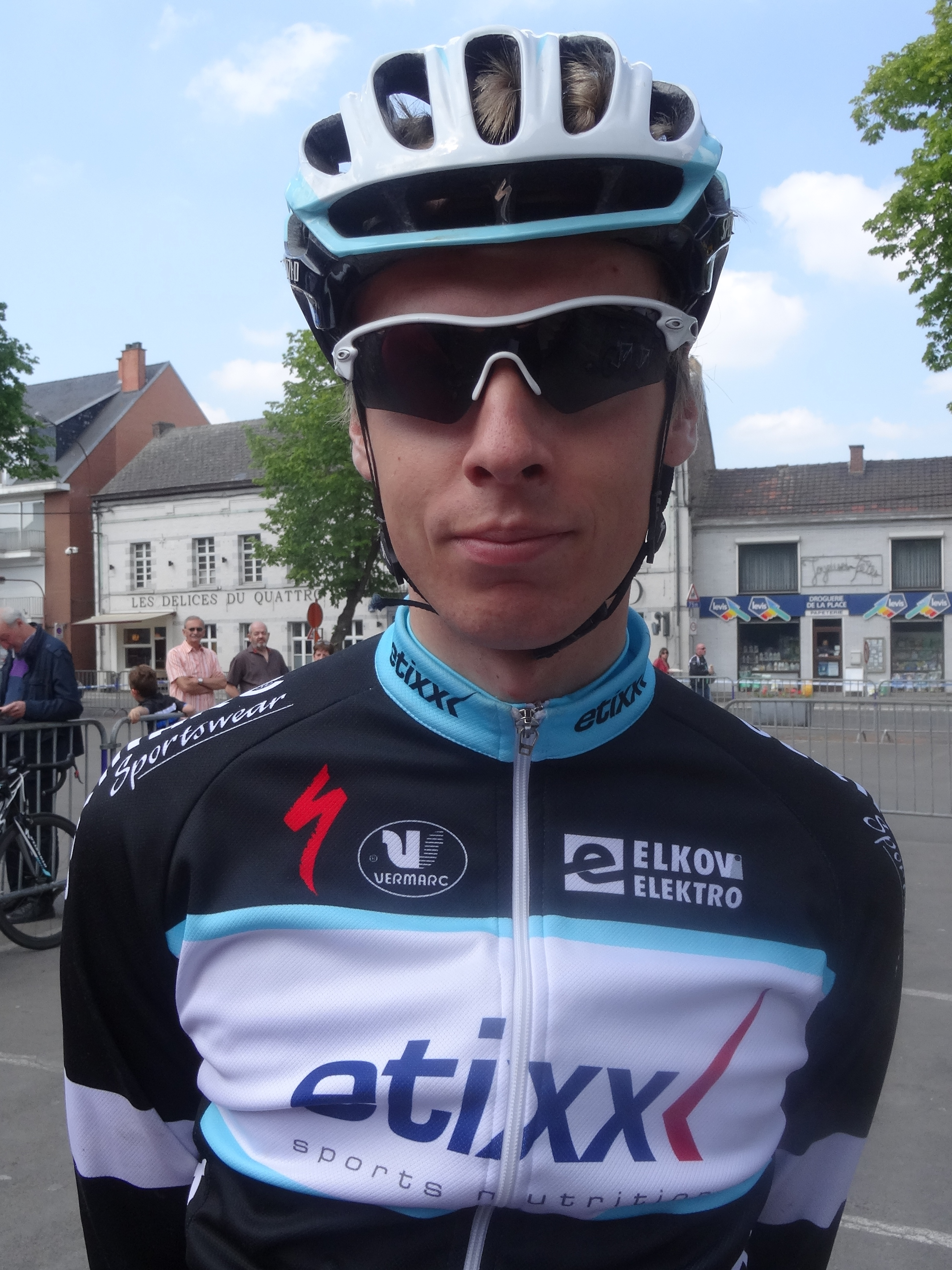
- Hirt in 2014

Personal information
- Full name: Jan Hirt
- Born: 21 January 1991 (age 35): Třebíč, Czechoslovakia; (now Czech Republic)
- Height: 1.81 m (5 ft 11 in)
- Weight: 62 kg (137 lb)

Cycling career
- Sport: Cycling
- Current team: NSN Cycling Team
- Discipline: Road
- Role: Rider
- Rider type: Climber

Amateur teams
- 2012: Podenzano Tecninox
- 2012: Leopard–Trek Continental Team (stagiaire)

Professional teams
- 2013: Leopard–Trek Continental Team
- 2014: Etixx
- 2015–2017: CCC–Sprandi–Polkowice
- 2018–2019: Astana
- 2020: CCC Team
- 2021–2022: Intermarché–Wanty–Gobert Matériaux
- 2023–2024: Soudal–Quick-Step
- 2025–: Israel–Premier Tech

Major wins
- Grand Tours Giro d'Italia 1 individual stage (2022) Stage races Tour of Oman (2022)

Jan Hirt (born 21 January 1991) is a Czech professional racing cyclist, who currently rides for UCI ProTeam NSN Cycling Team.

== Career ==
Hirt joined Leopard–Trek Continental Team in 2012 as a stagiaire, later becoming a member of the team in 2013 before moving to Etixx the following year. During the 2014 season, he came third in the general classification (GC) of the Tour Alsace, four seconds behind Jack Haig and ten seconds behind winner Karel Hnik. In 2015, Hirt moved to CCC–Sprandi–Polkowice where he competed in the Tour of Austria, Tour de Suisse, Tour of Turkey, Volta a Catalunya, Tour de Pologne, and the Il Lombardia in the same year. He achieved success in Austria, coming second on the fourth stage to move to the top of the GC before moving down to third where he later finished. However, Hirt did not finish the Il Lombardia.

In 2016, Hirt again competed in the Tour of Austria where he won the fourth stage to move into the lead of the GC. He started the next stage with a 1:17 lead over second-placed Guillaume Martin, a gap which he held to the end of the competition three days later. He also competed in the Abu Dhabi Tour, Tour de Suisse, Tour of Turkey, Volta a Catalunya, and the Il Lombardia, where he again did not finish. In 2017, Hirt competed in his first Grand Tour, the Giro d'Italia where he placed 12th in the GC. He also competed in the Tour de Suisse, Tour de Pologne, and the Volta a Catalunya and in August signed a two-year deal with Astana for the 2018 season. Cyclingnews.com described Hirt as a "key GC addition" to the team.

In 2018, Hirt competed in two Grand Tours, the Vuelta a España and the Giro, where he finished 74th and 46th, respectively. He also competed in the Il Lombardia, Volta a Catalunya, Tour of Oman, and the Tour of the Alps, where he finished 10th in the GC.

After two seasons with Astana, Hirt joined CCC Team for one year before moving to Intermarché–Wanty–Gobert Matériaux in 2021. The following year, he took his first wins since 2016 and the biggest of his career at the Tour of Oman, winning stage five and the overall classification. Three months later, in May, he won stage 16 of the Giro d'Italia, ultimately finishing 6th overall.

In 2023, Hirt joined Soudal–Quick-Step on a two-year contract. At the 2024 Tour of Oman, he finished second overall, 19 seconds off Adam Yates.

== Major results ==
2008
1st Stage 4 Tour du Pays de Vaud
2009
1st Road race, National Junior Road Championships
1st Overall GP Général Patton

1st Stage 2

2012
5th Overall Okolo Slovenska

1st Young rider classification

9th Overall Czech Cycling Tour
2013
1st Stage 1 (TTT) Czech Cycling Tour
2nd Overall Peace Race U23
4th Overall Tour Alsace
7th Overall Settimana Ciclistica Lombarda
8th Overall Tour d'Azerbaïdjan

1st Stage 4

2014
3rd Overall Tour Alsace
3rd Grand Prix Královéhradeckého kraje
6th Overall Szlakiem Grodów Piastowskich
8th Overall Czech Cycling Tour

1st Czech rider classification
1st Stage 3

2015
3rd Overall Tour of Austria
8th Visegrad 4 Bicycle Race – GP Czech Republic
8th Visegrad 4 Bicycle Race – GP Polski
10th Overall Szlakiem Grodów Piastowskich
2016 (2 pro wins)
1st Overall Tour of Austria

1st Stage 4

2017
3rd Overall Tour of Croatia
5th Overall Czech Cycling Tour
6th Pro Ötztaler 5500
2018
10th Overall Tour of the Alps
2019
5th Overall Tour de Suisse
7th Overall Tour of the Alps
2021
7th Overall Czech Cycling Tour

1st Czech rider classification

2022 (3)
1st Overall Tour of Oman

1st Stage 5

5th Road race, National Road Championships
6th Overall Giro d'Italia

1st Stage 16

2024
2nd Overall Tour of Oman
8th Overall Giro d'Italia
2026
9th Overall Czech Tour

=== Grand Tour general classification results timeline ===
Grand Tour	2017	2018	2019	2020	2021	2022	2023	2024
Giro d'Italia	12	46	27	—	26	6	DNF	8
Tour de France	—	—	—	67	—	—	—	
Vuelta a España	—	74	—	56	28	DNF	59	

Legend
—	Did not compete
DNF	Did not finish
