= Lorenzo Fortunato =

Italian cyclist (born 1996)

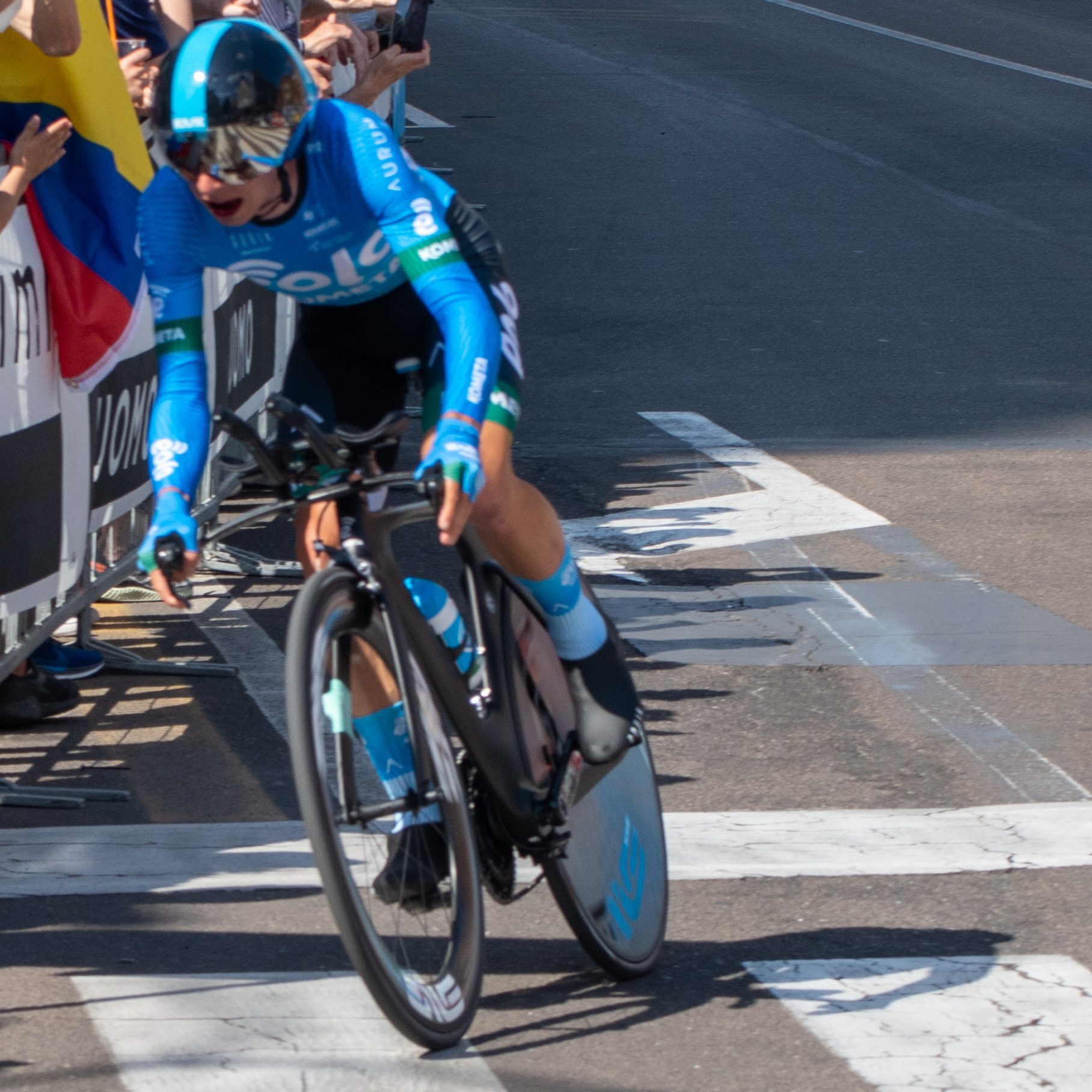
- Fortunato at the 2021 Giro d'Italia

Personal information
- Full name: Lorenzo Fortunato
- Born: 9 May 1996 (age 30) Bologna, Italy
- Height: 1.7 m (5 ft 7 in)
- Weight: 59 kg (130 lb)

Cycling career
- Sport: Cycling
- Current team: XDS Astana Team
- Discipline: Road
- Role: Rider
- Rider type: Climber

Amateur teams
- 2015: Mastromarco Sensi Dover Cipras
- 2016–2018: Hopplà–Petroli Firenze
- 2016: Tinkoff (stagiaire)
- 2017: Bardiani–CSF (stagiaire)

Professional teams
- 2019–2020: Neri Sottoli–Selle Italia–KTM
- 2021–2023: Eolo–Kometa
- 2024–: Astana Qazaqstan Team

Major wins
- Grand Tours Giro d'Italia Mountains classification (2025) 1 individual stage (2021) Combativity award (2025)

Lorenzo Fortunato (born 9 May 1996) is an Italian cyclist, who currently rides for UCI WorldTeam XDS Astana Team.

Fortunato had his first professional win at the 2021 Giro d'Italia, which was also his first Grand Tour, when he soloed to win stage 14 atop the Monte Zoncolan after dropping Jan Tratnik 2.3 kilometers from the finish. He ended up finishing 26 seconds ahead of Tratnik, and 59 seconds ahead of third place Alessandro Covi.

== Major results ==
2013
1st Trofeo Guido Dorigo
2nd Gran Premio Sportivi di Sovilla
5th Road race, UEC European Junior Road Championships
8th Overall Giro di Basilicata
2014
3rd Overall GP Général Patton

1st Points classification

8th Road race, UCI Junior Road World Championships
8th Gran Premio Sportivi di Sovilla
2017
10th Trofeo Piva
2018
6th Overall Giro della Valle d'Aosta
6th Gran Premio Sportivi di Poggiana
8th Coppa della Pace
9th GP Capodarco
2019
4th Overall Tour of Albania
6th Overall Tour of Almaty
2020
8th Overall Tour de Langkawi
2021 (3 pro wins)
1st Overall Adriatica Ionica Race

1st Mountains classification
1st Stage 2

1st Stage 14 Giro d'Italia
8th Overall Giro di Sicilia
2022
1st Mountains classification, Okolo Slovenska
2nd Overall Vuelta a Asturias
6th Giro dell'Emilia
7th Overall Adriatica Ionica Race
2023 (2)
1st Overall Vuelta a Asturias

1st Stage 2

5th Overall Tour of the Alps
6th Overall Tour of Slovenia
2024
1st Mountains classification, Critérium du Dauphiné
8th Overall Tour of Guangxi
10th Overall Volta a Catalunya
10th Giro dell'Emilia
2025 (1)
Giro d'Italia

1st Mountains classification
Combativity award Stages 8, 16 & 17 and Overall

2nd Overall Vuelta a Burgos
3rd Ardèche Classic
4th Overall Tour de Romandie

1st Stage 2

5th Overall Tour des Alpes-Maritimes
5th Vuelta a Murcia
8th Milano–Torino
10th La Drôme Classic
2026
6th Coppa Agostoni
7th Giro dell'Emilia
8th Milano–Torino
9th Overall Tour de Romandie
10th Overall Vuelta a Burgos

=== Grand Tour general classification results timeline ===
Grand Tour	2021	2022	2023	2024
Giro d'Italia	16	15	21	12
Tour de France	—	—	—	—
Vuelta a España	—	—	—	16

Legend
—	Did not compete
DNF	Did not finish
