= List of teams and cyclists in the 2025 Giro d'Italia =

List of cyclists

The following is a list of teams and cyclists who participated in the 2025 Giro d'Italia.

== Teams ==
Twenty-three teams took part in the race. All 18 UCI WorldTeams were automatically invited. They were joined by five UCI ProTeams: one of the two highest ranked UCI ProTeams in 2024 (Israel–Premier Tech), along with four teams selected by RCS Sport, the organisers of the Tour.

Union Cycliste Internationale (UCI) rules allow twenty-two teams to enter a Grand Tour – eighteen UCI WorldTeams, the two highest ranked UCI ProTeams from the previous season and two teams invited by the organisers. Grand Tour race organisers ASO and RCS Sport asked the UCI to allow an additional wildcard team to be invited to Grand Tour events, after lobbying from smaller teams competing for the wildcard slots. Larger teams were reported to not support the request, with Visma–Lease a Bike noting that an additional team would decrease safety. In March 2025, the UCI announced that twenty-three teams would be permitted in 2025, allowing an additional ProTeam to be invited. RCS Sport announced the teams on 31 March 2025.

UCI WorldTeams

- Alpecin–Deceuninck
- Arkéa–B&B Hotels
- Cofidis
- Decathlon–AG2R La Mondiale
- EF Education–EasyPost
- Groupama–FDJ
- INEOS Grenadiers
- Intermarché–Wanty
- Lidl–Trek
- Movistar Team
- Red Bull–Bora–Hansgrohe
- Soudal–Quick-Step
- Team Bahrain Victorious
- Team Picnic–PostNL
- Team Jayco–AlUla
- UAE Team Emirates XRG
- Visma–Lease a Bike
- XDS Astana Team

UCI ProTeams

- Israel–Premier Tech
- Q36.5 Pro Cycling Team
- Team Polti VisitMalta
- Tudor Pro Cycling Team
- VF Group–Bardiani–CSF–Faizanè

== Cyclists ==
Legend
No.	Starting number worn by the rider during the Giro
Pos.	Position in the general classification
Time	Deficit to the winner of the general classification
‡	Denotes riders born on or after 1 January 2000 eligible for the young rider classification
General classification	Denotes the winner of the general classification
Points classification	Denotes the winner of the points classification
Mountains classification	Denotes the winner of the mountains classification
Young rider classification	Denotes the winner of the young rider classification (eligibility indicated by ‡)
Combativity award	Denotes the winner of the combativity award
DNS	Denotes a rider who did not start a stage, followed by the stage before which he withdrew
DNF	Denotes a rider who did not finish a stage, followed by the stage in which he withdrew
DSQ	Denotes a rider who was disqualified from the race, followed by the stage in which this occurred
HD	Denotes a rider finished outside the time limit, followed by the stage in which they did so
Ages correct as of Friday 9 May 2025, the date on which the Giro begins

=== By starting number ===
No.	Name	Nationality	Team	Age	Pos.	Time	Ref.
1	Primož Roglič	Slovenia	Red Bull–Bora–Hansgrohe	35	DNF-16	–	
2	Giovanni Aleotti	Italy	Red Bull–Bora–Hansgrohe	25	59	+ 2h 44' 16"	
3	Nico Denz	Germany	Red Bull–Bora–Hansgrohe	31	122	+ 5h 05' 18"	
4	Jai Hindley	Australia	Red Bull–Bora–Hansgrohe	29	DNF-6	–	
5	Daniel Martínez	Colombia	Red Bull–Bora–Hansgrohe	29	53	+ 2h 29' 40"	
6	Gianni Moscon	Italy	Red Bull–Bora–Hansgrohe	31	121	+ 5h 05' 00"	
7	Giulio Pellizzari ‡	Italy	Red Bull–Bora–Hansgrohe	21	6	+ 9' 28"	
8	Jan Tratnik	Slovenia	Red Bull–Bora–Hansgrohe	35	83	+ 3h 39' 12"	
11	Kaden Groves	Australia	Alpecin–Deceuninck	26	107	+ 4h 31' 34"	
12	Quinten Hermans	Belgium	Alpecin–Deceuninck	29	85	+ 3h 43' 42"	
13	Juri Hollmann	Germany	Alpecin–Deceuninck	25	DNF-6	–	
14	Jimmy Janssens	Belgium	Alpecin–Deceuninck	35	118	+ 4h 55' 09"	
15	Timo Kielich	Belgium	Alpecin–Deceuninck	25	86	+ 3h 49' 45"	
16	Edward Planckaert	Belgium	Alpecin–Deceuninck	30	102	+ 4h 22' 44"	
17	Fabio Van den Bossche ‡	Belgium	Alpecin–Deceuninck	24	100	+ 4h 18' 23"	
18	Jensen Plowright ‡	Australia	Alpecin–Deceuninck	24	158	+ 6h 07' 50"	
21	Alessandro Verre ‡	Italy	Arkéa–B&B Hotels	23	104	+ 4h 26' 38"	
22	Giosuè Epis ‡	Italy	Arkéa–B&B Hotels	23	135	+ 5h 31' 00"	
23	Simon Guglielmi	France	Arkéa–B&B Hotels	27	94	+ 4h 03' 10"	
24	Laurens Huys	Belgium	Arkéa–B&B Hotels	26	109	+ 4h 36' 42"	
25	Luca Mozzato	Italy	Arkéa–B&B Hotels	27	138	+ 5h 33' 26"	
26	Michel Ries	Luxembourg	Arkéa–B&B Hotels	27	DNS-7	–	
27	Embret Svestad-Bårdseng ‡	Norway	Arkéa–B&B Hotels	22	22	+ 1h 06' 40"	
28	Martin Tjøtta ‡	Norway	Arkéa–B&B Hotels	24	49	+ 2h 26' 05"	
31	Antonio Tiberi ‡	Italy	Team Bahrain Victorious	23	17	+ 46' 04"	
32	Pello Bilbao	Spain	Team Bahrain Victorious	35	30	+ 1h 52' 02"	
33	Damiano Caruso	Italy	Team Bahrain Victorious	37	5	+ 7' 32"	
34	Afonso Eulálio ‡	Portugal	Team Bahrain Victorious	23	DNF-19	–	
35	Matevž Govekar ‡	Slovenia	Team Bahrain Victorious	25	142	+ 5h 38' 24"	
36	Fran Miholjević ‡	Croatia	Team Bahrain Victorious	22	113	+ 4h 46' 16"	
37	Andrea Pasqualon	Italy	Team Bahrain Victorious	37	DNF-9	–	
38	Edoardo Zambanini ‡	Italy	Team Bahrain Victorious	24	27	+ 1h 25' 59"	
41	Milan Fretin ‡	Belgium	Cofidis	24	DNS-16	–	
42	Nicolas Debeaumarché	France	Cofidis	27	140	+ 5h 34' 38"	
43	Jonathan Lastra	Spain	Cofidis	31	65	+ 3h 04' 36"	
44	Jan Maas	Netherlands	Cofidis	29	139	+ 5h 34' 04"	
45	Sylvain Moniquet	Belgium	Cofidis	27	71	+ 3h 15' 48"	
46	Stefano Oldani	Italy	Cofidis	27	67	+ 3h 07' 43"	
47	Anthony Perez	France	Cofidis	34	124	+ 5h 08' 15"	
48	Sergio Samitier	Spain	Cofidis	29	52	+ 2h 28' 09"	
51	Sam Bennett	Ireland	Decathlon–AG2R La Mondiale	34	145	+ 5h 41' 25"	
52	Geoffrey Bouchard	France	Decathlon–AG2R La Mondiale	33	DNF-1	–	
53	Dries De Bondt	Belgium	Decathlon–AG2R La Mondiale	33	128	+ 5h 13' 22"	
54	Stan Dewulf	Belgium	Decathlon–AG2R La Mondiale	27	111	+ 4h 40' 33"	
55	Dorian Godon	France	Decathlon–AG2R La Mondiale	28	84	+ 3h 40' 14"	
56	Tord Gudmestad ‡	Norway	Decathlon–AG2R La Mondiale	24	134	+ 5h 30' 25"	
57	Nicolas Prodhomme	France	Decathlon–AG2R La Mondiale	28	15	+ 36' 09"	
58	Andrea Vendrame	Italy	Decathlon–AG2R La Mondiale	30	35	+ 1h 59' 53"	
61	Richard Carapaz	Ecuador	EF Education–EasyPost	31	3	+ 4' 43"	
62	Kasper Asgreen	Denmark	EF Education–EasyPost	30	115	+ 4h 47' 04"	
63	Jefferson Alexander Cepeda	Ecuador	EF Education–EasyPost	26	51	+ 2h 27' 01"	
64	Owain Doull	Great Britain	EF Education–EasyPost	32	110	+ 4h 37' 02"	
65	Mikkel Frølich Honoré	Denmark	EF Education–EasyPost	28	79	+ 3h 34' 22"	
66	Darren Rafferty ‡	Ireland	EF Education–EasyPost	21	87	+ 3h 51' 51"	
67	James Shaw	Great Britain	EF Education–EasyPost	28	76	+ 3h 26' 18"	
68	Georg Steinhauser ‡	Germany	EF Education–EasyPost	23	74	+ 3h 22' 54"	
71	David Gaudu	France	Groupama–FDJ	28	66	+ 3h 06' 33"	
72	Sven Erik Bystrøm	Norway	Groupama–FDJ	33	130	+ 5h 23' 13"	
73	Clément Davy	France	Groupama–FDJ	26	137	+ 5h 32' 29"	
74	Kevin Geniets	Luxembourg	Groupama–FDJ	28	33	+ 1h 56' 33"	
75	Lorenzo Germani ‡	Italy	Groupama–FDJ	23	63	+ 2h 54' 25"	
76	Quentin Pacher	France	Groupama–FDJ	33	64	+ 2h 59' 12"	
77	Enzo Paleni ‡	France	Groupama–FDJ	22	112	+ 4h 42' 51"	
78	Rémy Rochas	France	Groupama–FDJ	28	39	+ 2h 11' 04"	
81	Egan Bernal	Colombia	INEOS Grenadiers	28	7	+ 12' 42"	
82	Thymen Arensman	Netherlands	INEOS Grenadiers	25	29	+ 1h 37' 46"	
83	Jonathan Castroviejo	Spain	INEOS Grenadiers	38	61	+ 2h 47' 31"	
84	Lucas Hamilton	Australia	INEOS Grenadiers	29	103	+ 4h 24' 28"	
85	Kim Heiduk ‡	Germany	INEOS Grenadiers	25	114	+ 4h 46' 33"	
86	Brandon Rivera	Colombia	INEOS Grenadiers	29	DNS-14	–	
87	Joshua Tarling ‡	Great Britain	INEOS Grenadiers	21	DNF-16	–	
88	Ben Turner	Great Britain	INEOS Grenadiers	25	120	+ 5h 03' 49"	
91	Louis Meintjes	South Africa	Intermarché–Wanty	33	18	+ 52' 03"	
92	Francesco Busatto ‡	Italy	Intermarché–Wanty	22	99	+ 4h 17' 40"	
93	Kevin Colleoni	Italy	Intermarché–Wanty	25	108	+ 4h 33' 00"	
94	Simone Petilli	Italy	Intermarché–Wanty	32	60	+ 2h 46' 21"	
95	Dion Smith	New Zealand	Intermarché–Wanty	32	DNF-6	–	
96	Gerben Thijssen	Belgium	Intermarché–Wanty	26	157	+ 6h 04' 31"	
97	Taco van der Hoorn	Netherlands	Intermarché–Wanty	31	155	+ 5h 57' 04"	
98	Gijs Van Hoecke	Belgium	Intermarché–Wanty	33	153	+ 5h 55' 56"	
101	Derek Gee	Canada	Israel–Premier Tech	27	4	+ 6' 23"	
102	Simon Clarke	Australia	Israel–Premier Tech	38	117	+ 4h 48' 51"	
103	Marco Frigo ‡	Italy	Israel–Premier Tech	25	28	+ 1h 32' 20"	
104	Jakob Fuglsang	Denmark	Israel–Premier Tech	40	81	+ 3h 36' 09"	
105	Jan Hirt	Czechia	Israel–Premier Tech	34	DNS-7	–	
106	Hugo Houle	Canada	Israel–Premier Tech	34	62	+ 2h 53' 29"	
107	Nick Schultz	Australia	Israel–Premier Tech	30	106	+ 4h 31' 19"	
109	Corbin Strong ‡	New Zealand	Israel–Premier Tech	25	96	+ 4h 07' 26"	
111	Giulio Ciccone	Italy	Lidl–Trek	30	DNS-15	–	
112	Daan Hoole	Netherlands	Lidl–Trek	26	119	+ 4h 57' 19"	
113	Patrick Konrad	Austria	Lidl–Trek	33	73	+ 3h 17' 41"	
114	Søren Kragh Andersen	Denmark	Lidl–Trek	30	DNS-5	–	
115	Jacopo Mosca	Italy	Lidl–Trek	31	126	+ 5h 09' 58"	
116	Mads Pedersen	Denmark	Lidl–Trek	29	90	+ 4h 00' 39"	
117	Mathias Vacek ‡	Czechia	Lidl–Trek	22	57	+ 2h 42' 59"	
118	Carlos Verona	Spain	Lidl–Trek	32	54	+ 2h 31' 09"	
121	Nairo Quintana	Colombia	Movistar Team	35	25	+ 1h 23' 09"	
122	Orluis Aular	Venezuela	Movistar Team	28	101	+ 4h 22' 20"	
123	Jon Barrenetxea ‡	Spain	Movistar Team	25	92	+ 4h 02' 34"	
124	Jefferson Alveiro Cepeda	Ecuador	Movistar Team	29	34	+ 1h 57' 52"	
125	Davide Formolo	Italy	Movistar Team	32	45	+ 2h 23' 27"	
126	Lorenzo Milesi ‡	Italy	Movistar Team	23	88	+ 3h 54' 04"	
127	Einer Rubio	Colombia	Movistar Team	27	8	+ 13' 05"	
128	Albert Torres	Spain	Movistar Team	35	127	+ 5h 11' 13"	
131	Tom Pidcock	Great Britain	Q36.5 Pro Cycling Team	25	16	+ 44' 41"	
132	Xabier Azparren	Spain	Q36.5 Pro Cycling Team	26	125	+ 5h 09' 49"	
133	Mark Donovan	Great Britain	Q36.5 Pro Cycling Team	26	55	+ 2h 37' 39"	
134	Damien Howson	Australia	Q36.5 Pro Cycling Team	32	46	+ 2h 23' 30"	
135	Emīls Liepiņš	Latvia	Q36.5 Pro Cycling Team	32	131	+ 5h 23' 42"	
136	Matteo Moschetti	Italy	Q36.5 Pro Cycling Team	28	152	+ 5h 55' 35"	
137	Milan Vader	Netherlands	Q36.5 Pro Cycling Team	29	80	+ 3h 34' 38"	
138	Nickolas Zukowsky	Canada	Q36.5 Pro Cycling Team	26	DNF-4	–	
141	Mikel Landa	Spain	Soudal–Quick-Step	35	DNF-1	–	
142	Mattia Cattaneo	Italy	Soudal–Quick-Step	34	44	+ 2h 23' 20"	
143	Josef Černý	Czechia	Soudal–Quick-Step	31	132	+ 5h 29' 33"	
144	Gianmarco Garofoli ‡	Italy	Soudal–Quick-Step	22	31	+ 1h 53' 53"	
145	Ethan Hayter	Great Britain	Soudal–Quick-Step	26	136	+ 5h 31' 39"	
146	James Knox	Great Britain	Soudal–Quick-Step	29	19	+ 56' 53"	
147	Luke Lamperti ‡	United States	Soudal–Quick-Step	22	146	+ 5h 41' 38"	
148	Paul Magnier ‡	France	Soudal–Quick-Step	21	DNS-16	–	
151	Chris Harper	Australia	Team Jayco–AlUla	30	23	+ 1h 13' 35"	
152	Koen Bouwman	Netherlands	Team Jayco–AlUla	31	DNS-9	–	
153	Davide De Pretto ‡	Italy	Team Jayco–AlUla	23	77	+ 3h 28' 54"	
154	Paul Double	Great Britain	Team Jayco–AlUla	28	98	+ 4h 16' 30"	
155	Felix Engelhardt ‡	Germany	Team Jayco–AlUla	24	82	+ 3h 37' 17"	
156	Michael Hepburn	Australia	Team Jayco–AlUla	33	143	+ 5h 38' 36"	
157	Luke Plapp ‡	Australia	Team Jayco–AlUla	24	DNF-17	–	
158	Filippo Zana	Italy	Team Jayco–AlUla	26	58	+ 2h 43' 24"	
161	Romain Bardet	France	Team Picnic–PostNL	34	26	+ 1h 24' 04"	
162	Alex Edmondson	Australia	Team Picnic–PostNL	31	148	+ 5h 42' 42"	
163	Chris Hamilton	Australia	Team Picnic–PostNL	29	47	+ 2h 23' 31"	
164	Gijs Leemreize	Netherlands	Team Picnic–PostNL	25	43	+ 2h 21' 52"	
165	Niklas Märkl	Germany	Team Picnic–PostNL	26	156	+ 5h 59' 46"	
166	Max Poole ‡	Great Britain	Team Picnic–PostNL	22	11	+ 18' 15"	
167	Casper van Uden ‡	Netherlands	Team Picnic–PostNL	23	150	+ 5h 48' 34"	
168	Bram Welten	Netherlands	Team Picnic–PostNL	28	DNF-7	–	
171	Davide Piganzoli ‡	Italy	Team Polti VisitMalta	22	14	+ 27' 53"	
172	Davide Bais	Italy	Team Polti VisitMalta	27	97	+ 4h 16' 09"	
173	Mattia Bais	Italy	Team Polti VisitMalta	28	69	+ 3h 11' 07"	
174	Giovanni Lonardi	Italy	Team Polti VisitMalta	28	129	+ 5h 20' 03"	
175	Mirco Maestri	Italy	Team Polti VisitMalta	33	93	+ 4h 02' 46"	
176	Francisco Muñoz ‡	Spain	Team Polti VisitMalta	23	144	+ 5h 41' 19"	
177	Andrea Pietrobon	Italy	Team Polti VisitMalta	26	141	+ 5h 36' 27"	
178	Alessandro Tonelli	Italy	Team Polti VisitMalta	32	48	+ 2h 23' 48"	
181	Wout van Aert	Belgium	Visma–Lease a Bike	30	72	+ 3h 16' 27"	
182	Edoardo Affini	Italy	Visma–Lease a Bike	28	133	+ 5h 29' 52"	
183	Wilco Kelderman	Netherlands	Visma–Lease a Bike	34	37	+ 2h 01' 00"	
184	Olav Kooij ‡	Netherlands	Visma–Lease a Bike	23	149	+ 5h 45' 37"	
185	Steven Kruijswijk	Netherlands	Visma–Lease a Bike	37	38	+ 2h 05' 13"	
186	Bart Lemmen	Netherlands	Visma–Lease a Bike	29	42	+ 2h 20' 47"	
187	Dylan van Baarle	Netherlands	Visma–Lease a Bike	32	95	+ 4h 07' 14"	
188	Simon Yates	Great Britain	Visma–Lease a Bike	32	1	82h 31' 01"	
191	Michael Storer	Australia	Tudor Pro Cycling Team	28	10	+ 14' 27"	
192	Marco Brenner ‡	Germany	Tudor Pro Cycling Team	22	DNF-19	–	
193	Alexander Krieger	Germany	Tudor Pro Cycling Team	33	159	+ 6h 25' 03"	
194	Rick Pluimers ‡	Netherlands	Tudor Pro Cycling Team	24	105	+ 4h 30' 38"	
195	Florian Stork	Germany	Tudor Pro Cycling Team	28	20	+ 58' 53"	
196	Yannis Voisard	Switzerland	Tudor Pro Cycling Team	26	32	+ 1h 56' 21"	
197	Larry Warbasse	United States	Tudor Pro Cycling Team	34	68	+ 3h 10' 00"	
198	Maikel Zijlaard	Netherlands	Tudor Pro Cycling Team	25	154	+ 5h 56' 04"	
201	Juan Ayuso ‡	Spain	UAE Team Emirates XRG	22	DNF-18	–	
202	Igor Arrieta ‡	Spain	UAE Team Emirates XRG	22	36	+ 2h 00' 15"	
203	Filippo Baroncini ‡	Italy	UAE Team Emirates XRG	24	78	+ 3h 30' 26"	
204	Isaac del Toro ‡	Mexico	UAE Team Emirates XRG	21	2	+ 3' 56"	
205	Rafał Majka	Poland	UAE Team Emirates XRG	35	13	+ 23' 46"	
206	Brandon McNulty	United States	UAE Team Emirates XRG	27	9	+ 13' 36"	
207	Jay Vine	Australia	UAE Team Emirates XRG	29	DNF-17	–	
208	Adam Yates	Great Britain	UAE Team Emirates XRG	32	12	+ 21' 43"	
211	Filippo Fiorelli	Italy	VF Group–Bardiani–CSF–Faizanè	30	89	+ 4h 00' 39"	
212	Luca Covili	Italy	VF Group–Bardiani–CSF–Faizanè	28	70	+ 3h 11' 24"	
213	Filippo Magli	Italy	VF Group–Bardiani–CSF–Faizanè	26	116	+ 4h 48' 45"	
214	Martin Marcellusi ‡	Italy	VF Group–Bardiani–CSF–Faizanè	25	75	+ 3h 23' 11"	
215	Alessio Martinelli ‡	Italy	VF Group–Bardiani–CSF–Faizanè	24	DNF-16	–	
216	Alessandro Pinarello ‡	Italy	VF Group–Bardiani–CSF–Faizanè	21	DNS-6	–	
217	Manuele Tarozzi	Italy	VF Group–Bardiani–CSF–Faizanè	26	91	+ 4h 01' 33"	
218	Enrico Zanoncello	Italy	VF Group–Bardiani–CSF–Faizanè	27	151	+ 5h 51' 33"	
221	Diego Ulissi	Italy	XDS Astana Team	35	21	+ 1h 05' 07"	
222	Nicola Conci	Italy	XDS Astana Team	28	56	+ 2h 40' 14"	
223	Lorenzo Fortunato	Italy	XDS Astana Team	29	24	+ 1h 22' 09"	
224	Max Kanter	Germany	XDS Astana Team	27	123	+ 5h 05' 26"	
225	Anton Kuzmin	Kazakhstan	XDS Astana Team	28	147	+ 5h 42' 03"	
226	Fausto Masnada	Italy	XDS Astana Team	31	41	+ 2h 12' 40"	
227	Wout Poels	Netherlands	XDS Astana Team	37	50	+ 2h 26' 25"	
228	Christian Scaroni	Italy	XDS Astana Team	27	40	+ 2h 11' 13"	

=== By team ===
(Germany) Red Bull–Bora–Hansgrohe (RBH)
No.	Rider	Pos.
1	Primož Roglič (SLO)	DNF-16
2	Giovanni Aleotti (ITA)	59
3	Nico Denz (GER)	122
4	Jai Hindley (AUS)	DNF-6
5	Daniel Martínez (COL)	53
6	Gianni Moscon (ITA)	121
7	Giulio Pellizzari (ITA)	6
8	Jan Tratnik (SLO)	83

(Belgium) Alpecin–Deceuninck (ADC)
No.	Rider	Pos.
11	Kaden Groves (AUS)	107
12	Quinten Hermans (BEL)	85
13	Juri Hollmann (BEL)	DNF-6
14	Jimmy Janssens (BEL)	118
15	Timo Kielich (BEL)	86
16	Edward Planckaert (BEL)	102
17	Fabio Van den Bossche (BEL)	100
18	Jensen Plowright (AUS)	158

(France) Arkéa–B&B Hotels (ARK)
No.	Rider	Pos.
21	Alessandro Verre (ITA)	104
22	Giosuè Epis (ITA)	135
23	Simon Guglielmi (FRA)	94
24	Laurens Huys (BEL)	109
25	Luca Mozzato (ITA)	138
26	Michel Ries (LUX)	DNS-7
27	Embret Svestad-Bårdseng (NOR)	22
28	Martin Tjøtta (NOR)	49

Team Bahrain Victorious (TBV)
No.	Rider	Pos.
31	Antonio Tiberi (ITA)	17
32	Pello Bilbao (ESP)	30
33	Damiano Caruso (ITA)	5
34	Afonso Eulálio (POR)	DNF-19
35	Matevž Govekar (SLO)	142
36	Fran Miholjević (CRO)	113
37	Andrea Pasqualon (ITA)	DNF-9
38	Edoardo Zambanini (ITA)	27

(France) Cofidis (COF)
No.	Rider	Pos.
41	Milan Fretin (BEL)	DNS-16
42	Nicolas Debeaumarché (FRA)	140
43	Jonathan Lastra (ESP)	65
44	Jan Maas (NED)	139
45	Sylvain Moniquet (BEL)	71
46	Stefano Oldani (ITA)	67
47	Anthony Perez (FRA)	124
48	Sergio Samitier (ESP)	52

(France) Decathlon–AG2R La Mondiale (DAT)
No.	Rider	Pos.
51	Sam Bennett (IRL)	145
52	Geoffrey Bouchard (FRA)	DNF-1
53	Dries De Bondt (BEL)	128
54	Stan Dewulf (BEL)	111
55	Dorian Godon (FRA)	84
56	Tord Gudmestad (NOR)	134
57	Nicolas Prodhomme (FRA)	15
58	Andrea Vendrame (ITA)	35

(United States) EF Education–EasyPost (EFE)
No.	Rider	Pos.
61	Richard Carapaz (ECU)	3
62	Kasper Asgreen (DEN)	115
63	Jefferson Alexander Cepeda (ECU)	51
64	Owain Doull (GBR)	110
65	Mikkel Frølich Honoré (DEN)	79
66	Darren Rafferty (IRL)	87
67	James Shaw (GBR)	76
68	Georg Steinhauser (GER)	74

(France) Groupama–FDJ (GFC)
No.	Rider	Pos.
71	David Gaudu (FRA)	66
72	Sven Erik Bystrøm (NOR)	130
73	Clément Davy (FRA)	137
74	Kevin Geniets (LUX)	33
75	Lorenzo Germani (ITA)	63
76	Quentin Pacher (FRA)	64
77	Enzo Paleni (FRA)	112
78	Rémy Rochas (FRA)	39

(United Kingdom) INEOS Grenadiers (IGD)
No.	Rider	Pos.
81	Egan Bernal (COL)	7
82	Thymen Arensman (NED)	29
83	Jonathan Castroviejo (ESP)	61
84	Lucas Hamilton (AUS)	103
85	Kim Heiduk (GER)	114
86	Brandon Rivera (COL)	DNS-14
87	Joshua Tarling (GBR)	DNF-16
88	Ben Turner (GBR)	120

(Belgium) Intermarché–Wanty (IWA)
No.	Rider	Pos.
91	Louis Meintjes (RSA)	18
92	Francesco Busatto (ITA)	99
93	Kevin Colleoni (ITA)	108
94	Simone Petilli (ITA)	60
95	Dion Smith (NZL)	DNF-6
96	Gerben Thijssen (BEL)	157
97	Taco van der Hoorn (NED)	155
98	Gijs Van Hoecke (BEL)	153

Israel–Premier Tech (IPT)
No.	Rider	Pos.
101	Derek Gee (CAN)	4
102	Simon Clarke (AUS)	117
103	Marco Frigo (ITA)	28
104	Jakob Fuglsang (DEN)	81
105	Jan Hirt (CZE)	DNS-7
106	Hugo Houle (CAN)	62
107	Nick Schultz (AUS)	106
109	Corbin Strong (NZL)	96

(United States) Lidl–Trek (LTK)
No.	Rider	Pos.
111	Giulio Ciccone (ITA)	DNS-15
112	Daan Hoole (NED)	119
113	Patrick Konrad (AUT)	73
114	Søren Kragh Andersen (DEN)	DNS-5
115	Jacopo Mosca (ITA)	126
116	Mads Pedersen (DEN)	90
117	Mathias Vacek (CZE)	57
118	Carlos Verona (ESP)	54

(Spain) Movistar Team (MOV)
No.	Rider	Pos.
121	Nairo Quintana (COL)	25
122	Orluis Aular (VEN)	101
123	Jon Barrenetxea (ESP)	92
124	Jefferson Alveiro Cepeda (ECU)	34
125	Davide Formolo (ITA)	45
126	Lorenzo Milesi (ITA)	88
127	Einer Rubio (COL)	8
128	Albert Torres (ESP)	127

(Switzerland) Q36.5 Pro Cycling Team (Q36)
No.	Rider	Pos.
131	Tom Pidcock (GBR)	16
132	Xabier Azparren (ESP)	125
133	Mark Donovan (GBR)	55
134	Damien Howson (AUS)	46
135	Emīls Liepiņš (LAT)	131
136	Matteo Moschetti (ITA)	152
137	Milan Vader (NED)	80
138	Nickolas Zukowsky (CAN)	DNF-4

(Belgium) Soudal–Quick-Step (SOQ)
No.	Rider	Pos.
141	Mikel Landa (ESP)	DNF-1
142	Mattia Cattaneo (ITA)	44
143	Josef Černý (CZE)	132
144	Gianmarco Garofoli (ITA)	31
145	Ethan Hayter (GBR)	136
146	James Knox (GBR)	19
147	Luke Lamperti (USA)	146
148	Paul Magnier (FRA)	DNS-16

(Australia) Team Jayco–AlUla (JAY)
No.	Rider	Pos.
151	Chris Harper (AUS)	23
152	Koen Bouwman (NED)	DNS-9
153	Davide De Pretto (ITA)	77
154	Paul Double (GBR)	98
155	Felix Engelhardt (GER)	82
156	Michael Hepburn (AUS)	143
157	Luke Plapp (AUS)	DNF-17
158	Filippo Zana (ITA)	58

(Netherlands) Team Picnic–PostNL (TPP)
No.	Rider	Pos.
161	Romain Bardet (FRA)	26
162	Alex Edmondson (AUS)	148
163	Chris Hamilton (AUS)	47
164	Gijs Leemreize (NED)	43
165	Niklas Märkl (GER)	156
166	Max Poole (GBR)	11
167	Casper van Uden (NED)	150
168	Bram Welten (NED)	DNF-7

(Italy) Team Polti VisitMalta (PTV)
No.	Rider	Pos.
171	Davide Piganzoli (ITA)	14
172	Davide Bais (ITA)	97
173	Mattia Bais (ITA)	69
174	Giovanni Lonardi (ITA)	129
175	Mirco Maestri (ITA)	93
176	Francisco Muñoz (ESP)	144
177	Andrea Pietrobon (ITA)	141
178	Alessandro Tonelli (ITA)	48

(Netherlands) Visma–Lease a Bike (TVL)
No.	Rider	Pos.
181	Wout van Aert (BEL)	72
182	Edoardo Affini (ITA)	133
183	Wilco Kelderman (NED)	37
184	Olav Kooij (NED)	149
185	Steven Kruijswijk (NED)	38
186	Bart Lemmen (NED)	42
187	Dylan van Baarle (NED)	95
188	Simon Yates (GBR)	1

(Switzerland) Tudor Pro Cycling Team (TUD)
No.	Rider	Pos.
191	Michael Storer (AUS)	10
192	Marco Brenner (GER)	DNF-19
193	Alexander Krieger (GER)	159
194	Rick Pluimers (NED)	105
195	Florian Stork (GER)	20
196	Yannis Voisard (SUI)	32
197	Larry Warbasse (USA)	68
198	Maikel Zijlaard (NED)	154

(United Arab Emirates) UAE Team Emirates XRG (UAD)
No.	Rider	Pos.
201	Juan Ayuso (ESP)	DNF-18
202	Igor Arrieta (ESP)	36
203	Filippo Baroncini (ITA)	78
204	Isaac del Toro (MEX)	2
205	Rafał Majka (POL)	13
206	Brandon McNulty (USA)	9
207	Jay Vine (AUS)	DNF-17
208	Adam Yates (GBR)	12

(Italy) VF Group–Bardiani–CSF–Faizanè (VBF)
No.	Rider	Pos.
211	Filippo Fiorelli (ITA)	89
212	Luca Covili (ITA)	70
213	Filippo Magli (ITA)	116
214	Martin Marcellusi (ITA)	75
215	Alessio Martinelli (ITA)	DNF-16
216	Alessandro Pinarello (ITA)	DNS-6
217	Manuele Tarozzi (ITA)	91
218	Enrico Zanoncello (ITA)	151

(Kazakhstan) XDS Astana Team (XAT)
No.	Rider	Pos.
221	Diego Ulissi (ITA)	21
222	Nicola Conci (ITA)	56
223	Lorenzo Fortunato (ITA)	24
224	Max Kanter (GER)	123
225	Anton Kuzmin (KAZ)	147
226	Fausto Masnada (ITA)	41
227	Wout Poels (NED)	50
228	Christian Scaroni (ITA)	40

=== By nationality ===
Country	No. of riders	In competition	Stage wins
Australia	14	11	3 (Kaden Groves, Chris Harper, Luke Plapp)
Austria	1	1	
Belgium	13	12	1 (Wout van Aert)
Canada	3	2	
Colombia	5	4	
Croatia	1	1	
Czechia	3	2	
Denmark	5	4	5 (Kasper Asgreen, Mads Pedersen x4)
Ecuador	3	3	1 (Richard Carapaz)
France	13	11	1 (Nicolas Prodhomme)
Germany	10	8	1 (Nico Denz)
Great Britain	12	11	1 (Joshua Tarling)
Ireland	2	2	
Italy	48	44	1 (Christian Scaroni)
Kazakhstan	1	1	
Latvia	1	1	
Luxembourg	2	1	
Mexico	1	1	1 (Isaac del Toro)
Netherlands	17	15	4 (Daan Hoole, Olav Kooij x2, Casper van Uden)
New Zealand	2	1	
Norway	4	4	
Poland	1	1	
Portugal	1	0	
Slovenia	3	2	
South Africa	1	1	
Spain	12	10	2 (Juan Ayuso, Carlos Verona)
Switzerland	1	1	
United States	3	3	
Venezuela	1	1	
Total	184	159	21
