= 2025 Giro d'Italia =

Cycling competition

2025 UCI World Tour, race 22 of 36
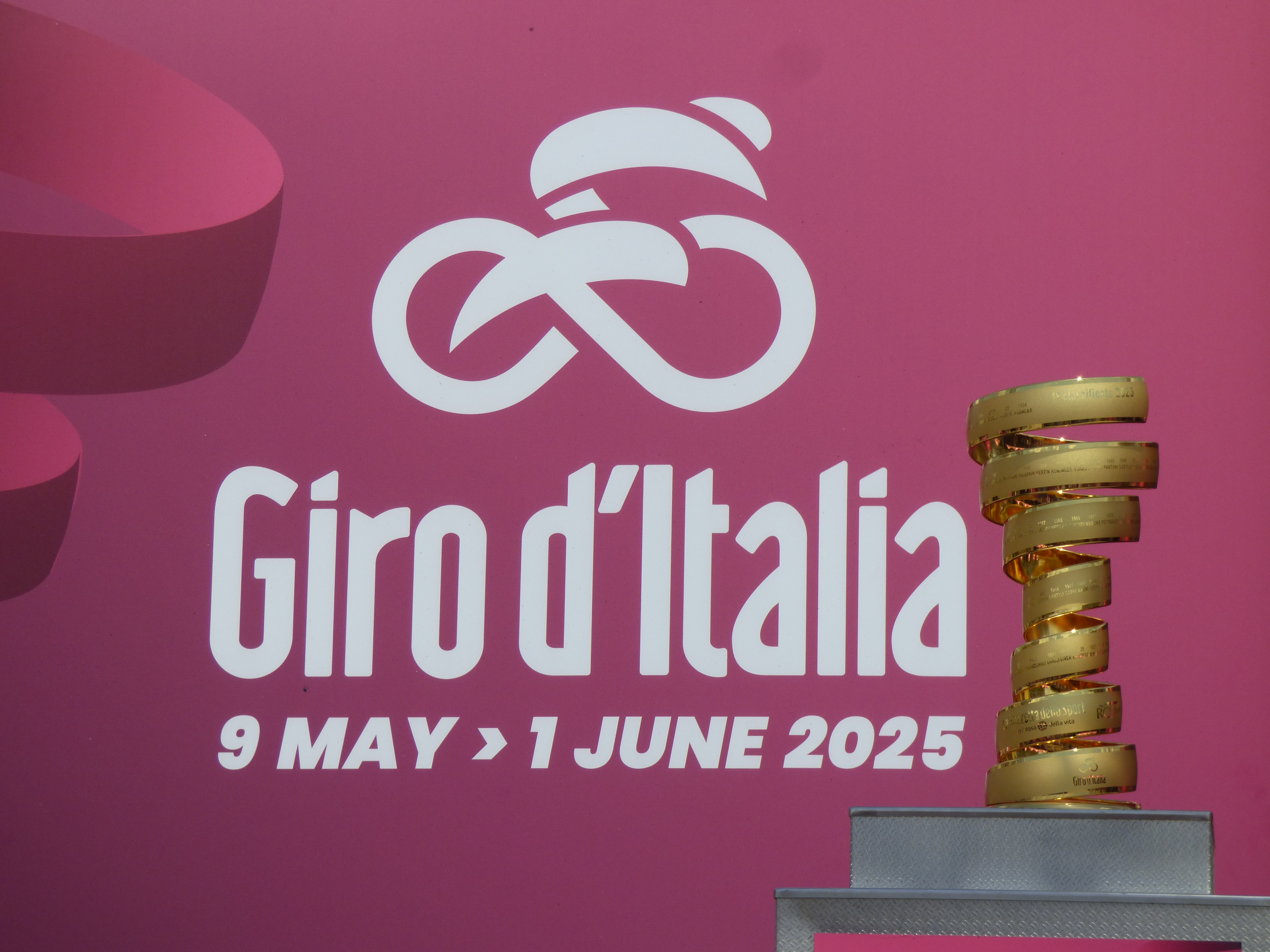
- The Trofeo Senza Fine in Ceglie Messapica, start of the 5th stage

Race details
- Dates: 9 May – 1 June 2025
- Stages: 21
- Distance: 3,443.3 km (2,139.6 mi)
- Winning time: 82h 31 '01"

Results
Jersey awarded to the overall winner	Winner	Simon Yates (GBR)	(Visma–Lease a Bike)
	Second	Isaac del Toro (MEX)	(UAE Team Emirates XRG)
	Third	Richard Carapaz (ECU)	(EF Education–EasyPost)
Jersey awarded to the points classification winner	Points	Mads Pedersen (DEN)	(Lidl–Trek)
Jersey awarded to the mountains classification winner	Mountains	Lorenzo Fortunato (ITA)	(XDS Astana Team)
Jersey awarded to the young rider classification winner	Young rider	Isaac del Toro (MEX)	(UAE Team Emirates XRG)
	Sprints	Dries De Bondt (BEL)	(Decathlon–AG2R La Mondiale)
Jersey awarded to the combativity classification winner	Combativity	Lorenzo Fortunato (ITA)	(XDS Astana Team)
	Team	(United Arab Emirates) UAE Team Emirates XRG	

The 2025 Giro d'Italia was the 108th edition of the Giro d'Italia, a three-week Grand Tour cycling stage race. The race started on 9 May in Durrës, Albania and finished on 1 June in Rome. There were two individual time trial stages and three stages longer than 200 km.

The general classification was won by the British rider Simon Yates of Team Visma–Lease a Bike, who completed the race in 82h 31' 01" at an average speed of 41.73 km/h (25.93 mph) for his first Giro victory. Yates claimed the leader's pink jersey for the first time on the penultimate stage by outdistancing the Mexican rider Isaac del Toro (UAE Team Emirates) on the Colle delle Finestre, after the latter had held the race lead since stage 9; del Toro retained second place in the general classification and won the young rider classification as well as the 17th stage. Ecuadorian rider Richard Carapaz (EF Education–EasyPost), a past Giro winner, placed third in the general classification.

Mads Pedersen (Lidl–Trek) won four stages and the points classification. Lorenzo Fortunato (XDS Astana Team) won the mountains classification as well as the overall combativity award.

== Teams ==
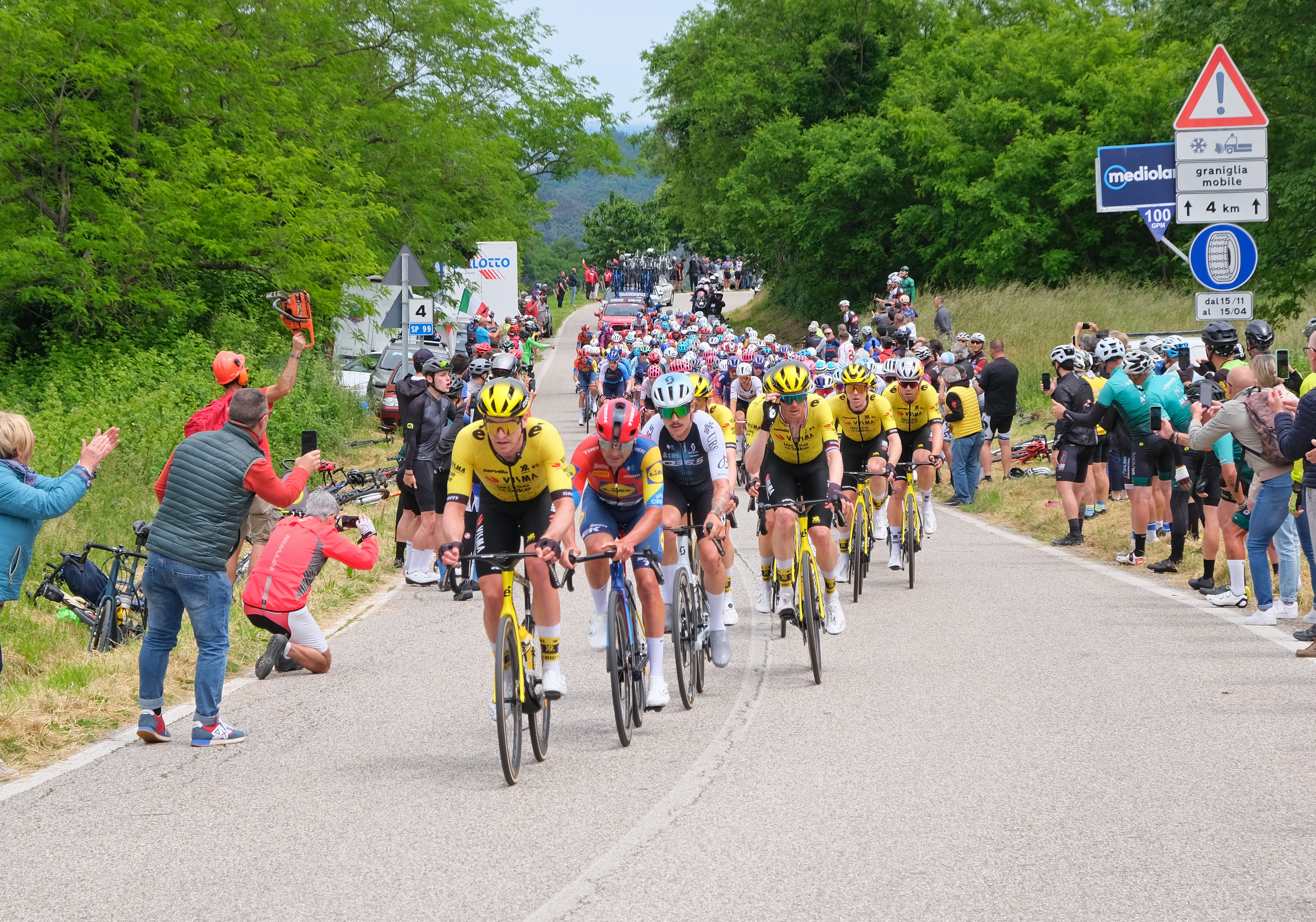
Peloton climbing Passo Roverello on stage 13.

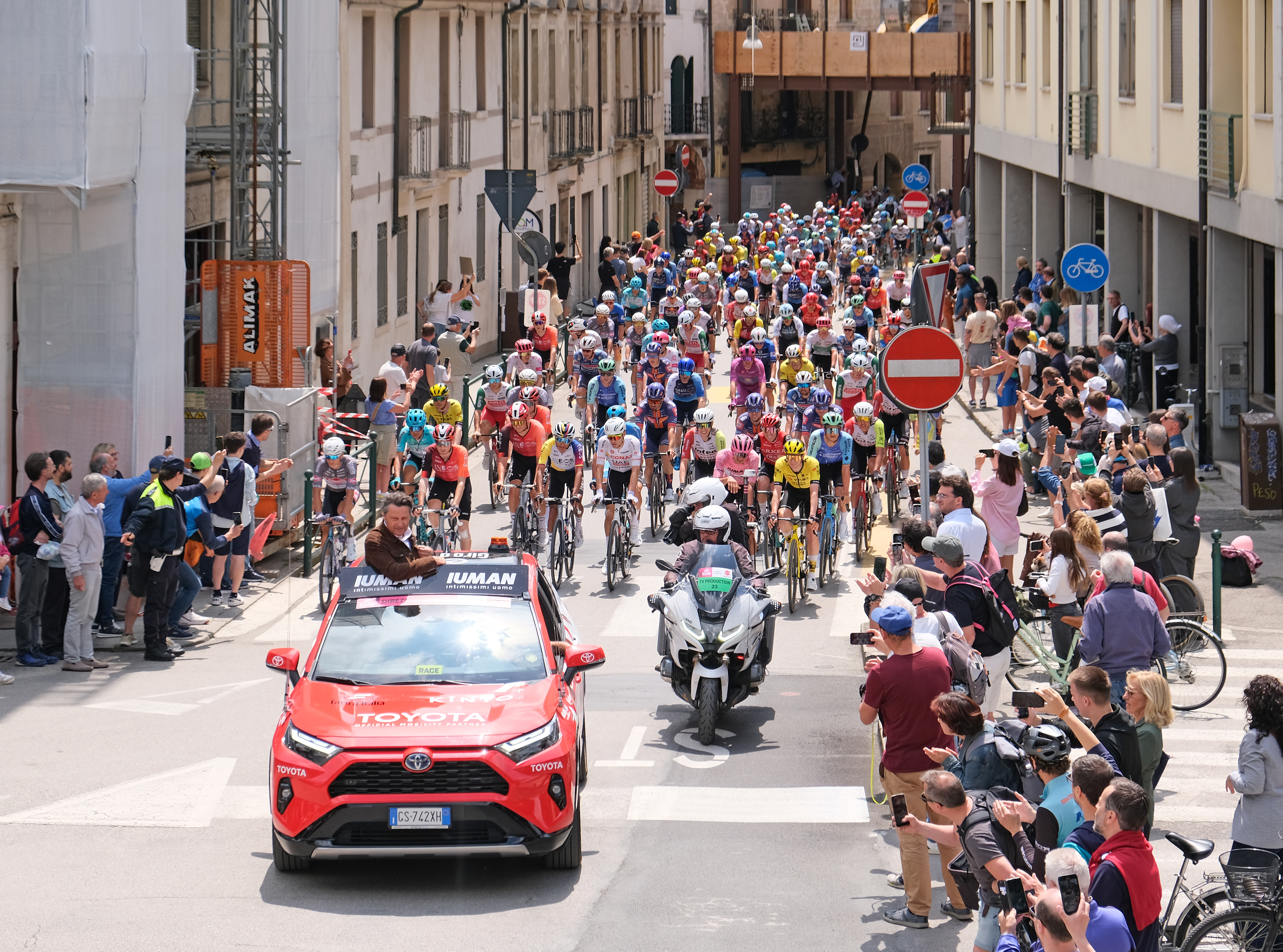
The start of stage 14 in Treviso

Twenty-three teams participated in the race. All 18 UCI WorldTeams were automatically invited. They were joined by five UCI ProTeams: one of the two highest ranked UCI ProTeams in 2024 (Israel–Premier Tech), along with four teams selected by RCS Sport, the organisers of the Tour.

Union Cycliste Internationale (UCI) rules allow twenty two teams to enter a Grand Tour – eighteen UCI WorldTeams, the two highest ranked UCI ProTeams from the previous season and two teams invited by the organisers. Grand Tour race organisers ASO and RCS Sport asked the UCI to allow an additional wildcard team to be invited to Grand Tour events, after lobbying from smaller teams competing for the wildcard slots. Larger teams were reported to not support the request, with Visma–Lease a Bike noting that an additional team would decrease safety. In March 2025, the UCI announced that twenty three teams would be permitted in 2025, allowing an additional ProTeam to be invited. RCS Sport announced the teams on 31 March 2025.

UCI WorldTeams

- Alpecin–Deceuninck
- Arkéa–B&B Hotels
- Cofidis
- Decathlon–AG2R La Mondiale
- EF Education–EasyPost
- Groupama–FDJ
- INEOS Grenadiers
- Intermarché–Wanty
- Lidl–Trek
- Movistar Team
- Red Bull–Bora–Hansgrohe
- Soudal–Quick-Step
- Team Bahrain Victorious
- Team Picnic–PostNL
- Team Jayco–AlUla
- UAE Team Emirates XRG
- Visma–Lease a Bike
- XDS Astana Team

UCI ProTeams

- Israel–Premier Tech
- Q36.5 Pro Cycling Team
- Team Polti VisitMalta
- Tudor Pro Cycling Team
- VF Group–Bardiani–CSF–Faizanè

== Pre-race favourites ==
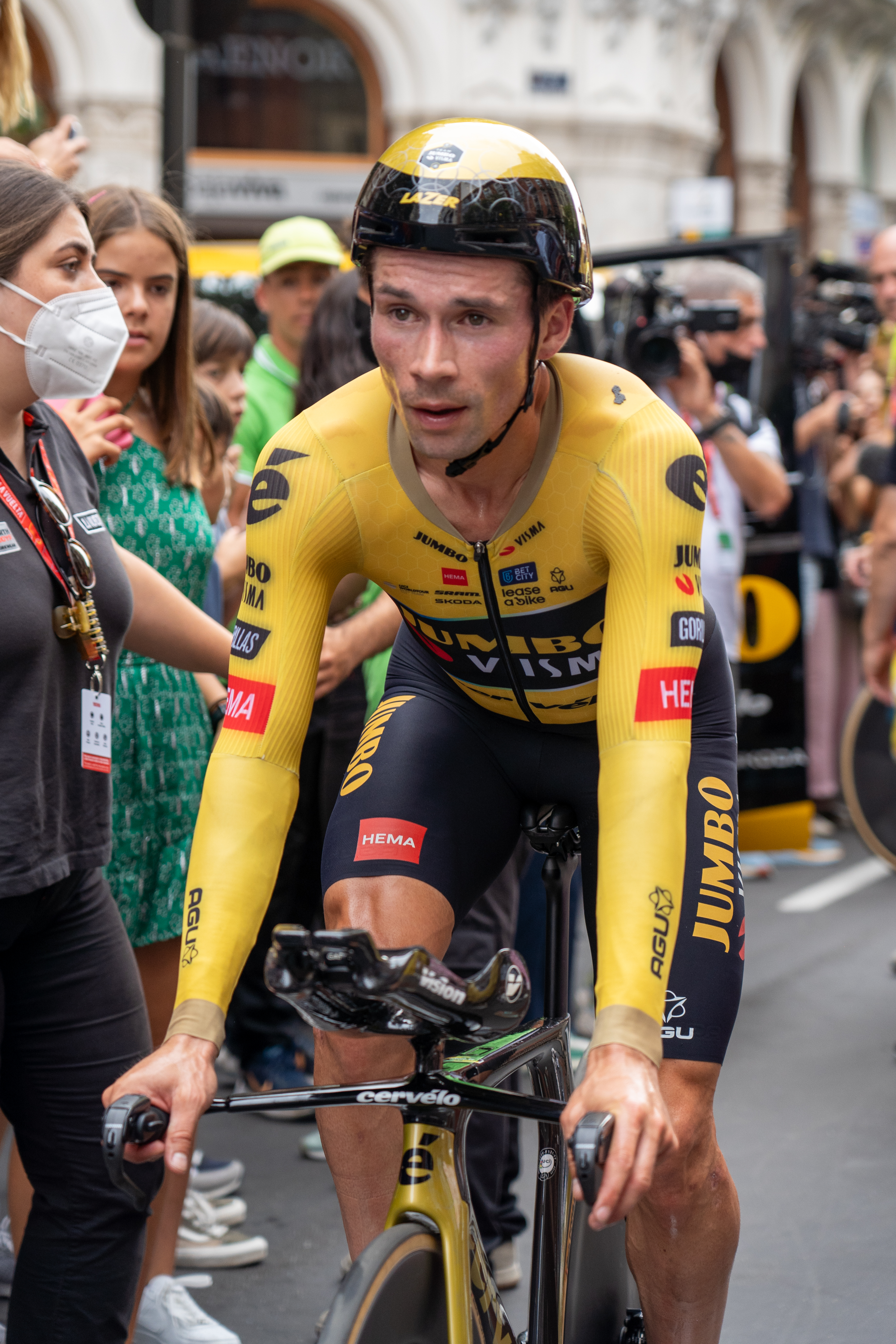
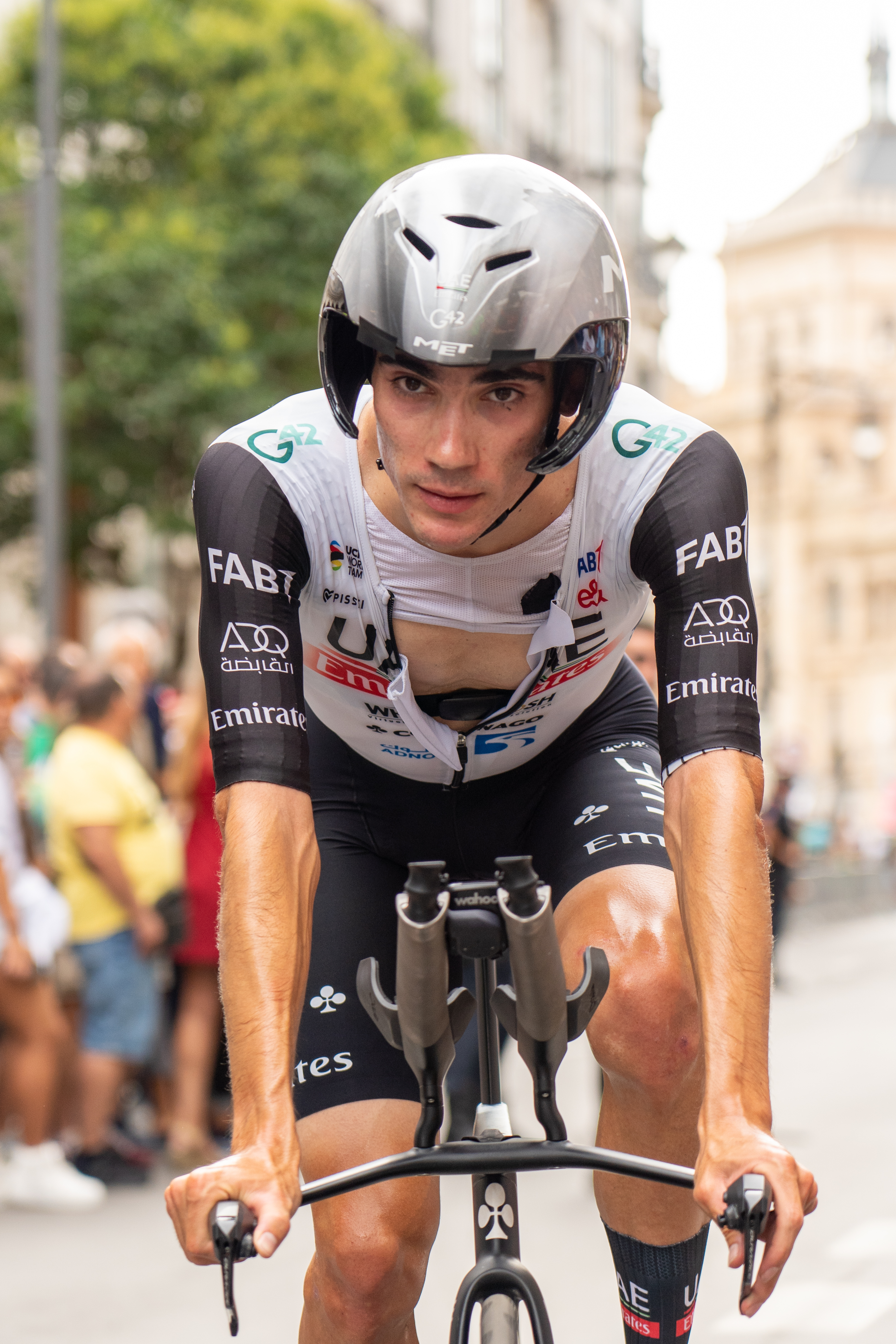
Primož Roglič (left) and Juan Ayuso (right) were widely considered the top favorites for the general classification. Roglic abandoned on stage 16 while Ayuso abandoned on stage 18.

In pre-race coverage from cycling analysts and publications, Slovenian Primož Roglič (Red Bull–Bora–Hansgrohe) and Spaniard Juan Ayuso (UAE Team Emirates XRG) were widely seen as the favorites for the general classification. Roglič, the 2023 Giro champion, was viewed as a top contender due to his extensive Grand Tour experience and strong team, which included former Giro winner Jai Hindley and 2024 runner-up Daniel Martínez. Roglič had also shown strong form in 2025, beating Ayuso at the Volta a Catalunya. Ayuso, making his Giro debut, was coming off a win at Tirreno–Adriatico. At 22 years old, Ayuso had already achieved significant Grand Tour results, with two top-four finishes in the Vuelta a España.

Other riders expected to compete for the podium were Adam Yates (UAE Team Emirates XRG), Ayuso's teammate and potential co-leader who finished third in the 2023 Tour de France. His twin brother Simon Yates (Visma–Lease a Bike), a former Vuelta champion, and Richard Carapaz (EF Education–EasyPost), Giro champion in 2019, were listed as contenders despite mixed prior results in 2025. Egan Bernal (INEOS Grenadiers), winner of both the Tour in 2019 and Giro in 2021, was seen as a significant challenger for the first time since his 2022 crash. Michael Storer (Tudor Pro Cycling Team) had entered into contention with a "dominant performance" at the Tour of the Alps, where he won a stage and the general classification. Other outsiders mentioned by multiple publications included Antonio Tiberi (Team Bahrain Victorious), Mikel Landa (Soudal–Quick-Step), Derek Gee (Israel–Premier Tech), Tom Pidcock (Q36.5 Pro Cycling Team), and Giulio Ciccone (Lidl–Trek).

For the points classification, the favorites included sprinters Kaden Groves (Alpecin–Deceuninck), Olav Kooij (Visma–Lease a Bike), and Sam Bennett (Decathlon–AG2R La Mondiale), as well as more versatile riders like Mads Pedersen (Lidl–Trek), Wout van Aert (Visma–Lease a Bike), and Paul Magnier (Soudal–Quick-Step). For the mountains classification, the general classification contenders were seen as most likely to win, alongside breakaway and climbing specialists like Christian Scaroni (XDS Astana Team), Georg Steinhauser (EF Education–EasyPost), and Lorenzo Fortunato (XDS Astana Team).

== Route and stages ==
In April 29 it was announced that the final stage that would start from the Vatican Gardens, Vatican City to celebrate the 2025 Jubilee and to pay homage to Pope Francis, who passed away on April 21. The stage's start was observed by Pope Leo XIV, who welcomed the cyclists to the final stage of the race.

Stage characteristics and winners
Stage	Date	Course	Distance	Type	Winner
1	9 May	Durrës (Albania) to Tirana (Albania)	160 km (99 mi)	Hilly stage	Mads Pedersen (DEN)
2	10 May	Tirana (Albania) to Tirana (Albania)	13.7 km (8.5 mi)	Individual time trial	Josh Tarling (GBR)
3	11 May	Vlorë (Albania) to Vlorë (Albania)	160 km (99 mi)	Hilly stage	Mads Pedersen (DEN)
	12 May	Rest day			
4	13 May	Alberobello to Lecce	189 km (117 mi)	Flat stage	Casper van Uden (NED)
5	14 May	Ceglie Messapica to Matera	151 km (94 mi)	Hilly stage	Mads Pedersen (DEN)
6	15 May	Potenza to Naples	227 km (141 mi)	Hilly stage	Kaden Groves (AUS)
7	16 May	Castel di Sangro to Tagliacozzo	168 km (104 mi)	Mountain stage	Juan Ayuso (ESP)
8	17 May	Giulianova to Castelraimondo	197 km (122 mi)	Hilly stage	Luke Plapp (AUS)
9	18 May	Gubbio to Siena	181 km (112 mi)	Hilly stage	Wout van Aert (BEL)
	19 May	Rest day			
10	20 May	Lucca to Pisa	28.6 km (17.8 mi)	Individual time trial	Daan Hoole (NED)
11	21 May	Viareggio to Castelnovo ne' Monti	186 km (116 mi)	Mountain stage	Richard Carapaz (ECU)
12	22 May	Modena to Viadana	172 km (107 mi)	Flat stage	Olav Kooij (NED)
13	23 May	Rovigo to Vicenza	180 km (110 mi)	Hilly stage	Mads Pedersen (DEN)
14	24 May	Treviso to Nova Gorica (Slovenia)	195 km (121 mi)	Flat stage	Kasper Asgreen (DEN)
15	25 May	Fiume Veneto to Asiago	219 km (136 mi)	Mountain stage	Carlos Verona (ESP)
	26 May	Rest day			
16	27 May	Piazzola sul Brenta to San Valentino	203 km (126 mi)	Mountain stage	Christian Scaroni (ITA)
17	28 May	San Michele all'Adige to Bormio	155 km (96 mi)	Mountain stage	Isaac del Toro (MEX)
18	29 May	Morbegno to Cesano Maderno	144 km (89 mi)	Hilly stage	Nico Denz (GER)
19	30 May	Biella to Champoluc	166 km (103 mi)	Mountain stage	Nicolas Prodhomme (FRA)
20	31 May	Verrès to Sestriere	205 km (127 mi)	Mountain stage	Chris Harper (AUS)
21	1 June	Vatican Gardens (Vatican City) to Rome	143 km (89 mi)	Flat stage	Olav Kooij (NED)
Total			3,443.3 km (2,139.6 mi)		

== Classification leadership ==
Classification leadership by stage
Stage	Winner	General classification	Points classification	Mountains classification	Young rider classification	General Super Team	Intermediate sprint classification	Combativity award	Breakaway classification	Red Bull KM classification
1	Mads Pedersen	Mads Pedersen	Mads Pedersen (Note: On stage 2, Wout van Aert, who was second in the points classification, wore the cyclamen jersey, because first-placed Mads Pedersen wore the pink jersey as the leader of the general classification. On stage 4, Alessandro Tonelli wore the cyclamen jersey for the same reason. On stages 5–7, Olav Kooij wore the cyclamen jersey for the same reason.)	Sylvain Moniquet	Francesco Busatto	Lidl–Trek	Manuele Tarozzi	Alessandro Tonelli	Alessandro Verre	Manuele Tarozzi
2	Joshua Tarling	Primož Roglič	Mads Pedersen	Sylvain Moniquet	Mathias Vacek	Lidl–Trek	Manuele Tarozzi	not awarded	Alessandro Verre	Manuele Tarozzi
3	Mads Pedersen	Mads Pedersen	Mads Pedersen	Lorenzo Fortunato	Mathias Vacek	Lidl–Trek	Alessandro Tonelli	Alessandro Tonelli	Alessandro Tonelli	Dries De Bondt
4	Casper van Uden	Mads Pedersen	Mads Pedersen	Lorenzo Fortunato	Mathias Vacek	Lidl–Trek	Alessandro Tonelli	Francisco Muñoz	Alessandro Tonelli	Manuele Tarozzi
5	Mads Pedersen	Mads Pedersen	Mads Pedersen	Lorenzo Fortunato	Mathias Vacek	Lidl–Trek	Alessandro Tonelli	Davide Bais	Alessandro Tonelli	Manuele Tarozzi
6	Kaden Groves	Mads Pedersen	Mads Pedersen	Lorenzo Fortunato	Mathias Vacek	Lidl–Trek	Alessandro Tonelli	not awarded	Alessandro Tonelli	Manuele Tarozzi
7	Juan Ayuso	Primož Roglič	Mads Pedersen	Lorenzo Fortunato	Juan Ayuso	UAE Team Emirates XRG	Alessandro Tonelli	Alessandro Tonelli	Alessandro Tonelli	Manuele Tarozzi
8	Luke Plapp	Diego Ulissi	Mads Pedersen	Lorenzo Fortunato	Juan Ayuso	UAE Team Emirates XRG	Alessandro Tonelli	Lorenzo Fortunato	Alessandro Tonelli	Manuele Tarozzi
9	Wout van Aert	Isaac del Toro	Mads Pedersen	Lorenzo Fortunato	Isaac del Toro (Note: On stages 10–16, Juan Ayuso, who was second in the young rider classification, wore the white jersey, because first-placed Isaac del Toro wore the pink jersey as the leader of the general classification. On stage 17, Antonio Tiberi wore the white jersey for the same reason. On stages 18–20, Giulio Pellizzari wore the white jersey for the same reason.)	UAE Team Emirates XRG	Alessandro Tonelli	Quinten Hermans	Alessandro Tonelli	Manuele Tarozzi
10	Daan Hoole	Isaac del Toro	Mads Pedersen	Lorenzo Fortunato	Isaac del Toro	UAE Team Emirates XRG	Alessandro Tonelli	not awarded	Alessandro Tonelli	Manuele Tarozzi
11	Richard Carapaz	Isaac del Toro	Mads Pedersen	Lorenzo Fortunato	Isaac del Toro	UAE Team Emirates XRG	Alessandro Tonelli	Nairo Quintana	Alessandro Tonelli	Manuele Tarozzi
12	Olav Kooij	Isaac del Toro	Mads Pedersen	Lorenzo Fortunato	Isaac del Toro	UAE Team Emirates XRG	Alessandro Tonelli	Andrea Pietrobon	Manuele Tarozzi	Manuele Tarozzi
13	Mads Pedersen	Isaac del Toro	Mads Pedersen	Lorenzo Fortunato	Isaac del Toro	UAE Team Emirates XRG	Alessandro Tonelli	Lorenzo Germani	Manuele Tarozzi	Isaac del Toro
14	Kasper Asgreen	Isaac del Toro	Mads Pedersen	Lorenzo Fortunato	Isaac del Toro	UAE Team Emirates XRG	Alessandro Tonelli	Kasper Asgreen	Manuele Tarozzi	Isaac del Toro
15	Carlos Verona	Isaac del Toro	Mads Pedersen	Lorenzo Fortunato	Isaac del Toro	UAE Team Emirates XRG	Alessandro Tonelli	Marco Frigo	Manuele Tarozzi	Isaac del Toro
16	Christian Scaroni	Isaac del Toro	Mads Pedersen	Lorenzo Fortunato	Isaac del Toro	UAE Team Emirates XRG	Alessandro Tonelli	Lorenzo Fortunato	Manuele Tarozzi	Isaac del Toro
17	Isaac del Toro	Isaac del Toro	Mads Pedersen	Lorenzo Fortunato	Isaac del Toro	UAE Team Emirates XRG	Dries De Bondt	Lorenzo Fortunato	Manuele Tarozzi	Isaac del Toro
18	Nico Denz	Isaac del Toro	Mads Pedersen	Lorenzo Fortunato	Isaac del Toro	UAE Team Emirates XRG	Dries De Bondt	Wout van Aert	Manuele Tarozzi	Manuele Tarozzi
19	Nicolas Prodhomme	Isaac del Toro	Mads Pedersen	Lorenzo Fortunato	Isaac del Toro	UAE Team Emirates XRG	Mads Pedersen	Nicolas Prodhomme	Manuele Tarozzi	Manuele Tarozzi
20	Chris Harper	Simon Yates	Mads Pedersen	Lorenzo Fortunato	Isaac del Toro	UAE Team Emirates XRG	Dries De Bondt	Chris Harper	Manuele Tarozzi	Manuele Tarozzi
21	Olav Kooij	Simon Yates	Mads Pedersen	Lorenzo Fortunato	Isaac del Toro	UAE Team Emirates XRG	Dries De Bondt	Martin Marcellusi	Manuele Tarozzi	Manuele Tarozzi
Final		Simon Yates	Mads Pedersen	Lorenzo Fortunato	Isaac del Toro	UAE Team Emirates XRG	Dries De Bondt	Lorenzo Fortunato	Manuele Tarozzi	Manuele Tarozzi

== Classification standings ==
Legend
Denotes the winner of the general classification	Denotes the winner of the mountains classification
Denotes the winner of the points classification	Denotes the winner of the young rider classification
Denotes the winner of the combativity award	

=== General classification ===
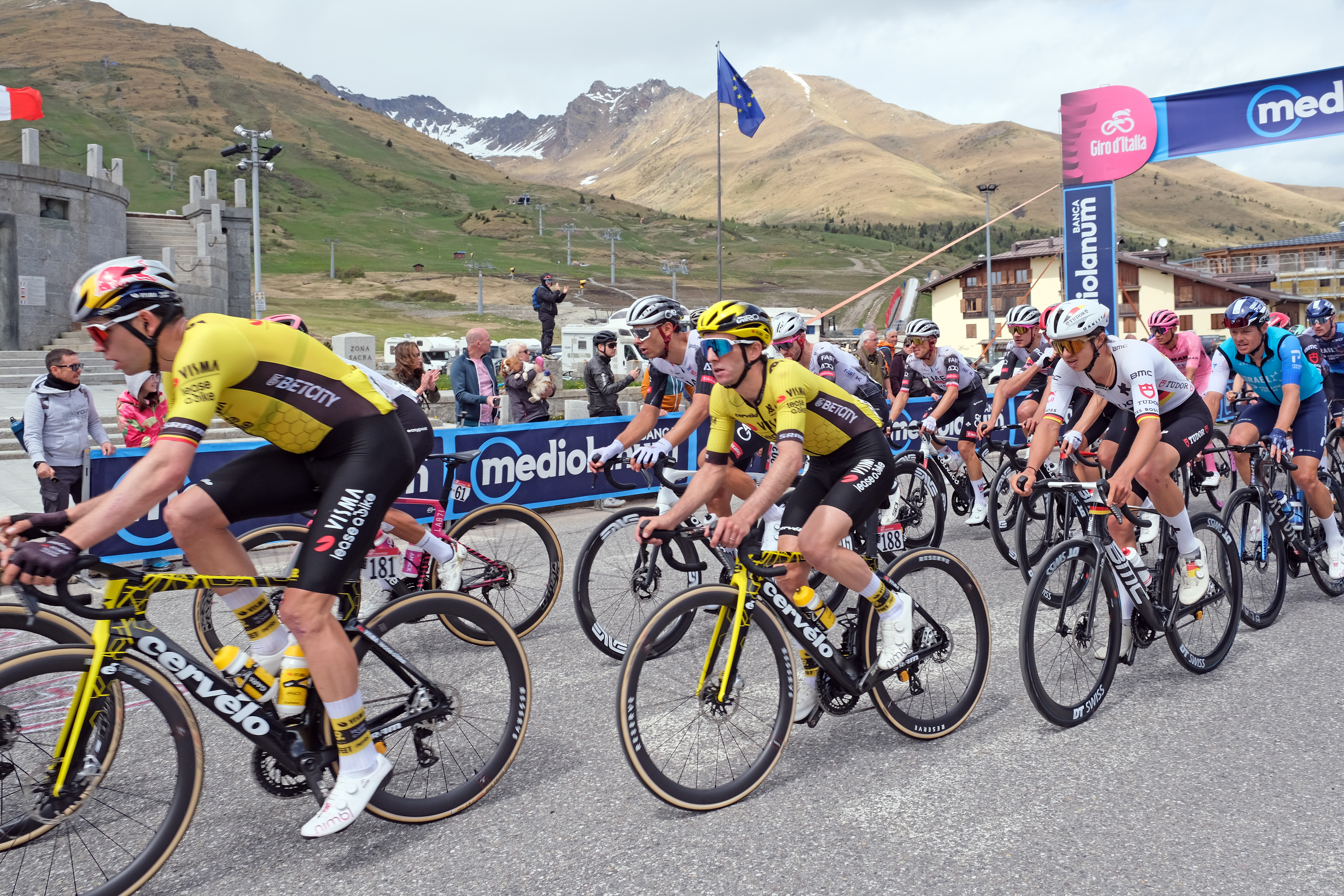
General classification winner Simon Yates on top of Tonale Pass on stage 17

Final general classification (1–10)
Rank	Rider	Team	Time
1	Simon Yates (GBR)	Visma–Lease a Bike	82h 31' 01"
2	Isaac del Toro (MEX)	UAE Team Emirates XRG	+ 3' 56"
3	Richard Carapaz (ECU)	EF Education–EasyPost	+ 4' 43"
4	Derek Gee (CAN)	Israel–Premier Tech	+ 6' 23"
5	Damiano Caruso (ITA)	Team Bahrain Victorious	+ 7' 32"
6	Giulio Pellizzari (ITA)	Red Bull–Bora–Hansgrohe	+ 9' 28"
7	Egan Bernal (COL)	INEOS Grenadiers	+ 12' 42"
8	Einer Rubio (COL)	Movistar Team	+ 13' 05"
9	Brandon McNulty (USA)	UAE Team Emirates XRG	+ 13' 36"
10	Michael Storer (AUS)	Tudor Pro Cycling Team	+ 14' 27"

Final general classification (11–159)
Rank	Rider	Team	Time
11	Max Poole (GBR)	Team Picnic–PostNL	+ 18' 15"
12	Adam Yates (GBR)	UAE Team Emirates XRG	+ 21' 43"
13	Rafał Majka (POL)	UAE Team Emirates XRG	+ 23' 46"
14	Davide Piganzoli (ITA)	Team Polti VisitMalta	+ 27' 53"
15	Nicolas Prodhomme (FRA)	Decathlon–AG2R La Mondiale	+ 36' 09"
16	Tom Pidcock (GBR)	Q36.5 Pro Cycling Team	+ 44' 41"
17	Antonio Tiberi (ITA)	Team Bahrain Victorious	+ 46' 04"
18	Louis Meintjes (RSA)	Intermarché–Wanty	+ 52' 03"
19	James Knox (GBR)	Soudal–Quick-Step	+ 56' 53"
20	Florian Stork (GER)	Tudor Pro Cycling Team	+ 58' 53"
21	Diego Ulissi (ITA)	XDS Astana Team	+ 1h 05' 07"
22	Embret Svestad-Bårdseng (NOR)	Arkéa–B&B Hotels	+ 1h 06' 40"
23	Chris Harper (AUS)	Team Jayco–AlUla	+ 1h 13' 35"
24	Lorenzo Fortunato (ITA)	XDS Astana Team	+ 1h 22' 09"
25	Nairo Quintana (COL)	Movistar Team	+ 1h 23' 09"
26	Romain Bardet (FRA)	Team Picnic–PostNL	+ 1h 24' 04"
27	Edoardo Zambanini (ITA)	Team Bahrain Victorious	+ 1h 25' 59"
28	Marco Frigo (ITA)	Israel–Premier Tech	+ 1h 32' 20"
29	Thymen Arensman (NED)	INEOS Grenadiers	+ 1h 37' 46"
30	Pello Bilbao (ESP)	Team Bahrain Victorious	+ 1h 52' 02"
31	Gianmarco Garofoli (ITA)	Soudal–Quick-Step	+ 1h 53' 53"
32	Yannis Voisard (SUI)	Tudor Pro Cycling Team	+ 1h 56' 21"
33	Kevin Geniets (LUX)	Groupama–FDJ	+ 1h 56' 33"
34	Jefferson Alveiro Cepeda (ECU)	Movistar Team	+ 1h 57' 52"
35	Andrea Vendrame (ITA)	Decathlon–AG2R La Mondiale	+ 1h 59' 53"
36	Igor Arrieta (ESP)	UAE Team Emirates XRG	+ 2h 00' 15"
37	Wilco Kelderman (NED)	Visma–Lease a Bike	+ 2h 01' 00"
38	Steven Kruijswijk (NED)	Visma–Lease a Bike	+ 2h 05' 13"
39	Rémy Rochas (FRA)	Groupama–FDJ	+ 2h 11' 04"
40	Christian Scaroni (ITA)	XDS Astana Team	+ 2h 11' 13"
41	Fausto Masnada (ITA)	XDS Astana Team	+ 2h 12' 40"
42	Bart Lemmen (NED)	Visma–Lease a Bike	+ 2h 20' 47"
43	Gijs Leemreize (NED)	Team Picnic–PostNL	+ 2h 21' 52"
44	Mattia Cattaneo (ITA)	Soudal–Quick-Step	+ 2h 23' 20"
45	Davide Formolo (ITA)	Movistar Team	+ 2h 23' 27"
46	Damien Howson (AUS)	Q36.5 Pro Cycling Team	+ 2h 23' 30"
47	Chris Hamilton (AUS)	Team Picnic–PostNL	+ 2h 23' 31"
48	Alessandro Tonelli (ITA)	Team Polti VisitMalta	+ 2h 23' 48"
49	Martin Tjøtta (NOR)	Arkéa–B&B Hotels	+ 2h 26' 05"
50	Wouter Poels (NED)	XDS Astana Team	+ 2h 26' 25"
51	Jefferson Alexander Cepeda (ECU)	EF Education–EasyPost	+ 2h 27' 01"
52	Sergio Samitier (ESP)	Cofidis	+ 2h 28' 09"
53	Daniel Martínez (COL)	Red Bull–Bora–Hansgrohe	+ 2h 29' 40"
54	Carlos Verona (ESP)	Lidl–Trek	+ 2h 31' 09"
55	Mark Donovan (GBR)	Q36.5 Pro Cycling Team	+ 2h 37' 39"
56	Nicola Conci (ITA)	XDS Astana Team	+ 2h 40' 14"
57	Mathias Vacek (CZE)	Lidl–Trek	+ 2h 42' 59"
58	Filippo Zana (ITA)	Team Jayco–AlUla	+ 2h 43' 24"
59	Giovanni Aleotti (ITA)	Red Bull–Bora–Hansgrohe	+ 2h 44' 16"
60	Simone Petilli (ITA)	Intermarché–Wanty	+ 2h 46' 21"
61	Jonathan Castroviejo (ESP)	INEOS Grenadiers	+ 2h 47' 31"
62	Hugo Houle (CAN)	Israel–Premier Tech	+ 2h 53' 29"
63	Lorenzo Germani (ITA)	Groupama–FDJ	+ 2h 54' 25"
64	Quentin Pacher (FRA)	Groupama–FDJ	+ 2h 59' 12"
65	Jonathan Lastra (ESP)	Cofidis	+ 3h 04' 36"
66	David Gaudu (FRA)	Groupama–FDJ	+ 3h 06' 33"
67	Stefano Oldani (ITA)	Cofidis	+ 3h 07' 43"
68	Lawrence Warbasse (USA)	Tudor Pro Cycling Team	+ 3h 10' 00"
69	Mattia Bais (ITA)	Team Polti VisitMalta	+ 3h 11' 07"
70	Luca Covili (ITA)	VF Group–Bardiani–CSF–Faizanè	+ 3h 11' 24"
71	Sylvain Moniquet (BEL)	Cofidis	+ 3h 15' 48"
72	Wout van Aert (BEL)	Visma–Lease a Bike	+ 3h 16' 27"
73	Patrick Konrad (AUT)	Lidl–Trek	+ 3h 17' 41"
74	Georg Steinhauser (GER)	EF Education–EasyPost	+ 3h 22' 54"
75	Martin Marcellusi (ITA)	VF Group–Bardiani–CSF–Faizanè	+ 3h 23' 11"
76	James Shaw (GBR)	EF Education–EasyPost	+ 3h 26' 18"
77	Davide De Pretto (ITA)	Team Jayco–AlUla	+ 3h 28' 54"
78	Filippo Baroncini (ITA)	UAE Team Emirates XRG	+ 3h 30' 26"
79	Mikkel Frølich Honoré (DEN)	EF Education–EasyPost	+ 3h 34' 22"
80	Milan Vader (NED)	Q36.5 Pro Cycling Team	+ 3h 34' 38"
81	Jakob Fuglsang (DEN)	Israel–Premier Tech	+ 3h 36' 09"
82	Felix Engelhardt (GER)	Team Jayco–AlUla	+ 3h 37' 17"
83	Jan Tratnik (SLO)	Red Bull–Bora–Hansgrohe	+ 3h 39' 12"
84	Dorian Godon (FRA)	Decathlon–AG2R La Mondiale	+ 3h 40' 14"
85	Quinten Hermans (BEL)	Alpecin–Deceuninck	+ 3h 43' 42"
86	Timo Kielich (BEL)	Alpecin–Deceuninck	+ 3h 49' 45"
87	Darren Rafferty (IRL)	EF Education–EasyPost	+ 3h 51' 51"
88	Lorenzo Milesi (ITA)	Movistar Team	+ 3h 54' 04"
89	Filippo Fiorelli (ITA)	VF Group–Bardiani–CSF–Faizanè	+ 4h 00' 39"
90	Mads Pedersen (DEN)	Lidl–Trek	+ 4h 00' 39"
91	Manuele Tarozzi (ITA)	VF Group–Bardiani–CSF–Faizanè	+ 4h 01' 33"
92	Jon Barrenetxea (ESP)	Movistar Team	+ 4h 02' 34"
93	Mirco Maestri (ITA)	Team Polti VisitMalta	+ 4h 02' 46"
94	Simon Guglielmi (FRA)	Arkéa–B&B Hotels	+ 4h 03' 10"
95	Dylan van Baarle (NED)	Visma–Lease a Bike	+ 4h 07' 14"
96	Corbin Strong (NZL)	Israel–Premier Tech	+ 4h 07' 26"
97	Davide Bais (ITA)	Team Polti VisitMalta	+ 4h 16' 09"
98	Paul Double (GBR)	Team Jayco–AlUla	+ 4h 16' 30"
99	Francesco Busatto (ITA)	Intermarché–Wanty	+ 4h 17' 40"
100	Fabio Van den Bossche (BEL)	Alpecin–Deceuninck	+ 4h 18' 23"
101	Orluis Aular (VEN)	Movistar Team	+ 4h 22' 20"
102	Edward Planckaert (BEL)	Alpecin–Deceuninck	+ 4h 22' 44"
103	Lucas Hamilton (AUS)	INEOS Grenadiers	+ 4h 24' 28"
104	Alessandro Verre (ITA)	Arkéa–B&B Hotels	+ 4h 26' 38"
105	Rick Pluimers (NED)	Tudor Pro Cycling Team	+ 4h 30' 38"
106	Nick Schultz (AUS)	Israel–Premier Tech	+ 4h 31' 19"
107	Kaden Groves (AUS)	Alpecin–Deceuninck	+ 4h 31' 34"
108	Kevin Colleoni (ITA)	Intermarché–Wanty	+ 4h 33' 00"
109	Laurens Huys (BEL)	Arkéa–B&B Hotels	+ 4h 36' 42"
110	Owain Doull (GBR)	EF Education–EasyPost	+ 4h 37' 02"
111	Stan Dewulf (BEL)	Decathlon–AG2R La Mondiale	+ 4h 40' 33"
112	Enzo Paleni (FRA)	Groupama–FDJ	+ 4h 42' 51"
113	Fran Miholjević (CRO)	Team Bahrain Victorious	+ 4h 46' 16"
114	Kim Heiduk (GER)	INEOS Grenadiers	+ 4h 46' 33"
115	Kasper Asgreen (DEN)	EF Education–EasyPost	+ 4h 47' 04"
116	Filippo Magli (ITA)	VF Group–Bardiani–CSF–Faizanè	+ 4h 48' 45"
117	Simon Clarke (AUS)	Israel–Premier Tech	+ 4h 48' 51"
118	Jimmy Janssens (BEL)	Alpecin–Deceuninck	+ 4h 55' 09"
119	Daan Hoole (NED)	Lidl–Trek	+ 4h 57' 19"
120	Ben Turner (GBR)	INEOS Grenadiers	+ 5h 03' 49"
121	Gianni Moscon (ITA)	Red Bull–Bora–Hansgrohe	+ 5h 05' 00"
122	Nico Denz (GER)	Red Bull–Bora–Hansgrohe	+ 5h 05' 18"
123	Max Kanter (GER)	XDS Astana Team	+ 5h 05' 26"
124	Anthony Perez (FRA)	Cofidis	+ 5h 08' 15"
125	Xabier Azparren (ESP)	Q36.5 Pro Cycling Team	+ 5h 09' 49"
126	Jacopo Mosca (ITA)	Lidl–Trek	+ 5h 09' 58"
127	Albert Torres (ESP)	Movistar Team	+ 5h 11' 13"
128	Dries De Bondt (BEL)	Decathlon–AG2R La Mondiale	+ 5h 13' 22"
129	Giovanni Lonardi (ITA)	Team Polti VisitMalta	+ 5h 20' 03"
130	Sven Erik Bystrøm (NOR)	Groupama–FDJ	+ 5h 23' 13"
131	Emīls Liepiņš (LAT)	Q36.5 Pro Cycling Team	+ 5h 23' 42"
132	Josef Černý (CZE)	Soudal–Quick-Step	+ 5h 29' 33"
133	Edoardo Affini (ITA)	Visma–Lease a Bike	+ 5h 29' 52"
134	Tord Gudmestad (NOR)	Decathlon–AG2R La Mondiale	+ 5h 30' 25"
135	Giosuè Epis (ITA)	Arkéa–B&B Hotels	+ 5h 31' 00"
136	Ethan Hayter (GBR)	Soudal–Quick-Step	+ 5h 31' 39"
137	Clément Davy (FRA)	Groupama–FDJ	+ 5h 32' 29"
138	Luca Mozzato (ITA)	Arkéa–B&B Hotels	+ 5h 33' 26"
139	Jan Maas (NED)	Cofidis	+ 5h 34' 04"
140	Nicolas Debeaumarché (FRA)	Cofidis	+ 5h 34' 38"
141	Andrea Pietrobon (ITA)	Team Polti VisitMalta	+ 5h 36' 27"
142	Matevž Govekar (SLO)	Team Bahrain Victorious	+ 5h 38' 24"
143	Michael Hepburn (AUS)	Team Jayco–AlUla	+ 5h 38' 36"
144	Francisco Muñoz (ESP)	Team Polti VisitMalta	+ 5h 41' 19"
145	Sam Bennett (IRL)	Decathlon–AG2R La Mondiale	+ 5h 41' 25"
146	Luke Lamperti (USA)	Soudal–Quick-Step	+ 5h 41' 38"
147	Anton Kuzmin (KAZ)	XDS Astana Team	+ 5h 42' 03"
148	Alex Edmondson (AUS)	Team Picnic–PostNL	+ 5h 42' 42"
149	Olav Kooij (NED)	Visma–Lease a Bike	+ 5h 45' 37"
150	Casper van Uden (NED)	Team Picnic–PostNL	+ 5h 48' 34"
151	Enrico Zanoncello (ITA)	VF Group–Bardiani–CSF–Faizanè	+ 5h 51' 33"
152	Matteo Moschetti (ITA)	Q36.5 Pro Cycling Team	+ 5h 55' 35"
153	Gijs Van Hoecke (BEL)	Intermarché–Wanty	+ 5h 55' 56"
154	Maikel Zijlaard (NED)	Tudor Pro Cycling Team	+ 5h 56' 04"
155	Taco van der Hoorn (NED)	Intermarché–Wanty	+ 5h 57' 04"
156	Niklas Märkl (GER)	Team Picnic–PostNL	+ 5h 59' 46"
157	Gerben Thijssen (BEL)	Intermarché–Wanty	+ 6h 04' 31"
158	Jensen Plowright (AUS)	Alpecin–Deceuninck	+ 6h 07' 50"
159	Alexander Krieger (GER)	Tudor Pro Cycling Team	+ 6h 25' 03"

=== Points classification ===
Final points classification (1–10)
Rank	Rider	Team	Points
1	Mads Pedersen (DEN)	Lidl–Trek	295
2	Olav Kooij (NED)	Visma–Lease a Bike	185
3	Wout van Aert (BEL)	Visma–Lease a Bike	127
4	Dries De Bondt (BEL)	Decathlon–AG2R La Mondiale	127
5	Isaac del Toro (MEX)	UAE Team Emirates XRG	109
6	Kaden Groves (AUS)	Alpecin–Deceuninck	98
7	Casper van Uden (NED)	Team Picnic–PostNL	89
8	Alessandro Tonelli (ITA)	Team Polti VisitMalta	88
9	Richard Carapaz (ECU)	EF Education–EasyPost	77
10	Orluis Aular (VEN)	Movistar Team	76

=== Mountains classification ===
Final mountains classification (1–10)
Rank	Rider	Team	Points
1	Lorenzo Fortunato (ITA)	XDS Astana Team	355
2	Christian Scaroni (ITA)	XDS Astana Team	201
3	Nicolas Prodhomme (FRA)	Decathlon–AG2R La Mondiale	107
4	Manuele Tarozzi (ITA)	VF Group–Bardiani–CSF–Faizanè	87
5	Carlos Verona (ESP)	Lidl–Trek	61
6	Chris Harper (AUS)	Team Jayco–AlUla	60
7	Richard Carapaz (ECU)	EF Education–EasyPost	47
8	Romain Bardet (FRA)	Team Picnic–PostNL	47
9	Isaac del Toro (MEX)	UAE Team Emirates XRG	45
10	Pello Bilbao (ESP)	Team Bahrain Victorious	42

=== Young rider classification ===
Final young rider classification (1–10)
Rank	Rider	Team	Time
1	Isaac del Toro (MEX)	UAE Team Emirates XRG	82h 34' 57"
2	Giulio Pellizzari (ITA)	Red Bull–Bora–Hansgrohe	+ 5' 32"
3	Max Poole (GBR)	Team Picnic–PostNL	+ 14' 19"
4	Davide Piganzoli (ITA)	Team Polti VisitMalta	+ 23' 57"
5	Antonio Tiberi (ITA)	Team Bahrain Victorious	+ 42' 08"
6	Embret Svestad-Bårdseng (NOR)	Arkéa–B&B Hotels	+ 1h 02' 44"
7	Edoardo Zambanini (ITA)	Team Bahrain Victorious	+ 1h 22' 03"
8	Marco Frigo (ITA)	Israel–Premier Tech	+ 1h 28' 24"
9	Gianmarco Garofoli (ITA)	Soudal–Quick-Step	+ 1h 49' 57"
10	Igor Arrieta (ESP)	UAE Team Emirates XRG	+ 1h 56' 19"

=== Team classification ===
Final team classification (1–10)
Rank	Team	Time
1	(United Arab Emirates) UAE Team Emirates XRG	247h 53' 24"
2	Team Bahrain Victorious	+ 58' 40"
3	(Netherlands) Visma–Lease a Bike	+ 1h 15' 37"
4	(Kazakhstan) XDS Astana Team	+ 1h 46' 40"
5	(Switzerland) Tudor Pro Cycling Team	+ 1h 52' 53"
6	(Spain) Movistar Team	+ 1h 52' 56"
7	(Netherlands) Team Picnic–PostNL	+ 2h 25' 21"
8	(Germany) Red Bull–Bora–Hansgrohe	+ 2h 52' 52"
9	Israel–Premier Tech	+ 3h 06' 01"
10	(United Kingdom) INEOS Grenadiers	+ 3h 09' 08"

=== Intermediate sprint classification ===
Final intermediate sprint classification (1–10)
Rank	Rider	Team	Points
1	Dries De Bondt (BEL)	Decathlon–AG2R La Mondiale	115
2	Alessandro Tonelli (ITA)	Team Polti VisitMalta	88
3	Mads Pedersen (DEN)	Lidl–Trek	87
4	Wout van Aert (BEL)	Visma–Lease a Bike	48
5	Giosuè Epis (ITA)	Arkéa–B&B Hotels	44
6	Manuele Tarozzi (ITA)	VF Group–Bardiani–CSF–Faizanè	40
7	Taco van der Hoorn (NED)	Intermarché–Wanty	34
8	Enzo Paleni (FRA)	Groupama–FDJ	32
9	Lorenzo Fortunato (ITA)	XDS Astana Team	29
10	Martin Marcellusi (ITA)	VF Group–Bardiani–CSF–Faizanè	28

=== Breakaway classification ===
Final breakaway classification (1–10)
Rank	Rider	Team	Kilometers
1	Manuele Tarozzi (ITA)	VF Group–Bardiani–CSF–Faizanè	418
2	Alessandro Tonelli (ITA)	Team Polti VisitMalta	368
3	Lorenzo Germani (ITA)	Groupama–FDJ	342
4	Dries De Bondt (BEL)	Decathlon–AG2R La Mondiale	335
5	Taco van der Hoorn (NED)	Intermarché–Wanty	285
6	Nicolas Prodhomme (FRA)	Decathlon–AG2R La Mondiale	275
7	Lorenzo Fortunato (ITA)	XDS Astana Team	269
8	Giosuè Epis (ITA)	Arkéa–B&B Hotels	236
9	Martin Marcellusi (ITA)	VF Group–Bardiani–CSF–Faizanè	235
10	Chris Hamilton (AUS)	Team Picnic–PostNL	227

=== Red Bull KM classification ===
Final Red Bull KM classification (1–10)
Rank	Rider	Team	Points
1	Manuele Tarozzi (ITA)	VF Group–Bardiani–CSF–Faizanè	45
2	Isaac del Toro (MEX)	UAE Team Emirates XRG	33
3	Christian Scaroni (ITA)	XDS Astana Team	30
4	Carlos Verona (ESP)	Lidl–Trek	28
5	Martin Marcellusi (ITA)	VF Group–Bardiani–CSF–Faizanè	22
6	Alessandro Tonelli (ITA)	Team Polti VisitMalta	19
7	Andrea Pietrobon (ITA)	Team Polti VisitMalta	16
8	Antonio Tiberi (ITA)	Team Bahrain Victorious	15
9	Chris Harper (AUS)	Team Jayco–AlUla	15
10	Nairo Quintana (COL)	Movistar Team	15

Preceded by 2024 Vuelta a España	Grand Tour	Succeeded by 2025 Tour de France
