= 2025 Giro d'Italia, Stage 1 to Stage 11 =

Cycling results

The 2025 Giro d'Italia is the 108th edition of the Giro d'Italia, one of cycling's Grand Tours. The Giro began in Durrës on 9 May, and Stage 11 will occur on 21 May with a stage to Castelnovo ne' Monti. The race will finish in Rome on 1 June.

== Classification standings ==
Legend
Denotes the leader of the general classification	Denotes the leader of the mountains classification
Denotes the leader of the points classification	Denotes the leader of the young rider classification
Denotes the winner of the combativity award	

== Stage 1 ==
9 May 2025 — Durrës (Albania) to Tirana (Albania), 160 km (99 mi)

Stage 1 Result
Rank	Rider	Team	Time
1	Mads Pedersen (DEN)	Lidl–Trek	3h 36' 24"
2	Wout van Aert (BEL)	Visma–Lease a Bike	+ 0"
3	Orluis Aular (VEN)	Movistar Team	+ 0"
4	Francesco Busatto (ITA)	Intermarché–Wanty	+ 0"
5	Tom Pidcock (GBR)	Q36.5 Pro Cycling Team	+ 0"
6	Diego Ulissi (ITA)	XDS Astana Team	+ 0"
7	Richard Carapaz (ECU)	EF Education–EasyPost	+ 0"
8	Max Poole (GBR)	Team Picnic–PostNL	+ 0"
9	Nicola Conci (ITA)	XDS Astana Team	+ 0"
10	Davide Piganzoli (ITA)	Team Polti VisitMalta	+ 0"

General classification after Stage 1
Rank	Rider	Team	Time
1	Mads Pedersen (DEN)	Lidl–Trek	3h 36' 14"
2	Wout van Aert (BEL)	Visma–Lease a Bike	+ 4"
3	Orluis Aular (VEN)	Movistar Team	+ 6"
4	Francesco Busatto (ITA)	Intermarché–Wanty	+ 10"
5	Tom Pidcock (GBR)	Q36.5 Pro Cycling Team	+ 10"
6	Diego Ulissi (ITA)	XDS Astana Team	+ 10"
7	Richard Carapaz (ECU)	EF Education–EasyPost	+ 10"
8	Max Poole (GBR)	Team Picnic–PostNL	+ 10"
9	Nicola Conci (ITA)	XDS Astana Team	+ 10"
10	Davide Piganzoli (ITA)	Team Polti VisitMalta	+ 10"

== Stage 2 ==
10 May 2025 — Tirana (Albania) to Tirana (Albania), 13.7 km (8.5 mi) (ITT)

Stage 2 Result
Rank	Rider	Team	Time
1	Joshua Tarling (GBR)	INEOS Grenadiers	16' 07"
2	Primož Roglič (SLO)	Red Bull–Bora–Hansgrohe	+ 1"
3	Jay Vine (AUS)	UAE Team Emirates XRG	+ 3"
4	Edoardo Affini (ITA)	Visma–Lease a Bike	+ 6"
5	Mathias Vacek (CZE)	Lidl–Trek	+ 6"
6	Daan Hoole (NED)	Lidl–Trek	+ 8"
7	Mads Pedersen (DEN)	Lidl–Trek	+ 12"
8	Brandon McNulty (USA)	UAE Team Emirates XRG	+ 13"
9	Ethan Hayter (GBR)	Soudal–Quick-Step	+ 14"
10	Juan Ayuso (ESP)	UAE Team Emirates XRG	+ 17"

General classification after Stage 2
Rank	Rider	Team	Time
1	Primož Roglič (SLO)	Red Bull–Bora–Hansgrohe	3h 52' 32"
2	Mads Pedersen (DEN)	Lidl–Trek	+ 1"
3	Mathias Vacek (CZE)	Lidl–Trek	+ 5"
4	Brandon McNulty (USA)	UAE Team Emirates XRG	+ 12"
5	Juan Ayuso (ESP)	UAE Team Emirates XRG	+ 16"
6	Isaac del Toro (MEX)	UAE Team Emirates XRG	+ 17"
7	Max Poole (GBR)	Team Picnic–PostNL	+ 24"
8	Antonio Tiberi (ITA)	Team Bahrain Victorious	+ 25"
9	Michael Storer (AUS)	Tudor Pro Cycling Team	+ 27"
10	Giulio Pellizzari (ITA)	Red Bull–Bora–Hansgrohe	+ 31"

== Stage 3 ==
11 May 2025 — Vlorë (Albania) to Vlorë (Albania), 160 km (99 mi)

Stage 3 Result
Rank	Rider	Team	Time
1	Mads Pedersen (DEN)	Lidl–Trek	3h 49' 47"
2	Corbin Strong (NZL)	Israel–Premier Tech	+ 0"
3	Orluis Aular (VEN)	Movistar Team	+ 0"
4	Brandon Rivera (COL)	INEOS Grenadiers	+ 0"
5	Edoardo Zambanini (ITA)	Team Bahrain Victorious	+ 0"
6	Stefano Oldani (ITA)	Cofidis	+ 0"
7	Andrea Vendrame (ITA)	Decathlon–AG2R La Mondiale	+ 0"
8	Filippo Fiorelli (ITA)	VF Group–Bardiani–CSF–Faizanè	+ 0"
9	Christian Scaroni (ITA)	XDS Astana Team	+ 0"
10	Davide De Pretto (ITA)	Team Jayco–AlUla	+ 0"

General classification after Stage 3
Rank	Rider	Team	Time
1	Mads Pedersen (DEN)	Lidl–Trek	7h 42' 10"
2	Primož Roglič (SLO)	Red Bull–Bora–Hansgrohe	+ 9"
3	Mathias Vacek (CZE)	Lidl–Trek	+ 14"
4	Brandon McNulty (USA)	UAE Team Emirates XRG	+ 21"
5	Juan Ayuso (ESP)	UAE Team Emirates XRG	+ 25"
6	Isaac del Toro (MEX)	UAE Team Emirates XRG	+ 26"
7	Max Poole (GBR)	Team Picnic–PostNL	+ 33"
8	Antonio Tiberi (ITA)	Team Bahrain Victorious	+ 34"
9	Michael Storer (AUS)	Tudor Pro Cycling Team	+ 36"
10	Giulio Pellizzari (ITA)	Red Bull–Bora–Hansgrohe	+ 40"

== Rest day 1 ==
12 May 2025 — Vlorë (Albania)

== Stage 4 ==
13 May 2025 — Alberobello to Lecce, 189 km (117 mi)

Stage 4 Result
Rank	Rider	Team	Time
1	Casper van Uden (NED)	Team Picnic–PostNL	4h 02' 21"
2	Olav Kooij (NED)	Visma–Lease a Bike	+ 0"
3	Maikel Zijlaard (NED)	Tudor Pro Cycling Team	+ 0"
4	Mads Pedersen (DEN)	Lidl–Trek	+ 0"
5	Kaden Groves (AUS)	Alpecin–Deceuninck	+ 0"
6	Sam Bennett (IRL)	Decathlon–AG2R La Mondiale	+ 0"
7	Paul Magnier (FRA)	Soudal–Quick-Step	+ 0"
8	Ben Turner (GBR)	INEOS Grenadiers	+ 0"
9	Matteo Moschetti (ITA)	Q36.5 Pro Cycling Team	+ 0"
10	Enrico Zanoncello (ITA)	VF Group–Bardiani–CSF–Faizanè	+ 0"

General classification after Stage 4
Rank	Rider	Team	Time
1	Mads Pedersen (DEN)	Lidl–Trek	11h 44' 31"
2	Primož Roglič (SLO)	Red Bull–Bora–Hansgrohe	+ 7"
3	Mathias Vacek (CZE)	Lidl–Trek	+ 14"
4	Brandon McNulty (USA)	UAE Team Emirates XRG	+ 21"
5	Isaac del Toro (MEX)	UAE Team Emirates XRG	+ 22"
6	Juan Ayuso (ESP)	UAE Team Emirates XRG	+ 25"
7	Max Poole (GBR)	Team Picnic–PostNL	+ 33"
8	Antonio Tiberi (ITA)	Team Bahrain Victorious	+ 34"
9	Michael Storer (AUS)	Tudor Pro Cycling Team	+ 36"
10	Giulio Pellizzari (ITA)	Red Bull–Bora–Hansgrohe	+ 40"

== Stage 5 ==
14 May 2025 — Ceglie Messapica to Matera, 151 km (94 mi)

Stage 5 Result
Rank	Rider	Team	Time
1	Mads Pedersen (DEN)	Lidl–Trek	3h 27' 31"
2	Edoardo Zambanini (ITA)	Team Bahrain Victorious	+ 0"
3	Tom Pidcock (GBR)	Q36.5 Pro Cycling Team	+ 0"
4	Orluis Aular (VEN)	Movistar Team	+ 0"
5	Filippo Fiorelli (ITA)	VF Group–Bardiani–CSF–Faizanè	+ 0"
6	Michael Storer (AUS)	Tudor Pro Cycling Team	+ 0"
7	Quentin Pacher (FRA)	Groupama–FDJ	+ 0"
8	Brandon Rivera (COL)	INEOS Grenadiers	+ 0"
9	Damiano Caruso (ITA)	Team Bahrain Victorious	+ 0"
10	Isaac del Toro (MEX)	UAE Team Emirates XRG	+ 0"

General classification after Stage 5
Rank	Rider	Team	Time
1	Mads Pedersen (DEN)	Lidl–Trek	15h 11' 52"
2	Primož Roglič (SLO)	Red Bull–Bora–Hansgrohe	+ 17"
3	Mathias Vacek (CZE)	Lidl–Trek	+ 24"
4	Brandon McNulty (USA)	UAE Team Emirates XRG	+ 31"
5	Isaac del Toro (MEX)	UAE Team Emirates XRG	+ 32"
6	Juan Ayuso (ESP)	UAE Team Emirates XRG	+ 35"
7	Max Poole (GBR)	Team Picnic–PostNL	+ 43"
8	Antonio Tiberi (ITA)	Team Bahrain Victorious	+ 44"
9	Michael Storer (AUS)	Tudor Pro Cycling Team	+ 46"
10	Giulio Pellizzari (ITA)	Red Bull–Bora–Hansgrohe	+ 50"

== Stage 6 ==
15 May 2025 — Potenza to Naples, 227 km (141 mi)

Due to a massive crash in the peloton, the race was neutralized between km 156 and 166.5 of the race. No points or bonus seconds were awarded at the last intermediate sprint and the finish and time differences at the finish line did not count towards the General Classification. Multiple riders abandoned the race, including former Giro winner Jai Hindley (Red Bull–Bora–Hansgrohe). Furthermore, many classification favorites—such as Mads Pedersen and Primož Roglič, chose to drop back from the main peloton for safety reasons. At the finale, Kaden Groves won the sprint ahead of Milan Fretin.

Stage 6 Result
Rank	Rider	Team	Time
1	Kaden Groves (AUS)	Alpecin–Deceuninck	4h 59' 52"
2	Milan Fretin (BEL)	Cofidis	+ 0"
3	Paul Magnier (FRA)	Soudal–Quick-Step	+ 0"
4	Max Kanter (GER)	XDS Astana Team	+ 0"
5	Giovanni Lonardi (ITA)	Team Polti VisitMalta	+ 0"
6	Maikel Zijlaard (NED)	Tudor Pro Cycling Team	+ 0"
7	Martin Marcellusi (ITA)	VF Group–Bardiani–CSF–Faizanè	+ 0"
8	Luca Mozzato (ITA)	Arkéa–B&B Hotels	+ 0"
9	Matevž Govekar (SLO)	Team Bahrain Victorious	+ 0"
10	Olav Kooij (NED)	Visma–Lease a Bike	+ 0"

General classification after Stage 6
Rank	Rider	Team	Time
1	Mads Pedersen (DEN)	Lidl–Trek	20h 11' 44"
2	Primož Roglič (SLO)	Red Bull–Bora–Hansgrohe	+ 17"
3	Mathias Vacek (CZE)	Lidl–Trek	+ 24"
4	Brandon McNulty (USA)	UAE Team Emirates XRG	+ 31"
5	Isaac del Toro (MEX)	UAE Team Emirates XRG	+ 32"
6	Juan Ayuso (ESP)	UAE Team Emirates XRG	+ 35"
7	Max Poole (GBR)	Team Picnic–PostNL	+ 43"
8	Antonio Tiberi (ITA)	Team Bahrain Victorious	+ 44"
9	Michael Storer (AUS)	Tudor Pro Cycling Team	+ 46"
10	Giulio Pellizzari (ITA)	Red Bull–Bora–Hansgrohe	+ 50"

== Stage 7 ==
16 May 2025 — Castel di Sangro to Tagliacozzo, 168 km (104 mi)

Stage 7 Result
Rank	Rider	Team	Time
1	Juan Ayuso (ESP)	UAE Team Emirates XRG	4h 20' 25"
2	Isaac del Toro (MEX)	UAE Team Emirates XRG	+ 4"
3	Egan Bernal (COL)	INEOS Grenadiers	+ 4"
4	Primož Roglič (SLO)	Red Bull–Bora–Hansgrohe	+ 4"
5	Giulio Ciccone (ITA)	Lidl–Trek	+ 4"
6	Antonio Tiberi (ITA)	Team Bahrain Victorious	+ 4"
7	Damiano Caruso (ITA)	Team Bahrain Victorious	+ 4"
8	Richard Carapaz (ECU)	EF Education–EasyPost	+ 4"
9	Max Poole (GBR)	Team Picnic–PostNL	+ 8"
10	Michael Storer (AUS)	Tudor Pro Cycling Team	+ 8"

General classification after Stage 7
Rank	Rider	Team	Time
1	Primož Roglič (SLO)	Red Bull–Bora–Hansgrohe	24h 32' 20"
2	Juan Ayuso (ESP)	UAE Team Emirates XRG	+ 4"
3	Isaac del Toro (MEX)	UAE Team Emirates XRG	+ 9"
4	Antonio Tiberi (ITA)	Team Bahrain Victorious	+ 27"
5	Max Poole (GBR)	Team Picnic–PostNL	+ 30"
6	Michael Storer (AUS)	Tudor Pro Cycling Team	+ 33"
7	Brandon McNulty (USA)	UAE Team Emirates XRG	+ 34"
8	Mathias Vacek (CZE)	Lidl–Trek	+ 37"
9	Simon Yates (GBR)	Visma–Lease a Bike	+ 39"
10	Richard Carapaz (ECU)	EF Education–EasyPost	+ 39"

== Stage 8 ==
17 May 2025 — Giulianova to Castelraimondo, 197 km (122 mi)

Stage 8 Result
Rank	Rider	Team	Time
1	Luke Plapp (AUS)	Team Jayco–AlUla	4h 44' 20"
2	Wilco Kelderman (NED)	Visma–Lease a Bike	+ 38"
3	Diego Ulissi (ITA)	XDS Astana Team	+ 38"
4	Igor Arrieta (ESP)	UAE Team Emirates XRG	+ 1' 22"
5	Nicolas Prodhomme (FRA)	Decathlon–AG2R La Mondiale	+ 1' 35"
6	Andrea Vendrame (ITA)	Decathlon–AG2R La Mondiale	+ 1' 48"
7	Lorenzo Fortunato (ITA)	XDS Astana Team	+ 1' 48"
8	Georg Steinhauser (GER)	EF Education–EasyPost	+ 2' 59"
9	Romain Bardet (FRA)	Team Picnic–PostNL	+ 3' 02"
10	Alessio Martinelli (ITA)	VF Group–Bardiani–CSF–Faizanè	+ 4' 37"

General classification after Stage 8
Rank	Rider	Team	Time
1	Diego Ulissi (ITA)	XDS Astana Team	29h 21' 23"
2	Lorenzo Fortunato (ITA)	XDS Astana Team	+ 12"
3	Primož Roglič (SLO)	Red Bull–Bora–Hansgrohe	+ 17"
4	Juan Ayuso (ESP)	UAE Team Emirates XRG	+ 20"
5	Isaac del Toro (MEX)	UAE Team Emirates XRG	+ 26"
6	Antonio Tiberi (ITA)	Team Bahrain Victorious	+ 44"
7	Max Poole (GBR)	Team Picnic–PostNL	+ 47"
8	Michael Storer (AUS)	Tudor Pro Cycling Team	+ 50"
9	Brandon McNulty (USA)	UAE Team Emirates XRG	+ 51"
10	Simon Yates (GBR)	Visma–Lease a Bike	+ 56"

== Stage 9 ==
18 May 2025 — Gubbio to Siena, 181 km (112 mi)

Stage 9 Result
Rank	Rider	Team	Time
1	Wout van Aert (BEL)	Visma–Lease a Bike	4h 15' 08"
2	Isaac del Toro (MEX)	UAE Team Emirates XRG	+ 0"
3	Giulio Ciccone (ITA)	Lidl–Trek	+ 58"
4	Richard Carapaz (ECU)	EF Education–EasyPost	+ 58"
5	Simon Yates (GBR)	Visma–Lease a Bike	+ 1' 00"
6	Antonio Tiberi (ITA)	Team Bahrain Victorious	+ 1' 00"
7	Juan Ayuso (ESP)	UAE Team Emirates XRG	+ 1' 07"
8	Thymen Arensman (NED)	INEOS Grenadiers	+ 1' 10"
9	Egan Bernal (COL)	INEOS Grenadiers	+ 1' 10"
10	Adam Yates (GBR)	UAE Team Emirates XRG	+ 1' 10"

General classification after Stage 9
Rank	Rider	Team	Time
1	Isaac del Toro (MEX)	UAE Team Emirates XRG	33h 36' 45"
2	Juan Ayuso (ESP)	UAE Team Emirates XRG	+ 1' 13"
3	Antonio Tiberi (ITA)	Team Bahrain Victorious	+ 1' 30"
4	Richard Carapaz (ECU)	EF Education–EasyPost	+ 1' 40"
5	Giulio Ciccone (ITA)	Lidl–Trek	+ 1' 41"
6	Simon Yates (GBR)	Visma–Lease a Bike	+ 1' 42"
7	Egan Bernal (COL)	INEOS Grenadiers	+ 1' 57"
8	Brandon McNulty (USA)	UAE Team Emirates XRG	+ 1' 59"
9	Adam Yates (GBR)	UAE Team Emirates XRG	+ 2' 01"
10	Primož Roglič (SLO)	Red Bull–Bora–Hansgrohe	+ 2' 25"

== Rest day 2 ==
19 May 2025 — Siena

== Stage 10 ==
20 May 2025 — Lucca to Pisa, 28.6 km (17.8 mi) (ITT)

Stage 10 Result
Rank	Rider	Team	Time
1	Daan Hoole (NED)	Lidl–Trek	32' 30"
2	Joshua Tarling (GBR)	INEOS Grenadiers	+ 7"
3	Ethan Hayter (GBR)	Soudal–Quick-Step	+ 10"
4	Mattia Cattaneo (ITA)	Soudal–Quick-Step	+ 23"
5	Edoardo Affini (ITA)	Visma–Lease a Bike	+ 24"
6	Jay Vine (AUS)	UAE Team Emirates XRG	+ 37"
7	Luke Plapp (AUS)	Team Jayco–AlUla	+ 44"
8	Marco Frigo (ITA)	Israel–Premier Tech	+ 47"
9	Michael Hepburn (AUS)	Team Jayco–AlUla	+ 50"
10	Xabier Azparren (ESP)	Q36.5 Pro Cycling Team	+ 54"

General classification after Stage 10
Rank	Rider	Team	Time
1	Isaac del Toro (MEX)	UAE Team Emirates XRG	34h 11' 37"
2	Juan Ayuso (ESP)	UAE Team Emirates XRG	+ 25"
3	Antonio Tiberi (ITA)	Team Bahrain Victorious	+ 1' 01"
4	Simon Yates (GBR)	Visma–Lease a Bike	+ 1' 03"
5	Primož Roglič (SLO)	Red Bull–Bora–Hansgrohe	+ 1' 18"
6	Brandon McNulty (USA)	UAE Team Emirates XRG	+ 2' 00"
7	Adam Yates (GBR)	UAE Team Emirates XRG	+ 2' 06"
8	Giulio Ciccone (ITA)	Lidl–Trek	+ 2' 07"
9	Richard Carapaz (ECU)	EF Education–EasyPost	+ 2' 10"
10	Thymen Arensman (NED)	INEOS Grenadiers	+ 2' 27"

== Stage 11 ==
21 May 2025 — Viareggio to Castelnovo ne' Monti, 186 km (116 mi)

Stage 11 Result
Rank	Rider	Team	Time
1	Richard Carapaz (ECU)	EF Education–EasyPost	4h 35' 22"
2	Isaac del Toro (MEX)	UAE Team Emirates XRG	+ 10"
3	Giulio Ciccone (ITA)	Lidl–Trek	+ 10"
4	Tom Pidcock (GBR)	Q36.5 Pro Cycling Team	+ 10"
5	Egan Bernal (COL)	INEOS Grenadiers	+ 10"
6	Antonio Tiberi (ITA)	Team Bahrain Victorious	+ 10"
7	Juan Ayuso (ESP)	UAE Team Emirates XRG	+ 10"
8	Einer Rubio (COL)	Movistar Team	+ 10"
9	Derek Gee (CAN)	Israel–Premier Tech	+ 10"
10	Diego Ulissi (ITA)	XDS Astana Team	+ 10"

General classification after Stage 11
Rank	Rider	Team	Time
1	Isaac del Toro (MEX)	UAE Team Emirates XRG	38h 47' 01"
2	Juan Ayuso (ESP)	UAE Team Emirates XRG	+ 31"
3	Antonio Tiberi (ITA)	Team Bahrain Victorious	+ 1' 07"
4	Simon Yates (GBR)	Visma–Lease a Bike	+ 1' 09"
5	Primož Roglič (SLO)	Red Bull–Bora–Hansgrohe	+ 1' 24"
6	Richard Carapaz (ECU)	EF Education–EasyPost	+ 1' 56"
7	Giulio Ciccone (ITA)	Lidl–Trek	+ 2' 09"
8	Brandon McNulty (USA)	UAE Team Emirates XRG	+ 2' 16"
9	Adam Yates (GBR)	UAE Team Emirates XRG	+ 2' 33"
10	Thymen Arensman (NED)	INEOS Grenadiers	+ 2' 33"
