= Francisco Muñoz (cyclist) =

Spanish cyclist (born 2001)

Personal information
- Full name: Francisco Muñoz Llana
- Born: 24 June 2001 (age 25) Oviedo, Spain
- Height: 1.81 m (5 ft 11 in)
- Weight: 71 kg (157 lb)

Cycling career
- Sport: Cycling
- Current team: Team Polti VisitMalta
- Discipline: Road
- Role: Rider

Amateur teams
- 2019: Bathco Cycling Team
- 2020: Compak–Campo Claro
- 2021: Team MP Group
- 2022–2023: EOLO-Kometa U23

Professional teams
- 2022: Eolo–Kometa (stagiaire)
- 2023: Eolo–Kometa (stagiaire)
- 2024–: Polti–Kometa

Francisco Muñoz Llana (born 24 June 2001) is a Spanish racing cyclist, who currently rides for UCI ProTeam Team Polti VisitMalta.

== Major results ==
2022
1st Overall Copa de España Under-23
1st Gran Premio Primavera de Ontur
2023
3rd Road race, National Under-23 Road Championships
2024
Combativity award Stage 4 Giro d'Italia
2026
8th Overall Danmark Rundt

=== Grand Tour general classification results timeline ===
Grand Tour	2024	2025
Giro d'Italia	122	144
Tour de France	—	
Vuelta a España	—	
