= 2025 Giro d'Italia, Stage 12 to Stage 21 =

Cycling results

The 2025 Giro d'Italia is the 108th edition of the Giro d'Italia, one of cycling's Grand Tours. The Giro began in Durrës on 9 May, and Stage 12 occurred on 22 May with a stage to Viadana. The race will finish in Rome on 1 June.

== Classification standings ==
Legend
Denotes the leader of the general classification	Denotes the leader of the mountains classification
Denotes the leader of the points classification	Denotes the leader of the young rider classification
Denotes the winner of the combativity award	

== Stage 12 ==
22 May 2025 — Modena to Viadana, 172 km (107 mi)

Stage 12 Result
Rank	Rider	Team	Time
1	Olav Kooij (NED)	Visma–Lease a Bike	3h 55' 40"
2	Casper van Uden (NED)	Team Picnic–PostNL	+ 0"
3	Ben Turner (GBR)	INEOS Grenadiers	+ 0"
4	Mads Pedersen (DEN)	Lidl–Trek	+ 0"
5	Kaden Groves (AUS)	Alpecin–Deceuninck	+ 0"
6	Milan Fretin (BEL)	Cofidis	+ 0"
7	Max Kanter (GER)	XDS Astana Team	+ 0"
8	Paul Magnier (FRA)	Soudal–Quick-Step	+ 0"
9	Matevž Govekar (SLO)	Team Bahrain Victorious	+ 0"
10	Matteo Moschetti (ITA)	Q36.5 Pro Cycling Team	+ 0"

General classification after Stage 12
Rank	Rider	Team	Time
1	Isaac del Toro (MEX)	UAE Team Emirates XRG	42h 42' 39"
2	Juan Ayuso (ESP)	UAE Team Emirates XRG	+ 33"
3	Antonio Tiberi (ITA)	Team Bahrain Victorious	+ 1' 09"
4	Simon Yates (GBR)	Visma–Lease a Bike	+ 1' 11"
5	Primož Roglič (SLO)	Red Bull–Bora–Hansgrohe	+ 1' 26"
6	Richard Carapaz (ECU)	EF Education–EasyPost	+ 1' 58"
7	Giulio Ciccone (ITA)	Lidl–Trek	+ 2' 11"
8	Brandon McNulty (USA)	UAE Team Emirates XRG	+ 2' 18"
9	Adam Yates (GBR)	UAE Team Emirates XRG	+ 2' 35"
10	Thymen Arensman (NED)	INEOS Grenadiers	+ 2' 35"

== Stage 13 ==
23 May 2025 — Rovigo to Vicenza, 180 km (110 mi)

Stage 13 Result
Rank	Rider	Team	Time
1	Mads Pedersen (DEN)	Lidl–Trek	3h 50' 24"
2	Wout van Aert (BEL)	Visma–Lease a Bike	+ 0"
3	Isaac del Toro (MEX)	UAE Team Emirates XRG	+ 2"
4	Rémy Rochas (FRA)	Groupama–FDJ	+ 5"
5	Dorian Godon (FRA)	Decathlon–AG2R La Mondiale	+ 5"
6	Primož Roglič (SLO)	Red Bull–Bora–Hansgrohe	+ 5"
7	Antonio Tiberi (ITA)	Team Bahrain Victorious	+ 5"
8	Derek Gee (CAN)	Israel–Premier Tech	+ 5"
9	Orluis Aular (VEN)	Movistar Team	+ 5"
10	Egan Bernal (COL)	INEOS Grenadiers	+ 5"

General classification after Stage 13
Rank	Rider	Team	Time
1	Isaac del Toro (MEX)	UAE Team Emirates XRG	46h 32' 59"
2	Juan Ayuso (ESP)	UAE Team Emirates XRG	+ 38"
3	Antonio Tiberi (ITA)	Team Bahrain Victorious	+ 1' 18"
4	Simon Yates (GBR)	Visma–Lease a Bike	+ 1' 20"
5	Primož Roglič (SLO)	Red Bull–Bora–Hansgrohe	+ 1' 35"
6	Richard Carapaz (ECU)	EF Education–EasyPost	+ 2' 07"
7	Giulio Ciccone (ITA)	Lidl–Trek	+ 2' 20"
8	Brandon McNulty (USA)	UAE Team Emirates XRG	+ 2' 40"
9	Egan Bernal (COL)	INEOS Grenadiers	+ 2' 50"
10	Derek Gee (CAN)	Israel–Premier Tech	+ 2' 54"

== Stage 14 ==
24 May 2025 — Treviso to Nova Gorica (Slovenia), 195 km (121 mi)

Stage 14 Result
Rank	Rider	Team	Time
1	Kasper Asgreen (DEN)	EF Education–EasyPost	4h 04' 40"
2	Kaden Groves (AUS)	Alpecin–Deceuninck	+ 16"
3	Olav Kooij (NED)	Visma–Lease a Bike	+ 16"
4	Orluis Aular (VEN)	Movistar Team	+ 16"
5	Stefano Oldani (ITA)	Cofidis	+ 16"
6	Mirco Maestri (ITA)	Team Polti VisitMalta	+ 16"
7	Derek Gee (CAN)	Israel–Premier Tech	+ 16"
8	Tom Pidcock (GBR)	Q36.5 Pro Cycling Team	+ 16"
9	Richard Carapaz (ECU)	EF Education–EasyPost	+ 16"
10	Mikkel Frølich Honoré (DEN)	EF Education–EasyPost	+ 16"

General classification after Stage 14
Rank	Rider	Team	Time
1	Isaac del Toro (MEX)	UAE Team Emirates XRG	50h 37' 55"
2	Simon Yates (GBR)	Visma–Lease a Bike	+ 1' 20"
3	Juan Ayuso (ESP)	UAE Team Emirates XRG	+ 1' 26"
4	Richard Carapaz (ECU)	EF Education–EasyPost	+ 2' 07"
5	Primož Roglič (SLO)	Red Bull–Bora–Hansgrohe	+ 2' 23"
6	Derek Gee (CAN)	Israel–Premier Tech	+ 2' 54"
7	Damiano Caruso (ITA)	Team Bahrain Victorious	+ 2' 55"
8	Antonio Tiberi (ITA)	Team Bahrain Victorious	+ 3' 02"
9	Egan Bernal (COL)	INEOS Grenadiers	+ 3' 38"
10	Thymen Arensman (NED)	INEOS Grenadiers	+ 3' 45"

== Stage 15 ==
25 May 2025 — Fiume Veneto to Asiago, 219 km (136 mi)

Stage 15 Result
Rank	Rider	Team	Time
1	Carlos Verona (ESP)	Lidl–Trek	5h 15' 41"
2	Florian Stork (GER)	Tudor Pro Cycling Team	+ 22"
3	Christian Scaroni (ITA)	XDS Astana Team	+ 23"
4	Romain Bardet (FRA)	Team Picnic–PostNL	+ 23"
5	Nicolas Prodhomme (FRA)	Decathlon–AG2R La Mondiale	+ 23"
6	Filippo Zana (ITA)	Team Jayco–AlUla	+ 23"
7	Gianmarco Garofoli (ITA)	Soudal–Quick-Step	+ 26"
8	Filippo Fiorelli (ITA)	VF Group–Bardiani–CSF–Faizanè	+ 29"
9	Damiano Caruso (ITA)	Team Bahrain Victorious	+ 29"
10	Max Poole (GBR)	Team Picnic–PostNL	+ 29"

General classification after Stage 15
Rank	Rider	Team	Time
1	Isaac del Toro (MEX)	UAE Team Emirates XRG	55h 54' 05"
2	Simon Yates (GBR)	Visma–Lease a Bike	+ 1' 20"
3	Juan Ayuso (ESP)	UAE Team Emirates XRG	+ 1' 26"
4	Richard Carapaz (ECU)	EF Education–EasyPost	+ 2' 07"
5	Derek Gee (CAN)	Israel–Premier Tech	+ 2' 54"
6	Damiano Caruso (ITA)	Team Bahrain Victorious	+ 2' 55"
7	Antonio Tiberi (ITA)	Team Bahrain Victorious	+ 3' 02"
8	Egan Bernal (COL)	INEOS Grenadiers	+ 3' 38"
9	Thymen Arensman (NED)	INEOS Grenadiers	+ 3' 45"
10	Primož Roglič (SLO)	Red Bull–Bora–Hansgrohe	+ 3' 53"

== Rest day 3 ==
26 May 2025 — Asiago

== Stage 16 ==
27 May 2025 — Piazzola sul Brenta to San Valentino, 203 km (126 mi)

Stage 16 Result
Rank	Rider	Team	Time
1	Christian Scaroni (ITA)	XDS Astana Team	5h 35' 05"
2	Lorenzo Fortunato (ITA)	XDS Astana Team	+ 0"
3	Giulio Pellizzari (ITA)	Red Bull–Bora–Hansgrohe	+ 55"
4	Richard Carapaz (ECU)	EF Education–EasyPost	+ 1' 10"
5	Derek Gee (CAN)	Israel–Premier Tech	+ 1' 23"
6	Jefferson Alveiro Cepeda (ECU)	Movistar Team	+ 1' 43"
7	Michael Storer (AUS)	Tudor Pro Cycling Team	+ 1' 52"
8	Simon Yates (GBR)	Visma–Lease a Bike	+ 1' 52"
9	Gijs Leemreize (NED)	Team Picnic–PostNL	+ 2' 19"
10	Yannis Voisard (SUI)	Tudor Pro Cycling Team	+ 2' 31"

General classification after Stage 16
Rank	Rider	Team	Time
1	Isaac del Toro (MEX)	UAE Team Emirates XRG	61h 31' 56"
2	Simon Yates (GBR)	Visma–Lease a Bike	+ 26"
3	Richard Carapaz (ECU)	EF Education–EasyPost	+ 31"
4	Derek Gee (CAN)	Israel–Premier Tech	+ 1' 31"
5	Damiano Caruso (ITA)	Team Bahrain Victorious	+ 2' 40"
6	Egan Bernal (COL)	INEOS Grenadiers	+ 3' 23"
7	Michael Storer (AUS)	Tudor Pro Cycling Team	+ 3' 31"
8	Antonio Tiberi (ITA)	Team Bahrain Victorious	+ 4' 07"
9	Giulio Pellizzari (ITA)	Red Bull–Bora–Hansgrohe	+ 4' 36"
10	Adam Yates (GBR)	UAE Team Emirates XRG	+ 5' 08"

== Stage 17 ==
28 May 2025 — San Michele all'Adige to Bormio, 155 km (96 mi)

Stage 17 Result
Rank	Rider	Team	Time
1	Isaac del Toro (MEX)	UAE Team Emirates XRG	3h 58' 48"
2	Romain Bardet (FRA)	Team Picnic–PostNL	+ 4"
3	Richard Carapaz (ECU)	EF Education–EasyPost	+ 4"
4	Simon Yates (GBR)	Visma–Lease a Bike	+ 15"
5	Giulio Pellizzari (ITA)	Red Bull–Bora–Hansgrohe	+ 16"
6	Derek Gee (CAN)	Israel–Premier Tech	+ 16"
7	Damiano Caruso (ITA)	Team Bahrain Victorious	+ 16"
8	Einer Rubio (COL)	Movistar Team	+ 16"
9	Max Poole (GBR)	Team Picnic–PostNL	+ 16"
10	Afonso Eulálio (POR)	Team Bahrain Victorious	+ 56"

General classification after Stage 17
Rank	Rider	Team	Time
1	Isaac del Toro (MEX)	UAE Team Emirates XRG	65h 30' 34"
2	Richard Carapaz (ECU)	EF Education–EasyPost	+ 41"
3	Simon Yates (GBR)	Visma–Lease a Bike	+ 51"
4	Derek Gee (CAN)	Israel–Premier Tech	+ 1' 57"
5	Damiano Caruso (ITA)	Team Bahrain Victorious	+ 3' 06"
6	Egan Bernal (COL)	INEOS Grenadiers	+ 4' 43"
7	Giulio Pellizzari (ITA)	Red Bull–Bora–Hansgrohe	+ 5' 02"
8	Einer Rubio (COL)	Movistar Team	+ 6' 09"
9	Adam Yates (GBR)	UAE Team Emirates XRG	+ 7' 45"
10	Michael Storer (AUS)	Tudor Pro Cycling Team	+ 7' 46"

== Stage 18 ==
29 May 2025 — Morbegno to Cesano Maderno, 144 km (89 mi)

Stage 18 Result
Rank	Rider	Team	Time
1	Nico Denz (GER)	Red Bull–Bora–Hansgrohe	3h 12' 07"
2	Mirco Maestri (ITA)	Team Polti VisitMalta	+ 1' 01"
3	Edward Planckaert (BEL)	Alpecin–Deceuninck	+ 1' 01"
4	Filippo Magli (ITA)	VF Group–Bardiani–CSF–Faizanè	+ 1' 01"
5	Alex Edmondson (AUS)	Team Picnic–PostNL	+ 1' 01"
6	Dries De Bondt (BEL)	Decathlon–AG2R La Mondiale	+ 1' 01"
7	Daan Hoole (NED)	Lidl–Trek	+ 1' 01"
8	Davide De Pretto (ITA)	Team Jayco–AlUla	+ 1' 01"
9	Nicola Conci (ITA)	XDS Astana Team	+ 1' 01"
10	Larry Warbasse (USA)	Tudor Pro Cycling Team	+ 1' 01"

General classification after Stage 18
Rank	Rider	Team	Time
1	Isaac del Toro (MEX)	UAE Team Emirates XRG	68h 56' 32"
2	Richard Carapaz (ECU)	EF Education–EasyPost	+ 41"
3	Simon Yates (GBR)	Visma–Lease a Bike	+ 51"
4	Derek Gee (CAN)	Israel–Premier Tech	+ 1' 57"
5	Damiano Caruso (ITA)	Team Bahrain Victorious	+ 3' 06"
6	Egan Bernal (COL)	INEOS Grenadiers	+ 4' 43"
7	Giulio Pellizzari (ITA)	Red Bull–Bora–Hansgrohe	+ 5' 02"
8	Einer Rubio (COL)	Movistar Team	+ 6' 09"
9	Adam Yates (GBR)	UAE Team Emirates XRG	+ 7' 45"
10	Michael Storer (AUS)	Tudor Pro Cycling Team	+ 7' 46"

== Stage 19 ==
30 May 2025 — Biella to Champoluc, 166 km (103 mi)

Stage 19 Result
Rank	Rider	Team	Time
1	Nicolas Prodhomme (FRA)	Decathlon–AG2R La Mondiale	4h 50' 35"
2	Isaac del Toro (MEX)	UAE Team Emirates XRG	+ 58"
3	Richard Carapaz (ECU)	EF Education–EasyPost	+ 58"
4	Damiano Caruso (ITA)	Team Bahrain Victorious	+ 1' 22"
5	Brandon McNulty (USA)	UAE Team Emirates XRG	+ 1' 22"
6	Egan Bernal (COL)	INEOS Grenadiers	+ 1' 22"
7	Simon Yates (GBR)	Visma–Lease a Bike	+ 1' 22"
8	Rafał Majka (POL)	UAE Team Emirates XRG	+ 1' 22"
9	Antonio Tiberi (ITA)	Team Bahrain Victorious	+ 1' 22"
10	Einer Rubio (COL)	Movistar Team	+ 1' 22"

General classification after Stage 19
Rank	Rider	Team	Time
1	Isaac del Toro (MEX)	UAE Team Emirates XRG	73h 47' 59"
2	Richard Carapaz (ECU)	EF Education–EasyPost	+ 43"
3	Simon Yates (GBR)	Visma–Lease a Bike	+ 1' 21"
4	Derek Gee (CAN)	Israel–Premier Tech	+ 2' 27"
5	Damiano Caruso (ITA)	Team Bahrain Victorious	+ 3' 36"
6	Egan Bernal (COL)	INEOS Grenadiers	+ 5' 13"
7	Giulio Pellizzari (ITA)	Red Bull–Bora–Hansgrohe	+ 5' 32"
8	Einer Rubio (COL)	Movistar Team	+ 6' 39"
9	Michael Storer (AUS)	Tudor Pro Cycling Team	+ 9' 11"
10	Brandon McNulty (USA)	UAE Team Emirates XRG	+ 9' 33"

== Stage 20 ==
31 May 2025 — Verrès to Sestriere, 205 km (127 mi)

Stage 20 Result
Rank	Rider	Team	Time
1	Chris Harper (AUS)	Team Jayco–AlUla	5h 27' 29"
2	Alessandro Verre (ITA)	Arkéa–B&B Hotels	+ 1' 49"
3	Simon Yates (GBR)	Visma–Lease a Bike	+ 1' 57"
4	Gianmarco Garofoli (ITA)	Soudal–Quick-Step	+ 3' 52"
5	Rémy Rochas (FRA)	Groupama–FDJ	+ 3' 57"
6	Martin Marcellusi (ITA)	VF Group–Bardiani–CSF–Faizanè	+ 4' 31"
7	Carlos Verona (ESP)	Lidl–Trek	+ 4' 31"
8	Max Poole (GBR)	Team Picnic–PostNL	+ 6' 45"
9	Isaac del Toro (MEX)	UAE Team Emirates XRG	+ 7' 10"
10	Giulio Pellizzari (ITA)	Red Bull–Bora–Hansgrohe	+ 7' 10"

General classification after Stage 20
Rank	Rider	Team	Time
1	Simon Yates (GBR)	Visma–Lease a Bike	79h 18' 42"
2	Isaac del Toro (MEX)	UAE Team Emirates XRG	+ 3' 56"
3	Richard Carapaz (ECU)	EF Education–EasyPost	+ 4' 43"
4	Derek Gee (CAN)	Israel–Premier Tech	+ 6' 23"
5	Damiano Caruso (ITA)	Team Bahrain Victorious	+ 7' 32"
6	Giulio Pellizzari (ITA)	Red Bull–Bora–Hansgrohe	+ 9' 28"
7	Egan Bernal (COL)	INEOS Grenadiers	+ 12' 42"
8	Einer Rubio (COL)	Movistar Team	+ 13' 05"
9	Brandon McNulty (USA)	UAE Team Emirates XRG	+ 13' 36"
10	Michael Storer (AUS)	Tudor Pro Cycling Team	+ 14' 27"

== Stage 21 ==
1 June 2025 — Rome to Rome, 143 km (89 mi)

Stage 21 Result
Rank	Rider	Team	Time
1	Olav Kooij (NED)	Visma–Lease a Bike	3h 12' 19"
2	Kaden Groves (AUS)	Alpecin–Deceuninck	+ 0"
3	Matteo Moschetti (ITA)	Q36.5 Pro Cycling Team	+ 0"
4	Mads Pedersen (DEN)	Lidl–Trek	+ 0"
5	Luke Lamperti (USA)	Soudal–Quick-Step	+ 0"
6	Max Kanter (GER)	XDS Astana Team	+ 0"
7	Filippo Baroncini (ITA)	UAE Team Emirates XRG	+ 0"
8	Orluis Aular (VEN)	Movistar Team	+ 0"
9	Enrico Zanoncello (ITA)	VF Group–Bardiani–CSF–Faizanè	+ 0"
10	Giovanni Lonardi (ITA)	Team Polti VisitMalta	+ 0"

General classification after Stage 21
Rank	Rider	Team	Time
1	Simon Yates (GBR)	Visma–Lease a Bike	82h 31' 01"
2	Isaac del Toro (MEX)	UAE Team Emirates XRG	+ 3' 56"
3	Richard Carapaz (ECU)	EF Education–EasyPost	+ 4' 43"
4	Derek Gee (CAN)	Israel–Premier Tech	+ 6' 23"
5	Damiano Caruso (ITA)	Team Bahrain Victorious	+ 7' 32"
6	Giulio Pellizzari (ITA)	Red Bull–Bora–Hansgrohe	+ 9' 28"
7	Egan Bernal (COL)	INEOS Grenadiers	+ 12' 42"
8	Einer Rubio (COL)	Movistar Team	+ 13' 05"
9	Brandon McNulty (USA)	UAE Team Emirates XRG	+ 13' 36"
10	Michael Storer (AUS)	Tudor Pro Cycling Team	+ 14' 27"
