= Giosuè Epis =

Italian cyclist

Personal information
- Born: 4 March 2002 (age 24) Brescia, Italy
- Height: 1.69 m (5 ft 7 in)
- Weight: 64 kg (141 lb)

Cycling career
- Sport: Cycling
- Current team: Gallina Ecotek Lucchini
- Discipline: Road
- Role: Rider

Amateur teams
- 2019–2020: Aspiratori Otelli
- 2026–: Gallina Ecotek Lucchini

Professional teams
- 2021–2022: Iseo–Rime–Carnovali
- 2023: Zalf Euromobil Fior
- 2024: Arkéa–B&B Hôtels Continentale
- 2025: Arkéa–B&B Hotels
- 2026: Petrolike

Giosuè Epis (born 4 March 2002) is an Italian cyclist, who currently rides for club team Gallina Ecotek Lucchini. He previously spent a season with UCI WorldTeam Arkéa–B&B Hotels.

== Major results ==
2019
1st Stage 1b Tour de Gironde
3rd Trofeo Comune di Vertova
2022
1st Stage 2 Giro della Regione Friuli Venezia Giulia
2023
1st Due Giorni Marchigiana – GP Santa Rita
3rd Popolarissima

=== Grand Tour general classification results timeline ===
Grand Tour	2025
Giro d'Italia	135
Tour de France	—
Vuelta a España	—

Legend
—	Did not compete
DNF	Did not finish
