= Andrea Pietrobon =

Italian racing cyclist (born 1999)

Personal information
- Born: 11 March 1999 (age 27) Belluno, Italy
- Height: 1.90 m (6 ft 3 in)
- Weight: 72 kg (159 lb)

Cycling career
- Sport: Cycling
- Current team: Team Polti VisitMalta
- Discipline: Road
- Role: Rider
- Rider type: Climber

Amateur teams
- 2018–2019: Zalf–Euromobil–Désirée–Fior
- 2022: Eolo–Kometa U23

Professional teams
- 2020–2021: Cycling Team Friuli ASD
- 2022: Eolo–Kometa (stagiaire)
- 2023–: Eolo–Kometa

Andrea Pietrobon (born 11 March 1999) is an Italian cyclist who currently rides for UCI ProTeam Team Polti VisitMalta.

In addition to cycling, Pietrobon is an avid pianist.

== Major results ==
2017
2nd La Piccola Sanremo
4th Overall Tour du Pays de Vaud
8th Overall Giro della Lunigiana
8th Ronde van Vlaanderen Juniores
2018
3rd Trofeo Alcide Degasperi
2019
9th G.P. Palio del Recioto
2021
8th Giro del Belvedere
8th Trofeo Piva
2022
2nd Circuito Guadiana
2024
Combativity award Stage 13 Giro d'Italia

=== Grand Tour general classification results timeline ===
Grand Tour	2024	2025
Giro d'Italia	109	141
Tour de France	—	
Vuelta a España	—	
