= Nicolas Debeaumarché =

French cyclist

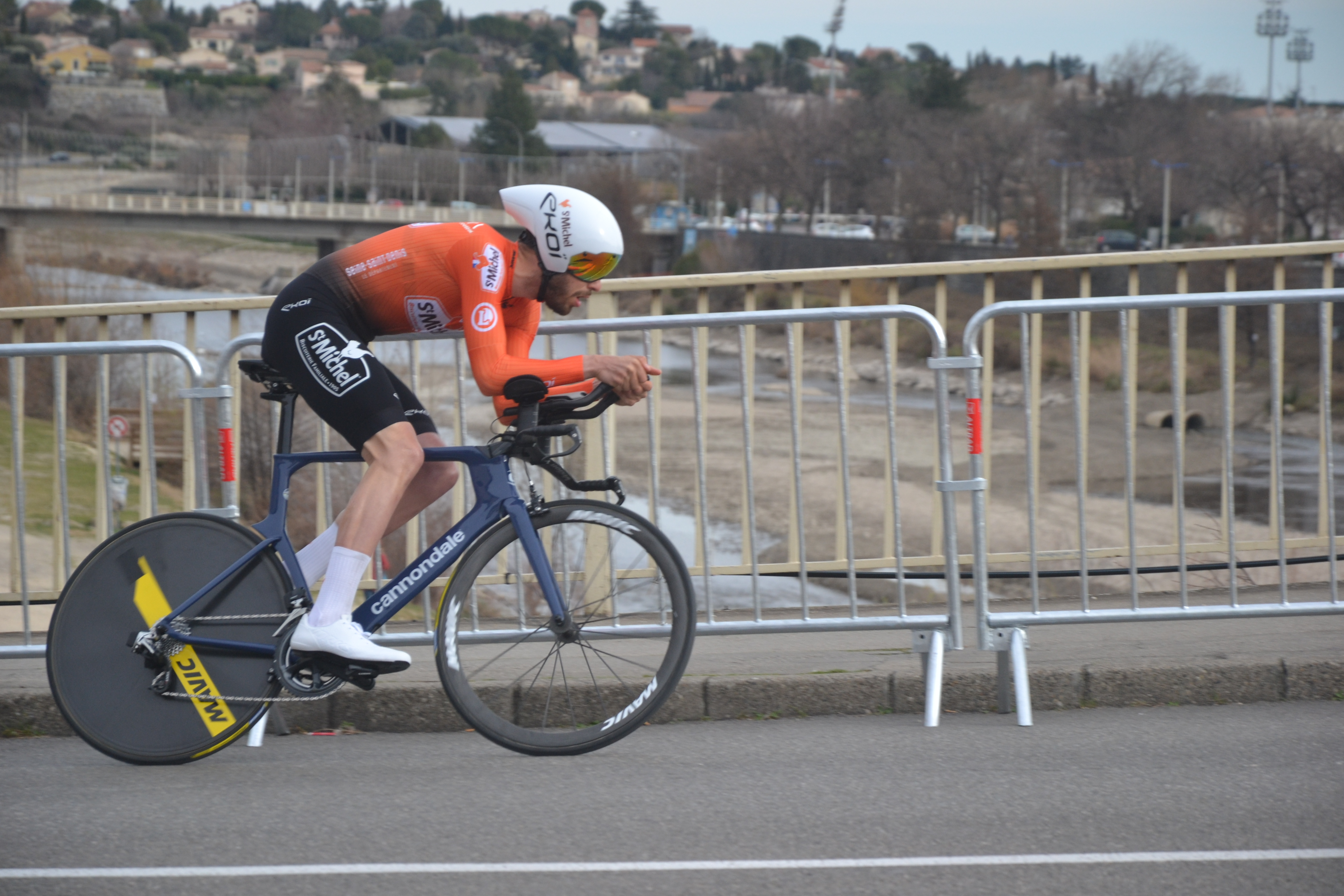
- Debeaumarché at the 2022 Étoile de Bessèges

Personal information
- Born: 24 February 1998 (age 28) Mâcon, France
- Height: 1.88 m (6 ft 2 in)
- Weight: 75 kg (165 lb)

Cycling career
- Sport: Cycling
- Current team: Cofidis
- Discipline: Road
- Role: Rider

Amateur teams
- 2014: VS Mâconnais
- 2015–2016: SCO Dijon Junior
- 2017–2021: SCO Dijon

Professional teams
- 2019: Trek–Segafredo (stagiaire)
- 2021: St. Michel–Auber93 (stagiaire)
- 2022–2023: St. Michel–Auber93
- 2024–: Cofidis

Nicolas Debeaumarché (born 24 February 1998) is a French cyclist, who currently rides for UCI WorldTeam Cofidis.

== Major results ==
2016
2nd Overall Tour des Portes du Pays d'Othe

1st Stage 1

2019
10th Overall Tour du Loir-et-Cher

1st Stage 4

2021
8th Grand Prix de la ville de Nogent-sur-Oise
2022
10th Grand Prix de la ville de Pérenchies
2023
4th Route Adélie

=== Grand Tour general classification results timeline ===
Grand Tour	2024
Giro d'Italia	114
Tour de France	
Vuelta a España	

Legend
—	Did not compete
DNF	Did not finish
