= Alessio Martinelli =

Italian cyclist

- Martinelli in 2026

Personal information
- Born: 26 April 2001 (age 25) Sondalo, Italy
- Height: 1.70 m (5 ft 7 in)

Cycling career
- Sport: Cycling
- Current team: Bardiani–CSF 7 Saber
- Discipline: Road
- Role: Rider

Amateur teams
- 2018: Team Fratelli Giorgi
- 2019: Team Giorgi ASD

Professional teams
- 2020–2021: Team Colpack–Ballan
- 2022–: Bardiani–CSF–Faizanè

Alessio Martinelli (born 26 April 2001) is an Italian racing cyclist, who currently rides for UCI ProTeam Bardiani–CSF 7 Saber.

== Major results ==
2018
8th Trofeo Citta di Loano
2019
1st Mountains classification, Tour du Pays de Vaud
2nd Road race, UCI Junior Road World Championships
2nd Overall Giro della Lunigiana

1st Stage 3

3rd Road race, National Junior Road Championships
5th Trofeo Emilio Paganessi
2021
4th Overall Giro della Regione Friuli Venezia Giulia

1st Young rider classification

4th Giro del Medio Brenta
2022
1st Grand Prix Alanya
1st Gran Premio Industrie del Marmo
5th Overall Carpathian Couriers Race

1st Stage 4 (ITT)

7th Giro dell'Appennino
2023
2nd Trofeo Banca Popolare di Vicenza
4th G.P. Palio del Recioto
4th Trofeo Andratx–Mirador D'es Colomer
4th Overall Istrian Spring Trophy
6th Overall Giro Next Gen

1st Best Italian rider

7th Trofeo Serra de Tramuntana
9th Overall Carpathian Couriers Race
