= Manuele Tarozzi =

Italian cyclist

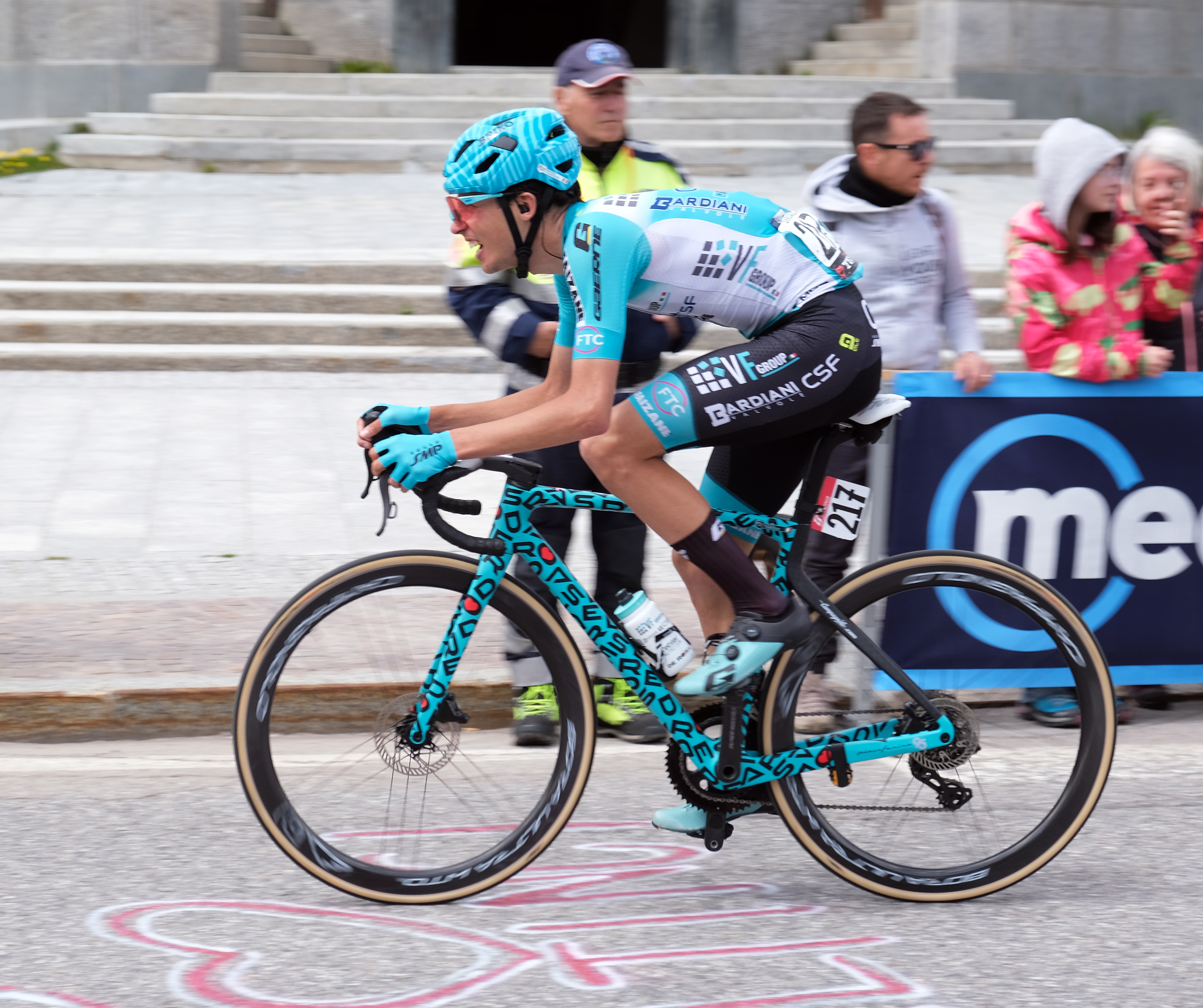
- Tarozzi in Giro d'Italia 2025

Personal information
- Born: 20 June 1998 (age 28) Faenza, Italy

Cycling career
- Sport: Cycling
- Current team: Bardiani–CSF 7 Saber
- Discipline: Road
- Role: Rider
- Rider type: Climber

Amateur teams
- 2012: Polisportiva C. Zannoni
- 2013–2014: SC Forlivese
- 2015: Calderara STM Riduttori
- 2016: Italia Nuova Borgo Panigale
- 2017–2018: Team Beltrami–Argon 18
- 2019–2021: inEmiliaRomagna Cycling Team

Professional teams
- 2021: Androni Giocattoli–Sidermec (stagiaire)
- 2022–: Bardiani–CSF–Faizanè

Manuele Tarozzi (born 20 June 1998) is an Italian racing cyclist, who currently rides for UCI ProTeam Bardiani–CSF 7 Saber.

== Major results ==
2019
1st Giro delle Valli Aretine
1st Piccolo Giro dell'Emilia
1st Stage 9 Tour de Nouvelle-Calédonie
10th Giro del Medio Brenta
2021
1st Giro delle Due Province
2023 (1 pro win)
1st Stage 7 Tour du Rwanda
1st Mountains classification, Vuelta a San Juan
2024 (1)
1st Mountains classification, Settimana Internazionale di Coppi e Bartali
3rd Overall Tour of Qinghai Lake

1st Stage 3

2025
1st Mountains classification, Tirreno–Adriatico

=== Grand Tour general classification results timeline ===
Grand Tour	2024
Giro d'Italia	102
Tour de France	—
Vuelta a España	—

Legend
—	Did not compete
DNF	Did not finish
