= 2026 Vuelta a Burgos =

Men's road cycling stage race

2026 UCI ProSeries

Race details
- Dates: 4–8 August 2026
- Stages: 5
- Distance: 842 km (523 mi)
- Winning time: 19h 36' 15"

Results
Jersey awarded to the overall winner	Winner	Felix Gall (AUT)	(Decathlon CMA CGM)
	Second	Oscar Onley (GBR)	(Netcompany INEOS)
	Third	Giulio Ciccone (ITA)	(Lidl–Trek)
Jersey awarded to the points classification winner	Points	Oscar Onley (GBR)	(Netcompany INEOS)
Jersey awarded to the mountains classification winner	Mountains	Oscar Onley (GBR)	(Netcompany INEOS)
Jersey awarded to the young rider classification winner	Young rider	Léo Bisiaux (FRA)	(Decathlon CMA CGM)
	Team	(Netherlands) Team Picnic–PostNL	

The 2026 Vuelta a Burgos was a men's road cycling stage race that took place from 4 to 8 August 2026 in the Spanish province of Burgos. It was the 48th edition of the Vuelta a Burgos, and was rated as a 2.Pro event as part of the 2026 UCI ProSeries calendar.

== Teams ==
Fourteen of the eighteen UCI WorldTeams were joined by eight UCI ProTeams and one UCI Continental team to make up the twenty-two teams that participated in the race.

UCI WorldTeams

- Decathlon CMA CGM
- EF Education–EasyPost
- Groupama–FDJ United
- Lidl–Trek
- Lotto–Intermarché
- Movistar Team
- Netcompany INEOS
- Red Bull–Bora–Hansgrohe
- Soudal–Quick-Step
- Team Bahrain Victorious
- Team Picnic–PostNL
- UAE Team Emirates XRG
- Visma–Lease a Bike
- XDS Astana Team

UCI ProTeams

- Burgos Burpellet BH
- Caja Rural–Seguros RGA
- Cofidis
- Equipo Kern Pharma
- Euskaltel–Euskadi
- Pinarello–Q36.5 Pro Cycling Team
- Team TotalEnergies
- Tudor Pro Cycling Team

== Route ==
Stage characteristics and winners
Stage	Date	Course	Distance	Type	Stage winner
1	4 August	Gumiel de Izán to Burgos (Alto del Castillo)	165 km (103 mi)	Hilly stage	Matthew Brennan (GBR)
2	5 August	Arcos de la Llana to Pineda de la Sierra	178 km (111 mi)	Medium-mountain stage	Oscar Onley (GBR)
3	6 August	Excavaciones Mikel (Merindad de Montija) to Balneario de Corconte (Valle de Valdebezana)	184 km (114 mi)	Mountain stage	Felix Gall (AUT)
4	7 August	Palazuelos de Muñó to Briviesca	178 km (111 mi)	Hilly stage	Matthew Brennan (GBR)
5	8 August	Caleruega to Lagunas de Neila	137 km (85 mi)	Mountain stage	Giulio Pellizzari (ITA)
Total			842 km (523 mi)		

== Stages ==
=== Stage 1 ===
4 August 2026 – Gumiel de Izán to Burgos (Alto del Castillo), 165 km (103 mi)

Stage 1 Result
Rank	Rider	Team	Time
1	Matthew Brennan (GBR)	Visma–Lease a Bike	3h 35' 54"
2	Ben Tulett (GBR)	Visma–Lease a Bike	+ 0"
3	Laurence Pithie (NZL)	Red Bull–Bora–Hansgrohe	+ 0"
4	Jordan Labrosse (FRA)	Decathlon CMA CGM	+ 0"
5	Bjoern Koerdt (GBR)	Team Picnic–PostNL	+ 0"
6	Dylan Teuns (BEL)	Cofidis	+ 0"
7	Léo Bisiaux (FRA)	Decathlon CMA CGM	+ 0"
8	Milan Vader (NED)	Pinarello–Q36.5 Pro Cycling Team	+ 0"
9	Bastien Tronchon (FRA)	Groupama–FDJ United	+ 0"
10	Luca Van Boven (BEL)	Lotto–Intermarché	+ 0"

General classification after Stage 1
Rank	Rider	Team	Time
1	Matthew Brennan (GBR)	Visma–Lease a Bike	3h 35' 44"
2	Ben Tulett (GBR)	Visma–Lease a Bike	+ 4"
3	Laurence Pithie (NZL)	Red Bull–Bora–Hansgrohe	+ 6"
4	Jordan Labrosse (FRA)	Decathlon CMA CGM	+ 10"
5	Bjoern Koerdt (GBR)	Team Picnic–PostNL	+ 10"
6	Dylan Teuns (BEL)	Cofidis	+ 10"
7	Léo Bisiaux (FRA)	Decathlon CMA CGM	+ 10"
8	Milan Vader (NED)	Pinarello–Q36.5 Pro Cycling Team	+ 10"
9	Bastien Tronchon (FRA)	Groupama–FDJ United	+ 10"
10	Luca Van Boven (BEL)	Lotto–Intermarché	+ 10"

=== Stage 2 ===
5 August 2026 – Arcos de la Llana to Pineda de la Sierra, 178 km (111 mi)

Stage 2 Result
Rank	Rider	Team	Time
1	Oscar Onley (GBR)	Netcompany INEOS	4h 17' 32"
2	Giulio Ciccone (ITA)	Lidl–Trek	+ 0"
3	Enric Mas (ESP)	Movistar Team	+ 2"
4	Jarno Widar (BEL)	Lotto–Intermarché	+ 3"
5	Felix Gall (AUT)	Decathlon CMA CGM	+ 3"
6	Jefferson Alexander Cepeda (ECU)	EF Education–EasyPost	+ 6"
7	Markel Beloki (ESP)	EF Education–EasyPost	+ 6"
8	Mathys Rondel (FRA)	Tudor Pro Cycling Team	+ 6"
9	Mario Aparicio (ESP)	Burgos Burpellet BH	+ 6"
10	Bjoern Koerdt (GBR)	Team Picnic–PostNL	+ 6"

General classification after Stage 2
Rank	Rider	Team	Time
1	Oscar Onley (GBR)	Netcompany INEOS	7h 53' 28"
2	Bjoern Koerdt (GBR)	Team Picnic–PostNL	+ 4"
3	Giulio Ciccone (ITA)	Lidl–Trek	+ 4"
4	Ben Tulett (GBR)	Visma–Lease a Bike	+ 5"
5	Enric Mas (ESP)	Movistar Team	+ 8"
6	Jefferson Alexander Cepeda (ECU)	EF Education–EasyPost	+ 10"
7	Mathys Rondel (FRA)	Tudor Pro Cycling Team	+ 10"
8	Léo Bisiaux (FRA)	Decathlon CMA CGM	+ 11"
9	Jarno Widar (BEL)	Lotto–Intermarché	+ 13"
10	Felix Gall (AUT)	Decathlon CMA CGM	+ 13"

=== Stage 3 ===
6 August 2026 – Excavaciones Mikel (Merindad de Montija) to Balneario de Corconte (Valle de Valdebezana), 184 km (114 mi)

Stage 3 Result
Rank	Rider	Team	Time
1	Felix Gall (AUT)	Decathlon CMA CGM	4h 24' 47"
2	Giulio Ciccone (ITA)	Lidl–Trek	+ 11"
3	Giulio Pellizzari (ITA)	Red Bull–Bora–Hansgrohe	+ 11"
4	Oscar Onley (GBR)	Netcompany INEOS	+ 11"
5	Enric Mas (ESP)	Movistar Team	+ 22"
6	Mathys Rondel (FRA)	Tudor Pro Cycling Team	+ 22"
7	Jarno Widar (BEL)	Lotto–Intermarché	+ 46"
8	Pablo Torres (ESP)	UAE Team Emirates XRG	+ 47"
9	Clément Berthet (FRA)	Groupama–FDJ United	+ 47"
10	Matteo Vanhuffel (BEL)	Team Picnic–PostNL	+ 47"

General classification after Stage 3
Rank	Rider	Team	Time
1	Felix Gall (AUT)	Decathlon CMA CGM	12h 18' 18"
2	Giulio Ciccone (ITA)	Lidl–Trek	+ 6"
3	Oscar Onley (GBR)	Netcompany INEOS	+ 8"
4	Enric Mas (ESP)	Movistar Team	+ 27"
5	Mathys Rondel (FRA)	Tudor Pro Cycling Team	+ 29"
6	Giulio Pellizzari (ITA)	Red Bull–Bora–Hansgrohe	+ 43"
7	Ben Tulett (GBR)	Visma–Lease a Bike	+ 49"
8	Léo Bisiaux (FRA)	Decathlon CMA CGM	+ 55"
9	Jarno Widar (BEL)	Lotto–Intermarché	+ 56"
10	Clément Berthet (FRA)	Groupama–FDJ United	+ 1' 00"

=== Stage 4 ===
7 August 2026 – Palazuelos de Muñó to Briviesca, 178 km (111 mi)

Stage 4 Result
Rank	Rider	Team	Time
1	Matthew Brennan (GBR)	Visma–Lease a Bike	4h 01' 12"
2	Laurence Pithie (NZL)	Red Bull–Bora–Hansgrohe	+ 0"
3	David González (ESP)	Pinarello–Q36.5 Pro Cycling Team	+ 0"
4	Iúri Leitão (POR)	Caja Rural–Seguros RGA	+ 0"
5	Marius Mayrhofer (GER)	Tudor Pro Cycling Team	+ 0"
6	Marc Brustenga (ESP)	Equipo Kern Pharma	+ 0"
7	Alexis Renard (FRA)	Cofidis	+ 0"
8	Victor Loulergue (FRA)	Groupama–FDJ United	+ 0"
9	Žak Eržen (SLO)	Team Bahrain Victorious	+ 0"
10	Hodei Muñoz (ESP)	Euskaltel–Euskadi	+ 0"

General classification after Stage 4
Rank	Rider	Team	Time
1	Felix Gall (AUT)	Decathlon CMA CGM	16h 19' 30"
2	Giulio Ciccone (ITA)	Lidl–Trek	+ 6"
3	Oscar Onley (GBR)	Netcompany INEOS	+ 7"
4	Enric Mas (ESP)	Movistar Team	+ 27"
5	Mathys Rondel (FRA)	Tudor Pro Cycling Team	+ 29"
6	Giulio Pellizzari (ITA)	Red Bull–Bora–Hansgrohe	+ 43"
7	Ben Tulett (GBR)	Visma–Lease a Bike	+ 49"
8	Léo Bisiaux (FRA)	Decathlon CMA CGM	+ 55"
9	Jarno Widar (BEL)	Lotto–Intermarché	+ 56"
10	Clément Berthet (FRA)	Groupama–FDJ United	+ 1' 00"

=== Stage 5 ===
8 August 2026 – Caleruega to Lagunas de Neila, 137 km (85 mi)

Stage 5 Result
Rank	Rider	Team	Time
1	Giulio Pellizzari (ITA)	Red Bull–Bora–Hansgrohe	3h 16' 46"
2	Oscar Onley (GBR)	Netcompany INEOS	+ 3"
3	Felix Gall (AUT)	Decathlon CMA CGM	+ 3"
4	Giulio Ciccone (ITA)	Lidl–Trek	+ 5"
5	Enric Mas (ESP)	Movistar Team	+ 13"
6	Mathys Rondel (FRA)	Tudor Pro Cycling Team	+ 20"
7	Jørgen Nordhagen (NOR)	Visma–Lease a Bike	+ 29"
8	Pablo Torres (ESP)	UAE Team Emirates XRG	+ 33"
9	Lorenzo Fortunato (ITA)	XDS Astana Team	+ 40"
10	Markel Beloki (ESP)	EF Education–EasyPost	+ 42"

General classification after Stage 5
Rank	Rider	Team	Time
1	Felix Gall (AUT)	Decathlon CMA CGM	19h 36' 15"
2	Oscar Onley (GBR)	Netcompany INEOS	+ 5"
3	Giulio Ciccone (ITA)	Lidl–Trek	+ 12"
4	Giulio Pellizzari (ITA)	Red Bull–Bora–Hansgrohe	+ 34"
5	Enric Mas (ESP)	Movistar Team	+ 41"
6	Mathys Rondel (FRA)	Tudor Pro Cycling Team	+ 50"
7	Léo Bisiaux (FRA)	Decathlon CMA CGM	+ 1' 52"
8	Markel Beloki (ESP)	EF Education–EasyPost	+ 1' 56"
9	Matteo Vanhuffel (BEL)	Team Picnic–PostNL	+ 1' 57"
10	Lorenzo Fortunato (ITA)	XDS Astana Team	+ 2' 02"

== Classification leadership table ==
Classification leadership by stage
Stage	Winner	General classification	Points classification	Mountains classification	Young rider classification	Team classification
1	Matthew Brennan	Matthew Brennan	Matthew Brennan	Matthew Brennan	Matthew Brennan	Visma–Lease a Bike
2	Oscar Onley	Oscar Onley	Oscar Onley	Rodrigo Álvarez	Bjoern Koerdt	Team Picnic–PostNL
3	Felix Gall	Felix Gall	Giulio Ciccone	Diego Uriarte	Léo Bisiaux	Team Picnic–PostNL
4	Matthew Brennan	Felix Gall	Matthew Brennan	Diego Uriarte	Léo Bisiaux	Team Picnic–PostNL
5	Giulio Pellizzari	Felix Gall	Oscar Onley	Oscar Onley	Léo Bisiaux	Team Picnic–PostNL
Final		Felix Gall	Oscar Onley	Oscar Onley	Léo Bisiaux	Team Picnic–PostNL

== Classification standings ==
Legend
Denotes the winner of the general classification	Denotes the winner of the mountains classification
Denotes the winner of the points classification	Denotes the winner of the young rider classification

=== General classification ===
Final general classification (1–10)
Rank	Rider	Team	Time
1	Felix Gall (AUT)	Decathlon CMA CGM	19h 36' 15"
2	Oscar Onley (GBR)	Netcompany INEOS	+ 5"
3	Giulio Ciccone (ITA)	Lidl–Trek	+ 12"
4	Giulio Pellizzari (ITA)	Red Bull–Bora–Hansgrohe	+ 34"
5	Enric Mas (ESP)	Movistar Team	+ 41"
6	Mathys Rondel (FRA)	Tudor Pro Cycling Team	+ 50"
7	Léo Bisiaux (FRA)	Decathlon CMA CGM	+ 1' 52"
8	Markel Beloki (ESP)	EF Education–EasyPost	+ 1' 56"
9	Matteo Vanhuffel (BEL)	Team Picnic–PostNL	+ 1' 57"
10	Lorenzo Fortunato (ITA)	XDS Astana Team	+ 2' 02"

=== Points classification ===
Final points classification (1–10)
Rank	Rider	Team	Points
1	Oscar Onley (GBR)	Netcompany INEOS	59
2	Giulio Ciccone (ITA)	Lidl–Trek	54
3	Felix Gall (AUT)	Decathlon CMA CGM	53
4	Matthew Brennan (GBR)	Visma–Lease a Bike	50
5	Giulio Pellizzari (ITA)	Red Bull–Bora–Hansgrohe	41
6	Enric Mas (ESP)	Movistar Team	40
7	Mathys Rondel (FRA)	Tudor Pro Cycling Team	28
8	Ben Tulett (GBR)	Visma–Lease a Bike	25
9	Bjoern Koerdt (GBR)	Team Picnic–PostNL	20
10	Léo Bisiaux (FRA)	Decathlon CMA CGM	17

=== Mountains classification ===
Final mountains classification (1–10)
Rank	Rider	Team	Points
1	Oscar Onley (GBR)	Netcompany INEOS	56
2	Giulio Pellizzari (ITA)	Red Bull–Bora–Hansgrohe	54
3	Felix Gall (AUT)	Decathlon CMA CGM	51
4	Giulio Ciccone (ITA)	Lidl–Trek	36
5	Diego Uriarte (ESP)	Equipo Kern Pharma	34
6	Pavel Sivakov (FRA)	UAE Team Emirates XRG	24
7	Enric Mas (ESP)	Movistar Team	24
8	Mathys Rondel (FRA)	Tudor Pro Cycling Team	22
9	Javier Ibáñez (ESP)	Caja Rural–Seguros RGA	16
10	Pablo Torres (ESP)	UAE Team Emirates XRG	14

=== Young rider classification ===
Final young rider classification (1–10)
Rank	Rider	Team	Time
1	Léo Bisiaux (FRA)	Decathlon CMA CGM	19h 38' 07"
2	Markel Beloki (ESP)	EF Education–EasyPost	+ 4"
3	Matteo Vanhuffel (BEL)	Team Picnic–PostNL	+ 5"
4	Pablo Torres (ESP)	UAE Team Emirates XRG	+ 21"
5	Jurgen Zomermaand (NED)	Team Picnic–PostNL	+ 1' 46"
6	Jørgen Nordhagen (NOR)	Visma–Lease a Bike	+ 2' 59"
7	Bjoern Koerdt (GBR)	Team Picnic–PostNL	+ 3' 38"
8	Oliver Sims (AUS)	Pinarello–Q36.5 Pro Cycling Team	+ 5' 29"
9	Niels Driesen (BEL)	Lotto–Intermarché	+ 6' 26"
10	Jasper Schoofs (BEL)	Soudal–Quick-Step	+ 7' 36"

=== Team classification ===
Final team classification (1–10)
Rank	Team	Time
1	(Netherlands) Team Picnic–PostNL	58h 56' 32"
2	(Spain) Movistar Team	+ 59"
3	(United States) EF Education–EasyPost	+ 1' 54"
4	(United Kingdom) Netcompany INEOS	+ 2' 23"
5	(France) Decathlon CMA CGM	+ 2' 29"
6	(Netherlands) Visma–Lease a Bike	+ 4' 14"
7	(United Arab Emirates) UAE Team Emirates XRG	+ 6' 24"
8	(Belgium) Soudal–Quick-Step	+ 9' 04"
9	(Germany) Red Bull–Bora–Hansgrohe	+ 11' 51"
10	(Switzerland) Tudor Pro Cycling Team	+ 13' 04"
