= 2025 Tour de Romandie =

2025 UCI World Tour, race 20 of 36

Race details
- Dates: 29 April – 4 May 2025
- Stages: 5 + Prologue
- Distance: 683.3 km (424.6 mi)
- Winning time: 16h 50' 44"

Results
Jersey awarded to the overall winner	Winner	João Almeida (POR)	(UAE Team Emirates XRG)
	Second	Lenny Martinez (FRA)	(Team Bahrain Victorious)
	Third	Jay Vine (AUS)	(UAE Team Emirates XRG)
Jersey awarded to the points classification winner	Points	Jay Vine (AUS)	(UAE Team Emirates XRG)
Jersey awarded to the mountains classification winner	Mountains	Ben Zwiehoff (GER)	(Red Bull–Bora–Hansgrohe)
Jersey awarded to the young rider classification winner	Young rider	Lenny Martinez (FRA)	(Team Bahrain Victorious)
	Team	(United Arab Emirates) UAE Team Emirates XRG	

The 2025 Tour de Romandie was a road cycling stage race held between 29 April and 4 May 2025 in Romandy, the French-speaking part of western Switzerland. It was the 78th edition of the Tour de Romandie and the 20th race of the 2025 UCI World Tour.

== Teams ==
All eighteen UCI WorldTeams and two UCI ProTeams participated in the race.

UCI WorldTeams

- Alpecin–Deceuninck
- Arkéa–B&B Hotels
- Cofidis
- Decathlon–AG2R La Mondiale
- EF Education–EasyPost
- Groupama–FDJ
- INEOS Grenadiers
- Intermarché–Wanty
- Lidl–Trek
- Movistar Team
- Red Bull–Bora–Hansgrohe
- Soudal–Quick-Step
- Team Bahrain Victorious
- Team Jayco–AlUla
- Team Picnic–PostNL
- UAE Team Emirates XRG
- Visma–Lease a Bike
- XDS Astana Team

UCI ProTeams

- Lotto
- Tudor Pro Cycling Team

== Route ==
Stage characteristics and winners
Stage	Date	Route	Distance	Type	Winner
P	29 April	Saint-Imier	3.4 km (2.1 mi)	Individual time trial	Samuel Watson (GBR)
1	30 April	Münchenstein to Fribourg	194.3 km (120.7 mi)	Hilly stage	Matthew Brennan (GBR)
2	1 May	La Grande Béroche to La Grande Béroche	157 km (98 mi)	Mountain stage	Lorenzo Fortunato (ITA)
3	2 May	Cossonay to Cossonay	183.1 km (113.8 mi)	Mountain stage	Jay Vine (AUS)
4	3 May	Sion to Thyon 2000	128.4 km (79.8 mi)	Mountain stage	Lenny Martinez (FRA)
5	4 May	Genève to Genève	17.1 km (10.6 mi)	Individual time trial	Remco Evenepoel (BEL)
Total			683.3 km (424.6 mi)		

== Stages ==
=== Prologue ===
29 April 2025 — Saint-Imier, 3.4 kilometres (2.1 mi) (ITT)

Prologue result
Rank	Rider	Team	Time
1	Samuel Watson (GBR)	INEOS Grenadiers	4' 33"
2	Ivo Oliveira (POR)	UAE Team Emirates XRG	+ 0"
3	Iván Romeo (ESP)	Movistar Team	+ 3"
4	Stefan Bissegger (SUI)	Decathlon–AG2R La Mondiale	+ 3"
5	Maikel Zijlaard (NED)	Tudor Pro Cycling Team	+ 3"
6	Stefan Küng (SUI)	Groupama–FDJ	+ 4"
7	Thibault Guernalec (FRA)	Arkéa–B&B Hotels	+ 4"
8	Remco Evenepoel (BEL)	Soudal–Quick-Step	+ 4"
9	Jay Vine (AUS)	UAE Team Emirates XRG	+ 5"
10	Jan Christen (SUI)	UAE Team Emirates XRG	+ 5"

General classification after prologue
Rank	Rider	Team	Time
1	Samuel Watson (GBR)	INEOS Grenadiers	4' 33"
2	Ivo Oliveira (POR)	UAE Team Emirates XRG	+ 0"
3	Iván Romeo (ESP)	Movistar Team	+ 3"
4	Stefan Bissegger (SUI)	Decathlon–AG2R La Mondiale	+ 3"
5	Maikel Zijlaard (NED)	Tudor Pro Cycling Team	+ 3"
6	Stefan Küng (SUI)	Groupama–FDJ	+ 4"
7	Thibault Guernalec (FRA)	Arkéa–B&B Hotels	+ 4"
8	Remco Evenepoel (BEL)	Soudal–Quick-Step	+ 4"
9	Jay Vine (AUS)	UAE Team Emirates XRG	+ 5"
10	Jan Christen (SUI)	UAE Team Emirates XRG	+ 5"

=== Stage 1 ===
30 April 2025 — Château d'Oex to Fribourg, 194.3 kilometres (120.7 mi)

Stage 1 result
Rank	Rider	Team	Time
1	Matthew Brennan (GBR)	Visma–Lease a Bike	4h 42' 32"
2	Aurélien Paret-Peintre (FRA)	Decathlon–AG2R La Mondiale	+ 0"
3	Artem Shmidt (USA)	INEOS Grenadiers	+ 0"
4	Huub Artz (NED)	Intermarché–Wanty	+ 0"
5	Clément Venturini (FRA)	Arkéa–B&B Hotels	+ 0"
6	Oscar Onley (GBR)	Team Picnic–PostNL	+ 0"
7	Clément Champoussin (FRA)	XDS Astana Team	+ 0"
8	Milan Menten (BEL)	Lotto	+ 0"
9	Ramses Debruyne (BEL)	Alpecin–Deceuninck	+ 0"
10	Ben Swift (GBR)	INEOS Grenadiers	+ 0"

General classification after stage 1
Rank	Rider	Team	Time
1	Matthew Brennan (GBR)	Visma–Lease a Bike	4h 47' 02"
2	Samuel Watson (GBR)	INEOS Grenadiers	+ 3"
3	Ivo Oliveira (POR)	UAE Team Emirates XRG	+ 3"
4	Artem Shmidt (USA)	INEOS Grenadiers	+ 5"
5	Iván Romeo (ESP)	Movistar Team	+ 6"
6	Stefan Küng (SUI)	Groupama–FDJ	+ 7"
7	Thibault Guernalec (FRA)	Arkéa–B&B Hotels	+ 7"
8	Aurélien Paret-Peintre (FRA)	Decathlon–AG2R La Mondiale	+ 7"
9	Remco Evenepoel (BEL)	Soudal–Quick-Step	+ 7"
10	Jay Vine (AUS)	UAE Team Emirates XRG	+ 8"

=== Stage 2 ===
1 May 2025 — La Grande Béroche to La Grande Béroche, 157 kilometres (98 mi)

Stage 2 result
Rank	Rider	Team	Time
1	Lorenzo Fortunato (ITA)	XDS Astana Team	3h 54' 40"
2	Alex Baudin (FRA)	EF Education–EasyPost	+ 2"
3	Junior Lecerf (BEL)	Soudal–Quick-Step	+ 2"
4	Lennert Van Eetvelt (BEL)	Lotto	+ 2"
5	Juan Pedro López (ESP)	Lidl–Trek	+ 2"
6	Remco Evenepoel (BEL)	Soudal–Quick-Step	+ 56"
7	Harold Tejada (COL)	XDS Astana Team	+ 56"
8	Javier Romo (ESP)	Movistar Team	+ 56"
9	Cristián Rodríguez (ESP)	Arkéa–B&B Hotels	+ 56"
10	Eddie Dunbar (IRL)	Team Jayco–AlUla	+ 56"

General classification after stage 2
Rank	Rider	Team	Time
1	Alex Baudin (FRA)	EF Education–EasyPost	8h 41' 53"
2	Junior Lecerf (BEL)	Soudal–Quick-Step	+ 5"
3	Lennert Van Eetvelt (BEL)	Lotto	+ 6"
4	Lorenzo Fortunato (ITA)	XDS Astana Team	+ 17"
5	Juan Pedro López (ESP)	Lidl–Trek	+ 17"
6	Remco Evenepoel (BEL)	Soudal–Quick-Step	+ 52"
7	Jay Vine (AUS)	UAE Team Emirates XRG	+ 53"
8	João Almeida (POR)	UAE Team Emirates XRG	+ 53"
9	Lenny Martinez (FRA)	Team Bahrain Victorious	+ 56"
10	Harold Tejada (COL)	XDS Astana Team	+ 56"

=== Stage 3 ===
2 May 2025 — Cossonay to Cossonay, 183.1 kilometres (113.8 mi)

Stage 3 result
Rank	Rider	Team	Time
1	Jay Vine (AUS)	UAE Team Emirates XRG	4h 03' 35"
2	Lenny Martinez (FRA)	Team Bahrain Victorious	+ 2"
3	João Almeida (POR)	UAE Team Emirates XRG	+ 2"
4	Louis Barré (FRA)	Intermarché–Wanty	+ 2"
5	Alberto Bettiol (ITA)	XDS Astana Team	+ 2"
6	Javier Romo (ESP)	Movistar Team	+ 2"
7	Remco Evenepoel (BEL)	Soudal–Quick-Step	+ 2"
8	Aurélien Paret-Peintre (FRA)	Decathlon–AG2R La Mondiale	+ 2"
9	Oscar Onley (GBR)	Team Picnic–PostNL	+ 2"
10	Mathys Rondel (FRA)	Tudor Pro Cycling Team	+ 2"

General classification after stage 3
Rank	Rider	Team	Time
1	Alex Baudin (FRA)	EF Education–EasyPost	12h 45' 30"
2	Junior Lecerf (BEL)	Soudal–Quick-Step	+ 5"
3	Lennert Van Eetvelt (BEL)	Lotto	+ 6"
4	Lorenzo Fortunato (ITA)	XDS Astana Team	+ 17"
5	Juan Pedro López (ESP)	Lidl–Trek	+ 17"
6	Jay Vine (AUS)	UAE Team Emirates XRG	+ 41"
7	João Almeida (POR)	UAE Team Emirates XRG	+ 49"
8	Lenny Martinez (FRA)	Team Bahrain Victorious	+ 50"
9	Remco Evenepoel (BEL)	Soudal–Quick-Step	+ 52"
10	Harold Tejada (COL)	XDS Astana Team	+ 56"

=== Stage 4 ===
3 May 2025 — Sion to Thyon 2000, 128.4 kilometres (79.8 mi)

Stage 4 result
Rank	Rider	Team	Time
1	Lenny Martinez (FRA)	Team Bahrain Victorious	3h 43' 46"
2	João Almeida (POR)	UAE Team Emirates XRG	+ 0"
3	Lorenzo Fortunato (ITA)	XDS Astana Team	+ 29"
4	Jay Vine (AUS)	Arkéa–B&B Hotels	+ 31"
5	Carlos Rodríguez (ESP)	INEOS Grenadiers	+ 31"
6	Cristián Rodríguez (ESP)	Arkéa–B&B Hotels	+ 1' 11"
7	Mathys Rondel (FRA)	Tudor Pro Cycling Team	+ 1' 13"
8	Jørgen Nordhagen (NOR)	Visma–Lease a Bike	+ 1' 17"
9	Sergio Higuita (COL)	XDS Astana Team	+ 1' 29"
10	Junior Lecerf (BEL)	Soudal–Quick-Step	+ 1' 29"

General classification after stage 4
Rank	Rider	Team	Time
1	Lenny Martinez (FRA)	Team Bahrain Victorious	16h 29' 56"
2	Lorenzo Fortunato (ITA)	XDS Astana Team	+ 2"
3	João Almeida (POR)	UAE Team Emirates XRG	+ 3"
4	Jay Vine (AUS)	UAE Team Emirates XRG	+ 32"
5	Junior Lecerf (BEL)	Soudal–Quick-Step	+ 54"
6	Carlos Rodríguez (ESP)	INEOS Grenadiers	+ 54"
7	Juan Pedro López (ESP)	Lidl–Trek	+ 1' 06"
8	Mathys Rondel (FRA)	Tudor Pro Cycling Team	+ 1' 37"
9	Remco Evenepoel (BEL)	Soudal–Quick-Step	+ 1' 41"
10	Cristián Rodríguez (ESP)	Arkéa–B&B Hotels	+ 1' 46"

=== Stage 5 ===
4 May 2025 — Genève to Genève, 17.1 kilometres (10.6 mi) (ITT)

Stage 5 result
Rank	Rider	Team	Time
1	Remco Evenepoel (BEL)	Soudal–Quick-Step	20' 33"
2	João Almeida (POR)	UAE Team Emirates XRG	+ 12"
3	Alberto Bettiol (ITA)	XDS Astana Team	+ 18"
4	Jay Vine (AUS)	Arkéa–B&B Hotels	+ 24"
5	Aleksandr Vlasov	Red Bull–Bora–Hansgrohe	+ 27"
6	Raúl García Pierna (ESP)	Arkéa–B&B Hotels	+ 32"
7	Thibault Guernalec (FRA)	Arkéa–B&B Hotels	+ 33"
8	Johan Price-Pejtersen (DEN)	Alpecin–Deceuninck	+ 38"
9	Rémi Cavagna (FRA)	Groupama–FDJ	+ 39"
10	Stefan Küng (SUI)	Groupama–FDJ	+ 39"

General classification after stage 5
Rank	Rider	Team	Time
1	João Almeida (POR)	UAE Team Emirates XRG	16h 50' 44"
2	Lenny Martinez (FRA)	Team Bahrain Victorious	+ 26"
3	Jay Vine (AUS)	UAE Team Emirates XRG	+ 41"
4	Lorenzo Fortunato (ITA)	XDS Astana Team	+ 1' 22"
5	Remco Evenepoel (BEL)	Soudal–Quick-Step	+ 1' 26"
6	Carlos Rodríguez (ESP)	INEOS Grenadiers	+ 1' 31"
7	Juan Pedro López (ESP)	Lidl–Trek	+ 2' 05"
8	Junior Lecerf (BEL)	Soudal–Quick-Step	+ 2' 16"
9	Mathys Rondel (FRA)	Tudor Pro Cycling Team	+ 2' 43"
10	Javier Romo (ESP)	Movistar Team	+ 2' 58"

== Classification leadership table ==
Classification leadership by stage
Stage	Winner	General classification	Points classification	Mountains classification	Young rider classification	Team classification	Combativity award
P	Samuel Watson	Samuel Watson	Samuel Watson	Not awarded	Samuel Watson	UAE Team Emirates XRG	not awarded
1	Matthew Brennan	Matthew Brennan	Matthew Brennan	Ben Zwiehoff	Matthew Brennan	UAE Team Emirates XRG	Gerben Kuypers
2	Lorenzo Fortunato	Alex Baudin	Matthew Brennan	Ben Zwiehoff	Alex Baudin	XDS Astana Team	Juan Pedro López
3	Jay Vine	Alex Baudin	Jay Vine	Ben Zwiehoff	Alex Baudin	XDS Astana Team	Stefan Küng
4	Lenny Martinez	Lenny Martinez	Jay Vine	Ben Zwiehoff	Lenny Martinez	XDS Astana Team	Louis Barré
5	Remco Evenepoel	João Almeida	Jay Vine	Ben Zwiehoff	Lenny Martinez	UAE Team Emirates XRG	not awarded
Final		João Almeida	Jay Vine	Ben Zwiehoff	Lenny Martinez	UAE Team Emirates XRG	Remco Evenepoel

== Classification standings ==
Legend
Denotes the winner of the general classification	Denotes the winner of the young rider classification
Denotes the winner of the points classification	Denotes the winner of the combativity award
Denotes the winner of the mountains classification	

=== General classification ===
Final general classification (1–10)
Rank	Rider	Team	Time
1	João Almeida (POR)	UAE Team Emirates XRG	16h 50' 44"
2	Lenny Martinez (FRA)	Team Bahrain Victorious	+ 26"
3	Jay Vine (AUS)	UAE Team Emirates XRG	+ 41"
4	Lorenzo Fortunato (ITA)	XDS Astana Team	+ 1' 22"
5	Remco Evenepoel (BEL)	Soudal–Quick-Step	+ 1' 26"
6	Carlos Rodríguez (ESP)	INEOS Grenadiers	+ 1' 31"
7	Juan Pedro López (ESP)	Lidl–Trek	+ 2' 05"
8	Junior Lecerf (BEL)	Soudal–Quick-Step	+ 2' 16"
9	Mathys Rondel (FRA)	Tudor Pro Cycling Team	+ 2' 43"
10	Javier Romo (ESP)	Movistar Team	+ 2' 58"

=== Points classification ===
Final points classification (1–10)
Rank	Rider	Team	Points
1	Jay Vine (AUS)	UAE Team Emirates XRG	97
2	João Almeida (POR)	UAE Team Emirates XRG	81
3	Remco Evenepoel (BEL)	Soudal–Quick-Step	73
4	Lorenzo Fortunato (ITA)	XDS Astana Team	72
5	Lenny Martinez (FRA)	Team Bahrain Victorious	68
6	Matthew Brennan (GBR)	Visma–Lease a Bike	58
7	Stefan Küng (SUI)	Groupama–FDJ	52
8	Julien Bernard (FRA)	Lidl–Trek	45
9	Alex Baudin (FRA)	EF Education–EasyPost	45
10	Junior Lecerf (BEL)	Soudal–Quick-Step	42

=== Mountains classification ===
Final mountains classification (1–10)
Rank	Rider	Team	Points
1	Ben Zwiehoff (GER)	Red Bull–Bora–Hansgrohe	87
2	Julien Bernard (FRA)	Lidl–Trek	35
3	Stefan Küng (SUI)	Groupama–FDJ	25
4	Hugh Carthy (GBR)	EF Education–EasyPost	23
5	Gerben Kuypers (BEL)	Intermarché–Wanty	20
6	Louis Barré (FRA)	Intermarché–Wanty	20
7	João Almeida (POR)	UAE Team Emirates XRG	19
8	Lenny Martinez (FRA)	Team Bahrain Victorious	10
9	Amanuel Ghebreigzabhier (ERI)	Lidl–Trek	8
10	Enzo Paleni (FRA)	Groupama–FDJ	7

=== Young rider classification ===
Final young rider classification (1–10)
Rank	Rider	Team	Time
1	Lenny Martinez (FRA)	Team Bahrain Victorious	16h 51' 10"
2	Remco Evenepoel (BEL)	Soudal–Quick-Step	+ 1' 00"
3	Carlos Rodríguez (ESP)	INEOS Grenadiers	+ 1' 05"
4	Junior Lecerf (BEL)	Soudal–Quick-Step	+ 1' 50"
5	Mathys Rondel (FRA)	Tudor Pro Cycling Team	+ 2' 17"
6	Johannes Staune-Mittet (NOR)	Decathlon–AG2R La Mondiale	+ 2' 50"
7	Jørgen Nordhagen (NOR)	Visma–Lease a Bike	+ 3' 15"
8	Lennert Van Eetvelt (BEL)	Lotto	+ 3' 32"
9	Oscar Onley (GBR)	Team Picnic–PostNL	+ 3' 38"
10	Pablo Torres (ESP)	UAE Team Emirates XRG	+ 6' 11"

=== Team classification ===
Final team classification (1–10)
Rank	Team	Time
1	(United Arab Emirates) UAE Team Emirates XRG	50h 39' 18"
2	(Kazakhstan) XDS Astana Team	+ 13"
3	(France) Decathlon–AG2R La Mondiale	+ 10' 38"
4	(United States) Lidl–Trek	+ 13' 54"
5	(United Kingdom) INEOS Grenadiers	+ 14' 52"
6	(Belgium) Lotto	+ 16' 54"
7	(Australia) Team Jayco–AlUla	+ 19' 46"
8	Team Bahrain Victorious	+ 20' 01"
9	(Belgium) Soudal–Quick-Step	+ 20' 59"
10	(United States) EF Education–EasyPost	+ 23' 50"
