= 2025 Volta a Catalunya =

Spanish cycling race

2025 UCI World Tour, race 9 of 36

Race details
- Dates: 24–30 March 2025
- Stages: 7
- Distance: 1,095.1 km (680.5 mi)
- Winning time: 24h 46' 21"

Results
Jersey awarded to the overall winner	Winner	Primož Roglič (SLO)	(Red Bull–Bora–Hansgrohe)
	Second	Juan Ayuso (ESP)	(UAE Team Emirates XRG)
	Third	Enric Mas (ESP)	(Movistar Team)
Jersey awarded to the points classification winner	Points	Primož Roglič (SLO)	(Red Bull–Bora–Hansgrohe)
Jersey awarded to the mountains classification winner	Mountains	Primož Roglič (SLO)	(Red Bull–Bora–Hansgrohe)
Jersey awarded to the youth classification winner	Youth	Juan Ayuso (ESP)	(UAE Team Emirates XRG)
Jersey awarded to the team classification winner	Team	(Netherlands) Visma–Lease a Bike	

The 2025 Volta a Catalunya was a road cycling stage race that took place between 24 and 30 March. It was the 104th edition of the Volta a Catalunya.

== Teams ==
All eighteen UCI WorldTeams and six UCI ProTeams made up the twenty-four teams that participated in the race.

UCI WorldTeams

- Alpecin–Deceuninck
- Arkéa–B&B Hotels
- Cofidis
- Decathlon–AG2R La Mondiale
- EF Education–EasyPost
- Groupama–FDJ
- Ineos Grenadiers
- Intermarché–Wanty
- Lidl–Trek
- Movistar Team
- Red Bull–Bora–Hansgrohe
- Soudal–Quick-Step
- Team Bahrain Victorious
- Team Picnic PostNL
- Team Jayco–AlUla
- UAE Team Emirates XRG
- Visma–Lease a Bike
- XDS Astana Team

UCI ProTeams

- Burgos Burpellet BH
- Caja Rural–Seguros RGA
- Equipo Kern Pharma
- Euskaltel–Euskadi
- Israel–Premier Tech
- Lotto

== Route ==
Stage characteristics and winners
Stage	Date	Course	Distance	Type	Winner
1	24 March	Sant Feliu de Guíxols to Sant Feliu de Guíxols	178.3 km (110.8 mi)	Hilly stage	Matthew Brennan (GBR)
2	25 March	Banyoles to Figueres	177.3 km (110.2 mi)	Flat stage	Ethan Vernon (GBR)
3	26 March	Viladecans The Style Outlets to La Molina	218.6 km (135.8 mi)	Mountain stage	Juan Ayuso (ESP)
4	27 March	Sant Vicenç de Castellet to Montserrat Mil·lenari	188.7 km (117.3 mi)	Mountain stage	Primož Roglič (SLO)
5	28 March	Paüls to Amposta	172 km (107 mi)	Flat stage	Matthew Brennan (GBR)
6	29 March	Berga to ~~Queralt~~ Berga	~~159 km (99 mi)~~ 72 km (45 mi)	Mountain stage	Quinn Simmons (USA)
7	30 March	Barcelona to Barcelona	88.2 km (54.8 mi)	Hilly stage	Primož Roglič (SLO)
Total			~~1,182.1 km (734.5 mi)~~ 1,095.1 km (680.5 mi)		

== Stages ==
=== Stage 1 ===
24 March 2025 — Sant Feliu de Guíxols to Sant Feliu de Guíxols, 178.3 km (110.8 mi)

Stage 1 Result (1–10)
Rank	Rider	Team	Time
1	Matthew Brennan (GBR)	Visma–Lease a Bike	4h 25' 17"
2	Kaden Groves (AUS)	Alpecin–Deceuninck	+ 0"
3	Tibor Del Grosso (NED)	Alpecin–Deceuninck	+ 0"
4	Dorian Godon (FRA)	Decathlon–AG2R La Mondiale	+ 0"
5	Andrea Vendrame (ITA)	Decathlon–AG2R La Mondiale	+ 0"
6	Corbin Strong (NZL)	Israel–Premier Tech	+ 0"
7	Edward Planckaert (BEL)	Alpecin–Deceuninck	+ 0"
8	Mikel Landa (ESP)	Soudal–Quick-Step	+ 0"
9	Lennert Van Eetvelt (BEL)	Lotto	+ 0"
10	Laurens De Plus (BEL)	Ineos Grenadiers	+ 0"

General classification after Stage 1 (1–10)
Rank	Rider	Team	Time
1	Matthew Brennan (GBR)	Visma–Lease a Bike	4h 25' 07"
2	Kaden Groves (AUS)	Alpecin–Deceuninck	+ 4"
3	Tibor Del Grosso (NED)	Alpecin–Deceuninck	+ 6"
4	Enric Mas (ESP)	Movistar Team	+ 7"
5	Primož Roglič (SLO)	Red Bull–Bora–Hansgrohe	+ 9"
6	Dorian Godon (FRA)	Decathlon–AG2R La Mondiale	+ 10"
7	Andrea Vendrame (ITA)	Decathlon–AG2R La Mondiale	+ 10"
8	Corbin Strong (NZL)	Israel–Premier Tech	+ 10"
9	Edward Planckaert (BEL)	Alpecin–Deceuninck	+ 10"
10	Mikel Landa (ESP)	Soudal–Quick-Step	+ 10"

=== Stage 2 ===
25 March 2025 — Banyoles to Figueres, 177.3 km (110.2 mi)

Stage 2 Result (1–10)
Rank	Rider	Team	Time
1	Ethan Vernon (GBR)	Israel–Premier Tech	4h 16' 16"
2	Matthew Brennan (GBR)	Visma–Lease a Bike	+ 0"
3	Kaden Groves (AUS)	Alpecin–Deceuninck	+ 0"
4	Axel Laurance (FRA)	Ineos Grenadiers	+ 0"
5	Pavel Bittner (CZE)	Team Picnic PostNL	+ 0"
6	Dorian Godon (FRA)	Decathlon–AG2R La Mondiale	+ 0"
7	Marijn van den Berg (NED)	EF Education–EasyPost	+ 0"
8	Stanisław Aniołkowski (POL)	Cofidis	+ 0"
9	Dion Smith (NZL)	Intermarché–Wanty	+ 0"
10	Anders Foldager (DEN)	Team Jayco–AlUla	+ 0"

General classification after Stage 2 (1–10)
Rank	Rider	Team	Time
1	Matthew Brennan (GBR)	Visma–Lease a Bike	8h 41' 17"
2	Kaden Groves (AUS)	Alpecin–Deceuninck	+ 6"
3	Tibor Del Grosso (NED)	Alpecin–Deceuninck	+ 12"
4	Enric Mas (ESP)	Movistar Team	+ 13"
5	Juan Ayuso (ESP)	UAE Team Emirates XRG	+ 13"
6	Primož Roglič (SLO)	Red Bull–Bora–Hansgrohe	+ 15"
7	Dorian Godon (FRA)	Decathlon–AG2R La Mondiale	+ 16"
8	Andrea Vendrame (ITA)	Decathlon–AG2R La Mondiale	+ 16"
9	Junior Lecerf (BEL)	Soudal–Quick-Step	+ 16"
10	Pavel Bittner (CZE)	Team Picnic PostNL	+ 16"

=== Stage 3 ===
26 March 2025 — Viladecans The Style Outlets to La Molina, 218.6 km (135.8 mi)

Stage 3 Result (1–10)
Rank	Rider	Team	Time
1	Juan Ayuso (ESP)	UAE Team Emirates XRG	5h 49' 29"
2	Primož Roglič (SLO)	Red Bull–Bora–Hansgrohe	+ 0"
3	Mikel Landa (ESP)	Soudal–Quick-Step	+ 2"
4	Lenny Martinez (FRA)	Team Bahrain Victorious	+ 4"
5	Lennert van Eetvelt (BEL)	Lotto	+ 4"
6	Enric Mas (ESP)	Movistar Team	+ 4"
7	Egan Bernal (COL)	Ineos Grenadiers	+ 4"
8	Harold Martín López (ECU)	XDS Astana Team	+ 4"
9	Richard Carapaz (ECU)	EF Education–EasyPost	+ 4"
10	Adam Yates (GBR)	UAE Team Emirates XRG	+ 4"

General classification after Stage 3 (1–10)
Rank	Rider	Team	Time
1	Juan Ayuso (ESP)	UAE Team Emirates XRG	14h 30' 49"
2	Primož Roglič (SLO)	Red Bull–Bora–Hansgrohe	+ 6"
3	Mikel Landa (ESP)	Soudal–Quick-Step	+ 11"
4	Enric Mas (ESP)	Movistar Team	+ 14"
5	William Junior Lecerf (BEL)	Soudal–Quick-Step	+ 17"
6	Lenny Martinez (FRA)	Team Bahrain Victorious	+ 17"
7	Richard Carapaz (ECU)	EF Education–EasyPost	+ 17"
8	Laurens De Plus (BEL)	Ineos Grenadiers	+ 17"
9	Lennert van Eetvelt (BEL)	Lotto	+ 17"
10	Egan Bernal (COL)	Ineos Grenadiers	+ 17"

=== Stage 4 ===
27 March 2025 — Sant Vicenç de Castellet to Montserrat Mil·lenari, 188.7 km (117.3 mi)

Stage 4 Result (1–10)
Rank	Rider	Team	Time
1	Primož Roglič (SLO)	Red Bull–Bora–Hansgrohe	4h 24' 08"
2	Juan Ayuso (ESP)	UAE Team Emirates XRG	+ 0"
3	Enric Mas (ESP)	Movistar Team	+ 3"
4	Lenny Martinez (FRA)	Team Bahrain Victorious	+ 3"
5	Mikel Landa (ESP)	Soudal–Quick-Step	+ 3"
6	Felix Gall (AUT)	Decathlon–AG2R La Mondiale	+ 3"
7	Lennert Van Eetvelt (BEL)	Lotto	+ 3"
8	Matthew Riccitello (USA)	Israel–Premier Tech	+ 6"
9	Juan Pedro López (ESP)	Lidl–Trek	+ 21"
10	Giulio Pellizzari (ITA)	Red Bull–Bora–Hansgrohe	+ 26"

General classification after Stage 4 (1–10)
Rank	Rider	Team	Time
1	Primož Roglič (SLO)	Red Bull–Bora–Hansgrohe	18h 54' 50"
2	Juan Ayuso (ESP)	UAE Team Emirates XRG	+ 0"
3	Enric Mas (ESP)	Movistar Team	+ 20"
4	Mikel Landa (ESP)	Soudal–Quick-Step	+ 21"
5	Lenny Martinez (FRA)	Team Bahrain Victorious	+ 27"
6	Lennert van Eetvelt (BEL)	Lotto	+ 27"
7	Matthew Riccitello (USA)	Israel–Premier Tech	+ 45"
8	Harold Martín López (ECU)	XDS Astana Team	+ 55"
9	William Junior Lecerf (BEL)	Soudal–Quick-Step	+ 58"
10	Laurens De Plus (BEL)	Ineos Grenadiers	+ 58"

=== Stage 5 ===
28 March 2025 — Paüls to Amposta, 172 km (107 mi)

Stage 5 Result (1–10)
Rank	Rider	Team	Time
1	Matthew Brennan (GBR)	Visma–Lease a Bike	3h 28' 14"
2	Tibor Del Grosso (NED)	Alpecin–Deceuninck	+ 0"
3	Pavel Bittner (CZE)	Team Picnic PostNL	+ 0"
4	Marijn van den Berg (NED)	EF Education–EasyPost	+ 0"
5	Corbin Strong (NZL)	Israel–Premier Tech	+ 0"
6	Axel Laurance (FRA)	Ineos Grenadiers	+ 0"
7	Dorian Godon (FRA)	Decathlon–AG2R La Mondiale	+ 0"
8	Nico Denz (GER)	Red Bull–Bora–Hansgrohe	+ 0"
9	Eric Fagúndez (URU)	Burgos Burpellet BH	+ 0"
10	Juan Ayuso (ESP)	UAE Team Emirates XRG	+ 0"

General classification after Stage 5 (1–10)
Rank	Rider	Team	Time
1	Juan Ayuso (ESP)	UAE Team Emirates XRG	22h 23' 03"
2	Primož Roglič (SLO)	Red Bull–Bora–Hansgrohe	+ 1"
3	Enric Mas (ESP)	Movistar Team	+ 21"
4	Mikel Landa (ESP)	Soudal–Quick-Step	+ 22"
5	Lenny Martinez (FRA)	Team Bahrain Victorious	+ 28"
6	Laurens De Plus (BEL)	Ineos Grenadiers	+ 59"
7	Egan Bernal (COL)	Ineos Grenadiers	+ 59"
8	Lennert van Eetvelt (BEL)	Lotto	+ 1' 10"
9	Simon Yates (GBR)	Visma–Lease a Bike	+ 1' 14"
10	Richard Carapaz (ECU)	EF Education–EasyPost	+ 1' 27"

=== Stage 6 ===
29 March 2025 — Berga to Berga, 72 km (45 mi)

Stage 6 Result (1–10)
Rank	Rider	Team	Time
1	Quinn Simmons (USA)	Lidl–Trek	25' 04"
2	Pavel Bittner (CZE)	Team Picnic PostNL	+ 0"
3	Anders Foldager (DEN)	Team Jayco–AlUla	+ 0"
4	Lennert Van Eetvelt (BEL)	Lotto	+ 0"
5	Ethan Vernon (GBR)	Israel–Premier Tech	+ 0"
6	Andrea Vendrame (ITA)	Decathlon–AG2R La Mondiale	+ 0"
7	Dorian Godon (FRA)	Decathlon–AG2R La Mondiale	+ 0"
8	Axel Laurence (FRA)	Ineos Grenadiers	+ 0"
9	Pau Miquel (ESP)	Caja Rural–Seguros RGA	+ 0"
10	Harold Martín López (ECU)	XDS Astana Team	+ 0"

General classification after Stage 6 (1–10)
Rank	Rider	Team	Time
1	Juan Ayuso (ESP)	UAE Team Emirates XRG	22h 48' 07"
2	Primož Roglič (SLO)	Red Bull–Bora–Hansgrohe	+ 1"
3	Enric Mas (ESP)	Movistar Team	+ 21"
4	Mikel Landa (ESP)	Soudal–Quick-Step	+ 22"
5	Lenny Martinez (FRA)	Team Bahrain Victorious	+ 28"
6	Laurens De Plus (BEL)	Ineos Grenadiers	+ 59"
7	Egan Bernal (COL)	Ineos Grenadiers	+ 59"
8	Lennert van Eetvelt (BEL)	Lotto	+ 1' 10"
9	Simon Yates (GBR)	Visma–Lease a Bike	+ 1' 14"
10	Richard Carapaz (ECU)	EF Education–EasyPost	+ 1' 27"

=== Stage 7 ===
30 March 2025 — Barcelona to Barcelona, 88.2 km (54.8 mi)

Stage 7 Result (1–10)
Rank	Rider	Team	Time
1	Primož Roglič (SLO)	Red Bull–Bora–Hansgrohe	1h 58' 27"
2	Laurens De Plus (BEL)	Ineos Grenadiers	+ 14"
3	Lennert Van Eetvelt (BEL)	Lotto	+ 14"
4	Dorian Godon (FRA)	Decathlon–AG2R La Mondiale	+ 19"
5	Sylvain Moniquet (BEL)	Cofidis	+ 19"
6	Lorenzo Fortunato (ITA)	XDS Astana Team	+ 19"
7	Corbin Strong (NZL)	Israel–Premier Tech	+ 19"
8	Simon Yates (GBR)	Visma–Lease a Bike	+ 19"
9	Axel Laurance (FRA)	Ineos Grenadiers	+ 19"
10	Rudy Molard (FRA)	Groupama–FDJ	+ 19"

General classification after Stage 7 (1–10)
Rank	Rider	Team	Time
1	Primož Roglič (SLO)	Red Bull–Bora–Hansgrohe	24h 46' 21"
2	Juan Ayuso (ESP)	UAE Team Emirates XRG	+ 28"
3	Enric Mas (ESP)	Movistar Team	+ 53"
4	Mikel Landa (ESP)	Soudal–Quick-Step	+ 54"
5	Lenny Martinez (FRA)	Team Bahrain Victorious	+ 1' 00"
6	Laurens De Plus (BEL)	Ineos Grenadiers	+ 1' 20"
7	Egan Bernal (COL)	Ineos Grenadiers	+ 1' 31"
8	Lennert van Eetvelt (BEL)	Lotto	+ 1' 33"
9	Simon Yates (GBR)	Visma–Lease a Bike	+ 1' 46"
10	Richard Carapaz (ECU)	EF Education–EasyPost	+ 1' 59"

== Classification leadership table ==
Classification leadership by stage
Stage	Winner	General classification	Points classification	Mountains classification	Young rider classification	Team classification	Combativity award
1	Matthew Brennan	Matthew Brennan	Matthew Brennan	Danny van der Tuuk	Matthew Brennan	Alpecin–Deceuninck	Jan Castellon
2	Ethan Vernon	Matthew Brennan	Matthew Brennan	Danny van der Tuuk	Matthew Brennan	Alpecin–Deceuninck	Diego Uriarte
3	Juan Ayuso	Juan Ayuso	Matthew Brennan	Bruno Armirail	Juan Ayuso	Visma–Lease a Bike	Alex Molenaar
4	Primož Roglič	Primož Roglič	Primož Roglič	Bruno Armirail	Juan Ayuso	XDS Astana Team	Eric Fagúndez
5	Matthew Brennan	Juan Ayuso	Matthew Brennan	Bruno Armirail	Juan Ayuso	Visma–Lease a Bike	Jokin Murguialday
6	Quinn Simmons	Juan Ayuso	Juan Ayuso	Bruno Armirail	Juan Ayuso	Visma–Lease a Bike	Carlos Verona
7	Primož Roglič	Primož Roglič	Primož Roglič	Primož Roglič	Juan Ayuso	Visma–Lease a Bike	Mats Wenzel
Final		Primož Roglič	Primož Roglič	Primož Roglič	Juan Ayuso	Visma–Lease a Bike	Not awarded

== Classification standings ==
Legend
Denotes the winner of the general classification	Denotes the winner of the young rider classification
Denotes the winner of the points classification	Denotes the winner of the team classification
Denotes the winner of the mountains classification	Denotes the winner of the combativity award

=== General classification ===
Final general classification (1–10)
Rank	Rider	Team	Time
1	Primož Roglič (SLO)	Red Bull–Bora–Hansgrohe	24h 46' 21"
2	Juan Ayuso (ESP)	UAE Team Emirates XRG	+ 28"
3	Enric Mas (ESP)	Movistar Team	+ 53"
4	Mikel Landa (ESP)	Soudal–Quick-Step	+ 54"
5	Lenny Martinez (FRA)	Team Bahrain Victorious	+ 1' 00"
6	Laurens De Plus (BEL)	Ineos Grenadiers	+ 1' 20"
7	Egan Bernal (COL)	Ineos Grenadiers	+ 1' 31"
8	Lennert Van Eetvelt (BEL)	Lotto	+ 1' 33"
9	Simon Yates (GBR)	Visma–Lease a Bike	+ 1' 46"
10	Richard Carapaz (ECU)	EF Education–EasyPost	+ 1' 59"

=== Points classification ===
Final points classification (1–10)
Rank	Rider	Team	Points
1	Primož Roglič (SLO)	Red Bull–Bora–Hansgrohe	34
2	Juan Ayuso (ESP)	UAE Team Emirates XRG	25
3	Quinn Simmons (USA)	Lidl–Trek	10
4	Ethan Vernon (GBR)	Israel–Premier Tech	10
5	Pavel Bittner (CZE)	Team Picnic PostNL	10
6	Diego Uriarte (ESP)	Equipo Kern Pharma	8
7	Enric Mas (ESP)	Movistar Team	7
8	Mats Wenzel (LUX)	Equipo Kern Pharma	6
9	Jan Castellon (ESP)	Caja Rural–Seguros RGA	6
10	Laurens De Plus (BEL)	Ineos Grenadiers	6

=== Mountains classification ===
Final mountains classification (1–10)
Rank	Rider	Team	Points
1	Primož Roglič (SLO)	Red Bull–Bora–Hansgrohe	36
2	Mats Wenzel (LUX)	Equipo Kern Pharma	36
3	Bruno Armirail (FRA)	Groupama–FDJ	33
4	Juan Ayuso (ESP)	UAE Team Emirates XRG	22
5	Alex Molenaar (NED)	Caja Rural–Seguros RGA	18
6	Danny van der Tuuk (POL)	Euskaltel–Euskadi	16
7	Lorenzo Germani (ITA)	Groupama–FDJ	16
8	Mario Aparicio (ESP)	Burgos Burpellet BH	12
9	Pablo Torres (ESP)	UAE Team Emirates XRG	12
10	Enric Mas (ESP)	Movistar Team	9

=== Young rider classification ===
Final young rider classification (1–10)
Rank	Rider	Team	Time
1	Juan Ayuso (ESP)	UAE Team Emirates XRG	24h 46' 49"
2	Lenny Martinez (FRA)	Team Bahrain Victorious	+ 32"
3	Matthew Riccitello (USA)	Israel–Premier Tech	+ 1' 32"
4	William Junior Lecerf (BEL)	Soudal–Quick-Step	+ 1' 45"
5	Giulio Pellizzari (ITA)	Red Bull–Bora–Hansgrohe	+ 1' 52"
6	Pablo Torres (ESP)	UAE Team Emirates XRG	+ 7' 38"
7	Jaume Guardeño (ESP)	Caja Rural–Seguros RGA	+ 9' 51"
8	Brieuc Rolland (FRA)	Groupama–FDJ	+ 11' 01"
9	Embret Svestad-Bårdseng (NOR)	Arkéa–B&B Hotels	+ 12' 06"
10	Gianmarco Garofoli (ITA)	Soudal–Quick-Step	+ 19' 23"

=== Team classification ===
Final teams classification (1–10)
Rank	Team	Time
1	(Netherlands) Visma–Lease a Bike	74h 26' 13"
2	(Kazakhstan) XDS Astana Team	+ 48"
3	(Germany) Red Bull–Bora–Hansgrohe	+ 1' 58"
4	(United Kingdom) Ineos Grenadiers	+ 3' 47"
5	(United Arab Emirates) UAE Team Emirates XRG	+ 5' 38"
6	(Spain) Burgos Burpellet BH	+ 7' 12"
7	(Belgium) Soudal–Quick-Step	+ 8' 14"
8	(France) Decathlon–AG2R La Mondiale	+ 11' 13"
9	(United States) EF Education–EasyPost	+ 17' 39"
10	(United States) Lidl–Trek	+ 19' 28"
