= Dillon Corkery =

Irish cyclist (born 1999)

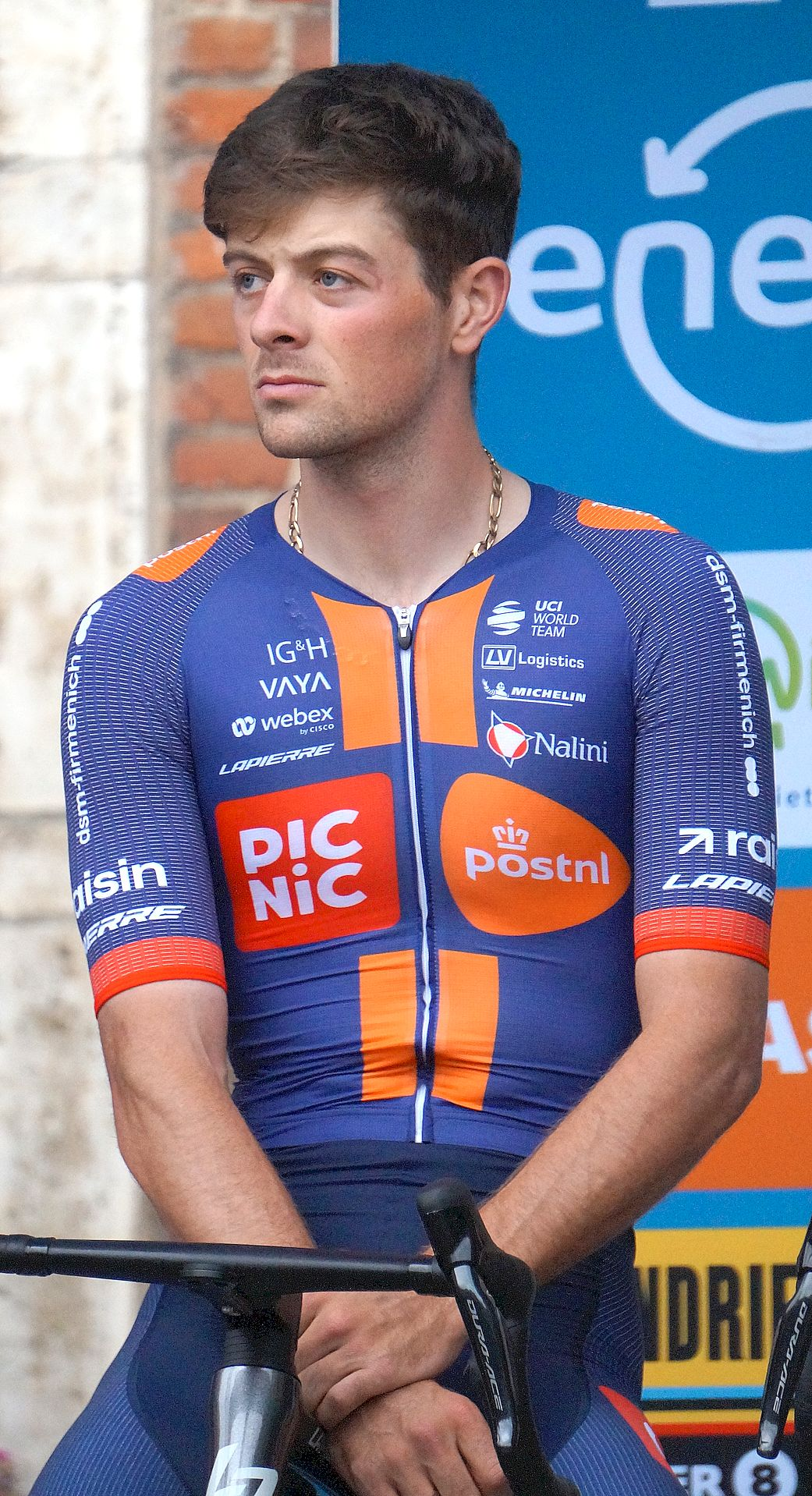

Personal information
- Born: 12 February 1999 (age 27) Banteer, Ireland

Cycling career
- Sport: Cycling
- Current team: Team Picnic–PostNL
- Discipline: Road
- Role: Rider

Amateur teams
- 2016: CGT Cork–Giant
- 2017: NRPT-Titan
- 2018: Team Gerard DHL
- 2019: Team Bioracer–DHL–Fr Services
- 2020–2021: Team Elite Restauration 89
- 2022–2023: CC Étupes

Professional teams
- 2021: EvoPro Racing (stagiaire)
- 2024–2025: St. Michel–Mavic–Auber93
- 2025: Team Picnic–PostNL (stagiaire)

Dillon Corkery (born 12 February 1999) is an Irish cyclist, who currently rides for UCI WorldTeam Team Picnic–PostNL after having ridden with the team as a stagiaire for the end of the 2025 season. He had ridden during the previous seasons for UCI Continental team St. Michel–Preference Home–Auber93.

== Major results ==
2018
1st Criterium, National Road Championships
2021
5th Time trial, National Under-23 Road Championships
2022
5th Paris–Troyes
9th Overall Tour du Pays de Montbéliard
2023
1st Overall Rás Tailteann

1st Stage 4

1st Stage 2 (ITT) Saint-Brieuc Agglo Tour
2nd Overall Tour de la Manche
5th Road race, National Road Championships
5th Overall Tour du Pays de Montbéliard
2024
1st Kells Criterium
2nd Road race, National Road Championships
2025
6th Grand Prix de Denain
8th La Roue Tourangelle
8th Grand Prix de la Ville de Lillers
