= Matthew Brennan (cyclist) =

British cyclist

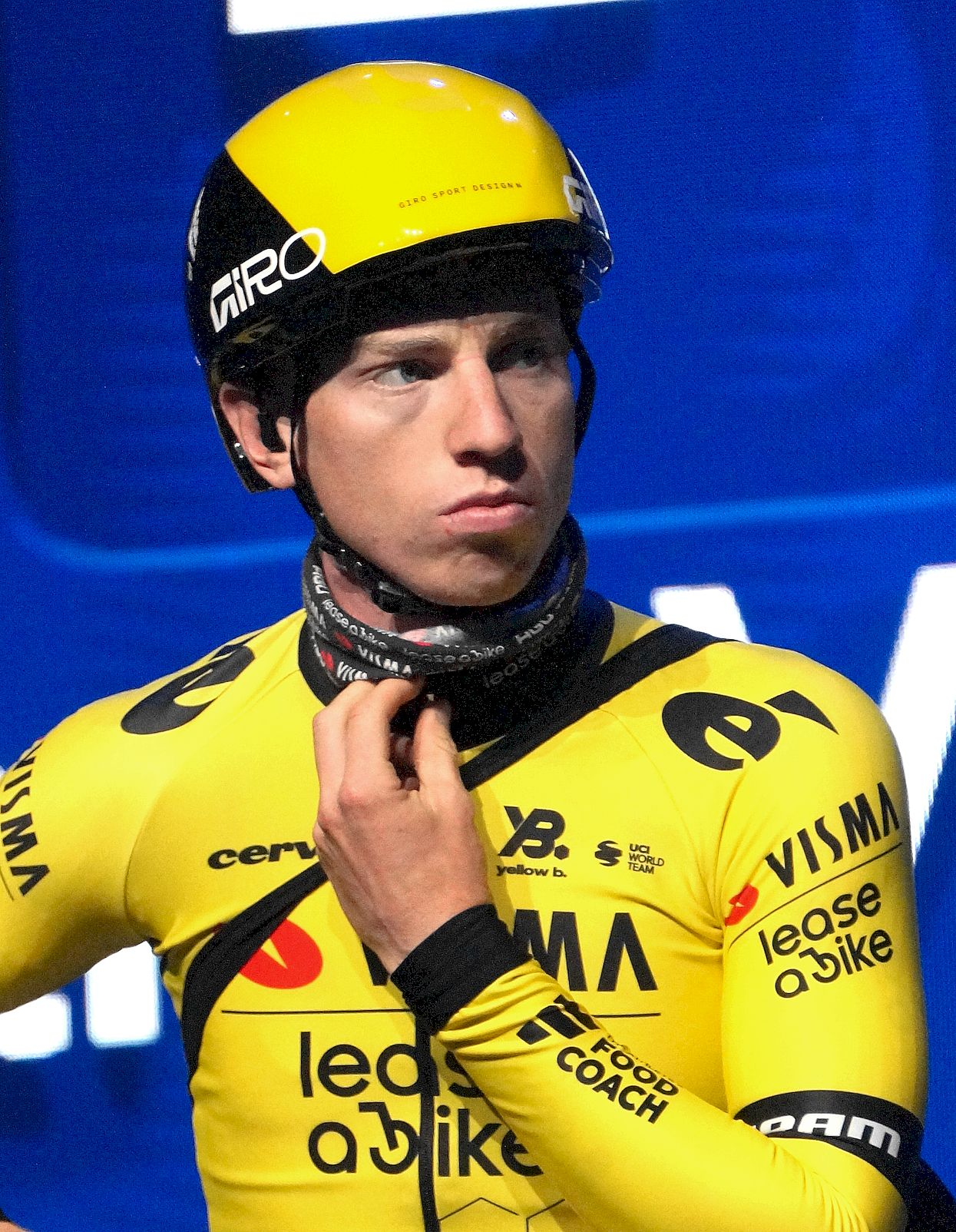
- Brennan at the 2025 Omloop Het Nieuwsblad.

Personal information
- Full name: Matthew James Brennan
- Nicknames: The Binman; The Darlington Dynamo
- Born: 6 August 2005 (age 21) Darlington, England
- Height: 1.77 m (5 ft 10 in)
- Weight: 68 kg (150 lb)

Cycling career
- Sport: Cycling
- Current team: Visma–Lease a Bike
- Disciplines: Track; Road
- Role: Rider
- Rider type: Sprinter

Amateur team
- 2022-2023: Fensham Howes-MAS Design

Professional teams
- 2024: Visma–Lease a Bike Development
- 2025–: Visma–Lease a Bike

Major wins
- Grand Tours Vuelta a España 5 individual stages (2026) Stage races Tour of Norway (2025) One-day races and Classics Kuurne–Brussels–Kuurne (2026) GP de Denain (2025)
Medal record
Men's track cycling
Representing Great Britain
World Junior Championships
Gold medal – first place	2023 Cali	Individual pursuit
Gold medal – first place	2023 Cali	Madison
Silver medal – second place	2023 Cali	Scratch

James Matthew Brennan (born 6 August 2005) is a British cyclist who currently rides for UCI WorldTeam Visma–Lease a Bike. In 2023, he became Junior World Track Cycling Champion in the Madison and the individual pursuit, in which he set a new junior world record.

== Early life ==
Brennan comes from Darlington, County Durham. He attended Mowden Junior School, Hummersknott Academy and then Teesdale School and Sixth Form in Barnard Castle. He started cycling on family days out and with local club Stockton Wheelers.

== Career ==
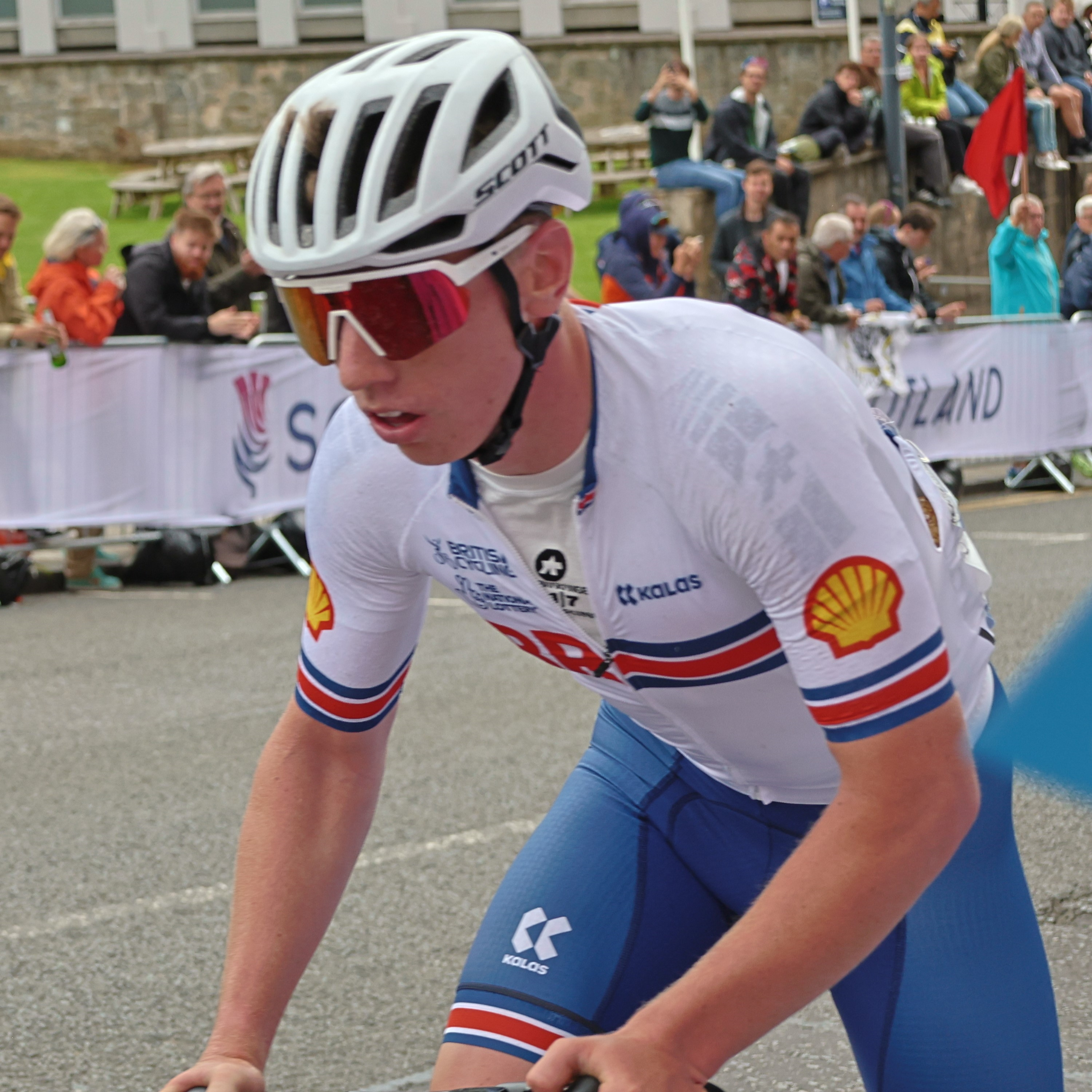
Brennan riding in the 2023 UCI Road World Championships - Men's junior road race

In 2023, Brennan rode for British-based Fensham Howes-MAS Design team. He won the Guido Reybrouck Classic, a two-day race in Belgium, in 2023.

In August 2023, competing at the Junior Track Cycling World Championships in Cali, Colombia, he became the junior world champion in the Madison, alongside Ben Wiggins, and the Individual Pursuit, in which he set a Junior World Record time. He was also a silver medalist in the Scratch Race.

In September 2023, he became the British national champion in the Derny with ex professional cyclist and Commonwealth Champion Paul Curran.

=== Team Visma ===
He signed for the Jumbo–Visma Development Team prior to the 2024 season. He made his debut at the 2025 Down Under Classic and finished in third place. He made his stage race debut at the 2025 Tour Down Under finishing runner-up on the opening stage. He won his first World Tour level stage on stage one of the 2025 Volta a Catalunya, followed by another victory on stage five. On 30 April 2025, he claimed his fourth win of the season with a sprint victory on the opening stage of the 2025 Tour de Romandie in Fribourg, also claiming the leaders yellow jersey from his compatriot Samuel Watson. At the 2025 Tour of Norway, he took two stages en route to winning the overall, points, and young rider classifications.

On 1 March 2026, he won the Kuurne–Brussels–Kuurne one day race in Belgium, the first Briton to win the race since Mark Cavendish in 2015. Competing at the 2026 Vuelta a España on his grand tour stage race debut, Brennan won the second, fifth, eleventh, sixteenth and seventeenth stages, becoming the youngest-ever rider to reach five Grand Tour stage victories.

== Major results ==
=== Road ===
2022
4th Nokere Koerse Juniors
4th Trofee van Vlaanderen Juniors
7th Overall Guido Reybrouck Juniors
8th E3 Saxo Bank Classic Juniors
2023
1st Overall Keizer der Juniores

1st Mountains classification
1st Stage 1

1st Overall Guido Reybrouck Juniors
National Junior Championships

3rd Time trial
5th Road race

7th Overall Grand Prix Rüebliland
10th E3 Saxo Bank Classic Juniors
10th Kuurne–Brussels–Kuurne Juniors
2024
1st Trofej Umag
1st Poreč Trophy
1st Stage 8 Giro Next Gen
3rd Circuit de Wallonie
4th Overall Orlen Nations Grand Prix
6th Rund um Köln
8th Overall Olympia's Tour
2025 (12 pro wins)
1st Road race, National Under-23 Championships
1st Overall Tour of Norway

1st Points classification
1st Young rider classification
1st Stages 2 & 4

1st Grand Prix de Denain
1st Rund um Köln
1st Grand Prix de la Ville de Lillers
1st Tour des 100 Communes
Volta a Catalunya

1st Stages 1 & 5

1st Stage 1 Tour de Romandie
1st Stage 5 Tour de Pologne
1st Stage 3 Tour of Britain
2nd Road race, National Championships
2nd Super 8 Classic
2nd Grand Prix d'Isbergues
4th Overall Deutschland Tour

1st Stages 1 & 4

2026 (12)
1st Kuurne–Brussels–Kuurne
Vuelta a España

1st Stages 2, 5, 11, 16 & 17
Held after Stages 2–3

Flèche du Sud

1st Points classification
1st Stages 1, 2 & 5

Vuelta a Burgos

1st Stages 1 & 4

1st Stage 5 Tour Down Under
2nd Cadel Evans Great Ocean Road Race

=== Grand Tour general classification results timeline ===
Grand Tour	2026
Giro d'Italia	—
Tour de France	—
Vuelta a España	108

=== Track ===
2023
UCI World Junior Championships

1st Madison (with Ben Wiggins)
1st Individual pursuit
2nd Scratch

National Championships

1st Derny
2nd Scratch
3rd Team pursuit

UEC European Junior Championships

2nd Individual pursuit
2nd Madison (with Ben Wiggins)
2nd Team pursuit

2024
3rd Individual pursuit, National Championships
