= 2022 Giro dell'Emilia =

- 2022 UCI ProSeries

Race details
- Dates: 1 October 2022
- Stages: 1
- Distance: 198.7 km (123.5 mi)
- Winning time: 4h 55' 31"

Results
	Winner	Enric Mas (ESP)	(Movistar Team)
	Second	Tadej Pogačar (SLO)	(UAE Team Emirates)
	Third	Domenico Pozzovivo (ITA)	(Intermarché–Wanty–Gobert Matériaux)

The 2022 Giro dell'Emilia was the 105th edition of the Giro dell'Emilia road cycling one day race in the titular region of central Italy. It was held on 1 October 2022 as part of the 2022 UCI ProSeries.

== Teams ==
16 of the 19 UCI WorldTeams and six UCI ProTeams, and four UCI Continental teams made up the 25 teams that participated in the race.

UCI WorldTeams

- AG2R Citroën Team
- Astana Qazaqstan Team
- Bora–Hansgrohe
- Cofidis
- EF Education–EasyPost
- Groupama–FDJ
- Ineos Grenadiers
- Intermarché–Wanty–Gobert Matériaux
- Israel–Premier Tech
- Lotto–Soudal
- Quick-Step Alpha Vinyl Team
- Movistar Team
- Team BikeExchange–Jayco
- Team Jumbo–Visma
- Trek–Segafredo
- UAE Team Emirates

UCI ProTeams

- Alpecin–Deceuninck
- Arkéa–Samsic
- Bardiani–CSF–Faizanè
- Bingoal Pauwels Sauces WB
- Caja Rural–Seguros RGA
- Drone Hopper–Androni Giocattoli
- Eolo–Kometa
- Equipo Kern Pharma
- Team TotalEnergies

== Result ==
Result
Rank	Rider	Team	Time
1	Enric Mas (ESP)	Movistar Team	4h 55' 31"
2	Tadej Pogačar (SLO)	UAE Team Emirates	+ 11"
3	Domenico Pozzovivo (ITA)	Intermarché–Wanty–Gobert Matériaux	+ 14"
4	Alejandro Valverde (ESP)	Movistar Team	+ 26"
5	Rigoberto Urán (COL)	EF Education–EasyPost	+ 31"
6	Lorenzo Fortunato (ITA)	Eolo–Kometa	+ 37"
7	Rubén Fernández (ESP)	Cofidis	+ 46"
8	Rudy Molard (FRA)	Groupama–FDJ	+ 53"
9	Davide Formolo (ITA)	UAE Team Emirates	+ 1' 12"
10	Michael Storer (AUS)	Groupama–FDJ	+ 1' 13"
