= 2019 Tour of Guangxi =

2019 UCI World Tour, race 38 of 38

Race details
- Dates: 17–22 October 2019
- Stages: 6
- Distance: 972.8 km (604.5 mi)
- Winning time: 22h 42' 42"

Results
Jersey awarded to the overall winner	Winner	Enric Mas (ESP)	(Deceuninck–Quick-Step)
	Second	Daniel Martínez (COL)	(EF Education First)
	Third	Diego Rosa (ITA)	(Team Ineos)
Jersey awarded to the points classification winner	Points	Pascal Ackermann (GER)	(Bora–Hansgrohe)
Jersey awarded to the mountains classification winner	Mountains	Tomasz Marczyński (POL)	(Lotto–Soudal)
Jersey awarded to the youth classification winner	Youth	Enric Mas (ESP)	(Deceuninck–Quick-Step)
	Team	Lotto–Soudal	

The 2019 Gree-Tour of Guangxi was a road cycling stage race that took place between 17 and 22 October 2019 in the Chinese province of Guangxi. It was the 3rd edition of the Tour of Guangxi and the thirty-eighth and final event of the 2019 UCI World Tour.

== Teams ==
Eighteen teams, including fifteen of the eighteen UCI WorldTour teams and three UCI Professional Continental teams, participated in the race. Each team entered seven riders, except Mitchelton–Scott which entered six riders and Team Jumbo–Visma which entered five riders. Of the 123 riders that started the race, 118 finished.

UCI WorldTeams

- Astana
- Bahrain–Merida
- Bora–Hansgrohe
- CCC Team
- Deceuninck–Quick-Step
- EF Education First
- Lotto–Soudal
- Mitchelton–Scott
- Movistar Team
- Team Dimension Data
- Team Ineos
- Team Jumbo–Visma
- Team Katusha–Alpecin
- Team Sunweb
- Trek–Segafredo
- UAE Team Emirates

UCI Professional Continental teams

- Israel Cycling Academy
- Total Direct Énergie
- Wanty–Gobert

== Route ==
Stage characteristics and winners
Stage	Date	Course	Distance	Type	Stage winner
1	17 October	Beihai to Beihai	135.6 km (84.3 mi)	Flat stage	Fernando Gaviria (COL)
2	18 October	Beihai to Qinzhou	152.3 km (94.6 mi)	Flat stage	Daniel McLay (GBR)
3	19 October	Nanning to Nanning	143 km (88.9 mi)	Flat stage	Pascal Ackermann (GER)
4	20 October	Nanning to Mashan Nongla Scenic Spot	161.4 km (100.3 mi)	Medium mountain stage	Enric Mas (ESP)
5	21 October	Liuzhou to Guilin	212.2 km (131.9 mi)	Medium mountain stage	Fernando Gaviria (COL)
6	22 October	Guilin to Guilin	168.3 km (104.6 mi)	Medium mountain stage	Pascal Ackermann (GER)
Total			972.8 km (604.5 mi)		

== Stages ==
=== Stage 1 ===
17 October 2019 — Beihai to Beihai, 135.6 km (84.3 mi)

Stage 1 result
Rank	Rider	Team	Time
1	Fernando Gaviria (COL)	UAE Team Emirates	2h 53' 42"
2	Pascal Ackermann (GER)	Bora–Hansgrohe	+ 0"
3	Matteo Trentin (ITA)	Mitchelton–Scott	+ 0"
4	Phil Bauhaus (GER)	Bahrain–Merida	+ 0"
5	Matteo Moschetti (ITA)	Trek–Segafredo	+ 0"
6	Max Kanter (GER)	Team Sunweb	+ 0"
7	Davide Martinelli (ITA)	Deceuninck–Quick-Step	+ 0"
8	Jakub Mareczko (ITA)	CCC Team	+ 0"
9	Riccardo Minali (ITA)	Israel Cycling Academy	+ 0"
10	Davide Ballerini (ITA)	Astana	+ 0"

General classification after Stage 1
Rank	Rider	Team	Time
1	Fernando Gaviria (COL)	UAE Team Emirates	2h 53' 32"
2	Pascal Ackermann (GER)	Bora–Hansgrohe	+ 4"
3	Matteo Trentin (ITA)	Mitchelton–Scott	+ 6"
4	Josef Černý (CZE)	CCC Team	+ 6"
5	Mikkel Frølich Honoré (DEN)	Deceuninck–Quick-Step	+ 6"
6	Ryan Mullen (IRL)	Trek–Segafredo	+ 6"
7	Phil Bauhaus (GER)	Bahrain–Merida	+ 10"
8	Matteo Moschetti (ITA)	Trek–Segafredo	+ 10"
9	Max Kanter (GER)	Team Sunweb	+ 10"
10	Davide Martinelli (ITA)	Deceuninck–Quick-Step	+ 10"

=== Stage 2 ===
18 October 2019 — Beihai to Qinzhou, 152.3 km (94.6 mi)

Stage 2 result
Rank	Rider	Team	Time
1	Daniel McLay (GBR)	EF Education First	3h 45' 04"
2	Pascal Ackermann (GER)	Bora–Hansgrohe	+ 0"
3	Matteo Trentin (ITA)	Mitchelton–Scott	+ 0"
4	Jonas Koch (GER)	CCC Team	+ 0"
5	Davide Ballerini (ITA)	Astana	+ 0"
6	Jakub Mareczko (ITA)	CCC Team	+ 0"
7	Timothy Dupont (BEL)	Wanty–Gobert	+ 0"
8	Fernando Gaviria (COL)	UAE Team Emirates	+ 0"
9	John Degenkolb (GER)	Trek–Segafredo	+ 0"
10	Riccardo Minali (ITA)	Israel Cycling Academy	+ 0"

General classification after Stage 2
Rank	Rider	Team	Time
1	Pascal Ackermann (GER)	Bora–Hansgrohe	6h 38' 34"
2	Fernando Gaviria (COL)	UAE Team Emirates	+ 2"
3	Daniel McLay (GBR)	EF Education First	+ 2"
4	Matteo Trentin (ITA)	Mitchelton–Scott	+ 4"
5	Jérôme Cousin (FRA)	Total Direct Énergie	+ 6"
6	Josef Černý (CZE)	CCC Team	+ 6"
7	Mikkel Frølich Honoré (DEN)	Deceuninck–Quick-Step	+ 6"
8	Laurens De Vreese (BEL)	Astana	+ 9"
9	Sep Vanmarcke (BEL)	EF Education First	+ 9"
10	Jakub Mareczko (ITA)	CCC Team	+ 12"

=== Stage 3 ===
19 October 2019 — Nanning to Nanning, 143 km (88.9 mi)

Stage 3 result
Rank	Rider	Team	Time
1	Pascal Ackermann (GER)	Bora–Hansgrohe	3h 19' 21"
2	Alexandr Riabushenko (BLR)	UAE Team Emirates	+ 0"
3	Matteo Trentin (ITA)	Mitchelton–Scott	+ 0"
4	Nikias Arndt (GER)	Team Sunweb	+ 0"
5	Petr Vakoč (CZE)	Deceuninck–Quick-Step	+ 0"
6	Lilian Calmejane (FRA)	Total Direct Énergie	+ 0"
7	Sep Vanmarcke (BEL)	EF Education First	+ 0"
8	Kiel Reijnen (USA)	Trek–Segafredo	+ 0"
9	Davide Martinelli (ITA)	Deceuninck–Quick-Step	+ 0"
10	Merhawi Kudus (ERI)	Astana	+ 0"

General classification after Stage 3
Rank	Rider	Team	Time
1	Pascal Ackermann (GER)	Bora–Hansgrohe	9h 57' 45"
2	Matteo Trentin (ITA)	Mitchelton–Scott	+ 7"
3	Alexandr Riabushenko (BLR)	UAE Team Emirates	+ 16"
4	Mikkel Frølich Honoré (DEN)	Deceuninck–Quick-Step	+ 18"
5	Sep Vanmarcke (BEL)	EF Education First	+ 19"
6	Jacopo Mosca (ITA)	Trek–Segafredo	+ 19"
7	Davide Villella (ITA)	Astana	+ 21"
8	Davide Martinelli (ITA)	Deceuninck–Quick-Step	+ 22"
9	Max Kanter (GER)	Team Sunweb	+ 22"
10	Itamar Einhorn (ISR)	Israel Cycling Academy	+ 22"

=== Stage 4 ===
20 October 2019 — Nanning to Mashan Nongla Scenic Spot, 161.4 km (100.3 mi)

Stage 4 result
Rank	Rider	Team	Time
1	Enric Mas (ESP)	Deceuninck–Quick-Step	3h 52' 53"
2	Daniel Martínez (COL)	EF Education First	+ 1"
3	Diego Rosa (ITA)	Team Ineos	+ 8"
4	Antwan Tolhoek (NED)	Team Jumbo–Visma	+ 12"
5	Felix Großschartner (AUT)	Bora–Hansgrohe	+ 19"
6	Odd Christian Eiking (NOR)	Wanty–Gobert	+ 19"
7	Carl Fredrik Hagen (NOR)	Lotto–Soudal	+ 19"
8	David de la Cruz (ESP)	Team Ineos	+ 19"
9	Martijn Tusveld (NED)	Team Jumbo–Visma	+ 28"
10	Davide Villella (ITA)	Astana	+ 28"

General classification after Stage 4
Rank	Rider	Team	Time
1	Enric Mas (ESP)	Deceuninck–Quick-Step	13h 50' 50"
2	Daniel Martínez (COL)	EF Education First	+ 5"
3	Diego Rosa (ITA)	Team Ineos	+ 14"
4	Antwan Tolhoek (NED)	Team Jumbo–Visma	+ 22"
5	Felix Großschartner (AUT)	Bora–Hansgrohe	+ 29"
6	Odd Christian Eiking (NOR)	Wanty–Gobert	+ 29"
7	Carl Fredrik Hagen (NOR)	Lotto–Soudal	+ 29"
8	David de la Cruz (ESP)	Team Ineos	+ 29"
9	Davide Villella (ITA)	Astana	+ 37"
10	Martijn Tusveld (NED)	Team Jumbo–Visma	+ 38"

=== Stage 5 ===
21 October 2019 — Liuzhou to Guilin, 212.2 km (131.9 mi)

Stage 5 result
Rank	Rider	Team	Time
1	Fernando Gaviria (COL)	UAE Team Emirates	5h 13' 42"
2	Pascal Ackermann (GER)	Bora–Hansgrohe	+ 0"
3	Matteo Trentin (ITA)	Mitchelton–Scott	+ 0"
4	Phil Bauhaus (GER)	Bahrain–Merida	+ 0"
5	Timothy Dupont (BEL)	Wanty–Gobert	+ 0"
6	Ben Swift (GBR)	Team Ineos	+ 0"
7	Max Kanter (GER)	Team Sunweb	+ 0"
8	Davide Martinelli (ITA)	Deceuninck–Quick-Step	+ 0"
9	John Degenkolb (GER)	Trek–Segafredo	+ 0"
10	Victor Campenaerts (BEL)	Lotto–Soudal	+ 0"

General classification after Stage 5
Rank	Rider	Team	Time
1	Enric Mas (ESP)	Deceuninck–Quick-Step	19h 04' 32"
2	Daniel Martínez (COL)	EF Education First	+ 5"
3	Diego Rosa (ITA)	Team Ineos	+ 14"
4	Antwan Tolhoek (NED)	Team Jumbo–Visma	+ 22"
5	Carl Fredrik Hagen (NOR)	Lotto–Soudal	+ 29"
6	Felix Großschartner (AUT)	Bora–Hansgrohe	+ 29"
7	Odd Christian Eiking (NOR)	Wanty–Gobert	+ 29"
8	David de la Cruz (ESP)	Team Ineos	+ 29"
9	Davide Villella (ITA)	Astana	+ 37"
10	Martijn Tusveld (NED)	Team Jumbo–Visma	+ 38"

=== Stage 6 ===
22 October 2019 — Guilin to Guilin, 168.3 km (104.6 mi)

Stage 6 result
Rank	Rider	Team	Time
1	Pascal Ackermann (GER)	Bora–Hansgrohe	3h 38' 10"
2	Juan Sebastián Molano (COL)	UAE Team Emirates	+ 0"
3	Timo Roosen (NED)	Team Jumbo–Visma	+ 0"
4	Rüdiger Selig (GER)	Bora–Hansgrohe	+ 0"
5	Jakub Mareczko (ITA)	CCC Team	+ 0"
6	Asbjørn Kragh Andersen (DEN)	Team Sunweb	+ 0"
7	Matteo Trentin (ITA)	Mitchelton–Scott	+ 0"
8	Daniel McLay (GBR)	EF Education First	+ 0"
9	Hamish Schreurs (NZL)	Israel Cycling Academy	+ 0"
10	Max Kanter (GER)	Team Sunweb	+ 0"

Final general classification
Rank	Rider	Team	Time
1	Enric Mas (ESP)	Deceuninck–Quick-Step	22h 42' 42"
2	Daniel Martínez (COL)	EF Education First	+ 5"
3	Diego Rosa (ITA)	Team Ineos	+ 14"
4	Antwan Tolhoek (NED)	Team Jumbo–Visma	+ 22"
5	Felix Großschartner (AUT)	Bora–Hansgrohe	+ 29"
6	Odd Christian Eiking (NOR)	Wanty–Gobert	+ 29"
7	Carl Fredrik Hagen (NOR)	Lotto–Soudal	+ 29"
8	David de la Cruz (ESP)	Team Ineos	+ 29"
9	Davide Villella (ITA)	Astana	+ 37"
10	Martijn Tusveld (NED)	Team Jumbo–Visma	+ 38"

== Classification leadership ==
Classification leadership by stage
Stage	Winner	General classification	Points classification	Mountains classification	Young rider classification	Team classification	Combativity award
1	Fernando Gaviria	Fernando Gaviria	Fernando Gaviria	Ryan Mullen	Fernando Gaviria	Wanty–Gobert	Ryan Mullen
2	Daniel McLay	Pascal Ackermann	Pascal Ackermann	Guillaume Martin	Pascal Ackermann	Wanty–Gobert	Sep Vanmarcke
3	Pascal Ackermann	Pascal Ackermann	Pascal Ackermann	Jacopo Mosca	Pascal Ackermann	Wanty–Gobert	Jacopo Mosca
4	Enric Mas	Enric Mas	Pascal Ackermann	Guillaume Martin	Enric Mas	Lotto–Soudal	Ryan Mullen
5	Fernando Gaviria	Enric Mas	Pascal Ackermann	Tomasz Marczyński	Enric Mas	Lotto–Soudal	Ryan Mullen
6	Pascal Ackermann	Enric Mas	Pascal Ackermann	Tomasz Marczyński	Enric Mas	Lotto–Soudal	Jay Thomson
Final		Enric Mas	Pascal Ackermann	Tomasz Marczyński	Enric Mas	Lotto–Soudal	not awarded

== Classification standings ==
=== General classification ===
Final general classification (1-10)
Rank	Rider	Team	Time
1	Enric Mas (ESP)	Deceuninck–Quick-Step	22h 42' 42"
2	Daniel Martínez (COL)	EF Education First	+ 5"
3	Diego Rosa (ITA)	Team Ineos	+ 14"
4	Antwan Tolhoek (NED)	Team Jumbo–Visma	+ 22"
5	Felix Großschartner (AUT)	Bora–Hansgrohe	+ 29"
6	Odd Christian Eiking (NOR)	Wanty–Gobert	+ 29"
7	Carl Fredrik Hagen (NOR)	Lotto–Soudal	+ 29"
8	David de la Cruz (ESP)	Team Ineos	+ 29"
9	Davide Villella (ITA)	Astana	+ 37"
10	Martijn Tusveld (NED)	Team Jumbo–Visma	+ 38"

=== Points classification ===
Final points classification (1-10)
Rank	Rider	Team	Points
1	Pascal Ackermann (GER)	Bora–Hansgrohe	62
2	Matteo Trentin (ITA)	Mitchelton–Scott	42
3	Fernando Gaviria (COL)	UAE Team Emirates	33
4	Ryan Mullen (IRL)	Trek–Segafredo	24
5	Daniel McLay (GBR)	EF Education First	22
6	Jay Thomson (RSA)	Team Dimension Data	18
7	Enric Mas (ESP)	Deceuninck–Quick-Step	15
8	Wang Meiyin (CHN)	Bahrain–Merida	14
9	Jakub Mareczko (ITA)	CCC Team	14
10	Jérôme Cousin (FRA)	Total Direct Énergie	12

=== Mountains classification ===
Final mountains classification (1-10)
Rank	Rider	Team	Points
1	Tomasz Marczyński (POL)	Lotto–Soudal	40
2	Guillaume Martin (FRA)	Wanty–Gobert	36
3	Ryan Mullen (IRL)	Trek–Segafredo	20
4	Enric Mas (ESP)	Deceuninck–Quick-Step	14
5	Daniel Martínez (COL)	EF Education First	10
6	Kevin Van Melsen (BEL)	Wanty–Gobert	8
7	Jay Thomson (RSA)	Team Dimension Data	7
8	Jacopo Mosca (ITA)	Trek–Segafredo	6
9	Wang Meiyin (CHN)	Bahrain–Merida	6
10	Davide Villella (ITA)	Astana	6

=== Young rider classification ===
Final young rider classification (1-10)
Rank	Rider	Team	Time
1	Enric Mas (ESP)	Deceuninck–Quick-Step	22h 42' 42"
2	Daniel Martínez (COL)	EF Education First	+ 5"
3	Antwan Tolhoek (NED)	Team Jumbo–Visma	+ 22"
4	Odd Christian Eiking (NOR)	Wanty–Gobert	+ 29"
5	Rémi Cavagna (FRA)	Deceuninck–Quick-Step	+ 41"
6	Maximilian Schachmann (GER)	Bora–Hansgrohe	+ 41"
7	Steff Cras (BEL)	Team Katusha–Alpecin	+ 41"
8	Merhawi Kudus (ERI)	Astana	+ 53"
9	Alexandr Riabushenko (BLR)	UAE Team Emirates	+ 1' 15"
10	Nick Schultz (AUS)	Mitchelton–Scott	+ 1' 21"

=== Teams classification ===
Final teams classification (1-10)
Rank	Team	Time
1	Lotto–Soudal	68h 11' 00"
2	Team Ineos	+ 16"
3	Astana	+ 17"
4	Wanty–Gobert	+ 33"
5	Team Dimension Data	+ 1' 30"
6	Deceuninck–Quick-Step	+ 1' 35"
7	Total Direct Énergie	+ 2' 44"
8	Israel Cycling Academy	+ 4' 57"
9	Team Sunweb	+ 4' 59"
10	CCC Team	+ 5' 09"
