= Enric Mas =

Spanish cyclist (born 1995)

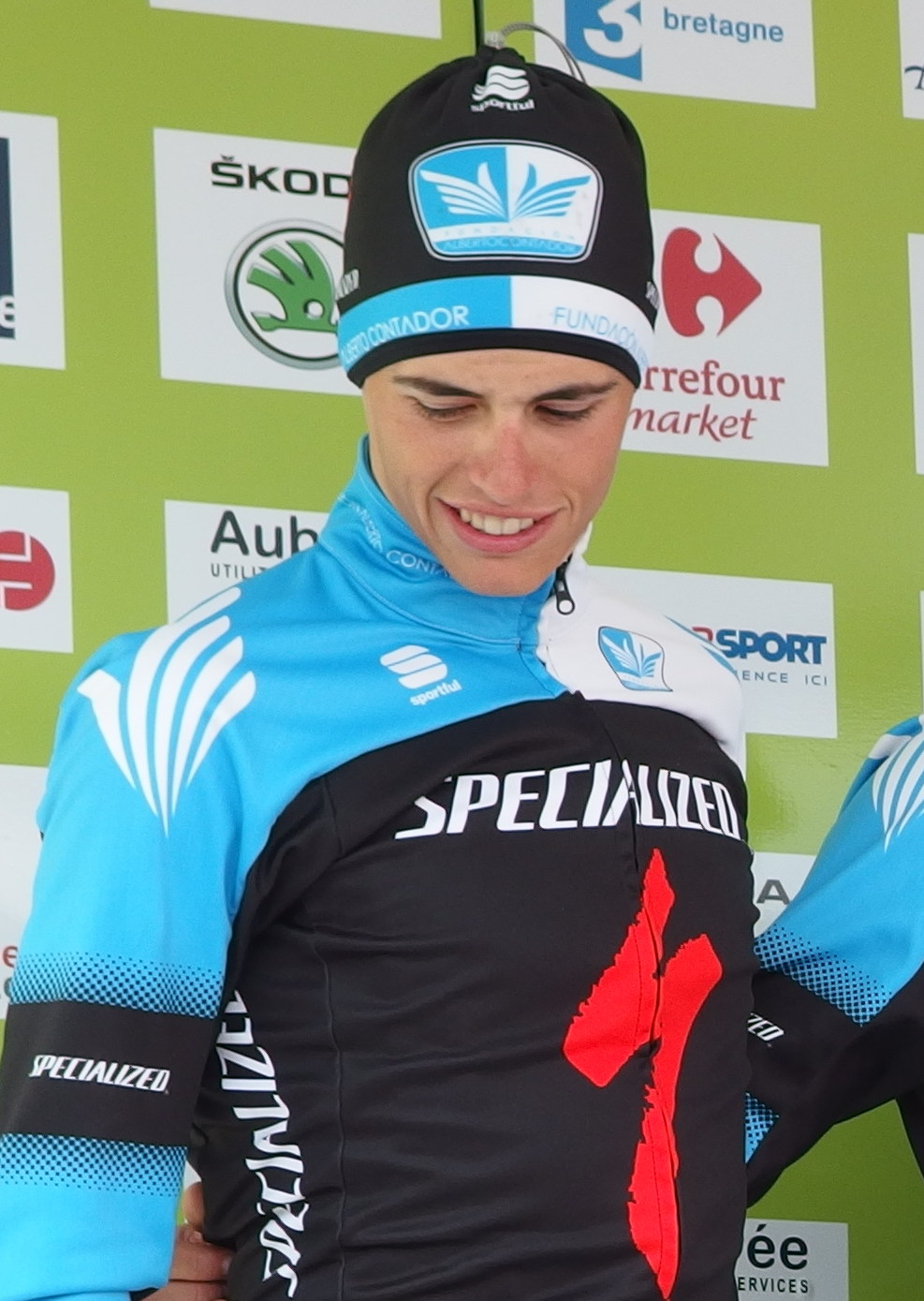
- Mas in 2014.

Personal information
- Full name: Enric Mas Nicolau
- Born: 7 January 1995 (age 31) Artà, Spain
- Height: 1.77 m (5 ft 9 1/2 in)
- Weight: 61 kg (134 lb; 9 st 8 lb)

Cycling career
- Sport: Cycling
- Current team: Movistar Team
- Discipline: Road
- Role: Rider
- Rider type: Climber

Amateur teams
- 2012: Sepelaco
- 2013–2015: Specialized–Fundación; Alberto Contador

Professional teams
- 2016: Klein Constantia
- 2017–2019: Quick-Step Floors
- 2020–: Movistar Team

Major wins
- Grand Tours Vuelta a España General classification (2026) Young rider classification (2018, 2020) 2 individual stages (2018, 2026) Stage races Tour of Guangxi (2019) One-day races and Classics Giro dell'Emilia (2022)

Enric Mas Nicolau (Catalan: [ənˈrik mas nikoˈlaw]) (born 7 January 1995) is a Spanish racing cyclist who rides for UCI WorldTeam Movistar Team. Mas is primarily a climber and general classification contender. He has found the most success at the Vuelta a España, which he won in 2026 and where he has also won two stages in 2018 and 2026, finished second overall a further 3 times, and twice won the young riders classification. Mas's achievements also include winning the 2019 Tour of Guangxi, a stage win at the Tour of the Basque Country, and a victory at the one-day classic Giro dell'Emilia.

== Career ==
Mas was born in Artà, a small town of about 7,500 people, which is the administrative seat of Llevant, on the island of Majorca, one of the Balearic Islands of Spain.

=== Quick-Step Floors (2017–2019) ===
==== 2017 ====
On 19 July 2016, UCI World Tour team Quick-Step Floors announced the signing of Mas for 2017 season. The 2017 season became the first season for Mas in the World Tour. His best result came at the Vuelta a Burgos, where he finished 2nd on the final stage and therefore finished 2nd overall. He was named in the startlist for the 2017 Vuelta a España. He won the Combativity Award on stages 6 and 20 at the Vuelta a España; on the penultimate stage to Angliru, Mas was in the breakaway and helped Alberto Contador win the stage.

==== 2018 ====
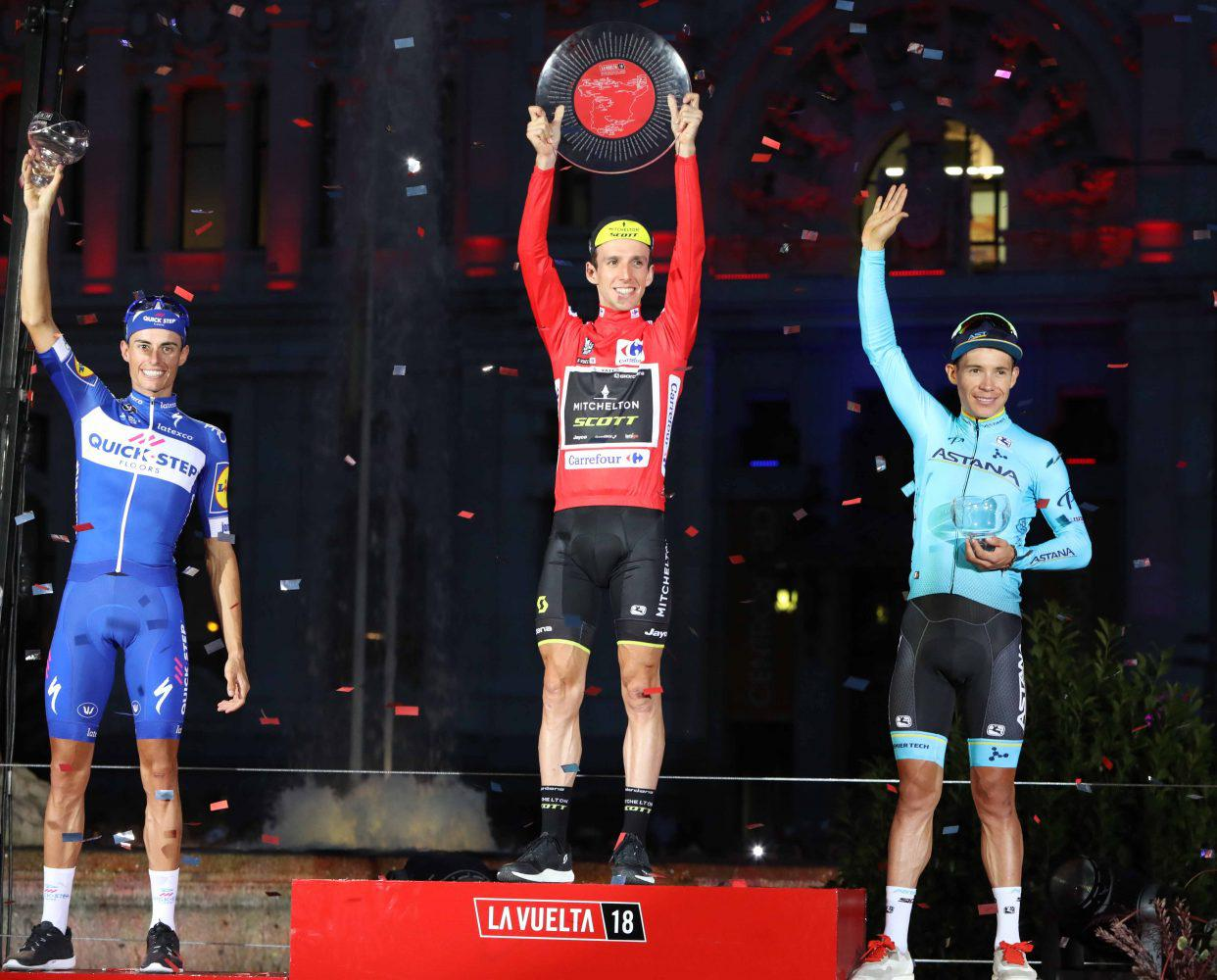
Mas (left) on the podium at the 2018 Vuelta a España.

The 2018 season was Enric Mas's second on the World Tour, and his first top 10 result came at the Tour of the Basque Country. He won the final stage to Arrate, which was his first professional victory. He moved up to 6th place in the general classification after the last stage, which meant he got his first ever top 10 world tour stage race finish; he also won the young rider classification. He continued his form, 2 months later when he placed 4th overall at the Tour de Suisse, and won the Young rider classification. He also managed to finish 2nd on stage 5 behind Diego Ulissi.

At the Vuelta a España, Mas was outside top 10 before the last two stages of the second week. He finished 7th on the Stage to Las Praeres, and moved up to 8th place. On the following Stage to the Lakes of Covadonga, he finished 6th and moved up to 6th place. On the Time trial he once again showed he had great form when he finished 6th. He moved up another place in the general classification. The race visited a new climb Balcón de Bizkaia on Stage 17. Mas was the strongest of the General classification contenders, and moved up to 3rd position overall. However he dropped to 4th place on Stage 19 which visited Naturlandia, Andorra. At the start of Stage 20, the gap between him and the 3rd placed rider Steven Kruijswijk was only 17 seconds. He attacked on the final climb together with Miguel Ángel López and Simon Yates. Mas rode together to the finish line with Lopez and outsprinted him, to take his first stage victory in a Grand Tour. With his performance on stage 20, Mas moved from 4th to 2nd place overall in the Vuelta, finishing on the podium in just his second Grand Tour.

==== 2019 ====
Mas earned top 10 places in both the 2019 Volta a Catalunya as well as the 2019 Tour de Suisse. In July 2019, he was named in the startlist for the 2019 Tour de France. He finished the race in 22nd place overall.

=== Movistar (since 2020) ===
==== 2020 ====
During the 2020 season he earned top 5 finishes in both the Tour and the Vuelta and won his second young rider competition in the latter. During that Vuelta he assisted Primož Roglič in securing his second title through the circumstances of the race situation. Richard Carapaz dropped Roglič on the final climb of the final mountain stage but Roglič was able to limit his losses by getting on the wheel of Mas and following him up the climb. Mas was fighting to gain time over Dan Martin and jump into 4th place in the overall standings.

==== 2021 ====
Mas rode in the 2021 Tour de France, which was marred by crashes and bad weather early in the race. He finished in 6th place overall, the highest placed rider on Movistar Team.

During the 2021 Vuelta a España Mas proved himself to be in very good form early in the race and the race eventually turned into a battle between Primož Roglič and him. By the end of the first week he was among the handful of riders within +1:00 of Roglič. After stage nine all of the other general classification riders had fallen behind and he was the only rider within a minute of Roglič being about +0:30 behind. Throughout the remainder of the race Mas was able to consistently stay with the Slovenian on most of the climbs. He lost time to Roglič on stage seventeen, which included a summit finish at Lagos de Covadonga, crossing the line with the surviving GC favorites about a minute and a half behind. On stage eighteen his teammate Miguel Ángel López attacked and won the stage. Mas did not join in this attack as he felt that if he also attacked Roglič would have gone with him. Stage twenty saw several highly placed riders lose considerable time when a gap formed between the GC riders. Mas was able to stay in the lead group and went into the final time trial about two and a half minutes behind Roglič, finishing in second overall.

==== 2022 ====
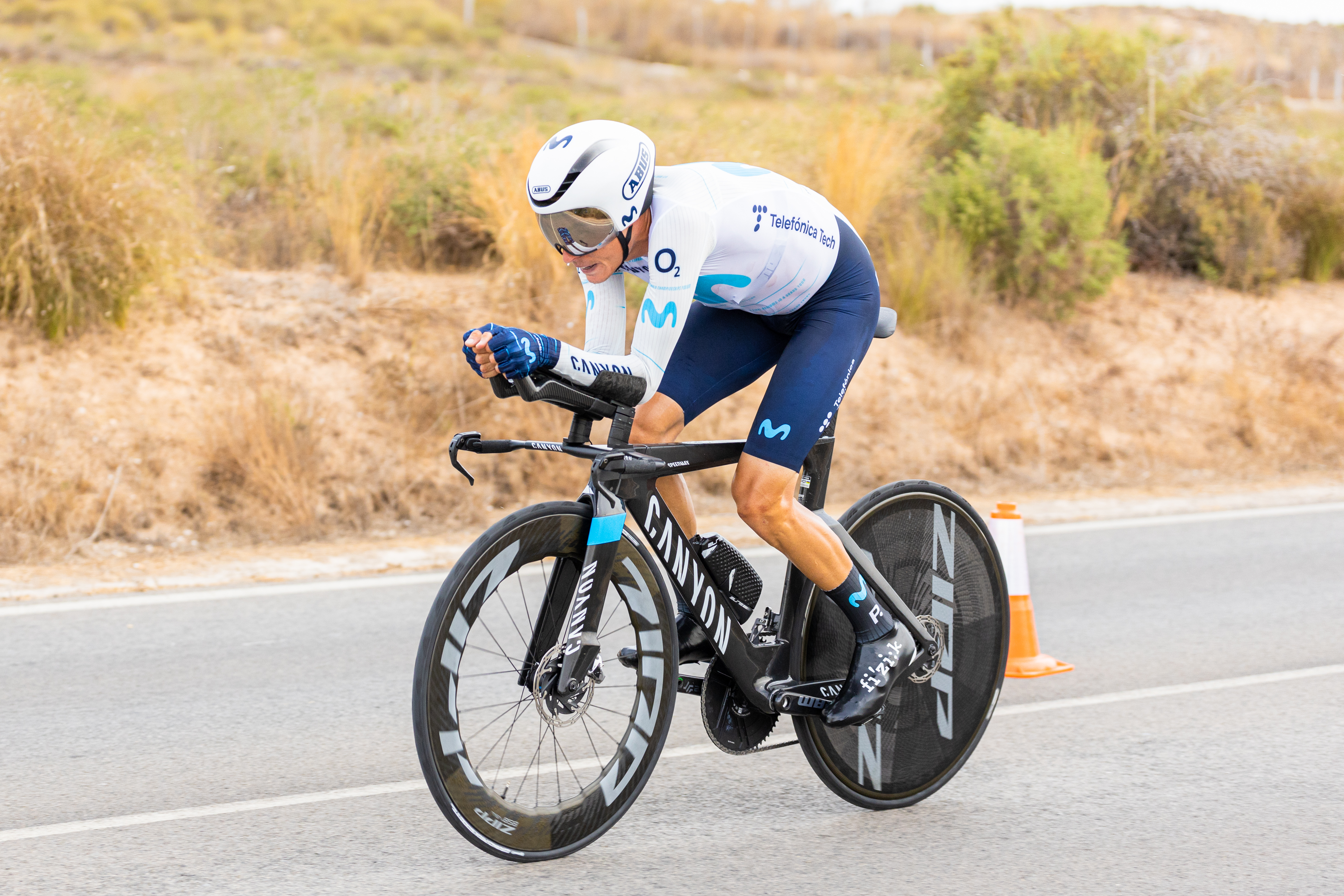
Mas at the 2022 Vuelta a España

Mas started the 2022 Tour de France as the leader for Team Movistar. He was forced to withdraw before stage 19 due to testing positive for COVID-19. Before his withdrawal, Mas was in 11th place in the general classification.

Later, Mas raced in the Vuelta a España, where he ultimately placed second overall, 2'02" behind Remco Evenepoel. This was Mas's third time placing second in the race. Mas finished the season with a strong performance in the Italian autumn classics, where he defeated Tadej Pogacar to win the 2022 Giro dell'Emilia, and placed second in Il Lombardia.

==== 2023 ====
Mas started the 2023 Tour de France but was involved in a crash on the first stage; he and Richard Carapaz had to withdraw.

== Major results ==
2012
1st Time trial, National Junior Road Championships
2013
4th Time trial, National Junior Road Championships
2014
4th Overall Course de la Paix Under-23
2015
2nd Overall Vuelta al Bidasoa
2016
1st Overall Volta ao Alentejo

1st Points classification
1st Young rider classification
1st Stage 2

1st Overall Tour de Savoie Mont-Blanc

1st Points classification
1st Young rider classification

2nd Overall Giro della Valle d'Aosta

1st Points classification

6th Overall Carpathian Couriers Race
2017
2nd Overall Vuelta a Burgos

1st Young rider classification

Vuelta a España

Combativity award Stages 6 & 20

2018 (2 pro wins)
2nd Overall Vuelta a España

1st Young rider classification
1st Stage 20

4th Overall Tour de Suisse

1st Young rider classification

6th Overall Tour of the Basque Country

1st Young rider classification
1st Stage 6

2019 (2)
1st Overall Tour of Guangxi

1st Young rider classification
1st Stage 4

4th Overall Volta ao Algarve
8th Clásica de San Sebastián
9th Overall Tour de Suisse
9th Overall Volta a Catalunya
10th Milano–Torino
Tour de France

Held after Stage 13

2020
5th Overall Tour de France
5th Overall Vuelta a España

1st Young rider classification

2021 (1)
2nd Overall Vuelta a España
3rd Overall Volta a la Comunitat Valenciana

1st Stage 3

3rd Mont Ventoux Dénivelé Challenge
6th Overall Tour de France
2022 (1)
1st Giro dell'Emilia
2nd Overall Vuelta a España
2nd Giro di Lombardia
4th Overall Volta a la Comunitat Valenciana
7th Trofeo Serra de Tramuntana
9th Overall Tour of the Basque Country
9th Coppa Agostoni
2023
4th Giro dell'Emilia
5th Overall Tour of the Basque Country
5th Overall Vuelta a Andalucía
6th Overall Vuelta a España
6th Overall Tirreno–Adriatico
2024
3rd Overall Vuelta a España
5th Overall Volta a Catalunya
5th Giro di Lombardia
6th Overall Tour de Romandie
7th Overall Tour de Suisse
8th Road race, UCI Road World Championships
8th Giro dell'Emilia
Combativity award Stage 20 Tour de France
2025
2nd Overall Tour of the Basque Country
3rd Overall Volta a Catalunya
3rd Andorra MoraBanc Clàssica
7th Overall Critérium du Dauphiné
9th Ardèche Classic
2026 (2)
1st Overall Vuelta a España

1st Stage 9

2nd Giro di Lombardia
5th Overall Vuelta a Burgos

=== General classification results timeline ===
Grand Tour general classification results
Grand Tour	2017	2018	2019	2020	2021	2022	2023	2024	2025	2026
Giro d'Italia	—	—	—	—	—	—	—	—	—	32
Tour de France	—	—	22	5	6	DNF	DNF	19	DNF	—
Vuelta a España	71	2	—	5	2	2	6	3	—	1
Major stage race general classification results
Race	2017	2018	2019	2020	2021	2022	2023	2024	2025	2026
Paris–Nice	—	—	—	—	—	—	—	—	—	—
Tirreno–Adriatico	—	—	—	—	—	DNF	6	12	—	—
Volta a Catalunya	75	44	9	NH	19	—	—	5	3	24
Tour of the Basque Country	14	6	11	NH	18	9	5	—	2	—
Tour de Romandie	—	—	—	NH	—	—	—	6	—	—
Critérium du Dauphiné	DNF	—	—	20	11	DNF	17	—	7	—
Tour de Suisse	—	4	9	NH	—	—	—	7	—	12

=== Classics results timeline ===
Monument	2017	2018	2019	2020	2021	2022	2023	2024	2025	2026
Milan–San Remo	Has not yet contested during his career									
Tour of Flanders	Has not yet contested during his career									
Paris–Roubaix	Has not yet contested during his career									
Liège–Bastogne–Liège	DNF	81	59	—	116	12	DNF	—	99	—
Giro di Lombardia	—	51	13	—	—	2	DNF	5	—	2
Classic	2017	2018	2019	2020	2021	2022	2023	2024	2025	2026
La Flèche Wallonne	—	DNF	30	—	77	33	17	—	DNF	—
Clásica de San Sebastián	77	—	8	NH	—	—	—	—	—	17
Milano–Torino	—	66	10	—	—	—	—	—	—	—
Giro dell'Emilia	—	—	—	—	—	1	4	8	—	
Tre Valli Varesine	—	—	—	NH	—	22	11	NR	—	

Legend
—	Did not compete
DNF	Did not finish
NH	Not held
NR	No result
