= 2025 Grand Prix de Denain =

French cycling race

2025 UCI ProSeries

Race details
- Dates: 20 March 2025
- Stages: 1
- Distance: 197.4 km (122.7 mi)
- Winning time: 4h 15' 54"

Results
	Winner	Matthew Brennan (GBR)	(Visma–Lease a Bike)
	Second	Gianni Vermeersch (BEL)	(Alpecin–Deceuninck)
	Third	Dries De Bondt (BEL)	(Decathlon–AG2R La Mondiale)

The 2025 Grand Prix de Denain – Porte du Hainaut was the 66th edition of the Grand Prix de Denain one-day road cycling race. It was held on 20 March 2025 as a category 1.Pro race on the 2025 UCI ProSeries calendar.

== Teams ==
Twelve UCI WorldTeams, seven UCI ProTeams, and four UCI Continental teams made up the 23 teams that participated in the race. In total, 154 riders entered the race, of which 114 finished.

UCI WorldTeams

- Alpecin–Deceuninck
- Arkéa–B&B Hotels
- Cofidis
- Decathlon–AG2R La Mondiale
- Groupama–FDJ
- Intermarché–Wanty
- Soudal–Quick-Step
- Team Bahrain Victorious
- Team Jayco–AlUla
- UAE Team Emirates XRG
- Visma–Lease a Bike
- XDS Astana Team

UCI ProTeams

- Euskaltel–Euskadi
- Lotto
- Q36.5 Pro Cycling Team
- Team Flanders–Baloise
- Team TotalEnergies
- Unibet Tietema Rockets
- Wagner Bazin WB

UCI Continental Teams

- CIC–U–Nantes
- Nice Métropole Côte d'Azur
- St. Michel–Preference Home–Auber93
- Van Rysel–Roubaix

== Result ==
Result (1–10)
Rank	Rider	Team	Time
1	Matthew Brennan (GBR)	Visma–Lease a Bike	4h 15' 54"
2	Gianni Vermeersch (BEL)	Alpecin–Deceuninck	+ 0"
3	Dries De Bondt (BEL)	Decathlon–AG2R La Mondiale	+ 0"
4	Florian Vermeersch (BEL)	UAE Team Emirates XRG	+ 0"
5	Brent Van Moer (BEL)	Lotto	+ 0"
6	Dillon Corkery (IRL)	St. Michel–Preference Home–Auber93	+ 0"
7	Tomáš Kopecký (CZE)	Unibet Tietema Rockets	+ 0"
8	Alec Segaert (BEL)	Lotto	+ 0"
9	Arnaud De Lie (BEL)	Lotto	+ 30"
10	Lewis Askey (GBR)	Groupama–FDJ	+ 30"
