= Palazuelos de Muñó =

Coordinates: 42°12′N 3°59′W

- Municipality and town
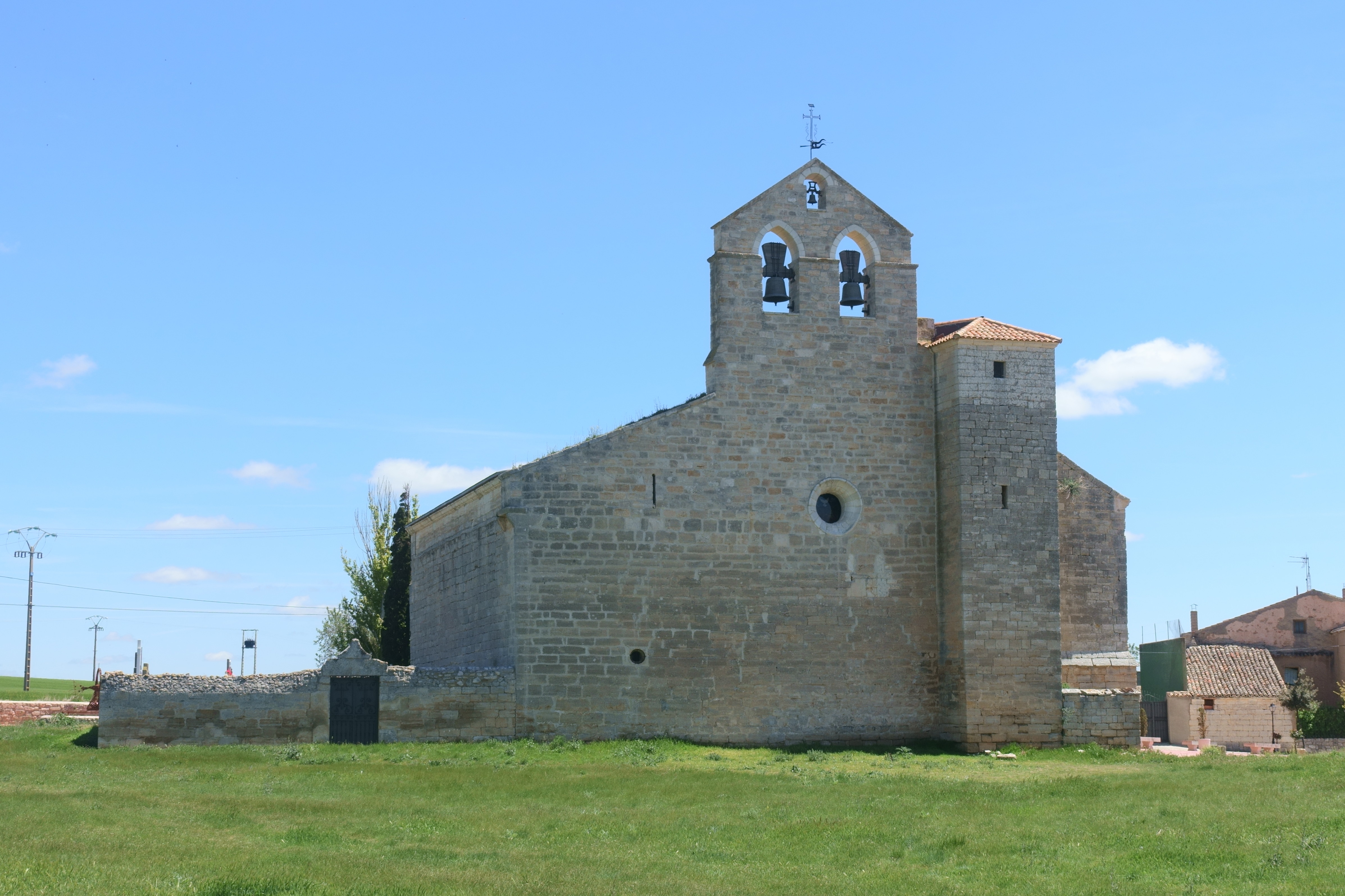
- Church of San Juan Bautista in Palazuelos de Muñó
- Interactive map of Palazuelos de Muñó
- Country: Spain
- Autonomous community: Castile and León
- Province: Burgos
- Comarca: Arlanza

Area
  - Total: 8 km^{2} (3.1 sq mi)
- Elevation: 787 m (2,582 ft)

Population (2025-01-01)
  - Total: 52
  - Density: 6.5/km^{2} (17/sq mi)
- Time zone: UTC+1 (CET)
  - Summer (DST): UTC+2 (CEST)
- Postal code: 09226
- Climate: Cfb
- Website: https://www.palazuelosdemuño.es/

Palazuelos de Muñó is a municipality and town located in the province of Burgos, Castile and León, Spain. According to the 2022 census (INE), the municipality has a population of 55 inhabitants.
