= Arcos de la Llana =

- Municipality and town
- Villa de Arcos de la Llana
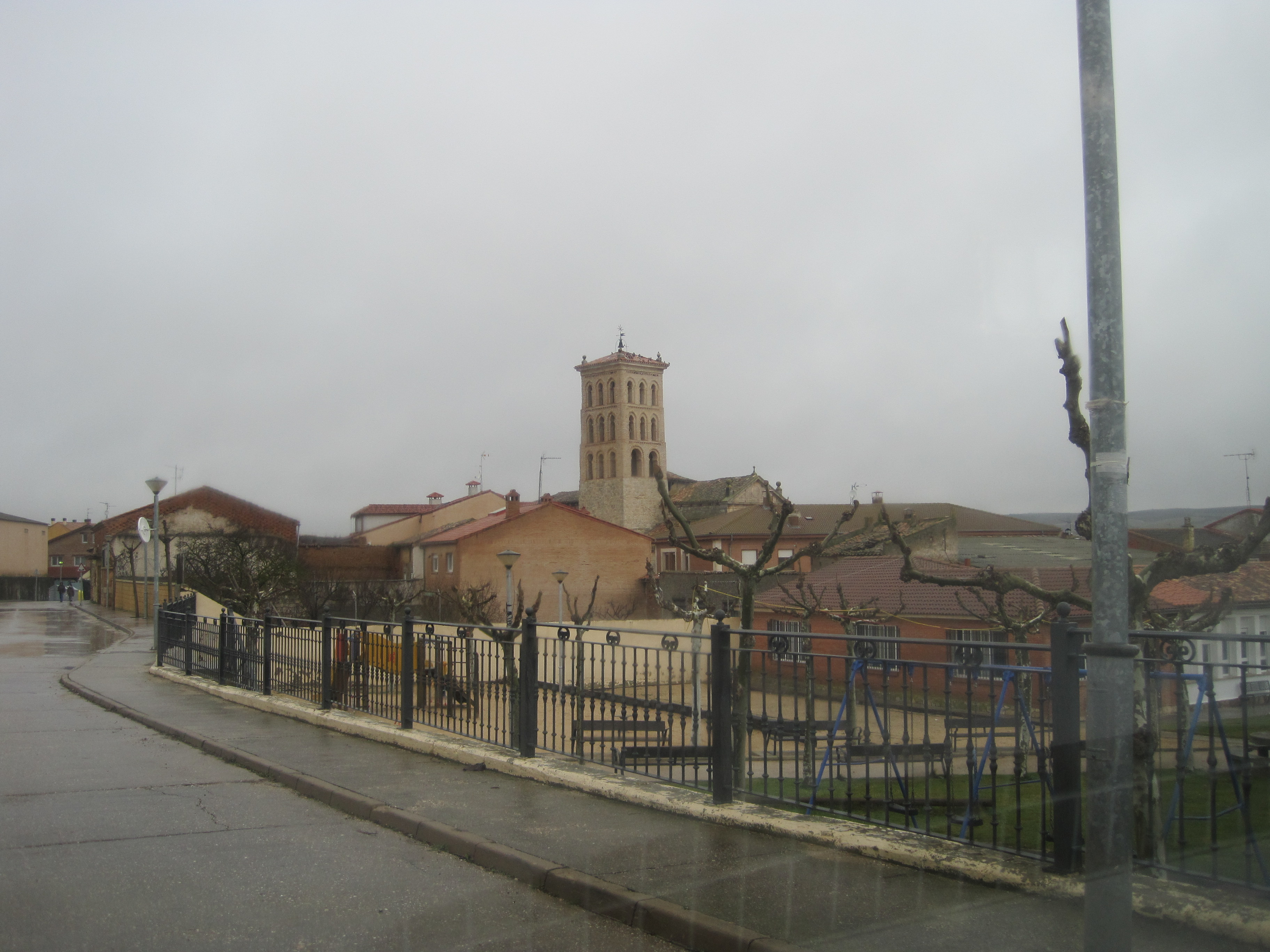
- View of Arcos de la Llana, 2010

- Coat of arms

- Location within Castile and León Location within Spain
- Coordinates: 42°15′46″N 3°45′03″W
- Country: Spain
- Autonomous community: Castile and León
- Province: Burgos
- Comarca: Alfoz de Burgos
- Seat: Arcos de la Llana

Area
  - Total: 31.44 km^{2} (12.14 sq mi)
- Elevation: 849 m (2,785 ft)
- Time zone: UTC+1 (CET)
  - Summer (DST): UTC+2 (CEST)
- Postal code: 09195
- Website: http://www.arcosdelallana.es/

Arcos de la Llana is a Spanish town and municipality in the province of Burgos, Castilla la Vieja, in the autonomous community of Castilla y León (Spain), the region of Alfoz de Burgos, the judicial district of Burgos, and head of the city council of Arcos de la Llana.

The municipality of Arcos de la Llana is made up of two towns: Arcos de la Llana (seat or capital) and Villanueva-Matamala.

== Geography ==
Arcos de la Llana is crossed by the Ausín river. At the entrance to town, there is a small linear park around the river, which was recently restored.

== See also ==
- List of municipalities in Burgos
