= Merindad de Montija =

- Municipality
- Coat of arms
- Interactive map of Merindad de Montija
- Coordinates: 43.0917°N 3.4342°W
- Country: Spain
- Autonomous community: Castile and León
- Province: Burgos
- Comarca: Las Merindades
- Seat: Villasante de Montija

Area
  - Total: 99 km^{2} (38 sq mi)
- Elevation: 894 m (2,933 ft)

Population (2025-01-01)
  - Total: 723
  - Density: 7.3/km^{2} (19/sq mi)
- Time zone: UTC+1 (CET)
  - Summer (DST): UTC+2 (CEST)
- Postal code: 09514
- Website: http://www.merindaddemontija.es/

Merindad de Montija is a municipality located in the province of Burgos, Castile and León, Spain. According to the 2004 census (INE), the municipality has a population of 868 inhabitants. Its seat is in Villasante de Montija.

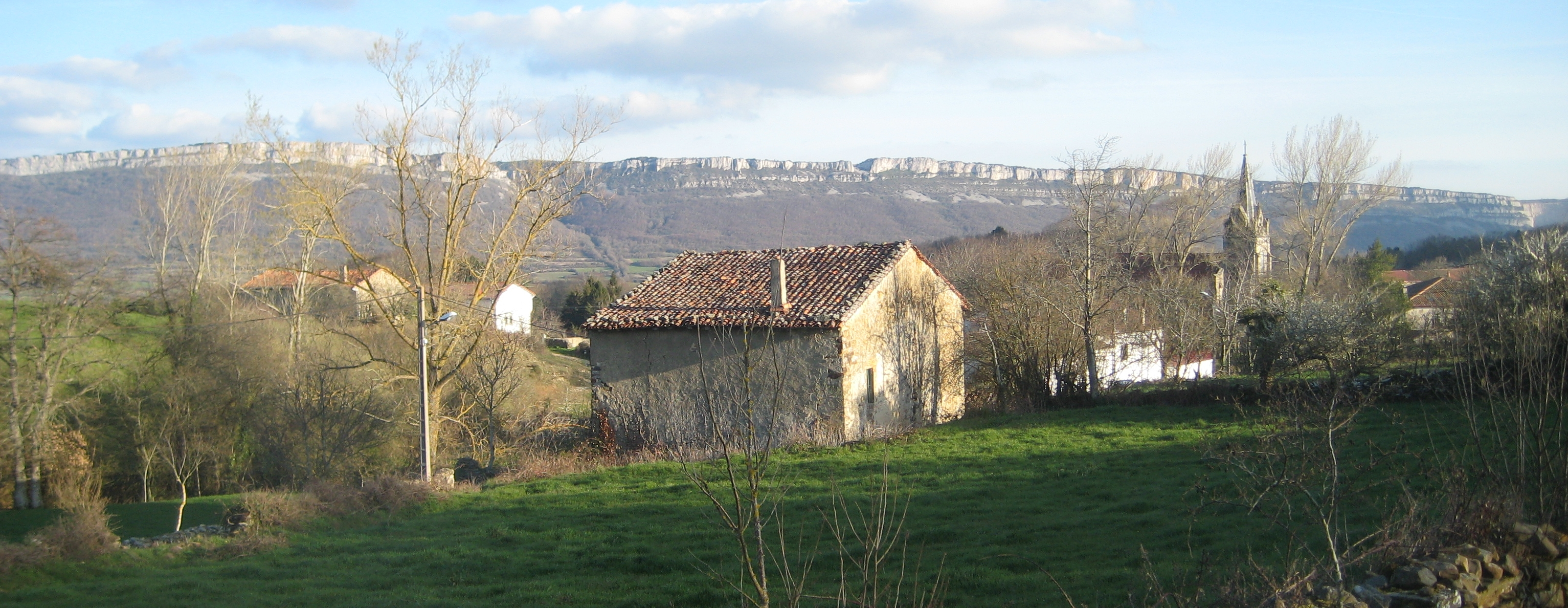
Hamlet in Merindad de Montija
