= Pablo Torres (cyclist, born 2005) =

Spanish cyclist (born 2005)

Personal information
- Full name: Pablo Torres Arias
- Born: 10 November 2005 (age 20) Madrid, Spain

Cycling career
- Sport: Cycling
- Current team: UAE Team Emirates XRG
- Discipline: Road
- Role: Rider
- Rider type: Climber

Amateur team
- 2022–2023: Sanse–Rotor

Professional teams
- 2024: UAE Team Emirates Gen Z
- 2025–: UAE Team Emirates XRG

Pablo Torres Arias (born 10 November 2005) is a Spanish professional racing cyclist, who currently rides for UCI WorldTeam UAE Team Emirates XRG. A climber, he finished second overall and won two stages of the 2024 Tour de l'Avenir. He also placed second in the Giro Next Gen the same year. In October 2024, as an 18 year old, he signed a six-year professional contract with Team UAE.

== Major results ==
2023
7th Overall Vuelta Junior a la Ribera del Duero
2024
2nd Overall Tour de l'Avenir

1st Young rider classification
1st Stages 4 & 6

2nd Overall Giro Next Gen
3rd Overall Giro della Regione Friuli Venezia Giulia
5th Overall Giro della Valle d'Aosta

1st Stage 5

2025
3rd Overall Giro d'Abruzzo

1st Young rider classification

7th Overall Tour de l'Avenir
2026
3rd Time trial, National Road Championships
