= 2024 Movistar Team (men's team) season =

Movistar Team
- 2024 season
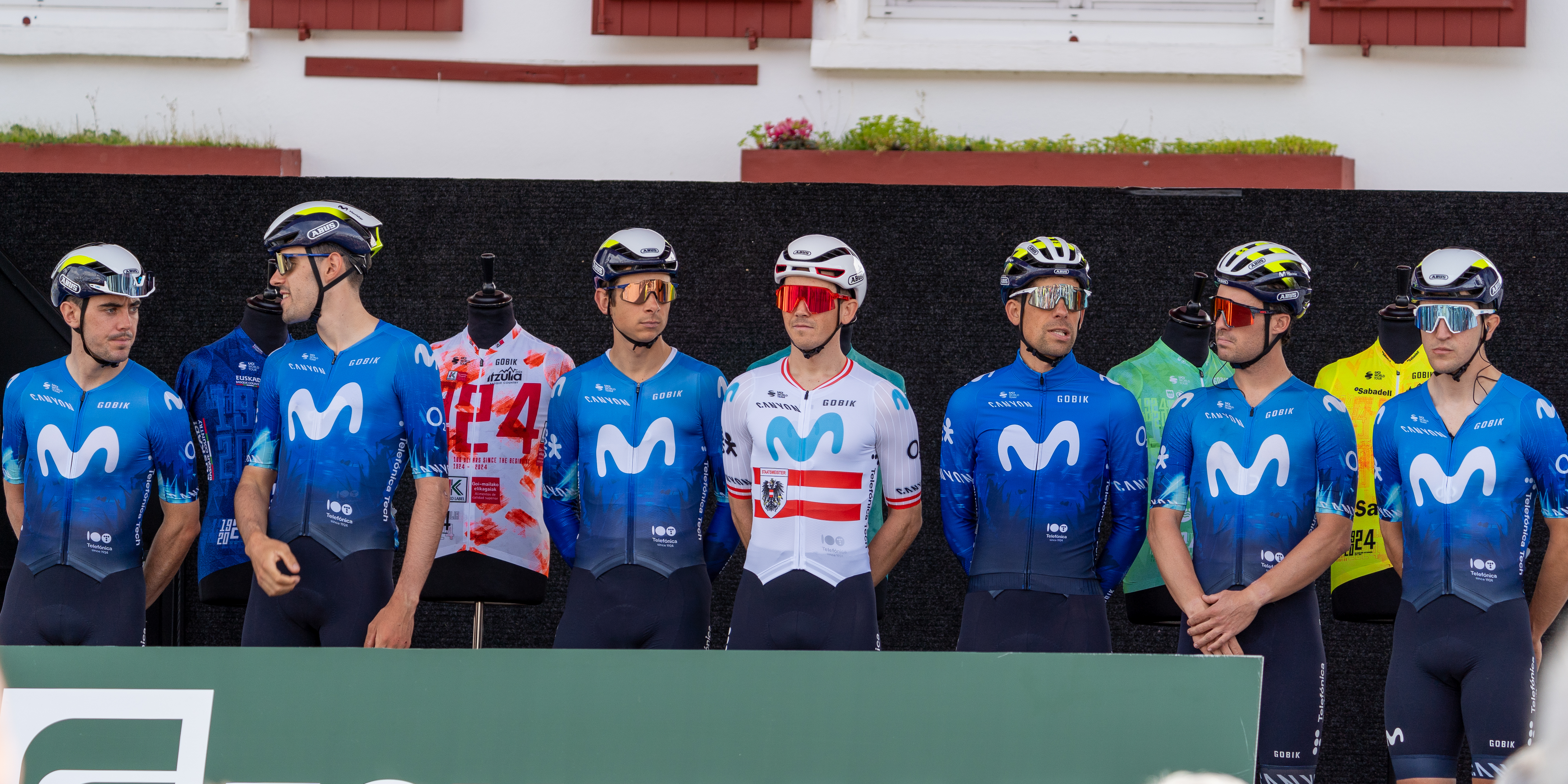
- UCI code: MOV
- Status: UCI WorldTeam
- Manager: Eusebio Unzué (ESP)
- Main sponsor(s): Movistar
- Based: Spain
- Bicycles: Canyon
- Groupset: SRAM

Season victories
- One-day races: 3
- Stage race stages: 4
- World Championships: 1
- National Championships: 1
- Most wins: (Spain) Alex Aranburu (Spain) Pelayo Sánchez (2 wins each)

The 2024 season for the Movistar Team is the 45th season in the team's existence and the 14th season under the current name. The team has been a UCI WorldTeam since 2005, when the tier was first established.

== Team roster ==
As of 10 January 2024.

Rider	Date of birth
Alex Aranburu (ESP)	19 September 1995 (aged 28)
Jorge Arcas (ESP)	8 July 1992 (aged 31)
Jon Barrenetxea (ESP)	20 April 2000 (aged 23)
Will Barta (USA)	4 January 1996 (aged 27)
Carlos Canal (ESP)	28 June 2001 (aged 22)
Rémi Cavagna (FRA)	10 August 1995 (aged 28)
Davide Cimolai (ITA)	13 August 1989 (aged 34)
Davide Formolo (ITA)	25 October 1992 (aged 31)
Iván García Cortina (ESP)	20 November 1995 (aged 28)
Fernando Gaviria (COL)	19 August 1994 (aged 29)
Ruben Guerreiro (POR)	6 July 1994 (aged 29)
Johan Jacobs (SUI)	1 March 1997 (aged 26)
Oier Lazkano (ESP)	7 November 1999 (aged 24)
Enric Mas (ESP)	7 January 1995 (aged 28)
Lorenzo Milesi (ITA)	19 March 2002 (aged 21)

Rider	Date of birth
Manlio Moro (ITA)	17 March 2002 (aged 21)
Gregor Mühlberger (AUT)	4 April 1994 (aged 29)
Mathias Norsgaard (DEN)	5 May 1997 (aged 26)
Nelson Oliveira (POR)	6 March 1989 (aged 34)
Antonio Pedrero (ESP)	23 October 1991 (aged 32)
Nairo Quintana (COL)	4 February 1990 (aged 33)
Vinícius Rangel (BRA)	26 May 2001 (aged 22)
Iván Romeo (ESP)	16 August 2003 (aged 20)
Javier Romo (ESP)	6 January 1999 (aged 24)
Einer Rubio (COL)	22 February 1998 (aged 25)
Sergio Samitier (ESP)	31 August 1995 (aged 28)
Pelayo Sánchez (ESP)	27 March 2000 (aged 23)
Gonzalo Serrano (ESP)	17 August 1994 (aged 29)
Iván Sosa (COL)	31 October 1997 (aged 26)
Albert Torres (ESP)	26 April 1990 (aged 33)

== Season victories ==
Date	Race	Competition	Rider	Country	Location	Ref.
27 January	Trofeo Pollença - Port d'Andratx	UCI Europe Tour	Pelayo Sánchez (ESP)	Spain	Andratx	
4 February	Volta a la Comunitat Valenciana, stage 5	UCI ProSeries	Will Barta (USA)	Spain	Valencia	
6 February	Tour Colombia, stage 1	UCI America Tour	Fernando Gaviria (COL)	Colombia	Duitama	
12 February	Clásica Jaén Paraíso Interior	UCI Europe Tour	Oier Lazkano (ESP)	Spain	Úbeda	
9 May	Giro d'Italia, stage 6	UCI World Tour	Pelayo Sánchez (ESP)	Italy	Rapolano Terme	
15 June	Tour of Belgium, stage 4	UCI ProSeries	Alex Aranburu (ESP)	Belgium	Durbuy	
11 August	Circuito de Getxo	UCI Europe Tour	Jon Barrenetxea (ESP)	Spain	Getxo	

== National, Continental, and World Champions ==
Date	Discipline	Jersey	Rider	Country	Location	Ref.
23 June	Spanish National Road Race Championships		Alex Aranburu (ESP)	Spain	San Lorenzo de El Escorial	
23 September	World Under-23 Time Trial Championships		Iván Romeo (ESP)	Switzerland	Zürich	
