= 2023 O Gran Camiño =

Spanish cycling race

2023 UCI Europe Tour

Race details
- Dates: 23–26 February 2023
- Stages: 3
- Distance: 329.4 km (204.7 mi)
- Winning time: 8h 16' 55"

Results
Jersey awarded to the overall winner	Winner	Jonas Vingegaard (DEN)	(Team Jumbo–Visma)
	Second	Jesús Herrada (ESP)	(Cofidis)
	Third	Ruben Guerreiro (POR)	(Movistar Team)
Jersey awarded to the points classification winner	Points	Sebastian Schönberger (AUT)	(Human Powered Health)
Jersey awarded to the mountains classification winner	Mountains	Jonas Vingegaard (DEN)	(Team Jumbo–Visma)
Jersey awarded to the youth classification winner	Youth	Lukas Nerurkar (GBR)	(Trinity Racing)
	Team	(France) Cofidis	

The 2023 O Gran Camiño (English: The Great Way) was a road cycling stage race that took place from 23 to 26 February 2023 in the autonomous community of Galicia in northwestern Spain. The race was rated as a category 2.1 event on the 2023 UCI Europe Tour calendar and was the second edition of the O Gran Camiño.

== Teams ==
UCI WorldTeams

- Astana Qazaqstan Team
- Cofidis
- Movistar Team
- Team Jumbo–Visma

UCI ProTeams

- Burgos BH
- Caja Rural–Seguros RGA
- Eolo–Kometa
- Equipo Kern Pharma
- Euskaltel–Euskadi
- Human Powered Health
- Q36.5 Pro Cycling Team

UCI Continental Teams

- AP Hotels & Resorts–Tavira–SC Farense
- Team Corratec
- Efapel Cycling
- Electro Hiper Europa
- Rádio Popular–Paredes–Boavista
- Tavfer–Ovos Matinados–Mortágua
- Trinity Racing

== Route ==
Stage characteristics and winners
Stage	Date	Course	Distance	Type	Stage winner
1	23 February	Muralla de Lugo to Sarria	~~188 km (117 mi)~~	Hilly stage	Cancelled
2	24 February	Tui to A Guarda (Monte Trega)	184.3 km (114.5 mi)	Hilly stage	Jonas Vingegaard (DEN)
3	25 February	Esgos to Rubiá (Alto do Castelo)	127 km (79 mi)	Mountain stage	Jonas Vingegaard (DEN)
4	26 February	O Milladoiro to Santiago	18.1 km (11.2 mi)	Individual time trial	Jonas Vingegaard (DEN)
Total			~~517.4 km (321.5 mi)~~ 329.4 km (204.7 mi)		

== Stages ==
=== Stage 1 ===
23 February 2023 — Muralla de Lugo to Sarria, 188 km (117 mi)

The stage was cancelled due to bad weather.

=== Stage 2 ===
24 February 2023 — Tui to A Guarda (Monte Trega), 184.3 km (114.5 mi)

Stage 2 Result (1–10)
Rank	Rider	Team	Time
1	Jonas Vingegaard (DEN)	Team Jumbo–Visma	4h 33' 33"
2	Ruben Guerreiro (POR)	Movistar Team	+ 21"
3	Ion Izagirre (ESP)	Cofidis	+ 24"
4	Antonio Pedrero (ESP)	Movistar Team	+ 26"
5	Jesús Herrada (ESP)	Cofidis	+ 26"
6	Victor Langellotti (MON)	Burgos BH	+ 26"
7	Lorenzo Fortunato (ITA)	Eolo–Kometa	+ 28"
8	Lukas Nerurkar (GBR)	Trinity Racing	+ 31"
9	Rubén Fernández (ESP)	Cofidis	+ 33"
10	Attila Valter (HUN)	Team Jumbo–Visma	+ 35"

General classification after Stage 2 (1–10)
Rank	Rider	Team	Time
1	Jonas Vingegaard (DEN)	Team Jumbo–Visma	4h 33' 20"
2	Ruben Guerreiro (POR)	Movistar Team	+ 28"
3	Ion Izagirre (ESP)	Cofidis	+ 33"
4	Antonio Pedrero (ESP)	Movistar Team	+ 39"
5	Jesús Herrada (ESP)	Cofidis	+ 39"
6	Victor Langellotti (MON)	Burgos BH	+ 39"
7	Lorenzo Fortunato (ITA)	Eolo–Kometa	+ 41"
8	Lukas Nerurkar (GBR)	Trinity Racing	+ 44"
9	Rubén Fernández (ESP)	Cofidis	+ 46"
10	Attila Valter (HUN)	Team Jumbo–Visma	+ 48"

=== Stage 3 ===
26 February 2023 — Esgos to Rubiá (Alto do Castelo), 127 km (79 mi)

Stage 3 Result (1–10)
Rank	Rider	Team	Time
1	Jonas Vingegaard (DEN)	Team Jumbo–Visma	3h 19' 58"
2	Ruben Guerreiro (POR)	Movistar Team	+ 21"
3	Attila Valter (HUN)	Team Jumbo–Visma	+ 35"
4	Jesús Herrada (ESP)	Cofidis	+ 35"
5	Lorenzo Fortunato (ITA)	Eolo–Kometa	+ 40"
6	Rubén Fernández (ESP)	Cofidis	+ 44"
7	Will Barta (USA)	Movistar Team	+ 49"
8	Victor Langellotti (MON)	Burgos BH	+ 56"
9	Antonio Pedrero (ESP)	Movistar Team	+ 56"
10	Lukas Nerurkar (GBR)	Trinity Racing	+ 56"

General classification after Stage 3 (1–10)
Rank	Rider	Team	Time
1	Jonas Vingegaard (DEN)	Team Jumbo–Visma	7h 53' 08"
2	Ruben Guerreiro (POR)	Movistar Team	+ 53"
3	Jesús Herrada (ESP)	Cofidis	+ 1' 24"
4	Attila Valter (HUN)	Team Jumbo–Visma	+ 1' 29"
5	Lorenzo Fortunato (ITA)	Eolo–Kometa	+ 1' 31"
6	Rubén Fernández (ESP)	Cofidis	+ 1' 40"
7	Antonio Pedrero (ESP)	Movistar Team	+ 1' 45"
8	Victor Langellotti (MON)	Burgos BH	+ 1' 45"
9	Lukas Nerurkar (GBR)	Trinity Racing	+ 1' 53"
10	Will Barta (USA)	Movistar Team	+ 2' 02"

=== Stage 4 ===
27 February 2023 — O Milladoiro to Santiago, 18.1 km (11.2 mi) (ITT)

Stage 4 Result (1–10)
Rank	Rider	Team	Time
1	Jonas Vingegaard (DEN)	Team Jumbo–Visma	23' 47"
2	Rohan Dennis (AUS)	Team Jumbo–Visma	+ 35"
3	Will Barta (USA)	Movistar Team	+ 59"
4	Bart Lemmen (NED)	Human Powered Health	+ 1' 05"
5	Jesús Herrada (ESP)	Cofidis	+ 1' 06"
6	Carlos Canal (ESP)	Euskaltel–Euskadi	+ 1' 22"
7	Max Walker (GBR)	Trinity Racing	+ 1' 23"
8	Attila Valter (HUN)	Team Jumbo–Visma	+ 1' 24"
9	Xabier Azparren (ESP)	Euskaltel–Euskadi	+ 1' 28"
10	David De La Cruz (ESP)	Astana Qazaqstan Team	+ 1' 30"

General classification after Stage 4 (1–10)
Rank	Rider	Team	Time
1	Jonas Vingegaard (DEN)	Team Jumbo–Visma	8h 16' 55"
2	Jesús Herrada (ESP)	Cofidis	+ 2' 31"
3	Ruben Guerreiro (POR)	Movistar Team	+ 2' 48"
4	Attila Valter (HUN)	Team Jumbo–Visma	+ 2' 53"
5	Will Barta (USA)	Movistar Team	+ 3' 01"
6	Lukas Nerurkar (GBR)	Trinity Racing	+ 3' 30"
7	Simon Geschke (GER)	Cofidis	+ 3' 39"
8	David De La Cruz (ESP)	Astana Qazaqstan Team	+ 3' 40"
9	Joaquim Silva (POR)	Efapel Cycling	+ 3' 44"
10	Rubén Fernández (ESP)	Cofidis	+ 3' 53"

== Classification leadership table ==
Classification leadership by stage
Stage	Winner	General classification	Points classification	Mountains classification	Young rider classification	Team classification	Combativity award
1	Cancelled						
2	Jonas Vingegaard	Jonas Vingegaard	Sebastian Schönberger	Francesco Gavazzi	Lukas Nerurkar	Cofidis	Alejandro Ropero
3	Jonas Vingegaard	Jonas Vingegaard	Sebastian Schönberger	Jonas Vingegaard	Lukas Nerurkar	Movistar Team	
4	Jonas Vingegaard	Jonas Vingegaard	Sebastian Schönberger	Jonas Vingegaard	Lukas Nerurkar	Cofidis	
Final		Jonas Vingegaard	Sebastian Schönberger	Jonas Vingegaard	Lukas Nerurkar	Cofidis	

== Classification standings ==
Legend
Denotes the leader of the general classification	Denotes the leader of the mountains classification
Denotes the leader of the points classification	Denotes the leader of the young rider classification

=== General classification ===
Final general classification (1–10)
Rank	Rider	Team	Time
1	Jonas Vingegaard (DEN)	Team Jumbo–Visma	8h 16' 55"
2	Jesús Herrada (ESP)	Cofidis	+ 2' 31"
3	Ruben Guerreiro (POR)	Movistar Team	+ 2' 48"
4	Attila Valter (HUN)	Team Jumbo–Visma	+ 2' 53"
5	Will Barta (USA)	Movistar Team	+ 3' 01"
6	Lukas Nerurkar (GBR)	Trinity Racing	+ 3' 30"
7	Simon Geschke (GER)	Cofidis	+ 3' 39"
8	David De La Cruz (ESP)	Astana Qazaqstan Team	+ 3' 40"
9	Joaquim Silva (POR)	Efapel Cycling	+ 3' 44"
10	Rubén Fernández (ESP)	Cofidis	+ 3' 53"

=== Points classification ===
Final points classification (1–10)
Rank	Rider	Team	Points
1	Sebastian Schönberger (AUT)	Human Powered Health	131
2	Jonas Vingegaard (DEN)	Team Jumbo–Visma	80
3	Alejandro Ropero (ESP)	Electro Hiper Europa	60
4	Ruben Guerreiro (POR)	Movistar Team	50
5	Jesús Herrada (ESP)	Cofidis	36
6	Igor Arrieta (ESP)	Equipo Kern Pharma	34
7	Lorenzo Fortunato (ITA)	Eolo–Kometa	30
8	Xabier Isasa (ESP)	Euskaltel–Euskadi	30
9	Josu Etxeberria (ESP)	Caja Rural–Seguros RGA	30
10	Attila Valter (HUN)	Team Jumbo–Visma	29

=== Mountains classification ===
Final mountains classification (1–10)
Rank	Rider	Team	Points
1	Jonas Vingegaard (DEN)	Team Jumbo–Visma	15
2	Sebastian Schönberger (AUT)	Human Powered Health	14
3	Francesco Gavazzi (ITA)	Eolo–Kometa	9
4	Ruben Guerreiro (POR)	Movistar Team	9
5	Igor Arrieta (ESP)	Equipo Kern Pharma	6
6	Attila Valter (HUN)	Team Jumbo–Visma	4
7	Delio Fernández (ESP)	AP Hotels & Resorts–Tavira–SC Farense	3
8	Jesús Herrada (ESP)	Cofidis	2
9	Alex Molenaar (NED)	Electro Hiper Europa	2
10	Mattia Bais (ITA)	Eolo–Kometa	2

=== Young rider classification ===
Final young rider classification (1–10)
Rank	Rider	Team	Time
1	Lukas Nerurkar (GBR)	Trinity Racing	8h 20' 25"
2	Pelayo Sanchez (ESP)	Burgos BH	+ 38"
3	Carlos Canal (ESP)	Euskaltel–Euskadi	+ 49"
4	Max Walker (GBR)	Trinity Racing	+ 1' 01"
5	Igor Arrieta (ESP)	Equipo Kern Pharma	+ 1' 13"
6	Enekoitz Azparren (ESP)	Euskaltel–Euskadi	+ 2' 59"
7	Francisco Guerreiro (POR)	Efapel Cycling	+ 3' 22"
8	Karel Vacek (CZE)	Team Corratec	+ 3' 29"
9	Oliver Rees (GBR)	Trinity Racing	+ 3' 46"
10	Alejandro Franco (ESP)	Burgos BH	+ 4' 20"

=== Team classification ===
Final team classification (1–10)
Rank	Team	Time
1	Cofidis	25h 00' 35"
2	Movistar Team	+ 25"
3	Team Jumbo–Visma	+ 3' 44"
4	Euskaltel–Euskadi	+ 3' 44"
5	Trinity Racing	+ 5' 00"
6	Equipo Kern Pharma	+ 5' 05"
7	Burgos BH	+ 5' 27"
8	Efapel Cycling	+ 8' 39"
9	Caja Rural–Seguros RGA	+ 10' 56"
10	Astana Qazaqstan Team	+ 13' 00"
