= 2024 Volta a la Comunitat Valenciana =

2024 UCI ProSeries

Race details
- Dates: 31 January – 4 February 2024
- Stages: 5
- Distance: 759 km (471.6 mi)
- Winning time: 17h 52' 34"

Results
Jersey awarded to the overall winner	Winner	Brandon McNulty (USA)	(UAE Team Emirates)
	Second	Santiago Buitrago (COL)	(Team Bahrain Victorious)
	Third	Aleksandr Vlasov	(Bora–Hansgrohe)
Jersey awarded to the points classification winner	Points	Jonathan Milan (ITA)	(Lidl–Trek)
Jersey awarded to the mountains classification winner	Mountains	Mikel Bizkarra (ESP)	(Euskaltel–Euskadi)
Jersey awarded to the youth classification winner	Youth	Santiago Buitrago (COL)	(Team Bahrain Victorious)
	Team	Team Bahrain Victorious	

The 2024 Volta a la Comunitat Valenciana (English: Tour of the Valencian Community) was a road cycling stage race that took place from 31 January to 4 February 2024 in the Spanish autonomous community of Valencia. The race was rated as a category 2.Pro event on the 2024 UCI ProSeries calendars, and was the 75th edition of the Volta a la Comunitat Valenciana.

== Teams ==
Seven of the eighteen UCI WorldTeams, nine UCI ProTeams and two UCI Continental teams make up the nineteen teams that participated in the race. All teams entered a full squad of seven riders. In total, 125 riders started the race, as Fabio Felline of Lidl–Trek did not start the first stage.

UCI WorldTeams

- Bora–Hansgrohe
- Intermarché–Wanty
- Lidl–Trek
- Movistar Team
- Team Bahrain Victorious
- Team Jayco–AlUla
- UAE Team Emirates

UCI ProTeams

- Bingoal WB
- Burgos BH
- Caja Rural–Seguros RGA
- Equipo Kern Pharma
- Euskaltel–Euskadi
- Q36.5 Pro Cycling Team
- Team Novo Nordisk
- Polti–Kometa
- VF Group–Bardiani–CSF–Faizanè

UCI Continental teams

- Illes Balears Arabay Cycling
- Project Echelon Racing

== Route ==
Stage characteristics and winners
Stage	Date	Course	Distance	Type	Stage winner
1	31 January	Benicasim to Castellón de la Plana	167 km (104 mi)	Hilly stage	Alessandro Tonelli (ITA)
2	1 February	Canals to Mancom de la Valldigna	162.7 km (101.1 mi)	Mountain stage	Matej Mohorič (SLO)
3	2 February	San Vicente del Raspeig to Orihuela	161.3 km (100.2 mi)	Hilly stage	Jonathan Milan (ITA)
4	3 February	Teulada to La Vall d'Ebo	175.2 km (108.9 mi)	Medium mountain stage	Brandon McNulty (USA)
5	4 February	Bétera to Valencia	93 km (58 mi)	Hilly stage	Will Barta (USA)
Total			759 km (472 mi)		

== Stages ==
=== Stage 1 ===
31 January 2024 — Benicasim to Castellón de la Plana, 167 km (104 mi)

Stage 1 Result (1–10)
Rank	Rider	Team	Time
1	Alessandro Tonelli (ITA)	VF Group–Bardiani–CSF–Faizanè	4h 04' 34"
2	Manuele Tarozzi (ITA)	VF Group–Bardiani–CSF–Faizanè	+ 0"
3	Oier Lazkano (ESP)	Movistar Team	+ 1' 09"
4	Alex Molenaar (NED)	Illes Balears Arabay Cycling	+ 1' 12"
5	Jonathan Milan (ITA)	Lidl–Trek	+ 1' 19"
6	Michael Matthews (AUS)	Team Jayco–AlUla	+ 1' 19"
7	Matej Mohorič (SLO)	Team Bahrain Victorious	+ 1' 19"
8	Filippo Fiorelli (ITA)	VF Group–Bardiani–CSF–Faizanè	+ 1' 19"
9	Pelayo Sánchez (ESP)	Movistar Team	+ 1' 19"
10	Giovanni Aleotti (ITA)	Bora–Hansgrohe	+ 1' 19"

General classification after Stage 1 (1–10)
Rank	Rider	Team	Time
1	Alessandro Tonelli (ITA)	VF Group–Bardiani–CSF–Faizanè	4h 04' 34"
2	Manuele Tarozzi (ITA)	VF Group–Bardiani–CSF–Faizanè	+ 3"
3	Oier Lazkano (ESP)	Movistar Team	+ 1' 17"
4	Alex Molenaar (NED)	Illes Balears Arabay Cycling	+ 1' 20"
5	Francisco Muñoz (ESP)	Polti–Kometa	+ 1' 29"
6	Jonathan Milan (ITA)	Lidl–Trek	+ 1' 31"
7	Michael Matthews (AUS)	Team Jayco–AlUla	+ 1' 31"
8	Matej Mohorič (SLO)	Team Bahrain Victorious	+ 1' 31"
9	Filippo Fiorelli (ITA)	VF Group–Bardiani–CSF–Faizanè	+ 1' 31"
10	Pelayo Sánchez (ESP)	Movistar Team	+ 1' 31"

=== Stage 2 ===
1 February 2024 — Canals to Mancom de la Valldigna, 162.7 km (101.1 mi)

Stage 2 Result (1–10)
Rank	Rider	Team	Time
1	Matej Mohorič (SLO)	Team Bahrain Victorious	3h 47' 47"
2	Giovanni Lonardi (ITA)	Polti–Kometa	+ 13"
3	Simone Consonni (ITA)	Lidl–Trek	+ 13"
4	Filippo Fiorelli (ITA)	VF Group–Bardiani–CSF–Faizanè	+ 13"
5	Davide De Pretto (ITA)	Team Jayco–AlUla	+ 13"
6	Michael Matthews (AUS)	Team Jayco–AlUla	+ 13"
7	Marco Tizza (ITA)	Bingoal WB	+ 13"
8	Tyler Stites (USA)	Project Echelon Racing	+ 13"
9	Rainer Kepplinger (AUT)	Team Bahrain Victorious	+ 13"
10	Orluis Aular (VEN)	Caja Rural–Seguros RGA	+ 13"

General classification after Stage 2 (1–10)
Rank	Rider	Team	Time
1	Alessandro Tonelli (ITA)	VF Group–Bardiani–CSF–Faizanè	7h 52' 22"
2	Matej Mohorič (SLO)	Team Bahrain Victorious	+ 1' 08"
3	Felix Großschartner (AUT)	UAE Team Emirates	+ 1' 28"
4	Santiago Buitrago (COL)	Team Bahrain Victorious	+ 1' 29"
5	Aleksandr Vlasov	Bora–Hansgrohe	+ 1' 30"
6	Filippo Fiorelli (ITA)	VF Group–Bardiani–CSF–Faizanè	+ 1' 31"
7	Michael Matthews (AUS)	Team Jayco–AlUla	+ 1' 31"
8	Paul Double (GBR)	Polti–Kometa	+ 1' 31"
9	Giovanni Aleotti (ITA)	Bora–Hansgrohe	+ 1' 31"
10	Rainer Kepplinger (AUT)	Team Bahrain Victorious	+ 1' 31"

=== Stage 3 ===
2 February 2024 — San Vicente del Raspeig to Orihuela, 161.3 km (100.2 mi)

Stage 3 Result (1–10)
Rank	Rider	Team	Time
1	Jonathan Milan (ITA)	Lidl–Trek	3h 42' 04"
2	Arne Marit (BEL)	Intermarché–Wanty	+ 0"
3	Giovanni Lonardi (ITA)	Polti–Kometa	+ 0"
4	Filippo Fiorelli (ITA)	VF Group–Bardiani–CSF–Faizanè	+ 0"
5	Simone Consonni (ITA)	Lidl–Trek	+ 0"
6	Alexander Salby (DEN)	Bingoal WB	+ 0"
7	Matyáš Kopecký (CZE)	Team Novo Nordisk	+ 0"
8	Guillermo Thomas Silva (URU)	Caja Rural–Seguros RGA	+ 0"
9	Orluis Aular (VEN)	Caja Rural–Seguros RGA	+ 0"
10	Tyler Stites (USA)	Project Echelon Racing	+ 0"

General classification after Stage 3 (1–10)
Rank	Rider	Team	Time
1	Alessandro Tonelli (ITA)	VF Group–Bardiani–CSF–Faizanè	11h 34' 26"
2	Matej Mohorič (SLO)	Team Bahrain Victorious	+ 1' 08"
3	Felix Großschartner (AUT)	UAE Team Emirates	+ 1' 28"
4	Santiago Buitrago (COL)	Team Bahrain Victorious	+ 1' 29"
5	Aleksandr Vlasov	Bora–Hansgrohe	+ 1' 30"
6	Filippo Fiorelli (ITA)	VF Group–Bardiani–CSF–Faizanè	+ 1' 31"
7	Paul Double (GBR)	Polti–Kometa	+ 1' 31"
8	Giovanni Aleotti (ITA)	Bora–Hansgrohe	+ 1' 31"
9	Joan Bou (ESP)	Euskaltel–Euskadi	+ 1' 31"
10	Einer Rubio (COL)	Movistar Team	+ 1' 31"

=== Stage 4 ===
3 February 2024 — Teulada to La Vall d'Ebo, 175.2 km (108.9 mi)

Stage 4 Result (1–10)
Rank	Rider	Team	Time
1	Brandon McNulty (USA)	UAE Team Emirates	4h 08' 21"
2	Santiago Buitrago (COL)	Team Bahrain Victorious	+ 12"
3	Aleksandr Vlasov	Bora–Hansgrohe	+ 12"
4	Pello Bilbao (ESP)	Team Bahrain Victorious	+ 24"
5	Jai Hindley (AUS)	Bora–Hansgrohe	+ 24"
6	Felix Großschartner (AUT)	UAE Team Emirates	+ 29"
7	Rainer Kepplinger (AUT)	Team Bahrain Victorious	+ 44"
8	Javier Romo (ESP)	Movistar Team	+ 47"
9	Welay Hagos Berhe (ETH)	Team Jayco–AlUla	+ 48"
10	Patrick Konrad (AUT)	Lidl–Trek	+ 1' 01"

General classification after Stage 4 (1–10)
Rank	Rider	Team	Time
1	Brandon McNulty (USA)	UAE Team Emirates	15h 44' 08"
2	Santiago Buitrago (COL)	Team Bahrain Victorious	+ 14"
3	Aleksandr Vlasov	Bora–Hansgrohe	+ 17"
4	Alessandro Tonelli (ITA)	VF Group–Bardiani–CSF–Faizanè	+ 20"
5	Jai Hindley (AUS)	Bora–Hansgrohe	+ 34"
6	Pello Bilbao (ESP)	Team Bahrain Victorious	+ 34"
7	Felix Großschartner (AUT)	UAE Team Emirates	+ 36"
8	Rainer Kepplinger (AUT)	Team Bahrain Victorious	+ 54"
9	Javier Romo (ESP)	Movistar Team	+ 57"
10	Welay Hagos Berhe (ETH)	Team Jayco–AlUla	+ 58"

=== Stage 5 ===
4 February 2024 — Bétera to Valencia, 93 km (58 mi)

Stage 5 Result (1–10)
Rank	Rider	Team	Time
1	Will Barta (USA)	Movistar Team	2h 08' 18"
2	Jonathan Milan (ITA)	Lidl–Trek	+ 8"
3	Vito Braet (BEL)	Intermarché–Wanty	+ 8"
4	Orluis Aular (VEN)	Caja Rural–Seguros RGA	+ 8"
5	Matej Mohorič (SLO)	Team Bahrain Victorious	+ 8"
6	Davide De Pretto (ITA)	Team Jayco–AlUla	+ 8"
7	Tyler Stites (USA)	Project Echelon Racing	+ 8"
8	Johan Meens (BEL)	Bingoal WB	+ 8"
9	Aleksandr Vlasov	Bora–Hansgrohe	+ 8"
10	Jan Christen (SUI)	UAE Team Emirates	+ 8"

General classification after Stage 5 (1–10)
Rank	Rider	Team	Time
1	Brandon McNulty (USA)	UAE Team Emirates	17h 52' 34"
2	Santiago Buitrago (COL)	Team Bahrain Victorious	+ 14"
3	Aleksandr Vlasov	Bora–Hansgrohe	+ 17"
4	Alessandro Tonelli (ITA)	VF Group–Bardiani–CSF–Faizanè	+ 20"
5	Jai Hindley (AUS)	Bora–Hansgrohe	+ 34"
6	Pello Bilbao (ESP)	Team Bahrain Victorious	+ 34"
7	Felix Großschartner (AUT)	UAE Team Emirates	+ 36"
8	Rainer Kepplinger (AUT)	Team Bahrain Victorious	+ 54"
9	Javier Romo (ESP)	Movistar Team	+ 57"
10	Welay Hagos Berhe (ETH)	Team Jayco–AlUla	+ 58"

== Classification leadership table ==
Classification leadership by stage
Stage	Winner	General classification	Points classification	Mountains classification	Young rider classification	Team classification
1	Alessandro Tonelli	Alessandro Tonelli	Alessandro Tonelli	Gorka Sorarrain	Oier Lazkano	VF Group–Bardiani–CSF–Faizanè
2	Matej Mohorič	Alessandro Tonelli	Matej Mohorič	Gorka Sorarrain	Santiago Buitrago	VF Group–Bardiani–CSF–Faizanè
3	Jonathan Milan	Alessandro Tonelli	Jonathan Milan	Gorka Sorarrain	Santiago Buitrago	VF Group–Bardiani–CSF–Faizanè
4	Brandon McNulty	Brandon McNulty	Jonathan Milan	Mikel Bizkarra	Santiago Buitrago	Team Bahrain Victorious
5	Will Barta	Brandon McNulty	Jonathan Milan	Mikel Bizkarra	Santiago Buitrago	Team Bahrain Victorious
Final		Brandon McNulty	Jonathan Milan	Mikel Bizkarra	Santiago Buitrago	Team Bahrain Victorious

== Classification standings ==
Legend
Denotes the winner of the general classification	Denotes the winner of the points classification
Denotes the winner of the mountains classification	Denotes the winner of the young rider classification

=== General classification ===
Final general classification (1–10)
Rank	Rider	Team	Time
1	Brandon McNulty (USA)	UAE Team Emirates	17h 52' 34"
2	Santiago Buitrago (COL)	Team Bahrain Victorious	+ 14"
3	Aleksandr Vlasov	Bora–Hansgrohe	+ 17"
4	Alessandro Tonelli (ITA)	VF Group–Bardiani–CSF–Faizanè	+ 20"
5	Jai Hindley (AUS)	Bora–Hansgrohe	+ 34"
6	Pello Bilbao (ESP)	Team Bahrain Victorious	+ 34"
7	Felix Großschartner (AUT)	UAE Team Emirates	+ 36"
8	Rainer Kepplinger (AUT)	Team Bahrain Victorious	+ 54"
9	Javier Romo (ESP)	Movistar Team	+ 57"
10	Welay Hagos Berhe (ETH)	Team Jayco–AlUla	+ 58"

=== Points classification ===
Final points classification (1–10)
Rank	Rider	Team	Points
1	Jonathan Milan (ITA)	Lidl–Trek	57
2	Matej Mohorič (SLO)	Team Bahrain Victorious	48
3	Filippo Fiorelli (ITA)	VF Group–Bardiani–CSF–Faizanè	36
4	Giovanni Lonardi (ITA)	Polti–Kometa	36
5	Will Barta (USA)	Movistar Team	29
6	Simone Consonni (ITA)	Lidl–Trek	28
7	Orluis Aular (VEN)	Caja Rural–Seguros RGA	27
8	Brandon McNulty (USA)	UAE Team Emirates	25
9	Alessandro Tonelli (ITA)	VF Group–Bardiani–CSF–Faizanè	25
10	Santiago Buitrago (COL)	Team Bahrain Victorious	24

=== Mountains classification ===
Final mountains classification (1–10)
Rank	Rider	Team	Points
1	Mikel Bizkarra (ESP)	Euskaltel–Euskadi	18
2	Gorka Sorarrain (ESP)	Caja Rural–Seguros RGA	15
3	Will Barta (USA)	Movistar Team	12
4	Jokin Murguialday (ESP)	Caja Rural–Seguros RGA	12
5	Brandon McNulty (USA)	UAE Team Emirates	10
6	Santiago Buitrago (COL)	Team Bahrain Victorious	10
7	Aleksandr Vlasov	Bora–Hansgrohe	8
8	Pello Bilbao (ESP)	Team Bahrain Victorious	8
9	Filippo Fiorelli (ITA)	VF Group–Bardiani–CSF–Faizanè	8
10	Manuele Tarozzi (ITA)	VF Group–Bardiani–CSF–Faizanè	6

=== Young rider classification ===
Final young rider classification (1–10)
Rank	Rider	Team	Time
1	Santiago Buitrago (COL)	Team Bahrain Victorious	17h 52' 48"
2	Javier Romo (ESP)	Movistar Team	+ 43"
3	Welay Hagos Berhe (ETH)	Team Jayco–AlUla	+ 44"
4	Giovanni Aleotti (ITA)	Bora–Hansgrohe	+ 1' 06"
5	Davide Piganzoli (ITA)	Polti–Kometa	+ 1' 08"
6	Igor Arrieta (ESP)	UAE Team Emirates	+ 1' 08"
7	Filippo Zana (ITA)	Team Jayco–AlUla	+ 1' 22"
8	Davide De Pretto (ITA)	Team Jayco–AlUla	+ 1' 49"
9	Alex Molenaar (NED)	Illes Balears Arabay Cycling	+ 4' 12"
10	Pablo Castrillo (ESP)	Equipo Kern Pharma	+ 5' 12"

=== Teams classification ===
Final team classification (1–10)
Rank	Team	Time
1	Team Bahrain Victorious	53h 39' 19"
2	(United Arab Emirates) UAE Team Emirates	+ 34"
3	(Germany) Bora–Hansgrohe	+ 39"
4	(Australia) Team Jayco–AlUla	+ 3' 00"
5	(Italy) Polti–Kometa	+ 3' 31"
6	(Italy) VF Group–Bardiani–CSF–Faizanè	+ 5' 06"
7	(Spain) Euskaltel–Euskadi	+ 5' 45"
8	(Spain) Movistar Team	+ 6' 00"
9	(Spain) Burgos BH	+ 11' 44"
10	(Spain) Caja Rural–Seguros RGA	+ 13' 52"
