= Rainer Kepplinger =

Austrian cyclist (born 1997)

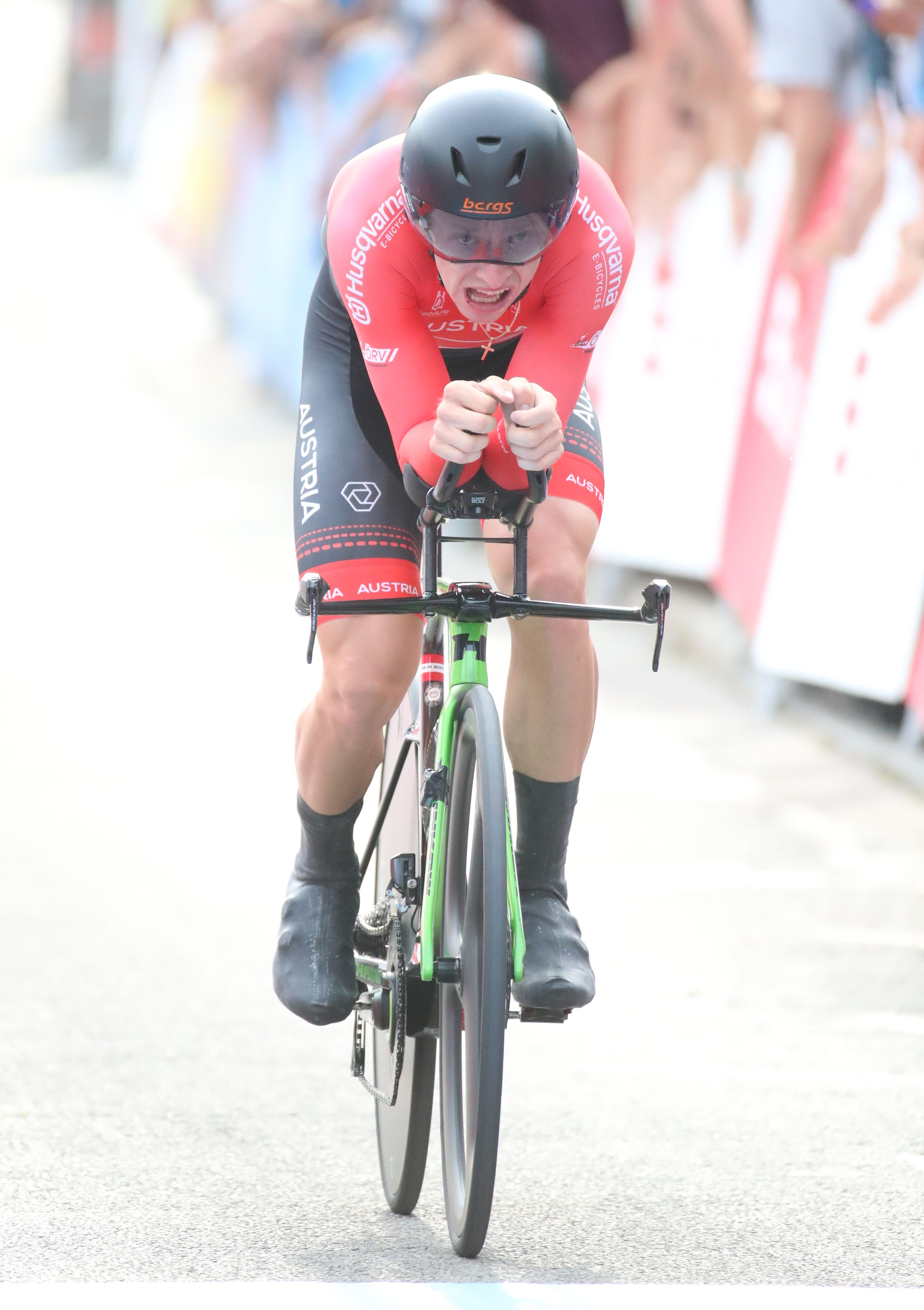
- Kepplinger competing in the time trial at the 2022 European Road Championships

Personal information
- Born: 19 August 1997 (age 29) Austria

Cycling career
- Sport: Cycling
- Current team: Team Bahrain Victorious
- Discipline: Road
- Role: Rider

Professional teams
- 2021–2022: Hrinkow Advarics Cycleang
- 2023–: Team Bahrain Victorious

Rainer Kepplinger (born 19 August 1997) is an Austrian professional racing cyclist, who currently rides for UCI WorldTeam Team Bahrain Victorious.

== Career ==
At the 2022 UCI Esports World Championships, Kepplinger rode in the elite road race for Austria where he got into the early break but was caught on the final climb by the peloton, still managing to finish seventh. Kepplinger's first victory came from winning the Kirschblütenrennen (National event) in a two-man sprint to the line with Matthias Reutimann. Kepplinger attacked solo with 30 km to go but Reutimann was able to catch up and the pair finished 54 seconds ahead of the chasers.

In June 2022 at the Oberösterreich Rundfahrt, he won the final stage ahead of defending champion Alexis Guérin, securing his first overall victory in the race. In late July a criterium was held, the Altstadtcriterium, which Geraint Thomas won, while Kepplinger finished 2 seconds behind Thomas in seventh place.

On 12 August 2022 it was announced that Kepplinger would join UCI WorldTeam Team Bahrain Victorious on a three-year contract from 2023.

== Major results ==
2021
5th Time trial, National Road Championships
2022
1st Overall Oberösterreich Rundfahrt

1st Stage 3

2nd Overall Tour of Malopolska
2nd Time trial, National Road Championships
5th Overall Belgrade Banjaluka
7th UCI Esports World Championships
2024
8th Overall Volta a la Comunitat Valenciana
2025
5th Overall AlUla Tour
2026
5th Overall Okolo Slovenska

=== Grand Tour general classification results timeline ===
Grand Tour	2024
Giro d'Italia	64
Tour de France	—
Vuelta a España	DNF

Legend
—	Did not compete
DNF	Did not finish
