= Alessandro Tonelli =

Italian bicycle racer

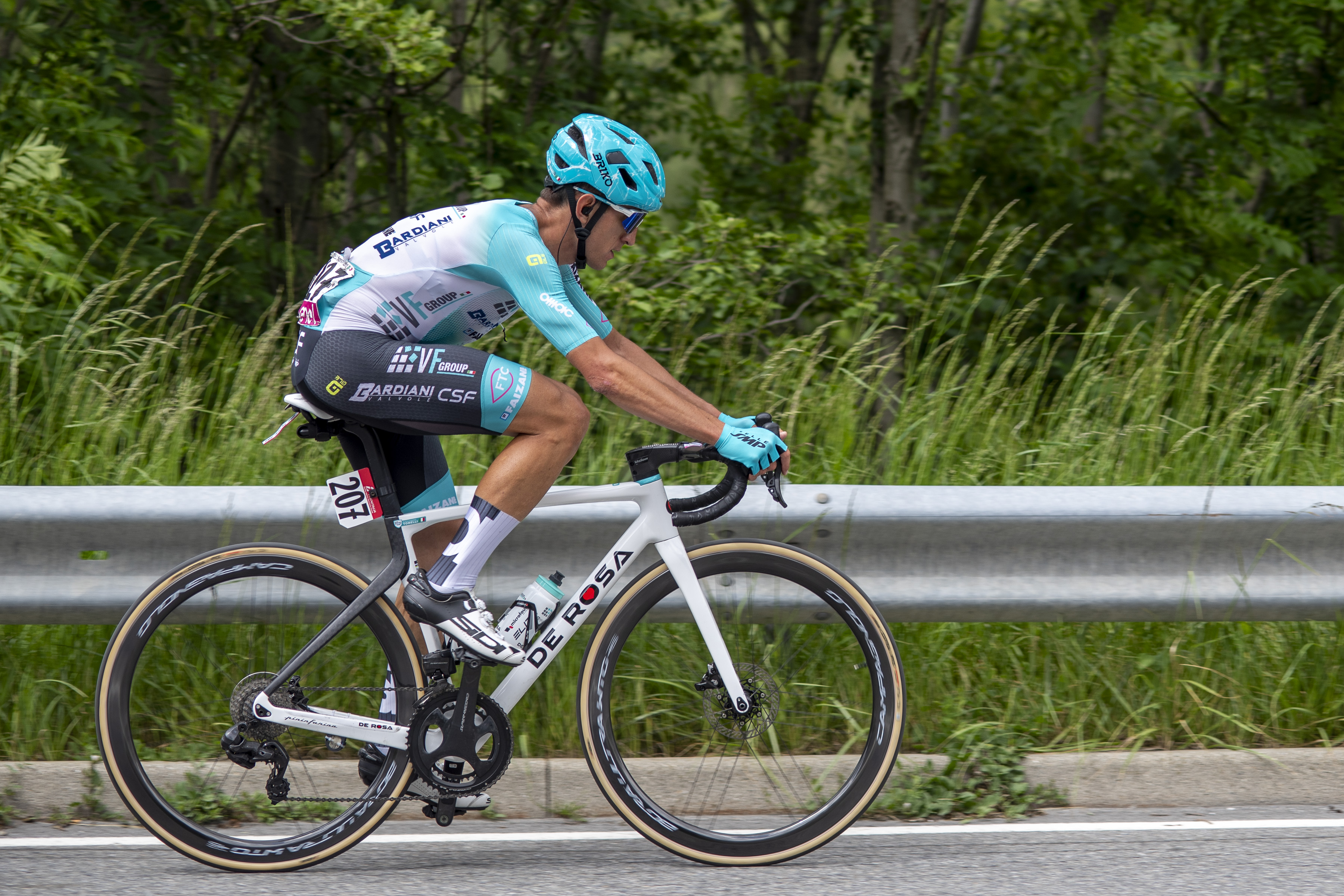
- Tonelli at the 2024 Giro d'Italia

Personal information
- Full name: Alessandro Tonelli
- Born: 29 May 1992 (age 34) Brescia, Italy
- Height: 1.76 m (5 ft 9 in)
- Weight: 67 kg (148 lb)

Cycling career
- Sport: Cycling
- Current team: Team Polti VisitMalta
- Discipline: Road
- Role: Rider

Amateur teams
- 2011: Gavardo Tecmor
- 2012–2014: Zalf–Euromobil–Désirée–Fior

Professional teams
- 2015–2024: Bardiani–CSF
- 2025–: Team Polti VisitMalta

Alessandro Tonelli (born 29 May 1992 in Brescia) is an Italian cyclist, who currently rides for UCI ProTeam Team Polti VisitMalta. In May 2018, he was named in the startlist for the 2018 Giro d'Italia.

== Major results ==
2010
4th Memorial Davide Fardelli Juniors
2012
4th Trofeo Franco Balestra
2013
1st Gran Premio Carmine
1st Trofeo Carla Bruno e Cadirola
4th Gran Premio San Giuseppe
2014
1st Trofeo Matteotti U23
1st Gran Premio Sportivi di San Vigilio di Concesio
1st Memorial Morgan Capretta
2nd Industria del Premio of Garn Cuoio e delle Pelli
3rd Giro del Montalbano
8th GP Capodarco
2018 (1 pro win)
1st Stage 4 Tour of Croatia
2021
3rd Grand Prix Alanya
2022
4th Grand Prix Alanya
2023
8th Clàssica Comunitat Valenciana 1969
8th Trofeo Serra de Tramuntana
2024 (1)
4th Overall Volta a la Comunitat Valenciana

1st Stage 1

10th Coppa Agostoni

=== Grand Tour general classification results timeline ===
Grand Tour	2018	2019	2020	2021	2022	2023	2024
Giro d'Italia	DNF	—	51	—	52	42	41
Tour de France	—	—	—	—	—	—	
Vuelta a España	—	—	—	—	—	—	

Legend
—	Did not compete
DNF	Did not finish
