= Sebastian Schönberger =

Austrian cyclist

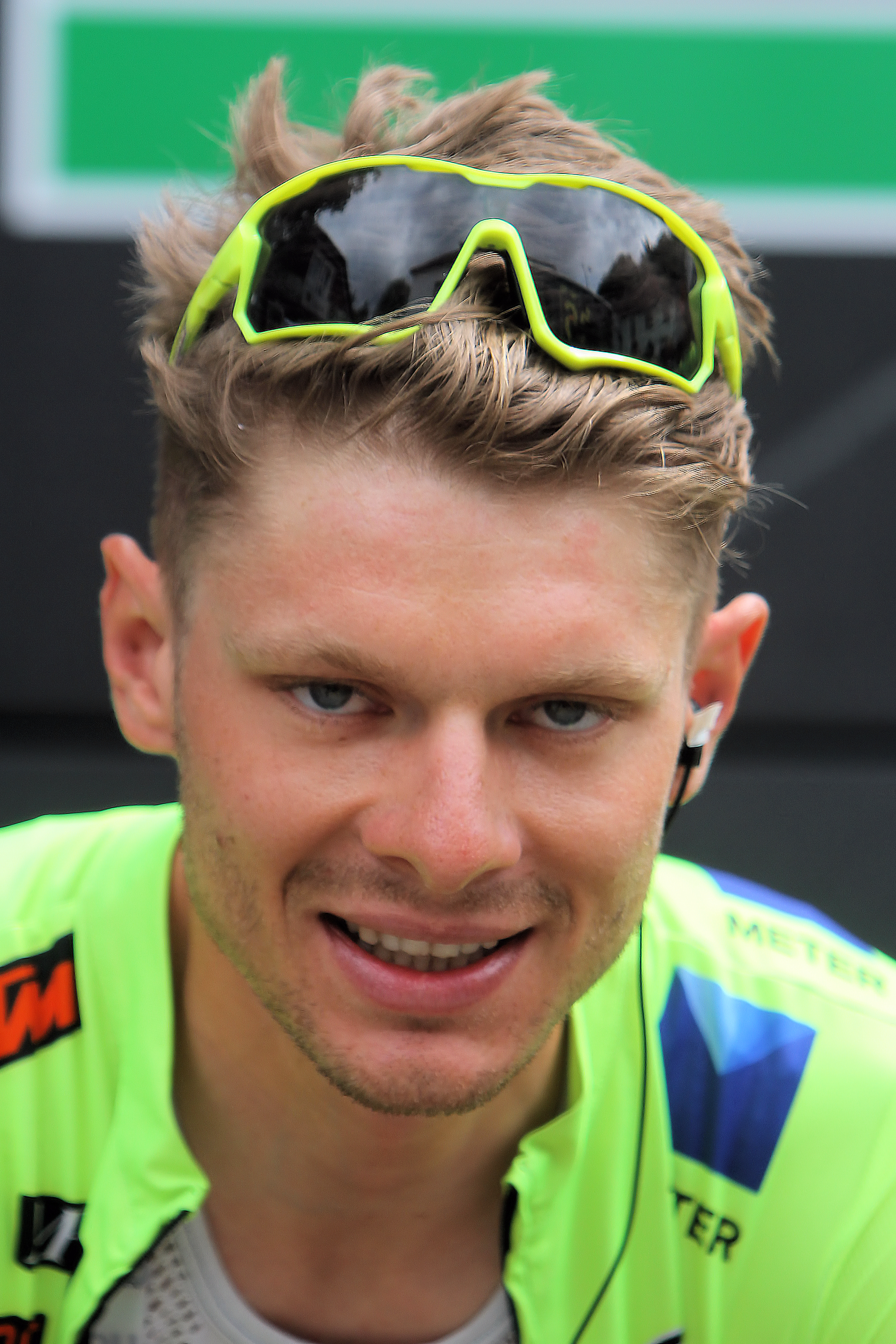
- Schönberger in 2019

Personal information
- Full name: Sebastian Schönberger
- Born: 14 May 1994 (age 32) Schalchen, Austria
- Height: 1.82 m (6 ft 0 in)
- Weight: 64 kg (141 lb)

Cycling career
- Sport: Cycling
- Current team: Team Felt–Felbermayr
- Discipline: Road
- Role: Rider

Professional teams
- 2013–2014: Gourmetfein–Simplon
- 2015–2017: Tirol Cycling Team
- 2018: Hrinkow Advarics Cycleang
- 2018–2019: Wilier Triestina–Selle Italia
- 2020–2022: B&B Hotels–Vital Concept
- 2023: Human Powered Health
- 2024–: Team Felt–Felbermayr

Sebastian Schönberger (born 14 May 1994) is an Austrian racing cyclist, who currently rides for UCI Continental team Team Felt–Felbermayr. He rode at the 2013 UCI Road World Championships.

== Major results ==
=== Gravel ===
2023
10th UCI World Championships

=== Road ===
2014
3rd Road race, National Under-23 Championships
6th Ronde van Vlaanderen Beloften
2016
1st Mountains classification, Oberösterreichrundfahrt
8th Overall East Bohemia Tour
2018
5th Overall Czech Cycling Tour
2019
3rd Overall Tour of Albania

1st Mountains classification

4th Road race, National Championships
2020
5th Road race, National Championships
2021
3rd Tour de Vendée
6th Overall Tour de Savoie Mont-Blanc
6th Boucles de l'Aulne
2022
6th Boucles de l'Aulne
2023
1st Mountains classification, Tour de Hongrie
1st Points classification, O Gran Camiño

==== Grand Tour general classification results timeline ====
Grand Tour	2022
Giro d'Italia	—
Tour de France	33
Vuelta a España	—

Legend
—	Did not compete
DNF	Did not finish
