= Filippo Fiorelli =

Italian cyclist (born 1994)

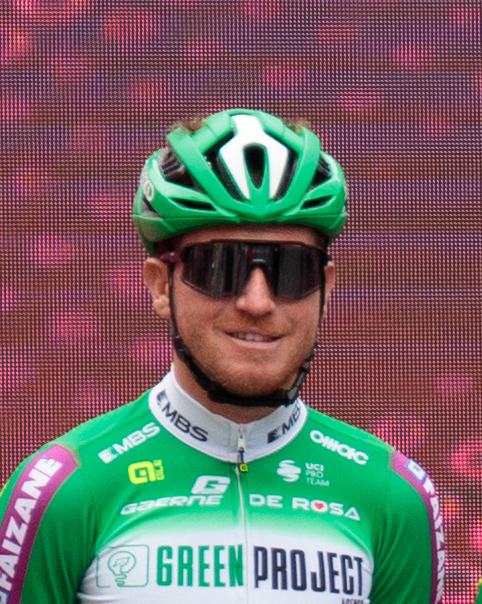
- Fiorelli at the 2023 Giro d'Italia

Personal information
- Born: 19 November 1994 (age 31) Palermo, Italy

Cycling career
- Sport: Cycling
- Current team: Visma–Lease a Bike
- Discipline: Road
- Role: Rider

Amateur teams
- 2014: CP85
- 2015: Brogio
- 2016: Delio Gallina Colosio Eurofeed
- 2017: Beltrami–Argon 18
- 2018–2019: Gragnano Sporting Club
- 2019: Nippo–Vini Fantini–Faizanè (stagiaire)

Professional teams
- 2020–2025: Bardiani–CSF–Faizanè
- 2026-: Visma–Lease a Bike

Major wins
- Grand Tours Giro d'Italia Intergiro classification (2024) One-day races and Classics Tro-Bro Léon (2026)

Filippo Fiorelli (born 19 November 1994) is an Italian cyclist, who rides for Visma–Lease a Bike as of the 2026 road season. Professional since 2020, he has competed in six editions of the Giro d'Italia.

== Major results ==
2015
3rd GP Capodarco
2016
5th Gran Premio Sportivi di Poggiana
2017
9th Trofeo Città di Brescia
2019
1st Overall Tour of Albania

1st Points classification
1st Stage 4

2020
10th Overall Sibiu Cycling Tour
2021
1st Poreč Trophy
2nd GP Adria Mobil
2nd International Rhodes Grand Prix
5th Overall Belgrade Banjaluka
8th Coppa Bernocchi
8th Clàssica Comunitat Valenciana 1969
2022 (1 pro win)
1st Stage 1 Sibiu Cycling Tour
5th Bretagne Classic
7th Clàssica Comunitat Valenciana 1969
7th Volta Limburg Classic
8th Trofeo Playa de Palma
2023
4th Per sempre Alfredo
10th Veneto Classic
10th Trofeo Matteotti
2024
7th Brussels Cycling Classic
8th Giro del Veneto
Giro d'Italia

1st Intergiro classification
Held after Stage 2
Combativity award Stage 3

2025
5th Overall Giro d'Abruzzo

1st Points classification

6th Trofeo Città di Brescia
8th Route Adélie de Vitré
8th Giro della Città Metropolitana di Reggio Calabria
10th Overall Tour de Wallonie
10th Trofeo Serra Tramuntana
2026 (1)
1st Tro-Bro Léon
10th Overall Renewi Tour

=== Grand Tour general classification results timeline ===
Grand Tour	2020	2021	2022	2023	2024	2025
Giro d'Italia	109	108	DNF	114	77	89
Tour de France	—	—	—	—	—	—
Vuelta a España	—	—	—	—	—	—

Legend
—	Did not compete
DNF	Did not finish
