= O Milladoiro =

Spanish town

Coordinates: 42°50′46″N 8°34′47″W

O Milladoiro is a Spanish town located in the parish of Viduido, in the municipality of Ames, in the province of A Coruña, Galicia. It currently has 13,352 inhabitants.

== Location ==
It is the most important nucleus of the municipality of Ames, housing half of its inhabitants and is located just three kilometers from the center of Santiago de Compostela. It limits with the villages of A Grela, Coira and Bentín. It also borders the municipality of Teo in the lower part of Rosalía de Castro avenue.

== Place name ==
There are several theories about the name of the town. The most common account is that the name recalls that it was the last town before reaching Santiago along the Portuguese Camino de Santiago. It was the place where the pilgrims humiliated themselves, knelt down, seeing the cathedral for the first time, it was humiliated. And it was also an emblematic site.

Another theory warns about the possibility that O Milladoiro is a deformation of o miradoiro, which in the local language, Galician, translates as the viewpoint. Due to its orography, O Milladoiro has a hill from which you can see the cathedral of Santiago de Compostela and a large part of the city. Hence the possible designation of viewpoint.

In addition, in Galicia a mound made up of small stones piled up over time by pilgrims and pilgrims heading to a religious sanctuary is called "milladoiro".
