= Will Barta =

American cyclist

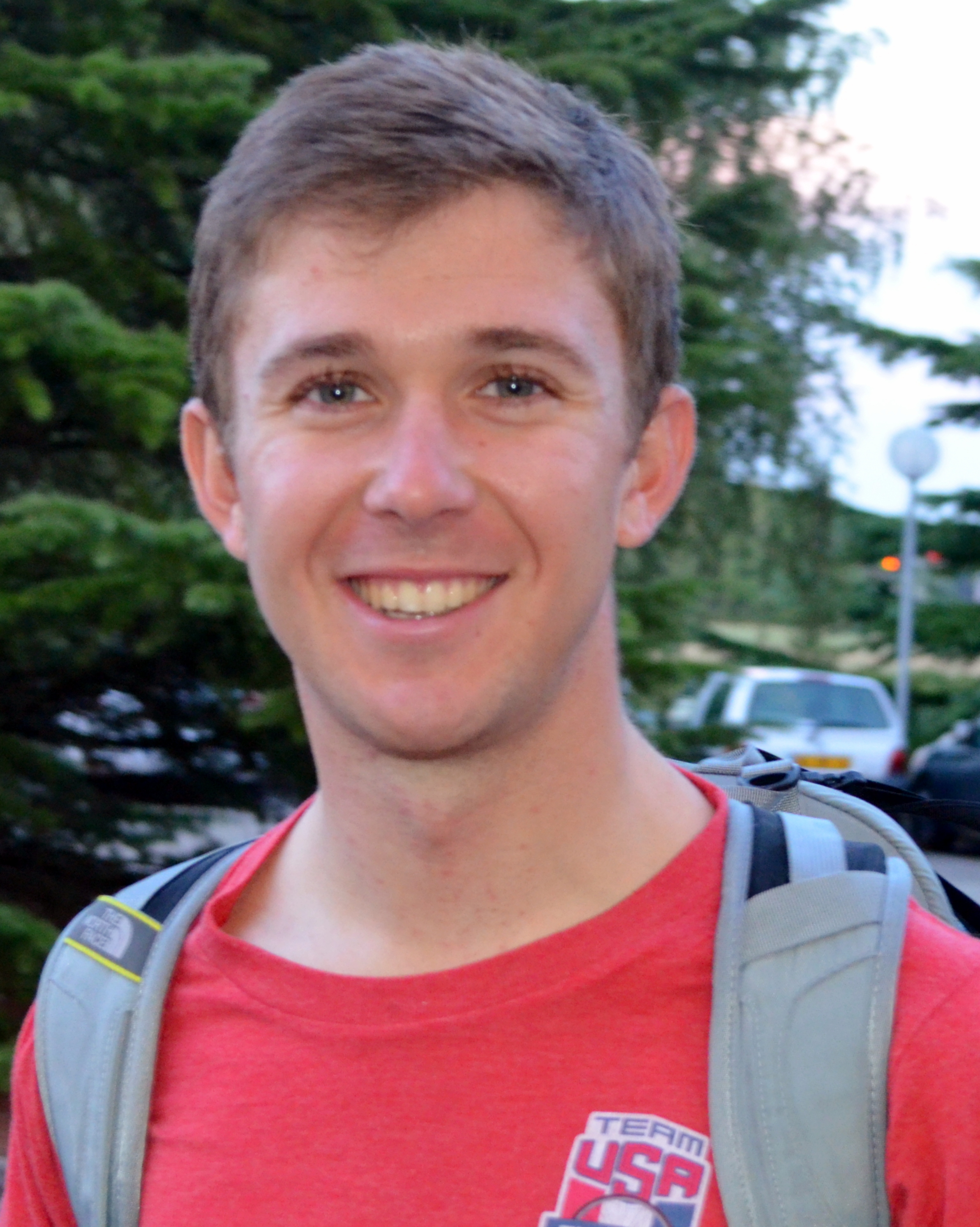
- Barta in 2015.

Personal information
- Full name: William Barta
- Born: January 4, 1996 (age 30) Boise, Idaho, United States
- Height: 1.80 m (5 ft 11 in)
- Weight: 61 kg (134 lb)

Cycling career
- Sport: Cycling
- Current team: Tudor Pro Cycling Team
- Discipline: Road
- Role: Rider

Professional teams
- 2015–2018: Axeon Cycling Team
- 2019–2020: CCC Team
- 2021: EF Education–Nippo
- 2022–2025: Movistar Team

William Barta (born January 4, 1996) is an American professional road racing cyclist, who currently rides for UCI ProTeam Tudor Pro Cycling.

== Career ==
Barta was the second youngest rider in the 2016 Tour of California. He rode in the 2019 Vuelta a España, his first Grand Tour. He also rode the 2020 Vuelta, finishing 22nd overall. He recorded a second-place finish on stage 13, an individual time trial; he had held the best time until Primož Roglič bettered his time by one second. Barta's first professional win came in the fifth and final stage of the 2024 Volta a la Comunitat Valenciana, when Barta was part of a breakaway group and then made a solo attack on the steepest slopes of La Frontera climb, riding solo for over 50 km to take the stage victory.

== Major results ==
2013
5th Overall Tour de l'Abitibi

1st Young rider classification
1st Stage 3 (ITT)

2014
2nd Time trial, National Junior Road Championships
3rd Overall Course de la Paix Juniors
3rd Overall Tour du Pays de Vaud

1st Stage 1

4th Overall Tour de l'Abitibi
6th Overall Trofeo Karlsberg

1st Points classification
1st Stage 2a

2015
8th Overall Tour de Bretagne
2016
7th Trofeo Banca Popolare di Vicenza
2017
2nd Time trial, National Under-23 Road Championships
4th Time trial, National Road Championships
4th Liège–Bastogne–Liège U23
9th Overall Le Triptyque des Monts et Châteaux
9th Overall Flèche du Sud
10th Overall Tour de Bretagne
2018
3rd Overall Le Triptyque des Monts et Châteaux
5th Overall Redlands Bicycle Classic
2021
5th Time trial, National Road Championships
2023
2nd Time trial, National Road Championships
5th Overall O Gran Camiño
8th Overall Saudi Tour
2024 (1 pro win)
1st Stage 5 Volta a la Comunitat Valenciana
2026
3rd Time trial, National Road Championships

=== Grand Tour general classification results timeline ===
Grand Tour	2019	2020	2021	2022	2023	2024
Giro d'Italia	—	—	—	59	52	50
Tour de France	—	—	—	—	—	102
Vuelta a España	131	22	—	—	—	

Legend
—	Did not compete
DNF	Did not finish
