= 2024 Giro d'Italia =

Cycling competition

2024 UCI World Tour, race 22 of 35
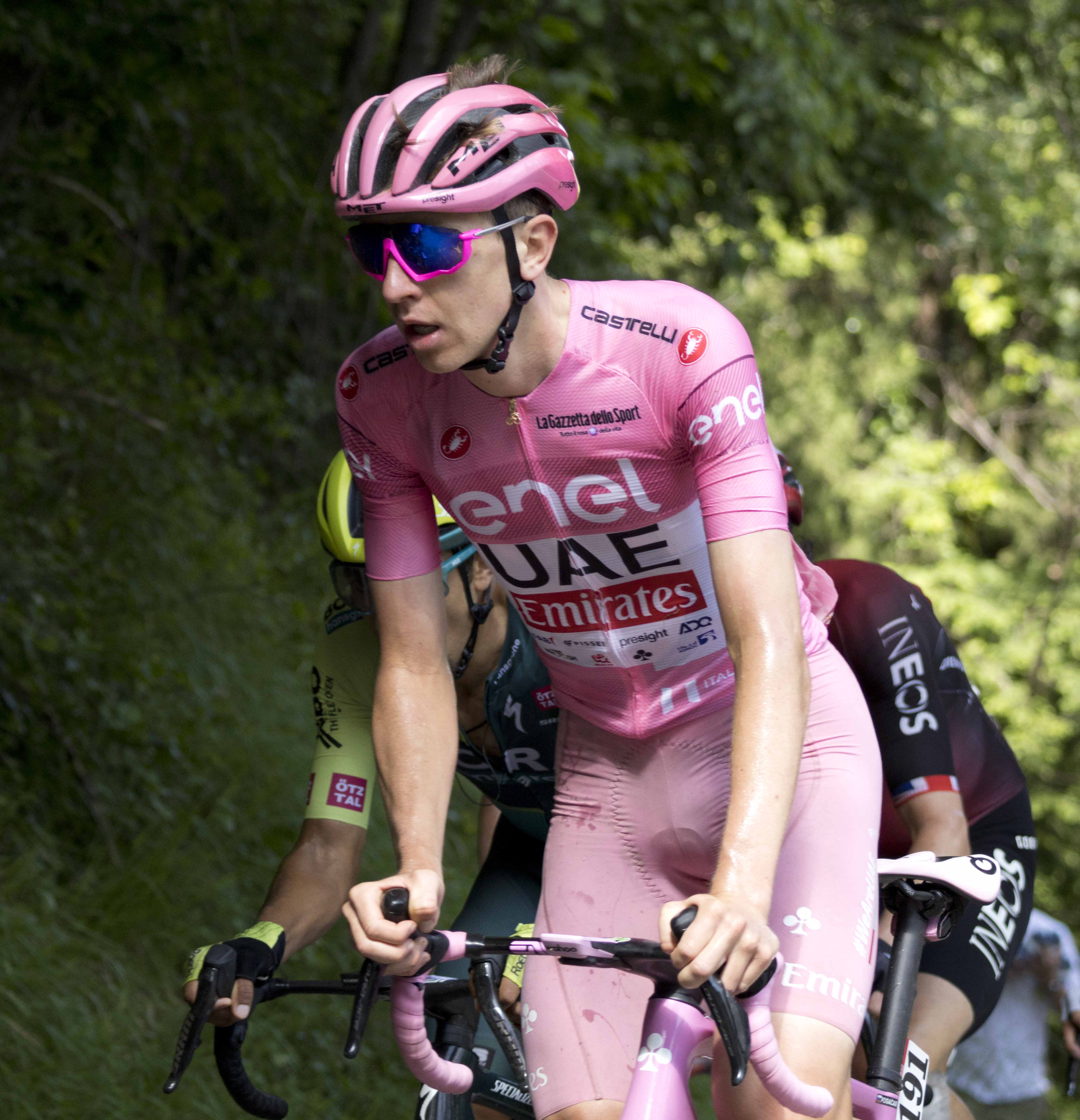
- Tadej Pogačar, the winner of 2024 Giro d'Italia

Race details
- Dates: 4–26 May 2024
- Stages: 21
- Distance: 3,317.5 km (2,061.4 mi)
- Winning time: 79h 14' 03"

Results
Jersey awarded to the overall winner	Winner	Tadej Pogačar (SLO)	(UAE Team Emirates)
	Second	Daniel Martínez (COL)	(Bora–Hansgrohe)
	Third	Geraint Thomas (GBR)	(INEOS Grenadiers)
Jersey awarded to the points classification winner	Points	Jonathan Milan (ITA)	(Lidl–Trek)
Jersey awarded to the mountains classification winner	Mountains	Tadej Pogačar (SLO)	(UAE Team Emirates)
Jersey awarded to the young rider classification winner	Young rider	Antonio Tiberi (ITA)	(Team Bahrain Victorious)
	Sprints	Andrea Pietrobon (ITA)	(Polti–Kometa)
Jersey awarded to the combativity classification winner	Combativity	Julian Alaphilippe (FRA)	(Soudal–Quick-Step)
Jersey awarded to the intergiro classification winner	Intergiro	Filippo Fiorelli (ITA)	(VF Group–Bardiani–CSF–Faizanè)
	Team	(France) Decathlon–AG2R La Mondiale	

The 2024 Giro d'Italia was the 107th edition of the Giro d'Italia, a three-week Grand Tour cycling stage race. The race started on 4 May in Venaria Reale and finished on 26 May in Rome. There were two individual time trial stages and 4 stages longer than 200 km.

The general classification was won by Tadej Pogačar of UAE Team Emirates, by a margin of 9 minutes 56 second over his closest competitor, Daniel Martínez. Pogačar also won the mountains classification and six stages, and together with Eddy Merckx (1973) is the rider who in the post-war period has won the general classification taking the greatest number of stages. Pogačar's winning margin was the biggest since the 1965 edition and the fourth largest in the post-World War II era.

== Teams ==
UCI WorldTeams

- Alpecin–Deceuninck
- Arkéa–B&B Hotels
- Astana Qazaqstan Team
- Bora–Hansgrohe
- Cofidis
- Decathlon–AG2R La Mondiale
- EF Education–EasyPost
- Groupama–FDJ
- INEOS Grenadiers
- Intermarché–Wanty
- Lidl–Trek
- Movistar Team
- Soudal–Quick-Step
- Team Bahrain Victorious
- Team dsm–firmenich PostNL
- Team Jayco–AlUla
- UAE Team Emirates
- Visma–Lease a Bike

UCI ProTeams

- Israel–Premier Tech
- Polti–Kometa
- Tudor Pro Cycling Team
- VF Group–Bardiani–CSF–Faizanè

== Pre-race favourites ==
Tadej Pogačar was the pre-race favorite after announcing he will race the Giro; 2023 runner-up Geraint Thomas also returned. Both riders had expressed the intention to attempt a Giro-Tour double.

== Route and stages ==
Stage characteristics and winners
Stage	Date	Course	Distance	Elevation gain	Type	Winner
1	4 May	Venaria Reale to Turin	140 km (87 mi)	1,850 m (6,070 ft)	Hilly stage	Jhonatan Narváez (ECU)
2	5 May	San Francesco al Campo to Santuario di Oropa (Biella)	161 km (100 mi)	2,300 m (7,500 ft)	Intermediate stage	Tadej Pogačar (SLO)
3	6 May	Novara to Fossano	166 km (103 mi)	750 m (2,460 ft)	Flat stage	Tim Merlier (BEL)
4	7 May	Acqui Terme to Andora	190 km (120 mi)	1,700 m (5,600 ft)	Flat stage	Jonathan Milan (ITA)
5	8 May	Genoa to Lucca	178 km (111 mi)	1,700 m (5,600 ft)	Hilly stage	Benjamin Thomas (FRA)
6	9 May	Viareggio to Rapolano Terme	180 km (110 mi)	1,900 m (6,200 ft)	Hilly stage	Pelayo Sánchez (ESP)
7	10 May	Foligno to Perugia	40.6 km (25.2 mi)	400 m (1,300 ft)	Individual time trial	Tadej Pogačar (SLO)
8	11 May	Spoleto to Prati di Tivo	152 km (94 mi)	3,850 m (12,630 ft)	Mountain stage	Tadej Pogačar (SLO)
9	12 May	Avezzano to Naples	214 km (133 mi)	1,300 m (4,300 ft)	Hilly stage	Olav Kooij (NED)
	13 May				Rest day	
10	14 May	Pompei to Cusano Mutri	142 km (88 mi)	2,850 m (9,350 ft)	Intermediate stage	Valentin Paret-Peintre (FRA)
11	15 May	Foiano di Val Fortore to Francavilla al Mare	207 km (129 mi)	1,850 m (6,070 ft)	Flat stage	Jonathan Milan (ITA)
12	16 May	Martinsicuro to Fano	193 km (120 mi)	2,100 m (6,900 ft)	Hilly stage	Julian Alaphilippe (FRA)
13	17 May	Riccione to Cento	179 km (111 mi)	150 m (490 ft)	Flat stage	Jonathan Milan (ITA)
14	18 May	Castiglione delle Stiviere to Desenzano del Garda	31.2 km (19.4 mi)	150 m (490 ft)	Individual time trial	Filippo Ganna (ITA)
15	19 May	Manerba del Garda to Livigno	222 km (138 mi)	5,400 m (17,700 ft)	Mountain stage	Tadej Pogačar (SLO)
	20 May				Rest day	
16	21 May	~~Livigno~~ Laas to Santa Cristina Valgardena (Note: Distance originally was 202 km, then it was rerouted to 206 km. Before the start of the stage, the distance was shortened to 118.7 km due to bad weather conditions.)	118.7 km (73.8 mi)	4,350 m (14,270 ft)	Mountain stage	Tadej Pogačar (SLO)
17	22 May	Selva di Val Gardena to Passo del Brocon	159 km (99 mi)	4,200 m (13,800 ft)	Mountain stage	Georg Steinhauser (GER)
18	23 May	Fiera di Primiero to Padua	178 km (111 mi)	550 m (1,800 ft)	Flat stage	Tim Merlier (BEL)
19	24 May	Mortegliano to Sappada	157 km (98 mi)	2,850 m (9,350 ft)	Intermediate stage	Andrea Vendrame (ITA)
20	25 May	Alpago to Bassano del Grappa	184 km (114 mi)	4,200 m (13,800 ft)	Mountain stage	Tadej Pogačar (SLO)
21	26 May	Rome to Rome	125 km (78 mi)	300 m (980 ft)	Flat stage	Tim Merlier (BEL)
Total			3,317.5 km (2,061.4 mi)	44,650 m (146,490 ft)		

== Classification leadership ==
Classification leadership by stage
Stage	Winner	General classification	Points classification	Mountains classification	Young rider classification	General Super Team	Intermediate sprint classification	Intergiro classification	Combativity award	Breakaway classification
1	Jhonatan Narváez	Jhonatan Narváez	Jhonatan Narváez (Note: On stage 2, Filippo Fiorelli, who was third in the points classification, wore the purple jersey, because first placed Jhonatan Narváez wore the pink jersey as the leader of the general classification, and second placed Lilian Calmejane wore the blue jersey as leader of the mountains classification.)	Lilian Calmejane	Alex Baudin	INEOS Grenadiers	Damiano Caruso	Lilian Calmejane	Amanuel Ghebreigzabhier	Lilian Calmejane
2	Tadej Pogačar	Tadej Pogačar	Filippo Fiorelli	Tadej Pogačar (Note: On stages 3, 4, 9 and 10, Daniel Martínez, who was second in the mountains classification, wore the blue jersey, because first placed Tadej Pogačar wore the pink jersey as the leader of the general classification. On stages 5–8, Lilian Calmejane wore the blue jersey for the same reason. On stages 11–16, Simon Geschke wore the blue jersey for the same reason. On stage 17, Christian Scaroni wore the blue jersey for the same reason. On stages 18, 19 and 21, Giulio Pellizzari wore the blue jersey for the same reason. On stage 20, Georg Steinhauser wore the blue jersey for the same reason.)	Cian Uijtdebroeks	Bora–Hansgrohe	Andrea Piccolo	Filippo Fiorelli	Andrea Piccolo	Filippo Fiorelli
3	Tim Merlier	Tadej Pogačar	Tim Merlier	Tadej Pogačar	Cian Uijtdebroeks	Bora–Hansgrohe	Filippo Fiorelli	Filippo Fiorelli	Filippo Fiorelli	Filippo Fiorelli
4	Jonathan Milan	Tadej Pogačar	Jonathan Milan	Tadej Pogačar	Cian Uijtdebroeks	INEOS Grenadiers	Filippo Fiorelli	Lilian Calmejane	Francisco Muñoz	Lilian Calmejane
5	Benjamin Thomas	Tadej Pogačar	Jonathan Milan	Tadej Pogačar	Cian Uijtdebroeks	INEOS Grenadiers	Filippo Fiorelli	Lilian Calmejane	Mattia Bais	Lilian Calmejane
6	Pelayo Sánchez	Tadej Pogačar	Jonathan Milan	Tadej Pogačar	Cian Uijtdebroeks	INEOS Grenadiers	Filippo Fiorelli	Filippo Fiorelli	Julian Alaphilippe	Lilian Calmejane
7	Tadej Pogačar	Tadej Pogačar	Jonathan Milan	Tadej Pogačar	Luke Plapp	INEOS Grenadiers	Filippo Fiorelli	Filippo Fiorelli	not awarded	Lilian Calmejane
8	Tadej Pogačar	Tadej Pogačar	Jonathan Milan	Tadej Pogačar	Cian Uijtdebroeks	Decathlon–AG2R La Mondiale	Filippo Fiorelli	Filippo Fiorelli	Romain Bardet	Lilian Calmejane
9	Olav Kooij	Tadej Pogačar	Jonathan Milan	Tadej Pogačar	Cian Uijtdebroeks	Decathlon–AG2R La Mondiale	Filippo Fiorelli	Kaden Groves	Mirco Maestri	Andrea Pietrobon
10	Valentin Paret-Peintre	Tadej Pogačar	Jonathan Milan	Tadej Pogačar	Cian Uijtdebroeks	Decathlon–AG2R La Mondiale	Filippo Fiorelli	Filippo Fiorelli	Jan Tratnik	Andrea Pietrobon
11	Jonathan Milan	Tadej Pogačar	Jonathan Milan	Tadej Pogačar	Antonio Tiberi	Decathlon–AG2R La Mondiale	Filippo Fiorelli	Filippo Fiorelli	Edoardo Affini	Andrea Pietrobon
12	Julian Alaphilippe	Tadej Pogačar	Jonathan Milan	Tadej Pogačar	Antonio Tiberi	Decathlon–AG2R La Mondiale	Julian Alaphilippe	Filippo Fiorelli	Julian Alaphilippe	Andrea Pietrobon
13	Jonathan Milan	Tadej Pogačar	Jonathan Milan	Tadej Pogačar	Antonio Tiberi	Decathlon–AG2R La Mondiale	Andrea Pietrobon	Filippo Fiorelli	Andrea Pietrobon	Andrea Pietrobon
14	Filippo Ganna	Tadej Pogačar	Jonathan Milan	Tadej Pogačar	Antonio Tiberi	INEOS Grenadiers	Andrea Pietrobon	Filippo Fiorelli	not awarded	Andrea Pietrobon
15	Tadej Pogačar	Tadej Pogačar	Jonathan Milan	Tadej Pogačar	Antonio Tiberi	INEOS Grenadiers	Andrea Pietrobon	Filippo Fiorelli	Nairo Quintana	Andrea Pietrobon
16	Tadej Pogačar	Tadej Pogačar	Jonathan Milan	Tadej Pogačar	Antonio Tiberi	Decathlon–AG2R La Mondiale	Andrea Pietrobon	Filippo Fiorelli	Julian Alaphilippe	Andrea Pietrobon
17	Georg Steinhauser	Tadej Pogačar	Jonathan Milan	Tadej Pogačar	Antonio Tiberi	Decathlon–AG2R La Mondiale	Andrea Pietrobon	Filippo Fiorelli	Nairo Quintana	Andrea Pietrobon
18	Tim Merlier	Tadej Pogačar	Jonathan Milan	Tadej Pogačar	Antonio Tiberi	Decathlon–AG2R La Mondiale	Andrea Pietrobon	Filippo Fiorelli	Mirco Maestri	Andrea Pietrobon
19	Andrea Vendrame	Tadej Pogačar	Jonathan Milan	Tadej Pogačar	Antonio Tiberi	Decathlon–AG2R La Mondiale	Julian Alaphilippe	Filippo Fiorelli	Julian Alaphilippe	Andrea Pietrobon
20	Tadej Pogačar	Tadej Pogačar	Jonathan Milan	Tadej Pogačar	Antonio Tiberi	Decathlon–AG2R La Mondiale	Andrea Pietrobon	Filippo Fiorelli	Giulio Pellizzari	Andrea Pietrobon
21	Tim Merlier	Tadej Pogačar	Jonathan Milan	Tadej Pogačar	Antonio Tiberi	Decathlon–AG2R La Mondiale	Andrea Pietrobon	Filippo Fiorelli	Ewen Costiou	Andrea Pietrobon
Final		Tadej Pogačar	Jonathan Milan	Tadej Pogačar	Antonio Tiberi	Decathlon–AG2R La Mondiale	Andrea Pietrobon	Filippo Fiorelli	Julian Alaphilippe	Andrea Pietrobon

== Classification standings ==
Legend
Denotes the leader of the general classification	Denotes the leader of the mountains classification
Denotes the leader of the points classification	Denotes the leader of the young rider classification
Denotes the winner of the combativity award	Denotes the leader of the intergiro classification

=== General classification ===
Final general classification (1–10)
Rank	Rider	Team	Time
1	Tadej Pogačar (SLO)	UAE Team Emirates	79h 14' 03"
2	Daniel Martínez (COL)	Bora–Hansgrohe	+ 9' 56"
3	Geraint Thomas (GBR)	INEOS Grenadiers	+ 10' 24"
4	Ben O'Connor (AUS)	Decathlon–AG2R La Mondiale	+ 12' 07"
5	Antonio Tiberi (ITA)	Team Bahrain Victorious	+ 12' 49"
6	Thymen Arensman (NED)	INEOS Grenadiers	+ 14' 31"
7	Einer Rubio (COL)	Movistar Team	+ 15' 52"
8	Jan Hirt (CZE)	Soudal–Quick-Step	+ 18' 05"
9	Romain Bardet (FRA)	Team dsm–firmenich PostNL	+ 20' 32"
10	Michael Storer (AUS)	Tudor Pro Cycling Team	+ 21' 11"

Final general classification (11–142)
Rank	Rider	Team	Time
11	Filippo Zana (ITA)	Team Jayco–AlUla	+ 23' 59"
12	Lorenzo Fortunato (ITA)	Astana Qazaqstan Team	+ 26' 44"
13	Davide Piganzoli (ITA)	Polti–Kometa	+ 32' 23"
14	Simon Geschke (GER)	Cofidis	+ 33' 55"
15	Rafał Majka (POL)	UAE Team Emirates	+ 37' 05"
16	Valentin Paret-Peintre (FRA)	Decathlon–AG2R La Mondiale	+ 43' 26"
17	Damiano Caruso (ITA)	Team Bahrain Victorious	+ 48' 16"
18	Luca Covili (ITA)	VF Group–Bardiani–CSF–Faizanè	+ 51' 08"
19	Nairo Quintana (COL)	Movistar Team	+ 54' 37"
20	Domenico Pozzovivo (ITA)	VF Group–Bardiani–CSF–Faizanè	+ 56' 32"
21	Alex Baudin (FRA)	Decathlon–AG2R La Mondiale	+ 1h 00' 47"
22	Attila Valter (HUN)	Visma–Lease a Bike	+ 1h 04' 46"
23	Nicola Conci (ITA)	Alpecin–Deceuninck	+ 1h 09' 10"
24	Giovanni Aleotti (ITA)	Bora–Hansgrohe	+ 1h 13' 03"
25	Michel Ries (LUX)	Arkéa–B&B Hotels	+ 1h 20' 06"
26	Aurélien Paret-Peintre (FRA)	Decathlon–AG2R La Mondiale	+ 1h 22' 55"
27	Edoardo Zambanini (ITA)	Team Bahrain Victorious	+ 1h 25' 56"
28	Jhonatan Narváez (ECU)	INEOS Grenadiers	+ 1h 33' 13"
29	Kevin Vermaerke (USA)	Team dsm–firmenich PostNL	+ 1h 33' 41"
30	Mauri Vansevenant (BEL)	Soudal–Quick-Step	+ 1h 47' 43"
31	Felix Großschartner (AUT)	UAE Team Emirates	+ 1h 56' 06"
32	Simone Velasco (ITA)	Astana Qazaqstan Team	+ 2h 00' 00"
33	Georg Steinhauser (GER)	EF Education–EasyPost	+ 2h 01' 11"
34	Jan Tratnik (SLO)	Visma–Lease a Bike	+ 2h 04' 15"
35	Esteban Chaves (COL)	EF Education–EasyPost	+ 2h 04' 22"
36	Chris Hamilton (AUS)	Team dsm–firmenich PostNL	+ 2h 07' 50"
37	Larry Warbasse (USA)	Decathlon–AG2R La Mondiale	+ 2h 12' 16"
38	Michael Valgren (DEN)	EF Education–EasyPost	+ 2h 12' 33"
39	Juan Pedro López (ESP)	Lidl–Trek	+ 2h 13' 11"
40	Pelayo Sánchez (ESP)	Movistar Team	+ 2h 14' 44"
41	Alessandro Tonelli (ITA)	VF Group–Bardiani–CSF–Faizanè	+ 2h 17' 48"
42	Lilian Calmejane (FRA)	Intermarché–Wanty	+ 2h 23' 01"
43	Gijs Leemreize (NED)	Team dsm–firmenich PostNL	+ 2h 24' 58"
44	Marco Frigo (ITA)	Israel–Premier Tech	+ 2h 28' 33"
45	Maximilian Schachmann (GER)	Bora–Hansgrohe	+ 2h 29' 54"
46	Andrea Vendrame (ITA)	Decathlon–AG2R La Mondiale	+ 2h 30' 54"
47	Henok Mulubrhan (ERI)	Astana Qazaqstan Team	+ 2h 33' 34"
48	Julian Alaphilippe (FRA)	Soudal–Quick-Step	+ 2h 35' 58"
49	Giulio Pellizzari (ITA)	VF Group–Bardiani–CSF–Faizanè	+ 2h 42' 10"
50	Will Barta (USA)	Movistar Team	+ 2h 44' 15"
51	Alessandro De Marchi (ITA)	Team Jayco–AlUla	+ 2h 47' 06"
52	Luke Plapp (AUS)	Team Jayco–AlUla	+ 2h 52' 59"
53	Quinten Hermans (BEL)	Alpecin–Deceuninck	+ 2h 53' 06"
54	Rubén Fernández (ESP)	Cofidis	+ 2h 53' 11"
55	Thomas Champion (FRA)	Cofidis	+ 2h 57' 59"
56	Enzo Paleni (FRA)	Groupama–FDJ	+ 3h 00' 47"
57	Jasha Sütterlin (GER)	Team Bahrain Victorious	+ 3h 04' 32"
58	Ben Swift (GBR)	INEOS Grenadiers	+ 3h 04' 46"
59	Magnus Sheffield (USA)	INEOS Grenadiers	+ 3h 06' 10"
60	Mirco Maestri (ITA)	Polti–Kometa	+ 3h 11' 01"
61	Mattia Bais (ITA)	Polti–Kometa	+ 3h 12' 08"
62	Mikkel Frølich Honoré (DEN)	EF Education–EasyPost	+ 3h 18' 52"
63	Amanuel Ghebreigzabhier (ERI)	Lidl–Trek	+ 3h 20' 43"
64	Rainer Kepplinger (AUT)	Team Bahrain Victorious	+ 3h 23' 14"
65	Andrea Bagioli (ITA)	Lidl–Trek	+ 3h 34' 13"
66	Harrison Wood (GBR)	Cofidis	+ 3h 34' 36"
67	Domen Novak (SLO)	UAE Team Emirates	+ 3h 36' 45"
68	Albert Torres (ESP)	Movistar Team	+ 3h 38' 37"
69	Damien Touzé (FRA)	Decathlon–AG2R La Mondiale	+ 3h 46' 43"
70	Davide Ballerini (ITA)	Astana Qazaqstan Team	+ 3h 48' 00"
71	Jefferson Alexander Cepeda (ECU)	EF Education–EasyPost	+ 3h 51' 59"
72	Cyril Barthe (FRA)	Groupama–FDJ	+ 3h 54' 13"
73	Alessandro Verre (ITA)	Arkéa–B&B Hotels	+ 3h 54' 23"
74	Florian Stork (GER)	Tudor Pro Cycling Team	+ 3h 54' 30"
75	Vegard Stake Laengen (NOR)	UAE Team Emirates	+ 3h 56' 58"
76	Davide Bais (ITA)	Polti–Kometa	+ 3h 58' 26"
77	Filippo Fiorelli (ITA)	VF Group–Bardiani–CSF–Faizanè	+ 4h 00' 18"
78	Pieter Serry (BEL)	Soudal–Quick-Step	+ 4h 00' 53"
79	Tobias Foss (NOR)	INEOS Grenadiers	+ 4h 01' 40"
80	Stefan De Bod (RSA)	EF Education–EasyPost	+ 4h 04' 01"
81	Andrea Pasqualon (ITA)	Team Bahrain Victorious	+ 4h 07' 30"
82	Matteo Trentin (ITA)	Tudor Pro Cycling Team	+ 4h 07' 41"
83	Connor Swift (GBR)	INEOS Grenadiers	+ 4h 08' 46"
84	Jimmy Janssens (BEL)	Alpecin–Deceuninck	+ 4h 13' 19"
85	Lorenzo Milesi (ITA)	Movistar Team	+ 4h 13' 21"
86	Patrick Gamper (AUT)	Bora–Hansgrohe	+ 4h 14' 45"
87	Lorenzo Germani (ITA)	Groupama–FDJ	+ 4h 16' 21"
88	Bastien Tronchon (FRA)	Decathlon–AG2R La Mondiale	+ 4h 16' 47"
89	Dion Smith (NZL)	Intermarché–Wanty	+ 4h 17' 50"
90	Ewen Costiou (FRA)	Arkéa–B&B Hotels	+ 4h 18' 08"
91	Kaden Groves (AUS)	Alpecin–Deceuninck	+ 4h 18' 38"
92	Jasper Stuyven (BEL)	Lidl–Trek	+ 4h 20' 07"
93	Lewis Askey (GBR)	Groupama–FDJ	+ 4h 21' 30"
94	Matteo Fabbro (ITA)	Polti–Kometa	+ 4h 22' 04"
95	Edward Planckaert (BEL)	Alpecin–Deceuninck	+ 4h 25' 03"
96	Tobias Bayer (AUT)	Alpecin–Deceuninck	+ 4h 25' 27"
97	Simon Clarke (AUS)	Israel–Premier Tech	+ 4h 26' 00"
98	Kevin Colleoni (ITA)	Intermarché–Wanty	+ 4h 27' 05"
99	Martin Marcellusi (ITA)	VF Group–Bardiani–CSF–Faizanè	+ 4h 29' 28"
100	Jonas Koch (GER)	Bora–Hansgrohe	+ 4h 29' 56"
101	Filippo Ganna (ITA)	INEOS Grenadiers	+ 4h 34' 59"
102	Manuele Tarozzi (ITA)	VF Group–Bardiani–CSF–Faizanè	+ 4h 38' 06"
103	Laurence Pithie (NZL)	Groupama–FDJ	+ 4h 38' 23"
104	Roel van Sintmaartensdijk (NED)	Intermarché–Wanty	+ 4h 39' 29"
105	Tim van Dijke (NED)	Visma–Lease a Bike	+ 4h 43' 29"
106	Dries De Pooter (BEL)	Intermarché–Wanty	+ 4h 43' 53"
107	Fabio Van den Bossche (BEL)	Alpecin–Deceuninck	+ 4h 46' 05"
108	Mikkel Bjerg (DEN)	UAE Team Emirates	+ 4h 52' 11"
109	Andrea Pietrobon (ITA)	Polti–Kometa	+ 4h 53' 44"
110	Alexander Kamp (DEN)	Tudor Pro Cycling Team	+ 4h 54' 18"
111	Timo Kielich (BEL)	Alpecin–Deceuninck	+ 4h 56' 47"
112	Madis Mihkels (EST)	Intermarché–Wanty	+ 4h 57' 16"
113	Edward Theuns (BEL)	Lidl–Trek	+ 5h 11' 21"
114	Nicolas Debeaumarché (FRA)	Cofidis	+ 5h 11' 40"
115	Michael Hepburn (AUS)	Team Jayco–AlUla	+ 5h 11' 49"
116	Alberto Dainese (ITA)	Tudor Pro Cycling Team	+ 5h 14' 20"
117	Luke Lamperti (USA)	Soudal–Quick-Step	+ 5h 15' 06"
118	Jonathan Milan (ITA)	Lidl–Trek	+ 5h 18' 49"
119	Donavan Grondin (FRA)	Arkéa–B&B Hotels	+ 5h 19' 38"
120	Caleb Ewan (AUS)	Team Jayco–AlUla	+ 5h 20' 01"
121	Rui Oliveira (POR)	UAE Team Emirates	+ 5h 21' 05"
122	Francisco Muñoz (ESP)	Polti–Kometa	+ 5h 21' 56"
123	Simone Consonni (ITA)	Lidl–Trek	+ 5h 24' 28"
124	Enrico Zanoncello (ITA)	VF Group–Bardiani–CSF–Faizanè	+ 5h 24' 52"
125	Juan Sebastián Molano (COL)	UAE Team Emirates	+ 5h 25' 08"
126	Hugo Hofstetter (FRA)	Israel–Premier Tech	+ 5h 25' 50"
127	Max Walscheid (GER)	Team Jayco–AlUla	+ 5h 26' 34"
128	Giovanni Lonardi (ITA)	Polti–Kometa	+ 5h 29' 14"
129	Stanisław Aniołkowski (POL)	Cofidis	+ 5h 30' 35"
130	Edoardo Affini (ITA)	Visma–Lease a Bike	+ 5h 30' 59"
131	Ryan Mullen (IRL)	Bora–Hansgrohe	+ 5h 35' 48"
132	Daan Hoole (NED)	Lidl–Trek	+ 5h 37' 50"
133	Olivier Le Gac (FRA)	Groupama–FDJ	+ 5h 39' 13"
134	Davide Cimolai (ITA)	Movistar Team	+ 5h 39' 49"
135	Bert Van Lerberghe (BEL)	Soudal–Quick-Step	+ 5h 40' 20"
136	Robin Froidevaux (SUI)	Tudor Pro Cycling Team	+ 5h 41' 04"
137	Fernando Gaviria (COL)	Movistar Team	+ 5h 42' 54"
138	Tim Merlier (BEL)	Soudal–Quick-Step	+ 5h 46' 04"
139	Fabian Lienhard (SUI)	Groupama–FDJ	+ 5h 46' 08"
140	Tobias Lund Andresen (DEN)	Team dsm–firmenich PostNL	+ 5h 49' 25"
141	Josef Černý (CZE)	Soudal–Quick-Step	+ 5h 55' 35"
142	Alan Riou (FRA)	Arkéa–B&B Hotels	+ 6h 02' 28"

=== Points classification ===
Final points classification (1–10)
Rank	Rider	Team	Points
1	Jonathan Milan (ITA)	Lidl–Trek	352
2	Kaden Groves (AUS)	Alpecin–Deceuninck	225
3	Tim Merlier (BEL)	Soudal–Quick-Step	193
4	Julian Alaphilippe (FRA)	Soudal–Quick-Step	132
5	Tadej Pogačar (SLO)	UAE Team Emirates	126
6	Andrea Pietrobon (ITA)	Polti–Kometa	117
7	Filippo Fiorelli (ITA)	VF Group–Bardiani–CSF–Faizanè	116
8	Davide Ballerini (ITA)	Astana Qazaqstan Team	84
9	Jhonatan Narváez (ECU)	INEOS Grenadiers	80
10	Stanislaw Aniolkowski (POL)	Cofidis	78

=== Mountains classification ===
Final mountains classification (1–10)
Rank	Rider	Team	Points
1	Tadej Pogačar (SLO)	UAE Team Emirates	270
2	Giulio Pellizzari (ITA)	VF Group–Bardiani–CSF–Faizanè	206
3	Georg Steinhauser (GER)	EF Education–EasyPost	153
4	Nairo Quintana (COL)	Movistar Team	114
5	Julian Alaphilippe (FRA)	Soudal–Quick-Step	101
6	Daniel Martínez (COL)	Bora–Hansgrohe	81
7	Simon Geschke (GER)	Cofidis	78
8	Valentin Paret-Peintre (FRA)	Decathlon–AG2R La Mondiale	59
9	Romain Bardet (FRA)	Team dsm–firmenich PostNL	47
10	Amanuel Ghebreigzabhier (ERI)	Lidl–Trek	42

=== Young rider classification ===
Final young rider classification (1–10)
Rank	Rider	Team	Time
1	Antonio Tiberi (ITA)	Team Bahrain Victorious	79h 26' 52"
2	Thymen Arensman (NED)	INEOS Grenadiers	+ 1' 42"
3	Filippo Zana (ITA)	Team Jayco–AlUla	+ 11' 10"
4	Davide Piganzoli (ITA)	Polti–Kometa	+ 19' 34"
5	Valentin Paret-Peintre (FRA)	Decathlon–AG2R La Mondiale	+ 30' 37"
6	Alex Baudin (FRA)	Decathlon–AG2R La Mondiale	+ 47' 58"
7	Giovanni Aleotti (ITA)	Bora–Hansgrohe	+ 1h 00' 14"
8	Edoardo Zambanini (ITA)	Team Bahrain Victorious	+ 1h 13' 07"
9	Kevin Vermaerke (USA)	Team dsm–firmenich PostNL	+ 1h 20' 52"
10	Mauri Vansevenant (BEL)	Soudal–Quick-Step	+ 1h 34' 54"

=== Team classification ===
Final team classification (1–10)
Rank	Team	Time
1	(France) Decathlon–AG2R La Mondiale	238h 30' 07"
2	(United Kingdom) INEOS Grenadiers	+ 44' 23"
3	(United Arab Emirates) UAE Team Emirates	+ 1h 01' 50"
4	Team Bahrain Victorious	+ 1h 20' 25"
5	(Spain) Movistar Team	+ 1h 51' 00"
6	(Kazakhstan) Astana Qazaqstan Team	+ 1h 58' 31"
7	(Italy) VF Group–Bardiani–CSF–Faizanè	+ 2h 16' 59"
8	(Netherlands) Team dsm–firmenich PostNL	+ 2h 18' 50"
9	(Germany) Bora–Hansgrohe	+ 2h 45' 37"
10	(Belgium) Soudal–Quick-Step	+ 2h 59' 42"

=== Intermediate sprint classification ===
Final intermediate sprint classification (1–10)
Rank	Rider	Team	Points
1	Andrea Pietrobon (ITA)	Polti–Kometa	70
2	Julian Alaphilippe (FRA)	Soudal–Quick-Step	67
3	Mirco Maestri (ITA)	Polti–Kometa	43
4	Davide Ballerini (ITA)	Astana Qazaqstan Team	43
5	Filippo Fiorelli (ITA)	VF Group–Bardiani–CSF–Faizanè	43
6	Kaden Groves (AUS)	Alpecin–Deceuninck	26
7	Martin Marcellusi (ITA)	VF Group–Bardiani–CSF–Faizanè	26
8	Jonathan Milan (ITA)	Lidl–Trek	20
9	Mikkel Honoré (DEN)	EF Education–EasyPost	19
10	Tadej Pogačar (SLO)	UAE Team Emirates	18

=== Intergiro classification ===
Final intergiro classification (1–10)
Rank	Rider	Team	Points
1	Filippo Fiorelli (ITA)	VF Group–Bardiani–CSF–Faizanè	59
2	Julian Alaphilippe (FRA)	Soudal–Quick-Step	48
3	Andrea Pietrobon (ITA)	Polti–Kometa	44
4	Kaden Groves (AUS)	Alpecin–Deceuninck	37
5	Mirco Maestri (ITA)	Polti–Kometa	34
6	Georg Steinhauser (GER)	EF Education–EasyPost	25
7	Manuele Tarozzi (ITA)	VF Group–Bardiani–CSF–Faizanè	24
8	Pelayo Sánchez (ESP)	Movistar Team	22
9	Jonathan Milan (ITA)	Lidl–Trek	21
10	Alessandro Tonelli (ITA)	VF Group–Bardiani–CSF–Faizanè	20

=== Breakaway classification ===
Final breakaway classification (1–10)
Rank	Rider	Team	Kilometers
1	Andrea Pietrobon (ITA)	Polti–Kometa	605
2	Mirco Maestri (ITA)	Polti–Kometa	523
3	Julian Alaphilippe (FRA)	Soudal–Quick-Step	490
4	Filippo Fiorelli (ITA)	VF Group–Bardiani–CSF–Faizanè	368
5	Edoardo Affini (ITA)	Visma–Lease a Bike	254
6	Lilian Calmejane (FRA)	Intermarché–Wanty	249
7	Alessandro Tonelli (ITA)	VF Group–Bardiani–CSF–Faizanè	243
8	Davide Ballerini (ITA)	Astana Qazaqstan Team	242
9	Giulio Pellizzari (ITA)	VF Group–Bardiani–CSF–Faizanè	236
10	Amanuel Ghebreigzabhier (ERI)	Lidl–Trek	219

== Notes ==
Preceded by 2023 Vuelta a España	Grand Tour	Succeeded by 2024 Tour de France
