= Pelayo Sánchez =

Spanish cyclist (born 2000)

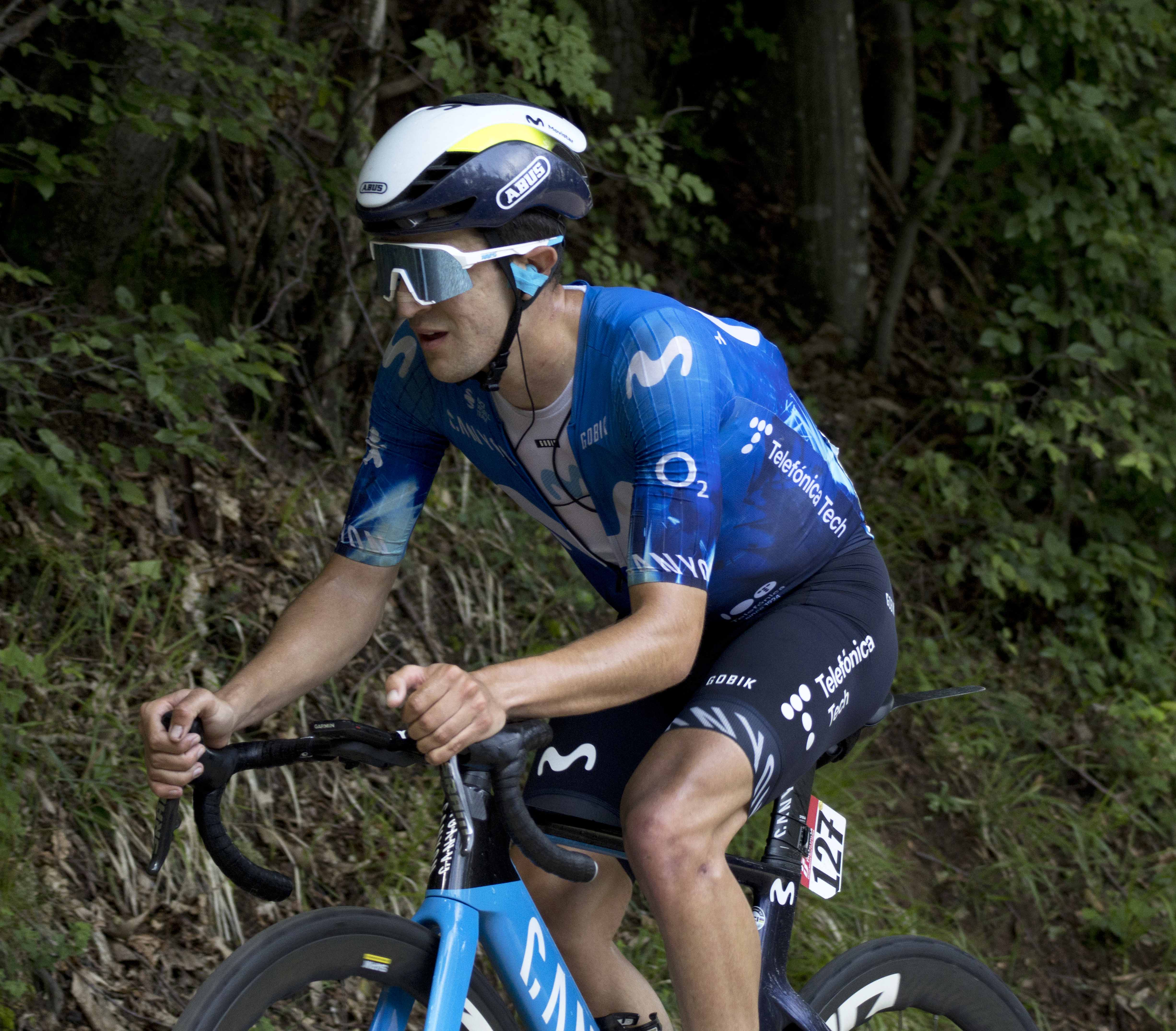
- Sánchez at 2024 Giro d'Italia

Personal information
- Full name: Pelayo Sánchez Mayo
- Born: 27 March 2000 (age 26) Teyego, Spain
- Height: 1.76 m (5 ft 9 in)
- Weight: 61 kg (134 lb)

Cycling career
- Sport: Cycling
- Current team: Movistar Team
- Discipline: Road
- Role: Rider

Amateur teams
- 2018: MMR Academy
- 2019–2020: Gomur–Cantabria Infinita

Professional teams
- 2021–2023: Burgos BH
- 2024–: Movistar Team

Major wins
- Grand Tours Giro d'Italia 1 individual stage (2024)

Pelayo Sánchez Mayo (born 27 March 2000) is a Spanish cyclist, who currently rides for UCI WorldTeam Movistar Team.

He turned professional in 2021 with Burgos BH, where he was named to their squad for the 2021 Vuelta a España. In 2024, he joined Movistar Team on a two-year contract, winning his first race with the team at the Trofeo Pollença–Port d'Andratx in late January. In May, he won stage six of the Giro d'Italia from a three-rider breakaway.

== Major results ==
2018
3rd Time trial, National Junior Road Championships
2020
2nd Overall Vuelta a Cantabria

1st Stage 3

2022
7th Overall Volta ao Alentejo

1st Young rider classification

2023 (1 pro win)
1st Stage 3 Vuelta a Asturias
2nd Trofeo Andratx–Mirador D'es Colomer
3rd Overall GP Beiras e Serra da Estrela

1st Stage 1 (TTT)

5th Tour du Doubs
Combativity award Stage 20 Vuelta a España
2024 (2)
1st Trofeo Pollença–Port d'Andratx
1st Stage 6 Giro d'Italia
10th Figueira Champions Classic

=== Grand Tour general classification results timeline ===
| Grand Tour | 2021 | 2022 | 2023 | 2024 |
|---|---|---|---|---|
| Giro d'Italia | — | — | — | 40 |
| Tour de France | — | — | — | — |
| Vuelta a España | 84 | — | 37 | DNF |

Legend
| — | Did not compete |
| DNF | Did not finish |
